= List of diplomatic missions of Italy =

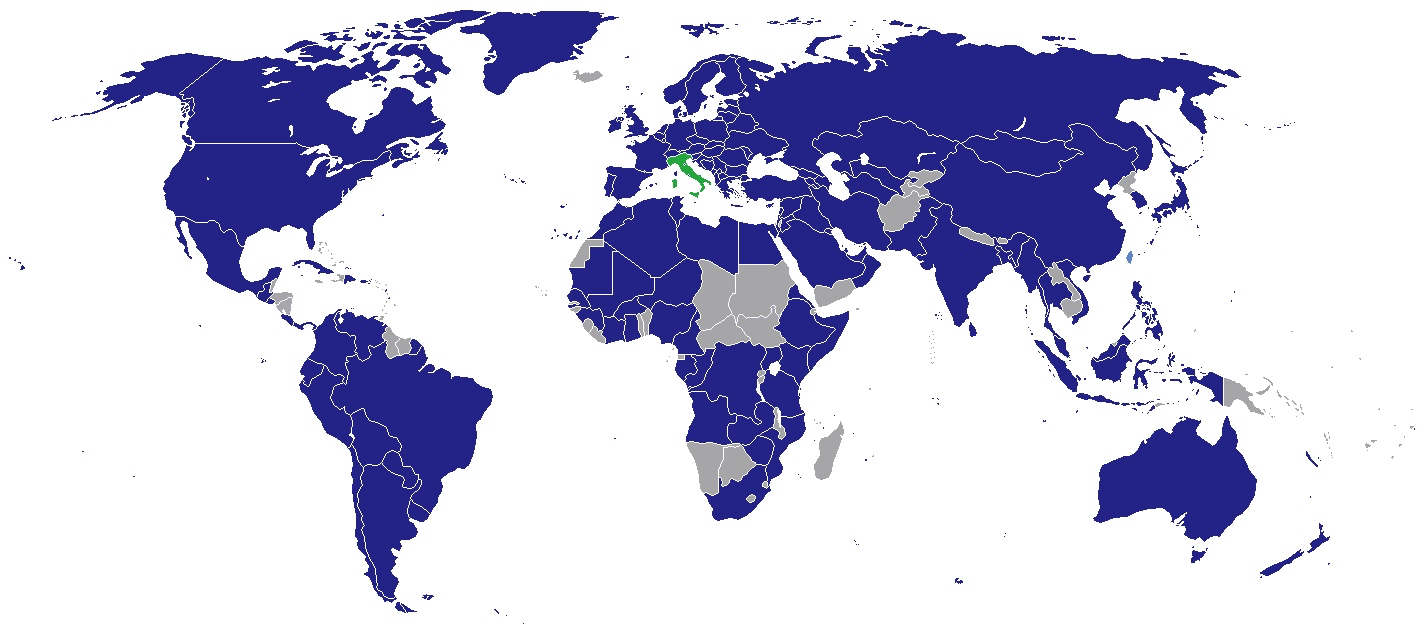
Diplomatic missions of Italy

This is a list of diplomatic missions of Italy, excluding honorary consulates. Italy has a large global network of diplomatic missions. It is the only country in the world to host its own embassy on its own territory—the Italian embassy to the Holy See is in Rome.

== Current missions ==
=== Africa ===
Host country	Host city	Mission	Concurrent accreditation	Ref.
Algeria	Algiers	Embassy		
Angola	Luanda	Embassy	Countries: São Tomé and Príncipe	
Burkina Faso	Ouagadougou	Embassy		
Cameroon	Yaoundé	Embassy	Countries: Central African Republic; Chad; Equatorial Guinea	
Congo-Brazzaville	Brazzaville	Embassy		
Congo-Kinshasa	Kinshasa	Embassy		
Egypt	Cairo	Embassy		
Eritrea	Asmara	Embassy		
Ethiopia	Addis Ababa	Embassy	Countries: Djibouti; South Sudan; International Organizations: Intergovernmental Authority on Development	
Gabon	Libreville	Embassy		
Ghana	Accra	Embassy	Countries: Togo	
Guinea	Conakry	Embassy		
Ivory Coast	Abidjan	Embassy	Countries: Liberia; Sierra Leone	
Kenya	Nairobi	Embassy	Countries: Seychelles; International Organizations: United Nations; United Nations Environment Programme; United Nations Human Settlements Programme	
Libya	Tripoli	Embassy		
Libya	Benghazi	Consulate-General		
Mali	Bamako	Embassy		
Mauritania	Nouakchott	Embassy		
Morocco	Rabat	Embassy	Countries: Consular jurisdiction only: Mauritania	
Morocco	Casablanca	Consulate-General	Countries: Consular jurisdiction only: Mauritania	
Mozambique	Maputo	Embassy	Countries: Botswana; Eswatini	
Niger	Niamey	Embassy		
Nigeria	Abuja	Embassy	Countries: Benin; International Organizations: Economic Community of West African States	
Nigeria	Lagos	Consulate-General	Countries: Benin; International Organizations: Economic Community of West African States	
Senegal	Dakar	Embassy	Countries: Cape Verde; Gambia; Guinea-Bissau; Consular jurisdiction only: Mali	
Somalia	Mogadishu	Embassy		
South Africa	Pretoria	Embassy	Countries: Lesotho; Madagascar; Mauritius; Namibia	
South Africa	Johannesburg	Consulate-General	Countries: Lesotho; Madagascar; Mauritius; Namibia	
South Africa	Cape Town	Consulate	Countries: Lesotho; Madagascar; Mauritius; Namibia	
Tanzania	Dar es Salaam	Embassy	Countries: Comoros	
Tunisia	Tunis	Embassy		
Uganda	Kampala	Embassy	Countries: Burundi; Rwanda	
Zambia	Lusaka	Embassy	Countries: Malawi	
Zimbabwe	Harare	Embassy		

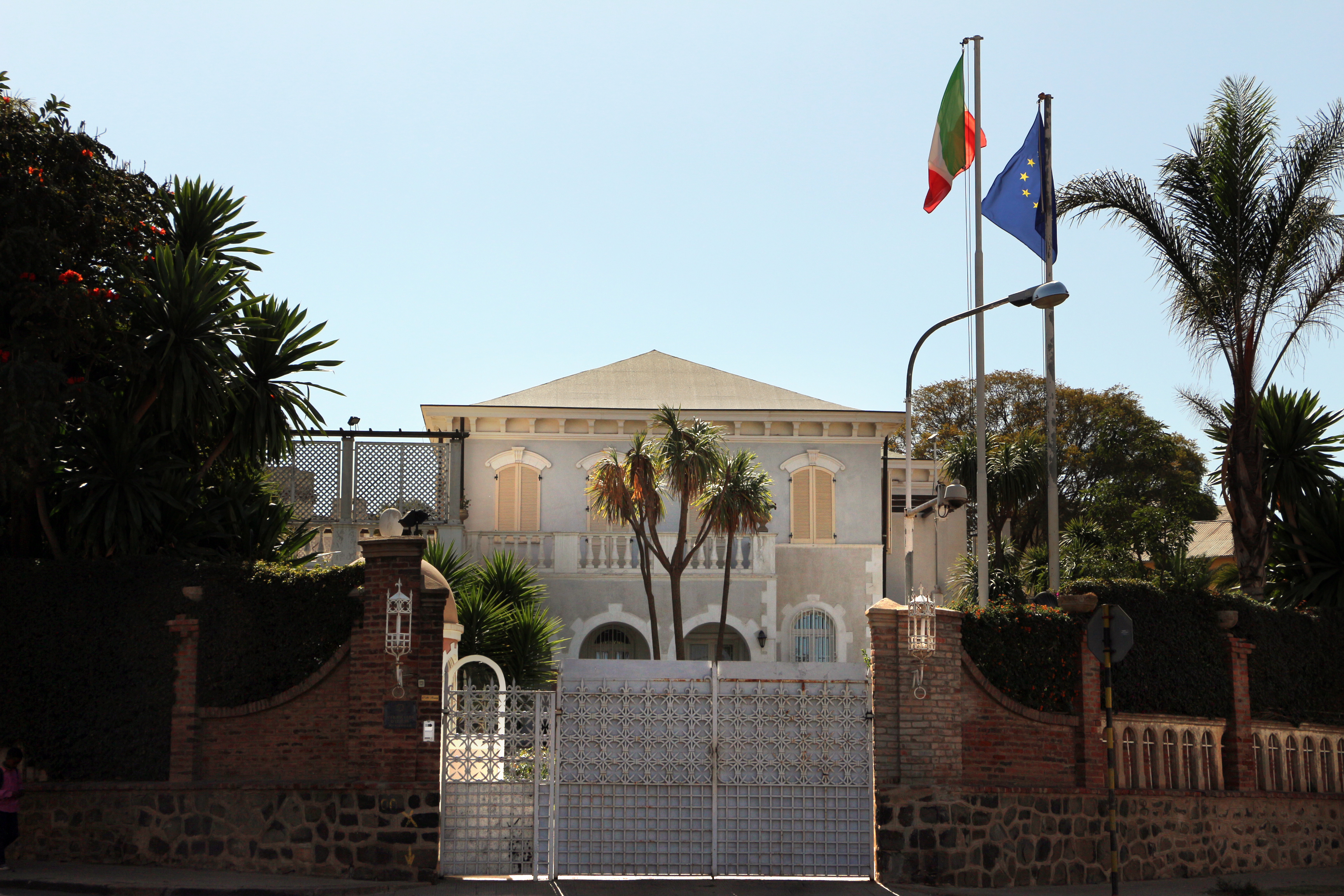
Embassy in Asmara

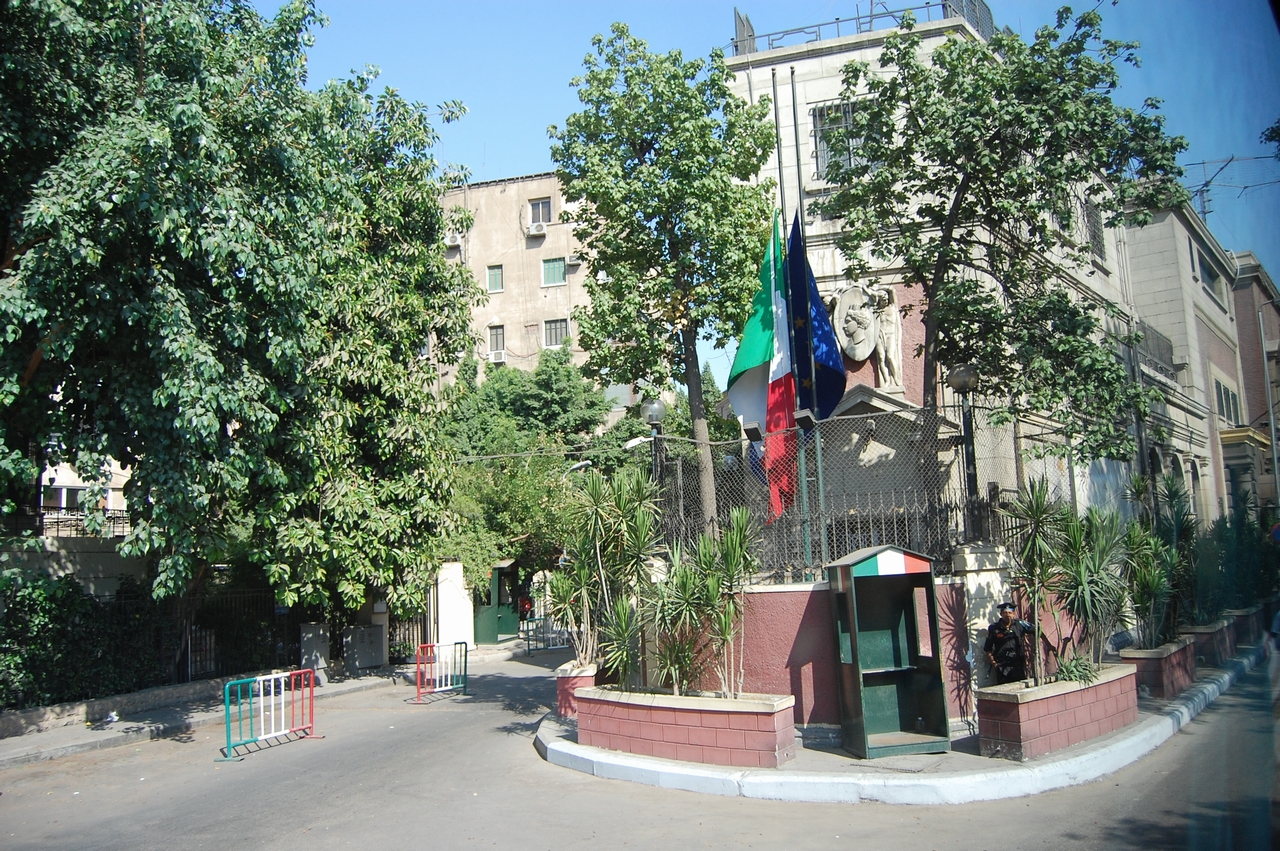
Embassy in Cairo

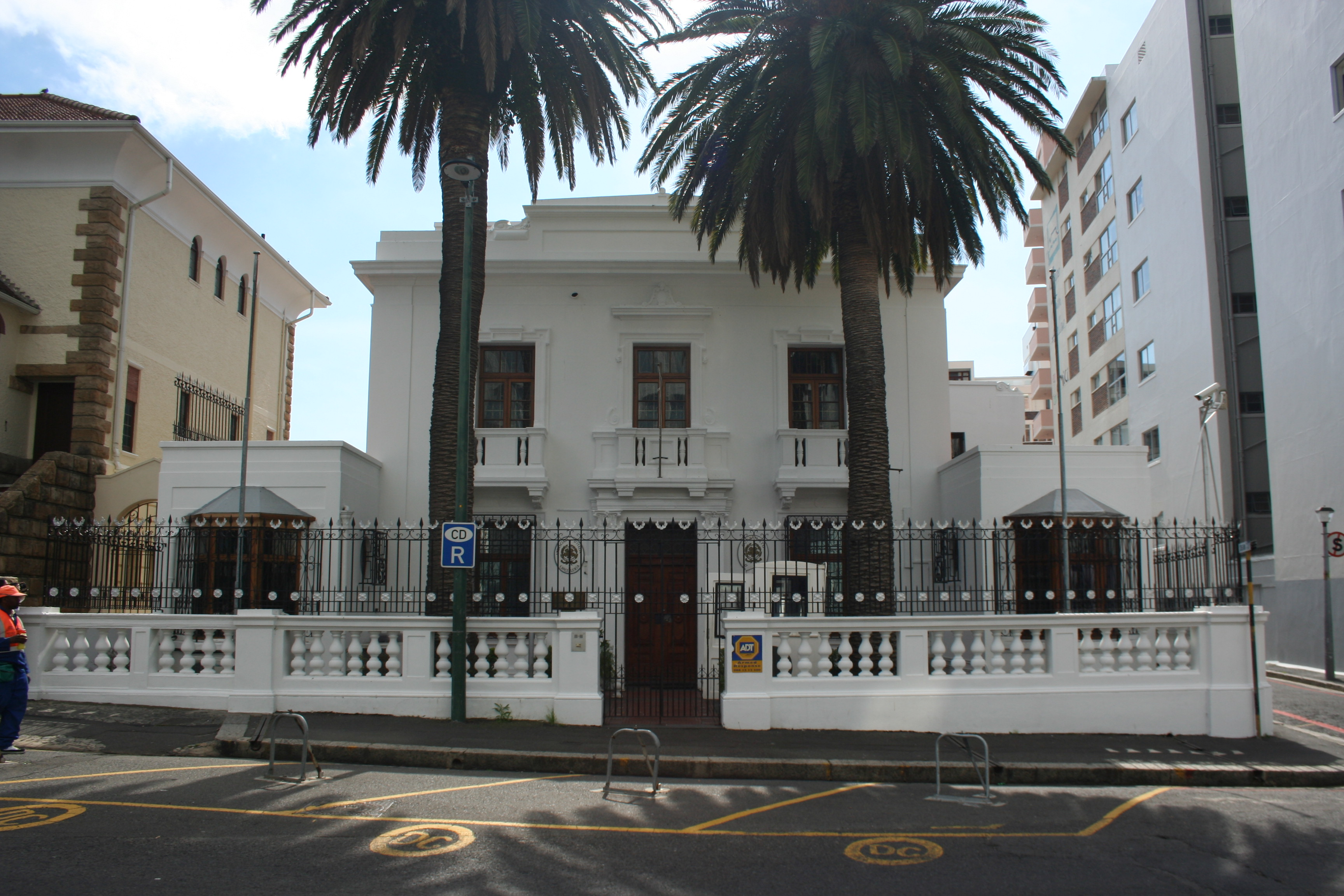
Consulate in Cape Town

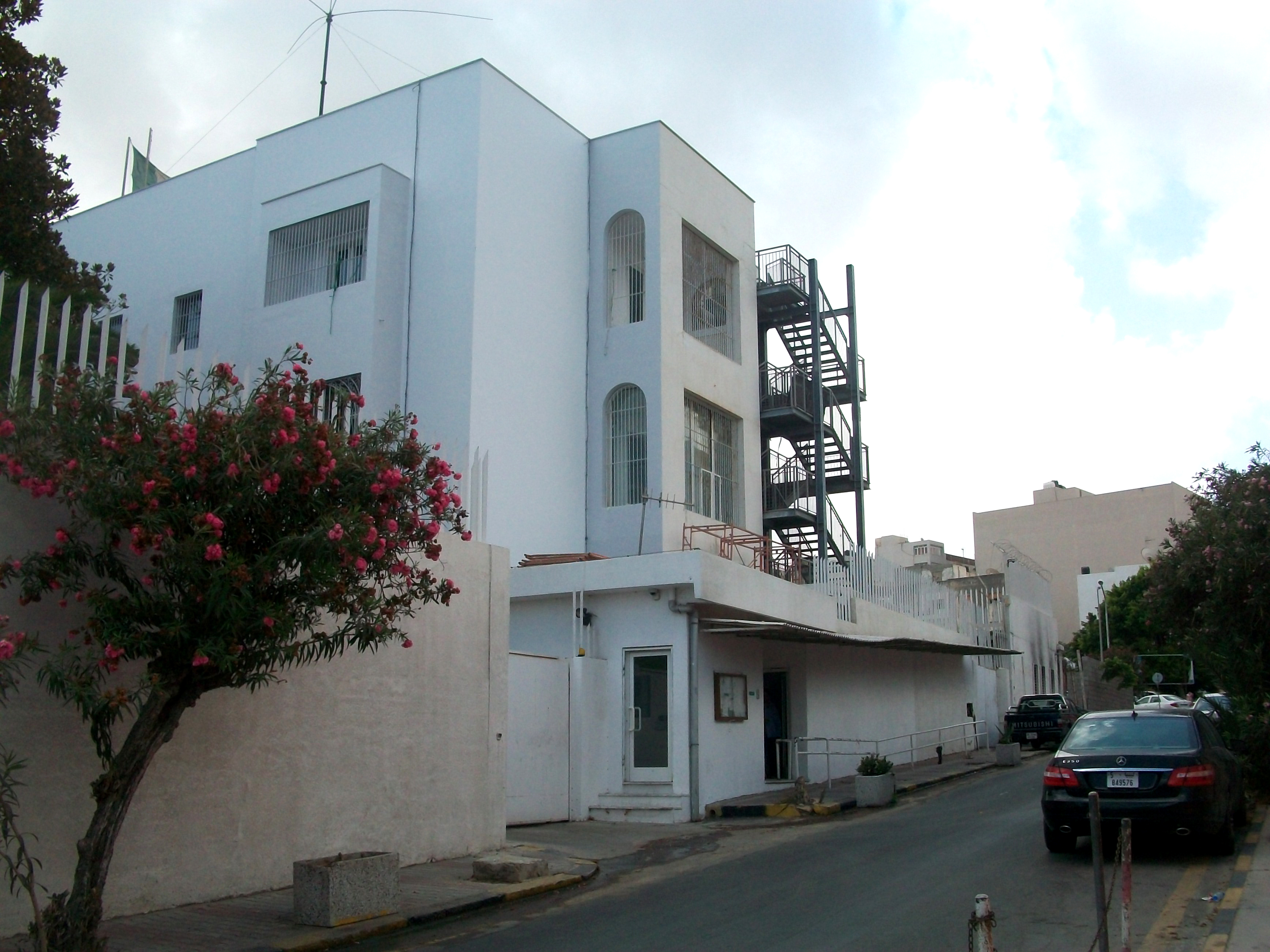
Embassy in Tripoli

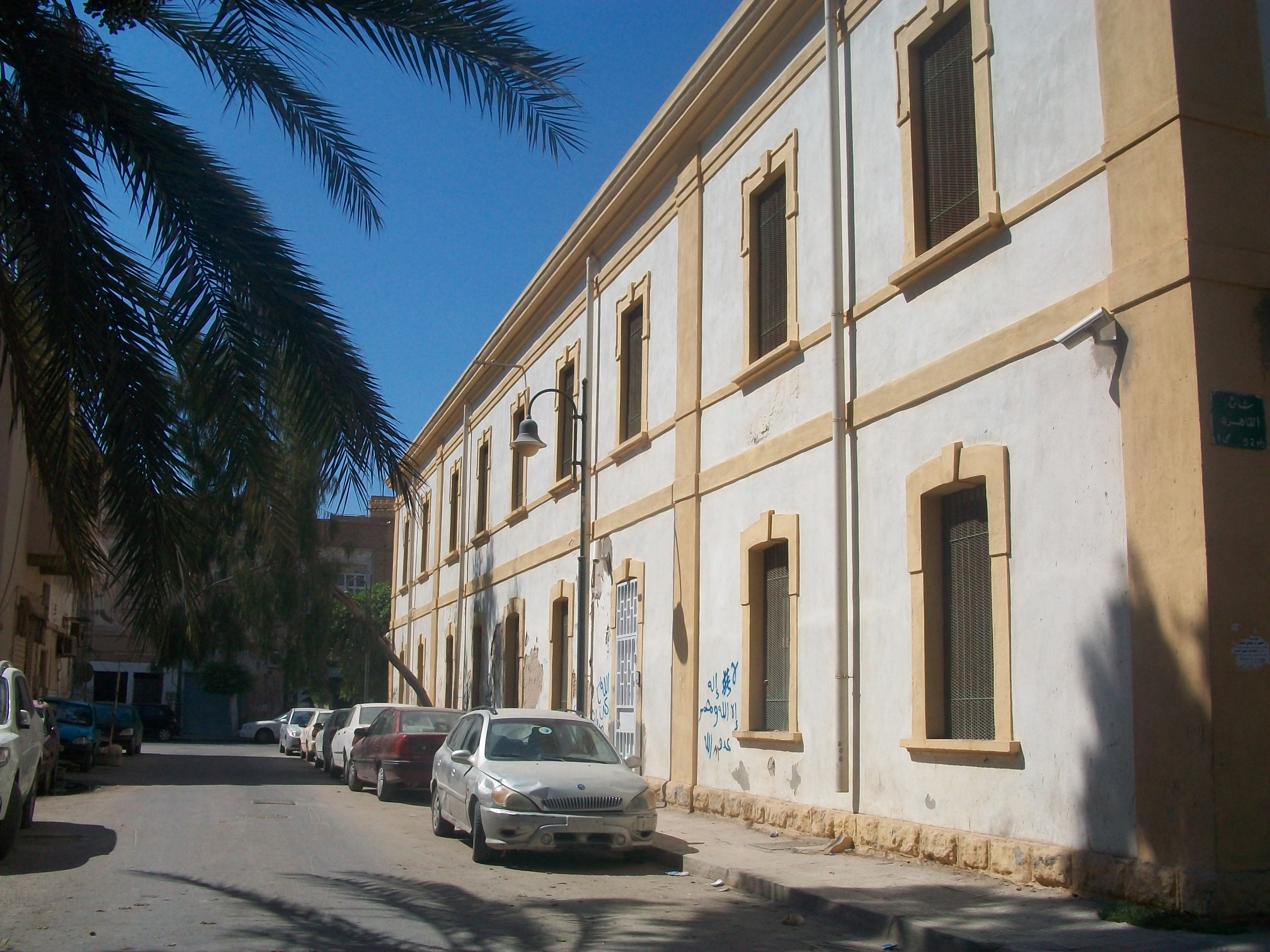
Consulate-General in Benghazi

=== Americas ===
Host country	Host city	Mission	Concurrent accreditation	Ref.
Argentina	Buenos Aires	Embassy		
Argentina	Bahía Blanca	Consulate-General		
Argentina	Córdoba	Consulate-General		
Argentina	La Plata	Consulate-General		
Argentina	Mendoza	Consulate-General		
Argentina	Rosario	Consulate-General		
Argentina	Mar del Plata	Consulate		
Argentina	Lomas de Zamora	Consular agency		
Argentina	Morón	Consular agency		
Bolivia	La Paz	Embassy		
Brazil	Brasília	Embassy	Countries: Suriname	
Brazil	Belo Horizonte	Consulate-General	Countries: Suriname	
Brazil	Curitiba	Consulate-General	Countries: Suriname	
Brazil	Porto Alegre	Consulate-General	Countries: Suriname	
Brazil	Rio de Janeiro	Consulate-General	Countries: Suriname	
Brazil	São Paulo	Consulate-General	Countries: Suriname	
Brazil	Recife	Consulate	Countries: Suriname	
Canada	Ottawa	Embassy		
Canada	Montreal	Consulate-General		
Canada	Toronto	Consulate-General		
Canada	Vancouver	Consulate-General		
Canada	Edmonton	Consular post		
Chile	Santiago de Chile	Embassy		
Colombia	Bogotá	Embassy		
Costa Rica	San José	Embassy		
Cuba	Havana	Embassy		
Dominican Republic	Santo Domingo	Embassy	Countries: Haiti	
Ecuador	Quito	Embassy		
El Salvador	San Salvador	Embassy		
Guatemala	Guatemala City	Embassy	Countries: Honduras	
Mexico	Mexico City	Embassy	Countries: Belize	
Panama	Panama City	Embassy	Countries: Antigua and Barbuda; Barbados; Dominica; Grenada; Guyana; Saint Kitts and Nevis; Saint Lucia; Saint Vincent and the Grenadines; Trinidad and Tobago	
Paraguay	Asunción	Embassy		
Peru	Lima	Embassy		
United States	Washington, D.C.	Embassy	Countries: Bahamas; Jamaica; International Organizations: Organization of American States (Note: Accredited as an observer mission.)	
United States	Boston	Consulate-General	Countries: Bahamas; Jamaica; International Organizations: Organization of American States	
United States	Chicago	Consulate-General	Countries: Bahamas; Jamaica; International Organizations: Organization of American States	
United States	Houston	Consulate-General	Countries: Bahamas; Jamaica; International Organizations: Organization of American States	
United States	Los Angeles	Consulate-General	Countries: Bahamas; Jamaica; International Organizations: Organization of American States	
United States	Miami	Consulate-General	Countries: Bahamas; Jamaica; International Organizations: Organization of American States	
United States	New York City	Consulate-General	Countries: Bahamas; Jamaica; International Organizations: Organization of American States	
United States	Philadelphia	Consulate-General	Countries: Bahamas; Jamaica; International Organizations: Organization of American States	
United States	San Francisco	Consulate-General	Countries: Bahamas; Jamaica; International Organizations: Organization of American States	
United States	Detroit	Consulate	Countries: Bahamas; Jamaica; International Organizations: Organization of American States	
Uruguay	Montevideo	Embassy		
Venezuela	Caracas	Embassy		
Venezuela	Maracaibo	Consulate		

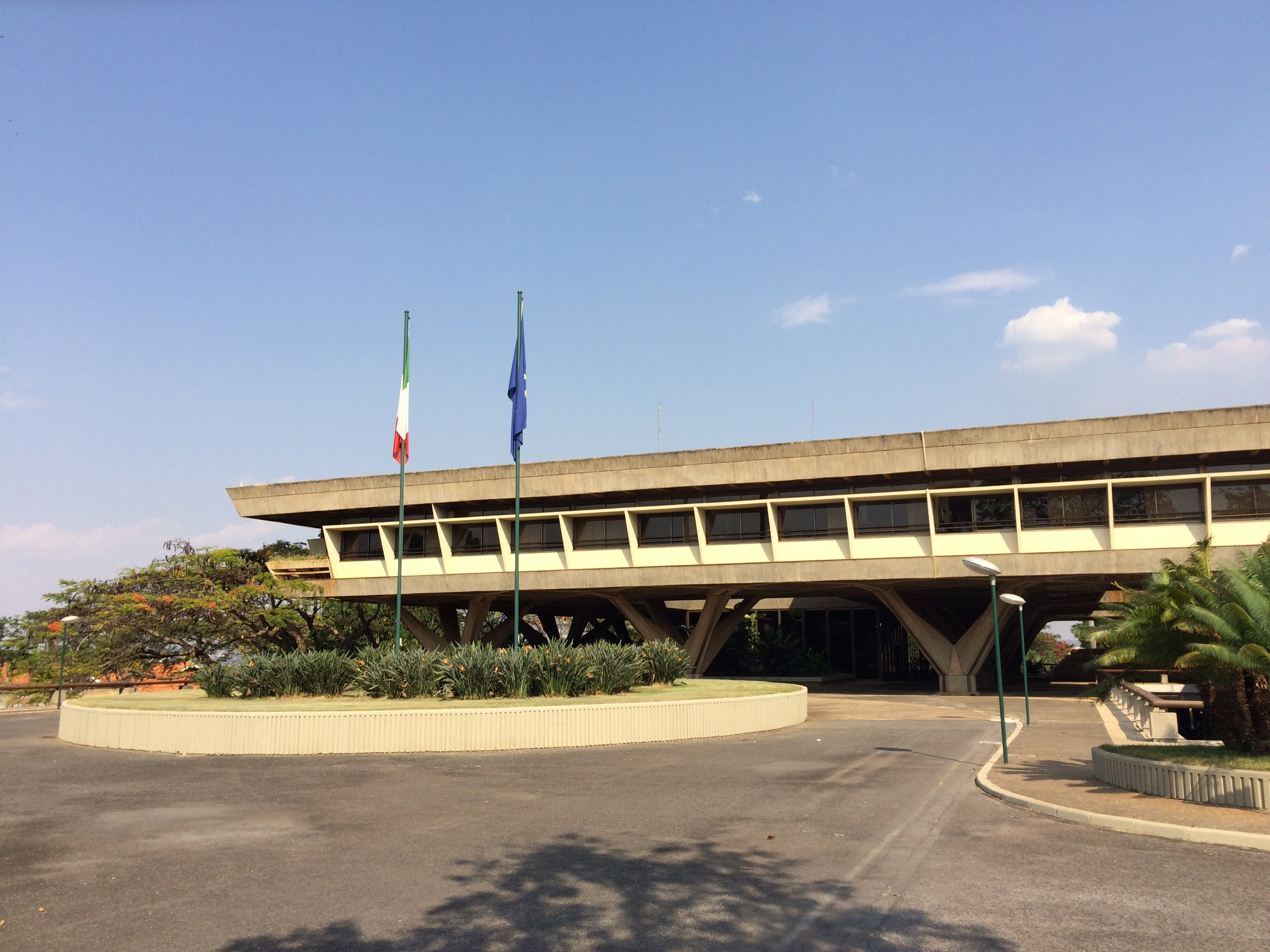
Embassy in Brasília

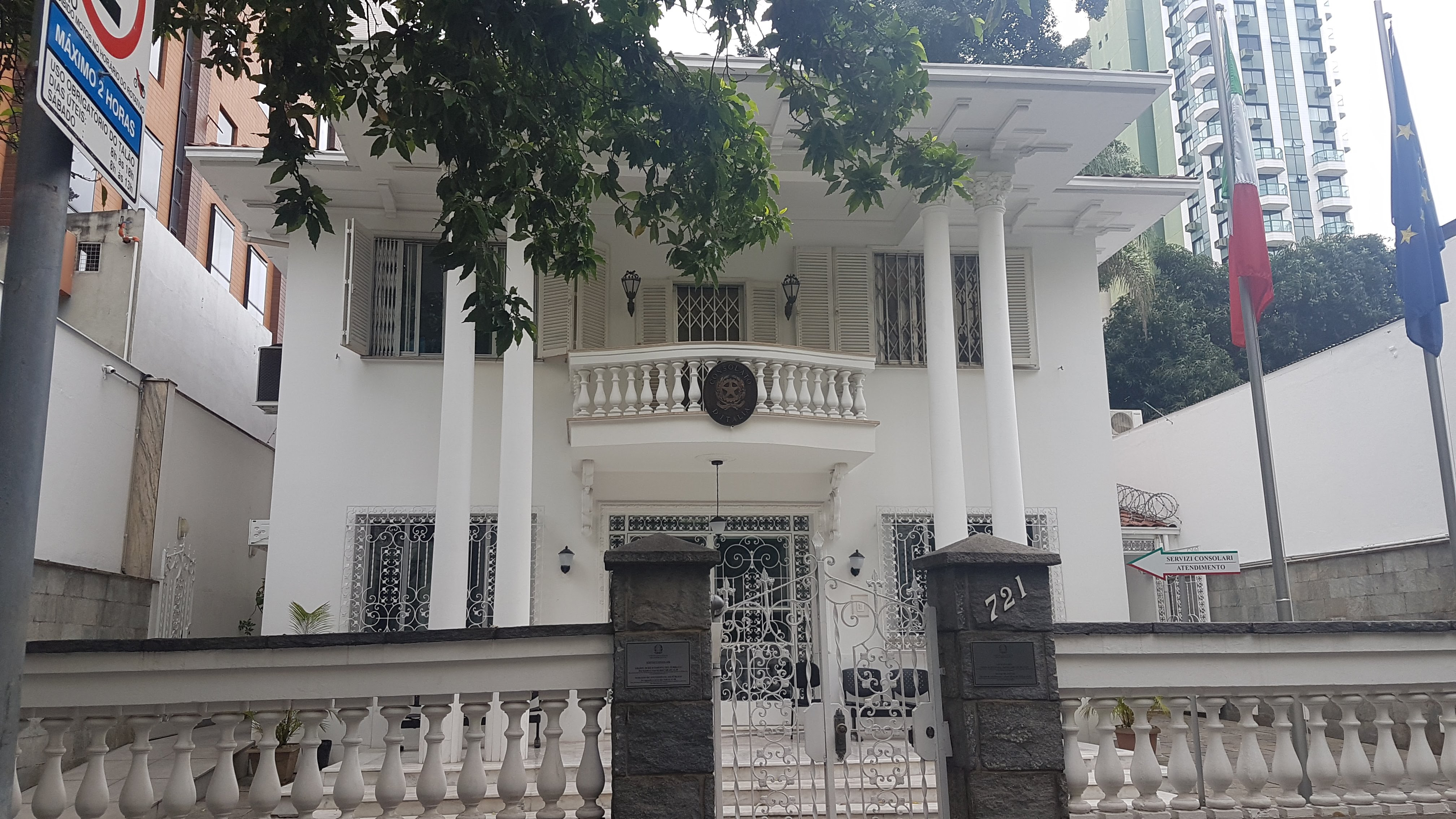
Consulate-General in Belo Horizonte

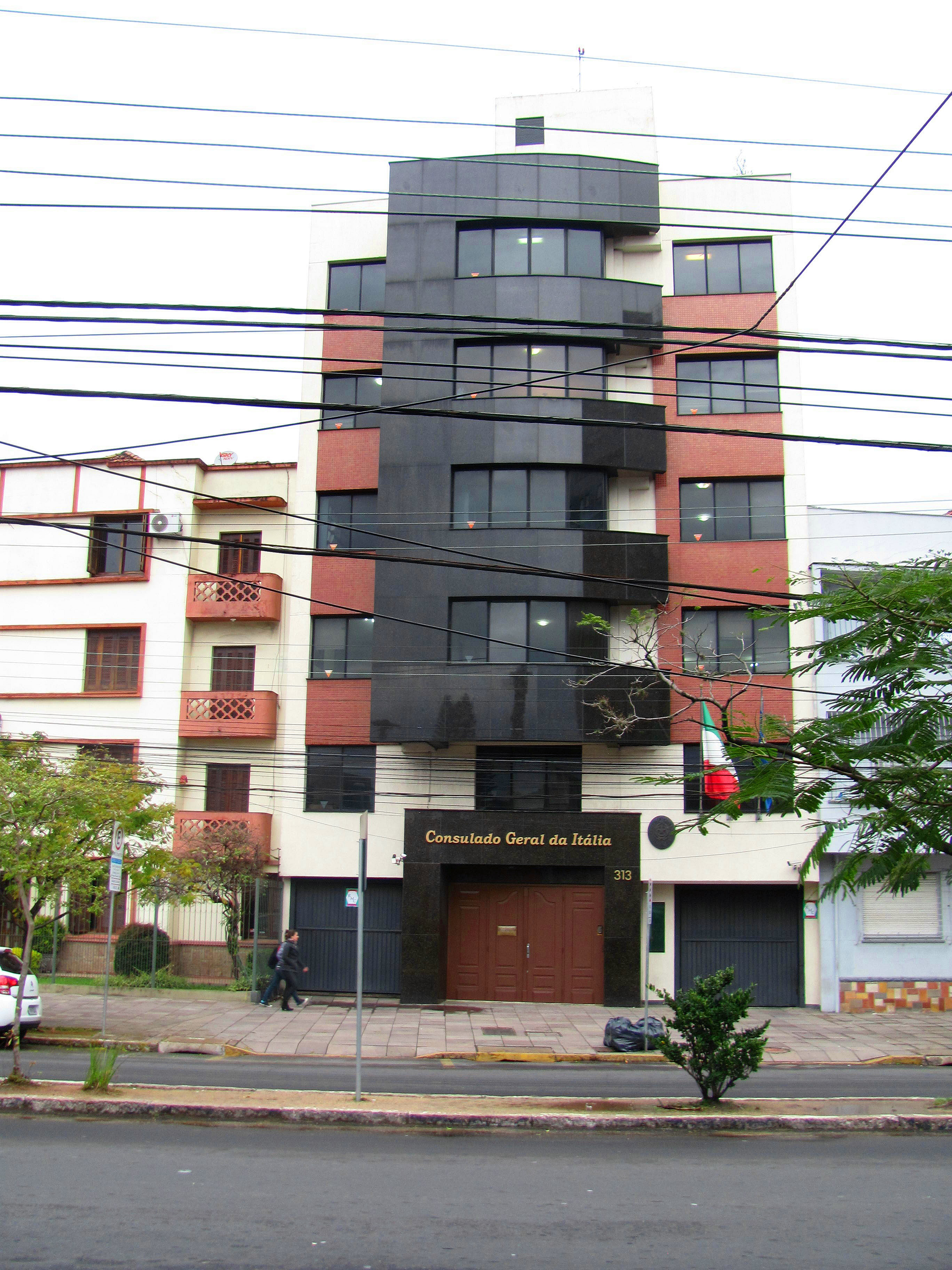
Consulate-General in Porto Alegre

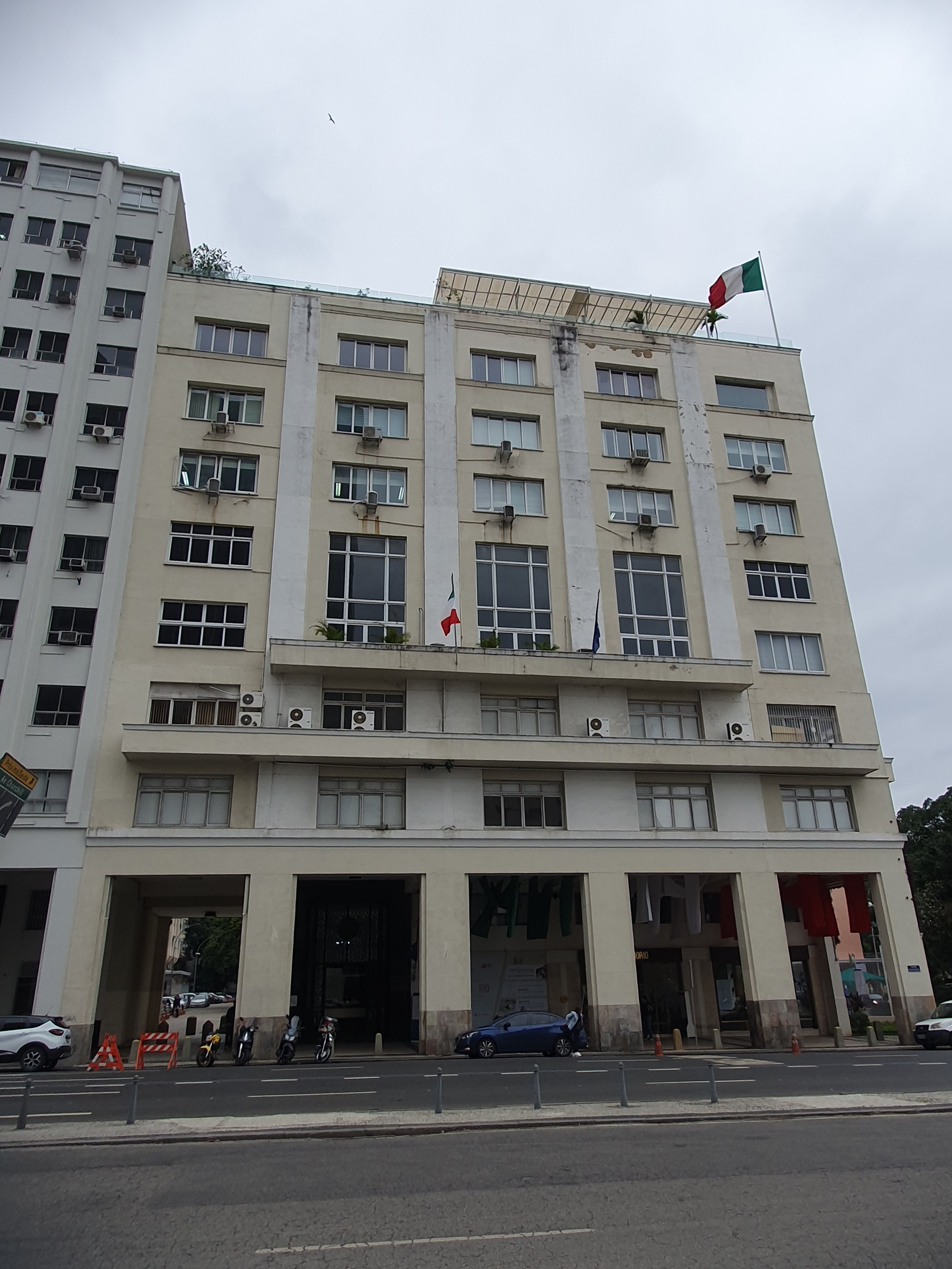
Consulate-General in Rio de Janeiro

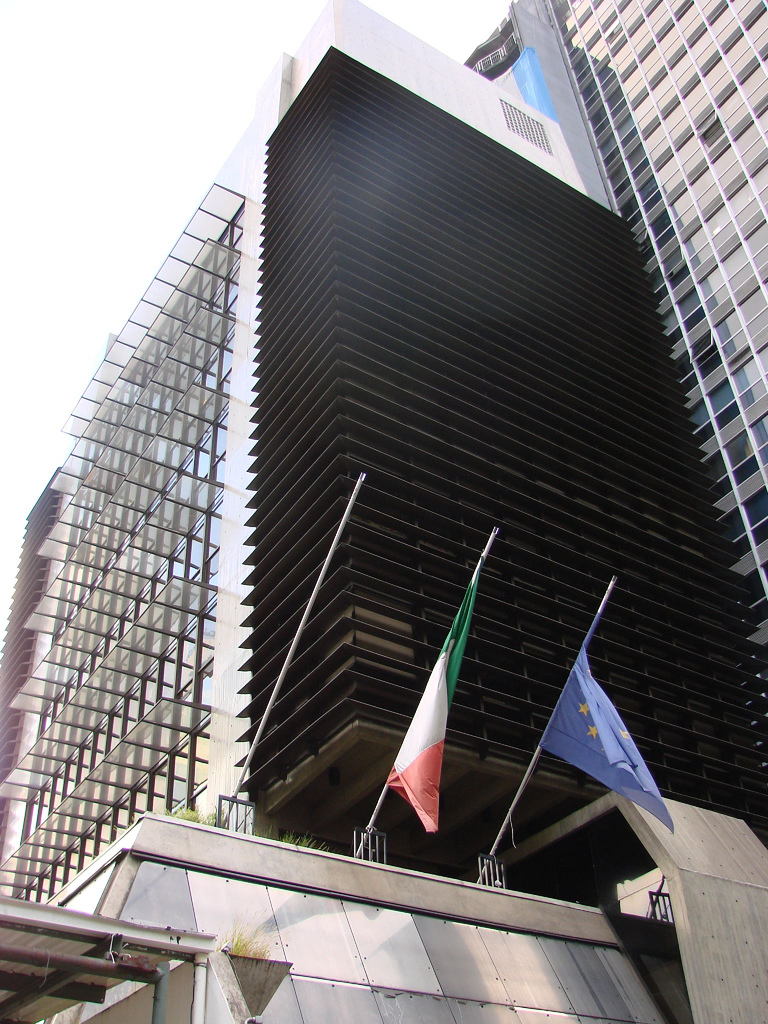
Consulate-General in São Paulo

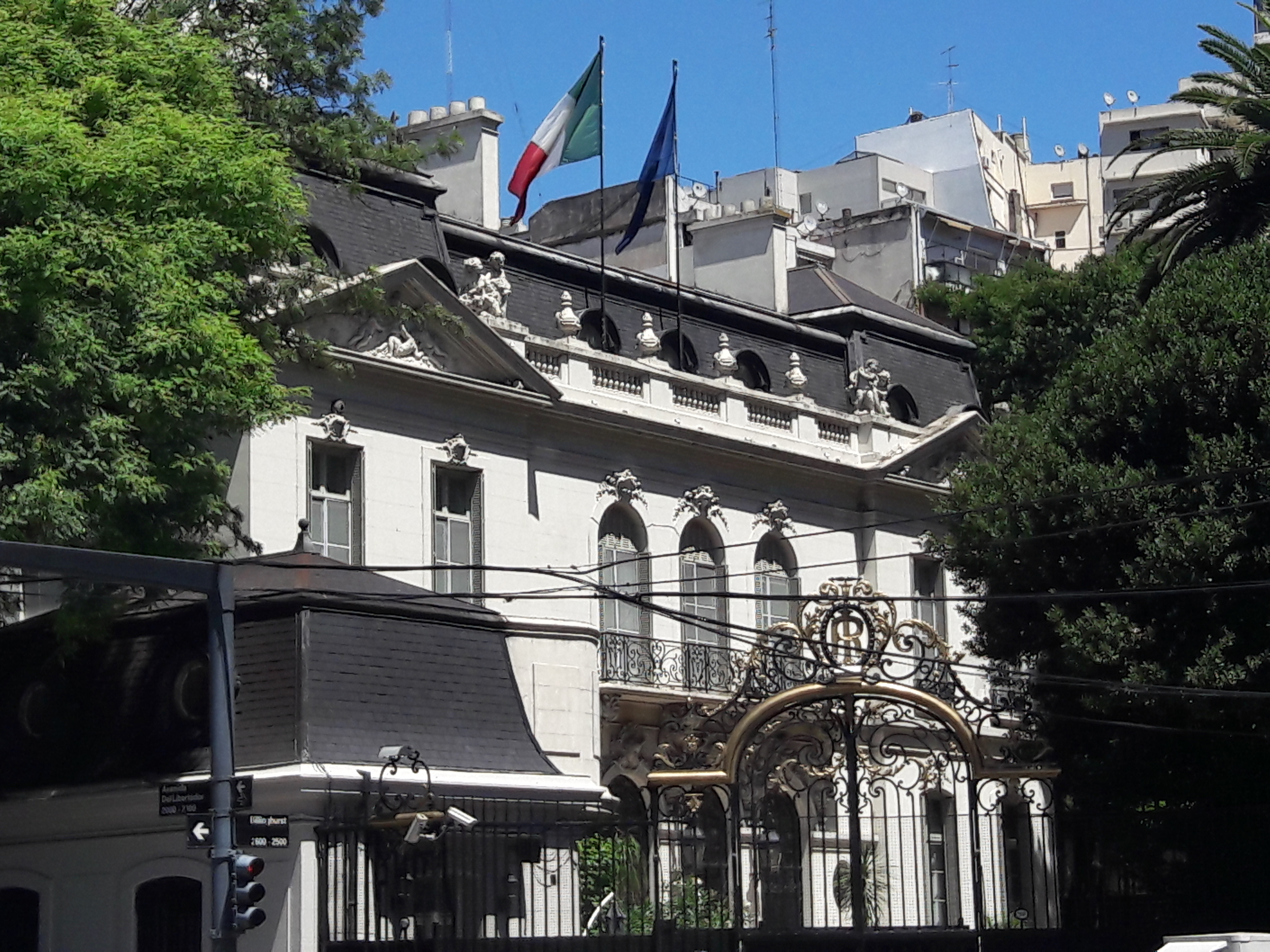
Embassy in Buenos Aires

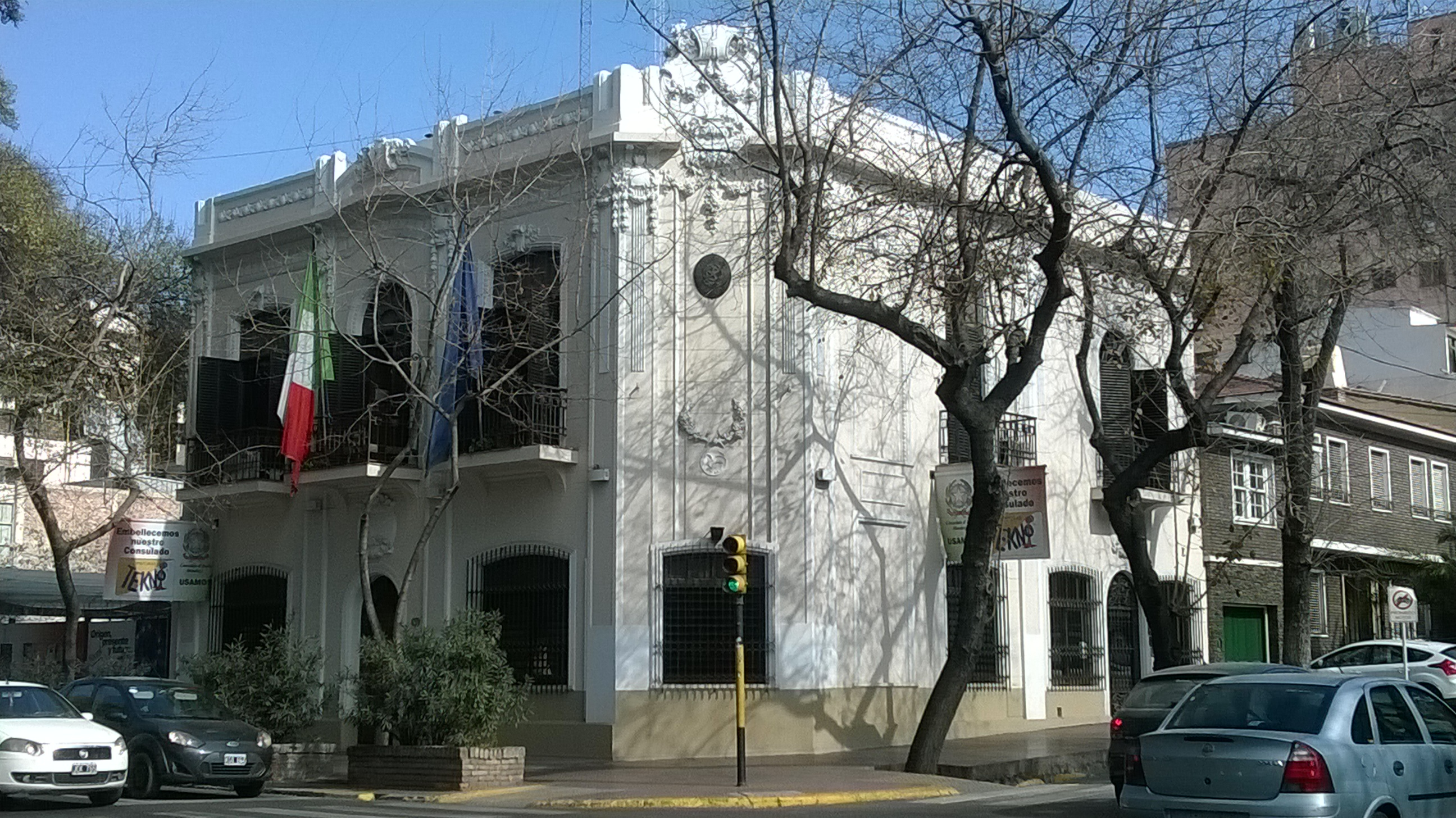
Consulate-General in Mendoza

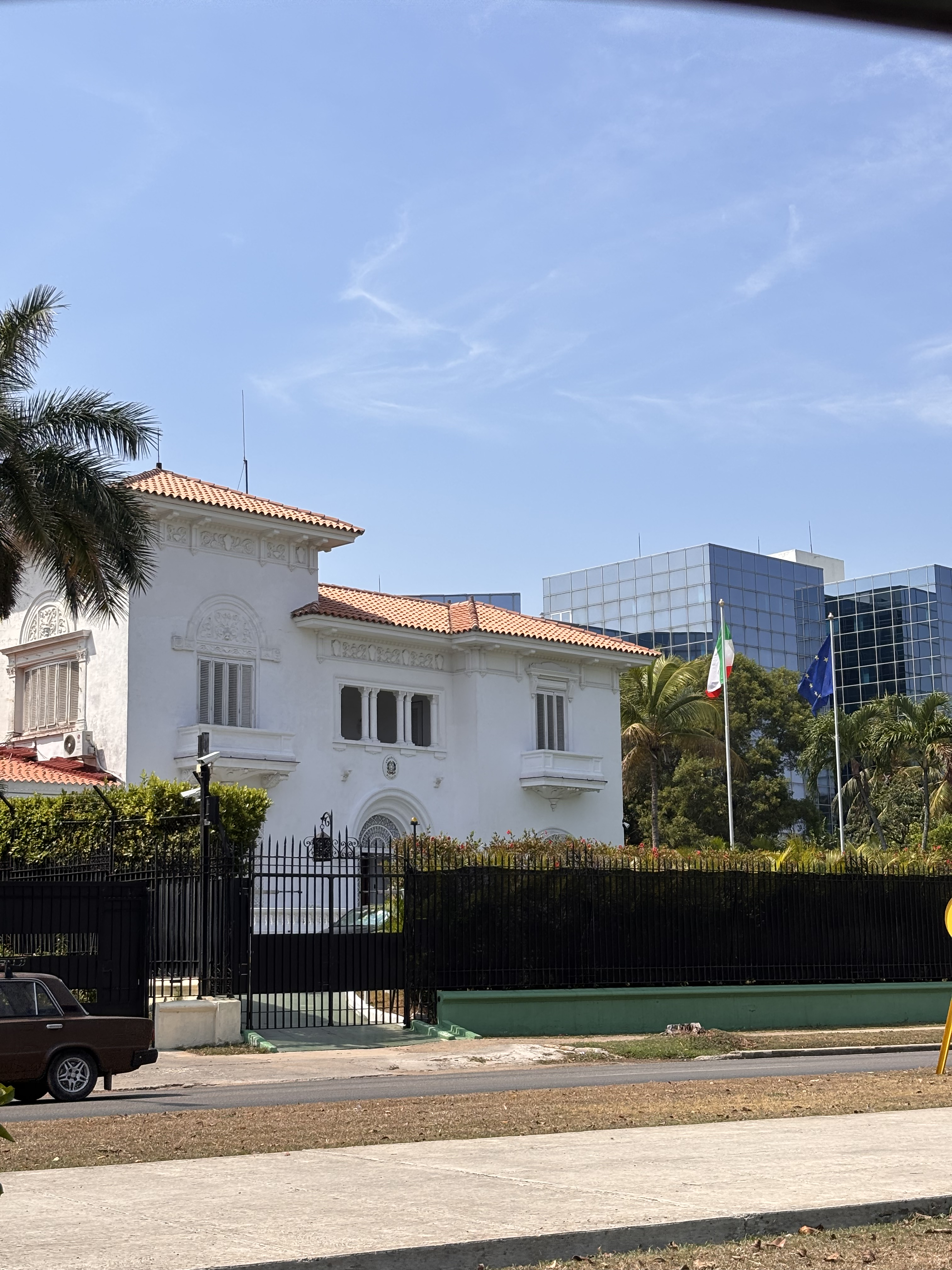
Embassy in Havana

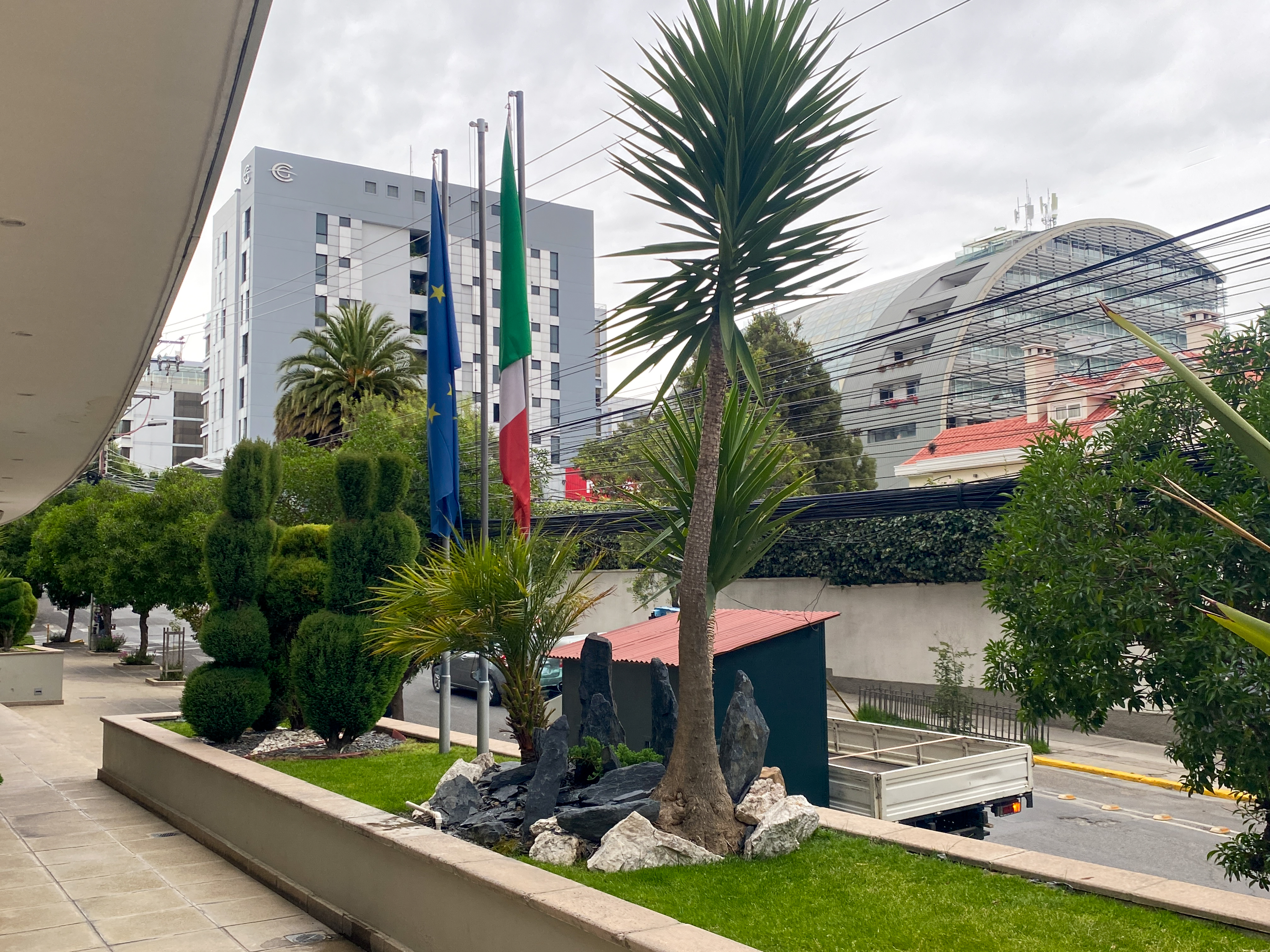
Embassy in La Paz

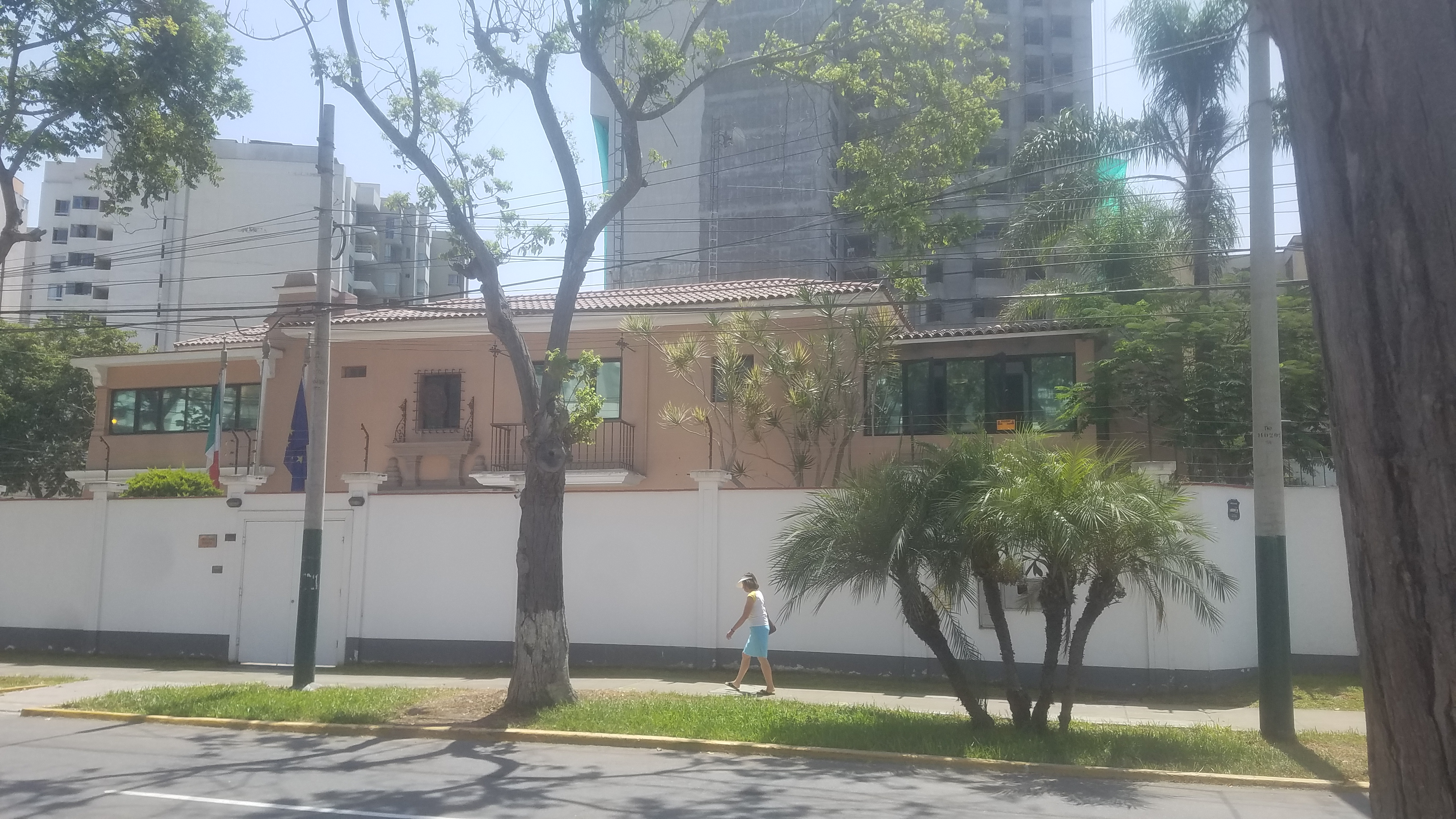
Embassy in Lima

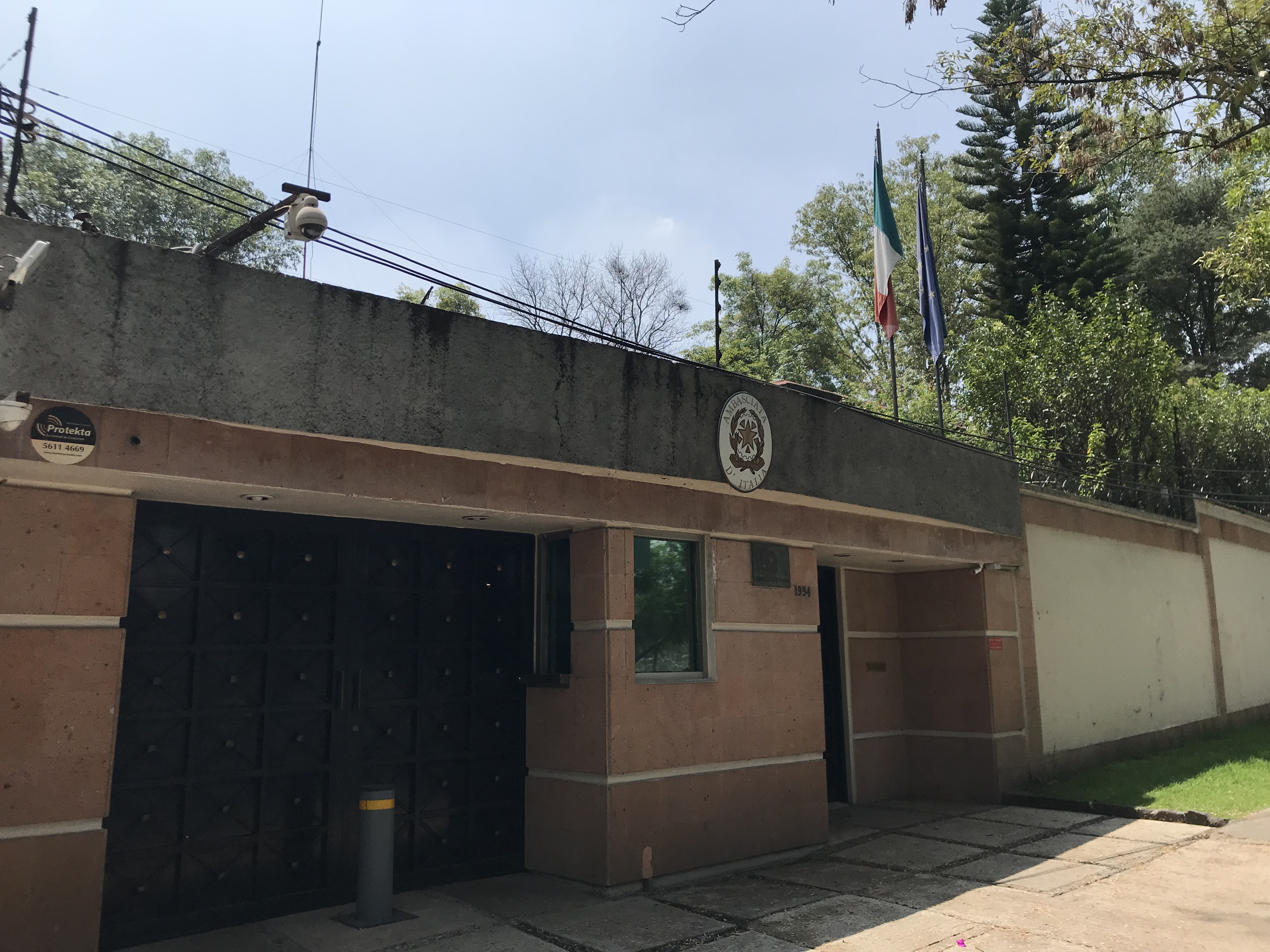
Embassy in Mexico City

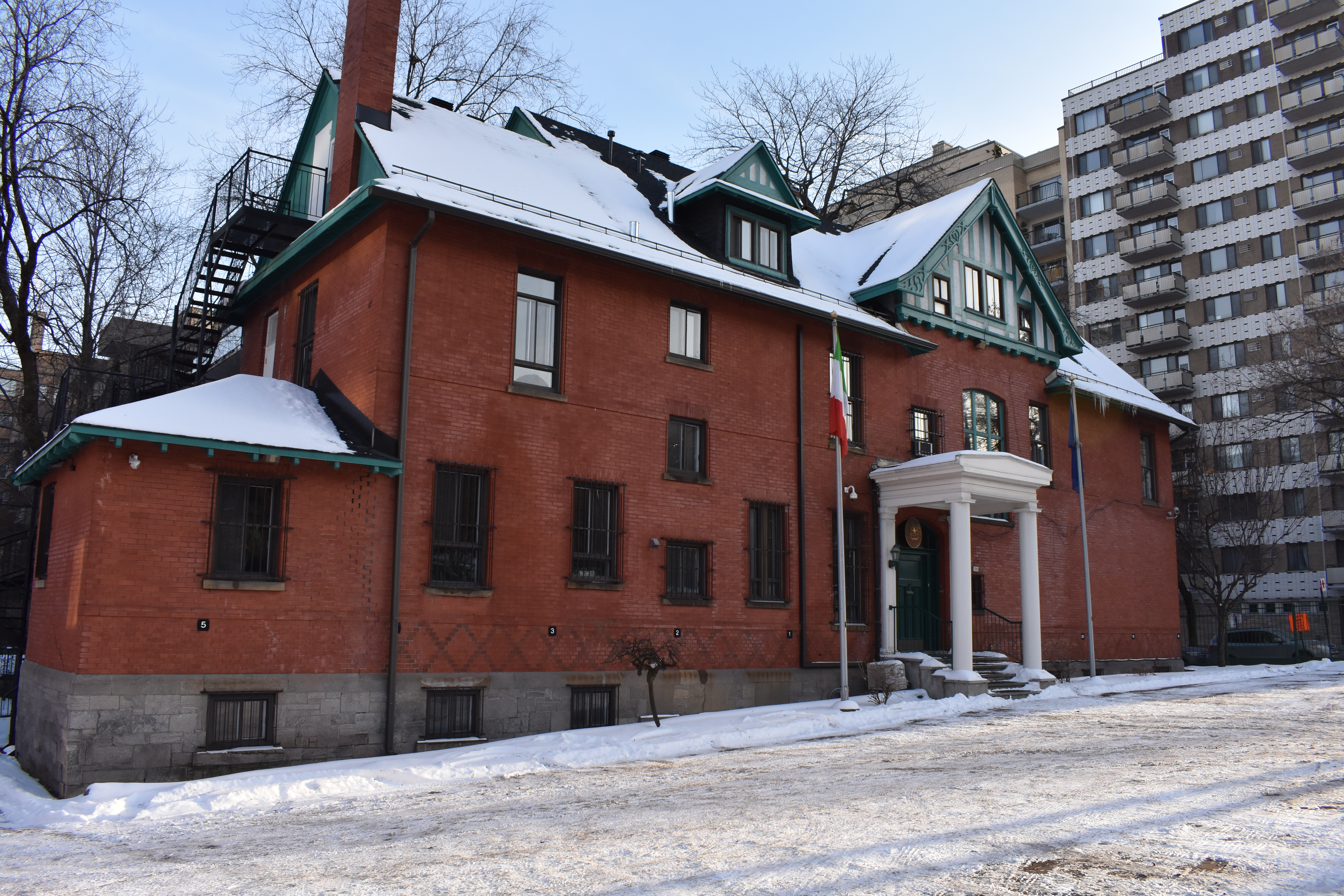
Consulate-General in Montreal

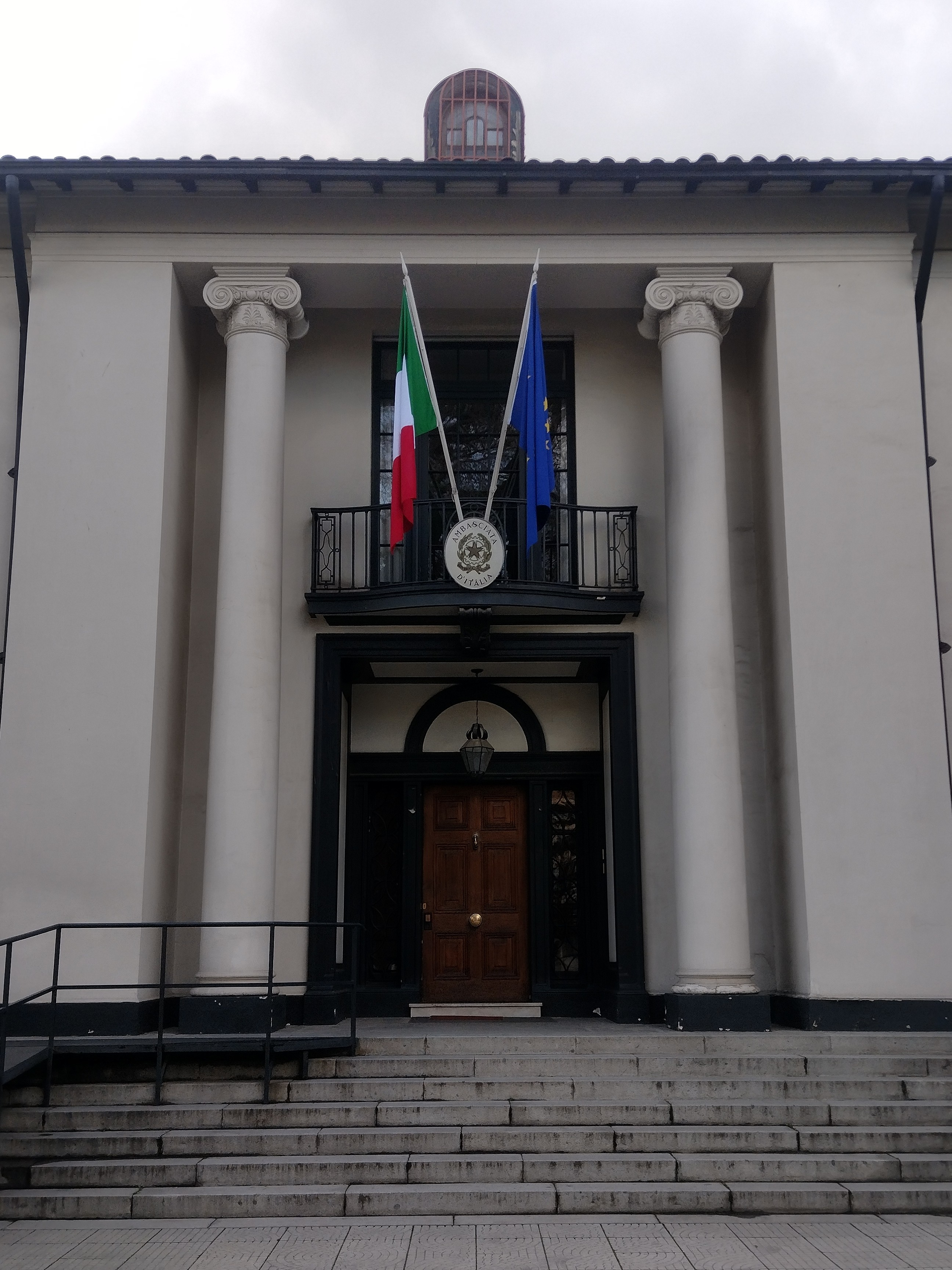
Embassy in Santiago

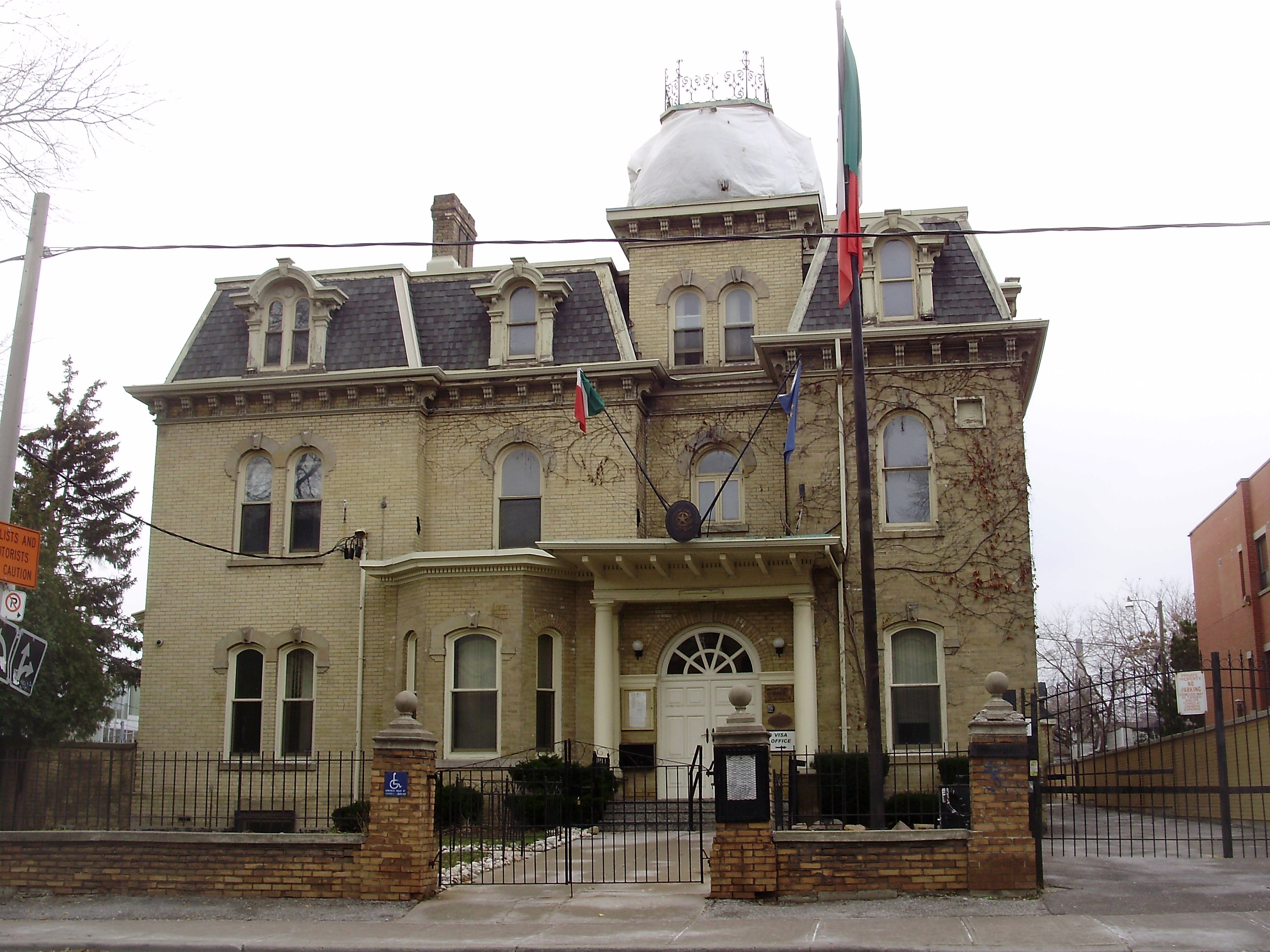
Consulate-General in Toronto

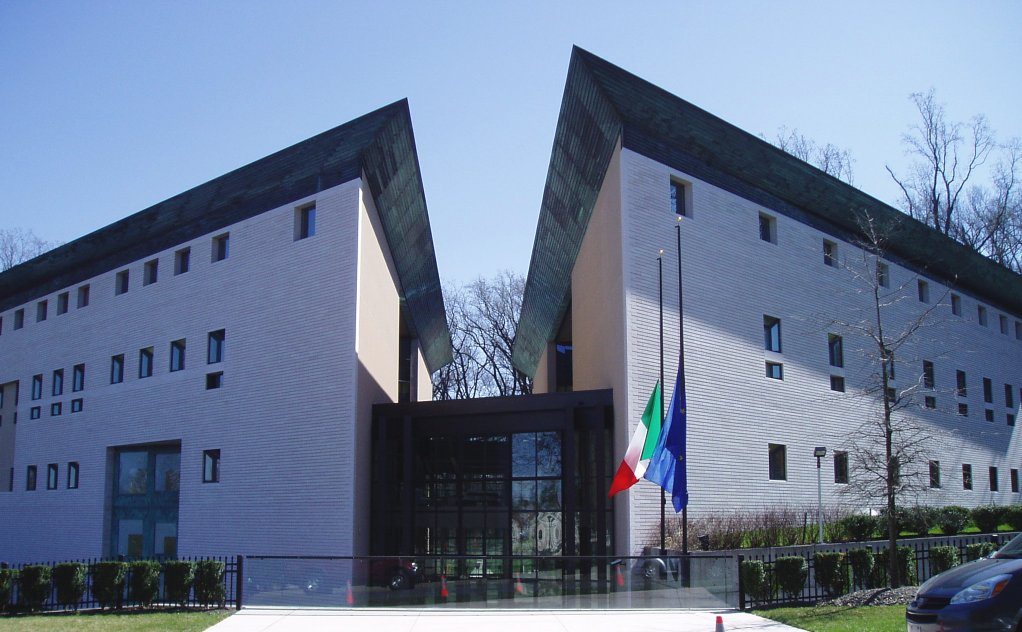
Embassy in Washington, D.C.

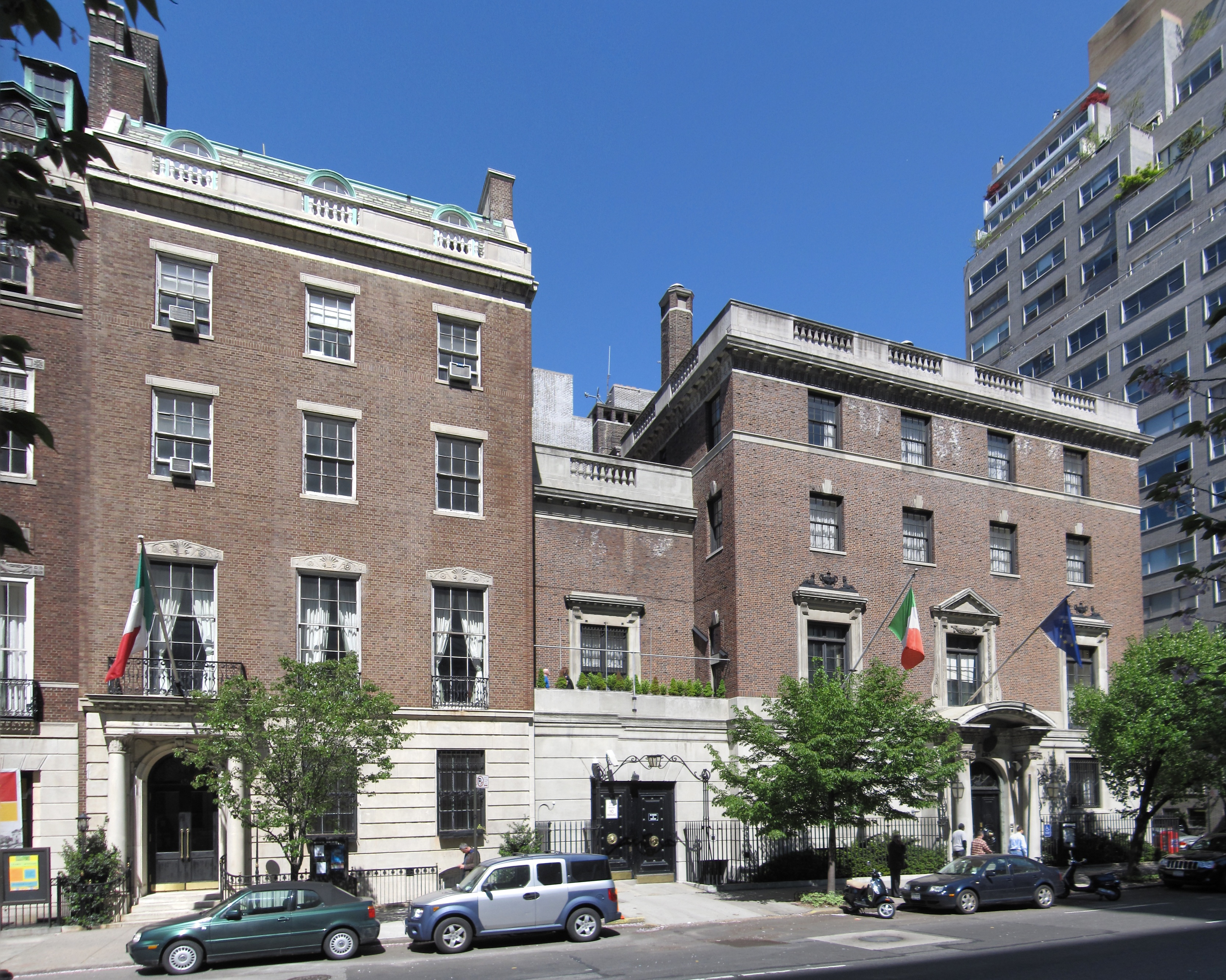
Consulate-General in New York City

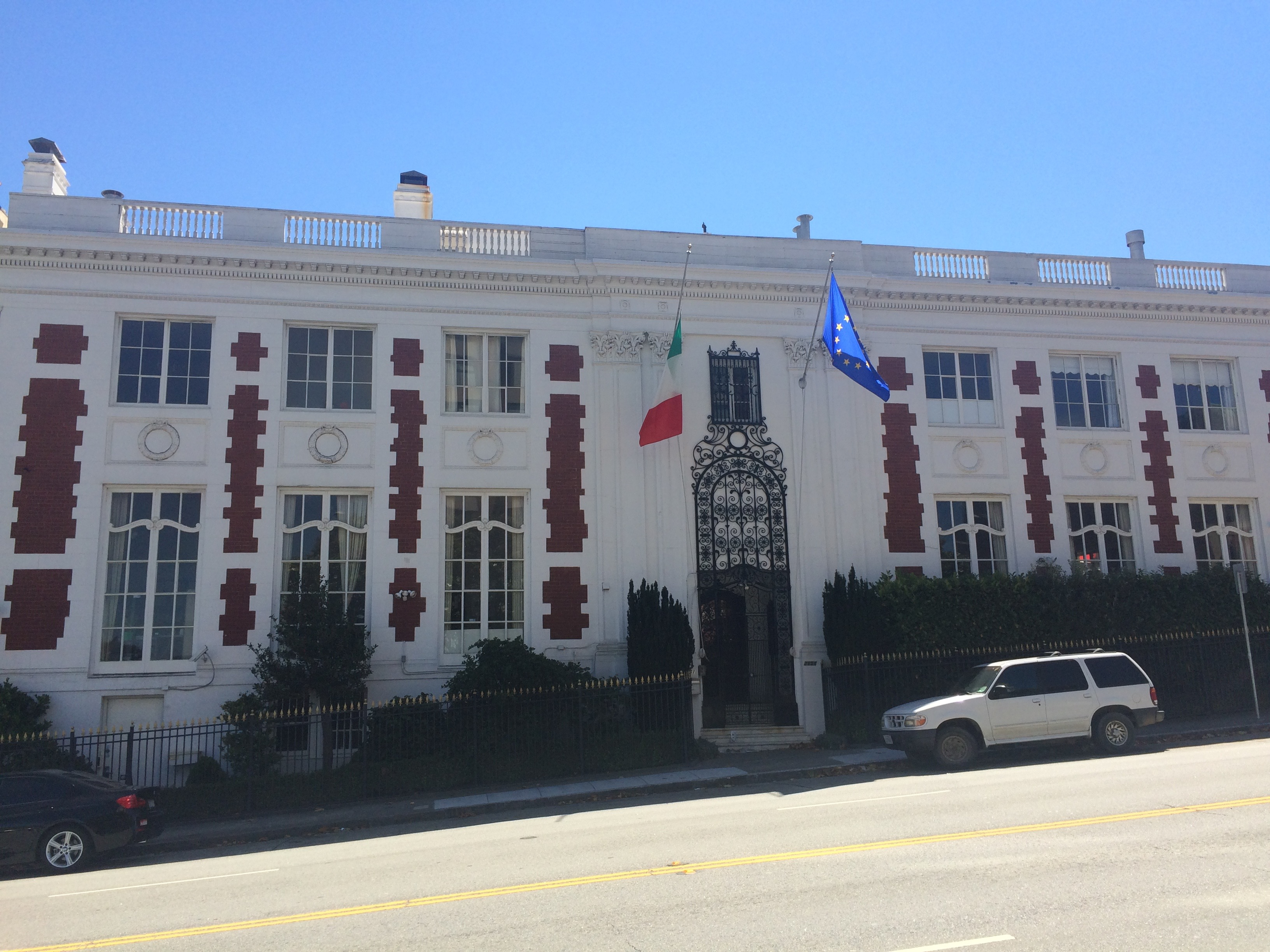
Consulate-General in San Francisco

=== Asia ===
Host country	Host city	Mission	Concurrent accreditation	Ref.
Armenia	Yerevan	Embassy		
Azerbaijan	Baku	Embassy		
Bahrain	Manama	Embassy		
Bangladesh	Dhaka	Embassy		
China	Beijing	Embassy		
China	Chongqing	Consulate-General		
China	Guangzhou	Consulate-General		
China	Hong Kong	Consulate-General		
China	Shanghai	Consulate-General		
Georgia	Tbilisi	Embassy		
India	New Delhi	Embassy	Countries: Nepal; Consular jurisdiction only: Bhutan (Note: Bhutan is listed under the consular jurisdiction of the Italian embassy in New Delhi; the two countries have yet to establish formal diplomatic relations.)	
India	Bengaluru	Consulate-General	Countries: Nepal; Consular jurisdiction only: Bhutan	
India	Kolkata	Consulate-General	Countries: Nepal; Consular jurisdiction only: Bhutan	
India	Mumbai	Consulate-General	Countries: Nepal; Consular jurisdiction only: Bhutan	
Indonesia	Jakarta	Embassy	Countries: East Timor; International Organizations: Association of Southeast Asian Nations	
Iran	Tehran	Embassy		
Iraq	Baghdad	Embassy		
Iraq	Erbil	Consulate-General		
Israel	Tel Aviv	Embassy		
Israel	Jerusalem	Consulate-General		
Japan	Tokyo	Embassy		
Japan	Osaka	Consulate-General		
Jordan	Amman	Embassy		
Kazakhstan	Astana	Embassy	Countries: Kyrgyzstan	
Kuwait	Kuwait City	Embassy		
Lebanon	Beirut	Embassy		
Malaysia	Kuala Lumpur	Embassy		
Mongolia	Ulaanbaatar	Embassy		
Myanmar	Yangon	Embassy		
Pakistan	Islamabad	Embassy		
Pakistan	Karachi	Consulate		
Philippines	Manila	Embassy	Countries: Marshall Islands; Micronesia; Palau	
Oman	Muscat	Embassy		
Palestine	East Jerusalem	Consulate-General		
Qatar	Doha	Embassy		
Republic of China (Taiwan) (Note: Italy does not have formal relations with Taiwan, since the establishment of relations with the People's Republic of China in 1970. Nonetheless, its trade office in Taipei functions as a de facto embassy.)	Taipei	Economic, Trade & Cultural Promotion Office		
Saudi Arabia	Riyadh	Embassy		
Saudi Arabia	Jeddah	Consulate-General		
Singapore	Singapore	Embassy	Countries: Brunei	
South Korea	Seoul	Embassy		
Sri Lanka	Colombo	Embassy	Countries: Maldives	
Syria	Damascus	Embassy		
Thailand	Bangkok	Embassy	Countries: Cambodia; Laos	
Turkey	Ankara	Embassy		
Turkey	Istanbul	Consulate-General		
Turkey	İzmir	Consulate		
Turkmenistan	Ashgabat	Embassy		
United Arab Emirates	Abu Dhabi	Embassy		
United Arab Emirates	Dubai	Consulate-General		
Uzbekistan	Tashkent	Embassy	Countries: Tajikistan	
Vietnam	Hanoi	Embassy		
Vietnam	Ho Chi Minh City	Consulate-General		

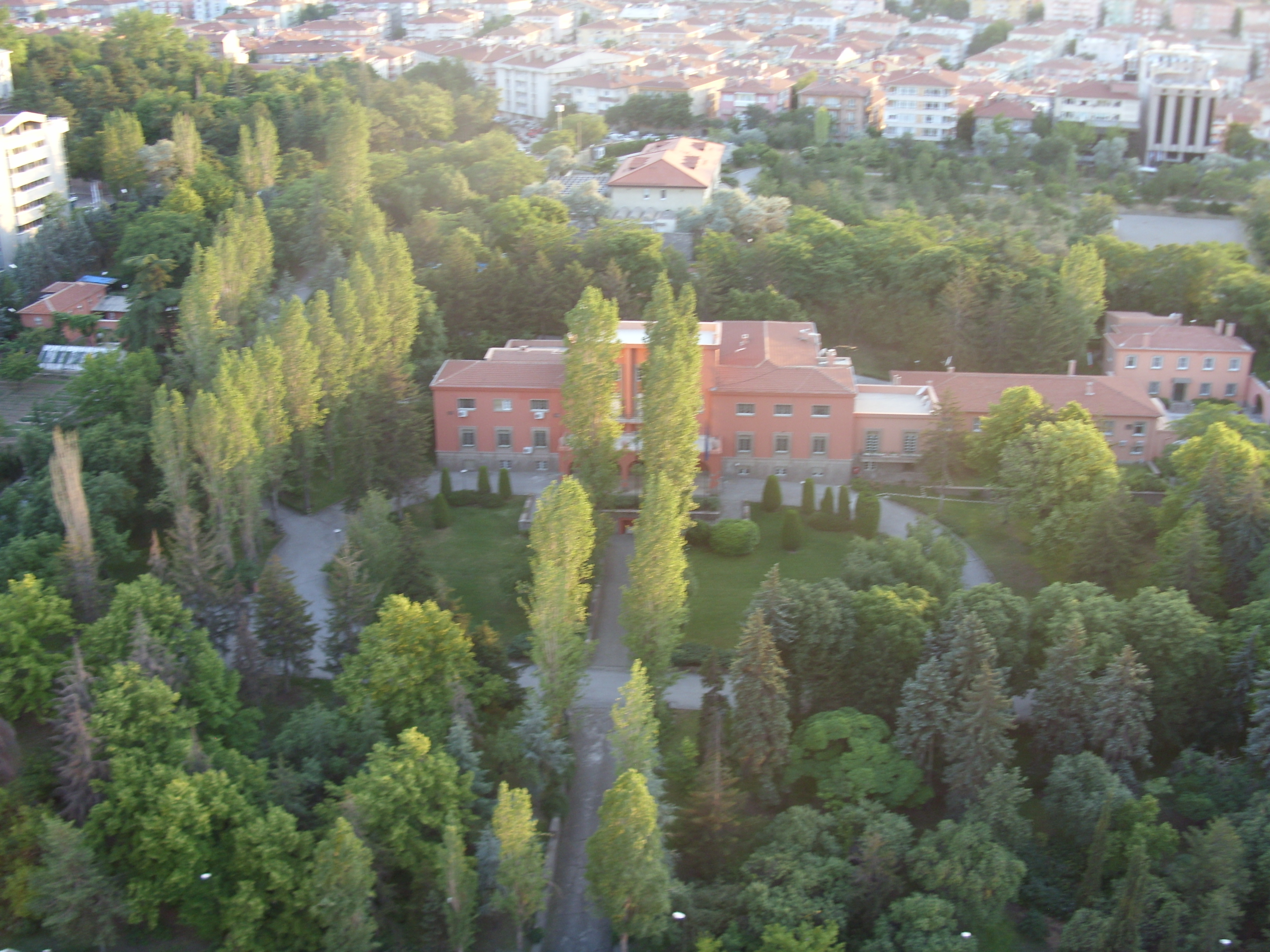
Embassy in Ankara

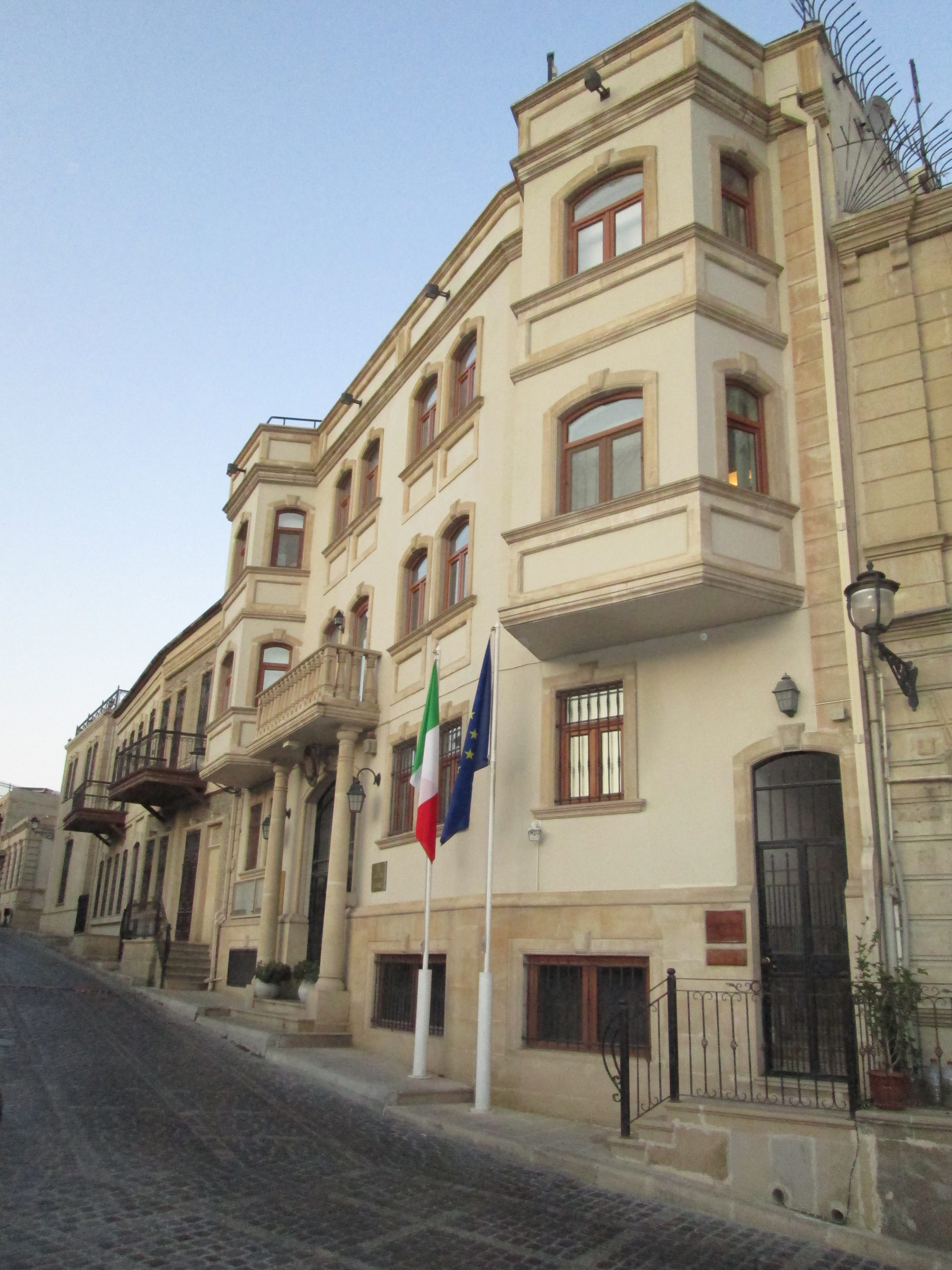
Embassy in Baku

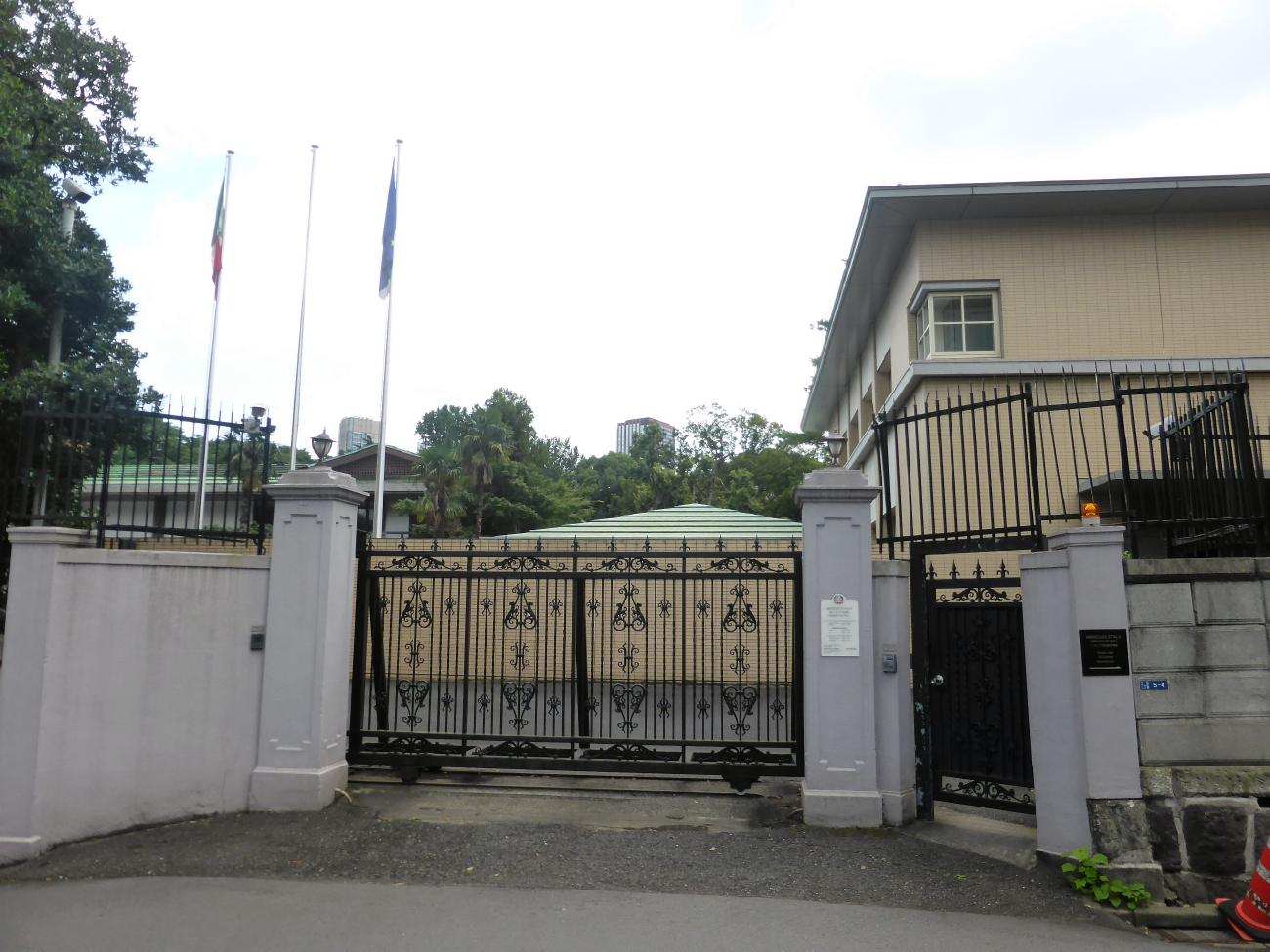
Embassy in Tokyo

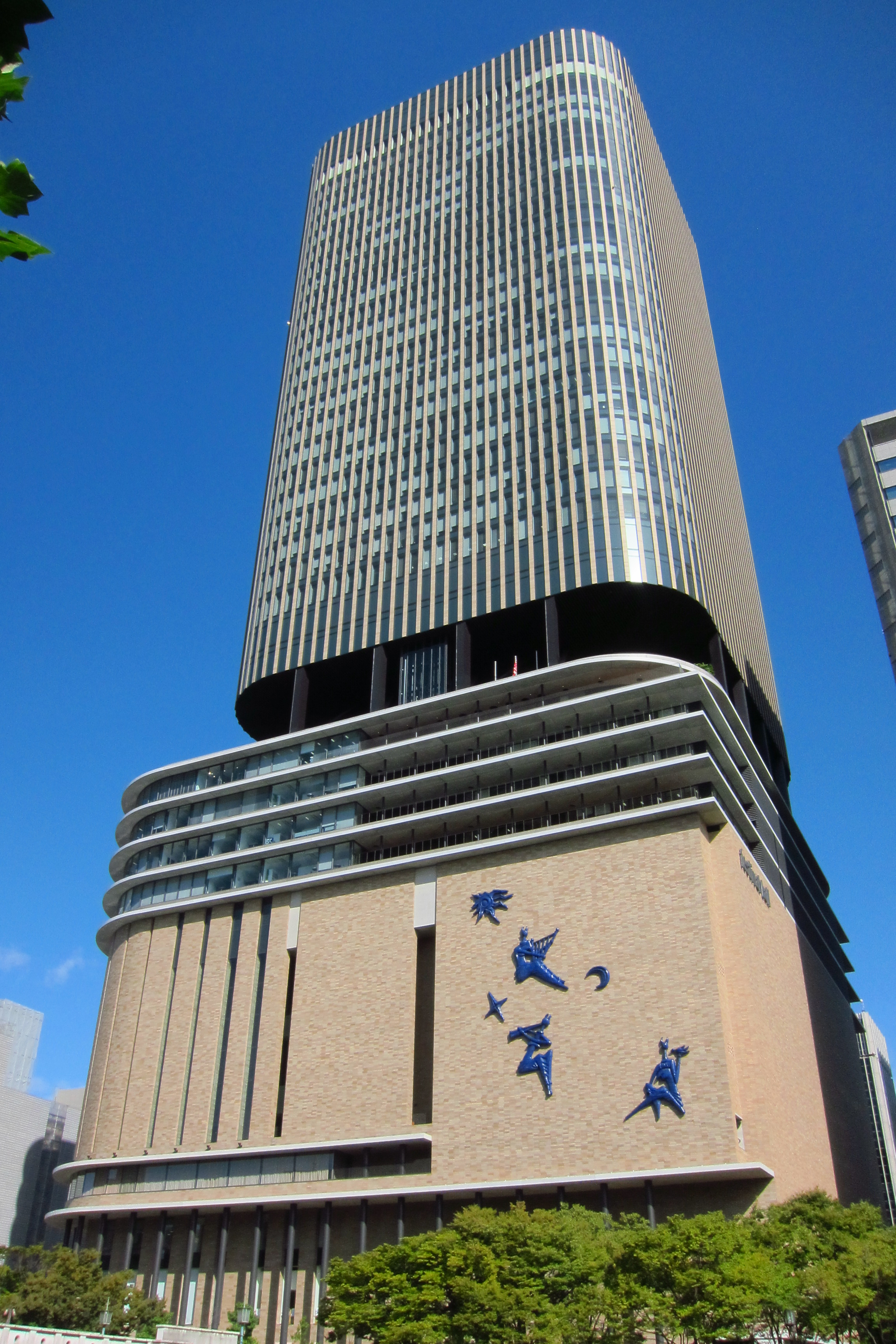
Building hosting the consulate-general in Osaka

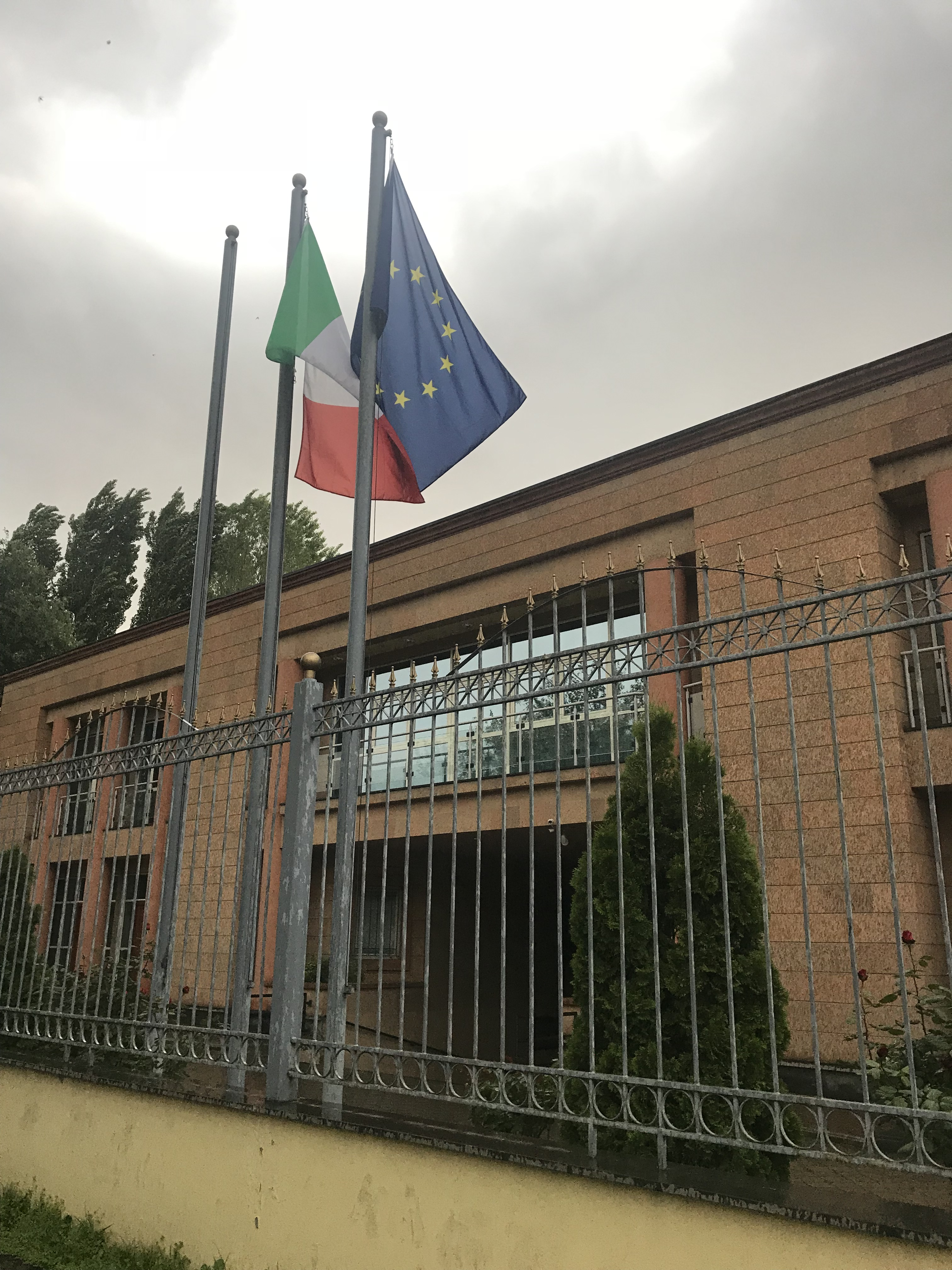
Embassy in Yerevan

=== Europe ===
Host country	Host city	Mission	Concurrent accreditation	Ref.
Austria	Vienna	Embassy		
Albania	Tirana	Embassy		
Albania	Vlorë	Consulate-General		
Belarus	Minsk	Embassy		
Belgium	Brussels	Embassy		
Belgium	Charleroi	Consulate-General		
Bosnia and Herzegovina	Sarajevo	Embassy		
Bulgaria	Sofia	Embassy		
Croatia	Zagreb	Embassy		
Croatia	Rijeka	Consulate-General		
Cyprus	Nicosia	Embassy		
Czech Republic	Prague	Embassy		
Denmark	Copenhagen	Embassy		
Estonia	Tallinn	Embassy		
Finland	Helsinki	Embassy		
France	Paris	Embassy		
France	Lyon	Consulate-General		
France	Marseille	Consulate-General		
France	Metz	Consulate-General		
France	Nice	Consulate-General		
Germany	Berlin	Embassy		
Germany	Cologne	Consulate-General		
Germany	Frankfurt	Consulate-General		
Germany	Hanover	Consulate-General		
Germany	Munich	Consulate-General		
Germany	Stuttgart	Consulate-General		
Germany	Dortmund	Consulate		
Germany	Freiburg im Breisgau	Consulate		
Germany	Wolfsburg	Consular agency		
Greece	Athens	Embassy		
Holy See	Rome	Embassy (Note: The Italian embassy to the Holy See is located outside Vatican territory in Rome.)	Sovereign entity: Sovereign Military Order of Malta	
Hungary	Budapest	Embassy		
Ireland	Dublin	Embassy		
Kosovo	Pristina	Embassy		
Latvia	Riga	Embassy		
Lithuania	Vilnius	Embassy		
Luxembourg	Luxembourg City	Embassy		
Malta	Valletta	Embassy		
Moldova	Chişinău	Embassy		
Monaco	Monaco	Embassy		
Montenegro	Podgorica	Embassy		
Netherlands	The Hague	Embassy	International Organizations: OPCW	
North Cyprus	North Nicosia	Visa office (Note: Italy doesn't recognize Northern Cyprus, but has a visa office in North Nicosia.)		
North Macedonia	Skopje	Embassy		
Norway	Oslo	Embassy	Countries: Iceland	
Poland	Warsaw	Embassy		
Portugal	Lisbon	Embassy		
Romania	Bucharest	Embassy		
Russia	Moscow	Embassy		
Russia	Saint Petersburg	Consulate-General (Note: To be closed in 2023.)		
San Marino	City of San Marino	Embassy		
Serbia	Belgrade	Embassy		
Slovakia	Bratislava	Embassy		
Slovenia	Ljubljana	Embassy		
Slovenia	Koper	Consulate-General		
Spain	Madrid	Embassy	Countries: Andorra	
Spain	Barcelona	Consulate-General	Countries: Andorra	
Spain	Arona	Vice-consulate	Countries: Andorra	
Sweden	Stockholm	Embassy		
Switzerland	Bern	Embassy	Countries: Liechtenstein	
Switzerland	Geneva	Consulate-General	Countries: Liechtenstein	
Switzerland	Lugano	Consulate-General	Countries: Liechtenstein	
Switzerland	Zürich	Consulate-General	Countries: Liechtenstein	
Switzerland	Basel	Consulate	Countries: Liechtenstein	
Ukraine	Kyiv	Embassy		
United Kingdom	London	Embassy	International Organizations: International Maritime Organization	
United Kingdom	Edinburgh	Consulate-General	International Organizations: International Maritime Organization	
United Kingdom	Manchester	Consulate	International Organizations: International Maritime Organization	

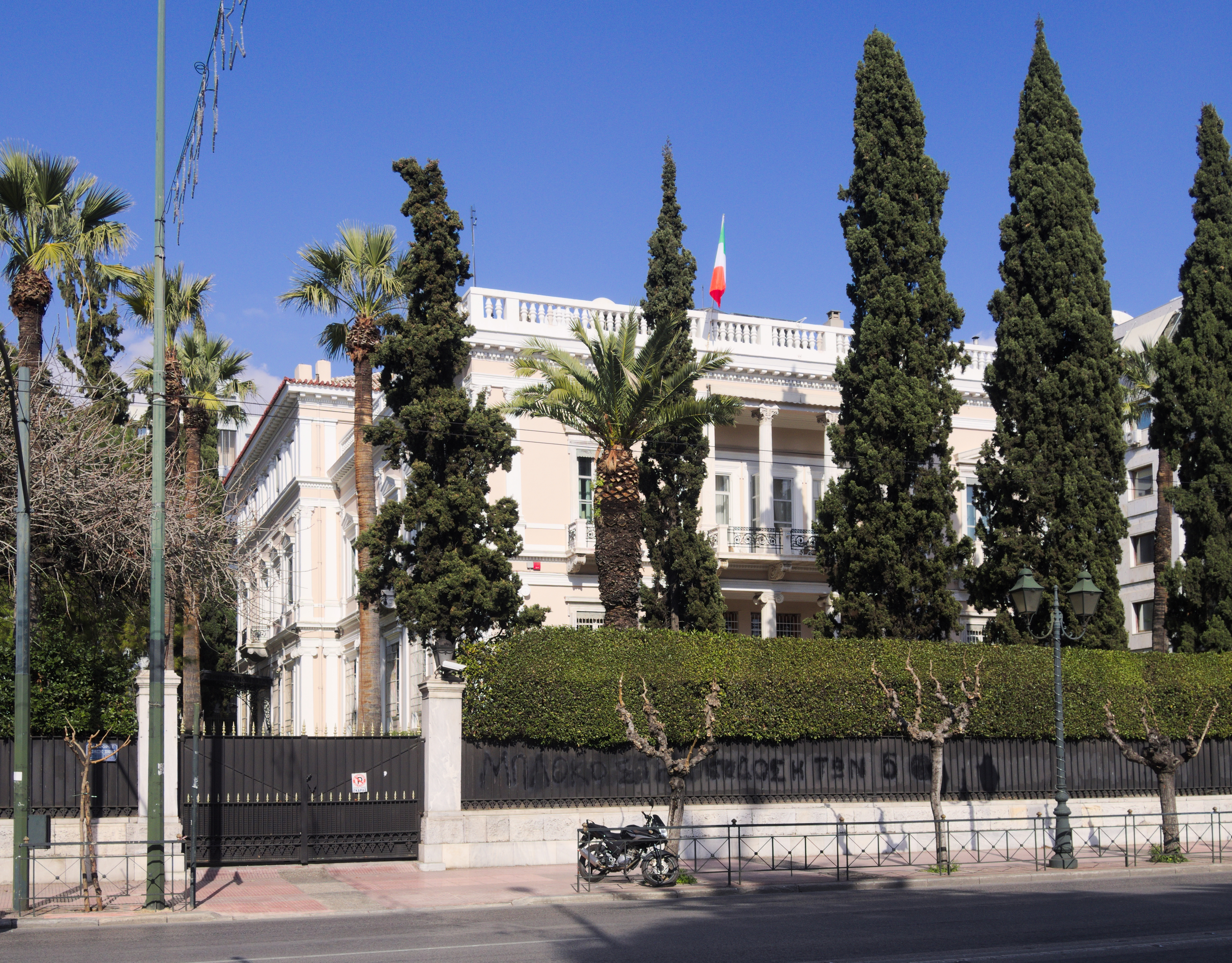
Embassy in Athens

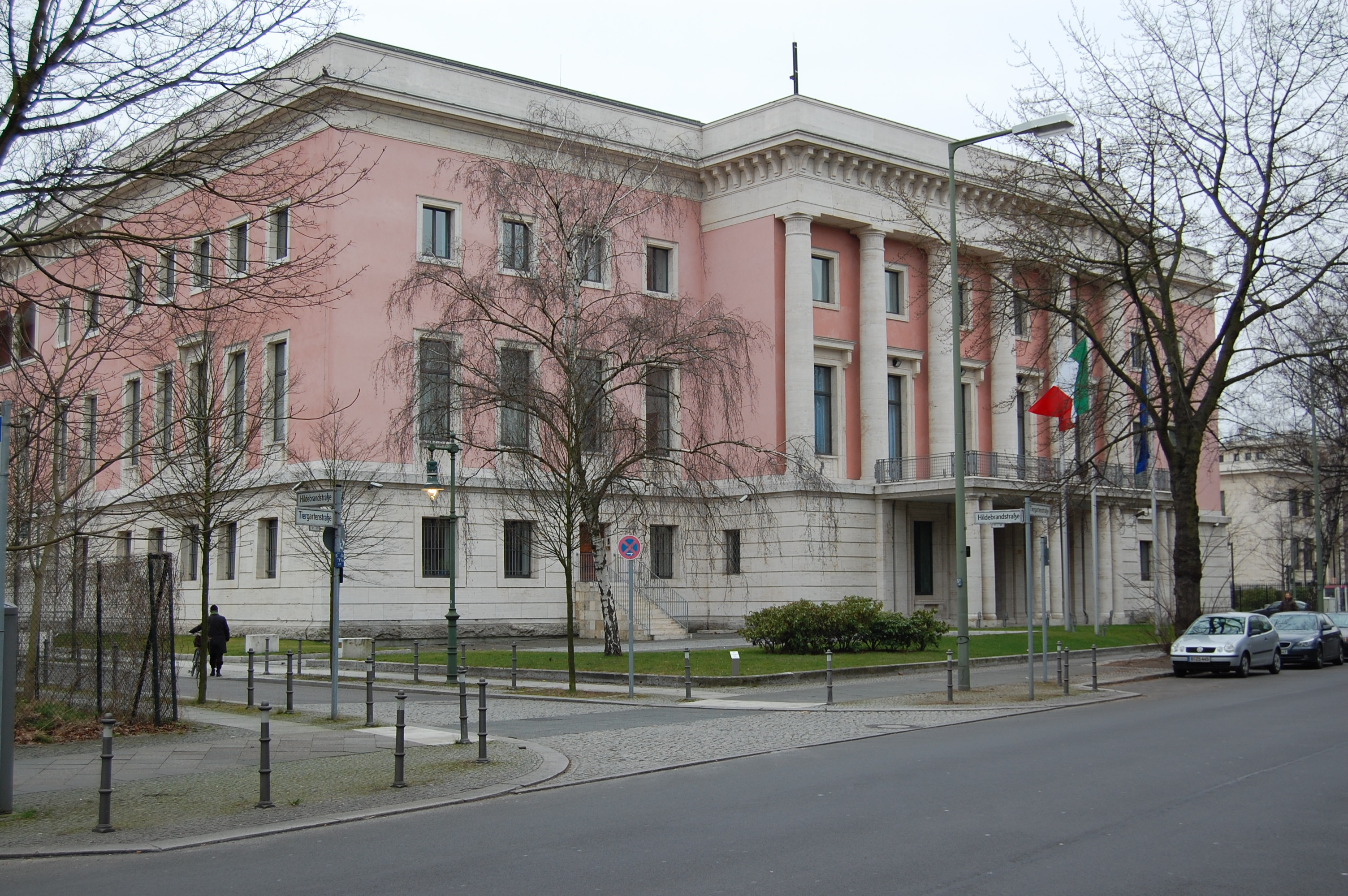
Embassy in Berlin

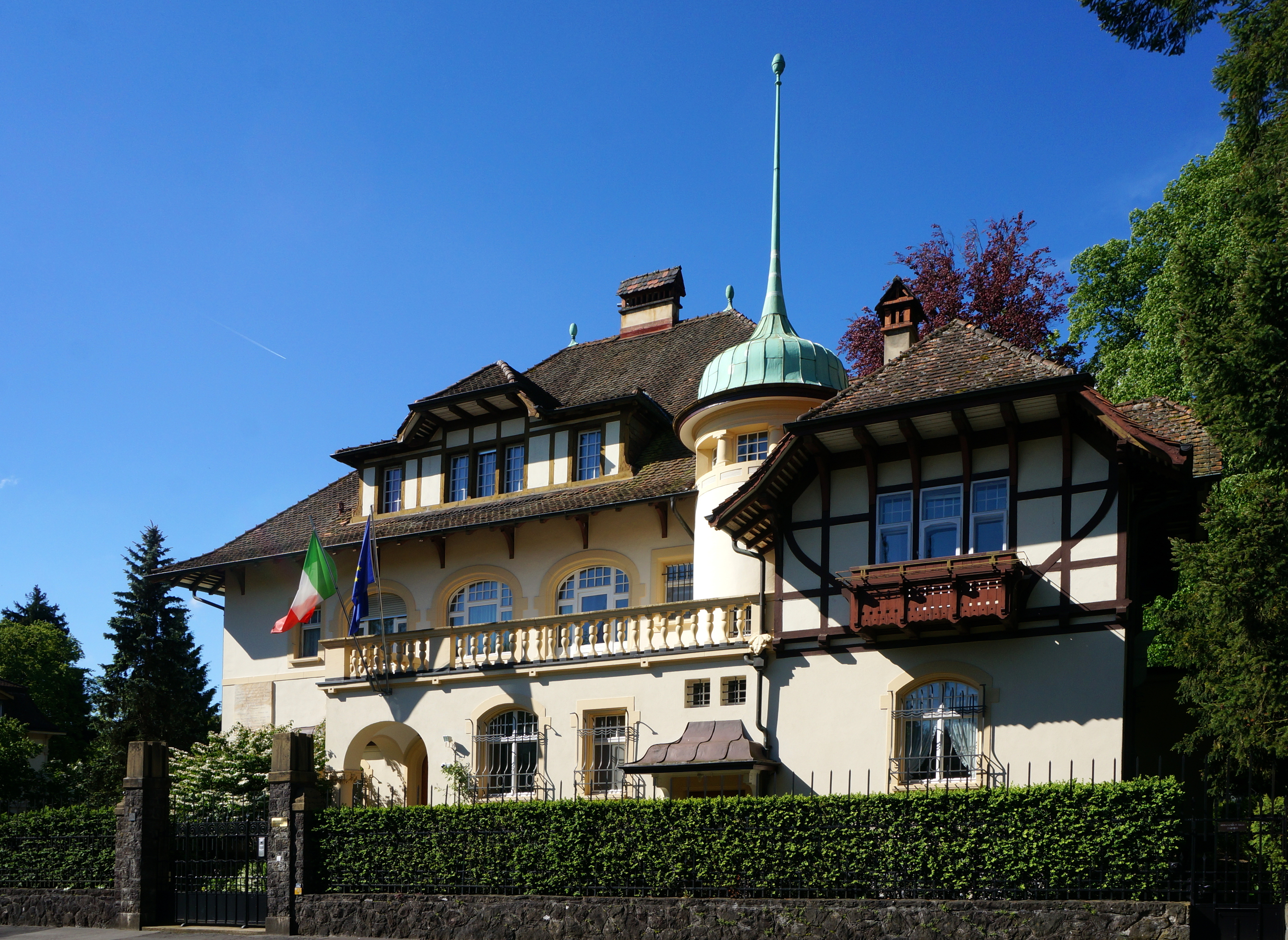
Embassy in Bern

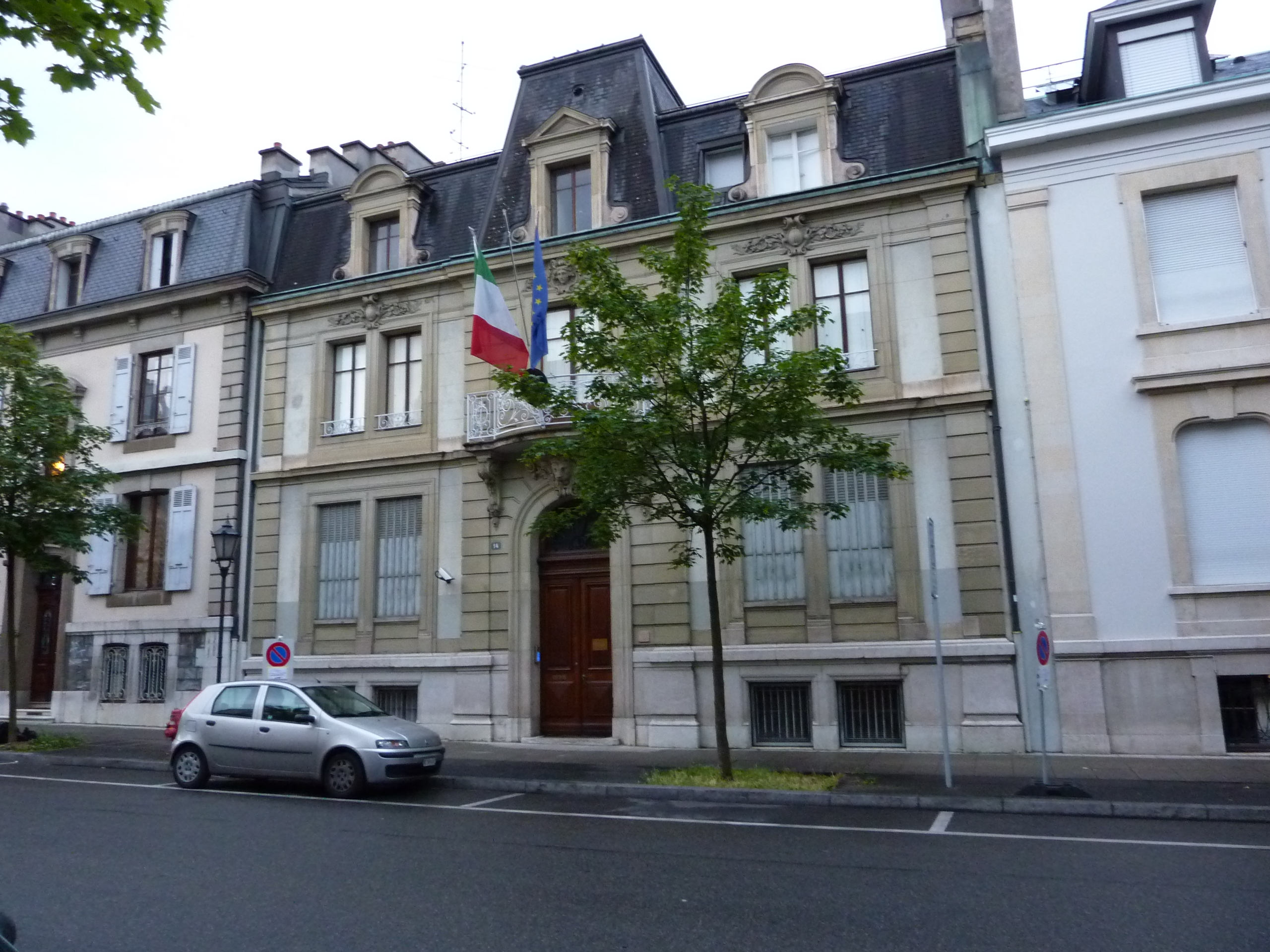
Consulate-General in Geneva

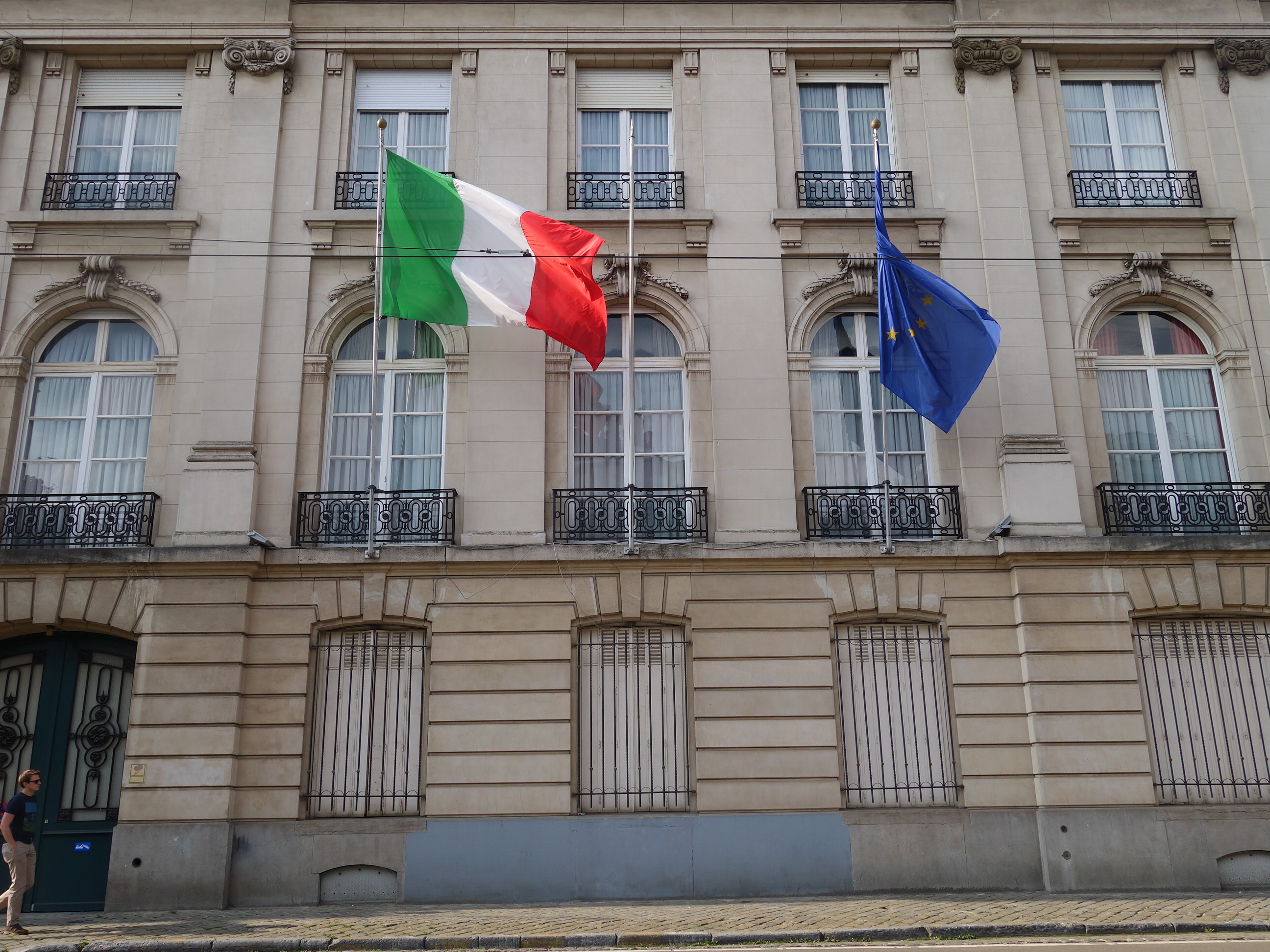
Embassy in Brussels

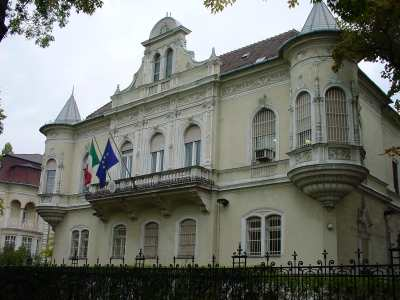
Embassy in Budapest

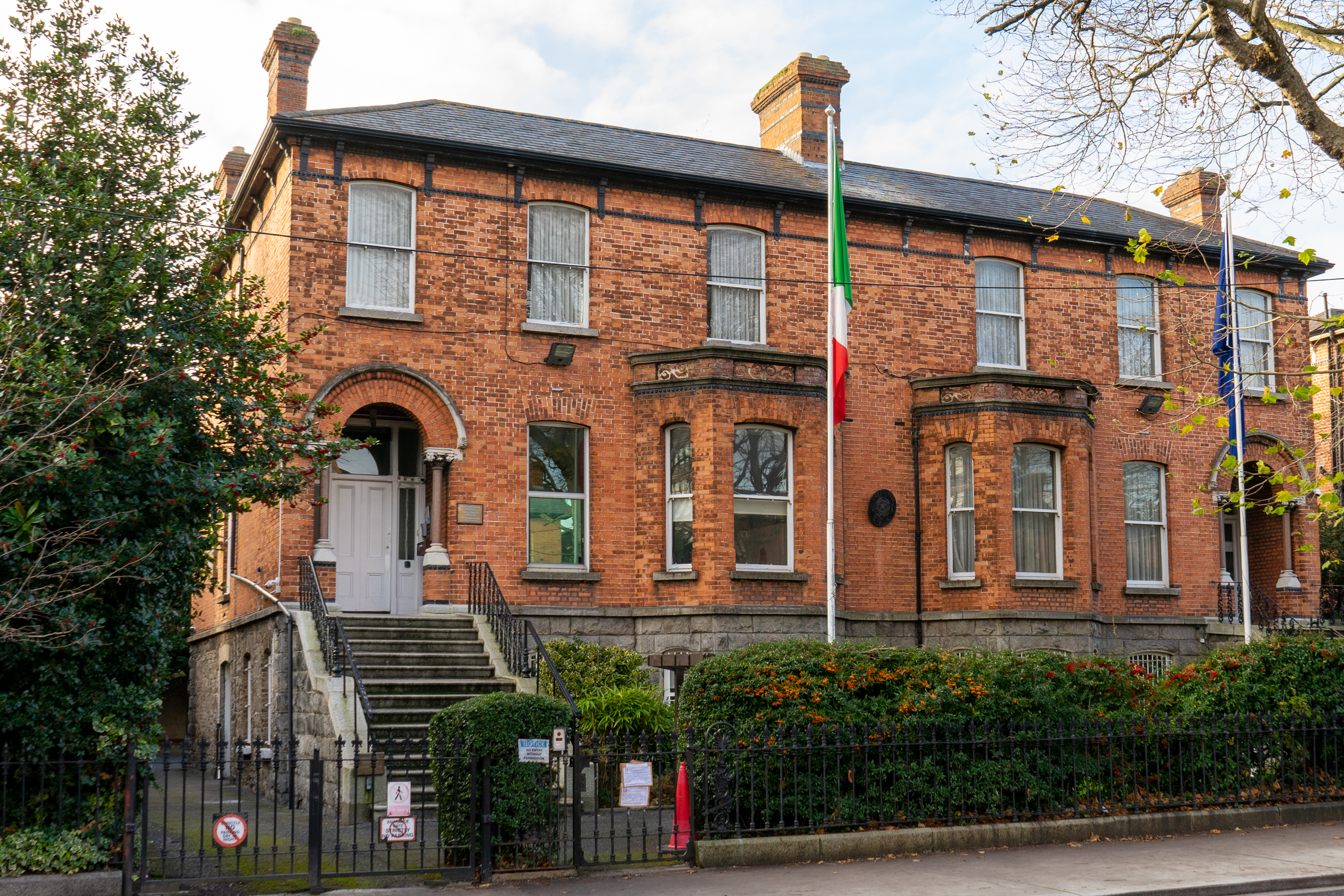
Embassy in Dublin

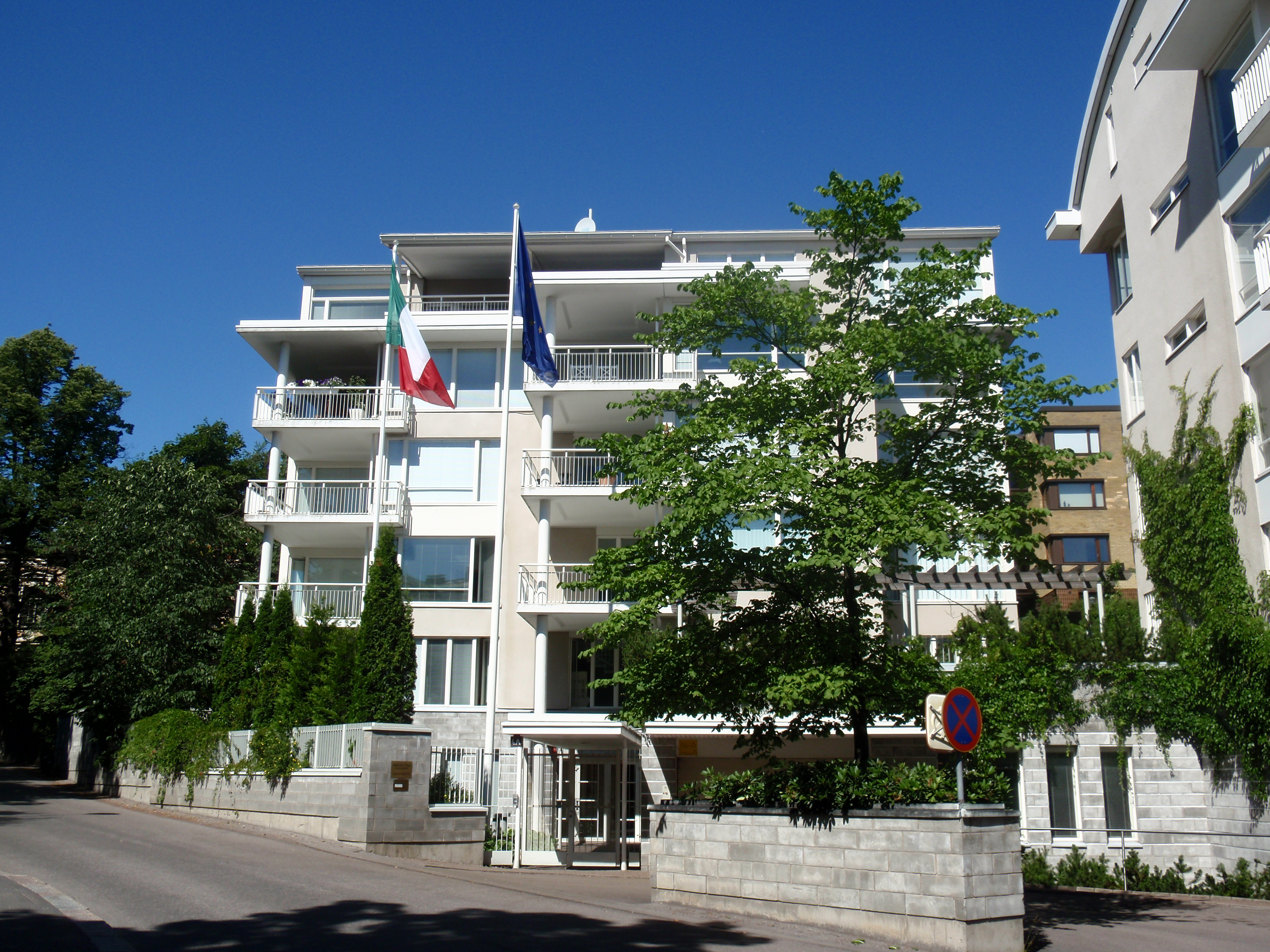
Embassy in Helsinki

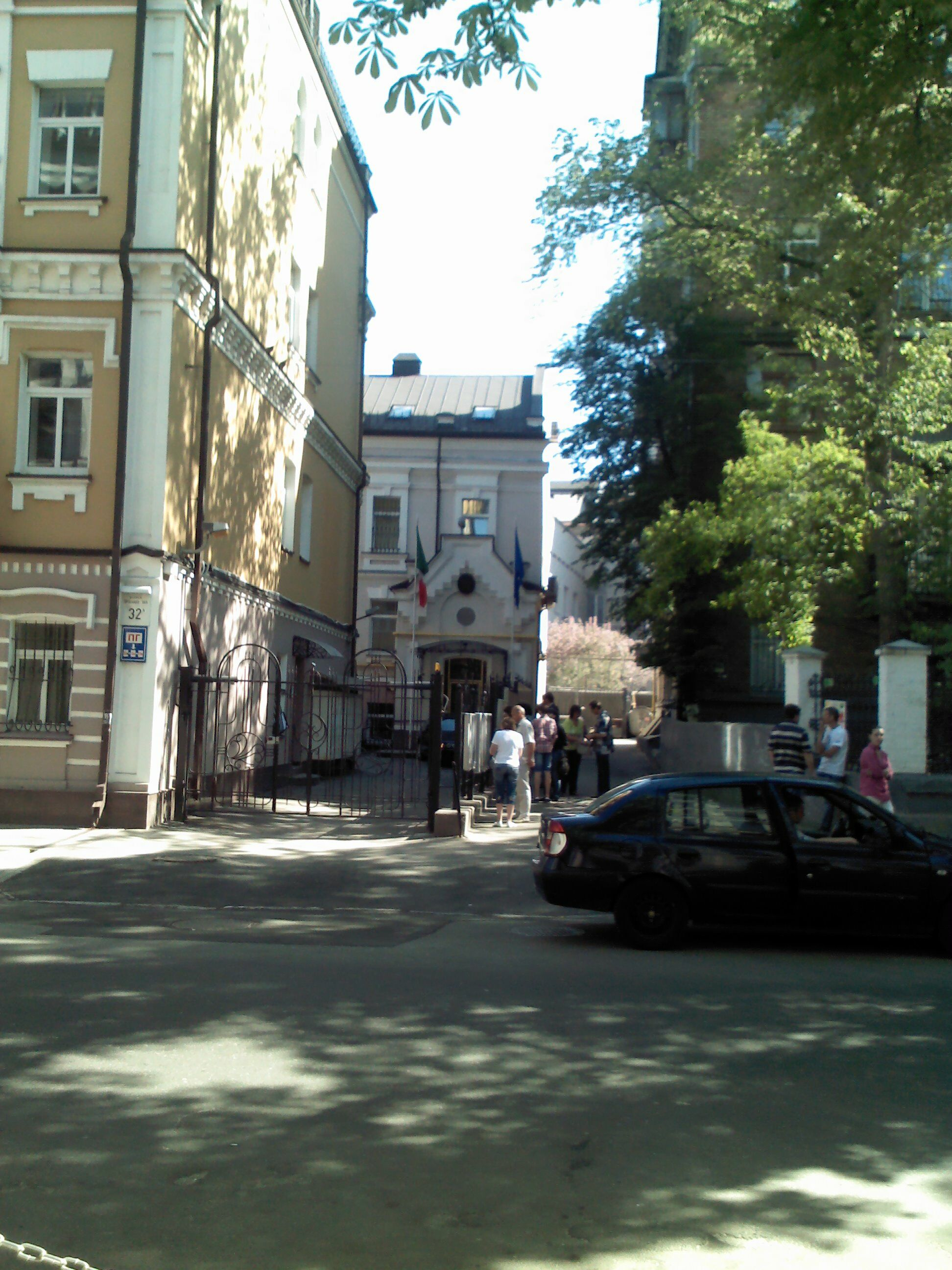
Embassy in Kyiv

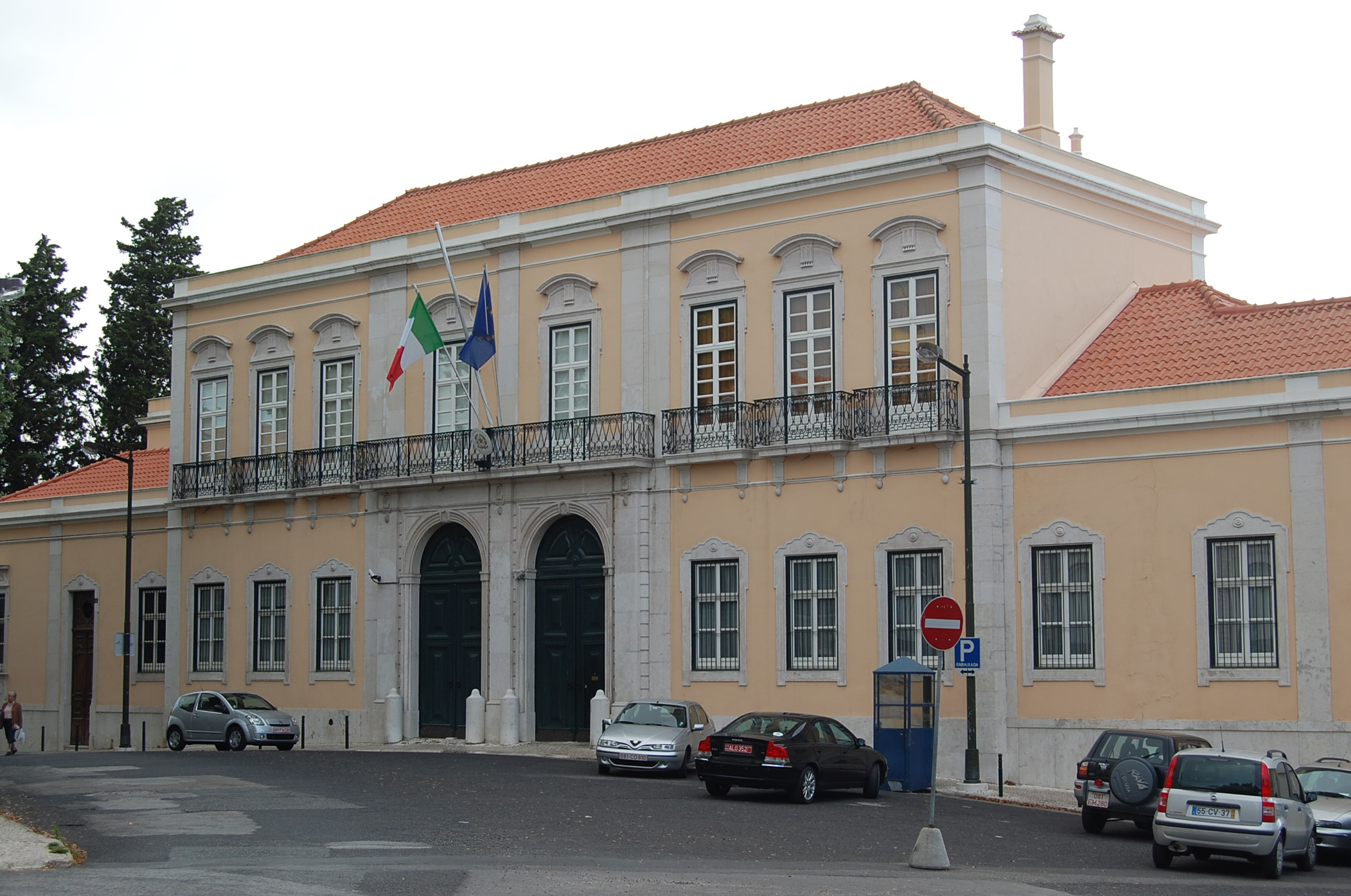
Embassy in Lisbon

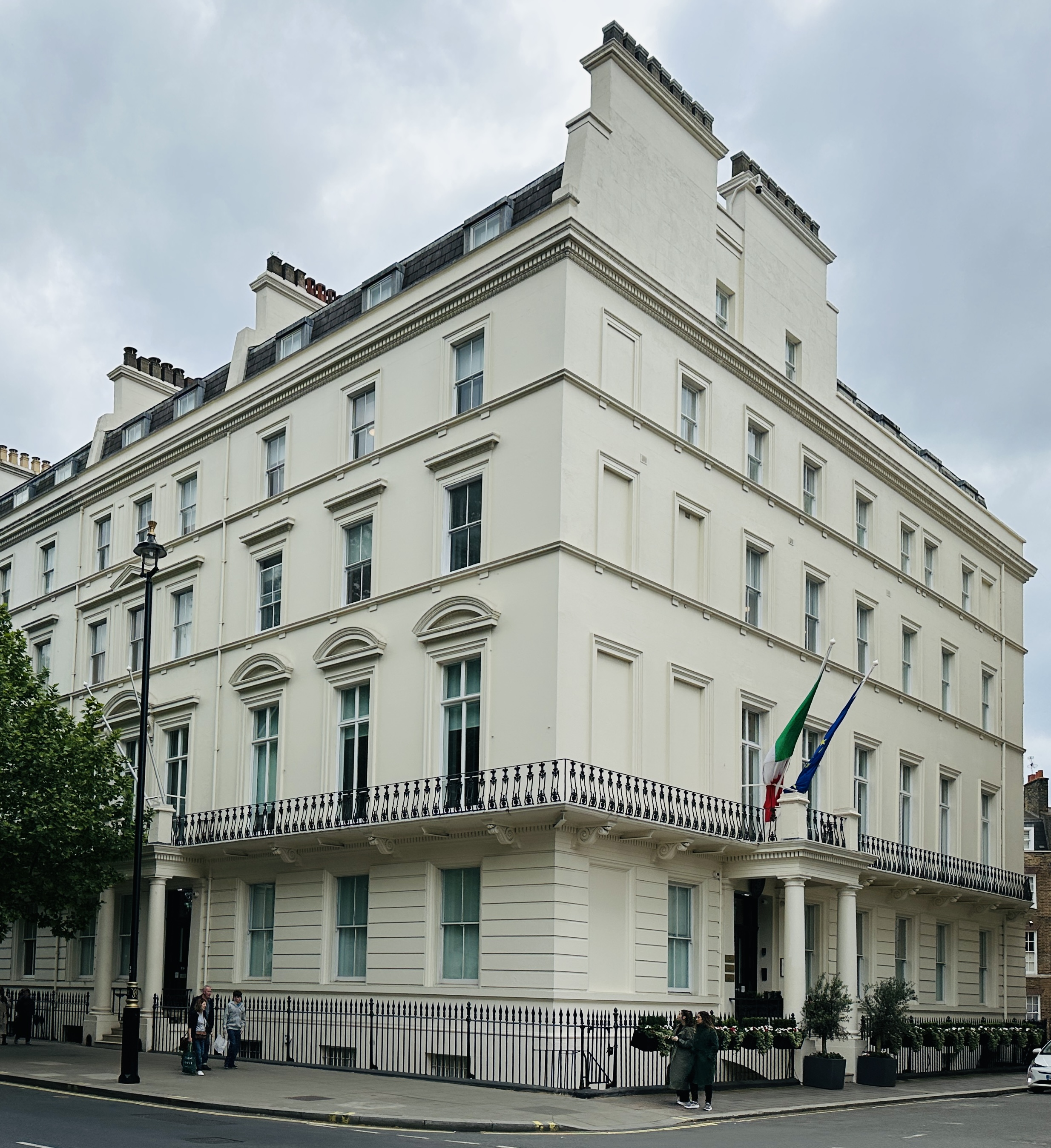
Embassy in London

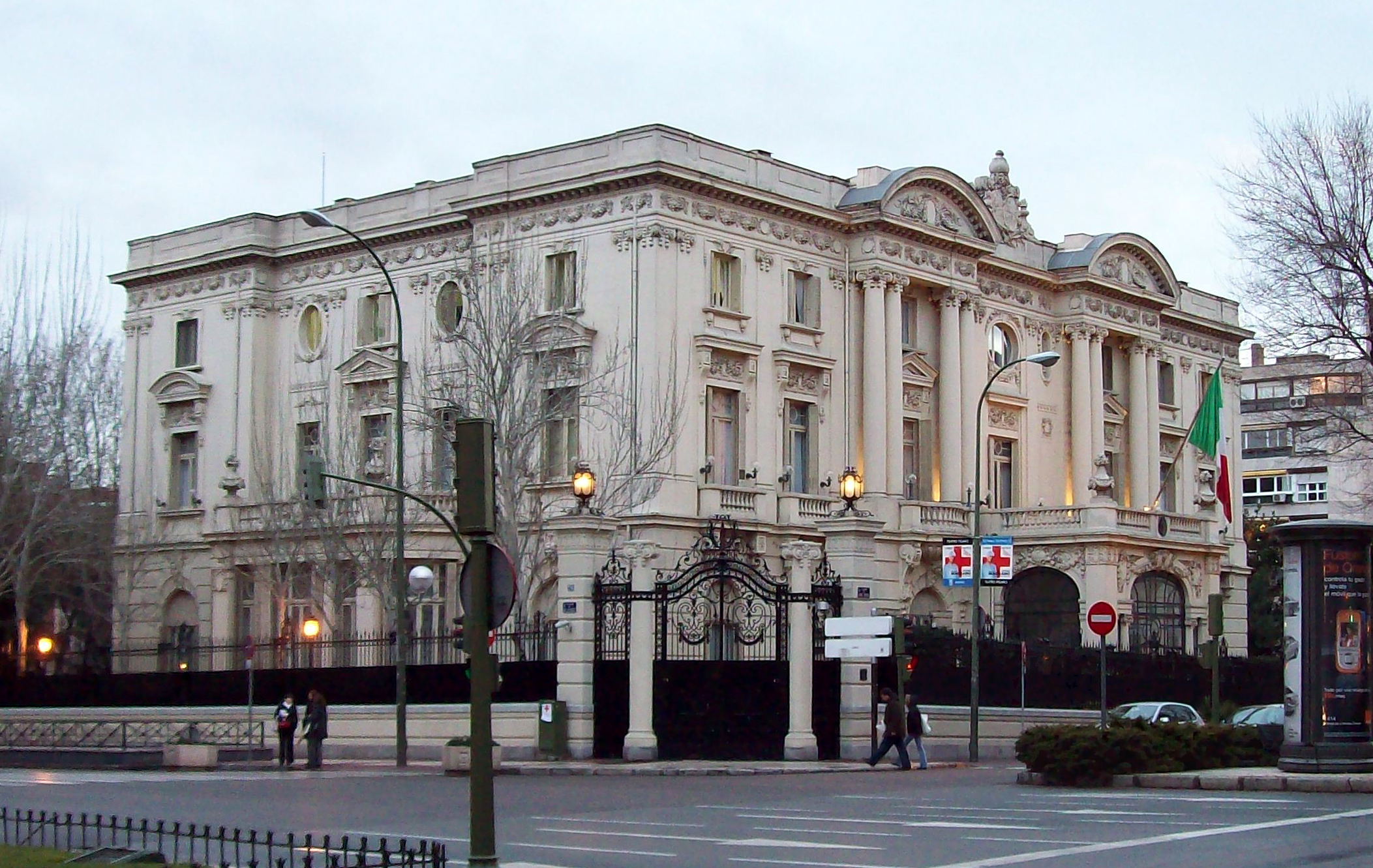
Embassy in Madrid

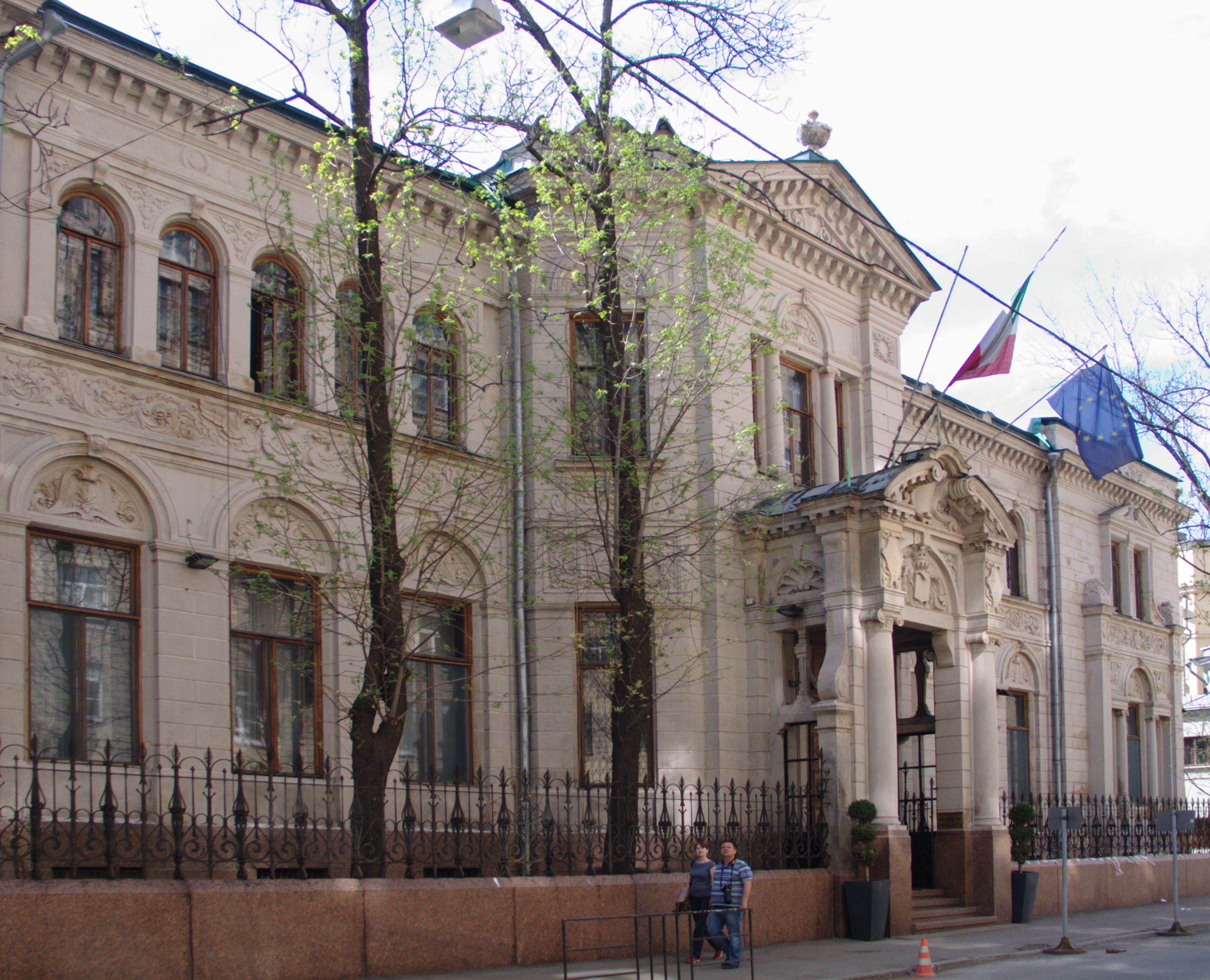
Embassy in Moscow

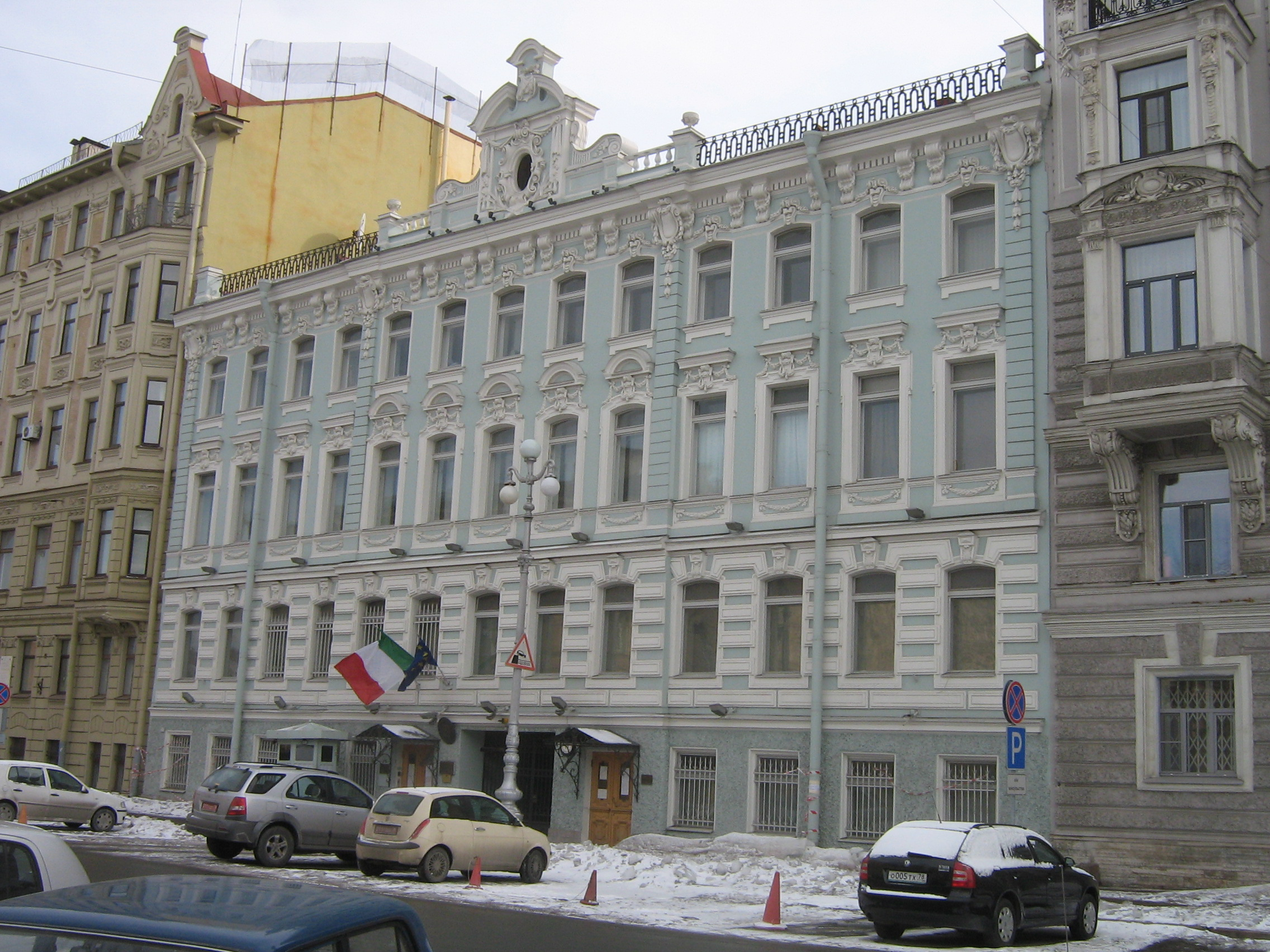
Consulate-General in Saint Petersburg

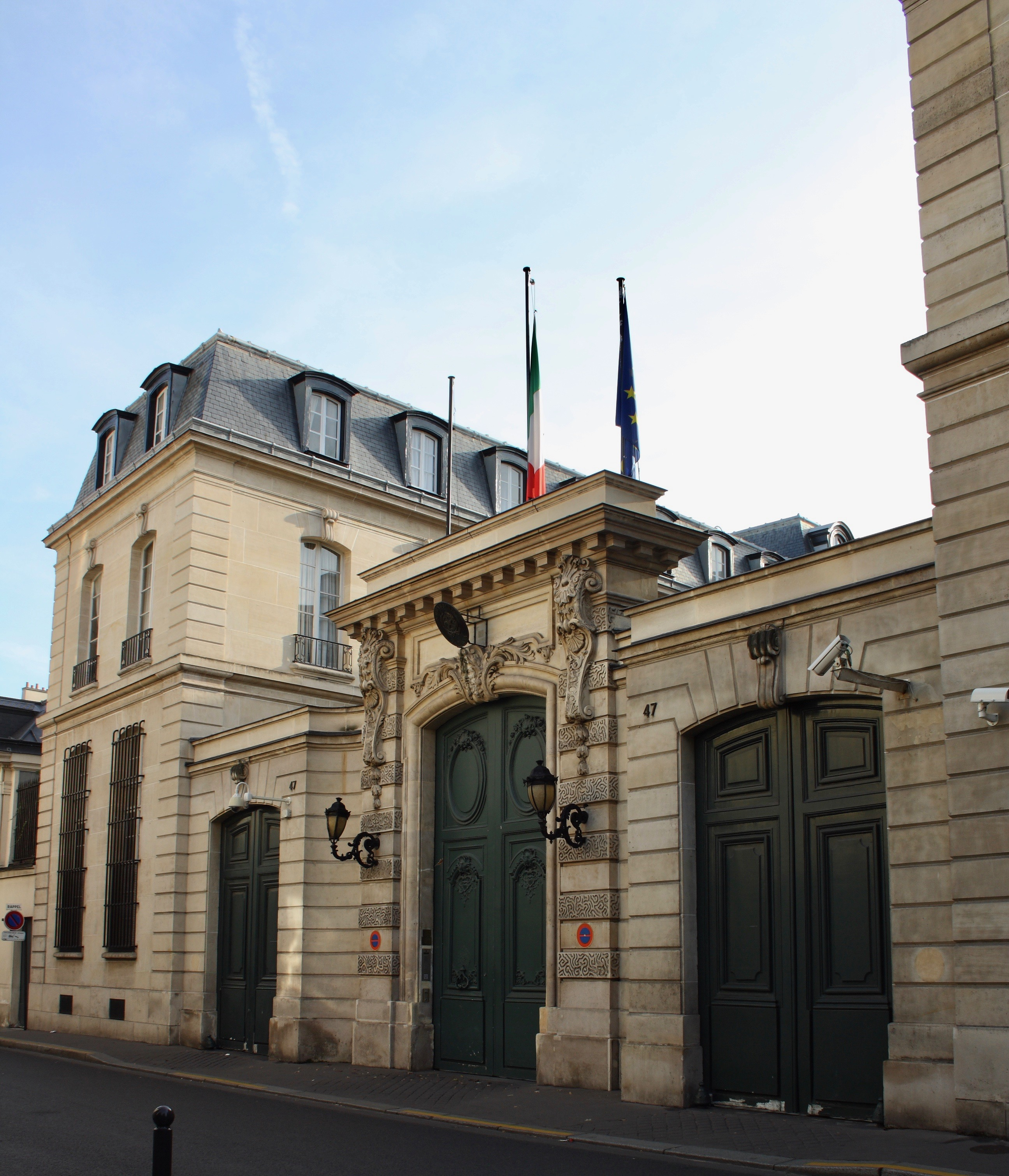
Embassy in Paris

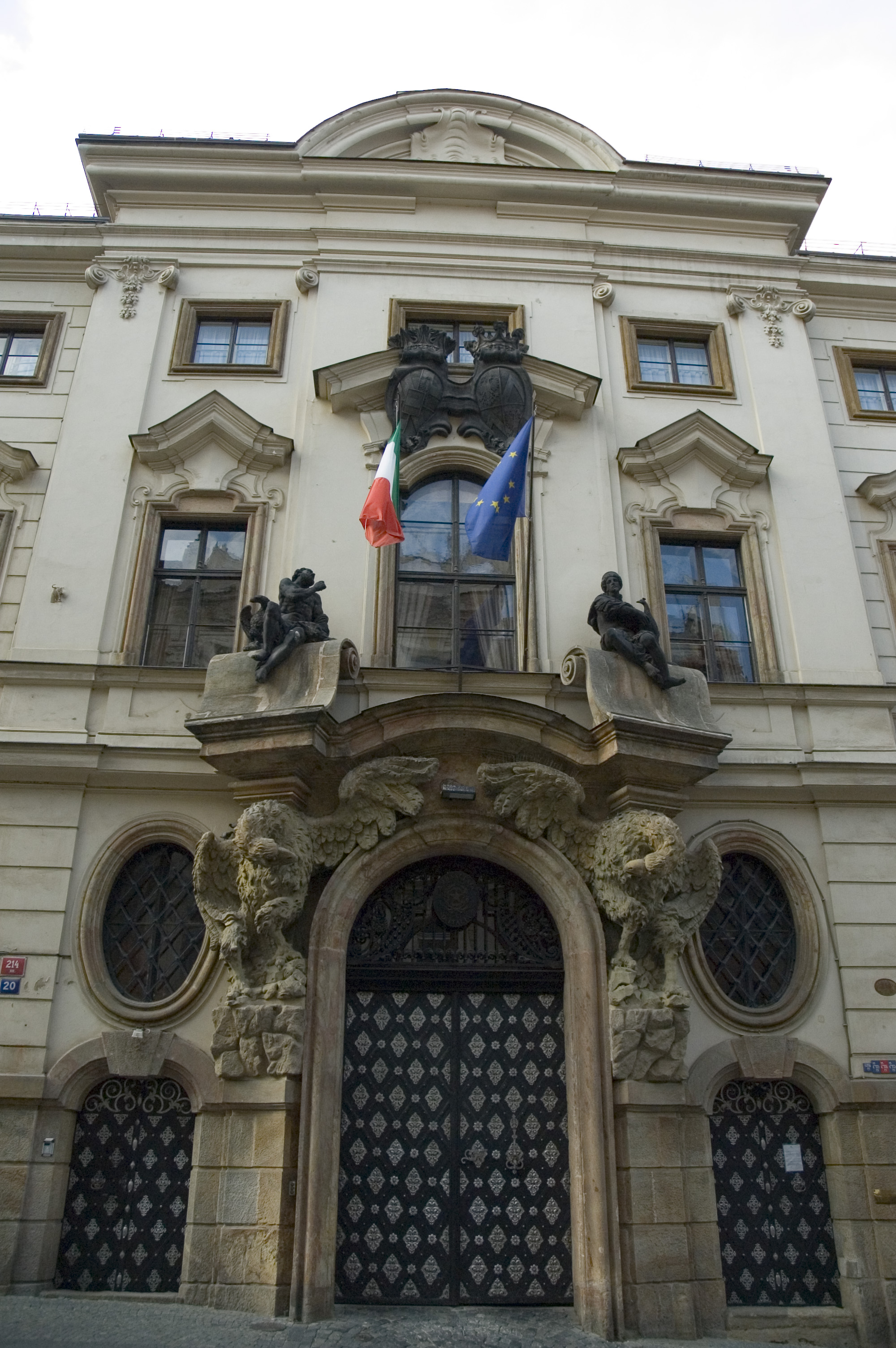
Embassy in Prague

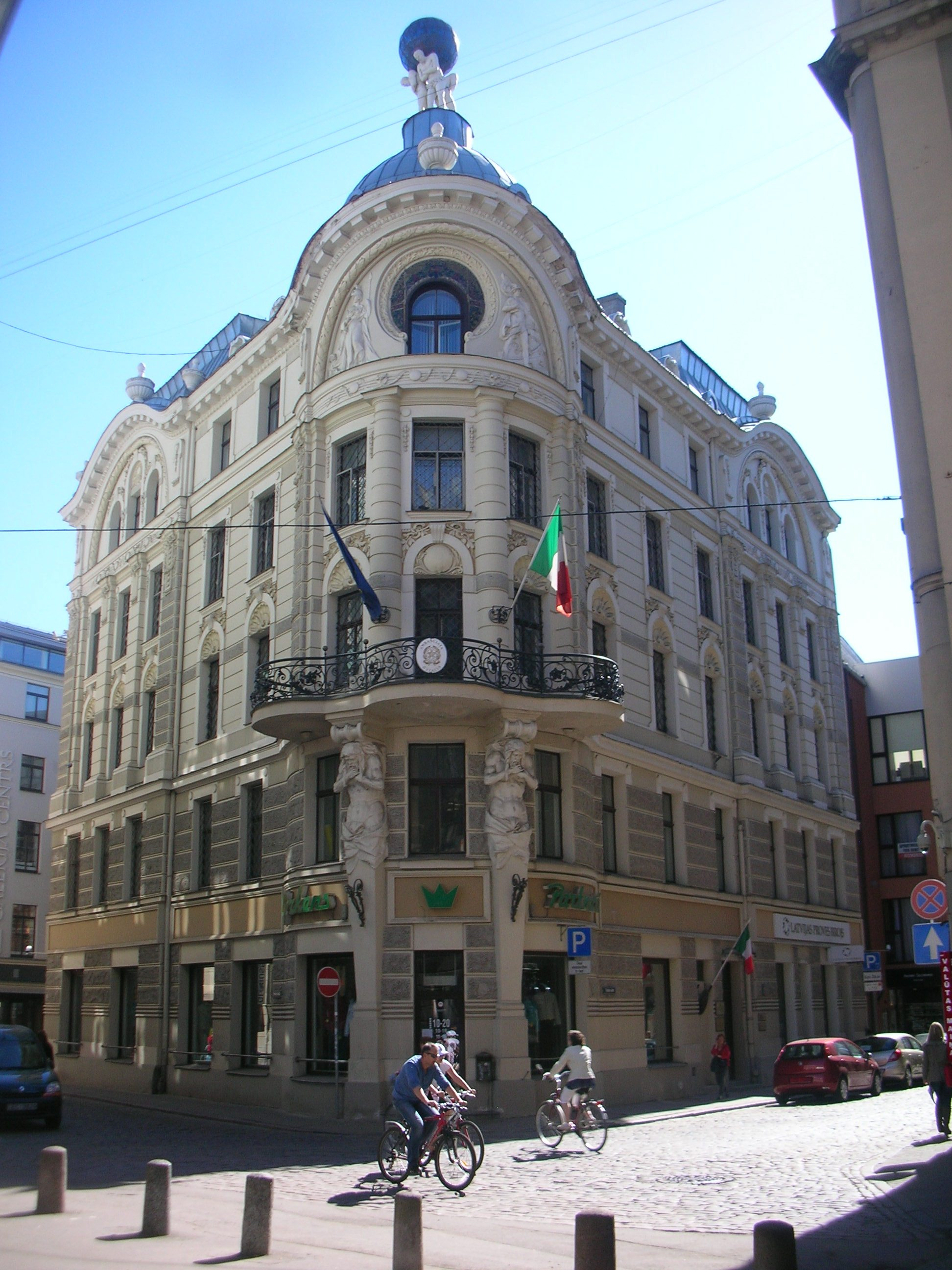
Embassy in Riga

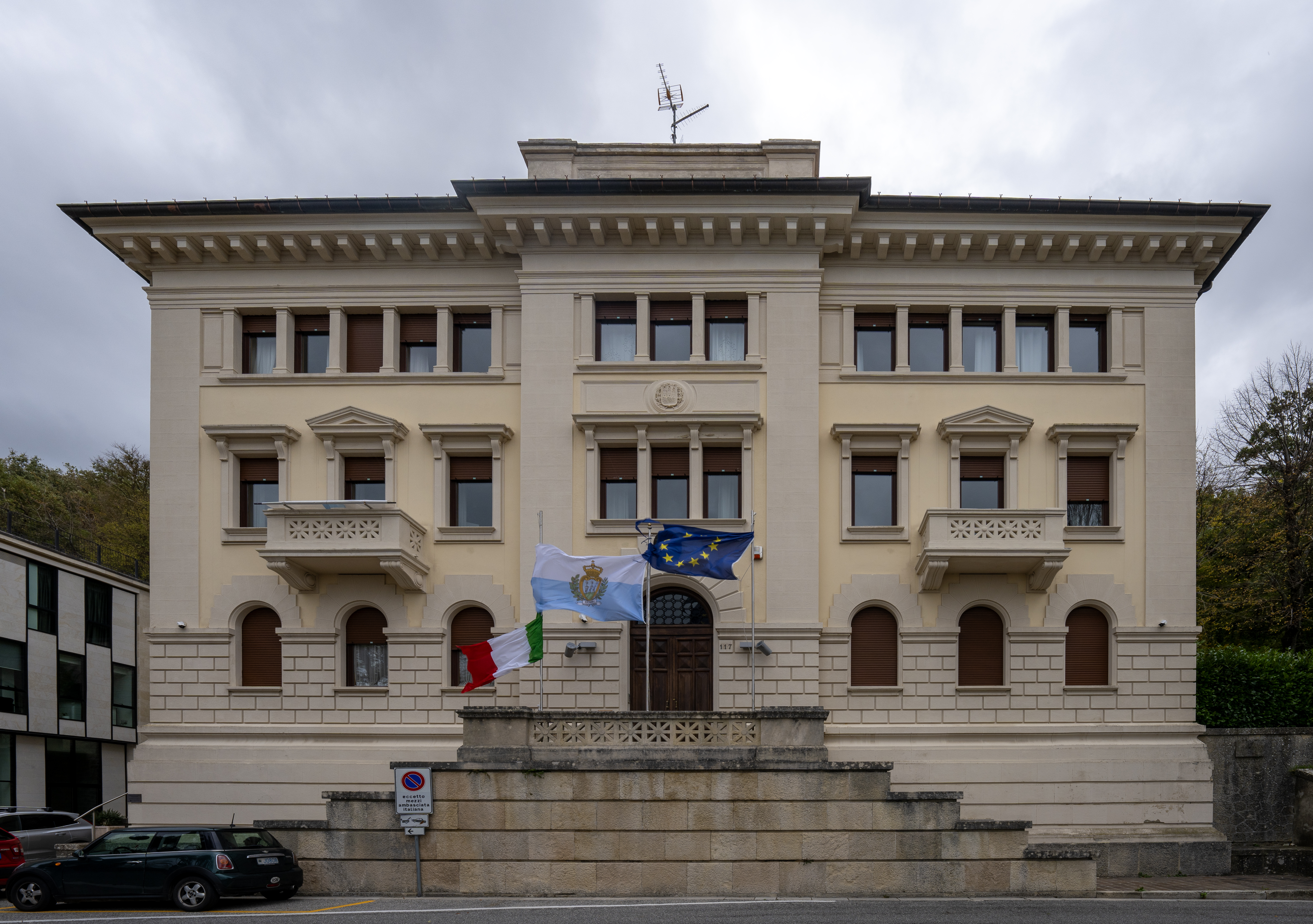
Embassy in San Marino

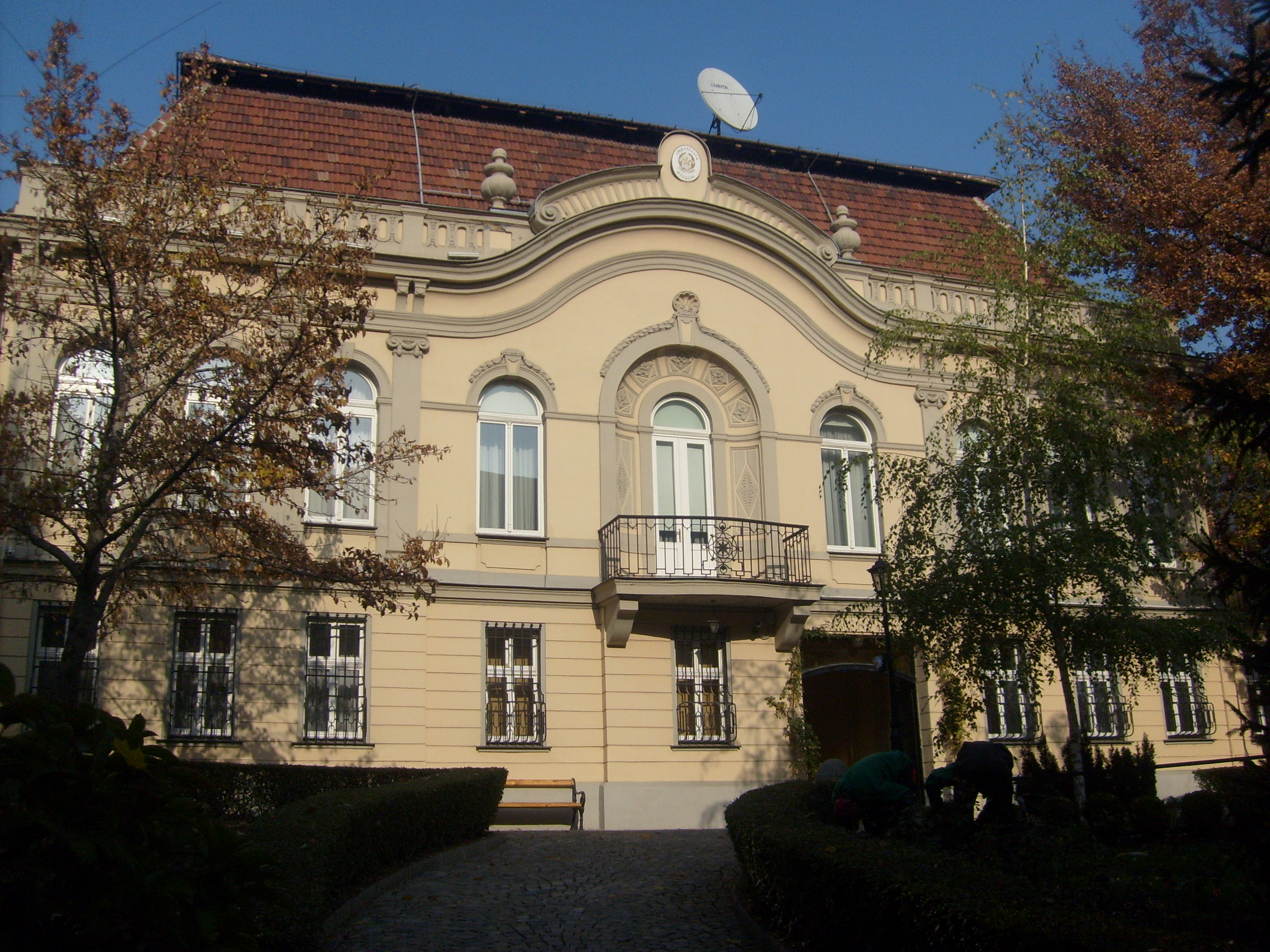
Embassy in Sofia

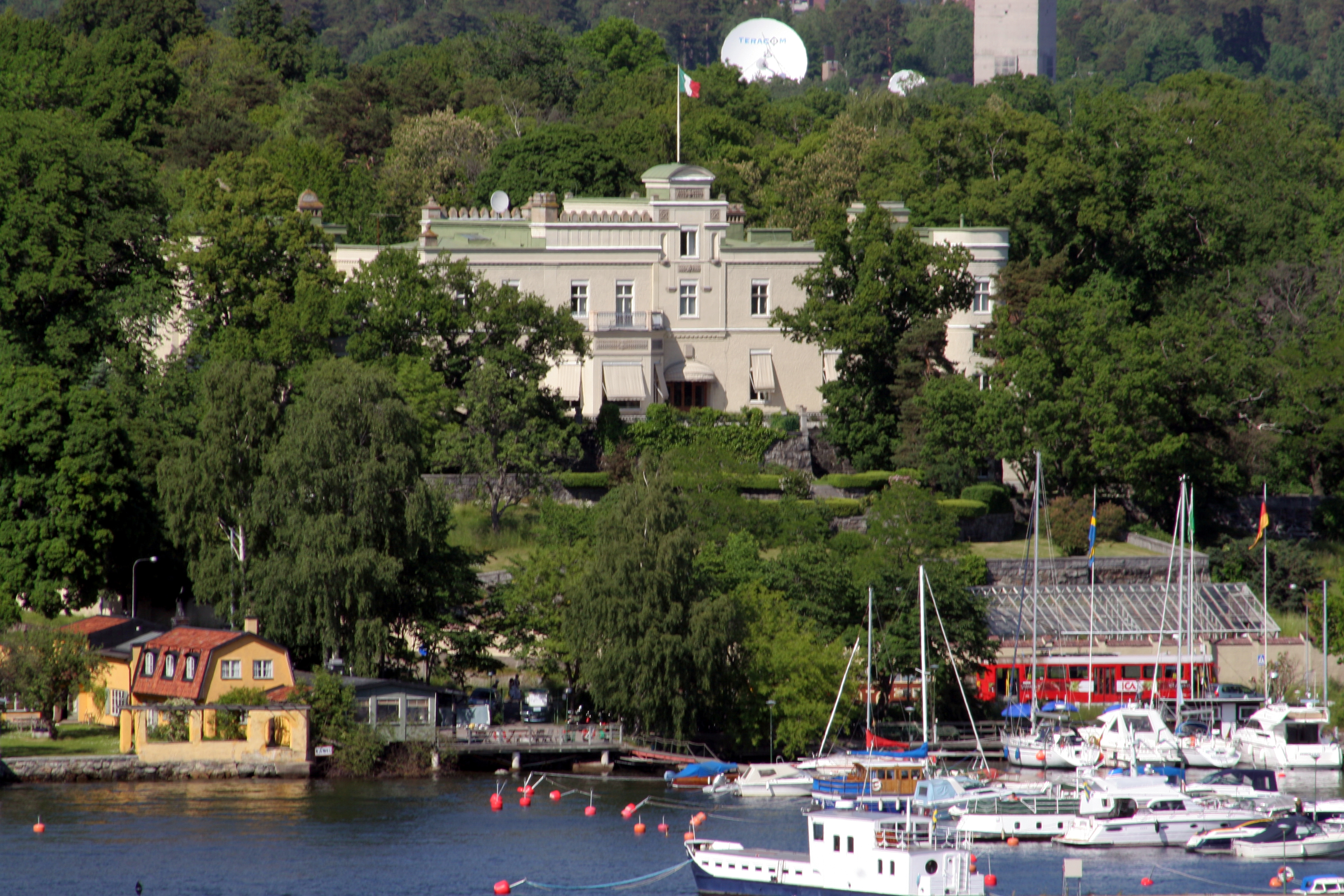
Embassy in Stockholm

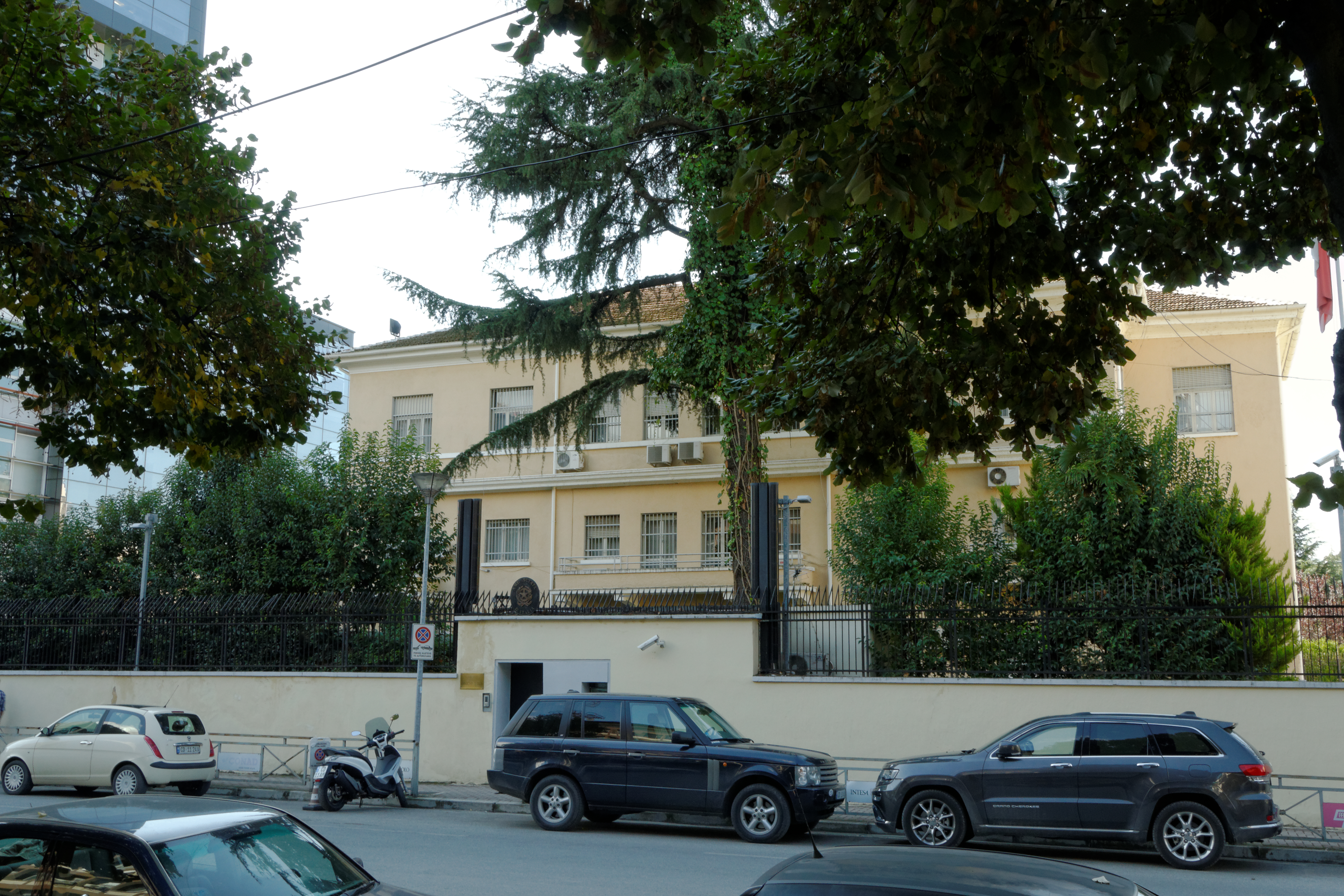
Embassy in Tirana

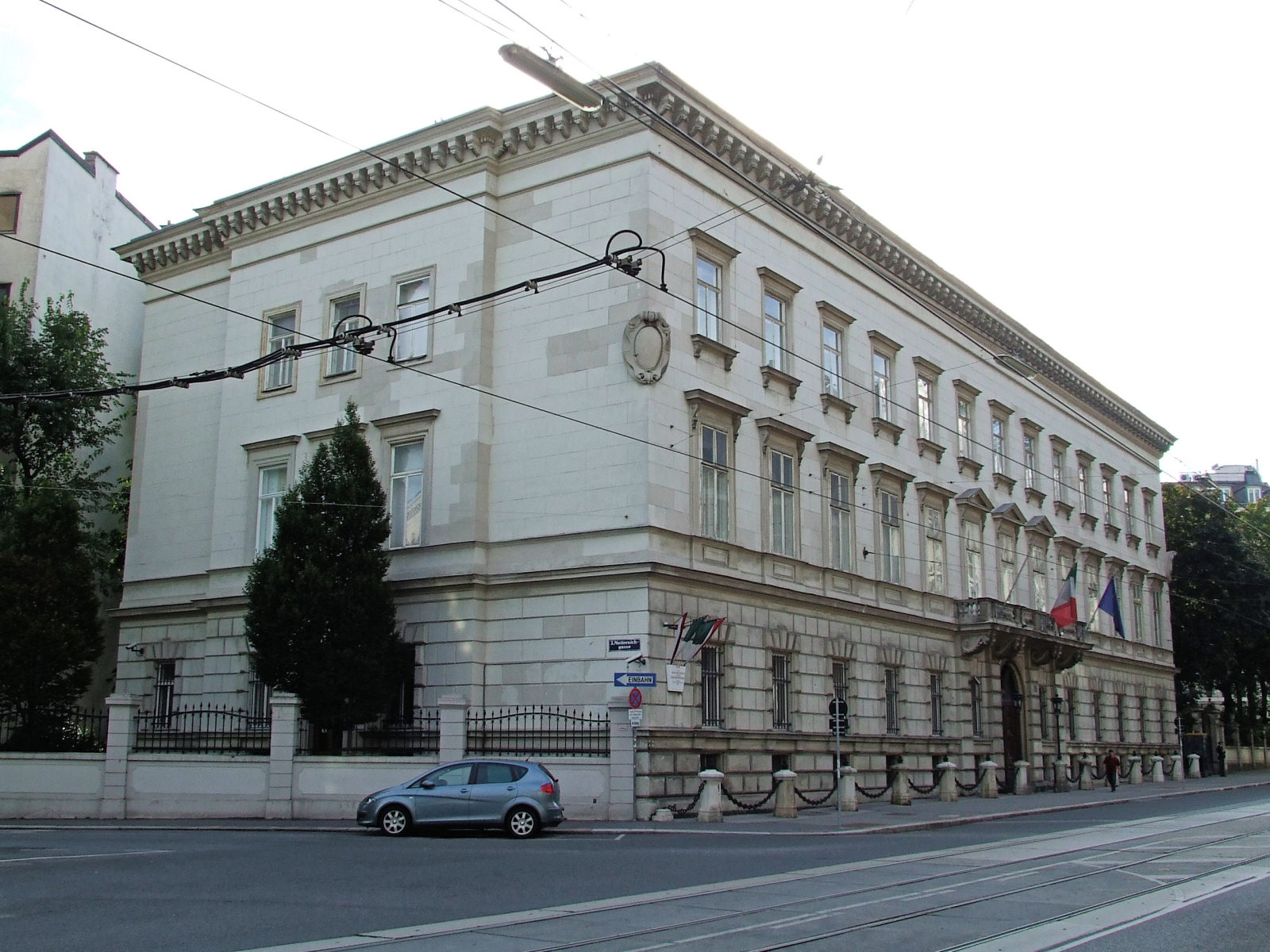
Embassy in Vienna

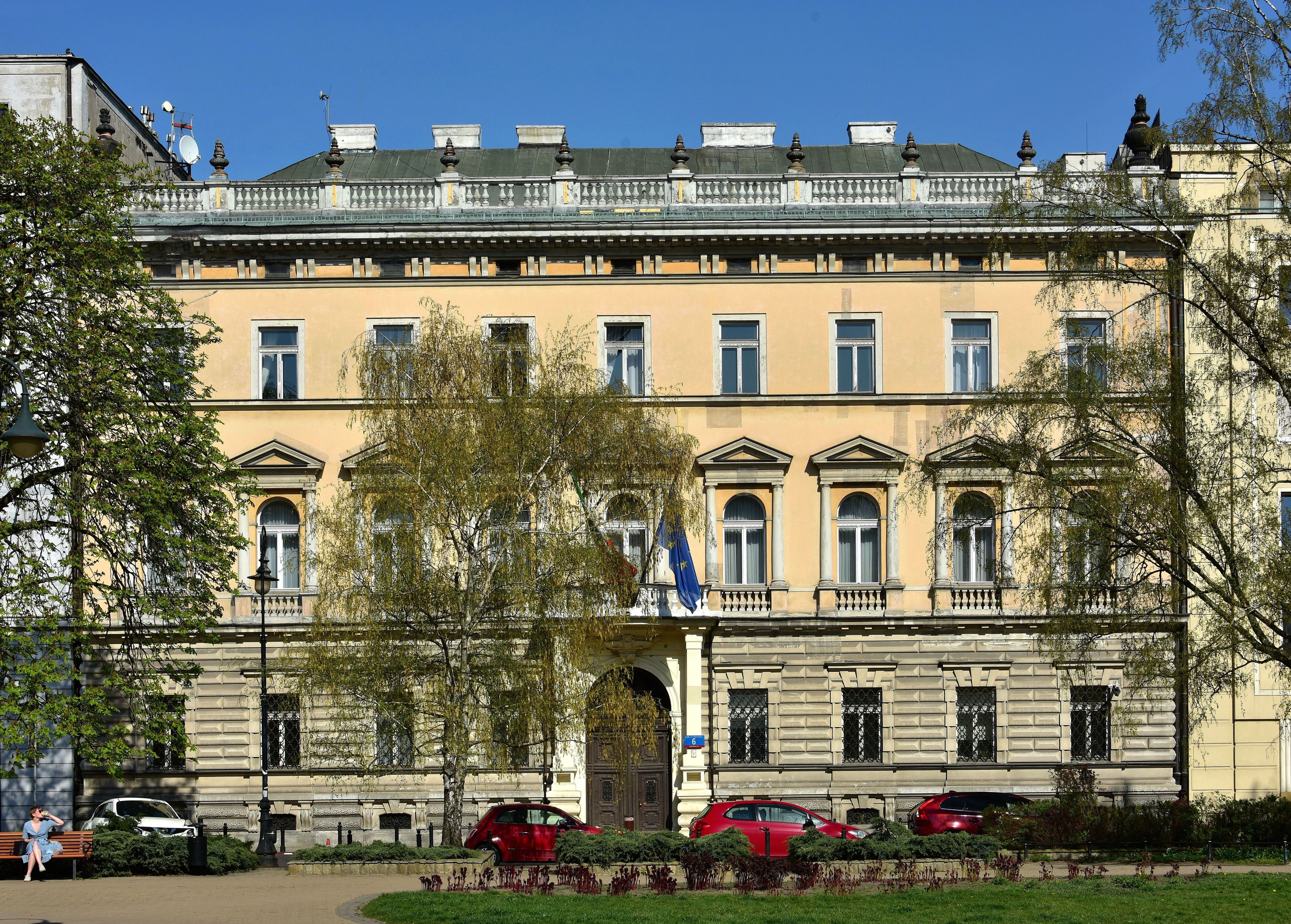
Embassy in Warsaw

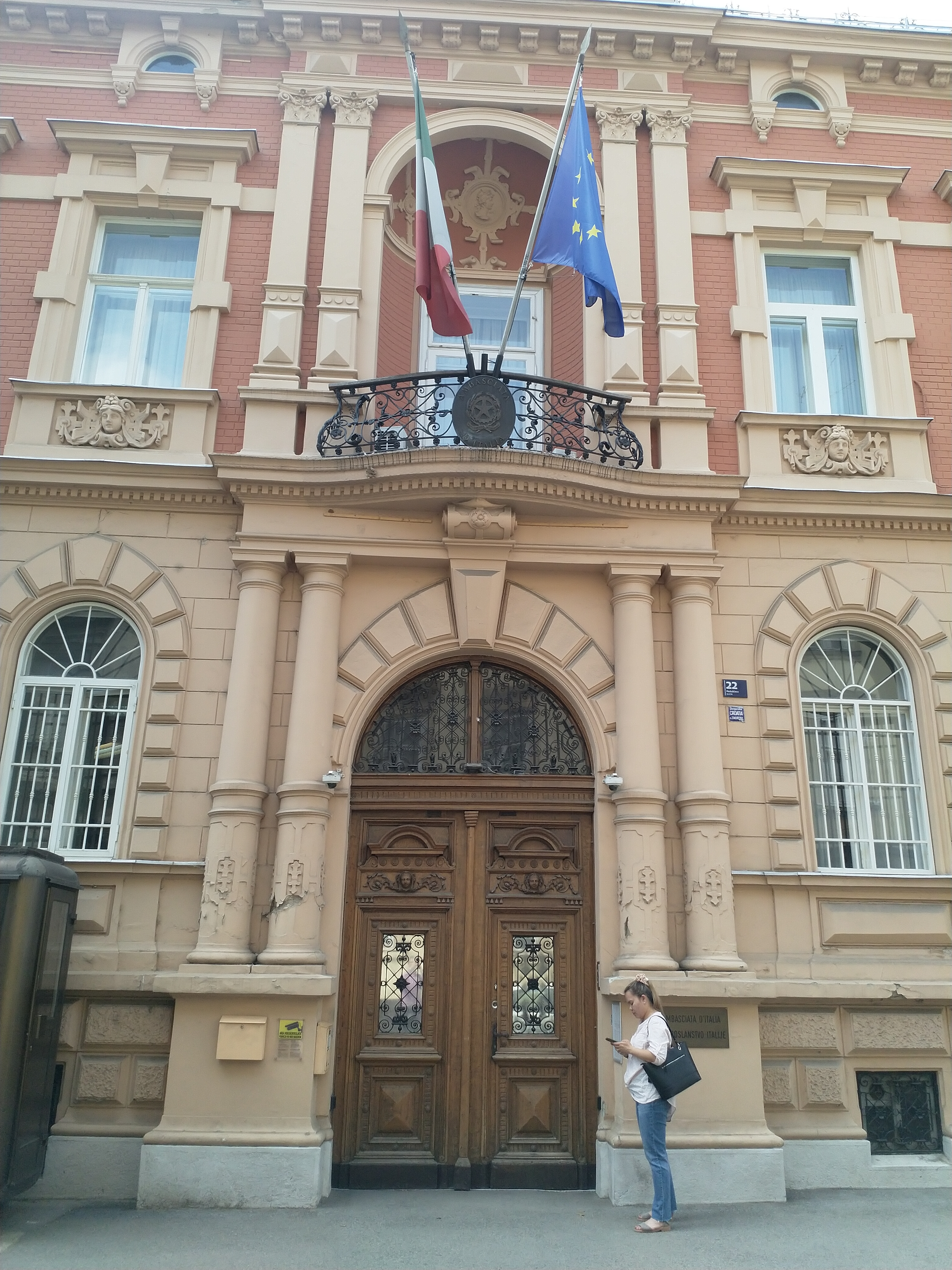
Embassy in Zagreb

=== Oceania ===
Host country	Host city	Mission	Concurrent accreditation	Ref.
Australia	Canberra	Embassy	Countries: Fiji; Nauru; Papua New Guinea; Solomon Islands; Vanuatu	
Australia	Melbourne	Consulate-General	Countries: Fiji; Nauru; Papua New Guinea; Solomon Islands; Vanuatu	
Australia	Sydney	Consulate-General	Countries: Fiji; Nauru; Papua New Guinea; Solomon Islands; Vanuatu	
Australia	Adelaide	Consulate	Countries: Fiji; Nauru; Papua New Guinea; Solomon Islands; Vanuatu	
Australia	Brisbane	Consulate	Countries: Fiji; Nauru; Papua New Guinea; Solomon Islands; Vanuatu	
Australia	Perth	Consulate	Countries: Fiji; Nauru; Papua New Guinea; Solomon Islands; Vanuatu	
New Zealand	Wellington	Embassy	Countries: Cook Islands; Kiribati; Niue; Samoa; Tonga; Tuvalu	

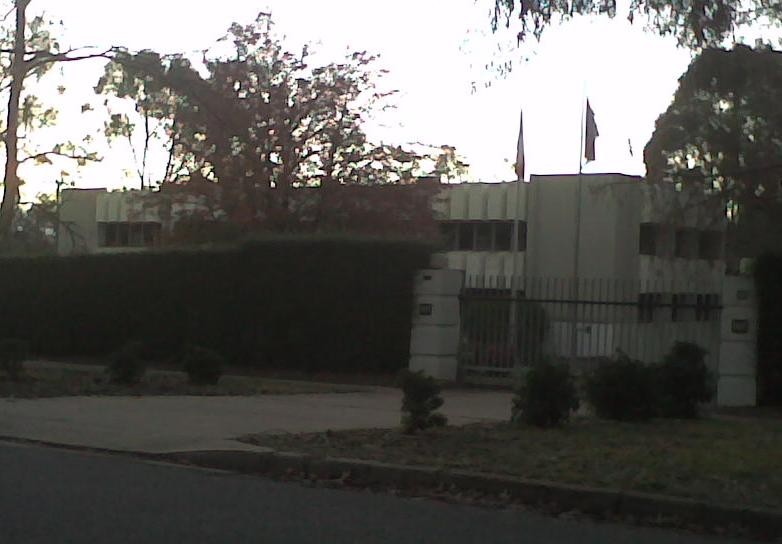
Embassy in Canberra

=== Multilateral organisations ===
Organization	Host city	Host country	Mission	Concurrent accreditation	Ref.
African Union	Addis Ababa	Ethiopia	Permanent Mission	International Organizations: United Nations Economic Commission for Africa	
Conference on Disarmament	Geneva	Switzerland	Permanent Mission		
Council of Europe	Strasbourg	France	Permanent Delegation		
European Union	Brussels	Belgium	Permanent Representation		
Food and Agriculture Organization	Rome	Italy	Permanent Representation	International Organizations: International Fund for Agricultural Development; World Food Programme	
NATO	Brussels	Belgium	Permanent Representation		
OECD	Paris	France	Permanent Delegation	International Organizations: European Space Agency; Financial Action Task Force; International Bureau of Weights and Measures; International Transport Forum; World Organisation for Animal Health	
OSCE	Vienna	Austria	Permanent Delegation		
United Nations	New York City	United States	Permanent Mission		
United Nations	Geneva	Switzerland	Permanent Mission	International Organizations: International Organization for Migration; World Health Organization; World Intellectual Property Organization; World Trade Organization	
United Nations	Vienna	Austria	Permanent Mission	International Organizations: CTBTO Preparatory Commission; International Atomic Energy Agency; United Nations Commission on International Trade Law; UNIDO; United Nations Office for Outer Space Affairs; United Nations Office on Drugs and Crime	
UNESCO	Paris	France	Permanent Delegation		

== Closed missions ==
=== Africa ===
Host country	Host city	Mission	Year closed	Ref.
Algeria	Annaba	Consulate	2000	
Algeria	Oran	Consulate	2000	
Egypt	Alexandria	Consulate	2014	
Madagascar	Antananarivo	Embassy (Note: Resident in Pretoria, Gauteng, South Africa)	2000	
Morocco	Tangier	Vice-consulate	2001	
Namibia	Windhoek	Embassy	2008	
South Africa	Durban	Consulate	2010	
Sudan	Khartoum	Embassy	2023	
Tunisia	Sfax	Vice-consulate	1998	

=== Americas ===
Host country	Host city	Mission	Year closed	Ref.
Canada	Hamilton	Vice-consulate	2000	
Haiti	Port-au-Prince	Embassy (Note: Resident in Santo Domingo, Distrito Federal, Dominican Republic)	Unknown	
Jamaica	Kingston	Embassy (Note: Resident in Washington, D.C., United States)	2000	
Honduras	Tegucigalpa	Embassy (Note: Resident in Guatemala City, Guatemala)	2014	
United States	Cleveland	Consulate	1980	
United States	New Orleans	Consulate	1997	
United States	Newark	Consulate	2014	

=== Asia ===
Host country	Host city	Mission	Year closed	Ref.
Afghanistan	Kabul	Embassy	2021	
Kingdom of Nepal	Kathmandu	Embassy (Note: Resident in New Delhi, India)	1997	
Yemen	Sana'a	Embassy	2015	

=== Europe ===
Host country	Host city	Mission	Year closed	Ref.
Albania	Shkodër	Consulate	2013	
Austria	Innsbruck	Consulate-General	2012	
Austria	Klagenfurt	Consulate-General	2000	
Belgium	Antwerp	Consulate-General	2000	
Belgium	Mons	Vice-consulate	2013	
Belgium	Liège	Consulate-General	2012	
Belgium	Namur	Consular agency	1998	
Croatia	Split	Consulate	2013	
France	Bastia	Consulate	2007	
France	Chambéry	Consulate	2008	
France	Lille	Consulate	2011	
France	Mulhouse	Consulate	2011	
France	Toulouse	Consulate	2013	
Germany	Bonn	Embassy branch office	2007	
Germany	Hamburg	Consulate-General	2010	
Germany	Mannheim	Consulate	2010	
Germany	Nuremberg	Consulate	2010	
Germany	Saarbrücken	Consulate	2010	
Greece	Thessaloniki	Consulate	2001	
Iceland	Reykjavík	Embassy (Note: Resident in Oslo, Norway)	2014	
Luxembourg	Esch-sur-Alzette	Consulate	2008	
Netherlands	Amsterdam	Consulate-General	2014	
Netherlands	Rotterdam	Consulate-General	1998	
Romania	Timișoara	Consulate	2014	
Switzerland	Lausanne	Consulate-General	2011	
Switzerland	Neuchâtel	Consular agency	2013	
Switzerland	St. Gallen	Consulate	2014	
Switzerland	Sion	Consular agency	2013	
Switzerland	Wettingen	Consular agency	2013	
United Kingdom	Glasgow	Consulate	1989	
United Kingdom	Bedford	Vice-consulate	2008	

== See also ==
- Foreign relations of Italy
- List of diplomatic missions in Italy
