= List of Armenian film directors =

Below is a list of well-known Armenian film directors

== From Armenia ==
- Hamo Beknazarian (May 19, 1891 – April 27, 1965), pioneer of Armenian cinema: best known for "Namus" (1925).
- Frunze Dovlatyan (May 26, 1927 – August 30, 1997), Armenian film director born in Gavar, Armenia. One of his most famous works are "Hello, That's Me!" (1967).
- Sergei Paradjanov (January 9, 1924 – July 20, 1990), Armenian film director born in Tbilisi, Georgia. His most famous works are Shadows of Forgotten Ancestors (1965) and The Color of Pomegranates (1969), one of the greatest masterpieces of the 20th century, a biography of the Armenian troubadour Sayat Nova written and directed by Paradjanov.
- Mikhail Vartanov (1937–2009), documentary filmmaker: best known film Parajanov: The Last Spring.
- Artavazd Peleshyan (born 1938), documentary film director, best known film Seasons of the Year (1975).

== From Diaspora ==
- Gariné Torossian, Canadian/Armenian
- Jerzy Kawalerowicz (19 January 1922 – 27 December 2007), was a Polish film director and politician, having been a member of Polish United Workers' Party from 1954 until its dissolution in 1990 and a deputy in Polish parliament since 1985 until 1989.
- Rouben Mamoulian (October 8, 1897 – December 4, 1987), Armenian-American film and theatre director. Born in Tbilisi, Georgia (ruled at that time by imperial Russia) to an Armenian family. He directed movies Dr. Jekyll and Mr. Hyde (1931), The Mark of Zorro (1940), Blood and Sand (1941).Oklahoma! (1943), Carousel (1945) and Lost in the Stars (1949). He directed the first three strip Technicolor film Becky Sharp (1935).
- Atom Egoyan (born July 19, 1960), critically acclaimed Armenian-Canadian film maker, known as one of the most remarkable figures of contemporary independent filmmaking. His work often explores themes of alienation and isolation, featuring characters whose interactions are mediated through technology, bureaucracy or other power structures, as Exotica (1994), The Sweet Hereafter (1997) and Ararat (2002). Egoyan was born Atom Yeghoyan in Cairo, Egypt, the son of Shushan (née Devletian) and Joseph Yeghoyan, artists who operated a furniture store. His parents were Armenian-Egyptians.
- Aram Avakian, American film director and editor (April 23, 1926 – January 17, 1987) Editor: See it Now, Sin of Jesus, Mickey One, Lilith, Miracle Worker, etc. Director: Jazz on a Summers Day, End of the Road, 11 Harrowhouse, Cops and Robbers, etc.
- Anna Melikian (born February 8, 1976, Baku, Azerbaijani SSR, Soviet Union), Russian-Armenian film and TV director/ producer whose work has been recognized with several awards. After her participation at Sundance Film Festival she was listed in the TOP 10 of most perspective film directors by Variety magazine.[1]
- Robert Guédiguian (born 3 December 1953 in Marseille), film director, actor, screenwriter and producer. Like Marcel Pagnol and René Allio before him, he anchors his films in social reality, flirting with militancy. His films are strongly marked by the local and regional environment of the city of Marseille, and in particular L'Estaque, (north-west Marseille), for example in Marius et Jeannette (1997). He directed the movies Marie-Jo et ses 2 amours (Marie-Jo And Her 2 Loves) (2002), Le Promeneur du Champ de Mars (The Last Mitterrand) (2005), Le Voyage en Arménie (Journey to Armenia) (2006) and The Army of Crime (2009).
- Hughes Brothers (born April 1, 1972), collective name for American twin brothers and film directors, producers and writers Albert and Allen Hughes. They are known for co-directing such visceral, and often violent, movies as Menace II Society and From Hell. Raised by their Armenian mother, Aida, they often talk about their Armenian background as a great support structure for their earliest film work, which began when they were 12.
- Deran Sarafian (born January 17, 1958), Armenian American actor, film and television director. Sarafian has directed several episodes of the Fox series House and was made a co-executive producer of the show for the 2007/08 season. He also directed a Season 2 Lost episode, titled "?", and has directed for CSI: Crime Scene Investigation, CSI: Miami, CSI: NY, Cold Case, The District, Without a Trace, Buffy the Vampire Slayer and Nash Bridges.
- Richard C. Sarafian (April 28, 1930 – September 18, 2013), Armenian American TV and film director. He is most popular for his film Vanishing Point (1971). He is the father of: Richard Sarafian Jr., Tedi Sarafian, Damon B. Sarafian, and Deran Sarafian.
- Francis Veber, French film director of Armenian and Jewish heritage. He is the father of author Sophie-Audouin Mamikonian, who is Pretender to the Throne of Armenia. He directed extremely popular comedies such as Le Jouet (The Toy), starring Pierre Richard, Michel Bouquet, Fabrice Greco (1976), La Chèvre (Knock on Wood), starring Gérard Depardieu, Pierre Richard (1981), Le Dîner de Cons (The Dinner Game), starring Thierry Lhermitte, Jacques Villeret (1998), Le placard (The Closet), starring Daniel Auteuil, Gérard Depardieu (2000) and La Doublure (The Valet), starring Gad Elmaleh, Alice Taglioni, Daniel Auteuil, Dany Boon, Virginie Ledoyen, Kristin Scott Thomas (2006).
- Mushegh Sarvarian (February 15, 1910 – August 13, 1981), Armenian-Iranian film director.
- Ovanes Ohanian (October 1896 – 1960), Armenian-Iranian filmmaker, inventor, founder, doctor, scientist with PhD in medicine, film, science and languages.
- Robert Ekhart (1935–1994), Armenian-Iranian, film director, and editor-in-chief.
- Aramais Aghamalian (born 1953), Armenian-Iranian film director, and editor.
- Varuzh Karim-Masihi (born March 24, 1952), Armenian-Iranian playwright and filmmaker.
- Samuel Khachikian (October 21, 1923 – October 22, 2001), Armenian-Iranian film director, screenwriter, author, and film editor.
- Henri Verneuil (October 15, 1920 – January 11, 2002), French-Armenian playwright and filmmaker.
- Noura Kevorkian Armenian-Lebanese-Syrian writer-director-producer. She was born in Aleppo, Syria but grew up in Lebanon and is a Lebanese citizen. She studied finance, Near and Middle Eastern Studies, and Cinema at the University of Toronto in Canada. Kevorkian is a filmmaker specializing in documentary and narrative genres for film and television. Her recent film BATATA won a prestigious Peabody Award, won the Best Feature Documentary (an Oscar-qualifying Tanit d’Or) at the Carthage Film Festival, the Human Rights Award at the Carthage Film Festival, the Amnesty Award at the Durban International Film Festival, the Audience Award TOP 10 Favourite Films at Hot Docs, and garnered three nominations in the 2023 Canadian Screen Awards.
- Lev Kulidzhanov, film director and professor at the Gerasimov Institute of Cinematography.
- Ovannes Ohanian, first Iranian film director.
- Roman Balayan, Ukrainian-Armenian film director.
- Yuri Yerznkyan, Soviet Armenian film director.
- Steven Zaillian, won an Academy Award, a Golden Globe Award and a BAFTA Award for his screenplay Schindler's List.
- Alexander Dinelaris Jr., won an Academy Award for Best Original Screenplay
