= Cinema of Armenia =

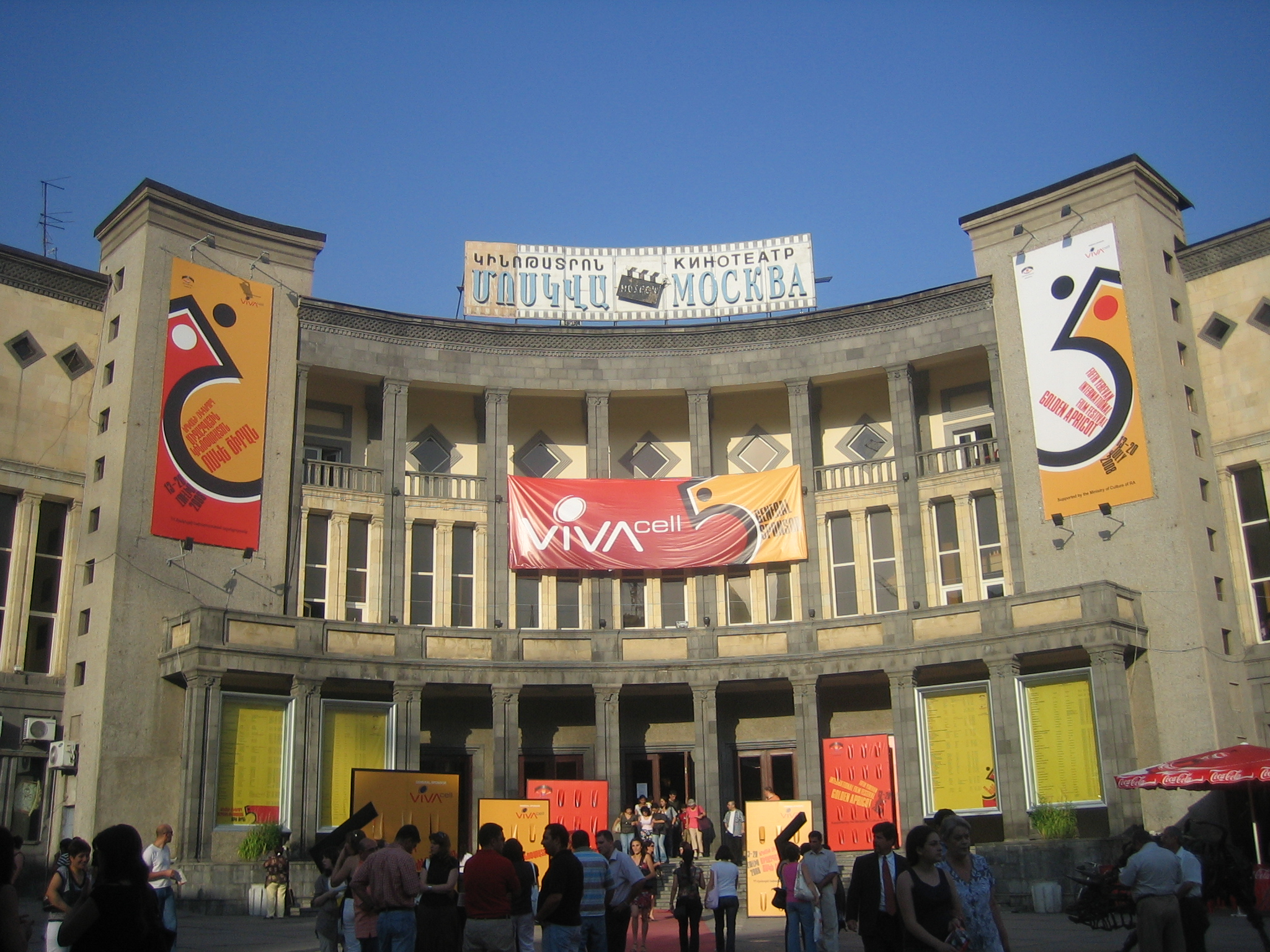
- Moscow Cinema in Yerevan

Produced feature films (2011)
- Fictional: 5
- Animated: -
- Documentary: -

The cinema of Armenia was established on 16 April 1923, when the Armenian State Committee of Cinema was established by government decree. The National Cinema Center of Armenia (NCAA), founded in 2006, is the governing body of film and cinema in Armenia. The NCAA preserves, promotes and develops Armenian cinematography and provides state financial support to full-length feature, short and animation projects. The Director of the NCCA is Shushanik Mirzakhanyan, and the headquarters are located in Yerevan.

== History ==
The first Armenian film with Armenian subject called "Haykakan Sinema" was produced in 1912 in Cairo by Armenian-Egyptian publisher Vahan Zartarian. The film was premiered in Cairo on 13 March 1913.

In March 1924, the first Armenian film studio: Armenfilm (Armenian: Հայֆիլմ "Hayfilm," Russian: Арменкино "Armenkino") was established in Yerevan, starting with Soviet Armenia (1924), an Armenian documentary film.

Namus was the first Armenian silent black-and-white film (1925), directed by Hamo Beknazarian and based on a play of Alexander Shirvanzade describing the ill fate of two lovers, who were engaged by their families to each other since childhood, but because of violations of namus (a tradition of honor), the girl was married by her father to another person. The first sound film, Pepo was shot in 1935, director Hamo Beknazarian.

More recent directors include:

- Sergei Parajanov (best known for The Color of Pomegranates)
- Henrik Malyan (Best known for Nahapet)
- Artavazd Peleshian (best known for Seasons of the Year)
- Hamo Beknazarian
- Edmond Keosayan
- Frunze Dovlatyan
- Mikhail Vartanov (best known for Parajanov: The Last Spring)
- Levon Mkrtchyan (Hovhannes Shiraz)
- Atom Egoyan (best known for Ararat)
- Harutyun Khachatryan
- J. Michael Hagopian, for his acclaimed documentaries on the Armenian genocide, modern Armenian history, and historical Armenia

Modern day Armenian cinema produces two or three features, eight shorts and fifteen documentary films each year.

== Film festivals ==
Film festivals held in Armenia include the following in Yerevan:

- The Golden Apricot Yerevan International Film Festival, since 2004
- The ReAnimania International Animation Film & Comics Art Festival of Yerevan, since 2005
- The Sose International Film Festival, held annually by the Zis Center of Culture since 2014

== International cooperation ==
National Cinema Center of Armenia logo

The National Cinema Center of Armenia (NCCA) became a member of the European Audiovisual Observatory in 2012 and a member of Eurimages in 2016. The NCCA also maintains an international relations department, which is tasked with coordinating activities related to the film industry, establishing business relations, and facilitating collaboration with European and international film structures.

== See also ==
- Armenfilm
- Armenian Film Society
- Armenian National Cinematheque
- Cinema of the world
- List of Armenian submissions for the Academy Award for Best International Feature Film
- List of theaters in Yerevan
- Media of Armenia
- Theater of Armenia
