= Tigran Mansurian =

Armenian composer (born 1939)

- Armenian: Տիգրան Մանսուրյան
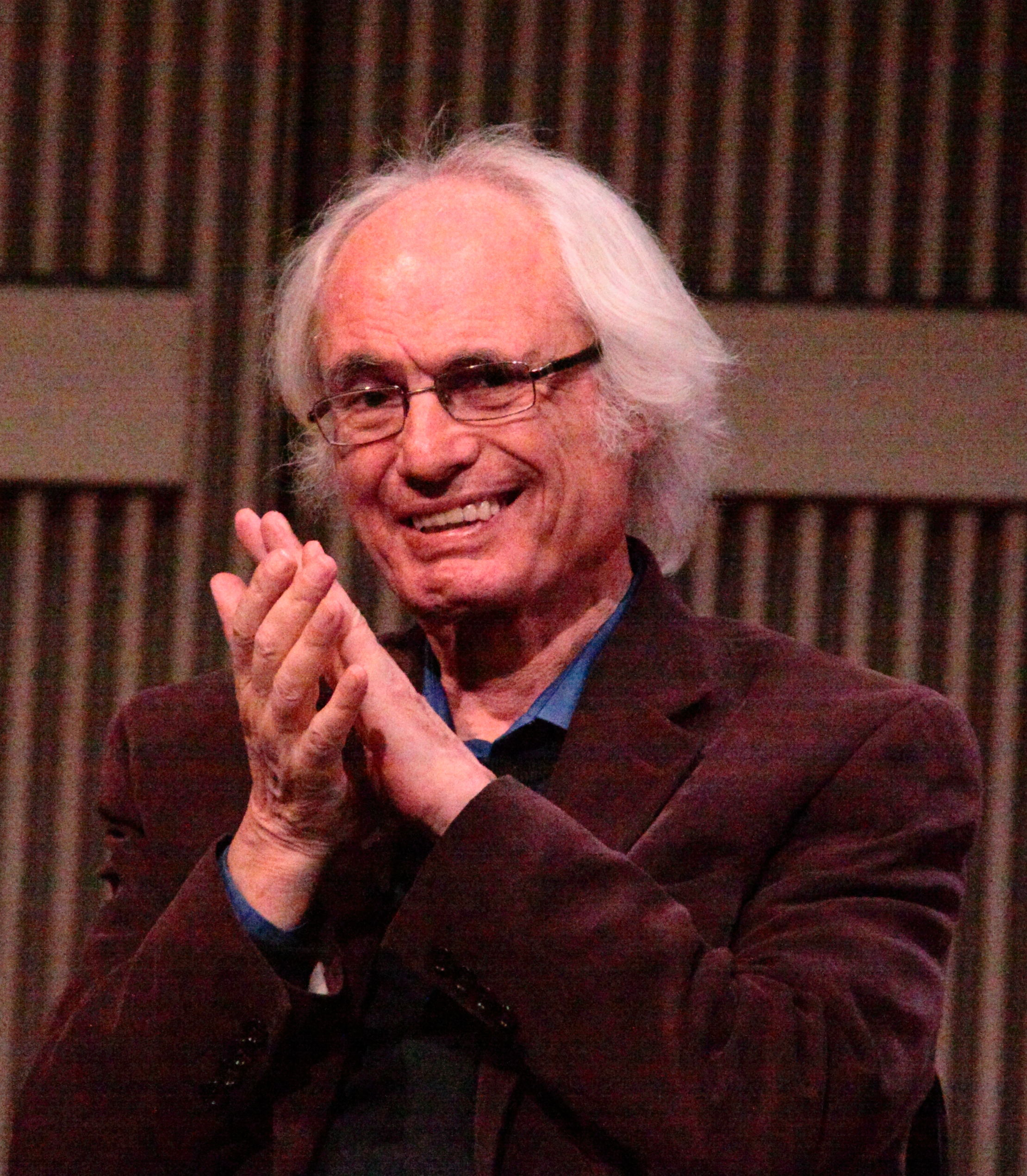
- Mansurian in San Francisco, 2015
- Born: Tigran Yeghiayi Mansurian; January 27, 1939 (age 87); Beirut, Greater Lebanon
- Occupations: Composer, Pianist; Academic teacher

Tigran Yeghiayi Mansurian (Armenian: Տիգրան Եղիայի Մանսուրյան; born January 27, 1939) is a leading Armenian composer of classical and film music, People's Artist of the Armenian SSR (1990), and Honored Art Worker of the Armenian SSR (1984). He is the author of orchestral, chamber, choir, and vocal works which have been played across the world.

== Biography ==
Mansurian was born in Beirut, Greater Lebanon on January 27, 1939. His family moved to the Armenian SSR in 1947 and settled in Yerevan in 1956, where he continued his education. He studied first at the Romanos Melikian Music School under the Armenian composer Edvard Baghdasaryan and later at the Yerevan Komitas State Conservatory. During his years of study, he wrote different works of varied genres and was awarded for some of them.

He taught modern music theory at the Conservatory from 1967 to 1986. He was the Rector of the Conservatory from 1992 to 1995.

An ECM album of Mansurian's music, Monodia, was nominated for the 2004 Grammy Award for "Best Instrumental Soloist(s) Performance (with Orchestra)" and "Best Classical Contemporary Composition". In 2017, ECM's recording of Mansurian's Requiem was nominated for two Grammys. The Requiem received the Presidential Award of Armenia for its commemoration of the victims of the Armenian Genocide.

On January 27, 2024, a concert of the Armenian State Symphony Orchestra commemorating Mansurian's 85th birthday occurred at Aram Khachaturian Concert Hall in Yerevan. Included was his viola concerto, "...and then I was in time again", played by Sergey Poltavsky. The program concluded with excerpts of Mansurian's film music.

== Recordings ==
- Tigran Mansurian: String Quartets - Rosamunde Quartett (ECM 1905)
- Tigran Mansurian: "…and then I was in time again", Lachrymae, Confessing with Faith – Kim Kashkashian, viola; Jan Garbarek, soprano saxophone; The Hilliard Ensemble; Christoph Poppen, conductor; Münchener Kammerorchester. (CD ECM 1850/51)
- Tigran Mansurian: Havik, Duet for viola and percussion – Kim Kashkashian, viola; Robyn Schulkowsky, percussion; Tigran Mansurian, piano, voice. (CD ECM 1754)
- Tigran Mansurian: Quasi parlando - Patricia Kopatchinskaja, violin; Anja Lechner, violoncello; Amsterdam sinfonietta; Candida Thompson. (ECM new series 2323)
- Tigran Mansurian: Con Anima - Kim Kashkashian, viola; Varty Manouelian, violin; Steven Vanhauwaert, piano; Moyses Pogossian. ECM 2687
- Tigran Mansurian: Konzerte - Liana Issakadze, violin; Ivan Monighetti, violoncello; Georgian Chamber Orchestra; Liana Issakadze. (Orfeo C 415 971 A)

== Works ==
Mansurian's compositions range from large scale orchestral works to individual art songs. He also composed ten film scores between 1968 and 1980. In 2017, a recording of Mansurian's Requiem, dedicated to the victims of the Armenian Genocide, was released by ECM. Mansurian's film music is melody, lyricism, and greatly contributes to the completion of the film's artistic description.

=== Stage ===
- The Snow Queen (ballet in two acts with a scenario by Vilen Galstyan, after the story by Hans Christian Andersen), 1989

=== Orchestral ===
- Concerto, for organ and small orchestra, 1964
- Partita, for large orchestra, 1965
- Music for Twelve Strings, 1966
- Preludes, for large orchestra, 1975
- To the Memory of Dmitry Shostakovich, for cello and large orchestra, 1976
- Canonical Ode, for harp, organ and 2 string orchestras, 1977
- Concerto No. 2, for cello and string orchestra, 1978
- Double Concerto, for violin, cello and string orchestra, 1978
- Tovem, for small orchestra, 1979
- Nachtmusik, for large orchestra, 1980
- Because I Do Not Hope (in memory of Igor Stravinsky), for small orchestra, 1981
- Concerto, for violin and string orchestra, 1981
- Concerto No. 3, for cello and small orchestra, 1983
- Postludio Concerto, for clarinet, cello, string orchestra, 1993
- Concerto, for viola and string orchestra, 1995
- Fantasy, for piano and string orchestra, 2003
- Concerto No. 2 (Four Serious Songs) for violin and string orchestra, 2006
- Concerto No. 2 (Three Arias - Sung Out the Window Facing Mount Ararat) for viola and orchestra, 2008
- Concerto No. 4 (Ubi est Abel frater tuus?) for cello and small orchestra, 2010
- Romance for violin and string orchestra, 2011
- Quasi parlando for cello and string orchestra, 2012

=== Chamber music ===
- Sonata, for viola and piano, 1962
- Sonata, for flute and piano, 1963
- Sonata No. 1, for violin, piano, 1964
- Allegro barbaro, for solo cello, 1964
- Sonata No. 2, for violin and piano, 1965
- Piano Trio, for violin, cello, and piano, 1965
- Psalm, for two flutes and violin, 1966
- Interior, for string quartet, 1972
- Silhouette of a Bird, for harpsichord and percussion, 1971–73
- Sonata No. 1, for cello and piano, 1973
- Sonata No. 2, for cello and piano, 1974
- Wind Quintet, for flute, oboe, clarinet, French horn, and bassoon, 1974
- The Rhetorician, for flute, violin, double bass, and harpsichord, 1978
- Capriccio, for solo cello, 1981
- String Quartet No. 1, 1983–84
- String Quartet No. 2, 1984
- Five Bagatelles, for violin, cello, and piano, 1985
- Tombeau, for cello and percussion, 1988
- Postludio, for clarinet and cello, 1991-92 (also has a concerto version)
- String Quartet No. 3, 1993
- Concerto, for English horn, clarinets, bassoons, trumpets, and trombones, 1995
- Hommage à Anna Akhmatova, for bass clarinet, qanun (zither), viola, and marimba, 1997
- Duo, for viola and percussion, 1998
- Dance, for viola and percussion, 1998
- Lacrimae, for soprano saxophone and viola, 1999;
- Lamento, for violin, 2002 (also has version for viola)
- Three Medieval Taghs, for viola and percussion, 1998–2004
- Testament, for string quartet, 2004
- Ode an den Lotus (Ode to the Lotus) for viola solo, 2012

=== Piano ===
- Sonatina No. 1, 1963
- Petite Suite, 1963
- Sonata No. 1, 1967
- Miniatures, 1969
- Three Pieces, 1970–71
- Nostalgia, 1976
- Three Pieces for the Low Keys, 1979
- Sonatina No. 2, 1987

=== Choral ===
- Three Poems, for mixed chorus, 1969 (text by Kostan Zaryan)
- Spring Songs, for mixed chorus, 1996 (text by Hovhannes Tumanyan),
- Confessing with Faith, for four male voices and viola, 1998 (text by Nerses Shnorhali)
- Ars Poetica concerto for mixed chorus, 1996–2000 (text by Yeghishe Charents)
- Motet, two mixed choruses, 2000 (text by Grigor Narekatsi),
- On the Shores of Eternity, for mixed chorus, 2003 (text by Avetik Isahakyan)

=== Vocal ===
- Three Romances, for mezzo-soprano and piano, 1966 (text by Federico García Lorca, translated into Armenian by Hamo Sahyan)
- Four Hayrens for mezzo-soprano (or viola) and piano, 1967 (text by Nahapet Kuchak)
- Intermezzo, for soprano and ensemble, 1972-73 (text by Vladimir Holan), score lost)
- I am Giving You a Rose, for soprano, flute, cello, and piano, 1974 (text by Matevos Zarifyan)
- Three Nairian Songs, for baritone and large orchestra, 1975–76 (text by Vahan Teryan)
- Three Madrigals, for soprano, flute, cello, piano, 1974–81 (text by Razmik Davoyan),
- Sunset Songs, for soprano and piano, 1984–85 (a song-cycle to text by Hamo Sahyan)
- The Land of Nairi for soprano and piano, 1986 (a song-cycle to text by Vahan Teryan),
- Miserere, for soprano and string orchestra, 1989 (texts by Saint Mesrob based on the Bible in Armenian translation)
- Madrigal IV, for soprano, flute, clarinet, violin, cello, piano, and tubular bells, 1991 (text by Alicia Kirakosyan)
- Requiem, for soprano, baritone, mixed chorus and string orchestra, 2011

=== Film scores ===
- The Color of Pomegranates, 1968 (directed by Sergei Parajanov)
- The Color of Armenian Land, 1968 (directed by Mikhail Vartanov)
- Autumn Pastoral, 1971 (directed by Mikhail Vartanov)
- And So Every Day, 1972 (directed by Mikhail Vartanov)
- We and Our Mountains, 1969 (directed by Henrik Malyan)
- Seasons of the Year, 1975 (directed by Artavazd Peleshyan)
- Autumn Sun, 1979 (directed by Bagrat Oganesyan)
- Legend of the Clown, 1979 (directed by Levon Asatryan)
- A Piece of Sky, 1980 (directed by Henrik Malyan)
- The Tango of Our Childhood, 1984 (directed by Albert Mkrtchyan)
