= List of theaters in Yerevan =

Yerevan the capital and the cultural centre of Armenia is home to a number of professional theaters.

As of 2016, Yerevan is home to 21 theaters:

== State theatres ==
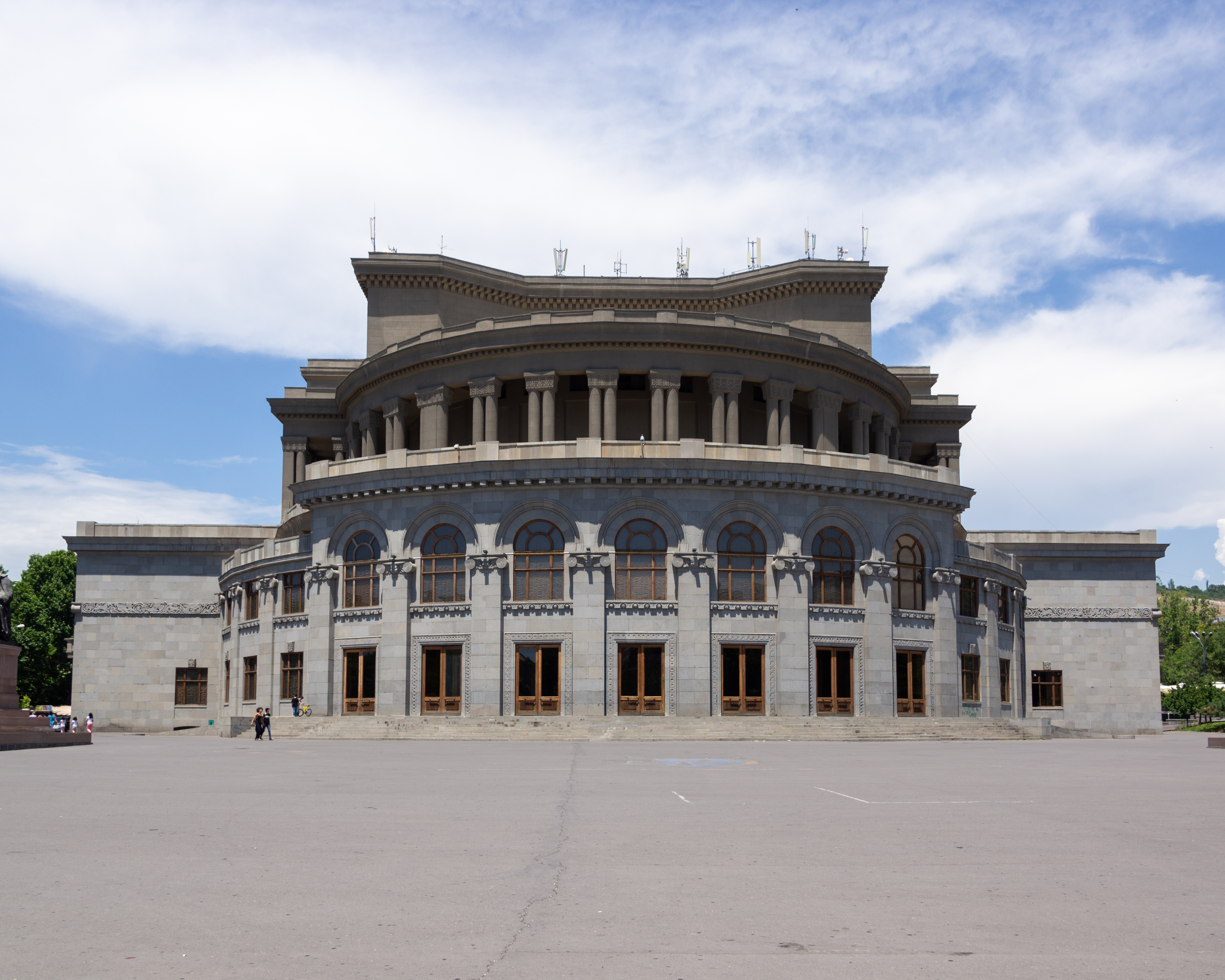
Armenian National Theatre of Opera and Ballet

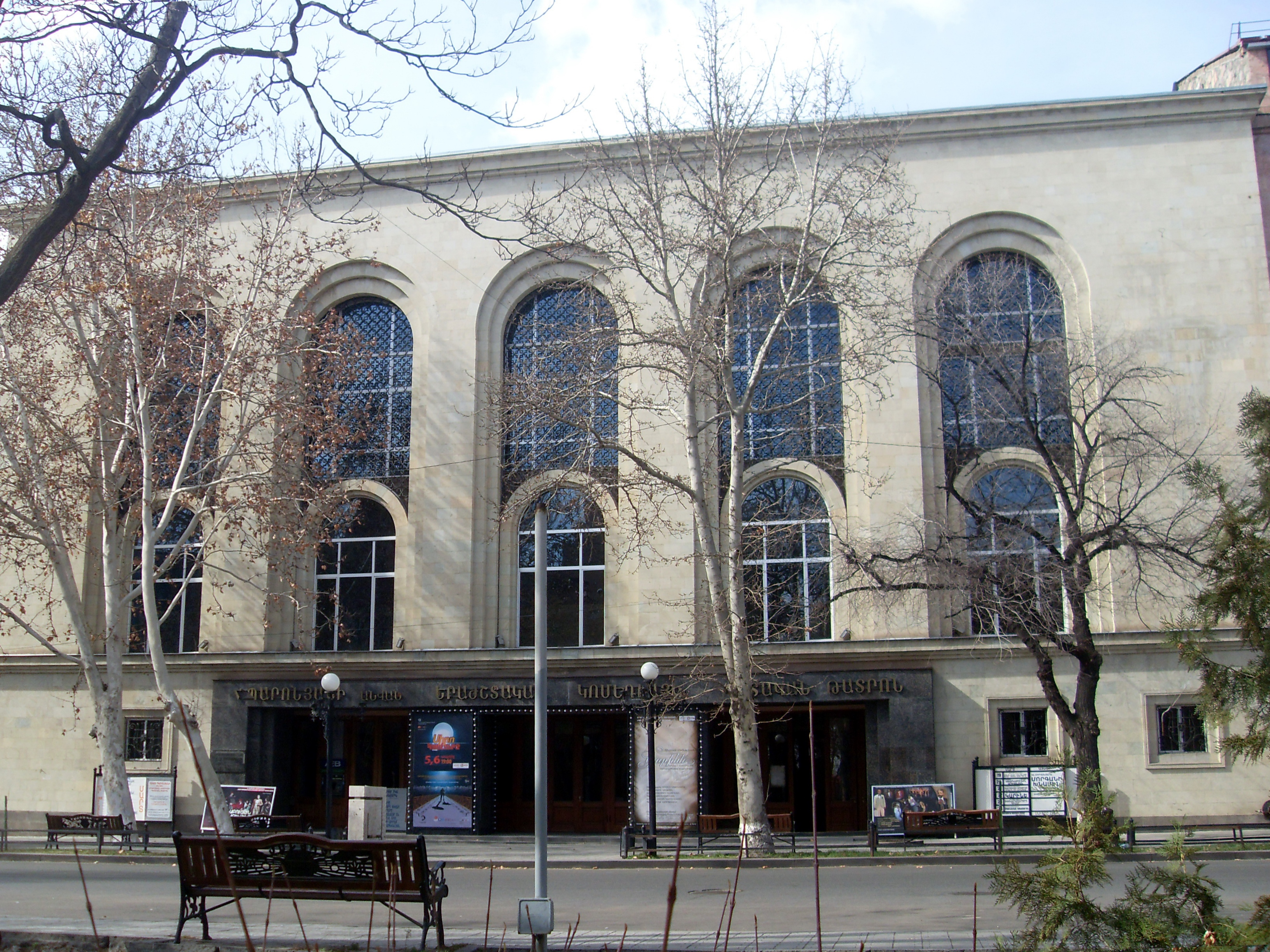
H. Paronyan Musical Comedy Theatre

- Gabriel Sundukyan State Academic Theatre (1922)
- Yerevan Theatre of the Young Spectator (1929)
- Armenian National Academic Theatre of Opera and Ballet named after Alexander Spendiaryan (1933)
- Yerevan State Puppet Theatre named after Hovhannes Tumanyan (1935)
- Russian Drama Theatre named after Konstantin Stanislavski (1937)
- Hakob Paronyan State Musical Comedy Theatre (1941)
- Yerevan State Pantomime Theatre (1974)
- Experimental Youth Theatre of Yerevan (1978)
- Henrik Malyan Film-actor's Theatre (1980)
- State Chamber Theatre of Yerevan (1982)
- Small Theatre of the National Center of Aesthetics (1986)
- State Chamber Musical Theatre of Yerevan (1987)
- Yerevan State Marionettes Theatre (1987)
- Hamazgayin State Theatre named after Sos Sargsyan (1991)
- Metro Theatre of the National Center of Aesthetics (1992)
- State Song Theatre of Armenia (1994)

== Municipal theatres ==
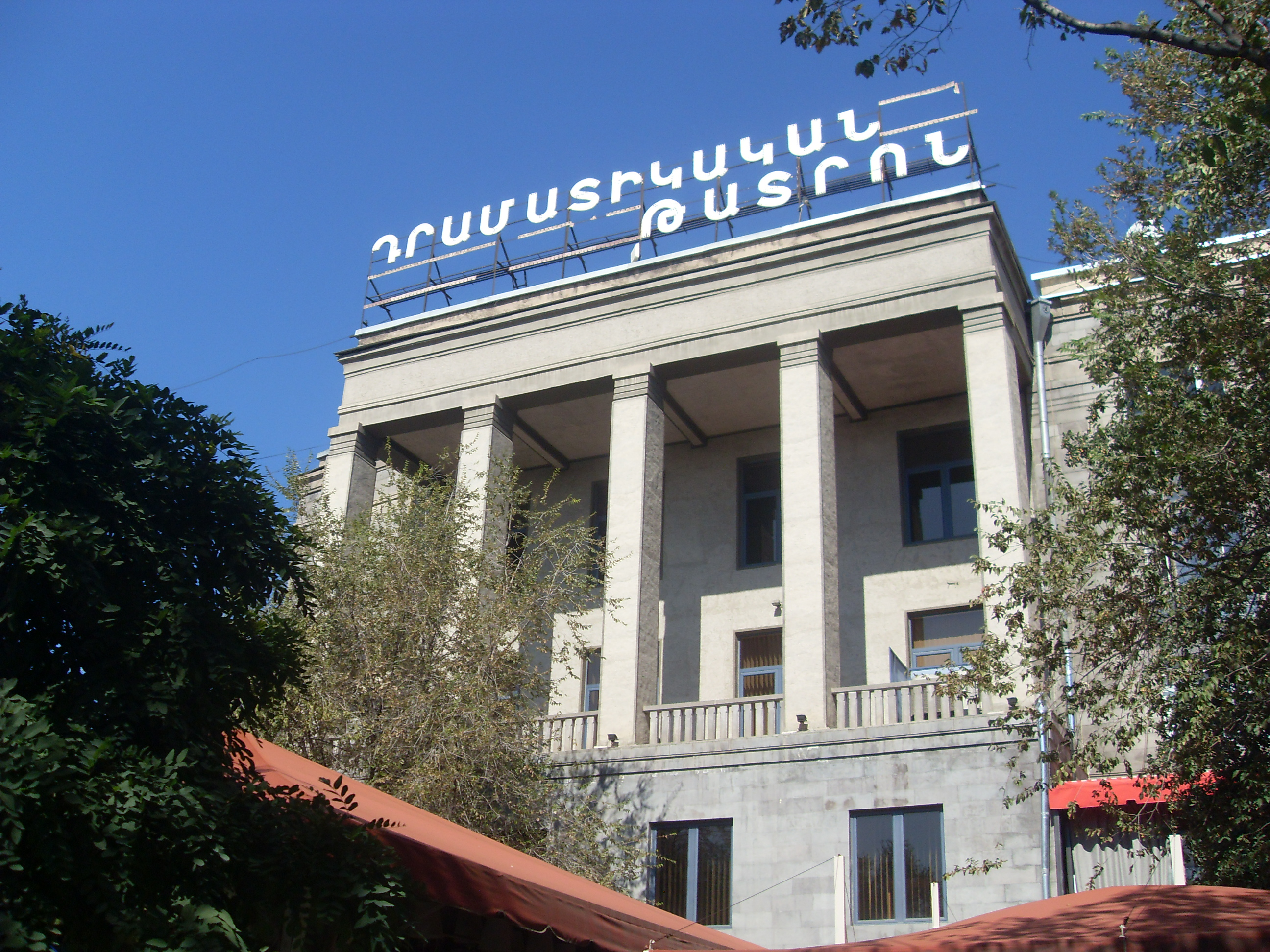
H. Ghaplanyan Drama Theatre

- Hrachya Ghaplanyan Drama Theatre (1967)
- Mher Mkrtchyan Artistic Theatre (1986)

== Private theatres ==
- Agulis Puppet Theatre-Studio (1988)
- GOY Theatre of the National Experimental Centre of Performing Arts (1988)
- Edgar Elbakyan Theatre of Drama and Comedy (1993)
- Arten Theatre (2022)

== Cinema theatres ==
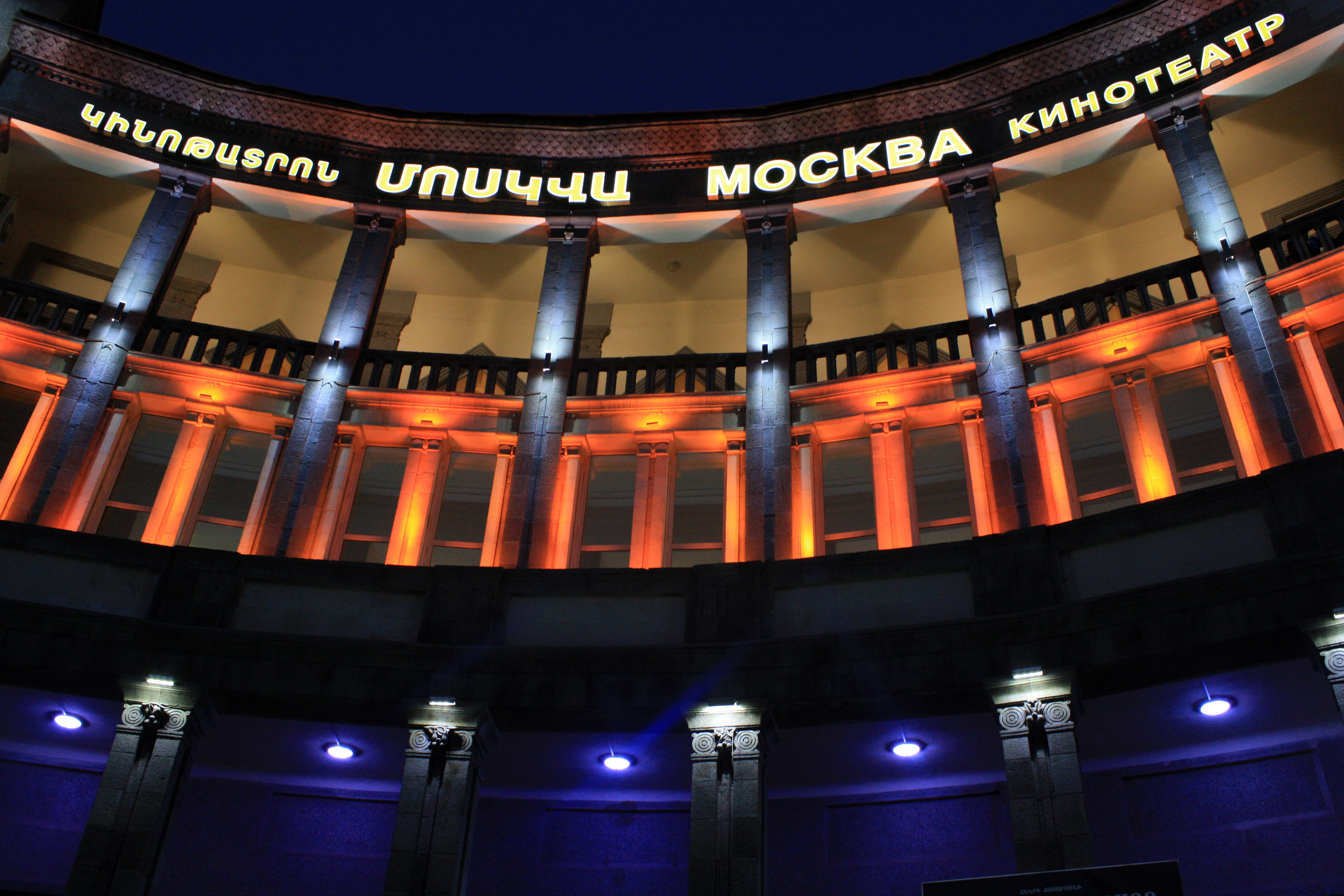
Moscow Cinema

- Nairi Cinema (1920)
- Moscow Cinema (1936)
- Cinema Star (Dalma Garden Mall) (2013)
- Hayastan Cinema (reopened 2015)
- KinoPark (Yerevan Mall) (2015)

== See also ==
- Cinema of Armenia
