= Vilen Galstyan =

Armenian ballet dancer and actor (1941–2021)

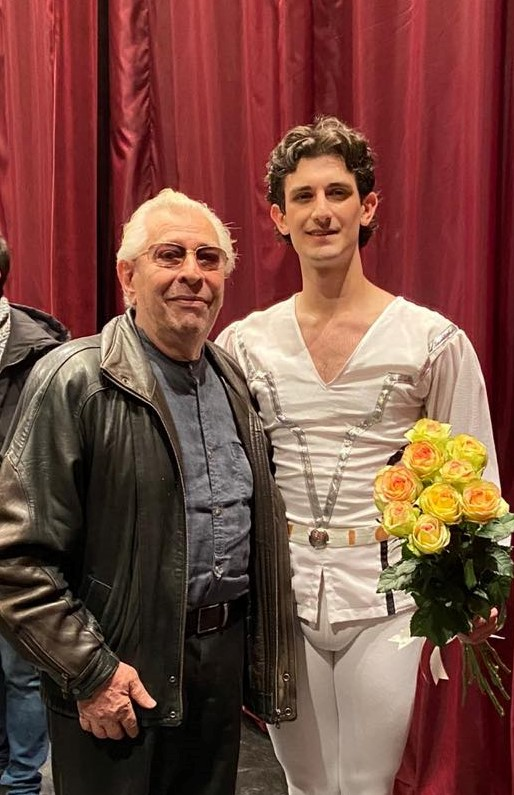
- Born: 12 February 1941; Yerevan, Armenian SSR, Soviet Union
- Died: 4 June 2021 (aged 80)

Vilen Galstyan (Armenian: Վիլեն Գալստյան, (Vilen Sargsyan) 12 February 1941 – 4 June 2021) was an Armenian ballet dancer and actor who was popular in the former U.S.S.R. and especially in Armenia. He was awarded the honorary title People's Artist of Armenia.

== Biography ==
Galstyan was born on 12 February 1941 in Yerevan. He trained at Yerevan Choreographic School, before he began performing with Spendiaryan Opera and Ballet Theater. He also performed internationally, including at the Bolshoi Theatre. He took part in a Canadian tour with Mikhail Baryshnikov, during which Baryshnikov defected. Galstyan stated that he was questioned by the KGB as a result. He won gold medals at Varna International Ballet Competition and another international competition in Cairo in 1968 and 1971 respectively. He appeared in over 60 films during his 40-year career, including in The Color of Pomegranates, after he was spotted by director Sergei Parajanov during a performance of Giselle.

After studying at the balletmaster department of Russian Institute of Theatre Arts, he started staging ballets worldwide. In 2000, he started the balletmaster department at Yerevan State Institute of Theatre and Cinematography. From 2014, he was the chief choreographer of Spendiaryan Opera and Ballet Theater. He also served as the director of Yerevan Choreographic College. He was awarded the People's Artist of Armenia honorary title. In 1967, he was awarded the State Prize of the Armenian SSR.

He was married to ballet dancer and teacher Nadezhda Davtyan, and had a daughter who became an opera singer, and a son who is also a ballet dancer. He died on 4 June 2021.
