= Andriesh =

1954 fantasy film

- Russian: Андриеш
- Directed by: Yakov Bazelyan; Sergei Parajanov
- Written by: Grigory Koltunov
- Based on: "Andriesh" by Emilian Bucov
- Starring: Giuli Chokhonelidze; Konstantin Russu; Nodar Şaşıqoğlu
- Cinematography: Suren Shakhbazyan; Vadim Vereshchak
- Music by: Ihor Shamo; G. Tirceu
- Production company: Dovzhenko Film Studios
- Release date: 1954
- Running time: 63 min.
- Country: Soviet Union
- Language: Russian

Andriesh (Russian: «Андриеш») is a 1954 Soviet film directed by Yakov Bazelyan and Sergei Parajanov.

The film tells the tale of the young shepherd Andriesh, who dreamed of becoming a knight, the magic flute that the hero Vainov gave him, and the fight against the evil wizard Black Whirlwind, who hates everything living.

== Plot ==
The evil sorcerer Black Whirlwind kidnaps the flock of a young shepherd boy, Andriesh, along with his beloved talking sheep, Miora, and his loyal dog, Lupar.

Heartbroken, Andriesh embarks on a journey to rescue them. He receives a magical flute as a gift from the warrior Vainovan, which is meant to guide him to the castle of Black Whirlwind, who despises all living things.

On his perilous journey, the fearless Andriesh encounters many oppressed people suffering under Black Whirlwind's tyranny and lends his help to them. Though dangers and enemies lurk at every turn, he also finds allies along the way.

In the film's climax, Black Whirlwind is defeated and turned into a black stone, restoring peace and harmony to the land.

== Cast and crew ==
=== Cast ===
- Giuli Chokhonelidze
- Konstantin Russu
- Nodar Şaşıqoğlu
- Lyudmila Sokolova
- Domnica Darienco
- Robert Klyavin
- Trifon Gruzin

=== Crew ===
- Cinematography: Suren Shakhbazyan; Vadim Vereshchak
- Music: Ihor Shamo; G. Tirceu
- Directed by: Yakov Bazelyan; Sergei Parajanov
- Written by: Emilian Bucov; Grigory Koltunov

== Production ==
Andriesh was co‑directed by Yakov Bazelyan and Sergei Parajanov, marking his first feature film. Adapted from a fairy tale by Moldavian poet Emilian Bukov, it expanded on one of Parajanov’s student projects. Cinematography was by Suren Shahbazyan, later known for The Color of Pomegranates (1969). Produced in the Soviet Union in 1954.

== Screenings ==
On 7 January 2026, Andriesh was screened in Singapore in the Asian Film Archive’s Retrospective: Sergei Parajanov.

On 28 March 2026, Andriesh was screened at the Gallery of Modern Art in Brisbane, introduced as Sergei Parajanov’s feature debut.

In May 2026, Andriesh was presented at Edinburgh TradFest, preceded by a live performance from Edinburgh’s Ukrainian Choir.

== Reception ==
In 2008, Pat Graham of Chicago Reader described Andriesh as "the first surviving feature of the celebrated Ukrainian director Sergei Parajanov," noting the story of a young Moldavian shepherd who receives a magic flute.

In 2026, Robert Munro of Eye For Film mentioned Andriesh in the Folk Film Gathering strand on folk tales in cinema, describing it as the story of a shepherd boy with a magic flute and an example of how folk culture can be conveyed through film.
