= Sergei Parajanov Museum =

Museum in Yerevan, Armenia

Coordinates: 40.178773°N 44.500124°E

Sergey Parajanov Museum
- Սերգեյ Փարաջանովի թանգարան
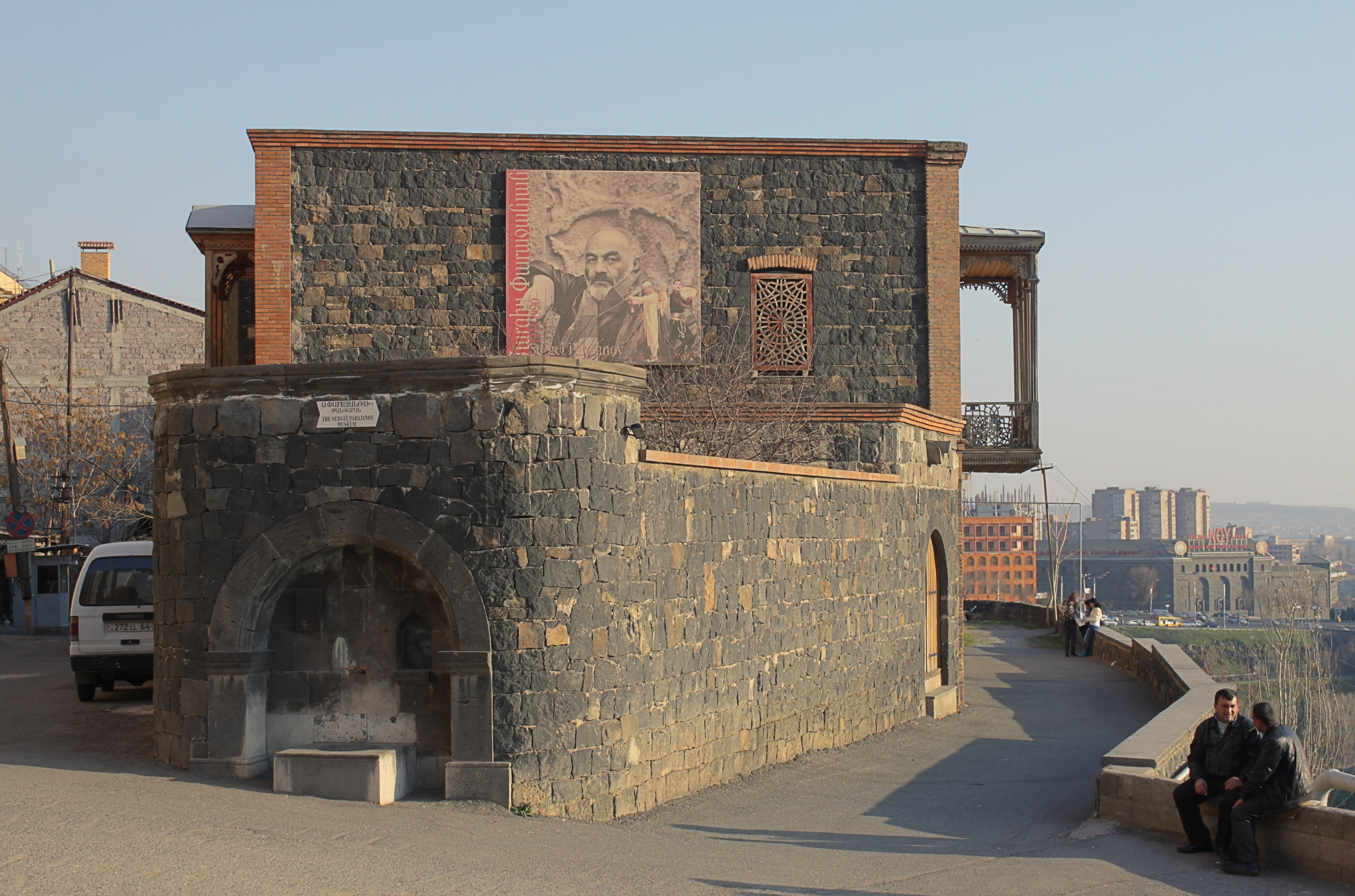
- The Sergei Parajanov Museum atop the Hrazdan Gorge in Yerevan
- Established: 1988
- Location: Yerevan, Armenia
- Director: Zaven Sargsyan

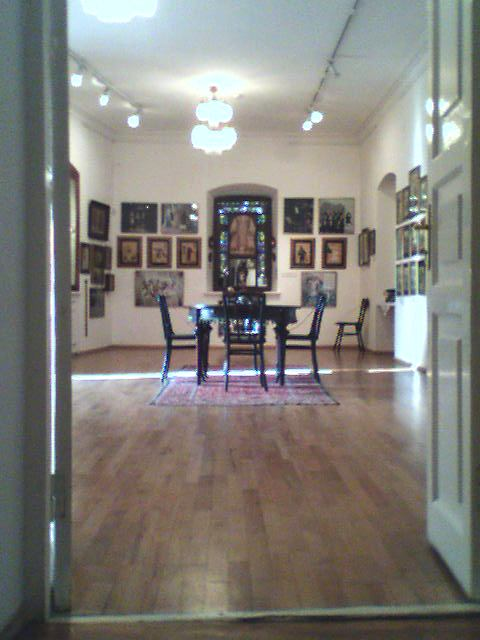
Inside the Museum

The Sergei Parajanov Museum (Armenian: Սերգեյ Փարաջանովի թանգարան, romanized: Sergey P'arajanovi t'angaran) is a tribute to Soviet Armenian film director and artist Sergei Parajanov and is one of the most popular museums in Yerevan. It represents Parajanov's diverse artistic and literary heritage.

== History ==
The museum was founded in 1988 when Parajanov moved to Yerevan. Parajanov himself chose the place (Dzoragyugh ethnographic center in Yerevan) and construction project of museum. Due to the 1988 Armenian earthquake and socio-economic problems, the museum was opened only in June 1991, one year after Parajanov's death.

The founding director of museum is Zaven Sargsyan. The museum is one of the cultural centers of Yerevan, known for its exhibitions, publications and honorary receptions (including the annual meetings of Yerevan International Film Festival guests). Paulo Coelho, Wim Wenders, Mikhail Vartanov, Tonino Guerra, Enrica Antonioni, Atom Egoyan, Nikita Mikhalkov, Vladimir Putin, Aleksandr Lukashenko, Yevgeni Yevtushenko, Arnold Rüütel, Valdas Adamkus, Tarja Halonen, Donald Knuth and many other famous people have visited the museum.

== Exhibition ==
The museum is situated in a traditional Caucasian-style building and consists of two floors. Comprising some 1,400 exhibits, the museum's collection includes installations, collages, assemblages, drawings, dolls and hats. The museum also showcases unpublished screenplays, librettos and various artworks which Parajanov created while in prison. Among the other exponates of museum are two re-created memorial rooms, original posters, festival prizes, signed letters by Federico Fellini, Lilya Brik, Andrey Tarkovsky, Mikhail Vartanov, and Yuri Nikulin, gifts by famous visitors Tonino Guerra, Vladimir Putin and Roman Balayan, who is the author of "A Night at Paradganov's Museum" film. The museum uses art and exposition principles of Parajanov himself.

The museum has organized about 50 exhibitions, including those at Cannes, Athens, Tokyo, Moscow, Rome, Tehran, and Hollywood.

According to "Rediscovering Armenia" guide, "the best museum in Yerevan is small and idiosyncratic, the would-be final home of famed Soviet filmmaker Sergei Parajanov".

"Is there anywhere in the world a museum of Sergei Parajanov? A museum of his works - his graphics, dolls, collages, photographs, 23 screenplays and librettos of unrealized productions in cinema, theater, ballet...It would become an adornment and pride of any city. I know that sooner or later Paradjanov's screenplays would be published in a book and I hope that the city with that museum is going to be Yerevan."

— Mikhail Vartanov (1985)
