= Vremena goda =

Vremena goda (Времена года) is Russian for "seasons of the year." It may refer to:

- The Seasons (ballet), an 1899 ballet by Marius Petipa
- Seasons of the Year, a 1975 film by Artavazd Peleshyan
