= Commander of the Ship =

1954 film by Vladimir Braun

- Directed by: Vladimir Braun
- Starring: Mikhail Kuznetsov; Anatoliy Verbitskiy
- Cinematography: V. Filippov; Aleksei Gerasimov
- Edited by: Nadezhda Ratmanskaya
- Music by: Vadim Gomolyaka
- Production company: Dovzhenko Film Studios
- Release date: 1954
- Running time: 104 min
- Country: Soviet Union
- Language: Russian

Commander of the Ship (Russian: Командир корабля, romanized: Komandir korablya) is a 1954 Soviet drama film directed by Vladimir Braun.

== Plot ==
The new graduate of the Naval Academy, captain of the third rank Vysotin becomes captain of the destroyer "Sovereign", obtaining it from his teacher captain Zolotov, who gets transferred to the headquarters. The command sets the task to bring the "Sovereign" into the number of advanced ships as soon as possible. Vysotin also bitterly learns that his beloved woman Tatiana has married Svetov, Captain of the Guard destroyer "Bold".

Vysotin starts to work. He decides to focus on improving the combat capability of the ship and the involvement of the whole team. Political officer Paramonov helps him overcome the difficulties by resorting to unexpected measures. For instance, he orders to steer the ship through a little-known Southern Strait, and the ship's doctor to command the landing. Svetov laughs at his actions and believes that the most important thing is iron submission to the commander.

Teachings commence. Suddenly, the mediator (Zolotov) orders the commanders and senior officers to withdraw from the command ("Killed") and navigators to lead ships through the South Channel. "Sovereign" brilliantly overcomes trials and on the "Bold", Svetov has to take control. Also during exercise the incorrigible sailor Stebelev, transferred from the "Bold" to Vysotin's team, makes a feat by eliminating on track a machine malfunction. Svetov recognizes Vysotin's victory.

The commander appoints Zolotov to his new cruiser. Zolotov takes a part of Vysotin's team. But he does not lose heart and is ready to further work with arrived replenishment.

== Cast ==
- Mikhail Kuznetsov - Captain Andrei Vysotin
- Anatoly Verbitsky - Captain Igor Svetov
- Lyudmila Sokolova - Tatiana Svetova
- Boris Smirnov - Captain Zolotov
- Nina Krachkovskaya - Natasha Zolotova
- Viktor Dobrovolsky - Admiral Serov
- Vladimir Balashov as Paramonov
- Vsevolod Tyagushev as Kiparisov (as Vladimir Tyagushev)
- Igor Gorbachyov as Plaksin
- Isai Gurov as Rossinsky
