= Parajanov: The Last Spring =

Parajanov: The Last Spring Փարաջանով. Վերջին գարուն Параджанов: Последняя весна
- Directed by: Mikhail Vartanov
- Written by: Mikhail Vartanov; Martiros Vartanov
- Starring: Sergei Parajanov; Sofiko Chiaureli; Mikhail Vartanov; Aleksandr Kaidanovsky; Silva Kaputikyan; Bella Akhmadulina
- Distributed by: Parajanov-Vartanov Institute
- Release date: 1992
- Running time: 60 minutes
- Countries: Armenia; United States
- Language: Russian/Armenian/English

Parajanov: The Last Spring (Russian: Параджанов: Последняя весна, romanized: Paradzhanov: Poslednyaya vesna; Armenian: Փարաջանով. Վերջին գարուն, romanized: P'arajanov. Verjin garun; French: Paradjanov : Le dernier printemps) is a 1992 award-winning documentary by the Russian-Armenian filmmaker Mikhail Vartanov, that also includes the complete surviving footage of Sergei Parajanov's unfinished last film The Confession, Vartanov's behind-the-scenes sequences of Parajanov at work on the shooting of the Color of Pomegranates and other material. Featured in 7th Annual Russian Academy of Cinema Arts Awards (1993).

== Awards and honors ==
- 2003—Beverly Hills Film Festival: Golden Palm Award
- 1993—Nika Awards: Best Documentary Film
- 1995—San Francisco International Film Festival: Golden Gate Award
- 2012— Busan International Film Festival: Eternal Travelers for Freedom Retrospective

== Quotes ==
- "Mikhail Vartanov...made a wonderful film Parajanov: The Last Spring." Martin Scorsese
- "Mikhail Vartanov's film Parajanov: The Last Spring...exemplifies the power of art over any limitations." Francis Ford Coppola
- "Mikhail Vartanov's fascinating document Parajanov: The Last Spring...is an important and alluring film for all those who love the form of cinema..." Jim Jarmusch

== Bibliography ==
- Dixon & Foster. "A Short History of Film." New Brunswick, NJ: Rutgers University Press, 2008. ISBN 9780813542690
- Schneider, Steven. "501 Directores de Cine." Barcelona, Spain: Grijalbo, 2008. ISBN 9788425342646
- "Francis Ford Coppola recognizes…" Hollywood Reporter (20 October 2015)
- Perreault, Luc. "Paradjanov - The Last Spring." "La Presse" a12, 14 June 1994 (French language)
- Thomas, Kevin. "Intoxicating spirit." "Los Angeles Times" (1 January 2004).
