= The First Lad =

- Russian: Первый парень
- Directed by: Sergei Parajanov
- Written by: V. Bezorudko; P. Lubenskiy
- Produced by: Aleksey Yarmolski
- Starring: Tamara Alexeeva; Andrei Andrienko-Zemskov; Varvara Chayka; Grigori Karpov; Yelena Kovalenko
- Cinematography: Sergei Revenko
- Music by: Yevgeni Zubtsov
- Release date: 1958
- Country: Soviet Union
- Language: Russian

The First Lad (Russian: Первый парень) is a 1958 Soviet comedy-drama film directed by Sergei Parajanov.

== Plot ==
Sergeant Danila returns to his native village, where he organizes the construction of the stadium to make life in the village a bit more interesting, and Yushka, nicknamed "The First Lad", becomes the first football player...

== Cast ==
- Tamara Alexeeva
- Andrei Andrienko-Zemskov
- Varvara Chayka as The Mother of Odarka
- Grigori Karpov as Yushka
- Yelena Kovalenko
- Mikhail Kramar
- Yuriy Satarov as Danila
- Nikolay Shutko
- Lyudmila Sosyura as Odarka
