= Flower on the Stone =

1962 drama film

- Directed by: Anatoly Slesarenko; Sergei Parajanov
- Written by: Vadim Sobko
- Starring: Inna Burduchenko; Boris Dmokhovsky
- Cinematography: Aleksei Prokolenko
- Edited by: M. Ponomarenko
- Music by: Ihor Shamo
- Production company: Dovzhenko Film Studios
- Release date: 1962
- Running time: 76 minutes
- Country: Soviet Union
- Language: Russian

Flower on the Stone (Russian: «Цветок на камне», romanized: Tsvetok na kamne) is a Soviet 1962 drama film directed by Anatoly Slesarenko and Sergei Parajanov.

The film premiere took place on 1 September 1962 in Kyiv. The regular cinema screenings began on January 24, 1963. The film had a total of 5.2 million viewers. The black and white film has been screened with english subtitles.

== Plot ==
In place of the Donetsk steppe, overgrown with chamomile and feather grass, a mining town is being developed. Brigadier of the youth mine Grigory Griva is in love with comrade Lyuda and therefore often openly sneers at her organizational skills. But when he is alone with her, he becomes timid and shy, for which he is angry with himself and makes up new pranks.

The second story is connected with the appearance of Christina in the mining town, a beautiful but closed-minded girl who falls under the influence of the presbyter of the sect. Komsomol member Arsen who has fallen in love with the girl helps her leave the sect.

== Cast ==
- Grigory Karpov – Grigory Griva, sinker
- Lyudmila Cherepanova – Lyuda, the Komsomol of the mine
- Inna Burduchenko – Christina, sectarian
- Boris Dmokhovsky – Pavel Fedorovich Varchenko, the head of the mine
- Georgy Epifantsev – Arsen Zagorny
- Mikhail Nazvanov – Zabroda, the librarian
- Dmitry Franko – Pasha Chmykh
- Vladimir Belokurov – father of Christina
- Alexander Gai – father of Lyuda
- Anatoly Soloviev – Peter the Great
- Boryslav Brondukov – Kovalyov

== Production ==
Because of lack of safety on the set actress Inna Burduchenko died in hospital after suffering third degree burns while filming a scene in a burning barracks. She initially became famous for playing the main role in the religious drama Ivanna. The director of the film Anatoly Slesarenko was prosecuted for this and convicted. Sergei Parajanov completed the work on the film and gave it a new title (the original one was Thus Nobody Loved).
