= Vadym Sobko =

Soviet writer

Vadym Mykolayovych Sobko (Ukrainian: Вадим Миколайович Собко; 18 May [O.S. 5 May] 1912, Moscow – 12 September 1981, Kyiv) was a Soviet and Ukrainian writer, screenwriter and dramatist. His 1950 novel, Guarantee of Peace, was an early example of Cold War-era anti-American propaganda and was awarded the Stalin Prize (1951). He also received an Order of the Patriotic War, 1st class, two Orders of the Red Banner of Labour, two Orders of the Red Star, and a Shevchenko National Prize.

He wrote the screenplay of the 1962 drama film Flower on the Stone.
