= Lyudmila Sokolova =

Lyudmila Vasilievna Sokolova (1929–2015) was a Soviet actress and one of the first television announcers in Soviet Union.

== Biography ==
Sokolova was born on June 3, 1929, in Moscow, where she graduated from the acting department of the GITIS.

The actress played in the Noginsk Drama Theatre, then in the Russian Drama Theatre (Minsk).

Since 1957, she has worked as a television announcer.

== Filmography ==
- The Young Guard (1948)
- The Composer Glinka (1952)
- Andriesh (1954)
- Commander of the Ship (1954)
