= Arten Theatre =

Independent chamber theatre in Yerevan, Armenia

Arten
- արդեն
- Formation: 2022
- Type: Theatre group
- Location: Yerevan, Armenia
- Coordinates: 40.17725°N 44.49424°E
- Artistic director: Alexander Teterev-Kosach
- Website: arten.theater

Arten (stylised arten, արդեն, "already") is an independent chamber theatre in Yerevan, Armenia. It was founded in 2022 by theatre practitioners who had moved to Armenia from Russia. Besides performances, the theatre hosts laboratories, lectures, seminars, exhibitions and play readings, and runs an acting studio. Since 2025 it has been based at 2 Lusinyants Street.

== Name ==
The Armenian word արդեն means "already". According to one of the founders, the name was first meant as "Already a theatre", and the second word was later dropped. The theatre writes its name in both the Armenian and Latin alphabets.

== History ==
The theatre opened in late 2022. Its founders included the actor and director Alexander Teterev-Kosach, who had worked in Moscow theatres before emigrating. For its first two years it worked on Orbeli Brothers Street, in the studio of the artist Araik Petrosyan, in a hall for about 25 spectators. There the director Vsevolod Lisovsky performed, the anti-war exhibition Deadlock was shown, and the theatre held laboratories, seminars, lectures and readings of the Echo of Lyubimovka play festival. The last event at that venue was a political cabaret on 28 September 2024. The theatre then spent about eight months in Jrvezh, at the Lepota art residency.

== Lusinyants Street ==
Since May 2025 the theatre has occupied a former House of Culture at 2 Lusinyants Street, near the Ararat brandy factory. The hall seats about 50. Novaya Gazeta described it in 2026 as the centre of a theatre community in Yerevan.

The theatre runs a studio, the Uzhe ("Already") course, with acting and voice training, physical theatre, documentary playwriting, rhythm, theatre history and philosophy seminars; the Verbatim and The Pillowman laboratories grow out of it. Studio members take part in the theatre's readings.

In May 2025 the director Alexander Plotnikov staged The Book of Mourning, based on the Book of Lamentations by Gregory of Narek. In June 2025 the Japanese artist Katsura Kan gave a week-long seminar on butoh and Noh. Readings of the Echo of Lyubimovka were held again in 2025, two of them directed by Teterev-Kosach. In 2026 the theatre was one of the venues of the Chronofest festival. Moves and the departure of some actors meant that the theatre released few new productions in 2024–2025.

== Productions ==
Season	Production	Director
2022/23	The Emigrants, after Sławomir Mrożek	Pavel Artemyev
2022/23	Planned Outage, documentary performance	Anahit Ghazaryan, Nadezhda Israelyan
2023/24	Traitors, after Milan Kundera's The Unbearable Lightness of Being	Pavel Artemyev
2024/25	Political Cabaret	
2024/25	Alpha Centauri, one-man show	Alexander Plotnikov
2024/25	The Book of Mourning, after Gregory of Narek	Alexander Plotnikov
2025/26	The Autumn of the Patriarch, after Gabriel García Márquez, one-woman show	Ulyana Kirpichenko
2025/26	Presence, performance	Andrey Lyubomir
	Love. Magnetic Fields, after Lyudmila Petrushevskaya and André Breton	
