= Seasons of the Year =

Soviet/Armenian 1975 documentary film

- Russian title card
- Armenian: Տարվա եղանակները
- Directed by: Artavazd Peleshyan
- Written by: Artavazd Peleshyan
- Cinematography: Mikhail Vartanov
- Edited by: Aïda Galstyan
- Music by: Tigran Mansurian
- Production company: Armenfilm
- Release date: 1975
- Running time: 29 minutes
- Country: Soviet Union
- Languages: Armenian (minimal dialogue); Russian inter-titles

Seasons of the Year (Armenian: Տարվա եղանակները, romanized: Tarva yeghanaknery; Russian: Времена года, romanized: Vremena goda), also called The Seasons or Four Seasons, is a 1975 Soviet–Armenian short documentary film written and directed by Artavazd Peleshyan.

The film depicts the struggles of an isolated Armenian farming community against seasonal elements. Armenian folk music is mixed with Vivaldi's Four Seasons. We see the villagers raising sheep and cattle, rolling haystacks down a hillside, dealing with rain and storms, celebrating a wedding, and sliding down a snowy hill while carrying sheep.

== Production ==
Seasons of the Year was filmed by Mikhail Vartanov in black-and-white on 35 mm film in the Armenian SSR. It was Peleshyan's first film not using archive footage.

It was his second and last collaboration with cinematographer Mikhail Vartanov, after Autumn Pastoral (1971).

== Release ==
Seasons of the Year was released in 1975. Decades later it became critically admired in the West, showing at the 40th Berlin International Film Festival (1990), CPH:DOX (2003), the 68th Venice International Film Festival (2011) and the International Documentary Film Festival Amsterdam (2012 and 2021). The scene of farmers sliding down the snowy hills with sheep and rolling haystacks down a steep hill have become famous.

=== Restoration ===
In 2026, five decades after its original release, Cineteca di Bologna under Peleshyan's supervision restored five silent shorts films from his filmography, including Seasons of the Year. The 4K scanning took place at Public Television Company of Armenia, in association with: Cinema Foundation of Armenia, Public Television Company of Armenia, VGIK and Belarusfilm. Additional support by: ZDF/Arte, ArMa Media Production LLC and Calouste Gulbenkian Foundation.

== Legacy ==
Andrei Ujică listed it among his favourite films, calling it "not a frame too short, not a frame too long." Verena Paravel also described seeing it on her first day of film school, calling it "the beginning of a cognitive and creative revolution for me." Ian Christie has written that Seasons of the Year is "a vivid calendar of land and animal husbandry," comparing it to Salt for Svanetia (1930).

It was listed at #47 on Sight & Sound's list of the Critics’ 50 Greatest Documentaries of All Time, and finished #14 on the Filmmakers' list.
