= Artavazd Peleshyan =

Armenian director

- Արտավազդ Փելեշյան
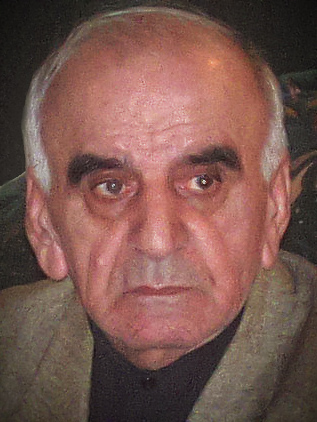
- Peleshyan in 2008
- Born: February 22, 1938 (age 88); Leninakan, Shirak Province, Armenian SSR, USSR (modern Gyumri, Armenia)
- Education: All-Union State Institute of Cinematography
- Occupations: director, documentarian, screenwriter, film theorist
- Years active: 1964–present
- Notable work: Seasons of the Year
- Spouse: Aïda Galstyan
- Awards: People's Artist of the Armenian SSR; Merited Artist of the Russian Federation

Artavazd Peleshyan (Armenian: Արտավազդ (Արթուր) Փելեշյան, romanized: Artavazd (Art’ur) P’eleshyan; also Pelechian, Peleshian; born February 22, 1938) is an Armenian director of essay films, a documentarian in the history of film art, a screenwriter, and a film theorist. He is renowned for developing a style of cinematographic perspective known as distance montage, combining perception of depth with oncoming entities, such as running packs of antelope or hordes of humans. Filmmaker Sergei Parajanov has referred to Peleshyan as "one of the few authentic geniuses in the world of cinema". Peleshyan was awarded the title of Merited Artist of the Armenian SSR in 1979, and Merited Artist of the Russian Federation in 1995.

His films have been described as being on the border between a documentary and a feature film, somewhat reminiscent of the work of such avant-garde filmmakers as Bruce Conner, rather than of conventional documentaries. However, it has been noted that his work, unlike Maya Deren's, is not firmly within the avant-garde, and that it does not try to explore the absurd. Peleshyan's films have been summarized as "a poetic view of life transferred onto film."

He has made extensive use of archive footage and for the first time used only original footage in his most celebrated film, Seasons of the Year, shot by cinematographer Mikhail Vartanov. Telephoto lenses are often used to get "candid camera" shots of people engaging in mundane tasks.

Most of Peleshyan's films are short, ranging from 6 to about 60 minutes long, and feature no dialogue. However, music and sound effects play nearly as important a role in his films as the visual images in contributing towards the artistic whole. Nearly all of his films were shot in black-and-white.

In 2020, the Fondation Cartier pour l’art contemporain presented Artavazd Peleshyan: La Nature, a major exhibition that premiered his first new film in over twenty-five years, Nature, and highlighted his enduring influence on documentary and experimental cinema.

== Works ==
Peleshyan's early films, made when he was still a student at VGIK, were awarded several prizes. Twelve films by Peleshyan are known to exist. The Beginning (Armenian: Սկիզբը Skizbe) (1967) is a cinematographical essay about the October Revolution of 1917. One of the unique visual effects used in this film is achieved by holding snippets of film still on a single frame, then advancing only for a second or two before again pausing on another, resulting in a stuttering visual effect.

Peleshyan is widely credited with developing a distinct cinematic method known as 'distance montage' (or 'remote montage'), which abandons traditional linear montage in favor of a more holistic, rhythmic unity — transforming montage from a chain of cuts into a ‘magnetic field’ around the entire film.

Other important films by him are We (Armenian: Մենք Menq) (1967), a poetically told history of Armenia and its people, and Inhabitants (Russian: Обитатели Obitateli) (1970), a reflection on the relationship between wildlife and humans.

Artavazd Peleshian's most significant film is considered, by many critics, to be Seasons of the Year (Armenian: Տարվա եղանակները Tarva yeghanaknere) (1975), shot by cinematographer Mikhail Vartanov. It is a look at the contradiction and harmony between humans and nature and was the last collaboration between Peleshian and Vartanov, Armenia's two most important documentary auteurs, who first worked together on The Autumn Pastoral (Armenian: Աշնանային հովվերգություն Ashnanayin hovvergutyun) (1971).

Peleshyan is also the author of a range of theoretical works, such as his 1988 book, My Cinema (Russian: Моё кино Moyo kino).

Being from a country removed from internationally significant cinema circles, Peleshyan's efforts were not initially well-recognized by critics of world cinema. Since the fall of the Soviet Union, he has made two more short films, Life (Armenian: Կյանք Kyanq) (1993) and The End (1994). He is now living in Moscow. His most recent film, Nature (French: La nature), was edited at the ZKM | Karlsruhe Film Institute in 2005-2006 and was premiered in 2020.

== Personal commentary ==
In 1998, Peleshyan reflected on his approach to filmmaking and cinematography,

"It's about what I'm striving for, what we're all striving for - every person, humanity [...] the wishes and desires of the people to ascend, to transcend [...] I was thinking of everything. It's not specifically the seasons of the year or of people: it's everything [...] Eisenstein's montage was linear, like a chain. Distance montage creates a magnetic field around the film [...] Sometimes I don't call my method 'montage'. I'm involved in a process of creating unity. In a sense I've eliminated montage: by creating the film through montage, I have destroyed montage. In the totality, in the wholeness of one of my films, there is no montage, no collision, so as a result montage has been destroyed. In Eisenstein every element means something. For me the individual fragments don't mean anything anymore. Only the whole film has the meaning [...] For me, distance montage opens up the mysteries of the movement of the universe. I can feel how everything is made and put together; I can sense its rhythmic movement."

== Filmography ==
=== As director ===
- Mountain Vigil (1964)
- Earth of People (1966)
- The Beginning (1967)
- Dream (1968)
- We (1969)
- Inhabitants (1970)
- Stellar Minute (1972)
- Seasons of the Year (1975)
- Our Century (1982)
- God in Russia (1984)
- The End (1992)
- Life (1993)
- Nature (2020)

=== As screenwriter ===
- The Autumn Pastoral (1971) (directed by Mikhail Vartanov)
- Homo Sapiens (1979)
- Desert (1984)

=== As actor ===
- We and Our Mountains (1969) (as Revaz)
- The Silence of Peleshyan (2011) (himself)

== Bibliography ==
- Mikhail Vartanov. "Artavazd Peleshyan" Garun magazine, Armenia, 1971.
- Peleshian, Artavazd. "Moyo Kino" Sovetakan grokh, Armenia, 1988.
- Peleshyan, Artavazd. "Remote montage and cinema by Artavazd Peleshyan" - in Italian. Ed. in Italy, 1989.
- Peleshyan, Artavazd. "OUR CENTURY" - in German and English. Ed. in Austria and Germany, 2004.
- Peleshyan, Artavazd. "Remote montage and distance theory" - in Spanish and English. Ed. in Mexico, 2011.
- Peleshyan, Artavazd. "Matter and Space — Films by Artavazd Peleshyan" - in Spanish and French. Ed. in Colombia and in France, 2011.
- Peleshyan, Artavazd. "Remote montage by Artavazd Peleshyan" - in Czech. Ed. in the Czech Republic, 2016.
- Peleshyan, Artavazd. "Capturing time // articles, essays, press conferences, master classes, creative meetings, film theory, unrealized projects / a collection of materials from two parts" - Yerevan: Tigran Mets, 2016.
- Peleshyan, Artavazd. "Peace Symphony" - in French. Ed. in France, 2017.
- Peleshyan, Artavazd. "My universe and unified field theory" - in Russian. Ed. in Armenia, 2017.
- Peleshyan, Artavazd. "My universe and unified field theory" - in English. Ed. in Armenia, 2018.
- Artavazd Peleschian, Gerald Matt, Angela Stief, Ursula Blickle Stiftung. Our age. —Bielefeld, Kerber. — New York, Wien: Distributed Art Publishers, Kunsthalle, 2004.
