= The Color of Pomegranates =

1969 film by Sergei Parajanov

- DVD cover
- Armenian: Նռան գույնը
- Directed by: Sergei Parajanov
- Screenplay by: Sergei Parajanov
- Based on: Poems by Sayat-Nova
- Starring: Sofiko Chiaureli; Melkon Aleksanyan; Vilen Galstyan; Giorgi Gegechkori
- Narrated by: Armen Dzhigarkhanyan
- Cinematography: Suren Shakhbazyan
- Edited by: Sergei Parajanov; M. Ponomarenko; Sergei Yutkevich
- Music by: Tigran Mansuryan
- Production company: Armenfilm
- Distributed by: Criterion/Janus Films/World Cinema Project (US); Cosmos Film (France); Artkino Pictures (US); IFEX (US)
- Release date: 1969
- Running time: 78 minutes (Armenia); 73 minutes (USSR release)
- Country: Soviet Union
- Language: Armenian

The Color of Pomegranates, (Note: Armenian: Նռան գույնը, romanized: Nřan guynə; Georgian: ბროწეულის ფერი, romanized: brots'eulis peri; Russian: Цвет граната, romanized: Tsvet granata, or Color of Pomegranates) originally known as Sayat-Nova, is a 1969 Soviet Armenian avant-garde film written and directed by Sergei Parajanov. The film is a poetic treatment of the life of 18th-century Armenian poet and troubadour Sayat-Nova. The film is regarded as a landmark in cinema history, and was met with widespread acclaim among filmmakers and critics. It is often considered one of the greatest films ever made.

== Overview ==
The Color of Pomegranates is a biography of the Armenian ashug (bard), Sayat-Nova (1712–1795), that attempts to reveal the poet's life visually and poetically rather than literally. The film is presented with little dialogue, using active tableaux which depict the poet's life in chapters: Childhood, Youth, Prince's Court (where he falls in love with a tsarina), The Monastery, The Dream, Old Age, The Angel of Death, and Death. There are sounds, music, and occasional singing, but dialogue is rare. Each chapter is indicated by a title card and framed through both Sergei Parajanov's imagination and Sayat Nova's poems. Actress Sofiko Chiaureli plays six roles in the film, both male and female. According to the film critic Frank Williams, Parajanov's film celebrates the survival of Armenian culture in face of oppression and persecution: "There are specific images that are highly charged—blood-red juice spilling from a cut pomegranate into a cloth and forming a stain in the shape of the boundaries of the ancient Kingdom of Armenia; dyers lifting hanks of wool out of vats in the colours of the national flag, and so on".

== Inspiration ==
Parajanov said his inspiration was "the Armenian illuminated miniature," and that he "wanted to create that inner dynamic that comes from inside the picture, the forms and the dramaturgy of colour." He also described this film as a series of Persian miniatures.

== Versions ==
Some Russian versions of The Color of Pomegranates have Special Edition features. The Memories of Sayat Nova, by Levon Grigoryan, is a 30-minute synopsis that explains what is happening in the tableaux and in each chapter of the poet's life. G. Smalley asserts that every carefully composed image in The Color of Pomegranates is coded to a meaning, but the key to interpreting them is missing. He agrees with Parajanov that "If someone sat down to watch The Color of Pomegranates with no background, they would have no idea what they were seeing." The making of the film and its different versions are explored in the other special features: "Introduction" by writer and filmmaker Daniel Bird; The World Is A Window: Making The Colour of Pomegranates—a new documentary by Daniel Bird; and "Commentary" by Levon Abrahamyan, moderated by Daniel Bird.

== Cast and crew ==
- Sofiko Chiaureli – Poet as a Youth/Poet's Love/Poet's Muse/Mime/Angel of Resurrection
- Melkon Aleksanyan – Poet as a child (as Melkon Alekyan)
- Vilen Galstyan – Poet in the cloister
- Giorgi Gegechkori – Poet as an old man
- Spartak Bagashvili – Poet's father
- Medea Japaridze – Poet's mother
- Hovhannes Minasyan – Prince
- Onik Minasyan – Prince
- Mikael Arakelyan – Set decorator
- Stepan Andranikyan – Production designer
- Mikhail Vartanov – Behind-the-scenes documentarian

== Locations ==
The film was shot at numerous historic sites in Armenia, including the Sanahin Monastery, the Haghpat Monastery, the St. John church at Ardvi, and the Akhtala Monastery. All are medieval churches in the northern province of Lori. Locations in Georgia included the Alaverdi Monastery, the countryside surrounding the David Gareja monastery complex, and the Dzveli Shuamta complex near Telavi. Azerbaijani locations included the Old City of Baku and Nardaran Fortress.

== Censorship ==
Soviet censors and Communist Party officials objected to Parajanov's stylized, poetic treatment of Sayat-Nova's life, and complained that it failed to educate the public about the poet. As a result, the film's title was changed from Sayat-Nova to The Color of Pomegranates, and all references to Sayat-Nova's name were removed from the credits and chapter titles in the original Armenian release version. The Armenian writer Hrant Matevosyan wrote new, abstractly poetic Armenian-language chapter titles. Officials further objected to the film's abundance of religious imagery, although a great deal of religious imagery still remains in both surviving versions of the film. Initially the State Committee for Cinematography in Moscow refused to allow distribution of the film outside of Armenia. It premiered in Armenia in October 1969, with a running time of 77 minutes.

The filmmaker Sergei Yutkevich, who had served as a reader for the script in the State Committee for Cinematography's Script Editorial board, recut the film slightly and created new Russian-language chapter titles in order to make the film easier to understand and more palatable to the authorities. In addition to cutting a few minutes' worth of footage—some of it clearly due to its religious content—he changed the order of some sequences. The film ultimately received only a limited release in the rest of the Soviet Union, in Yutkevich's 73-minute version.

== Reception and legacy ==
On review aggregator website Rotten Tomatoes, the film has an approval rating of 94% based on 18 retrospectively collected reviews, with an average rating of 7.2/10. In 1980 Janet Maslin of The New York Times wrote that "the film is elusive in any circumstances. However, anything this purely mysterious has its magic." The Color of Pomegranates made the Top 10 list for 1982 in Cahiers du cinéma.

Filmmaker Mikhail Vartanov has said, "Besides the film language suggested by Griffith and Eisenstein, the world cinema has not discovered anything revolutionarily new until The Color of Pomegranates, not counting the generally unaccepted language of the Andalusian Dog by Buñuel". According to Michelangelo Antonioni, "Parajanov's Color of Pomegranates is of a stunningly perfect beauty. Parajanov, in my opinion, is one of the best film directors in the world."

French filmmaker Jean-Luc Godard said, "In the temple of cinema there are images, light and reality. Sergei Paradjanov was the master of that temple."

Film critic Gilbert Adair argued that "although in both style and content it gives us the impression, somehow, of predating the invention of the cinema, no historian of the medium who ignores The Color of Pomegranates can ever be taken seriously." The work ranked 84th in the 2012 Sight & Sound critics' poll of the world's greatest films and appeared in another list of the greatest films by Time Out.

== Restoration ==
In 2014 the film was digitally restored and re-edited to be as close as possible to the director's original vision and world premiered at the 67th Cannes Film Festival. The US premiere took place on 20 September 2014 at The Academy at Los Angeles County Museum of Art (LACMA), and was introduced by Martiros Vartanov. The East Coast premiere took place at the 52nd New York Film Festival on 2 October 2014, and was introduced by Martin Scorsese. The restoration was completed by Scorsese's Film Foundation in conjunction with Cineteca di Bologna, and was described by critic and Toronto festival programmer James Quandt as "a cinematic Holy Grail". Martin Scorsese received the 2014 Parajanov-Vartanov Institute Award for the restoration of The Color of Pomegranates.

A Blu-ray of the restoration was released in the UK on 19 February 2018, and an American release by Criterion with Mikhail Vartanov's 1969 documentary The Color of Armenian Land on 17 April 2018.

== Queer themes ==
The film is further characterized by queer and androgynous imagery. For example, the main actress Sofiko Chiaureli plays both the Poet and his lover; imagery like the conch shell and feather, symbols of the female and male respectively, are used in tandem by multiple characters; and the young poet's sexual awakening comes when he sees nude male and female bodies in the bath house. This is in line with Parajanov’s own life, as he was convicted for homosexual acts, as well as nationalism, multiple times in Georgia (1948) and Ukraine (1973, imprisoned in Russia), which discriminated against homosexual people due to demographic concerns and a Stalinist ideological basis: homosexuality was seen as a social disease that threatened the collective Soviet ethos. Thus, this androgyny can be read as parallel to the film’s disruption of the traditional ethnic unity, permeated by state ideology, which it accomplishes by interweaving facets of Armenian, Georgian, Ukrainian, and Russian cultural traditions.

== Influence in popular culture ==
Madonna's 1995 music video Bedtime Story restages some content from the movie (such as the scene of a young child lying in a fetal position on a pentagram on the floor while an adult covers it with a blanket, and another where a naked foot crushes a bunch of grapes lying on an inscribed tablet), among other artistic inspiration depicting dreams and surrealist artwork in the video.

Without permission, Nicolas Jaar released the album Pomegranates, described as an "alternative soundtrack" for the movie, in 2015. A screening of the film with a live performance by Jaar was scheduled at Cinefamily in Los Angeles for February 22, 2017, but the performance was replaced with the original soundtrack due to objections from the Parajanov-Vartanov Institute and The Film Foundation that the live performance would not present the film as Parajanov intended it.

Lady Gaga's "911" music video released in September 2020 is openly influenced by the movie.

== See also ==
- Cinema of Armenia
- List of biographical films
- List of films based on poems
