= Parajanov-Vartanov Institute =

- Founded: 2010
- Location: United States
- Website: institute.parajanov.com

The Parajanov-Vartanov Institute is an American film organization based in Los Angeles, California, that works to study, preserve and promote the legacy of filmmakers Sergei Parajanov and Mikhail Vartanov.
