= Mikhail Vartanov =

Soviet film director (1937–2009)

- Михаил Вартанов; Միքայել Վարդանով
- Born: February 21, 1937; Russian SFSR, Soviet Union
- Died: December 29, 2009 (aged 72); Los Angeles, California, U.S
- Occupations: Director, cinematographer, screenwriter, art critic
- Notable work: Parajanov: The Last Spring
- Website: https://www.parajanov.com

Mikhail Vartanov (Russian: Михаил Вартанов, Armenian: Միքայել Վարդանով, February 21, 1937 – December 29, 2009) was a Soviet filmmaker and cinematographer who made significant contribution to world cinema with the documentary films Parajanov: The Last Spring and Seasons of the Year.

He is considered an important cinematographer and documentarian of his generation, noted for artistic collaborations with Sergei Parajanov and such influential documentary films as Parajanov: The Last Spring, The Seasons (directed by Artavazd Peleshyan), The Color of Armenian Land, and a series of essays including Unmailed Letters.

== Early career ==
Vartanov's debut film, The Color of Armenian Land, marked the beginning of his trademark style, afterwards dubbed as the "direction of undirected action." This documentary, featuring a stylized silent commentary by painter Martiros Saryan, also featured Vartanov's friends, the dissident artists Minas Avetisyan and Sergei Parajanov. The film was censored in the Soviet Union; leading up to Avetisyan's assassination and Parajanov's imprisonment shortly after.

== Friendship with Sergei Parajanov and the blacklist ==
Mikhail Vartanov had a close relationship with imprisoned director Sergei Parajanov. He was first acquainted with Parajanov's work in 1964, having watched the latter's film Shadows of Forgotten Ancestors and the test footage of the unfinished Kiev Frescoes as a student at Moscow’s Gerasimov Institute of Cinematography. Their lifelong friendship began after they met for the first time in 1967, in Armenia, and discussed the screenplay of The Color of Pomegranates (also known as Sayat Nova).

Vartanov's next film Autumn Pastoral—written by Artavazd Peleshyan and scored by composer Tigran Mansurian—was shelved. After Sergei Parajanov was arrested in Kiev in 1973, Vartanov immediately protested to the Prosecutor General of Ukraine. The recently declassified document proved that it was that letter in support of Parajanov that prompted the intensified harassment that Vartanov endured, and his subsequent firing from the Armenfilm Studios 4 months after Paradjanov's imprisonment. In a letter from prison, Parajanov wrote to Vartanov: "You and your purity are colliding with circumstances and predators… That's life."

== Cinematographer ==
Peleshyan and Gennadi Melkonian petitioned the Soviet Russian and Armenian authorities to work with Vartanov, who was by this time blacklisted and unemployed, and he was eventually allowed to participate as a cinematographer in two essay films: The Seasons (also translated as The Seasons of the Year, 1975) and The Mulberry Tree (1979).

== Essayist ==
After a 9-year absence from directing, Vartanov was asked to save a troubled project, The Roots (1983) which he later wrote was "the best film made in Armenia that year." During this period he also worked as a university professor of cinema and photography, while publishing his writings. They appeared in several languages, including French, in Cahiers du cinéma.

== Later career and death ==
For over 20 years, Vartanov's films had been largely suppressed, unmentioned by press, or blocked from submission to foreign film festivals. In a letter to the imprisoned Parajanov, Vartanov wrote, quoting his favorite poet Boris Pasternak: "the time will come and the power of meanness and malice would be overcome by the spirit of kindness." Parajanov responded to Vartanov: "Dear Misha, I received your amazing letter... Never have you been more accurate in evaluating the world and expressing yourself...".

Mikhail Vartanov's last documentary trilogy consisted of The Color of Armenian Land (1969), Minas: A Requiem (1989), and the influential film Parajanov: The Last Spring (1992).

Vartanov died in Hollywood on December 29, 2009.

== Legacy ==
Parajanov-Vartanov Institute was established in Hollywood in 2010 to study, preserve and promote the artistic legacies of Sergei Parajanov and Mikhail Vartanov.

== Quotes ==
"In our land, the government manufactures the biography of the Artist. It honors and awards one, for nothing, and it dishonors and imprisons the other -- a wise government -- it desires to turn both into obedient slaves."

"Probably, besides the film language suggested by Griffith and Eisenstein, the world cinema has not discovered anything revolutionarily new until the 'Color of Pomegranates,' not counting the generally unaccepted language of the 'Andalusian Dog' by Bunuel."

== Quotes about Vartanov ==
- "Vartanov's film Parajanov: The Last Spring [...] exemplifies the power of art over any limitations." (Francis Ford Coppola)
- "Vartanov [...] Brother and friend in arts and in soil... Dear, beloved, rare and wonderful. Perhaps, you're the only friend, who compels me to live... You possess everything an artist needs -- mind, kindness, principles, freedom. Create... That's your mission." (Sergei Parajanov, 1974)
- "Vartanov's fascinating document Parajanov: The Last Spring...is an important and alluring film for all those who love the form of cinema..." Jim Jarmusch
- "Vartanov - the Eyemoman [...]" (William Saroyan, 1978)
- "My dear friend [...] If you like the screenplay (Desert), together we could make a masterpiece [...]" (Artavazd Peleshyan, 1980s)
- "On January 9, came Vartanov [...] Parajanov's most devoted man [...] an amazing man [...] gave an amazing speech [...]" (Gayane Khachatryan, 1990)
- "Vartanov's film [...] Excited and filled me with strength [...]" (Tonino Guerra, 1993)
- "Vartanov was an amazing intellectual, perhaps one of the last [...]" (Yuri Mechitov, 2010)
- "Misha Vartanov [...] One of the most principled and righteous men I have ever met [...]" (Roman Balayan, 2010)
- "We have to ensure that the work of seminal artists like Mikhail Vartanov is preserved, promoted and accessible to the widest possible audience. His films, made against all odds and under the harshest conditions, are crucial to the important heritage of world cinema." (Agnieszka Holland)
- "Vartanov made a wonderful film Parajanov: The Last Spring [...]" (Martin Scorsese)

== Awards and honors ==
- Golden Antelope Award (for diploma film, The Monologue of the Mask) Dakar, 1965.
- Cinematographer of the Year (for The Song of Eternity), USSR Film Festival, 1973
- Russian Academy of Cinema Arts Award (for Parajanov: The Last Spring), Moscow, 1993
- Golden Gate Award (for Parajanov: The Last Spring), San Francisco International Film Festival, 1995
- Golden Palm Award (for Parajanov: The Last Spring), Beverly Hills Film Festival, 2003
- A film retrospective and an art exhibition, Busan International Film Festival, Korea, 2012
- A film retrospective at the Copenhagen Cinematheque, Denmark, 2020
- A film retrospective at the Oslo Cinematheque, Norway, 2024

== Filmography ==
Year	English title	Original title	Romanization	Notes
1969	The Color of Armenian Land	(in Russian) Цвет Армянской Земли	Tsvet armyanskoy zemli	Banned debut film. Behind the scenes of Sergei Paradjanov's Color of Pomegrantes. Documentary trilogy, part I.
1971	Autumn Pastoral	(in Russian) Осенчяя пастораль	Osenn'yaya pastoral'	Written by Artavazd Peleshian. Shelved.
1972	And So Every Day	(in Russian) И так каждый день	I tak kazhdiy dyen'	Scored by Tigran Mansurian. Vartanov narrates for the first time. Black & white. Shelved.
1974	Kadjaran	(in Russian) Каджаран	Kajaran'	Unfinished. Vartanov fired.
1975 (cinematographer)	Seasons of the Year	(in Russian) Bремена Года	Vremena Goda'	Directed by Artavazd Peleshian, lensed by Vartanov.
1979 (cinematographer)	The Mulberry Tree	(in Russian) Шелковица	Shelkovitsa'	Directed by Gennadi Melkonian, lensed by Vartanov.
1984	Roots	(in Russian) Корни	Korni'	First directing work in 10 years. A project deemed unfilmable by all filmmakers at Armenfilm (Armenia)
1987	Erased Faces	(in Armenian) Ջնջվաց դեմքեր	Jenjevatz demker'	
1989	Minas: A Requiem	(in Armenian) Մինաս. ռեկվիէմ	Minas. rekviem'	Documentary trilogy, part II
1992	Paradjanov: The Last Spring	(in English) Parajanov: The Confession		Documentary trilogy, part III

== Selected bibliography ==
=== English language sources ===
- Dixon, Wheeler & Foster, Gwendolyn. "A Short History of Film." New Brunswick, NJ: Rutgers University Press, 2008. ISBN 9780813542690
- Rollberg, Peter. "Historical Dictionary of Russian and Soviet Cinema." Scarecrow Press, 2008. ISBN 9780810860728
- Schneider, Steven Jay. "501 Movie Directors." London: Hachette/Cassell, 2007. ISBN 9781844035731
- "Francis Ford Coppola Recognizes…" Hollywood Reporter (20 October 2015)
- Thomas, Kevin. "Intoxicating spirit." "Los Angeles Times" (1 January 2004)
- Kaplan, Ilyse. "Beverly Hills Film Festival." Variety, (7 April 2011)

=== Foreign language sources ===
- Abramov, G. "Ancient art, alive forever" Pravda newspaper, Moscow, 20 April 1966
- "Il Cinema Delle Repubbliche Transcaucasiche Sovietiche." Venice, Italy: Marsilio Editori, 1986. (Italian language) ISBN 8831748947
- "Les Cimes du Monde." Cahiers du Cinéma" no. 381 (1986), 42-47 (French language) ISSN 0757-8075
- Krukova, A. "Russian Oscars were awarded in Moscow" Independent Newspaper, Moscow, 21 December 1992
- Badasian, V. " "Approaching spirituality" Republic of Armenia newspaper, 25 June 1993
- Perreault, Luc. "Paradjanov - The Last Spring" La Presse, a12, 14 Juin 1994 (French language)
- Tremblay, Odile. "L'empire du pape du pop" Le Devoir, b8, 14 Juin 1994 (French language)
- Stolina, G. "Larger than legends" Panorama newspaper, Hollywood, 14 January 2004
- Egiazarian, R. "Mishel Vartanov from former USSR" Novoye Vremya newspaper, Yerevan, 4 June 2005
- "Director Martin Scorsese accepts 2014 Parajanov-Vartanov Institute Award" California Courier, Los Angeles, p1, 13 October 2014
- Schneider, Steven Jay. "501 Directores de Cine." Barcelona, Spain: Grijalbo, 2008. (Spanish language) ISBN 9788425342646
