= Sergei Parajanov =

Soviet filmmaker (1924–1990)

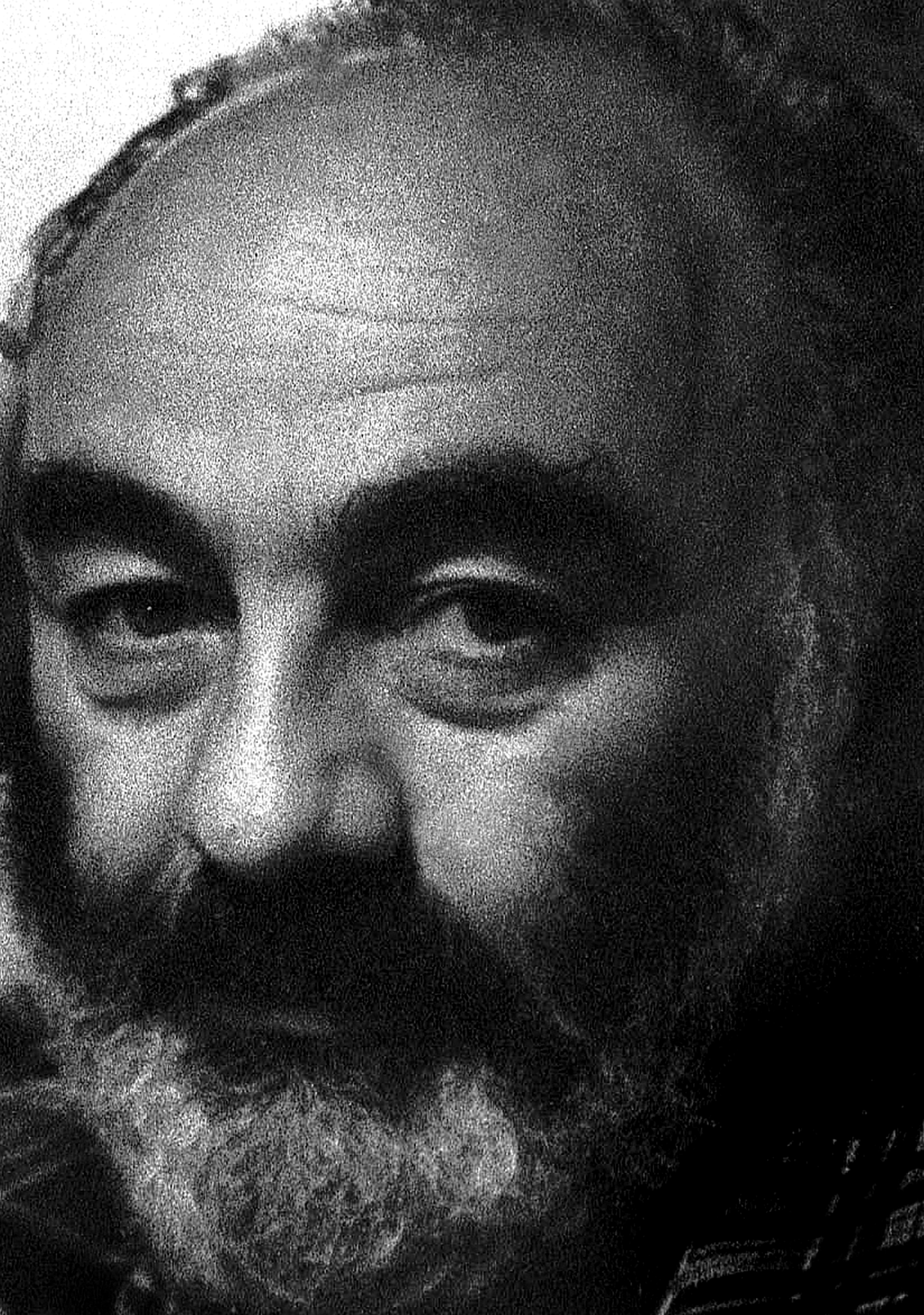
- Parajanov in 1978
- Born: Sergei Iosifovich Parajanov; January 9, 1924; Tiflis, Georgian SSR, Soviet Union
- Died: July 20, 1990 (aged 66); Yerevan, Armenian SSR, Soviet Union
- Resting place: Komitas Pantheon, Yerevan, Armenia
- Occupations: Film director; screenwriter
- Years active: 1951–1990
- Spouses: Nigyar Kerimova (m. 1950–1951); Svetlana Shcherbatiuk (m. 1956–1962)
- Children: 1
- Website: www.parajanov.com

Sergei Iosifovich Parajanov (Note: Armenian: Սերգեյ Հովսեփի Փարաջանով; Russian: Сергей Иосифович Параджанов; Georgian: სერგო ფარაჯანოვი, romanized: sergo parajanovi; Ukrainian: Сергій Йосипович Параджанов; His last name is sometimes transliterated as Paradzhanov or Paradjanov. Parajanov's Armenian family name, Parajaniants, has been attested by a surviving historical document at the Sergei Parajanov Museum.) (January 9, 1924 – July 20, 1990) was a Soviet film director and screenwriter. His films are known for their poetic, non-linear, and symbolic nature. Widely considered by filmmakers, film critics, and film historians to be one of the greatest and most influential filmmakers of all time, he has been described as a "magician", a "master", and a "conjurer of cinematic worlds".

Parajanov was born into an Armenian family in Tiflis, Georgian SSR. He studied at the All-Union State Institute of Cinematography under the tutelage of Ukrainian filmmakers Igor Savchenko and Oleksandr Dovzhenko, and began his career as professional film director in 1954. He became increasingly disenchanted of his films as well as the state-sanctioned art style of socialist realism, prominent throughout the Soviet Union. The film Shadows of Forgotten Ancestors (1965), Parajanov's first major work which diverged from socialist realism, gave him international acclaim. He would later disown and proclaim his films made before 1965 as "garbage". Parajanov's subsequent film, The Color of Pomegranates (1969), was met with widespread acclaim among filmmakers and is often considered one of the greatest films ever made.

Soviet authorities claimed Parajanov was bisexual, which exposed him to increased legal scrutiny over his personal life, films, and political involvement surrounding Ukrainian nationalism. Nearly all of Parajanov's film projects from 1965 to 1973 were banned by the Soviet film administrations, many without discussion.

== Biography ==
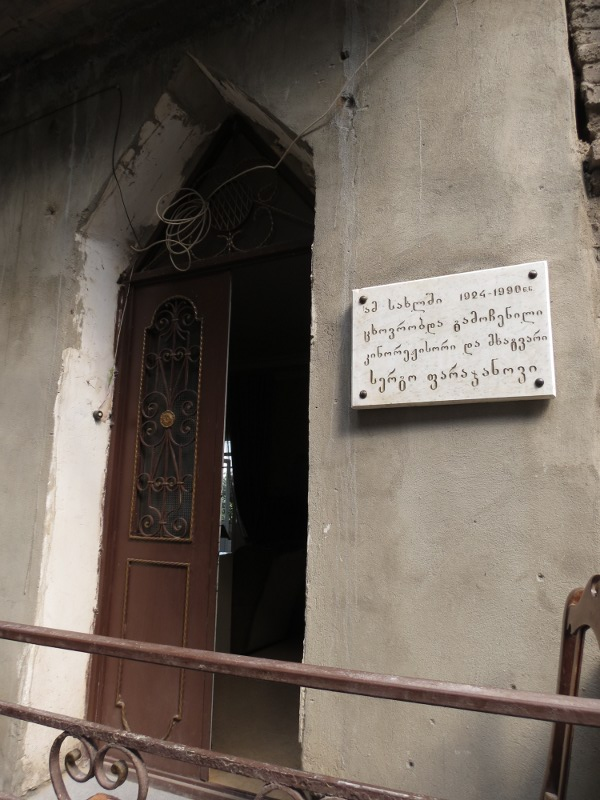
Parajanov's childhood house in Tbilisi

Sergei Iosifovich Parajanov was born to artistically inclined Armenian parents Iosif Parajanov and Siranush Bejanova on January 9, 1924, in Tiflis, now known as Tbilisi, then the capital of the Georgian SSR, Soviet Union. Iosif was a merchant who owned an antique shop, trading jewelry and valuables. Due to the Soviet Union's ban on financial speculation, Iosif's business was frequently subjected to arbitrary searches by the authorities, who often raided his business and seized many of his valuables. Because it was impossible for Iosif to get his trading business legalised, a young Parajanov was often forced to swallow small jewelry pieces and defecate them once authorities withdrew from their search. Parajanov attended a local railway college before running away to attend the Tbilisi State Conservatoire. In 1945, he was transferred to the Moscow Conservatory, where he studied alongside soprano Nina Dorliak. Parajanov left the conservatory to enroll at the directing department at the All-Union State Institute of Cinematography; he studied under the tutelage of Ukrainian filmmakers Igor Savchenko and Alexander Dovzhenko.

Soviet authorities accused Parajanov of being bisexual. In 1948, he was arrested and charged with illegal homosexual acts with MGB officer Nikolai Mikava in Tbilisi. He was sentenced to five years in prison and released under an amnesty after three months. In video interviews, friends and relatives contest the truthfulness of the charges against Parajanov; they believe his sentencing was procured through a kangaroo court as a retaliation for his rebellious political views.

In 1950, Parajanov married Nigyar Kerimova, who came from a Muslim Tatar family, in Moscow. Nigyar's relatives, who disapproved of the marriage, murdered her after she converted to Eastern Orthodox Christianity. Parajanov subsequently moved to Kiev, where he produced a few Russian- and Ukrainian-language documentaries (Dumka, Golden Hands, Natalia Uzhvy), and a handful of narrative films: Andriesh, The Top Guy, Ukrainian Rhapsody, and Flower on the Stone. He became fluent in Ukrainian and married Svitlana Ivanivna Shcherbatiuk (1938–2020) in 1956. The couple had a son named Suran (1958–2021).

In a 1988 interview, Parajanov stated, "Everyone knows that I have three motherlands. I was born in Georgia, worked in Ukraine and I'm going to die in Armenia."

=== Break from Socialist Realism ===
Andrei Tarkovsky's first film, Ivan's Childhood, had an enormous impact on Parajanov's self-discovery as a filmmaker. Later the influence became mutual, and he and Tarkovsky became close friends. Another influence was Italian filmmaker Pier Paolo Pasolini, whom Parajanov would later describe as "like a God" to him and a director of "majestic style". In 1965 Parajanov abandoned socialist realism and directed the poetic Shadows of Forgotten Ancestors, his first film over which he had complete creative control. It won numerous international awards and was well received by Soviet authorities, who praised the film for "conveying the poetic quality and philosophical depth of Mykhailo Kotsiubynsky’s tale through the language of cinema," and called it "a brilliant creative success of the Dovzhenko film studio." Authorities allowed the release of the film with its original Ukrainian soundtrack intact, rather than redubbing the dialogue into Russian for Soviet-wide release, in order to preserve its Ukrainian integrity. (Russian dubbing was standard practice at that time for non-Russian Soviet films when they were distributed outside the republic of origin.)

In 1969, Parajanov moved to Armenia to work on his next film; this was the first time he had visited the country and instilled in him the influence to direct Sayat Nova. It was shot under relatively poor conditions and had a very small budget. Unlike Shadows of Forgotten Ancestors, Sayat Nova was not well received by the authorities, who were quick to intervene, and ban the film for its allegedly inflammatory content and lack of socialist realism. Parajanov re-edited the film and renamed it The Color of Pomegranates.

=== Imprisonment, career hiatus, and other artistic ambitions ===
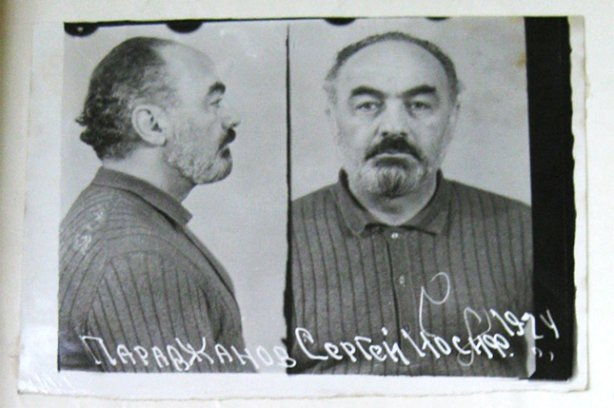
Mugshot of Parajanov

Since the early 1960s, Parajanov had increasingly become the subject of attention by the KGB, for a variety of political activities related to his affinity towards Ukrainian nationalism. He was an active protester following the 1965–1966 Ukrainian purge. In 1969, a report by the Committee for State Security to the Central Committee of the Ukrainian Communist party indicated their belief that Parajanov was a negative influence on his younger colleagues, as well as a key purveyor of ideologically harmful opinion. He was also deemed as someone with a desire to defect if he were to travel abroad.

In December 1973, Parajanov was arrested in Kiev and was accused of homosexuality, sodomy, and propagation of pornography. He was sentenced to five years in a hard labour camp. Three days before Parajanov was due to be sentenced, Tarkovsky wrote a letter to the Central Committee, asserting that "In the last ten years Sergei Parajanov has made only two films: Shadows of Our Forgotten Ancestors and The Colour of Pomegranates. They have influenced cinema first in Ukraine, second in this country as a whole, and third in the world at large. Artistically, there are few people in the entire world who could replace Parajanov. He is guilty – guilty of his solitude. We are guilty of not thinking of him daily and of failing to discover the significance of a master." An eclectic group of artists, actors, filmmakers and activists protested on behalf of Parajanov, calling for his immediate release. Among them were Tarkovsky, Pasolini, Robert De Niro, Francis Ford Coppola, Martin Scorsese, Leonid Gaidai, Eldar Ryazanov, Yves Saint Laurent, Marcello Mastroianni, Françoise Sagan, Heinrich Böll, Louis Aragon, Jean-Luc Godard, François Truffaut, Luis Buñuel, Federico Fellini, Ingmar Bergman, Roberto Rossellini, Luchino Visconti, Michelangelo Antonioni, and Mikhail Vartanov.

Because of his homosexuality, he had very low status among the inmates, and was beaten. Nevertheless, he soon gained respect from others:

As word got around the camp, one of the counts in that very indictment allegedly read: "Film director Sergei Parajanov raped a member of the Communist Party." A distinguished delegation of influential inmates paid Parajanov a visit and offered him assurances of their deep respect, phrased as follows: "We only ever screwed the commies with words — but you did it for real!" Inspired by this recognition, Parajanov soon turned this into a whole epic: he claimed that he'd spent his entire life taking revenge on the Bolsheviks and had personally raped three hundred members of the Communist Party.

Parajanov served four years out of his five-year sentence, and later credited his early release to the efforts made by Aragon, Elsa Triolet, and John Updike. Parajanov's early release was authorized by Soviet leader Leonid Brezhnev, presumably as a result of the latter's meeting with Aragon and Triolet at the Bolshoi Theatre in Moscow. When asked by Brezhnev if he could be of any assistance, Aragon requested the release of Parajanov, which was finalized by December 1977.

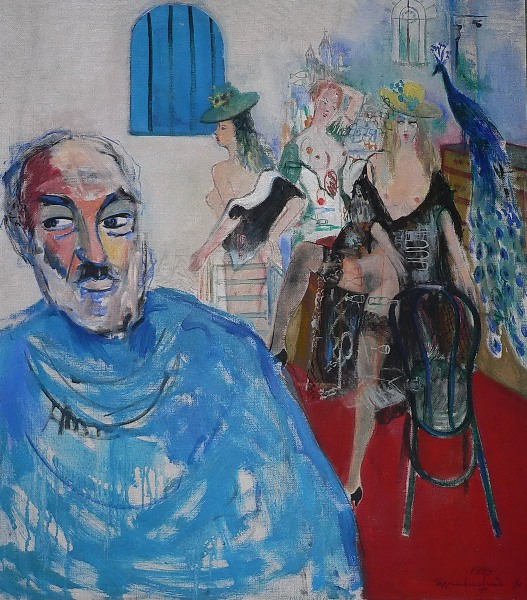
Parajanov Oil on Canvas 1994

While he was incarcerated, Parajanov produced a large number of miniature doll-like sculptures (some of which were lost) and some 800 drawings and collages, many of which were later displayed at the Sergei Parajanov Museum in Yerevan, Armenia, where they are now permanently located. His efforts in the camp were repeatedly compromised by prison guards, who deprived him of materials and called him mad, their cruelty only subsiding after a statement from Moscow admitting that "the director is very talented." After his return from prison to Tbilisi, the close watch of Soviet authorities prevented Parajanov from continuing his cinematic pursuits and compelled him towards other artistic outlets he had nurtured during his time in prison. He crafted extraordinarily intricate collages, created a large collection of abstract drawings and pursued numerous other avenues of non-cinematic art, sewing more dolls and some whimsical suits.

In February 1982, Parajanov was once again arrested on charges of bribery, which happened to coincide with his return to Moscow for the premiere of a play commemorating Vladimir Vysotsky at the Taganka Theatre. He was released in less than a year, with his health seriously weakened.

=== Short return to cinema ===
In 1985, the slow thaw within the Soviet Union spurred Parajanov to resume his passion for cinema. With the encouragement of various Georgian intellectuals, he directed the multi-award-winning film The Legend of Suram Fortress, along with Dodo Abashidze, based on a novella by Daniel Chonkadze. This was his first return to cinema since Sayat-Nova fifteen years earlier.

In 1988, Parajanov and Abashidze directed Ashik Kerib, based on a story by Mikhail Lermontov. It is the story of a wandering minstrel, set in the Azerbaijani culture. Parajanov dedicated the film to Tarkovsky and "to all the children of the world".

=== Death ===
Parajanov died of lung cancer in Yerevan on July 20, 1990, aged 66. His final work, The Confession, was left unfinished. It survives in its original negative as Parajanov: The Last Spring, created by Vartanov in 1992. Fellini, Mastroianni, Tonino Guerra, Francesco Rosi, Alberto Moravia, Giulietta Masina and Bernardo Bertolucci were among those who publicly mourned his death. They sent a telegram to Russia with the following statement: "The world of cinema has lost a magician. Parajanov’s fantasy will forever fascinate and bring joy to the people of the world…”.

== Legacy ==
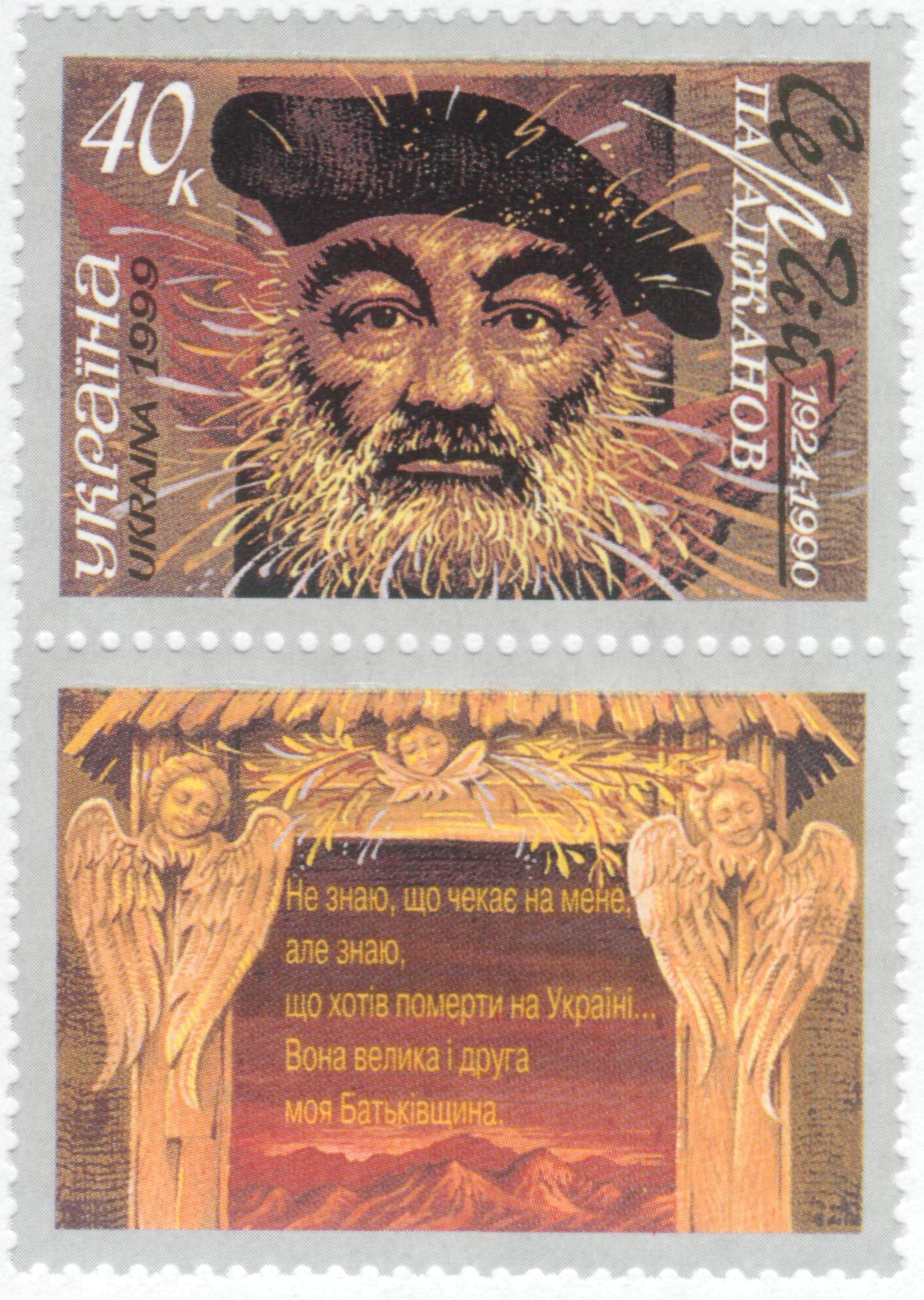
Parajanov on a 1999 stamp of Ukraine

Parajanov's films are ranked among the greatest films of all time by Sight & Sound. He won prizes at Mar del Plata Film Festival, Istanbul International Film Festival, Nika Awards, Rotterdam International Film Festival, Sitges - Catalan International Film Festival, São Paulo International Film Festival and others. A comprehensive retrospective in the UK took place in 2010 at BFI Southbank. The retrospective was curated by Layla Alexander-Garrett and the Parajanov specialist Elisabetta Fabrizi who commissioned a Parajanov inspired new commission in the BFI Gallery by the contemporary artist Matt Collishaw ('Retrospectre'). A symposium was dedicated to Parajanov's work, bringing together experts to discuss and celebrate the director's contribution to cinema and art.

Parajanov was highly appreciated by Andrei Tarkovsky himself in the biographical film "Voyage in Time" ("Always with huge gratitude and pleasure I remember the films of Sergei Parajanov, which I love very much. His way of thinking, his paradoxical, poetical... ability to love beauty and the ability to be absolutely free within his own vision"). In the same film Tarkovsky stated that Parajanov is one of his favorite filmmakers.

Italian filmmaker Michelangelo Antonioni stated that “The Color of Pomegranates by Parajanov, in my opinion one of the best contemporary film directors, strikes with its perfection of beauty.” Parajanov was also admired by the American filmmaker Francis Ford Coppola. French film director Jean-Luc Godard also stated that "In the temple of cinema, there are images, light, and reality. Sergei Parajanov was the master of that temple".

Despite having many admirers of his art, his vision did not attract many followers. "Whoever tries to imitate me is lost", he reportedly said. However, directors such as Theo Angelopoulos, Béla Tarr and Mohsen Makhmalbaf share Parajanov's approach to film as a primarily visual medium rather than as a narrative tool.

The Parajanov-Vartanov Institute was established in Hollywood in 2010 to study, preserve and promote the artistic legacies of Sergei Parajanov and Mikhail Vartanov.

In 2024, marking the 100th anniversary of Parajanov's birth, Ukrainian film maker Taras Tomenko made the documentary "A Sentimental Journey to the Parajanov Planet". The film premiered internationally at the 40th Warsaw Film Festival where it won the 3rd place in the Audience Award for documentary films.

=== References in popular culture ===
- Parajanov's life story provides (quite loosely) the basis for the 2006 novel Stet by the American author James Chapman.
- Lady Gaga's video for "911" visually references The Color of Pomegranates through much of the video. The film poster also appears on the street scene at the end of the video. Gaga's video presents the film's symbols in her own allegory of pain.
- Madonna's 1995 music video Bedtime Story restages some of the content from the movie (such as the scene of a young child lying in a fetal position on a pentagram on the floor while an adult covers it with a blanket, and another where a naked foot crushes a bunch of grapes lying on an enscribed tablet), among other artistic inspiration depicting dreams and surrealist artwork in the video.
- Without permission Nicolas Jaar released, in 2015, the album Pomegranates, intended as an alternative soundtrack for The Color of Pomegranates and was asked by the Parajanov-Vartanov Institute to cancel the performance in Los Angeles.
- The Color of Pomegranates also influenced the alternative rock group R.E.M.'s music video for "Losing My Religion".

== Filmography ==
Year	English title	Original title	Romanization	Notes
1951	Moldavian Tale	In Russian: Молдавская сказка In Ukrainian: Moлдавська байка	Moldavskaya skazka Moldavska baika	Graduate short film; lost
1954	Andriesh	In Russian: Андриеш	Andriesh	Co-directed with Yakov Bazelyan; feature-length remake of Moldavian Tale
1958	Dumka	In Ukrainian: Думка	Dumka	Documentary
1958	The First Lad (aka The Top Guy)	In Russian: Первый парень In Ukrainian: Перший пapyбок	Pervyj paren Pershyi parubok	
1959	Natalya Ushvij	In Russian: Наталия Ужвий	Natalia Uzhvij	Documentary
1960	Golden Hands	In Russian: Золотые руки	Zolotye ruki	Documentary
1961	Ukrainian Rhapsody	In Russian: Украинская рапсодия In Ukrainian: Укpaїнськa рaпсодія	Ukrainskaya rapsodiya Ukrainska rapsodiya	
1962	Flower on the Stone	In Russian: Цветок на камне In Ukrainian: Квітка на камені	Tsvetok na kamne Kvitka na kameni	Co-directed with Anatoly Slesarenko
1965	Shadows of Forgotten Ancestors	In Ukrainian: Тіні забутих предків	Tini zabutykh predkiv	
1965	Kyiv Frescoes	In Ukrainian: Київські фрески In Russian: Киевские фрески	Kyivski fresky Kievskie freski	Banned during pre-production; 15 minutes of auditions survive
1967	Hakob Hovnatanian	In Armenian: Հակոբ Հովնաթանյան	Hakob Hovnatanyan	Short film portrait of the 19th century Armenian artist Hakob Hovnatanyan
1968	Children to Komitas	In Armenian: Երեխաներ Կոմիտասին	Yerekhaner Komitasin	Documentary for UNICEF; lost
1969	The Color of Pomegranates	In Armenian: Նռան գույնը	Nran guyne	Originally titled Sayat-Nova
1985	The Legend of Suram Fortress	In Georgian: ამბავი სურამის ციხისა	Ambavi Suramis tsikhisa	
1985	Arabesques on the Pirosmani Theme	In Georgian: არაბესკები ფიროსმანის თემაზე In Russian: Арабески на тему Пиросмани	Arabeskebi Pirosmanis temaze Arabeski na temu Pirosmani	Short film portrait of the Georgian painter Niko Pirosmani
1988	Ashik Kerib	In Georgian: აშიკი ქერიბი In Azerbaijani: Aşıq Qərib	Ashiki Keribi	
1989–1990	The Confession	In Armenian: Խոստովանանք	Khostovanank	Unfinished; original negative survives in Mikhail Vartanov's Parajanov: The Last Spring

== Screenplays ==
=== Partially produced screenplays ===
- Shadows of Forgotten Ancestors (Тіні забутих предків, 1965, co-written with Ivan Chendei, based on the novelette by Mykhailo Kotsiubynsky)
- Kyiv Frescoes (Київські фрески, 1965)
- Sayat Nova (Саят-Нова, 1969, original production screenplay of The Color of Pomegranates)
- The Confession (сповідь, 1969–1989)
- Studies About Vrubel (Этюды о Врубеле, 1989, depiction of Mikhail Vrubel's Kyiv period, co-written and directed by Leonid Osyka)
- Swan Lake: The Zone (Лебедине озеро. Зона, 1989, filmed in 1990, directed by Yuriy Illienko, cinematographer of Shadows of Forgotten Ancestors)

=== Unproduced screenplays ===
- The Dormant Palace (Дремлющий дворец, 1969, based on Pushkin's poem The Fountain of Bakhchisaray)
- Intermezzo (1972, based on Mykhailo Kotsiubynsky's short story)
- Icarus (Икар, 1972)
- The Golden Edge (Золотой обрез, 1972)
- Ara the Beautiful (Ара Прекрасный, 1972, based on the poem by 20th century Armenian poet Nairi Zaryan about Ara the Beautiful)
- Demon (Демон, 1972, based on Lermontov's eponymous poem)
- The Miracle of Odense (Чудо в Оденсе, 1973, loosely based on the life and works of Hans Christian Andersen)
- David of Sasun (Давид Сасунский, mid-1980s, based on Armenian epic poem David of Sasun)
- The Martyrdom of Shushanik (Мученичество Шушаник, 1987, based on Georgian chronicle by Iakob Tsurtaveli)
- The Treasures of Mount Ararat (Сокровища у горы Арарат)

Among his projects, there were also plans for adapting Longfellow's The Song of Hiawatha, Shakespeare's Hamlet, Goethe's Faust, and the Old East Slavic poem The Tale of Igor's Campaign, but the film scripts for these were never completed.

== Awards and recognition ==
- There is a statue of Parajanov in Tbilisi.
- There is a plaque on the wall of Parajanov's childhood home.
- The street where Parajanov grew up, Kote Meskhi street, was renamed Parajanov Street in 2021.
- There is a house museum dedicated to Parajanov in Yerevan, Armenia.
- State Prize of the Armenian SSR (1988)
- Shevchenko National Prize (1991)
- National Legend of Ukraine (2024)

== See also ==
- Art film
- 3963 Paradzhanov
- Cinema of Armenia
- Cinema of Georgia
- Cinema of the Soviet Union
- Cinema of Ukraine
- Parajanov-Vartanov Institute
- Serhii Parajanov Museum
- List of directors associated with art film

== Bibliography ==
Selected bibliography of books and scholarly articles about Sergei Parajanov.

=== English-language sources ===
- Dixon, Wheeler & Foster, Gwendolyn. "A Short History of Film." New Brunswick, NJ: Rutgers University Press, 2008. ISBN 9780813542690
- Cook, David A. "Shadows of Forgotten Ancestors: Film as Religious Art." Post Script 3, no. 3 (1984): 16–23.
- First, Joshua. Sergei Paradjanov: Shadows of Forgotten Ancestors. London and Chicago: Itellect; University of Chicago Press, 2016. ISBN 9781783207091
- Jayamanne, Laleen. Poetic Cinema and the Spirit of the Gift in the Films of Pabst, Parajanov, Kubrick and Ruiz. Amsterdam University Press 2021. ISBN 9789463726245
- Kim, Olga. “Cinema and Painting in Parajanov’s Aesthetic Metamorphoses.” Studies in Russian & Soviet Cinema 12, no. 1 (March 2018): 19–36. doi:10.1080/17503132.2017.1415519.
- Nebesio, Bohdan. "Shadows of Forgotten Ancestors: Storytelling in the Novel and the Film." Literature/Film Quarterly 22, no. 1 (1994): 42–49.
- Oeler, Karla. "A Collective Interior Monologue: Sergei Parajanov and Eisenstein's Joyce-Inspired Vision of Cinema." The Modern Language Review 101, no. 2 (April 2006): 472–487.
- Oeler, Karla. "Nran guyne/The Colour of Pomegranates: Sergo Parajanov, USSR, 1969." In The Cinema of Russia and the Former Soviet Union, 139–148. London, England: Wallflower, 2006. [Book chapter]
- Papazian, Elizabeth A. "Ethnography, Fairytale and ‘Perpetual Motion’ in Sergei Paradjanov's Ashik- Kerib." Literature/Film Quarterly 34, no. 4 (2006): 303–12.
- Paradjanov, Sergei. Seven Visions. Edited by Galia Ackerman. Translated by Guy Bennett. Los Angeles: Green Integer, 1998. ISBN 1892295040, ISBN 9781892295040
- Parajanov, Sergei, and Zaven Sarkisian. Parajanov Kaleidoscope: Drawings, Collages, Assemblages. Yerevan: Sergei Parajanov Museum, 2008. ISBN 9789994121434
- Razlogov, Kirill. “Parajanov in Prison: An Exercise in Transculturalism.” Studies in Russian & Soviet Cinema 12, no. 1 (March 2018): 37–57. doi:10.1080/17503132.2018.1422223.
- Steffen, James. The Cinema of Sergei Parajanov. Madison: University of Wisconsin Press, 2013. ISBN 9780299296544
- Steffen, James, ed. Sergei Parajanov special issue. Armenian Review 47/48, nos. 3–4/1–2 (2001/2002). Double issue; publisher website
- Steffen, James. "Kyiv Frescoes: Sergei Parajanov's Unrealized Film Project." KinoKultura Special Issue 9: Ukrainian Cinema (December 2009), online. URL: KinoKultura
- Schneider, Steven Jay. "501 Movie Directors." London: Hachette/Cassell, 2007. ISBN 9781844035731

=== Non-English sources ===
- Vartanov, Mikhail. "Les Cimes du Monde." Cahiers du Cinéma" no. 381, 1986 (French language) ISSN 0757-8075
- Bullot, Érik. Sayat Nova de Serguei Paradjanov: La face et le profil. Crisnée, Belgium: Éditions Yellow Now, 2007. (French language) ISBN 9782873402129
- Cazals, Patrick. Serguei Paradjanov. Paris: Cahiers du cinéma, 1993. (French language) ISBN 9782866421335,
- Chernenko, Miron. Sergei Paradzhanov: Tvorcheskii portret. Moskva: "Soiuzinformkino" Goskino SSSR, 1989. (Russian language) Online version
- Grigorian, Levon. Paradzhanov. Moscow: Molodaia gvardiia, 2011. (Russian language) ISBN 9785235034389,
- Grigorian, Levon. Tri tsveta odnoi strasti: Triptikh Sergeia Paradzhanova. Moscow: Kinotsentr, 1991. (Russian language)
- Kalantar, Karen. Ocherki o Paradzhanove. Yerevan: Gitutiun NAN RA, 1998. (Russian language)
- Katanian, Vasilii Vasil’evich. Paradzhanov: Tsena vechnogo prazdnika. Nizhnii Novgorod: Dekom, 2001. (Russian language) ISBN 9785895330425
- Liehm, Antonín J., ed. Serghiej Paradjanov: Testimonianze e documenti su l’opera e la vita. Venice: La Biennale di Venezia/Marsilio, 1977. (Italian language)
- Mechitov, Yuri. Sergei Paradzhanov: Khronika dialoga. Tbilisi: GAMS- print, 2009. (Russian language) ISBN 9789941017544
- Paradzhanov, Sergei. Ispoved’. Edited by Kora Tsereteli. St. Petersburg: Azbuka, 2001. (Russian language) ISBN 9785267002929
- Paradzhanov, Sergei, and Garegin Zakoian. Pis'ma iz zony. Yerevan: Fil’madaran, 2000. (Russian language) ISBN 9789993085102
- Simyan, Tigran Sergei Parajanov as a Text: Man, Habitus, and Interior (on the material of visual texts) // ΠΡΑΞΗMΑ. Journal of Visual Semiotics 2019, N 3, pp. 197–215
- Schneider, Steven Jay. "501 Directores de Cine." Barcelona, Spain: Grijalbo, 2008. ISBN 9788425342646
- Tsereteli, Kora, ed. Kollazh na fone avtoportreta: Zhizn'–igra. 2nd ed. Nizhnii Novgorod: Dekom, 2008. (Russian language) ISBN 9785895330975
- Vartanov, Mikhail. "Sergej Paradzanov." In "Il Cinema Delle Repubbliche Transcaucasiche Sovietiche." Venice, Italy: Marsilio Editori, 1986. (Italian language) ISBN 8831748947
