= Chuhaister =

Forest deity in Ukrainian mythology

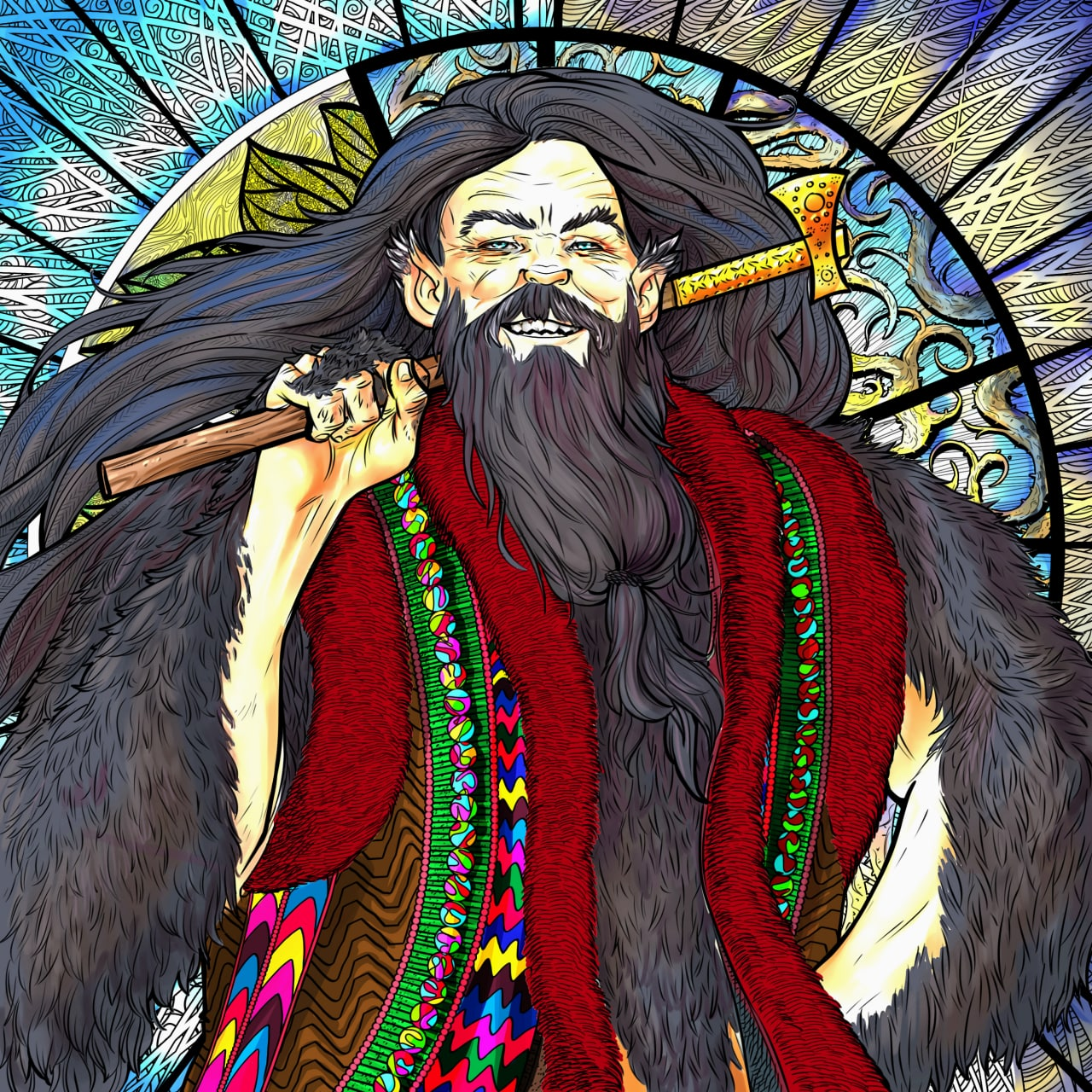

Creature information
- Other name: Чугайстер
- Grouping: Male legendary creatures
- Sub grouping: Fairy; Spirit; Relict hominid
- Folklore: Slavic paganism

Origin
- First attested: In folklore
- Country: Ukraine
- Region: Carpathians

Chuhaister (Ukrainian: Чугайстер) is a Ukrainian tutelary deity of the forests. He is specific to the Carpathians.

== Description ==
According to the legend, Chuhaister was once an ordinary person.

He did something very bad to his neighbor and he cursed him to live in the forest for the rest of his life and not be able to die. Under the power of the curse, Chuhaister left his native home and wandered away. Since then, he wanders alone through the dark dense forests and wild mountain peaks in summer and winter, and no one can harm him – neither man nor beast. Over the years, his clothes have worn out, and Chuhaister now walks around naked. He has long hair and a white beard, his body is covered with white or black fur, so it is very difficult to recognize a person in him. Usually Chuhaister was presented as a giant: healthy, as tall as a spruce – from two to seven meters tall. There are indications that he has blue or frog-like eyes, that he is toothless and lisping, that he has claws on his feet or even hooves. Sometimes Chuhaister was described as dressed in white clothes. There are legends according to which there is only one forest man, or that seven brothers became Chuhaisters, or that there are only three or four Chuhaisters.

He could also be represented as a small spirit that floats in the form of a strong wind or whirlwind and tears down the forest. Wind, rain, thunder, hail and the abnormal movement of the moon in the sky could serve as signs of the presence of the Chuhaister.

== Names and etymology ==
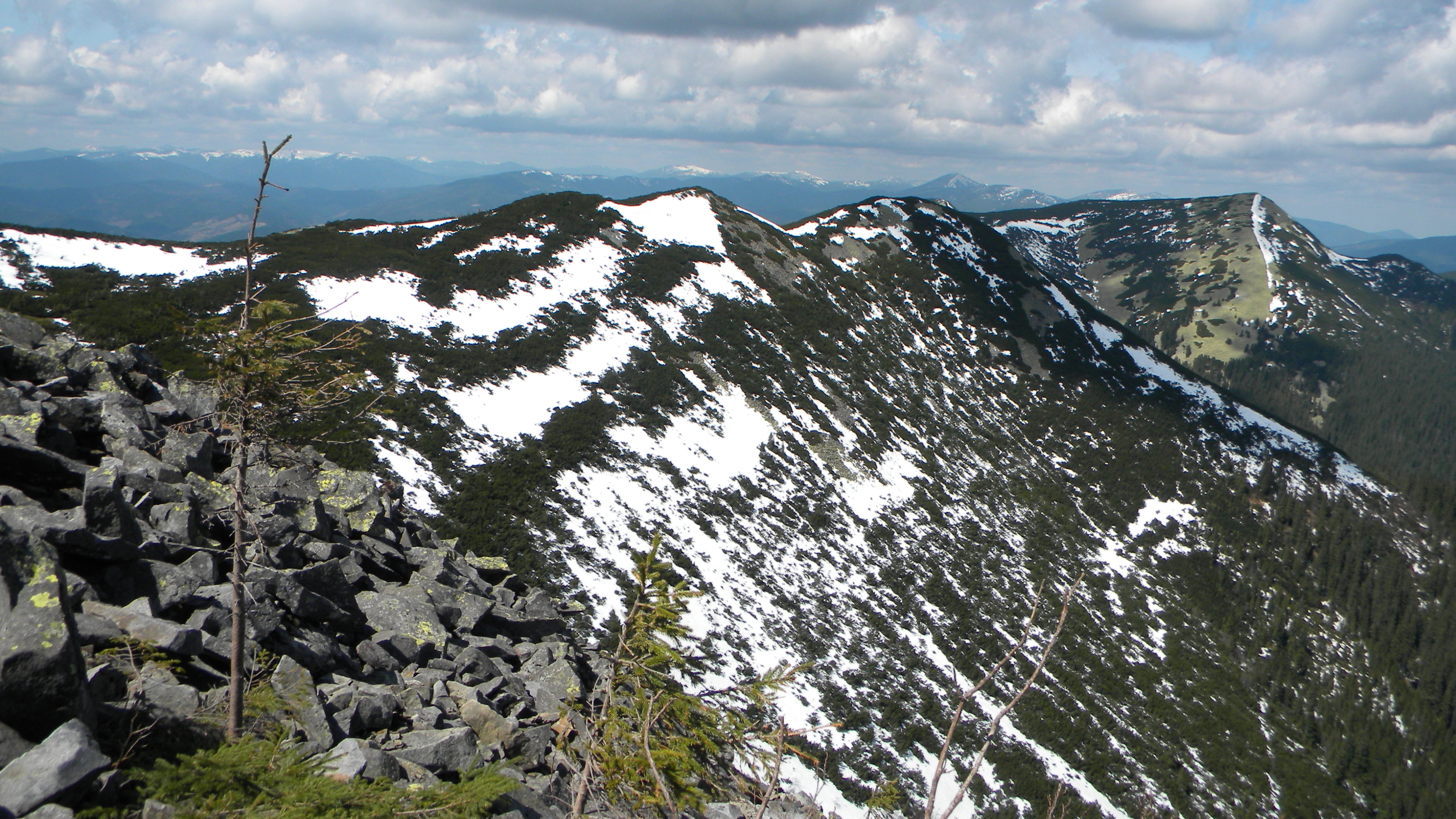
Dovbushanka Ridge

Known by the following names: chugayster, chugaystyr, chugaistryn, ochugayster, chugay, forest man, forest grandfather and simply grandfather (Boykivshchyna), night owl (Transcarpathia), grove (Rakhivshchyna), grandfather. The use of such names as grandfather is probably connected with the taboo against saying the names of demons out loud. Some authors capitalize the name of the character, considering him as an individual.

The most known names for Chuhaister include the following:

- Lisovyi cholovik (Ukrainian: лісовий чоловік) "Forest man"
- Lisovyi did (Ukrainian: лісовий дід) "Forest grandfather/forest old man"
- Nochnyk (Ukrainian: ночник) "Night Person"
- Hai (Ukrainian: гай) "Grove"

There is no reliable etymology of the name, although some modern researchers have connected the first element of the word with the Proto-Slavic root *čuga ("ambush, sentinel"), chuga ("Cossack watchtowers"), Ukrainian chuga (Carpathian national outerwear), chugilo ("flow in the stone"), and a Ukrainian dialect word from the area of Negostina, chuga ("scarecrow"). Maxim Anatolyevich Yuyukin, philologist and author of historical novels, considers that the first part of the word is related to the Proto-Slavic root *čugati meaning "to appear, to stick out, to stand out". The origin of the second part (a)ister remains largely unexplained, although a number of researchers have assumed that it comes from Ukrainian dialect га́йстр, transliterated as haister, meaning stork. There is also the possibility of a completely foreign origin of the word.

The word Chuhaister does not appear in historical monuments. B. V. Kobylansky assumed that the mythological character and his name arose directly in the southwestern dialects of the Ukrainian language in connection with the appearance of forest hermits from Moldavian-Bukovinian monasteries in the 17th–18th centuries.

== Behaviour ==
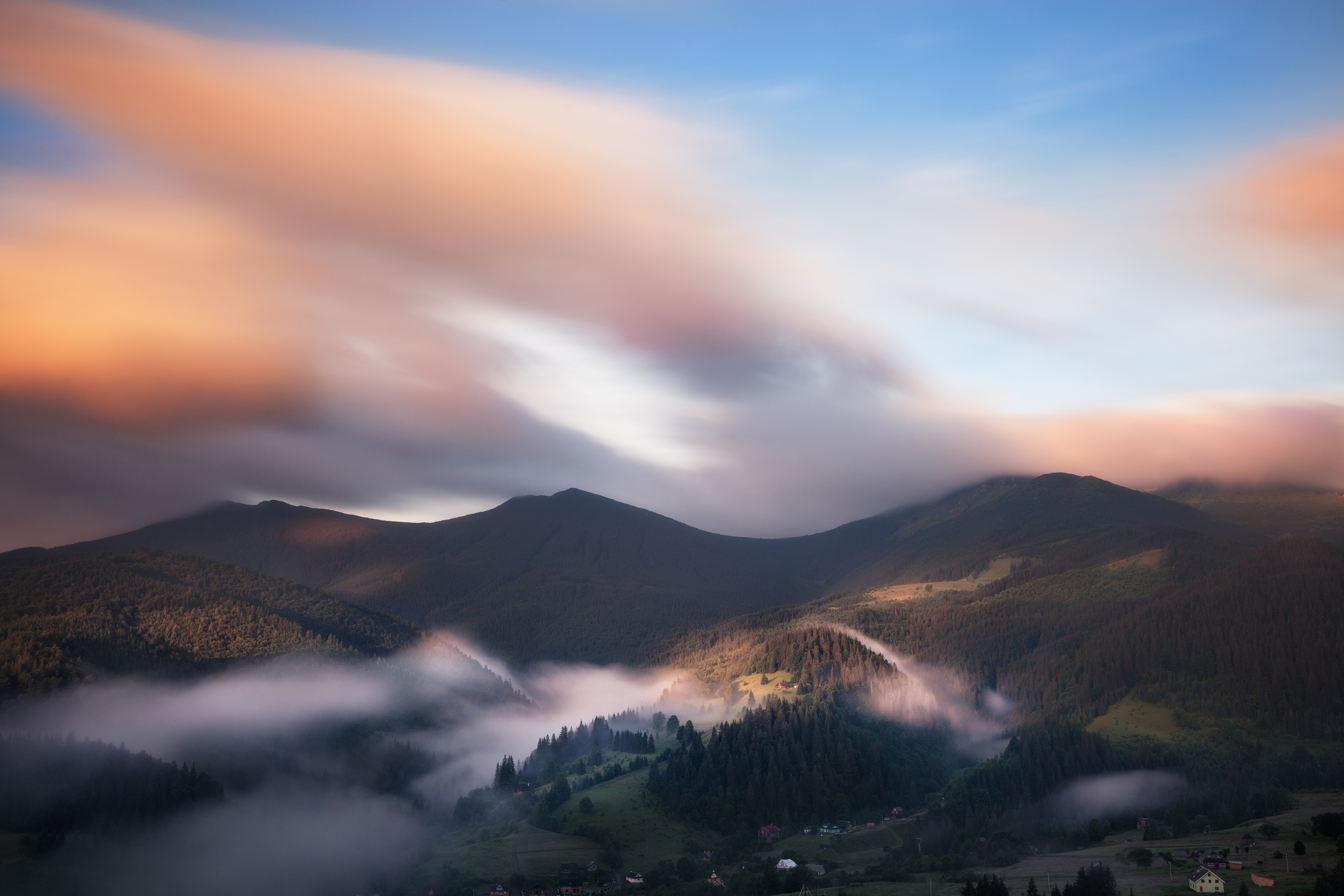
Dzembronia and Smotrych mountains, Carpathian Mountains, Ukraine

For people, Chuhaister was not thought to be dangerous. He would sit by their fire and roast his newly-caught mavka on it.

To make hail, the forest man freezes the lake, then grinds the ice into pieces and lifts them up, carrying them wherever he wants.

According to folk legends, Chuhaister hunts for forest mermaid-like spirits (mavkas), hiding in the foliage and waiting for a victim to appear. Grabbing her, he rips her in half (stepping on one leg and pulling the other), then eats her. Chuhaister rages if its prey tries to run and hide, its booming voice echoing through the howling of the storm in the treetops. Trying to hide, mavkas can run into bedrooms, and ask people to hide them, but Chuhaister will catch them every time. He can appear as a wolf, because they are not afraid of wolves. According to one explanation, he hunts them because they make fun of him, depicting his cry. By hunting them, he prevents the harm they can do to men working in the forest. The function of catching and tearing mavkas in the Carpathians was also attributed to ghouls and wild people.

It was believed that a forest person always lives in the forest, and he does not show himself in the fields and in the villages, because the air there is "not sweet" for him. It is active mainly at night. According to some beliefs, the forest grandfather has his own farm. However, there are no records of his family. Forest animals are at his service, for example, a fox and a wolf go to fetch him water. It was often believed that the Chuhaister had a cheerful disposition and loved to play the flute. It was also said that he runs fast on one leg or that he can tear off his leg and chop wood with it. He sleeps, curled up in a ball, or in a thicket, or in dry leaves and branches, or near a campfire left by people. In the latter case, he can be represented in the form of a snake-like creature, coiled around the fire with a wheel.

Chuhaister helps people in the forest and in the mountains. According to folk beliefs, Chuhaister is friendly to people, he likes talking to them, and warming himself by the fire. Chuhaister has many features which make him similar to the wind. He can appear in the form of a wind or a whirlwind. Like the wind, Chuhaister can climb into a chimney and sing songs there. He dances like a whirlwind, very fast. Chuhaister's dance is disastrous for ordinary people, it is so fast that no shoes can survive it. However, Chuhaister can also reward a good dancer. During the dance, Chuhaister sings in a lisp: "People play and sing with each other, and we are like that, like that!" (Record of S. Pushyk). It is this lisp that makes you think that Chuhaister belongs to otherworldly creatures. Extremely old, sometimes toothless, he may not be able to pronounce all the sounds.

On the other hand, Chuhaister's affection for people, his protective function (destruction of Mavkas) indicates that he may be an ancestor protecting lumberjacks and hunters from captivity. Kulish and banush are offered as a sacrifice to Chuhaister, minding his lack of teeth. It is often said that Chuhaister is "one-legged." He, like Baba Yaga, can tear off his artificial leg – and chop firewood with it. In a Chuhaister's forest, one should not whistle or shout, so as not to summon the Forest Man. All these are the signs of the "lower world" creatures: one-leggedness or lameness, as well as being summoned with a whistle, are their signs.

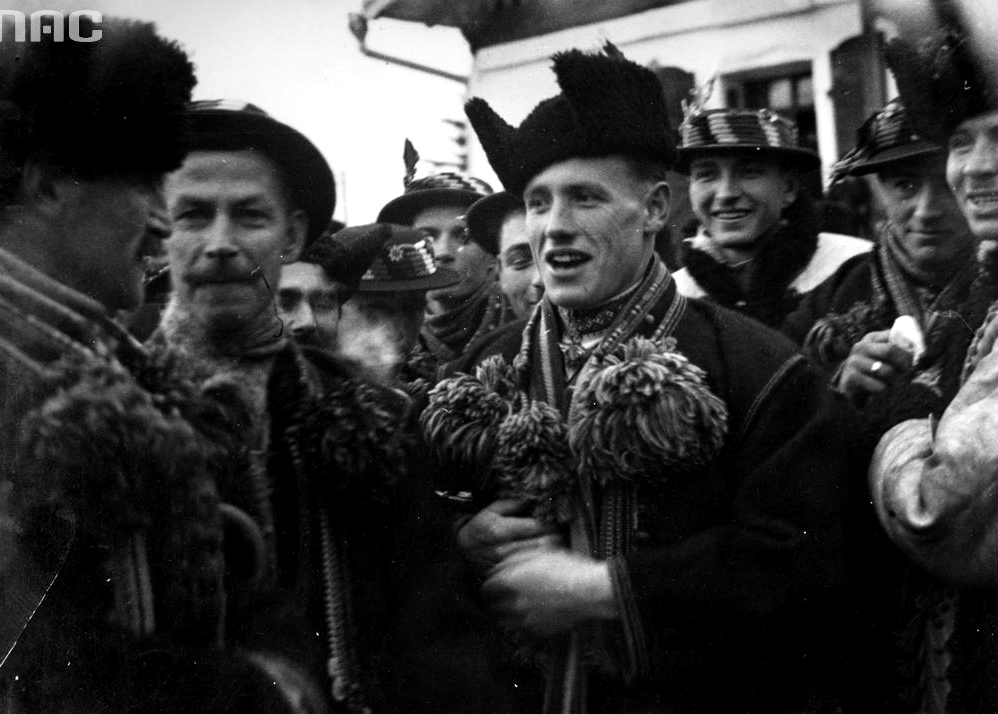
Hutsuls (Ukrainian highlanders of Eastern Carpathian mountains) from Verkhovyna (former Zhabye) district, southern part of Ivano-Frankivsk oblast (province), western Ukraine. Early 1930-s.

It is usually indicated that the Chuhaister is not dangerous for people and even treats them with sympathy, greets them when they meet and urges them not to be afraid of him. He likes to warm himself, talk to someone and smoke his pipe by a manmade fire in the forest, or to roast caught Mavkas on it, having pierced them with a stick like a skewer. In winter, to keep warm, Chuhaister could climb into a chimney and sing to the wind there. One story tells of a shepherd who woke up at night and saw Chuhaister by his fireplace. Being an experienced man, he struck the floor in front of Chuhaister with an ax butt downward, thus gaining power over him, and ordered him to sit on the ax's blade, grabbed him with his little fingers and did not let go until the Chuhaister told him about tomorrow's attack of bears and wolves on the shepherd's herd. In another story, Chuhaister engaged a lumberjack in a frenzied dance, while chanting these word: "People are playing and singing, and we too ourselves are saying this and that, this and that!" Having danced to his heart's content, he let go of the frightened man, who lost his new boots in the dance; while another man could not survive the fast pace of the Chuhaister's dance and either die or be thrown away, for example, into a river.

In the village of Bystrets, Ivano-Frankivsk Oblast, it was believed that Chuhaister grazes his goats and goats of humans on the pastures of еру Gagzhina polonyna. There they also believed that the Chuhaister patronized the masters. Carpathian loggers left Chuhaister as a sacrifice, knowing about his tall stature and toothlessness, with kulish soup and banush porridge. Their disappearance was considered as proof of the arrival of the Chuhaister and their destruction of evil spirits in the cradle. The shepherds turned to the forest man, having first prayed to God that he would not hit the cattle with hail, for this the shepherds put salt with a piece of bread in a cloth at the crossroads.

In another tale, Chuhaister taught a good lesson to a master who had been unfair to his servant by letting a bear attack the master so that he lost all his clothes while running away. Another legend tells about a woman who could not conceive and came to Grandfather Chuhaister for help, so he gave her two daughters, but they could not live separately – one had no hands, and another was blind, so they helped each other out thus symbolizing both mental and physical work. Chuhaister could help a lost person to get out of the forest.

Hutsuls believed that if a forest person sees a fire in a hut at night, he goes straight to it and calls: "Go, go, go!". But it is impossible to answer him, as well as to all spirits, because the answer connects the human world with the world of spirits; the answered forest person can "confuse" (that is, send him a disease) or strangle him. The forest man himself will go into the cradle and check whether there is enough water in the buckets with the sticks that are used to light the fire and stir the kulish. If he likes everything, then he will sit on a stump in front of the fire, saying "Oh, I'll warm up here...", and will ask various questions to sleeping people, for example, "Hey, are you sleeping?", Again, you don't need to answer them. If he doesn't like something, he can start scaring the herd, hitting with hail. If there was no water supply in the house, the Chuhaister could take the child with him (S. G. Pushyk suggests that in order to protect him from a possible fire).

== Cultural references ==
Chuhaister also took his place in works of art based on Ukrainian folklore.

Legends about Chuhaister are known only in the Ukrainian Carpathian Mountains, they are most widespread in the Hutsul region.

There are few folklore records and scientific publications about Chuhaister. At the beginning of the 20th century the writings of V. Y. Shukhevich in his "Hutsulshchyna" (Lviv, 1899–1908) and A. I. Onyshchuk in the work "Materials for Hutsul demonology" (Lviv, 1909) and the mention of V. Hnatyuk in the work "Remains of the pre-Christian religious worldview of our ancestors" (Lviv, 1912), then a couple of articles by I. A. Pankevych in the book "Ukrainian dialects of Pidkarpatska Rus' and neighboring regions" (Prague, 1938). A few more records were published starting from the second half of the 1980s, including S. G. Pushyk in the article "Chuhaister: a mythical character of Carpathian folk poetry" (Kyiv, 1994). Information about the Chugaist can be found in the dictionary "Hutsul Mythology. Ethnolinguistic dictionary" (Lviv, 2002) N. V. Hobzei. The image was popularized by M. M. Kotsiubynsky in "Shadows of Forgotten Ancestors", where the Chugaist is bred as a kind and cheerful inhabitant of the Carpathian forests, a protector of people from mavkas. According to S. G. Pushyk, the original ideas about this mythical character were distorted by narrators, in particular, in children's literature.

== See also ==
- Ochopintre (Republic of Georgia)
- Ukrainian folklore
