= Ukrainians in Italy =

Total population
- 440,000

Languages
- Ukrainian, Russian, Italian

Ukrainians in Italy are mostly recent labor migrants. As of 2020, there were 223,000 Ukrainians in Italy with valid permits. Many Ukrainian women make a living in Italy as caretakers for the elderly, terminally ill, children or entire families. Mistrustful of retirement homes, Italians have embraced Ukrainian migrants as an answer to a shortage of Italian in-home caregivers (making Ukrainians the fourth-largest immigrant community in Italy), a professional role snubbed by many native Italians, due to its physical difficulty and emotional stress.

== History ==
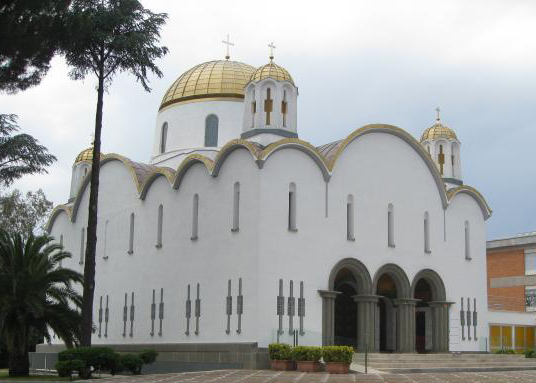
Basilica of Holy Wisdom in Rome, seat of the Ukrainian Catholic exarchate in Italy

Scholar Yuriy Drohobych, who stemmed from today's Western Ukraine, served as the rector of Bologna University during the 15th century. Among notable natives of Ukraine who visited Italy during the 18th and 19th centuries were Hryhoriy Skovoroda, Antin Mohylnytskyi, Yuriy Fedkovych, Panteleimon Kulish, Nikolai Gogol, Mykhailo Kotsiubynskyi, Mykhailo Drahomanov, Lesya Ukrainka, Marko Vovchok etc. Starting from the Union of Brest, Rome has served as a major centre of the Ukrainian Catholic Church.

During the First World War, many ethnic Ukrainian prisoners of war from the Austro-Hungarian Army were kept in Asinara, Monte Cassino and Arquata. In 1919-1920 Ukrainian People's Republic established its diplomatic mission in Italy, headed by Dmytro Antonovych; a separate mission represented the West Ukrainian People's Republic. The mission published a newspaper in Italian. A Ukrainian military mission was also active in the country during that period.

During the Interwar period Italy was the place of residence for a number of Ukrainian political and cultural figures, most notably Yevhen Konovalets. In 1933 a Ukrainian community was founded in Rome. Following the end of World War II, around 15,000 Ukrainians, including soldiers of the Ukrainian National Army, ended up in italy and were cared for by a committee established in Rome by archbishop Ivan Buchko. After 1947, only a small Ukrainian community remained, with its majority consisting of priests and monks residing in Rome, Grottaferrata and Turin.

== Demographics ==
According to a National Institute of Statistics (Istat) report about foreigners in Italy, there were 223,782 Ukrainians in Italy as of 2012, about 80% of them women. With many Ukrainian caregivers believed to be working or residing in Italy illegally, other estimates of their numbers range broadly, from 600,000 to 1 million. And while most Ukrainian immigrants eventually want to come back to Ukraine, some are choosing to stay permanently, becoming a part of the Italian society.

Due to the Russian invasion of Ukraine, 112,098 refugees arrived in Italy from Ukraine as of May, 2022. Of the total, 58,334 are women, 15,256 men and 38,508 minors.

== Religion ==
In the years 2011 and 2012 the ISTAT made a survey regarding the religious affiliation among the immigrants in Italy, the religion of the Ukrainian people in Italy were as follows:

- Christianity: 90.8%, of which Orthodox Christians 68%, Catholics 22.5% and Protestants 0.3%
- Muslims: 0.1%
- Non religious: 5.6%
- Other religions: 3.5%

== Ukrainian-Italian institutions ==
- Amateur theatre "Berehynia"

== See also ==
- Italy–Ukraine relations
- Ukrainian diaspora
- Immigration to Italy

== Sources ==
- Дель Ґаудіо (Del Gaudio), С. 2023. Ukrainian Studies in Italy: present and future developments (Original title: “Україністика в Італії: сучасність і перспективи розвитку”). IV Міжнародна наукова конференція: Актуальні проблеми романо-германської філології. Матеріали міжнародної наукової конференції. Київ: Український державний університет імені Михайла Драгоманова, с.8-12.
