= Shadows of Forgotten Ancestors (novel) =

1911 novel by Ukrainian writer Mykhailo Kotsiubynsky

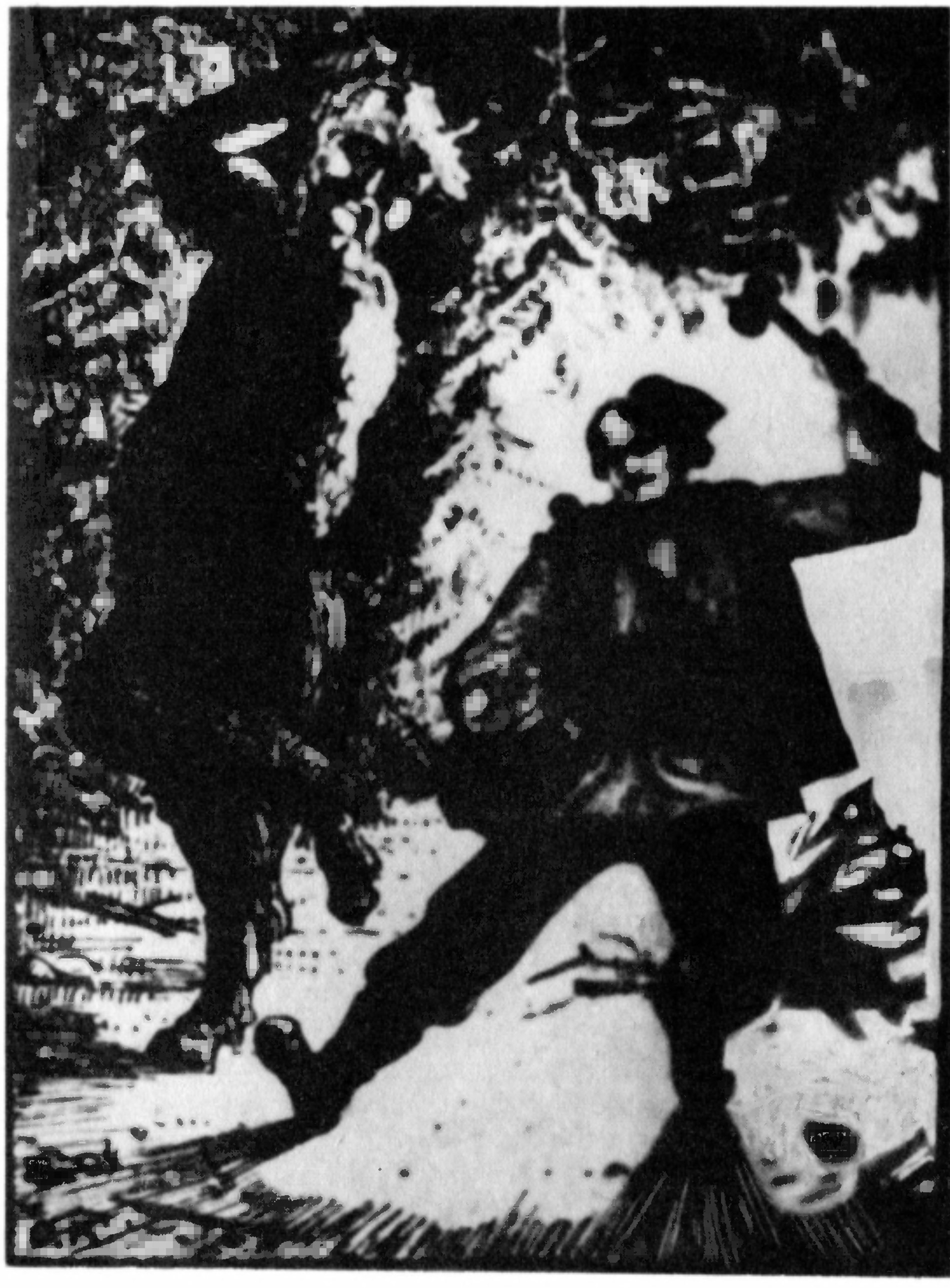
- Ivan's dance with the chuhaister (Note: this and other illustrations are from a 1955 illustrated edition of the novel published in New York City)
- Author: Mykhailo Kotsiubynsky
- Language: Ukrainian
- Genre: Psychological, lyrical, philosophical
- Published: 1912

Shadows of Forgotten Ancestors (Ukrainian: «Тіні забутих предків», romanized: Tini zabutykh predkiv) is a novel by Ukrainian writer Mykhailo Kotsiubynsky written in 1911 and inspired by his stay in the Hutsul region. The work described the love of Ivan and Marichka, two Hutsuls from rival families, which ends tragically for both. It focuses on aspects of Hutsul life and incorporates elements of folklore.

In 1960, a ballet with music by Vitaly Kyreiko was staged based on the book. In 1964, a film adaptation of the novel by Sergei Parajanov was screened.

== Background ==
In 1910, Mykhailo Kotsiubynky visited the Carpathian village of Kryvorivnya. His short stay in the area was not enough to give him material to write an entire novel, but the picturesque nature and pristine life of the inhabitants gave him a lasting desire to write about the Hutsul people. He later visited the region again, and stayed to study the customs, life, and folklore of the locals. According to Kotsiubynsky, Hutsuls in the 20th century remained pagans, and his impressions of the magic captivity of the mountain-dwelling people formed the basis for his story.

== Plot ==
Two children, Ivan and Marichka, live in a village near the Cheremosh river. Because of his solitude and curiosity about witchcraft and evil spirits, Ivan's mother believed him to be a changeling, a fairy left in place of a stolen human child. On his seventh birthday, Ivan hears a strange sound, despite being all alone. He later learns about the long-standing rivalry between the Paliychuk and Hutenyuk families, and witnesses an assassination attempt on his father, who succumbs to his wounds a few days later. In retaliation, Ivan attacks Marichka, who is the daughter of the killer, and throws her hair ribbons into the river. However, over time, the two forget about the incident.

Ivan and Marichka begin taking care of their families' grazing sheep together and eventually fall in love by the age of thirteen. However, since the death of Ivan's father, the economy has been in steep decline. The young man now goes to work in the meadow in the summer, shepherding sheep, milking them, and making bundz and bryndza.

One night, while he is guarding the bonfire, Marichka sees him again. But once he returned home from the meadow, he learned that Marichka was killed in a flood. He finds the body of his beloved and, overwhelmed by grief, wanders the mountains and living off the land. He is considered to be dead in the village.

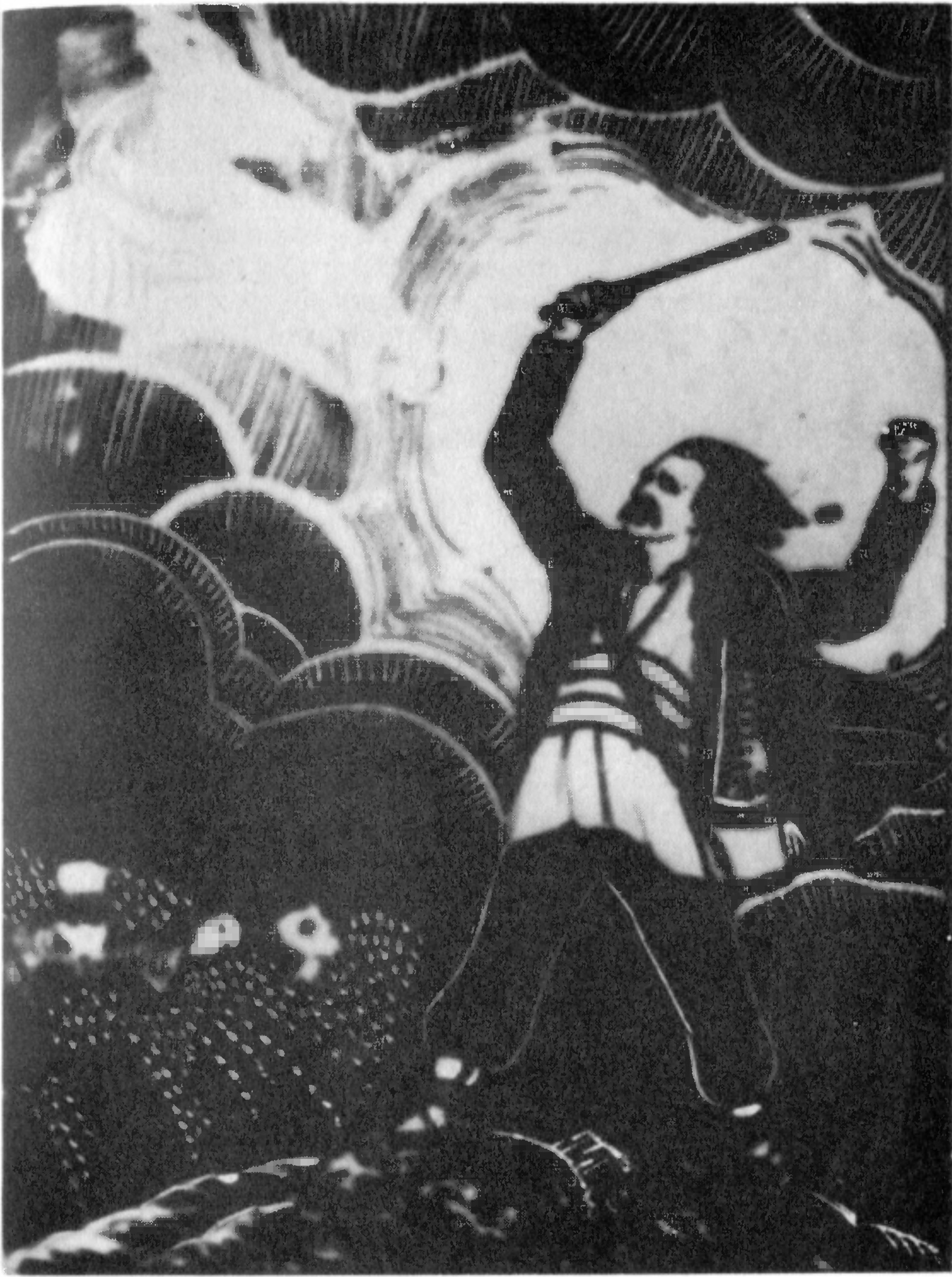
Molfar yura controlling a cloud with his cane

Six years later, Ivan once again returns home. He says he worked as a shepherd in Hungary. He marries a girl from a rich local family and settles down. However, his wife begins to consort with a man named Yura, a molfar who allegedly wields powerful magic, behind his back. Because of this, Ivan starts a fight with Yura at the bar in the local in and manages to wound him, but the molfar broke his weapon. Ivan leaves, but suspects that the molfar is slowly killing him with sorcery. Later, he spies on Yura, and sees him stabbing a doll, sending illness and death.

Ivan returns to the place where he once walked with Marichka, and she appears to him in the form of a mavka, a forest spirit. Suddenly she disappears, and Ivan starts a fire. Attracted by the fire, the Chuhaister, patron god of the forests, approaches Ivan. It asks where the mavka is, but, remembering a legend that the Chuhaister hunts mavka, Ivan does not reveal that he had seen Marichka. The Chuhaister invites him to dance, playing a song from Ivan's childhood. Exhausted from the dance, Ivan falls asleep. However, the voice of the mavka calls him deeper into the forest, and he follows to search for his beloved. While walking through thick underbrush, he falls into a precipice and is severely injured. The next day, local shepherds find him alive but badly wounded, and he soon succumbs to his injuries.

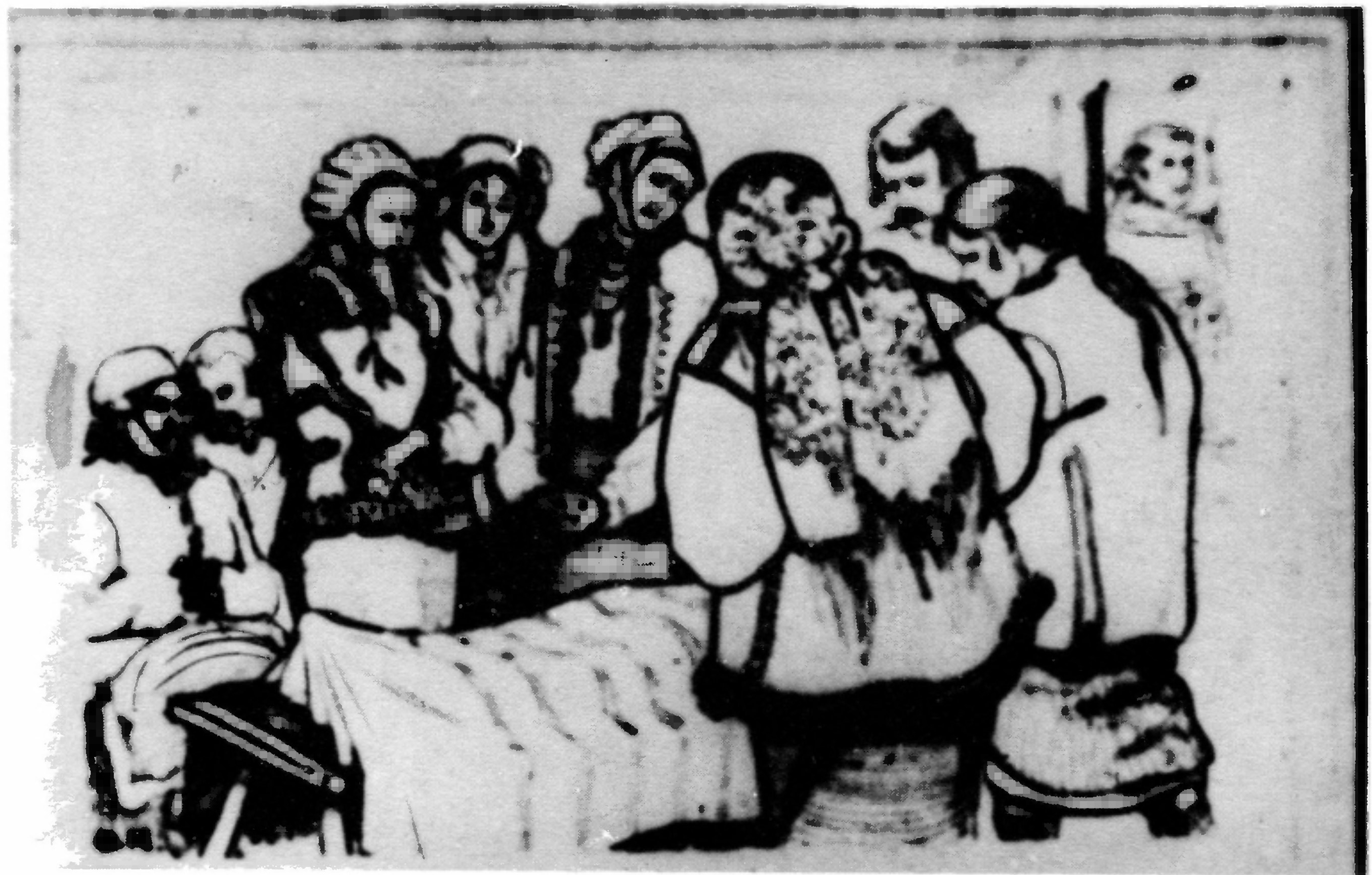
Ivan's funeral

Ivan is buried according to the local customs, with dances and song. The revelry at the funeral quickly grows, and to the beat of the dance, Ivan's body begins to shake, as if alive, to the tune of the trembita.

== Characters ==
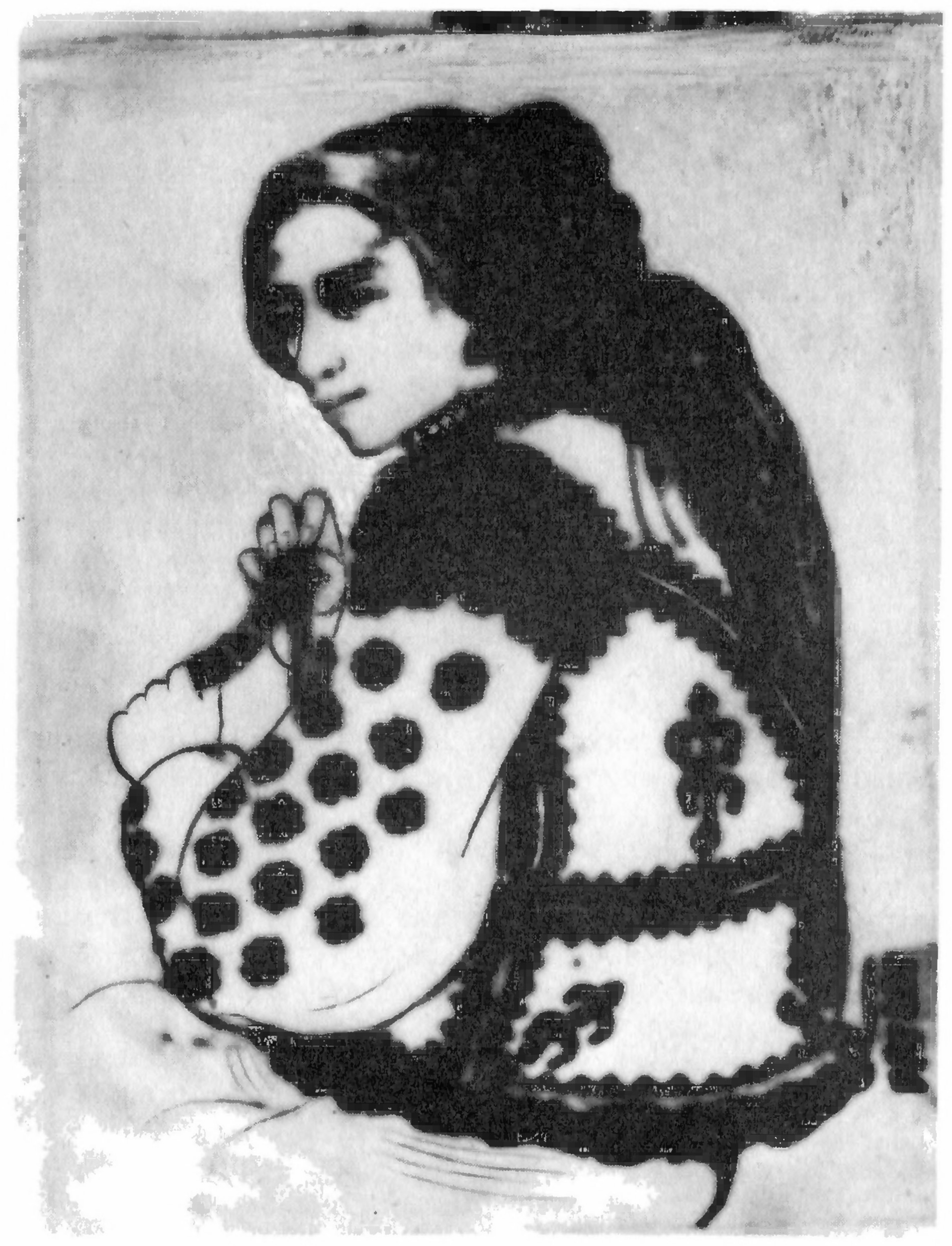
Depiction of Palahna

- Ivan Paliychuk: Central character in the story, the 19th child in his family, though most of his siblings died young. He is a social outcast and often flees into the woods. He is well acquainted with herbs and knows many stories about evil spirits.
- Marichka Gutenyuk: Ivan's lover from the rival Gutenyuk family. Has poetic talent, and composes and sings songs. When Ivan leaves, she is killed in a flood and later manifests herself to him as a mavka, leading him to his death.
- Palahna: A girl from a rich family whom Ivan marries after Marichka's death. However, she is upset with Ivan and does not understand him or his songs. She has an affair with a neighbor, a molfar named Yura, and approves of his sorcery.
- Yura: A molfar endowed with supernatural abilities. He has the ability to control the weather, save livestock, and harm people. He seeks to cause illness and death for Ivan.

== Adaptations ==
In 1964, a film adaptation by Sergei Parajanov based on the novel was released. The main roles were played by Ivan Mykolaychuk (Ivan), Larysa Kadochnikova (Marichka), Tetyana Bestaeva (Palagna), and Spartak Bagashvili (Yura).

In 2014, Vinnytsia hosted a literary and artistic project called "Tour of One Work" which was dedicated to the 150th anniversary of the birth of Mykhailo Kotsiubynsky. The event included an exhibition of the writer's office, a theatrical presentation based on "Shadows of Forgotten Ancestors," and a video installation. The theatrical presentation alternated between excerpts from the novel and stories about the process of its creation.

In 1960, a ballet adaptation by Vitaly Kyreiko was created. It premiered at the Lviv Theater and its libretto was created by Natalia Skorulska and Florian Kotsyubynsky. The ballet was staged again at the Kyiv Opera, and a 1990 ballet film was released based on this second performance.
