= Kadochnikov =

Kadochnikov, feminine Kadochnikova is a Russian patronymic surname derived from the occupation of kadochnik, 'cooper'. Notable people with the surname include:

- Aleksei Kadochnikov (born 1985), Russian darts player
- Larisa Kadochnikova (born 1937), Ukrainian actress
- Pavel Kadochnikov (1915–1988), Soviet/Russian actor, film director, screenwriter, and pedagogue
