= Italy–Ukraine relations =

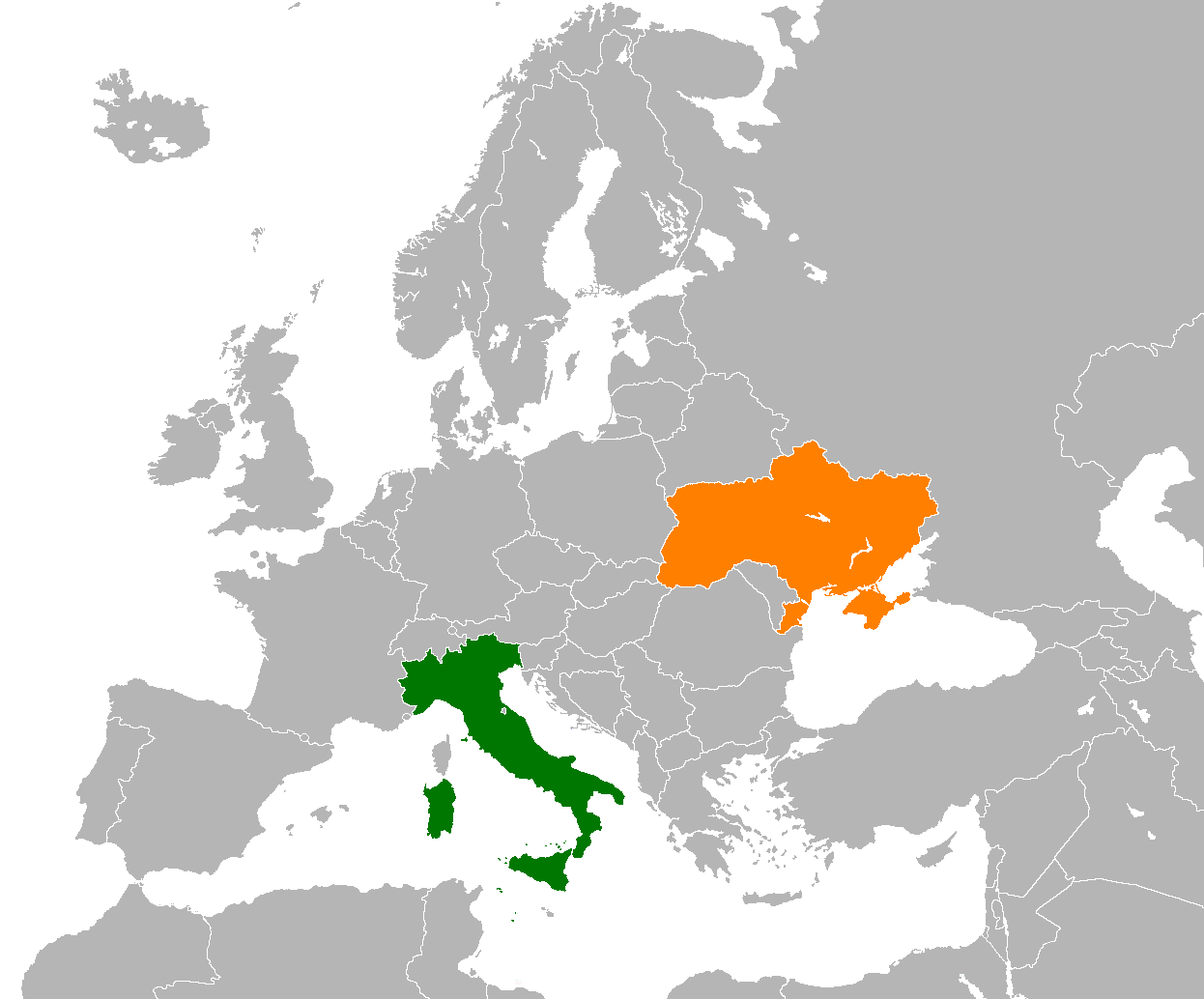
- Italy: Ukraine

Diplomatic mission
- Embassy of Italy, Kyiv: Embassy of Ukraine, Rome

Envoy
- Ambassador Pier Francesco Zazo: Ambassador Extraordinary and Plenipotentiary Yaroslav Melnyk

Italy–Ukraine relations are the bilateral relations between Italy and Ukraine. Italy has an embassy in Kyiv. Ukraine has an embassy in Rome and consulates in Milan and Naples. Italy is a member of the NATO and EU which Ukraine applied for in 2022. Both nations are members of the Council of Europe.

== History ==
Genoese-controlled territories in Crimea in the Late Middle Ages in red

In the Middle Ages, the Italian Republic of Genoa ruled parts of Crimea with the city of Caffa, and the town of Oleshia in modern southern Ukraine. The Genoese fortresses of Caffa (modern Feodosia), Cembalo (modern Balaklava), and Sudak remain landmarks of Crimea.

During World War II, the Ukrainian town of Pokrovsk was the location of a Soviet-perpetrated massacre of over 500 prisoners of war of various nationalities, including 89 Italians.

Italy recognized Ukraine's independence on 28 December 1991 and official diplomatic relations began on 29 January 1992.

== Political and diplomatic relations ==
In March 2012, the Vice-Ministers of Foreign Affairs of the two countries met in Rome to discuss political topics. In June of the same year, Ukraine's Foreign Affairs Minister Kostyantyn Gryshchenko met Italy's then Vice-Minister of Foreign Affairs Marta Dassù in Trieste in the context of a Central European Initiative Summit.

Since the beginning of the 2022 Russian invasion of Ukraine, bilateral relations between Italy and Ukraine have changed. The Italian government, through the Ministry of Foreign Affairs, declared its “strong condemnation of Russia’s unjustified and unprovoked aggression against Ukraine”. Italy has also underlined the violation of international law perpetrated by Russian authorities and has expressed its full support for the territorial integrity of Ukraine. Like other European nations and the European Commission itself, Italy supports the EU's action to isolate and exert economic pressure on Russia.

Initially, the government of Italy was not manifestly determined to impose economic sanctions on Russia as a form of countermeasure after the breakout of the war. The Ukrainian president Volodymir Zelenskyy, through his official Twitter account, then criticised Italian Prime Minister Mario Draghi for his reluctance to apply more severe sanctions against Russia. Subsequently, Italian support to the Ukrainian resistance became stronger: for example the Italian Ministry of Culture has offered to rebuild the Donetsk Academic Regional Drama Theater of Mariupol.

Italy was a supporter of the Minsk agreements for the cessation of armed conflict and establishing a dialogue with Russia.

== State visits ==
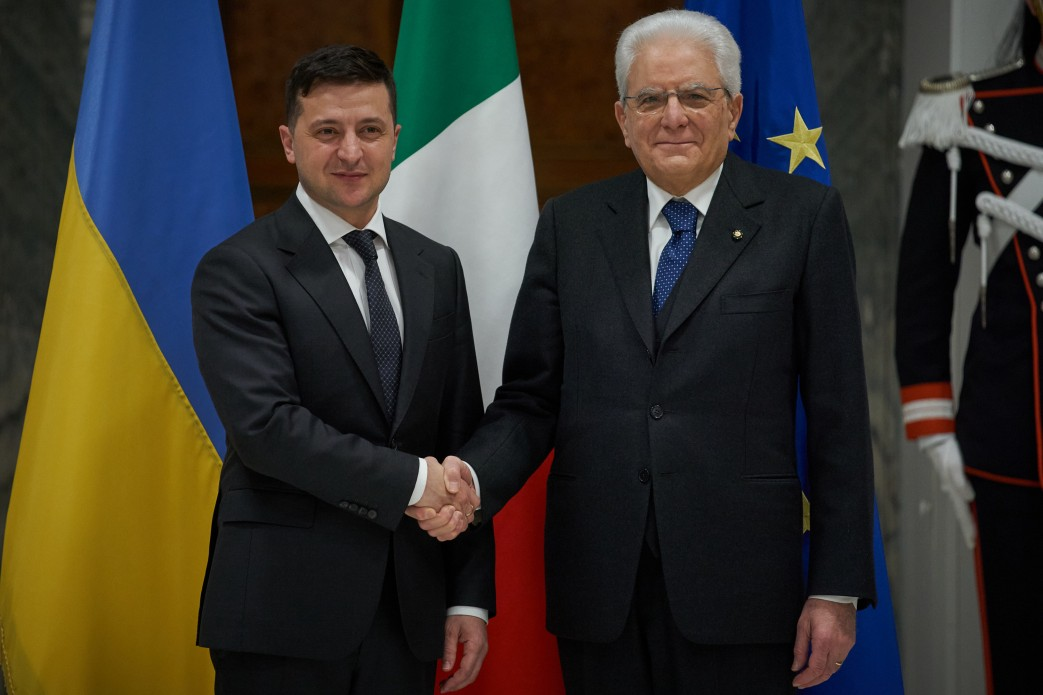
President of Ukraine Volodymyr Zelenskyy and President of Italy Sergio Mattarella meet during a state visit in 2020.

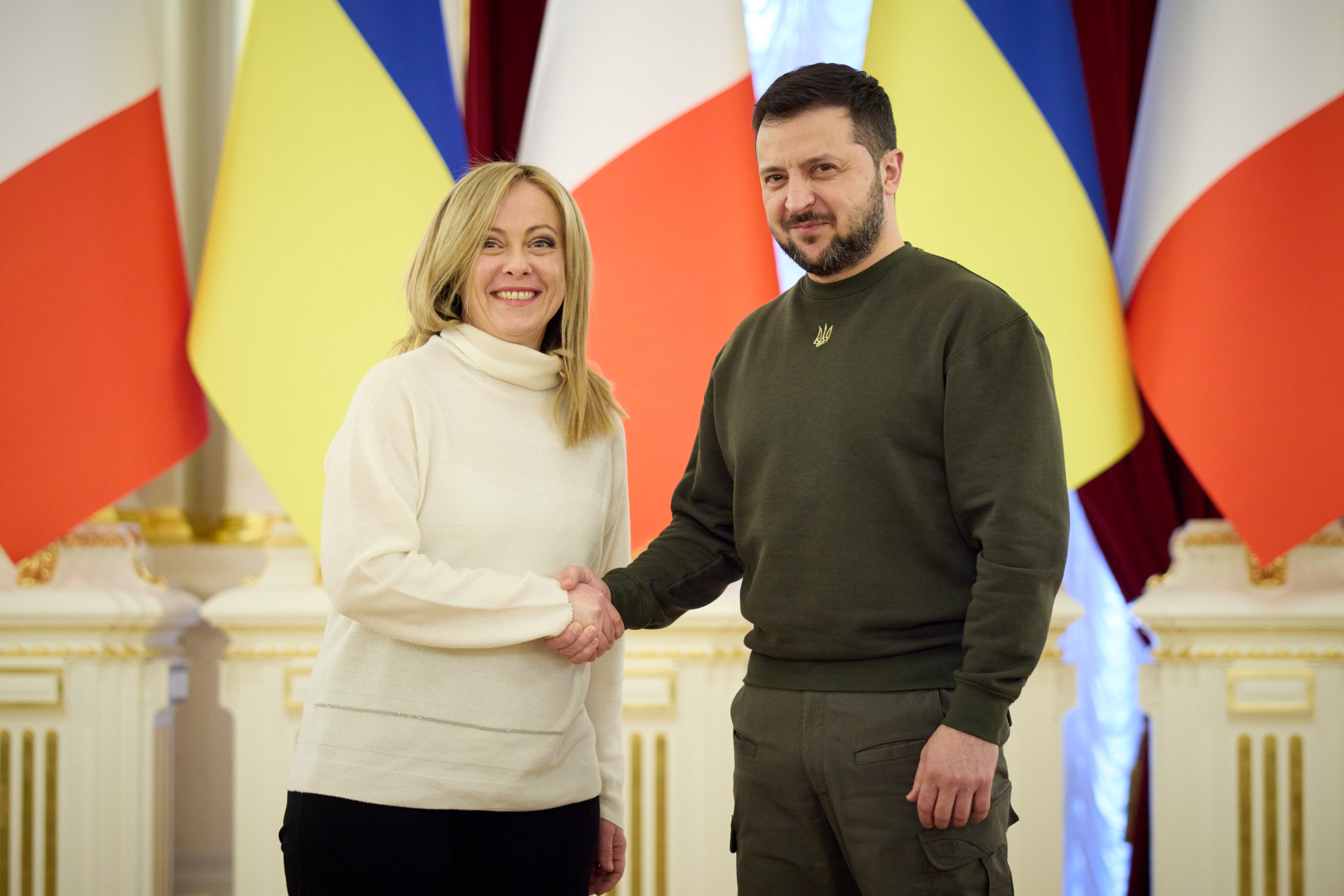
Italian Prime Minister Giorgia Meloni with Ukrainian President Volodymyr Zelenskyy meet in Kyiv, 21 February 2023

Ukraine's president has visited the Italian Republic several times: in May 1995, in November 2002, in October 2008,in November 2015, February 2020 and in May 2023.

The President of the Italian Republic visited Ukraine in 1996 and in 1999, whereas the Italian Prime Minister went to Ukraine in October 2003 and in March 2015.

== Economic relations ==
According to 2021 data, Italy is the second largest export market for Ukraine with €3,288 million of export values, and the fourth largest EU exporter to Ukraine with €2,113 million of export values.

The strongest connection in the economic field between Italy and Ukraine lies in the trade of metallurgical products: in 2021 Italy imported metallurgical goods from Ukraine for a total value of 1 billion euros. In the agri-food industry sector, the economic exchange amounts to about 300 million euros, mostly in the exchange of wheat. Italy exports to Ukraine mainly machinery and equipment, tobacco, chemicals, clothing, and food products.

According to the latest available data (2017), there are 175 Italian companies in Ukraine, with 6692 employees and an aggregate revenue of 433 million euros per year. The main Italian firms present in Ukraine are Ferrero, Intesa Sanpaolo, Eni, Mapei, Saipem, and Selex.

Another relevant socio-economic phenomenon is the migration of Ukrainian women in Italy. 78,6% of the aggregate Ukrainian population in Italy consists of women, most of whom work in the care of old and disabled people.

For Italy, Ukraine is also important for its role in the development of gas import routes.

== Resident diplomatic missions ==
- Italy has an embassy in Kyiv.
- Ukraine has an embassy in Rome and consulates-general in Milan and Naples.
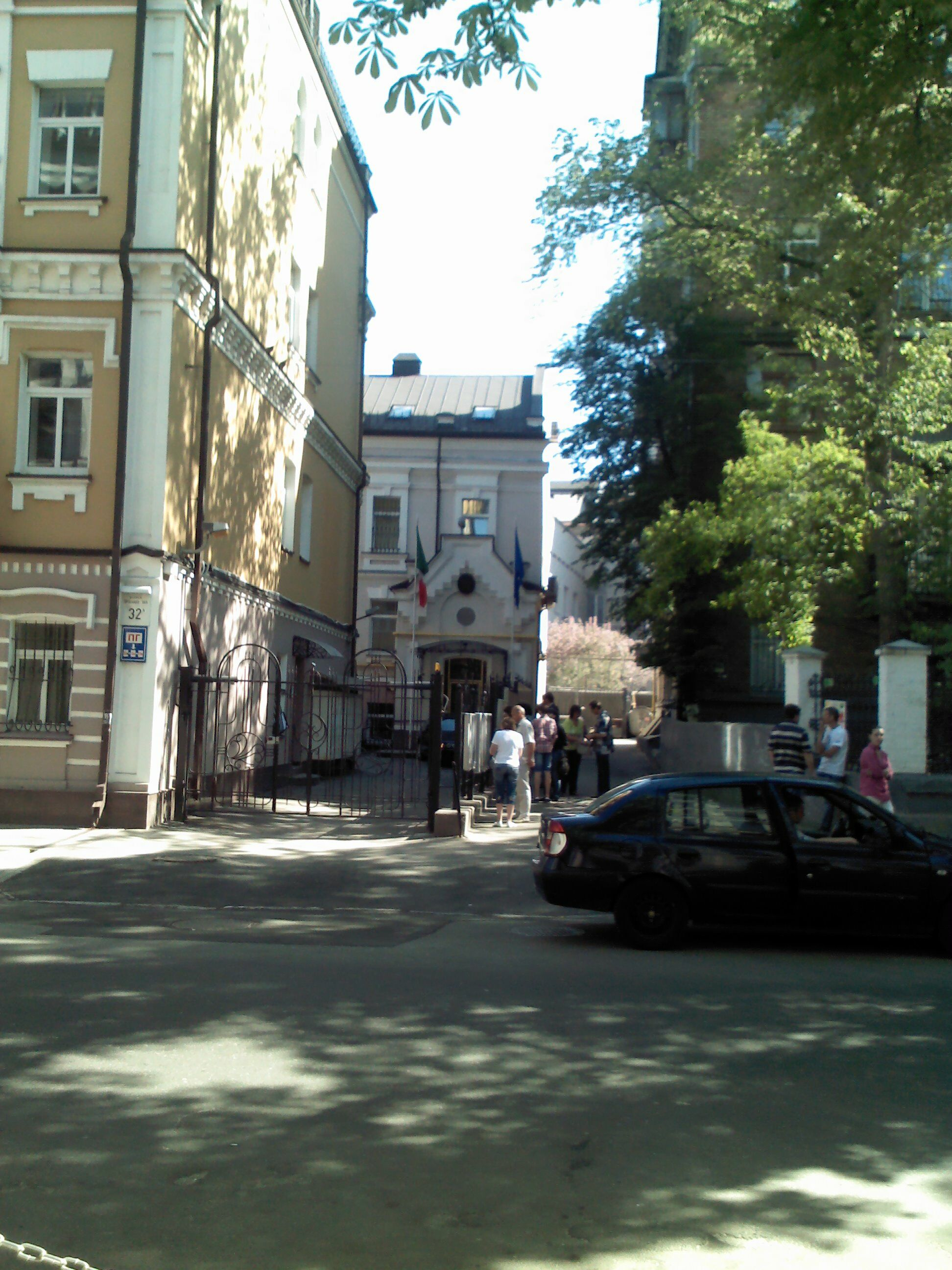
Embassy of Italy in Kyiv

== See also ==
- Foreign relations of Italy
- Foreign relations of Ukraine
- Ukraine-NATO relations
- Ukraine-EU relations
  - Accession of Ukraine to the EU
- Ukrainians in Italy
