= Molfar =

Ukrainian magicians

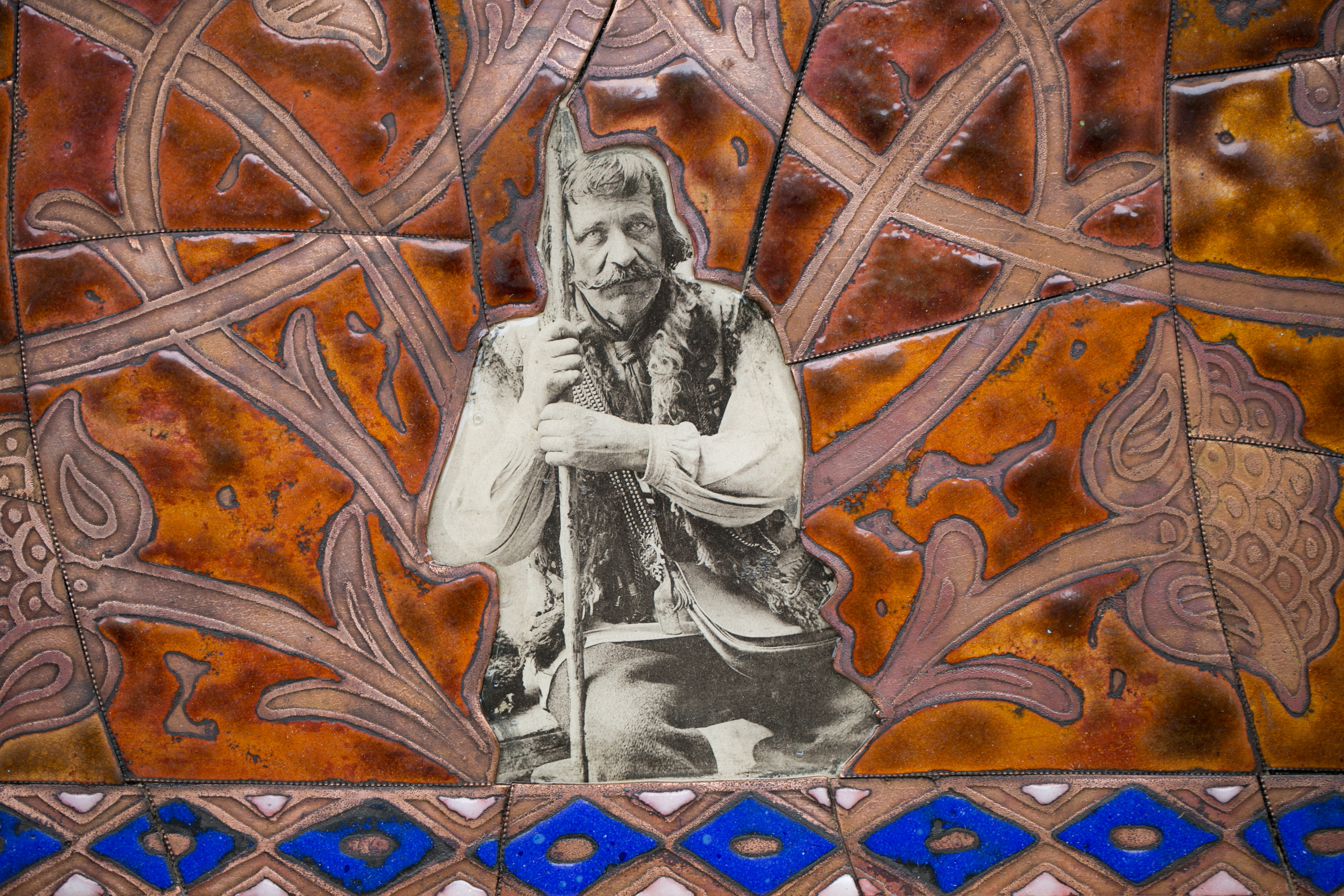

Creature information
- Folklore: Slavic Mythology

Origin
- Country: Ukraine, Romania

Molfar (Ukrainian: мольфар) is a traditional Hutsul magician and healer in the Ukrainian Carpathians who is believed to possess supernatural abilities. The image of the molfar was formed within the folk culture of Hutsulshchyna and is associated with a syncretic combination of pagan beliefs and Christian practices. In folk tradition, molfars are also referred to as soothsayers, seers, healers, and sorcerers.

Widespread interest in molfars arose in the early 20th century after the publication of Mykhailo Kotsiubynsky’s novella Shadows of Forgotten Ancestors (1911) and its film adaptation by Sergei Parajanov (1964).

== Etymology ==
The origin of the word molfar has not been definitively established. According to one version, it is related to the Hutsul term molfa, which denotes an enchanted object or a magical act. Another version traces it to the Italian verb malfare, meaning "to do evil", which may reflect the influence of church rhetoric condemning folk magical practices as diabolical. A third version connects the word to the Old East Slavic root мъл-, from мълва and мълвити meaning word or to speak, and the suffix -ar', denoting one who performs magic through words or incantations.

== Image of the Molfar ==
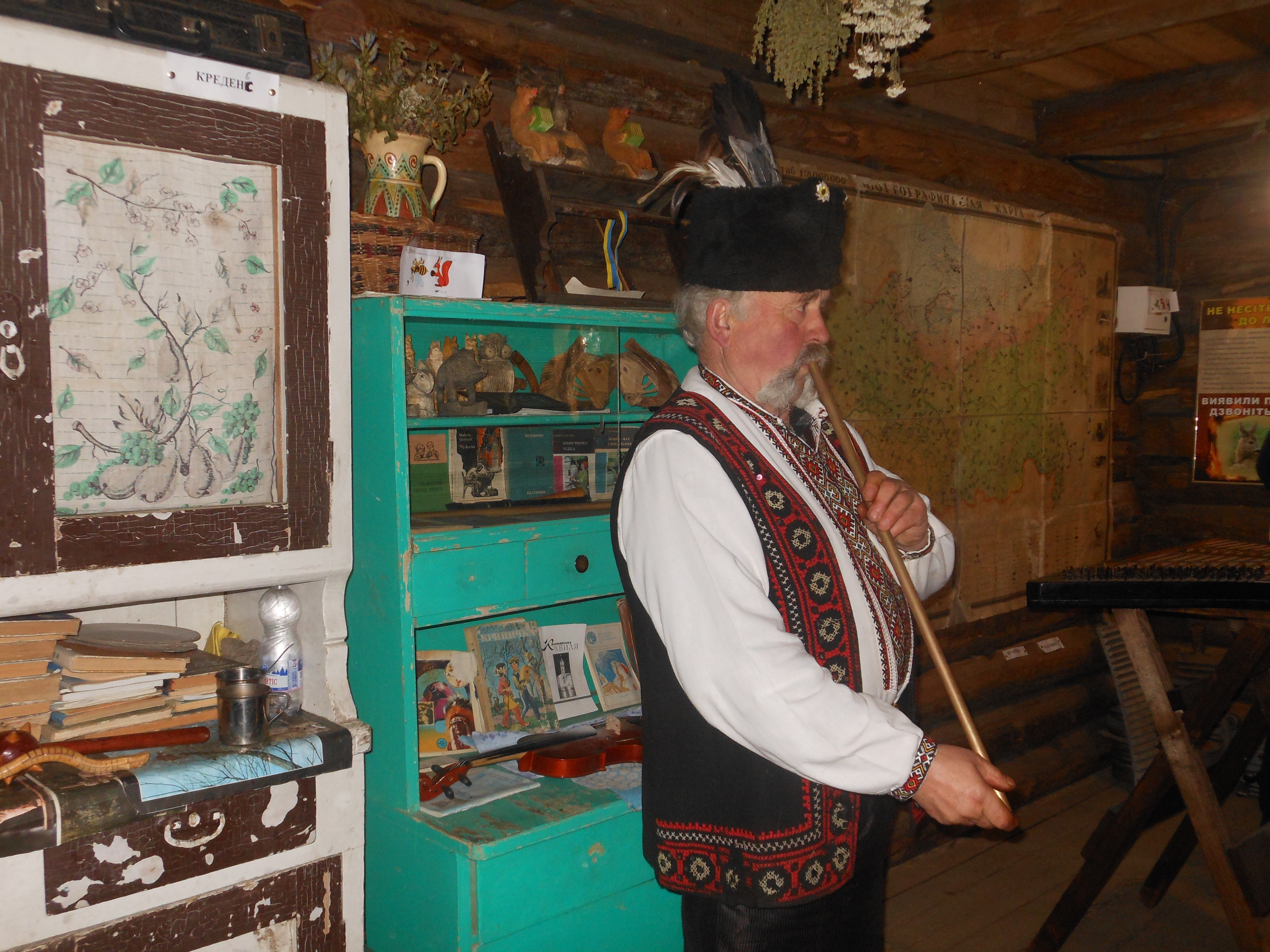
A modern molfar in Yablunytsia

The image of the molfar was formed in the Carpathians, where pagan beliefs and folk healing traditions were preserved. After the Christianization of Kievan Rus' in 988, paganism was officially banned; however, many ancient rituals and mythological concepts continued to exist among the people, intertwining with new forms of Christian tradition.

The molfar was seen as a village sage and spellcaster who lived in seclusion in the mountains or on the outskirts of a village. Often, molfars took one or several villages under their protection, serving as guardians of the community. A molfar could conceal his real name, using a nickname known only to local residents so that outsiders could not find him. Folk tradition depicted molfars either as old men with long mustaches and beards or as strong middle-aged men with thick dark hair and a heavy gaze.

A prominent Carpathian molfar was Mykhailo Nechay, who lived in Verkhniy Yaseniv and was killed in 2011.

== Literature ==
- Войтович В. Мольфар // Українська міфологія — К.: Либідь, 2005. — С. 321.
- Килимник С. Український рік у народних звичаях в історичному висвітленні. — К.: Обереги, 1994. — Кн. 2. Т. IV. — С. 445.
- Михайлов Н. А. Укр. мольфар, слвн. malavar и др. Демонологическая параллель // Балканские чтения 9. Terra balcanica. Terra slavica. К юбилею Татьяны Владимировны Цивьян. — М.: Институт славяноведения РАН, 2007. — С. 93-97.
- Мольфар // Етимологічний словник української мови. — К.: Наукова думка, 1989. — С. 506.
- Шевчук В. Мисленне дерево. — К.: Молодь, 1989. — С. 178.
