= Mykhailo Nechay =

Ukrainian Hutsul mystic (1930–2011)

Mykhaylo Nechay
- Михайло Нечай
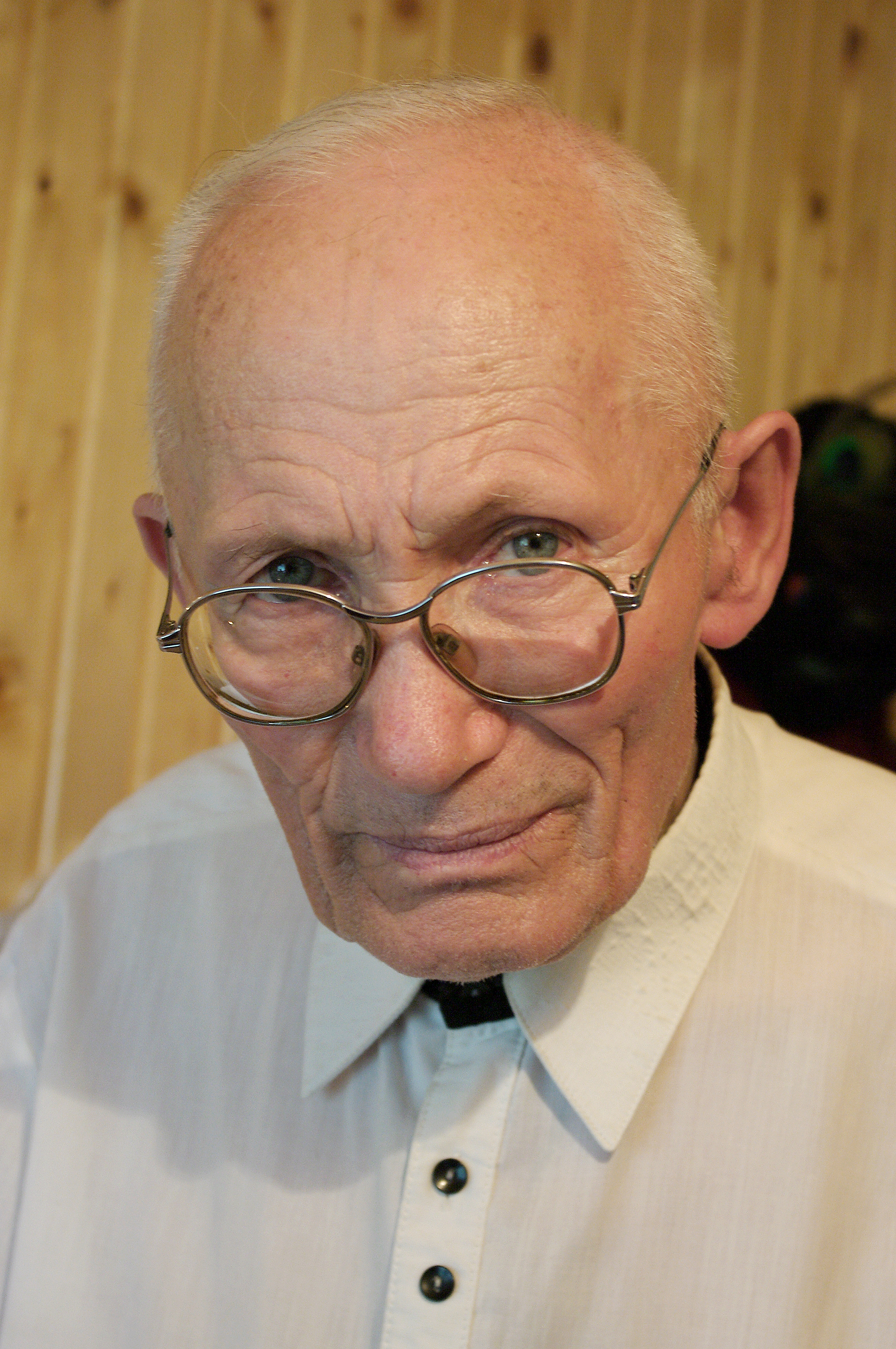
- Nechay in 2009
- Born: 24 February 1930; Verkhniy Yaseniv, Ukrainian SSR, Soviet Union (now Ukraine)
- Died: 15 July 2011 (aged 81); Verkhniy Yaseniv, Ukraine
- Known for: Shamanism, prophecies

Mykhailo Mykhailovych Nechay (Ukrainian: Миха́йло Миха́йлович Неча́й; 24 February 1930 – 15 July 2011) was a Ukrainian Hutsul molfar during the late 20th century and early 21st century. Commonly referred to as "the last molfar", Nechay has become known for his prophecies on Ukraine, predicting the fall of Viktor Yanukovych and the Russo-Ukrainian War.

== Early life ==
Mykhailo Mykhailovych Nechay was born into a working-class family in the village of Verkhniy Yaseniv on 24 February 1930. He graduated from the regimental school in Uman. He served two years in the Soviet army in Armenia and Georgia. He lived in Verkhniy Yaseniv, Ivano-Frankivsk Oblast. According to Nechay, he was a descendant of Danylo Nechai, a Ukrainian commander during the Khmelnytsky Uprising. According to him, he discovered that he had the miraculous power to stop bleeding at the age of eight.

== Career ==
Nechay first achieved recognition in Ukraine after 1989 when he became the first molfar to be officially invited to the Chervona Ruta festival to ensure pleasant weather for the event.

Director Sergei Parajanov consulted Nechay before shooting for his film Shadows of Forgotten Ancestors to get a better understanding of and the Hutsuls themselves. Actor Ivan Mykolaichuk consulted Nechay to learn how to play the Jew's harp as Nechay was the head of a ethnographic folk ensemble, and was known for playing the Jew's harp. In March 2010, Nechay was given the title of Merited Culture Worker of Ukraine for his service of forty years, as the head of the amateur band "Cheremosha Strings". In 2007 and 2009, the studio "Character" created two films about Nechay.

Nechay had two sons. His elder son Ivan served in the military and later succumbed to cancer. His second son Mykhailo worked as Deputy Chairman of the Verkhovyna administration.

== Death ==
On the morning of 15 July 2011, Nechay was killed in his house. According to witnesses, the suspected murderer had been trying for two days to get an appointment with molfar. As soon as he got an opportunity to be alone with Nechay, he killed him. On his way out, the murderer told the people outside who were waiting in queue to meet Nechay that he did not wish to be disturbed for a while.

Police investigations later revealed that the suspect was from the village Verkhniy Yaseniv. On the evening of 15 July 2011, a police officer from the Ivano-Frankivsk police department arrested the suspect in a wooded area near the village Bukovca. More than one hundred law enforcement officers were involved in the search operation. The suspect was a 33-year-old man who appeared to have a mental illness and had previously been convicted of killing a woman. After his release, he was treated for schizophrenia. According to preliminary indications, the accused seemed to have killed Nechay because he believed Nechay was pagan.

== Prophecies ==
Nechay has become known for his various prophecies pertaining to Ukraine. Prior to the 2007 Ukrainian parliamentary election, Nechay was asked whether he expected the next convocation of the Verkhovna Rada to be better or worse, with his prediction being published as an article in a Kyiv newspaper. On the day of the inauguration of Viktor Yanukovych, he claimed that Yanukovych would be killed in three years. This prophecy reportedly made him an enemy of Yanukovych, leading to conspiracy theories regarding Nechay's murder. Nechay also predicted the Russo-Ukrainian War, saying that Russia would seek control of the Donbas, and claimed that Poland, the Czech Republic, and Romania would also seek to claim Ukrainian territory in a bloody conflict.
