= Embassy of Italy, Kyiv =

Embassy of Italy in Kyiv
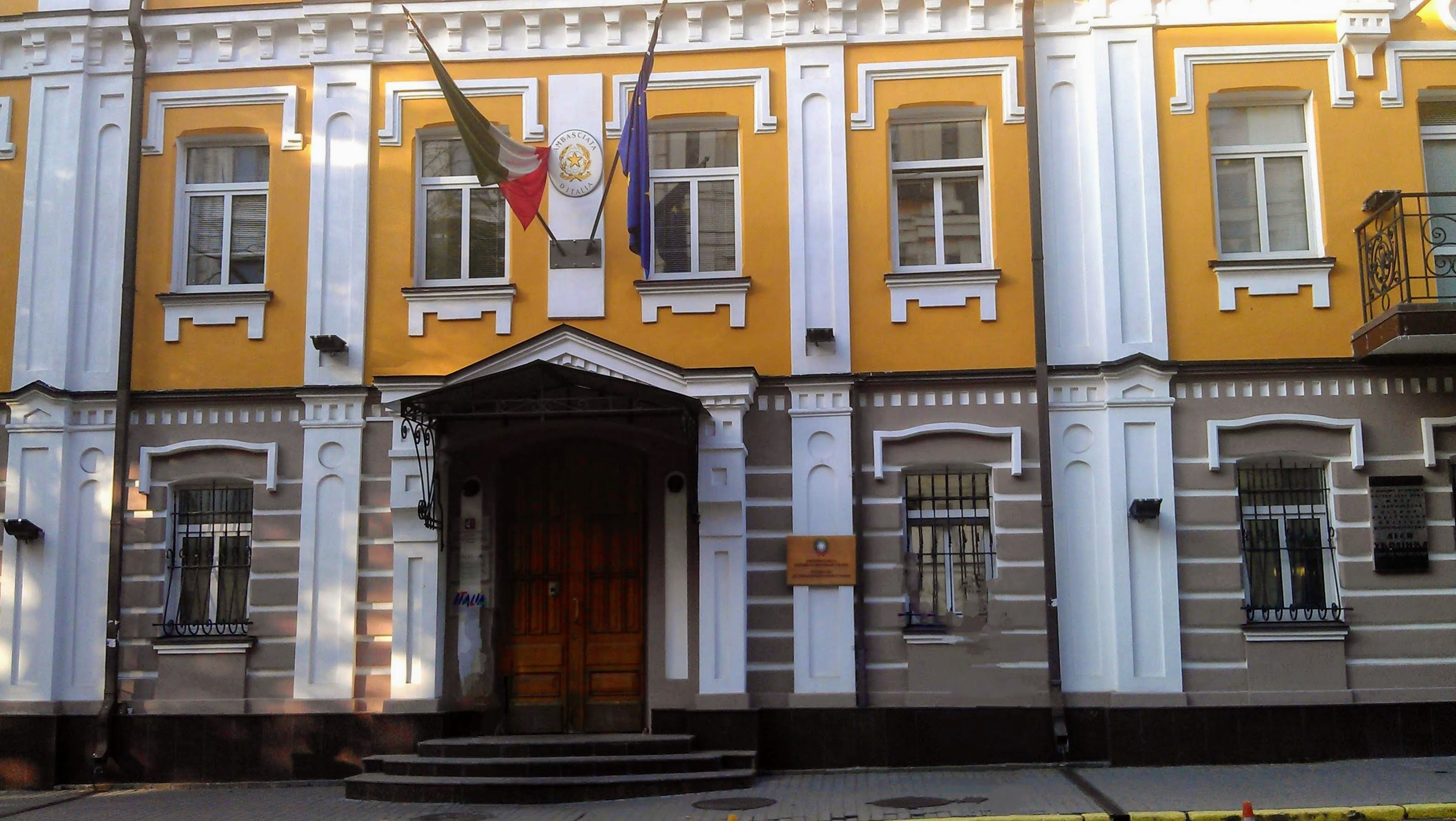
- Location: Kyiv
- Address: Yaroslaviv Val St., 32B, Kyiv 01901, Ukraine
- Coordinates: 50.4528°N 30.5082°E
- Ambassador: Pier Francesco Zazo

The Embassy of Italy in Kyiv is the diplomatic mission of Italy in Ukraine.

== History ==
Following Ukrainian independence on 24 August 1991, Italy recognized Ukraine on 28 December 1991. On 29 January 1992, diplomatic relations between Ukraine and Italy were established.

== Previous Ambassadors ==
1. Vittorio Claudio Surdo (1992-1996)
2. Gian Luca Bertinetto (1996-2000)
3. Jolanda Brunetti Goetz (2000-2004)
4. Fabio Fabbri (2004-2007)
5. Pietro Giovanni Donnici (2007-2012)
6. Fabrizio Romano (2012–2016)
7. Davide La Cecilia (2016–2021)
8. Pier Francesco Zazo (2021–present)

== See also ==
- Italy-Ukraine relations
- Foreign relations of Italy
- Foreign relations of Ukraine
- Embassy of Ukraine, Rome
- Diplomatic missions in Ukraine
- Diplomatic missions of Italy
