= Arquata =

Arquata may refer to:

- Arquata del Tronto, a municipality in the Province of Ascoli Piceno in the Marche region of Italy
- Arquata Scrivia, a municipality in the Province of Alessandria in the region Piedmont of Italy

== See also ==
- Arquà (disambiguation)
- Arquita, a genus of flowering plants
