= Negostina =

- Location within Romania

Location
- Country: Romania
- Counties: Suceava County
- Villages and towns: Negostina, Siret

Physical characteristics
- Mouth: Siret
  - location: Siret
  - coordinates: 47.9577°N 26.0821°E
- Length: 9 km (5.6 mi)
- Basin size: 23 km^{2} (8.9 sq mi)

Basin features
- Progression: Siret→ Danube→ Black Sea

The Negostina is a right tributary of the river Siret in Romania. It flows into the Siret in the town Siret. The basin size of the 9 km (5.6 mi) long Negostina is 23 km^{2} (8.9 sq mi). A 14th-century castle, built by prince Sas of Moldavia is located on its banks.
