= Shadows of Forgotten Ancestors =

1965 film by Sergei Parajanov

- Ukrainian original poster
- Ukrainian: Тіні забутих предків
- Directed by: Sergei Parajanov
- Screenplay by: Ivan Chendej; Sergei Parajanov
- Based on: Shadows of Forgotten Ancestors by Mykhailo Kotsiubynsky
- Starring: Ivan Mykolaichuk; Larysa Kadochnykova; Tatyana Bestayeva
- Cinematography: Yuri Ilyenko
- Music by: Myroslav Skoryk
- Production company: Dovzhenko Film Studios
- Distributed by: Holovkinoprokat (UkrSSR); Artkino Pictures (U.S.)
- Release date: 22 March 1965 (MFF); 4 Sep. 1965 (UkrSSR)
- Running time: 97 minutes
- Country: Soviet Union
- Language: Ukrainian
- Budget: Rbl.300–500 thousand
- Box office: 6.5 mil. admissions (Note: Note that in UkrSSR, as in the rest of the republics that were part of the USSR, the 'film box office' was usually tracked for statistical purposes not in monetary terms, but in terms of millions of admission tickets sold)

Shadows of Forgotten Ancestors, alternatively translated into English as Shadows of Our Forgotten Ancestors or Shadows of Our Ancestors (Ukrainian: «Тіні забутих предків», romanized: Tini zabutykh predkiv, pronounced [ˈt⁽ʲ⁾in⁽ʲ⁾i zɐˈbutɪx ˈprɛdkiu̯]), also known in English under the alternative title Wild Horses of Fire and under the mistaken title of In the Shadow of the Past, is a 1965 Soviet-era Ukrainian film directed by Sergei Parajanov. Based on the 1911 novel Shadows of Forgotten Ancestors by Ukrainian author Mykhailo Kotsiubynsky, it tells a "Romeo and Juliet tale" of young Ukrainian Hutsul lovers trapped on opposite sides of a Carpathian family blood feud.

The film was Parajanov's first major work and earned him international acclaim for its rich use of costume and colour. The festival program from the 1966 edition of the New York Film Festival described the film as an "avant-garde, extravagant, sumptuous saga" and a "haunting work" that combined folk-songs and atonal music with fantastic camera work. Shadows of Forgotten Ancestors is considered to be the most internationally heralded Ukrainian film in history, and a classic of Ukrainian magical realist cinema.

== Plot ==
In a small Hutsul village in the Carpathian Mountains of Ukraine, a young man, Ivan, falls in love with the daughter of the man who killed his father. Though their families share a bitter enmity, Ivan and Marichka have known each other since childhood. In preparation for their marriage, Ivan leaves the village to work and earn money for a household. While he is gone, Marichka accidentally slips into a river and drowns while trying to rescue a lost lamb.

Ivan returns and falls into despair after seeing Marichka's body. He continues to work, enduring a period of joyless toil, until he meets another woman, Palahna, while shoeing a horse. Ivan and Palahna get married in a traditional Hutsul wedding in which they are blindfolded and yoked together. The marriage quickly turns sour, however, as Ivan remains obsessed with the memory of Marichka. Estranged from her emotionally distant husband, Palahna becomes involved with a local molfar Yurko, while Ivan begins to experience hallucinations.

At a tavern, Ivan sees the molfar embrace Palahna and strike one of his friends. Roused into an uncharacteristic fury, Ivan snatches up his axe, only to be struck down by the molfar. Ivan stumbles into the nearby woods and perceives Marichka's spirit to be with him, reflected in the water and gliding amongst the trees. As reality merges into dream, the colourless shade of Marichka reaches out across a great space and touches Ivan's outstretched hand. Ivan screams and dies. The community gives him a traditional Hutsul burial while children watch through cross braced windows.

== Cast ==
- Ivan Mykolaichuk as Ivan
- Larysa Kadochnykova as Marichka
- Tatyana Bestayeva as Palahna
- Spartak Bagashvili as molfar Yurko
- Mykola Hrynko as Chief Shepherd
- Leonid Yengibarov as Mykola
- Nina Alisova as Paliychuk

== Production ==
=== Budget ===
The exact budget for Shadows of Forgotten Ancestors is currently not publicly known, and it is only available from the film's records at Ukrainian State Archives. The partial records gathered by Ukrainian film historians reveal that the cabinet ministers of UkrSSR in May 1966 issued a strongly worded reproach to Parajanov for "exceeding the budget of Shadows of Forgotten Ancestors by 97 thousand rubles". Ukrainian filmmaker Oleh Chornyi, however, speculated in 2019 that the film's budget was in line with typical film budgets of the time, ranging from 300 to 500 thousand rubles".

=== Filming ===
The film was one of the rare Ukrainian-language feature film productions at the Ukrainian Dovzhenko Film Studios, which typically produced only Russian-language film productions, some of which were later dubbed into the Ukrainian language for theatrical distribution in UkrSSR. The government officials had asked Parajanov to make a Russian version of the film, to which he stated that he has “long resisted translating the Ukrainian-language film dialogues into the Russian language" because he "considered this text to be an inalienable part of the artistic fabric of the film”. In his 1988 interview with Ron Holloway, Parajanov confessed that "the ministry asked me to make a Russian [dubbed] version [of the film]. The film was not only shot in the Ukrainian language, but it was also in the Hutsul dialect [of Ukrainian language]. They asked me to dub the film in Russian but I turned them down categorically."

The film is set in the Ukrainian part of the Carpathian Mountains and the location shooting of the village scenes took place in the Carpathian village of Kryvorivnia. The house in Kryvorivnia where the filming took place is now a museum. The indoor shooting took place in the pavilions at the Dovzhenko Film Studios.

=== Casting ===
Originally, Parajanov planned to cast a rising-star and box-office magnet Russian actor Genadi Yukhtin to play the main protagonist Ivan, but under the recommendation of filmmaker Viktor Ivchenko, along with comments from the film's cinematographer Yuri Ilyenko, that "Yukhtin just did not fit the part and when [during the try-outs] he dressed in the Ukrainian hutsul garments, it wasn't a fit for him", Parajanov later changed his decision, and cast a Ukrainian actor Ivan Mykolaichuk instead.

=== Music ===
The music was written by composer Myroslav Skoryk, who wrote the score inspired by Ukrainian hutsul folk culture. The haunting Ukrainian-folk music contributes to the film's grandeur, and is considered to be one of Skoryk's greatest film scores.

Many individuals who worked on the film admitted that the film was a result of collective effort, and was certainly not an auteur film reflecting the personalities and ideas of only its director Sergei Parajanov. Specifically, the film represented a creative catalogue of many Ukrainian artists, not least of all composer Myroslav Skoryk. Film historian James Steffen in his book The Cinema of Sergei Parajanov specifically called out the fact that "one of the most distinctive aspects of the film is its use of [Ukrainian] Hutsul folk music on the soundtrack in addition to Skoryk's folk-inspired orchestral compositions" and expressly noted that "Skoryk's original score, a Bartok-like composition that combines lively [Ukrainian] folk-based themes and rhythms with modernistic dissonance, complements the traditional folk songs used in the film and provides an effective emotional counterpoint to the image".

The film features leitmotifs that relate to each of the main characters, as well as to the spirit of the Ukrainian West (the hutsul region in the Carpathian mountains). Skoryk's rendition of a Ukrainian folk song The Willow Board (Ukrainian: Вербова дощечка, romanized: Verbova doshchechka), which was sung by an unknown choir; is played twice in the film and was intended to add musical drama to the wedding scenes. Another one of Skoryk's musical pieces in the film was his composition for the symphony orchestra Hutsul Triptych (Ukrainian: Гуцульський триптих, romanized: Hutsulskyi tryptykh).

== Release ==
=== Festival release ===
Throughout the film's festival run in Spring 1965, it represented "the Soviet Union" and not "the Ukrainian Soviet Socialist Republic", despite the fact that it was very distinctly Ukrainian. In 1965, the Head of State Film Agency of UkrSSR, Sviatoslav Ivanov, described in his diary how he, along with the film's main actors Larysa Kadochnykova and Ivan Mykolaychuk, went to Argentina for the Mar del Plata International Film Festival to represent the film there, noting that “we represented at the festival the Soviet Union, and we were not the Ukrainian, but the Soviet delegation. I was not offended by the words of greetings addressed to the Soviet Union (the crowd of Mar del Plata cried: ‘Viva Moscú’, ‘Viva Unión Soviética’) [...] We were just representatives of a great people and they [the Argentines] did not suspect the subtleties of relations within the two nations [of Russians and Ukrainians]".

The film began its international film festival tour in Spring 1965 and was warmly received by a number of film festivals around the world; later, esteemed American film critic Roger Ebert in his 1978 review noted, perhaps somewhat exaggeratingly, that the film won “almost every award in sight on the 196[5] film festival circuit”. Among the film's screenings at more prestigious film festivals were an in-competition screening at Mar del Plata International Film Festival in March 1965, an out-of-competition screening at Venice Film Festival in late August 1965, an out-of-competition screening at San Sebastian Film Festival in early June 1965, an out-of-competition screening at San Francisco International Film Festival in early October 1965, an out-of-competition screening at Barcelona International Film Festival's Week of Films in Colour in late October 1965, an out-of-competition screening at Montreal Film Festival in late June 1966, an in-competition screening at the inaugural Rome Film Festival in late October 1965, an out-of-competition screening at 'Soviet Film Week' in Rome in late November 1965, an out-of-competition screening at 'Soviet Film Week' in London in late November 1965, an out-of-competition screening at Locarno Film Festival in late July 1966, an out-of-competition screening at New York Film Festival in late September 1966, an in-competition screening at Thessaloniki Film Festival in late September 1966, an out-of-competition screening at BFI London Film Festival's Festival of Festivals in early December 1966, and an out-of-competition screening at Melbourne International Film Festival in late June 1967.

==== Special screening at Venice Biennale 1977 ====
In 1977, the usual Venice Film Festival was not held. Instead, a special cultural program of Cultural Dissent (Italian: Il Dissenso Culturale) was organised as a show of support by Italian artists for the repressed dissident artists from the Soviet Union and other communist countries. A part of this program consisted of a special seminar dedicated to the works of Parajanov and was aimed at showing support for his illegal imprisonment on trumped-up charges of homosexuality. The program also held a special Cinema from the Eastern Countries (Italian: Cinema e Paesi dell'Est) event in which two of Parajanov's films, one of which was Shadows of Forgotten Ancestors, were screened. Ahead of this screening, Lino Miccichè – who later became the president of the Venice Film Festival in 1997 – read a declaration which was signed by Italian filmmakers and film critics addressed to the government of the Soviet Union with a protest against the repression of dissident artists.

=== Theatrical release ===
The film began its theatrical release in UkrSSR on 4 September 1965 with a gala premiere in Kyiv at the Ukrayina movie theatre. This Kyiv premiere drew a significant political protest due to the growing imprisonment and oppression of Ukrainian intellectuals by the Soviet regime.

=== Home media and Restoration ===
In 2011, Ukrainian newspapers reported that in 2010, the Dovzhenko Centre had hired a company called TOV IBS to create a restored version of multiple films which included Shadows of Forgotten Ancestors as a part of the centre's push to release two DVD collections of thematic movies known as the Ivan Mykolaichuk Collection and the Yuri Ilyenko Collection. The type of restoration made in 2010 remains unknown, but the fact remains that the Dovzhenko Centre has indeed released a restored version of the film on DVD as a part of both collections, even as they were not for sale and were only intended for insider events.

Among the multiple home media releases (Note: Note that, in addition to the release of 2015's 'fully restored version', there have been a number of less notable home media releases including 2007 Kino Lorber's DVD release in the US and elsewhere in 2007 (under the sub-licensing agreement with the Russian film distribution company Russian Cinema Council/Ruscico), 2018/2019 Cinemark Gaffin/Kinokuniya Shoten's Blu-ray release in Japan (not a 'true' Blu-ray release, but rather a 4K upconverted version of their earlier 1998/2018 DVD releases) etc.), the most significant is the 2015 fully restored version – a "long overdue" version (as described by one of the main actors of the film – Larisa Kadochnykova – in early 2015) with fully restored audio and image – that was created to commemorate the 50th anniversary of film's release. This 2015 fully restored version was commissioned in July 2015 by the Ukrainian State Film Agency (in association with the Dovzhenko Centre) and the Ukraine's Ministry of Culture. In September 2015, this fully restored version premiered on Ukrainian public TV channel UA:Pershyi, in multiple movie theatres throughout Kyiv, and in 24 movie theatres across the other 5 big cities of Ukraine.

On 14 August 2026, The Criterion Collection announced their editions of the film on both Blu-ray and 4K Ultra HD, which releasd 17 November that year. These editions feature a new restoration courtesy of The Film Foundation's World Cinema Project (including uncompressed audio), an introduction by World Cinema Project founder Martin Scorsese, an interview with Kadochnykova, and two additional films (the 2025 documentary The Lilac Wind of Parajanov and the 2026 experimental short film Shadowsur).

== Reception ==
=== Box office ===
The theatrical release of Shadows of Forgotten Ancestors had enjoyed a limited commercial success in UkrSSR and other republics of the USSR. The film drew an impressive 6.5 million (according to some sources 8.5 million) admissions during its theatrical run from 1965 to 1966 across the UkrSSR and other republics of the USSR. This was the second best of Parajanov's movies, only behind his 1959 communist kolhosp flick The Top Guy which amassed 21.7 million admissions in domestic USSR box-office.

=== Critical response ===
The film was released in March 1965 to generally favourable reviews from Anglophone film critics from abroad and mixed reviews from Ukrainian film critics from UkrSSR. The 1967 edition of Britannica Book of the Year listed Shadows of Our Forgotten Ancestors among four stand-out films that came out that year from Eastern Europe and called it a "free-wheeling, extravagantly sumptuous saga". On the review aggregator website Rotten Tomatoes, the film holds an approval rating of 93% based on 40 reviews, with an average rating of 8.1/10.The website's critical consensus states: "Shadows of Forgotten Ancestors impresses with its kinetic visual approach, but it's the affecting story and soulful performances that truly linger". On the ranking aggregator website TSPDT the film is ranked 431st in their ranking of 1000 Greatest Films.

Upon its release, the film attracted mostly positive reviews from Anglophone film critics. Gene Moskowitz of Variety called it "visually resplendent" and "youthfully excessive, but filmically beguiling film in spite of its way out techniques", while Andrew Sarris, also of Variety, stated that it was a "technically admirable if dramatically incomprehensible" film. Roger Ebert, reviewing the film for Chicago Sun-Times in 1978 following Parajanov's imprisonment in Siberian GULAG labor camps in the 1970s, called it "one of the most unusual films I’ve seen, a barrage of images, music and noises, shot with such an active camera we almost need seatbelts" and compared Parajanov's work to "some of the early work of Martin Scorsese". Stephen Holden of The New York Times, called it an "eruptively colourful movie", "charged with fantastical imagery", a "surreal folk fable strewn with larger-than-life characters whose faces and body language speak more eloquently than any words". Edward Guthmann of San Francisco Chronicle described the film as "one of those rare films that look totally fresh and uncorrupted – as if the director hadn't pilfered a thing from other film makers but had simply discovered the camera, and how best to use it, by himself". David Parkinson of Empire praised the film, calling it "a cinematic masterpiece, deconstructing the cinematic form and message and blowing the audience away with its multi-layered imagery […] pure genius"; and in his book History of Film, Parkinson further expanded on his reception of the film by calling it "an audacious assault on the conventions of narrative and visual representation" that sought to "redefine the relationship between causal logic and screen space, and thus challenge accepted theories of audience perception" which managed to, paradoxically, "juxtapose subjective and objective viewpoints and use angular distortions, intricate (and seemingly impossible) camera movements, 'rack focus', telephoto-zoom and fish-eye lenses, and what [Paradjanov] termed a 'dramaturgy of colour' to recount his tale of doomed love". Jonathan Rosenbaum of Chicago Reader noted that it was an "extraordinary merging of myth, history, poetry, ethnography, dance, and ritual". Dave Kehr of The New York Times, described it as a "lyrical, unruly film" that "experiments with a nonrealistic use of color and some of the most free-spirited camerawork seen in a Ukrainian film since the pioneering work of [O]leksandr Dovzhenko", while James Hoberman of The Village Voice, praised it as an "overwhelmingly beautiful movie" where "a sad, short, brutalised life is elevated to ecstatic myth". John Patterson of LA Weekly called it a "startling combination of ethnography, [...] folk-myth and fairy-tale logic that sears the retina with its beauty, energy and ceaselessly inventive filmmaking."

However, reviews from Ukrainian film critics upon its release were mostly mixed. Y. Boboshko and M. Maslovs'kyi, writing for Soviet Culture in November 1964, criticised the film's departure from socialist realism, and through a humorous poem, emphasised that instead of tales of "shadows of ancestors", the authors should be creating stories about "contemporaneity". S. Zinych and N. Kapel'horods'ka, writing for Folk Art in October 1965, emphasised the importance of the literary 'source material' for the film and highlighted the fact that the film was produced to commemorate the 100th anniversary of Mykhailo Kotsiubynsky's birthday – the author of the eponymous novel Shadows of Forgotten Ancestors that served as the basis for film's plot; they also emphasised that Parajanov's film managed to masterfully re-create the cultural unicity of western Ukraine's peasants, particularly praising film composer Myroslav Skoryk's fitting choice of Ukrainian folks songs/music as well as cinematographer Yuri Ilyenko's and production designer Heorhiy Yakytovych's appropriate choice of aesthetics that accurately depicted Ukrainian hutsul peasants's customs, traditions and beliefs. Ivan Drach, whose review of the film was printed in 1969 book Film Directors and Films of Ukrainian Modern Cinema: Artistic Portraits, emphasised that what makes Shadows of Forgotten Ancestors so powerful is film's use of authentic Ukrainian dialogues in the form of the Hutsul Ukrainian accent as well as its use of Ukrainian ethnographic material. Larysa Pohribna, in her 1971 book Kotsiubynsky's Works on Screen, spoke negatively about the film and highlighted that Parajanov's Shadows of Forgotten Ancestors failed to live-up to the Kotsiubynsky's literary source material, and concluded that "servile copying of the literary source material leads only to the creation of weak films".

Given that Parajanov's film drastically departed from the officially 'approved' socialist realism artistic style of the time, it is surprising that Ukrainian film critics were not louder in their reproachment of Shadows of Forgotten Ancestors as they would have expected to be. This could be partially due to Ukrainophilic tendencies of the-then head of UkrSSR Petro Shelest who served as a 'patron-protector' of sorts to Parajanov, and Shelest's son Vitaliy later stated in his memoirs that "Paradjanov essentially was being protected [by his father, i.e., Petro Shelest]; practically the same day that father left [the post of the head of UkrSSR] – Parajanov got arrested".

=== Awards and notable film festival screenings ===
The film began its international film festival tour in Spring 1965 and was warmly received by the film festival crowd. Among the many awards received and the non-competition screenings that the film had, the most notable were:

- Grand Jury Award: Southern Cross for Best Production and Critics' Grand Prize – Mention for Colour Photography, Special Effects and Film Scenography – Mar del Plata International Film Festival (March 1965)
- Non-competition screening – San Sebastian Film Festival (June 1965)
- Non-competition commercial section screening – Venice Film Festival (August 1965)
- Italian Tourist Office Award – Rome Film Festival (October 1965)
- Non-competition screening – San Francisco Film Festival (October 1965; again in 1976 as a part of a retrospective)
- Non-competition screening – 'Soviet Film Week' in Rome (November 1965)
- Non-competition screening – Barcelona International Film Festival's Week of Films in Colour (October 1965)
- Non-competition screening – 'Soviet Film Week' in London (November 1965)
- Jury Special Prize – All-Union Film Festival in Kyiv (May 1966)
- Non-competition screening – Montreal Film Festival (July 1966)
- Non-competition screening – Locarno Film Festival (July 1966)
- Non-competition screening – New York Film Festival (September 1966)
- Golden Medal for Best Director – Thessaloniki Film Festival (September 1966)
- Non-competition screening – BFI London Film Festival's Festival of Festivals (December 1966)
- Non-competition screening – Melbourne International Film Festival (June 1967; again in 2019 as a part of a retrospective)
- Shevchenko National Prize in Cinematography (1988/1991 (Note: Note that in 1991 Shevchenko National Prize in Cinematography for the film Shadows of Forgotten Ancestors was awarded not just to film's director Sergei Parajanov (posthumously), but also to cinematographer Yuri Ilyenko, actor Larysa Kadochnykova, and production designer Heorhiy Yakutovych; further note that the actor Ivan Mykolaichuk already received Shevchenko National Prize in Cinematography in 1988 (posthumously) for, among others, the film Shadows of Forgotten Ancestors))

== Legacy ==
=== In popular culture ===
In 2013 the band A Hawk and a Hacksaw released their sixth studio album You Have Already Gone to the Other World under the label LM-Duplication as a brand new rescore of the film. Prior to album's release, in 2012 the band performed the album You Have Already Gone to the Other World live during their tour in, among others, the UK, Portugal, Italy and Switzerland as well as during multiple screenings of the film in the US.

In 2022 Ukrainian singer Alina Pash released a song with the same title as the film.

Ukrainian black metal band Nokturnal Mortum frequently sample the opening credits music for album/song intros.

== Themes ==
In his 1988 interview with Ron Holloway, Parajanov confessed that after previously filming 8 films in Ukraine, it was in this film that he was finally able to "find his theme, his field of interest: the problems faced by the [Ukrainian] people". Parajanov further emphasised that he deliberately "focused on ethnography, on God, on love and tragedy".

The film's visuals differed from the officially 'approved' socialist realism style that, according to the Soviet government, was to be used by all artists. Instead, Shadows of Forgotten Ancestors is highly symbolic, making frequent use of Ukrainian religious and folkloric images that included crosses, lambs, graves, and spirits. The film also uses colour to represent mood: during Ivan's period of mourning, black and white film stock is used, while in other scenes, colours are often muted, providing a contrast to the vivid usage of red and yellow.

== See also ==
- List of Ukrainian films
- Verbovaya Doschechka
