= Embassy of Ukraine, Rome =

Embassy of Ukraine in the Italian Republic
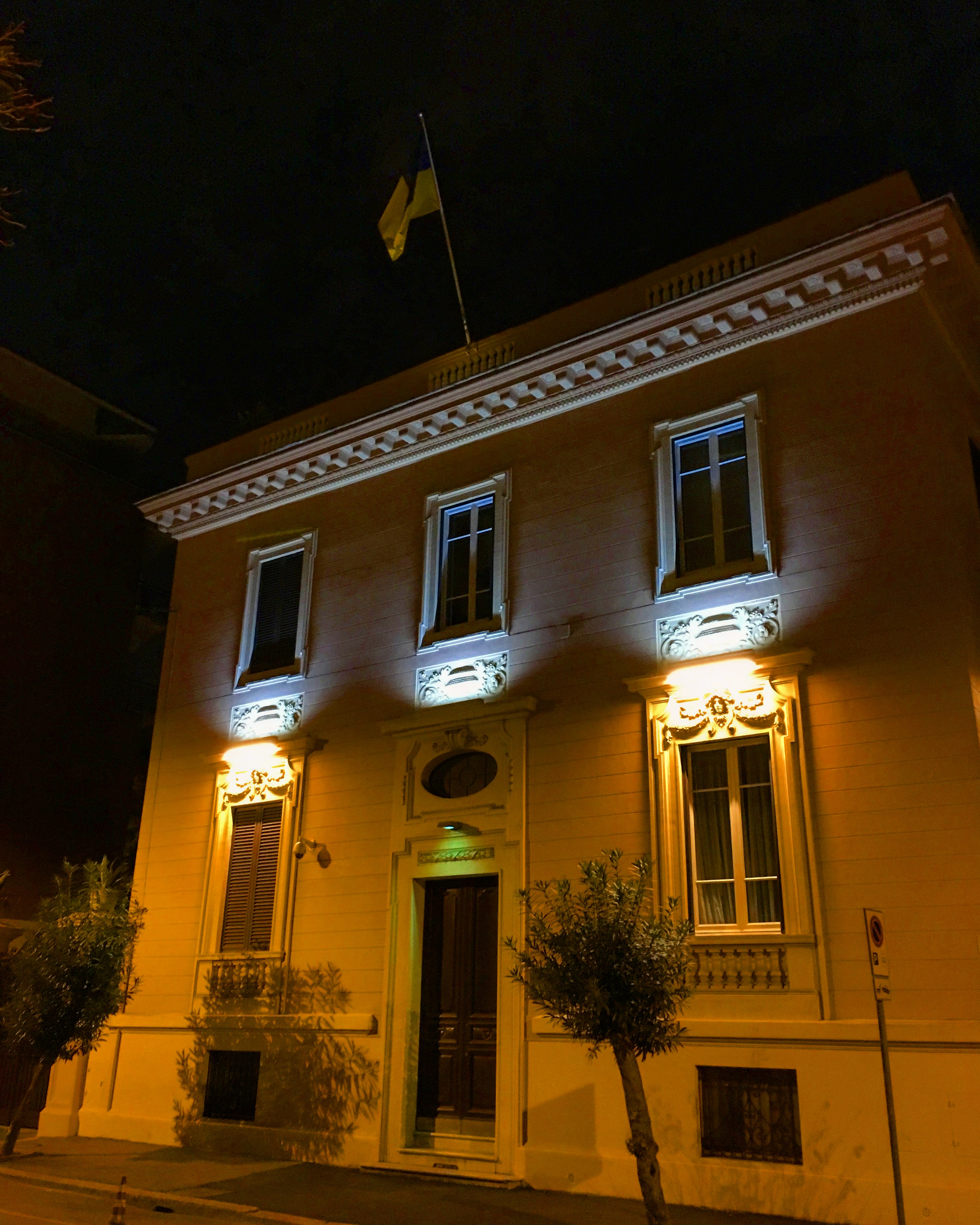
- Embassy of Ukraine in Rome, Italy.
- Location: Rome, Italy
- Address: Via Guido d'Arezzo, 9 00198 Rome, Italy.
- Ambassador: Perelyhin Yevhen Yuriiovych (as of February 2021)

The Embassy of Ukraine, Rome is an embassy located in Rome, Italy. It is hosts the primary diplomatic mission from Ukraine to the Italian Republic. It is also concurrently accredited to the Republic of San Marino and the Republic of Malta.

== History of Diplomatic Relations Between Ukraine and Italy ==
Ukraine and Italy established diplomatic relations in 1992, soon after Ukraine gained its independence from the Soviet Union. Italy also supported Ukraine's sovereignty over the Crimean Peninsula in the 2014 annexation of Crimea by the Russian Federation.

Like other Western European countries, Italy has welcomed Ukraine's attempts in recent years to have closer ties to the European Union and NATO. Nevertheless, Italian-Ukrainian relations are not entirely harmonious. The Donetsk People's Republic and Luhansk People's Republic opened and maintained informal diplomatic offices in Italy as of 2020. On a visit to Italy in February 2020, Ukrainian President Volodymyr Zelenskyy urged Italian Prime Minister Giuseppe Conte to shut down the DPR and LPR's "illegal" offices in Italy.

In addition to the Ukrainian embassy in Rome, Ukraine maintains consulates in the Italian cities of Florence, Bari, and Milan. Italy maintains an embassy in the Ukrainian capital, Kyiv.

== Known Ambassadors from Ukraine to Italy ==
- Borys Hudyma (2000 - April 4, 2004)
- Yevhen Perelygin (February 14, 2013 - July 15, 2020)
- Yaroslav Melnyk (September 21, 2020)

== See also ==
- Foreign relations of Italy
- Foreign relations of Ukraine
- List of diplomatic missions in Italy
- List of diplomatic missions of Ukraine
