= Arquà =

Arquà may refer to:

- Arquà Petrarca, a commune in Padua, Italy
- Arquà Polesine, a commune in Rovigo, Italy
