= Larysa Kadochnykova =

Ukrainian and Russian actress (born 1937)

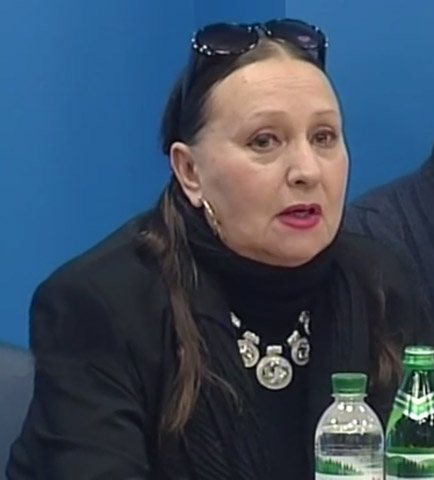
Larisa Kadochnikova in 2014

Larysa Valentynivna Kadochnykova (Russian: Лариса Валентиновна Кадочникова, Ukrainian: Лариса Валентинівна Кадочникова; born 30 August 1937, Moscow, USSR) is a Ukrainian actress. She appeared in Shadows of Forgotten Ancestors, a 1964 film directed by Sergei Paradjanov, and The Eve of Ivan Kupala.

== Shadows of Forgotten Ancestors ==
Shadows of Forgotten Ancestors has been viewed as one of the most vivid and gratifying films of Soviet cinema as well as an exceedingly unorthodox one. The storyline revolves around two separated lovers caught in a family feud. The film created a stir worldwide, being praised for its direction, cinematography and soundtrack, among other aspects. Larysa Kadochnykova, among others participants of film's authors, won Shevchenko National Prize for acting.
