= Mykhailo Kotsiubynsky =

Ukrainian author (1864–1913)

- Михайло Коцюбинський
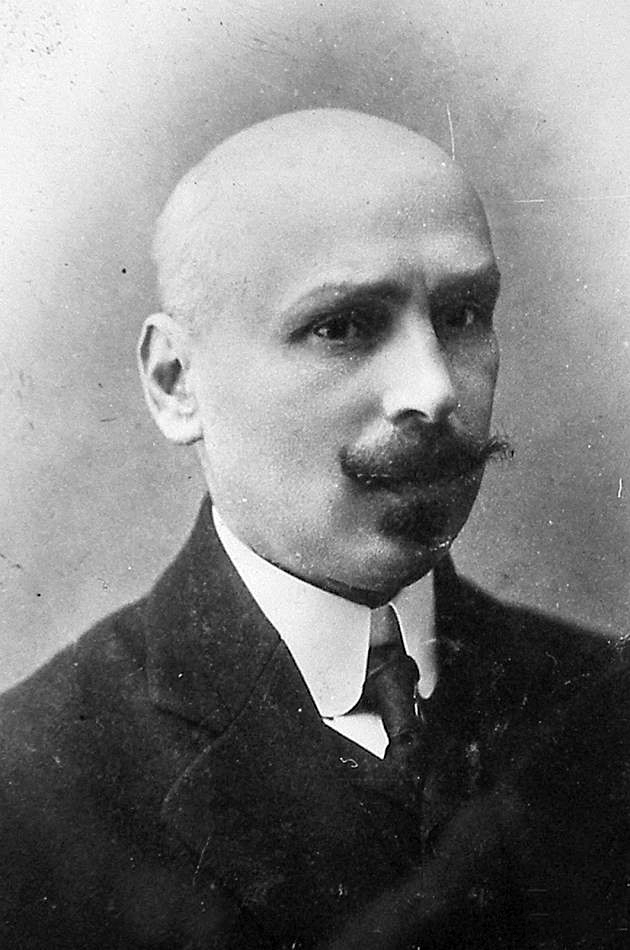
- Born: 17 September 1864; Vinnitsa, Russian Empire
- Died: 25 April 1913 (aged 48); Chernigov, Russian Empire
- Occupation: Writer
- Spouse: Vira Kotsiubynska
- Children: 4, including Yuriy
- Writing career
- Pen name: Zakhar Kozub
- Notable works: Shadows of Forgotten Ancestors; Intermezzo

Signature
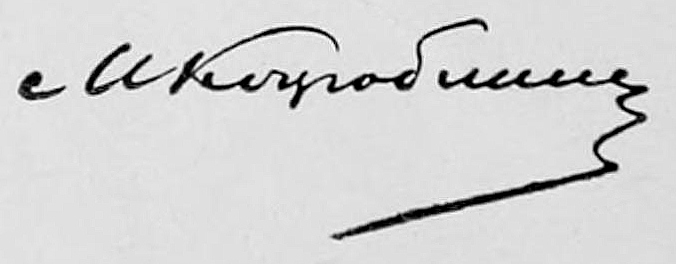

Mykhailo Mykhailovych Kotsiubynsky (Ukrainian: Михайло Михайлович Коцюбинський, Ukrainian pronunciation: [mɪˈxai̯ɫo mɪˈxai̯ɫowɪt͡ʃ kot͡sʲʊˈbɪnʲsʲkɪi̯]; 17 September 1864 – 25 April 1913) was a Ukrainian author whose writings described typical Ukrainian life at the start of the 20th century. Kotsiubynsky's early stories were described as examples of an ethnographic realism; in the years to come, with his style of writing becoming more and more sophisticated, he evolved into one of the most talented Ukrainian impressionist and modernist writers. The popularity of his novels later led to some of them being made into Soviet movies.

== Life ==
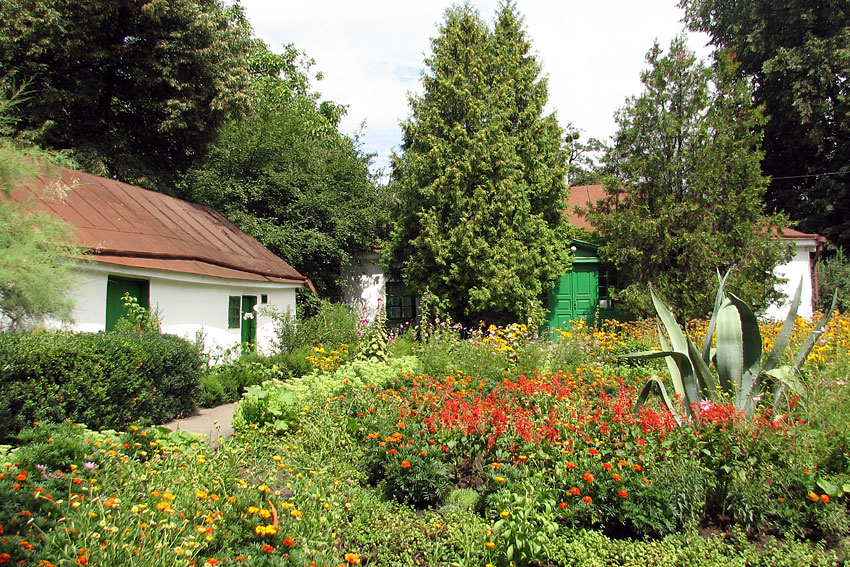
The house in Vinnytsia where Mykhailo Kotsiubynsky was born.

Kotsiubynsky grew up in Bar, Vinnitsa region and several other towns and villages in Podolia, where his father worked as a civil servant. He attended the Sharhorod Religious Boarding School from 1876 until 1880 and continued his studies at the Kamenets-Podolskii Theological Seminary, but in 1882 he was expelled from the school for his political activities within the populist movement. Influenced by the awakening Ukrainian national idea, Kotsiubynsky started his first attempts at writing prose in 1884 with the Ukrainian language story Andriy Soloveiko (Ukrainian: Андрій Соловейко). This first attempt by the young author was met with skepticism, and he did not make new attempts at writing for several years.

=== Early work and research ===
From 1888 to 1890, Kotsiubynsky was a member of the Vinnitsa Municipal Duma. In 1890, he visited Galicia, where he met several other Ukrainian cultural figures including Ivan Franko and Volodymyr Hnatiuk. It was there in Lviv that his first story Nasha Khatka (Ukrainian: Наша хатка) was published.

Later Kotsiubynsky worked as a private tutor in and near Vinnitsa. There, he could study life in traditional Ukrainian villages, which was something he often came back to in his stories including the 1891 Na Viru (Ukrainian: На віру) and the 1901 Dorohoiu tsinoiu (Ukrainian: Дорогою ціною).

During large parts of the years 1892 to 1897, Kotsiubynsky worked for a commission studying the grape pest phylloxera in Bessarabia and Crimea. During the same period, he was a member of the secret Brotherhood of Taras.

In 1898 Kotsiubynsky moved to Chernigov, where he worked as a statistician at the statistics bureau of the Chernigov zemstvo. He also was active in the Chernigov Governorate Scholarly Archival Commission and headed the Chernigov Prosvita society from 1906 to 1908.

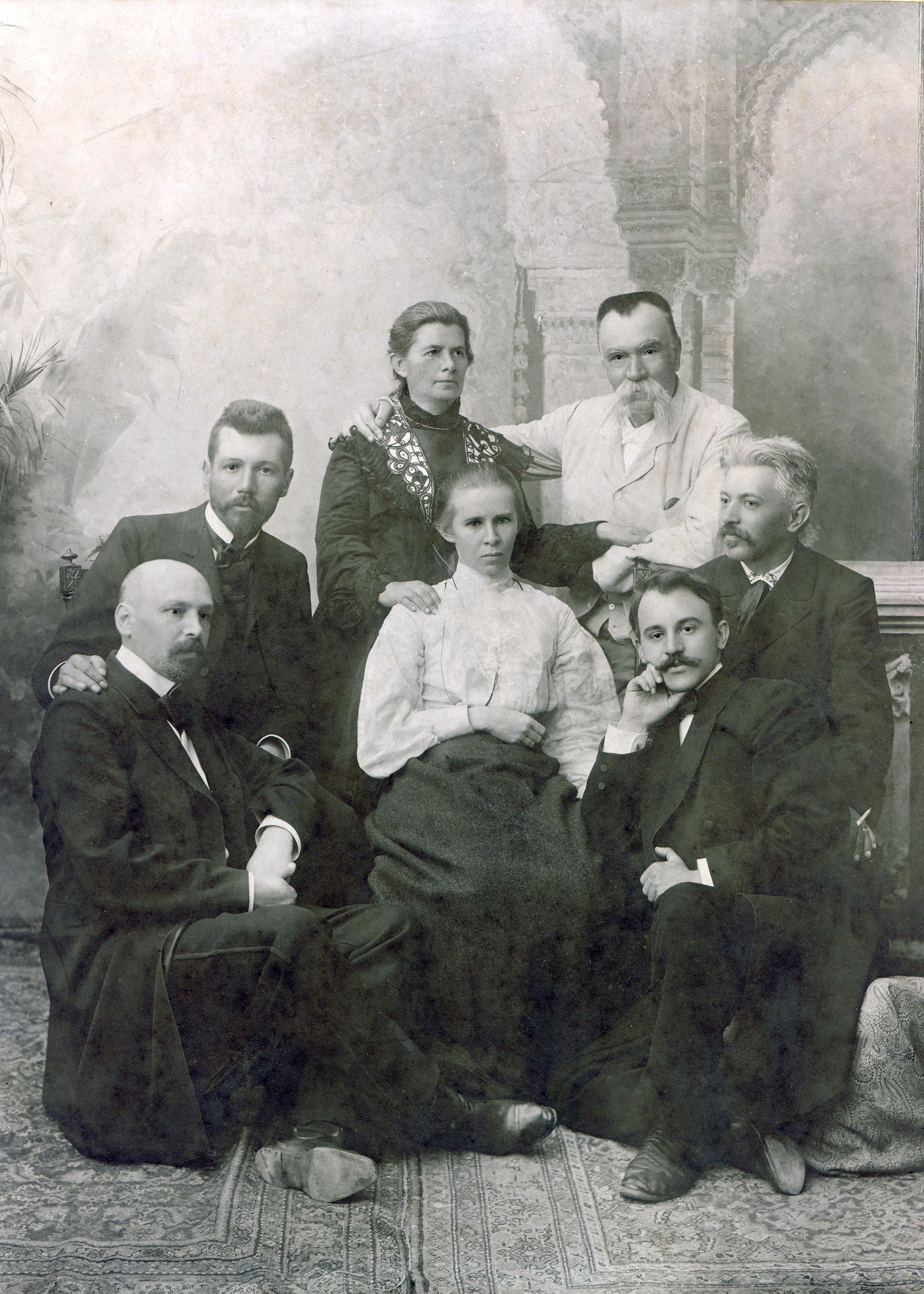
A group of Ukrainian writers gathered in Poltava to inaugurate a monument to Ivan Kotliarevsky, 1903. From left: Mykhailo Kotsiubynsky, Vasyl Stefanyk, Olena Pchilka, Lesya Ukrainka, Mykhailo Starytsky, Hnat Khotkevych, Volodymyr Samijlenko.

=== Death ===
Due to heart disease, Kotsiubynsky spent long periods at different health resorts on Capri from 1909 to 1911. During the same period, he visited Greece and the Carpathians. In 1911 he was granted a pension from the Society of Friends of Ukrainian Scholarship, Literature, and Art that enabled him to quit his job and solely concentrate on his writings, but he was already in poor health and died only two years later.

== Writings ==
At the age of 12, young Mykhailo fell in love with a 16-year-old girl, and in order to attract her attention, he decided to become a "great man", and for this began to read books with special zeal. Under the influence of works by Taras Shevchenko and Marko Vovchok he developed the desire to become a writer. Kotsiubynsky started his literary activities in the genre of ethnographic realism, influenced by Ivan Nechuy-Levytsky and populist ideas. Starting with the late 1890s, however, he started evolving into one of Ukraine's most prominent modernist writers.

After the Russian Revolution of 1905, Kotsiubynsky could be more openly critical of the Russian tsarist regime, which can be seen in Vin ide (Ukrainian: Він іде) and Smikh (Ukrainian: Сміх), both from 1906, and Persona grata from 1907. Fata Morgana, in two parts from 1904 and 1910, is probably his best-known work. Here he describes the typical social conflicts in the life of the Ukrainian village. Kotsiubynsky's work for the first time in Ukrainian literature engaged in deep study of psychology and included elements of impressionism, expressionism, neorealism and other literary trends of the time.

About twenty novels were published during Kotsiubynsky's life. Several of them have been translated into other European languages.

=== English translations ===
English translations of Mykhaylo Kotsyubynsky’s works include:

- Short stories, “On the Road” and “The Unknown One” (Tr. from Ukrainian by Roma Franko.);
- "Fata Morgana" (Tr. from Ukrainian by Arthur Bernhard.).

== Personal life and family ==
Serving as an ordinary clerk in the statistical department of the Chernigov administration, Kotsiubynsky always went to work with a flower in a boutonniere. In January 1896, Kotsiubynsky married Vira Ustymivna Kotsiubynska (nicknamed "Deisha"; 1863–1921).

One of his sons, Yuriy Mykhailovych Kotsiubynsky (1896–1937), was the Bolshevik and the Red Army commander during the 1917–1921 Civil War. Later, he held several high positions within the Communist Party of Ukraine, but in 1935, he was expelled from the party. In October 1936, he was accused of having counter-revolutionary contacts and together with other Bolsheviks have organized a Ukrainian Trotskyist Centre. The year after, he was sentenced to death and executed. He was rehabilitated in 1955. Yuri had a son Oleh. His daughter, Oksana Kotsyubynska, was married to Vitaliy Primakov. The fate of his other children, Roman and Iryna, is not known. His niece, Mykhailyna Khomivna Kotsiubynska (1931–2011), was a Ukrainian philologist and literary specialist. She was an honorary doctor of the Kyiv Mohyla Academy.

== Legacy ==
During the Soviet period, Kotsiubynsky was honoured as a realist and a revolutionary democrat. A literary-memorial museum was opened in Vinnytsia in 1927 in the house where he was born. Later, a memorial was created nearby the museum.

The house in Chernihiv where he lived for the last 15 years of his life was turned into a museum in 1934; the Chernihiv Regional Literary-Museum of Mykhailo Kotsiubynsky in Vinnytsia. The house contains the author’s personal belongings. Adjacent to the house is a museum, which opened in 1983, containing Kotsiubinsky’s manuscripts, photos, magazines and family relics as well as information about other Ukrainian writers.

Several Soviet movies have been based on Kotsiubynsky’s novels such as Koni ne vynni (1956), Dorohoiu tsunoiu (1957) and Tini zabutykh predkiv (1967). In 1970 Dovzhenko Film Studios made a feature biographical film "The Kotsyubynsky Family".
