= Rostyslav Martyniuk =

Ukrainian journalist (born 1971)

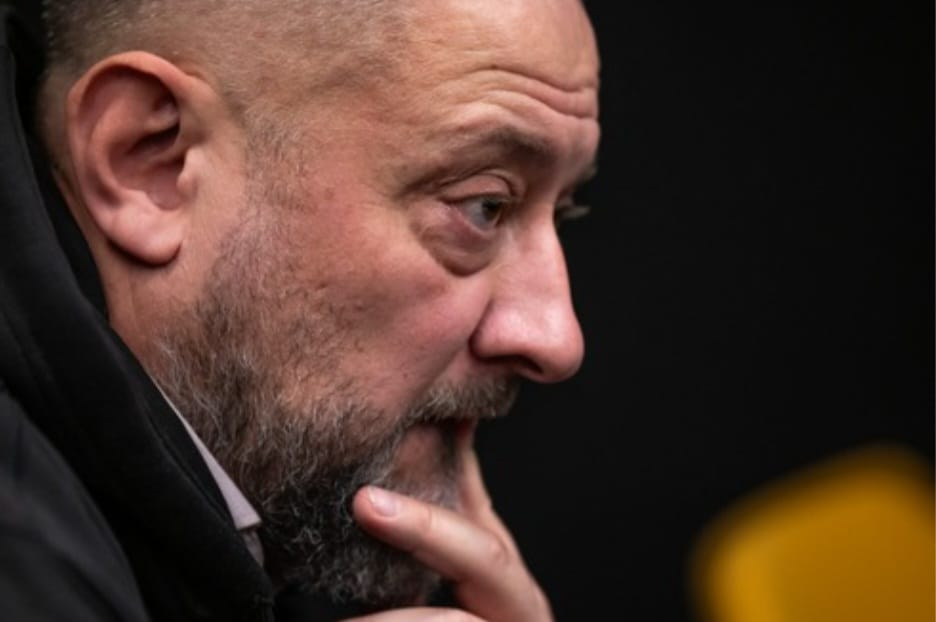
- Rostyslav Martyniuk in 2024
- Born: Rostyslav Mykhailovych Martyniuk; June 5, 1971 (age 54); Sumy, Ukrainian Soviet Socialist Republic, USSR
- Occupations: Journalist; film producer; historian
- Years active: 1995–present

Rostyslav Mykhailovych Martyniuk (Ukrainian: Ростислав Михайлович Мартинюк; born June 5, 1971) is a Ukrainian journalist, television and film producer, political consultant, and researcher of Eastern Finno-Ugric ethnicities.

Chairman of the supervisory board of the Geroika Charitable Foundation, which locates and maintains Ukrainian military graves. Executive Director of the production studio Eurasia Media. Author of television programs dedicated to humanitarian policy and figures of Ukrainian history of the 19th–20th centuries, the phenomenon of Ukrainian Cossacks. Producer of several Ukrainian feature films. Expert of the Ukrainian Cultural Foundation (since 2023).

In 2014–2020, he was a member of the Expert Council of the Ukrainian State Film Agency; in 2004–2016, he served as editor of the Ukrainian-language website of Finno-Ugric news ugraina.org and editor of the print edition Ugraina, the official publication of the Kyiv Society of the Culture of the Peoples of the Finno-Permic Group.

Father Deacon of the Orthodox Church of Ukraine.

== Biography ==
Rostyslav Martyniuk was born in 1971 in Sumy, Ukraine (then part of Soviet Union). His ancestors were Ukrainian Cossacks of the Pryluky Regiment of the Hetmanate.

In 1988, he enrolled at Voronezh State University in the Russian Federation, majoring in history. He participated in Ukrainian political demonstrations in Moscow.

In 1995, he returned to Ukraine and became a prominent figure in the youth nationalist movement in the city of Sumy, joining the circle of leaders of Ukrainian Youth Association “Sumshchyna”. In the newspaper Hrono, he published essays on the history of Erzyan Mastor, Udmurtia, and Eastern Sloboda Ukraine.

In 1998, he moved to Kyiv, where he initially worked for Kyiv's 7th Channel television and later for the First National Channel and Channel 5.

In February 2005, he launched the first Ukrainian-language Finno-Ugric news website, ugraina.org, where he promoted the concept of the Finno-Ugric origins of the Russians.

== Cinema ==
Martyniuk served as co-producer of the feature film Atlantis by director Valentyn Vasyanovych, which in September 2019 won the award for Best Film in the Horizons section of the 76th Venice International Film Festival.

He also co-produced Taras Tomenko's historical drama Slovo House, which won the Grand Prix at the International Film Festival in Košice in 2022. On 24 February 2023, a special screening of the film was held in the Chamber of the Seimas of Lithuania in Vilnius, marking the anniversary of Russia's full-scale invasion of Ukraine. Martyniuk presented the film to the screening's participants.

In 2025, the world premiere is planned for Ideal Friend, a short film by director Serhii Alioshechkin, co-produced by Martyniuk. The film is the first in the history of Ukrainian cinema to explore the theme of artificial intelligence.

=== Filmography ===
- 2019: "Atlantis" — co-producer (director Valentyn Vasyanovych)
- 2021: "Slovo House" — co-producer (director Taras Tomenko)
- 2023: "My War" (documentary series) — co-producer
- 2025: "Ideal Friend" (short) — co-producer (director Serhii Alioshechkin)
