= Slovo House =

2017 documentary film

Slovo House (Ukrainian: «Будинок "Слово"», romanized: Budynok 'Slovo') is a 2017 Ukrainian documentary film directed by Taras Tomenko and written by Lyuba Yakimchuk. The film shows the history of a controversial house designed for Ukrainian cultural figures, one that had many amenities, but also extensive network of surveillance, which negatively affected the psychic of many of its inhabitants.

The Ukrainian premiere of the film took place on October 27, 2017 in Kharkiv, Ukraine. The film participated in the official competition program of the 33rd Warsaw International Film Festival in 2017.

In 2018, the film won the Ukrainian National Film Award "Golden Dzyga" in the category "Best Documentary"

== Plot ==
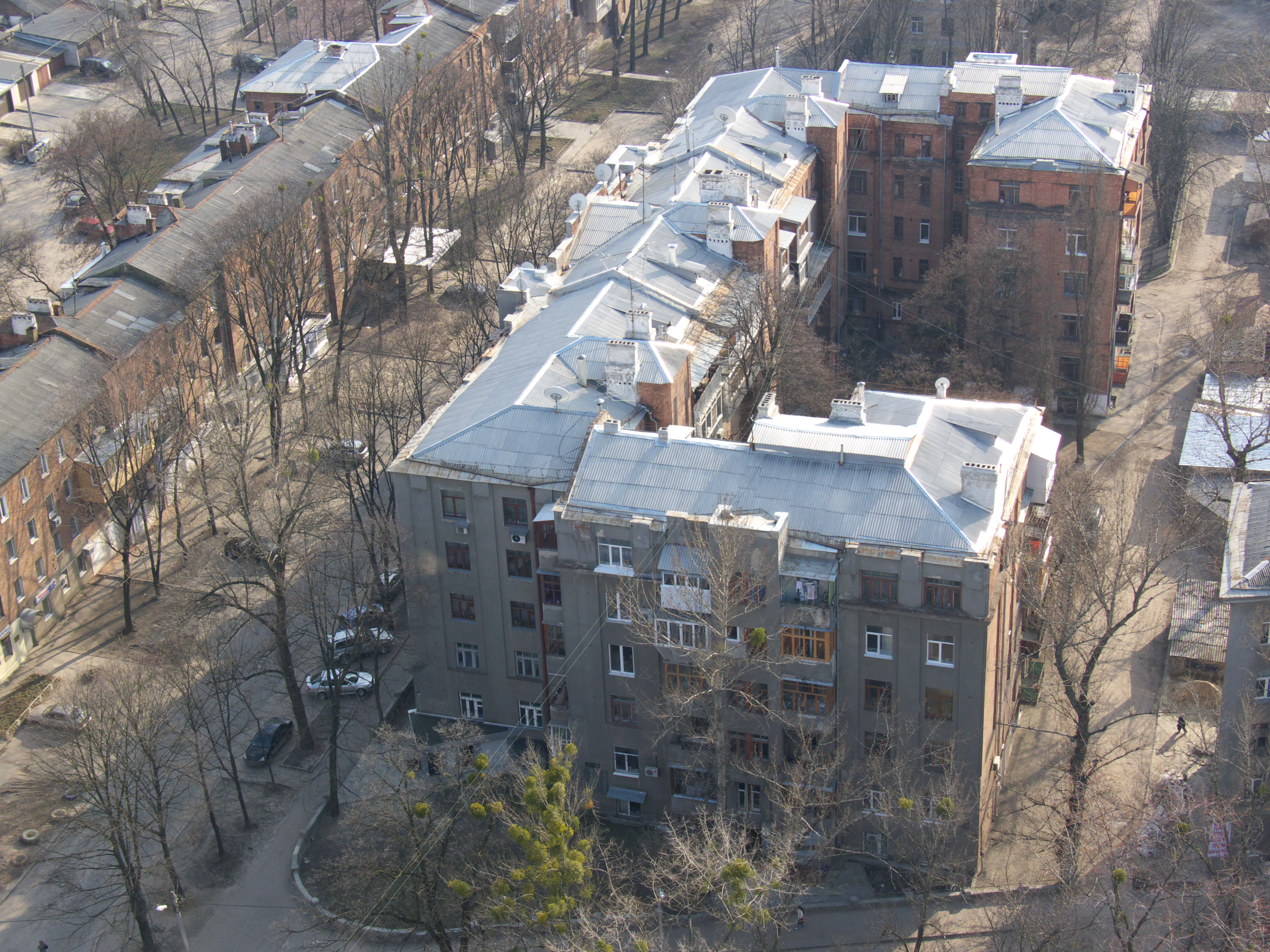
Slovo House, Kharkiv, Ukraine

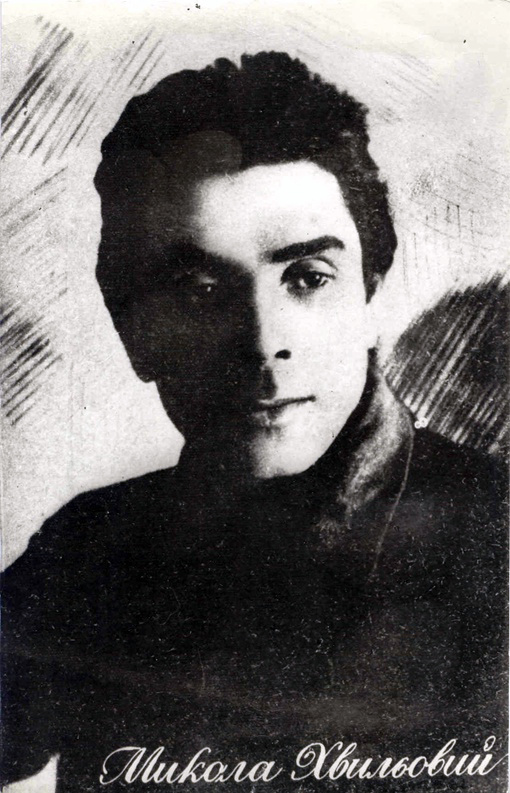
Mykola Khvylovy, one of the famous poets who were in the house

In the late 1920s, a house was built in Kharkiv, then the capital of the Ukrainian Soviet Socialist Republic, according to Stalin, especially for Ukrainian writers and other cultural figures of the USSR. It was designed by Kharkiv city architect Mykhailo Dashkevych. Everything was provided there for the convenience of residents - spacious bright rooms, high ceilings, large windows. They even built a park nearby so that those who lived there would have a place to relax. Sixty-four comfortable apartments, a dining room, a solarium, staff - a real paradise for writers. Dozens of Ukrainian writers, artists, actors, including Mykola Khvylovy, Ostap Vyshnya, Mykhaylo Semenko, Anatol Petrytsky, Antin Dyky were relocated to this new building or writer's house.

However, this paradise was equipped with a special surveillance system and a network of agents, thanks to which the authors were kept under control by the Soviet secret services. In particular, some writers were reported by their own wives, agents, and some by maids. All who visited this house were also under this control, among them - Bertolt Brecht, Theodore Dreiser, Bruno Jasieński, who came to Kharkiv for the International Conference of Revolutionary Writers in 1930. Ukrainian writers witnessed the effects of the Holodomor of 1932–33, and as a result their situation worsened.

Some writers committed suicide, some went insane. During the Stalinist repressions, residents of forty apartments out of sixty-three were arrested. The building was called Slovo, because the building itself was shaped like the cyrillic letter "C" (pronounced "S" in English). But for several years this house was called "Crematorium" or "house of pre-trial detention."

== Actors (voices) ==
| • Boris Volodymyrovych Georgievsky |
• Hanna Yevhenivna Levchenko
| • Mykhailo Vozniuk |
• Olha Vasylivna Radchuk
• Serhii Solopai
• Oleksandr Zavalskyi

== Production ==
The film project became one of the winners of the 7th competitive selection by the Ukrainian State Film Agency (Derzhkino), receiving state financial support in the amount of 800,000 UAH. The total production cost of the film amounts to 1,200,000 UAH. The film was produced by Fresh Production Group with the support of Derzhkino.

=== Production crew ===
- Screenwriters – Lyuba Yakimchuk and Taras Tomenko
- Film director – Taras Tomenko
- Film Producers – Yuliia Cherniavska and Oleg Shcherbyna
- Associate Producer – Yurii Pavlenko
- Camera operators – Taras Tomenko and Oleksandr Yakymchuk
- Composer – Alla Zagaykevych
- Consultant – Yaryna Tsymbal
- Audio engineer – Kateryna Herasymchuk

== Release ==
=== Television and Home Video Release ===
The television premiere of the film took place on May 17, 2018, on TRK Ukraina. On July 1, 2018, the film was released on the VOD platform Megogo. Prior to that, it had already become available on several other VOD platforms, including iTunes, Google Play, Amazon, Vimeo, and JMan.tv.

== Reviews ==
Ukrainian film critics and cinema experts responded positively to the film. The head of the Ukrainian State Film Agency, Pylyp Illenko, praised the film, noting that before filming began, the creators conducted extensive archival research, which helped uncover new and previously unpublished unique facts. Illenko also commended the film's artistic quality, highlighting how the filmmakers successfully combined contemporary and archival footage in an organic manner.

A reviewer from the publication Texty also gave the film a favorable review, praising its educational value and its role in helping to reintegrate these repressed Ukrainian artists into the public discourse.

== Awards and nominations ==
| Award | Ceremony Date | Category | Nominee(s) | Result | Source |
|---|---|---|---|---|---|
| Golden Dzyga | April 20, 2018 | Best Documentary Film | Slovo House | 🏆 Won | |
| | April 20, 2018 | Best Composer | Alla Zagaykevych | 🏅 Nominated | |
| Kinokolo National Film Critics Award | October 26, 2018 | Best Documentary Film | Slovo House | 🏅 Nominated | |

== See also ==
- Slovo Building
- Slovo House (2021 film)
- Executed Renaissance
