= Serhii Alioshechkin =

Ukrainian filmmaker

- Сергій Альошечкін
- Born: Serhii Anatoliiovych Alioshechkin; September 28, 1974 (age 51); Tokmak, Zaporizhzhia Oblast, Ukrainian SSR, Soviet Union
- Education: Kyiv National I. K. Karpenko-Kary Theatre, Cinema and Television University
- Occupation: Filmmaker
- Notable work: Ideal Friend (2025 short film)

Serhii Anatoliiovych Alioshechkin (Ukrainian: Сергій Анатолійович Альошечкін; September 28, 1974) is a Ukrainian film and television director, cinematographer, screenwriter, and actor.

== Early life and education ==
Alioshechkin was born on September 28, 1974, in Tokmak, Zaporizhzhia Oblast. He is the brother of Ukrainian film directors Oleksandr Alioshechkin and Viacheslav Alioshechkin.

In 1999, he graduated from the Kyiv State Institute of Theatre, Cinema and Television (now Kyiv National I. K. Karpenko-Kary Theatre, Cinema and Television University), having studied in the masterclass of celebrated director Yuri Ilyenko. While still a student, he directed the short film Nekropoltsi‑2, which received an award from the Kyiv Department of Culture at the "Open Night" film festival in 1999.

After graduation, he worked in various jobs—including as a loader, guard, and blacksmith at the National Museum of Folk Architecture and Folkways of Ukraine (Pyrohiv)—before entering the film and television industry. He also appeared in a supporting role as Menshikov in Yuri Ilyenko's feature A Prayer for Hetman Mazepa (2001).

== Career ==
His directorial debut came in 2004 with the supernatural short thriller Hoverla, starring Pylyp Illenko. That led to television work under producer Valentyn Opaliev. From 2005 to 2014, he directed nearly twenty television films and drama series for both Ukrainian and Russian TV networks.

=== Morena ===
In 2016, Alioshechkin began development of his first feature film, the folk-horror Morena. In 2017, the project won state support through the 9th Ukrainian State Film Agency selection. Principal photography took place in August 2017 in Carpathian locations. Alioshechkin served as director, screenwriter, and cinematographer . Although production finished in October 2018, the world premiere came only in June 2024 at the Mykolaichuk Open Film Festival in Chernivtsi. The film caused a sensation among audiences. In August 2024, Morena received the top prize at the Tokyo Horror Film Festival as Best Feature Film. It was theatrically released in Ukraine in December 2024.

=== Ideal Friend ===
On 16 June 2025, Alioshechkin's sci‑fi short Ideal Friend had its special preview at the Mykolaichuk Open Film Festival in Chernivtsi. He served as director, cinematographer, and co‑screenwriter of the film. It is considered to be the first Ukrainian short to tackle artificial intelligence and was named “one of the best Ukrainian short sci‑fi” by Film. UA's promo producer Dmytro Maistrenko, with critics likening it to the series Black Mirror. Its world premiere is scheduled later in 2025.

== Filmography ==
Year	Type	Title	Original title	Credited as				Notes
Year	Type	Title	Original title	Director	Cinematographer	Scriptwriter	Actor	Notes
1998	Short film	Nekropoltsi-2	Некропольці-2	Yes	—N/a	—N/a	—N/a	
2001	Feature film	A Prayer for Hetman Mazepa	Молитва за гетьмана Мазепу	No	No	No	Yes	Played a supporting role
2001	Short film	SOS – Emergency Rescue Service	SOS – Служба оперативного спасіння	Yes	—N/a	—N/a	—N/a	
2004	Short film	Hoverla	Говерла	Yes	Yes	Yes	—N/a	Thriller
2005	Television show	Healing with Love	Зцілення коханням	Yes	No	No	No	Romance
2005	Television show	The Right to Love	Право на кохання	Yes	No	No	No	Romance, Ukrainian-Russian co-production
2006	Television show	Five Minutes to the Metro	П'ять хвилин до метро	Yes	No	No	No	Romance
2006	Television show	She-Wolf	Вовчиця	Yes	No	No	No	Romance, Ukrainian-Russian co-production
2008	Television show	Another Chance	Ще один шанс	Yes	No	No	No	Romance
2008	Television film	Dependence Day	День залежності	Yes	No	No	No	Mystery
2009	Television film	A House for Two	Будинок для двох	Yes	No	No	No	Romance
2009	Television show	A Totally Different Life	Зовсім інше життя	Yes	No	No	No	Romance
2010	Television show	The Cuckoo	Зозуля	Yes	No	No	No	Romance
2011	Television show	Let Them Talk	Нехай говорять	Yes	No	No	No	Romance
2011	Television show	Medicine for Grandma	Ліки для бабусі	Yes	No	No	No	Romance
2012	Television show	If I Were a Tsarina...	Кабы я была царица...	Yes	No	No	No	Romance, Russian production
2012	Television film	Alibi-Hope, Alibi-Love	Алиби-надежда, алиби-любовь	Yes	No	No	No	Romance, mystery, Russian production
2012	Television film	Late Love	Поздняя любовь	Yes	No	No	No	Romance, Russian production
2013	Television show	Simple Life	Простая жизнь	Yes	No	No	No	Romance, Russian production
2014	Television show	Troubled Precinct	Беспокойный участок	Yes	No	No	No	Mystery, crime, Russian production
2024	Feature film	Morena	Морена	Yes	Yes	Yes	No	Horror, comedy
2025	Short film	Ideal Friend	Ідеальний друг	Yes	Yes	Yes	No	Sci-fi

== See also ==
- Cinema of Ukraine
