= Slovo Building =

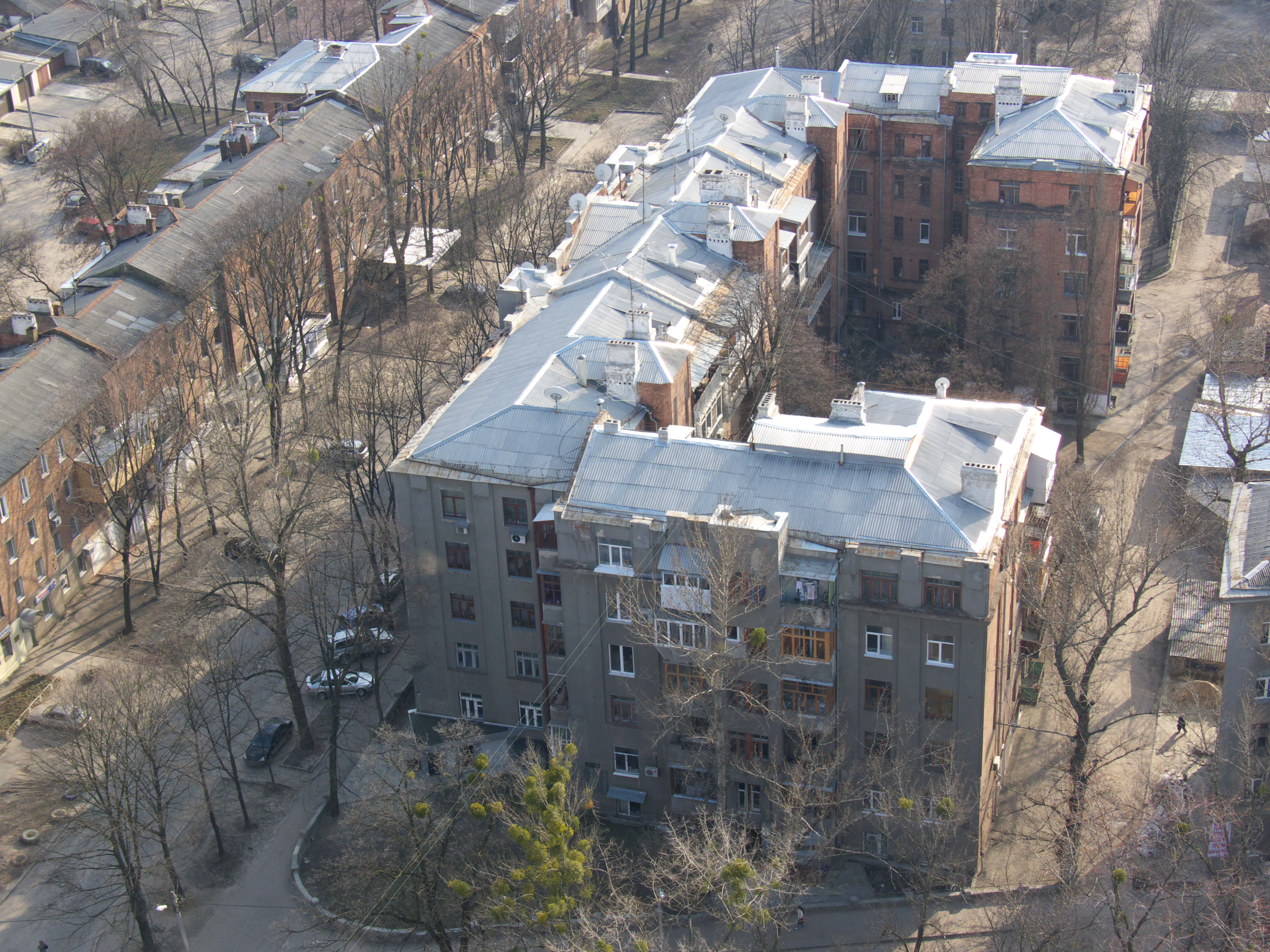
- Interactive map of the Slovo Building area

General information
- Location: Shevchenkivskyi District, Kharkiv, Ukraine
- Coordinates: 50°00′42″N 36°14′03″E

Immovable Monument of National Significance of Ukraine
- Official name: Житловий будинок “Слово” (Slovo residential building)
- Type: History
- Reference no.: 200032

The Slovo Building (Ukrainian: Будинок «Слово») is a residential, multi-story building in the Shevchenkivskyi District of Kharkiv. The shape of the building reflects the letter С (S in the Ukrainian language), the first letter of слово (slovo) or "word". The shape of the building symbolized its construction to house prominent Ukrainian writers, who lived there in over sixty apartments. Built in the late 1920s, it accommodated Ukrainian writers and poets, many of whom were later shot by the Communist authorities at Sandarmokh in Karelia, Russia. Today they are known as the "Executed Renaissance".

== Construction ==
Kharkiv was the capital of the Ukrainian Soviet Socialist Republic from 19 December 1919 to 24 June 1934, and the city became the center of the Ukrainian economy. Its population grew rapidly from 285,000 in 1920 to 423,000 in 1927, and housing shortages became a major problem.

This affected the literary community, which had moved to Kharkiv from Kyiv because of the Ukrainization policy. Writers who could not afford the higher cost of housing lived in their offices or improvised homes: some poorly-housed writers stored their manuscripts in pots to keep mice from nibbling at the paper. One writer who lived at his office was Pavlo Tychyna after he became chief executive of the Chervony Shliakh magazine in 1923.

In the mid-1920s, Ostap Vyshnya, at that time part of a writers' organization called плуг, meaning the "Plough", asked the Soviet government to build an apartment complex to accommodate the most important Ukrainian intellectuals. The idea was almost immediately approved by the Soviet authorities, who saw it as a way to keep tabs on the Ukrainian intellectuals, who would all live in the same building. The new complex was designed in September 1927 by architect Mytrophan Dashkevych, who designed the building in the shape of the letter C in the Cyrillic alphabet to stand for the first letter of слово, meaning word, and the building was named Слово (Slovo). As the building still lacked funds to complete its construction, Vyshnya went to Moscow in February 1929 and asked Joseph Stalin to fund the construction. Stalin agreed and gave the money the same day (on the condition that the residents paid it back within 15 years). The Slovo Building was completed on 25 December 1929.

It was built in lavish fashion by contemporary standards. Each apartment had 3–5 rooms, which was luxurious for the interwar Soviet Union. Five storeys high, the Slovo Building contained 66 apartments made of the best materials then available. A solarium and a shower were built on the roof, with a preschool kindergarten in the basement. Late in 1929, the residents moved in although the central heating was not installed until after New Year's Day 1930. They were nicknamed Slovyans by others. Each apartment had its own bathroom, central heating system, and telephones. Artists were given studios in the building. After the "Great Patriotic War", an elevator was installed, providing access only to the ground and fifth floors.

The building was slightly damaged by a Russian shelling on March 7, 2022, during the Russian invasion of Ukraine.

== Executed Renaissance ==
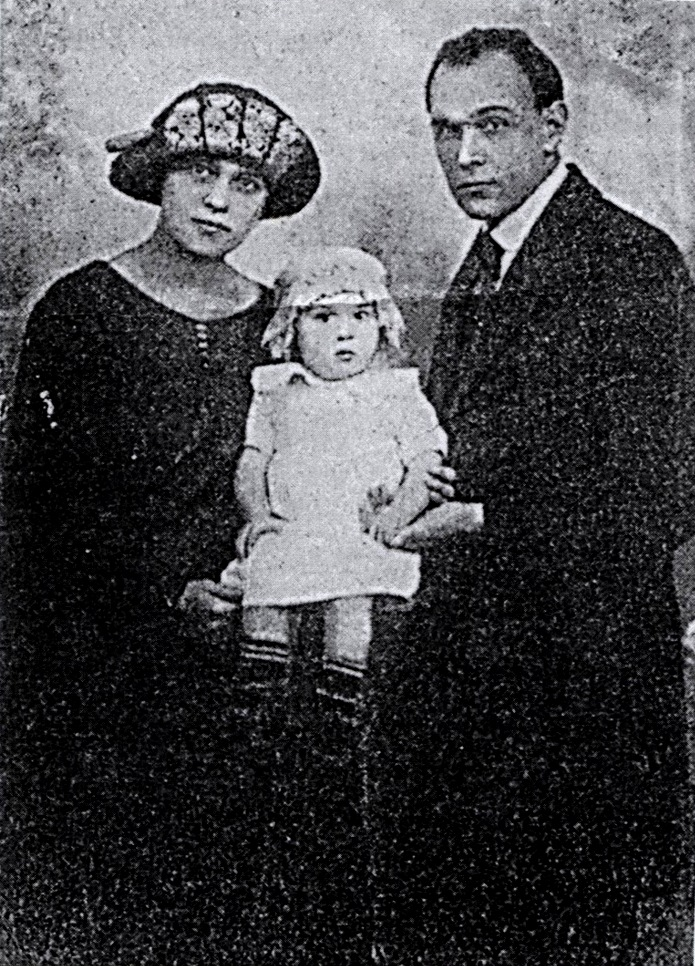
Klym Polishchuk with his wife Halyna Mnevska and daughter Lesia

Through the tapping of telephones and other methods, the occupants of the Slovo Building were kept under close surveillance and in constant danger of being reported by their neighbors and arrested. Actress Halyna Mnevska was the first to be arrested on 20 January 1931 because she did not want to denounce her husband, Klym Polishchuk; in 1937 he was shot at Sandarmokh in Karelia. Mnevska was arrested and sentenced to five years imprisonment; she would never be allowed to return to Ukraine. The second to be arrested was Pavlo Khrystiuk on 2 March 1931, and on 16 March 1932, a third resident of the Slovo Building Ivan Bahrianyi was arrested because of his counter-revolutionary movement. Their fate paralleled that of the residents of the House on the Embankment in Moscow.

As the years passed, more and more arrests were made. The largest number was in 1933. Ukrainian writer, Mykhailo Yalovy was arrested on 12 May 1933, accused of espionage and planning to assassinate the first secretary of the Kharkiv Party Committee Pavel Postyshev; he would be later to be executed at Sandarmokh on 11 March 1937. The day after Yalovy's arrest, Mykola Khvylovy, Mykola Kulish, and Oles Dosvitniy met to discuss what was going on. During their conversation, Khvylovy returned to his room. There he shot himself on 13 May 1933, revealing the despair the occupants of the Slovo Building now felt. Not only did they live under constant threat of arrest or death, the country was also living through the man-made famine of the Holodomor. The writer Serhiy Pylypenko was executed without trial on 23 February 1934. Others were arrested and sent to the Solovki prison camp in the White Sea: Les Kurbas, Ostap Vyshnya, Mykola Kulish, and Hryhorii Epik. Subsequently, they were all executed at Sandarmokh, except for Vyshnya (Cherry) who survived because he was ill. Forty of the 66 apartments in the Slovo Building were affected. A total of 33 tenants were executed; five were sentenced to long terms of imprisonment in the Gulag; one committed suicide and another died in unclear circumstances. Many were accused and convicted of being "spies" and "terrorists" and of "conspiring" against the Soviet regime.

In 1934, the capital moved from Kharkiv to Kyiv, partly due to the famine or Holodomor and to the arrests, imprisonment and executions. The surviving writers moved to the RoLit (Russian Literature) Apartment Block in the new capital of Soviet Ukraine. When the Germans started to bomb Kyiv in 1941 during the "Great Patriotic War" people commented, "One bomb on RoLit would be enough, and Ukrainian literature will cease to exist."

== Remembrance ==
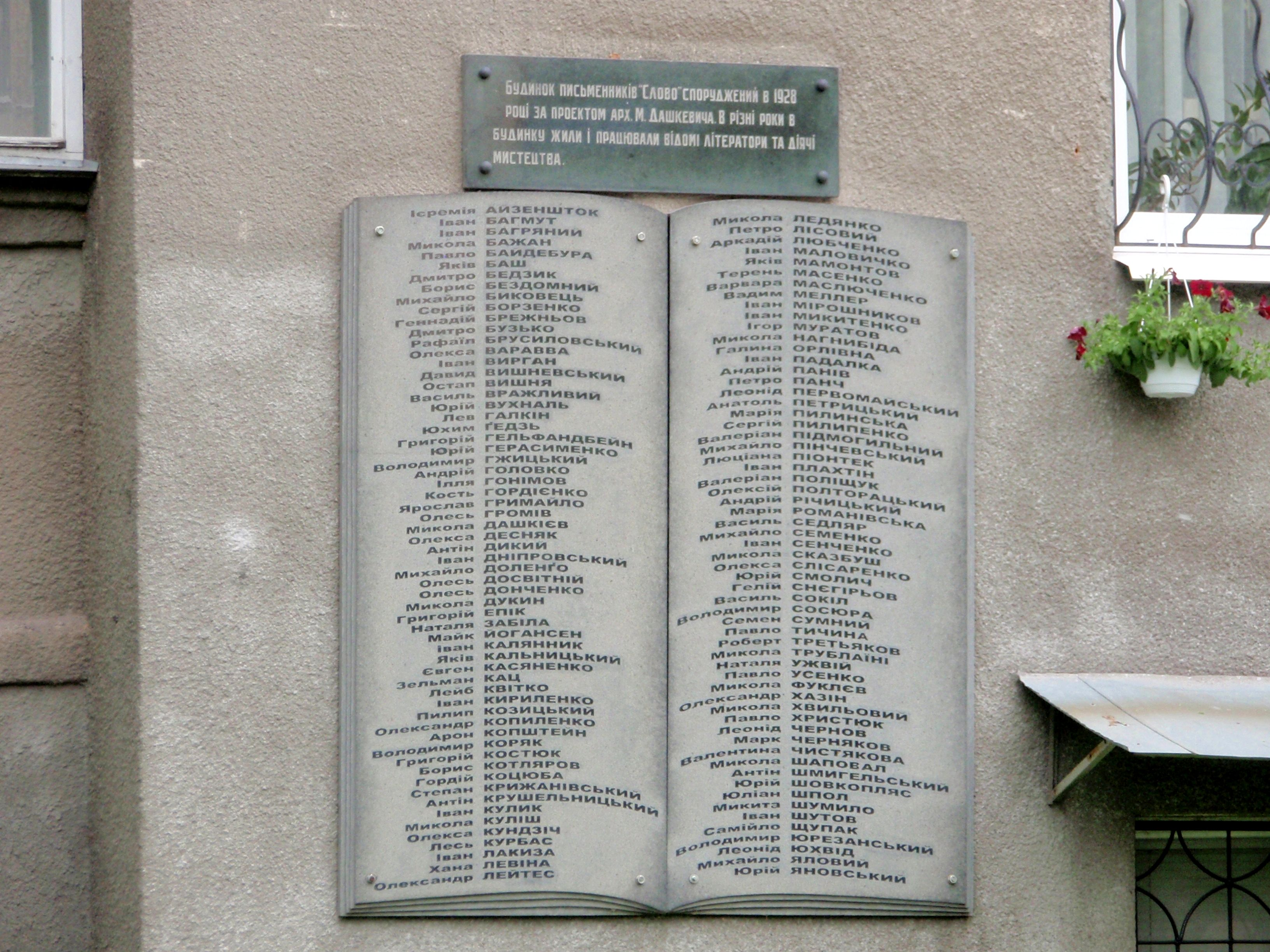
Memorial plaque consist of writer and artist who resides in the building

On 21 August 2019, the Slovo Building was added to the State Register of Immovable Monuments of Ukraine. A memorial plaque recording the names of all its famous inhabitants was added to the building on 24 August 2003, replacing an old plaque which had already been destroyed.

- Jeremiah Eisenstock
- Ivan Bagmut
- Ivan Bahrianyi (1906–1963)
- Mykola Bazhan (1904–1983)
- Pavlo Baidebura
- Jacob Bash
- Dmitro Bedzyk
- Boris the homeless
- Mykhailo Bykovets
- Sergey Borzenko
- Gennady Brezhnev
- Dmitry Buzko
- Raphael Brusylovsky
- Alexey Petrovich
- Ivan Virhan
- David Vyshnevsky
- Ostap Vyshnya (1889–1956)
- Vasily Vrazhlivy
- Yuriy Vukhnalʹ
- Lev Galkin
- Yukhym Gedz
- Gregory Gelfandbein
- Yuri Gerasimenko
- Vladimir Gzhitsky
- Andriy Golovko
- Ilya Gonimov
- Kost Hordiyenko
- Yaroslav Grimailo
- Oles Gromiv
- Mykola Dashkiev
- Oleksa Desnyak
- Antin Dykyy
- Ivan Dniprovsky
- Mykhailo Dolengo (1896–1981)
- Oles Dosvitniy
- Oles Donchenko
- Mykola Dukin
- Hryhorii Epik (1901–1937, shot at Sandarmokh)
- Natalia Zabila
- Mike Johansen (1895–1937, shot at Sandarmokh)
- Ivan Kalyannik
- Jacob Kalnytsky
- Eugene Kasyanenko
- Zelman Katz
- Leib Kvitko (1890–1952, shot in Moscow)
- Іvan Kirilenko
- Pylyp Kozytskiy
- Alexander Kopylenko
- Aaron Kopstein
- Vladimir Koryak
- Hryhoriy Kostyuk
- Boris Kotlyarov
- Gordiy Kotsyuba
- Stepan Kryzhanivsky
- Antin Krushelnytsky (1878–1937, shot at Sandarmokh)
- Ivan Kulyk (1897–1937, shot in Kyiv)
- Mykola Kulish (1892–1937, shot at Sandarmokh)
- Oleksa Kundzich
- Les Kurbas (1887–1937, shot at Sandarmokh)
- Ivan Lakiza
- Khan Levin
- Alexander Leites
- Mykola Ledyanko
- Petro Lisovyy
- Arkadiy Lyubchenko
- Іvan Malovichko
- Yakiv Mamontiv
- Teren Masenko
- Varvara Maslyuchenko
- Vadym Meller
- Іvan Miroshnikov
- Ivan Mykytenko
- Igor Muratov
- Mykola Nagnybida
- Halyna Orlivna
- Ivan Padalka (1894–1937, shot)
- Andriy Paniv
- Petro Panch
- Leonid Pervomayskiy
- Anatol Petrytsky
- Maria Pylynska
- Sergey Pylypenko
- Valerian Pidmohylny (1901–1937, shot at Sandarmokh)
- Mykhailo Pinchevsky
- Luciana Piontek
- Ivan Plakhtin
- Valerian Polishchuk
- Alexey Poltoratsky
- Andriy Richytsky
- Maria Romanivska
- Vasily Sedlyar
- Mikhail Semenko (1892–1937, ?shot at Sandarmokh)
- Ivan Senchenko
- Mykola Skazbush
- Oleksa Slisarenko
- Yuriy Smolych
- Heliy Snyehirʹov
- Vasily Sokil
- Volodymyr Sosiura
- Sumnyy Semen Makarovych
- Pavlo Tychyna
- Robert Tretyakov
- Mykola Trublaini
- Natalia Uzhviy
- Pavlo Usenko
- Mykola Fuklev
- Alexander Khazin
- Mykola Khvylovy (1893–1933, committed suicide)
- Pavlo Khrystiuk (1880–1941, Sevvostlag)
- Leonid Chernov
- Маrk Chernyakov
- Valentina Chistyakova
- Mykola Shapoval
- Antin Shmygelsky
- Yuri Shovkoplias
- Nikita Shumilo
- Ivan Shutov
- Samylo Shchupak
- Vladimir Yurezansky
- Leonid Yukhvid
- Mykhailo Yalovy (1895–1937, shot at Sandarmokh)
- Yuri Yanovsky

== Memorial project ==
In March 2017, the ProSlovo Project was launched across Ukraine. The research project is dedicated to Slovo House and its past residents. All results, memoirs, and images are being published on a web page in interactive form. In English or Ukrainian, the audience can observe the timeline of the building, 3D visualization of each apartment, photographs of each resident, maps, and memoirs. In 2017, a documentary film about this building was also released. It was written by Liubov Yakymchuk and Taras Tomenko; it was directed by Tomenko. The film "Slovo House" included a walkthrough of each apartment accompanied by memoirs and eyewitness accounts.

In the game "Будинок СЛОВО" (Slovo Building), created by the Kharkov Literary Museum, Maryna Kutsenko, and Olga Cheremska, players act as residents of the house during the 1930s.

== See also ==
- Executed Renaissance (the shooting of Ukrainian poets, writers, dramatists and artists, 1934–1938)
- The Executed Renaissance Anthology, Kultura publishers: Paris (1959)
- Rolit
- Slovo House (2017 film)
- Slovo House (2021 film)

== Sources ==
- http://proslovo.com/kulish-slovoproslovo
- https://www.balcanicaucaso.org/eng/Areas/Ukraine/Ukraine-Slovo-from-house-of-the-word-to-nightmare-201601
- https://warsawinstitute.org/slovo-house/
- http://euromaidanpress.com/2020/03/12/slovo-house-how-a-special-soviet-apartment-block-for-writers-became-their-prison/
