= Valeriya Khodos =

Ukrainian actress, director, and screenwriter

- Валерія Ходос
- Born: November 19, 1986 (age 39); Kyiv, Ukraine SSR, USSR
- Education: Kyiv National I. K. Karpenko-Kary Theatre, Cinema and Television University
- Years active: 2006–present

Valeriya Ihorivna Khodos (Ukrainian: Валерія Ігорівна Ходос, IPA: [wɐˈlɛr⁽ʲ⁾ijɐ ˈiɦor⁽ʲ⁾iu̯nɐ ˈxɔdos]; born November 19, 1986) is a Ukrainian actress, director, and writer known for her work in film, television, and theater. She was born in Kyiv, then part of the Ukrainian SSR in the Soviet Union.

Khodos graduated from the Kyiv National I. K. Karpenko-Kary Theatre, Cinema and Television University and began her screen career in 2006 with a minor role in the film The Secret of St. Patrick. She has since become a notable figure in contemporary Ukrainian cinema. In 2016, she gained wider recognition for her lead role as Kateryna Shvets in the historical miniseries Kateryna, and for her appearance in the internationally distributed feature film Bitter Harvest (2017), set during the Holodomor of the 1930s.

== Early life and education ==
Khodos was born in Kyiv on November 19, 1986. During her first year at university, at the age of 18, she experienced the tragic loss of her mother, who was killed in a New Year's Eve car accident caused by a drunk driver. Her father later remarried to a woman named Svitlana and she gained two new stepbrothers.

From a young age, Khodos was said to have always been active in the performing arts. In school, she participated in the school choir, was in a drama circle, and studied piano at a music school for ten years. According to Khodos in her interviews, her defining moment came in the 10th grade when she attended a production of Bulgakov's Master and Margarita at the Ivan Franko Theater. In the interview, Khodos recalled that seeing the actors on stage made her realize that "my place was right there with them," and thus, she resolved to become an actress.

After graduating from high school, Khodos passed the exam to the Kyiv National University of Theater, Cinema, and Television (the Karpenko-Kary Institute) on her first try. At the Karpenko-Kary Institute, Khodos studied acting (in theater and film). She graduated in 2009.

== Career ==
=== 2000s: Stage debut and early film roles ===
After graduating from the Kyiv National University of Theatre, Film and Television in 2009, she made her professional stage debut at the Kyiv National Academic Molodyy Theatre in the play Голубка (Colombe) by Jean Anouilh, earning a nomination for Best Acting Debut at the Kyiv Pectoral awards in 2008. Upon graduation, she joined the theater's full-time ensemble.

Khodos also appeared in her first film roles during this period, including a part in the 2009 Ukrainian comedy В Париж! directed by Serhiy Krutin. She was quickly recognized as a rising talent in Kyiv's theatrical community and was cast in major classical and contemporary stage productions.

=== 2010s: Rise to prominence on stage and screen ===
Throughout the 2010s, Khodos became a prominent figure in Ukrainian theater and television. At the Kyiv National Academic Molodyy Theatre, she portrayed leading roles such as Portia in The Merchant of Venice (2010, directed by Stanislav Moiseyev), and performed in a wide range of productions. In 2012, she was awarded the Bronislaw Buchma Prize (also known as the "Broniek" prize) for Best Actress.

In addition to her theater work, Khodos began transitioning to screen acting. She appeared in various Ukrainian television dramas, including Папараці (2016) and Катерина (2016), where she played the title role. Her performances on television were noted for their emotional intensity, and she became a familiar face on national networks such as STB and 1+1.

Khodos left the Molodyy Theatre in 2015 and began working independently, expanding her work in television and cinema. In 2019, she starred in Зникла наречена (The Missing Bride) and Вибір матері (Mother's Choice), further establishing her as a lead actress in TV melodramas and thrillers.

=== 2020s: Directing, coaching, and continued screen success ===
In 2020, Khodos made her directorial debut with the short film Dependence (Залежність), a psychological thriller which she co-wrote and starred in. The film received critical acclaim and came in runner-up for the category "Best Ukrainian Short Film" at the Brukivka International Film Festival. In interviews, Khodos described the experience as transformative and stated that directing had become a central interest in her creative work. That same year, she founded the Khodos Acting School in Kyiv, where she began teaching courses on camera acting.

On television, Khodos continued to take on challenging roles. In 2021, she portrayed twin sisters in the STB series Незакрита мішень (Open Target), a performance that was praised for its depth and complexity. In 2024, she appeared in the 1+1 series Ніхто не ідеальний (Nobody's Perfect), portraying Mariya Bagrativna.

In cinema, she took on a key role in Будинок “Слово”: Нескінченний роман (House “Slovo”: Unfinished Novel), directed by Taras Tomenko, portraying Raisa Troyanker. She also appeared in the 2021 sci-fi drama Простір (Space) and has stated she plans to direct a feature-length film in the near future (as of 2025).

=== Selected filmography ===
Film
Year	Film name
2009	В Париж! (To Paris!)
2011	Лекарство для бабушки (Medicine for Grandma)
2012	Любовник для Люси (Lover for Lucy)
2015	Плохая соседка (Bad Neighbor)
2018	Родная кровь (Native Blood)
2020	Зависимость (Dependence)
2021	Простір (Space)
2021	Будинок “Слово”: Нескінченний роман (Slovo House: Unfinished Novel)

Television
Year	Television Series Name
2013	Ловушка (Trap)
2014	Женский доктор 2 (Women's Doctor 2)
2014	Ветреная женщина (Windy Woman)
2015	Клан ювелиров (Clan of Jewelers)
2015	Не зарекайся (Never Say Never)
2016	Папарацци (Paparazzi)
2016	Катерина (Kateryna)
2017	Хороший парень (Good Guy)
2017	Вторая жизнь Евы (The Second Life of Eva)
2019	Вибір матері (Mother's Choice)
2019	Зникла наречена (The Missing Bride)
2021	Незакрита мішень (Open Target)

== Personal life ==
Early in her career, Khodos predominantly worked in Russian-language productions. Following the 2014 annexation of Crimea, she continued to participate in projects within Russia. However, after the full-scale invasion of Ukraine on February 24, 2022, she adopted a pro-Ukrainian stance, transitioning to using the Ukrainian language in her work and ceasing collaborations with Russian productions and even starting a petition to ban Russian actors in Ukraine. Since then, Khodos has been actively involved in supporting Ukrainian military efforts, organizing fundraisers and participating in initiatives aimed at aiding the country's defense and humanitarian needs.

== Awards ==
In 2012, Khodos received the Bronislaw Buchma Prize (Премія імені Амвросія Бучми) for Best Actress in Theater. This award, named after the esteemed Ukrainian actor Amvrosiy Buchma, recognizes outstanding achievements in theatrical arts.

Afterwards, Khodos won the Jury Prize for Best Ukrainian Short Film at the Brukivka International Film Festival for her short film Dependence (Залежність), which she co-wrote, directed, and starred in.
