= Slovo House (2021 film) =

2021 feature film

- Directed by: Taras Tomenko
- Release dates: October 2021 (Warsaw Film Festival); 9 May 2024
- Country: Ukraine
- Language: Ukrainian

Slovo House: Unfinished Novel (Ukrainian: «Будинок „Слово“: Нескінчений роман», romanized: Budynok "Slovo": Neskinchenyi roman) is a Ukrainian feature film directed by Taras Tomenko. The film presents a dramatic story of Ukrainian writers who were gathered under one roof and forced to work in the name of the Soviet system. It is a story about how a communist paradise turned into a communist hell.

The world premiere of the film took place in 2021 at the 37th Warsaw Film Festival. The Ukrainian premiere was held in Chernivtsi on 17 June 2022 at the Mykolaichuk OPEN Festival. The film was released in cinemas on 9 May 2024.

== Plot ==
In 1927, a special residential building was constructed in Kharkiv on Stalin's orders. The best Ukrainian artists—poets, writers, painters, and directors—settled there. At that time, merely being offered a place in this building was already a mark of high recognition for any creative figure. One day, a newcomer appears. He works as a newspaper proofreader and dreams of joining the ranks of the leading writers. To secure a place in the building, he needed a very particular talent—the talent to eavesdrop and report everything he heard to an NKVD agent.

== Cast ==
- Dmytro Vikulov as Ostap Vyshnya
- Borys Heorhiyivskyi
- Ihor Hniezdilov
- Eugene Hütz
- Denys Drachevskyi
- Ostap Dziadek as Vasil Sedlyar
- Vyacheslav Dovzhenko as Mykola Khvylovy
- Oleh Ivanytsia as a guest from Germany (Bertolt Brecht), who highly praised the work Komunary, allegedly authored by Akimov
- Andriy Isaienko as Maik Yohansen
- Maryna Koshkina as Halia, a cafeteria worker at the "Slovo" House
- Slava Krasovska as Natalia Uzhviy
- Yevhen Lamakh as Ivan Bahrianyi
- Andrii Mai as Volodymyr Sosiura
- Nina Naboka as Valia, a cafeteria worker at the "Slovo" House
- Yurii Odynokyi as Mener, an NKVD officer
- Dmytro Oliinyk as Volodymyr Akimov
- Dmytro Orlov
- Anzhelika Petrovska as a flower seller
- Hennadii Popenko as Mykhail Semenko
- Vasyl Tokar as Mykhas Semenko, son of Mykhail Semenko
- Tiana Reis
- Svitlana Salatska
- Olena Svitlytska as Valentyna Chystiakova
- Serafima
- Anna Sokolova
- Stanislav Suknenko as Les Kurbas
- Kostiantyn Temliak as Pavlo Tychyna
- Roman Khalaiimov as Arkadii Liubchenko
- Valeriya Khodos as Raіsa Troianker
- Yuliia Chepurko as Mariia Sosiura
- Dmytro Chernov as Ivan Mykytenko
- Denys Shchatskyi
- Oleksandr Yarema as a guest from Germany
- Roman Yasinovskyi as Hryhorii Epik

== Production ==
The historical drama "Slovo" House: Unfinished Novel was directed by Taras Tomenko and co-written by Tomenko and Lyuba Yakimchuk. In 2017, Tomenko directed the documentary Slovo House, which inspired him to further explore the era and its key figures. The feature film project was among the winners of a Ukrainian State Film Agency (Derzhkino) competition and received state funding covering half of the production costs.

According to screenwriter Lyuba Yakimchuk, "It’s a drama with elements of a detective story. (...) The film depicts Soviet intelligence operations and the secret mechanisms of their work (we studied this based on historical intelligence manuals), the urban life of Kharkiv with its theatres and cafés, and in one episode, a Ukrainian village during the Holodomor." "After the full-scale invasion, there has been a huge demand for information about the generation of the 1920s, about the Executed Renaissance," Yakimchuk said, adding: "Some may hear these writers' names for the first time in the film. I hope this will encourage more interest and that people will want to read their works."

=== Budget ===
The film project was one of the winners of the 10th competitive selection by the Ukrainian State Film Agency. The amount of state financial support was ₴30,022,698, which accounted for half of the film's total production cost.

== Public response ==
The film caused a stir at the Kharkiv MeetDocs festival held at the Zhovten Cinema in Kyiv, where all tickets for one screening were sold out, prompting the organizers to add an extra showing that also sold out. On 24 February 2023, the film was screened in the Seimas of Lithuania in Vilnius. The event marked the anniversary of Russia's full-scale invasion of Ukraine. The film was presented by producers Pylyp Illenko, Oleh Shcherbyna, and Rostyslav Martynyuk.

Film critic Ihor Kromph called Taras Tomenko's feature-length directorial debut "one of the best historical dramas in contemporary Ukrainian cinema." Journalist Yurii Lukanov noted: "This is where a problem arises in how the material is perceived. Inventing behind-the-scenes episodes that are unverifiable but logically fit the storyline is not problematic. However, when fabricated events are presented as historical facts that are easily verifiable, it can undermine the credibility of the entire film, especially for viewers who are not deeply familiar with the historical context." Publicist Vitaly Portnikov viewed the film as an opportunity to reflect on the residents of the Slovo House as people who "tried to create and succeed under conditions of de facto loss of statehood."

Vitalii Hordiienko, author of the YouTube channel Zahin Kinomaniv, emphasized that the screenwriting team sacrificed the stories of real figures of the Executed Renaissance in favor of the fictional character Akimov, and noted the static development of the character Mykola Khvylovy throughout the film.

== Awards ==
At the International Film Festival in Košice, held from 8 to 10 June 2022, the film won the award for Best Feature Film.

In November 2022, the film received four awards at the I Will Tell International Film Festival in Florida, USA.

On 1 June 2024, Metropolitan Epiphanius of Kyiv, the Primate of the Orthodox Church of Ukraine, met with the film's creators at his residence and presented church honors to the filmmakers and benefactors of the project.

== See also ==
- Slovo Building
- Slovo House (2017 film)
- Executed Renaissance

== Sources ==
- Якимчук, Любов (17 May 2024). "З чого ми збудували «Будинок "Слово"». Відповідаючи глядачам". Ukrainska Pravda.
- ""Будинок "Слово". Про що фільм". BBC News Україна (in Ukrainian). 2024-05-10.
- Кокотюха, Андрій (2024-05-17). "Знищені митці в попкультурі: а чому б і ні?". detector.media (in Ukrainian).
- Suspilne Kultura (2024-05-25). Що ми маємо знати про Розстріляне відродження? Огляд на «Будинок "Слово". Нескінчений роман» – via YouTube.
- Шалені авторки (2024-06-05). Що за фасадом «Будинку "Слово"» | Шалені авторки | Віра Агеєва, Ростислав Семків – via YouTube.
- Семеняк В. Будинок «Слово» - пастка для письменників// "Вільне життя плюс". - 2024.- 19 червня.
