= Kakha Tilidze =

Georgian fighter in the Russo-Ukrainian War (1985–2025)

Kakha Tilidze კახაბერ (კახა) ტილიძე
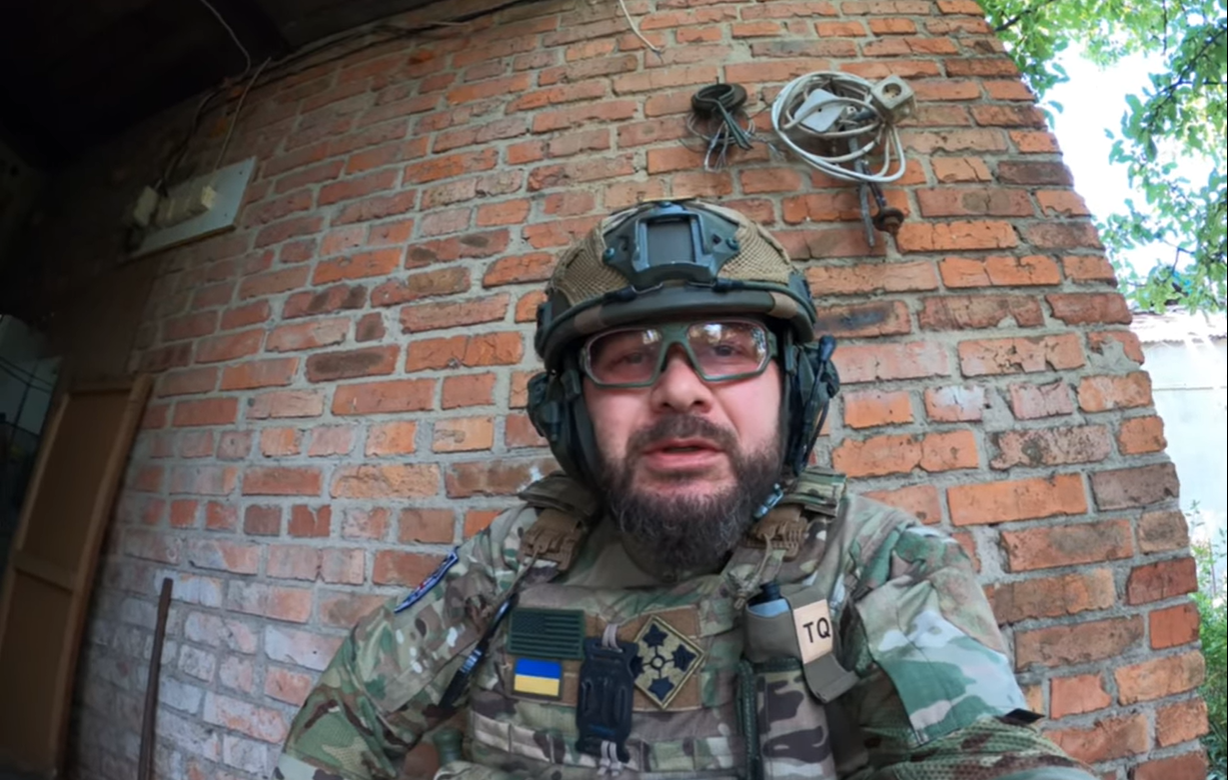
- Born: 12 January 1985; Zemo Alvani, Kakheti, Georgian SSR
- Died: 11 January 2025 (aged 39); Zaporizhzhia Oblast, Ukraine
- Burial place: Saburtalo Pantheon, Tbilisi, Georgia
- Children: 2
- Military career
- Allegiance: Special State Security Service of Georgia, United States Armed Forces, Ukrainian Armed Forces
- Service years: 2008–2025
- Units: Azov Regiment (2014), Solidarity special unit of Main Directorate of Intelligence (2022–2025)
- Conflicts: Russo-Ukrainian War; Russian invasion of Ukraine; Battle of Bakhmut; Kursk campaign; Battle of Zaporizhzhia

Kakhaber (Kakha) Tilidze (Georgian: კახაბერ (კახა) ტილიძე; 12 January 1985 – 11 January 2025) was a Georgian, American, and Ukrainian soldier, a special forces operator, who served as deputy commander of the Solidarity special unit of the Main Directorate of Intelligence of the Ministry of Defence of Ukraine (2022–2025). He was a participant in the Russo-Ukrainian War.

== Biography ==
Tilidze was born in the village of Zemo Alvani in Akhmeta Municipality (Kakheti).

From 2008 to 2013, he served as a personal security detail of the President of Georgia, Mikheil Saakashvili. According to the then head of the Georgian State Security Special Service, Teimuraz Janashia, Tilidze was referred to as an “exemplary officer" who rose to the position of senior protection officer.

In 2014, after the end of Saakashvili's presidential term, he emigrated to the United States. Soon after obtaining the right to live and work there, he brought his wife and child to join him. He lived in the states of New York and Connecticut and held a well-paid job.

In 2014, he traveled from the United States to Ukraine as a volunteer, where he took part in combat operations in the War in Donbas as a member of the Azov Regiment.

He later returned to the United States, where he continued his military career. In 2021, he completed the Ranger School. In 2022, he received certification and soon volunteered for Ukraine for the second time.

=== Russian invasion of Ukraine ===
Tilidze arrived in Ukraine in late May 2022, where he joined the Solidarity special unit of the Main Directorate of Intelligence of the Ministry of Defence of Ukraine. Initially, he served as an instructor, helping train Ukrainian soldiers. He also purchased equipment for fighters at his own expense. Later, he became deputy commander of the unit under Zaza Nanuashvili.

Tilidze and his unit carried out a number of successful operations against Russian forces. In particular, he took part in the Kursk operation conducted by Ukrainian defence forces on Russian territory in the summer of 2024.

On social media, he frequently posted videos from the front lines and commented on current events in Georgia. In May 2024, while in Kharkiv Oblast, he recorded a video address to Georgian special forces involved in dispersing the anti-government protests, urging them to fight against the “common enemy” rather than peaceful demonstrators.

In July 2024, he was in Kyiv during the missile strike on the Okhmatdyt children's hospital and took part in clearing the rubble.

=== Death ===
On 11 January 2025, Tilidze was killed in action fighting Russian forces on the Zaporizhzhia front. Details of his final battle were described by a comrade in a comment to Radio Free Europe/Radio Liberty:

Kakha led a group of five fighters engaged in continuous combat for a day and a half. During evacuation, two men were seriously wounded. Kakha was also wounded, but lightly. He did not leave the wounded behind, but their injuries were so severe that both died. When the evacuation began and Kakha managed to get into the evacuation vehicle, at that moment it was hit by a kamikaze drone.

Tilidze died at the scene. His body remained on the battlefield for 48 hours. It was recovered on the second attempt by a group led by the commander of the Solidarity unit, Zaza Nanuashvili.

On 15 January, a funeral service was held at St. Michael's Golden-Domed Monastery in Kyiv.

On 18 January, his body was returned to Georgia. On 21 January, Kakha Tilidze was buried in Tbilisi, at the Saburtalo Pantheon.

He was survived by two children.

== Commemoration ==
In January 2025, murals dedicated to Kakha Tilidze appeared on Zandukeli and Asatiani streets in Tbilisi.

On 1 September 2025, Ukrainian film director Taras Tomenko stated in an interview with Berliner Zeitung that he was working on a documentary film about Tilidze and other fighters of the Solidarity unit. The film was in the editing stage.

== Awards ==
- Vakhtang Gorgasali Order, 3rd class (Georgia)
- Order of Honor (Georgia)
- Star of Glory (Ukraine) — the highest award of the Main Directorate of Intelligence of the Ministry of Defence of Ukraine (2025, posthumously)
