= Prokhorivka =

Rural locality in Cherkasy Oblast, Ukraine

Prokhorivka Прохорівка
- Location in Cherkasy Oblast
- Coordinates: 49°42′46″N 31°36′49″E
- Country: Ukraine
- Oblast: Cherkasy Oblast
- Raion: Cherkasy Raion
- Hromada: Lipliave rural hromada
- Time zone: UTC+2 (EET)
  - Summer (DST): UTC+3 (EEST)
- Postal code: 19023

Prokhorivka (Ukrainian: Прохорівка) is a village in the Lipliave rural hromada of the Cherkasy Raion of Cherkasy Oblast in Ukraine.

== History ==
The first written mention of the village was in 1622. It is marked on Guillaume de Beauplan's map.

On 19 July 2020, as a result of the administrative-territorial reform and liquidation of the Kaniv Raion, the village became part of the Cherkasy Raion.

== Notable residents ==
- Yuri Ilyenko (Yurii Illienko; 1936–2010), Ukrainian film director, screenwriter, cinematographer and politician
- Mykhailo Maksymovych (1804–1873), professor in plant biology, Ukrainian historian and writer
- Ya'akov Uri (1888–1970), Israeli politician

In the village visited Taras Shevchenko and Mykola Hohol.
