= Ideal Friend =

Ukrainian short drama film

- Ukrainian: Ідеальний друг
- Directed by: Serhii Alioshechkin
- Written by: Serhii Alioshechkin, Maksym Chernysh
- Produced by: Pylyp Illenko, Rostyslav Martyniuk
- Starring: Anzhelika Petrovska, Didier Marouani
- Cinematography: Serhii Alioshechkin
- Music by: Oleksandr Chornyi
- Production company: Illienko Film Productions
- Release date: 2025
- Country: Ukraine
- Languages: Ukrainian; English

Ideal Friend (Ukrainian: «Ідеальний друг») is a 2025 Ukrainian short science‑fiction film directed by Serhii Alioshechkin. It is the first Ukrainian film to explore the theme of artificial intelligence. A special pre‑premiere screening was held on 16 June 2025 during the Mykolaichuk Open film festival in Chernivtsi. The film's world premiere is expected later in 2025.

== Plot ==
Stranded after a shipwreck, Alice tries to survive, relying on a super‑intelligent AI assistant implanted in her ear. As the machine calculates her best chances of survival, Alice begins to question the consequences of human dependency on technology.

== Cast ==
- Anzhelika Petrovska as Alice
- Didier Marouani as Greg – cameo by the French electronic music pioneer and leader of the band Space

== Production ==
According to co‑producer Pylyp Illenko, the project was funded privately by the Petrovskyi family. Principal photography took place on Cyprus and in Paris.

== Reception ==
Organizers of the 4th Mykolaichuk Open named the film one of the most anticipated entries. Dmytro Maistrenko, promo‑producer at FILM.UA, called it “one of the best Ukrainian short sci‑fi films” and compared its tension to that of the British series Black Mirror. The festival’s programming director, Alex Malyshenko, said it could gain traction on genre festivals abroad.
