= A Spring for the Thirsty =

1965 Ukrainian film

- Криниця для спраглих
- Directed by: Yuri Ilyenko
- Written by: Ivan Drach
- Starring: Dmitri Milyutenko; Larisa Kadochnikova; Nina Alisova; Dzhemma Firsova
- Cinematography: Yuri Ilyenko; Volodymyr Davidov
- Edited by: Natalia Akayomova; Oleksandr Sizonenko
- Music by: Leonid Hrabovsky
- Production company: Dovzhenko Film Studios
- Release date: 1965
- Running time: 73 minutes
- Country: USSR
- Languages: Ukrainian, Russian

A Spring for the Thirsty (Ukrainian: «Криниця для спраглих», romanized: Krynytsya dlya sprahlikh; Russian: «Родник для жаждущих», romanized: Rodnik dlya zhazhdushchikh), sometimes translated into English as A Well for the Thirsty, is a Soviet surrealist film completed in 1965 but not released until 1987. The Dovzhenko Film Studios production was the directorial debut for Yuri Ilyenko, from a script written by Ivan Drach. Due to censorship from the Communist Party of Ukraine, the premiere of the film was delayed for 22 years until the implementation of perestroika. A Spring for the Thirsty has been called among the most significant early films of the Ukrainian poetic cinema movement, and in 2021 it was named the 21st best Ukrainian film ever by the National Oleksandr Dovzhenko Film Centre.

== Plot ==
The almost entirely silent film is split into five parts and follows Levko Serdyuk, an elderly peasant who lives alone on the edge of a desert, his wife and eldest son having died, and his younger children having moved away to the city. Levko continues to take part of a local spring which once provided water for the entire village, though now he is the only resident left. Levko sends a telegram to his family informing them of his death and makes a coffin out of his kitchen table in which he waits impatiently for death to take him. Levko looks at photographs and recollects the history of his life, including his children leaving home; his wife dying; and his eldest son, a soldier, being killed in action. Levko laments the way metropolitan ways of life have changed the way of life of the peasantry. He is visited by the spirit of his late wife Solomiya. To try to forget his memories, Levko turns his photographs to face the wall. Levko asks his son to return to the village, but when he comes, he feels a spiritual distance between them. At the end of the film, he finds out his daughter-in-law has given birth to a son, the child of his deceased older son. Levko cleans an abandoned well and plants an apple tree next to it.

== Cast ==
- Dmitri Milyutenko as Levko Serdyuk
- Larisa Kadochnikova as Solomiya
- Feodosiya Litvinenko as Chornukha
- Nina Alisova as Paraska
- Dzhemma Firsova as Maria
- Ivan Kostyuchenko as Sydir
- Yevhen Baliyev as Maxim
- Yuri Mazhuha as Peter
- Olena Kovalenko as Natalka
- Kostyantin Yershov as Artem
- Nataliya Milyutenko as Nastya

== Production ==
A Spring for the Thirsty was the directional debut for Ilyenko, as well as Drach's first credit as a screenwriter. Ilyenko had previously received acclaim for his work as a cinematographer on the 1965 film Shadows of Forgotten Ancestors, directed by Sergei Parajanov. In addition to directing, Ilyenko was also credited as the cinematographer of A Spring for the Thirsty, alongside Volodymyr Davidov. The film's minimal sounds and music were produced by Leonid Hrabovsky, and it was edited by Nataliya Akayomova and Oleksandr Syzonenko. The film is notable for its lack of sound, with limited use of noise, including the sound of the wind and the voice of a scolding grandmother. Recurring motifs within the film included sand, water, and trees, which have been described as serving as metaphors for oblivion, life, and continuation, respectively. A Spring for the Thirsty marked the penultimate screen performance of Dmitri Milyutenko, who died in 1966; due to the film's 22-year delay in being released, it served as Milyutenko's final film release.

== Censorship and eventual release ==
Following the completion of the film's production, A Spring for the Thirsty was quickly banned by the Central Committee of the Communist Party of Ukraine. A resolution accused Ilyenko of being "inexperienced" and as a result permitting "ideological perversions" to be featured in the film. It has been claimed that Parajanov, after seeing the film for the first time, compared Ilyenko to Alexander Dovzhenko and called A Spring for the Thirsty "a huge victory for cinema... so what that it is anti-Soviet?", which allegedly inadvertently alerted the KPU of the film's existence and content.

Following the rise of perestroika in the 1980s, A Spring for the Thirsty was finally screened in November 1987 at the Ukrainian Film Festival in Zaporizhzhia. Outside of the USSR, it screened at the International Film Festival Rotterdam in 1992. The 21st century has seen retrospectives of the film in the former USSR, including at the Kyiv International Film Festival in 2007 and the Moscow International Film Festival in 2011.

== Reception ==
A Spring for the Thirsty has received critical acclaim for its simplicity, its black and white cinematography, and its innovative use of sound, though it has been both praised and criticised for alienating audiences due to its abstract and surrealist themes. TV Guide gave the film 3.5 out of 4, calling it "an abstract visual work and not for the average moviegoer... a colossal treasure for those who appreciate the majestic power of simplicity".

Arzamas said "it was difficult to imagine a film that is more non-Soviet in aesthetics", and attributed this, in addition to its ideological and moral content, as a reason for its censorship by the Soviet government. Vera Svyachuk of Suspilne Kultura believed Soviet censors had noticed something "dangerously Ukrainian" about the film. Leonid Hrabovsky, the film's composer, said in a 2022 interview that he believed the film had been censored due to it portraying themes considered to be "anti-Soviet", including poverty and the impact of the Holodomor on the Ukrainian people.
