= Nina Alisova =

Soviet actress (1915–1996)

- Нина Алисова
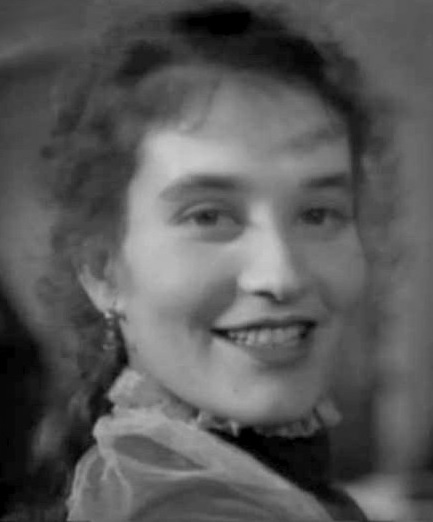
- Alisova in 1936
- Born: 15 December 1915; Kyiv, Russian Empire
- Died: 12 October 1996 (aged 80); Moscow, Russia
- Resting place: Troyekurovskoye Cemetery
- Education: Gerasimov Institute of Cinematography
- Occupations: Theater and film actress
- Years active: 1927-1996
- Awards: Stalin Prize; Order of the Red Banner of Labour; Medal "In Commemoration of 100th Lenin's Anniversary; Medal "For Valiant Labour in the Great Patriotic War 1941–1945"; Medal "Veteran of Labour"

Nina Ulianovna Alisova (Ukrainian: Ніна Улянівна Алісова, Russian: Нина Ульяновна Алисова) (15 December 1915 in Kyiv – 12 October 1996 in Moscow) was a Soviet theater and film actress. Honored Artist of the RSFSR (1950). She died and was buried in the Troyekurovskoye Cemetery.

== Selected filmography ==
- Without a Dowry (1937)
- Rainbow (1944)
- Ivan Pavlov (1949)
- The Lady with the Dog (1960)
- A Spring for the Thirsty (1965)
- Shadows of Forgotten Ancestors (1965)
- Torrents of Steel (1967)
- Shirli-myrli (1995)
