= Lyudmyla Yefymenko =

Ukrainian actress and filmmaker

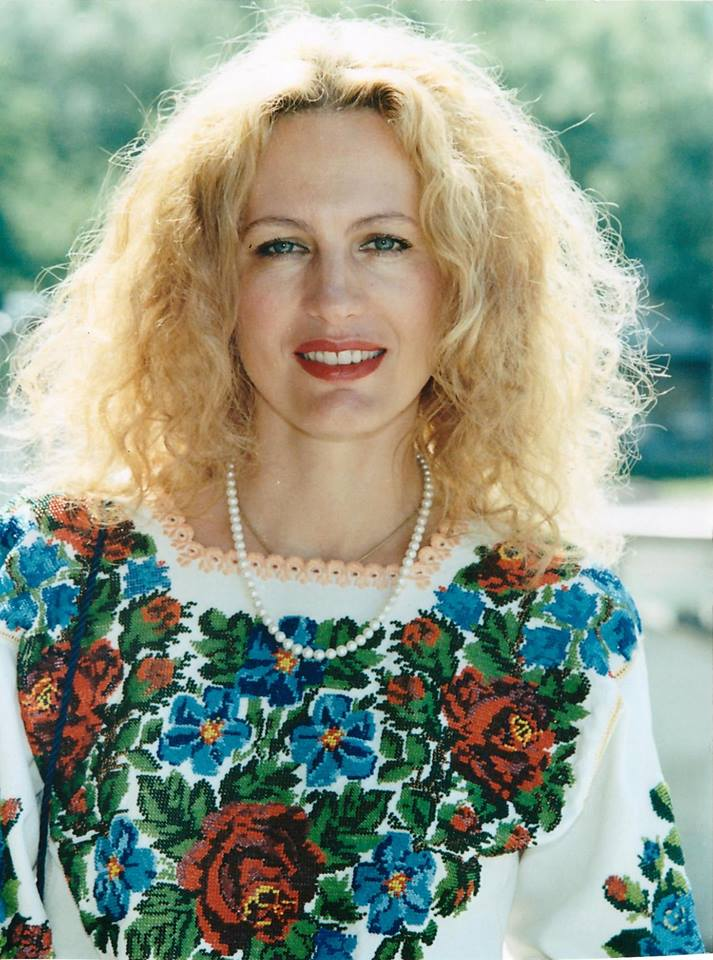
- Born: Lyudmila Pylypivna Yefymenko; 25 September 1951 (age 74); Kyiv, Ukrainian SSR, Soviet Union
- Occupations: Actress; Film director
- Spouse: Yuri Ilyenko (died 2010)
- Children: 2; including Pylyp Illenko

Lyudmyla Pylypivna Yefymenko (Ukrainian: Людмила Пилипівна Єфименко; born 25 September 1951) is a Ukrainian film actress and film director. She is recipient of the awards Merited Artist of Ukraine, People's Artist of Ukraine, and Order of Princess Olga.

== Early life ==
Yefymenko was born to Pylyp and Hanna Yefymenko on 25 September 1951 in Kyiv. She graduated from the acting faculty of the Gerasimov Institute of Cinematography in 1972.

== Career ==
Since 1972, Yefymenko has been working at Dovzhenko Film Studios in Kyiv. She made her film debut in the film Random Address and has since played more than two dozen roles, including the main role in the film The Legend of Princess Olga and as the wife of Vasyl Kochubey in the film Prayer for Hetman Mazepa. Yefymenko also wrote and directed the film Ave Maria (1999).

Yefymenko is a member of the Ukrainian Association of Cinematographers.

== Personal life ==
Yefymenko was married to fellow director Yuri Ilyenko and they had two sons, Andriy Ilyenko (born 1987) and Pylyp Illenko (born 30 September 1977) who is a film actor, producer and politician. During the 2012 Ukrainian parliamentary election Pylyp was No. 122 on the election list of "Svoboda" and Andriy was electable as a candidate for the same party in single mandate constituency No. 215; Andriy was elected into parliament and Pylyp was not.

== Awards and honors ==
Yefymenko was awarded the titles Merited Artist of Ukraine and People's Artist of Ukraine in 1998 and 2008 respectively. On 11 September 2021, she was awarded the Order of Princess Olga, 3rd class.
