= Mykhailo Maksymovych =

Russian historian and writer

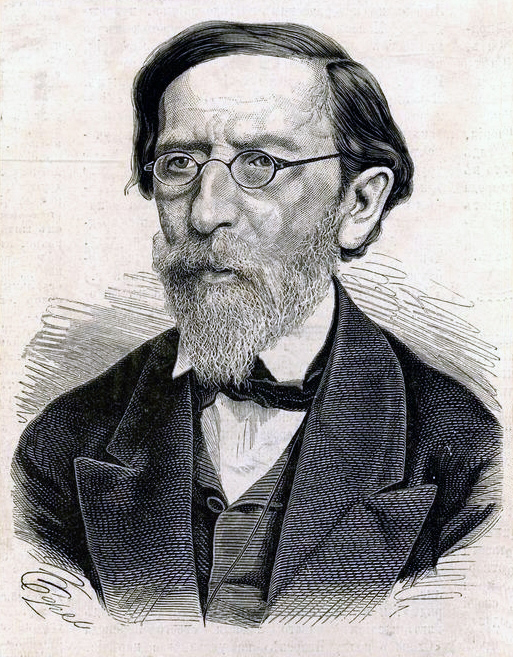
1873 portrait by Pyotr Borel

Mykhailo Oleksandrovych Maksymovych or Mikhail Aleksandrovich Maksimovich (Note: Ukrainian: Михайло Олександрович Максимович; Russian: Михаил Александрович Максимович) (3 September 1804 – 10 November 1873) was a Ukrainian botanist, historian and writer of Zaporozhian Cossack origin.

He contributed to the life sciences, especially botany and zoology, and to linguistics, folklore, ethnography, history, literary studies, and archaeology. In 1845, the Kyiv Archeographic Commission was founded at his initiative.

In 1871, he was elected as a corresponding member of the Russian Academy of Sciences, Russian language and literature department. Maksymovych also was a member of the Nestor the Chronicler Historical Association that existed in Kyiv in 1872–1931.

== Life ==
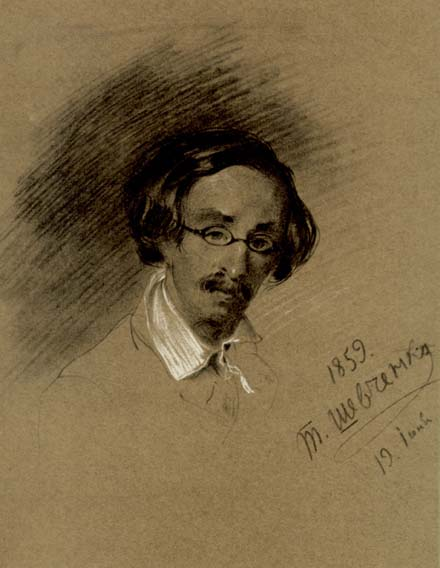
1859 portrait by Taras Shevchenko

Maksymovych was born into an old Zaporozhian Cossack family which owned a small estate on Mykhailova Hora near Prokhorivka, Zolotonosha county in Poltava Governorate (now in Cherkasy Oblast) in Left-bank Ukraine. After receiving his high school education at Novhorod-Siverskyi Gymnasium, he studied natural science and philology at philosophy faculty of the Imperial Moscow University and later the medical faculty, graduating with his first degree in 1823, his second in 1827; thereafter, he remained at the university in Moscow for further academic work in botany. In 1833 he received his doctorate and was appointed as a professor for the chair of botany in the Moscow University.

He taught biology and was director of the botanical garden at the university. During this period, he published extensively on botany and also on folklore and literature, and got to know many of the leading lights of Russian intellectual life, including the Russian poet Alexander Pushkin and the Russian writer of Ukrainian origin Nikolai Gogol, and shared his growing interest in Cossack history with them.

In 1834, he was appointed professor of Russian literature at the newly created Saint Vladimir University in Kiev and also became the university's first rector, a post that he held until 1835. (This university had been established by the Russian government to reduce Polish influence in Ukraine and Maksymovych was, in part, an instrument of this policy.) Maksymovych elaborated wide-ranging plans for the expansion of the university which eventually included attracting eminent Ukrainians and Russians like, Mykola Kostomarov, and Taras Shevchenko to teach there.

In 1847, he was deeply affected by the arrest, imprisonment, and exile of the members of the Pan-Slavic Brotherhood of Saints Cyril and Methodius, many of whom, like the poet Taras Shevchenko, were his friends or students. Thereafter, he buried himself in scholarship, publishing extensively.

In 1853, he married, and in 1857, in hope of relieving his severe financial situation, went to Moscow to find work. In 1858, Taras Shevchenko, having returned from exile, visited him in Moscow; Shevchenko visited Maksymovych once again after the latter returned to Mykhailova Hora. At this time, Shevchenko painted portraits of both Maksymovych and his wife, Maria.

During his final years, Maksymovych devoted himself more and more to history and engaged in extensive debates with the Russian historians Mikhail Pogodin and Mykola Kostomarov.

== The physical sciences and philosophy ==
In the 1820s and 1830s, Maksymovych published several textbooks on biology and botany. His first scholarly book on botany was published in 1823 under the title On the System of the Flowering Kingdom. He also published popular works on botany for the layman. This "populist" approach to science, he carried over into his writings on folklore, literature, and history.

In 1833 in Moscow, he published The Book of Naum About God's Great World, which was a popularly written exposition of geology, the Solar System, and the universe, in religious garb for the common folk. This book proved to be a best-seller and went through eleven editions, providing Maksymovych with some royalties for many long years.

Also in 1833, Maksymovych published "A Letter on Philosophy" which reflected his admiration for Schelling's "Nature-Philosophy." In this letter, he declared that true philosophy was based on love and that all branches of organized, systematic knowledge, which strove to recognize the internal meaning and unity of things, but most especially history, were philosophy. With his emphasis upon history, Maksymovych approached the views of Baader and Hegel as well as Schelling.

== Folklore ==
In 1827, Maksymovych published Little Russian Folksongs which was one of the first collections of folk songs published in eastern Europe. It contained 127 songs, including historical songs, songs about every-day life, and ritual songs. The collection marked a new turning to the common people, the folk, which was the hallmark of the new romantic era which was then beginning. Everywhere that it was read, it aroused the interest of the literate classes in the life of the common folk. In 1834 and in 1849, Maksymovych published two further collections.

In his collections of folksongs, Maksymovych used a new orthography for the Ukrainian language which was based on etymology. Although this Maksymovychivka looked quite similar to Russian, it was a first step towards an independent orthography, based on phonetics which was eventually proposed by Maksymovych's younger contemporary, Panteleimon Kulish. The latter forms the basis of the modern written Ukrainian language.

In general, Maksymovych claimed to see some basic psychological differences, reflecting differences in national character, between Ukrainian and Russian folk songs; he thought the former more spontaneous and lively, the latter more submissive. Such opinions were shared by many of his contemporaries such as his younger contemporary, the historian Mykola Kostomarov and others.

In 1856, Maksymovych published the first part of his "Days and Months of the Ukrainian Villager" which summed up many years of observation of the Ukrainian peasantry. In it, he laid out the folk customs of the Ukrainian village according to the calendar year. (The full work was only published in Soviet times.)

== Language and literature ==
In 1839, Maksymovych published his History of Old Russian Literature which dealt with the so-called Kieva period of Russian literature. Maksymovych saw a definite continuity between the language and literature of Ruthenia (Kievan Rus') and that of Cossack period. Indeed, he seems to have thought that the Old Ruthenian language stood in relation to modern Russian in a way similar to that of Old Czech to modern Polish or modern Slovak; that is, that one influenced but was not the same as the other. Later on, he also translated the epic Tale of Igor's Campaign into both modern Russian and modern Ukrainian verse. Maksymovych's literary works included poetry and almanacs with much material devoted to Russia.

== History ==
From the 1850s to the 1870s, Maksymovych worked extensively in history, especially Russian and Ukrainian history. He was critical of the Normanist theory which traced Kievan Rus' to Scandinavian origins, preferring to stress its Slavic roots. But he opposed the Russian historian, Mikhail Pogodin, who believed that the Kievan Rus' originally had been populated by Great Russians from the north. Maksymovych argued that the Kievan lands were never completely de-populated, even after the Mongol invasions, and that they had always been inhabited by Ruthenians and their direct ancestors. As well, he was the first to claim the "Lithuanian period" for Russian history. Maksymovych also worked on the history of the city of Kiev, of the Cossack Hetmanate, of the uprising of Bohdan Khmelnytsky, the Khmelnytsky Uprising against Poland, and other subjects. In general, he sympathized with these various Cossack rebels, so much so, in fact, that his first work on the Haidamaks was banned by the Russian censor. Many of his most important works were critical studies and corrections of the publications of other historians, like Mikhail Pogodin and Mykola Kostomarov.

== Slavistics ==
With regard to Slavic studies, Maksymovych remarked upon the various theses of the Czech philologist, Josef Dobrovský and the Slovak scholar, Pavel Jozef Šafárik. Like them, he divided the Slavic family into two major groups, a western group and an eastern group. But then he sub-divided the western group into two further parts: a north-western group and a south-western group. (Dobrovsky had lumped the Russians together with the South Slavs.) Maksymovych particularly objected to Dobrovsky's contention that the major eastern or Russian group was unified, without major divisions or dialects. This eastern group, Maksymovych divided into two independent languages, South Russian and North Russian. The South Russian language, he divided into two major dialects, Ruthenian and Red Ruthenian/Galician. The North Russian language, he divided into four major dialects of which he thought the Muscovite the most developed, but also the youngest. In addition to this, he also seems to have considered Belarusian to be an independent language, intermediate between North and South Russian, but much closer to the former. Writing at the beginning of the twentieth century, the Croatian scholar Vatroslav Jagić thought Maksymovych's scheme to have been a solid contribution to Slavic philology.

Maksymovych also argued in favour of the independent origin of the spoken Old Rus languages, thinking them separate from the book language of the time which was based on Church Slavonic. Maksymovych also made some critical remarks on Pavel Jozef Šafárik's map of the Slavic world, wrote on the Lusatian Sorbs, and on Polish proverbs. Maksymovych, as well, wrote a brief autobiography which was first published in 1904. His correspondence was large and significant.

== Legacy ==
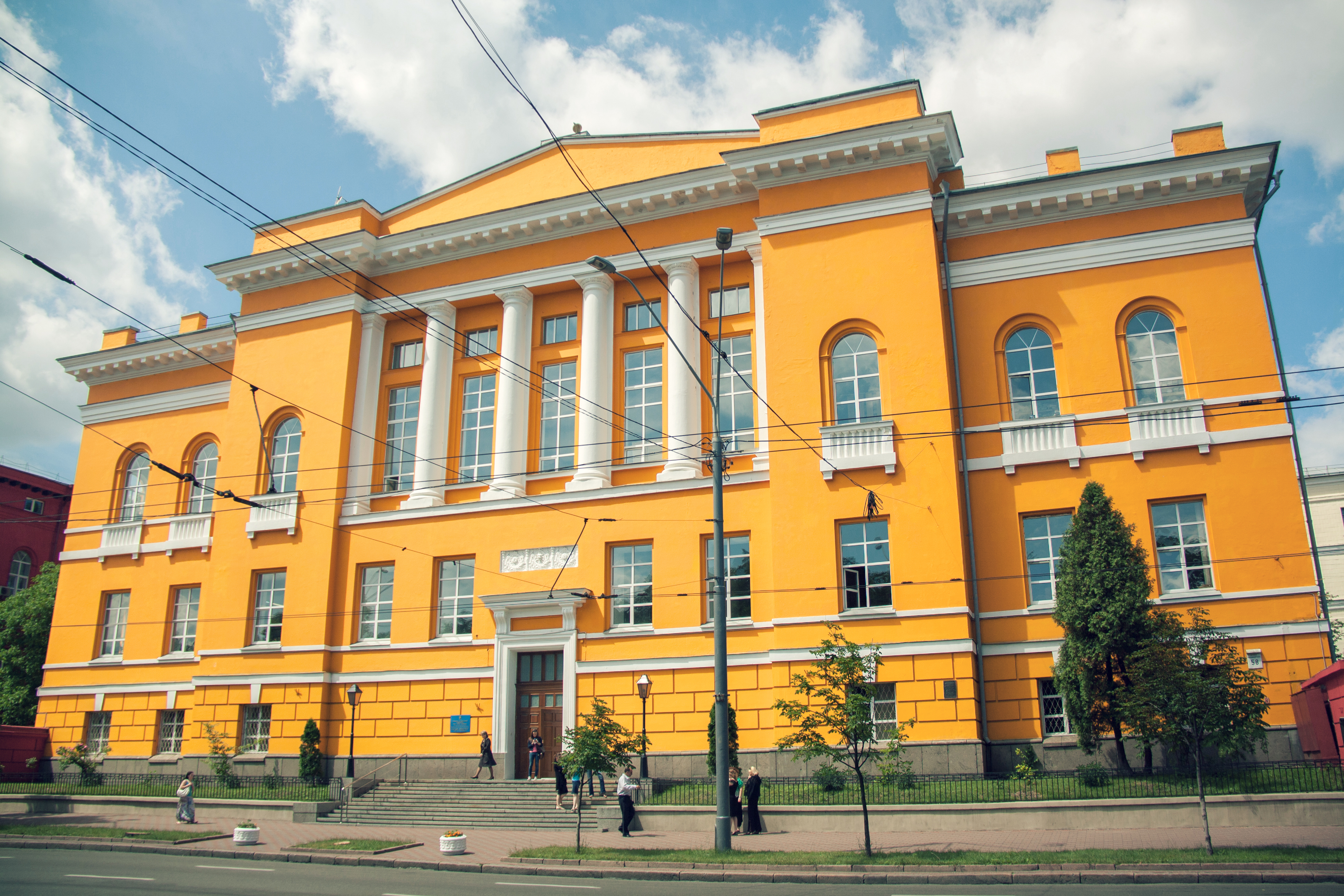
Maksymovych Scientific Library

Maksymovych was a pioneer of his time and, in many ways, one of the last of the "universal men" who were able to contribute original works to both the sciences and the humanities. His works in biology and the physical sciences reflected a concern for the common man – love for his fellow human being, Schelling's philosophy, at – and his works in literature, folklore, and history, often phrased in terms of friendly public "letters" to his scholarly opponents, pointed to new directions in telling the story of the common people. In doing this, however, Maksymovych "awakened" new national sentiments among his fellows, especially the younger generation. He greatly influenced many of his younger contemporaries including the poet Taras Shevchenko, the historian Mykola Kostomarov, the writer Panteleimon Kulish, and many others.

The library of Kyiv University is named in his honour.

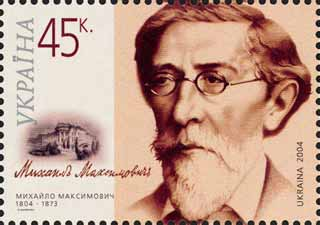
Postage stamp of Ukraine, dedicated to the 200th anniversary of Mykhailo Maksymovych's birth (2004)

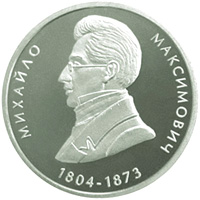
Commemorative coin of Ukraine

== Notes ==
Educational offices
| Preceded by position created | Rector of St.Vladimir Kyiv University; 1834–1835 | Succeeded by Volodymyr Tsykh |
