= Yuri Ilyenko =

Soviet-Ukrainian film director

- Юрій Іллєнко
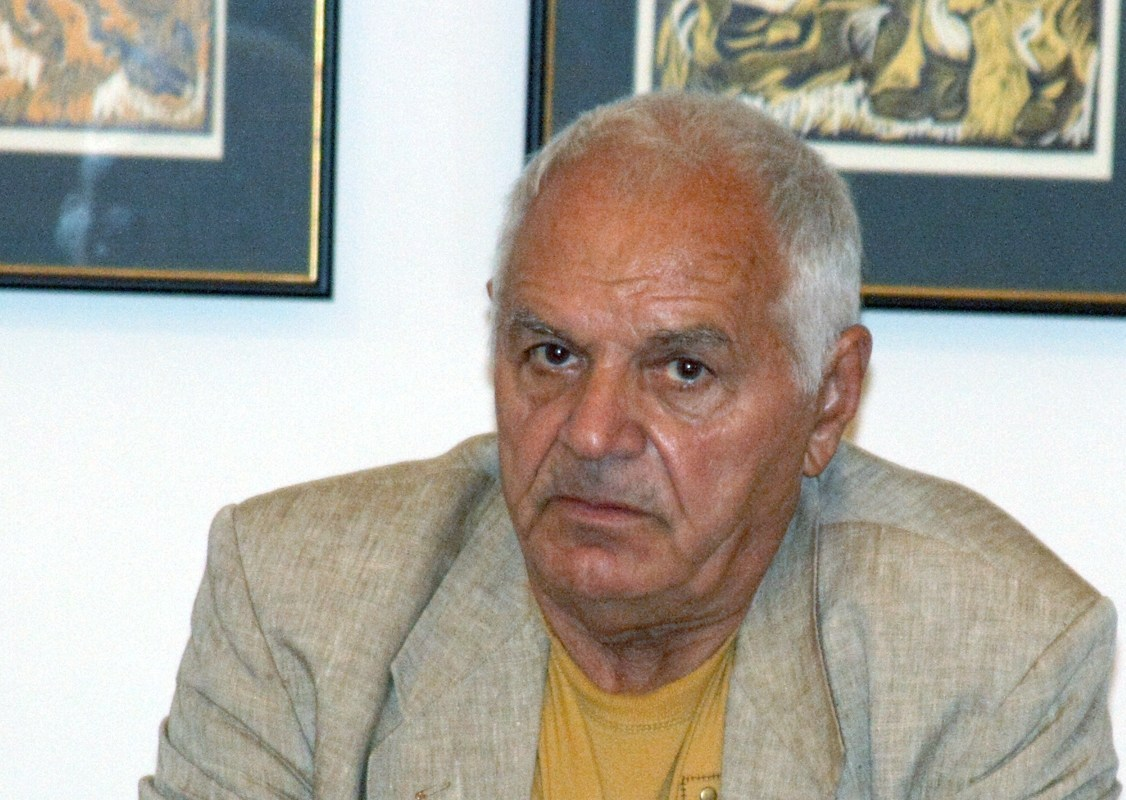
- Born: 18 July 1936; Cherkasy, Ukrainian SSR, Soviet Union (now Ukraine)
- Died: 15 June 2010 (aged 73); Prokhorivka, Ukraine
- Occupations: Film director, screenwriter, cinematographer, politician
- Years active: 1960–2002
- Children: Pylyp Illenko
- Awards: Shevchenko National Prize, 1991

Yuri Herasymovych Ilyenko (Ukrainian: Юрій Герасимович Іллєнко; 18 July 1936 – 15 June 2010) was a Ukrainian film director, screenwriter, cinematographer and politician. He directed twelve films between 1965 and 2002. His 1970 film The White Bird Marked with Black was entered into the 7th Moscow International Film Festival where it won the Golden Prize.

Ilyenko was one of Ukraine's most influential filmmakers. His films represented Ukraine and what was happening to it. His films were banned in the USSR for their suspected anti-Soviet symbolism. Only in the recent years have his films been re-released and open to the public.

== Biography ==
Ilyenko was born in Cherkasy in 1936 but during World War II his family was evacuated to Siberia while his father was in the Red Army. He graduated high school in Moscow and Gerasimov Institute of Cinematography in 1960. From 1960 till 1963 he worked as a director of photography at the Yalta Film Studio. In 1963 Ilyenko started his work as an operator and then a director at Dovzhenko Film Studios. His 1965 film A Spring for the Thirsty (written by Ivan Drach) and 1968 film Vechir Na Ivan Kupala were both banned by the Soviet authorities till 1988. His 1971 film The White Bird Marked with Black, received the grand prize of the Moscow International Film Festival, but at the 24th Congress of the Communist Party of Ukraine the film was (also) banned and branded "the most harmful movie that has ever been made in Ukraine, specifically for young people". His next film, To dream and to live (written in collaboration with Ivan Mykolaichuk), was stopped 42 times at various stages of production. Ilyenko then emigrated to Yugoslavia, where he shot the film To live in spite of everything. The film won "Silver" at Pula Film Festival and the prize for best actor. In the Ukrainian SSR, the picture was not allowed to be shown. His 1983 film Lisova pisnia. Mavka won the FIPRESCI Prize. In 1987 he received the title of People's Artist of the Ukrainian SSR. He created the independent film studio Fest-Zemlya, where he made the first non-state film in Ukraine. His 1990 film "Swan Lake "The Zone"" again won the FIPRESCI Prize. In 1991 and 1992 he was Chairman of the Ukrainian Cinema Foundation. in 1991 he was awarded the Shevchenko National Prize. His 1994 documentary about Sergei Parajanov received the "Golden Knight" at the film festival Cinema City. In 1996 he became a member of the Academy of Arts of Ukraine. His 2002 film A Prayer for Hetman Mazepa was banned from rental in Russia.

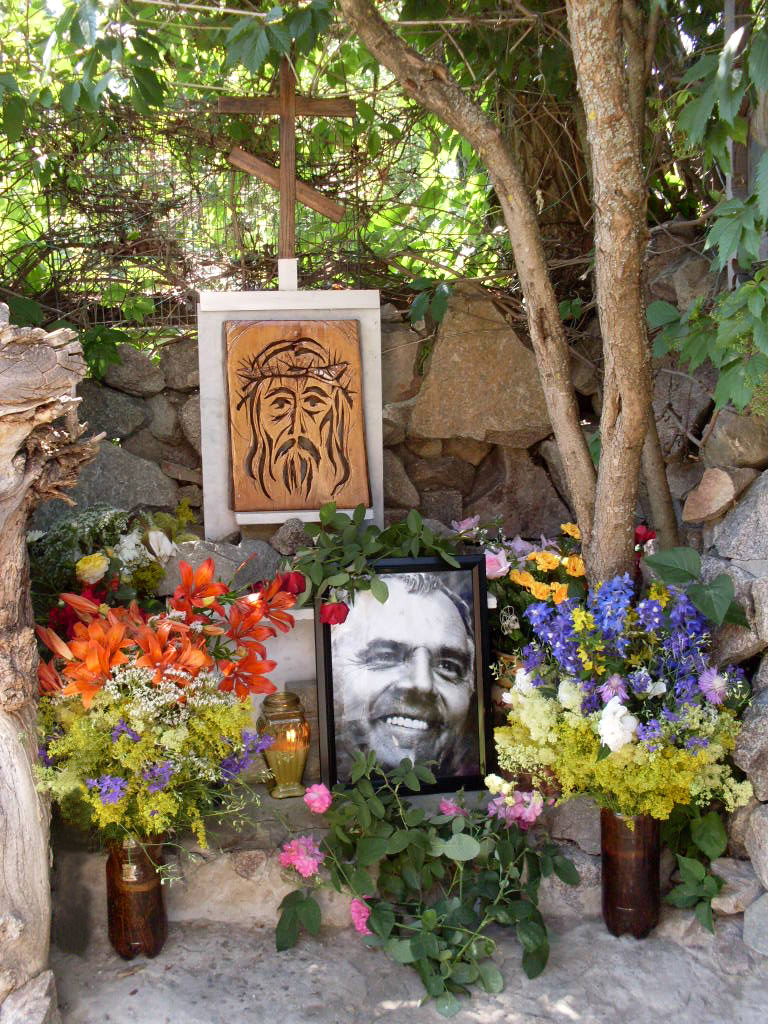
Yuri Ilyenko remembrance monument in Cherkasy

In the 2007 parliamentary elections he was placed second on the election list of All-Ukrainian Union "Svoboda", but at that election the party received 0.76% of the votes cast and did not make it to parliament.

He died of cancer on 15 June 2010 at the age of 74.

== Family ==
He was a member of the Communist Party since 1973, but changed his political position after the end of the USSR. Ilyenko was married to the fellow director Lyudmyla Yefymenko and had two sons, Andriy Ilyenko (born 1987) and (also film actor and producer) Pylyp Illenko (born 1977). During the 2012 Ukrainian parliamentary election Pylyp was № 122 on the election list of "Svoboda" and Andriy was electable as a candidate for the same party in single mandate constituency № 215; Andriy was elected into parliament and Pylyp was not.

== Selected filmography ==
- Shadows of Forgotten Ancestors, cinematographer (1965)
- A Spring for the Thirsty, director (1965)
- The Eve of Ivan Kupala, director (1968)
- The White Bird Marked with Black, director (1970)
- Swan Lake "The Zone", director (1990)
- A Prayer for Hetman Mazepa, director, actor (2002)
