= Zaza Nanuashvili =

Ukrainian and Georgian military officer (born 1974)

Zaza Nanuashvili ზაზა ნანუაშვილი
- Born: 31 August 1974; Georgian SSR
- Military career
- Allegiance: Ministry of Internal Affairs of Georgia, Defence Forces of Ukraine
- Service years: 2008–
- Units: National Guard of Ukraine (2014–2022), Solidarity special unit of Main Directorate of Intelligence (2022–2025)
- Conflicts: Russo-Georgian War; Russo-Ukrainian War; War in Donbas; Russian invasion of Ukraine

Zaza Nanuashvili (Georgian: ზაზა ნანუაშვილი; born 31 August 1974) is a Ukrainian military officer of Georgian origin. Since 2022, he has commanded the Solidarity special operations unit of the Main Directorate of Intelligence of Ukraine.

== Biography ==
=== Early life and military service in Georgia ===
Nanuashvili was born in Georgia. His family has ancestral ties to the village of Mzisguli in Kakheti.

From 1991 to 1996, he studied law at Tbilisi State University.

Between 1998 and 2011, he served in the Ministry of Internal Affairs of Georgia. He was an officer in the ministry's special forces. In August 2008, he participated as a volunteer in the Russo-Georgian War.

=== Military service in Ukraine ===
In 2014, Nanuashvili travelled to Ukraine and joined one of the Ukrainian volunteer battalions under the command of the National Guard of Ukraine.

He participated in fighting in and around Shyrokyne, Marinka, Shchastia, Horlivka, Bakhmut, Sloviansk, Soledar, Avdiivka, Zolote, and Popasna.

According to Nanuashvili, his decision to fight for Ukraine was motivated by gratitude towards Ukrainians who had helped evacuate Georgian civilians during the War in Abkhazia (1992–1993), as well as by his belief that defeating Russia in Ukraine would help Georgia regain its occupied territories. He described the experiences of Ukrainians and Georgians as a shared struggle.

On 8 March 2016, he became a senior instructor in the National Guard of Ukraine.

Following the beginning of the Russian invasion of Ukraine in 2022, Nanuashvili established and took command of Solidarity, a reconnaissance and sabotage unit comprising Georgian and other foreign volunteers. The unit operated under the Main Directorate of Intelligence of Ukraine. In 2024, Solidarity, which subsequently developed into an international legion, became a separate special operations unit within DIU.

As its commander, Nanuashvili led combat operations in Donetsk Oblast and Zaporizhzhia Oblast.

According to Ukrainian media reports, Nanuashvili acquired Ukrainian citizenship in 2024 in recognition of his contribution to the defence of Ukraine's sovereignty and territorial integrity.

=== Sentencing in absentia by Russian authorities ===
On 6 November 2026, the Russian-controlled Supreme Court of the self-proclaimed Donetsk People's Republic sentenced Nanuashvili in absentia to 17 years in a strict-regime penal colony. Russian authorities accused him of training a mercenary and participating in an armed conflict as a mercenary. They also announced that he had been placed on an international wanted list.

The Russian Prosecutor General's Office described Nanuashvili as a Georgian citizen, although Ukrainian media reported that he had acquired Ukrainian citizenship in 2024.

According to Ukrainian media, legal assistance was being provided to prevent his inclusion in international wanted-person databases.

== Personal life ==
Nanuashvili is married to Olena, a Ukrainian woman who has been involved in volunteer activities in Belgium since 2022. They have a young son. In May 2023, Nanuashvili spoke about how his marriage and family had strengthened his connection to Ukraine:

"I used to say that I was fighting for Georgia, but then my little son was born, and I started a family with a Ukrainian woman. I came to love Ukraine as my own country. And now I can say wholeheartedly that I am fighting for Ukraine as well. For Georgia and for Ukraine."

His son from his first marriage, Vano Nanuashvili, is a member of the Solidarity special operations unit. In 2014, Vano travelled to Ukraine without his father's knowledge to join a volunteer battalion.

== Awards and decorations ==
Nanuashvili has received several military decorations from the Main Directorate of Intelligence of Ukraine.

He has also received the following decorations from the Orthodox Church of Ukraine:

- Order of the Holy Great Martyr George the Victorious (30 August 2023)
- Order of the Holy Equal-to-the-Apostles Prince Volodymyr, 2nd Class (1 September 2026)
- Order of the Holy Equal-to-the-Apostles Prince Volodymyr, 3rd Class (19 September 2024)

== In popular culture ==
Nanuashvili was the central subject of the 2023 documentary film Bound by Blood (Ukrainian: Скріплені кров'ю), directed by Ukrainian journalist Oleh Manchura. The film premiered on 9 May 2023 and explores the involvement of Georgian volunteers in the Russo-Ukrainian War.

Filming took place in Georgia, Belgium, and on the front line in Zaporizhzhia Oblast. Nanuashvili attended the film's presentation in Kyiv.
