= Pylyp Illenko =

Ukrainian actor and politician (born 1977)

- Пилип Іллєнко
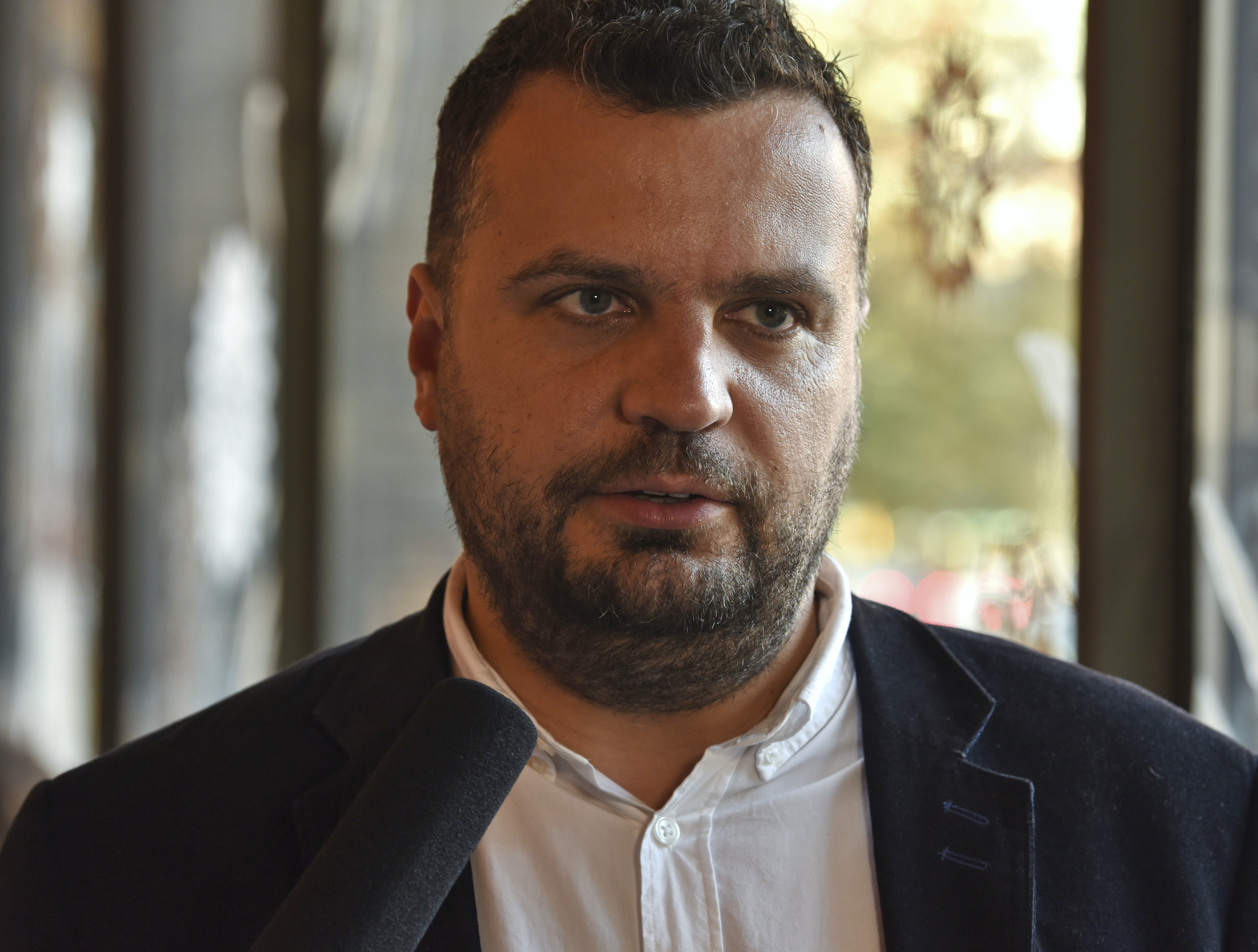
- Illenko in 2017

Head of Ukrainian State Film Agency
- In office August 2014 – August 2019
- Preceded by: Kateryna Kopylova
- Succeeded by: Yulia Shevchuk (acting)

Personal details
- Born: 30 September 1977 (age 48) Kyiv, Ukrainian SSR, Soviet Union
- Party: Svoboda
- Parents: Yuri Ilyenko (father); Lyudmyla Yefymenko (mother)
- Education: Taras Shevchenko National University of Kyiv
- Occupation: Actor; politician

Pylyp Yuriyovych Illenko (Ukrainian: Пилип Юрійович Іллєнко; born 30 September 1977) is a Ukrainian actor, politician and producer who served as the head of the Ukrainian State Film Agency from 2014 to 2019.

== Early life and education ==
Illenko was born in Kyiv on 30 September 1977. He comes from a prominent film and acting family—his father is director Yuri Ilyenko and his mother is actress Lyudmyla Yefymenko. His brother, Andriy Illenko, is a politician who served as a People's Deputy of Ukraine during the 7th and 8th convocations. In 1999, he graduated from the Taras Shevchenko National University of Kyiv's Institute of International Relations with a master's degree in international law, is an English translator, and has a bachelor's degree in international relations. The topic of the thesis is "International legal instruments for the protection of related rights".

== Career ==
=== Early career ===
Illienko began his professional career in 1999 at the Department of International Law within Ukraine's Ministry of Justice, where he worked until 2000. From August 2000 to November 2002, he served as a senior scientific consultant, and later as chief scientific consultant, in the Department of Humanitarian and International Issues, Legislative Harmonisation with EU Countries, and Human Rights Protection within Ukraine's Main Scientific and Expert Department.

Between November 2002 and September 2004, he worked as a legal adviser—and subsequently as the main legal adviser—in the legal support department of the Directorate of Legal Support and Contractual Work at the Ukrainian-American-Dutch-German Closed Joint Stock Company "Utel". From September 2004 to July 2005, he continued his legal career as a senior legal counsel in the legal department of "Utel", a subsidiary enterprise of Ukrtelecom.

From March 2006 to March 2008, Illenko served as the director and co-owner of LLC "Law Company Ilenko and Syzov." From 2007 until 2014, he was both a co-producer and producer for the Open Night Film Festival. Between April 2008 and July 2014, he directed and co-owned Illenko Film LLC. In 2010, Illenko was elected as a deputy to the city council of Ukrainka in the Kyiv Oblast. Additionally, in the 2012 Ukrainian Verkhovna Rada elections, he ran as a candidate on the All-Ukrainian Union's "Svoboda" list (№122).

=== Head of Ukrainian State Film Agency ===
On 6 August 2014, during a period of national crisis, Illenko was appointed head of the Ukrainian State Film Agency. Despite the country's limited resources due to its focus on defence, he successfully spearheaded the revival of the Ukrainian film industry over the next five years. His leadership is widely credited with the "rebirth" of Ukrainian cinema during this critical time for the nation.

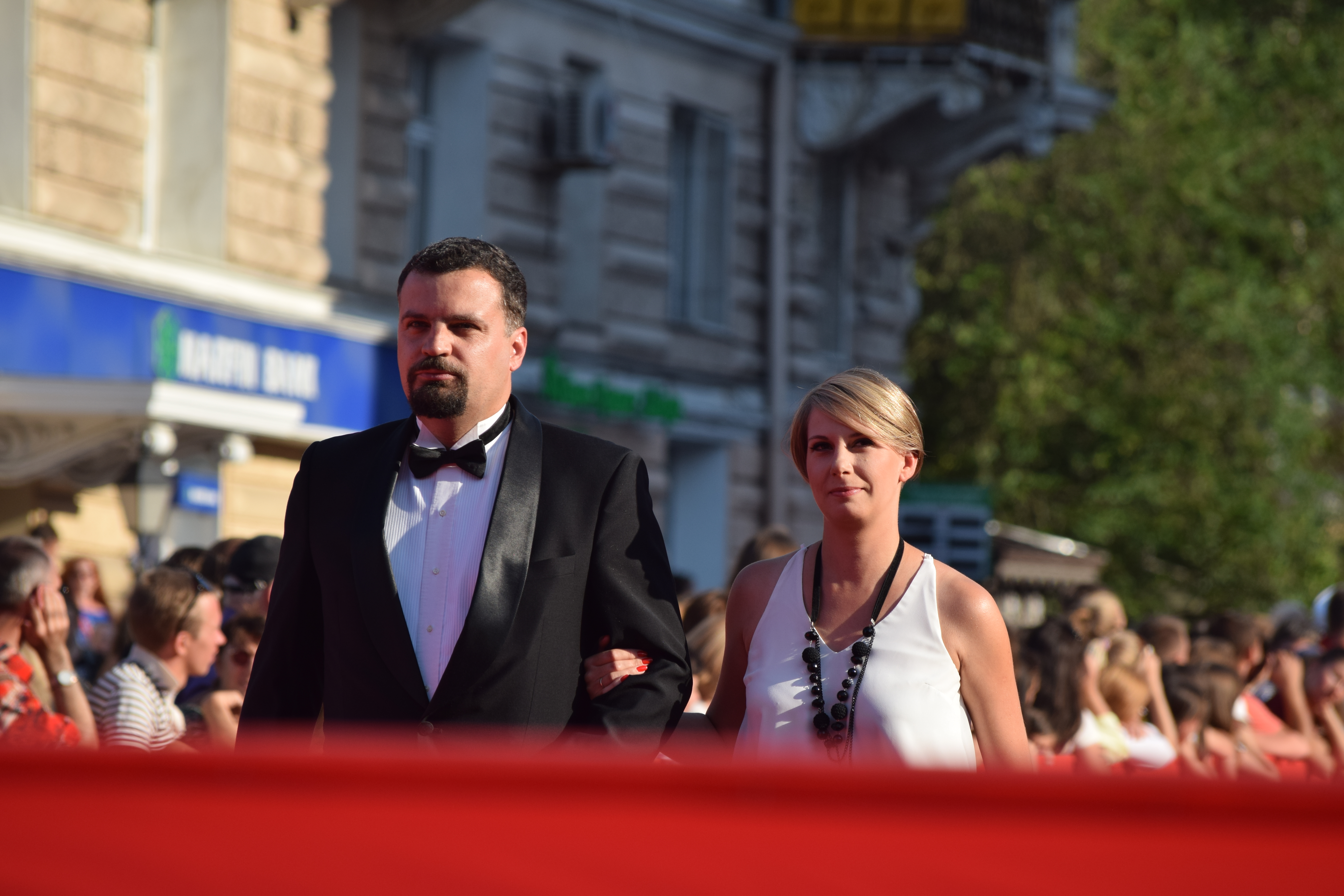
Illenko (left) in 2016

In 2016, Volodymyr Zelenskyy sparked public outcry when a recording surfaced of him making a joke about Ukraine during a performance in Jurmala, where he compared the country to an actress in "German films". Although the incident occurred during his company's participation in a Ukrainian State Film Agency funding competition, the agency was not involved and declined to comment. Despite the controversy, Zelenskyy's projects received high praise, though he chose to withdraw them voluntarily. Illenko commented that he had no personal dispute with Zelenskyy and praised him for his respectful behaviour.

Illenko on the cover of Culture and Life

In November 2017, Illenko announced the withdrawal of state registration and rental certificates for all seasons of the Russian television series Svaty. This decision followed the Security Service of Ukraine's imposition of a three-year entry ban on the series' star, actor Fyodor Dobronravov, due to his outspoken support for Russia's annexation of Crimea and his repeated visits to the region in violation of Ukrainian law. Subsequently, the Ministry of Culture included Dobronravov on the list of individuals deemed a threat to national security, prompting the agency to ban the series in accordance with Ukrainian law.

In January 2018, the National Agency on Corruption Prevention (NACP) charged Illenko with an administrative offence, alleging that he had fraudulently approved a bonus payment of ₴60,000 to his cousin, a department head within the Ukrainian State Film Agency. Illenko denied the allegations, calling them unfounded and asserting his innocence. In May 2018, the Pechersk court in Kyiv dismissed all corruption charges due to the lack of evidence, prompting Illenko to demand a public apology from the NACP.

In February 2018, Oleksandr Tkachenko criticised the Ukrainian State Film Agency, led by Illenko, for failing to take action against Russian performers who violated Ukraine's territorial integrity by including them on official blacklists. He accused Illenko and other regulatory authorities of being inconsistent and ineffective in enforcing bans on pro-Russian figures in the media.

=== Resignation ===
On 19 August 2019, Illenko announced his resignation in a video message, stating that he did not want his position to become a source of political drama. He submitted his resignation to Prime Minister Oleksiy Honcharuk, allowing the new government to conduct an open competition for his replacement. Illenko expressed that his mission was complete, noting that under his leadership, Ukraine's film industry had achieved its best performance since independence. He also mentioned his intention to continue working in cinema. Directors, actors such as Rymma Zyubina, and audiences widely praised Illenko for introducing transparent pitchings, sustaining the industry, boosting the presence of Ukrainian-language films, attracting international interest, promoting integration with global cinema, and reigniting pride and unity within the Ukrainian film community.

On 12 November 2020, Illenko was elected chairman of the board of the Ukrainian Film Academy during its first meeting in a new composition, held online. Illenko, also a film producer, expressed gratitude to his colleagues for their trust and emphasised the shared mission of promoting Ukrainian cinema both domestically and internationally. His term, along with that of other board members, is set for two years.

== Filmography ==
In addition to his acting career, the film actor has played more than ten roles, appearing in films such as Forest Song. Mavka, The Legend of Princess Olga, Straw Bells, Swan Lake. Zone, Ave, Maria, A Small Journey to a Large Carousel, Prayer for Hetman Mazepa, and Hoverla. He also produced the feature films Prayer for Hetman Mazepa. New Version (directed by Y. Illienko, 2010) and Toloka (directed by M. Illienko, 2019), a short film Ideal Friend (directed by S. Alioshechkin, 2025).

== Political positions ==
=== Diversifying Ukrainian cinema ===
Illenko argued for a comprehensive and strategic approach to promoting Ukrainian cinema in 2016. He emphasised that film-production money alone is insufficient and advocated for further investment in promotion, cinema networks, film education, and the preservation of Ukraine's cinematic legacy. Illenko advocated legislation to recruit international producers and promote Ukraine as a filmmaking location, claiming that the domestic market is insufficient to sustain film production without government assistance.

He advocated for genre variety, particularly underrepresented genres such as black comedy, and promoted mainstream and co-productions with overseas partners. While acknowledging the particular appeal of art house films, he stressed the importance of explicit genre targeting to match audience expectations and increase market success. Illenko also pushed for more exposure of Ukrainian cinema in the media and on television, but acknowledged that art-house programming is more suited to cinemas or internet platforms than mainstream television.

=== Support for Oleh Sentsov ===
Ukrainian filmmakers, including Illenko, supported imprisoned director Oleh Sentsov by reading his stories as part of the "Vloud" campaign, aimed at raising awareness of his hunger strike for the release of Ukrainian political prisoners in Russia. Despite international appeals, including from the Council of Europe, the Kremlin rejected calls for his pardon.

== Personal life ==
Illenko is married to Eugenia, and they have two sons: Georgy, born in 2008, and Svyatoslav, born in 2010.

According to his 2017 declaration, Illenko does not own any real estate personally but shares ownership of an apartment in Kyiv with his brother and mother. His mother also owns two plots of land in Kyiv and the Chernihiv Oblast, as well as a country house in the capital. Two Mazda cars are registered in her name, while Illenko himself drives a GAZ 2705 and a Honda motorcycle. His wife owns a Toyota RAV4. That year, Illenko earned ₴161,000, had no bank accounts, and declared ₴15,000 in cash.
