= Taras Tomenko =

Ukrainian filmmaker (born 1976)

- Тарас Томенко
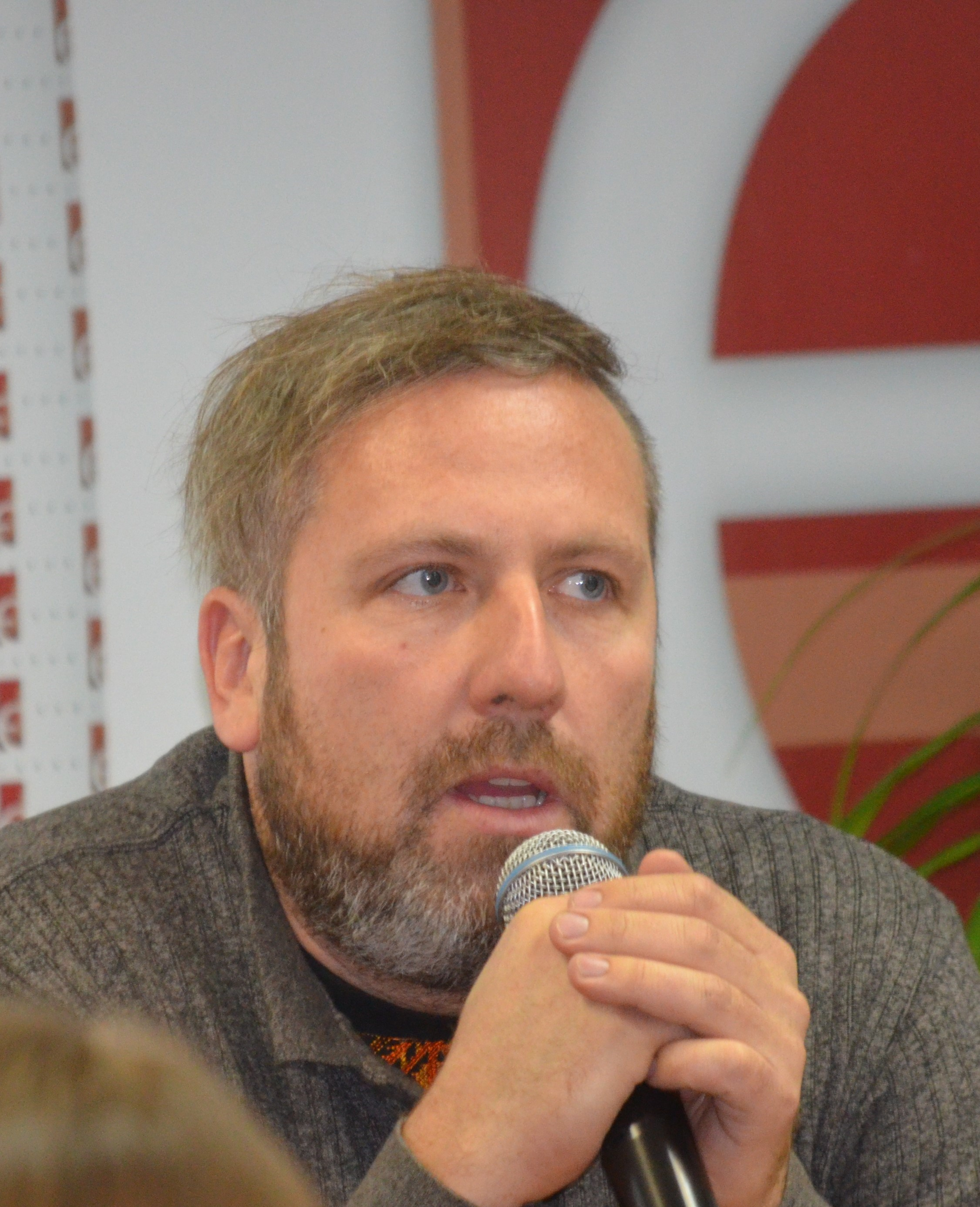
- Taras Tomenko in 2015
- Born: 6 February 1976 (age 50); Kyiv, Ukraine
- Education: Taras Shevchenko National University of Kyiv, Kyiv National I. K. Karpenko-Kary Theatre, Cinema and Television University
- Occupation: Film director

Taras Mykolaiovych Tomenko (Ukrainian: Тарас Миколайович Томенко; born 6 February 1976) is a Ukrainian film director and screenwriter. Member of the Ukrainian Film Academy and the European Film Academy (since 2018). Recipient of the Ukrainian National Film Award Golden Dzyga for Best Director and Best Screenplay (2025).

== Biography ==
Taras Tomenko was born in Kyiv into the family of Ukrainian poet Mykola Tomenko. He studied at the Faculty of Philology of Taras Shevchenko National University of Kyiv and at the Kyiv National I. K. Karpenko-Kary Theatre, Cinema and Television University.

He completed internships and participated in international initiatives, including masterclasses by Krzysztof Zanussi (2011, Warsaw, Poland), the Nipkow Programm (2002, Berlin, Germany), Berlinale Talent Campus (2004 and 2005, Berlin, Germany).

In 2001, his student film Shooting Gallery received awards at the Venice International Film Festival (ARTE France Award) and at the 51st Berlin International Film Festival (Grand Prix for Best Short Film in the Panorama programme).

His film Parched Land (2004) received awards at the Thessaloniki International Film Festival (Best Short Film), the Sapporo International Short Film Festival in Japan (Best Silent Film), and a special prize from the Federation of European Screen Directors (FERA).

His documentary Slovo House (2018) won the Ukrainian National Film Award Golden Dzyga for Best Documentary Film. His feature film Slovo House: Unfinished Novel (2021) received the Best Feature Film award at the Košice International Film Festival (Slovakia), as well as several awards at the I Will Tell International Film Festival (Florida, United States). In 2025, Taras Tomenko received the Golden Dzyga awards for Best Director and Best Screenplay for the film Slovo House: Unfinished Novel. The film also won the award for Best Film.

His documentary film Boney Piles (Terykony) (2022) about the lives of children in the frontline areas of Donbas, had its world premiere at the Berlin International Film Festival (Generation programme) and was awarded Best Ukrainian Documentary Film at the Odesa International Film Festival, Best Documentary Film at goEast Festival of Central and Eastern European Film (Germany), and the FIPRESCI Prize from the International Federation of Film Critics.

In May 2025, Tomenko's documentary film A Sentimental Journey to the Planet of Parajanov was released in wide distribution in Ukraine, marking the 100th anniversary of film director Sergei Parajanov.

In September 2025, in an interview with Berliner Zeitung, Tomenko stated that he was working on a documentary film about Kakha Tilidze, a Georgian volunteer who fought on the side of Ukraine in the Russo-Ukrainian War and was killed in action in January 2025. The film was in the editing stage. He also announced the beginning of work on the feature film The Tale of Igor’s Campaign, the first screen adaptation of the 12th-century East Slavic epic of the same name. The screenplay is being written by Taras Tomenko and Kostiantyn Konovalov.

== Selected filmography ==
Year	English title	Original title	Notes
1998	The Slaughterhouse	Бійня	Short
2001	Shooting Gallery	Тир	Short
2004	Parched Land	Пересохла земля	Short
2006	Liza	Ліза	Short
2018	Slovo House	Будинок "Слово"	Documentary
2021	Slovo House: Unfinished Novel	Будинок "Слово": Нескінчений роман	Feature film
2022	Boney Piles	Терикони	Documentary
2024	A Sentimental Journey to the Parajanov Planet	Сентиментальна подорож до планети Параджанова	Documentary
2026	The Bloom of Marigolds. The Story of Kakha Tilidze	Цвіт чорнобривців. Історія Кахи Тілідзе	Documentary (In progress)
2027	The Tale of Igor's Campaign	Слово о полку Ігоря	Feature film (In progress)
