= Ukrainian State Film Agency =

Government body

Ukrainian State Film Agency (Державне агентство України з питань кіно)

Agency overview
- Formed: 28 March 2011
- Website: usfa.gov.ua

The Ukrainian State Film Agency (Ukrainian: Державне агентство України з питань кіно, romanized: Derzhavne ahentstvo Ukrayiny z pytan kino, lit. 'State Agency of Ukraine for Film Issues'), known in short as Derzhkino (Ukrainian: Держкіно), is the central executive body of cinematography in Ukraine. It was created in 2011. Pylyp Illenko was the agency's chair from August 2014 until his resignation in August 2019.

== Establishment ==
On 28 March 2011, as a result, the State Service of Cinematography was eliminated, instead, the State Agency of Ukraine on Cinema as a central executive body, which implements state policy in the field of cinematography, was established. From August 2014 to August 2019, the Chairman of the Agency was Pylyp Illenko.

Since the creation of the State Committee, the financing of film production by the state has been significantly increased. Thus, in 2010, the financing of Ukrainian cinema amounted to ₴24 million, and by 2011, it had ballooned to ₴111 million. In 2012, state financing of the film industry amounted to ₴176 million.

In 2011, the First Pitching under the new rules, when the State Financing was distributed after the presentation of projects before experts and according to their estimates. Initially, the State Film Agency financed 10 short tapes, and subsequently began to increase the pace and spend on Pithchigi every year. Financing for a new scheme also received young cinematographers, and names.

== Ratings ==
Ratings issued by the State Film Agency as of the latest amendment in 2015:

- ДА (Children Audience, Ukrainian: Дитяча Авдиторія, romanized: Dyticha Avdytoriia): Film aimed for children. They contain no violence or obscenity.
- ЗА (General Audience, Ukrainian: Загальна Авдиторія, romanized: Zahalna Avdytoriia): Suitable for all audiences.
- 12: Suitable for children aged 12 and older; those under 12 may be admitted if accompanied by an adult as parents may find upsetting to them.
- 16: Not allowed for viewing by persons under 16 years of age.
- 18: Not allowed for viewing by persons under 18 years of age. Additionally, "18" rated features may only be screened in theaters after 18:00, and they may be broadcast on television only after 22:00.
- Відмовлено (Denied, Refused): Refused a classification by the Derzhkino. Content may not be shown, advertised, or distributed anywhere in Ukraine.
  - Films can get rejected if they promote war, violence, cruelty, and fascism aimed at eliminating Ukraine's independence.

=== Formerly used ===
- 14: Suitable for children aged 14 and older; those under 14 may be admitted if accompanied by an adult.
- X21: Not allowed for viewing by persons under 21 years of age. Used to indicate pornography.

== Criticism ==
The State Film Agency prioritizes funding for so-called patriotic projects. To qualify, the State Film Agency requires that the Ukrainian or Crimean Tatar languages account for 90% of a film's total dialogue, in order to counteract the dominance of Russia's state-sponsored patriotic film industry. An article at Radio Free Europe/Radio Liberty reported that "Some have likened the Derzhkino criteria to the sort of censorship that exists in authoritarian countries like Russia".
