= Konstantin Bryliakov =

Russian researcher (born 1977)

Konstantin P. Bryliakov
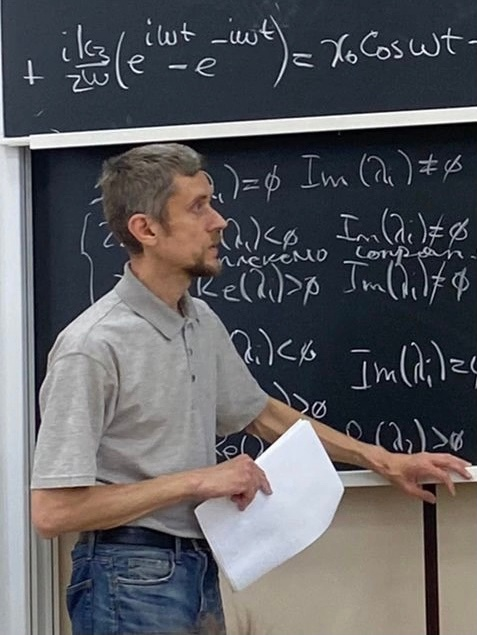
- Born: 1 June 1977 (age 49); Yoshkar-Ola, Mari El, Soviet Union
- Education: Novosibirsk State University
- Scientific career
- Fields: Physical chemistry; homogeneous catalysis
- Workplaces: N. D. Zelinsky Institute of Organic Chemistry; Novosibirsk State University

Konstantin P. Bryliakov (born 1 June 1977; Russian: Константи́н Петро́вич Брыляко́в) is a Russian chemist and author of monographs and over 190 research papers, textbooks, and patents. He is a professor at Russian Academy of Sciences and Novosibirsk State University. He is the head of the Laboratory of Selective Oxidation Catalysis at N. D. Zelinsky Institute of Organic Chemistry of the Russian Academy of Sciences.

== Biography ==
Bryliakov was born in Yoshkar-Ola, USSR. He studied chemistry at Novosibirsk State University from 1994 to 1999, after which he joined the Boreskov Institute of Catalysis as a PhD student and Novosibirsk State University as a teaching assistant. He was elected Professor of Novosibirsk State University in 2018.

=== Academic career ===
Bryliakov received a Cand. Chem. Sci. (PhD) degree in chemical physics from the Voevodsky Institute of Chemical Kinetics and Combustion, Novosibirsk, in 2001, and a Doctor of Chemical Sciences degree (Habilitation) in catalysis from the Boreskov Institute of Catalysis, Novosibirsk, in 2008. Until 2023 he was a head of Department of Mechanisms of Catalytic Reactions at the Boreskov Institute of Catalysis, after which time he joined N. D. Zelinsky Institute of Organic Chemistry. In 2016, Konstantin Bryliakov was elected professor of the Russian Academy of Sciences.

Bryliakov served as an invited editor of catalysis journals Topics in Catalysis and Catalysis Today. He was also a member of scientific committees of international catalysis conferences. He has been member of the Advisory Board of Referees of ARKIVOC since 2004 and International Advisory Board member of ChemCatChem (until rotation in December 2024).

=== Research ===
Bryliakov's research interests include green enantioselective (stereoselective) synthesis (mainly oxidation), biomimetic chemistry, coordination polymerization of olefins, including mechanisms of these reactions. Konstantin Bryliakov pioneered the use of homochiral metal-organic frameworks as chiral stationary phases for chromatographic separation of enantiomers. He discovered a new dynamic non-linear effect in asymmetric catalysis, named asymmetric autoamplification, and proposed the novel, non-autocatalytic chemical model of perbiotic chirality amplification. Konstantin Bryliakov developed a variety of biomimetic approaches to molecular editing of complex organic molecules via direct selective activation and heterofunctionalization of aliphatic C-H groups.

=== International activities ===
Bryliakov has worked at the University of Konstanz, University of East Anglia, Reims University, University of Castilla-La Mancha, Institute of Chemistry of the Chinese Academy of Sciences, and managed several international research projects supported by RFBR. Winner of the President of Chinese Academy of Sciences International Fellowship Award for 2020.

== Publications ==
- Bryliakov, Konstantin (2014). Environmentally Sustainable Catalytic Asymmetric Oxidations. CRC Press. ISBN 978-1-4665-8859-2.
- Talsi, Evgenii; Bryliakov, Konstantin (2017). Applications of EPR and NMR Spectroscopy in Homogeneous Catalysis. CRC Press. ISBN 978-1-4987-4263-4.
