= Nikolay Dikansky =

Russian physicist

- Born: 30 July 1941 (age 85); Dymytrov, Stalino Oblast, Ukrainian SSR, Soviet Union
- Education: Novosibirsk State University
- Scientific career
- Fields: Physics

Nikolay Sergeevich Dikansky (Russian: Николай Сергеевич Диканский; born 30 July 1941) — is a Russian/Soviet physicist, a scientist in the fields of accelerator physics and particle accelerators, the head of the laboratory in Budker Institute of Nuclear Physics, since 2011 academician of Russian Academy of Sciences, the chancellor of Novosibirsk State University (20 November 1997 – 30 July 2007).

Nikolay Dikansky was born in 1941 in Dymytrov city (nowadays Myrnohrad) of Donetsk Oblast. In 1964 he graduated from Physical Department of Novosibirsk State University and continued his postgraduate studies in Budker Institute of Nuclear Physics. Since 1962 he has been a laboratory assistant in the same institute.

In 1976 Nikolay Dikansky defended his Ph.D. thesis and created the laboratory which he still in the charge of. Nowadays he is the senior staff scientist of Budker Institute of Nuclear Physics. His main achievements are connected with the first in the world experiments of proton beams` electronic cooling in storage rings.

He is the professor of Novosibirsk State University since 1981, dean of the Physical Department (1982-1990). Nikolay Dikansky is married and has two children.

Educational offices
Preceded by Vladimir Vragov	Rector of Novosibirsk State University; 1997–2007	Succeeded by Vladimir Sobyanin
