= Nikolay Kochetkov =

Soviet chemist and academician

- Nikolay Kochetkov in 1970s
- Born: Nikolay Konstantinovich Kochetkov; May 18, 1915; Moscow, Russian Empire
- Died: December 21, 2005 (aged 90); Moscow, Russia
- Education: Moscow Institute of Fine Chemical Technology (MITKhT) (BS); Moscow State University (PhD); Moscow State University (Grand PhD)
- Known for: Carbohydrate research
- Awards: Order of Lenin (1971); Order of the Badge of Honour (1976); Order of the Patriotic War (1985); Hero of Socialist Labour (1985); SAS Gold Medal (1986); Lenin Prize (1988); Haworth Memorial Lectureship (1989); Demidov Prize (1993); Lomonosov Gold Medal (1995)
- Scientific career
- Fields: Organic chemistry; Biochemistry
- Workplaces: Dorogomilovo Chemical Plant (1932–1934); Moscow State University (1945–1960); Institute of Pharmacology and Chemotherapy (1954–1960); Institute of Bioorganic Chemistry (1959–1966); N. D. Zelinsky Institute of Organic Chemistry (1966–2005)
- Doctoral advisor: Alexander Nikolayevich Nesmeyanov
- Other academic advisors: Alexander Nikolayevich Nesmeyanov
- Doctoral students: Georgii B. Elyakov; Eduard E. Nifantiev; Yuri S. Ovodov; Mikhail P. Koroteev; Alexander M. Koroteev

Nikolay Konstantinovich Kochetkov (Russian: Никола́й Константи́нович Кочетко́в; May 18, 1915 – December 21, 2005) was a Soviet chemist and academician (1979). He published about 1,200 scientific papers, 50 reviews and more than 10 patents. He was awarded the Lomonosov Gold Medal in 1994.

== Career ==
Kochetkov worked in the study of carbohydrates.

== Published works ==
- Special Issue: Synthesis and Structure of Glycans
