= Nikolai Litus =

Ukrainian film director (1925–2022)

- Літус Микола
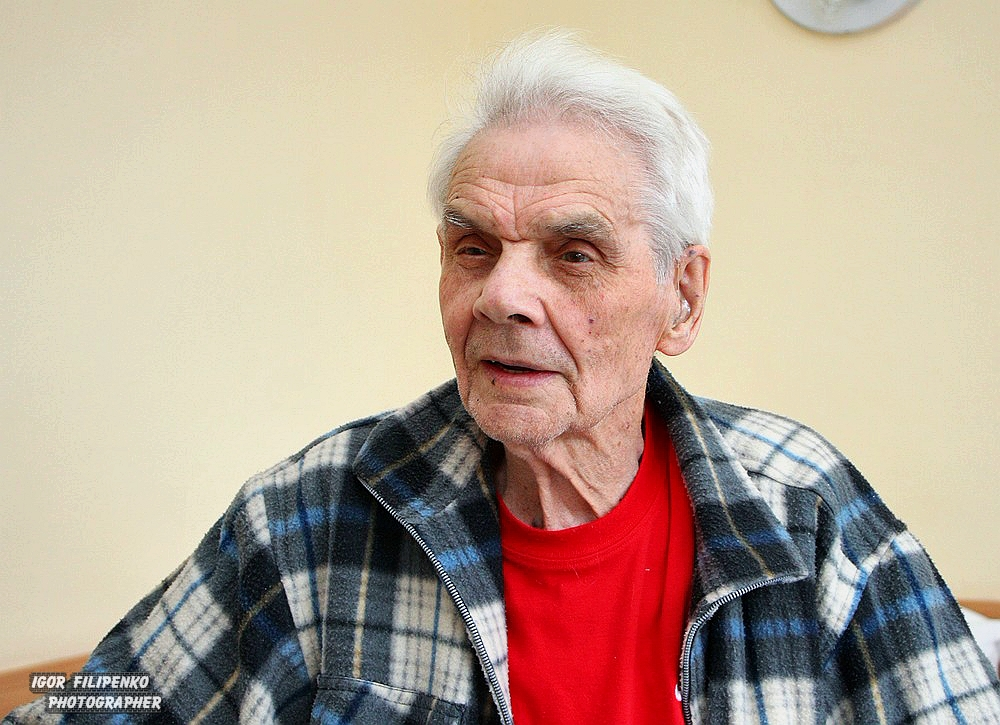
- Litus in 2021
- Born: Nikolai Gnatovich Litus; 15 January 1925; Tsybuliv, Cherkasy Oblast, Ukrainian SSR, Soviet Union
- Died: 21 February 2022 (aged 97); Kirovohrad Oblast, Ukraine
- Other names: Mykola Litus, Mikola Lytus
- Education: Kirov State University; Gerasimov Institute of Cinematography
- Occupation: Director

Nikolai Gnatovich Litus (Ukrainian: Літус Микола Гнатович; 15 January 1925 – 21 February 2022) was a Ukrainian film director. He was a Merited Artist of Ukraine.

== Life and career ==
Born in Tsybuliv, a village in the Uman Raion district, after graduating from the Leningrad Infantry School he fought in the Eastern Front of World War II. After the war he graduated in history at the Kirov Pedagogical Institute (today Vyatka State University), and later studied directing at the Gerasimov Institute of Cinematography and worked as an assistant of Alexander Zarkhi.

The feature film debut he co-directed with Shamsi Kiamov, Moi Drug Navrusov ("My Friend Navrusov") was censored and never screened because of its criticism of Soviet bureaucracy. He later directed documentaries and some popular films for Dovzhenko Film Studios, notably the 1963 comedy Queen of the Gas Station.

Beyond his cinema activity, between 1968 and 1983 Litus was lecturer at the Kyiv National I. K. Karpenko-Kary Theatre, Cinema and Television University.

Litus died in Kirovohrad Oblast on 21 February 2022, at the age of 97.
