= Myrnohrad =

City in Donetsk Oblast, Ukraine

Myrnohrad Мирноград
- City
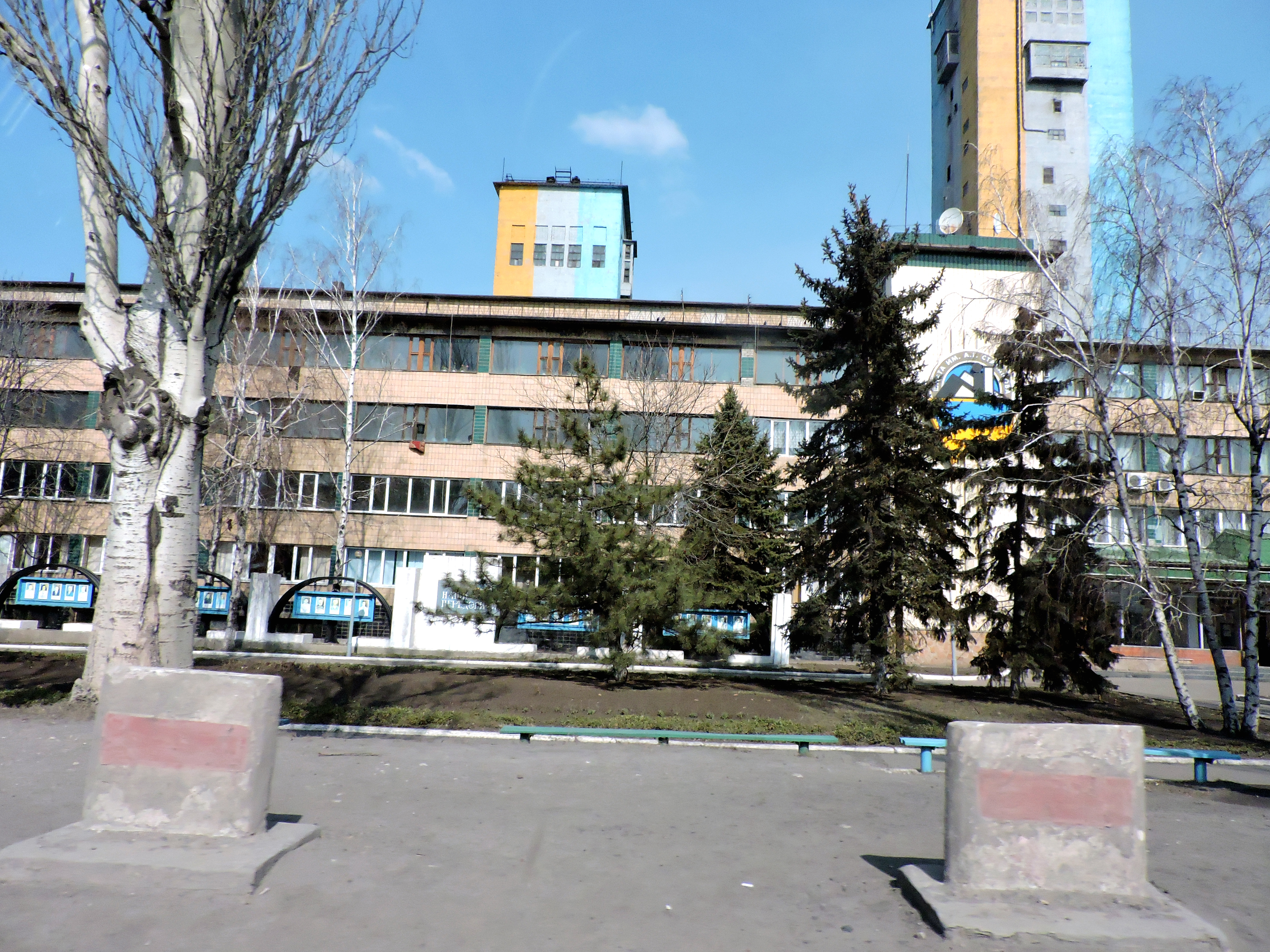
- Kapitalna Coal Mine in Myrnohrad

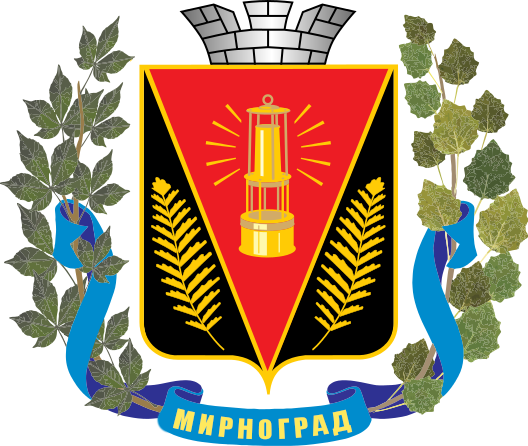
- Flag Coat of arms
- Interactive map of Myrnohrad
- Location within Donetsk Oblast Location within Ukraine
- Coordinates: 48°17′28″N 37°16′05″E
- Country: Ukraine
- Oblast: Donetsk
- Raion: Pokrovsk
- Hromada: Myrnohrad urban
- Founded: 1911
- City status: 1965

Government
  - Body: City council
  - Mayor: Oleksandr Leonidovich Brykalov

Area
  - Total: 23 km^{2} (8.9 sq mi)
- Elevation: 183 m (600 ft)

Population (2022)
  - Total: 46,098
  - Density: 2,000/km^{2} (5,200/sq mi)
- Website: https://myrnograd-rada.gov.ua/

Myrnohrad (Ukrainian: Мирноград, pronounced [mɪrnoˈɦrɑd]; Russian: Мирноград, romanized: Mirnograd), formerly Dymytrov (Note: Ukrainian: Димитров; Russian: Димитров, romanized: Dimitrov) until 2016, is a city in Pokrovsk Raion, Donetsk Oblast, eastern Ukraine. It was a city of regional significance before the status was abolished in 2020. The city had 46,098 (2022 estimate) inhabitants. Warfare evacuations reduced the civilian population to 1,658 (2024 estimate).

The city was previously named after Georgi Dimitrov, a prominent Bulgarian and Soviet communist politician, but was renamed in 2016 as a result of decommunization laws.

== Symbols ==
=== Flag ===
The city flag was approved by decision No. IV/5-8 of the 5th session of the 4th convocation of the City Council on September 10, 2002. It is a rectangular cloth with a width-to-length ratio of 2:3, in red and black, depicting a golden antique miner's lamp with five golden rays on the right and left, and two golden fern stems.

=== Coat of Arms ===
Approved by Resolution No. IV/5-8 of the 5th Session of the City Council of the 4th Convocation on September 10, 2002. Authors: P. V. Chesnokov, S. I. Potyugov. The design is identical to the flag: a red inverted arrowhead, edged in gold, is depicted on a black field, surmounted by a golden antique miner's lamp with five golden rays on each side, flanked by two golden fern stems. The shield is topped with a silver three-pronged city crown and framed on each side by tree branches—a chestnut branch on the right and a natural-colored poplar branch on the left. The branches are entwined with a blue ribbon with the city's name inscribed at the bottom in gold letters.

The black color and the miner's lamp indicate rich coal deposits and the mining industry.

== History ==
The historical predecessors of the city of Myrnohrad were two mining settlements formed near coal mines - Novoekonomichne (1911) and Hrodivka (1916). These two settlements were built in the early twentieth century on land leased from the rural communities of Novoekonomichne and Hrodivka villages. During the Ukrainian War of Independence, from 1917 to 1920, the settlements passed between various factions. Afterwards, they were administratively part of the Donets Governorate of Ukraine. In 1934, mine No. 5-6 (Hrodivka mine) was named after Georgi Dimitrov.

From October 1941 to September 1943, the city was under the occupation of Nazi Germany during World War II.

In 1966, probably as a result of prolonged heavy rains, a part of the mine 5/6 mine terricone in Myrnohrad collapsed, completely demolishing buildings on Sadova, Zhdanov, and Rozynska streets. Everyone who was in the buildings and nearby was killed. The authorities then hid the tragedy from the public.

In 1972, the mining villages of Novoekonomichne and Dymytriv were united under the common name of Dymytriv. This mining town was named after the Bulgarian politician, the first communist ruler of Bulgaria, Georgi Dimitrov, in honor of his friendship with the Bulgarian people, whose representatives worked in the mines in the 1960s. In August 1990, Dimitrov was granted the status of a city of regional significance.

=== Russo-Ukrainian War ===
Unlike in most of the larger cities in Donetsk Oblast, an unrecognized independence referendum in May 2014 was not held in the city.

On 17 January 2015, the city dismantled the monument to Lenin.

On 21 March 2016, in accordance with the law on decommunization, Dimitrov's deputies chose a new name and voted to rename the city Myrnohrad.

On 12 May 2016, the Verkhovna Rada renamed the city of Dymytriv to Myrnohrad. The relevant bill No. 4468 was voted for by 265 MPs. The renaming came into force on 22 May 2016. On 20 May, a monument of Georgi Dimitrov was demolished in the city.

On 27 February 2023, during Russia's full-scale invasion of Ukraine, Russians launched a missile attack on the city, damaging a kindergarten.

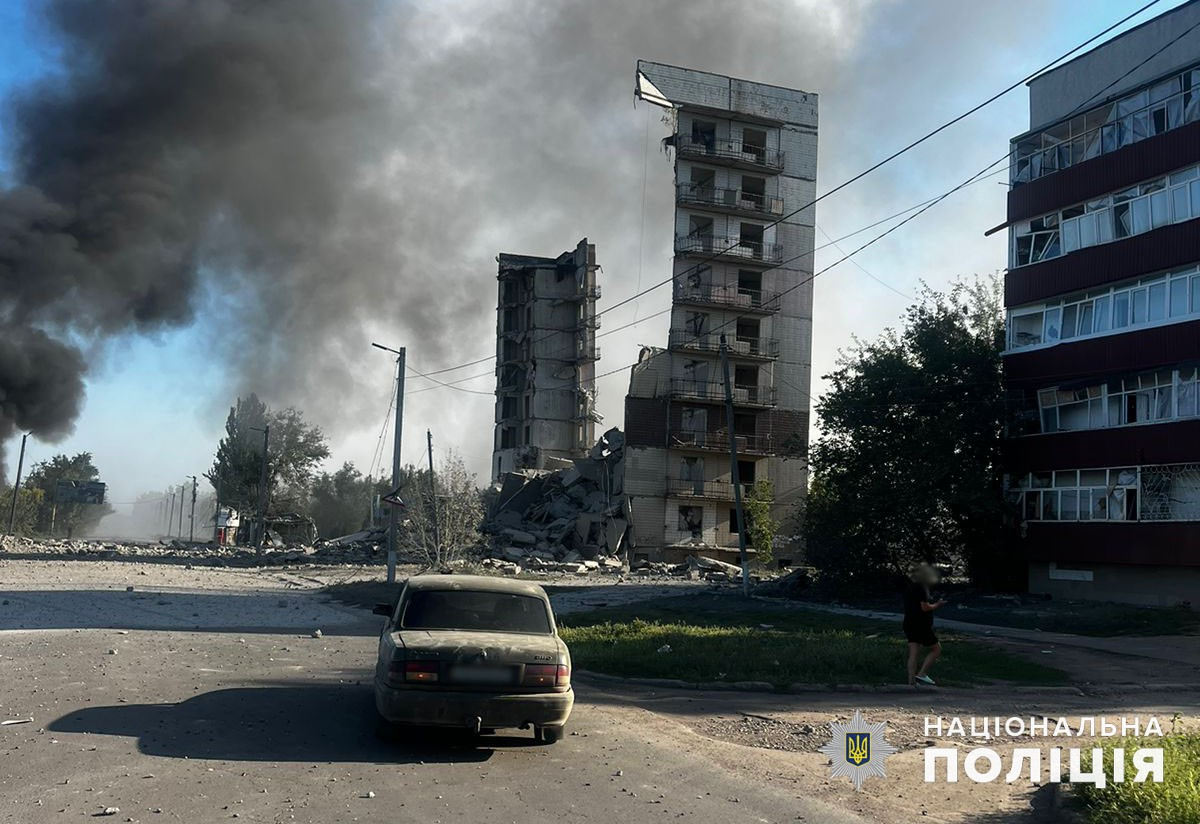
Residential building in Myrnohrad after Russian bombing on 17 August 2024

Since the onset of Russia's offensive to reach Pokrovsk in July 2024, their forces have advanced increasingly closer to Myrnohrad; on 13 August, a Ukrainian soldier said that Russian forces in the area were tasked with the city's capture, and on 16 August, Ukrainian officials reported that Russia was six kilometers from the city. The recent advances led the population to be ordered to evacuate, with an estimated 20,000 people remaining in the city on 16 August, and a complete evacuation expected by the end of August 2024. On 19 August, Head of the Myrnohrad Military Administration Yuriy Tretyak warned that only one to three days are left to evacuate the city in face of advancing Russian troops, and that Myrnohrad was shelled for several days already.

On 29 August, Russian forces reportedly entered the southern outskirts of Myrnohrad, although whether these were only reconnaissance groups or if actual soldiers were in the city was disputed.

In wake of Russia's offensive towards Pokrovsk, in late 2024 and January 2025, Myrnohrad saw a steady advancement of Russian forces on the town. Since the start of battle, it has been subjected to heavy bombardment, including the shelling of a hospital. As of 12 December 2025, after the end of Pokrovsk siege, the town was fully encircled by Russian forces and main battles are taking place in the central part. As of late December 2025, at least half or most of the town was under Russian control. By 31 December 2025, the entire Myrnohrad city center and Svitle district were captured by Russian forces. By late January 2026, the city was reportedly under "near-total" Russian control. On 4 February 2026, ISW reported that Russian forces had captured Myrnohrad.

== Geography ==
The city of Myrnograd is located in the steppe zone of the southeastern part of Ukraine, in the southwest of the Donetsk ridge. The city is part of the Prydniprovsky agro-soil region. The soil is formed by forests and forest-like loams. The soil cover mainly consists of ordinary black soil.

The climate is moderately continental. Strong winds are characteristic, high air temperatures in summer, and showers. The coldest months of the year are January and February, with an average temperature of −4.8 °C, and the warmest month is June, with an average temperature of +26.4 °C. The average amount of precipitation is 524 mm. The prevailing winds are from the east and southeast. The depth of soil freezing is up to 1 meter. The relief is a steppe plain, cut by a ravine-river network of the Rodinskaya and Sennaya gullies. The hydrography of the territory is represented by streams and drains that flow at the bottom of the gullies. Groundwater in the floodplains of the gullies lies at a depth of 0.5 to 3 m, on the plateau and slopes - above 10 m.

For Myrnograd as an industrial city, along with other social problems, the most urgent are the improvement of the environmental situation and optimization of natural resources. The environmental situation of the city is characterized as tense and requires the implementation of a set of measures. The city is home to 6 industrial enterprises: 3 mines, a beneficiation plant, a RMZ, the Buddetal plant, 12 enterprises providing services to coal enterprises, and 3 automobile enterprises. The most acute problems of the city are pollution of air and water basins. In 2002, stationary pollution facilities emitted 38,508 thousand tons of harmful substances into the atmosphere, including solids — 2,541 tons, gaseous and liquid — 35,961 tons. Most of the emissions of harmful substances are from coal industry and municipal enterprises. High concentrations of emissions are observed within the sanitary protection zones of enterprises. To improve the environmental situation, a number of measures are envisaged that take into account the prevention of pollution of air, water basins, and soil.

== Demographics ==
Year	Inhabitants
1923	4589
1927	5509
1939	9642
1959	15 343
1970	20 832
1979	58 793
1987	62 000
1989	63 254
1992	63 700
1994	63 400
1998	59 400
2002	54 787
2003	54 114
2004	53 544
2005	52 901
2006	52 241
2007	51 799
2008	51 220
2009	50 939
2010	50 636
2011	50 251
2012	49 987
2013	49 646
2014	49 519
2015	49 353
2016	49 021
2017	48 839
2018	48 434
2019	47 957
2020	47 460
2021	46 904

As of the 2001 Ukrainian census:

Ethnicity

- Ukrainians: 64.2%
- Russians: 31.3%
- Tatars: 0.7%
- Belarusians: 0.6%
- Armenians: 0.2%

Language

- Russian: 71.8%
- Ukrainian: 26.0%
- Armenian: 0.1%
- Belarusian: 0.1%

== City districts ==
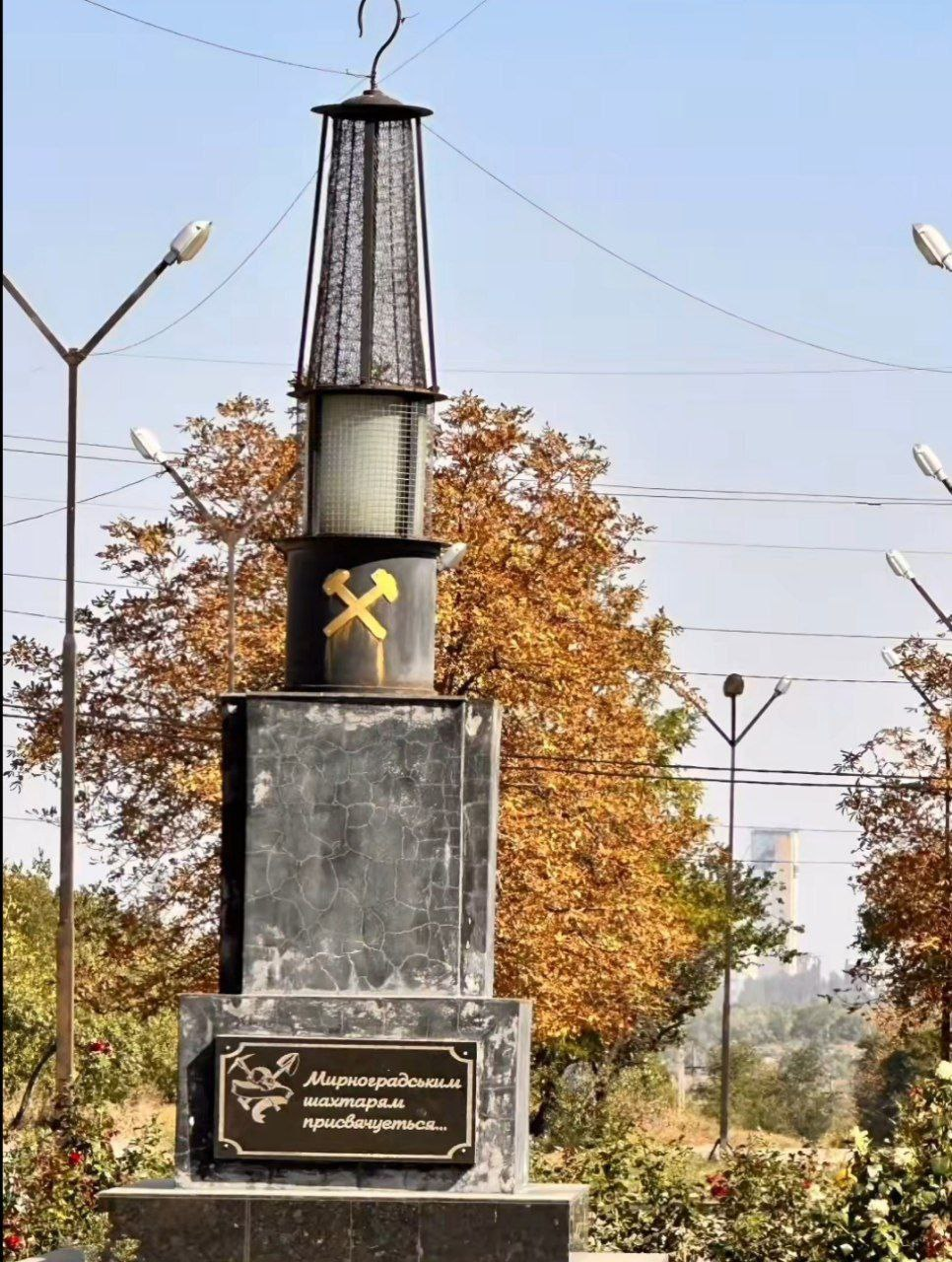
Monument to the miners of Myrnohrad

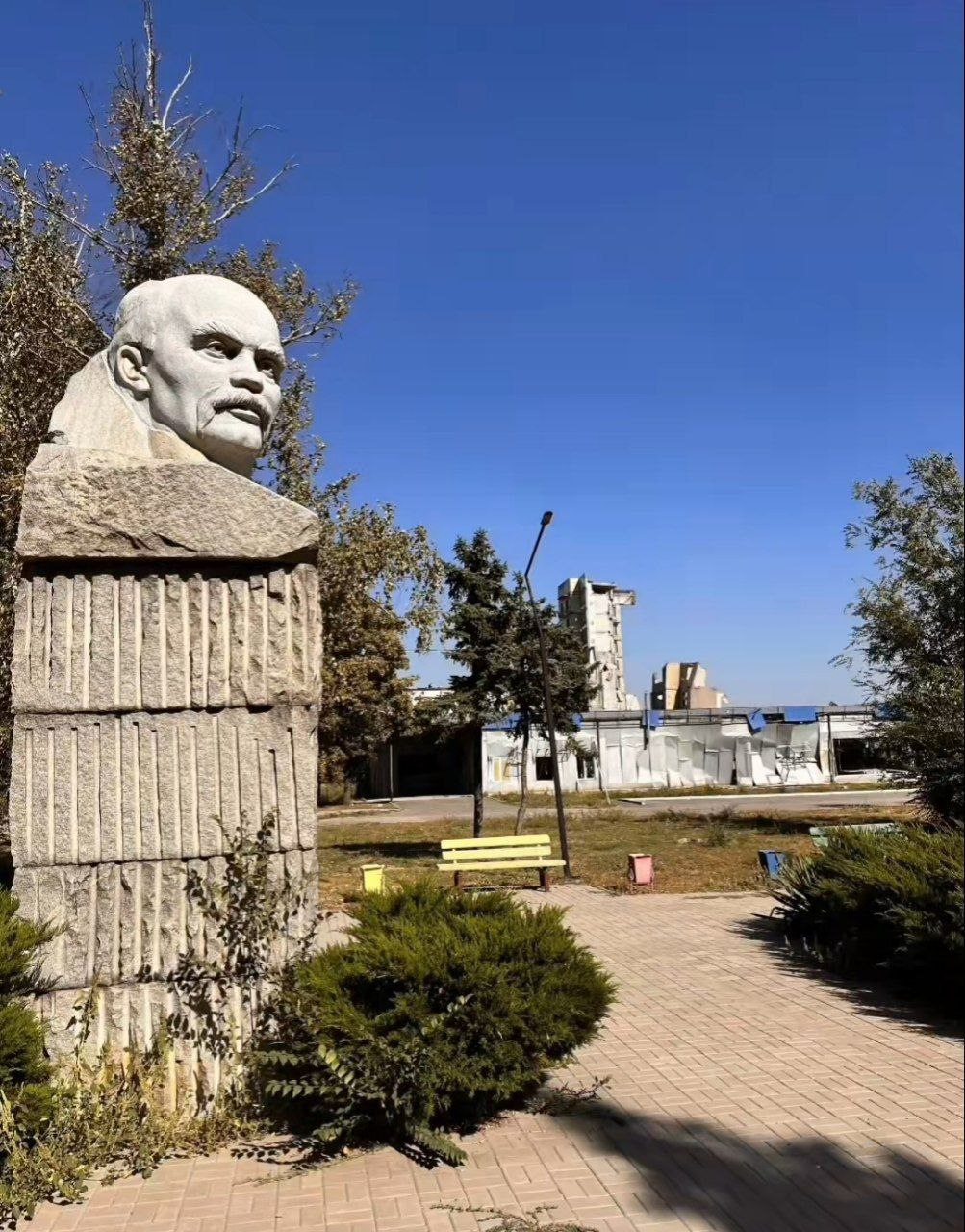
Monument to Taras Shevchenko

- City Center
- Standard District
- Molodezhny Microdistrict
- Svetly Microdistrict
- Vostochny Microdistrict
- Zapadny Microdistrict
- Block 40
- Former Novator Mine Settlement
- 5-6 Mine Settlement
- Vosmoy Microdistrict
- Bryanka Microdistrict
- Pobeda Microdistrict

== Hospitals and outpatient clinics ==
- "Central" hospital
- "Medical" outpatient clinic ("Molodyzhny" district) As a result of Russian shelling on March 8, 2024, the institution was damaged and ceased to operate; Outpatient clinics in other districts of the city.
- "Infectious Diseases" hospital (Soborna St., Shakhty District 5/6) On July 27, 2024, the facility was destroyed by Russian shelling; earlier, on July 17, 2024, the facility was closed due to its proximity to the contact line.

== Economy ==
The main city employer is a mining company "Myrnohradvuhillya" (formerly Krasnoarmiyskvuhillya, after the city's central train station) along with refining factory "Komsomolska".

- Myrnohradvuhillya
  - Kapitalna coal mine (formerly Stakhanov coal mine)
  - Tsentralna coal mine
  - Dymytrova coal mine
  - Rodynska coal mine

== Notable people ==
- Vladimir Kozlov — Olympic champion, bobsleigh (1988)
- Viktor Burakov (1955-2025) — Ukrainian athlete, Olympic champion (1980)
- Nikolay Sergeyevich Dikansky — Soviet and Russian physicist, Doctor of Sciences, academician of the Russian Academy of Sciences
- Volodymyr Serhiyovych Kapustin (1992—2023) — soldier and participant of the Russian-Ukrainian war
- Nonna Koperzhynska — Ukrainian theater and film actress, People's Artist of the Ukrainian SSR (1967).(She studied in Myrnograd as a child)
- Roman Minin — modern Ukrainian artist and representative of the direction Slob-art
- Olexii Chernyshov — private of the Ministry of Internal Affairs of Ukraine, battalion Dnipro-1, studied and died in battle in Myrnohrad, awarded the Order for Courage III degree and got a street named after him in the city.
- Yuriy Volodymyrovych — ensign of the Security Services of Ukraine, awarded the Order for Courage
- Andrey Emelyanovich Dudarenko — Hero of the Soviet Union (1945)
- Fyodor Yakovlevich Kukharev — Hero of the Soviet Union (1944) (Worked in Myrnograd)
- Grigory Semyonovich Gaponov — Hero of the Soviet Union (1945) (Worked in Myrnograd)
- Pavel Semyonovich Kitchenko — Hero of the Soviet Union (1943) (Worked in Myrnograd)
- Sobolev Valery Viktorovich is a Ukrainian scientist in the field of mining engineering. Doctor of technical sciences, professor. Academician Academy of Sciences of Higher Education of Ukraine since 1993 (worked in Myrnograd)
- Mykola Karpovich Ryazantsev — Ukrainian Soviet leader, chief designer of the Kharkiv Design Bureau for Engine Construction at the Malyshev Plant
- Mykola Semenovich Momot — Ukrainian opera and concert singer, soloist of the Donetsk National Academic Theater of Opera and Ballet named after A. B. Solovyanenko, professor of the academic singing department of the Donetsk State Music Academy named after S. S. Prokofiev, People's Artist of Ukraine (worked in Myrnograd)
- Ivan Ivanovych Brydko — twice Hero of Socialist Labor(1948,1957)
- Valentin Polyakov (1993—2023)—Junior sergeant, participant in the Russian-Ukrainian war.
- Timofey Viktorovych Puhalsky (1987—2018) — private first class, participant in the Russian-Ukrainian war.
- Vitaliy Prokopovych Stepchenko (1967—2018) — master of sports of Ukraine of the international class in kickboxing, coach, six-time champion of Ukraine.
- Andriy Oleksandrovych Chirva (1972—2018) — private first class, participant in the Russian-Ukrainian war.
- Andriy Viktorovy Shirokov (1970—2016) — soldier of the Armed Forces of Ukraine, participant in the Russian-Ukrainian war.
- Ilya Yakimovich Shutov Status — Fighter for the independence of Ukraine in the 20th century, public figure, scientist, lawyer, journalist — an active participant in the national liberation struggle for the independence and democratic system of Ukraine. (He worked in Myrnograd)
