= Sobyanin =

Sobyanin (Russian: Собянин) is a Russian masculine surname, its feminine counterpart is Sobyanina. Notable people with the surname include:

- Sergey Sobyanin (born 1958), Russian statesman and politician
- Vladimir Sobyanin (born 1952), Russian scientist
