= NMR (disambiguation) =

NMR, or nuclear magnetic resonance, is a spectroscopic technique based on change of nuclear spin state.

NMR or nmr may also refer to:

== Applications of nuclear magnetic resonance ==
- Nuclear magnetic resonance spectroscopy
- Solid-state nuclear magnetic resonance
- Protein nuclear magnetic resonance spectroscopy
- Proton nuclear magnetic resonance
- Carbon-13 nuclear magnetic resonance
- Magnetic resonance imaging
- Surface nuclear magnetic resonance, geophysical technique
- Benchtop nuclear magnetic resonance spectrometer

== History and culture ==
- National Military Council (Suriname) (Nationale Militaire Raad), 1980s military junta
- Natal Mounted Rifles, a South African army regiment
- National Monuments Record, now the Historic England Archive
- Nilgiri Mountain Railway, Tamil Nadu, India

== Politics ==
- Nordic Resistance Movement, neo-Nazi movement

== Entertainment and media ==
- Nielsen Media Research, an American TV ratings company
- NewMediaRockstars, a news website

== Other uses ==
- Nimbari language, an ISO 639-3 code
