= Surface nuclear magnetic resonance =

Technique used in hydrogeology

Surface nuclear magnetic resonance (SNMR), also known as magnetic resonance Sounding (MRS), is a geophysical technique specially designed for hydrogeology. It is based on the principle of nuclear magnetic resonance (NMR) and measurements can be used to indirectly estimate the water content of saturated and unsaturated zones in the earth's subsurface. SNMR is used to estimate aquifer properties, including the quantity of water contained in the aquifer, porosity, and hydraulic conductivity.

== History ==
The MRS technique was originally conceived in the 1960s by Russell H. Varian, one of the inventors of the proton magnetometer. SNMR is a product of a joint effort by many scientists and engineers who started developing this method in the USSR under the guidance of A.G. Semenov and continued this work all over the world. Semenov's team used nuclear magnetic resonance (NMR) for non-invasive detection of proton-containing liquids (hydrocarbons or water) in the subsurface. The Voevodsky Institute of Chemical Kinetics and Combustion of the Siberian Branch of the Russian Academy of Sciences fabricated the first version of the instrument for measurements of magnetic resonance signals from subsurface water ("hydroscope") in 1981.

== Principles ==
The basic principle of operation of magnetic resonance sounding, hitherto known as surface proton magnetic resonance (PMR), is similar to that of the proton magnetometer. They both assume records of the magnetic resonance signal from a proton-containing liquid (for example, water or hydrocarbons). However, in the proton magnetometer, a special sample of liquid is placed into the receiving coil and only the signal frequency is a matter of interest. In MRS, a wire loop 100 m in diameter is used as a transmitting/receiving antenna to probe water in the subsurface. Thus, the main advantage of the MRS method, compared with other geophysical methods, is that the surface measurement of the PMR signal from water molecules ensures that this method only responds to the subsurface water.

A typical MRS survey is conducted in three stages. First, the ambient electromagnetic (EM) noise is measured. Then, a pulse of electrical current is transmitted through a cable on the surface of the ground, applying an external EM field to the subsurface. Finally, the external EM field is terminated, and the magnetic resonance signal is measured.

Three parameters of the measured MRS signal are:

- Amplitude (E0), which depends on the number of protons and hence on the quantity of water.
- Decay time (T*2), which generally correlates with the mean size of the pores in water-saturated rocks. This is important for aquifer characterization.
- Phase (j0), which is measured in the field and is used for a qualitative estimation of the electrical conductivity of rocks.

As with many other geophysical methods, MRS is site-dependent. Modeling results show that MRS performance depends on the magnitude of the natural geomagnetic field, the electrical conductivity of rocks, the electromagnetic noise and other factors

== Usage ==
SNMR can be used in both oil and water exploration, but since oil is generally deep down, the more common usage is in water exploration. With depth resolution of 200 meter, SNMR is the best way to model aquifers.

== See also ==
- Aquifer storage and recovery
- Aquifer properties
- Groundwater model
- Groundwater pollution
- Hydraulic tomography
- Nuclear magnetic resonance
- Earth's field NMR
