= Vladimir Vragov =

- Born: 2 October 1945; Urgench, Uzbek Soviet Socialist Republic
- Died: 4 June 2002 (aged 56)
- Education: Novosibirsk State University
- Scientific career
- Fields: Mathematics

Vladimir Vragov (Russian: Владимир Николаевич Врагов; 2 October 1945, Urgench — 4 June 2002) — was a Russian/Soviet mathematician and scientist.

== Biography ==
Vladimir Vragov was born in 1945 in Urgench, Uzbek Soviet Socialist Republic in a driver`s family. It was a hard period after war and the family had to emigrate a lot. Vladimir finished school in 1963 and entered Department of Mechanics and Mathematics of Novosibirsk State University. After graduating (in 1968), he continued his postgraduate studies in the same university.

Practically all of Vragov`s scientific activities were connected with Institute of Mathematics of Siberian Department of RAS. Vladimir became PhD in 1971. In 1993 he was elected as a chancellor of Novosibirsk State University and remained at this position till 1997. Vladimir Vragov had been the head of UNESCO chair of SD RAS since the spring of 1997.
