= Queen of the Gas Station =

- Directed by: Oleksiy Mishurin; Nikolai Litus
- Written by: Petro Lubens'kyi
- Starring: Nadezhda Rumyantseva; Andriy Sova; Alexei Kozhevnikov; Yuri Belov
- Cinematography: Mykhaylo Ivanov; Olexandr Pyshchikov
- Music by: Evheniy Zubtsov
- Production company: Dovzhenko Film Studios
- Release date: February 18, 1963
- Running time: 78 minutes
- Country: Soviet Union
- Language: Russian

Queen of the Gas Station (Russian: Королева бензоколонки, romanized: Koroleva benzkolonki) is a 1963 Soviet comedy film directed by Oleksiy Mishurin and Nikolai Litus.

The film took fifth place at the box office with 34.3 million viewers.

== Plot ==
Poltava resident Lyudmyla Dobryvechir (lit. 'Lyudmyla GoodEvening') tries become a TV announcer but does not pass the audition because of her bad diction. She dreams of becoming a flight attendant on the Tu-104 — but this also does not come to pass. Now Lyudmyla is once again preparing to join the ensemble "Ballet on Ice". She compensates the lack of ice with training on roller skates and temporarily finds work as a gas station attendant. Not everything works out for the new worker, but cheerful disposition and resourcefulness help her not only to master a new specialty, but also radically rebuild the operation of the gas station.

== Cast ==
- Nadezhda Rumyantseva - Lyudmila Dobriyvecher ("Dobry vechir" means "good evening" in Ukrainian)
- Andriy Sova - Panas Petrovich, Head of the Gas Station
- Alexei Kozhevnikov - Taras Shpychko, the driver of the UAZ with a portable film projector
- Nonna Koperzhynska - Rogneda Karpovna, barmaid at the gas station
- Yuri Belov - Slavka Koshovyi, driver of intercity passenger bus
- Vladimir Belokurov - Alexander Efimovich Medved' ("Bear"), the driver of the first class ("Medved'" means "bear" in Russian)
- Sergei Blinnikov - Comrade Babiy
- Victor Myagky - Comrade Borshch, road chief
- Mykola Yakovenko - Comrade Lopata, road chief
- Evgenia Opalova - teacher
- Viktor Khalatov - the seller in a department store
- Pavlo Vynnyk - Podorozhny, Senior Lieutenant, Automobile Inspector
- Alexander Khvylya - bus passenger, priest
- Sergey Shemetilo - freight forwarder
- Mikhail Kramar - driver
- Nikolay Panasiev - Valeriy Grach, Slavko's partner

== Filming ==
The artistic council and most of the members of the film crew offered Nadezhda Rumyantseva for the main role, but the director sought to avoid cliches, and insisted on the candidacy of the little-known Estonian actress Terje Luik. Enough material was filmed with Luik, but at the working screening, the studio's management decided to remove her, because she was "too intelligent, cold and introverted," and comedy does not work. The following year, filming resumed anew with the previously approved Rumyantseva. This time, the direction was entrusted to the experienced Alexei Myshurin, who insisted that Litus be left in the film as a second director.

The events of the movie revolve around a gas station on a highway between Kyiv and Kharkiv, filmed in Pyriatyn, Poltava Oblast. The film was shot on the territory of an operating gas station, however, due to the fire-unsafe lighting equipment at the gas station, the crew had to build a "filming" gas station nearby (the real gas station was located behind a fake desk). Nikolai Litus said that the fake gas station was so similar to the real one that one day a truck drove onto the set, the driver of which demanded to refuel it. The acting trio Rumyantseva — Sova — Vynnyk tricked him: they refused to fill him up and also wanted to fine him for rudeness, but then they apologized and explained that a movie was being filmed here. As a result, the driver was not offended by the actors, and the episode itself was subsequently included in the film.

The film featured many cars from the 1950s and early 1960s. The characters of the film Slavka and Bear ride the LAZ-Ukraine-1 bus (1961) and the BelAZ-540 truck (1962), and Cadillac Series 62 appears in the episode with foreigners.

== Reviews ==
Film critic Alexander Fedorov noted: "Soviet film critics actually dismissed the "Queen of the Gas Station". ... But in the XXI century, this comedy has become, in fact, a cult one – both among viewers and film critics".

== Legacy ==
The name of this movie was referenced on the second track of American singer Lana Del Rey's debut eponymous album, Lana Del Ray A.K.A. Lizzy Grant.
