= N. D. Zelinsky Institute of Organic Chemistry =

Research institute

- Институт органической химии имени Н. Д. Зелинского РАН
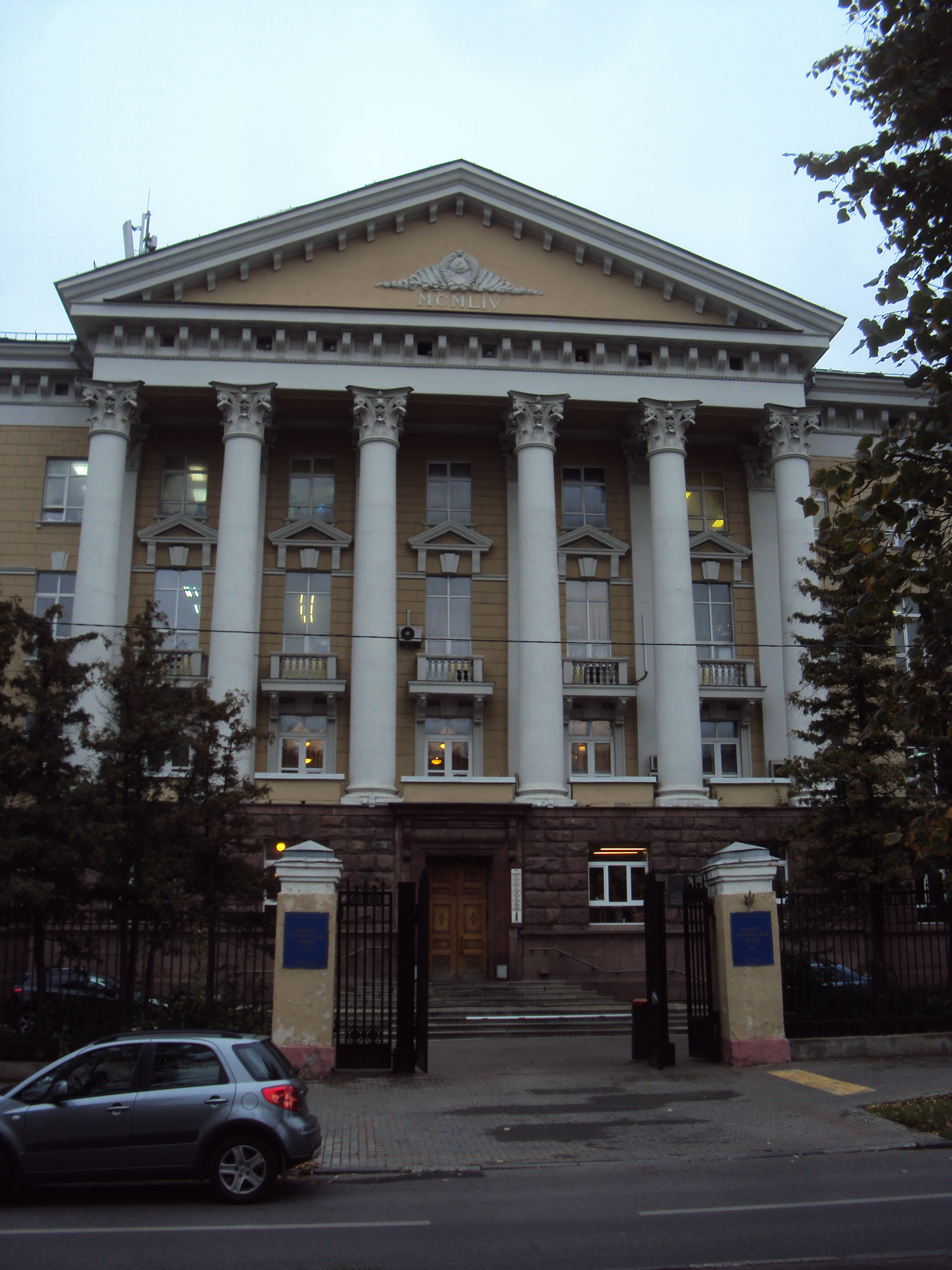
- Other names: ZIOC
- Type: Research institute
- Established: 23 February 1934
- Director: Alexander Olegovich Terentyev
- Location: Russia, 119991, Moscow, Leninsky Prospekt, 47, Moscow, Russia; 55.7021°N 37.5718°E
- Website: https://zioc.ru/?lang=en

N. D. Zelinsky Institute of Organic Chemistry (ZIOC) is one of the research institutes of the Russian Academy of Sciences in the field of chemistry. The institute employs more than 900 people in 39 research laboratories and groups. It is located in Moscow.

== History ==
The institute was founded on February 23, 1934, in Moscow on the basis of the High Pressure Laboratory and the Organic Synthesis Laboratory. Among the founders were academicians A. E. Favorsky, N. D. Zelinsky, V. N. Ipatiev, A. E. Chichibabin, and later N. Ya. Demyanov, M. A. Ilyinsky and others. In 1953, the institute was named after Academician N. D. Zelinsky, who headed one of the departments from 1936 to 1953. The world fame of the institute is associated with the names of many prominent scientists who worked there. Among them are academicians A. E. Favorsky, N. D. Zelinsky, A. A. Balandin, B. A. Kazansky, A. N. Nesmeyanov, I. N. Nazarov, I. L. Knunyants, A. E. Porai-Koshits, V. V. Korshak, L. F. Vereshchagin, M. M. Shemyakin, M. I. Kabachnik, H. M. Minachev.

During the Great Patriotic War, carbinol glue (Nazarov glue) was developed for repairing military equipment in the field.

Synthesis methods were developed and batches of drugs were produced, including the drug vinylin (Shostakovsky balm).

Nesmeyanov Institute of Organoelement Compounds, Institute of High Pressure Physics in 1954, and Institute of natural compounds chemistry (INCC) (now Shemyakin-Ovchinnikov Institute of Bioorganic Chemistry) in 1959 are separated from N. D. Zelinsky Institute of Organic Chemistry. At the same time, the traditional areas of research at the ZIOC expanded and developed. Several other research centers were created with the support of scientists from the ZIOC. Among them are the A. E. Favorsky Irkutsk Institute of Chemistry, Institute of Bioorganic Chemistry of the National Academy of Sciences of Belarus, V. I. Nikitin Institute of chemistry and the Institute of Organic Chemistry of Turkmenistan.

The institute is located at Leninsky Prospekt, 47. The building was built in 1954 according to the design of the architect Alexey Shchusev.

== Directors ==
Since the founding of the institute, it has had seven directors:

1. Alexey Evgrafovich Favorsky (1934–1939)
2. Alexander Nikolayevich Nesmeyanov (1939–1954)
3. Boris Alexandrovich Kazansky (1954–1966)
4. Nikolai Konstantinovich Kochetkov (1966–1988)
5. Vladimir Aleksandrovich Tartakovsky (1988–2002)
6. Mikhail Petrovich Egorov (2003–2023)
7. Alexander Olegovich Terentyev (since 2024)

== Main fields of research ==
1. Physical and synthetic organic chemistry
2. Organic chemistry of natural compounds
3. Catalytic organic synthesis and physicochemical basis of catalysis
4. Computer chemistry and modern information technologies

== Discoveries and inventions ==
| # | Discoveries and inventions | Date | Inventor | Significance | Source |
|---|---|---|---|---|---|
| 1 | Reaction of aromatization (C6-dehydrocyclization) of paraffin hydrocarbons on platinized carbon | 1936 | Kazansky B.A. and Plate A.F. | This reaction took one of the central places in organic catalysis and in the chemistry of hydrocarbons and formed the basis of new methods for the production of aromatic hydrocarbons from petroleum feedstocks. | |
| 2 | Shostakovsky balm (“vinyline”) | 1940 | Favorsky A.E. and Shostakovsky M.F. | Polymers of vinyl ethers began to be actively used in military hospitals and medical battalions for the treatment of burns and frostbite. | |
| 3 | Nazarov glue (“carbinol”) | 1941 | Nazarov I.N. | Polymers with excellent adhesive properties became the basis for the creation of “carbinol” glue, unsurpassed at that time, which found wide application in aviation and mechanical engineering, for the repair of military equipment, for lining metro stations and in many other areas. | |
| 4 | Method for the production of gasoline-resistant thiokol rubber | 1941 | Balandin A.A. | Gas tanks made using this material turned out to be very reliable: after a bullet hit, practically no hole was formed in the tank - it immediately closed as a result of the plasticity of the material, which saved both the car and the flight crew. | |
| 5 | Resonant Raman scattering | 1952 | Shorygin P.P. | Dramatic expansion of the capabilities of the Raman scattering (RS) method. | |
| 6 | Promedol | 1949 | Nazarov I.N. | The most important opioid analgesic, analogue of prodine. | |
| 7 | Reaction of addition of allylboranes to acetylene | 1965 | Mikhailov B.M. | Based on these reactions, a fundamentally new method for the stereospecific synthesis of derivatives of cyclohexene, cyclohexane, pentadiene, heptadiene, diene alcohols, etc. was created. | |
| 8 | Ammonium dinitramide (ADNA) | 1971 | Tartakovsky V.A. and Lukyanov O.A. | One of the best oxidizers for solid rocket fuels; Among other advantages, ADNA is characterized by the environmental friendliness of combustion products due to the absence of chlorine atoms in their composition. Soon after the discovery of ADNA, a new major scientific and technical direction was created in the USSR related to the use of dinitramide salts in military equipment. All work on ammonium dinitramide was classified due to its use as a component of high-energy rocket fuels, including in the Topol-M missile systems. | |
| 9 | Mebicar (now better known as Adaptol®) | 1971 | Khmelnitsky L. I. | Anxiolytic, which is used in the treatment of neuroses and neurosis-like conditions at the present time. | |
| 10 | Mecygiston | 1973 | Akhrem A.A., Kamernitsky A.V., Kulikova L.E., Levina I.S., Titov Y.A. | According to copyright certificate No. 525702, which was issued by the USSR State Committee for Inventions and Discoveries, “a method for the preparation of 6-a-methyl-(1', 2', 16h, 17h)-cyclohexanopregn-4-ene-3,20-dione" can be used as a hormonal drug. | |
| 11 | Metsigepron | 1974 | Poskalenko A.N., Nikitina G.V., Korkhov V.V., Kamernitsky A.V., Kulikova L.E., Levina I.S., Akhrem A.A. | According to author's certificate No. 1140786, which was issued by the USSR State Committee for Inventions and Discoveries, “a remedy for threatened miscarriage, ovarian dysfunction and endometrial hyperplasia” is the first Soviet oral contraceptive. | |

== Facilities ==
- Fourier transform ion cyclotron resonance mass spectrometer (FT-ICR-MS) solariX XR 15T, Bruker, Germany, 2019

== Publishers ==
- Mendeleev Communications
- "Успехи химии" (in Russian); English translation: Russian Chemical Reviews
- “Кинетика и Катализ” (in Russian); English version: Kinetics and Catalysis
- "Известия АН. Серия химическая" (in Russian); English version: Russian Chemical Bulletin

== General references ==
- Monograph by A.M. Rubinstein "Institute of Organic Chemistry of N.D. Zelinsky" / "Nauka", 1995. (Монография А.М.Рубинштейна "Институт органической химии имени Н.Д.Зелинского" / «Наука», 1995).
