= Raissa Berg =

Russian geneticist (1913–2006)

Raissa L'vovna Berg
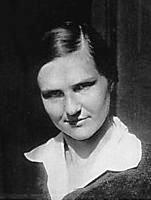
- Born: April 9 [O.S. March 27] 1913; St. Petersburg, Russia
- Died: March 1, 2006 (aged 92); Paris, France
- Education: Leningrad State University, Novosibirsk State University

Raissa L'vovna Berg (Russian: Раиса Львовна Берг; 1913–2006) was a Russian geneticist and evolutionary biologist.

== Early life ==
Raissa Berg was born in St. Petersburg, the second child of Lev Semyonovitch Berg and Polina Abramovna Kotlovker, both were Russian-Jews natives of Bendery (now Moldova) within the Jewish Pale. In order to study at Moscow University, Lev Berg chose to convert to Lutheranism and became a noted geographer and ichthyologist.

When Raissa Berg was six weeks old, her parents separated. Though her mother sued for custody, her father prevailed; he was a Christian and the Russian Orthodox Church decided such cases. Raissa and her brother Simon were baptized and raised by their father, paternal grandmother Klara L'vovna Berg, and stepmother Maria Mikhailovna Ivanova, who Lev Berg married in 1923.

== Education ==
Berg graduated from St. Petersburg's German Lutheran school in 1929. She then earned a diploma in genetics from Leningrad University, where she studied under H. J. Muller. With the dissertation "Differences between wild and laboratory populations of Drosophila melanogaster: a hypothesis of genetic correlations," she earned a Candidate of Sciences degree from Leningrad State University. She began work on a doctoral dissertation, "Species as an Evolving System," in the early 1940s and officially defended it in 1964, earning a Doctor of Sciences degree from Novosibirsk's Institute of Cytology and Genetics.

== Scientific career ==
After completing her studies in Leningrad, Berg moved to Moscow to work at the A. N. Severtsov Institute of Evolutionary Morphology under I. I. Schmalhausen. The institute was evacuated to Kazakhstan in 1941, but the following year Berg returned to Moscow to work on her doctoral dissertation. From 1944 to 1947 she worked as a senior researcher at the Severtsov Institute and part-time at the Zoological Institute of Moscow University. Lysenkoism pressured Soviet geneticists, pushing many researchers out of their institutions. By the time of Berg's dismissal from Moscow University, "there was only one geneticist at Moscow University's Department of Darwinism and one geneticist at the Institute of Evolutionary Morphology, and I was both of them." Berg continued botanical experiments to support her doctoral dissertation and published work relating to her father's expeditions.

In 1948, Berg began work as an associate professor of the Herzen Leningrad Pedagogical Institute, and in 1949 moved to the All-Union Research Institute of Lake and River Fish Management. She then worked at Leningrad State University; between 1954 and 1963 she was an assistant, then associate professor, and finally senior research associate. From 1964 to 1968, Berg headed the Laboratory of Population Genetics of the Institute of Cytology and Genetics and worked as a lecturer at Novosibirsk State University.

After being forced out of Novosibirsk in 1968, Berg returned to Leningrad. She headed a group at the Agrophysical Institute of VASKhNIL from 1968 to 1970 and was a professor at Herzen Leningrad Pedagogical University from 1968 to 1974.

In the mid-1970s, Berg emigrated to the United States. She held a position at the University of Wisconsin–Madison from 1975 to 1981, and from 1984 to 1984 was a visiting professor at Washington University in St. Louis. She traveled and lectured extensively before relocating to France in 1994.

== Political opinions ==
Berg was a non-conformist. The comparatively liberal Khrushchev regime and remote Novosibirsk Akademgorodok afforded her the opportunity to host gatherings of dissenter artists and writers. Along with several dozen other researchers working within the Siberian Division of the Russian Academy of Sciences, Berg signed a letter protesting the closed trials of dissidents. In 1968 she was condemned for "political irresponsibility" and retired from her work.

Berg wrote in defense of N. V. Timoféeff-Ressovsky, a Russian-born scientist working in Nazi Germany. She asserted that he was interested in pure research, politically opposed to the Third Reich, reasonably concerned for his safety in Stalin's Soviet Union, and unfairly persecuted following World War II. In her memoir, Acquired Traits, Berg chronicled her own challenges working within the Soviet system.

== Personal life ==
Berg married geneticist Valentin Sergeevich Kirpichnikov in 1945. The couple had two daughters, Elizaveta and Maria Kirpichnikova, born in 1947 and 1948, respectively.
