= Sergei Netyosov =

Sergei Viktorovich Netyosov (Russian: Сергей Викторович Нетёсов) is a Russian molecular biologist, a specialist in virus genomes.

== Biography ==
Sergei Netyosov was born on April 19, 1953, in Leninsk-Kuznetsky, Kemerovo Oblast.

In 1975 he graduated from the Faculty of Natural Sciences at the Novosibirsk State University.

In 1975–1977 he worked at the Vorozhtsov Novosibirsk Institute of Organic Chemistry as a trainee researcher. From 1977 to 2007 he was an employee of the All-Russian Research Institute of Molecular Biology of the Glavmikrobioprom (In 1986, the organization was included in the Vector Institute).

Netyosov has been living in Koltsovo since 1980.

Since 1994 he has lectured at Novosibirsk State University.

== Scientific activity ==
The scientist studies the genomes of human and animal viruses, viral proteins and participates in the development of antiviral vaccines.

He conducted research on the identification and analysis of the primary structures of a number of strains of influenza virus subtypes H1N1 and H5N1, Marburg and Ebola viruses, strain 205 of tick-borne encephalitis virus, hepatitis viruses A, B, C, E and G; revealed the presence of immunosuppressive domains in the genomes of filoviruses; conducted a large complex of works on accurate mapping of antigenic determinants of influenza and Venezuelan equine encephalomyelitis viruses etc.

The laboratory of a scientist, for example, is studying the mechanisms of filovirus replication based on a constructed mini-replicon of the Marburg virus.

The researcher has over 170 publications in Scopus, his h-index is 27.

Sergei Netyosov is a member of the Voprosy Virusologii Magazine editorial board.
