= Vladimir Shiltsev =

Russian-American accelerator physicist

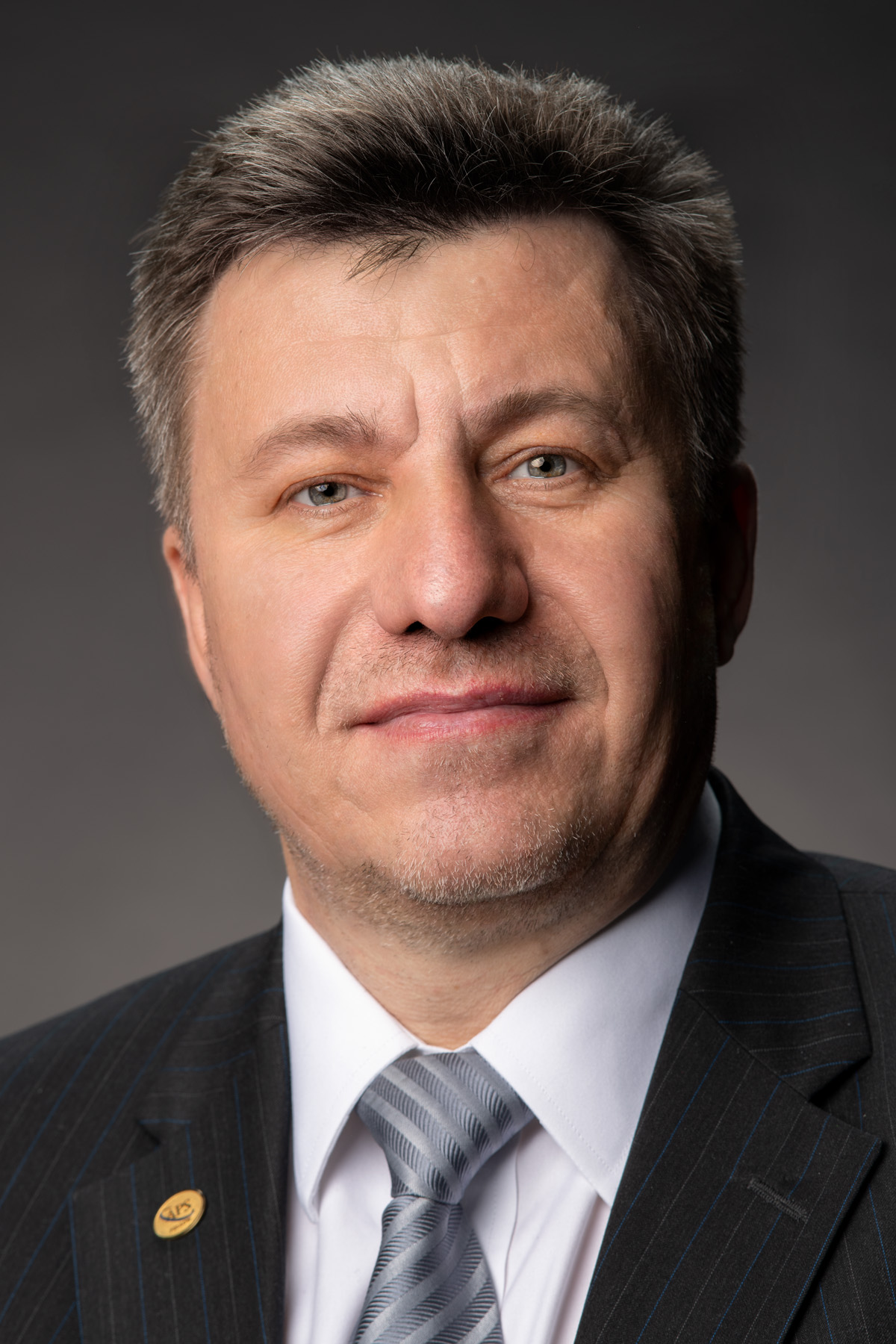
- Born: March 14, 1965 (age 61); Ivanovka, Kirgiz SSR, Soviet Union (now Russian Federation)
- Education: Novosibirsk State University
- Known for: Work on colliders, electron lenses, ATL law
- Awards: Nishikawa Prize (2019); George Gamow Award (2016); Robert H. Siemann Prize (2015); Silver Archer Awards – USA (2013); European Accelerator Prize (2004)
- Scientific career
- Fields: Particle Accelerators; High energy physics
- Workplaces: NIU Fermilab; DESY; Superconducting Super Collider Lab; Institute of Nuclear Physics
- Doctoral advisor: Vasily Parkhomchuk

Vladimir Dmitrievich Shiltsev (Russian: Владимир Дми́триевич Шильцев; born March 14, 1965) is a Russian-American accelerator physicist, professor at NIU, in 1996-2024 - the Distinguished Scientist at Fermi National Accelerator Laboratory. He is best known for his works on particle colliders, invention of electron lenses, leadership in operation of the Tevatron Collider Run II, and numerous contributions to accelerator physics and accelerator technology. Shiltsev led the Tevatron collider department and the Fermilab Accelerator Physics Center from 2001 to 2018 and was chair of the American Physical Society's Division of Physics of Beams in 2018.

== Early life, education and career ==
Shiltsev was born on March 14, 1965, in Ivanovka, Kirgiz SSR, and spent his early years in Osinniki, Russia. After finishing Physics and Math School in Novosibirsk, Russia, he entered the Physics Department of Novosibirsk State University, from which he graduated summa cum laude in 1988. Shiltsev received his PhD and Dr.Sci. (Habilitation) in accelerator and beam physics from the Budker Institute of Nuclear Physics (Novosibirsk, Russia) in 1994 and 2017, respectively, and worked at leading accelerator laboratories in Novosibirsk and Protvino, Russia, the Superconducting Super Collider (SSC) Laboratory in Texas and DESY, before joining Fermilab as a Robert R. Wilson Fellow in 1996. There he initiated and led the project of beam-beam compensation using the Tevatron electron lenses. In 2001 he became Head of the Tevatron Department and one of the leaders of the Collider Run II team at what was then the world's highest-energy particle accelerator. In 2007–2018 he served as the inaugural Director of the Fermilab Accelerator Physics Center. In 2026 he joined Subcritical Systems, Inc. to develop a high-power superconducting proton linear accelerator for the Energy Amplifier — an accelerator-driven subcritical reactor for clean energy generation.

== Research ==
Shiltsev's research interests include modern and future colliders, with significant contributions to beam physics, space-charge and beam-beam effects and their compensation, particle collimation and beam emittance control; design of large hadron colliders, linear ''e+e-'' colliders and muon colliders. He authored five books including ''Electron Lenses for Super-Colliders'' (Springer, 2016 ) and ''Accelerator Physics at the Tevatron Collider'' (Springer, 2014, with V.Lebedev ), and more than 400 publications. Shiltsev is listed among Top-3 Authors in Fundamental Physics after 2010 (for the INSPIRE database, PaperRank=517.1).

His major research accomplishments include the original idea and pioneering development of electron lenses (1997) – now in use for beam-beam compensation, halo collimation, Landau damping and space-charge compensation; pioneering ground motion studies, ATL law of ground diffusion and data analysis worldwide; theory of coherent synchrotron radiation (CSR) effect. Shiltsev was a leading contributor to several accelerator technology records – 31.5 MV/m SRF beam acceleration gradient (ILC specification); 290 T/s HTS SC magnet development; 3 ns 3 MHz HV beam kicker and technology of the first electron lenses, to the Tevatron luminosity progress during its Collider Run II from 10 · 10^{30} cm^{−2}s^{−1} to 430 · 10^{30} cm^{−2}s^{−1}, and to construction and/or commissioning of several new particle accelerators, including the latest 150 MeV/c IOTA ''e/p'' ring for beam physics research (2018).

== Outreach and honors ==
Shiltsev gave many lectures, colloquia and seminars worldwide on the progress and future of modern particle physics, history of particle accelerators, and on Russian polymaths Mikhail Lomonosov (1711-1765) and Dmitry Mendeleev (1834-1907), and wrote dozens of articles in leading peer-reviewed and pop-sci journals, incl. Physics Today, Physics in Perspective, Science First Hands, Journal of Astronomical History and Heritage, Potential, Physics Uspekhi, Nuovo Saggiatore, etc.' Shiltsev is a Member of the European Academy (Academia Europaea) and a Foreign Corresponding Member of the Bologna Academy of Sciences (Accademia delle Scienze dell'Istituto di Bologna). He is Fellow of the Institute of Electrical and Electronics Engineers (IEEE) "for development of electron lenses and contributions to accelerator technology and beam physics", Fellow of the American Association for Advancement of Science (AAAS), Fellow of the American Physical Society (APS). Shiltsev has received the 2019 Nishikawa Accelerator Prize "for outstanding achievements in the field of accelerators" (ACFA / IPAC19), 2016 RASA George Gamow Award, the 2018 American Physical Society Outstanding Referee Award, 2015 Robert H. Siemann Award from the American Physical Society , and the 2004 European Accelerator Prize (EPS) "for many important contributions to accelerator physics which include theory, beam simulations, hardware development, hardware commissioning and beam studies. In particular for his pioneering work on electron-lens beam-beam compensation".
