= Vladimir Sobyanin =

Russian chemist (born 1952)

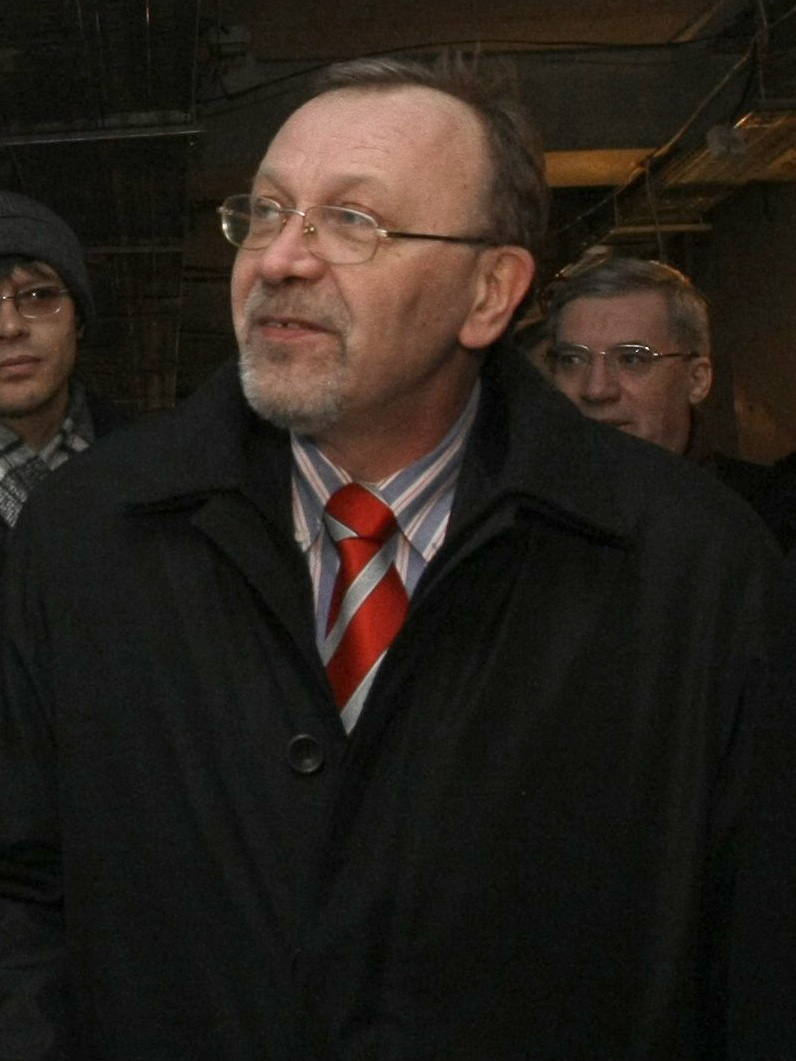
- Born: 13 September 1952 (age 73); Seshcha village, Dubrovsky District, Bryansk Oblast, Soviet Union
- Education: Novosibirsk State University
- Scientific career
- Fields: Chemistry, Natural science

Vladimir Aleksandrovich Sobyanin (Russian: Владимир Александрович Собянин; born 13 September 1952) is a Russian/Soviet scientist, PhD, and professor.

Vladimir Sobyanin was born in 1952. In 1969 he graduated from the Physico Mathematical school of Novosibirsk State University. He graduated from the Department of Natural Sciences of Novosibirsk State University in 1974. In 1991 he obtained his PhD.

Sobyanin's scientific activity is closely connected with the Boreskov Institute of Catalysis of the Russian Academy of Sciences. Since 1974 he has worked there as a research engineer, junior and major research assistant, laboratory chief, and as the deputy director of Scientific Studies.

Sobyanin held several teaching positions at Novosibirsk State University including Professor, Head of the Department of General Chemistry, and, from 2007 to 2012, Rector. Numerous graduation works and Master's theses were defended under his guidance. Sobyanin is a well known scientist in the field of catalysis, is the author of more than 210 scientific works as well as 3 surveys, and holds 14 patents.

Educational offices
Preceded by Nikolay Dikansky	Rector of Novosibirsk State University; 2007–2012	Succeeded by Mikhail Fedoruk
