= Nonna Koperzhynska =

Ukrainian theater and film actress

- Born: Nonna Kronidivna Koperzhynska; 1 May 1920; Kyiv, Ukrainian SSR
- Died: 10 June 1999 (aged 79); Kyiv, Ukraine
- Occupation: Actress
- Years active: 1939–1999

Nonna Kronidivna Koperzhynska (Ukrainian: Нонна Кронідівна Копержинська; 1 May 1920 – 10 June 1999) was a Soviet and Ukrainian stage and film actress, People’s Artist of the Ukrainian SSR (1967). Winner of the Kyiv Pectoral Theater Award (1995).

== Early life and education ==
Nonna Koperzhynska was born on 1 May 1920 in Kyiv. When she was 2 years old, her father died. Then Koperzhynska moved to Donbas where her mother worked until 1937. Later her mother was transferred to work in Kyiv and they moved back there.

In 1938, Koperzhynska entered the Kyiv Theater Institute where she took courses with Amvrosy Buchma. Soon her talent was noticed by Ukrainian director Oleksandr Dovzhenko and Koperzhynska made her film debut in film Shchors directed by Dovzhenko.

In 1941, Koperzhynska had to interrupt her studies because the World War II began. After the war she returned the Kyiv Theater Institute and in 1945 played a role in Hnat Yura’s play that became her student’s diploma work.

== Career ==
In 1946, Koperzhynska was accepted into the troupe of Ivan Franko Kyiv Academic Ukrainian Drama Theater, where she worked until the end of her life. In 1952 Koperzhynska starred in the film Stolen Happiness. She became recognized by the public after her roles in the films Chasing Two Hares (1961) and Queen of the Gas Station (1963). In 1967, Koperzhynska was awarded the title of People’s Artist of the Ukrainian SSR.

Nonna Koperzhynska died on 10 June 1999 in Kyiv. She is buried in Baikove Cemetery alongside her husband.

== Commemoration ==
A memorial plaque in honor of Nonna Koperzhynska also known as the Mother of the Ukrainian Theater was erected on 9 June 9, 2009 at 2 Mykhailivska Street in Kyiv, where the actress lived since 1981.

In 2019 a book “People's Artist. About Nonna Koperzhynska” by Oleg Vergelis was published.

== Filmography (selected) ==
- Shchors (1939)
- Stolen Happiness (1952)
- Marina's Destiny (1953)
- Chasing Two Hares (1961)
- Queen of the Gas Station (1963)
- Rome, 17 (1972)
- Love Island (1995)
