= Aquifer properties =

The aquifer properties of the aquifer essentially depend upon the composition of the aquifer. The most important properties of the aquifer are porosity and specific yield which in turn give its capacity to release the water in the pores and its ability to transmit the flow with ease.

== Porosity ==
In soil mechanics and hydrology, porosity is defined as the ratio of volume of voids to the total volume of porous medium. Mathematically it can be represented by the equation expressed as

$$n = \frac{V_V}{V_T} = \frac{V_V}{V_S + V_V} = \frac{e}{1 + e}$$

where $e$ is void ratio, $n$ is porosity, V_{V} is the volume of void-space (air and water), V_{S} is the volume of solids, and V_{T} is the total or bulk volume of medium. The significance of the porosity is that it gives the idea of water storage capacity of the aquifer. Qualitatively, porosity less than 5% is considered to be small, between 5 and 20% as medium and the percentage exceeding 20% is considered as large.

== Specific yield ==
Porosity gives a measure of the water storage capability of soil but not all the water present in the soil pores is available for extraction by pumping for the use of humans or draining by gravity. The pores in the soil hold back sufficient quantity of water on account of forces like surface tension and molecular attraction. Hence the actual amount of water that can be extracted from the unit volume of aquifer by pumping or under the action of gravity is called as specific yield. The fraction of water held back in the aquifer is known as specific retention. Thus it can be said that porosity is the sum of specific yield and specific retention. Specific yield of soils differ from each other in the sense that some soil types have strong molecular attraction with the water held in their pores while others have less. It is found experimentally that cohesionless soils have high specific yield than cohesive soils because the former has significantly less molecular attraction then the latter. Coarse-grained soils or rocks such as coarse sandstone can have specific yields that are closer to their actual porosity in the range 20 to 35%. The case of fine grained materials is quite opposite to that range.

=== Porosity and Specific Yield of Soil Formation ===
Formation	Porosity%	Specific yield%
Clay	45-55	1-10
Sand	35-40	10-30
Gravel	30-40	15-30
Sandstone	10-30	5-15
Shale	1-10	0.5-5
Limestone	1-10	0.5-5

In the table above, sand and gravel though having less porosity than clay yield much more than clay because of relatively less molecular attraction and coarse size of particles.
