= Vyatka State University =

University in Kirov, Russia

- Вятский государственный университет
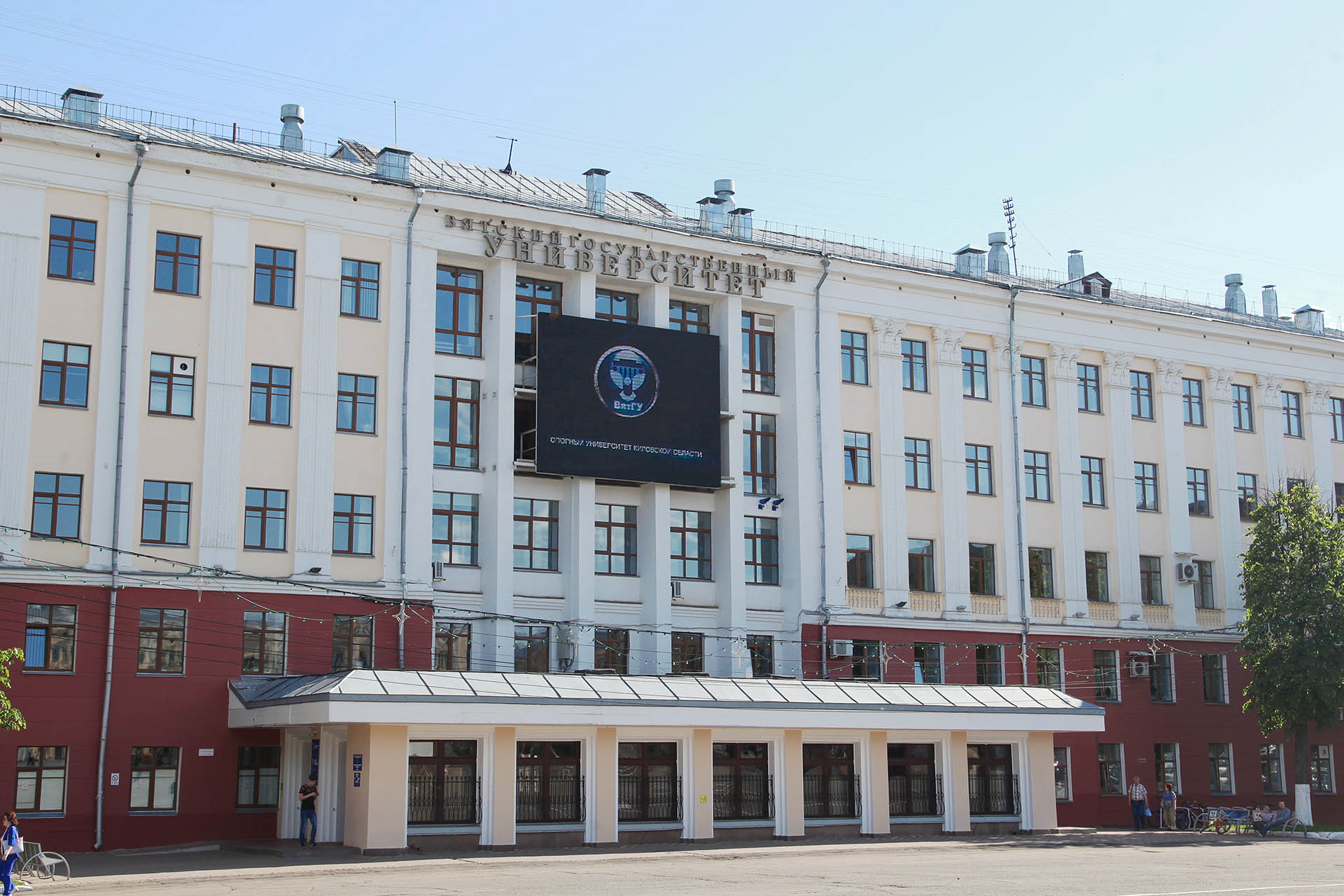
- Type: Public
- Established: 1914 (2016 in current form)
- Location: Kirov, Russia; 58.602585°N 49.666403°E
- Campus: Urban
- Nickname: VyaGU (Russian: ВятГУ)
- Website: www.vyatsu.ru
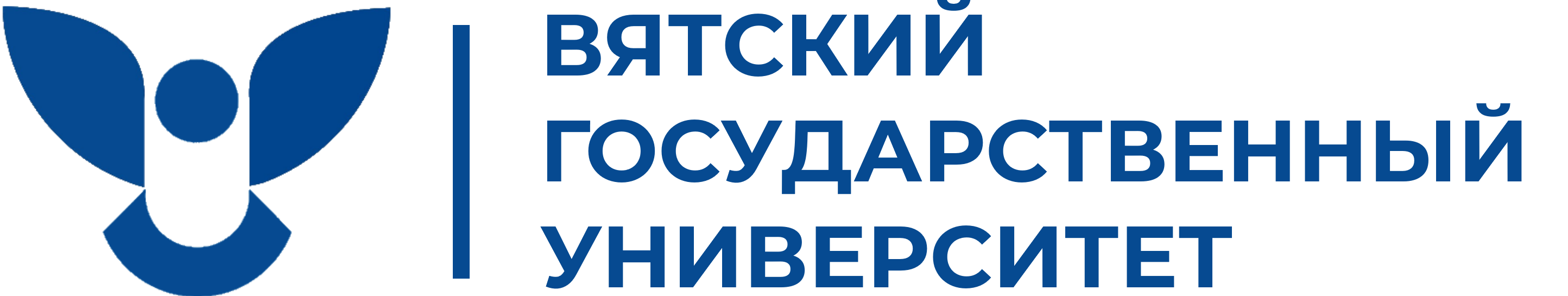

Vyatka State University (VyaGU; Russian: Федеральное государственное бюджетное образовательное учреждение высшего образования «Вятский государственный университет» (ВятГУ)) is a public university in Kirov, the capital city of Kirov Oblast in Russia. It was created in its current form in 2016 with the merger of the Vyatka State Humanitarian University and the Vyatka State Technological University.

Yungblud Valeriy (Юнгблюд Валерий Теодорович]), the rector of the Vyatka State University has signed a letter of support for the Russian invasion of Ukraine.

== History ==
The modern university traces its history to two different organizations.

=== Vyatka State Humanitarian University ===
On July 1, 1914, the Vyatka Teachers' Institute began operating. It was opened in July 1914 for the training of teachers of higher primary schools on the basis of the Regulations approved by the provincial zemstvo government on June 25, 1912. In 1917, specialization was introduced, 3 departments were established: verbal-historical, physical-mathematical, natural-geographical. In 1918, the Vyatka Teachers' Institute was transformed into a higher educational institution, the Pedagogical Institute. In 1924, the institute has moved to a classical building in 11 Lenina Street. In 1934, the number of faculties at the institute expanded significantly: history, physics and mathematics, Russian language and literature, natural science, and geography faculties were formed. In connection with the renaming of the city from Vyatka to Kirov, the institute changed its name from Vyatsky to Kirovsky. In 1995 the Kirov State Pedagogical Institute was awarded the status of a university. In accordance with order No. 2199 of the Ministry of Education of the Russian Federation dated June 11, 2002, Vyatka State Pedagogical University was renamed Vyatka State Humanitarian University.

=== Vyatka State Technological University ===
Separately, in March 1963, the independent Kirov Correspondence Polytechnic Institute was founded and in 1968 it was transformed into the Kirov Politechnical Institute and in 1994 Vyatka State Technological University. The structure of the newborn institute included four faculties: electrical engineering, electrical physics, mechanical engineering and civil engineering, general technical.

In 2015 the university applied to participate in the program for the formation of flagship universities.

=== Vyatka State University ===
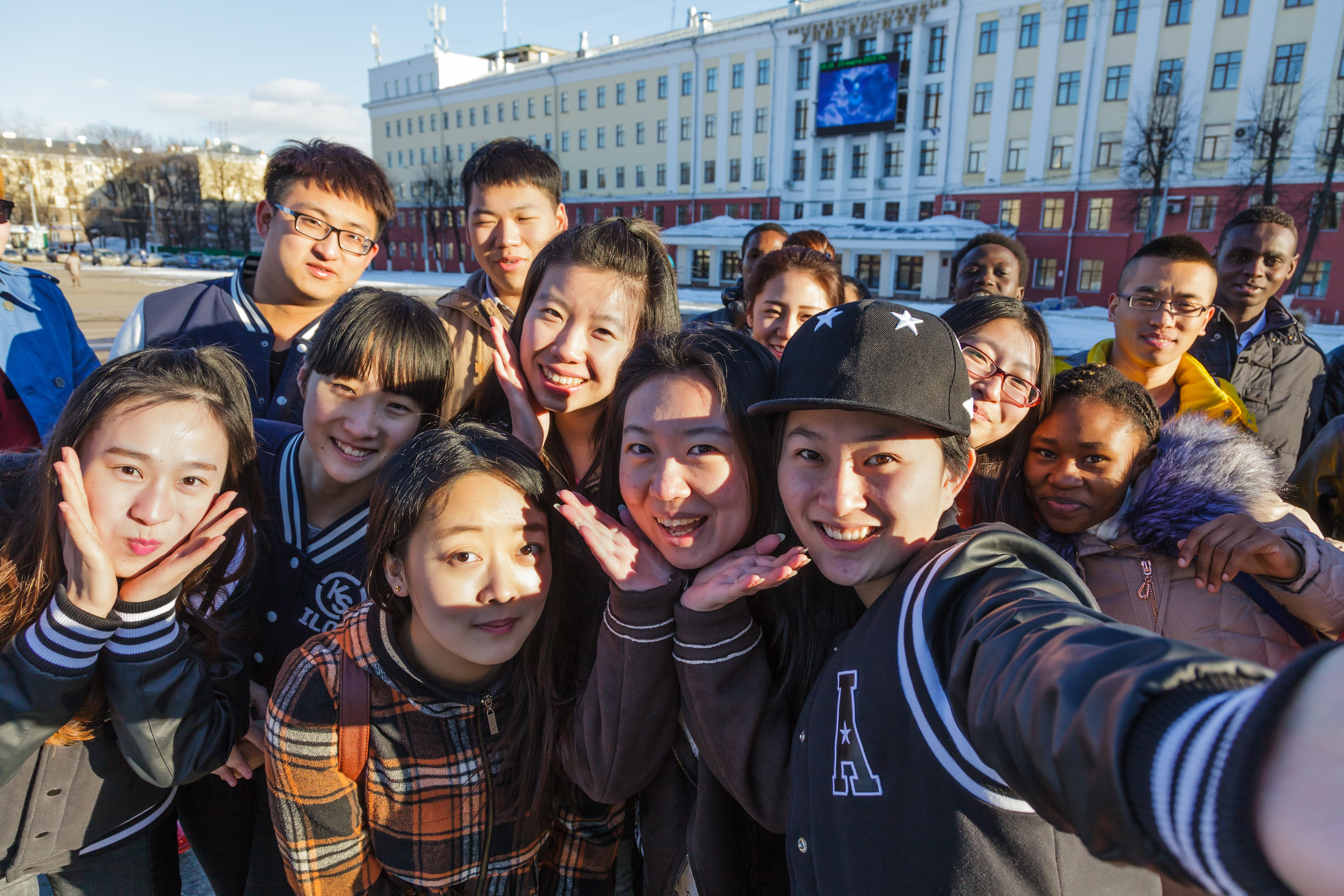
International students of Vyatka University

As part of the flagship universities program, the merger of Vyatka State Humanitarian University and Vyatka State Technological University have merged into one university bearing the name Vyatka State University.

In 2016, Vyatka State University was awarded the title of flagship university. Since 2021 the university has been a participant in "Priority 2030" program which provides the state support and development for universities.

In 2020, researchers at Vyatka State University (in collaboration with the Center for Collective Use which enables them to use SKIF Cyberia Supercomputer) performed a study in which PolyAnalyst was used to identify and reach out to victims of domestic violence through social media analysis. The researchers scraped the web for messages containing descriptions of abuse, and then classified the type of abuse as physical, psychological, economic, or sexual. They also constructed a chatbot to contact the identified victims of abuse and to refer them to specialists based on the type of abuse described in their messages. The data collected in this study was used to create the first ever Russian-language corpus on domestic violence.

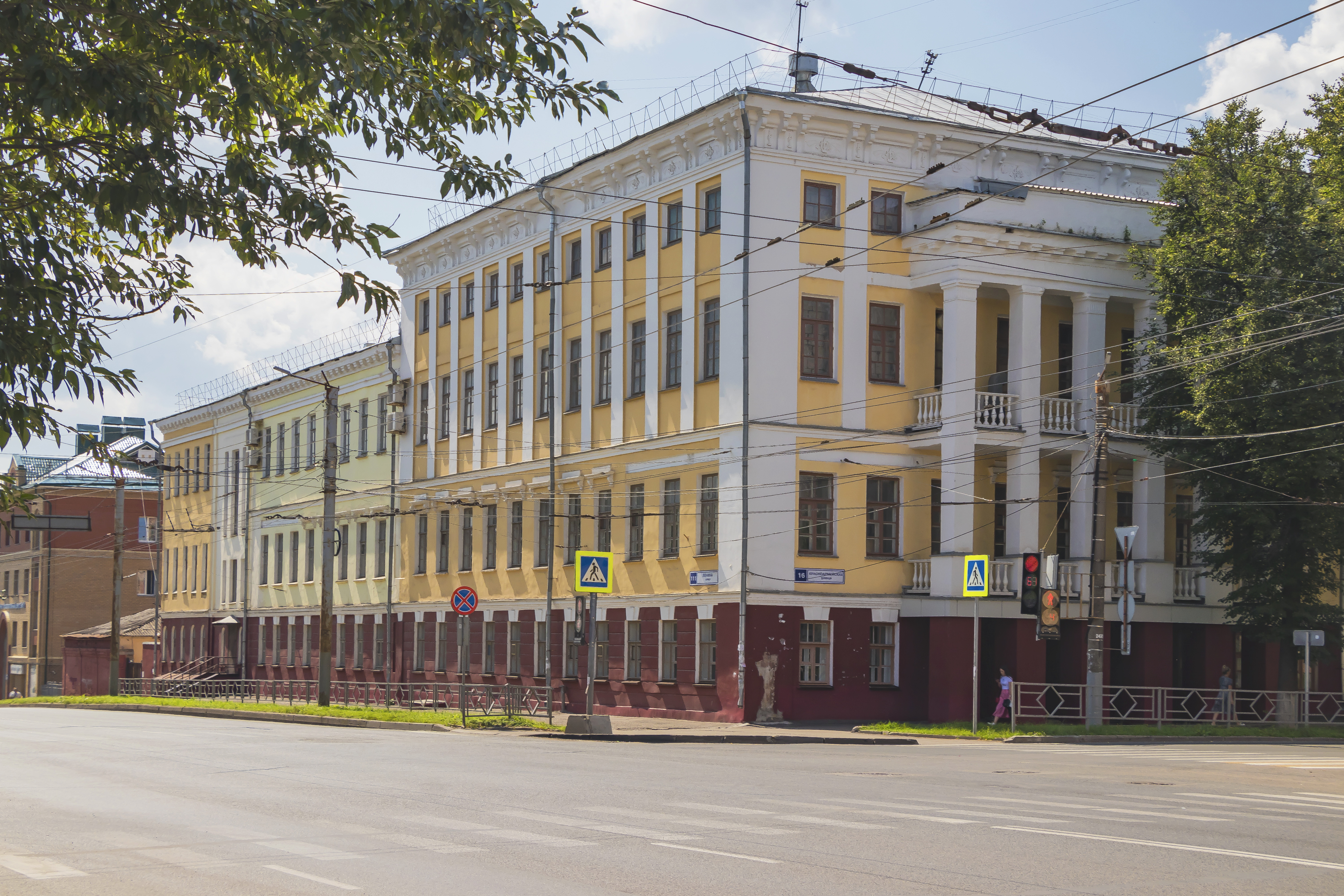
Building on Lenina street

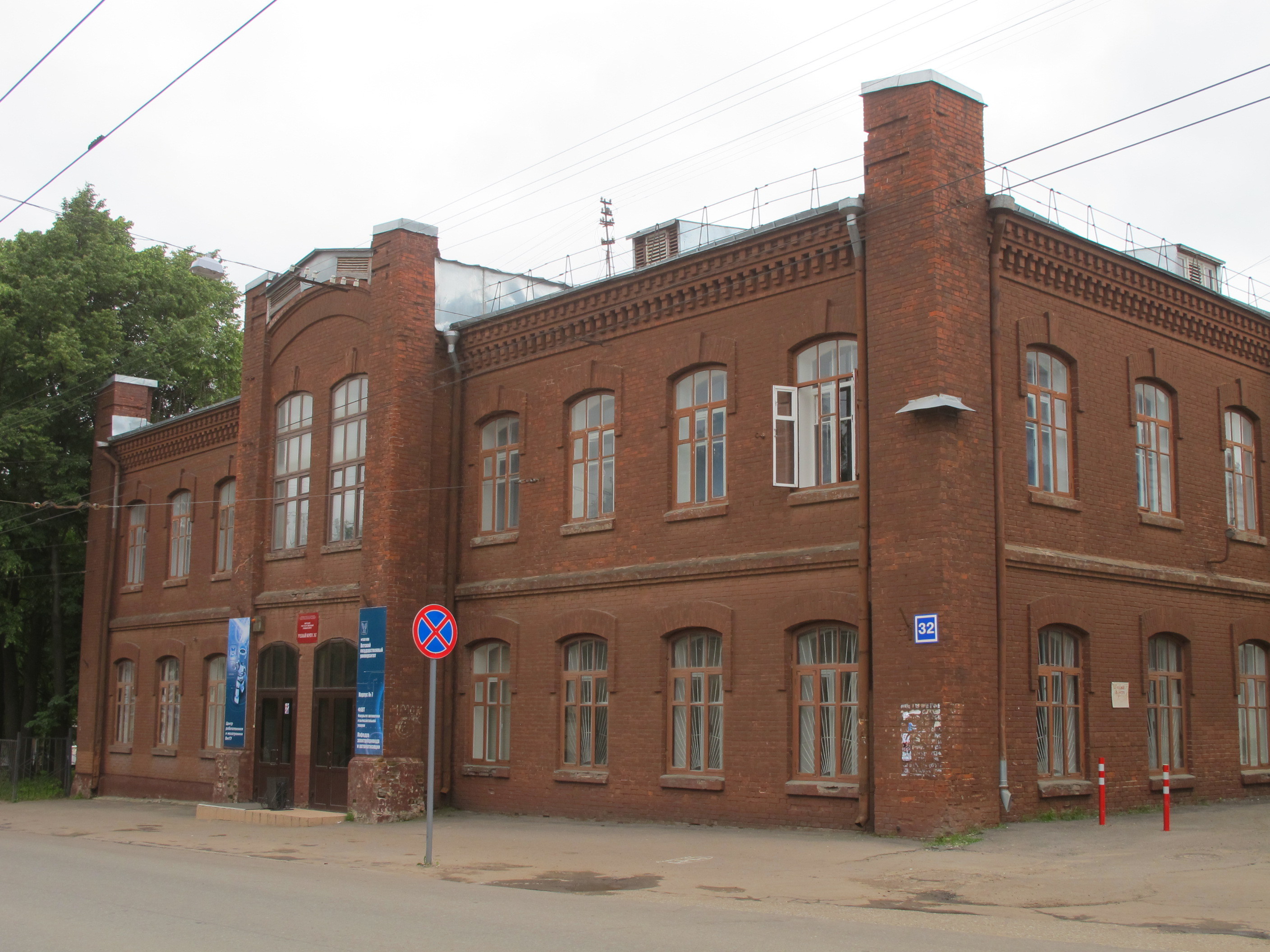
Building on Preobrazhenskaya street

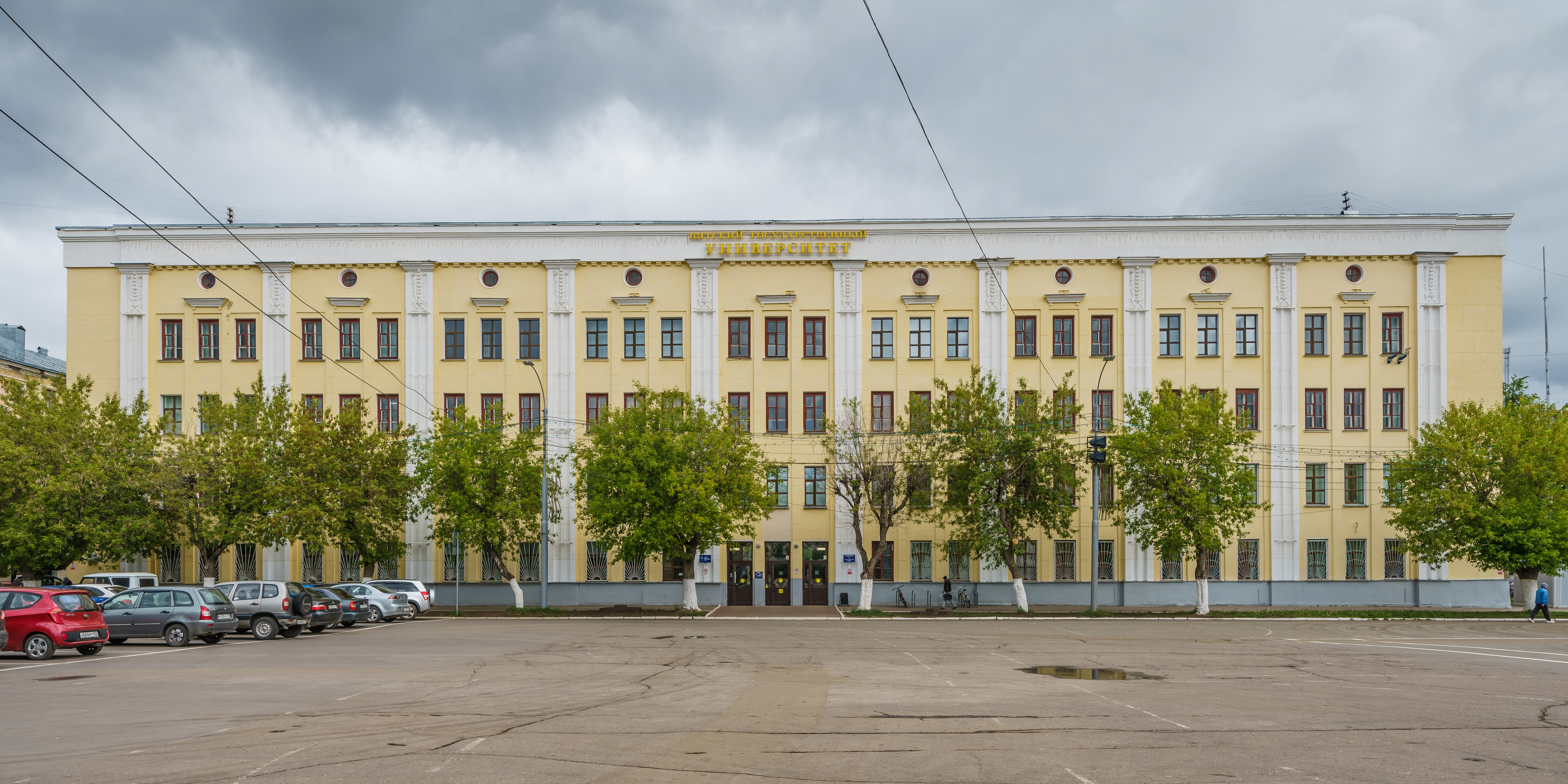
Building on Teatral'naya square
