= Voevodsky Institute of Chemical Kinetics and Combustion =

Research institute in Novosibirsk, Russia

Coordinates: 54.8451°N 83.1168°E

V. V. Voevodsky Institute of Chemical Kinetics and Combustion of the Siberian Branch of the RAS
- Established: 1957
- Director: Andrei Onishchuk
- Owner: Siberian Branch of RAS
- Address: Institutskaya Street 3, Novosibirsk, 630090, Russia
- Location: Novosibirsk, Russia
- Website: www.kinetics.nsc.ru

V. V. Voevodsky Institute of Chemical Kinetics and Combustion of the Siberian Branch of the RAS, ICKC SB RAS (Russian: Институт химической кинетики и горения имени В. В. Воеводского Сибирского отделения Российской академии наук, ИХКГ СО РАН) is a research institute in Novosibirsk, Russia. It was founded in 1957.

== History ==
The institute was founded in 1957. Its team was formed of scientists led by A. A. Kovalsky and V. V. Voevodsky. In 2002, the number of employees was 284.

== Activities ==
The study of combustion mechanisms in gas and condensed phases, the processes of formation and distribution of aerosols etc. The institute has developed methods for high-resolution radiospectroscopy and methods for the filtration combustion of gases. It created aerosol technologies for the protection of crops and forests.

== Awards ==
The works of the institute staff were awarded the USSR Council of Ministers Prize (1985), the Lenin Prize (1986), two USSR State Prizes (1968, 1988) and the State Prize of the Russian Federation (1994).
