= Alexander Nesmeyanov =

Soviet chemist and academician

- Александр Несмеянов
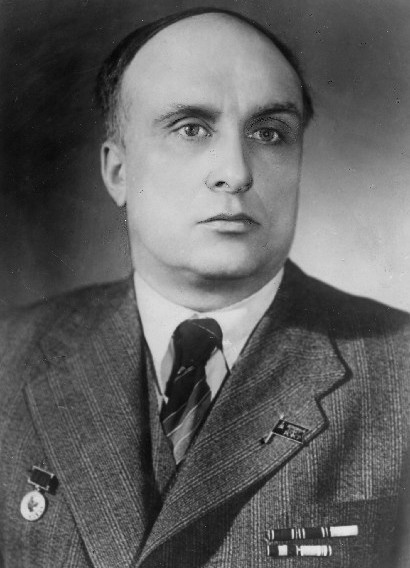
- Nesmeyanov in 1950
- Born: 9 September [O.S. 28 August] 1899; Moscow, Russian Empire
- Died: 17 January 1980 (aged 80); Moscow, Soviet Union
- Awards: Lomonosov Gold Medal (1962)

Signature
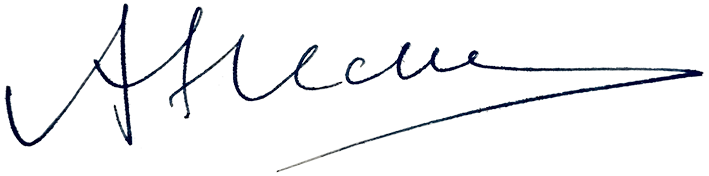

Alexander Nikolayevich Nesmeyanov ForMemRS (Russian: Александр Николаевич Несмеянов; 9 September [O.S. 28 August] 1899 – 17 January 1980) was a Soviet chemist and academician (1943) specializing in organometallic chemistry.

== Biography ==
He was born in Moscow. He had two brothers Vasily (1904) and Andrei (1911) and a sister Tatyana (1908) (two born sisters died in infancy). His father (Nikolai Vasilyevich Nesmeyanov), graduated with excellence Vladimir Gymnasium, and then the Faculty of Law of Moscow University. He became interested in enlightenment and was working as a public teacher in the village of Bushov (Tula province) for 10 years. He had married in 1898 and worked at the Moscow city government, then he was a director Bakhrushinsky orphanage in Moscow (1901 – 1917). Alexander's mother, Lyudmila Danilovna (1878 – 1958), was a multi-talented teacher. At ten years Alexander became a vegetarian, and in 1913 he stopped eating fish. It was not easy to follow this conviction, especially in the famine years of 1918 – 1921, when roach and herring were an essential food product. He had become interested in various branches of biology: entomology, hydrobiology, ornithology and from the age of thirteen became interested in chemistry.

=== Education ===
In 1909, parents sent Alexander to P. N. Strakhov's private Moscow gymnasium, which he graduated with honors. In 1917, he entered the natural department of the Faculty of Physics and Mathematics at Moscow University. There were no entrance exams due to the passage of the revolution. Studying in this difficult time required great self-sacrifice and fanatical dedication. They studied in unheated rooms and there was not enough laboratory equipment. Transport was bad, and sometimes Alexander had to walk on foot to the university from Sokolniki. In 1920, classes at Moscow State University were frozen due to problems with heating, and Nesmeyanov entered the Military Pedagogical Academy on Bolshaya Gruzinskaya Street. At the same time, he worked in the laboratories of the Shanyavsky Moscow City People's University. By the end of 1920, Alexander Nikolayevich returned to studies at the academy and at Moscow University, where heating had already been restored. He meets the "future scientific mentor", Professor N. D. Zelinsky. While he was working as a night watchman at the faculty, Nesmeyanov lived in the laboratory of N. D. Zelinsky and devoting all his time to scientific experiments.

=== After university ===
After graduating from the university (1922), Nesmeyanov remained at the department of Academician N. D. Zelinsky. He held the positions of assistant (1924–1938), associate professor, professor (since 1935). He headed the Department of Organic Chemistry at the Institute of Fine Chemical Technology since 1938. From 1939 to 1954 Nesmeyanov was director of the Institute of Organic Chemistry of the Academy of Sciences of the Soviet Union. In 1939 he was elected as a corresponding member of Academy of Sciences of the Soviet Union, and in 1943 - an academician of Academy of Sciences of the Soviet Union. In 1946 - 1951 he was an Academician-Secretary of the Department of Chemical Sciences of Academy of Sciences of the Soviet Union. Member of the VK P (b) since 1944. At the end of the Great Patriotic War, Alexander Nikolayevich returned to his native university. He headed the Department of Organic Chemistry (1944 – 1958), he was the dean of the Faculty of Chemistry (1944 – 1948), and then became the rector of Moscow State University(1948 – 1951). Thanks to Nesmeyanov's research in the field of organometallic compounds during the war and post-war years, a number of important results were obtained that are of great theoretical and practical importance. These studies were aimed at developing methods for the synthesis and studying the chemical properties of various representatives of an important and extensive class of compounds located at the junction of inorganic and organic chemistry. During the period of Nesmeyanov's rectorship, the construction of a large complex of university buildings on the Sparrow (Lenin) Hills began. Under his leadership, competent commissions were created to develop technical specifications for the placement of university units in a new location. They worked in close creative contact with the author's group of architects (full members of the Academy of Architecture of the USSR L. V. Rudnev, S. E. Chernyshev, architects A. F. Khryakov, P. V. Abrosimov), with builders (A. N. Komarovsky, A. V. Voronkov). Simultaneously with the colossal construction, the development of the university structure is taking place, and curricula are being improved. Thus, courses on the history of sciences were introduced into the curricula of the natural faculties. In 1948, the Faculty of Biology was reorganized into the Faculty of Biology and Soil.

In 1949 construction began on an agrobiological station in Chashnikovo. At the same time, the Faculty of Geology was created and the departments were organized: crystallography and crystal chemistry; history of geological sciences. In 1950, assistance was provided to the University of Chisinau with literature and equipment.

In 1951, after the death of the President of the Academy of Sciences of the USSR, S. I. Vavilov Nesmeyanov was summoned to a member of the Politburo of the Central Committee, G. M. Malenkov, who offered to take the vacant post:

I replied that such an honor was not to be refused, but felt it necessary to state what might prevent me from accepting such an honorable duty: I began with my vegetarian beliefs, saying that these beliefs had nothing to do with Tolstoyism. Further, I said that in 1940 my brother was arrested, and his fate is still unknown to me. Finally, he recalled that the tradition is such that the president of the Academy of Sciences has so far been non-partisan, and that this is hardly an accident, and I am a member of the party ... And one of the arguments did not make the slightest impression on Malenkov. The conversation showed me clearly that the matter was settled.

— A. N. Nesmeyanov

On February 16, 1951, at an extraordinary session of the general meeting of the Academy of Sciences, Nesmeyanov was elected its president. In 1952, he founded the Institute for Scientific Information. In 1954, he opened the Institute of Organoelement Compounds of the Academy of Sciences of the USSR, which he led until his death (at present, the institute bears the name of A.N. Nesmeyanov). On May 19, 1961, Nesmeyanov resigned as president of the Academy of Sciences of the Soviet Union of his own free will. In May 1969, at a meeting of the Academic Council of the Institute of Organoelement Compounds, Nesmeyanov spoke out against being elected a senior researcher Candidate of Chemical Sciences Rokhlin, stating “I am a vindictive person. Last year, Rokhlin was among those who, at an institute rally, spoke out against the introduction of Soviet troops into Czechoslovakia. This speech did not affect the results of the vote, and Rokhlin was elected a senior researcher. Deputy of the Supreme Soviet of the USSR 3-5 convocations (1950 – 1962). He was one of the academicians of the Academy of Sciences of the USSR, who in 1973 signed a letter from scientists to the Pravda newspaper condemning "the behavior of Academician A. D. Sakharov ". In the letter, Sakharov was accused of having "made a number of statements discrediting the state system, the foreign and domestic policy of the Soviet Union", and academicians assessed his human rights activities as "defaming the honor and dignity of the Soviet scientist". He was interested in literature and painting, wrote poetry, sketches, was an avid mushroom picker. Died January 17, 1980. He was buried in Moscow at the Novodevichy Cemetery.

=== Family ===
He has been married twice. The first wife – Nina Vladimirovna Koperina (1900–1986) – is a chemist, she has worked at Moscow State University. Children from the first marriage: Olga (1930–2014) – candidate of chemical sciences; Nikolai (1932–1992) – Doctor of Chemical Sciences, Professor я. The second wife – Vinogradova Marina Anatolyevna (1921–2013) – is a philologist and a writer. Nesmeyanov had two brothers and a sister: Andrey Nesmeyanov (1911–1983) – radiochemist, head of the radiochemistry department of Moscow State University, professor, corresponding member of the Academy of Sciences of the Soviet Union. Vasily Nesmeyanov (1904–1941) – worked as deputy head of the Topographic and Geodetic Service of the Main Directorate of Geodesy and Cartography under the Council of People's Commissars of the USSR. He was shot on July 28, 1941 on charges of espionage. He was rehabilitated on September 17, 1955 by the decision of the Military Collegium of the Supreme Court of the USSR. Tatyana Nesmeyanova (1908–1991).

== Scientific activity ==
Alexander Nikolayevich was one of the greatest organic chemists of the 20th century. He organised a number of fundamental works on the theory of the structure and reactivity of organic compounds. He created a new discipline lying on the border of inorganic and organic chemistry, which was called "chemistry of organoelement compounds". Also he has researched the production of synthetic food, the creation of new drugs and the synthesis of a number of technical materials.

=== Nesmeyanov's diazomethod (Nesmeyanov's reaction) ===
Studying the decomposition of double salts of aryldiazonium halides with mercury halides by copper powder, in 1929 Nesmeyanov proposed a new method for obtaining arylmercury halides. Later, the diazo method was extended to the synthesis of organometallic compounds of thallium, germanium, tin, lead, arsenic, antimony, and bismuth. The features of the diazo method, which distinguish it from direct metalation methods, are the possibility of obtaining organometallic compounds with different functional groups in the carbon radical and the possibility of selectively introducing a metal atom into a certain position. In 1935 – 1948, Nesmeyanov, together with K. A. Kocheshkov, obtained organic derivatives of tin, lead, antimony and other metals. Due to mutual transitions from organic derivatives of some elements to organic compounds of other elements, organometallic compounds obtained by the diazo method have found new applications in synthesis.

=== Stereochemistry of unsaturated organometallic compounds ===
The study by Nesmeyanov of the products of the addition of mercuric chloride to ethylene, acetylene and their derivatives led to the concept of the “dual reactivity” of a substance and the “transfer of the reaction center” along the chain π, π-, σ, π-, σ, σ- and p,π-conjugations in a molecule. Further research showed that these phenomena are fundamentally different from tautomerism. With the participation of his colleague A.E. Borisov, Nesmeyanov formulated the rule according to which electrophilic and homolytic substitution at the olefin carbon atom occurs with the preservation of the geometric configuration (Nesmeyanov – Borisov rule). Thanks to his research, which showed the enolate structure of ketone derivatives with alkali metals and magnesium, that is, the existence of O-derivatives of ketones, Nesmeyanov refuted Knorr 's concept of "pseudomerism ".

=== Metallotropy ===
In the study of the structure of mercury b-, lead- and organotin derivatives of nitrosophenols, Nesmeyanov discovered the phenomenon of metallotropy, that is, a special tautomerism in which a reversible transfer of an organometallic group occurs. Joint studies by A. N. Nesmeyanov and I. F. Lutsenko discovered heteroatomic tautomerism (between carbon and oxygen atoms) in keto-enol systems of tin, o- and germanium compounds. Nesmeyanov, together with Yu. A. and N. A. Ustynyuk, discovered a new type of metallotropy: it was found that in fluorenylchromium tricarbonyl anions, η 6 -complexes are equilibrium and reversibly isomerized into η 5 -complexes.

=== Research on ferrocene and its derivatives ===
In 1954, research into the chemistry of ferrocene began at the Department of Organic Chemistry at Moscow State University and at INEOS under the direction of Nesmeyanov. It turned out that the functional derivatives of ferrocene react similarly to aromatic compounds. However, it has been shown that the electronic effects of the substituents are transmitted through the metallocene core by an inductive mechanism, and therefore have a lesser effect than on benzene derivatives. Research on ferrocene and its derivatives made it possible to create a number of photosensitive compositions that allow obtaining a stable image on paper, fabric, plastics and metals, and also led to the creation of a new drug, ferrocerone, which fights diseases associated with iron deficiency. On the basis of cymantrene, Nesmeyanov proposed a new antiknock agent for motor gasoline.

=== Research in organic chemistry ===
Nesmeyanov, together with N.K. Kochetkov and M.I. Rybinskaya, developed a method for the synthesis of various five- and six-membered heterocycles, which is based on the high activity of carbonyl groups and the mobility of the β-substituent in compounds of the type RCOCH=CHX. The same group of scientists developed the method of "β-ketovinylation", which consists in introducing an RCOCH=CH group into the molecule. The reaction of β-substituted vinyl ketones with an azide ion made it possible to study the stereochemistry and propose a mechanism for nucleophilic substitution at the activated double bond.

In collaboration with other scientists, Nesmeyanov carried out a number of works in the field of radical telomerization and rearrangement radicals. In addition to studies of already known reactions, thermal telomerization of ethylene and propylene with silicon hydrides has been developed and other new telomerization reactions. Also, new routes for the synthesis of compounds containing groups such as CCl_{3}, CCl_{3}CHCl, CCl_{3}C<, CCl_{2}=CH, CCl_{2}=CHX and others. The study of compounds containing the CCl_{3}-C=C< group showed the rearrangement during reactions with attack on the terminal atoms of the system, which confirmed the presence of σ,π-conjugation. Nesmeyanov together with R. H. Freidlina and V. N. Kost discovered the chain radical isomerization of CCl_{3}CBr=CH_{2} to CCl_{2}=CClCH_{2}Br under ultraviolet illumination.

In continuation of the work related to the previously created diazo method, Nesmeyanov and L. G. Makarova investigated the mechanism of decomposition of aryldiazonium and diaryliodonium salts. This made it possible to synthesize new types of onium compounds - diphenylbromonium, diphenylchloronium and triphenyloxonium salts. Together with T. P. Tolstaya and other scientists, Nesmeyanov showed that double salts of diphenylbromonium and diphenylchloronium halides with heavy metal halides are decomposed by powders of the corresponding metals with the formation of organometallic compounds. Thus, the diazo method began to be used to obtain σ-aryl complexes of transition metals and other organometallic compounds.

=== The scientific basis for obtaining new forms of food ===
In 1961, Nesmeyanov formulated the idea of obtaining food by synthetic methods, bypassing agriculture. The idea was based on the works of D. I. Mendeleev and M. Berthelot, as well as an awareness of the modern possibilities of organic synthesis, the problems of preserving the environment and the efficiency of food production. The main areas of work were: the development of highly efficient methods for obtaining nutrients; reproduction of the appearance, taste, smell, color, shape, consistency and other properties of natural products in synthetic food substances. As a result of research at INEOS, processes have been developed for obtaining black caviar, new forms of potato products, pasta and cereals and combined meat products based on vegetable and animal proteins.

== Recognition ==
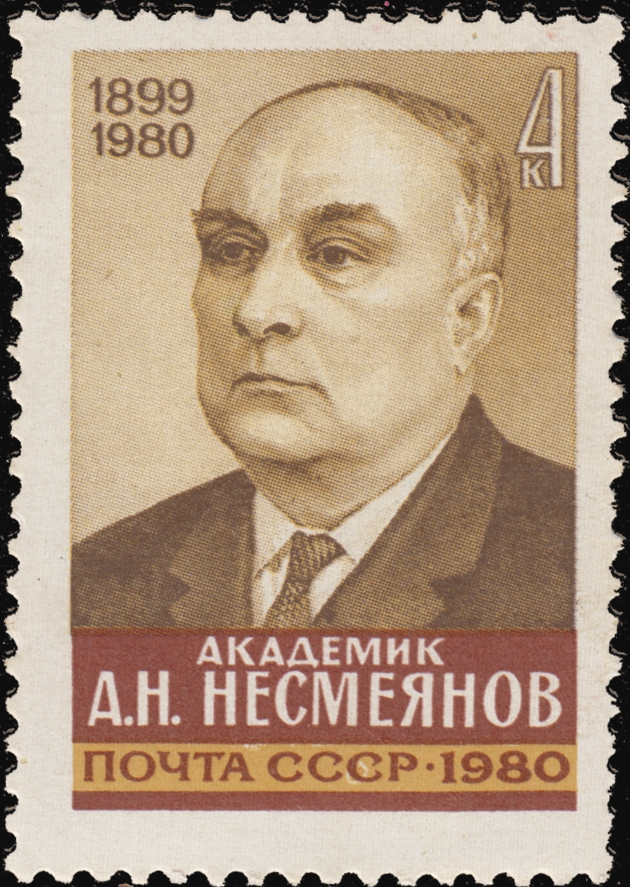
Image of Alexander Nesmeyanov on a 1980 Soviet stamp

Alexander Nikolayevich's work on the chemistry of organoelement compounds brought him fame and recognition not only in the Soviet Union, but also in the world. He was elected an honorary member of several dozen foreign national academies and scientific societies.

=== Awards and prizes ===
- Stalin Prize first degree (1943) - for research in the field of organometallic compounds, the results of which were published in 1941 and 1942 in a series of articles: “On the interaction of diazoacetic ether with tin chloride and ferric chloride”, “From the field of organomercuric compounds ”, “On the reaction of nitroso compounds with nitric oxide” and in the monograph “Synthetic methods in the field of organometallic compounds of mercury” (1942)
- Lenin Prize (1966) - for a cycle of research in the field of organoelement compounds
- Twice Hero of Socialist Labour (1969, 1979)
- Gold medal named after D. I. Mendeleev (1977) - for a series of works in the field of organometallic compounds and obtaining food from non-traditional sources
- V Mendeleev Reader
- Large Gold Medal named after M. V. Lomonosov Academy of Sciences of the Soviet Union (1962)
- Seven Orders of Lenin (11/04/1944; 06/10/1945; 09/19/1953; 09/08/1959; 04/27/1967; 03/13/1969; 09/07/1979)
- Order of the October Revolution (09/13/1974)
- Order of the Red Banner of Labour (09/14/1949)
- Silver medal of the World Peace Council (1959)

=== Academies and societies ===
- Honorary Member of the Academy of Sciences of the Armenian SSR
- Honorary Member of Academy of Sciences of the Tajik SSR
- Honorary member of Academy of Sciences of the Turkmen SSR
- Honorary Member of Bulgarian Academy of Sciences (1952)
- Honorary Member of Hungarian Academy of Sciences (1953)
- Honorary Member of the Romanian Academy of Sciences (1957)
- Honorary Member of New York Academy of Sciences USA (1958)
- Honorary Member of American Academy of Arts and Sciences in Boston (1960)
- Honorary Member of the London Chemical Society
- Honorary Member of the Chemical Industry Society of Great Britain
- Honorary Member of the Polish Chemical Society
- Honorary Member of National Institute of Sciences of India
- Honorary Member of the Royal Society of Edinburgh
- Full member of German Academy of Naturalists "Leopoldina" (1959)
- Full member of International Academy of Astronautics (1966)
- Member of the Polish Academy of Sciences (1954)
- Full member of Czechoslovak Academy of Sciences (1957)
- Foreign Member Royal Society of London (1961)
- Foreign member GDR Academy of Sciences (1950)
- Member of the European Society of Cultural Workers
- Doctor "honoris causa" University of Paris (1964)
- Doctor "honoris causa" University of Bordeaux (1966)
- Doctor "honoris causa" University of Jena
- Doctor "honoris causa" University of Calcutta
- Doctor Iasi Polytechnic Institute
- Member of World Peace Council (1950)

=== Memory ===
- Institute of Organoelement Compounds. A. N. Nesmeyanov RAS. In front of Institute building a memorial bust was installed (sculptor Oleg Komov). At the Institute of the annual annual day of memory of A. N. Nesmeyanov with relatives and graduate students.
- On September 26, 1980, one of the streets of the Gagarinsky district of Moscow was named after Alexander Nikolayevich.
- Russian Academy of Sciences was founder Prize named after A.N. Nesmeyanov, awarded since 1994 for outstanding work in the field of chemistry of organoelement compounds.
- In December 1980, a stamp in memory of A. N. Nesmeyanov was issued in the USSR.
- Alexander Petrovich Kazantsev dedicated to him the novel The Dome of Hope felt the phrase: “To the vivid memory of America, the Hero of Socialist Labor, Academician Alexander Nikolayevich NESMEYANOV, as a token of admiration for his life and work, I dedicate this novel-dream. Author».
- In 1981, a memorial plaque with his name was unveiled at Chemical Faculty of Moscow State University.
- The name of Academician Nesmeyanov was carried by the research ship of the Vityaz type in 1980-2009.

Striving for the future, one must always remember, love and revere everything that is at its best.

— A. N. Nesmeyanov

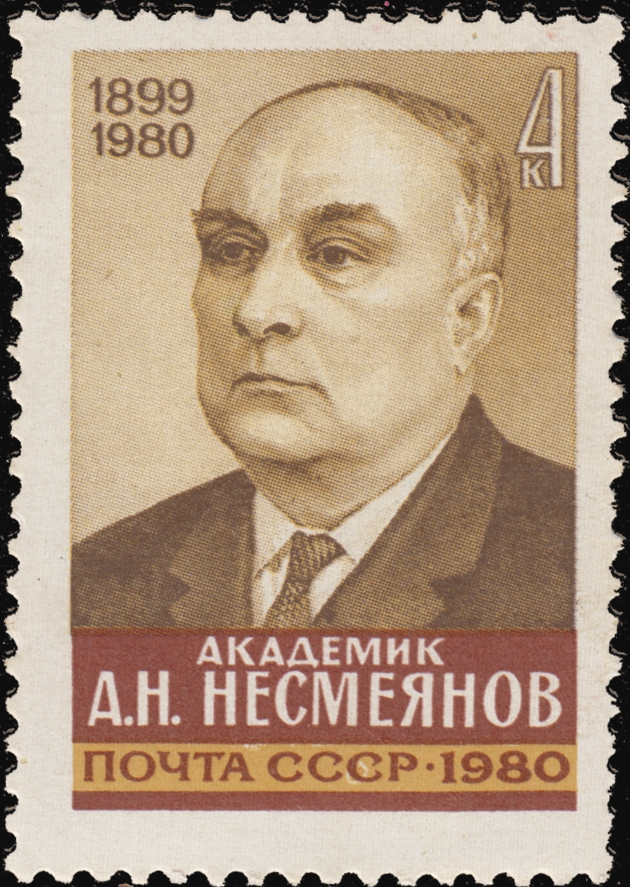
USSR postage stamp (1980)

== Main works ==
- Nesmeyanov A.N. D.I. Mendeleev's Periodic Table of Elements and Organic Chemistry. Series: Reports at the plenary session/ VIII Mendeleev Congress on General and Applied Chemistry. Moscow: Publishing House Acad. Sciences of the USSR, 1959.
- Nesmeyanov A.N. Ed. acad. A. V. Topchiev Selected Works. Moscow: Publishing House Acad. Sciences of the USSR, 1959.
- Ioffe S.T. and Nesmeyanov A.N. Ed. A. N. Nesmeyanova and К. A. Kocheshkova Magnesium, beryllium, calcium, strontium, barium. Series: Methods of elemental organic chemistry. Moscow: Publishing House Acad. Sciences of the USSR, 1963.
- Nesmeyanov A.N. and Sokolik R.A. Ed. A. N. Nesmeyanova and К. A. Kocheshkova Bor. Aluminum. Gallium. Indium. Thallium. Series: Methods of elemental organic chemistry. Moscow: Publishing House Acad. Sciences of the USSR, 1964.
- Makarova L.G. and Nesmeyanov A.N. Ed. A. N. Nesmeyanova and К. A. Kocheshkova Mercury. Series: Methods of elemental organic chemistry. Moscow: Publishing House Acad. Sciences of the USSR, 1965.
- Nesmeyanov A.N., Belikov V.M.Problem of food synthesis. Series: Report at the plenary session / XI Mendeleev Congress on General and Applied Chemistry. Moscow: Nauka, 1965.
- Nesmeyanov A.N.Research in Organic Chemistry. Selected works 1959-1969. Moscow: Nauka, 1971.
- Nesmeyanov A.N. and Nesmeyanov N.A. The Beginnings of Organic Chemistry. In two books. Moscow: Chemistry, 1969.
- Nesmeyanov A.N. and Nesmeyanov N.A. The Beginnings of Organic Chemistry. In two books. Moscow: Chemistry, 1970.

== Literature ==
- Kabachnik, M.I, ed. (1988). Alexander Nikolaevich Nesmeyanov: Scientist and man. Scientists of the USSR. Essays, memoirs, materials. Moskva: Nauka. ISBN 5-02-005992-7.
- Moscow University in the Great Patriotic War, 4th edition, revised and supplemented. M.: Moscow State University, 2020. 65, 116, 117, 118, 551s. ISBN 978-5-19-011499-7.
- Great Soviet Encyclopedia. Article: Nesmeyanov Alexander Nikolayevich.
- Levchenkov S.I.. Great Russian Encyclopedia. Article: Nesmeyanov Alexander Nikolayevich
- Nesmeyanov, A. N. On the swing of the 20th century. Knights of Science. M. Publishing center "Moskvovedenie".
- Nesmeyanov M.A. The Light of Love: Memories of Alexander Nikolevich Nesmeyanov. M.: Nauka Publishing House, 1999. ISBN 5-02-008355-0.
- Sadovnichiĭ, Viktor Antonovich (2019). O liudiakh Moskovskogo universiteta (3rd ed.). Moskva. ISBN 978-5-19-011397-6.
- Goryacheva R.I., Orlova V.Ya. Fokin A.V. etc. Alexander Nikolayevich Nesmeyanov: 1899-1980. Moscow: Nauka Publishing House, 1992. ISBN 5-02-001607-1.
- Ilchenko E.V., Ilchenko V.I. Academician Alexander Nikolayevich Nesmeyanov - Rector of Moscow University and President of the Academy of Sciences of the Soviet Union. Moscow: Moscow State University, 2014. 440 p. ISBN 978-5-19-010865-1.
- Ilchenko E.V., Ilchenko V.I. Academician Alexander Nikolayevich Nesmeyanov - Rector of Moscow University and President of the Academy of Sciences of the Soviet Union. Moscow: Moscow State University, 2014. 440 p. ISBN 978-5-19-010865-1.

Academic offices
Preceded by Sergey Vavilov	President of the Academy of Sciences of the USSR; 1951–1961	Succeeded by Mstislav Keldysh
