= Novosibirsk State University =

Public research university in Novosibirsk, Russia

- Новосибирский Государственный Университет
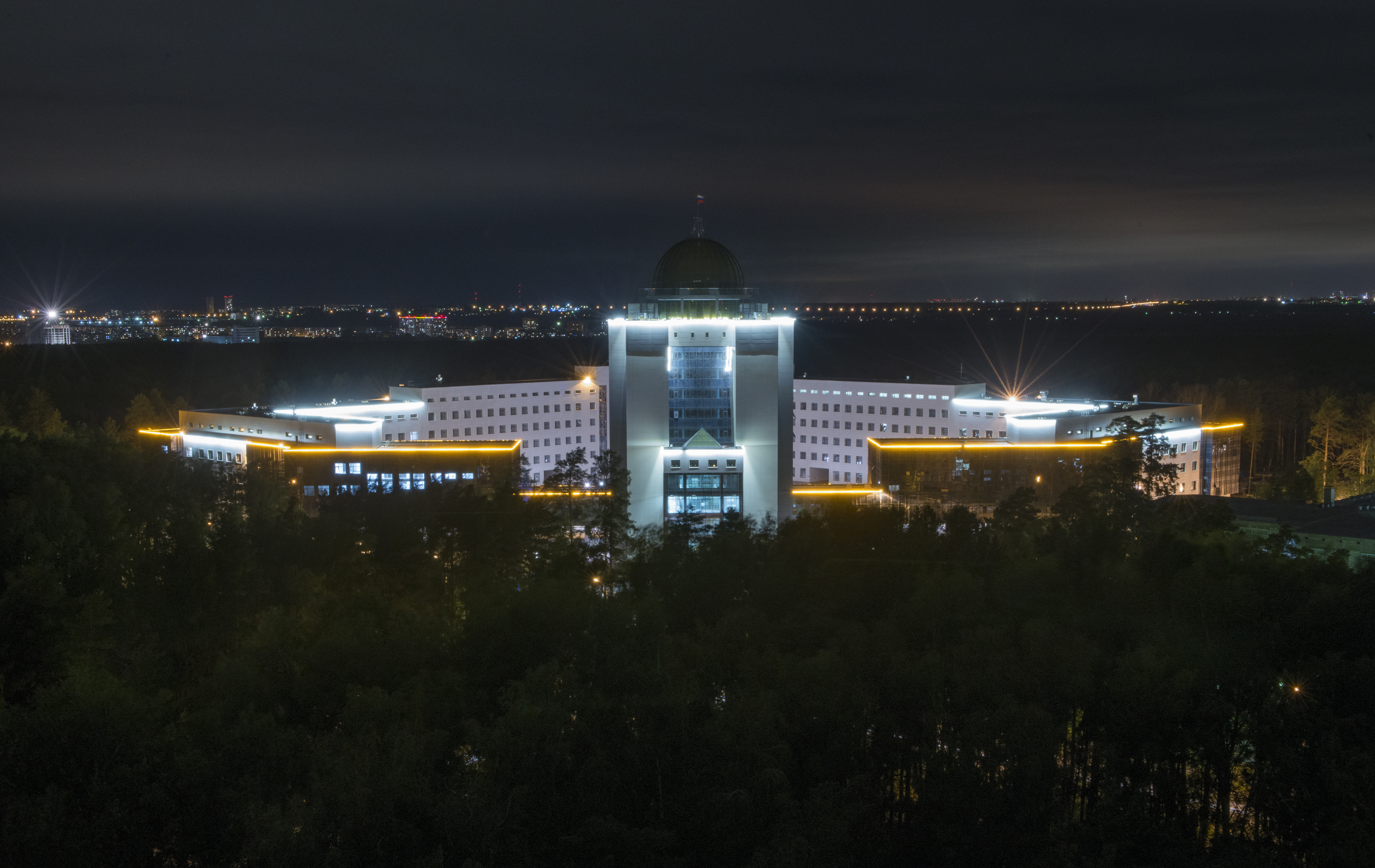
- New main building
- Motto: The Real Science
- Type: Public
- Established: 1958
- Endowment: RUB 41 million (2022)
- Rector: Mikhail Fedoruk
- Academic staff: 2500 (2022)
- Students: 7200 (2022)
- Location: 2 Pirogov Street, Novosibirsk, 630090, Russian Federation; 54.846°N 83.094°E
- Campus: Urban
- Website: english.nsu.ru

University rankings

Global – Overall
- QS World: =461 (2026)
- USNWR Global: 579 (2023)

Regional – Overall
- QS Emerging Europe and Central Asia: 8 (2022)

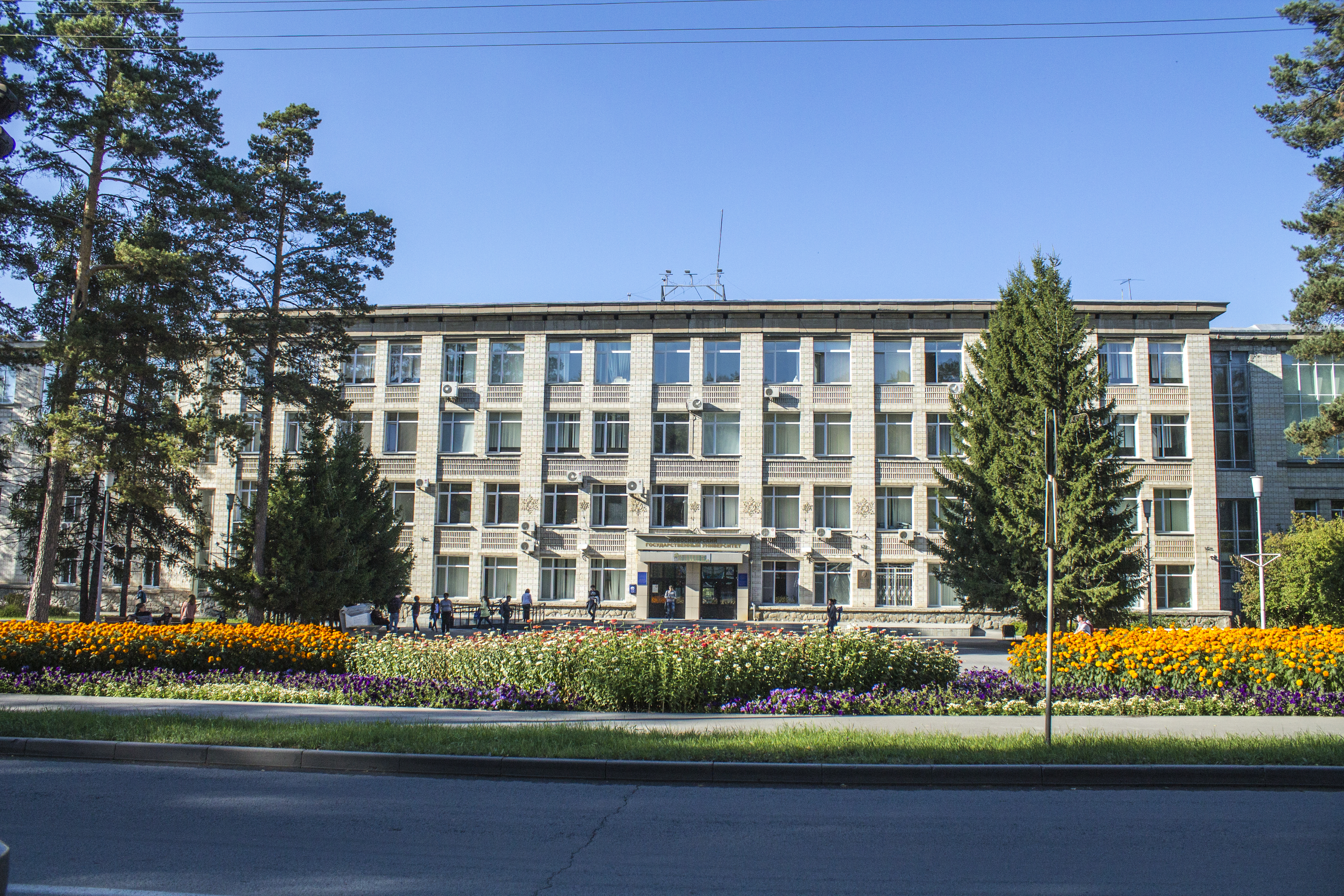
Old main building

Novosibirsk State University (NSU) is a public research university located in Novosibirsk, Russia. The university was founded in 1958, on the principles of integration of education and science, early involvement of students with research activities and the engagement of leading scientists in its teaching programmes.

As of 2022, Novosibirsk State University had 246th place in the rating of the QS World University Rankings, and in 2023 was ranked #579 in the world by U.S. News & World Report, and #801 in the world by World University Rankings by Times Higher Education.

== History ==
From the perspective of natural resources, Siberia has always been, and remains, the essential region for all of Russia. In the late 1950s, Siberia provided the country with 75% of its coal and possessed 80% of the nation's hydroelectric resources. Siberia became industrialized, but science then was largely of the applied variety and did not satisfy its needs. The USSR Academy of Sciences came to understand that there was a need to develop fundamental science. In 1958, this concept was implemented with the establishment of the Siberian Branch of the Academy of Sciences of the Soviet Union at Akademgorodok, near the industrial city of Novosibirsk. From the beginning, the founders of the Siberian Branch of the Academy of Sciences of the Soviet Union were concerned about providing the future scientific center with highly-trained personnel. In order to create a consistent source of personnel replenishment for Siberian scientific institutions, it was necessary to provide advanced training on the spot, thus the idea was born to establish a university in Novosibirsk.

On 9 January 1958, the Novosibirsk State University was officially founded by the Council of Ministers of the Soviet Union decree. First entry examinations were conducted in August 1959. Classes began on 28 September 1959. Following its establishment in 1958, Novosibirsk State University quickly grew. During the first nine years 1966 professionals were trained within its walls. It consisted of six faculties, was staffed with 270 teachers, and conducted research in 46 sections.

Novosibirsk State University was from its inception existing in close collaborative association with Siberian Branch of the Academy of Sciences research and development institutions of which there are several dozen within an area of 1.5 square km. The project of an "akademgorodok," an academic town with a university as its core, was exhibited at the 1967 World Expo in Montreal, after which Novosibirsk's Akademgorodok became model for other academic towns throughout the Soviet Union.

=== Political positions; invasion of Ukraine ===
On 17 April 2022, members of the community of Novosibirsk State University issued a joint statement strongly condemning the 2022 Russian invasion of Ukraine, calling on the Russian state to immediately withdraw the Russian troops from Ukraine, and bring to justice those responsible for the war crimes during the invasion, and saying “There are no reasonable grounds for this war, thousands of Ukrainian and Russian military and civilians of Ukraine have already died in it, and every day of hostilities brings more and more victims.”

== Structure ==
Novosibirsk State University has the following educational divisions:

- Institute for the Humanities
- Vladimir Zelman Institute for Medicine and Psychology
- Institute for the Philosophy and Law
- Faculty of Mathematics and Mechanics
- Faculty of Physics
- Faculty of Geology and Geophysics
- Faculty of Natural Sciences
- Faculty of Information Technologies
- Faculty of Economics
- Institute for Retraining and Advanced Training
- Centre of additional education

The structure of the university also includes 3 dissertation councils of the Highest Attestation Commission within Ministry of Science and Higher Education and 6 own dissertation councils.

== Educational programmes ==
As of 2020, Novosibirsk State University conducted training on 43 four-year bachelor's programmes, 7 five-year specialist's programmes, 1 six-year specialist's programmes, 93 two-year master's programmes, 9 two-year residency's programmes, 25 three-year graduate school programmes, 32 four-year graduate school programmes taught in Russian, and 5 two-year master's programmes, 1 two-year residency's programme taught in English.

== Additional military education ==
As of 2022, Novosibirsk State University doesn't have a military training center. Earlier, the university had military department which conducted the training reserve commissioned officers from among students of the university, but this department was disbanded in 2008.

== Language centres ==
The university has language centres which offer courses in English, German, French, Italian, Spanish, Japanese, Chinese as a second language.

== Education for foreign students ==
=== Grants and scholarships ===
Every year, international students have an opportunity to apply for the Russian Government Scholarship which covers full tuition and provides a monthly living allowance. Travel costs, living expenses and a health insurance policy are not included. These Scholarships are granted on a competitive basis; the selection criteria and procedures as well as the number of scholarships available depend on the home country of applicant. Additionally, students from NSU's partner universities have the opportunity to apply to such programs as Erasmus+, DAAD, and the Fulbright Program.

=== Distributed education ===
In September 2015, NSU announced its first courses delivered on the Coursera platform. Since January 2016, 12 courses have been offered on Coursera, and on the Russian distributed learning platform, Lectorium.

=== Research internships ===
The main feature such research internships are their interdisciplinary approach. Specialists in biology, physics, mathematics, geology, archaeology, and chemistry work with one another in the 35 research institutes of the Siberian Branch of the Russian Academy of Sciences.

=== Siberian Summer School ===
Beginning in 2017, the Siberian Summer School held at NSU each July includes courses on the chemistry of future materials, big data analytics and the philosophical and historical aspects of East-West relationships. All Summer School courses are taught in English.

=== Russian language courses ===
Novosibirsk State University offers courses for students matriculating with various levels of Russian language competence.

== Education for disabled persons ==
Novosibirsk State University is one of Russian universities which has established an educational programmes for disabled students.

== Research ==
Novosibirsk State University is a scientific and educational centre. Situated in the research center of Siberian Branch of the Russian Academy of Sciences, Novosibirsk State University's principal areas of teaching and research include elementary particle physics, photonics and quantum optics, Arctic research, biomedicine and cancer therapy, chemical engineering, low-dimensional hybrid materials, omic technologies, mathematics, archaeology and ethnography, and linguistics among other disciplines.

=== Interdisciplinary Centre for Elementary Particle Physics and Astrophysics ===
The Novosibirsk State University Interdisciplinary Centre for Elementary Particle Physics and Astrophysics (ICEPPA) links 13 laboratories working in the fields of elementary particle physics and astrophysics. The Interdisciplinary Centre’s Laboratories participate in large international collaborative scientific projects including experiments in the fields of high energy physics, astrophysics and cosmic ray physics. The Centre is engaged in the following research projects:

- Astrophysics Cosmology and Cosmic Rays
- Experiments on electron-positron colliders
- Experiments on hadron colliders
- Search for new physical phenomena in experiments with intense muon beams. The Laboratory for Exploration for Interactions Outside the Standard Model Framework participates in the preparation of two experiments at Fermilab (USA). One experiment, Mu2e, is the search for the conversion of a muon into an electron when interacting with nuclei, while the other experiment, g-2, is devoted to a precise measurement of the magnetic moment of the muon.
- Development of new detectors and colliders.

=== The Aston-Novosibirsk State University International Centre for Photonics ===
The main objective of the Centre is to develop a physical platform aimed at the application of advanced knowledge in laser technologies, in long-distance communication and in medical sensing devices technologies. The Centre's principal areas of research include:

- advanced concepts and fundamental new theories in nonlinear photonic devices and systems
- new technologies for optical communications, lasers, safe data transmission and medicine
- practical applications of developed technologies in high-speed coherent optical communications, in advanced laser systems for scientific, industrial and medical applications, and in innovative systems for safe data transmission.

The Center for Photonics was created in partnership with Aston University (UK) and offers NSU students access to world-class laboratories in the field of high-speed optical communications, fiber-optic and, femtosecond laser technologies.

=== International collaborations ===
Research groups are involved in 38 international collaborations;

Novosibirsk State University has six international collaborations in the field of physics, elementary particles and astrophysics and 12 ongoing collaborations with the Budker Institute of Nuclear Physics of the Siberian Branch of the Russian Academy of Sciences.

Novosibirsk State University has partnership agreements with 141 universities representing 27 countries.

== University journals ==
Novosibirsk State University publishes the following journals:

- Vestnik NSU. Series: information technologies in education (ISSN 1818-7900)
- Vestnik NSU. Series: biology, clinical medicine (ISSN 1818-7943)
- Vestnik NSU. Series: mathematics, mechanics, computer science (ISSN 1818-7897)
- Vestnik NSU. Series: history, philology (ISSN 1818-7919)
- Vestnik NSU. Series: pedagogy (ISSN 1818-7889)
- Vestnik NSU. Series: law (ISSN 1818-7986)
- Vestnik NSU. Series: physics (ISSN 1818-7994)
- Vestnik NSU. Series: philosophy (ISSN 1818-796X)
- Vestnik NSU. Series: psychology (ISSN 1995-865X)
- Vestnik NSU. Series: information technologies (online) (ISSN 2410-0420)

== Subordinate educational institutions ==
=== Specialized Educational Scientific Centre ===
The Specialized Educational Scientific Center (also known as Physics and Mathematics School) is a special secondary school, founded in 1963. It focuses on two fields, including mathematics & physics and chemistry & biology. An education system resembles the college education, with separate general lectures and small-group seminars.

As of 2023, according to the RAEX Rating Agency's (non-credit rating agency, affiliated with the credit rating agency Expert RA) rating, the Specialized Educational Scientific Centre is in the Top-5 best Russian secondary schools by the absolute number of graduates enrolled best Russian universities and in the Top-8 best Russian secondaru schools by the competitiveness of graduates.

=== Higher College of Computer Science ===
The Higher College of Computer Science is a vocational school focused on the training of programmers, which was integrated into the structure of the university in 1991.

=== Chinese-Russian Institute ===
The Chinese-Russian Institute conducts educational bachelor's, master's, graduate school programmes in collaboration with Heilongjiang University.

== Notable alumni ==
- Sergey Alekseenko (born 1950) - Russian/Soviet applied physicist, director of Kutateladze Institute of Thermophysics
- Raissa Berg - geneticist and evolutionary biologist
- Andrey Bocharov (born 1960) - actor and screenwriter
- Konstantin Bryliakov (born 1977) - chemist
- Nikolay Dikansky (born 1941) - physicist
- Viktor Fadin (born 1942) - theoretical physicist
- Alexey Fridman (1940–2010) - astrophysicist
- Nikolay Goncharov (born 1984) - scientist, specialised in plants' genetics
- Sergey Goncharov (born 1951) - mathematician
- Victor Ivrii (born 1949) - Russian-Canadian mathematician, specializes in microlocal analysis, spectral theory and partial differential equations
- Victor Kharitonin (born 1972) - billionaire, co-founder of Pharmstandard
- Bakhadyr Khoussainov (born 1961) - mathematician, Humboldt Prize winner
- Igor Kim (born 1966) - businessman
- Mikhail Kokorich (born 1976) - co-founder of Dauria Aerospace
- Ilya Kuprov (born 1981) - British physicist
- Larisa Maksimova (born 1943) - Soviet/Russian mathematician
- Sergei Netyosov (born 1953) - molecular biologist
- Aleksandr Pushnoy (born 1975) - actor, songwriter and TV host
- Renad Sagdeev (born 1941) - chemist
- Vladimir Shiltsev (born 1965) - Russian-American accelerator physicist
- Mark Stockman (born Mark Ilyich Shtokman) - Soviet-born American physicist
- Arkady Vainshtein (born 1942) - Russian-American physicist, winner of 2016 Dirac Medal
- Valentin Vlasov (1946–2020) - diplomat and politician
- Ershov Yury (born 1940) - mathematician
- Vladimir E. Zakharov (born 1939) - Russian-American physicist, winner of 2003 Dirac Medal
- Efim Zelmanov (born 1955) - Russian-American mathematician, winner of 1994 Fields Medal

== See also ==
- Silicon Taiga
