= Cinema of Ukraine =

- No. of screens: 2,332 (2011)
  - Per capita: 5.6 per 100,000 (2011)
- Main distributors: B And H 20.0% Gemini Film 11.0% Kinomania 7.0%

Produced feature films (2009)
- Fictional: 10
- Animated: 2
- Documentary: 7

Number of admissions (2018)
- Total: 14,995,200
- National films: 448,400 (3.0%)

Gross box office (2011)
- Total: ₴345 million (~€10.6 million)
- National films: ₴4.62 million (~€142,000) (1.3%)

Ukrainian cinema is the art of film and creative movies made within the nation of Ukraine as well as by Ukrainian film makers abroad.

Despite a history of important and successful productions, the industry has often been characterized by a debate about its identity and the level of Russian and European influence. Ukrainian producers are active in international co-productions, while Ukrainian actors, directors and crew feature regularly in Russian (and formerly Soviet) films. Successful films have been based on Ukrainian people, stories or events, including Battleship Potemkin, Man with a Movie Camera, and Everything Is Illuminated.

The Ukrainian State Film Agency owns National Oleksandr Dovzhenko Film Centre, film copying laboratory and archive, and takes part in hosting the Odesa International Film Festival. Another festival, Molodist in Kyiv, is the only FIAPF accredited International Film Festival held in Ukraine; the competition program has sections for student films, first short films, and first full feature films from all over the world. It is held during the month of October every year.

Ukraine has had an influence on the history of the cinema. Ukrainian directors Alexander Dovzhenko, often cited as one of the most important early Soviet filmmakers, as well as being a pioneer of Soviet montage theory, Dovzhenko Film Studios, and Sergei Parajanov, Armenian film director and artist who made significant contributions to Ukrainian, Armenian and Georgian cinema. He invented his own cinematic style, Ukrainian poetic cinema, which was totally out of step with the guiding principles of socialist realism.

Other important directors including Kira Muratova, Sergei Loznitsa, Myroslav Slaboshpytskyi, Larisa Shepitko, Sergei Bondarchuk, Leonid Bykov, Yuri Ilyenko, Leonid Osyka, Ihor Podolchak with his Delirium and Maryna Vroda. Many Ukrainian actors have achieved international fame and critical success, including: Vera Kholodnaya, Bohdan Stupka, Eugene Hütz, Milla Jovovich, Olga Kurylenko, Mila Kunis, Mark Ivanir.

On 10 March 2024, creators of the documentary film 20 Days in Mariupol were awarded with the Oscar in the category "Best Documentary Feature Film," the first Oscar in Ukraine's history.

== History of the cinema in Ukraine ==
=== Beginnings ===
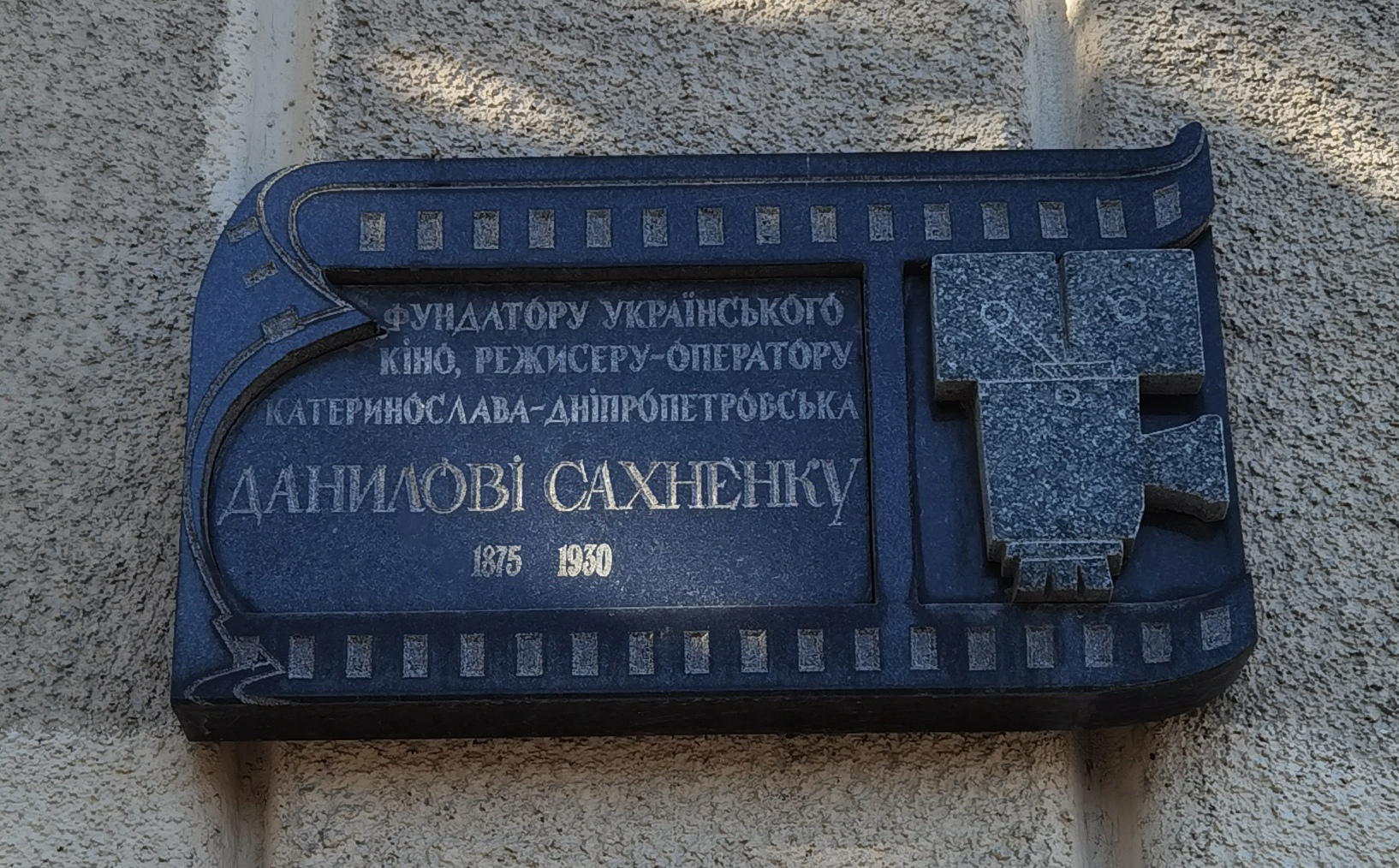
Memorial plaque to Danylo Sakhnenko in Dnipro

Ukrainian engineer Joseph Timchenko, a native of Kharkov Governorate ruled at the time by the Russian Empire, was the inventor of an early cinematographic device, which he first demonstrated during his work at Odessa University in November 1893. In 1896 Lumière brothers' cinematograph was brought to Odesa, presenting French-made short films. During the following year, Kharkiv photographer Alfred Fedetsky issued several films of his own production.

During the early 20th century, film studios organized in Kyiv, Kharkiv, Odesa and several other cities started producing movies dedicated to native Ukrainian themes. One of the pioneers of early Ukrainian cinema was Danylo Sakhnenko, who created the first full-length Ukrainian film in 1911. During the same year, theatrical performances based on plays by Ivan Tobilevych and Ivan Kotliarevsky and starring Mykola Sadovskyi, Maria Zankovetska and several other prominent Ukrainian actors were recorded on film in Katerynoslav.

=== Revolution and beginning of Soviet rule ===
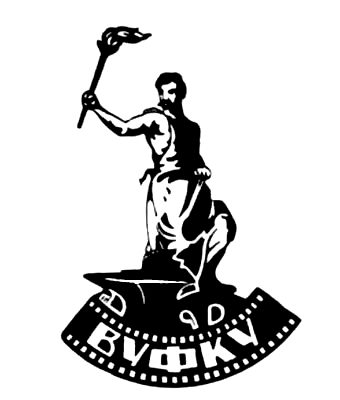
Logo of VUFKU

During the Ukrainian Revolution, the development of Ukrainian cinema almost ground to a halt, although several documentaries were created by the Ukrainifilm company under the Ukrainian State. Following the Bolshevik occupation, all cinema studios were nationalized and in 1922 united into the All-Ukrainian Photo Cinema Administration (VUFKU) subordinated to the People's Commissariat of Education. Two film studios ("cinema factories") were established in Yalta and Odesa. In 1929 the Kyiv Cinema Factory was established as the biggest enterprise of the VUFKU.

1920s saw the most productive period in the history of Ukrainian cinema. The number of films produced in Ukraine grew from only 4 in 1923 to 36 in 1928, with the number of cinema industry employees increasing from 47 in 1923 to over 1,000 in 1929. Notable directors working in Ukraine during that time were Pyotr Chardynin, Vladimir Gardin, Georgi Stabovoi, Georgi Tasin, Dziga Vertov, Faust Lopatynsky, Marko Tereshchenko, Oleksandr Dovzhenko and Ivan Kavaleridze. A number of renowned Ukrainian authors of that period, such as Mykola Bazhan, Yuriy Yanovskyi, Hryhoriy Epik, Dmytro Falkivskyi and Oles Dosvitniy worked as screenwriters. Among Ukrainian actors who rose to fame during that era were Amvrosiy Buchma and Natalia Uzhviy.

The highest achievement of Ukrainian cinema was Oleksandr Dovzhenko's trilogy consisting of the films Zvenyhora (1928), Arsenal (1929) and Earth (1930).

=== Stalin era ===
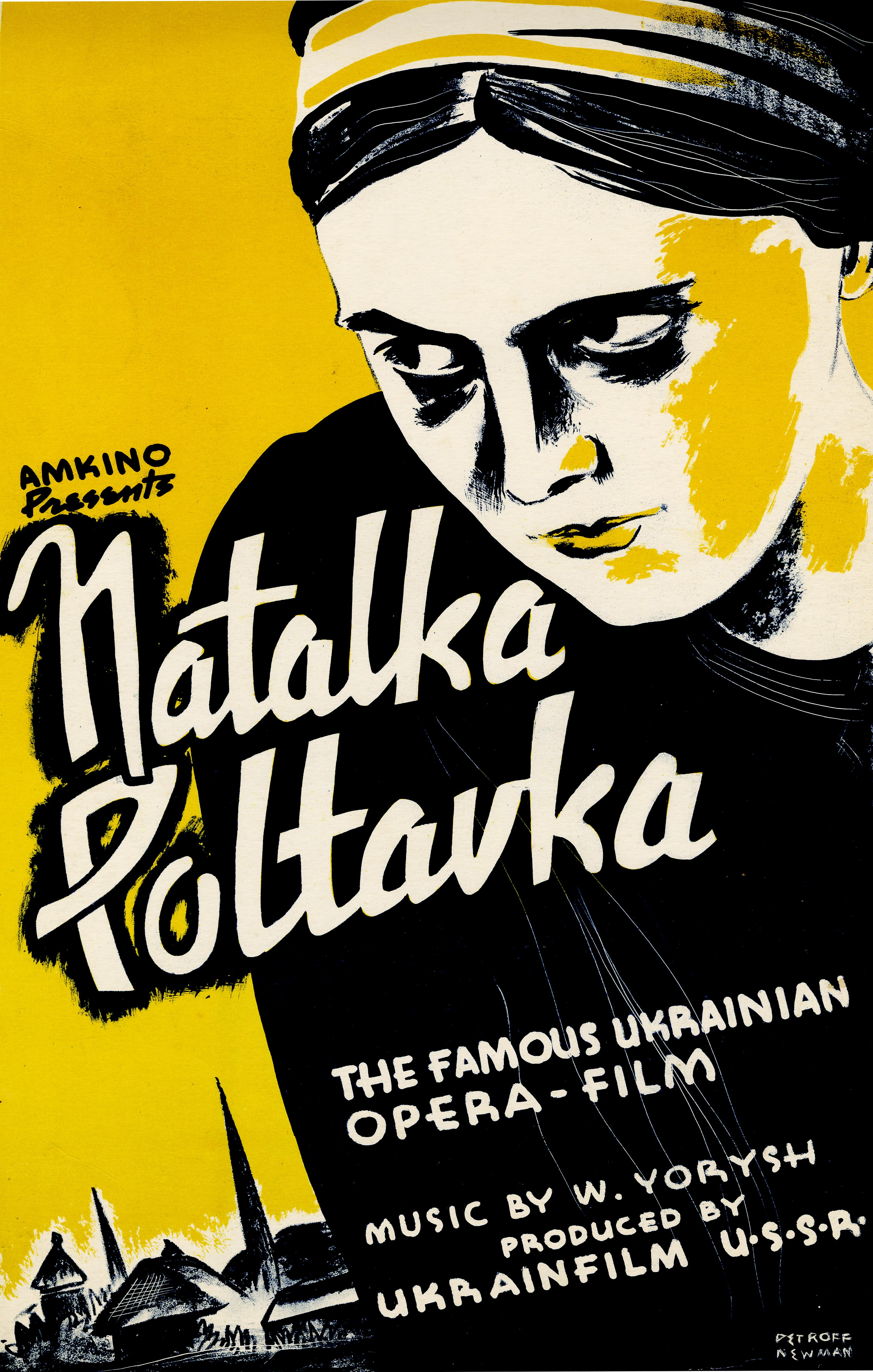
Poster of Natalka Poltavka (1936)

In 1930 VUFKU was disbanded and transformed into Ukrainfilm, which eventually became directly subordinate to Moscow. In 1933 the biweekly magazine Kino was closed down. Odesa Film Studios was de-facto turned into a branch of Moscow and Leningrad Film Studios, meanwhile Yalta Film Studios was directly transferred to the ownership of Russian cinema organizations. During the 1930s many Ukrainian directors were eliminated or forced to abandon their activity, while others had to subject themselves to ideological demands of authorities. Dovzhenko himself left for Moscow, where he worked for Mosfilm.

The 1930s saw a significant decrease in the number of films produced in Ukraine. New movies were created exclusively on the base of works by loyalist authors, such as Oleksandr Korniychuk, or classical literature. Among notable Soviet Ukrainian films of that time were Natalka Poltavka (1936) by Ivan Kavaleridze, Shchors (1939) by Oleksandr Dovzhenko and Bohdan Khmelnytsky (1941) by Ihor Savchenko.

Due to the Second World War, production of feature films in Ukraine practically ceased, with resources being directed to the creation of film propaganda and finishing previously started movies. Until the end of the war, film adaptations, usually dedicated to war topics, dominated the industry. The postwar period saw increasing Russification in the spirit of Zhdanov Doctrine, and the number of annually produced films remained low. One of the few notable Ukrainian cinematographic works of that time was Savchenko's Taras Shevchenko, starring Serhiy Bondarchuk.

=== Post-Stalin period ===
Starting from 1955, a revival of Ukrainian cinema started with the expansion of Kyiv and Odesa Studios. In 1957 Yalta Film Studios was once again incorporated into the structure of Ukrainian filmmaking industry. Most films were created in the spirit of Soviet official ideology and propaganda, and Russificatory trends continued. Between 1950 and 1958 the number of visitors in Ukrainian cinema theatres had increased threefold. In 1958, 109 titles of films were created in Ukraine.

During the 1960s, previously established trends continued in Ukrainian cinema, with most films of that period being screen adaptations. Among notable works of that time were Ivanna (1960) by Viktor Ivchenko; Chasing Two Hares (1961) by Viktor Ivanov, based on a play by Mykhailo Starytsky; Whore (1961) by Ivan Kavaleridze, after a story by Panas Myrny; Shadows of Forgotten Ancestors (1964) by Sergei Parajanov, based on a novel by Mykhailo Kotsiubynsky; A Spring for the Thirsty (1965) by Yuriy Illyenko (banned by censors). This decade became known for the phenomenon of "Ukrainian poetic cinema".

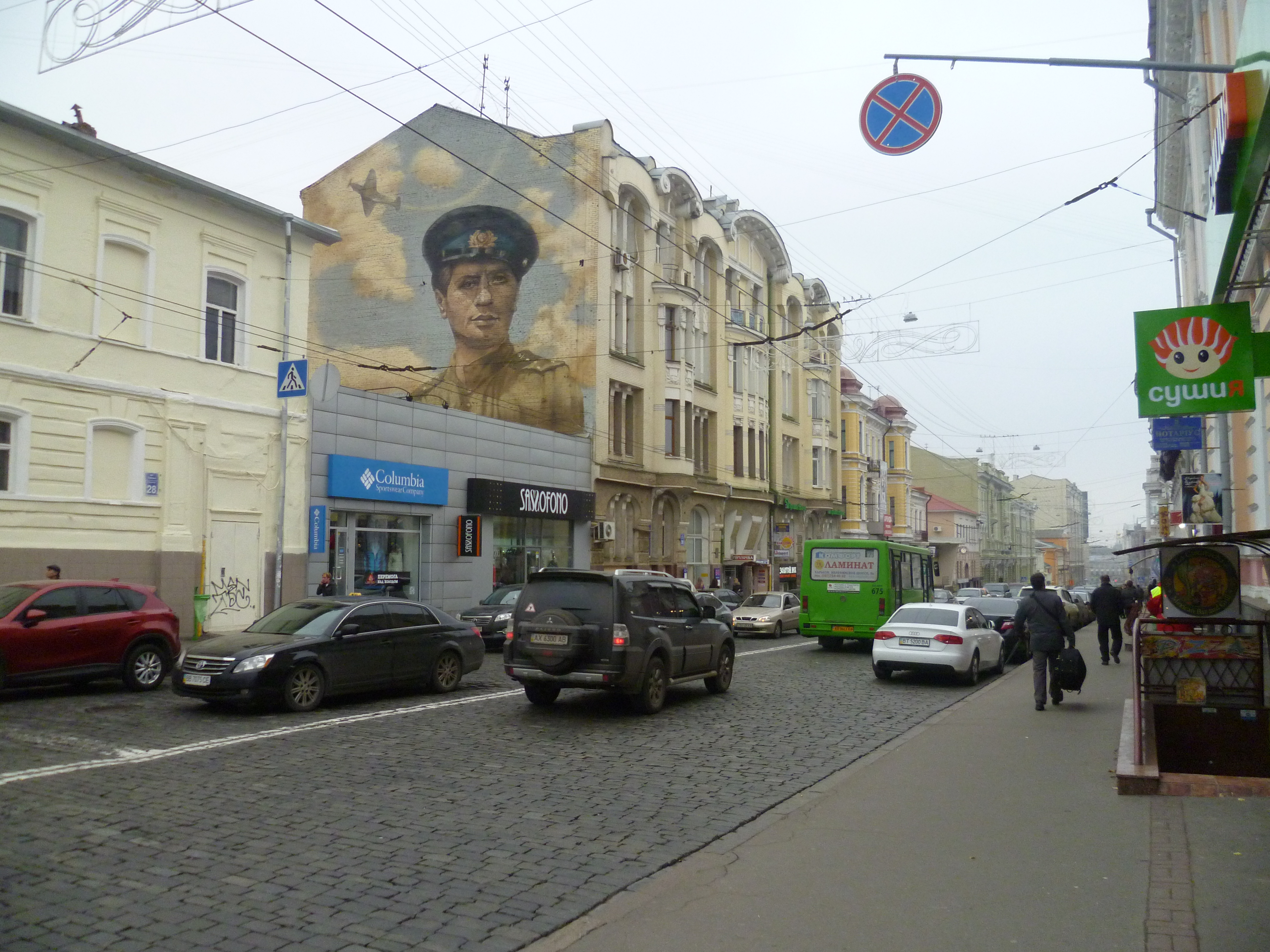
A mural depicting Leonid Bykov in Kharkiv

During the 1970s most films created in Ukraine were dedicated to the October Revolution of 1917, Second World War and Soviet partisan movement, industrial achievements of the Soviet Union and life of collective farms. As before, many films were adaptations of classical literary works. The new generation of Ukrainian filmmakers was represented by Yuriy Illyenko, known for his direction of The White Bird Marked with Black (1972), and Ivan Mykolaichuk, whose most famous film was Babylon XX (1979). Kyiv Studio of Popular Science Films created a number of historical movies. Many films of the "poetic cinema" movement were banned or limited in screening during the 1970s. Among notable war films issued during that period was Leonid Bykov's One-Two, Soldiers Were Going... (1977).

The last decade of Soviet Union's existence was represented in Ukrainian cinema by the work of Roman Balayan, whose film Flights in Dreams and Reality achieved widespread fame.

==== Films of Ukrainian SSR by ticket sales ====
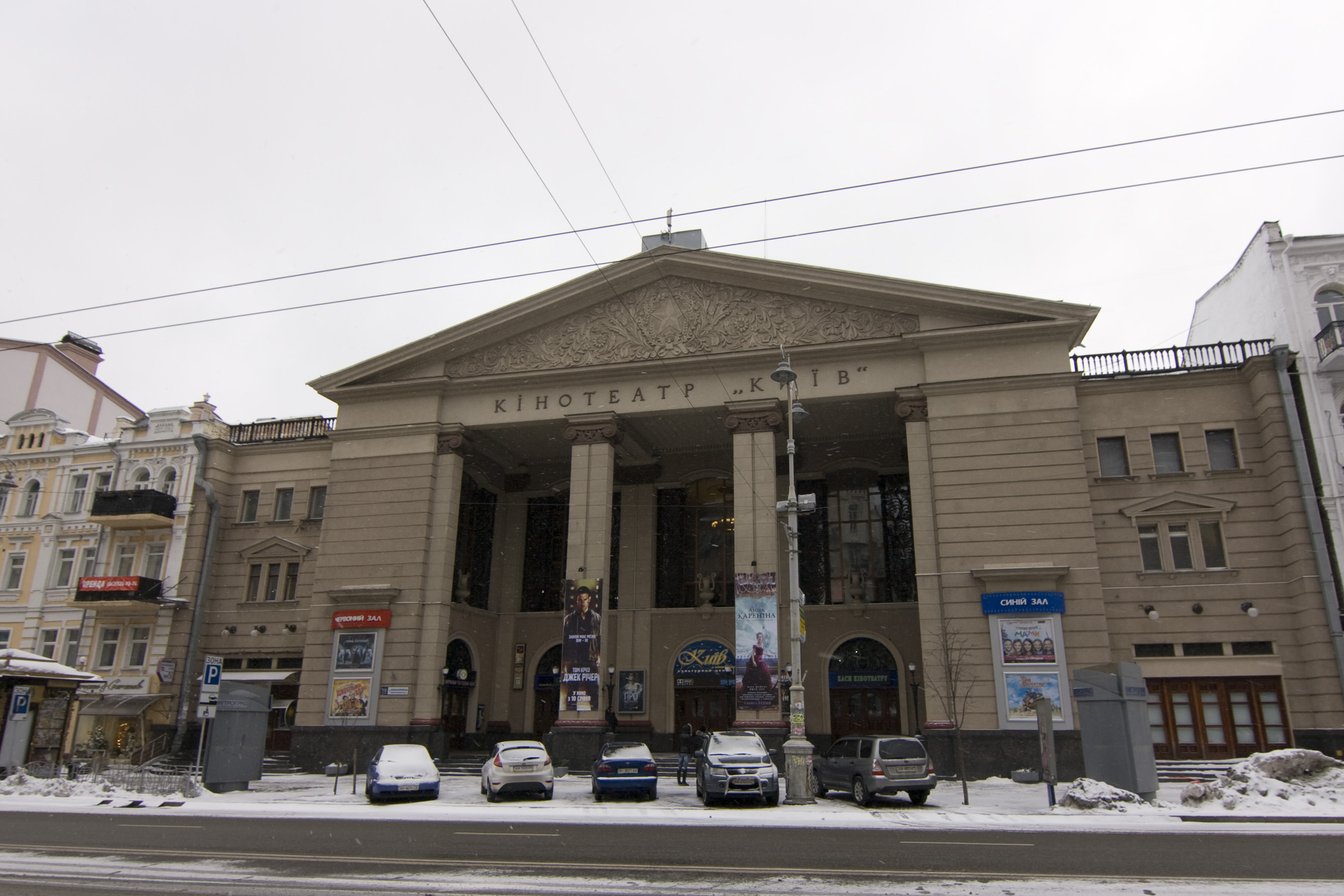
Kyiv movie theatre.

Ukrainian title	English title	Year	Tickets sold (millions)
НП – Надзвичайна пригода	E.A. — Extraordinary Accident	1959	47.5
У бій ідуть лише «старі»	Only Old Men Are Going to Battle	1973	44.3
Вдалечінь від батьківщини	Far from the Motherland	1960	42.0
Доля Марини	Marina's Destiny	1954	37.9
Подвиг розвідника	Secret Agent	1947	22.73

=== Modern Ukrainian cinema ===
Among Ukrainian filmmakers who rose to prominence during the 1990s were Villen Novak and Mykhailo Illyenko. In 1994 Dovzhenko Centre, Ukraine's biggest film archive was established. In 1997 Viacheslav Kryshtofovych's film A Friend of the Deceased became the first Ukrainian work to be nominated for Oscars. In 1998 Ukraine's first movie theatre to be equipped according to modern technological demands was opened. Following Ukraine's independence, a number of films presenting parts of the country's history previously obscured by Soviet propaganda appeared, most notably The Undefeated by Oles Yanchuk, dedicated to the activities of the Ukrainian Insurgent Army.

Logo of the Ukrainian State Film Agency

During the first two decades of Ukrainian independence, the country's cinema industry experienced a severe decline due to lack of government support and inefficient allocation of budgets. The situation started to change in 2012, as Mykhailo Illyenko's film Firecrosser became the first Ukrainian movie to gather over $200,000 in distribution. This achievement produced a new interest for Ukrainian filmmaking and contributed to the emergence of new works in different genres. In 2012, the gross turnover of Ukrainian movie theatres exceeded $100,000,000. After the annexation of Crimea, Yalta Film Studios was appropriated by Russian authorities.

A significant brekthrough for Ukrainian filmmaking was the international success of Myroslav Slaboshpytskyi's film The Tribe (2014). Among Ukrainian directors whose works received critical acclaim on the global stage in recent years are Sergei Loznitsa, Nariman Aliev, Antonio LukichValentyn Vasianovych, Iryna Tsilyk and Anatoliy Lavrenishyn. In 2024 Mstyslav Chernov's documentary 20 Days in Mariupol, dedicated to the Russian invasion of Ukraine, won the Academy Award for Best Documentary Feature Film. As a result of the Russo-Ukrainian War, the turnover of Ukrainian movie theatres decreased from $114,000,000 in 2019 to $37,000,000 in 2022. Despite this, during the first eight months of 2023 Ukrainian filmmakers managed to increase their incomes in comparison to 2019, with the share of national product reaching 21% of all films in distribution.

== Notable film directors and actors ==
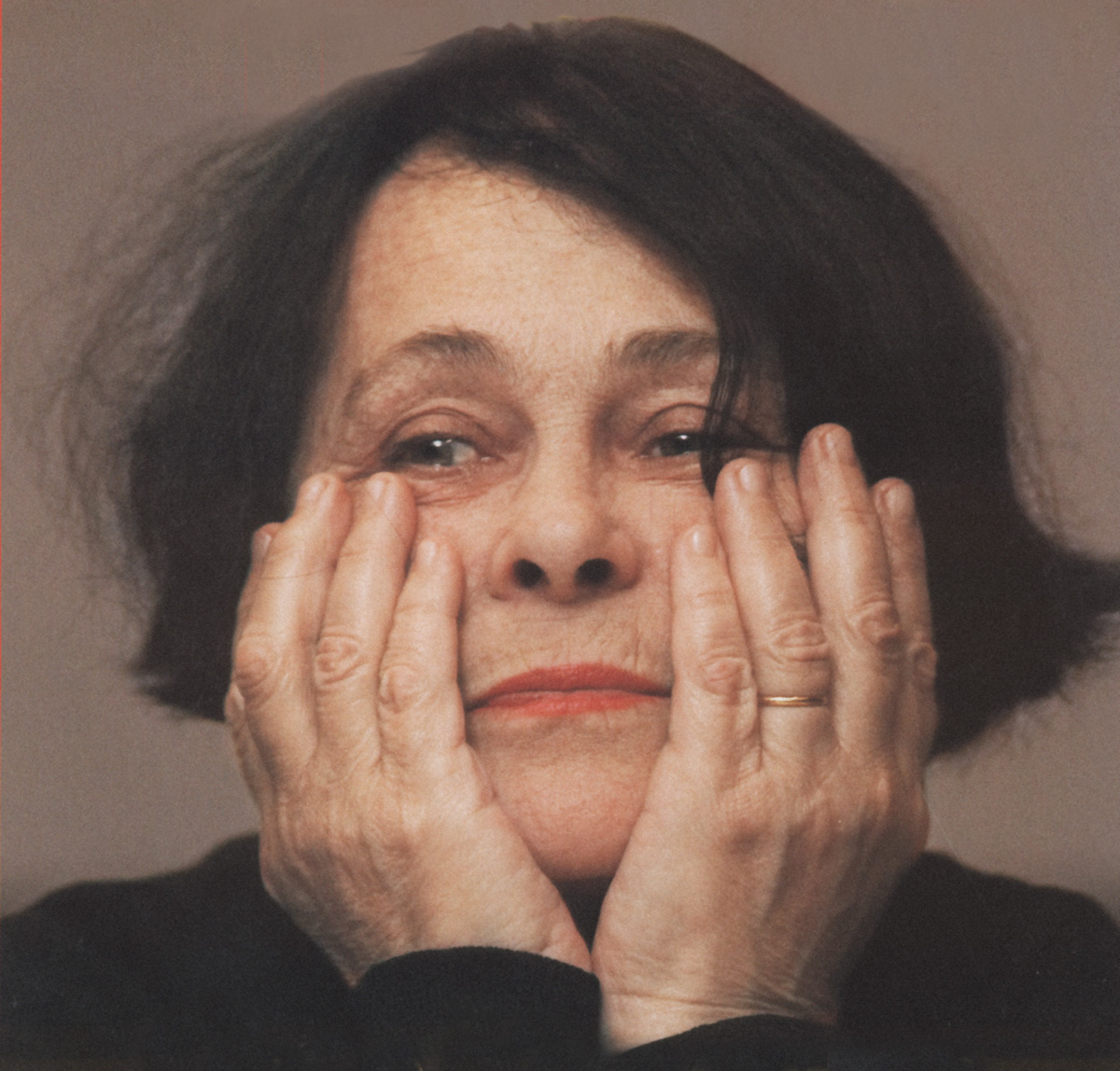
Filmmaker Kira Muratova

Prominent Ukrainian directors include Oleksandr Dovzhenko, Dziga Vertov and Serhiy Paradzhanov. Dovzhenko is often cited as one of the most important early Soviet filmmakers, as well as being a pioneer of Soviet montage theory and founding Dovzhenko Film Studios. In 1927, Dziga Vertov moved from Moscow to Ukraine. At the film studio VUFKU he made several avant-garde documentaries, among them The Eleventh Year, Man with a Movie Camera and first Ukrainian documentary sound film Enthusiasm (Symphony of the Donbass). Paradzhanov was an Armenian film director and artist who made significant contributions to Ukrainian, Armenian and Georgian cinema; he invented his own cinematic style, Ukrainian poetic cinema, which was totally out of step with the guiding principles of socialist realism. Many actors of Ukrainian origin have achieved international fame and critical success, including Vira Kholodna, Bohdan Stupka, Sergei Makovetsky, Mike Mazurki, Natalie Wood, Danny Kaye, Jack Palance, Milla Jovovich, Olga Kurylenko and Mila Kunis.

== Museums ==
On the territory of Odesa Film Studio, there is a Museum of the Cinema, which showcases the history of the cinema in general and history of Ukrainian cinema. It holds historic materials from the invention of cinema, to the postmodern, digital and avant-garde.

== Government and civil bodies concerned ==
This sphere is administrated by the Ministry of Culture of Ukraine and the Ukrainian Association of Cinematographers.

The central executive body of cinematography in Ukraine is the Ukrainian State Film Agency (USFA). Together with the Ukrainian Cultural Foundation, it is the largest investor in Ukrainian cinema and as of 2019 each of these institutions is investing about ₴500 million in Ukrainian film production.

== Film studios ==
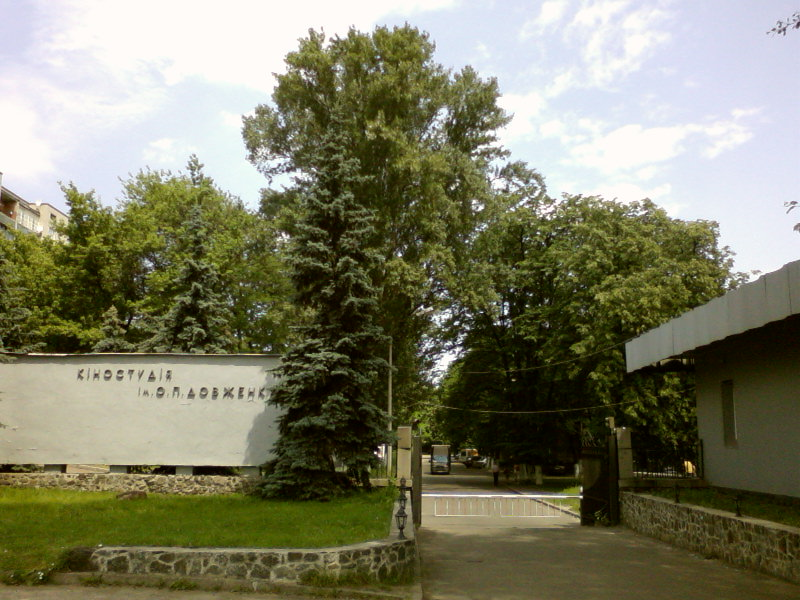
Central entrance to Dovzhenko Film Studios.

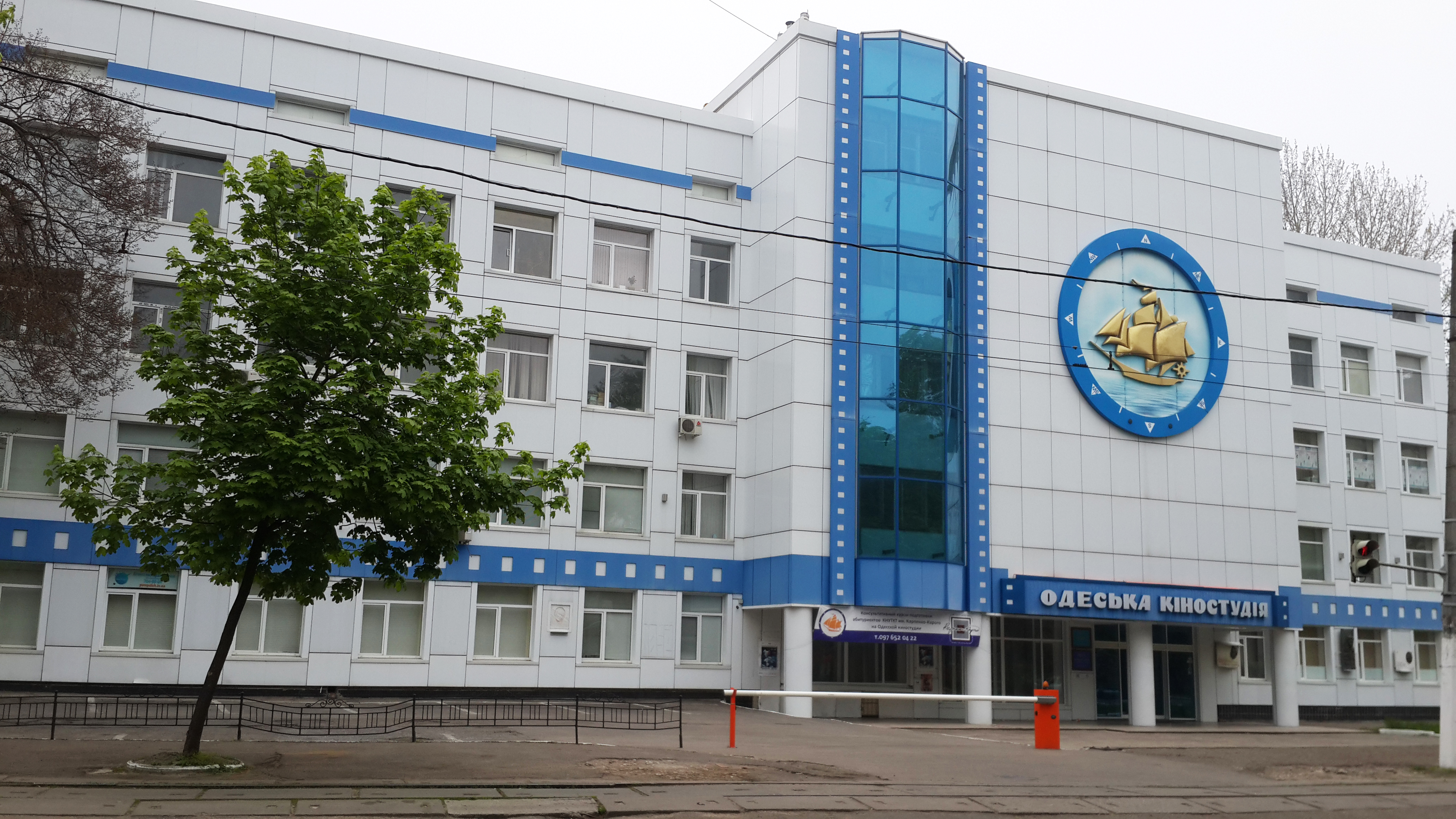
Exterior of the Odesa Film Studio

=== State owned ===
- Dovzhenko Film Studios (Kyiv)
- Kyivnaukfilm (Kyiv)
- National Cinematheque of Ukraine (former part of Kyivnaukfilm) (Kyiv)
- Odesa Film Studio (Odesa)
- Ukranimafilm (former part of Kyivnaukfilm) (Kyiv)
- Ukrtelefilm (Kyiv)
- Yalta Film Studio (Yalta)

=== Privately owned ===
- Animagrad (Kyiv)
- Film Service Illuminator
- Film.UA (Kyiv)
- Fresh Production
- Halychyna-Film Film Studio (Lviv)
- Interfilm Production Studio
- Kinofabryka
- Odesa Animation Studio (Odesa)
- Panama Grand Prix (Kyiv)
- Patriot Film
- Pronto Film (Kyiv)
- TUARON
- Star Media
- Studio KAPI
- Yalta-Film Film Studio (Yalta)

== Film distribution ==
B&H Film Distribution Company is a major Ukrainian film distributor; it is the local distributor of films by Walt Disney Pictures, Universal Pictures, Paramount Pictures, Sony Pictures Entertainment (Columbia Pictures).

Ukrainian Film Distribution (formerly Gemini Ukraine) is the local distributor of films by 20th Century Fox (Fox Searchlight Pictures, Blue Sky Studios).

VLG.FILM (formerly Volga Ukraine) is the local distributor of films by Miramax, StudioCanal, STX Entertainment, A24, Lionsgate, Focus Features International, EuropaCorp, Pathé Exchange, Kinology, Affinity Equity Partners, Exclusive Media Group, TF1 and others.

Kinomania is the local distributor of films by Warner Brothers (New Line Cinema).

Short films, festival winners and art house are mostly distributed by Arthouse traffic.

The newest website database system for the artists is the Ukrainian Film Industry Foundation

== Festivals ==
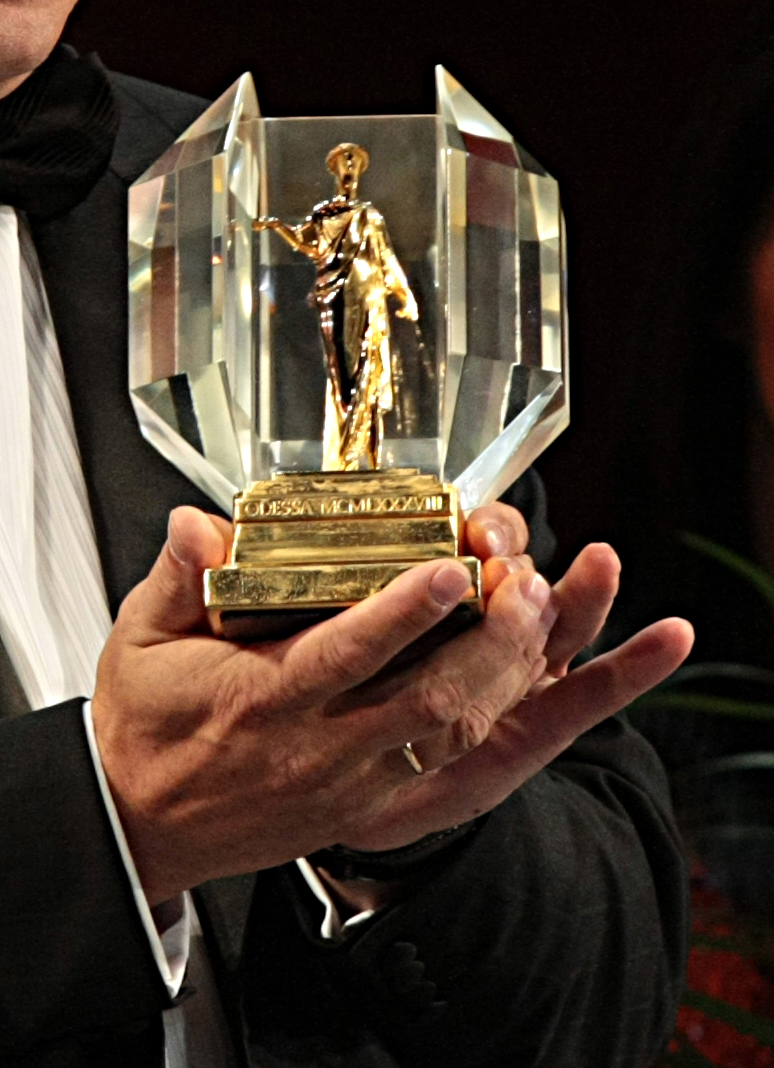
Odesa Film Festival Grand Prix

- Molodist, Kyiv International Film Festival, held in Kyiv (1970-)
- Kyiv International Film Festival (KIFF), held in Kyiv (2009-)
- Kyiv International Short Film Festival (KISFF), held in Kyiv (2012-)
- Kinolev, held in Lviv (2006-)
- Odesa International Film Festival, held in Odesa (2010-)
- Animation Film Festival "Krok", (1987) organized by the Ukrainian Association of Cinematographers and takes place in Ukraine and Russia
- Pokrov, international festival of Christian Orthodox cinema, held in Kyiv (2003-)
- Vidkryta Nich (Open Night), festival of Ukrainian debut short films, held in Kyiv (1997-)
- Kharkiv Siren Film Festival, international festival of short feature films, held in Kharkiv (2008-)
- Wiz-Art, International Short Film Festival, held in Lviv (2008-)
- VAU-Fest, International Video Art and Short Film Festival, held in the town of Ukrainka in Kyiv oblast (2010-)
- Kinofront, festival of Ukrainian Z and indie movies (2008-)
- Docudays UA, international human rights documentary film festival, held in Kyiv with traveling programs around Ukraine (2003-)
- Contact, international documentary film festival, held in Kyiv (2005-2007)
- Berdiansk International Film Festival "Golden Brigantine", festival of cinema made in Commonwealth of Independent States and Baltic countries, held in the city of Berdiansk (2011)
- Irpin Film Festival, International noncommercial festival of alternative cinema, held in the town of Irpin (2003)
- Golden Pektorale, International Truskavets Film Festival, held in the town of Truskavets
- Crown of Carpathians, Another International Truskavets Film Festival, held in the town of Truskavets
- Mute Nights, Odesa, International silent film festival which is held in Odesa on the third week on June.
- Kino-Yalta, festival of producer's cinema (2003) organized together with the Russian government
- Stozhary, held in Kyiv (1995-2005)
- Sebastopol International Film Festival, held in Sevastopol, Crimea (2005-2009, 2011)

== Awards ==
=== Current awards ===
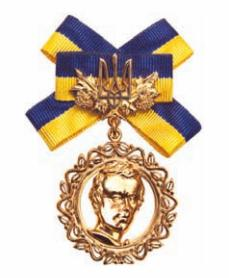
The Shevchenko National Prize for performing acts

- Shevchenko National Prize, for the Performing Arts
- Dovzhenko State Prize of Ukraine
- Scythian deer, the main prize of the International Student Cinematography Festival Molodist
- Golden Dzyga (Ukrainian Film Academy Awards), the main prize of the Odesa International Film Festival (OIFF)
- Sunny bunny of the international student cinematography festival Molodist
- Ukrainian Panorama of the international student cinematography festival Molodist

In 1987, Ukrainian engineer and animator Eugene Mamut together with three colleagues won the Oscar (Scientific and Engineering Award) for the design and development of RGA / Oxberry Compu-Quad Special Effects Optical Printer for the movie Predator.

In 2006, Ukrainian engineer and inventor Anatoliy Kokush was awarded two Oscars for the concept and development of the Ukrainian Arm gyro-stabilized camera crane and the Flight Head.

=== Former awards ===
- Lenin Komsomol Prize of Ukrainian SSR

== Notable films ==
- 1910 Шемелько-денщик або Хохол наплутав / Shemelko-Denshchyk, directed by Oleksandr Ostroukhov-Arbo
- 1912 Запорізька січ / Zaporizhian Sich, directed by Danylo Sakhnenko
- 1912 Любов Андрія / Andriy's Love, directed by Danylo Sakhnenko
- 1913 Полтава / Poltava, directed by Danylo Sakhnenko
- 1926 Ягідка кохання / Love's Berries, directed by Oleksandr Dovzhenko (silent film)
- 1926 Тарас Шевченко/ Taras Shevchenko, directed by Pyotr Chardynin
- 1926 Тарас Трясило / Taras Triasylo, directed by Pyotr Chardynin
- 1928 Звенигора / Zvenyhora, directed by Oleksandr Dovzhenko (silent film)
- 1928 Шкурник / Leather-man, directed by Mykola Shpykovsky (silent film)
- 1928 Одинадцятий /The Eleventh Year, directed by Dziga Vertov (documentary film)
- 1929 Арсенал / Arsenal, directed by Oleksandr Dovzhenko (silent film)
- 1929 Людина з кіноапаратом / Man with a Movie Camera, directed by Dziga Vertov (documentary film)
- 1930 Ентузіазм (Симфонія Донбасу)/ Enthusiasm, directed by Dziga Vertov (first Ukrainian documentary sound film)
- 1930 Земля / Earth, directed by Oleksandr Dovzhenko (silent film)
- 1932 Іван / Ivan, directed by Oleksandr Dovzhenko (silent film)
- 1932 Коліївщина / Koliyivshchyna, directed by Ivan Kavaleridze
- 1935 Аероград / Aerograd, directed by Oleksandr Dovzhenko (sci-fi)
- 1936 Наталка Полтавка / Natalka Poltavka, directed by Ivan Kavaleridze
- 1939 Щорс / Shchors, directed by Oleksandr Dovzhenko (biopic)
- 1941 Богдан Хмельницький / Bohdan Khmelnytsky, directed by Ihor Savchenko
- 1943 Битва за нашу Радянську Україну / Battle for Soviet Ukraine, directed by Oleksandr Dovzhenko
- 1947 Подвиг розвідника / Secret Agent, directed by Borys Barnet
- 1951 Тарас Шевченко / Taras Shevchenko, directed by Ihor Savchenko
- 1952 В степах України / In the Steppes of Ukraine, directed by Tymofiy Levchuk
- 1952 Украдене щастя / Stolen Happiness, directed by Hnat Yura (by the drama of Ivan Franko)
- 1953 Мартин Боруля / Martyn Borulia, directed by Oleksiy Shvachko
- 1955 Іван Франко / Ivan Franko, directed by Tymofiy Levchuk
- 1959 Григорій Сковорода / Hryhoriy Shovoroda, directed by Ivan Kavaleridze
- 1959 Іванна / Ivanna, directed by Viktor Ivchenko
- 1960 Наталія Ужвій / Nataliya Uzhviy, directed by Serhiy Paradzhanov
- 1961 За двома зайцями / Chasing Two Hares, directed by Viktor Ivanov (by the play of Mykhailo Starytsky)
- 1961 Повія / Whore, directed by Ivan Kavaleridze
- 1962 Квітка на камені (Ніхто так не кохав) / Flower on the Stone, directed by Serhiy Paradzhanov
- 1963 Королева бензоколонки / Queen of the Gas Station, directed by Mykola Litus and Oleksiy Mishurin
- 1964 Тіні забутих предків / Shadows of Forgotten Ancestors, directed by Serhiy Paradzhanov
- 1964 Сон / The Dream, directed by Volodymyr Denysenko
- 1965 Гадюка / The Viper, directed by Viktor Ivchenko
- 1965 Криниця для спраглих / A Spring for the Thirsty, directed by Yuriy Illienko
- 1966 Соловей із села Маршинці / Nightingale from the Village of Marshyntsi, directed by Rostyslav Synko (musical featuring Sofia Rotaru)
- 1967 Київські мелодії / Kyiv Melodies, directed by Ihor Samborskyi
- 1968 Анничка / Annychka, directed by Borys Ivchenko
- 1968 Камінний хрест / Stone cross, directed by Leonid Osyka (by the novels of Vasyl Stefanyk)
- 1969 Ми з України / We are from Ukraine, directed by Vasyl Illiashenko
- 1971 Білий птах з чорною ознакою / White Bird with Black Mark, directed by Yuriy Illienko
- 1971 Захар Беркут / Zakhar Berkut, directed by Leonid Osyka (by the story of Ivan Franko)
- 1971 Червона рута / Chervona Ruta, directed by Roman Oleksiv (musical featuring Sofia Rotaru and Vasyl Zinkevych)
- 1972 Пропала Грамота / The Lost Letter, directed by Borys Ivchenko
- 1973 У бій ідуть лише «старі» / Only Old Men are Going to Battle, directed by Leonid Bykov
- 1974 Марина / Maryna, directed by Borys Ivchenko
- 1975 Пісня завжди з нами / Song is Always with Us, directed by Viktor Storozhenko (musical featuring Sofia Rotaru)
- 1976 Ати-бати, йшли солдати... / Aty-baty, Soldiers were Going..., directed by Leonid Bykov
- 1976 Тривожний місяць вересень / The Troubled Month of Veresen, directed by Leonid Osyka
- 1977 Весь світ в очах твоїх... / All the World is in Your Eyes, directed by Stanislav Klymenko
- 1978 Море / Sea, directed by Leonid Osyka
- 1979 Дударики / Dudaryky, directed by Stanislav Klymenko
- 1979 Вавілон XX / Babylon XX, directed by Ivan Mykolaichuk
- 1980 Чорна курка, або Підземні жителі / Black Chicken or the Underground Inhabitants, directed by Viktor Hres
- 1981 Така пізня, така тепла осінь / Such Late, Such Warm Autumn, directed by Ivan Mykolaichuk
- 1982 Повернення Баттерфляй / The Return of the Butterfly, directed by Oleh Fialko
- 1983 Польоти уві сні та наяву / Flights in Dreams and Reality, directed by Roman Balayan
- 1983 Колесо історії / Wheel of History, directed by Stanislav Klymenko
- 1983 Вир / Whirlpool, directed by Stanislav Klymenko
- 1984 Украдене щастя / Stolen Happiness, directed by Yuriy Tkachenko (by the drama of Ivan Franko)
- 1985 Вклонись до землі / Earth-reaching Bowing, directed by Leonid Osyka
- 1986 І в звуках пам'ять відгукнеться... / And Memory Will Recall in the Sounds..., directed by Tymofiy Levchuk
- 1987 Данило — князь Галицький / Danylo — Kniaz of Halychyna, directed by Yaroslav Lupiy
- 1988 Чорна Долина / Black Valley, directed by Halyna Horpynchenko
- 1989 Небилиці про Івана / Fables about Ivan, directed by Borys Ivchenko
- 1989 Камінна душа / Stone Soul, directed by Stanislav Klymenko
- 1989 В Далеку Путь / Taking Off, directed by Oles Yanchuk (short film)
- 1991 Голод-33 / Famine-33, directed by Oles Yanchuk
- 1991 Чудо в краю забуття / Miracle in the Land of Oblivion, directed by Natalia Motuzko
- 1992 Тарас Шевченко. Заповіт / Taras Shevchenko. Testament, directed by Stanislav Klymenko
- 1993 Гетьманські клейноди / Hetman's Regalia, directed by Leonid Osyka
- 1993 Сад Гетсиманський / Garden of Gethsemane, directed by Rostyslav Synko (by the novel of Ivan Bahriany)
- 1994 Тигролови / Tiger Catchers, directed by Rostyslav Synko (by the novel of Ivan Bahriany)
- 1995 Атентат - осіннє вбивство в Мюнхені / Assassination. An Autumn Murder in Munich, directed by Oles Yanchuk
- 1995 Москаль-чарівник / Moskal-Charivnyk, directed by Mykola Zasieiev-Rudenko
- 1997 Приятель небіжчика / A Friend of the Deceased, directed by Viacheslav Kryshtofovych
- 1998 Тупик / Dead End, directed by Hryhoriy Kokhan
- 1999 Як коваль щастя шукав / How the Blacksmith Looked for Happiness, directed by Radomyr Vasylevsky
- 2000 Нескорений / The Undefeated, directed by Oles Yanchuk
- 2001 Молитва за гетьмана Мазепу / Prayer for Hetman Mazepa, directed by Yuriy Illienko
- 2002 Чорна Рада / Chorna Rada, directed by Mykola Zasieiev-Rudenko
- 2003 Мамай / Mamay, directed by Oles Sanin
- 2004 Водій для Віри / A Driver for Vira, directed by Pavlo Chukhrai
- 2004 Залізна сотня / The Company of Heroes, directed by Oles Yanchuk
- 2004 Украдене щастя / Stolen Happiness, directed by Andriy Donchyk (by the drama of Ivan Franko)
- 2004 Між Гітлером і Сталіном — Україна в II Світовій війні / Between Hitler and Stalin, directed by Sviatoslav Novytsky (documentary film)
- 2005 День Сьомий. Півтори Години У Стані Громадянської Війни / Day Seven, directed by Oles Sanin (documentary film)
- 2005 Дрібний Дощ / Drizzle, directed by Heorhiy Deliyev (short film)
- 2005 Помаранчеве небо / The Orange Sky, directed by Oleksandr Kiriyenko
- 2006 Собор на крові / Sobor on the Blood, directed by Ihor Kobryn (documentary film)
- 2006 Музей Степана Бандери У Лондоні / Stepan Bandera Museum In London, directed by Oles Yanchuk (documentary film)
- 2006 Аврора / Aurora, directed by Oksana Bairak
- 2007 Богдан-Зиновій Хмельницький / Bohdan-Zynoviy Khmelnytskyi, directed by Mykola Mashchenko
- 2008 Сафо. Кохання без меж / Sappho. Love without Limits, directed by Robert Crombie
- 2008 Владика Андрей / Metropolitan Andrey, directed by Oles Yanchuk
- 2008 Ілюзія страху / Illusion of Fear, directed by Oleksandr Kiriyenko
- 2008 Меніни / Las Meninas, directed by Ihor Podolchak
- 2010 Щастя моє / My Joy, directed by Serhiy Loznytsia
- 2011 Вона заплатила життям / She Paid the Ultimate Price, directed by Iryna Korpan (documentary film)
- 2011 Той, хто пройшов крізь вогонь / Firecrosser, directed by Mykhailo Illienko
- 2011 Легка, як пір'їнка / Feathered Dreams, directed by Andriy Rozhen
- 2012 Деліріум / Delirium, directed by Ihor Podolchak
- 2012 Хайтарма / Haytarma, directed by Akhtem Seitablaiev
- 2013 Параджанов / Paradjanov, directed by Serge Avedikian and Olena Fetisova
- 2013 Брати. Остання сповідь / Brothers. The final confession, directed by Viktoriya Trofimenko
- 2014 Плем'я / The Tribe, directed by Myroslav Slaboshpytskyi
- 2014 Поводир / The Guide, directed by Oles Sanin
- 2014 Майдан / Maidan, directed by Serhiy Loznytsia (documentary film)
- 2015 Зима у вогні: Боротьба України за свободу / Winter on Fire: Ukraine's Fight for Freedom, directed by Yevhen Afinieievskyi (documentary film)
- 2015 Незламна / Indestructible, directed by Serhiy Mokrytskyi
- 2017 Кiборги: Герої не вмирають / Cyborgs: Heroes Never Die, directed by Akhtem Seitablayev
- 2017 Сторожова застава / The Stronghold, directed by Oleksiy Kovalyov
- 2019 Мої думки тихі / My Thoughts Are Silent, directed by Antonio Lukich
- 2021 Носоріг / Rhino, directed by Oleh Sentsov
- 2021 Бог простить / God Will Forgive, directed by Hovhannes Khachatryan (short film)
- 2022 Люксембург, Люксембург / Luxembourg, Luxembourg, directed by Antonio Lukich
- 2022 Памфір / Pamfir, directed by Dmytro Sukholytkyy-Sobchuk
- 2023 20 Days in Mariupol, directed by Mstyslav Chernov (documentary)
- 2023 Щедрик / Shchedryk, directed by Olesia Morhunets-Isaienko
- 2023 Shttl, directed by Ady-Walter (French-Ukrainian co-production)
- 2024 Ти - космос / U Are the Universe, directed by Pavlo Ostrikov (co-production with Belgium)

=== Top awards ===
Award	Category	Film title	Year	Director
Oscar	Best Documentary Feature Film	20 Days in Mariupol	2024	Mstyslav Chernov
Palme d'Or	Short Film	The Cross (Cross-country)	2011	Maryna Vroda
Palme d'Or	Short Film	Podorozhni (Wayfarers)	2005	Ihor Strembitskyi
Jury Prize Silver Bear at Berlinale	Short Film	Ishov tramvai N°9 (The Tram Was Going, Number Nine)	2003	Stepan Koval
Panorama Award of the NYFA at Berlinale	Short Film	Tyr (Shooting Gallery)	2001	Taras Tomenko
FIPRESCI Prize	FIPRESCI Award	Lebedyne Ozero - Zona (Swan Lake. The Zone)	1990	Yuriy Illienko
Award of the Youth at Cannes Film Festival	Foreign Film	Lebedyne Ozero - Zona (Swan Lake. The Zone)	1990	Yuriy Illienko

== Film dubbing or subtitling in Ukrainian ==
Film dubbing or subtitling in Ukrainian refers to the dubbing or subtitles of video products (movies, TV series, video games, etc.) in Ukrainian.

In 2010, one third of all films in Ukraine were Russian language subbed. In 2019, a law was passed by the Ukrainian parliament assuring that all movies have dubbing or subtitles in the Ukrainian language. In 2021, Netflix released their first feature film with Ukrainian dubbing. Only 11% of Ukrainians oppose dubbing in films.

=== Ukrainian dubbing actors ===
Since the founding of a Ukrainian dubbing in 2006 there were many recognizable voice actors dubbing Ukrainian, among which the most famous are Eugene Maluha (known as the voice of the Ukrainian Alfa from the same cult series) and Yuri Kovalenko (known as Ukrainian cheesecakes voice in the movie Cars - first full-length animated film-blockbuster, which was shown in Ukrainian cinemas with Ukrainian dubbing).

Ukrainian show business stars are also actively involved in dubbing in Ukrainian. A number of famous singers, including Oleg Skrypka and Ani Lorak, took part in the dubbing of the animated film Carlson, who lives on the roof (2002) . A number of celebrities worked on the cartoon Terkel and Khalepa (2004): Potap, Oleg Skrypka, Fahot and Fozzy (TNMK band), Foma (Mandry band), Vadim Krasnooky (Mad Heads band), Katya Chilly, Vitaliy Kozlovsky, Lilu, Vasya Gontarsky ("Vasya Club"), DJ Romeo and Stepan Kazanin (Quarter-95). In the cartoon Horton (2008) you can hear the voices of showmen Pavel Shilko (DJ Pasha) and Volodymyr Zelenskyy (Quarter-9); Zelenskyy himself contributed to the Ukrainian dubs of Paddington and Paddington 2 among other acting appearances prior to his presidential career. The main characters of the film "13th District: Ultimatum" (2009) in the Ukrainian box office spoke in the voices of Yevhen Koshov (Quarter-95) and Andriy Khlyvnyuk (soloist of the group "Boombox").

== Actors ==
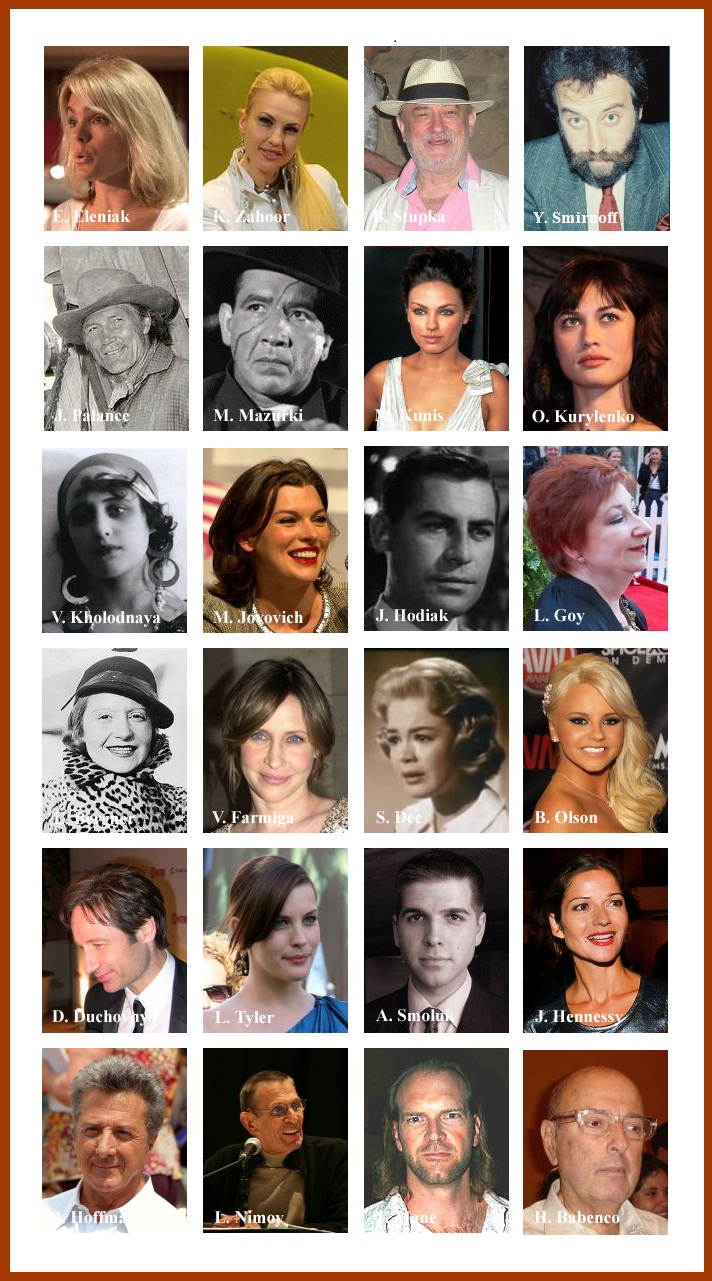
World famous actors and actresses related to Ukrainians or Ukraine

=== Ukrainian actors ===
- Fedir Stryhun (November 1, 1939)
- Bohdan Kozak (November 27, 1940 – May 28, 2024)
- Mykhailo Holubovych (November 27, 1940)
- Ivan Mykolaichuk (June 15, 1941 – August 3, 1987)
- Bohdan Stupka (August 27, 1941 – July 22, 2012)
- Rayisa Nedashkivska (February 17, 1943)
- Ivan Havryliuk (October 25, 1948)
- Serhiy Romaniuk (July 21, 1953 – May 3, 2019)
- Bohdan Beniuk (May 26, 1957)
- Ruslana Pysanka (November 17, 1965 – 19 July 2022)
- Taisia Povaliy (December 10, 1965)

=== Ukrainian diaspora actors ===
- Vera Kholodnaya (1893-1919)
- Gregory Hlady (December 4, 1954)
- David Vadim (March 28, 1972)
- Eugene Hütz (September 6, 1972)
- Vladimir Kozlov (April 27, 1972)
- Vera Farmiga (August 6, 1973)
- Milla Jovovich (December 17, 1975)
- Katheryn Winnick (December 17, 1977)
- Olga Kurylenko (November 14, 1979)
- Mila Kunis (August 14, 1983)

Immigrants from Ukraine were the parents or grandparents of Serge Gainsbourg, Leonard Nimoy, Vera Farmiga, Taissa Farmiga, Steven Spielberg, Dustin Hoffman, Sylvester Stallone, Kirk Douglas, Leonardo DiCaprio, Winona Ryder, Whoopi Goldberg, Edward Dmytryk, Lenny Kravitz and Zoë Kravitz, illusionist David Copperfield, animator Bill Tytla.

== Directors ==
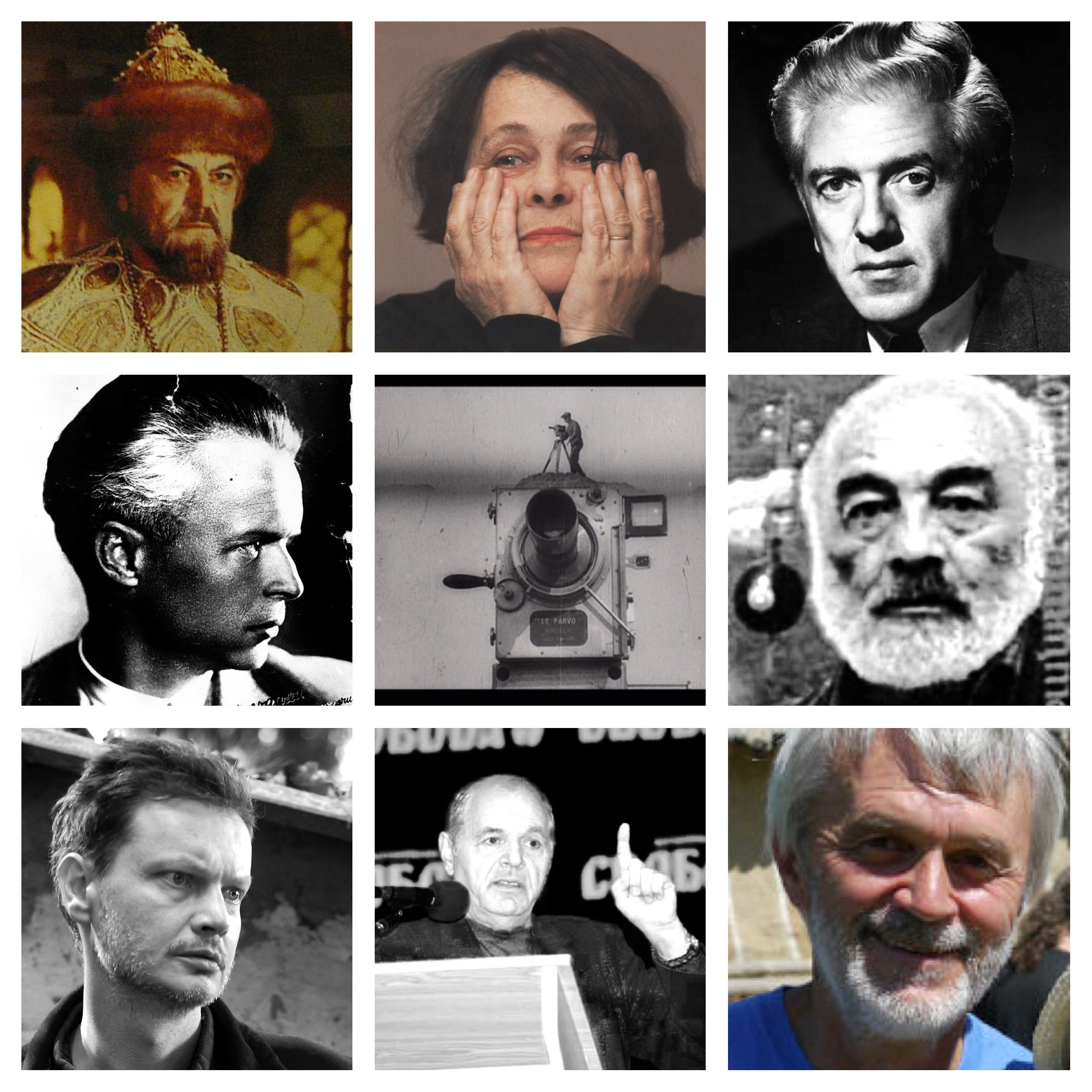
Serhii Bondarchuk, Kira Muratova, Anatole Litvak, Alexander Dovzhenko, Dziga Vertov, Sergei Parajanov, Ihor Podolchak, Yuri Ilyenko, Mykhailo Ilyenko

=== Ukrainian directors ===
- Alexander Dovzhenko (10 September [O.S. 29 August] 1894 – November 25, 1956)
- Viktor Ivchenko (November 4, 1912 — November 6, 1972)
- Leonid Bykov (December 12, 1928 – April 11, 1979)
- Mykola Mashchenko (January 2, 1929 — May 2, 2013)
- Vadym Illienko (July 3, 1932 — May 8, 2015)
- Yuri Ilyenko (July 16, 1936 - June 15, 2010)
- Leonid Osyka (March 8, 1940 - September 16, 2001)
- Mykhailo Illienko (June 29, 1947)
- Andriy Donchyk (September 11, 1961)
- Ihor Podolchak (April 9, 1962)
- Myroslav Slaboshpytskyi (October 17, 1974)
- Vyacheslav Krishtofovich
- Sergiy Masloboyschikov
- Maryna Vroda
- Tetiana Khodakivska (October 22, 1980)

=== Non-Ukrainian origin directors ===
- Dziga Vertov (2 January 1896 – 12 February 1954)
- Anatole Litvak (May 10, 1902 – December 15, 1974)
- Sergei Bondarchuk (September 25, 1920 – October 20, 1994)
- Grigory Chukhray (May 23, 1921 – October 28, 2001)
- Sergei Parajanov (January 9, 1924 – July 20, 1990)
- Kira Muratova (November 5, 1934)
- Larisa Shepitko (6 January 1938 – 2 June 1979)
- Roman Balayan (April 15, 1941)
- Sergei Loznitsa (September 5, 1964)

== See also ==
- List of cinema of the world
- National Oleksandr Dovzhenko Film Centre
- Ukrainian Association of Cinematographers
- Ukrainian poetic cinema
- Ukrainian Film Academy
- Golden Dzyga
- Ptakh Jung
- History of Ukrainian animation
- List of highest-grossing Ukrainian films
