= List of the 100 best films in the history of Ukrainian cinema =

The 100 best films in the history of Ukrainian cinema is a rating given from 1–100 to the best films in Ukrainian cinema. The films were selected in June 2021 by the National Oleksandr Dovzhenko Film Centre in Kyiv, Ukraine through a poll taken of representatives of the national and international film community.

== Partial list ==
1. Shadows of Forgotten Ancestors (1965), dir. Sergei Parajanov
2. Earth (1930), dir. Alexander Dovzhenko
3. Man with a Movie Camera (1929), dir. Dziga Vertov
4. The Tribe (2014), dir. Myroslav Slaboshpytskyi
5. The Stone Cross (1968), dir. Leonid Osyka
6. The Asthenic Syndrome (1989), dir. Kira Muratova
7. Flights in Dreams and Reality (1983), dir. Roman Balayan
8. The White Bird Marked with Black (1971), dir. Yuri Ilyenko
9. The Long Farewell (1971), dir. Kira Muratova
10. Babylon XX (1979), dir. Ivan Mykolaichuk

== See also ==
- List of highest-grossing Ukrainian films

== Sources ==
- TOP 100. Rating of the best films in the history of Ukrainian cinema
