= Ukrainian poetic cinema =

Genre of Ukrainian cinema

- Years active: 1964 to the late 1970s
- Location: Ukraine
- Major figures: Sergei Parajanov, Yuri Ilyenko, Borys Ivchenko, Ivan Mykolaichuk, Leonid Osyka
- Influences: Alexander Dovzhenko, Khrushchev Thaw, Soviet dissidents, Surrealist cinema, Ukrainian folklore
- Influenced: Cinema of Ukraine

Ukrainian poetic cinema (Ukrainian: Українське поетичне кіно, romanized: Ukrayinske poetychne kino) was a cinematic and cultural movement which emerged in the mid-20th century in reaction to Soviet nationality policy. It and other art movements emerged in the Soviet cinema industry in the mid-1960s with the release of the film Shadows of Forgotten Ancestors.

In contrast to Soviet realistic cinema, Ukrainian poetic cinema focused on visual expressiveness, surreal and ethnographic motifs. It was influenced by Ukrainian folklore and early works of Alexander Dovzhenko.

The development of Ukrainian poetic cinema provoked another wave of repression of the Soviet ideological machine against Ukrainian cinema, national consciousness and non-traditional artistic search. Many films of this movement were banned in the USSR due to ideological censorship, and released only in the late 1980s and early 1990s.

The term "Ukrainian poetic cinema" is attributed to Polish movie critic Janusz Gazda, who proposed it in 1970.

== Films ==
Ukrainian poetic cinema includes ten feature films made in the 1960s and 1970s. They are:

- Shadows of Forgotten Ancestors (1964) by Sergei Parajanov;
- The Stone Cross (1968) and Zakhar Berkout (1971) by Leonid Osyka;
- The White Bird Marked with Black (1971) by Yuri Ilyenko;
- Conscience (1968) by Volodymyr Denysenko;
- Comissars (1971) by Mykola Mashchenko;
- The Lost Letter (1972) by Borys Ivchenko.
