= Tetiana Khodakivska =

Ukrainian film director (born 1980)

- Born: October 22, 1980 (age 45); Kyiv, Ukraine
- Occupation: film director

Tetiana Khodakivska (born October 22, 1980) is a Ukrainian film director currently based in New York; a member of the European Film Academy, the Ukrainian Film Academy, the Ukrainian Guild of Directors, and the Ukrainian documentary filmmakers' association Babylon'13. Tetiana is a laureate of the Chicago International Film Festival (Gold Plaque) and Ukrainian Film Academy Award "Golden Dzyga". Among Ms. Khodakivska's academic experience are editing master-classes Ukrainian Guild of Directors and lectures in the Harriman Institute of the Columbia University

Tetiana is the director of the mini-series “Angels of War,” which follows the stories of siblings during the Second World War. The film received the Gold Plaque at the Chicago International Film Festival. Among her other projects is a cinéma vérité documentary about mortality “Enticing, Sugary, Boundless or Song and Dances about Life” that was nominated as best documentary at the Ukrainian Film Academy Awards.

== Biography ==
Tetiana (Tania) Khodakivska was born on October 22, 1980, in Kyiv, Ukraine, where she later completed her studies in journalism.

Since 2010, Tetiana Khodakivska began specializing in films with visual effects, computer animation, and the use of cutting-edge technologies. She has been living and working in New York since 2015, where she started her career with a documentary project for the United Nations.

In 2016 Tetiana directed a documentary "Enticing, Sugary, Boundless or Songs and Dances about Death". The world premiere of the film took place on October 27, 2017, at the Jihlava International Documentary Film Festival. The Ukrainian premiere of the film happened at the Docudays UA, where the film received two special acknowledgments:

- "With its blissful cinematic moments and unexpected constellations (fingers and fabrics, gestures and cultural landscapes), this universal film about death (and what follows) impressed us with its craftsmanship. It moved us with its calm thirst for life."
- "For the audacity of an experiment without boundaries and a journey without limits."

The film was nominated for the Ukrainian Film Academy Award "Golden Dzyga" as the "Best Documentary Film".

In 2020, along with Volodymyr Zapriahalov, she became a laureate of the "Golden Dzyga" film award in the "Best Editing" category for the film "Foxter & Max".

In December 2020, Tetiana Khodakivska was elected to the Council of the Ukrainian Guild of Directors. In May 2021, she became a member of the European Film Academy.

In 2022, she was the author and co-curator of the exhibition "Hi-Resolution: Ukrainian Culture and Contemporary Art Now!" in New York — at the James Gallery of the CUNY Graduate Center. The exhibition showcased 51 works by 40 Ukrainian artists (from the late 1980s to 2022). The co-curators of the exhibition were artists Oleksiy Sai and Mykyta Kadan, along with curators Ksenia Malikh, Kateryna Karl (James Gallery), and Inga Lais (Museum of Modern Art).

During the same year, Tetiana presented Ukrainian artists at the event "Art During War," organized by the Harriman Institute of the Columbia University.

== Awards ==
- Chicago International Film Festival (Gold Plaque)
- Calcutta International Cult Film Festival (Best Directing)
- US Unternational Film and Video festival (Silver screen)
- 2018 — Nomination for the Ukrainian Film Academy Award "Golden Dzyga" in the "Best Documentary Film" category for the film "Enticing, Sugary, Boundless, or Songs and Dances About Death"
- 2020 —Ukrainian Film Academy Award "Golden Dzyga" in the "Best Editing" category for the film "Foxter and Max"
