= List of highest-grossing Ukrainian films =

This list charts the most successful Ukrainian films screened at cinemas in Ukraine and overseas. Revenue is shown in US dollars, not taking inflation into account.

== List ==
#	Title		Year	Budget, $	Revenue, $	Audience in Ukraine
#	English	Original	Year	Budget, $	Revenue, $	Audience in Ukraine
1	Crazy Wedding	Ukrainian: Скажене весілля, romanized: Skazhene vesillia	2018	400000	1966105	657672
2	Crazy Wedding 2	Ukrainian: Скажене весілля 2, romanized: Skazhene vesillia 2	2019	600000	1661672	444262
3	Crazy Wedding 3	Ukrainian: Скажене весілля 3, romanized: Skazhene vesillia 3	2021	570000	1035338	300015
4	Just Sex, Nothing Personal	Ukrainian: Секс і нічого особистого, romanized: Seks i nichoho osobystoho	2018	1000000	956170	261787
5	The Guide	Ukrainian: Поводир, romanized: Povodyr	2014	2000000	905985	362422
6	Cyborgs	Ukrainian: Кіборги, romanized: Kiborhy	2017	1800000	884894	326177
7	Svingers	Ukrainian: Свінгери, romanized: Svinhery	2018	100000	850000	276805
8	DZIDZIO Kontrabas	Ukrainian: Дзідзьо Контрабас, romanized: Dzidzio Kontrabas	2017	200000	822880	311157
9	DZIDZIO First time	Ukrainian: Дзідзьо Перший раз, romanized: Dzidzio Pershyi raz	2018	750000	813000	273369
10	The Stronghold	Ukrainian: Сторожова застава, romanized: Storozhova zastava	2017	1600000	720000	276018
11	Shadows of unforgotten ancestors	Ukrainian: Тіні незабутих предків, romanized: Tini nezabutykh predkiv	2013	350000	644000	147424
12	My Thoughts Are Silent	Ukrainian: Мої думки тихі, romanized: Moi dumky tykhi	2019	370000	398211	109264
13	Hellish Horughva or Cossack's Christmas	Ukrainian: Пекельна Хоругва, або Різдво Козацьке, romanized: Pekelna Khoruhva, abo Rizdvo Kozatske	2019	1300000	391703	117166
14	Our Kitties	Ukrainian: Наші котики, romanized: Nashi kotyky	2020	1690000	350515	100949
15	The Adventures of S Mykolai	Ukrainian: Пригоди S Миколая, romanized: Pryhody S Mykolaia	2018	1400000	316210	104628
16	Easy	Ukrainian: Ізі, romanized: Izi	2017	1100000	315081	19242
17	Zustrich odnoklassnykiv	Зустріч однокласників	2019	220000	307242	92459
18	Kruty 1918	Крути 1918	2019	2000000	269622	97706
19	Viddana	Віддана	2020	2400000	251997	71769
20	The Tribe	Ukrainian: Плем'я, romanized: Plemia	2014	1750000	236000	7803
21	11 children from Morshyn	Ukrainian: 11 дітей з Моршина, romanized: 11 ditei z Morshyna	2019	550000	210664	73708
22	Babay	Бабай	2014	100 000	208000	58108
23	Infoholic	Ukrainian: Інфоголік, romanized: Infoholik	2017	100000	189471	70498
24	Selfie Party	Ukrainian: Селфі Паті, romanized: Selfi Pati	2016	85000	183265	75493
25	Firecrosser	Ukrainian: Той, хто пройшов крізь вогонь, romanized: Toi, khto proishov kriz vohon	2011	2000000	174289	56581
26	Black raven	Ukrainian: Чорний ворон, romanized: Chornyi voron	2019	1030000	168543	50102
27	Gallery	Ukrainian: Штольня, romanized: Shtolnia	2006	50000	120000	N/A
28	Escape from Stalin's Death Camp	Ukrainian: Червоний, romanized: Chervonyi	2017	778000	115640	46800
29	Produsser	Ukrainian: Продюсер, romanized: Prodiuser	2019	N/A	108739	31910
30	Ivan Sila	Іван Сила	2013	1900000	100000	N/A
31	Ex	Ukrainian: Екс, romanized: Eks	2020	1030000	18568	5820
32	Only a Miracle	Ukrainian: Тільки диво, romanized: Tilky dyvo	2019	2300000	N/A	N/A

== See also ==
- The First Code
