= Kyiv International Short Film Festival =

- Location: Kyiv, Ukraine
- Founded: 2012
- Festival date: April
- Website: www.kisff.org

The Kyiv International Short Film Festival (abbr. KISFF, Ukrainian: Київський міжнародний фестиваль короткометражних фільмів) is an annual festival held in Kyiv and aimed at acquainting audiences with international short films. Latest movies, winners of international festivals, retrospectives of extraordinary figures and special attention to modern and classic Ukrainian movies all feature in the festival. KISFF also organizes projects and events to develop a diversity of short films in Ukraine.

The indie film Kissing Hank's Ass was screened at the festival in 2015

== History ==
The work on the Kyiv International Short Film Festival started in 2011 and it was held in spring 2012 for the first time. Since then, it takes place annually under any circumstances. The festival is an independent, non-profit, non-governmental organization, with its main aim being to promote short films.

== Mission ==
The festival's mission is an attempt to discover new forms and methods of film production in Ukraine and abroad, by developing national and international platforms for short films. The program also includes other screenings, classes, and meetings.

== Past winners ==
The 2020 winner was a film Huntsville Station. Throughout the film the audience is able to explore the concept of freedom and how it feels to be released after years of imprisonment. Shot from a distance, the viewer is able to observe a group of inmates waiting for a bus after being released from a penitentiary, and how they react to finally being free.

A special mention went to the film Stay awake, Be ready that takes the viewer on an exciting yet trivial night out in Vietnam.

The film How to Disappear also received a special mention, shot from the perspective of a first-person shooter game. The film explored the theme of deserting whilst in a video game and was described by the jury as "humorous, surprisingly poetic and intelligent ode to deserters".

The winner of the Ukrainian competition in 2020 went to The Carpet by Natasha Kyselova for her beautiful cinematography capturing a teenage boy's coming-of-age moments of burgeoning love and friendships tested, set against the increasingly tense back-drop of escalating war.

A special mention was awarded to Metawork, created by Vasyl Lyah, "for the director's artistic vision and highly promising independent voice" His film depicted a young man tending to his garden, his creativity and care becoming a political act of survival and resistance in modern-day Ukraine.

== Jury ==
The festival jury is elected by administration of the festival. Usually there are several foreign guests and representatives of Ukrainian cinema. The jury members are prominent directors, producers and filmmakers that have received international awards.

== Regulations ==
According to the regulations, films whose language is not Ukrainian, English or Russian must have English subtitles.

By submitting the film, the person is solely responsible for the film's observance of all necessary rights.

== Competition program ==
The competition program consists of International and National programs.

== Awards ==
The jury of the competition will present awards in three categories: Best Film, Best Director, Audience Award. In addition, the jury may award a ‘Jury Special Mention’.

== International Competition Winner 2020 ==
International winners
Category	Film	Director	Country	IMDb
Grand Prix	Huntsville Station	Chris Filippone Jamie Meltzer	United States	7,6/10
Special Mention	Stay Awake, Be Ready	Thien An Pham	Vietnam	6,9/10
Special Mention	How to Disappear	Robin Klengel Leonhard Müllner Michael Stumpf	Austria	6,3/10

== National Competition Winner 2020 ==
National winners
Category	Film	Director	IMDb
Grand Prix	The Carpet	Natalia Kyselova	No rating available
Special Mention	Metawork	Vasyl Lyah	No rating available
Audience award	Surrogate	Stas Santimov	No rating available

== Russia-Ukraine War ==
In the wake of the 2022 Russian invasion of Ukraine, which escalated the Russo-Ukraine War, the Kyiv Short Film Festival requested that foreign cities screen Ukrainian short films to introduce European culture (especially Ukrainian culture) and raise funds for humanitarian assistance during the war. It also called on a cultural boycott of Russian films due to Russia's aggressive, imperialist activity.
