= Babylon XX =

1979 Soviet Ukrainian film

- Russian-language release poster
- Directed by: Ivan Mykolaichuk
- Written by: Vasyl Zemliak; Ivan Mykolaichuk
- Starring: Ivan Mykolaichuk; Lyubov Polishchuk
- Cinematography: Yuriy Harmash
- Production company: Dovzhenko Film Studios
- Release date: 1979
- Running time: 100 minutes
- Country: Soviet Union
- Languages: Ukrainian, Russian

Babylon XX (Note: In this instance, "XX" is used as a form of referring to years in Roman numerals.) (Ukrainian: «Вавилон XX», romanized: Vavylon XX; Russian: «Вавилон XX», romanized: Vavilon XX) is a 1979 Ukrainian film of Dovzhenko Film Studios directed by Ivan Mykolaichuk in his directorial debut and starring an ensemble cast including Mykolaichuk, Lyubov Polishchuk, and Les Serdyuk as peasants struggling to adapt to life within a commune led by Soviet sailor Klym Synytsia (played by Ivan Havryliuk). It is a loose film adaptation of the 1971 novel A Flock of Swans by Vasyl Zemliak, and depicts collectivization in the Ukrainian Soviet Socialist Republic and the transition from capitalism to communism in Ukraine.

Babylon XX had a troubled production history, with both a part-time film crew and a backdrop of Soviet repressions on Ukrainian freedom of expression; Ukrainian poetic cinema, the movement to which Babylon XX belonged, was formally banned, and A Flock of Swans itself had been threatened to be banned. The film's production took two years before premiering at the 1979 Kyiv International Film Festival "Molodist" to critical acclaim, being awarded the festival's main prize. Since its release, the film has come to be seen as one of the greatest Ukrainian films of all time. It is tenth on the list of the 100 best films in the history of Ukrainian cinema created by the National Oleksandr Dovzhenko Film Centre, and has been described as a classic of Ukrainian poetic cinema by the Ukrainian State Film Agency.

== Plot ==
In the early 1920s in Podolia, the village of Babylon has come under the government of the Ukrainian Soviet Socialist Republic, but life has not significantly changed from the times of the Russian Empire. However, upheaval begins when Red Navy sailor and Babylon native Klym Synytsia (Note: Ukrainian: Клим Синиця) (Ivan Havryliuk) arrives in the village, seeking to build communism and establish a commune. Noticing the amateur statues of deposed Tsar Nicholas II and his family, Synytsia destroys them with grenades, proclaiming "Polundra!" (Note: Ukrainian: Полундра) (the battle cry of the Soviet marines) as he does so.

After these events, Babylon's gravedigger and local "philosopher" Fabian (Note: Ukrainian: Фабіан) (Mykolaichuk) returns to Babylon. Meanwhile, brothers Danko (Note: Ukrainian: Данко) (Les Serdyuk) and Lukian (Note: Ukrainian: Лукян) (Yaroslav Havryliuk) are both planning their respective marriages, and entrust a local orphan, Darynka (Note: Ukrainian: Даринка) (Liudmyla Chynsheva) as a caretaker for their sickly and elderly mother. While working, Darynka notices the wealthy Bubela collecting weapons in an effort to kill Synytsia, fearful that his wealth will be confiscated by the Soviet government, and tells Danko and Lukian.

Danko courts Malva (Note: Ukrainian: Мальва) (Lyubov Polishchuk), who loves Fabian. Fabian himself has no romantic feelings for Malva, fearing for his sanity. Malva visits Synytsia's former manor estate, where he lives, in an effort to join the commune, but is rejected by Synytsia due to his distrust of her. He sends Malva home with the poet Volodia Yavorskyi (Note: Ukrainian: Володя Яворський), a sight which leaves Danko jealous and hungry for revenge. Malva, meanwhile, remains committed to joining the commune. Soon after, Danko and Lukian's mother dies, and an elaborate funeral is held for her. It is revealed that a treasure is buried under a pear tree in Babylon, and, after the funeral, the brothers dig up the treasure, revealing Cossack weapons. Malva and Yavorskyi become romantically involved, until Bubela and his kulak militia kills him. However, by that time, Malva is already pregnant with Yavorskyi's child.

On the eve of Bubela's attempt to kill Synytsia, he orders his own grave from Fabian. On the night of Epiphany, the kulaks capture the communists, and the clash soon spreads throughout Babylon. Danko joins the kulaks, while Lukian joins the communists. Bubela incites the peasants into a riot, which Fabian tries to bring under control. In spite of his efforts, however, a fight breaks out, and the kulaks flee after being defeated. Taking the opportunity to kill Malva, Danko attempts to shoot her, but instead hits Fabian.

== Cast ==
- Ivan Mykolaichuk as Fabian
- Lyubov Polishchuk as Malva
- Les Serdyuk as Danko
- Yaroslav Havryliuk as Lukian
- Tayisia Lytvynenko as Prisia
- Boryslav Brondukov as Yavtushok
- Liudmyla Chynsheva as Darynka
- Anatoliy Khostikoiev as Volodia Yavorskyi, the poet
- Ivan Havryliuk as Klym Synytsia
- Vitaliy Rozstalnyi as Ruban
- Konstantin Stepankov as Bubela, the rich man
- Olha Mateshko as Parfena
- Volodymyr Volkov as one of the Radenkiy brothers
- Valentyn Hrudynin as one of the Radenkiy brothers
- Rayisa Nedashkivska as Ruzia
- Boris Ivchenko as Chernets

== Production ==
Screenwriting for Babylon XX began in 1977, including both Vasyl Zemliak (author of A Flock of Swans, which Babylon XX was inspired by) and Ivan Mykolaichuk. The process of screenwriting was based on a nativity scene, with separate parts of the script representing high and low culture. Further inspiration on directorial and camera work was taken from the works of Croatian naïve art painter Ivan Generalić. The cast was primarily selected from among Mykolaichuk's personal friends, with the role of Malva remaining unfilled until Lyubov Polishchuk was chosen in her first feature film role. Mykolaichuk allowed improvisation and looser interpretations of the script, so as to give more of a natural feeling to the film.

Production was significantly hampered by the fact that many of the film's actors were also working in other roles while filming. Difficulty was also found in shooting night-time scenes, an issue resolved by cinematographer Yuriy Harmash with the usage of infrared photography. More generally posing a threat to the film's production was a crackdown on Ukrainian poetic cinema by the government of the Ukrainian Soviet Socialist Republic. Actor Boris Ivchenko remarked in a later interview "By what miracle was it that Babylon XX was allowed?", and according to public broadcaster Suspilne Kultura, the film's continued production came into question on a daily basis due to government efforts to crack down on poetic cinema and other displays of Ukrainian national identity.

Other, more minor incidents occurred during production. On one occasion, during the digging of a grave for one scene, the remains of a Cossack were discovered by Harmash, who said, "God will forgive us, but the Cossack even moreso."

== Release ==
Babylon XX was first released at the Kyiv International Film Festival "Molodist" in 1979, and found critical acclaim among the audience, being awarded the main award. Despite the positive response, Mykolaichuk remained hesitant about the film's future, and kept a taped copy of the film locked in a safe until 1980. That year, Babylon XX was screened at the All-Union Film Festival with Russian dubbing, and Mykolaichuk was awarded the festival's prize for directorial work. The same year, it had its first international screening at the Locarno Festival, where it failed to win any awards but attracted significant attention.

In 2011, the film was digitally restored by the National Oleksandr Dovzhenko Film Centre. Ten years later, in 2021, the film was once again displayed at Molodist, marking the 80th anniversary of Mykolaichuk's birth. Screenings took place in Dnipro, Kharkiv, Kyiv, Lviv, Odesa, Sumy, and Uzhhorod on 9 December 2021.

== Legacy ==
Babylon XX has been described by the Ukrainian State Film Agency as a classic of Ukrainian poetic cinema and as the more successful of Mykolaichuk's directorial works. It is ranked as tenth on the list of the 100 best films in the history of Ukrainian cinema compiled by the National Oleksandr Dovzhenko Film Centre.

Since the Declaration of Independence of Ukraine, Babylon XX has acquired a more significant stature in the realm of Ukrainian culture, growing to the status of a cult classic. The films Accompanying and When the Trees Fall both take inspiration from the film, with the former using the more linguistic and passionate elements of the film and the latter following a similar style of poetic cinema. Numerous other cultural works have been named after Babylon XX. Ukrainian hip-hop group TNMK's 2004 album Fires of the City of Babylon was named after the film, as was the documentary film group Babylon'13.
