= Les Serdyuk =

Ukrainian actor (1940–2010)

People's Artist Les Serdyuk
- Лесь Сердюк
- Serdyuk in 2008
- Born: 14 October 1940; Kharkiv, Ukrainian SSR, Soviet Union
- Died: 26 May 2010 (aged 69); Kyiv, Ukraine
- Occupation: Actor
- Years active: 1953–2010
- Spouse: Irina Bunina
- Children: 2

Oleksandr Oleksandrovych Serdyuk (Ukrainian: Олександр Олександрович Сердюк), also known as Les Serdyuk (Лесь Сердюк; 14 October 1940 – 26 May 2010), was a Soviet and Ukrainian theater and film actor. He received the title of People's Artist of Ukraine (1996).

== Biography ==
Born into a family of People's Artist of the USSR Aleksandr Ivanovich Serdyuk. In 1961 he graduated from Kharkiv National Kotlyarevsky University of Arts.

From 1961 to 1964, he was an actor of the Taras Shevchenko Kharkiv Academic Ukrainian Drama Theatre. He was subsequently an actor at the Riga Youth Theatre for an additional two years before joining the Lesya Ukrainka National Academic Theater of Russian Drama. In 1970, he began working with Dovzhenko Film Studios.

In 2008, after a 37-year break, he returned to the stage as part of the troupe of the Ivan Franko National Academic Drama Theater.

== Death ==
He died on May 26, 2010, at the age of 69 in Kyiv due to lung cancer, which was diagnosed in the actor in the spring of 2009. He underwent chemotherapy treatment in Kyiv, but it was unsuccessful. He was buried on May 28 at Baikove Cemetery.

== Selected filmography ==
- 1954: Marina's Destiny as Gnat Petrovich Podkova
- 1968: In the Kyiv area as Mykhailo Burmystenko
- 1968: The Experiment of Dr. Abst as Bruno
- 1970: Sespel as episode
- 1972: Criminal Investigation Inspector as Aleksei Mikhailovich Sharun
- 1972: Night Rider as Savchenko
- 1972: Lavri as Tokovoy
- 1978: Zestoke godine as Latyshev
- 1979: Babylon XX as Danko
- 1981: Such Late, Such Warm Autumn as Melety / Ivan Meletyevich
- 1984: The Legend of Princess Olga as Prince Sviatoslav I
- 1988: The Mountains are Smoking (TV Movie) as Martin Pogodnyak
- 1989: Seromanets as Vasily Chepizhny
- 1991: The First Рrinter Revelation as Garaburda
- 1995: Stracheni svitanki as episode
- 1997: Roksolana as Kasim Pasha
- 2002: A Prayer for Hetman Mazepa as Ivan Samoylovych
- 2009: Taras Bulba as Dmytro
