= E.A. — Extraordinary Accident =

1958 crime action film

- Directed by: Viktor Ivchenko
- Written by: Vitali Kalinin; Grigori Koltunov; Dmitri Kuznetsov
- Starring: Mikhail Kuznetsov; Aleksandr Anurov; Vyacheslav Tikhonov; Taisia Litvinenko; Anatoly Solovyev; Giuli Chokhonelidze
- Cinematography: Aleksey Prokopenko
- Music by: Ihor Shamo
- Production companies: Gorky Film Studio; Dovzhenko Film Studios
- Release date: 1958
- Running time: 170 minutes
- Country: Soviet Union
- Language: Russian

E.A. — Extraordinary Accident (Russian: «Ч.П. — Чрезвычайное происшествие», romanized: Ch.P. - Chrezvychainoe proisshestvie) is a 1958 Soviet crime action film directed by Viktor Ivchenko. It was the box office leader of 1959 in the Soviet Union, having had more than 47 million viewers. The film is based on real events of the capture of the Soviet tanker "Tuapse" on 23 June 1954.

== Plot ==
The film is set in 1954. Soviet tanker "Poltava" traveling with kerosene to China, is captured by the Kuomintang. Additionally the motorist Raiskiy is accused of accidentally killing one of the soldiers (it turns out later that he is still alive), and under this pretext, the Kuomintang begin to look for the "killer", using this incident as one of the reasons for the ship's detention. The tanker with crew is delivered to Taiwan, where they are persuaded to voluntarily go over to the "genuine freedom and democracy", and are treated exceptionally well: they are housed in a luxurious villa, given food and drink. When persuasion does not work on them, they start using very different measures: a concentration camp and oppression. Heroic adventures follow. Some return home after a few months, others only through many years, and some do not come back at all. The story is told from the viewpoint of the captain's first mate of educational work (played by Mikhail Kuznetsov).

== Cast ==
- Mikhail Kuznetsov — Anton Kovalenko
- Alexander Anurov — Leonid Kalugin
- Vyacheslav Tikhonov — Victor Rayskiy
- Taisiya Litvinenko — Rita Voronkovа
- Anatoly Solovyov Grachev
- Giuli Chokhonelidze — Javakheti
- Dmitri Kapka — Kharitonenko
- Vladimir Rudin — Ivan Frolov
- Yuri Sarychev
- Paul Usovnichenko — Nikolai Sakharov
- Vladimir Dalsky — Fang
- Vladimir Uan-Zo-Li — Gao
- Alexander Tolstoy — Doronin
- Valery Zinoviev
- Boris Ivchenko
- Eugene Baliev - Sokolov
- Witold Yanpavlis
- Alexander Barushnoy — French Ambassador
- Vladimir Volchik — American officer

== Awards ==
- First prize for art direction (M. Yuferov)
- Second Prize for direction of the film (V. Ivchenko) TCF-59 in Kyiv.

== See also ==
- Capture of Tanker Tuapse
