= The Troubled Month of Veresen =

- Directed by: Leonid Osyka
- Written by: Viktor Smirnov
- Starring: Viktor Fokin; Borislav Brondukov; Ivan Mikolajchuk; Antonina Leftiy; Irina Bunina; Fedir Panasenko
- Production company: Dovzhenko Film Studios
- Release date: 1977
- Country: Soviet Union
- Language: Russian

The Troubled Month of Veresen (Russian: «Тревожный месяц вересень», romanized: Trevozhnyy mesyats vieriesien, Ukrainian: «Тривожний місяць вересень», romanized: Tryvozhnyi misyats veresen) is a 1977 Soviet war drama directed by Leonid Osyka.

== See also ==
- Zakhar Berkut (1971) - other works of Leonid Osyka
- Kaminnyi khrest (1968)
