= Joseph Timchenko =

Ukrainian inventor (1852–1924)

Joseph Tymchenko
- Йосип Тимченко
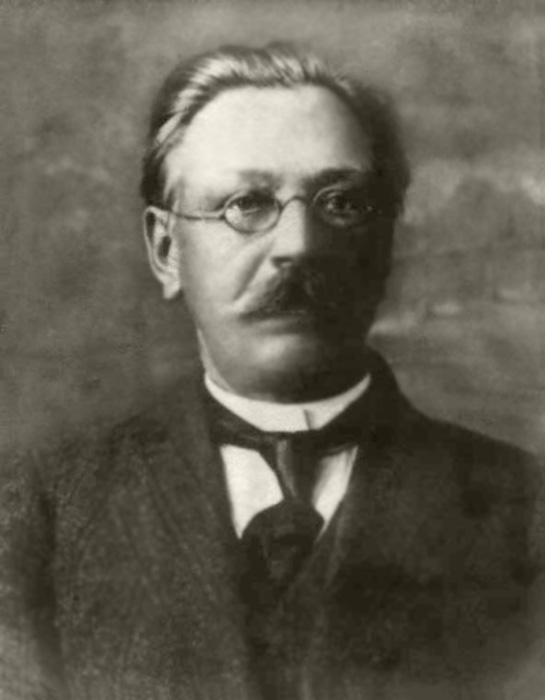
- Born: 26 April 1852; Okip, Kharkiv Governorate, Russian Empire
- Died: 20 May 1924 (aged 72)
- Occupation: Inventor

Joseph Andriyovych Tymchenko (Ukrainian: Йосип Андрійович Тимченко; 26 April 1852 – 20 May 1924) was a Ukrainian inventor and mechanic. He is best known for his invention of a type of film camera in 1893, which was a predecessor to the inventions of Auguste and Louis Lumière in 1895.

Timchenko was born into a serf peasant family in the Kharkiv Governorate of the Russian Empire, where he worked at the mechanical workshop of Kharkiv University until 1874, when he moved to the city of Odesa. He then worked for much of his career as a mechanic at Odesa University, where he developed a wide range of inventions, including pressure-testing devices, railway electrical signals, and underwater mines. In the summer of 1893, he constructed a prototype film camera, later known as the "Tymchenko snail", and on 9 January 1894 gave one of the earliest public demonstrations of projected moving pictures at the Ninth Congress of Natural Scientists and Physicians of the Russian Empire in Moscow. Despite receiving numerous awards throughout his career, Timchenko's workshop at the Odesa University was destroyed in 1920, and he died in poverty in 1924, receiving little recognition for his inventions during his lifetime.

== Early life ==
Tymchenko was born on 26 April 1852 in the village of Okip, Kharkiv Governorate, Russian Empire on the estate of the landowner Khotentsev. He was born into a serf peasant family, and later attended the local church parish school. He was then sent to the city of Kharkiv at the age of fourteen for further learning, and his maternal uncle, Glazunov, who was a clerk in a bookstore managed to secure Joseph a spot be an apprentice to Alexander Edelberg in the mechanical institution of Kharkiv University. Edelberg owned both an optical shop and the workshop, and permitted Joseph to attend university lectures on physics and natural sciences while at the workshop.

== Move to Odesa ==
After several years in Kharkiv, he moved to Odesa in 1874. His motives to leave to Odesa later became a legend, with some saying he was inspired by the travels of Nicholas Miklouho-Maclay, and that Timchenko was allegedly trying to sail to Oceania to found a Russian colony based on social justice. However, the group disbanded shortly after in Odesa for unknown reasons, leaving Timchenko stranded. This version is more than likely false and was popularized in 1946 by A.Y. Kats as an ideological alternative during the Soviet era, since according to Timchenko's own manuscripts from 1874 he became influenced by a student named Yanovsky and the writing of Gustav Engar, and thus wanted to establish instead a Russian colony in the Americas. After arriving in Odesa in April 1874, Yanovsky vanished with the group's collective savings, and while most of the group that was going to go there wanted to return to Kharkiv, Timchenko chose to stay in Odesa and start over. Upon arriving in the city, he worked as a day laborer for 99 kopeks a day. He later secured a job at the Society of Steamship Navigation and Trade until 1880. His first invention was in 1875, when he invented a device for testing the pressure gauges of steam boilers in order not to have to send them to Scotland for testing. He then developed electrical signals for railways, and during the Russo-Turkish War designed advanced impact and electric underwater mines for the defense of Odesa.

== Odesa University and inventions ==
In February 1880, the position of "Mechanic of the University" opened up at Odesa University following the death of M.F. Kulikov, and shortly after, Timchenko was hired to the job. In 1884, he decided to personally front 15,000 rubles to build a modern facility instead of the workshop, which was approved and granted him exclusive use of the workshop for a decade. In 1888, he was promoted by the rector of the university, Yaroshenko, and with a decree by Emperor Alexander III to an official "state service" status, meaning he was not longer part of the "petty bourgeois" class and was now a Collegiate Registrar, and he and his family were granted the status of "Honorary Citizens". During this time, he supported A.V. Klossowski in establishing a massive meteorological network across Southwest Russia. His next big project was in 1890 when he developed a large-scale project for heating and supplying therapeutic muds at the Kuyalnik resort near Odesa.

He started inventing in cinema in the summer of 1893, when he worked to construct a prototype motion-picture camera known as the "Tymchenko snail". It was made on the commission of Moscow professor and physicist Mykola Oleksiyovych Lyubimov, who worked with Timchenko to develop it. The camera was used to film subjects at a racetrack, with the films being entitled The Horseman and The Spear-Thrower. He first started conducting public demonstrations of the two films at the Frantsiya Hotel in Odesa. He later improved upon this design, and on 9 January 1894, demonstrated projected moving pictures at the Ninth Congress of Natural Scientists and Physicians of the Russian Empire in Moscow, with the apparatus being approved but not patented. However, he would never receive fame for his invention afterward, and in 1909 was dismissed by the university administration to convert the workshop into a plague laboratory.

He was permitted to briefly return to Odesa University during World War I, where he constructed a machine that produced cartridges for the war, but in 1920, when the now Soviet authorities dissolved Odesa University, his workshop was not returned. He died in poverty on 20 May 1924. He was buried at the Second Christian Cemetery in Odesa, where there now stands a monument of black labradorite bearing the inscription "Here rests the inventor of the world's first motion-picture apparatus, Iosyp Andriiovych Tymchenko".

== Legacy ==
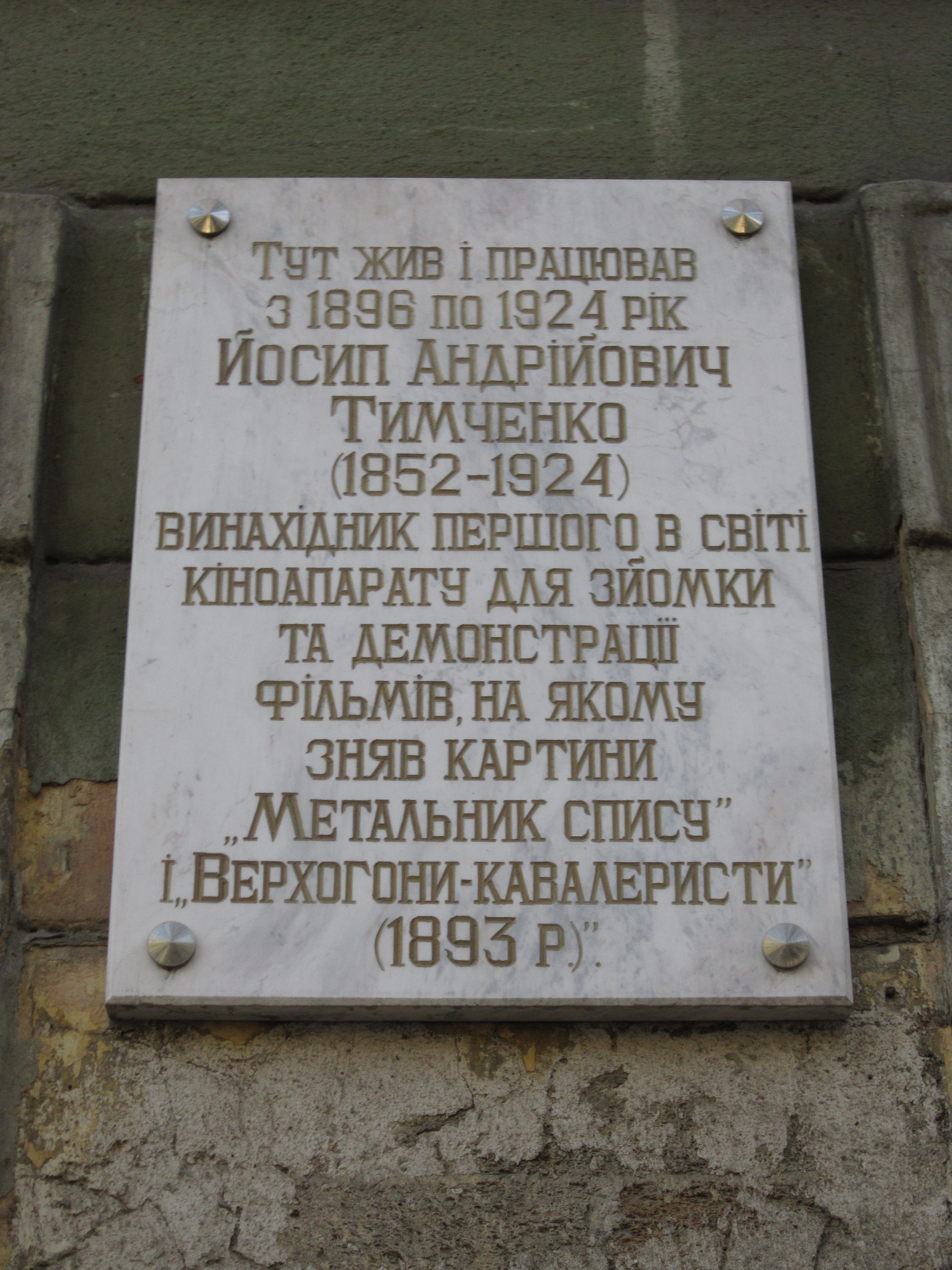
A memorial plaque at 20/24 Preobrazhenska Street in Odesa, which was the home Timchenko lived in with his family in Odesa.

In May 2012, a memorial plaque in Kharkiv was unveiled in his honor as part of the 4th International Film Festival "Kharkiv Lilac". It was installed on the building at 10/12 Moskovskyi Avenue, which housed the mechanical workshop of Kharkiv University that he worked at during his youth. A street in Odesa was named in his honor in 2016.

== Recognition and awards ==
- 1882 – Silver medal at the 15th All-Russian Industrial and Art Exhibition in Moscow;
- 1884 – Gold medal at the Agricultural and Factory Exhibition in Odesa;
- 1886 – Gold medal at the Bessarabian Exhibition of Agriculture and Industry in Chișinău;
- 1889 – Silver medal at the Exposition Universelle;
- 1896 – Gold medal at the 16th All-Russian Industrial and Art Exhibition in Nizhny Novgorod;
- 1900 – Knight of the Order of St. Stanislaus, 3rd class;
- 1900 – Gold medal at the Exposition Universelle;
- 1902 – Gold medal and 1st prize at the International Fisheries Exhibition in St. Petersburg;
- 1910 – Silver medal at the Art and Industrial Exhibition in Odesa.
