= Daniel Sakhnenko =

Soviet film director (1875–1930)

Daniel Fyodorovich Sakhnenko (1875–1930) — was a Ukrainian filmmaker and director.

== Early life and career ==
Sakhnenko was born near Dnipro, Ukraine. He was a film mechanic and engineer as well as a filmmaker.

He shot his first film in 1908, a documentary about the cholera epidemic in Dnipro, then known as Yekaterinoslav. In 1911, Sakhnenko shot his first feature-length film - Zaporozhian Sich (Ukrainian: Запорозька січ) - in Лоцманська Кам'янка, a village south-east of Dnipro. This is considered the first full-length Ukrainian film. That year he also co-founded the first Ukrainian film company, Sakhnenko, Schetinin and Co.

During World War One, Sakhnenko shot propaganda films for the state, and during the Russian Civil War, he was an army film operator.

From 1921, he worked at the Dnipro branch of the State Committee for Cinematography, and from 1925 he worked in the All-Ukrainian Photo Cinema Administration in Kharkiv.
