= Sluttish (1961 film) =

Soviet Union film

- Russian: Гулящая
- Directed by: Ivan Kavaleridze
- Written by: Grigory Baklanov
- Produced by: Aleksey Yarmolski
- Starring: Lyudmila Gurchenko; Rita Gladunko; Stepan Shkurat; Anna Nikolayeva; Nikolai Kozlenko
- Cinematography: Vladimir Vojtenko
- Music by: Boris Lyatoshinsky
- Production company: Dovzhenko Film Studios
- Release date: 1961
- Running time: 83 minutes
- Country: Soviet Union
- Language: Russian

Sluttish or Whore (Russian: Гулящая) is a 1961 Soviet drama film directed by Ivan Kavaleridze. The film is based on Panas Myrny's novel of the same name (Ukrainian: Повія, Loose Woman).

The black and white film tells the tragic story of Khrystyna, a Ukrainian peasant girl who goes to the city with the hope of improving her life.

== Plot ==
After her father freezes to death while returning from the city with money for taxes, and her mother soon passes away, Khrystyna is left to fend for herself. A local landowner's son deceives her and sends her to work for his associate, merchant Zagnibeda, in the city. Zagnibeda, infatuated with Khrystyna, murders his wife and later showers Khrystyna with lavish gifts before sending her back to her village. However, suspicion of complicity in the murder follows her. Though her innocence is never proven or disproven, she faces rejection and betrayal at every turn. Her trust in people is met with lies, and she becomes a pariah, unable to find work or acceptance. Eventually, she is forced into a bleak existence as a performer at a café called "Chantant," where she entertains an indifferent and privileged audience while losing all hope and meaning in life.

In the end, Khrystyna decides to return to her village. In the harshness of winter, she arrives at night during a snowstorm and pleads for shelter, but the villagers refuse to let her in. Due to the villager's indifference, she ends up freezing to death outside, like her father.

== Cast ==
- Lyudmila Gurchenko
- Rita Gladunko
- Stepan Shkurat
- Anna Nikolayeva
- Nikolai Kozlenko
- Vasili Vekshin
- Leonid Danchishin
- Nikolai Pishvanov
- Pavel Shkryoba
- Georgiy Babenko
