= Myroslav Slaboshpytskyi =

Ukrainian film director

- Мирослав Михайлович Слабошпицький
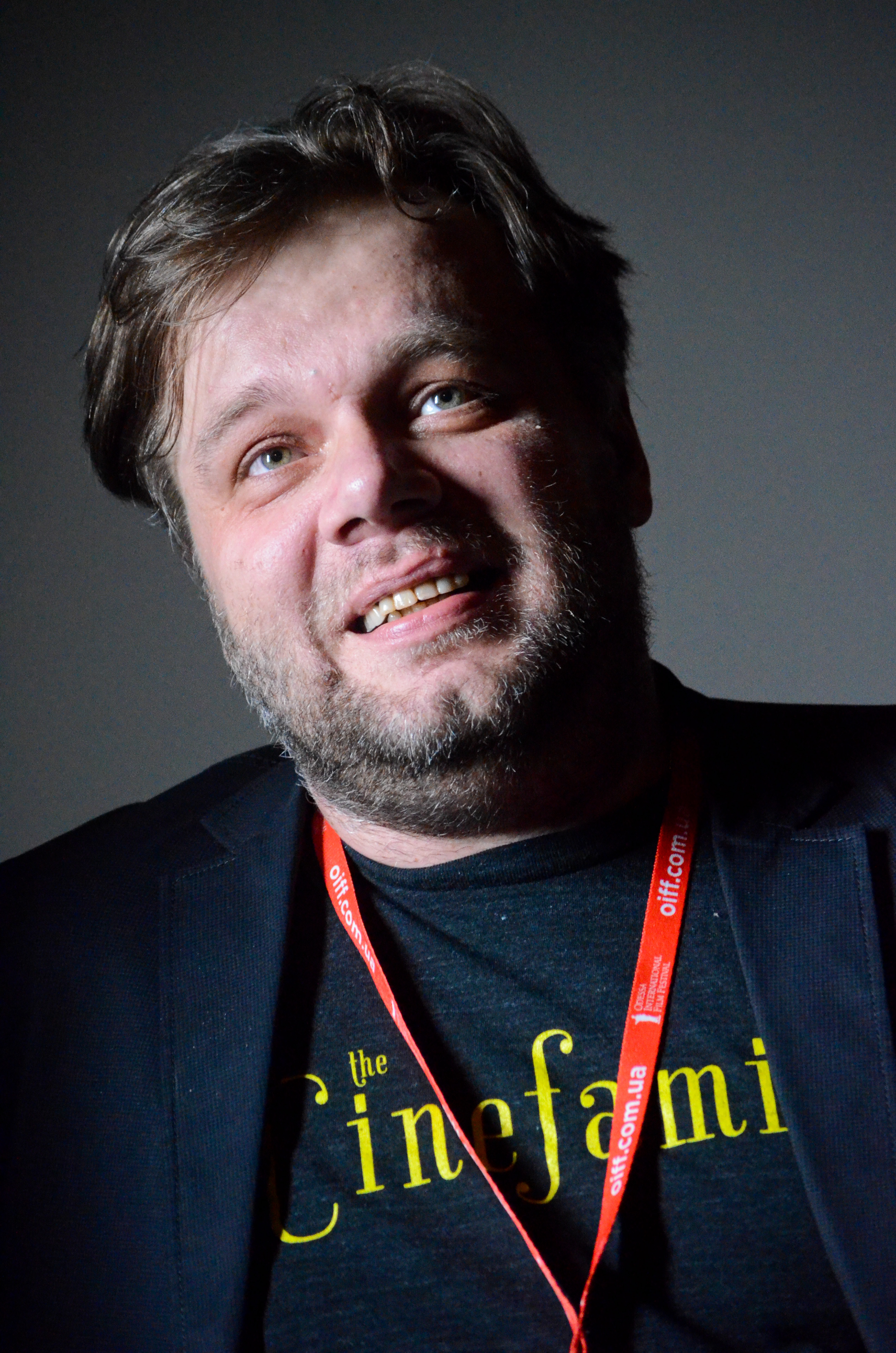
- Myroslav Slaboshpytskyi at the 6th Odesa International Film Festival
- Born: 17 October 1974 (age 51); Kyiv, Ukrainian SSR, USSR
- Citizenship: Ukraine
- Education: National University of Theater, Film, and TV in Kyiv
- Occupations: Film director; screenwriter
- Notable work: The Tribe

Myroslav Mykhailovych Slaboshpytskyi (Ukrainian: Мирослав Михайлович Слабошпицький; born 17 October 1974) is a Ukrainian film director.

== Biography ==
Slaboshpytskyi was born to Ukrainian writer and literary critic Mykhailo Slaboshpytskyi. Until 1982 he lived in Lviv.

Slaboshpytskyi graduated from National University of Theater, Film, and TV in Kyiv with a focus in film and television directing. He has worked as a reporter and written scripts for film and television. In the early 1990s. he worked at the Dovzhenko Film Studios.

Since 2000 he has been a Member of the Ukrainian Association of Cinematographers. He was vice-president of the Association of Young Filmmakers of Ukraine.

In 2002, due to a conflict with the head of the State Cinematography Service Anna Chmil, he went to Russia to St. Petersburg, where he began working as a screenwriter and second director on a number of projects. He worked at the Lenfilm film studio in St. Petersburg, in particular on the series “Detachment” with Igor Lifanov and others.

In 2014, Slaboshpytskyi broke on the scene with his film The Tribe, which premiered at the Cannes Film Festival. The film is entirely in Ukrainian Sign Language with no subtitles. It won the Nespresso Grand Prize, as well as the France 4 Visionary Award and the Gan Foundation Support for Distribution Award at the 2014 Cannes Film Festival's Critics' Week section.

On 24 October 2018, it was announced that Slaboshpytskyi would direct the film Tiger, based on the 2010 non-fiction book by John Vaillant. Focus acquired the book in 2010 and at one point the project was seen as a potential acting vehicle for Brad Pitt and a directing job for Darren Aronofsky. In the end, the two have decided to stay on as producers and allow Slaboshpystskyi to step in to direct.

== Filmography ==
Year	Title	Director	Writer	Producer	Notes
2006	The Incident (Жах)	Yes	No	Yes	Short film; also set decorator
2009	Diagnosis (Діагноз)	Yes	Yes	Yes	Short film; also film editor
2010	Deafness (Глухота)	Yes	Yes	No	Short film; later included in the anthology film Assholes & Arabesques (Мудаки. Арабески, 2011)
2012	Nuclear Waste (Ядерні відходи)	Yes	Yes	No	Short film; later included in the anthology film Ukraine, Goodbye! (Україно, goodbye!, 2012)
2014	The Tribe (Плем'я)	Yes	Yes	No	Feature directorial debut
TBA	The Tiger	Yes	No	No	Pre-production

=== As actor ===
- 1995 : The Guard (Сторож, short film)
- 1999 : Поет та княжна

== Interesting facts ==
Slaboshpytskyi was a close friend of now deceased Ukrainian modern writer Oles Ulianenko.
