= Firecrosser =

2011 film

- Film poster
- Directed by: Mykhailo Illienko
- Written by: Mykhailo Illienko; Kostiantyn Konovalov; Denys Zamriy
- Produced by: Filippov Volodymyr
- Starring: Dmytro Linartovych
- Cinematography: Kryshtalovych Oleksandr
- Release date: 21 September 2011
- Running time: 110 minutes
- Country: Ukraine
- Languages: Ukrainian, Russian, English, Tatar, German, Indigenous language

Firecrosser (Ukrainian: «Той, хто пройшов крізь вогонь», romanized: Toi, khto proishov kriz' vogon') is a 2011 Ukrainian drama film directed by Mykhailo Illienko. The film was selected as the Ukrainian entry for the Best Foreign Language Oscar at the 85th Academy Awards, but it did not make the final shortlist.

The prototype of the protagonist is a World War II ace pilot, Hero of the Soviet Union, Guards Lieutenant Commander Ivan Datsenko, a unit commander of the 10th Guards Aviation Regiment of the 3rd Guards Aviation Division of the 3rd Guards Aviation Corps of Long-Range Aviation, a native of the village of Chernechiy Yar near Dykanka, who allegedly went to Canada after Nazi and Soviet captivity, where he became the leader of an Indian tribe that was part of the Iroquois Confederacy.

== Plot ==
Little Ivan Dodoka witnesses how grain is taken from peasants in Chernychy Yar. After the collectivization and arrest of the priest, people sought consolation and guidance from his father Orestes, whose grandfather seemed to be a character. Secretly from the authorities, he keeps an icon in a hiding place in the house.

As an adult, Ivan joined the Red Army as a pilot. He is instructed to search for the missing pilot who crashed. Dodoka goes in search of nurse Lyubov Karimova and encounters a wolf near the scene of the accident. The nurse calms the wolf with mysterious words. Later, Ivan makes a proposal to Lyubov to marry and she agrees.

One day, Ivan gets on guard duty. He is visited by fellow villager Stepan Shulika, who says that his father was arrested for finding a hiding place. Stepan, taking the opportunity, flirts with Love and, when the German-Soviet war begins, begins to select the letters that Love writes to Ivan. Instead, he writes her own, hoping for reciprocity. On one of the flights, Ivan finds his beloved in his native village and they sign. The couple is visited by the fortune-teller Steph, who predicts that Ivan will become the head of the collective farm and have twelve children, but only one son from Lyubov.

Ivan wins the Golden Star, becomes a Hero of the Soviet Union, and goes on increasingly dangerous flights. Once his plane is shot down, Ivan is taken prisoner. When he is found, Ivan is thrown into the camp as a German spy for slandering Stepan.

Ten years later, Lyubov, not giving up hope of finding Ivan, turns to Stepan for help. He promises to find him if Love gives birth to a son, because Stepan's wife is barren. While in the camps, Ivan convinces the other prisoners that his father taught him to characterize. Superstitious prisoners obey him, and somehow Ivan shares with them plans to repay Stepan. News of these reaches Stepan, who invents how to kill an opponent. Ivan must be shot, allegedly trying to escape. But he escapes and gets to Karim, where Love comes from. Stepan, learning about the escape, guesses that Ivan will be there.

== Cast ==
- Dmytro Linartovych as Ivan Dodoka
- Viktor Andriyenko as Smirnov
- Olha Hrishyna as Luba Karimova
- Oleksandr Ihnatusha as Ugrum-Ruka
- Ivanna Illienko as Shadow
- Oleksiy Kolesnyk as Indian Chief
- Vitaliy Linetskyi as Stepan Shulika
- Oleh Prymohenov as Naskrizny
- Galyna Stefanova as Baba Stefa
- Artem Antonchenko as Nikolai Eremin
- Marina Yurchak as Nadia Rakitina
- Mykola Boklan as Orest (Ivan's father)
- Serhiy Solovyov as Rakitin
- Iryna Bardakova as Margarita
- Denys Karpenko as Gerard
- Volodymyr Levytsky as Ugol
- Oleh Tsyona as Palloniy
- Serhiy Fedorenko as Starshyna
- Lev Levchenko as Vanya (son of Ivan)
- Yaroslav Bilonog as Little Ivan

== Filming locations ==
Most of the filming took place in Ukraine in 2008–2010. It filmed in Kyiv and Kyiv Oblast, including a student campus near Rzhyshchiv, in Kamianets-Podilskyi and its surroundings. They used the ruins of old buildings and a model airplane. One episode was filmed in the mountains on the border of Argentina and Chile.

== See also ==
- List of submissions to the 85th Academy Awards for Best Foreign Language Film
- List of Ukrainian submissions for the Academy Award for Best Foreign Language Film
