= Ukrainian Film Academy =

- Українська кіноакадемія
- Headquarters: Kyiv, Ukraine
- Location: Ukraine
- Chair of the board: Viktoria Tihipko
- CEO: Anna Machuh
- Art Director: Alik Shpiluk

The Ukrainian Film Academy (Ukrainian: Українська кіноакадемія) is a Ukrainian association of experts and professionals in the field of cinema and film production. It was founded in 2017 to support and develop modern Ukrainian cinema. Since 2017, the Ukrainian Film Academy has been holding the prestigious "Golden Dzyga Film Awards" annual event.

== Founders ==
The initiator, creator, and manager of the academy and its award was the Odesa International Film Festival. In 2017, during the creation of the Film Academy, all leading positions of the Film Academy were taken by OIFF managers: Anna Machukh, Director of the OIFF Film Market, became the executive director of the Ukrainian Film Academy, OIFF PR Director Kateryna Zvezdina became the PR Director, OIFF Viktoriya Tigipko – Chairman of the main governing body of the Film Academy – the supervisory board. Since 2018, the PR director of the film academy is the PR director of the OIFF – Tetyana Vlasova, and since 2019 the coordinator of the film academy – Yaroslava Kiyashko. Producer Julia Sinkevych, who was the general producer at OIFF from 2010 to 2022, is also a co-founder.

== History ==
"It's time for our country to have its own Oscar. The industry is reviving, we want to promote our actors, directors, producers – everyone who works in this complex field. It is important to draw public attention to this event." Viktoriya Tigipko, President of the Ukrainian Film Academy and the Odesa International Film Festival

The Ukrainian Film Academy was established as a non-profit public organization on February 8, 2017, which was

announced on February 20 of the same year at a press conference held by the founders, sponsors, and partners of the Film Academy on the occasion of the First National Film Award. The establishment of the Film Academy was initiated by the Odesa International Film Festival with the support of the State Agency of Ukraine for Cinematography and the Joint Stock Company "TASKOMBANK." Anna Machukh has been appointed executive director of the Ukrainian Film Academy and the National Film Award. On April 20, the awards ceremony of the First National Film Award "Golden Dzyga" was held.

In February 2022, a petition was released calling for an international boycott of Russian cinema. The Academy asked the Council of Europe to exclude Russia from funding body Eurimages as well as the European Convention on Cinematographic Co-Production, and for the International Federation of Film Producers Associations to deprive the Moscow International Film Festival of accreditation.

== Purpose and activities ==
The Ukrainian film academy was created with the aim of popularizing Ukrainian cinema in Ukraine and abroad, and providing comprehensive support for the development of national cinema by:

- Organization and holding of events during which experts of the film industry will objectively determine the best achievements and personalities in the National Cinema. One of these events is the annual ceremony of awarding the National Film award "Golden Dzyga" for outstanding achievements in Ukrainian cinema.
- Organization of events to familiarize moviegoers with the latest Ukrainian cinematography.
- Financial support for educational film programs.

== Membership in the film academy ==
Membership in the film academy, according to its charter, is based on the principle of voluntariness and is individual. The academy can include anyone who meets the requirements of one of three categories:

- Representatives of the film industry who, since 1991, have participated as authors (actors, screenwriters, directors, cameramen, production designers, or composers) or producers in the creation of one or more full-length feature films or three or more short documentaries and/or animated films.
- Cultural, art, and film industry figures who have made a significant contribution to the development and promotion of Ukrainian cinema (among them distributors, film critics, and heads of International Film Festivals).
- Patrons and sponsors of domestic cinema.

Applications for membership in the film academy were accepted from February 20 to March 19, 2017. According to the results, out of 343 applications, 242 Ukrainian filmmakers received the status of a member of the Ukrainian film academy. The second acceptance of applications for membership in the film academy lasted from April 27, 2017, to January 15, 2018.

As of 2019, the academy consists of 355 Ukrainian film professionals.

== Film Academy management bodies ==
- The General assembly of members is the highest governing body of the film academy, in which all current members of the film academy have the right to participate.
- The Executive director manages the daily work of the organization. He is elected by the supervisory board of the film academy for a three-year term.
- The Supervisory Board is the governing body of the film academy, which monitors the work of the executive director of the management company. It consists of five people who cannot be members of the film academy, three of whom are permanent and are elected for a term of 20 years. It is headed by the chairman of the supervisory board, who is elected from among the members of the supervisory board for a term of 20 years. Viktoriya Tigipko was elected the first chairman of the supervisory board of the Ukrainian film academy in early April 2017.

The advisory body of the film academy is the management board, which consists of 15 members, 12 of whom are elected by the general meeting of the film academy and three are appointed by the supervisory board of the film academy. The board of the Ukrainian National Film Academy is headed by the chairman of the management board, who is elected by the decision of the management board from among the approved members of the management board. The first chairman of the Board of the Ukrainian film academy in early April 2017 was the famous Ukrainian film director and actor Mikhailo Illienko, who held this position until November 2018. Currently, the chairman of the Board of the Ukrainian film academy is Ukrainian film critic Volodymyr Voitenko.

=== Board of the Ukrainian film academy ===
Composition of the Board of the Ukrainian film academy (from October 2018):

- Volodymyr Voitenko, film critic — chairman of the board
- Sergey Bordenyuk, cinematographer
- Lyudmila Gordeladze, actress
- Ivanna Dyadyura, film producer
- Denis Ivanov, producer, film demonstrator
- Mikhailo Illienko, film director
- Sergey Lavrenyuk, producer
- Yuri Minzyanov, producer
- Yegor Olesov, producer
- Andriy Rizol, producer
- Vlad Ryashin, producer
- Igor Savichenko, producer
- Akhtem Seitablayev, film director, actor
- Valeria Sochivets, producer
- Marina Stepanska, film director

== Film Academy logo ==
The concept of the logo of the Ukrainian Film Academy was developed by the marketing team "Quadrate 28." When developing the logo, it was based on the image of the symbol of the film academy – the "Golden Dzyga," embodied by the famous Ukrainian artist Nazar Bilyk.

== See also ==
- Cinema of Ukraine
- Golden Dzyga

== Sources ==
- Володимир Войтенко став головою правління Української кіноакадемії. Кінокритика. 14 листопада 2018. Процитовано 14.11.2018.

== Materials ==
- Положення про Правління Української кіноакадемії на сайті Бюро української кіножурналістики
- Положення про Наглядову раду Української кіноакадемії на сайті Бюро української кіножурналістики
- Українська кіноакадемія оголосила новий склад Правління та Наглядової ради. Детектор медіа. 25 жовтня 2018.
