= The First Code =

2023 Ukrainian documentary film

The First Code (Ukrainian: «Перший код», romanized: Pershyi kod) is a Ukrainian feature-documentary film of 2023 directed by Arthur Lerman. The film's producer is Vladyslav Savchenko. The film was released on November 16, 2023, and tells the story of the development of Ukrainian IT from the 1950s to the present, especially focusing on its role in cyber warfare following the onset of full-scale invasion.

== Plot ==
The film narrates the history of Ukrainian IT development from the 1950s, starting with the creation of the first computer by Ukrainian engineers, up to the present day. The protagonists of the film include politicians and IT industry figures, such as the Minister of Digital Transformation Mykhailo Fedorov, founders of Ukrainian companies and startups, and representatives of the V. M. Glushkov Institute of Cybernetics of the National Academy of Sciences of Ukraine. Initially, the audience is introduced to the representatives of the Institute of Cybernetics, who discuss the transition from Soviet heritage to modern software engineering realities. The film then explores young startup founders who learned to navigate the IT market in challenging conditions. The narrative then focuses on the next generation, the founders of companies like UKLON, Sigma Software Group, and other major players in the Ukrainian IT sector. The film depicts the journey of ordinary IT entrepreneurs from the beginning of their careers to becoming millionaires with international recognition and reputation. The film also highlights the role of cyber warfare after the onset of full-scale invasion and how the IT sector became part of the fight against Russia.

== Heroes ==
- Oleksandr Khimych — academician of the National Academy of Sciences of Ukraine
- Ivan Serhiienko — director of the V.M. Glushkov Institute of Cybernetics
- Oleksiy Sigov — president of the international company Infopulse
- Ihor Braginsky — founder of the company NIX
- Oleksiy Skrypnyk — co-founder of the company ELEX
- Yuriy Antonyuk — vice president of the company ERAM
- Taras Kytsmei — co-founder of the company SoftServe
- Yuriy Lazebnykov — co-founder of the Techiia holding
- Valeriy Krasovsky — co-founder and CEO of Sigma Software
- Dmytro Vartanian — co-founder, Board Member of Sigma Software
- Volodymyr Bek — co-founder, Board Member of Sigma Software
- Yuriy Monastyryshyn — founder of the company Looksery
- Vadym Rogovskyi — founder of the startup 3DLOOK
- Vitaliy Dyatlenko — co-founder and CTO of the company UKLON
- Artem Borodatiuk — founder of the Netpeak Group of companies
- Dmytro Voloshyn — CTO of the company Preply
- Anton Melnyk — expert in innovation, investments, and startups at the Ministry of Digital Transformation
- Andriy and Oleksandr — developers of the game "Play for Ukraine" (to counter DDOS attacks)
- Denys — IT warrior (owner of an advertising agency, involved in targeted advertising on social media)
- Artem — IT warrior (developer of an application that blocked Russian computers with the 1C system)

== Production ==
The first code is a project of the European Association of Software Engineering (EASE). The film's director is Arthur Lerman, and the producer and investor of the film is Vladyslav Savchenko, the president of EASE. The cinematography is by Yevhen Usanov. Vladyslav Savchenko also conducted the research and financed the creation of The first code. The film's budget was $800,000, with an additional estimated cost of $1 million for marketing, adaptations, and streaming platform launches. Filming began in late 2021, with the premiere initially planned for September. However, due to the full-scale invasion, filming was suspended for several months until August 2022. The first code became the first Ukrainian and one of the world's first feature films to utilize AI for multi-voice dubbing. 80% of the dialogues in the film were translated by artificial intelligence, with only 20% done by voice actors. AI was also used to create promotional materials. In June 2022, the film's team unveiled a 20-meter mural on Prospekt Nauky in Kyiv in honor of Ukrainian IT specialists. The soundtrack for the film, titled "Hidden Code," was performed by the duo Tvorchi.

== Reception ==
=== Box Office ===
The film was shown in 121 cinemas across Ukraine. According to Forbes estimates, the box office of The first code in Ukraine amounted to approximately 973,000 hryvnias. This was a record for the first weekend among documentaries. The film was also screened in Latvia, Lithuania, and Poland, as well as on streaming platforms such as Amazon and Apple TV+. Additionally, the film is available on the Megogo platform.

=== Reviews ===
The first code received many positive reviews during private screenings in Warsaw, London, Berlin, Barcelona, Lisbon, New York, Los Angeles, and San Francisco.
