= Golden Dzyga =

Ukrainian Film Academy Award

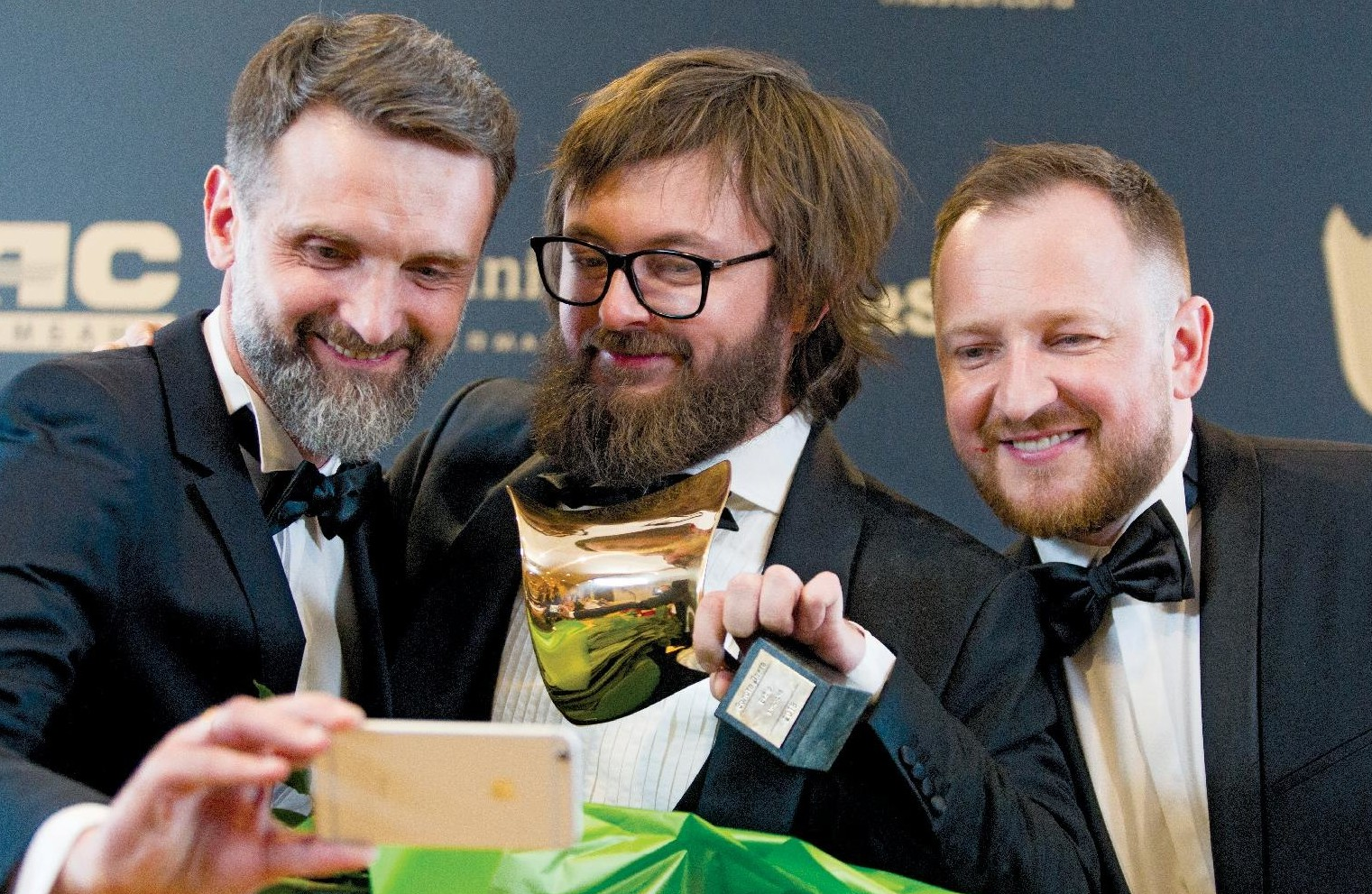
- Award ceremony (2018)
- Description: National Film Award
- Country: Ukraine
- Presented by: Ukrainian Film Academy
- First award: 2017
- Website: official website

The Golden Dzyga (Ukrainian: Золота дзиґа) is a Ukrainian national film award given for professional achievements in the development of Ukrainian cinema. Founded in 2017 by the Ukrainian Film Academy, the first awards ceremony took place on April 20, 2017, at the Fairmont Grand Hotel Kyiv.

== Selection of films and determination of winners ==
Submission of films for the First National Film Award lasted from February 20 to March 20, 2017. Films that premiered during 2016 — from January 1 to December 31 inclusive-were accepted for participation in the selection process. The full list of films (longlist) that competed in the competition for the First National Film award consisted of 54 films: 12 of them — full-length feature films, 15 — short feature films, 19 — documentaries, 8-animated. A total of 76 films were submitted, ⁣ Contenders were determined by closed non-commercial viewing of online copies of films.

The winners of the First National Film Prize were elected by all members of the Film Academy by a three-stage vote. Currently, the winners of the Film Award are determined by a two-stage vote of members of the Ukrainian Film Academy.

On April 3, 2017, the Board of the Film Academy published a short list of 17 nominees for the First National Film Award.

== Prize ==
The Golden Dzyga Award is awarded in the following 22 categories (2020):

- Best film
- Best Director (Yuri Ilyenko award)
- Best Lead Actor
- Best Actress in a Leading Role
- Best Supporting Actor
- Best Supporting Actress
- Best Cinematographer
- Best Scenography
- Best Screenplay
- Best Composer
- Best Documentary
- Best Animated Film
- Best Short Film
- Best Makeup Artist (since 2018)
- Best Costume Designer (since 2018)
- Best Sound Director (since 2018)
- Best Song (Artist Awards) (since 2019)
- Award for the best visual effects
- Best Editing (award granted since 2019)
- Discovery of the Year
- Contribution to the development of Ukrainian cinematography
- Audience Award (an award granted since 2018)

== Symbol ==
The main symbol of the National Film Award is the Golden Dzyga statuette, which symbolizes the rapid and relentless development of Ukrainian cinema (ukr. дзиґа – eng. top (toy)). In addition, the title is reminiscent and tribute to the creative legacy of the outstanding cinematographer Dziga Vertov. Dziga Vertov is an artistic name of David Abelovich Kaufman. D.A. Kaufman, was born in Białystok in 1896, died in Moscow in 1954. He became a pioneering and famous film documentalist, whose 1929-made Man with a Movie Camera was acclaimed by the British magazine Sight & Sound as the best documentary film of all time.

The creator of the award's title is Olga Zakharova, director of strategic marketing at Media Group Ukraine.

The statuette was designed by Ukrainian artist Nazar Bilyk, who described the Golden Dzyga as follows: "The main element of the composition is a frame made of film, a golden quadrangle that rotates dynamically, representing cinematography. In shape, the statuette resembles a whirlwind, fire, a scion, all of which symbolize the development and renewal of national cinema."

== Ceremonies ==
Ceremony	Date	Best Movie	Place	Ceremony's Host(-s)
1st	April 20, 2017	The Nest of the Turtledove	Kyiv, Fairmont Grand Hotel Kyiv	Oleksandr Skichko
2nd	April 20, 2018	Cyborgs: Heroes Never Die	Kyiv, Parkovy Convention and Exhibition Center	Akhtem Seitablayev and Vasilisa Frolova
3rd	April 19, 2019	Donbass	Kyiv, Parkovy Convention and Exhibition Center	Darya Tregubova and Oleg Panyuta
4th	May 3, 2020	My Thoughts Are Silent	online	Darya Tregubova and Timur Miroshnychenko

== See also ==
- Ukrainian Film Academy
- Teletriumph Awards

== Sources ==
- Національна кінопремія
- Регламент Другої національної кінопремії
- Регламент Третьої національної кінопремії
- Регламент Четвертої Національної кінопремії
