= The White Bird Marked with Black =

- Directed by: Yuri Ilyenko
- Written by: Yuri Ilyenko; Ivan Mykolaychuk
- Produced by: P. Tarasov
- Starring: Larisa Kadochnikova; Ivan Mykolaychuk; Bohdan Stupka
- Cinematography: Vilen Kalyuta
- Edited by: Nataliya Pishchikova
- Music by: Ivan Mykolaychuk
- Production company: Dovzhenko Film Studios
- Release date: 31 July 1971 (MIFF)
- Running time: 99 minutes
- Country: Soviet Union
- Languages: Ukrainian; Russian; Romanian

The White Bird Marked with Black (Ukrainian: «Білий птах з чорною ознакою», romanized: Bilyi ptakh z chornoyu oznakoyu, Russian: «Белая птица с чёрной отметиной», romanized: Belaya ptitsa s chornoy otmetinoy) is a 1971 Soviet Ukrainian period drama film directed by Yuri Ilyenko. It was entered into the 7th Moscow International Film Festival and won the Golden Prize.

== Plot ==
The plot takes place between 1937 and 1947, in a little, traditional Hutsul village in Northern Bukovina. The Zvonars are a poor family of musicians, who eke out a living by performing in the local celebrations. Both older brothers, Petro and Orest, are in love with Dana, the priest's beautiful daughter. Their younger brother, Heorhii, is a dreamlike adolescent who is attracted to the village's witch, Vivdya. In 1940, the Romanian authorities cede the territory to the Soviets. Dana falls for a Red Army officer named Ostap and decides to marry him. On the day of their wedding, the Germans and Romanians invade. Ostap has to return to his unit, and Petro leaves the band to join the Red Army. Orest seduces Dana and takes her to the mountains, where he joins the Ukrainian nationalists and subsequently, the Ukrainian Insurgent Army. After three years of brutal Romanian occupation, Ostap and Petro return as the Soviets retake the area. They attempt to introduce progress, bringing the villagers a modern tractor. Dana abandons Orest and returns to the village. He ties Ostap to the tractor and sets it aflame; Petro attempts to save him, but both die. When he visits a wedding to dance with Dana, older Heorhii and the villagers finally decide to confront him. He commits suicide when he is cornered. Heorhii studies medicine and becomes a doctor under the new Soviet system.

== Cast ==
- Larisa Kadochnikova as Dana
- Oleg Polstvin as child Heorhii
- Mykhailo Illienko as Heorhii
- Ivan Mykolaychuk as Petro
- Bohdan Stupka as Orest
- Yuri Mikolaychuk as Bohdan
- Natalya Naum as Katrina
- Dzhemma Firsova as Vivdya
- Aleksandr Plotnikov as Les Zvonar
- Vasili Simchich as Father Miron
- Leonid Bakshtayev as Ostap
- Vladimir Shakalo as Pan Levitsky
- Nikolai Olejnik as Roman (the role voiced actor Pavel Morozenko)

== Production ==
The White Bird Marked with Black was conceived by lead actor and screenwriter Ivan Mykolaychuk in 1969. On 6 May 1969, he met with director Yuri Ilyenko and offered him to compose a script based on his idea. Ilyenko accepted, and the two ended their work on the screenplay by 15 June. They submitted it to the Dovzhenko Film Studios: member of the board Leonid Osyka, who had previously cooperated with Ilyenko, praised the script and convinced the other studio bosses to take it in. It was then forwarded to the State Cinema Committee of the Ukrainian SSR, which authorized it without delay in spite of the politically sensitive topic. Yevhen Khrinyuk, the studio's artistic director, used his connections to have the authorities in Moscow give the final approval. On 16 September, the Dovzhenko Studios signed a contract with the writers and production commenced. Ilyenko's White Bird was meant to be "Ukraine's showcase film for the 25th Anniversary of Victory Day".

Mikolaychuk intended to portray Orest, the brother who became a Ukrainian nationalist and served as antagonist, and wrote the character for himself, turning it to the most developed and multi-layered in the film. In comparison, Communist Petro was superficial. This element was detected by members of the Ukrainian Communist Party's Central Committee who reviewed the script: subsequently, Goskino refused to allow the actor to have the role, and young Bohdan Stupka received it.

== Bibliography ==
- First, Joshua J. Scenes of Belonging: Cinema and the Nationality Question in Soviet Ukraine During the Long 1960s. ProQuest (2008). ISBN 978-0-549-98492-4.
