= Borys Ivchenko =

Ukrainian actor and film director

- Іван Івченко
- Born: 29 January 1941; Zaporizhzhia, Ukrainian SSR, Soviet Union
- Died: 28 June 1990 (aged 49); Kyiv, Ukrainian SSR, Soviet Union
- Burial place: Baikove Cemetery, Kyiv, Ukraine
- Education: Kyiv National I. K. Karpenko-Kary Theatre, Cinema and Television University
- Occupation: Film director

Borys Viktorovych Ivchenko (Ukrainian: Борис Вікторович Івченко; 29 January 1941 – 28 June 1990) was a Ukrainian actor and film director. He was the son of another Ukrainian and Soviet film director, Viktor Ivchenko.

== Biography ==
Borys Viktorovych Ivchenko was born on 29 January 1941 in Zaporizhzhia, the Ukrainian SSR. He graduated from the Kyiv State Institute of Theatrical Arts in 1966. All his life Ivchenko worked at the Dovzhenko Film Studios. He died on 28 June 1990 and is buried at the Baikove Cemetery in Kyiv.

== Filmography ==
=== Actor ===
- 1958 E.A. — Extraordinary Accident
- 1960 Fortress on wheels
- 1960 Human blood - not water
- 1961 Dmytro Horytsvit
- 1968 Annychka
- 1979 Babylon XX

=== Film director ===
- 1966 Intermission
- 1968 Annychka
- 1971 Olesya
- 1972 The Lost Letter
- 1973 When a Person Smiled
- 1974 Maryna
- 1976 Memory of Land
- 1979 Under the Constellation Gemini
- 1980 Tomorrow's Bread
- 1981 Two Days in December
- 1982 Starry Travel
- 1983 Sudden Ejection
- 1990 Stories About Ivan
