= Viktor Ivchenko =

Soviet Ukrainian film director and screenwriter (1912–1972)

Viktor Ilarionovych Ivchenko (Ukrainian: Віктор Іларіонович Івченко; 4 November [O.S. 22 November] 1912 – 6 November 1972) was a Soviet Ukrainian film director, screenwriter and theatre pedagogue. He worked at the Zankovetska Ukrainian Drama Theatre (1937–1953) and at the Kyiv Feature Film Studio named after O. Dovzhenko (1953–1972). He was named People's Artist of the Ukrainian SSR (1960) and received the Shevchenko National Prize (1967). He was the father of film director Borys Ivchenko.

== Biography ==
Ivchenko was born in Bohodukhiv, then in the Kharkiv Governorate of the Russian Empire (present-day Ukraine). He graduated from the Kharkiv Road-Construction College in 1933 and the Kyiv Theatre Institute in 1937. He worked as an actor and stage director at the Zankovetska Ukrainian Drama Theatre from 1937 to 1953, and from 1953 until his death was a film director at the Kyiv Feature Film Studio named after O. Dovzhenko (now Dovzhenko Film Studios). He taught at the Kyiv Theatre Institute in the 1960s–1970s.

He was married (first) to Olha Nozhkina and later to actress Ninel Myshkova. Ivchenko died on 6 November 1972 in Kyiv.

== Selected filmography ==
- Marina’s Destiny (Sud’ba Mariny, 1953; co-dir. Isaak Shmaruk) — In Competition, 1954 Cannes Film Festival.
- Nazar Stodolia (1955)
- There Is Such a Fellow (1956)
- E.A. – Extraordinary Accident (1958)
- Ivanna (1959)
- Forest Song (Lisova pisnia, 1961) — co-writer.
- Hello, Hnat! (1962)
- The Silver Coach (1963)
- The Viper (Hadiuka, 1965)
- The Tenth Step (1967)
- Frost Was Falling (1969)
- Way to the Heart (1970)
- Sofia Hrushko (1972)

== Honours and awards ==
- People's Artist of the Ukrainian SSR (1960).
- Shevchenko National Prize (1967), for the feature film The Viper (1965).
- Order of the Red Banner of Labour (date not specified in sources).
- Marina’s Destiny — In Competition, 1954 Cannes Film Festival.
- Prizes at All-Union film festivals (years/titles vary in sources).
