= Mykhailo Illienko =

Soviet film director and actor

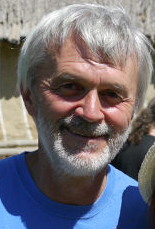
Mykhailo Illienko

Mykhailo Herasymovych Illienko (Ukrainian: Миха́йло Гера́симович Іллє́нко; born 29 June 1947) is a Ukrainian film director, screenwriter, and actor. He is an Academician of the National Academy of Arts of Ukraine (2017), an Honored Artist of Ukraine (2003), and a Laureate of the Oleksandr Dovzhenko State Prize of Ukraine (2007).

== Biography ==
Mykhailo Illienko was born on 29 June 1947, in Moscow, Russian SFSR, Soviet Union. He graduated from the All-Union State Institute of Cinematography in 1970. Since 1973, he has been a director at the Kyiv Dovzhenko Film Studio. Since 1997, he has been the organizer of the Open Night Film Festival. Since 2000, he has been the dean of the film faculty at the Kyiv National I. K. Karpenko-Kary Theatre, Cinema and Television University. He is a member of the National Union of Cinematographers of Ukraine. From April 2017 to November 2018, he was the Chairman of the Board of the Ukrainian Film Academy.

In March 2022, he joined the Ukrainian Territorial Defense Forces during the Russian invasion of Ukraine.
