= Leonid Osyka =

Ukrainian filmmaker

Leonid Mykhailovych Osyka (Ukrainian: Леонід Михайлович Осика) (8 March 1940 in Kyiv – 16 September 2001 in Kyiv) was a Ukrainian movie director, producer, and screen writer.

Osyka was awarded the Oleksandr Dovzhenko State Prize of Ukraine, which was established to honor outstanding contributions to the development of Ukrainian cinema.

== Selected films ==
- 1965 - The One Who Goes Into the Sea ("Та, що входить у море"), director
- 1968 - The Stone Cross ("Камінний хрест"), director; late 2009 saw the beginning of the digital restoration of this film.
- 1968 - Who return, will love to the end ("Хто повернеться — долюбить"), director
- 1971 - Zakhar Berkut ("Заxap Бepкут"), director
- 1976 - The Disturbed Month of September ("Тривожний місяць вересень"), director
- 1978 - Sea ("Море"), director
- 1985 - Earth-reaching bowing ("Вклонися до землі"), director, writer
- 1987 - Enter, the suffered ones ("Увійдіть, стражденні!"), director, writer
- 1991 - Gift on Birthday ("Подарунок на іменини"), director, writer
- 1993 - Hetman's Regalia ("Гетьманські клейноди"), director, writer
