= Odesa Film Studio =

Ukrainian film production company

Coordinates: 46.4596°N 30.7571°E

- Company type: Private joint-stock company
- Industry: Film
- Founded: 1919
- Headquarters: Frantsuz'ky Bulvar 33, Odesa, Ukraine
- Key people: Andrii Osipov (acting Chairman)
- Products: Motion pictures, TV films
- Owner: Government of Ukraine (50%+1) and Nova Film Studios LLC (50%-1)
- Number of employees: 100
- Parent: Odesa Film Studios of featured films Nova Film Studios
- Website: odesafilmstudio.com.ua

The Odesa Film Studio (Ukrainian: Одеська кіностудія художніх фільмів, Russian: Одесская киностудия художественных фильмов) is a Ukrainian, formerly Soviet, film studio in Odesa, Odesa Oblast. Founded in 1919, it was one of the first and oldest studios in the Russian Empire and later Soviet Union.

It is partially owned by the government and supervised by the State Property Fund of Ukraine and the Ministry of Culture. Together with Dovzhenko Film Studios, they are the only state-owned and major film producers in the country. The studio is located at 33 French Boulevard (33 Французский бульвар), in Odesa, Ukraine.

== History and reorganization ==
It was founded on 23 May 1919 by the decision of the Odesa Governorate's Executive Committee, from the remnants of cinema studios of Myron Grossman, Dmitriy Kharitonov, and Borisov. It was one of the first domestic film producers in the Soviet Union. At first, it was listed as "Political film section of political department and of 41st Division of the Red Army", and the first feature film filmed under this name was the "Spiders and flies." The original studios went into decline after the Russian Civil War and the Ukrainian War of Independence, as their owners emigrated, running from political prosecution. Grossman's film studio "Myrograph" existed in Odesa since 1907 and was the oldest one recorded in Ukraine.

In 1922, it was reorganized into the "Odesa Film Factory of the All-Ukrainian Photo Cinema Administration (VUFKU)". The Odesa film studio was the VUFKU’s main production facility. In 1926, Vyacheslav Levandovskyi and Deviatkin created an animation studio of VUFKU.

In 1930, VUFKU was reorganized into "Ukrainafilm" of "Soyuzkino" (Union-cinema).

During the years of the Second World War (Eastern Front 1941-1945) it was part of the Tashkent Film Studio. By 1954 they returned to Odesa.

In 1955, the Odesa Film Studio resumed its own film production. Director Alexander Gorky not only obtained permission to revive the studio, but also solved the personnel problem by inviting VGIK graduates — directors, cameramen, artists, and economists. Then the former students, who usually went for years as assistants, quickly got independent work. On November 26, 1956, the film by Felix Mironer and Marlen Khutsiev "Spring on Zarechnaya Street" was released, which became a significant event not only for the studio, but for the entire Soviet cinema.

In 1979, the Odesa Film Studio released The Meeting Place Cannot Be Changed. It is the highest grossing film of the studio, and was popular throughout the Soviet Union.

In 2005, Odesa film studio was reorganized as a Closed Joint Stock Company, with the government owning the majority of shares.

In 2019, the National Bank of Ukraine issued a commemorative coin titled "100 years Odesa Film Studio"

In addition, the main Ukraine post service issued a special anniversary stamp dedicated to the Odesa film studio.

== Description ==
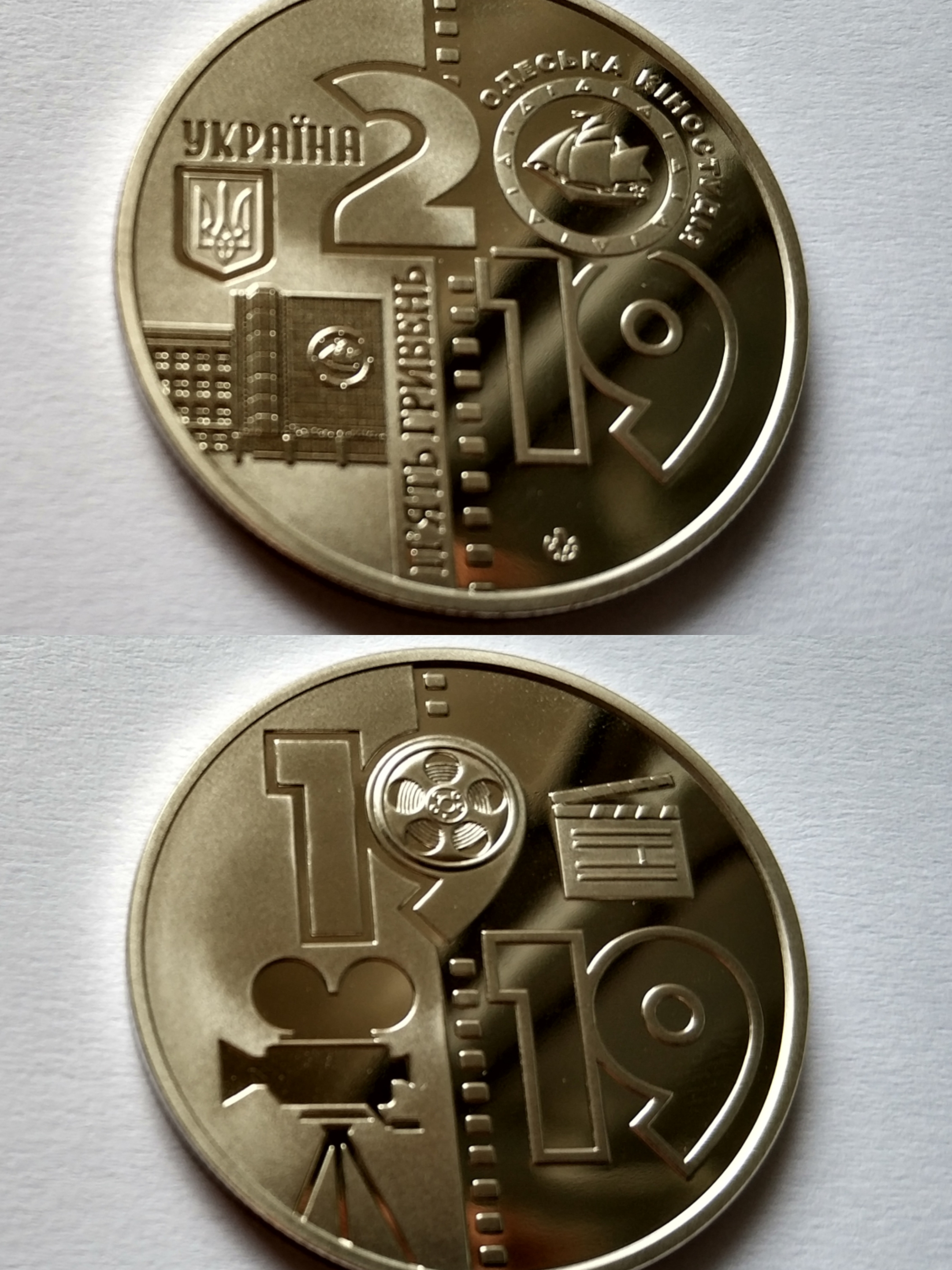
Commemorative coin Odesa Film Studio

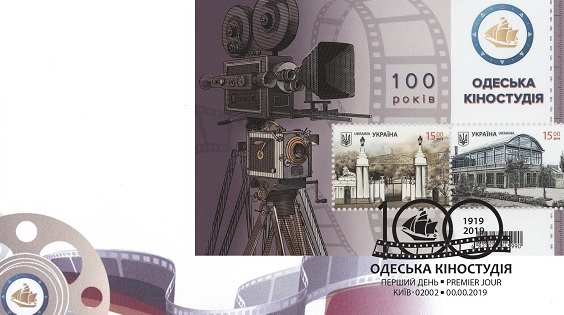
Anniversary stamp dedicated to the Odesa Film Studio

The studio is located in the downtown right near the shore of Black Sea covering some 7 hectares (17 acres) and consisting of three pavilions of 600 square metres (6,500 sq ft), 432 square metres (4,650 sq ft), and 240 square metres (2,600 sq ft). Inside the studio's building is located another film studio, Vira Kholodna Film Studio and the Odesa Film School. The Odesa Film Studio has its own movie theater, U-Cinema, which is also located in the same building.

Near the studio is the Museum of the Cinema.

=== Cinema Museum ===
On the territory of the Odesa film studio there is a cinema museum of the Odesa branch of the National Union of Cinematographers of Ukraine. The museum stores materials collected over the years of the existence of the Odesa Film Studio, film catalogs, photo albums of acting tests, information about directors and producers, film equipment, books, newspapers, film magazines, etc. In total, more than twelve thousand "storage units".

== Directors ==
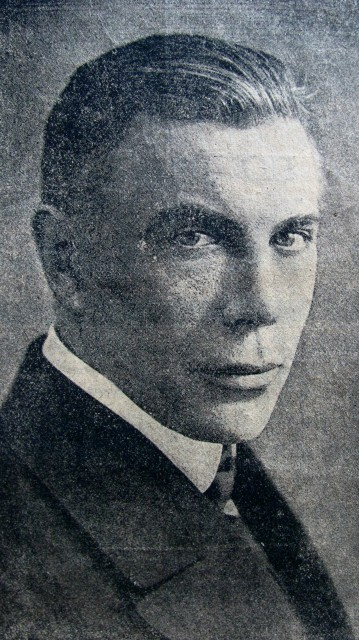
Pyotr Chardynin

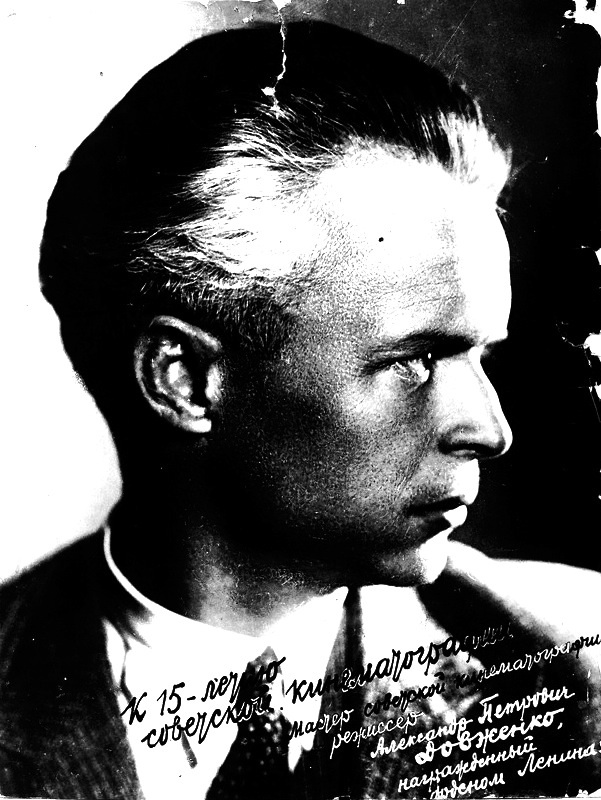
Oleksandr Dovzhenko

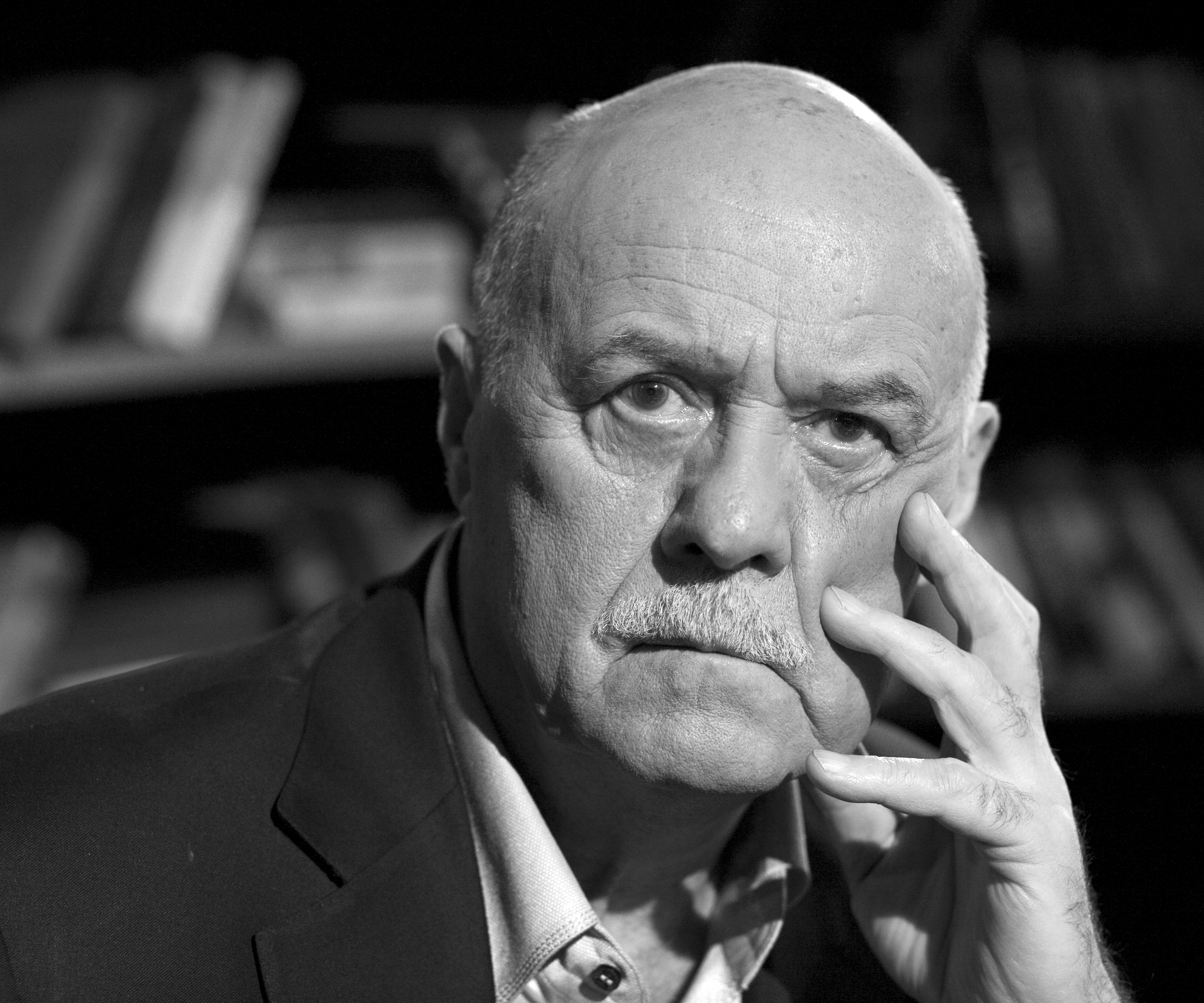
Stanislav Govorukhin

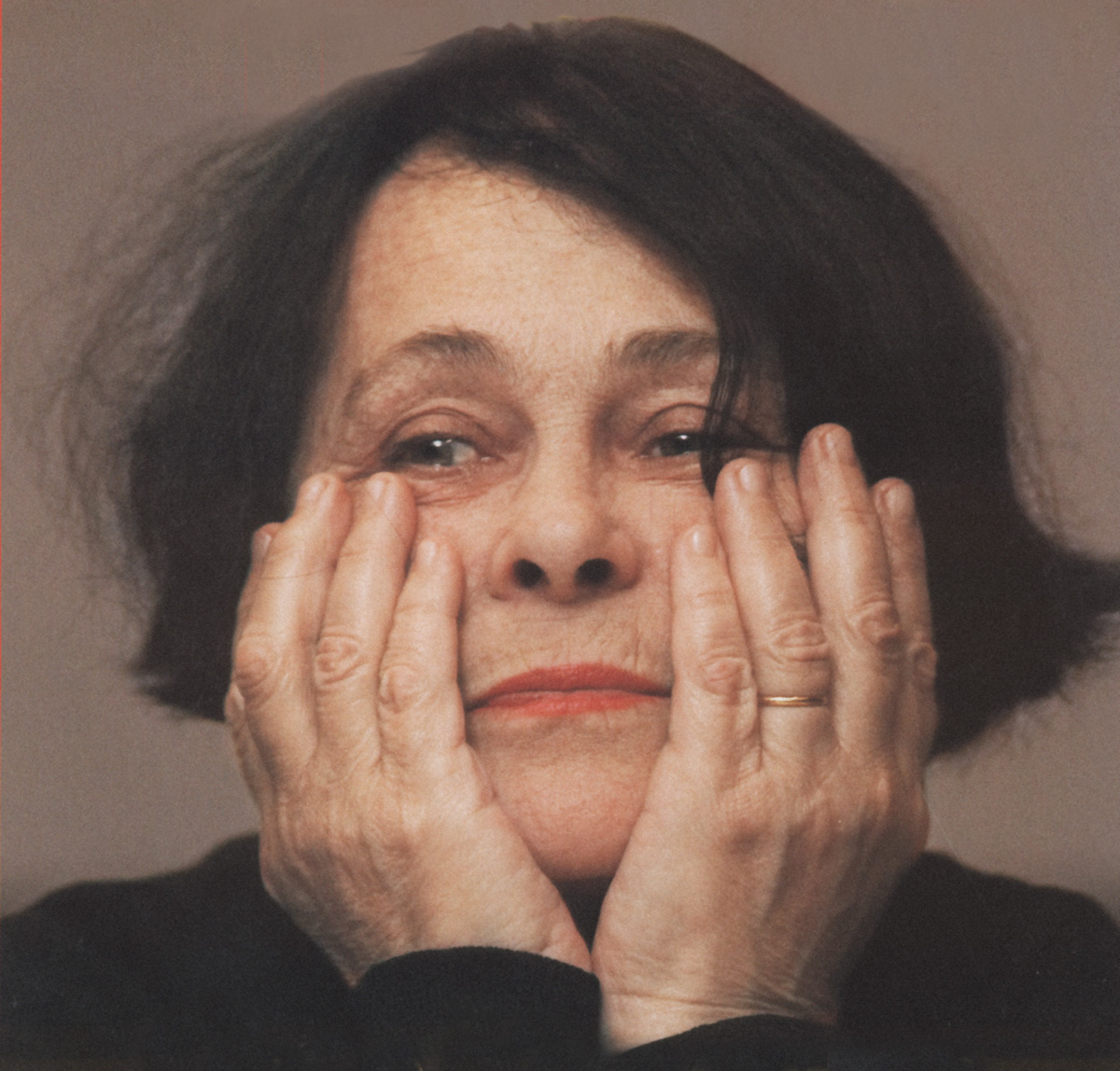
Kira Muratova

== Selected films ==
=== Soviet Union ===
- 1926 Ягідка кохання / Love's Berries, directed by Oleksandr Dovzhenko (silent film)
- 1926 Вася – реформатор / Vasia the Reformer, directed by Oleksandr Dovzhenko (silent film)
- 1926 Тарас Трясило / Taras Triasylo, directed by Petro Chardynin (silent film)
- 1926 Тарас Шевченко / Taras Shevchenko, directed by Petro Chardynin (silent film)
- 1927 Сумка дипкур'єра / The Diplomatic Pouch, directed by Oleksandr Dovzhenko (silent film)
- 1928 Арсенал / Arsenal, directed by Oleksandr Dovzhenko (silent film)
- 1928 Звенигора / Zvenyhora, directed by Oleksandr Dovzhenko (silent film)
- 1936 Назар Стодоля / Nazar Stodolia, directed by Heorhiy Tasin
- 1941 Таємничий острів / Mysterious Island, directed by Eduard Pentslin
- 1957 Орлёнок / Orlyonok, directed by Eduard Nikandrovich Bocharov
- 1967 Короткі зустрічі / Brief Encounters, directed by Kira Muratova
- 1978 Д'Артаньян та три мушкетери / D'Artagnan and Three Musketeers, directed by Heorhiy Yungvald-Khilkevych
- 1979 Пригоди Електроніка / The Adventures of the Elektronic, directed by Kostiantyn Bromberg
- 1979 Місце зустрічі змінити не можна / The Meeting Place Cannot Be Changed, directed by Stanislav Hovorukhin
- 1982 Трест, що луснув / The Trust That Has Burst, directed by Oleksandr Pavlovskyi
- 1982 Чарівники / Wizards, directed by Kostiantyn Bromberg
- 1983 Серед сірих каменів / Among Grey Stones, directed by Kira Muratova
- 1983 Військово-польовий роман / Wartime Romance, directed by Petro Todorovskyi
- 1983 Колесо історії / Wheel of History, directed by Stanislav Klymenko
- 1986 У пошуках капітана Гранта / In search of Captain Grant, directed by Stanislav Hovorukhin
- 1987 Данило — князь Галицький / Danylo — Kniaz of Halychyna, directed by Yaroslav Lupiy
- 1989 Астенічний синдром / The Asthenic Syndrome, directed by Kira Muratova

=== Ukraine ===
- 1991 Чудо в краю забуття / Miracle in the Land of Oblivion, directed by Natalia Motuzko
- 1999 Як коваль щастя шукав / How the Blacksmith Looked for Happiness, directed by Radomyr Vasylevsky
- 2001 На Полі Крові / Akeldama, directed by Yaroslav Lupiy
- 2007 Біля річки / At the River, directed by Eva Neymann

== Selected directors ==
1919–1925

- Myron Grossman (1908–1918) (considered a founder of Odesa cinematography)
- Pyotr Chardynin (1923–1932)
- Les Kurbas (1922–1925)
- Georgiy Tasin, the first studio director in 1922

1926-1936

- Oleksandr Dovzhenko
- Isaak Babel

1936-1954

- Vladimir Braun
- Amvrosiy Buchma

1955-1965

- Kira Muratova and Oleksandr Muratov
- Vadym Kostromenko, the director of the museum
- Vadym Avloshenko
- Pyotr Todorovsky

1966-1996

- Georgi Yungvald-Khilkevich
- Stanislav Govorukhin
- Aleksandr Pavlovsky
- Natalya Zbandut (Medyuk)
- Mykhailo Kats

== Selected actors ==
1919-1925

- Vera Kholodnaya (1914-1919) (featured in 35 films)
- Daria Zerkalova

1926-1936

- Natalya Uzhviy
- Matviy Lyarov

1966-1996

- Vladimir Vysotsky

== Others ==
- Samvel Gasparov

== See also ==
- All-Ukrainian Photo Cinema Administration (VUFKU)
- Dovzhenko Film Studios
- Kyivnaukfilm
- National Cinematheque of Ukraine
- List of Ukrainian films

== Bibliography ==
- Histoire du cinéma ukrainien (1896–1995), Lubomir Hosejko, Éditions à Dié, Dié, 2001, ISBN 978-2-908730-67-8, traduit en ukrainien en 2005 : Istoria Oukraïnskovo Kinemotografa, Kino-Kolo, Kiev, 2005, ISBN 966-8864-00-X
