= Amvrosy Buchma =

Ukrainian soviet actor and film director (1891–1957)

- Амвросій Бучма
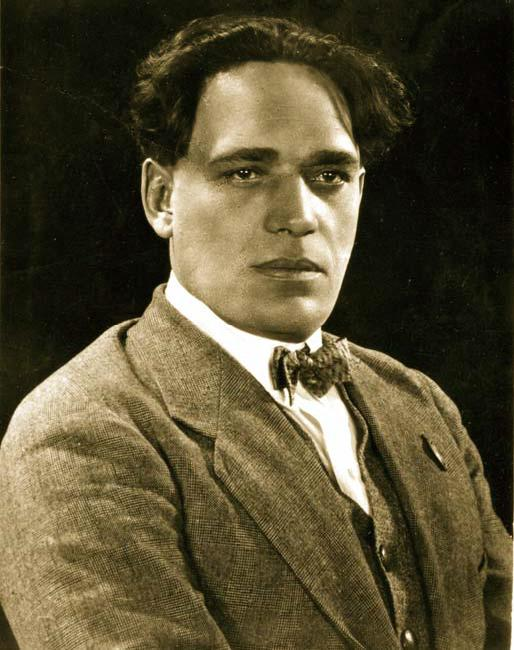
- Born: 14 February 1891; Lemberg, Austria-Hungary (present-day Lviv, Ukraine)
- Died: 6 January 1957 (aged 65); Kiev, Ukrainian SSR, Soviet Union
- Occupation: Actor
- Spouse: Valentyna Bzheska-Buchma

Amvrosy Maksymiliyanovych Buchma (Note: Ukrainian: Амвросій Максиміліанович Бучма, romanized: Amvrosii Maksymilianovych Buchma; Russian: Амвросий Максимилианович Бучма, romanized: Amvrosiy Maksimilianovich Buchma) (14 March 1891 – 6 January 1957) was a Ukrainian and Soviet stage and film actor, director and pedagogue. He stepped onto the stage professionally for the first time in 1905 with the Ruska Besida Theatre.

He was awarded with the People's Artist of the USSR in 1944.

== Life and career ==
Buchma was born into the family of a railway worker. He graduated from the Lysenko Institute in 1905, and worked as an extra in the Russkaia Beseda theater in Lvov until 1912. After serving in the Austro-Hungarian army in World War I, he returned to the stage and appeared in leading roles in Kharkiv and, since 1936, at the Ivan Franko Theater in Kyiv where he also worked as a director. Buchma made his film debut in 1924 in two satirical comedies by Les Kurbas: Vendetta, critical of the Church, and Macdonald, a about the British politician and his anti-Soviet activities (Buchma played the title role). The actor gained exposure with two films by Pyotr Chardynin: the biopic Taras Shevchenko (1926) in which he portrayed the Ukrainian poet, and the historical drama Taras Triasilo (1927). In 1929, Buchma had one of his most acclaimed roles as the German soldier going insane during a World War I gas attack in Aleksandr Dovzhenko’s Arsenal. The actor played the title role of Gordei Iaroshchuk in The Night Coachman (1928) directed by Georgi Tasin, which tells the story of an ordinary man who awakens politically and sacrifices his life to avenge for the murder of his daughter. Buchma, transitioned to sound film without great difficulty. Another performance by Buchma is the role of Taras, a man who refuses to give in to the Nazi occupants, in Mark Donskoy’s holocaust tragedy The Undefeated (1945). Buchma also starred in Sergei Eisenstein’s Ivan the Terrible (1943–1945) in the role of Aleksei Basmanov.

As director, Buchma helmed the silent Behind the Wall (1929), and a sound film in 1954, Earth (co-directed with A. Zhvachko).

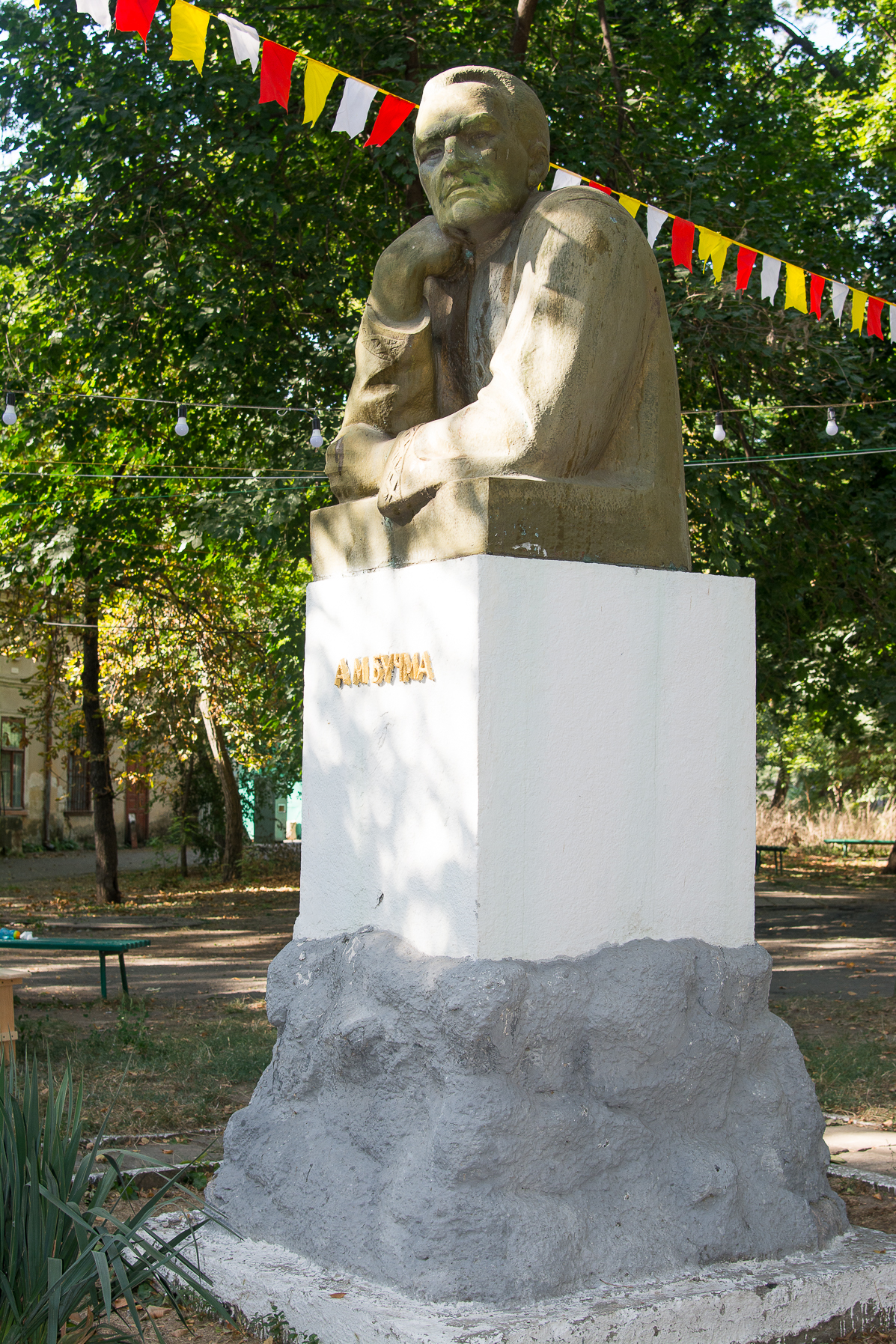
Monument of Amvrosy Buchma in Odessa

Buchma, a member of the Communist Party since 1942, was director of the Dovzhenko Film Studios from 1945 to 1948. Beginning in 1940, he taught at the Karpenko-Karii Theater Institute in Kyiv. Buchma received Stalin Prizes for his theater work in 1941 and 1949 and was named People’s Artist of the USSR in 1944.

== Filmography ==
Year	Title	Role	Notes
1925	Ukraziya	Cossack Colonel	
1927	Taras Tryasylo		
1927	Mykola Dzherya	Mykola	
1928	Prodanyi appetit		
1928	Dzhymmi Higgins	Jimmie Higgins	
1928	The Night Coachman	Hordiy Yaroshchuk	
1929	Arsenal	German soldier in glasses	
1934	Velyka hra		
1937	Nazar Stodolya	Foma Kychatyi – Hundred commander	
1939	Shchors	General Tereshkevych	Uncredited
1940	Veter s vostoka	Khoma Gabrys	
1944; 1958	Ivan the Terrible	Tsar's guard Aleksei Basmanov	
1945	The Unvanquished	Taras Yatsenko	
1946	V dalnem plavanii	botsman Dzyuba	
1947	Secret Agent	Leshchuk	
1952	Ukradene shchastia	Mykola Zadorozhnyi	
