= Margarita Barskaya =

Soviet actress, film director and screenwriter

- Маргарита Барская
- Born: 19 June 1903; Baku, Russian Empire (now Azerbaijan)
- Died: 23 July 1939 (aged 36)

Margarita Aleksandrovna Barskaya (Russian: Маргарита Александровна Барская; 19 June 1903 – 23 July 1939) was a Soviet actress, filmmaker, and screenwriter. She wrote the screenplays for and directed three films. She was married to director Pyotr Chardynin.

== Early life ==
Margarita Aleksandrovna Barskaya was born on 19 June 1903 in Baku. After her parents separated when she was six, Margarita and her two sisters were raised by their mother, who owned a hat store and provided lodging for actors. Barskaya graduated from the First Azerbaijan State Drama Studio when she was 19 and then joined the touring company Red Torch (Krasnyi fakel), where she was the lead actress of travesties under Vladimir Tatischev. While touring in Odessa, Barskaya was asked to become a film actress and met director Pyotr Chardynin. They married soon after.

== Film career ==
Barskaya took roles in Chardynin's films. She appeared in the 1922 film Modzgvari and Aleksandr Dovzhenko's first film, Love's Berries (1926). She was more drawn to the job of assistant director than that of a film actor, as "the cinema deprives the actor of his main weapon: the word." In 1926, Chardynin made a children's version of Taras Shevchenko at her urging. Towards the late 1920s Barskaya left her husband. She moved to Moscow in 1929 and turned her focus to children's film. Barskaya initiated the foundation of a film council at Narkompros and organized a children's section for the Association of Revolutionary Film-Workers.

In 1930, Barskaya directed her first film, Who's More Important, What's More Necessary. She made the educational film at Vostokkino in four months. The film received positive reviews and public interest increased when it was discovered that an animated sequence from the film was by Aleksandr Ivanov and that Valentin Pavlov was one of the three cameramen. The film was thought to be lost until its rediscovery in the Russian State Archive of Film and Photo Documents in 2008. Though the surviving copy is missing its credits, the remainder seems to have been preserved in its entirety.

Barskaya wrote the script for and directed the successful 1933 children's fiction film Torn Boots (Rvanye Bashmaki). Made by the German-Russian film company Mezhrabpomfilm, it is set in early Nazi Germany with its subject being the lives of German workers' children. It premiered alongside the Spanish film Call to Arms on 1 March in the Besant Hall, London. It was the first realistic Soviet film geared towards children.

Barskaya worked to secure a studio that specialized in children's cinema. She appealed to Lazar Kaganovich, who supervised Moscow's general reconstruction, and, in a letter dated 2 February 1935, to Joseph Stalin. She opened the Laboratory for Children's Cinema later that year.

Barskaya's third and final film, was 1937's Father and Son. It features a factory director who puts his work over educating his son, Boris. The portrayal of the son as unhappy and his father, a war hero, as a lazy parent was regarded as slanderous. After the film was removed from cinemas and Barskaya was fired from Soyuzdetfilm.

On July 23, 1939, she committed suicide by throwing herself into the flight of stairs of a film studio after a meeting at which she was actually excommunicated from the filmmaking profession. The official cause of suicide was never revealed.

She was buried at the Donskoye Cemetery.

== Filmography ==
=== As actor ===
- Modzgvari (1922)
- Simple Heart (Простые сердца; 1924)
- (Бабий Лог; 1925)
- (Генерал с того света; 1925)
- Salt (Соль; 1925)
- Love's Berries (Ягодка любви; 1926)
- Taras Shaken (Тарас Трясило; 1927)

=== As director and screenwriter ===
- Who's More Important, What's More Necessary (Кто важнее — что нужнее; 1930)
- Torn Boots (Рваные башмаки; 1933)
- Father and Son (Отец и сын; 1937)
