= All-Ukrainian Photo Cinema Administration =

Ukrainian film production agency (1922–1930)

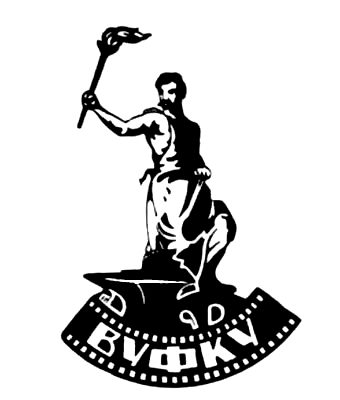
- 1922 logo
- Native name: Всеукраїнське фотокіноуправління
- Type: Film studio
- Industry: Film industry
- Founded: 13 March 1922; 104 years ago
- Defunct: 9 November 1930
- Successor: Ukrainefilm
- Headquarters: Kharkiv, Ukrainian Soviet Socialist Republic
- Website: vufku.org

The All-Ukrainian Photo Cinema Administration (Ukrainian: Всеукраїнське фото кіноуправління, romanized: Vse-Ukrainske Foto Kino Upravlinnia, or ВУФКУ, VUFKU) was a cinematographic state monopoly that united the entire film industry in Ukraine between 1922 and 1930. VUFKU was vertically integrated: it controlled production, distribution, and exhibition of films.

== History ==
VUFKU was established on 13 March 1922 under the National Commissar of Education of the Ukrainian SSR. A directive issued by the Commissar and the NKVD (Narodnyi komissariat vnutrennikh del) on 22 April 1922 brought all movie theatres and all institutions and companies of photo and film industries located in Ukraine under the jurisdiction of VUFKU.

VUFKU became the owner of a large studio in Odesa, and two small studios (called ateliers) in Kyiv and Kharkiv. It also leased a studio from the Crimean Commissar of Education in Yalta. In 1929, the largest VUFKU film studio opened in Kyiv. Four films were produced in 1923, 16 in 1924, 20 in 1927, 36 in 1928, and 31 in 1929. In these years the technical-manufacturing personnel of the studios increased from 47 in 1923 to 1,000 in 1929.

The number of movie theaters saw similar expansion, from 265 in 1914 to 5,394 in 1928.

On November 9, 1930, VUFKU was canceled as a Ukrainian state institution by the decision of the Presidium of the Supreme Soviet of the National Economy. On December 13, 1930, a state-owned Ukrainian Trust of Cinema Industry "Ukrainafilm" was created on the basis of VUFKU.

== Activity ==
=== Feature films ===
In the period from 1921 to 1929 in Ukraine, the true national cinema was developed by the directors of Les Kurbas, Vladimir Gardin, Pyotr Chardynin, Georgi Stabovoi, Dziga Vertov, Alexander Dovzhenko, Ivan Kawaleridze and others.

Beginning in 1925, VUFKU invited German cinematographers to cooperate. A Turkish director of Muhsin Ertuğrul also worked at the Odesa Film Studio for a while (the film "Spartak", 1926) and Oleksandr Granovsky, founder of the Jewish theater in Russia, who made at the "Jewish Happiness" there.

After 1926, most of Ukrainian writers, journalists, playwrights, photographers, decorator artists were involved into work.

In 1927 and 1928, several films gained an international recognition: "Two days" (1927) by Georgi Stabovoi, filmed at the Yalta Film Factory and "Zvenigora" by Alexander Dovzhenko, made at the Odesa Film Factory.

Vladimir Mayakovsky came twice to Ukraine, in 1922, and then between 1926 and 1928, in order to screen his scenarios.

Several famous films were made during 1928-1929 like Man with a Movie Camera by Dziga Vertov, Arsenal by Alexander Dovzhenko etc.

=== Culturfilms ===
Most of the film production at the beginning of the VUFKU (at least 165 movies for the first three years) consisted of science fiction, agricultural, anti-religious, educational films.

In 1926, in the magazine "Kino", Hlib Zatvornytskyy mentioned three main types of culture movies: a school film, science fiction and newsreel.

=== Animation cinematography ===
In 1926, an animation studio was launched by Vyacheslav Levadovsky and Volodymyr Devyatnin with the painters Simka Huyetsky, Ipolit Lazarchuk and others.

== List of films ==
- 1926: The Trypillia Tragedy (Russian: Трипольская трагедия), directed by Alexander Anoschenko-Anoda (silent film)
- 1926: Love's Berries (Ukrainian: Ягідка кохання), directed by Alexander Dovzhenko (silent film)
- 1926: Taras Shevchenko (Ukrainian: Тарас Шевченко), directed by Pyotr Chardynin (silent film)
- 1927: The Diplomatic Pouch (Ukrainian: Сумка дипкур'єра), directed by Alexander Dovzhenko (silent film)
- 1928: Arsenal (Ukrainian: Арсенал), directed by Alexander Dovzhenko (silent film)
- 1928: Zvenyhora (Ukrainian: Звенигора), directed by Alexander Dovzhenko (silent film)
- 1928: Leather Man (Ukrainian: Шкурник), directed by Mykola Shpykovsky (silent film)
- 1929: Man with a Movie Camera (Ukrainian: Людина з кіноапаратом), directed by Dziga Vertov (documentary film)
- 1929: In Spring (Ukrainian: Навесні), directed by Mikhail Kaufman (documentary film)
- 1930: Earth (Ukrainian: Земля), directed by Alexander Dovzhenko (silent film)

== Directors ==
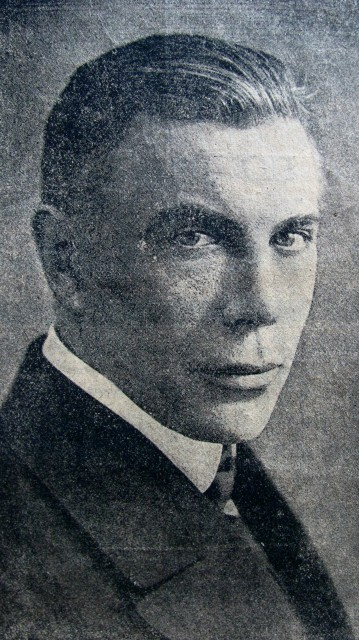
Pyotr Chardynin

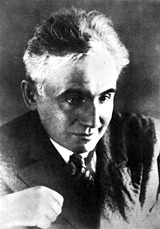
Les Kurbas

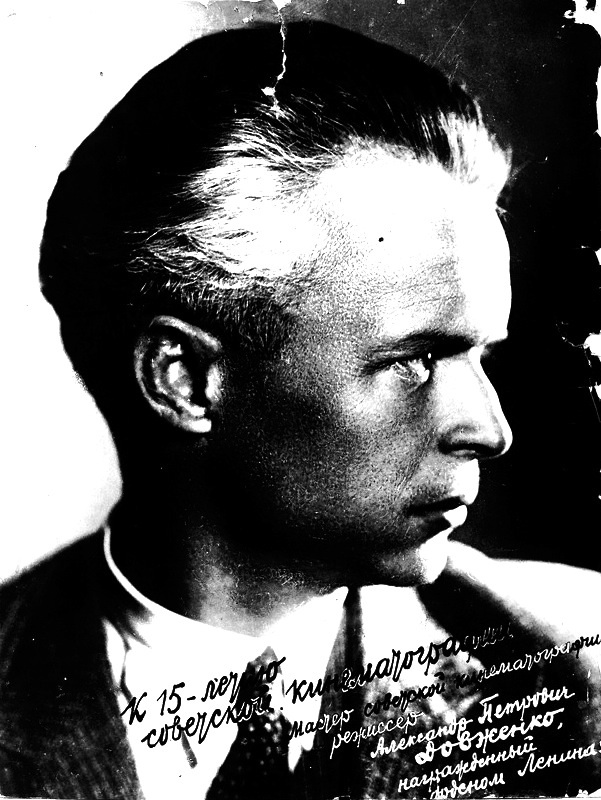
Alexander Dovzhenko

== See also ==
- Cinema of Ukraine
- Odesa Film Studio
- Dovzhenko Film Studios
