= Zemla =

Zemla, Žemla, Zemła, or Żemła may refer to

- Zemla Intifada (Zemla Uprising), disturbances in 1970 in the Zemla district in Sahara
- Anna Żemła-Krajewska (born 1979), Polish judoka
- Gustaw Zemła (born 1931), Polish sculptor
- Ladislav Žemla (1887–1955), Czech tennis player

== See also ==
- Zemlya (disambiguation)
