= Holos Ukrayiny =

Ukrainian government gazette

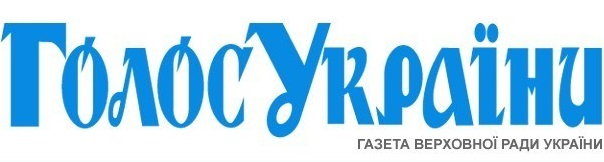

Holos Ukrayiny (Ukrainian: Голос України, lit. 'Voice of Ukraine') is a Ukrainian daily newspaper published in Kyiv. Laws adopted by the Verkhovna Rada of Ukraine must be published in Holos Ukrayiny and come into force the next day.

== History and profile ==
Holos Ukrayiny is the official voice of Verkhovna Rada (parliament of Ukraine), partially funded by the state. It is mandated to provide all parliamentary factions with the regular equal proportions of printing space. The paper is also one of the so-called official publications – newspapers and bulletins authorized to publish Ukrainian legislation.

Holos Ukrayiny also has a Russian edition named Golos Ukrainy (Russian: Голос Украины).

In 1994, Holos Ukrayiny had a circulation of 302,937 copies. It was 517,444 copies in 1995 and 331,925 copies in 1996. It became 277,688 copies in 1997 and 252,509 copies in 1998. The 1999 circulation of the paper was 204,694 copies.

According to the Laws of Ukraine "On the Procedure for Coverage of Public Authorities and Local Self-Government Bodies in Ukraine by Mass Media" and "On the Rules of Procedure of the Verkhovna Rada of Ukraine", the newspaper officially publishes: Laws of Ukraine signed by the President of Ukraine; resolutions of the Verkhovna Rada of Ukraine and other acts of the Verkhovna Rada of Ukraine signed by the Chairman of the Verkhovna Rada of Ukraine. Other regulations may also be published.

== See also ==
- List of newspapers in Ukraine
- Visti, Soviet Ukrainian government gazette 1918–1941
