= Arsenal (1929 film) =

1929 film by Oleksandr Dovzhenko

- Stenberg brothers' film poster
- Directed by: Alexander Dovzhenko
- Written by: Alexander Dovzhenko
- Produced by: Alexander Dovzhenko
- Starring: Semyon Svashenko; Nikolai Nademsky; Amvrosy Buchma; Les Podorozhnij
- Cinematography: Danylo Demutsky
- Music by: Igor Belza
- Distributed by: Odessa Film Factory of VUFKU
- Release date: February 25, 1929
- Running time: 92 min.
- Country: Soviet Union
- Languages: Silent film Russian and Ukrainian intertitles

Arsenal (Russian: Арсенал; Ukrainian: Арсенал; alternate title: January Uprising in Kiev in 1918) is a 1929 silent Soviet drama film by Alexander Dovzhenko. The film depicts events following the 1917 October Revolution in Russia and the subsequent Russian Civil War, and is a highly symbolic and poetic portrayal of the revolutionary spirit and the struggle for power. The film was shot at Odessa Film Factory of VUFKU by cameraman Danyl Demutskyi and used original sets made by Volodymyr Muller. The expressionist imagery, camera work and original drama were said to take the film far beyond the usual propaganda and made it one of the most important pieces of Ukrainian avant-garde cinema. The film was made in 1928 and released early in 1929. It is the second film in Dovzhenko's "Ukraine Trilogy", the first being Zvenigora (1928) and the third being Earth (1930).

The film concerns an episode in the Russian Civil War in 1918 in which the Kiev Arsenal January Uprising of workers aided the besieging Bolshevik army against the Ukrainian People's Republic’s Central Rada council who held legal power in Ukraine at the time. Dovzhenko himself had participated in the conflict, but on the side of Central Rada.

== Plot ==
First part of Arsenal (1929)

The central figure is a young worker named Timosh, who returns to his hometown of Kiev after serving in the Tsarist army during World War I. He witnesses the exploitation of the workers and the extreme poverty caused by the war and the capitalist system. Inspired by the ideals of the revolution, Timosh becomes actively involved in the Bolshevik movement.

Timosh and his comrades organize the workers and peasants in Kiev, preparing for an uprising against the ruling bourgeoisie. The film showcases the escalating tensions, political intrigues, and class struggles during the revolution, the January uprising of workers in Kiev, their confrontation with gangs of haidamak paramilitaries serving the bourgeois Central Rada of the Ukrainian People's Republic, and the massacre of the rebels.

A series of vignettes portray the struggles, sacrifices, and heroism of the common people. The collective power of the proletariat and their fight for liberation from oppressive forces are showcased. The film also explores the contrast between the working class and the bourgeoisie, highlighting the brutality and corruption of the ruling class.

The narrative of Arsenal is non-linear, employing poetic and metaphorical imagery to convey its message. The film includes symbolic scenes that represent the spirit of the revolution, such as a statue of a Cossack warrior coming to life and an allegorical figure of death. It also incorporates documentary footage to further emphasize the historical context and the real-life events that inspired the story.

== Cast ==
- Semyon Svashenko — Timosha
- Georgiy Kharkiv — Red Army
- Amvrosy Buchma — German soldier in glasses
- Dmitri Erdman — a German officer
- Sergey Petrov — a German soldier
- K. Mikhailovsky — nationalist
- Alexander Evdakov — Nicholas II
- Andrei Mikhailovsky — nationalist

== Reception ==
In the early 1970s, the Anthology Film Archives selected the film for its collection of essential cinema. In a 2011 poll of film critics by the Bureau of Ukrainian Film Journalism and the Union of Cinematographers of Ukraine, Arsenal was placed at #11 in a list of the 15 best films in the history of Ukrainian cinema. In its 2021 list of the 100 best films in the history of Ukrainian cinema, the National Oleksandr Dovzhenko Film Centre placed Arsenal at #27.
