= Zemlya =

Zemlya may refer to:

- Earth (1930 film), or Zemlya
- Ze (Cyrillic), or Zemlya, in the Early Cyrillic alphabet
- R-11 Zemlya, a Soviet tactical ballistic missile

== See also ==
- Zemlja (disambiguation)
