= Museum of the Cinema (Odesa, Ukraine) =

Coordinates: 46°29′N 30°44′E

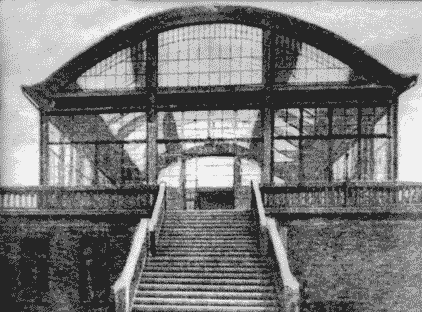
Pavilion of Odesa museum of the cinema

The museum of cinema — a section of NUCU (National Union of Cinematography) is located on the Odesa film studio, in a historic mansion in Odesa. Before the revolution, it belonged to Demidovoy – San-Donato family.

With more than 10,000 works on display, the museum is a testimony to the history and cinematic activity in Odesa. Here can be found historic materials, from the invention of cinema, to the postmodern, digital and avant-garde.

A popular attraction, measuring 28 square metres, in one room – explores the invention of the cinema (two years prior to the Brothers Lumière!).

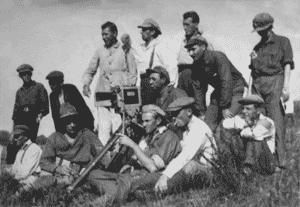
Soviet directors of photography

These films, by Joseph Timchenko, were produced for a survey and demonstration of FMV, and are the first in the Odesa Film Studios of «Mirograf», «Mizrakh», Borisova, Kharitonova and others. The Odesa Film Studio produced feature films until 1941, when the Soviet Union entered the Second World War.

The shelves are filled to the ceiling with artifacts.

The Museum offers individual consultations for students. In recent years, students have written papers on the history of the cinema and the development of culture in the town of Odesa.

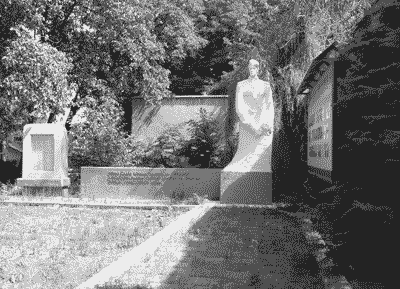
The monument to the workers of Odesa Film Studio

They have also researched and published an annotated, illustrated catalogue of the films of Odesa (from 1917 to 2004). A reference book is in preparation about all producers, works and workings on a studio. The Museum monographs are published from Kira Muratova, Vladimir Vysockiy, Vasiliy Reshetnikov, Ljudmila Popova.

Head of Museum of the cinema was professor of culture — Kostromenko Vadim (As director from 1996 until 2017)

== Current archive and cataloguing efforts ==
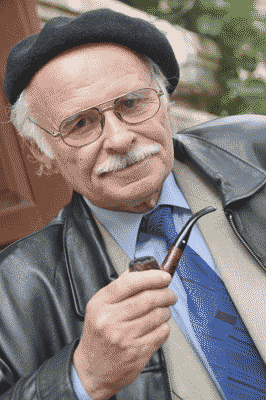
Vadim Kostomarenko - Former head of Museum of the cinema, professor of culture

The Museum of the Cinema is continuously studying and cataloguing material. Its archives include:

- Rare literature: books, newspapers, magazines about the cinema from 1900
- Personal paraphernalia of the first heads of the Odesa studio — Michael Kapchinsky, Lazarus Polyak, Gennady Zbandut, producers of the studio of Alexander Dovzhenko, Ivan Kavaleridze, George Tasin, Kira Muratova, Michael Kac, Radomir Vasilevsky.
- Personal paraphernalia of the actors of Amvrosiya Buchma - Vera Kholodnaya, Vladimir Vysocky, Yaroslav Lupiya, Vilen Novak, Vadim Kostromenko and others.
- Cinematographic equipment: unique apparatus which Dovzhenko worked on
- Survey and sound-recording devices, lighting, assembling adaptations, film projectors and other.
- Dossiers on every rental and television film, taken off the studios from 1954, consisting of literary, producer scenarios, assembly records of films, complete sets of publicity pictures, and press reviews.
- Sketches of sceneries and suits on all films from post-war years.
- Raising projects to the films (147 albums).
- Castings (96 albums).
- Card index of actors, recorded on the Odesa film studio.
- Photos of all who worked and are still working on the studio — producers, operators, sound engineers, artists etc.
- Audio of the most interesting events (a film festival «Golden Dyuk» etc.).
- Video films and videotape recordings of flashbacks, movies of the studio on 16-mm tape and video transmitters.
- Memoirs of studio workers — published and unpublished.
- A musical library with autographs of the composers, writing for a studio.
- Placards to the films of the Odesa film studio.
- Prizes and rewards to the studio films.
- Collection of marks, envelopes, devoted cinemas.
- Informative-methodical materials on different historical epochs: suits are both civil and military — signs of distinction of different armies, transport, cars, notes, models etc.
