= The Night Coachman =

1928 film

- Russian: Ночной извозчик
- Directed by: Georgi Tasin
- Written by: Moses Zats
- Starring: Amvrosi Buchma; Maria Dyusimeter; Nikolai Nademsky; Yu. Shumsky; Karl Tomski
- Cinematography: Albert Kyun
- Release date: 1928
- Country: Soviet Union
- Language: Russian

The Night Coachman (Russian: Ночной извозчик) is a 1928 Soviet film directed by Georgi Tasin.

== Plot ==
The film takes place in Odessa during the Civil War. Cab driver Gordei informs his daughter Katia, as a result of which she is arrested.

== Cast ==
- Amvrosi Buchma as Gordej Yaroshchuk
- Maria Dyusimeter as Katia
- Nikolai Nademsky as Cossack
- Yu. Shumsky as Secret Police officer
- Karl Tomski as Boris

== Reception ==
In its 2021 list of the 100 best films in the history of Ukrainian cinema, the National Oleksandr Dovzhenko Film Centre placed The Night Coachman at #74.
