= Zemlja =

Zemlja ('earth' or 'land' in Serbia-Croatian languages) may refer to:

- Ze (Cyrillic), or Zemlja, in the Early Cyrillic alphabet
- Zemlja (feudal Bosnia), a South Slavic feudal unit in the medieval Balkans
- Grega Žemlja (born 1986), Slovenian tennis player

== See also ==
- Earth (1930 film), or Zemlya
