= Zvenigora =

1928 film

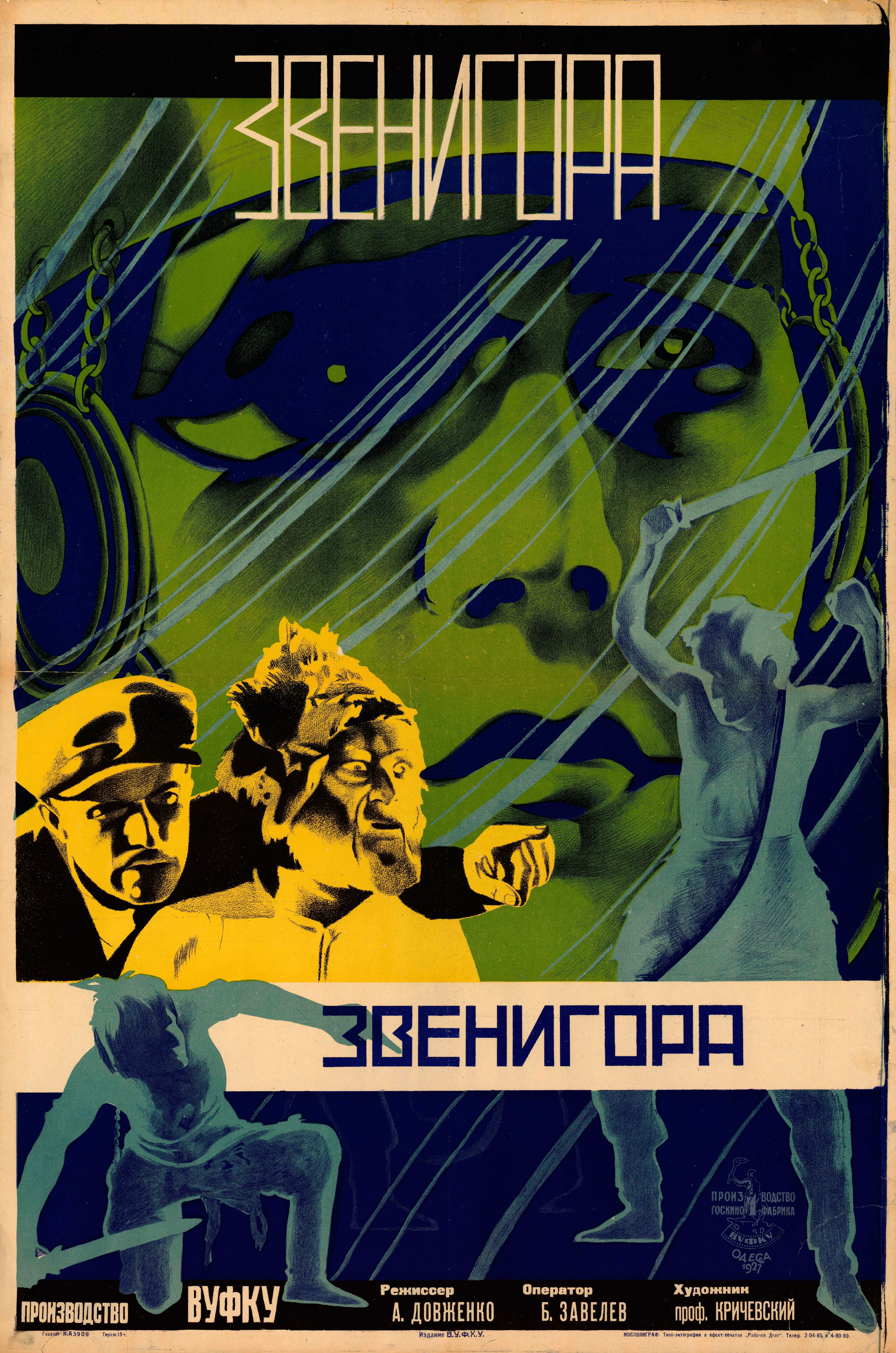
- Film poster
- Directed by: Alexander Dovzhenko
- Written by: Maik "Mike" Johansen; Yurtyk (Yuri Tiutiunnyk); Alexander Dovzhenko
- Starring: Semyon Svashenko; Nikolai Nademsky; Georgi Astafyev; Les Podorozhnij
- Cinematography: Boris Zavelev
- Edited by: Alexander Dovzhenko
- Production company: VUFKU
- Distributed by: Mosfilm
- Release date: 13 April 1928
- Running time: 91 min.
- Country: Soviet Union
- Languages: silent film Russian intertitles

Zvenigora (1928) by Alexander Dovzhenko

Zvenigora (Russian: Звeнигopа) is a 1928 Soviet silent film by Ukrainian director Alexander Dovzhenko, first shown on 13 April 1928. This was the fourth film by Dovzhenko, but the first one which was widely reviewed and discussed in the media. This was also the last film by Dovzhenko for which he was not the sole scriptwriter.

== Cast ==
- Georgi Astafyev as Scythian leader (as G. Astafyev)
- Nikolai Nademsky as Grandpa / General
- Vladimir Uralsky as Peasant
- Aleksandr Podorozhny as Pavlo - second grandson (as Les Podorozhnij)
- Semyon Svashenko as Timoshka - first grandson
- I. Selyuk as Ataman
- L. Barné as Monk
- L. Parshina as Timoshka's wife
- P. Sklyar Otawa as Okasana — Mountain Princess
- A. Simonov as Cossack Officer

== Production ==
The script was originally written by Maik "Mike" Johansen and Yurtyk (Yuri Tiutiunnyk), but eventually Dovzhenko heavily rewrote the script himself and removed Johansen and Tyutyunnyk's names from the screenplay and did not include them in the film credits. Pavlo Nechesa, head of the Odesa film studio VUFKU (Ukrainian: Одеська кінфабрика ВУФКУ) recalls: ″We were discussing the screenplay for Zvenigora … Almost everyone was against the script … Dovzhenko said ″I’ll take and make …″. As a project, Zvenigora got its start in June 1927.

== Plot ==
Regarded as a silent revolutionary epic, Dovzhenko's initial film in his Ukraine Trilogy (along with Arsenal and Earth) is almost religious in tone, relating a millennium of Ukrainian history through the story of an old man who tells his grandson about a treasure buried in a mountain. The film mixes fiction and reality.

Although Dovzhenko referred to Zvenigora as his "party membership card", the relationship between the individual and nature is the main theme of the film, which is highly atypical of Soviet cinema of the end of the 1920s with its avant-garde influences. Dovzhenko states that full submission to nature made humanity powerless in the face of it, and understanding and control of nature is required to make progress. For him, the October Revolution brought about such an understanding.

== Reception ==
In 1927, even before the film's release, the newspaper Kino (Cinema) sharply criticized the screenplay, calling it "bourgeois" and "nationalistic".The film made the young director famous and made a great impression on Sergei Eisenstein and Vsevolod Pudovkin, but the innovative methods in the work of the director of the future VUFKU representatives in Moscow say about Zvenigora: "No one can understand anything." Eisenstein said after watching Zvenigora: “Today, for a moment, it was possible to dim the lantern of Diogenes: a man stood in front of us ...”, “Master of his face. Master of his genre. A master of his individuality… a man who created something new in cinema.”

In the early 1970s, the Anthology Film Archives selected the film for its collection of essential cinema. In a 2008 survey by Seans magazine, Russian film critic Nikolai Izvolov listed Zvenigora third among his 10 favourite films. In the 2012 Sight & Sound Director's Poll of the Greatest Films of All Time, Guy Maddin placed it on his top ten list, describing the film as "mind-bogglingly eccentric!" In its 2021 list of the 100 best films in the history of Ukrainian cinema, the National Oleksandr Dovzhenko Film Centre placed Zvenigora at #19.

== Bibliography ==
- Histoire du cinéma ukrainien (1896–1995), Lubomir Hosejko, Éditions à Dié, Dié, 2001, ISBN 978-2-908730-67-8, traduit en ukrainien en 2005 : Istoria Oukraïnskovo Kinemotografa, Kino-Kolo, Kyiv, 2005, ISBN 966-8864-00-X
