= Love's Berries =

1926 film by Oleksandr Dovzhenko

Ягoдка любви / Ягідка кохання (Love's Berries)
- Directed by: Oleksandr Dovzhenko
- Written by: Oleksandr Dovzhenko
- Starring: Margarita Chardynina-Barska; Dmitri Kapka; Maryan Krushelnytsky; Nikolai Nademsky; Ivan Zamychkovsky
- Cinematography: Danylo Demutsky
- Edited by: Oleksandr Dovzhenko
- Distributed by: VUFKU-Odessa
- Release date: 1926
- Running time: 25 minutes
- Country: Soviet Union
- Languages: Silent film Russian intertitles

Love's Berries (Russian: «Ягoдка любви», romanized: Yagodka lyubvi, Ukrainian: «Ягідка кохання», romanized: Yahidka kokhannia) is a 1926 Soviet comedy film by Ukrainian director Oleksandr Dovzhenko. The film was Dovzhenko's debut, and the screenplay was written in three days. It deals with a dandified barber's attempts to get rid of his "love berry" — his illegitimate offspring.

== Plot ==
Hairdresser Jean Colbasiuc learns from his girlfriend about an unexpected materialization of their child. Not ready to be a father, the young man tries to get rid of the baby left in his care. After a few unsuccessful attempts to place the baby onto unsuspecting citizens, by this time Colbasiuc receives a notice from the People's Court, agrees to the registration of marriage and only then learns from Lisa that the child, who served as a catalyst for the incident, was borrowed by her from her Aunt.

== Cast ==
- Maryan Krushelnitsky as Jean Kolbacjuk (as Maryan Krushchelnitsky)
- Margarita Barskaya as Young woman
- Dmitriy Kapka as Toys salesman
- Ivan Zamychkovsky as Tolstjak
- Volodimir Lisovsky as Old man on whom the fat man offloads
- A. Belov as Fat client
- L. Chembarsky as Fop on whom the fat man offloads
- N. Zemgano as Photographer
- K. Zapadnaia as Girl on the boulevard
- Nikolai Nademsky as Seltzer water salesman
