= Dizzy with Success =

1930 newspaper article by I. Stalin

"Dizzy with Success: Concerning Questions of the Collective-Farm Movement" (Russian: Головокруже́ние от успе́хов. К вопро́сам колхо́зного движе́ния, romanized: Golovokruzhéniye ot uspékhov. K voprósam kolkhóznogo dvizhéniya) is an article by Joseph Stalin that was published in Pravda on March 2, 1930. In the article, Stalin claimed that agricultural collectivization had been carried out with excessive zeal, leading to "excesses" that had to be corrected.

Currently the expression is used in Russian language as a catchphrase in reference to arrogance, self-delusion, euphoria, and the inability to soberly perceive reality due to the lack of self-criticism.
