= The Diplomatic Pouch =

1927 Soviet silent thriller film

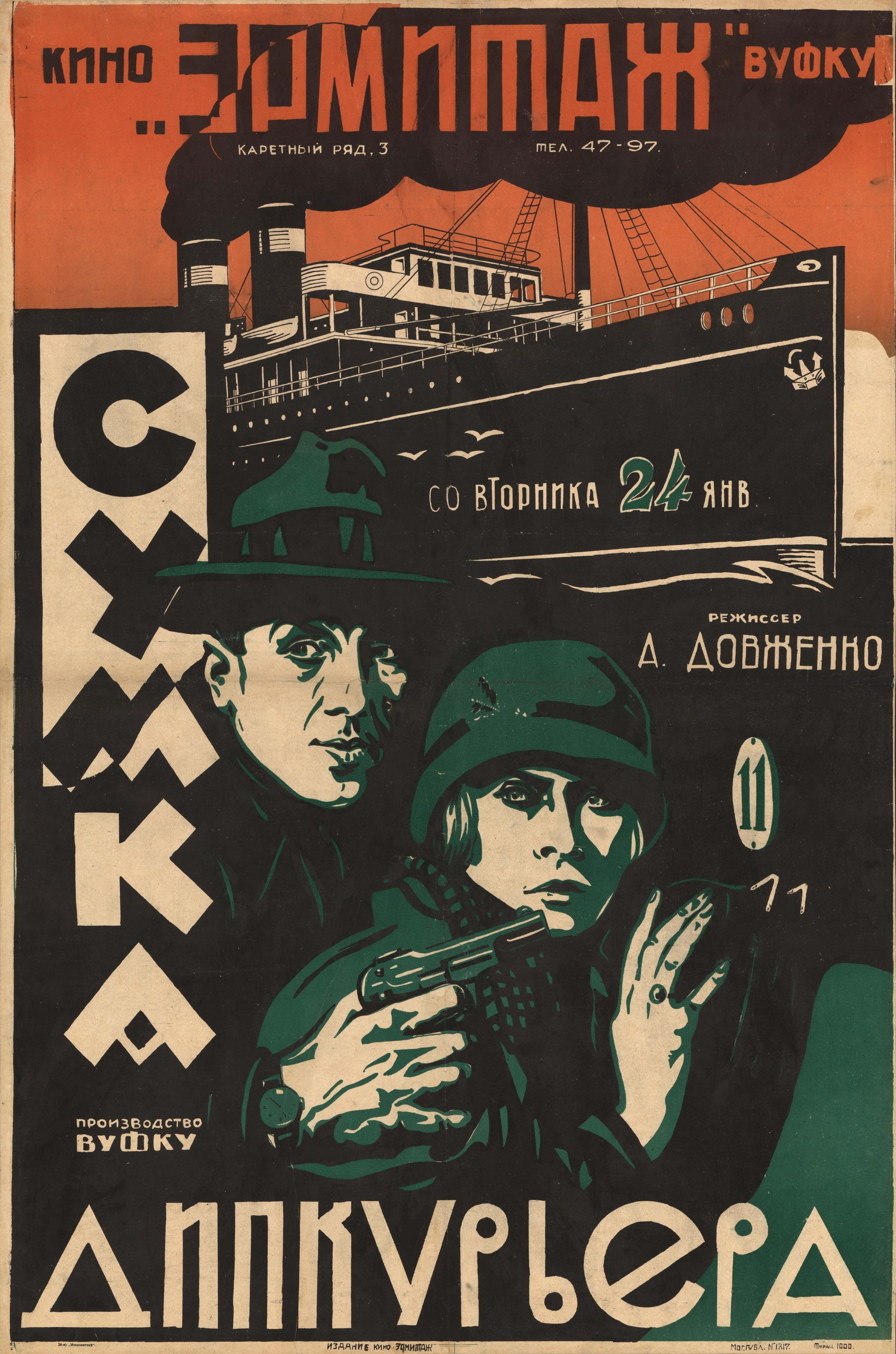
- Directed by: Oleksandr Dovzhenko
- Written by: Oleksandr Dovzhenko; Boris Shcharansky; Yurij Yanovskyi; Moisei Zats
- Produced by: Oleksandr Dovzhenko
- Starring: M. Buyukli; A. Klymenko; Heorhii Zelondzhev-Shypov; Ida Penzo; Boris Zagorsky
- Cinematography: Nikolai Kozlovsky
- Production company: All-Ukrainian Photo Cinema Administration (VUFKU)
- Release date: 1927
- Running time: 62 minutes
- Country: Soviet Union
- Language: Russian

The Diplomatic Pouch (Russian: «Сумка дипкурьера», romanized: Sumka dipkuryera) is a 1927 Soviet silent thriller film directed by Oleksandr Dovzhenko. The first two parts of the film are lost.

== Premise ==
The film's plot is based on the real murder of the Soviet diplomatic courier Theodor Nette abroad. The pouch of the Soviet diplomat, which is stolen by British spies, is taken away by the sailors of a ship sailing to Leningrad who deliver it to the authorities. The intelligence agents make every effort to retrieve the bag.

== Plot ==
The first and second parts of the film are lost. In these, the Soviet embassy in England dispatches two couriers carrying diplomatic mail to Leningrad. On the train, they are attacked by Inspector White of the secret police and a group of officers.

At night near Portsmouth, a railway watchman discovers the two couriers: one is dead, and the other is wounded. The surviving courier is taken home by the watchman and entrusts his son, Harry, with delivering the documents to the Soviet Union before dying. Shortly afterward, Inspector White locates the courier, searches him, and realizes he is too late. Threatening the watchman's wife with a pistol, White forces her to reveal her son's destination and sets off in pursuit.

The briefcase with the documents ends up on the ship Victoria, bound for the Soviet Union. Bolshevik-supporting sailors on board learn about the important cargo and vow to protect it at all costs. The ship encounters a storm, during which White and his accomplices catch up. While the sailors rest in their quarters, a telegraph message from White orders Victoria to remain in Dover until his arrival.

Upon docking in Dover, the sailors head to a local tavern while White searches the ship's quarters, failing to locate the documents. He bribes a sailor to spy on the crew and find out where the briefcase is hidden. Realizing the ship has been searched, the sailors devise a plan to hide the documents among the belongings of a ballerina, a passenger on the Victoria. They stage a fight, during which they plant the briefcase with the ballerina.

White convinces the ballerina to extract information from the bosun about the documents’ location. When she notices the bosun's reaction, she realizes the papers are in one of her suitcases. However, before she can act, White arrives, chases off the bosun, and searches her belongings but still finds nothing. Later, the ballerina discovers the papers in another suitcase and attempts to deliver them to White, but a sailor intercepts her and throws the documents into the boiler room.

White gathers the sailors, accusing them of theft. His accomplice deduces that the briefcase is with the stoker and forcibly takes it, but when he brings it to White, they discover it is empty. White tries bribing the stoker, who angrily throws the money back in his face and leaves. The sailors then capture White and his accomplice, throwing them overboard. Despite stopping the ship to rescue them, the sailors deliberately fail to save the men.

Victoria resumes its journey to Leningrad, and one sailor reveals to another that he had the briefcase all along.

== Production ==
Dovzhenko was invited to stage the film because of his knowledge of the diplomatic sphere; he also used to work as a diplomatic courier. Under the influence of the German cinema school, he fills the movie with clichés borrowed from German crime fiction: a brawl in the compartment of an international express train and on its steps, a fight on the deck of the ship, a steamer pursuing the boat, and so on. Many of the genre's stock characters appear: spies, prostitutes, police agents, visitors of port pubs, and jazz bands.

At this time, cinematographer Nikolai Kozlovsky introduces Dovzhenko to cropping techniques. The film features images with a lot of unusual angles, night shooting and expressionistic effects (using optical prisms).

Dovzhenko appears on screen, for the only time in his career, as a ship's stoker. In the film there is a scene where inspector White offers money to the stoker, who throws it back into his face. A very similar thing happened in Dovzhenko's life: once a man came to him for an appointment at work, who wanted monetary help because he suffered under the Bolsheviks. He even had with him a letter of recommendation written by the Empress Maria Feodorovna. After reading, Dovzhenko "neatly folded the sheets and threw them in the face of the degenerate", then banged his fist on the table and screamed.

== Reception ==
"The Diplomatic Pouch" was made with high production values at the level typical of 1920s adventure films. It was well received by the audience, who watched it with pleasure and the film was in the cinemas for a long time and was also shown abroad. But Dovzhenko had not yet found his signature style; he called the film "a pathetic attempt at writing."

== Cast ==
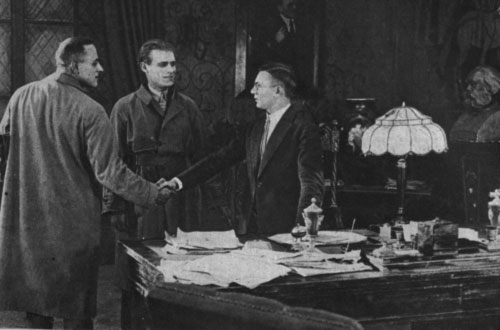
Heorhii Zelondzhev-Shypov (left) in The Diplomatic Pouch

- M. Buyukli as Embassy Secretary
- A. Klymenko as First Diplomatic Courier
- Heorhii Zelondzhev-Shypov as nd. Diplomatic Courier
- Ida Penzo as Helen Viskovska
- Boris Zagorsky as Spy
- Sergei Minin as Inspector White
- H. Skoretskyi as Harry
- Ivan Kapralov as Ralph
- V. Komaretskyi as Captain of Ship 'Victoria'
- Aleksandr Dovzhenko as Stoker
- Dmytro Kapka as Passenger
- Konstantin Eggert as Sailor-Boxer
