= Dovzhenko Film Studios =

Ukrainian film company

National cinema studio of feature films named after Oleksandr Dovzhenko
- Industry: Motion Pictures
- Founded: 1927
- Headquarters: Kyiv, Ukraine
- Key people: Andriy Donchyk (CEO)
- Products: Motion Pictures

Immovable Monument of National Significance of Ukraine
- Official name: Комплекс споруд Національної кіностудії імені О. Довженка (Кінофабрика ВУФКУ, 9 Всеукраїнське фото-кіноуправління) (Complex of buildings of the Oleksandr Dovzhenko National Cinema Studio (Cinema Studio VUFKU, 9th All-Ukrainian Photo-Cinema Directorate))
- Type: History, Science and Technology
- Reference no.: 260039-Н

The Dovzhenko Film Studios (Ukrainian: Національна кіностудія художніх фільмів імені О. Довженка, romanized: Natsionalna kinostudiia khudozhnikh filmiv imeni O. Dovzhenka) is a Ukrainian and former Soviet film production studio in UkrSSR and later Ukraine that was named after the Soviet film producer, Oleksandr Dovzhenko, in 1957. With the fall of the Soviet Union, the studio became a property of the government of Ukraine. In 2000, the film studio was awarded national status. It is one of the oldest and largest film studios in Ukraine.

== History ==
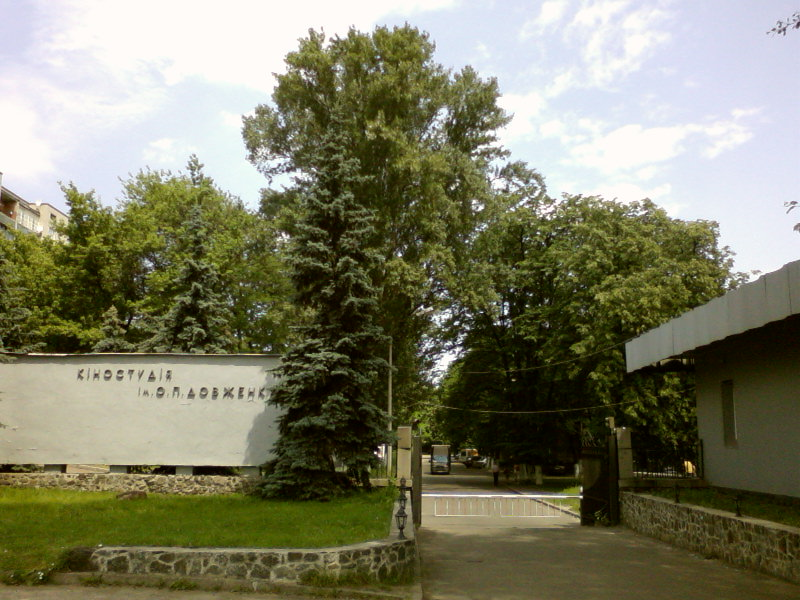
Main entrance to Dovzhenko Film Studios

The studios began in the 1920s when the All-Ukrainian Photo-Cinema-Directorate (VUFKU) announced a project proposition for the construction of a cinema factory in 1925. Out of 20 of them was chosen the project of Valerian Rykov, who led his architect group composed of students of the Architectural Department of Kyiv Art Institute in the construction of the O. Dovzhenko Film Studios beginning in 1927. It was at the time the largest in the Ukrainian SSR. Although the filming pavilions were still unfinished a year later, movie production had begun. Many memorial plates are within the studios in memory of the many film producers who had once worked here. One film pavilion is named Shchorsivskyi, because Oleksandr Dovzhenko shot his film Shchors there. This area of the studios is used as a museum.

The first movie of the film studio was "Ivanko and the Butcher" by director Aksel Lundin and cameraman A. Meines. Filming began on October 12, 1927, and took place at night, as pavilions were being built during the day. Many talented directors have come to the studio since the first films were shot — Oleksandr Dovzhenko, Arnold Kordium, Pavlo Dolyna, Leonid Lukov, Ivan Kavaleridze, Igor Savchenko, Favst Lopatynskyi; operators — Danylo Demutskyi, Yurii Yekelchyk, Mykola Topchii, Yozef Rona, I. Shekker, Oleksii Pankratiev; writers — Mykola Bazhan, Oleksandr Korniichuk, Hordii Brasiuk, V. Okhrimenko. It immediately affected the number and quality of the works and the variety of movie genres. In 1929, 10 films were already made.

Since 1930, cinema has become under the control of the state and has served to spread the ideology of communism among the population. Still, the 1930s for the Kyiv Film Factory were important years of formation.

In October 1941, the studio was evacuated to Tashkent, where it will continue its activities until the liberation of Kyiv. During the German occupation of Kyiv, the studio premises were used as a production base for the creation of propaganda films by the Ukraine Film Society.

The apple orchard on the side of the avenue near the studios was planted by the order of Dovzhenko himself. In 1957, it was named in memory of Oleksandr Dovzhenko.

Since 1987, the Debut, specialized in the first films of directors. His managers were Alexander Adolov (until 1990) and Arthur Voattsky (after 1990).

In December 2009, a studio for the digital restoration of Ukrainian films was opened on the complex.

On 15 June 2026, the studio was attacked in a Russian strike on Kyiv, destroying a costume collection that contained approximately 100 thousand outfits and three million articles of clothing. Other buildings on the studio premises were also damaged. Russia claimed the studio had a production facility for Ukrainian drones.

The Dovzhenko National Film Studio is an enterprise with a full complex technological cycle. Along with the shooting of its own films, the film studio provides services to other film and television companies in the production of their products, belongs to the producers of national films in Ukraine, approved by the Cabinet of Ministers of Ukraine from 26 January 2011 No. 48.

== Selected films ==
=== Soviet Union ===
- 1929 Человек с киноаппаратом / Man with a Movie Camera, directed by Dziga Vertov (documentary film)
- 1930 Земля / Earth, directed by Alexander Dovzhenko (silent film)
- 1932 Иван / Ivan, directed by Alexander Dovzhenko (silent film)
- 1935 Аэроград / Aerograd, directed by Alexander Dovzhenko (science fiction)
- 1939 Щорс / Shchors, directed by Alexander Dovzhenko (documentary film)
- 1941 Богдан Хмельницкий / Bohdan Khmelnytsky, directed by Ihor Savchenko (historical)
- 1951 Тарас Шевченко / Taras Shevchenko, directed by Ihor Savchenko (biographical)
- 1960 Вдали от Родины / Far from the Motherland, directed by Aleksei Shvachko (espionage)
- 1961 За двумя зайцами / Chasing Two Hares, directed by Viktor Ivanov (comedy)
- 1963 Королева бензоколонки / Queen of the Gas Station, directed by Mykola Litus and Oleksiy Mishurin (comedy)
- 1964 Тіні забутих предків / Shadows of Forgotten Ancestors, directed by Sergei Parajanov (historical)
- 1964 Туманность Андромеды / The Andromeda Nebula, directed by Yevheniy Sherstobitov (science fiction)
- 1965 Криниця для спраглих / A Spring for the Thirsty, directed by Yuri Ilyenko (surrealist)
- 1968 Анничка / Annychka, directed by Borys Ivchenko
- 1970 Білий птах з чорною ознакою / White Bird with Black Mark, directed by Yuriy Illienko
- 1972 Пропала грамота / The Lost Letter, directed by Borys Ivchenko (comedy)
- 1973 В бой идут одни «старики» / Only Old Men are Going to Battle, directed by Leonid Bykov (historical)
- 1976 Аты-баты, шли солдаты... / Aty-baty, Soldiers were Going..., directed by Leonid Bykov (historical)
- 1976 Тревожный месяц вересень / The Troubled Month of Veresen, directed by Leonid Osyka (historical)
- 1978 Дознание пилота Пиркса / Test pilota Pirxa, directed by Marek Piestrak
- 1980 Ярослав Мудрый / Yaroslav the Wise, directed by Hryhoriy Kokhan (historical)
- 1981 Така пізня, така тепла осінь / Such Late, Such Warm Autumn, directed by Ivan Mykolaichuk
- 1988 Новые приключения Янки при дворе короля Артура / New Adventures of a Yankee in King Arthur's Court, directed by Viktor Hres

=== Ukraine ===
- 1991 Голод-33 / Famine-33, directed by Oles Yanchuk
- 1991 Чудо в краю забуття / Miracle in the Land of Oblivion, directed by Natalia Motuzko
- 1995 Атентат - осіннє вбивство в Мюнхені / Assassination. An Autumn Murder in Munich, directed by Oles Yanchuk
- 1995 Москаль-чарівник / Moskal-Charivnyk, directed by Mykola Zasieyev-Rudenko
- 1997 Приятель небіжчика / A Friend of the Deceased, directed by Viacheslav Kryshtofovych
- 2000 Нескорений / The Undefeated (2000 film), directed by Oles Yanchuk
- 2001 Молитва за гетьмана Мазепу / Prayer for Hetman Mazepa, directed by Yuriy Illienko
- 2002 Чорна Рада / Chorna Rada (Black Council), directed by Mykola Zasieiev-Rudenko
- 2004 Залізна Сотня / The Company Of Heroes, directed by Oles Yanchuk
- 2008 Владика Андрей / Metropolitan Andrey, directed by Oles Yanchuk
- 2008 Закон / The Law, directed by Vitaliy Potrukh (short film)
- 2009 Хай Бог розсудить їх ... / Let God Judge Them, directed by Yevhen Khvorostianko (short film)
- 2012 Гайдамака / Haidamaka, directed by Roman Synchuk (short film)
- 2012 Метелик / The Butterfly, directed by Maxim Neafit Bujnicki
- 2012 Мамо, я льотчика люблю! / Mom, I Love a Pilot!, directed by Oleksandr Ihnatusha
- 2013 Красна Маланка / Krasna Malanka, directed by Dmytro Sukholytkyy-Sobchuk
- 2015 Загублене місто / Lost City, directed by Vitaliy Potrukh

== See also ==
- Kyivnaukfilm
- List of Ukrainian films
- National Cinematheque of Ukraine
- Odessa Film Studio
- History of Ukrainian animation
