= Visti =

Visti of 16 November 1939, publishing the Law "On the Admission of Western Ukraine to the Ukrainian SSR", meaning the Soviet annexation of Eastern Galicia and Volhynia after the Soviet invasion of Poland.

The Visti ("News") was the government gazette of the Ukrainian Soviet Socialist Republic from 1919 to 1941. Originally founded in Kharkiv in December 1918, it was known under various names, but most commonly Вісті Всеукраїнського Центрального Виконавчого Комітету ("News from the All-Ukrainian Central Executive Committee"), abbreviated Вісті ВУЦВК or Вісти ВУЦВК. From July 1938 onwards, it was named Вісті Рад депутатів трудящих УРСР ("News from the Councils of Workers' Deputies of the Ukrainian SSR").

== Names ==
=== Ukrainian names (1920–1940) ===
- Вісті Центрального виконкому Рад робітничих, селянських і червоноармійських депутатів УРСР (from 15 March 1935 — 29 June 1938) ["News from the Central Executive Committee of the Radas of Workers’, Peasants’ and Red Army Deputies of the Ukrainian SSR"]
- Вісті Всеукраїнського Центрального винавчого комітету Рад робітничих, селянських і червоноармійських депутатів (from 15 November 1924) ["News from the All-Ukrainian Central Executive Committee of the Radas of Workers’, Peasants’ and Red Army Deputies"]
- Вісті Всеукраїнського виконкому Рад робітничих, селянських і червоноармійських депутатів та губвиконкому Харківщини (from 30 November 1923)
- Вісті ВУЦВК (No. 1, 1922)
- Вісті Всеукраїнського Центрального винавчого комітету Рад робітничих, селянських та червоноармійських депутатів (from 1 October 1920)
- Вісті Всеукраїнського Центрального виконавчого комітету Ради робітничих, селянских та червоноармійських депутатів і Харківського губвиконкому (from 28 April 1920) ["News from the All-Ukrainian Central Executive Committee of the Radas of Workers’, Peasants’ and Red Army Deputies and the Kharkiv Provincial Executive Committee"]

=== Russian names (1918–1920) ===
- Известия Всеукраинского Центрального исполнительного комитета Совета рабочих, крестьянских и красноармейских депутатов и Харьковского губревкома (from No. 55, 1920)
- Известия Всеукраинского революционного комитета и Харьковского губернского революционного комитета (from 10 January 1920)
- Известия Харьковского военного революционного комитета (from 16 December 1919)
- Известия Всеукраинского Центрального исполнительного комитета Советов рабочих, крестьянских и красноармейских депутатов и исполнительного комитета Киевского Совета рабочих депутатов (from 1 April 1919)
- Известия Харьковского Совета и губернского исполнительного комитета рабоче-крестьянских и красноармейских депутатов (from 22 March 1919)
- Известия Всеукраинского Центрального исполкома Советов рабочих, крестьянских и красноармейских депутатов и Харьковского Совета рабочих, крестьянских и красноармейских депутатов (from 10 March 1919)
- Известия рабоче-крестьянского правительства Украины и Харьковского Совета депутатов (from 8 March 1919)
- Известия Временного рабоче-крестьянского правительства Украины и Харьковского Совета рабочих депутатов (from 14 January 1918) ["News from the Provisional Workers’ and Peasants’ Government of Ukraine and the Kharkiv Soviet of Workers’ Deputies"]

== History ==
The newspaper was founded in December 1918 in Kharkiv as the official organ of the Kharkiv Council of Workers’ Deputies. The publishing language was in Russian, under the title of Izvestiya. From January 1919, the newspaper was published as the official gazette of the Provisional Workers’ and Peasants’ Government of Ukraine and the Kharkiv Council of Workers’ Deputies. From March to August 1919, it was published daily in Kyiv as the organ of the All-Ukrainian Central Executive Committee of the Councils of Workers’, Peasants’ and Red Army Deputies and the Executive Committee of the Kyiv Council of Workers’ Deputies. It was printed in Ukrainian and Russian, and later in Ukrainian only. From 1920, it was published in Kharkiv as the organ of the All-Ukrainian Central Executive Committee of the Kharkiv Provincial Executive Committee, and from 1921 as the organ of the All-Ukrainian Central Executive Committee. From June 1934, following the relocation of the republic’s capital, it was once again printed in Kyiv.

In July 1938, it changed its name to Visti Rad Deputiv Trudovykh URSR ("News of the Councils of Workers’ Deputies of the Ukrainian SSR"). The gazette published decrees, orders and resolutions of the Government of the Ukrainian SSR, as well as reports on council congresses containing analyses of the decisions adopted.

Regular sections include ‘International News’, ‘Capital City Life’ and the classifieds section. As the newspaper grew, a weekly supplement entitled ‘Literature. Science. Art’ was launched, followed later by Culture and Life, which published works on economics, history and technology. At various times, it has published the supplements ‘Ukrainian Spelling: A Discussion Bulletin’ and ‘Medicine and Hygiene’. The newspaper published detailed reports on the Union for the Freedom of Ukraine trial. The main contributors were Ostap Vyshnya, Mykola Chechel, Petro Lisovyi (Svashenko), Mykola Shrah and others. From 1923 to 1926, Oleksandr Dovzhenko worked as an illustrator for Visti.

The newspaper was published under the editorship of Vasyl Ellan-Blakytny (from 28 May 1920 to 4 December 1925), then Yevhen Kasianenko.

On 14 May 1941, Visti was merged with the party’s central organ, the newspaper Комуніст (Communist), later renamed Радянська Україна (Soviet Ukraine).

== Literature ==
- «Вісти» // Літературознавча енциклопедія ["Literary Encyclopaedia"] : in 2 vols. / ed. by Yu. I. Kovaliv. — Kyiv: Publishing house ‘Akademia’, 2007. Vol. 1: A–L, pp. 194–195.
- Вісти ВУЦВК // Юридична енциклопедія ["Legal Encyclopaedia"].
- Yurkova, Oksana Vitaliivna (2003). "Вісті ВУЦВК" [Visti VUCVK]. Encyclopedia of History of Ukraine (in Ukrainian). Vol. 1. Kyiv: Institute of History of Ukraine. p. 577. Archived from the original on 2 June 2016.
- M. H. Labinsky, Вісті // Encyclopedia of Modern Ukraine / Edited by I. M. Dzyuba [et al.]; National Academy of Sciences of Ukraine, Shevchenko Scientific Society. Kyiv: Institute of Encyclopaedic Research of the National Academy of Sciences of Ukraine, 2005. Vol. 4: V — Vog. 700 pp. ISBN 966-02-3354-X.

== Sources ==
- Електронний архів газети «Вісті ВУЦВК» 1921–1923, 1929–1934 рр. // Kharkiv Korolenko State Scientific Library.
- Електронний архів газети «Вісті ВУЦВК» 1921–1923, 1929–1940 року // Kharkiv Korolenko State Scientific Library. (also in фонді електронних документів)
- https://gpa.eastview.com/crl/seun/newspapers/uvvtv (1922-1934, 1936-1939)
- Вибрані номери газети «Вісті ВУЦВК» за 1922—1940 роки // The ‘Old Newspaper Archive’ website.
- газета (1921-1922) in the archive Libraria
- газета (1922-1925) in the archive Libraria
- газета (1929-1930) at DASO
- Вісті Рад депутатів — газетний фонд НБУВ: 1919–1920, 1920–1929, 1930–1938, 1939–1941
