= Earth (1930 film) =

1930 Soviet film

- Theatrical release poster
- Ukrainian: Земля
- Directed by: Alexander Dovzhenko
- Written by: Alexander Dovzhenko
- Starring: Stepan Shkurat; Semen Svashenko; Yuliya Solntseva; Yelena Maksimova; Mykola Nademsky
- Cinematography: Danylo Demutsky
- Edited by: Alexander Dovzhenko
- Music by: Levko Revutsky (original release); Vyacheslav Ovchinnikov (1971 restoration); DakhaBrakha (2012 remaster)
- Release date: 8 April 1930
- Running time: 76 minutes
- Country: Soviet Union
- Languages: Silent film Russian intertitles

Earth (Russian: «Земля», Ukrainian: «Земля», romanized: Zemlya) is a 1930 Soviet Ukrainian silent film by Alexander Dovzhenko. The film concerns the process of collectivization and the hostility of kulak landowners under the First Five-Year Plan. It is the third film, with Zvenigora and Arsenal, of Dovzhenko's "Ukraine Trilogy".

The script was inspired by Dovzhenko's life and experience of the process of collectivization in his native Ukraine. That process, which was the backdrop of the film and its production, informed its reception in the Soviet Union, which was largely negative.

Earth is commonly regarded as Dovzhenko's masterpiece and as one of the greatest films ever made. The film was voted number 10 on the Brussels 12 list at the 1958 World Expo.

== Plot ==
The film begins with a montage of wind blowing through a field of wheat and sunflowers. Next, the film transitions to show an old peasant named Semyon who dies beneath an apple tree, attended by his son Opanas and grandson Vasyl. Elsewhere, local kulaks, including Arkhyp Bilokin, denounce collectivization and declare their resistance to it. Later, at Opanas's home, Vasyl and his friends meet to discuss collectivization and argue with Opanas, who is skeptical about collectivization.

Later, Vasyl arrives with the community's first tractor to much excitement. After the men urinate in the overheated radiator, the peasants plow the land with the tractor and harvest the grain, destroying the kulaks' fences in the process. A montage sequence presents the production of bread from beginning to end. That night, Vasyl walks along a path on his way home while dancing a hopak, and he is killed by a dark figure. Upon discovery of Vasyl's death, Opanas looks for his son's killer and confronts Khoma, Bilokin's son. Khoma does not confess to the murder.

Vasyl's father turns away the Russian Orthodox priest who expects to lead the funeral, declaring his atheism. He asks Vasyl's friends to give his son a secular funeral and "sing new songs for a new life." The villagers do so, while Vasyl's fiancée, Natalya, mourns him and the priest curses them. At the cemetery, Khoma arrives in a frenzy to declare that he will resist collectivization and that he was the one who killed Vasyl. The villagers ignore Khoma while one of Vasyl's friends eulogizes him. The film ends with a montage showing a downpour of rain over fruit and vegetables, after which Natalya finds herself embraced in the arms of a new lover.

== Cast ==
- Stepan Shkurat as Opanas
- Semen Svashenko as Vasyl. He is nineteen years old, strong and quick, a young man of boundless potential.
- Yuliya Solntseva as Vasyl's sister – an accomplished actress, this was Solntseva's final acting role. She was also an assistant director on the film, which launched her career as a director. She married Dovzhenko in 1929.
- Yelena Maksimova as Natalya
- Mykola Nademsky as Semen
- Petro Masokha as Khoma Bilokin
- Ivan Franko as Arkhyp Bilokin
- Volodymyr Mikhajlov as priest
- Pavlo Petrik as Young Communist League cell leader – He is described as a young, talented orator who is constantly lecturing with "irrepressible optimism which excludes all possibility of doubt".
- O. Umanets as peasant
- Ye. Bondina as peasant girl
- Luka Lyashenko as young kulak

== Production ==
Dovzhenko wrote, produced, and filmed Earth in 1929, during the process of collectivization in the Ukrainian Soviet Socialist Republic, which he described as "a period ... of economic [and] mental transformation of the whole people." Collectivization began in 1929 under the first five-year plan as Soviet General Secretary Joseph Stalin sought to control industrialized agriculture in the Soviet Union. This meant the collectivization of privately owned farms, which peasants resisted by killing their draft animals, sabotaging agricultural machinery, and assassinating Soviet agents. Much of Earth's script was inspired by Dovzhenko's experience of this process; Vasyl's death was based on the assassination of a Soviet agent in his home district. Dovzhenko also drew inspiration from his childhood memories, for instance basing the character of Semyon on his own grandfather.

Production of Earth began on 24 May 1929 and was finished on 25 February 1930. The original soundtrack was composed by Levko Revutsky.

=== Cinematography ===
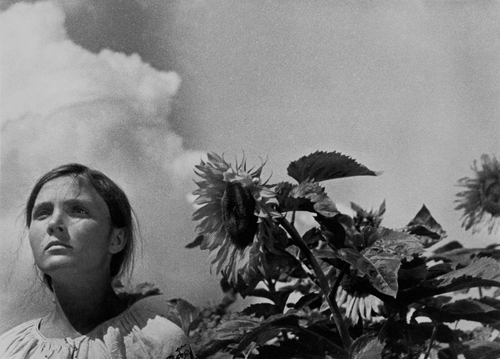
A shot from the first montage, showing a woman standing next to a sunflower against the sky

Filming mostly took place in the Poltava Oblast of Ukraine. To shoot the film, Dovzhenko partnered with the Ukrainian cinematographer Danylo Demutsky, who also shot two of Dovzhenko's previous films, Zvenigora and Arsenal. Close-ups are used extensively to highlight one or several characters, usually unnamed peasants, frequently motionless. Film scholar Gilberto Perez likened Earth's cinematography to Homer's Odyssey, as "all that counts, in a given moment, is what is ... clearly displayed on the screen".

Vasyl's dance celebrating the success of the harvest was originally scripted as a Cossack-style hopak but Svashenko altered it after consulting local Ukrainian farmers. The scene was filmed using soft focus in the early morning, so that the golden hour light illuminated clouds of dust from the dancer's feet stamping on the dirt road. Soft focus was utilized in other important scenes, including the prelude shots in the apple orchard, the moonlit couples, Natalya's grieving, and the closing sequence of fruit in the rain and Natalya with her new lover.

The film is 89 minutes long.

== Release ==
Earth was released on 8 April 1930 and banned by Soviet authorities nine days later. Before Earth was approved for general distribution, certain scenes that were criticized as giving the film a "biological" focus, such as the peasants urinating into the tractor's radiator, were removed. The original negative for the film was destroyed in 1941 by a German air raid during the First Battle of Kiev.

In 1952, Dovzhenko wrote and published his reflections on Earth in a combination of novelization and creator's commentary on the film. An English translation of this Ukrainian-language work was published in the collection Two Russian Film Classics in 1973.

In 2012, the National Oleksandr Dovzhenko Film Center, the Ukrainian state film archive, restored Earth and gave it a new score by the Ukrainian folk quartet DakhaBrakha. This version of the film premiered at the 2012 Odesa International Film Festival.

== Reception and legacy ==
=== Critical response ===
Earth was released at a time when the independence of the film industry in the Soviet Union from the Communist Party was being eroded and its most prominent directors—like Dovzhenko—and critics were being criticized and purged. Soviet authorities and journalists simultaneously lauded the film for its "formal mastery" and derided it for perceived ideological shortcomings. Pravda, the official newspaper of the Communist Party, praised the film's visual style but called its political content "false". The Soviet poet Demyan Bedny attacked Earth, calling it "counterrevolutionary" and "defeatist" in the newspaper Izvestia. Ippolit Sokolov, a Soviet film critic, described Dovzhenko as a "great director" but also "a petty-bourgeois artist" in his review of Earth. Dovzhenko was so upset by the negative reaction to the film that, on the verge of a nervous breakdown, he left Ukraine and traveled abroad to screen his films and experiment with newly developed sound equipment available in western Europe.

Film critic C. A. Lejeune praised the film's main section, saying that it "contains perhaps more understanding of pure beauty in cinema, more validity of relation in moving image, than any ten minutes of production yet known to the screen." Lewis Jacobs compared Dovzhenko's work to that of Sergei Eisenstein and Vsevolod Pudovkin, stating that Dovzhenko "had added a deep personal and poetic insight ... [his films] are laconic in style, with a strange, wonderfully imaginative quality difficult to describe." Film director Grigori Roshal praised the film, writing, "Neither Eisenstein nor Pudovkin have achieved the tenderness and warmth in speaking about men and the world that Alexander Dovzhenko has revealed. Dovzhenko is always experimental. He is always an innovator and always a poet."

Dovzhenko's biographer Marco Carynnyk lauded the film's "passionate simplicity … which has made it a masterpiece of world cinema" and praised its "powerful lyric affirmation of life." It was ranked No. 88 in the 1995 Centenary Poll of the 100 Best Films of the Century in Time Out magazine.

=== Legacy ===
Earth is widely considered to be Dovzhenko's magnum opus, and among the greatest films ever made. The National Oleksandr Dovzhenko Film Center considers Earth to be the most famous Ukrainian film made and placed it at #2 in its 2021 list of the 100 best films in the history of Ukrainian cinema, behind only Shadows of Forgotten Ancestors. Earth was voted one of the twelve greatest films of all time by a group of 117 film historians at the 1958 Brussels World's Fair and was selected as one of five films to be screened at a festival to celebrate the 70th anniversary of UNESCO in 2015.

The work received 10 critics' votes in the 2012 Sight & Sound critics' poll of the world's greatest films. The British Film Institute said of Earth that its plot "is secondary to the extraordinarily potent images of wheatfields, ripe fruit and weatherbeaten faces". In 2022, the film was ranked joint 243rd in the critics' poll, tied with 21 other films.

== See also ==
- Bread
- Dovzhenko Film Studios
- Holodomor – 1932–1933 man-made famine in Soviet Ukraine
- List of Soviet films of 1930
- Soviet propaganda
