= Alexander Dovzhenko =

Soviet filmmaker (1894–1956)

- Александр Довженко (Russian); Олександр Довженко (Ukrainian)
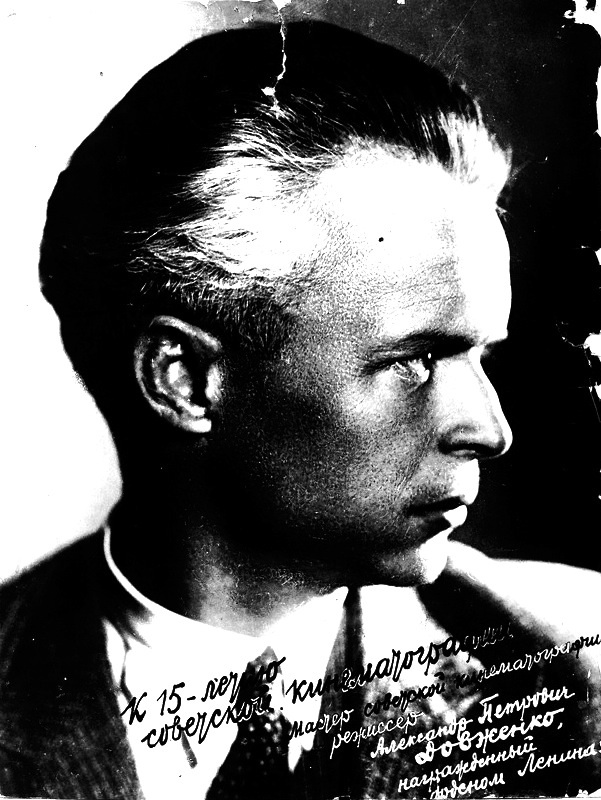
- Dovzhenko in the 1930s
- Born: September 10, 1894; Sosnytsia, Russian Empire (now in Ukraine)
- Died: November 25, 1956 (aged 62); Peredelkino, Russian SFSR, Soviet Union
- Resting place: Novodevichy Cemetery, Moscow
- Occupations: Film director; screenwriter; producer; editor
- Years active: 1926–1956
- Spouse: Yuliya Solntseva

Alexander or Aleksandr Petrovich Dovzhenko, (Note: Russian: Александр Петрович Довженко.) also known as Oleksandr Petrovych Dovzhenko (Note: Ukrainian: Олександр Петрович Довженко.) (September 10 [O.S. August 29] 1894 – November 25, 1956), was a Soviet film director and screenwriter of Ukrainian origin. He is often cited as one of the most important early Soviet filmmakers, alongside Sergei Eisenstein, Dziga Vertov, and Vsevolod Pudovkin, as well as being a pioneer of Soviet montage theory.

== Biography ==
=== Early life ===
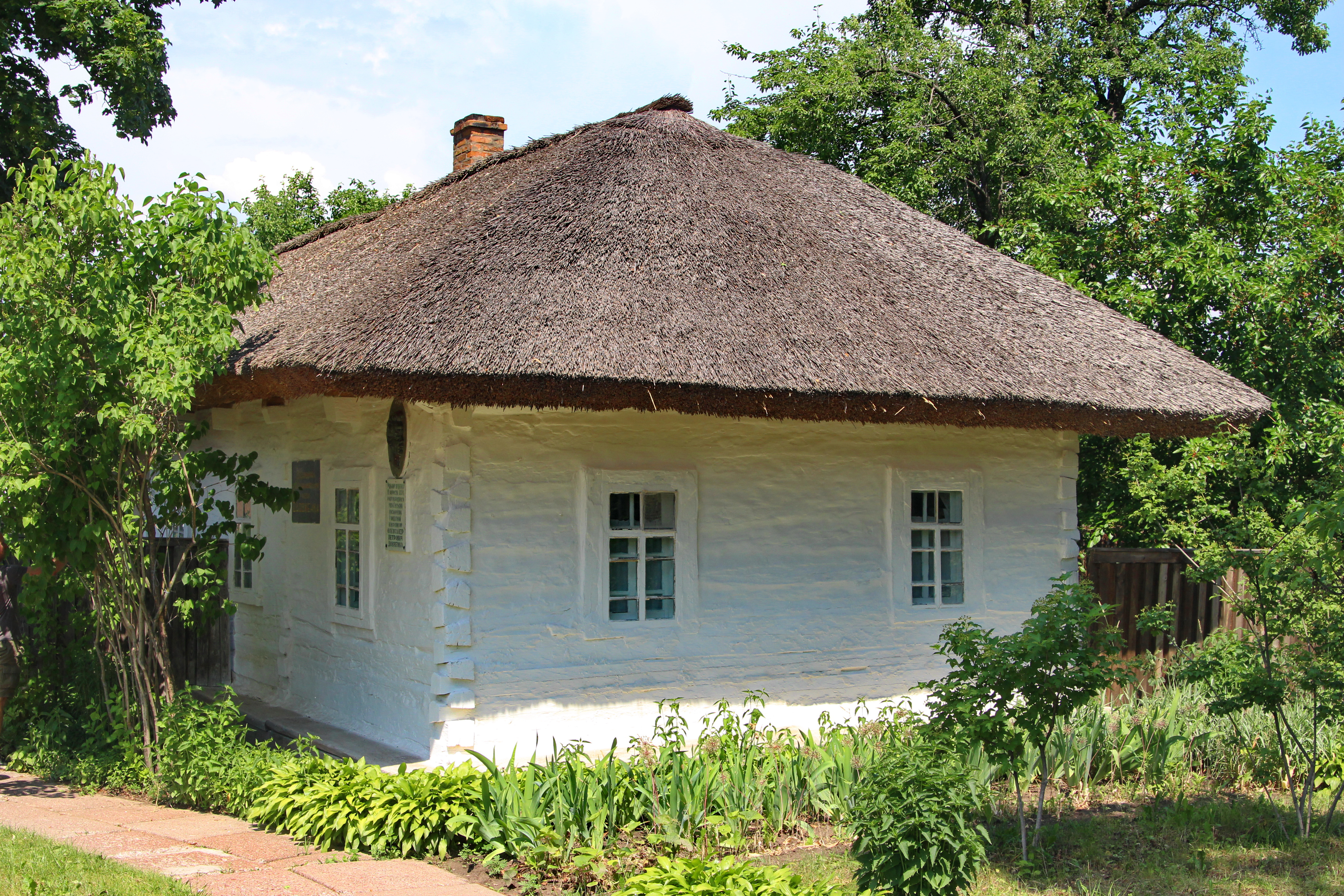
Dovzhenko's birth house in Sosnytsia, now a memorial museum

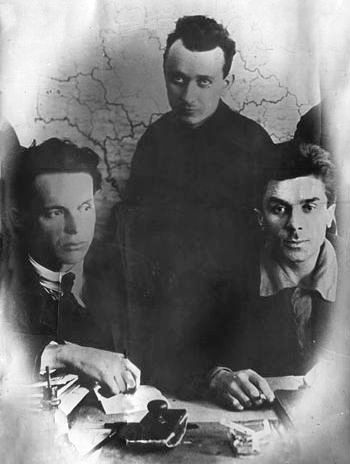
Dovzhenko (left) with Kost Hordiyenko and Mykola Khvylyovy in the editor's office of Vsesvit magazine, 1925

Alexander Dovzhenko was born on September 10 [O.S. August 29] 1894 in the hamlet (khutor) of Viunyshche located in the Sosnitsky Uyezd of the Chernigov Governorate of the Russian Empire (present-day Sosnytsia, Ukraine), to Petro Semenovych Dovzhenko and Odarka Yermolayivna Dovzhenko. Due to policies of the Russian Orthodox Church, he was named in honor of the 13th-century Russian prince Alexander Nevsky, whose translation of relics is commemorated on 30 August. Like most residents of Sosnytsia, the family spoke Ukrainian at home, although Alexander likely learned to read Russian and Church Slavonic before learning to read Ukrainian due to the mandatory use of Russian in schools.

His family was peasants, descendants of Cossacks who had migrated to Sosnytsia in the 18th century, coming from the neighbouring province of Poltava. Alexander was the seventh of fourteen children born to the couple, but due to the deaths of his siblings, he was the oldest child by the time he turned eleven. In 1895, four of his elder brothers had died during a scarlet fever epidemic, while his eldest brother died after contracting typhus in 1905. Ultimately, only Alexander and his sister Polina, who later became a doctor, survived to adulthood.

Although his parents were uneducated, Dovzhenko's semi-literate grandfather encouraged him to study. In 1911, he enrolled in the Hlukhiv Teacher's Institute (today Hlukhiv National Pedagogical University of Oleksandr Dovzhenko), from which Dovzhenko graduated in 1914. Dovzhenko was dispatched to Khoroshiv, where, due to a lack of teachers, he taught a wide variety of subjects, including natural science, gymnastics, geography, physics, history, and drawing. He may have volunteered to serve in the army when World War I broke out, but was granted an exemption due to his teaching responsibilities. On 16 June 1917, he was classified as "unfit for military service" by the regional bureau. He then underwent heart surgery.

=== Political activism and revolution ===
Following the Russian Revolution in 1917, there are gaps in Dovzhenko's biographical records. He may have been aligned with the Bolsheviks' policies, but Dovzhenko identified himself with Ukrainian interests, interpreting the world through national, rather than class divisions. Although other teachers had introduced him to the works of Nikolay Chernyshevsky and Alexander Herzen, Dovzhenko portrayed himself as politically naïve after this period. In 1917 he returned to Kyiv, where he studied at Kyiv Commercial Institute (today Kyiv National Economic University) and later Kyiv Academy of Arts (today National Academy of Fine Arts and Architecture), but he did not finish any of them.

Dovzhenko was a member of the Ukrainian Socialist-Revolutionary Party and a supporter of the Ukrainian Central Council. At the beginning of 1918, he returned to Sosnytsia, and according to his sister's account, large numbers of peasants visited Dovzhenko. Despite being a teacher in Kiev, Dovzhenko remained tied to his peasant past and supported the most pro-peasant party within the Central Council. Following the collapse of the Russian Provisional Government, the Central Council failed to take control of the situation in the Ukrainian countryside due to the Russian Bolsheviks invasion, and soon after Ukraine's independence was declared by the Central Council, the Germans intervened and supported Pavlo Skoropadsky's coup. Following the German withdrawal, various factions sought control of the region. In December of 1918, during the official entrance of the Ukrainian government to Kyiv, the Kyiv newspaper "Vidrodzhenia" published an official greeting of gentleman [dobrodiy] Dovzhenko as representative of the All-Ukrainian Trade Union to the Ukrainina Directorate. Dovzhenko remained in Kiev after the Bolsheviks first took control of the city in January 1918, but he did not remain there after they took control for the second time, from February to August 1919, and this period is the most undocumented part of his life.

=== Arrest, and diplomatic mission ===
Dovzhenko stated that he had served in the Ukrainian People's Army in 1919 following the uprising against Skoropadsky, although this admission does not appear in his autobiographical statement. At the same time, Dovzhenko stated he had never taken part in battles against the Red Army. According to art historian Roman Rosliak, Dovzhenko's autobiographical statements were written in 1939 during a time of mass repressions, and some of his statements contradict information that was preserved in archives. On 19 September 1919, after the Red Army took control of Zhytomyr, Dovzhenko was captured by the Cheka with "arms in his hands". According to his 1939 application to the Communist Party of the Soviet Union, he was released after an investigation. According to other documents that were later published, on 27 December 1919, a revolutionary court determined that he had voluntarily joined the army of Symon Petliura and returned to Bolshevik-controlled territory. He was sentenced to prison until the end of the war, but after the Borotbists intervened, he was released by the Cheka. Dovzhenko then rewrote parts of his life, telling some of his friends that he had voluntarily left the nationalist movement and joined the Bolsheviks. In later accounts, he expressed his disillusionment with Ukrainian nationalism.

Dovzhenko said he had joined the Borotbists, which had broken away from the Ukrainian Socialist Revolutionary Party in 1918 and united with the left wing of the Ukrainian Social Democratic Labour Party in the following year. In 1920, the party merged with the Communist Party, leading Dovzhenko to join the Communists. From December 1919 to April 1920, according to official accounts, Dovzhenko served in the War Commissariat of the Zhytmomyr region before working as a literacy instructor on the staff of the 44th Rifle Division. In April, he was the head of the Zhytmomyr Party School, but that same month, he left for Kiev following the Polish invasion, remaining there until the city was recaptured in June. However, there is no archival evidence to support these accounts. In June, he worked as a secretary within the education department of the Kiev region, and in July, he became secretary for the entire social education administration within the department.

In July 1921, he was appointed head of the general department of the Soviet Ukrainian embassy in Warsaw. He worked in Poland from September 1921 to February 1922, when he was transferred to Berlin. Although he was recalled in July, he was given permission to stay in Germany in order to study art. Upon his return to the Soviet Union in July 1923, he was expelled from the Communist Party. In August, he began working as an illustrator for Visti. At that time, Dovzhenko was also a member of VAPLITE.

Dovzhenko turned to film in 1926 when he landed in Odessa. His ambitious drive led to the production of his second-ever screenplay, Vasya the Reformer (which he also co-directed). He gained greater success with Zvenigora in 1928, the story of a young adventurer who becomes a bandit and counter-revolutionary and comes to a bad end, while his virtuous brother spends the film fighting for the revolution, which established him as a major filmmaker of his era.

=== Ukraine Trilogy ===
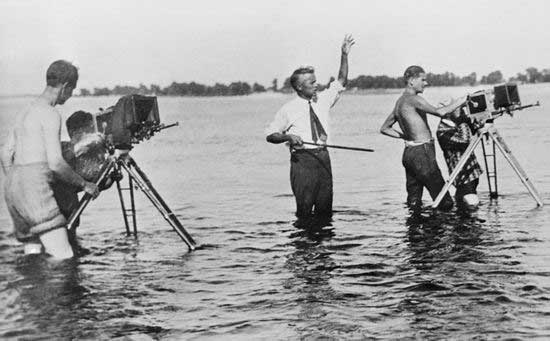
Dovzhenko filming in 1932

Dovzhenko's following "Ukraine Trilogy" (Zvenigora, Arsenal, and Earth), are his most well-known works in the West. The trilogy was produced by the All-Ukrainian Photo-Cinema Administration during the New Economic Policy (NEP) and the korenizatsiya. These provided an interesting environment for the revival of Ukrainian culture in the Soviet Union.

==== Zvenigora (Zvenyhora) ====
The first film of the trilogy presents a historical panorama of Ukrainian history, showing a carnival-like sequence of various peoples and cultures inhabiting the country, from Scythian tribes to opryshky and the author's contemporaries, and putting in question the very concepts of time and space. At the same time, the film promotes typical Socialist realist topics of victory over the nature and defeat of the individuality by collectivism.

==== Arsenal ====
Dovzhenko was said to have taken part in the suppression of the Kiev Arsenal Uprising in 1918 as a supporter of the Ukrainian People's Republic. Ten years later, in 1928, his eponymous movie showed a perspective on the event from the opposite side of the barricades, creating what is widely seen as a propaganda film. Arsenal was poorly received by the communist authorities in Ukraine, who began harassing Dovzhenko - but, fortunately for him, Stalin watched the film and liked it.

==== Earth ====
Dovzhenko's Earth has been praised as one of the greatest silent movies ever made. The British film director Karel Reisz was asked in 2002 by the British Film Institute to rank the greatest films ever made, and he put Earth second. The film portrayed collectivization in a positive light. Its plot revolved around a landowner's attempt to ruin a successful collective farm as it took delivery of its first tractor, though it opened with a long close-up of an elderly, dying man taking intense pleasure in the taste of an apple - a scene with no obvious political message, but with some aspect of autobiography. The film was panned by the Soviet authorities. The poet, Demyan Bedny, attacked the film's "defeatism" over three columns of the newspaper Izvestia, and Dovzhenko was forced to re-edit it.

The filming of the movie took only 9 months, with its premiere taking place on 8 April 1930, soon after Stalin's "Dizzy with Success" speech. However, only nine days later Soviet authorities ordered Earth to be removed from cinema schedules. Nevertheless, during the summer of the same year Dovzhenko embarked on a tour around Europe, demonstrating the film as part of a campaign advertising Soviet achievements abroad. Inside of the Soviet Union critics panned Earth for allegedly taking a pro-kulak position and lacking ideological clarity, and condemned its "biologism". One of the few positive evaluations of Dovzhenko's film was presented by Ukrainian author Mykola Bazhan.

=== Appeal to Stalin ===
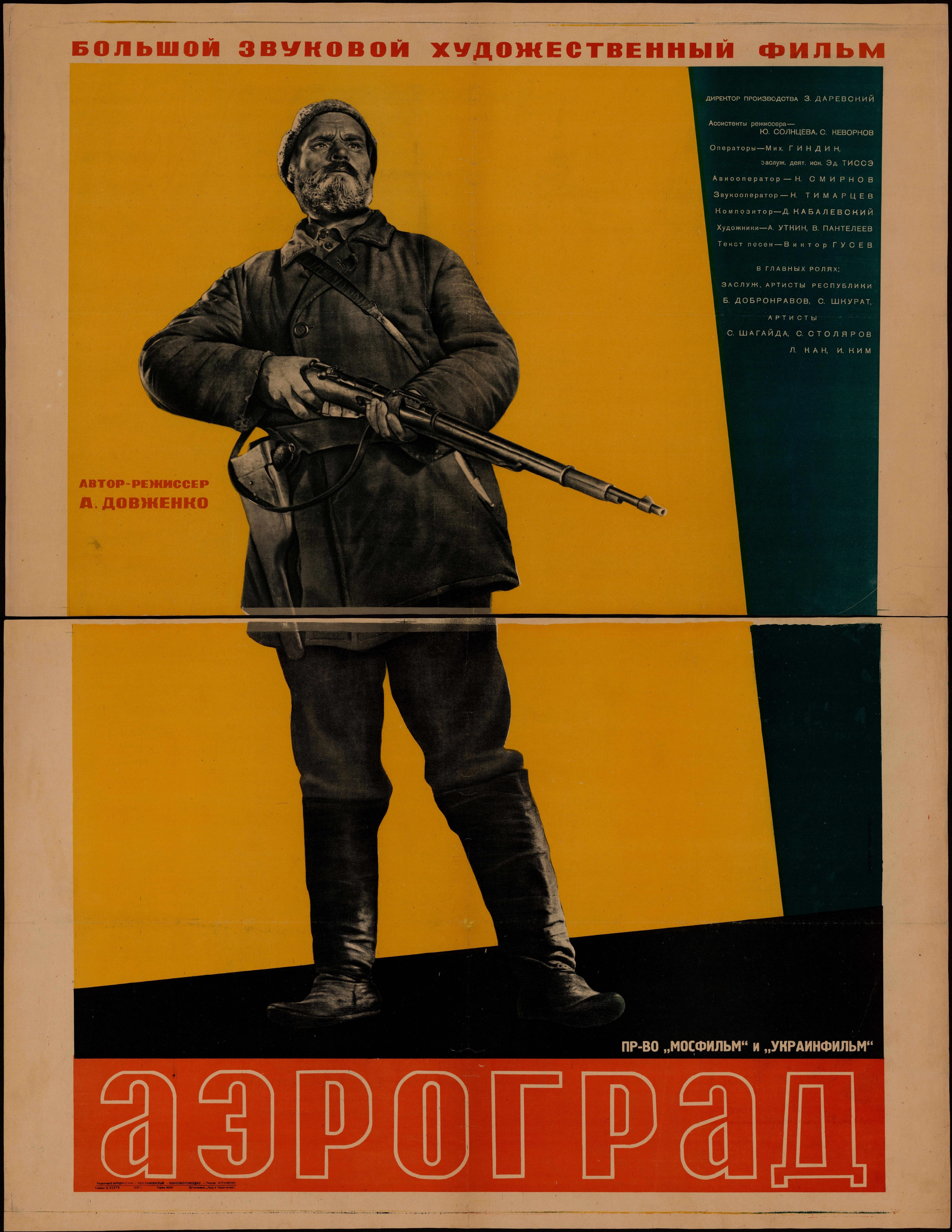
Poster for Aerograd (1935)

Dovzhenko's next film, Ivan, portrayed a Dneprostroi construction worker and his reactions to industrialization, and was summarily denounced for promoting fascism and pantheism. Fearing arrest, Dovzhenko personally appealed to Stalin. One day later, he was invited to the Kremlin, where he read the script of his next project, Aerograd, about the defence of a newly constructed city from Japanese infiltrators, to an audience of four of the most powerful men in the country - Stalin, Molotov, Kirov and Voroshilov. Stalin approved the project but 'suggested' that Dovzhenko's next project, after Aerograd, should be dramatized biography of the Ukrainian-born communist guerrilla fighter, Mykola Shchors.

In January 1935, the Soviet film industry celebrated its fifteenth anniversary with a major festival, during which the country's most renowned director Sergei Mikhailovich Eisenstein, who was in trouble with the authorities, and had not been allowed to complete a film for several years, gave a rambling speech that jumped from one esoteric topic to another. Dovzhenko joined in the criticism, raising a laugh pleading: "Sergei Mikhailovich, if you do not produce a film at least within a year, then please do not produce one at all... All this talk about Polynesian females, I will gladly exchange all your unfinished scenarios for one of your films." At the end of the conference, Stalin presented Dovzhenko with the Order of Lenin.

Later, Dovzhenko was summoned to the Kremlin again, and told by Stalin that he was a "free man", who was not under "any obligation" to make the film about Shchors. He took the hint, and paused work on Aerograd to follow Stalin's 'suggestion', and sent the dictator a draft of the screenplay for Schors. He was then summoned in front of the boss of the Soviet film industry Boris Shumyatsky to be told that the script contained serious political errors. His request for another meeting with Stalin was ignored, so he wrote to the dictator on 26 November 1936, pleading: "This is my life, and if I am doing it wrong, then it is due to a shortage of talent or development, not malice. I bear your refusal to see me as a great sorrow." Stalin's response was a brief note to Shumyatsky, in December, listing five things that were wrong with the script, including that "Shchors came out too crude and uncouth."

=== Work for Soviet propaganda: Shchors and Liberation ===
Bukovina: a Ukrainian Land (1939)

Dovzhenko completed Aerograd in 1935. Before its release in November, Dovzhenko had begun work on Shchors. According to Jay Leyda, who was employed in the Soviet cinema industry at the time:

Shchors taught him the new difficulties of executing a suggestion from Stalin. In the three years before its release, Dovchenko had to submit every decision and every episode to a seemingly endless series of people 'who knew what Stalin wanted'. There were nightmare interviews, some bitter, with the Leader himself, who was beginning to show signs of megalomania and infallibility...Dovzhenko later told friends about one frightening arrival in Stalin's office, when he refused to speak to him, and Beria accused him of joining a nationalist conspiracy.

Several of Dovzhenko's colleagues were shot or sent to labour camps during the Great Purge, in 1937–38, including his favourite cameraman, Danylo Demutsky, who worked with him on Earth. But when, at last, he had completed Shchors, which was released in January 1939, he was paid a huge fee - 100,000 rubles - and awarded the Stalin Prize (1941).

In late October 1939, soon after the Soviet occupation of Western Ukraine, Dovzhenko arrived to Galicia, where he worked as an operator and "political worker", creating a documentary on the "liberation" of the region by the Red Army. After filming in Lviv and the Carpathians, Dovzhenko accompanied the First Secretary of the Communist Party of Ukraine Nikita Khrushchev, who had ordered him to create the movie, on a visit to Przemysl together with Semen Timoshenko, commander of the Ukrainian Front. Later Dovzhenko took part in the People's Congress of Western Ukraine, which legitimized the Soviet annexation of the territory, delivering a speech with an appraisal of Stalin. Part of the material filmed at the congress was also included into the documentary film, which premiered in summer 1940 under the title Liberation.

=== World War II ===
When Germany invaded the Soviet Union in June 1941, the Kiev Studio was evacuated to the Urals and then to Ashgabat in Central Asia. Dovzhenko's elderly father was beaten to death during the German occupation. With the Soviet film industry in disarray, Dovzhenko was sent to the front as a war correspondent, writing articles and leaflets to be dropped by planes in the occupied Ukrainian territory. Witnessing the horrors of the Nazi invasion, Dovzhenko resolved himself to pay tribute through art to the suffering and strength of his fellow Ukrainians. He wrote to his wife, Julia:

I have made a firm decision. [...] I will write about the sufferings, heroism, and tragedy of my nation. I have thought and planned much, and I shall undoubtedly be able to accomplish something before I die.

Due to the chaos of the war, Dovzhenko spent more time writing than directing, including penning a few dozen short stories largely about Ukraine's wartime suffering. The writings of the period include a new genre of 'film novels' such as Ukraïna v ohni (Ukraine in Flames, 1943).

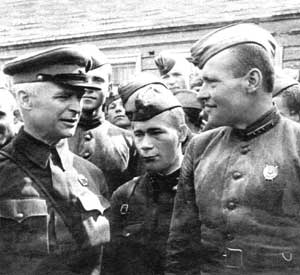
Dovzhenko (left) visiting the front in 1943

Ukraine in Flames was denounced for its alleged 'veiled nationalistic moods'. There are two versions of who was behind the denunciation. Nikita Khrushchev, who was head of the Ukrainian Communist party at the time, paid tribute to Dovzhenko in his memoirs as a "brilliant director", and described the denunciation of Ukraine in Flames as a "disgraceful affair" initiated by the head of the political administration of the Red Army, Aleksandr Shcherbakov, who "was obviously trying hard to fan Stalin's anger by harping on the charge that the film scenario was extremely nationalistic." Dovzhenko had read the scenario aloud to Khrushchev, but he claimed not to have paid much attention to it because he was focused on the war.

But a police report sent at the time by Vsevolod Merkulov, the head of the NKVD, to the party secretary in charge of culture, Andrei Zhdanov, said that Dovzhenko greatly resented the behaviour of Khrushchev, and leaders of the Ukrainian Writers' Union, who had praised the scenario on first reading, but then denounced on orders from above. Dovzhenko was quoted as saying "I don't hold anything against Stalin. I hold something against [...] people who throw malicious slogans at me after all their admiration of the screenplay - these people cannot guide the war and the people. This is trash."

Although most of his time was spent writing, Dovzhenko requested to work as a documentary filmmaker for the Central Newsreel Studio, resulting in two documentary films. During the war, Dovzhenko also wrote Povist’ polum’ianykh lit (Chronicle of Flaming Years, 1945), which was later adapted into an award-winning 1961 film directed by Yuliya Solntseva. Earlier, Solntseva adapted another Dovzhenko work: Poem of the Sea.

=== Later life ===
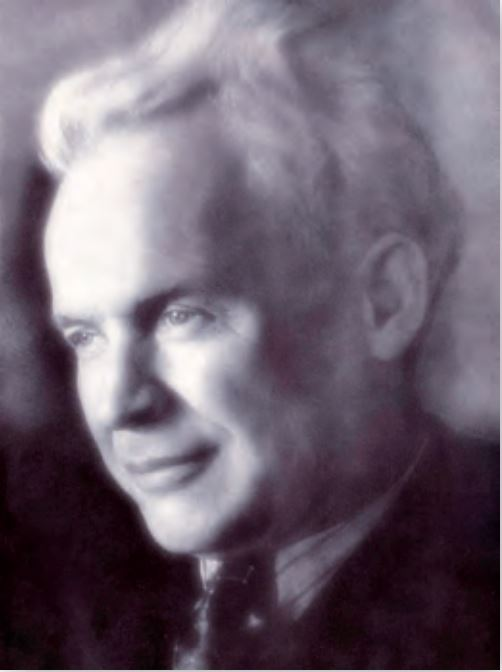
Dovzhenko during his later years

After being hauled in front of the Central Committee, Dovzhenko was excluded from various official organisations, cut himself off from fellow artists, wrote novels, and applied himself to writing a screenplay about the biologist, Michurin. The film Michurin earned him another Stalin prize, in 1949, although it was revised so many times, in order to get political approval, that according to one historian, "a large part of the final version was made without him."

Khrushchev claimed that with his rise to power after the death of Stalin and the execution of the police chief Lavrentiy Beria, the persecution of Dovzhenko ended, and he was able to "live a useful active life" again. He embarked on two projects: a film adaption of the novella Taras Bulba by Gogol; and Poem About a Sea, dedicated to the construction of Kakhovka Reservoir on the Dnieper. Neither of the works had been finished before Dovzhenko died of a heart attack on November 25, 1956, in his dacha in Peredelkino - though the latter was completed by his widow Yulia Solntseva. Over a 20-year career, Dovzhenko personally directed only seven films.

== Legacy ==
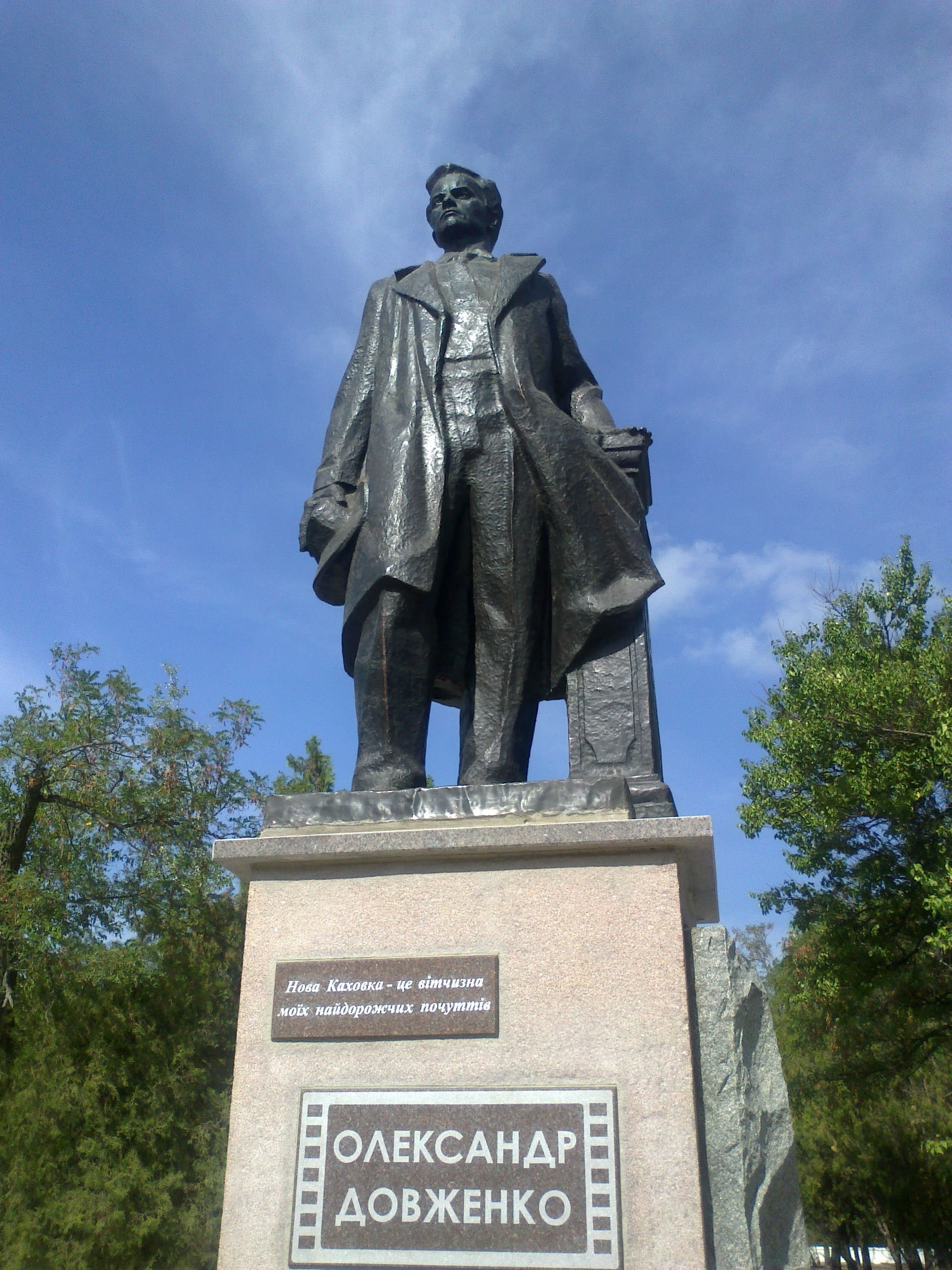
Monument to Alexander Dovzhenko in Nova Kakhovka

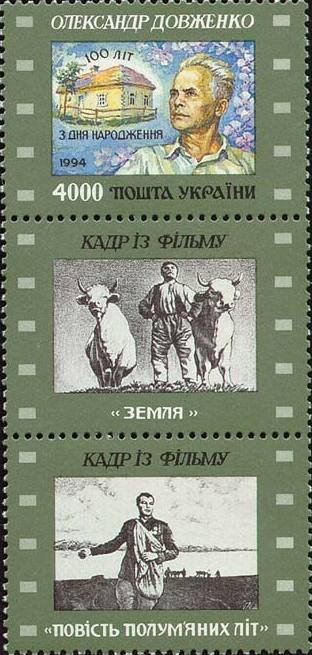
Ukrposhta stamps

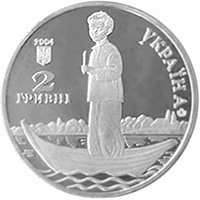
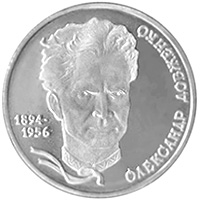
Olexandr Dovzhenko (NBU coin), 2004 issue

Dovzhenko was a mentor to the young Soviet Ukrainian filmmaker Larisa Shepitko and Armenian filmmaker Sergei Parajanov.

The Dovzhenko Film Studios in Kyiv were named in his honour following the director's death.

In 2016, after the Ukrainian government had announced a programme of 'decommunisation' of place names, Karl Liebknecht Street in Melitopol was renamed Oleksandr Dovzhenko Street. On 30 January 2023, after Melitopol had been occupied by the Russian army during the 2022 Russian invasion of Ukraine, Melitopol's Russian-installed Mayor, Galina Danilchenko announced that the street would be given back its previous name.

=== Dovzhenko Centre ===
Oleksandr Dovzhenko National Centre in Kyiv is Ukraine's largest film archive, which was launched in 1994 on the base of a film printing factory. Since 2015 an art cluster has been functioning as part of the centre, making it a popular platform for modern art.

=== Film award ===
A film award called the Oleksandr Dovzhenko State Prize was named after him for his great contributions in the film sphere.

== Filmography ==
- Love's Berries (Russian: Ягoдки Любви, romanized: Yagodki lyubvi, Ukrainian: Ягідки кохання, romanized: Yahidky kokhannya), 1926
- Vasya the Reformer (Russian: Вася – реформатор, romanized: Vasya – reformator, Ukrainian: Вася – реформатор, romanized: Vasya – reformator), 1926
- The Diplomatic Pouch (Russian: Сумка дипкурьера, romanized: Sumka dipkuryera, Ukrainian: Сумка дипкур'єра, romanized: Sumka dypkuryera), 1927
- Zvenigora (Russian: Звенигора, romanized: Zvenigora, Ukrainian: Звенигора, romanized: Zvenyhora), 1928
- Arsenal (Russian: Арсенал, Ukrainian: Арсенал), 1929
- Earth (Russian: Зeмля, romanized: Zemlya, Ukrainian: Зeмля, romanized: Zemlia), 1930
- Ivan (Russian: Иван, Ukrainian: Iвaн), 1932
- Aerograd (Russian: Аэроград, Ukrainian: Аероград, romanized: Aerohrad), 1935
- Bukovina: a Ukrainian Land (Russian: Буковина, земля Украинская, romanized: Bukovina, zemlya Ukrainskaya, Ukrainian: Буковина, зeмля Українськa, romanized: Bukovyna, zemlia Ukrayinska), 1939
- Shchors* (Russian: Щорс, Ukrainian: Щорс), 1939
- Liberation (Russian: Освобождение, Ukrainian: Визволення, 1940
- Battle for Soviet Ukraine* (Russian: Битва за нашу Советскую Украину, romanized: Bitva za nashu Sovetskuyu Ukrainu, Ukrainian: Битва за нашу Радянську Україну, romanized: Bytva za nashu Radiansku Ukrayinu), 1943
- Soviet Earth (Russian: Cтpaнa poднaя, romanized: Strana rodnaya, Ukrainian: Країна pідна, romanized: Krayina ridna), 1945
- Victory in the Ukraine and the Expulsion of the Germans from the Boundaries of the Ukrainian Soviet Earth (Russian: Победа на Правобережной Украине и изгнание немецких захватчиков за пределы украинских советских земель, romanized: Pobeda na Pravoberezhnoi Ukraine i izgnaniye nemetsikh zakhvatchikov za predeli Ukrainskikh sovietskikh zemel, Ukrainian: Перемога на Правобережній Україні, romanized: Peremoha na Pravoberezhniy Ukrayini), 1945
- Michurin (Russian: Мичурин, Ukrainian: Мічурін), 1948
- Farewell, America (Russian: Прощай, Америкa, romanized: Proshchay, Amerika, Ukrainian: Прощавай, Америко, romanized: Proshchavay, Ameryko), 1949
- Poem of the Sea* (Russian: Поэма о море, romanized: Poema o more, Ukrainian: Поема про море, romanized: Poema pro more), 1959

*codirected by Yuliya Solntseva

== Sources ==
- Liber, George O. (2002). Alexander Dovzhenko: A Life in Soviet Film. British Film Institute. ISBN 978-0-85170-927-7.
