= National Oleksandr Dovzhenko Film Centre =

Oleksandr Dovzhenko National Centre
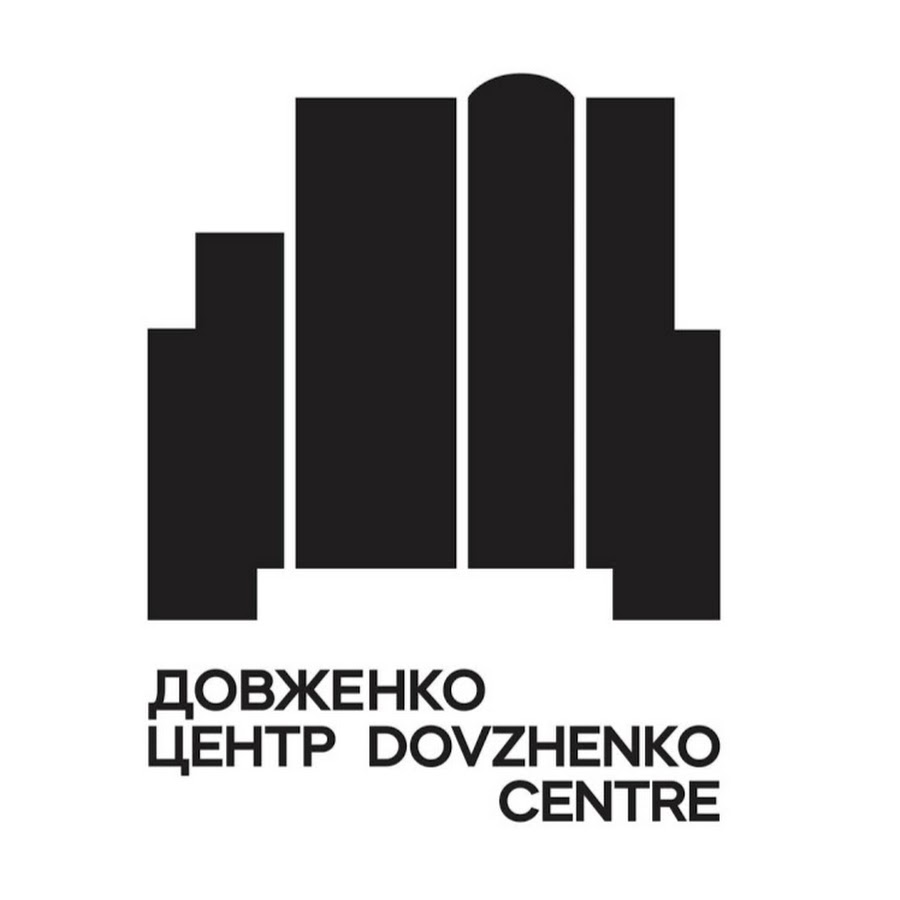

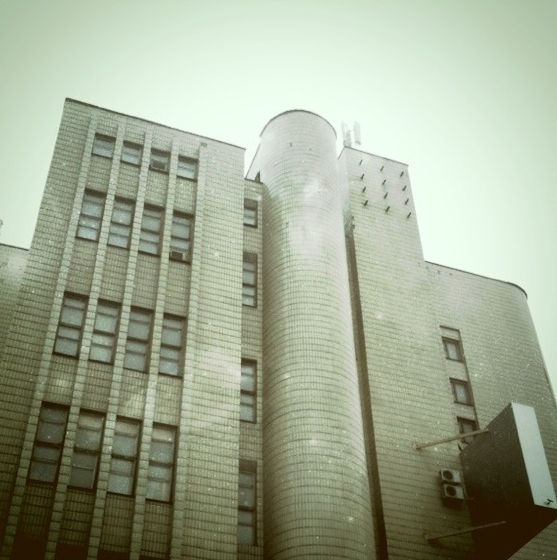
- Oleksandr Dovzhenko National Centre building
- Founded: 1994
- Location: Kyiv, Ukraine
- Website: www.dovzhenkocentre.org

Oleksandr Dovzhenko National Centre (Ukrainian: Національний центр Олександра Довженка, romanized: Natsionalnyy tsentr Oleksandra Dovzhenka; also Dovzhenko Centre, Довженко-Центр, Dovzhenko-Tsentr) is the state film archive of Ukraine and a cultural cluster located in Kyiv.

== History ==
It was founded in 1994 by a decree of the President of Ukraine. In 2000, Dovzhenko Centre was merged with the former Kyiv Film Printing Factory (established in 1948), the only and the biggest of its kind in Ukraine, and took over its property, facilities, and film collection. Since 2006 the Centre has been a member of the International Federation of Film Archives. The Ukrainian Animation Film Studio (aka Ukranimafilm, established in 1990) was attached to the Centre in 2019.

From 2016–2019 the former industrial premises of the Centre underwent a complete renovation and refurbishment, and were converted into a multi-artform cultural cluster. In September 2019 the Centre opened the first Film Museum in Ukraine.

In July 2022, directorship of the Centre was transferred from the Ministry of Culture and Information Policy to the Ukrainian State Film Agency. The Agency subsequently announced plans to split the Centre into three different institutions—a research archive, an animation studio, and a public events centre—saying than an audit had found the Centre's structure unprofitable. The Agency refused to publish the audit publicly, citing the 2022 Russian invasion of Ukraine.

== Structure ==
Dovzhenko Centre's operates a film depository, chemical and digital film laboratories, the Film Museum, a film archive and a mediatheque. The institution is housed in an eight-storey building in Kyiv's Holosiivskyi District. It also operates a 300-seat performing arts venue Scene 6, located on its sixth floor together with several independent theatre music and performing arts companies and collectives.

== Collection ==
Dovzhenko Centre's film collection includes over 7,000 Ukrainian, Russian, American and European feature, documentary and animation films; thousands of archive documents, photos, posters and other artifacts that represent the history of Ukrainian cinema from the beginning of the 20th century until the present day. The oldest film print preserved by the Centre dates back to 1910, and the oldest Ukrainian feature film in the Centre's collection was produced in 1922.

== See also ==
- Cinema of Ukraine
- List of film archives
