= List of Ukrainian films =

This article contains films produced in Ukraine. For more detailed list see the category.

== 1888–1919 ==
- 1910 Ukrainian: Шемелько-денщик, або Хохол наплутав, romanized: Shemelko-denshchyk, abo Khokhol naplutav, directed by Oleksandr Ostroukhov-Arbo (silent film)
- 1912 Ukrainian: Запорізька січ, lit. 'Zaporizhian Sich', directed by Danylo Sakhnenko (silent film)
- 1912 Ukrainian: Любов Андрія, lit. 'Andriy's Love', directed by Danylo Sakhnenko (silent film)
- 1913 Ukrainian: Полтава, lit. 'Poltava', directed by Danylo Sakhnenko (silent film)
- 1913 Жизнь Евреев в Палестине / The Life of the Jews in Palestine / חיי היהודים בארץ ישראל / La vie des Juifs en Palestine, directed by Noah Sokolovsky (silent film)

== 1920s ==
- 1926 Ukrainian: Ягідка кохання, lit. 'Love's Berries', directed by Oleksandr Dovzhenko (silent film)
- 1926 Ukrainian: Вася – реформатор, lit. 'Vasia the Reformer', directed by Oleksandr Dovzhenko (silent film)
- 1926 Ukrainian: Тарас Трясило, romanized: Taras Triasylo, directed by Petro Chardynin (silent film)
- 1926 Ukrainian: Тарас Шевченко, lit. '"Taras Shevchenko"', directed by Petro Chardynin (silent film)
- 1927 Ukrainian: Сумка дипкур'єра, lit. 'The Diplomatic Pouch', directed by Oleksandr Dovzhenko (silent film)
- 1928 Ukrainian: Арсенал, lit. 'Arsenal', directed by Oleksandr Dovzhenko (silent film)
- 1928 Ukrainian: Звенигора, lit. 'Zvenyhora', directed by Oleksandr Dovzhenko (silent film)
- 1928 Ukrainian: Шкурник, lit. 'Leather-man', directed by Mykola Shpykovsky (silent film)
- 1929 Ukrainian: Хліб, lit. 'Bread', directed by Mykola Shpykovsky (silent film)
- 1929 Ukrainian: Людина з кіноапаратом, lit. 'Man with a Movie Camera', directed by Dzyha Vertov (documentary film)

== 1930s ==
- 1930 Ukrainian: Симфонія Донбасу, lit. 'Enthusiasm (Symphony of the Donbas)', directed by Dzyha Vertov
- 1930 Ukrainian: Земля, lit. 'Earth', directed by Oleksandr Dovzhenko (silent film)
- 1931 Ukrainian: Кармелюк, lit. 'Karmeliuk', directed by Favst Lopatynskyi
- 1932 Ukrainian: Іван, lit. 'Ivan', directed by Oleksandr Dovzhenko (silent film)
- 1932 Ukrainian: Коліївщина, lit. ' Koliyivshchyna', directed by Ivan Kavaleridze
- 1934 Ukrainian: Велика гра, lit. 'The Great Game', directed by Heorhiy Tasin
- 1934 Ukrainian: Строгий юнак, lit. 'A Severe Young Man', directed by Abram Room
- 1935 Ukrainian: Аероград, lit. 'Aerograd', directed by Oleksandr Dovzhenko (sci-fi)
- 1936 Ukrainian: Наталка Полтавка, lit. 'Natalka Poltavka', directed by Ivan Kavaleridze
- 1936 Ukrainian: Назар Стодоля, lit. 'Nazar Stodolia', directed by Heorhiy Tasin
- 1937 Ukrainian: Запорожець за Дунаєм, lit. 'A Zaporozhian Cossack beyond the Danube', directed by Ivan Kavaleridze
- 1938 Кармелюк / Karmeliuk, directed by Heorhiy Tasin
- 1939 Ukrainian: Буковина, зeмля Українськa, lit. 'Bukovina: a Ukrainian Land', directed by Oleksandr Dovzhenko
- 1939 Ukrainian: Щорс, lit. 'Shchors', directed by Oleksandr Dovzhenko (documentary film)

== 1940s ==
- 1940 Ukrainian: Визволення, lit. 'Liberation', directed by Oleksandr Dovzhenko
- 1941 Ukrainian: Богдан Хмельницький, lit. '"Bohdan Khmelnytsky"', directed by Ihor Savchenko
- 1941 Ukrainian: Таємничий острів, lit. 'Mysterious Island', directed by Eduard Pentslin
- 1942 Ukrainian: Як гартувалась сталь, lit. 'How the Steel Was Tempered', directed by Mark Donskoy
- 1943 Ukrainian: Битва за нашу Радянську Україну, lit. 'Battle for Soviet Ukraine', directed by Oleksandr Dovzhenko
- 1944 Ukrainian: Веселка, lit. 'The Rainbow', directed by Mark Donskoy
- 1945 Ukrainian: Країна pідна, romanized: Karina ridna, lit. 'Soviet Earth', directed by Oleksandr Dovzhenko
- 1945 Ukrainian: Перемога на Правобережній Україні та вигнання німецьких загарбників за межі українських радянських земель, lit. 'Victory in Ukraine and the Expulsion of the Germans from the Boundaries of the Ukrainian Soviet Lands', directed by Oleksandr Dovzhenko
- 1947 Ukrainian: Подвиг розвідника, lit. 'Secret Agent', directed by Borys Barnet
- 1948 Ukrainian: Мічурін, lit. 'Michurin', directed by Oleksandr Dovzhenko
- 1949 Ukrainian: Прощай, Америко, lit. 'Farewell, America', directed by Oleksandr Dovzhenko

== 1950s ==
- 1951 Ukrainian: Тарас Шевченко, lit. 'Taras Shevchenko', directed by Ihor Savchenko
- 1952 Ukrainian: В степах України, lit. 'In the Steppes of Ukraine', directed by Tymofiy Levchuk
- 1952 Ukrainian: Украдене щастя, lit. 'Stolen Happiness', directed by Hnat Yura (by the drama of Ivan Franko)
- 1953 Ukrainian: Запорожець за Дунаєм, lit. 'A Zaporozhian Cossack beyond the Danube', directed by Vasyl Lapoknysh
- 1953 Ukrainian: Мартин Боруля, lit. 'Martyn Borulia', directed by Oleksiy Shvachko
- 1953 Ukrainian: Доля Марини, lit. 'Maryna's Destiny', directed by Viktor Ivchenko
- 1954 Ukrainian: Назар Стодоля, lit. 'Nazar Stodolia', directed by Viktor Ivchenko
- 1955 Ukrainian: Іван Франко, lit. 'Ivan Franko', directed by Tymofiy Levchuk
- 1955 Ukrainian: Сватання на Гончарівці, lit. 'Matchmaking at Honcharivka', directed by Ihor Zamhano
- 1956 Ukrainian: Є такий хлопець, lit. 'There is such a Fellow', directed by Viktor Ivchenko
- 1957 Ukrainian: Правда, lit. 'The Truth', directed by Viktor Dobrovolskyi and Isaac Shmaruk
- 1958 Ukrainian: Надзвичайна подія, lit. 'Extraordinary Event', directed by Viktor Ivchenko
- 1959 Ukrainian: Іванна, lit. 'Ivanna', directed by Viktor Ivchenko
- 1959 Ukrainian: Григорій Сковорода, lit. '"Hryhorii Skovoroda"', directed by Ivan Kavaleridze
- 1959 Ukrainian: Поема про море, lit. 'Poem of the Sea', directed by Yuliya Solntseva and Oleksandr Dovzhenko
- 1959 Ukrainian: Небо кличе, lit. 'Sky is Calling', directed by Mikhail Karyukov and Aleksandr Kozyr

== 1960s ==
- 1960 Наталія Ужвій / Nataliya Uzhviy, directed by Serhiy Paradzhanov
- 1961 Біля крутого Яру / By the Step Ravine, directed by Kira Muratova and Oleksandr Muratov
- 1961 Лісова пісня / Forest Song, directed by Viktor Ivchenko
- 1961 За двома зайцями / Chasing Two Hares, directed by Viktor Ivanov (by the play of Mykhailo Starytsky)
- 1962 Квітка на камені (Ніхто так не кохав) / Flower on the Stone, directed by Serhiy Paradzhanov
- 1962 Небо кличе / Battle Beyond the Sun, directed by Mykhailo Kariukov, Oleksandr Kozyr and Francis Ford Coppola (additional sequences US version)
- 1963 Королева бензоколонки / Queen of the Gas Station, directed by Mykola Litus and Oleksiy Mishurin
- 1963 Наймичка / Naimychka (The Servant Woman), directed by Ivan Levchenko (musical)
- 1964 Наш чесний хліб / Our Honest Bread, directed by Kira Muratova and Oleksandr Muratov
- 1964 Тіні забутих предків / Shadows of Forgotten Ancestors, directed by Sergei Parajanov
- 1964 Сон / The Dream, directed by Volodymyr Denysenko
- 1964 Туманність Андромеди / The Andromeda Nebula, directed by Yevheniy Sherstobitov
- 1965 Гадюка / The Viper, directed by Viktor Ivchenko
- 1965 Вірність / Fidelity, directed by Petro Todorovskyi
- 1965 Криниця для спраглих / Well for Thirsty, directed by Yuriy Illienko
- 1966 Бур'ян / Wild Grass, directed by Anatoliy Bukovskyi
- 1966 Соловей із села Маршинці / Nightingale from the Village of Marshyntsi, directed by Rostyslav Synko (musical clip featuring Sofia Rotaru)
- 1967 Нудьги заради / Out of Boredom, directed by Artur Voitetskyi
- 1967 Короткі зустрічі / Brief Encounters, directed by Kira Muratova
- 1967 Київські мелодії / Kyiv Melodies, directed by Ihor Samborskyi
- 1968 Анничка / Annychka, directed by Borys Ivchenko
- 1968 Камінний хрест / Stone Cross, directed by Leonid Osyka (by the novels of Vasyl Stefanyk)
- 1969 Ми з України / We are from Ukraine, directed by Vasyl Illiashenko

== 1970s ==
- 1970 Білий птах з чорною ознакою / White Bird with Black Mark, directed by Yuriy Illienko
- 1970 Комісари / Commisars, directed by Mykola Mashchenko
- 1970 Довгі проводи / Long Farewells, directed by Kira Muratova
- 1971 Захар Беркут / Zakhar Berkut, directed by Leonid Osyka (by the story of Ivan Franko)
- 1971 Червона рута / Chervona Ruta, directed by Roman Oleksiv (musical featuring Sofia Rotaru and Vasyl Zinkevych)
- 1972 Наперекір усьому / Contrary to Everything, directed by Yuriy Illienko
- 1972 Пропала Грамота / The Lost Letter, directed by Borys Ivchenko
- 1973 Як гартувалась сталь / How the Steel Was Tempered, directed by Mykola Mashchenko
- 1973 Повість про жінку / Novella About a Woman, directed by Volodymyr Denysenko
- 1973 Коли людина посміхнулась / When Person Smiled, directed by Borys Ivchenko
- 1973 У бій ідуть лише «старі» / Only Old Men are Going to Battle, directed by Leonid Bykov
- 1974 Марина / Maryna, directed by Borys Ivchenko
- 1975 Канал / The Channel, directed by Volodymyr Bortko
- 1975 Пісня завжди з нами / Song is Always with Us, directed by Viktor Storozhenko (musical featuring Sofia Rotaru)
- 1975 Я більше не буду / I'm Done, directed by Yevgeni Sherstobitov
- 1976 Ати-бати, йшли солдати... / Aty-baty, Soldiers were Going..., directed by Leonid Bykov
- 1976 Тривожний місяць вересень / The Troubled Month of Veresen, directed by Leonid Osyka
- 1977 Весь світ в очах твоїх... / All the World is in Your Eyes, directed by Stanislav Klymenko
- 1978 Пізнаючи білий світ / Getting to Know the Big, Wide World, directed by Kira Muratova
- 1978 Д'Артаньян та три мушкетери / D'Artagnan and Three Musketeers, directed by Heorhiy Yungvald-Khilkevych
- 1978 Море / The Sea, directed by Leonid Osyka
- 1978 Дізнання пілота Піркса / Inquest of Pilot Pirx, directed by Marek Piestrak
- 1979 Пригоди Електроніка / The Adventures of the Elektronic, directed by Kostiantyn Bromberg
- 1979 Місце зустрічі змінити не можна / The Meeting Place Cannot Be Changed, directed by Stanislav Hovorukhin
- 1979 Дударики / Dudaryky, directed by Stanislav Klymenko
- 1979 Вавілон XX / Babylon XX, directed by Ivan Mykolaichuk

== 1980s ==
- 1980 «Мерседес» втікає від погоні / Mercedes-Benz Escapes the Chase, directed by Yuriy Liashenko
- 1980 Лісова пісня. Мавка / The Forest Song. Nymph, directed by Yuriy Illienko
- 1980 Чорна курка, або Підземні жителі / Black Chicken or the Underground Inhabitants, directed by Viktor Hres
- 1980 Ярослав Мудрий / Yaroslav the Wise, directed by Hryhoriy Kokhan
- 1981 Високий перевал / High Pass, directed by Volodymyr Denysenko
- 1981 Така пізня, така тепла осінь / Such Late, Such Warm Autumn, directed by Ivan Mykolaichuk
- 1982 Трест, що луснув / The Trust That Has Burst, directed by Oleksandr Pavlovskyi
- 1982 Чарівники / Wizards, directed by Kostiantyn Bromberg
- 1982 Повернення Баттерфляй / The Return of Batterfly, directed by Oleh Fialko
- 1983 Серед сірих каменів / Among Grey Stones, directed by Kira Muratova
- 1983 Легенда про княгиню Ольгу / The Legend of Princess Olha, directed by Yuriy Illienko
- 1983 Миргород та його мешканці / Myrhorod and its Inhabitants, directed by Mykhailo Illienko
- 1983 Військово-польовий роман / Wartime Romance, directed by Petro Todorovskyi
- 1983 Колесо історії / Wheel of History, directed by Stanislav Klymenko
- 1983 Вир / Whirlpool, directed by Stanislav Klymenko
- 1984 Украдене щастя / Stolen Happiness, directed by Yuriy Tkachenko (by the drama of Ivan Franko)
- 1985 Вклонись до землі / Earth-reaching Bowing, directed by Leonid Osyka
- 1986 У пошуках капітана Гранта / In Search of Captain Grant, directed by Stanislav Hovorukhin
- 1986 І в звуках пам'ять відгукнеться... / And Memory Will Recall in the Sounds..., directed by Tymofiy Levchuk
- 1986 Запорожець за Дунаєм / A Zaporozhian Cossack beyond the Danube, directed by Yuriy Suiarko
- 1987 Все перемагає любов / Love Conquers All, directed by Mykola Mashchenko
- 1987 Данило — князь Галицький / Danylo — Kniaz of Halychyna, directed by Yaroslav Lupiy
- 1988 Нові пригоди Янкі при дворі короля Артура / New Adventures of a Yankee in King Arthur's Court, directed by Viktor Hres
- 1988 Чорна Долина / Black Valley, directed by Halyna Horpynchenko
- 1989 Астенічний синдром / The Asthenic Syndrome, directed by Kira Muratova
- 1989 Небилиці про Івана / Fables about Ivan, directed by Borys Ivchenko
- 1989 Камінна душа / Stone Soul, directed by Stanislav Klymenko
- 1989 В Далеку Путь / Taking Off, directed by Oles Yanchuk (short film)

== 1990s ==
- 1990 Посилка для Маргарет Тетчер / Package for Margaret Thatcher, directed by Vadym Kastelli
- 1990 Лебедине озеро. Зона / Swan Lake: The Zone, directed by Yuriy Illienko
- 1991 Голод-33 / Famine-33, directed by Oles Yanchuk
- 1991 Козаки йдуть / Cossacks Go, directed by Serhiy Omelchuk
- 1991 Останній бункер / The Last Bunker, directed by Vadym Illienko
- 1991 Карпатське золото / Carpathian Gold, directed by Viktor Zhyvolub
- 1991 Танго смерті / Tango of Death, directed by Oleksandr Muratov
- 1991 Подарунок на іменини / Gift on Birthday, directed by Leonid Osyka
- 1991 Іван та кобила / Ivan and Mare, directed by Volodymyr Fesenko
- 1991 Чудо в краю забуття / Miracle in the Land of Oblivion, directed by Nataliya Motuzko
- 1992 Голос трави / Sound of Grass, directed by Nataliya Motuzko
- 1992 Кому вгору, кому вниз / To Whom is Up, To Whom is Down, directed by Stanislav Klymenko
- 1992 Натурник / Sitter, directed by Viktor Vasylenko
- 1992 Вінчання зі смертю / Wedding With Death, directed by Mykola Mashchenko
- 1992 Кисневий голод / Oxygen Starvation, directed by Andriy Donchyk
- 1992 Чотири листи фанери / Four Sheets of Plywood, directed by Ivan Havryliuk and Saido Kurbanov
- 1992 Тарас Шевченко. Заповіт / Taras Shevchenko. Testament, directed by Stanislav Klymenko
- 1992 Вишневі ночі / Cherry Nights, directed by Arkadiy Mikulskyi
- 1993 Вперед, за скарбами гетьмана! / Hunt for Cossack Gold!, directed by Vadym Kastelli
- 1993 Гетьманські клейноди / Hetman's Regalia, directed by Leonid Osyka
- 1993 Фучжоу / Fuchzhou, directed by Mykhailo Illienko
- 1993 Тіні війни / Shadows of War, directed by Heorhiy Gongadze (documentary film)
- 1993 Сад Гетсиманський / Garden of Gethsemane, directed by Rostyslav Synko (by the novel of Ivan Bahriany)
- 1994 Тигролови / Tiger Catchers, directed by Rostyslav Synko (by the novel of Ivan Bahriany)
- 1994 Дорога на Січ / The Road to Sich, directed by Serhiy Omelchuk
- 1994 Захоплення / Passions, directed by Kira Muratova
- 1994 Співачка Жозефіна, або мишачий народ / Josephine the Singer, or the Mouse Folk, directed by Serhiy Masloboishchykov
- 1995 Атентат - осіннє вбивство в Мюнхені / Assassination. An Autumn Murder in Munich, directed by Oles Yanchuk
- 1995 Москаль-чарівник / Moskal-Charivnyk, directed by Mykola Zasieiev-Rudenko
- 1995 Страчені світанки / Executed Dawns, directed by Hryhoriy Kokhan
- 1995 Партитура на могильному камені / Score on the Gravestone, directed by Yaroslav Lupiy
- 1996 Вальдшнепи / Woodcocks, directed by Oleksandr Muratov
- 1996 Операція "Контракт" / Operation "Contract", directed by Tamara Boiko
- 1997 Приятель небіжчика / A Friend of the Deceased, directed by Viacheslav Kryshtofovych
- 1997 Сьомий маршрут / The Seventh Route, directed by Mykhailo Illienko
- 1997 Три історії / Three Stories, directed by Kira Muratova
- 1998 Тупик / Dead End, directed by Hryhoriy Kokhan
- 1999 Усім привіт / Hello Everyone, directed by Dmytro Tomashpolskyi
- 1999 Аве, Марія / Ave, Maria, directed by Liudmyla Yefymenko
- 1999 Як коваль щастя шукав / How the Blacksmith Looked for Happiness, directed by Radomyr Vasylevsky
- 1999 Прощай, Дніпро! / Farewell, Dnipro!, directed by Oleksandr Muratov (short film)
- 1999 Схід — Захід / East/West, directed by Régis Wargnier

== 2000s ==
- 2000 Нескорений / The Undefeated, directed by Oles Yanchuk
- 2000 Мийники автомобілів / Car Washers, directed by Volodymyr Tykhyi
- 2001 Провінціальний роман / Provincial Romance, directed by Oleksandr Muratov
- 2001 На Полі Крові / Akeldama, directed by Yaroslav Lupiy
- 2001 Молитва за гетьмана Мазепу / Prayer for Hetman Mazepa, directed by Yuriy Illienko
- 2002 Чеховські мотиви / Chekhov's Motifs, directed by Kira Muratova
- 2002 Чорна Рада / Chorna Rada (Black Council), directed by Mykola Zasieiev-Rudenko
- 2002 Таємниця Чингісхана / Secret of Genghis Khan, directed by Volodymyr Seveliev
- 2002 Шум вітру / Wind Noise, directed by Serhiy Masloboishchykov
- 2003 Мамай / Mamay, directed by Oles Sanin
- 2003 Один у полі воїн / One Man Army, directed by Henadiy Virsta and Oleh Mosiychuk
- 2003 Цикута / Cikuta, directed by Oleksandr Shapiro
- 2003 Золота лихоманка / Gold Rush, directed by Mykhailo Bielikov
- 2003 Вишивальниця в сутінках / Embroiderers in the dark, directed by Mykola Sedniev
- 2004 Настроювач / The Tuner, directed by Kira Muratova
- 2004 Трагічне кохання до зрадливої Нуськи / Tragic Love to Flighty Nuska, directed by Taras Tkachenko (short film)
- 2004 Татарський триптих / Tatar Triptych, directed by Oleksandr Muratov
- 2004 Проти Сонця / Against the Sun, directed by Valentyn Vasianovych
- 2004 Михайлюки / Mykhailiuky, directed by Serhiy Krutyn (short film)
- 2004 Водій для Віри / A Driver for Vira, directed by Pavlo Chukhrai
- 2004 Залізна сотня / The Company of Heroes, directed by Oles Yanchuk
- 2004 Украдене щастя / Stolen Happiness, directed by Andriy Donchyk (by the drama of Ivan Franko)
- 2004 Між Гітлером і Сталіном — Україна в II Світовій війні / Between Hitler and Stalin, directed by Sviatoslav Novytsky (documentary film)
- 2004 Червоний ренесанс / Red Renaissance, directed by Viktor Shkurin and Oleksandr Frolov (documentary film)
- 2005 День Сьомий. Півтори Години У Стані Громадянської Війни / Day Seven, directed by Oles Sanin (documentary film)
- 2005 Дрібний Дощ / Drizzle, directed by Heorhiy Deliyev (short film)
- 2005 Далекий постріл / Far Shot, directed by Valeriy Shalyha
- 2005 Братство / Brotherhood, directed by Stanislav Klymenko
- 2005 Помаранчеве небо / The Orange Sky, directed by Oleksandr Kiriyenko
- 2005 У рамках долі — Історія 1-ї української дивізії УНА 1943—1945 / History of the First Ukrainian Division UNA 1943-1945, directed by Taras Khymych (documentary film)
- 2006 Убивство у зимовій Ялті / Murder in Winter Yalta, directed by Oleksandr Muratov
- 2006 Прорвемось! / Stop Revolution!, directed by Ivan Kravchyshyn
- 2006 Собор на крові / Sobor on the Blood, directed by Ihor Kobryn (documentary film)
- 2006 Музей Степана Бандери У Лондоні / Stepan Bandera Museum In London, directed by Oles Yanchuk (documentary film)
- 2006 Аврора / Aurora, directed by Oksana Bairak
- 2006 Штольня / The Pit, directed by Liubomyr Levytskyi (Kobylchuk)
- 2006 Хеппі Піпл / Happy People, directed by Oleksandr Shapiro
- 2007 Два в одному / Two in One, directed by Kira Muratova
- 2007 Біля річки / At the River, directed by Eva Neymann
- 2007 Помаранчева любов / Orange Love, directed by Alan Badoiev
- 2007 НАТО: свій чи чужий? / NATO: Friend or Foe?, directed by Vadym Kastelli (documentary film)
- 2007 Приблуда / The Stray, directed by Valeriy Yamburskyi (short film)
- 2007 Богдан-Зиновій Хмельницький / Bohdan-Zynoviy Khmelnytskyi, directed by Mykola Mashchenko
- 2007 Запорожець за Дунаєм / A Zaporozhian Cossack beyond the Danube, directed by Mykola Zasieiev-Rudenko
- 2008 Дума про Тараса Бульбу / Duma about Taras Bulba, directed by Petro Pinchuk and Yevhen Bereziak
- 2008 Прикольна казка / Funny Tale, directed by Roman Shyrman
- 2008 Сафо. Кохання без меж / Sappho. Love without Limits, directed by Robert Crombie
- 2008 Владика Андрей / Metropolitan Andrey, directed by Oles Yanchuk
- 2008 Ілюзія страху / Illusion of Fear, directed by Oleksandr Kiriyenko
- 2008 Меніни / Las Meninas, directed by Ihor Podolchak
- 2008 Райські птахи / Birds of Paradise, directed by Roman Balayan
- 2008 Тринадцять місяців / Thirteen Months, directed by Illia Noiabrov
- 2008 Обійми Мене / Embrace Me, directed by Liubomyr Levytskyi (Kobylchuk)
- 2008 Закон / The Law, directed by Vitaliy Potrukh (short film)
- 2009 Хай Бог розсудить їх... / Let God Judge Them, directed by Yevhen Khvorostianko (short film)
- 2009 День переможених / Day of the Defeated, directed by Valeriy Yamburskyi
- 2009 Вторнення / Invasion, directed by Artem Khakalo and Oleksandr Khakalo
- 2009 Мелодія для шарманки / Melody for a Street-organ, directed by Kira Muratova

== 2010s ==
- 2010 Щастя моє / My Joy, directed by Serhiy Loznytsia
- 2010 Відторгнення / Rejection, directed by Volodymyr Lert
- 2010 Золотий вересень. Хроніка Галичини 1939-1941 / Golden September. The Halychyna Chronicles 1939-1941, directed by Taras Khymych (documentary film)
- 2010 Глухота / Deafness, directed by Myroslav Slaboshpytskyi (short film)
- 2011 4 дні в травні / 4 Days in May, directed by Achim von Borries
- 2011 Гамер / The Gamer, directed by Oleh Sientsov
- 2011 Вона заплатила життям / She Paid the Ultimate Price, directed by Iryna Korpan (documentary film)
- 2011 Той, хто пройшов крізь вогонь / Firecrosser, directed by Mykhailo Illienko
- 2011 Легка, як пір'їнка / Feathered Dreams, directed by Andriy Rozhen
- 2012 Вічне повернення. Кастинг / Eternal Redemption: The Casting, directed by Kira Muratova
- 2012 Дім з башточкою / House with a Turret, directed by Eva Neymann
- 2012 Ядерні відходи / Nuclear Waste, directed by Myroslav Slaboshpytskyi (short film)
- 2012 Мамо, я льотчика люблю! / Mom, I Love a Pilot!, directed by Oleksandr Ihnatusha
- 2012 Не переймайся / Don't Worry!, directed by Hanka Tretiak
- 2012 Гайдамака / Haidamaka, directed by Roman Synchuk (short film)
- 2012 Срібна Земля. Хроніка Карпатської України 1919-1939 / Silver Land. The Chronicles of Carpatho-Ukraine 1919-1939, directed by Taras Khymych (documentary film)
- 2012 Істальгія / Eastalgia, directed by Dariya Onyshchenko
- 2012 Хайтарма / Haytarma, directed by Akhtem Seitablaiev
- 2012 Звичайна справа / Business as Usual, directed by Valentyn Vasianovych
- 2013 Delirium, directed by Ihor Podolchak
- 2013 Присмерк / Twilight, directed by Valentyn Vasianovych (documentary film)
- 2013 Креденс / Credenza, directed by Valentyn Vasianovych
- 2013 Іван Сила / Strong Ivan, directed by Viktor Andiyenko
- 2013 Параджанов / Paradjanov, directed by Serge Avedikian and Olena Fetisova
- 2013 F 63.9 Хвороба кохання / F 63.9 Love Sickness, directed by Dmytro Tomashpilskyi and Olena Demianenko
- 2013 Ломбард / Pawnshop, directed by Liubomyr Levytskyi (Kobylchuk)
- 2013 Тіні Незабутих Предків / Unforgotten Shadows , directed by Liubomyr Levytskyi (Kobylchuk)
- 2013 Брати. Остання сповідь / Brothers. The final confession, directed by Viktoriya Trofimenko
- 2013 Зелена кофта / The Green Jacket, directed by Volodymyr Tykhyi
- 2013 Такі красиві люди / Such Beautiful People, directed by Dmytro Moiseiev
- 2013 Козацькі байки / Cossack's Fables, directed by Anton Zhadko (short film)
- 2014 Трубач / Trumpeter, directed by Anatoliy Mateshko
- 2014 Київський торт / Kyiv Cake, directed by Oleksiy Shaparev
- 2014 Синевир / Synevyr, directed by Oleksandr Aloshechkin and Viacheslav Aloshechkin
- 2014 Хроніка Української Повстанської Армії 1942-1954 / The Chronicles of Ukrainian Insurgent Army 1942-1954, directed by Taras Khymych (documentary film)
- 2014 Плем'я / The Tribe, directed by Myroslav Slaboshpytskyi
- 2014 Поводир / The Guide, directed by Oles Sanin
- 2014 Майдан / Maidan, directed by Serhiy Loznytsia (documentary film)
- 2014 Пісня пісень / Song of Songs, directed by Eva Neymann
- 2014 Одного разу в Україні / Once Upon a Time in Ukraine, directed by Ihor Parfonov
- 2015 Козак та смерть / Cossack and Death, directed by Anton Zhadko (short film)
- 2015 Легіон. Хроніка Української Галицької Армії 1918—1919 / Legion. The Chronicles of Ukrainian Halychyna Army 1918-1919, directed by Taras Khymych (documentary film)
- 2015 Зима у вогні: Боротьба України за свободу / Winter on Fire: Ukraine's Fight for Freedom, directed by Yevhen Afinieievskyi (documentary film)
- 2015 Незламна / Indestructible, directed by Serhiy Mokrytskyi
- 2015 Загублене місто / Lost City, directed by Vitaliy Potrukh
- 2015 Гетьман / Hetman, directed by Valeriy Yamburskyi
- 2015 Люби мене / Love Me, directed by Maryna Er Horbach and Mehmed Bahadir Er
- 2015 Тепер я буду любити тебе / Now I'm Gonna Love You, directed by Roman Shyrman
- 2015 Українські шерифи / Ukrainian Sheriffs, directed by Roman Bondarchuk (documentary film)
- 2015 Жива Ватра / The Living Fire, directed by Ostap Kostiuk (documentary film)
- 2015 Dixie Land directed by Roman Bondarchuk (documentary film)
- 2016 Селфіпаті / #SelfieParty, directed by Liubomyr Levytskyi (Kobylchuk)
- 2016 Моя бабуся Фані Каплан / My grandmother Fanny Kaplan, directed by Olena Demianenko
- 2016 Гніздо горлиці / The Nest of the Turtledove, directed by Taras Tkachenko
- 2016 Жива / Alive, directed by Taras Khymych
- 2016 Микита Кожум'яка (Драконячі чари) / Niki Tanner (The Dragon Spell), directed by Mamuk Depoian
- 2016 Чунгул / Chunhul, directed by Oleksandr Aloshechkin and Viacheslav Aloshechkin
- 2016 Осінні спогади / Autumn memories, directed by Ali Fakhr Mousavi
- 2016 Слуга народу 2 / Servant of the People 2, directed by Oleksey Kiryushchenko
- 2017 Люксембург / Luxembourg, directed by Myroslav Slaboshpytskyi
- 2017 Інфоголік / Infoholic, directed by Valentyn Shpakov and Vladyslav Klymchuk
- 2017 Сторожова застава / The Stronghold, directed by Yuriy Kovalov
- 2017 Максим Оса / Maksym Osa, directed by Oleksiy Mamedov and Ivan Saitkin
- 2017 Давай, танцюй! / Let's dance!, directed by Oleksand Berezan and Mykyta Bulhakov
- 2017 Dustards / Dustards, directed by Stanislav Gurenko (documentary film)
- 2017 Рівень чорного / Black Level, directed by Valentyn Vasyanovych
- 2017 Межа / The Line, directed by Peter Bebjak
- 2017 Кіборги. Герої не вмирають / Cyborgs: Heroes Never Die, directed by Akhtem Seitablaiev
- 2017 Merry-Go-Round, directed by Ihor Podolchak
- 2017 Червоний / Chervonyy, directed by Zaza Buadze
- 2018 Я. Ти. Він. Вона / Me. You. He. She, directed by Volodymyr Zelenskyi and David Dodson

== 2020s ==
- 2020 Віктор Робот / Victor Robot, directed by Anatoliy Lavrenishyn
- 2020 Мати Апостолів / Mother of Apostles, directed by Zaza Buadze
- 2021 Бог простить / God Will Forgive, directed by Hovhannes Khachatryan (short film)
- 2021 Носоріг / Rhino, directed by Oleh Sentsov
- 2022 Люксембург, Люксембург / Luxembourg, Luxembourg, directed by Antonio Lukich
- 2022 Pamfir, directed by Dmytro Sukholytkyy-Sobchuk
- 2023 20 Days in Mariupol, directed by Mstyslav Chernov
- 2023 Щедрик / Carol of the Bells, directed by Olesia Morhunets-Isaienko
- 2023 Shttl, directed by Ady Walter
- 2024 Dad's Lullaby, directed by Lesia Diak
- 2024 Ти - космос / U Are the Universe, directed by Pavlo Ostrikov
- 2025 2000 метрів до Андріївки / 2000 Meters to Andriivka, directed by Mstyslav Chernov
- 2026 Нy МАМ!, directed by Oleh Borshchevskyi
- 2026 Don't Ask Me If I Killed, directed by Helena Maksyom
- 2026 Корпорат / Corporate, directed by Oleksandr Kirienko

== See also ==
- List of Ukrainian submissions for the Academy Award for Best Foreign Language Film
