= List of Ukrainian films of the 1930s =

- 1930 Земля / Earth, directed by Oleksandr Dovzhenko (silent film)
- 1932 Іван / Ivan, directed by Oleksandr Dovzhenko (silent film)
- 1932 Коліївщина / Koliyivshchyna, directed by Ivan Kavaleridze
- 1935 Аероград / Aerograd, directed by Oleksandr Dovzhenko (sci-fi)
- 1936 Наталка Полтавка / Natalka Poltavka, directed by Ivan Kavaleridze
- 1936 Прометей / Prometheus, directed by Ivan Kavaleridze
- 1939 Щорс / Shchors, directed by Oleksandr Dovzhenko (documentary film)
