= The Caucasus (poem) =

1845 poem by Taras Shevchenko

The Caucasus (Ukrainian: Кавказ) is an 1845 poem by Ukrainian poet Taras Shevchenko. Widely recognized as one of the peaks of the author's creative activity, and a masterpiece of political poetry, the poem praises the national liberation struggle of the peoples of the Caucasus against Russian imperialism during the Caucasus War. The work is dedicated to Shevchenko's close friend Yakiv De Balmen, who was forcibly recruited into the Russian imperial army and died fighting in the Caucasus.

== History ==
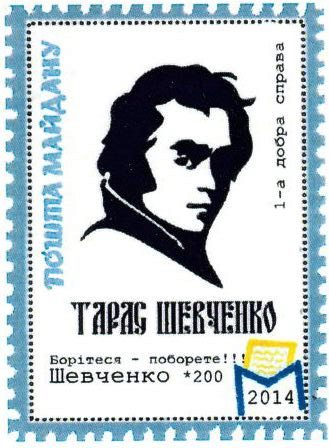
A post stamp issued during the Euromaidan protests with one of the lines from the poem Caucasus

The idea of the poem emerged in August–September 1845, soon after Shevchenko had learnt about the death of his friend De Balmen in a Russian campaign in Dargo. Shevchenko finished the text on 14 December of the same year. In December 1846 the poet secretly sent a handwritten copy of the work to Adam Mickiewicz. Shevchenko also read the poem during meetings of the Brotherhood of Saints Cyril and Methodius. The poem was published in print for the first time in 1859 in Leipzig along with other poems by Shevchenko, as well as works by Pushkin, but not in its entirety. In 1867 Caucasus saw its first publication as part of a collection of Shevchenko's poems in Lviv.

== Content ==
In his poem the author expresses his solidarity with subjugated people of any nation and proclaims the ideals of human freedom and brotherly love. He condemns forced conscription of Ukrainians for the fight against free peoples of the Caucasus, organized in order to bring the latter into captivity, and grieves that his friend had to die in battle not for Ukraine, but for its oppressor. He also presents a broad picture of the subjugation of Ukrainians and other peoples in the Russian Empire.

The central figure of the poem is Prometheus, who, according to a legend, was chained to the Caucasian mountains and had to suffer daily attacks by a predatory eagle (also a symbol of the Russian Empire). In Shevchenko's work the suffering of the legendary hero acquires an optimistic tone, and his refusal to give up symbolizes the invincibility of a people fighting for its freedom. The image of Prometheus in the poem could have been inspired by contemporary texts by George Byron and Percy Bysshe Shelley.

== Legacy ==
Prometheus, a 1936 film by Ivan Kavaleridze, is based on the poem.

Excerpts from the poem calling for the people to fight for their freedom were publicly read by Serhiy Nigoyan, a Ukrainian of Armenian ethnicity, during the Euromaidan protests in Kyiv in 2014.
