= Natalka Poltavka =

1819 Ukrainian play by Ivan Kotliarevsky

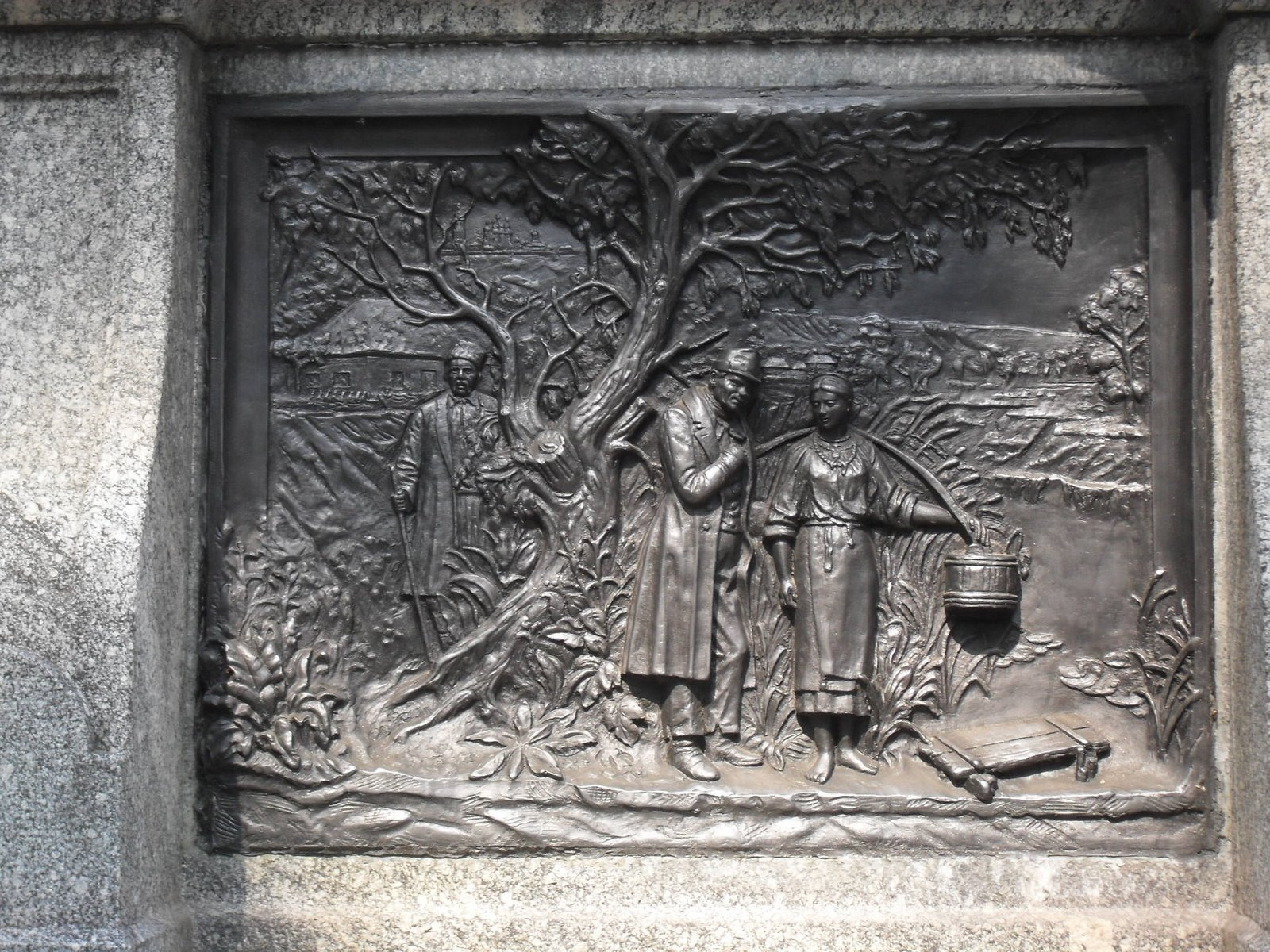
Scene from Natalka Poltavka on the Kotlyarevsky monument in Poltava (sculptor L. Pozen (1903))

Natalka Poltavka (Ukrainian: «Наталка Полтавка», lit. 'Natalka from Poltava') is a Ukrainian play written by Ivan Kotliarevsky.

== History ==
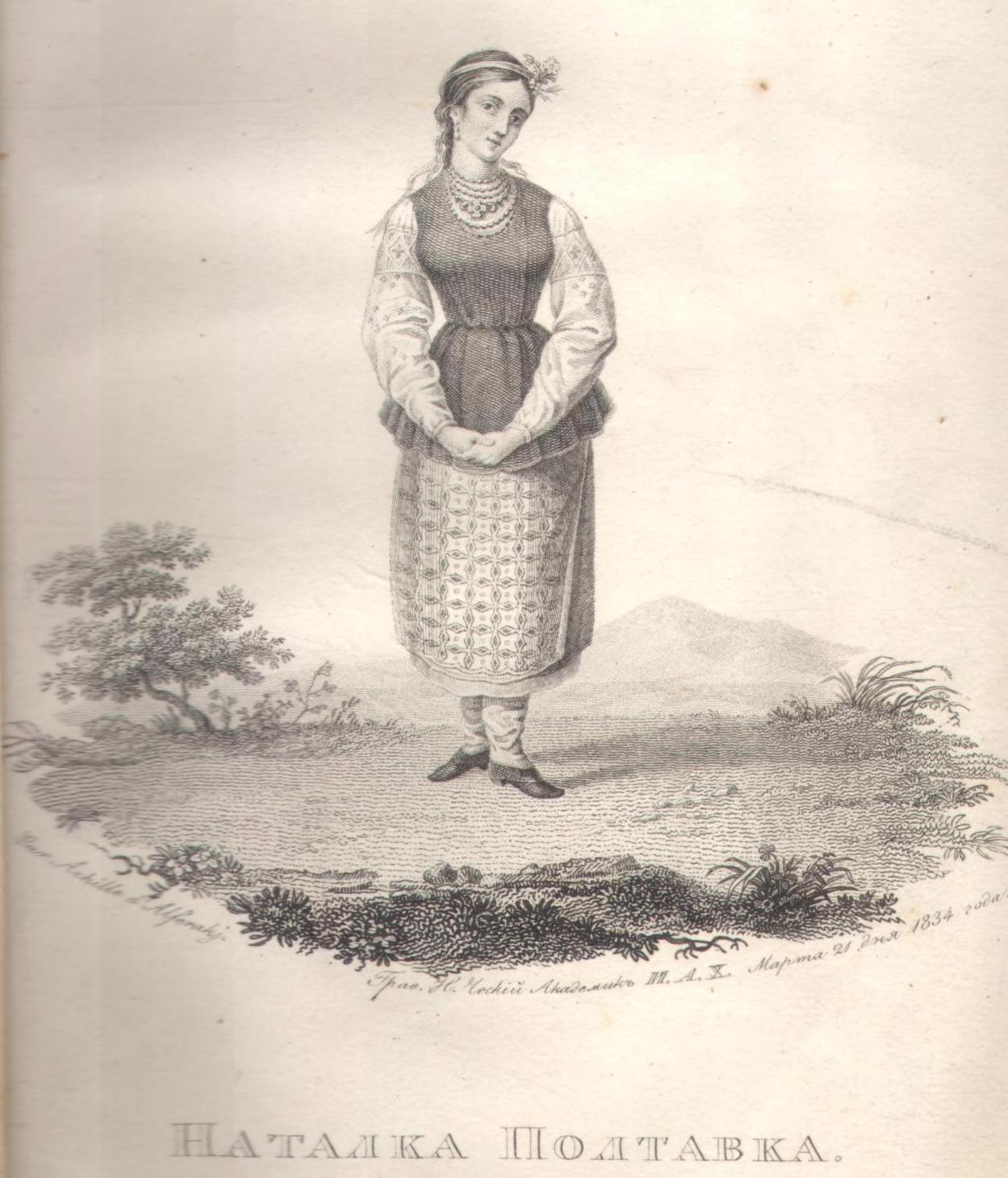
Image of Natalka Poltavka in Kharkov's digest «The Morning Star» (Утренняя звезда). 1834.

The play was written in 1819 in the Ukrainian language, and first performed in 1821 in the city of Kharkiv (then a part of the Russian Empire), though it was not available in print until 1838. The play served as the basis for the operetta Natalka Poltavka by Ukrainian composer Mykola Lysenko, and it has also been made into a number of films in Ukraine and abroad. The play has the features of classicist poetics and also, in keeping with the spirit of Ukrainian national rebirth of the period in which it was written, a distinct interest in the lives of the common Ukrainian people and peasants. This latter element accounts for its great popularity in Ukraine both at the time of its writing and in the present day, and also its influence on the development of Ukrainian dramatic literature in the 19th century.

== Plot ==
The play follows the trials and tribulations of Natalka and Peter (Petro). The sweethearts plan to get married; however, Natalka's father does not approve of the marriage because Petro is not affluent enough to keep Natalka in the manner he thought that she should be kept. Petro goes off to earn the required fortune. In the meantime, Natalka's father passes away, the family is left destitute and they are forced to move into poor peasant accommodations. With no news from Petro for five years, Natalka succumbs to her mother's wishes and finally accepts her next offer of marriage, which happens to come from an old, but relatively wealthy government official. Petro returns with the small fortune he has earned to discover that his beloved has promised herself in marriage to someone else. Tension increases until the lovers are once again united. Amongst the apparent tragic circumstance of the lover's plight is the village comedy relief of the Russified Ukrainian government official who speaks in a broken language trying to unsuccessfully emulate the language of the Russian officials of the day. Ultimately, true love triumphs over all.

== Film adaptations ==
The play was made into a film that was released on December 24, 1936 in Ukraine. The film was directed by Ivan Kavaleridze. This film was the first adaptation of an operetta produced in the former Soviet Union. Another film, directed by Ukrainian American Vasyl Avramenko, was released a year later on February 14, 1937 in the United States. This was the first Ukrainian language film produced in the U.S.

== Opera adaptation ==
Although the first version of the play in 1819 contained a number of Ukrainian folk songs which were sung at different points throughout the work, the first known musical adaptation of the play was made by Kharkiv musician A. Barsytsky and was partly published in 1833. Simultaneously the play starring M. Shchepkin as Vyborny was premiered in Moscow in the 1830s with music arranged by the head violinist and later conductor A. Gurianov. Later arrangements were made by A. Yedlichka, M. Vasyliev and others.

In 1889, a version by the Ukrainian composer Mykola Lysenko premiered. This version upstaged all the previous versions of the work. Lysenko took the original songs from the play, which were lengthened and wrote orchestral accompaniments to these folk songs and dances in the play. He enlarged the musical tapestry producing background music to some parts. The songs were transformed into arias, an overture and musical entracts were added which stayed true to the spirit of Kotliarevsky's play. Although Lysenko's version is usually categorised as an operetta, it is more close to an opera-comique, containing long stretches of spoken dialogue.

in 2019 in Kharkiv the new opera Natalka Poltavka by Oleksandr Shchetynsky was performed at the festival Kharkiv Assemblies.
