= Politseymako =

Politseymako (Russian: Полицейма́ко) is a Russian surname with Greek origin. Notable people with the surname include:

- Maria Politseymako (1938–2024), Soviet and Russian actress
