= Vasily Vilinsky =

Vasily Mikhailovich Vilinsky Василий Михайлович Вилинский
- Born: 3 September 1842; St. Petersburg, Russian Empire
- Died: 1 January 1875 (aged 32) Kharkov, Russia
- Occupations: Composer, conductor

Vasily Mikhailovich Vilinsky (22 August (3 September) 1842 - 20 December (1 January) 1875) was a composer, conductor, director, singer, actor, thespian and public figure during the reign of Alexander III.

== Biography ==
Vasily was born in St. Petersburg, Russia in autumn 1842, a direct descendant of the Vasily lineage as begun by Vasily Ivanovich Velinsky, the Starodubovsky city Ataman (1746-1748) in the Cossack Hetmanate. Vasily graduated from the Kyiv gymnasium where he studied at St. Petersburg University, additionally taking music lessons from the composer Alexander Serov. He moved to Kiev and continued his studies at Kiev University. In the local philharmonic organization at the time, he became an accomplished instrumentalist, singer, and actor. He became one of the founders of the Kiev branch of the Russian Musical Society (since 1863 - a member of the directorate, 1872-1874 - music director), founded by Anton Rubenstein in 1859.

In 1863-1865, he began working as a choirmaster and bandmaster at the Italian Opera in Kyiv. In 1867, he staged the opera "Natalka Poltavka" by N. V. Lysenko in the city theater. That same year, together with the entrepreneur and soloist F. Berger, he founded the Kyiv Russian Opera. Until 1874, Vasily was serving as the opera's chief conductor. He toured for a long time, in particular Odessa, and in the last year of his life he became the artistic director of the Kharkov Opera.

== Literature ==
1. Chechott V. A. Twenty-fifth Anniversary of the Kyiv Russian Opera. K., 1893
