= At the River (film) =

- Directed by: Eva Neymann
- Written by: Sergey Chetvertkov
- Produced by: Alexander Tkachenko
- Starring: Nina Ruslanova; Maria Politseymako
- Cinematography: Alexey Ubeyvolk
- Edited by: Irina Blogerman
- Production company: Odessa Film Studio
- Release date: June 2007 (Moscow)
- Running time: 84 minutes
- Country: Ukraine
- Language: Russian

At the River (Ukrainian: «Біля річки», romanized: Bilia richky; Russian: «У реки», romanized: U reki) is a debut feature film directed by Eva Neymann. It was entered in the main program of the Moscow International Film Festival in 2007 and was part of the 36th Rotterdam International Film Festival in 2007.

== Plot ==
One fine day from the life of two elderly women, mothers, and daughters who lived together all their lives. One day, a young official comes to them, who inadvertently makes his mother feel young again. On this sunny day, she decides to go with her daughter for a walk along the river. It's clear to both of them that the best days of their lives are in the past, and that, walking around like this, they make a comedic impression. But today they do not care — they enjoy a walk, good weather and a river.

== Cast ==
- Nina Ruslanova as Masha Konkova
- Maria Politseymako as Klavdia Petrovna Konkova
- Sergey Bekhterev as deputy's assistant
- Nataliya Buzko as Nastya's mother
- Yuri Nevgamonny as captain of a pleasure craft

== Awards and nominations ==
- Miskolc International Film Festival — Critics Award (won)
- Moscow International Film Festival — Golden St. George (nom)
- GoEast — Award of the Federal Foreign Office (won)
