= Anatoliy Lavrenishyn =

Ukrainian animation director and artist (born 1980)

- Born: 15 September 1980 (age 45); Kyiv Oblast, Ukrainian SSR
- Education: Kyiv National I. K. Karpenko-Kary Theatre, Cinema and Television University
- Occupations: Animation director, animator, artist
- Years active: 1999–present
- Awards: National Union of Cinematographers of Ukraine Award (2013)

Anatoliy Lavrenishyn (born 15 September 1980) is a Ukrainian animation director, animator, and artist. He is a key figure in contemporary Ukrainian animation, known for his award-winning films The Shop of Songbirds and Victor Robot.

== Biography ==
Anatoliy Lavrenishyn was born in 1980 in the Kyiv Oblast. From 1998 to 2004, he studied at the Kyiv National I. K. Karpenko-Kary Theatre, Cinema and Television University in the workshop of the renowned Ukrainian animator Yevhen Syvokin.

He works as a designer, artist, and animator for several animation studios. His work often blends traditional hand-drawn techniques with digital styles.

== Filmography ==
| Year | Title | Original Title | Role |
|---|---|---|---|
| 1999 | Night | Ніч | Animator |
| 2001 | Finches and Others | Зяблики та інші | Director, writer, production designer |
| 2002 | The Firefly | Світлячок | Co-production designer |
| 2008 | A Fun Fairytale | Прикольна казка | Animation director |
| 2010 | Childhood Friend | Друг дитинства | Animator |
| 2011 | The White Crow | Біла ворона | Animator |
| 2013 | The Shop of Songbirds | Крамниця співочих пташок | Director |
| 2020 | Victor Robot | Віктор Робот | Director |

== Awards ==
- 2014: National Union of Cinematographers of Ukraine Award for Best Animated Film (for The Shop of Songbirds).
