= Karmelyuk (1931 film) =

- Film poster
- Directed by: Faust Lopatinsky
- Written by: Stanislav Weiting-Radzinsky
- Based on: The play "Robbiynyk Karmelyuk" (1926) and the 1865 short story by Marko Vovchok
- Starring: Stepan Shagaida, Aleksandr Podorozhnyy, and Zinayida Pihulovych.
- Cinematography: A. Kaliushny
- Music by: Borys Lyatoshynsky
- Production companies: Dovzhenko Film Studios, Ukrainfilm
- Release date: September 6, 1931
- Running time: 54 minutes
- Country: Soviet Union
- Language: Silent

Karmelyuk (Ukrainian: Кармелюк), also Karmyuk, False Uniforms and From the Life of Karmalyuk, is a 1931 Soviet feature silent historical drama film directed by Faust Lopatinsky and shot at the Ukrainfilm studio. The plot of the film is based on the play Robbiynyk Karmelyuk (1926) and the 1865 short story by Marko Vovchok and was adapted for the screen by Stanislav Weiting-Radzinsky. The film stars Stepan Shagaida, Aleksandr Podorozhnyy and Zinayida Pihulovych. The score to the film was composed by Borys Lyatoshynsky.

Karmelyuk was released in the Ukrainian SSR on September 6, 1931. In 1935, a sound version with music was created through the efforts of sound engineer Y. Murin.

== Plot ==
In the 1830s, young Count Piglovsky returns to his estate from Paris. The carriage in which he is riding is surrounded by rebellious peasants. Their attempt to hang the master is canceled almost at the last moment because it is not the count in the carriage, but his lackey, Ustym Karmelyuk. Ustym leads a peasant uprising and the government sends the army. In a fierce fight, Karmelyuk is almost captured, but he is saved by one of the serfs.

The film's epilogue explains that Karmelyuk continued to fight with the lords for a long time.

== Cast ==
- Stepan Shagaida - Karmelyuk
- Aleksandr Podorozhny - young gentleman, Count Piglovsky
- Zinayida Pihulovych - Kylina's girlfriend, Karmelyuk's wife
- Valentina Rovinska - Miss Rosalia
- Ivan Tverdokhlib - a young man
- A. Nikitin - father of Count Piglovsky
- A. Belov - fat landowner
- Hanna Shubna - peasant girl
- Lavrentiy Masokha - boy
- Georgy Astafyev - Medved
- Kostyantyn Lundyshev, Yevhen Vikul, Hryhoriy Efremov — gentlemen

== Reception ==
The film was seen as a call to arms for the public and was subsequently banned by the government.

When the film was released in the United States in 1932 as False Uniforms, critic Harry T. Smith of The New York Times wrote that the film evoked memories of Uncle Tom's Cabin and the swashbuckling films of Douglas Fairbanks. Smith also wrote: "The scenes of rural Russia of three-quarters of a century ago are very interesting. The pursuit of the revolting serfs and the complication of disguises which sometimes keeps the audience wondering just who is in favor of the masters and who is against them contribute much toward making this film entertaining. The photography is excellent and work of the whole cast is good."
