= When Lightning Flashes Over the Sea =

2025 film by Eva Neymann

- Festival release poster
- Directed by: Eva Neymann
- Screenplay by: Eva Neymann
- Produced by: Kirill Krasovski
- Starring: Valeriy Bassel; Fadey Fadeev; Madona Hupenia
- Cinematography: Eva Neymann; Saša Oreškovič
- Edited by: Pavel Zalesov
- Music by: Martin Hossbach
- Production companies: Blue Monticola Film; Rundfunk Berlin-Brandenburg
- Release date: 15 February 2025 (Berlinale)
- Running time: 124 minutes
- Countries: Ukraine; Germany
- Languages: Ukrainian; German

When Lightning Flashes Over the Sea is a 2025 documentary film written and directed by Eva Neymann. The film portrays people in Odesa who are searching for dignity and dreams between war, loss and hope.

The film was selected in Forum at the 75th Berlin International Film Festival, where it had first screening on 15 February 2025.

== Cast ==
- Valeriy Bassel
- Fadey Fadeev
- Madona Hupenia

== Production ==
Principal photography began on 23 October 2023 at location in Ukraine. Filming ended on 15 April 2024 in locations in Odesa, Ukraine.

== Release ==
When Lightning Flashes Over the Sea had its world premiere in the Forum section of the 75th Berlin International Film Festival 15 February 2025.

It will have its Asian Premiere in the Standpoint of the 36th Singapore International Film Festival on 7 December 2025.

== See also ==
- Russo-Ukrainian War
