= Kseniia Zastavska =

Ukrainian film director

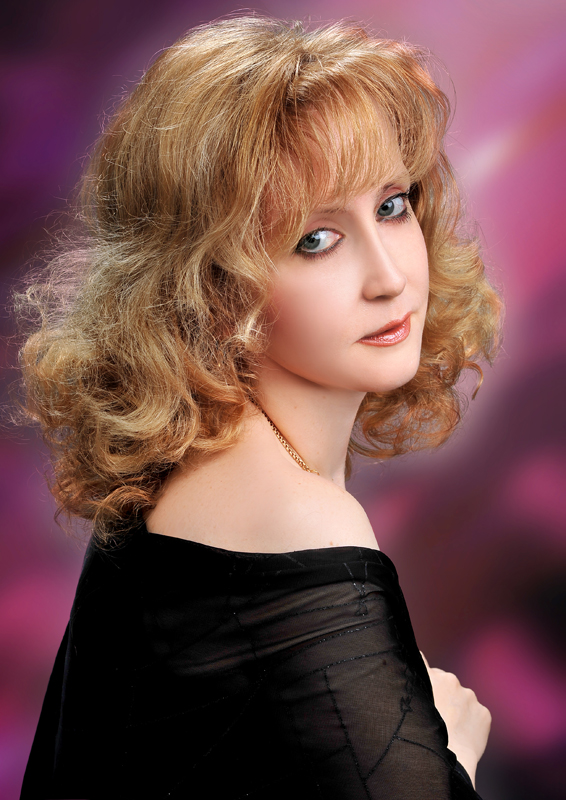
- Born: Oksana Volodymyrivna Prysiazhniuk; Odesa, Ukraine
- Occupations: Poet, writer and screenwriter

Kseniia Zastavska (Ukrainian: Ксенія Заставська), born Oksana Volodymyrivna Prysiazhniuk (Ukrainian: Оксана Володимирівна Присяжнюк) in Odesa, Ukraine, is a Ukrainian poet, writer and screenwriter.

== Education ==
Zastavska is a graduate of the Odesa Institute of National Economy (currently Odesa National Economics University). After undertaking a course in journalism provided by the editorial board of Vechirnia Odesa, she was taught script writing by the Odesa screenwriter Dmytro Kostromenko.

== Career ==
Zastavska is a member of the cinematography coordination council at Odesa City Council and a member of the Barwy Kresowe Polish-Ukrainian arts partnership organization. She has also been described as among Odesa's national treasures.

Zastavaska started her creative activity by writing the lyrics of children's songs. In collaboration with the composer and vocalist Liliia Ostapenko, she created songs performed by children's groups from Odesa, Kyiv and New York. She has also written the lyrics of songs for adult performers.

In 2015, Zastavska represented Ukraine at the Vilnius International book fair and had the honour of joining Valerii Zhovtenko, Ukraine's ambassador to Lithuania, in presenting Mascot of Love in Lithuanian to the President of Lithuania, Dalia Grybauskaitė. Zastavska used the occasion to thank the President for her support of Ukraine. In 2016, she returned to the fair to promote the Lithuanian translation of her novel Stek. Laces of Life.

She has translated and promoted the publication of a book by the notable Estonian writer, journalist and film director Imbi Paju, Hidden Memories. The presentation of the book was held on May 24, 2019 at the Embassy of Estonia in Ukraine. The book was also represented in the international program of the Art Arsenal on May 25, 2019, in Kyiv.

In March 2022, the film Carol of the Bells was awarded the main prize for writing and directing at the Women's International Film Festival in Nigeria. On April 1, the film opened a charity marathon of Ukrainian films in Warsaw, and on April 10, it represented Ukrainian cinema in Toronto.

== Bibliography ==
Books:

- "Shchedryk. Moia spovid" (2023)

Poetry:

- "Fantasies about Love" (2010)

Prose:

- "Galatea New Style" (2011)
- "Anna for Don Juan" (2012)
- "A Chanson for Two Voices" (2012)
- "Amber Saga" (2012)
- "Mascot of Love" (2013)
- "Stek. Laces of Life" (2016)
- "Veto to Happiness" (2017)
- "Refraction" (2018)

Translations:

- "Mascot of Love" (Lithuanian language, 2015)
- "Stek. Laces of Life" (Lithuanian language, 2015)
- "Mascot of Love" (Hungarian language, 2017)
- "Mascot of Love" (Slovak language, 2018)

Screenplays:

- "Aktrysa"
- "Stef" (2022)
- "Carol of the Bells" (2022)
- "BozheVilni" ("Diagnosis: Dissident", 2021)
- "Basel" (2021)
- "The Witch"

== Awards and honors ==
- for the script "Steph":
  - winner New York International Film Awards in the nomination "Best War Script" and "Best Drama Script" (2022, USA)
  - winner Best Script Award (London, United Kingdom) in the nomination "Best War Screenplay"
  - winner Prague International Film Awards in the nomination "Best Drama Screenplay" (Czech Republic)
  - winner Kosice International Film Festival in the nomination "Best Drama Screenplay" (Slovakia)
  - winner WRPNSC script competition (2022, USA)
  - finalist Los Angeles International Screenplay Awards Fall (2022, USA)
  - quarter finalist Park City 2023
  - honorable mention Changing Face International Film Festival (Australia)
  - quarter finalist Big Apple Film Festival Screenplay Competition (USA)
  - winner in the nomination "the best screenplay of the 2022–2023 season" Rome Prisma Film Awards (Italy)
  - winner Amsterdam International Film Festival 2022 (Netherlands)
  - semi-finalist Atlanta Film Festival – ATLFF (USA)
  - semi-finalist The Golden Script Competition, London (Great Britain)
  - semi-finalist Santa Barbara International Screenplay Award (USA)
  - semi-finalist Los Angeles Film Award – LAFA (USA)
  - semi-finalist International Screenwriting Competition – ISC (USA)
  - nominee SENSEI FilmFest 2023 (Japan)
  - nominee MAGMA Film Awards (USA)
  - nominee Toronto Film & Script Awards (Canada)
  - quarter-finalist Filmmatic – Pitch Now Screenplay Competition Season 5 (USA)
  - quarter-finalist THE BLASTOFF (USA)
  - quarter-finalist Outstanding Screenplays Feature Competition (USA)
  - quarter-finalist "Your Script Produced!" (USA)
  - quarter-finalist "Scriptation Showcase" competition (USA)
- for the script "Actress":
  - Gold Award WRPNSC (USA)
  - winner in the nomination "Best Unrealized Screenplay" LA Independent Women Film Awards (USA)
  - winner in the nomination "The best historical screenplay" Storyteller Film & Screenwriting Contest (USA)
  - winner in the nomination "Best Historical Screenplay" Hollywood Screenplay Awards (USA)
  - winner in the nomination "Best Historical Screenplay" Oniros Film Awards – New York (USA)
  - winner in the nomination "Best Historical Screenplay" New York International Film Awards (NYIFA, USA)
  - finalist in the nomination "Best Historical Screenplay" Las Vegas International Film and Screenwriting Festival (USA)
- honorary Diploma and statue “Odesa Treasure”
