= Boris Dobronravov =

Russian and Soviet actor

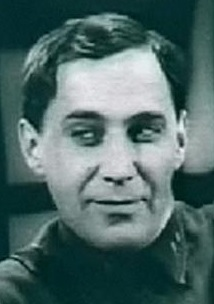
- Dobronravov as Gromov in the film Prisoners, 1936
- Born: Борис Георгиевич Добронравов; 16 April 1896; Moscow, Russian Empire
- Died: 27 October 1949 (aged 53); Moscow, USSR
- Occupation: actor
- Years active: 1915–1949
- Awards: Order of Lenin (1938), Order of the Red Banner of Labour (1937)

Boris Georgiyevich Dobronravov (Russian: Борис Георгиевич Добронравов; 16 April 1896 in Moscow, Imperial Russia – 27 October 1949 in Moscow, USSR) was a Russian and Soviet actor, associated with the Moscow Art Theatre.

The People's Artist of the USSR (1937), and a recipient of numerous high-profile state awards, including the Order of Lenin (1938) and the Order of the Red Banner of Labour (1837), he is best remembered for his parts in An Ardent Heart and The Storm by Alexander Ostrovsky (Narkis, Tikhon respectively), The Days of the Turbins (Mikhail Bulgakov, Myshlayevsky), Dead Souls (Nikolai Gogol, Nozdryov), The Cherry Orchard (Anton Chekhov, Lopakhin).

"Totally open and delivering instantly profound effect on stage, he was one of the very few, of whom it could be said that their performances were paid by their very heart's own blood," according to the theatre historian Inna Solovyova. Dobronravov, who always said his idea of a perfect death was the death on stage, died of heart failure after the curtain fell at the end of the second act of Tsar Fyodor Ioannovich, his 166th performance of the leading role, on the day of MAT's 51st anniversary. He is interred in Novodevichye Cemetery in Moscow. In 1920–1949 he was cast in 11 Soviet films, including Aerograd (1935) and The Virgin Land (1939).

The People's Artist of the USSR Elizaveta Alexeyeva (1901–1972), the MAT actress Maria Yulievna Dobronravova (1900–1964) and the Meritorious Artist of the RSFSR Elena Dobronravova (1932–1999), were his sister, wife and daughter, respectively.
