= Stepan Shagaida =

Ukrainian Soviet theater and film actor (1896–1938)

- Born: Stepan Vasilievich Shagardin; 9 January 1896; Biloholovy, Austria-Hungary (now Ternopil Oblast, Ukraine)
- Died: 12 January 1938 (aged 42); Kharkiv, Ukrainian SSR, Soviet Union
- Occupation: Actor
- Years active: 1922–1937

Stepan Vasilievich Shagaida (Ukrainian: Степан Васильович Шагайда, real name Stepan Shagardin; 9 January 1896 – 12 January 1938) was a Ukrainian Soviet theater and film actor.

== Biography ==
He served in the Red Army from 1920 until 1922. His stage career began during the years of the Russian Civil War in the regimental Drama Theatre of the 45th Infantry Division.

In 1922, he studied at the Drama Studio theater Berezil (now Kharkiv Taras Shevchenko Ukrainian Academic Drama Theatre). He began acting in films in 1924. In 1928, he became an actor of the Odessa and Kiev studios. He appeared in the films of Les Kurbas and Alexander Dovzhenko (The writer and director of Aerograd (1935)).

In the summer of 1928, he left the theater to work in cinema. In 1927–1930, at the Odesa Film Studio, he starred in the films A Child from the Forest, The Gem of the Seven-Sided Stone, Walking in the Way, The Museum Guard, The Digging Ground, I Give You a Gift, and Five Brides. In 1930, he played the lead role in the historical drama Karmelyuk, which Lopatinsky began staging at the Odesa studio and completed at the Kyiv Film Factory. Together with Shagaid's film crew, he moved to Kyiv, where he continued to work for the next few years.

At the end of 1937 he was arrested along with many Ukrainian film makers and shot in early 1938.

== Selected filmography ==
- 1924 – Vendetta as Deacon Gordiy Svyatoptitsyn
- 1926 – Vasya reformer as Mitya Kutsy
- 1931 – Karmelyuk as Karmelyuk
- 1932 – Ivan as Ivan's father
- 1935 – Aerograd as Stepan Glushak
- 1937 – Rich Bride as hairdresser Sidor Vasilyevich Balaba
