= Natalka Poltavka (film) =

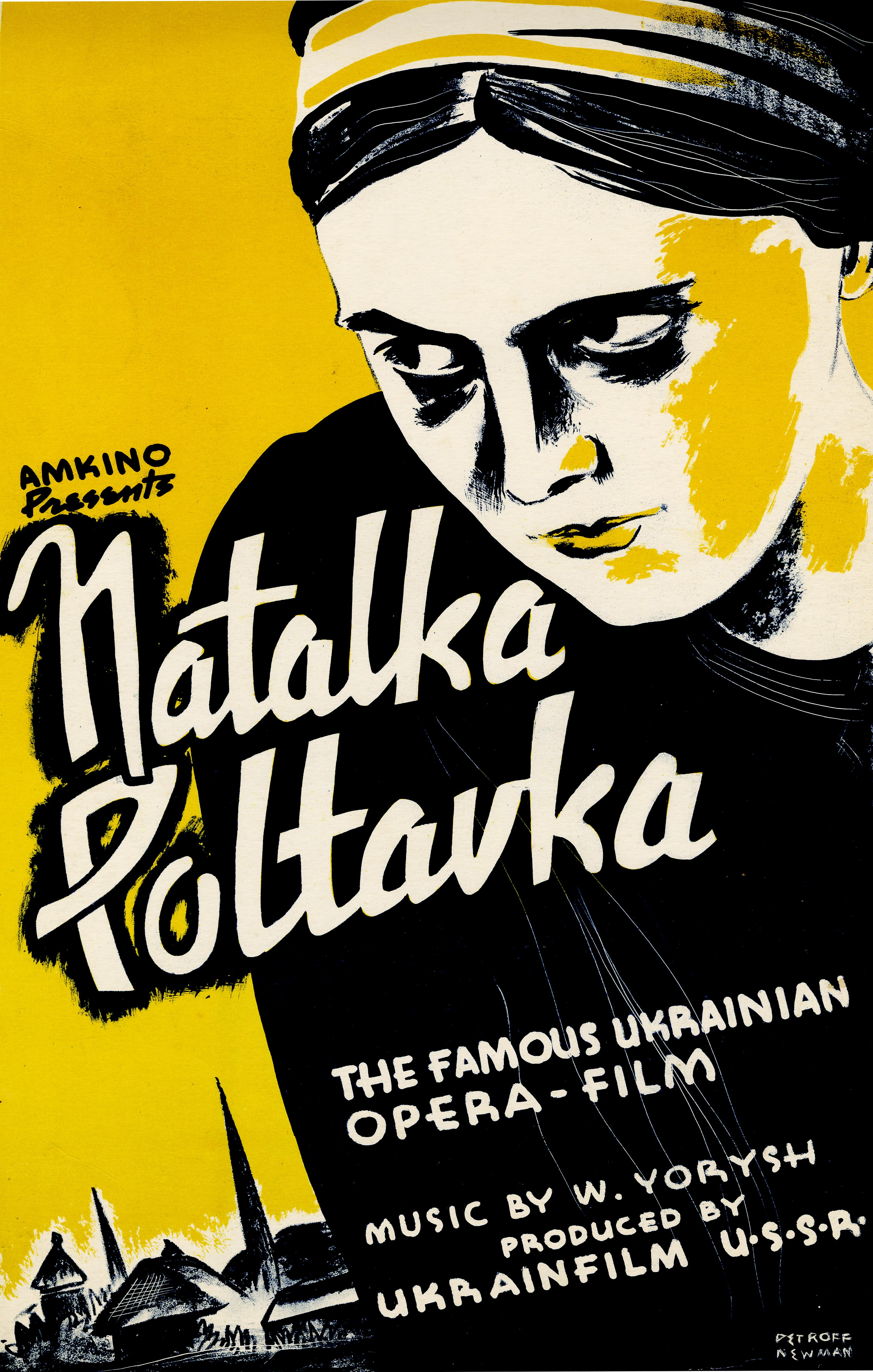
- Directed by: Ivan Kavaleridze
- Written by: Ivan Kavaleridze
- Starring: K. Osmyalovska; Ivan Patorzhynskyi; Stepan Shkurat; Hryhoriy Manko
- Cinematography: Georgy Khimchenko; Fedir Kornev
- Music by: Mykola Lysenko
- Production company: Ukrainefilm
- Release date: 1936
- Running time: 75 minutes
- Country: Soviet Union
- Language: Ukrainian

For the opera, see Natalka Poltavka (opera): For Ivan Kotlyarevsky's play, see Natalka Poltavka.

Natalka Poltavka is a 1936 Ukrainian feature film directed by Ivan Kavaleridze and shot by the Ukrainfilm studio. The film was remade in 1969 at the Dovzhenko Film Studios. The film was based on the opera by Mykola Lysenko (1842—1912), based on the play of the same name by Ivan Kotlyarevsky. The film was then reshot in 1937 by Vasyl Avramenko, the first Ukrainian film produced in the United States, and again in 1978 under the direction of Rodion Yukhymenko. This new version was extended to 90 minutes.

== History ==
The opera was the first opera-based film for the Ukrainian film industry and the first Ukrainian sound film in which the actors sang "under the plywood" for the first time. On 4 December 1936 the film had its United States premiere.

== Cast ==
Character	Actor/Actress
Natalka	Kateryna Osmyalovska (vocals sung by Maria Lytvynenko-Wolgemut)
Makogonenko	Ivan Patorzhynsky
Mykola	Stepan Shkurat
Wozniy	Hryhoriy Manko
Petro	M. Platonov
Terpylyha Horpina	Yuri Shostakivska

== Film Crew ==
- Director and screenwriter: Ivan Kavaleridze
- Operators: G. Khimchenko, Fedir Kornev
- Artists: Mylitsa Simashkevich, Iunia Mayer
- Costume designer: Vera Kutynska
- Sound operators: O. Prakhov, Andriy Demydenko
- Music editor: Volodymyr Yorish
- Editing director: Tatyana Demitryukova
- Conductor: Mykhailo Kanerstein

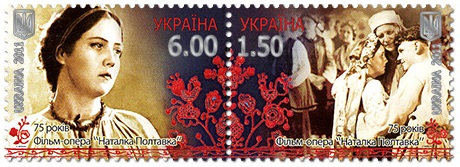
Postal stamps of Ukraine: "75 years. Film-opera "Natalka Poltavka" (No. 1132, No. 1133)

== Legacy ==
On 30 September 2011 the Ukrainian state postal company Ukrposhta circulated artistic postage stamps printed with a hook from two stamps to immortalize the first film opera in Ukrainian art: "75 years. Film-opera "Natalka Poltavka" (No. 1132, No. 1133), an envelope "The First Day," and a special redemption stamp. The artist for the stamps was Larisa Melnyk. The materials for creating stamps were provided by the State Museum of Theater, Music and Film Arts of Ukraine. One of the postage stamps depicts the main character of the film, Natalka, played by actress Kateryna Osmyalovska. The second shows the key scene of the film, where the mother blesses Natalka and Peter for a life together.

== Links ==
- NATALKA POLTAVKA / Feature film / Film studio "Ukrainfilm" // 1936 (VIDEO)
