= Sobor on the Blood =

- Written by: Ihor Kobryn, Yevhen Shafransky
- Directed by: Ihor Kobryn
- Theme music composer: Ihor Solomatin
- Original language: Ukrainian

Production
- Running time: 50 min. (10 episodes)

Original release
- Release: 2006

Sobor on the Blood (Ukrainian: «Собор на крові», lit. 'Unity on Blood') is a 2006 Ukrainian documentary series, produced as a joint project of Ukrainian TV channel 1+1 and Studio Telecon.

The series "Sobor on the Blood" covers the fight for Ukrainian independence from 1919 to 1949, with struggle framed as an important part of the European history on the whole. Figures discussed in the series include Yevhen Konovalets, Andriy Melnyk, Stepan Bandera, Andrey Sheptytsky, Taras Bulba-Borovets, and Roman Shukhevych.
