= Pawnshop (film) =

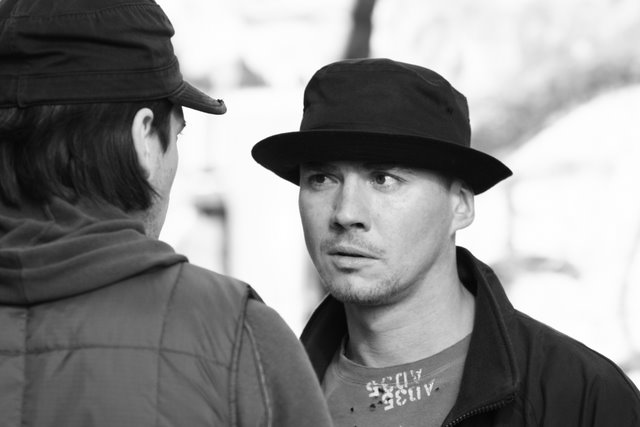
- Screenshot from the movie
- Ukrainian: Ломбард
- Directed by: Liubomyr Levytskyi
- Written by: Liubomyr Levytskyi
- Produced by: Andriy Savenko
- Cinematography: Oleksiy Khoroshko
- Music by: Yuriy Hrom
- Distributed by: B&H Film Distribution Company
- Release date: September 19, 2013
- Running time: 90 minutes
- Language: Ukrainian

Pawnshop (Ukrainian: «Ломбард», romanized: Lombard) is an adventure and crime film directed by Liubomyr Levytskyi. The premiere took place in Ukraine on 19 September 2013.

== Plot ==
The scene takes place in the present in the abstract city of Lemberg. The picture consists of three storylines that are cleverly intertwined. The main characters — two Lembergian guys, Mark and Yasha (Denys Nikiforov and Pavlo Piskun), know the street and know how to get everything you need for life. Mark called a noble bandit, and Yasha, on the contrary, everything is decided with the help of intelligence. Passing difficult twists and turns in his youth, the brothers begin to look for stability. It was one of those days they get the news of the inheritance. Them is known in a pawn shop and its owner at the moment is their uncle Felix. Arriving at the pawn shop for their guys receive a sharp rebuff. Mark and Yasha decide: any way to get the inheritance. Their opinions differ, and each comes up with his plan.

== Cast ==
- Denys Nikiforov as Mark Levin
- Pavlo Piskun as Yasha Levine
- Denys Dadaiev as "Aspirin"
- Valeriy Lehin as Uncle Felix
- Andriy Burym as a collector
- Olha Storozhuk as Rita
- Vasylisa Frolova as a jeweler
- Ihor Hniezdilov
- Serhiy Romaniuk as policeman
- Kostiantyn Koretskyi as Bob
- Serhiy Stakhov as Hopnyk
- Anatoliy Zinovenko
- Maksym Pankov as Michael, collector
- Volodymyr Beliaiev as crime boss
- Anatoliy Pryimak as bandit from brigade Mark
- Serhiy Shliahtych as policeman
- Olena Musiyenko
- Vitaliy Anisimov
- Alina Zavalska (only in the Director's version)

== Filming ==
The initial shooting of the film began in 2008 in Lviv and lasted from October 8 to October 17, 2008. The film crew visited the observation deck and courtyard of the City Hall, Vynnychenko Street, Soborna Square, Serbska Street, the intersection of Halytska Street and Rynok Square, and finally the Lychakiv Cemetery. The project was subsequently frozen in late 2008 and production resumed only in 2012, with filming taking place in Kyiv at the same time.

The initial, original director's cut of the film was 20 minutes longer than the theatrical version, and after the theatrical screening of the "producer's" version, it is planned to release a 20-minute longer version on home video. The SKY band wrote a song in a non-existent language called "Run" especially for the movie. Among the actors who made a cameo appearance in the film is the director of the movie, Lubomyr Levytsky, who played one of the audience members in the episode where Mark and Yasha are sitting in the movie theater.
