= Olesia Morhunets-Isaienko =

Ukrainian film director

- Born: November 17, 1984 (age 41); Kozelets, Chernihiv Oblast, Ukraine
- Occupations: Film director, producer, editor, screenwriter
- Years active: 2013–present

Olesia Morhunets-Isaienko (Ukrainian: Олеся Моргунець-Ісаєнко; born November 17, 1984, in Kozelets, Chernihiv Oblast, Ukraine) is a Ukrainian film director, producer, editor, screenwriter, member of the Ukrainian Film Academy. Wife of Andrii Isaienko.

== Biography ==
Olesia Mogrunets-Isaenko was born on November 17, 1984, in the village of Kozelets, now the Kozelets community of Chernihiv district, Chernihiv region, Ukraine.

She graduated of the Kyiv National I. K. Karpenko-Kary Theatre, Cinema and Television University.

She worked as a director and editing director in the company "Technomediia" (2006-2013). She taught editing in the studio of Taras Maliarevych (2011-2012) and in the children's studio "Red Dog" (2016-2017). In 2014, she received a presidential grant to create a script for the documentary film "Music of the Monocle" about the life and work of Danylo Demutskyi. She worked with the NGO "Open politics" (2016-2017).

Since 2015, she is a member of the jury of the international literary competition "Koronatsiia Slova".

== Filmography ==
Film director:

- "Svichado eternal" (2004)
- "Molfar" (2005)
- "Lubenochek" (2006)
- "Cars" (2008)
- "Violonchel" (2014)
- "The Tale of Money" (2017)
- "Frontier. The Grubeshev operation" (2019)
- "Deportation 44-46" (2021)
- "Carol of the Bells" (2022)
- "And every river" (2022)

Producer

- "Violonchel" (2014)
- "And every river" (2022)

Editor

- "Sakura" (2013)
- "Violonchel" (2014)

Screenwriter

- "And every river" (2022)

== Awards and honors ==
Awards and nominations of Olesia Morhunets-Isaienko
Year	Category	Film	Result
Kyiv International Film Festival "Molodist"
2015	National Competition	Violonchel	Won
2015	Best National Short Film	Violonchel	Nominated
Film and Art Festival "Two Riversides"
2016	Independent Short Films Competition	Violonchel	Nominated
Rivne International Film Festival "Dream City"
2019	National Program - Full-Length Documentaries	The Borderline. Hrubieszów Operation	Won
Women's International Film Festival Nigeria (WIFFEN)"
2022	Best Picture	Carol of the Bells	Won
