= Song of Songs (2015 film) =

2015 film

- Film poster
- Directed by: Eva Neymann
- Written by: Eva Neymann
- Produced by: Ihor Kolomoyskyi; Alexander Tkachenko; Stanislav Zurakhov
- Starring: Arseni Semynov; Karen Badalov; Vsevolod Shilovsky
- Cinematography: Rimvydas Leypus
- Edited by: Pavel Zalesov
- Production company: 1+1 Production
- Release dates: 5 July 2015 (Karlovy); 13 July 2015 (Ukraine)
- Running time: 75 minutes
- Country: Ukraine
- Language: Russian

Song of Songs (Ukrainian: «Пісня пісень», romanized: Pisnia pisen) is a 2015 Ukrainian drama film directed by Eva Neymann. It was screened in the Contemporary World Cinema section of the 2015 Toronto International Film Festival. It was named as one of three films shortlisted as the Ukrainian submission for the Academy Award for Best Foreign Language Film, but it was not selected.

== Plot ==
The film poetically depicts the Jewish town of the early 20th century, where ten-year-old Shimek and Buzya live. Of course, she is a princess and he is a prince. They live in neighboring palaces in the same yard. Shimek begins to realize his true feelings for Buza only years later, away from home, when he learns that she is marrying someone else.

== Cast ==
- Karen Badalov as Shimek's father
- Vitalina Bibliv as Shimek's mother
- Mikhail Bogdasarov as Uncle
- Yevheniy Kogan as Young Shimek
- Arina Postolova as Buzya
- Arseni Semyonov as Shimek
- Vsevolod Shilovsky as Melamed

== Accolades ==
Award / Film Festival	Date of ceremony	Category	Recipient / nominee	Result
Karlovy Vary International Film Festival	11 July 2015	Award of Ecumenical Jury - Special Mention	Eva Neymann	Won
Karlovy Vary International Film Festival	11 July 2015	Crystal Globe	Eva Neymann	Nominated
Odesa International Film Festival	18 July 2015	Best Picture	Eva Neymann	Won
Odesa International Film Festival	18 July 2015	Best Ukrainian feature	Eva Neymann	Won
