= Dad's Lullaby =

2024 film by Lesia Diak

- Directed by: Lesia Diak
- Screenplay by: Lesia Diak
- Produced by: Lesia Diak; Monica Lăzurean-Gorgan; Elena Martin
- Edited by: Andrei Gorgan
- Release date: 2024
- Running time: 78 minutes
- Countries: Ukraine; Romania; Croatia
- Language: Ukrainian

Dad's Lullaby is a 2024 feature-length documentary film by the Ukrainian film director and producer Lesia Diak.

== Synopsis ==
A war-scarred veteran, Serhiy, struggles to reconnect with his wife and three young sons. The documentary takes an intimate turn when Serhiy interviews the director about her own relationship with a veteran, exploring themes of love and loss in the aftermath of conflict.

== Release ==
The film had its world premiere in the Official Documentary Competition of the 30th Sarajevo Film Festival on 18 August 2024.

== Critical reception ==
Savina Petkova of Cineuropa wrote, "Lesia Diak's tender portrait of a Ukrainian war veteran as a father is not afraid to interrogate itself [...] It’s astounding how big of an impact keeping these self-reflexive scenes can have on an otherwise linear documentary and Lesia Diak is sensitive enough as a filmmaker to give in, in service of these moments of shared connection."

Amber Wilkinson of Screen International wrote, "Diak breaks from the straightforward observational technique during several evening conversations she has with Serhiy, in which he turns the camera on her, resulting in footage that is understandably raw. [...] Diak poignantly shows the battle for normality can be just as difficult as the fight for freedom."

Nick Cunningham of Business Doc Europe wrote, "The film is as much a portrait of a marriage, or of parenting, as life away from war."

=== Accolades ===
The film was nominated for the Heart of Sarajevo for Best Documentary Film 2024.
