= Victor Robot =

Victor_Robot (Ukrainian: «Віктор_Робот») is a Ukrainian feature-length animated film directed by Anatoliy Lavrenishyn, produced by Olena Golubeva, and written by Anastasia Lavrenishina.

The international festival premiere of the film took place on September 26, 2020, during the National Competition of the 11th Odesa International Film Festival. The Ukrainian film premiere of the film took place on June 24, 2021, and the distributor was Arthouse Traffic.

== Plot ==
The artificial Iron Star has stopped shining for some unknown reason, and a girl named Victoria and her parents are arriving on a starship to repair it. In search of the creator of the Iron Star, Victoria meets a robot who becomes her friend and acquires the name Victor.

== Awards ==
- "Kinokola" National Film Critics Award for "Best Animated Film" (2020)
- Audience Choice Award at the Odesa International Film Festival (2020)
- Best Feature Film for Children at the 13th Tofuzi International Animated Film Festival in Batumi (2021)
