= Ihor Kobryn =

Ukrainian film director (born 1951–2023)

Merited Culture Worker Ihor Kobryn
- Ігор Корбин
- Born: 2 February 1951; Lviv, Ukrainian SSR, Soviet Union
- Died: 10 December 2023 (aged 72)
- Education: University of Lviv; Kyiv National I. K. Karpenko-Kary Theatre, Cinema and Television University
- Occupation: Film director
- Years active: 1995–2023
- Organization: Director of Telecon studio
- Awards: see here

Ihor Dmytrovych Kobryn (Ukrainian: Ігор Дмитрович Кобрин; 2 February 1951 – 10 December 2023) was a Ukrainian film director and animator. Recipient of both the Merited Art Worker of Ukraine in 2008, and the Taras Shevchenko National Prize in 1989.

== Early life and education ==
Born on 2 February 1951, in the Ukrainian city of Lviv. He received his degree from Lviv University in 1973. He received his degree as a film and television director in 1981 from the Kyiv National I. K. Karpenko-Kary Theatre, Cinema and Television University. He has been employed at the Ukrtelefilm studio since 1982. The Telecon studio's creator and director since 1992.

== Career ==
Filming for the documentary series Chernobyl: Two Colors of Time started as Kobrin started to deal with the fallout from the Chernobyl nuclear power plant disaster. Notably, Kobrin directed the children's film Чудеса в Гарбузянах in 1985. Two of them are Марія (1988) and Про щастя співа Україна (1987).

Kobrin died at the age of seventy-two on 10 December 2023. Stella Klominskaya, one of his colleagues, broke the news of his death.

== Political positions ==
=== Perspective on Politics ===
Kobrin said in a 2018 interview that allies exist in politics instead of friends, and ours could not get this. They were unaware that everyone who opposed the reds was an ally rather than a temporary opponent. For this reason, white people—Denikin's volunteer army, Kolchak, and gold seekers in general—had something in common despite their disparate political ideologies: they opposed Bolshevism. He went on to say that historians should study history, while politicians should study politics.

=== Great Patriotic War ===
Kobrin said in a 2020 interview that there was, in reality, more than one conflict for him. They refer to this as the Great Patriotic War that the people fought since it was the conflict that separated them from World War II and was fought by the Stalinist dictatorship. In actuality, the people prevailed in the Great Patriotic War while Stalin lost his Second World War. It was evident from the moment he produced "1941" that the Communist Soviet Union and Nazi Germany were the two regimes that started World War II. Also, both systems competed for global dominance.

== Filmography ==
Throughout Kobrin's career, he has made several films:

- Чудеса в Гарбузянах (1985)
- Chernobyl: Two Colors of Time (1986–1988)
- Про щастя співа Україна (1987)
- Марія (1988)
- Пробудження (1992)
- Не хочу згадувати (1996)
- Заручники свободи (1997)
- Апельсинова долька (2004)
- Собор на крові (2006)
- Хлібна гільйотина (2008)
- 1941 (2013)
- 1945 (2020)
- Плавильний котел (2023)

== Awards and recognitions ==
With over thirty years of cinematography expertise, Kobrin has created and contributed significantly to over ten series and films, for which he has won several honors. For his significant personal contribution in honor of the victims of the Ukrainian people's genocide during the 75th anniversary of the Holodomor of 1932–1933, as well as his ascetic activities aimed at exposing the truth about the Holodomor, the director was named a Merited Culture Worker of Ukraine in 2008. He has won prizes at international cinema festivals held in Yugoslavia, Chicago, and Houston. Kobrin has been given the following membership and awards:

- Shevchenko National Prize (1989)
- Honored Art Worker of Ukraine (2008)
- Member of the Ukrainian Association of Cinematographers (1987)

Award	Year	Category	Nominated work	Result
Novi Sad Film Festival	1995	Grand Prix Golden Knight	Chernobyl: Two Colors of Time	Won
Chicago International Film Festival	1996	Golden Camera Grand Prix	Return to Chernobyl	Won
WorldFest-Houston International Film Festival	2002	Silver Prize	Return to Chernobyl	Won
National Award Teletriumph	2005	–	Собор на крови	Won
Media for Tolerance and Consolidation of Ukrainian Society	2005	Grand Prix	Собор на крови	Won
National Award Teletriumph	2005	–	1941	Won
