= The Road to Sich =

1994 Ukrainian historical drama film by Serhiy Omelchuk

- Directed by: Serhiy Omelchuk
- Written by: Bohdan Zholdak; Leonid Cherevatenko
- Produced by: Svitlana Osadcha; Larysa Nemyrovka; Varvara Romanenko
- Cinematography: Vitaly Zymovets
- Music by: Oleh Kyva
- Distributed by: Dovzhenko Film Studios; Veselka studio
- Release date: 1994
- Running time: 83 minutes
- Languages: Polish, Ukrainian, Crimean Tatar; English subtitles

The Road to Sich (Ukrainian: «Дорога на Січ», romanized: Doroha na Sich) is a 1994 Ukrainian historical film directed by Serhiy Omelchuk and based on the novel by Spyrydon Cherkasenko “The Adventures of a Young Knight”, about the events preceding the liberation struggle under the leadership of Petro Konashevych-Sahaidachny.

== Plot ==
The boy Pavlo Pokhylenko helps his father cultivate the field, his mother prepares lunch for them. Their peace is disturbed by the deputy of the Polish nobleman who assigns 10 days of work in the nobleman's field. The man refuses, resulting in a clash between him and the deputy. Pavlo's father is forced to flee from his native Kaniv to the lands of Sich.

When Pavlo grew up, he himself became a Cossack and for his dexterity he receives the nickname Pavlo Hopak (the name of a folk dance). The film ends with footage of him, together with other Zaporozhians, setting off along the Dnieper towards the Crimean Khanate to free the Cossacks in captivity and the peasants whom the Tatars drove into slavery.

== Starring ==
- Volodymyr Holubovych - Pavlo Pokhylenko
- Inna Kapynis - Orysya, Pavlo's beloved
- Mykhaylo Holybovych - Otaman Dzhmil
- Yuri Muravytskyi - Hetman Petro Sahaidachny
- Valeryi Shevchenko - Cossack priest

== Facts ==
The leading actor, Volodymyr Holubovych, died tragically while filming the film on September 18, 1994 in Kyiv. He was only 29 years old
