= Eva Neymann =

Ukrainian film director (born 1974)

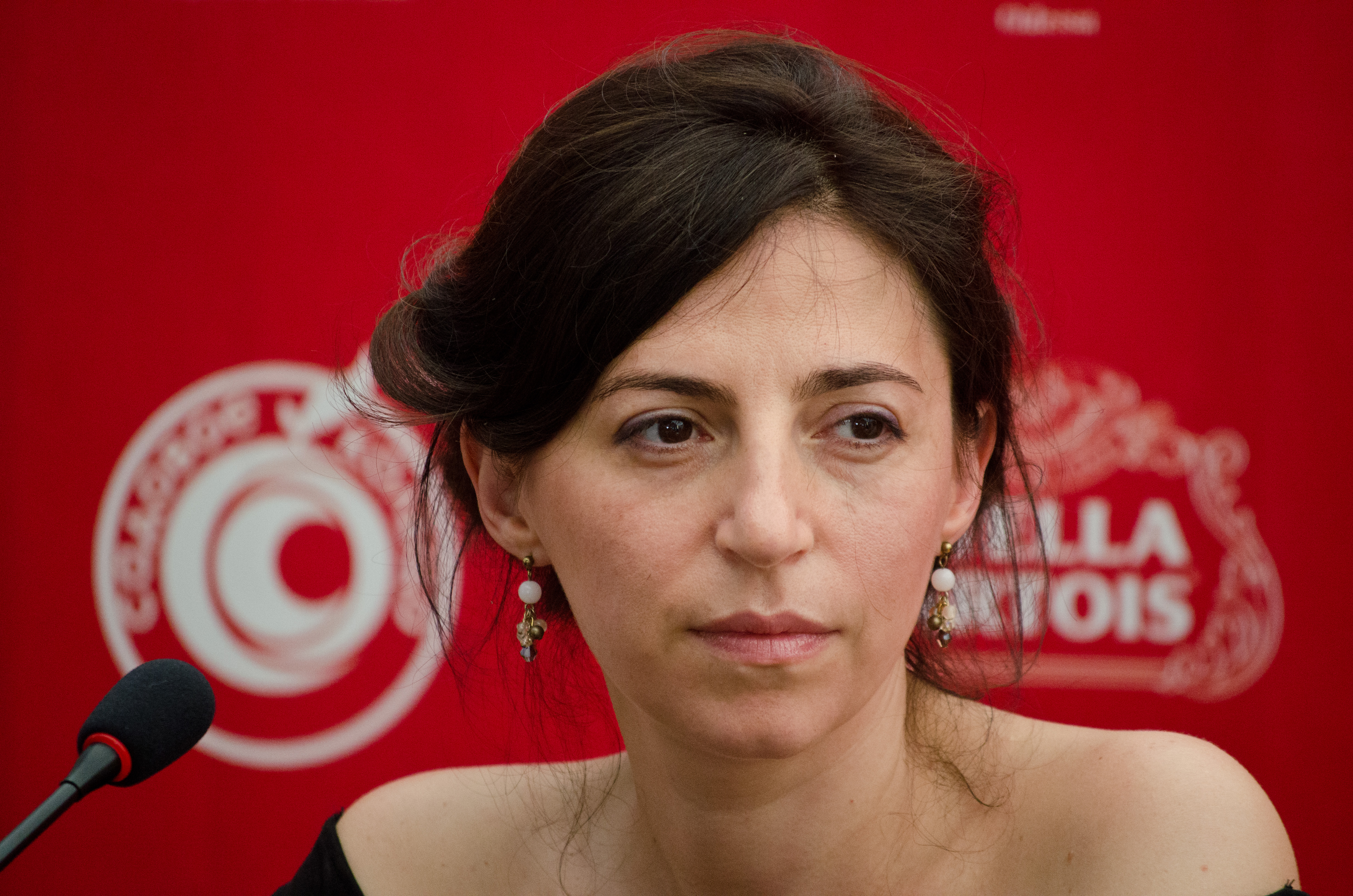
- Eva Neymann at the 6th Odesa International Film Festival
- Born: 21 June 1974 (age 51); Zaporizhzhia, Ukrainian SSR
- Occupation: Film director

Eva Neymann (Ukrainian: Єва Нейман; born 21 June 1974) is a Ukrainian film director. Her film At the River was entered into the 29th Moscow International Film Festival.

== Film career ==
In the 2020s, Neymann continued her focus on observational and documentary-style cinema, often centered on everyday life in Odesa, Ukraine. Her 2021 documentary Pryvoz examined the social and cultural dynamics of a historic Odesa marketplace and was screened at several international film festivals.

In 2025, Neymann directed the documentary When Lightning Flashes Over the Sea, a German–Ukrainian co-production portraying the lives of civilians in Odesa during the ongoing war following the 2022 Russian invasion.

== Selected filmography ==
Film
Year	Title	Role	Notes
2015	Song of Songs		
2012	House with a Turret		
2007	At the River		
2025	When Lightning Flashes Over the Sea		Director

=== Awards ===
- GoEast, Award of the Federal Foreign Office (At the River, 2007)
- Karlovy Vary International Film Festival, East of West Award (House with a Turret, 2012)
- Tallinn Black Nights Film Festival, Grand Prize (House with a Turret, 2012)
- International Istanbul Film Festival, People's Choice Award (House with a Turret, 2013)
- Karlovy Vary International Film Festival, Award of Ecumenical Jury - Special Mention (Song of Songs, 2012)
- Fribourg International Film Festival, FIPRESCI Prize (Song of Songs, 2016)
- Nashville Film Festival, Special Jury Prize (Song of Songs, 2016)
- Odesa International Film Festival Golden Duke (Song of Songs, 2016)
