= Prometheus (1936 film) =

1936 Ukrainian film

- Directed by: Ivan Kavaleridze
- Written by: Ivan Kavaleridze
- Cinematography: Mykola Topchiy
- Music by: Pavel Tolstyakov, Andriy Balanchyvadze
- Production company: Ukrainfilm
- Release date: 13 January 1936
- Running time: 84 minutes
- Country: Soviet Union
- Languages: Russian; Ukrainian

Prometheus (Russian and Ukrainian: Прометей, romanized: Prometey) is a 1936 Soviet war film directed by Ivan Kavaleridze. The film is an adaptation of the 1845 poem The Caucasus by Taras Shevchenko. At the centre of the development of Ukrainian cinema during the 1930s, the film was banned by Soviet censors shortly after its release for "bourgeois nationalist" themes. Since then, it has grown to be considered one of the greatest Ukrainian films ever made, and it is rated 30th on the Dovzhenko Centre's list of 100 greatest Ukrainian films.

== Plot ==
A young man, Ivan, is forcefully mobilised and sent to fight in the Caucasian War as a soldier of the Russian Empire by his landlord, leaving his wife behind. In the Caucasus, Ivas experiences the fierce local resistance to the Russian military, and returns home to launch an uprising against the Russian government.

== Cast ==
- Ivan Tverdokhlib - Ivan
- Polina Tabachnykova-Niatko - Kateryna
- Oleksandr Serdiuk - Svichka Pomishchyk, the colonel
- Ivan Straukh - Zhukov, the merchant
- Hnat Yura - Sydorenko, Svichka's manager
- Natalia Uzhviy - Nastasia Markivna
- Ivan Marianenko - General Ladanskyi
- I. Nekrutenko - Russian gendarmerie
- V. Yershov - Nicholas I of Russia
- Chuta Eristova-Zhgenti - Dadiani princess
- Danylo Antonovych - Gavrilov, the revolutionary
- Shota Nodzadze - Georgian prisoner
- Mykola Nademskyi - Taras Shevchenko

== Production crew ==
- Director - Ivan Kavaleridze
- Screenwriter - Ivan Kavaleridze
- Cinematographer - Mykola Topchiy
- Production designer - Vasyl Krychevskyi
- Composers - Pavel Tolstyakov, Andriy Balanchyvadze

== Release ==
Prometheus completed production in late 1935, and permission was given to Ukrainfilm (now known as Dovzhenko Film Studios) by the State Committee for Cinematography to release it. On 13 January 1936, the film had its first showing in Leningrad. Upon its release, it received mixed reviews, with filmmakers and Soviet state press initially supporting it, and Russian film critics strongly condemning it.

=== Ban ===
Despite early positive reviews in the press, on 13 February 1936, the article "A Crude Scheme Instead of Historical Truth" was published in Pravda, sharply criticising the film. Reportedly, the article was made on the personal orders of Soviet leader Joseph Stalin. The article accused Kavaleridze of several offenses, including formalism, naturalism, bourgeois nationalism. The "manifest failure" of Prometheus, according to M. Koltsov, the article's author, was that, "Instead of the historical truth shown by the means of art, it gives a crude scheme that distorts history."

Following the release of the article, the film was banned. The Ukrainfilm staff subsequently published an additional article, accepting the criticism. In March 1936, Kavaleridze wrote an article titled "Invaluable Help", in which he promised to "repent" for Prometheus by creating a new film which would take into mind the critiques laid out in Pravda. However, Kavaleridze's promises were poorly received by the newspaper, which noted that he "did not give a detailed critique of his mistakes."

After the film's ban, Kavaleridze was banned from working alongside minors, bringing an end to his Ukrainian Songs on the Screen series (including folk songs sung by youth). He was also barred from directing historical films, and instead only permitted to create operas.
