= Carol of the Bells (film) =

Ukrainian historical drama film

- Ukrainian: Щедрик; Polish: Szczedryk
- Directed by: Olesia Morhunets-Isaienko
- Written by: Kseniia Zastavska
- Produced by: Taras Bosak; Kolyubaev Artem Oleksiyovych; Maksym Leshchenko
- Starring: Yana Korolova; Andriy Mostrenko; Polina Gromova; Anastasia Mateshko; Joanna Opozda; Myroslav Hanishchevsky; Tomasz Sobczak; Alla Bineyeva, Christina Ushytska; Oksana Mukha
- Edited by: Roman Synchuk
- Production companies: Mainstream, Stewopol
- Distributed by: UFD (Ukraine)
- Release dates: 4 March 2022 (world); 5 January 2023 (Ukraine)
- Running time: 122 min.
- Countries: Ukraine; Poland
- Languages: Ukrainian, Polish, German, English
- Box office: ₴10,88 UAH millions (or 294 000 USD)

Carol of the Bells (Polish: Szczedryk, Ukrainian: «Щедрик», romanized: Shchedryk) is a Ukrainian historical drama directed by Olesia Morhunets-Isaienko based on the script by Kseniia Zastavska, released in Ukraine on 5 January 2023. The world premiere took place on 4 March 2022. The distributors of the film are Film.UA Distribution and Kinomania Film Distribution. Also known as Szczedryk (Poland) and «Щедрик» (Ukraine).

The film tells about the life of three families of different nationalities: Ukrainians, Poles and Jews, united by a common misfortune — war. After the repressive system of the USSR, they experience the punishing machine of the Nazi Germany.

== Plot ==
At the center of attention are children from three families: Ukrainian, Polish, and Jewish. They live in the city of Stanislaviv (now Ivano-Frankivsk) in neighboring houses. The Soviet regime, which arrived in 1939, deprived the children of their parents. And when Nazi Germany invaded the Stalinist empire during World War II, they experienced all the hardships of the hostile occupation of the Third Reich, which seemed hopeless. Overwhelmed, the girls find refuge with the singing teacher Sofia. Her daughter Yaroslava aspired above all to reconcile the world with the enchanting melody of the Ukrainian "Shchedryk." Throughout the war, they live as one family, singing songs, and waiting for liberation. However, the arrival of the Red Army and the restoration of Soviet rule turns their lives into even greater hardships: replacing voluntary confinement with forced confinement. Officials forcibly take the little girls from Sofia's shelter to an orphanage. They also kill a German boy whom a Ukrainian mother had taken in, suspecting him of Nazi activities, despite him being just a child. In the harsh conditions of brutal re-education, post-war oppression, and the confrontation of socialist USSR with the world, the girls do not lose their national identity. The words and music of "Shchedryk" by Mykola Leontovych connect their destinies, enduring decades of continuous suffering under German and Soviet oppression. To emphasize the diversity of cultures, the film features festive songs characteristic of each represented nationality. The film's creators also focus on the unique traditions of Christmas celebration among the Poles and Ukrainians.

== Cast ==
- Yana Korolova as Sofia Ivanyuk, singing teacher
- Andriy Mostrenko as Mykhailo Ivanyuk, father of the Ukrainian family, husband of Sofia
- Polina Gromova as Yaroslava Ivanyuk, Sofia's daughter (in childhood)
- Anastasia Mateshko as Yaroslava Ivanyuk (adult)
- Joanna Opozda as Wanda Kalinovska, mother of the Polish family
- Myroslav Hanishchevsky as Wacław Kalinovski, father of the Polish family
- Christina Ushytska as Teresa Kalinovska (in childhood)
- Oksana Mukha as Teresa Kalinovska (adult)
- Tomasz Sobczak as Isaak Hershkovich, father of the Jewish family
- Alla Bineyeva as Berta Hershkovich, wife of Isaak
- Yevgeniya Solodovnik as Dina Hershkovich (in childhood)
- Tetyana Krulikovska as Dina Hershkovich (adult)
- Milana Haladyuk as Talya Hershkovich (in 1939)
- Darina Haladyuk as Talya Hershkovich (in 1941)

== Production ==
The film, based on the script by Ksenija Zastavska, was produced in co-production between Ukraine and Poland, directed by Ukrainian director Olesia Morhunets-Isaienko. The project's funding was split equally between Ukrainian and Polish parties, with the Ukrainian portion of financing provided by Ukrainian State Film Agency. The casting of actors took place over a period of 2 months. The longest search was for actors for the roles of children and for the actress to play the role of Sofia Ivanyuk. Yana Korolova played her first leading role in a feature film with "Carol of the Bells".

== Release ==
The world premiere took place on March 4, 2022. The film has been screened in many countries, including Poland, Israel, the Americas, and Nigeria. Notably, the film was shown in Rome in September 2022. The Ukrainian premiere occurred on January 5, 2023, when the film was released in Ukrainian cinemas. The film premiered on the streaming platform Netflix on December 13, 2023.

== Accolades ==
The film was recognized as the best at the Women's International Film Festival Nigeria (WIFFEN).
