= Ivan (1932 film) =

1932 film by Aleksandr Dovzhenko

- Directed by: Aleksandr Dovzhenko
- Written by: Aleksandr Dovzhenko
- Produced by: Lev Kantorovich
- Starring: Petro Masokha; Stepan Shagaida; Konstantin Bondarevsky; Dmytro Holubynsky; Alexander Khvylya
- Cinematography: Danylo Demutsky; Yuriy Yekelchik; Mikhail Glider
- Edited by: Ganna Chernyatsina
- Music by: Boris Lyatoshinsky; Yuli Meitus; Igor Belza
- Distributed by: Ukrainefilm
- Release date: 1932
- Running time: 90 minutes
- Country: Soviet Union
- Languages: Ukrainian, Russian

Ivan (Ukrainian: «Iвaн», Russian: «Иван») is a 1932 Soviet drama film directed by Aleksandr Dovzhenko. After the critical lambasting of his film Earth by the Soviet authorities, Dovzhenko returned with a more popular iteration of its main motifs. Much like Earth, Ivan concerns itself with the natural rhythms of country life, disrupted by the beat of looming industrialisation.

Aleksandr Dovzhenko received a Special Jury Prize for the film at the 2nd Venice International Film Festival.

== Plot ==
Ivan (1932)

Landscapes of calm waters of the Dnieper, which are replaced by dangerous rapids, float in the frame. However, the construction of Dniproges is underway, workers are building a dam to bury the rapids under water and create a power plant. A village boy recounts a speech he heard at a construction site about the fact that the village has accumulated surplus labor, which should be sent to cities. There is a young Ivan in the house, who approves the plan. But Ivan's father, Stepan, denies — “I want to go, I do not want — I will not go.” The future foreman Stepan Vasilyevich has a different opinion, he believes that it is necessary to set an example to other villages and be the first to send aid for construction.

The foreman meets the secretary of the party committee, his friend, with whom he has not seen for 22 years, at the construction site. Ivan is delighted with the landscapes of the Dnieper, as a huge river is tamed. He enthusiastically works on the railway, unlike his father, who works dishonestly, looking to avoid work. Ivan, however, lacks education, and his efforts, though great, are of little use. The foreman remarks: a lot of work, but done sloppily, will lead to trouble.

Embarrassed, Ivan realizes that he lacks education. At night, he studies engineering, which his father despises. Subsequently, an accident occurs at the construction site, a bucket of cement falls on the driver and he dies. The secretary explains to someone on the phone that the worker died as a result of other people's safety violations. A council of Komsomol members is convened to inspect all mechanisms at the construction site. A whole team of high-class specialists arrives at Dniproges to command workers and introduce new methods. Stepan is missing work. The foreman of the "black box office" (where salaries are given to violators) shames Stepan, listing through a loudspeaker how much he eats in vain every day. Then he complains to another foreman that lazy "peasants" were sent to Dniproges and comically sprinkles philosophical terms.

Ivan complains that his efforts have not been properly appreciated, he thinks that he has no place on the Dnieper. At the same time, the secretary is sure that "there will be people" from him. He was soon accepted into the Communist Party as a leader. Ivan speaks on the radio, exposing his father's laziness and absenteeism, demanding to "divorce him." These shots are interspersed with a comic insert with a commoner and his wife: a woman wants to listen to foreign radio, the commoner succumbs, but then hesitates and eventually switches the radio to Soviet propaganda.

Stepan bursts into the meeting, where he shouts that he refuses such a son, tries to attribute a high status to himself, repeating the words heard earlier from the foreman. But those present laugh at Stepan. Ivan enters and says that he is ashamed to be with his father from the same village. Ivan is "adopted" by the working class. She is followed by the mother of the deceased worker and calls for hard work to prove that her son's death was not in vain. Inspired, Ivan goes to study at the robotics faculty.

== Cast ==
- K. Bondarevsky as Young Ivan (as Konstantin Bondarevsky)
- Dmitry Golubinsky as Secretary
- Elena Golki as Mother of Killed Worker (as Elena Golik)
- Maksim Gornatko
- Aleksandr Zapolsky as Supervisor (as Alexander Zapolski)
- Pyotr Masokha as Ivan Guba (as Peter Masokha)
- Nikolai Nademsky
- Peter Pastushkov
- Stepan Shagaida as Stepan Vasiliyevich, the foreman
- Stepan Shkurat as Stepan Iosovich Guba, the idler

== Creation ==
From June to September 1930, Aleksandr Dovzhenko, along with Daniel Demutsky and Yulia Solntseva, visited Czechoslovakia, Germany, England and France. In Prague, cinema directors called his films too revolutionary and overly artistic. His plans to voice "Earth" in Berlin did not materialize. Returning to the USSR, he offered Ukrainefilm's management a script about the tragic fate of the Antarctic expedition of Umberto Nobile and Roald Amundsen, but was refused. To continue working, Dovzhenko agreed to make a film imbued with communist ideology about the construction of the Dnieper Dam and at the same time his first sound film — which should confirm the irreversible path of industrialization in the USSR. The script was written in 11 days, but Dovzhenko himself almost never shot it, entrusting it to his assistant and wife Yulia Solntseva. The filming was based on low-quality equipment, because Dovzhenko had to finish work quickly before the October holidays of 1932. In addition, the incompetence of the staff of the film studio led to poor sound. The film was edited for several nights.
