= Maria Politseymako =

Soviet and Russian actress (1938–2024)

- Мария Полицеймако
- Born: Marina Vitalievna Politseymako; 10 February 1938; Leningrad, Russian SFSR, USSR
- Died: 10 September 2024 (aged 86); Moscow, Russia
- Occupation: Actress
- Years active: 1964–2024
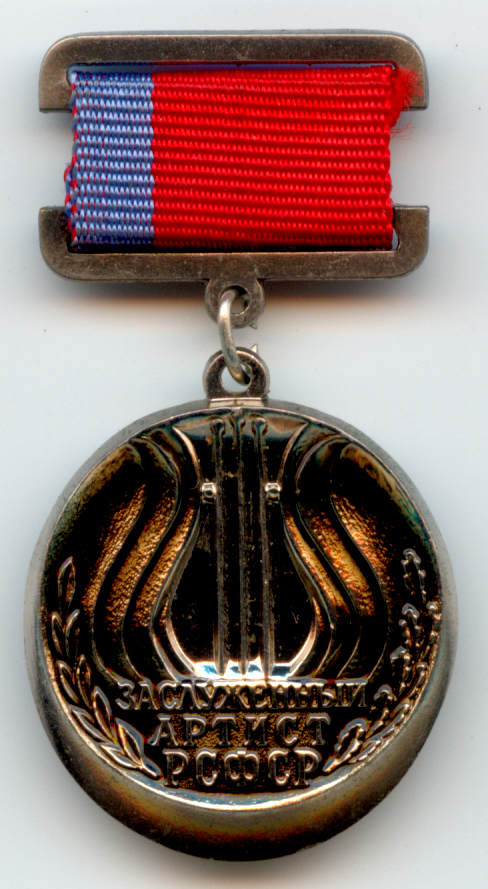
- Awards: (1988); Crystal Turandot (2009)

Maria Vitalievna Politseymako (Russian: Мари́я Вита́льевна Полицейма́ко; 10 February 1938 – 10 September 2024) was a Soviet and Russian theatre and film actress, an Honored Artist of the RSFSR. She was an actress of Taganka Theatre.

== Personal life and death ==
Maria Politseymako was a daughter of Tovstonogov Bolshoi Drama Theater actor Vitaly Politseymako.

Politseymako was the wife of the actor of theatre Semyon Farada. Her son is the actor and television presenter Mikhail Politseymako.

Politseymako died on 10 September 2024, at the age of 86.
