= Natalka Poltavka (opera) =

Ukrainian opera, 1899, based on Ivan Kotliarevsky play

- Opera by Mykola Lysenko
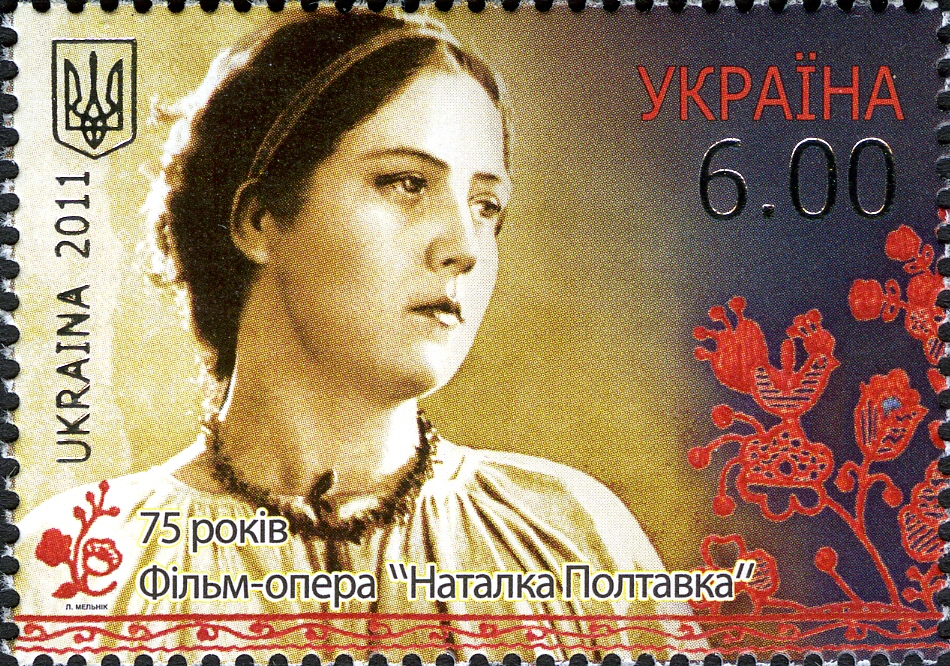
- Kateryna Osmialovska in the role of Natalka Poltavka from the opera's 1936 film adaptation on a 2011 stamp of Ukraine
- Language: Ukrainian
- Based on: Natalka Poltavka by Ivan Kotlyarevsky
- Premiere: 24 November 1889 (in Russian); Odessa

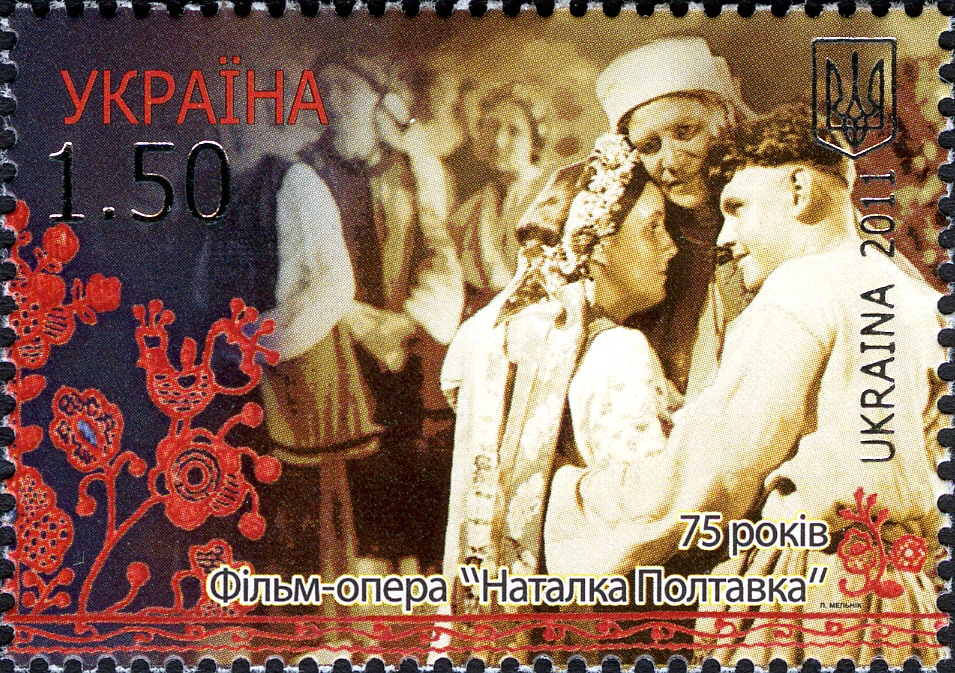
Natalka Poltavka on a 2011 stamp of Ukraine

Natalka Poltavka (Ukrainian: Наталка Полтавка, lit. 'Natalka from Poltava') is an opera in three acts by the Ukrainian composer Mykola Lysenko, based on the play Natalka Poltavka by Ivan Kotlyarevsky, first performed in 1889.

== Background ==
The original version of Kotlyarevsky's play in 1819 contained a number of Ukrainian folk songs which were sung at different points throughout the work. The first known musical adaptation of the play was made by Kharkiv musician A. Barsytsky and was published in 1833. Simultaneously, the play starring M. Shchepkin as Vyborny was premiered in Moscow in the 1830s with music arranged by the head violinist and later conductor A. Gurianov. Later arrangements were made by A. Yedlichka, M. Vasyliev and others.

== Lysenko's version ==
Lysenko began to work on the opera in 1864 but put it aside, lacking experience in writing for the opera stage. His eventual 1889 version upstaged all the previous versions of the work. Lysenko took the original songs from the play, which were lengthened, and wrote orchestral accompaniments to the folk songs and dances in the play. He enlarged the musical tapestry, producing background music to some parts. The songs were transformed into arias, and an overture and musical entracts were added which stayed true to the spirit of Kotlyarevsky's play. Although Lysenko's version is usually categorised as an operetta, it is more comparable to an opera-comique, containing as it does long stretches of spoken dialogue.

Attempts were made to transform the work into "Grand Opera" with the addition of music by V. Iorish were not successful. The Kiev State Opera returned to Lysenko's original version.

== Performances ==
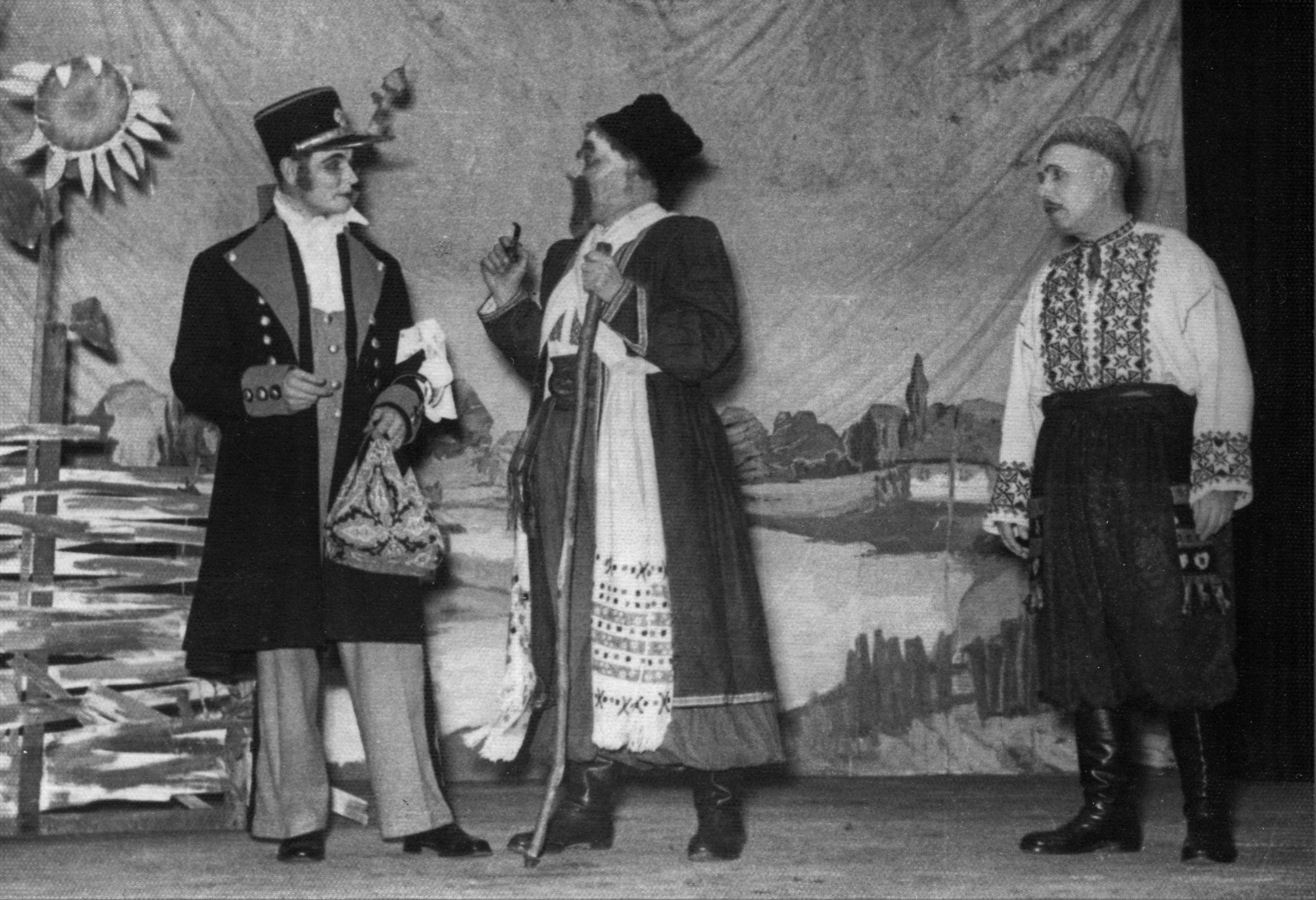
1951 performance of Natalka Poltavka in Sydney

The opera was first performed in Odessa (in Russian), on 12/24 November 1889.

An early exponent of the role of Mykola was Fyodor Stravinsky, father of the composer Igor Stravinsky.

The opera has been performed by the Ukrainian State Opera since 1925, and also by the Opera Studio of the Kiev Conservatory since World War II. During this period the parts have been performed by leading Ukrainian singers including M. Shchepkin, M. Kropivnytsky, P. Saksahansky, M. Zankovetsky, I. Patorzhynsky, M. Lytvynenko-Volhemut, M. Donets and O. Petrusenko.

In 2007 a variant was produced at the Kiev Opera with the orchestra supplemented by Ukrainian folk instruments. This version received moderate acclaim. The opera was chosen for the November 2022 reopening of the Kyiv Opera.

== Synopsis ==
=== Act I ===
Natalka awaits the return of her fiance Petro, who is working abroad. She is noted by the elderly landowner Vozniy, who persuades Viborniy to intercede with her on his behalf.

=== Act II ===
Viborniy persuades Natalka's mother, Terpilikha, that her daughter should marry the wealthy Vozniy, rather than await the uncertain return of Petro. The village maidens prepare Natalka for her wedding, although she is in despair.

=== Act III ===
Petro returns: Mykola informs him of Natalka's engagement. Natalka appears and tells Petro she loves only him. Terpilikha objects, and Petro undertakes to leave the village if it will prevent bad feeling. Touched by this gesture, Vozniy relents and all ends happily.

== Film adaptation ==
Lysenko's opera was made into a film that was released in Ukraine on 24 December 1936. The film was directed by Ivan Kavaleridze. This film was the first adaptation of an operetta produced in the former Soviet Union.
