= Aerograd =

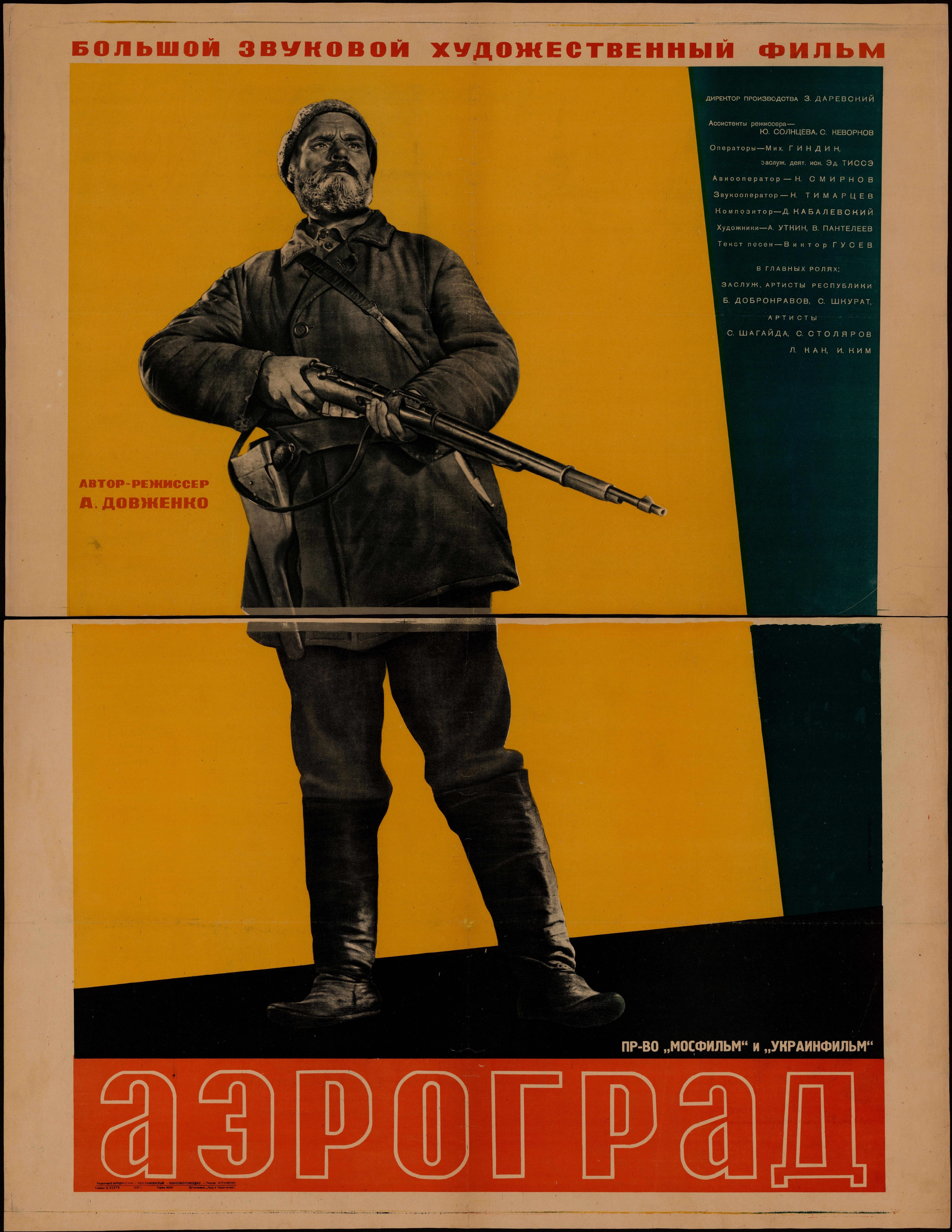
- Directed by: Oleksandr Dovzhenko
- Written by: Oleksandr Dovzhenko
- Produced by: Oleksandr Dovzhenko
- Starring: Stepan Shagaida; Sergei Stolyarov; Yevgeniya Melnikova; Stepan Shkurat; Boris Dobronravov; Yelena Maksimova; Vladimir Uralsky
- Cinematography: Mikhail Gindin; Nikolai Smirnov; Eduard Tisse
- Music by: Dmitri Kabalevsky
- Release date: 6 November 1935
- Running time: 82 min.
- Country: Soviet Union
- Language: Russian

Aerograd (Russian: «Аэроград», Ukrainian: «Аероград», also referred to as Air City or Frontier) is a 1935 Soviet drama film by Ukrainian director Oleksandr Dovzhenko, a coproduction between Mosfilm and VUFKU. It is an adventure story set in the Soviet Far East in the future.

== Plot ==
A Russian outpost in Eastern Siberia comes under threat of attack by the Japanese in this patriotic film from 1935. Aerograd is a new town with a strategically located airfield of vital interest to the government. Work on the new outpost is complicated when tensions develop between workers and a religious sect. The sect threatens to give their support to a band of marauding samurai warriors who battle for control of the region. Relations between the two countries are further strained in the days before World War II, dating back to the Russo-Japanese War of 1905. In this feature, the Russians are victorious as airplanes throughout the country come to the aid of the beleaguered new town.

== Cast ==
- Stepan Shagaida as Stepan Glushak
- Sergei Stolyarov as Vladimir Glushak
- Yevgeniya Melnikova
- Stepan Shkurat as Vasili Khudiakov
- Nikon Tabunasov as Young Chukcha
- Boris Dobronravov as Aniky Shavanov
- Yelena Maksimova as Maria Kudina
- Vladimir Uralsky as Yefim Kosa, partisan
- Ekaterina Korchagina-Aleksandrovskaya as old believer
