= Ivan Kavaleridze =

Ukrainian soviet sculptor, actor and film director (1887–1978)

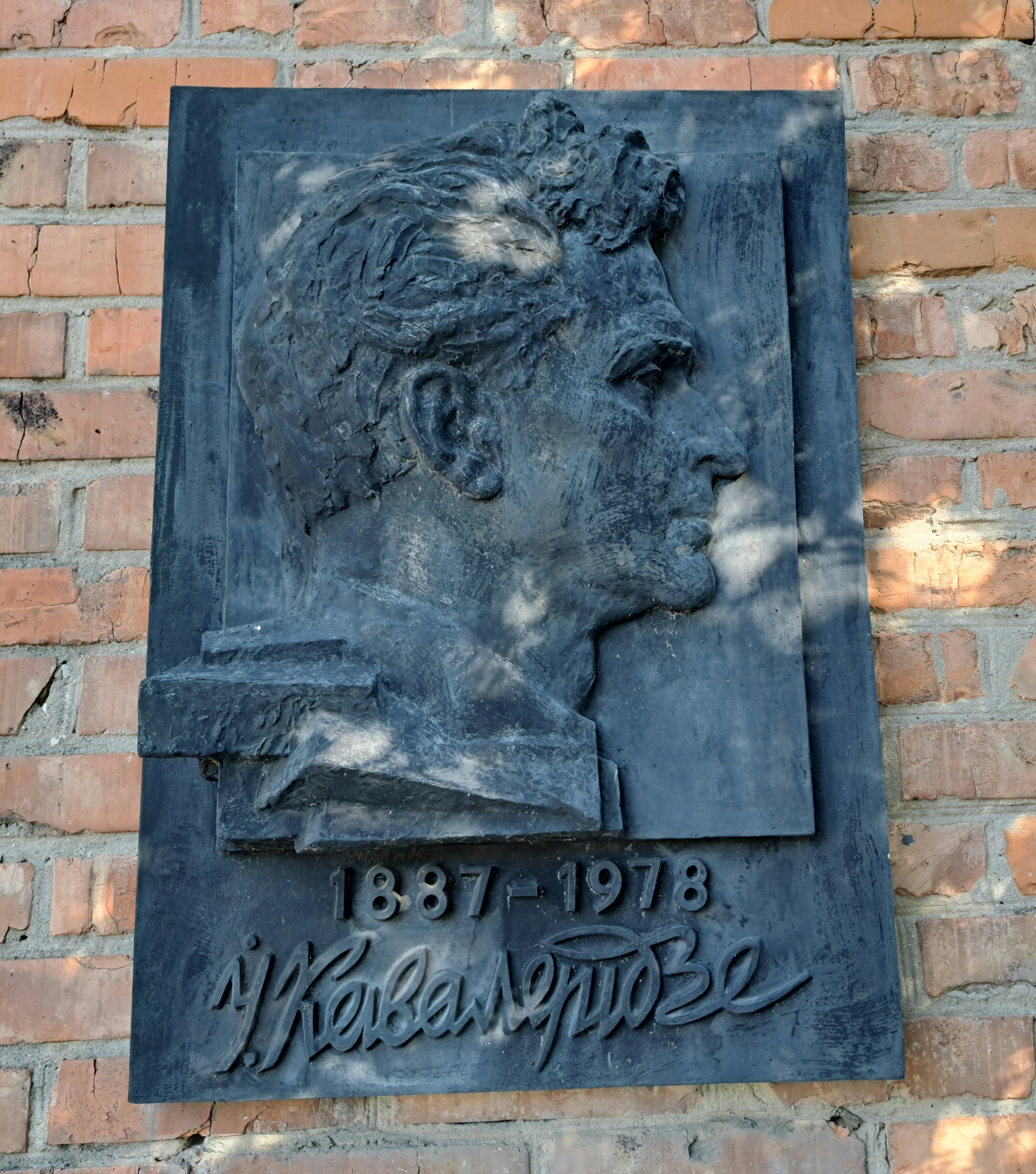
- Kavaleridze's profile on a memorial plaque in Romny
- Born: 13 April [O.S. 1 April] 1887; Ladanskyi, Kharkov Governorate, Russian Empire
- Died: 3 December 1978 (aged 91); Kyiv, Ukrainian SSR
- Occupations: Sculptor, writer, filmmaker
- Writing career
- Language: Ukrainian

Ivan Petrovych Kavaleridze (Ukrainian Іван Петрович Кавалерідзе; 13 April [O.S. 1 April] 1887 – 3 December 1978) was a Ukrainian-Soviet sculptor, filmmaker, film director, playwright and screenwriter.

== Life ==
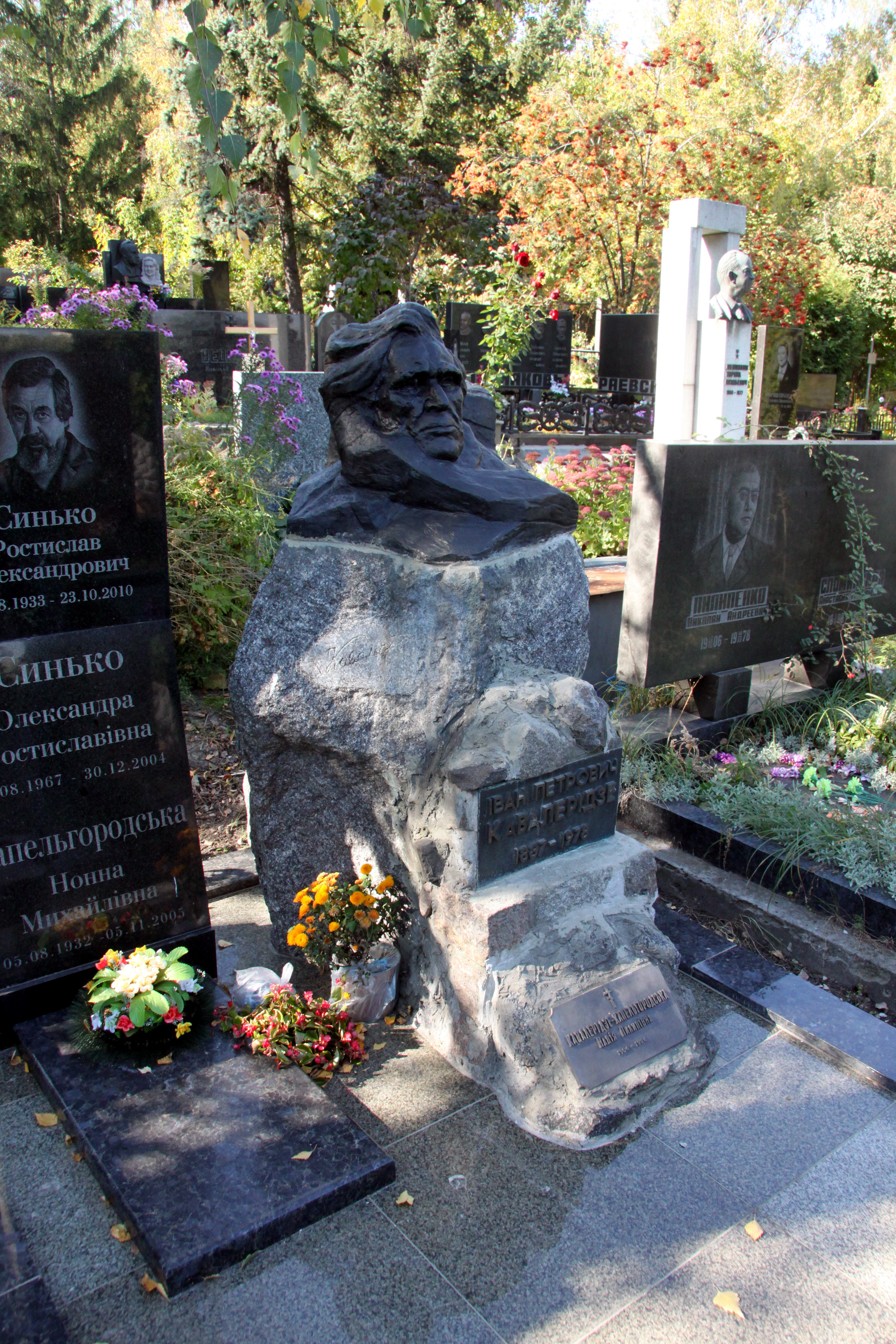
The grave of Ivan Kavaleridze at Baikove Cemetery

Kavaleridze was born in Ladanskyi (now Novopetrivka, Romny Raion, Sumy Oblast, Ukraine). He descended from a Georgian family transplanted by a Russian general into Ukraine in the middle of the 19th century.

From 1907 to 1909, Kavaleridze studied at the Kyiv Art School; from 1909 to 1910, he was an art student at the Imperial Academy of Arts; from 1910 to 1911, he studied with Naum Aronson, in Paris. By 1910, he was noted for running his own amateur theater company in Romny. Kavaleridze also sculpted a marble monument to Rus' saints in 1911 at Volodymyrska Street. It was restored in 1996 after it was taken down by the Communists in 1934. In 1918 to 1920, he created monuments to Taras Shevchenko and Gregory Skovoroda. Shevchenko's statue, which was erected opposite Kyiv University, became a location for nationalist demonstrations during the 1960s and 1980s.

From 1928 to 1933, he worked as an artist, writer and director in the Odessa Film Studio, and from 1934 and 1941 in Kyiv Film Factory. In 1936, Kavaleridze released the screen adaptation of Mykola Lysenko's Natalka Poltavka. It was the first film-opera in the Soviet cinema. From 1957 to 1962, he was a director at the Dovzhenko film studio.

He is buried at the Baikove Cemetery.

== Works ==
=== Notable sculptures ===
- Monuments to Taras Shevchenko in Romny and Poltava (1918)
- Monument to Hryhorii Skovoroda in Lokhvytsia (1922)
- Monument to Artyom in Sviatohirsk (1927)
- Tolstoy and Gorky (1952)
- Gorky and Shalyapin (1954)
- Shalyapin as Don Quijote (1954)
- Buchma as Zadorozhnyi (Stolen Happiness) (1954)
- Bohdan Khmelnytskyi Sending Kobzars to Villages (1954)

=== Filmography ===
- Torrent (Ukrainian: Злива, 1929) – based on Taras Shevchenko's Haidamaky
- Perekop (1930)
- Koliivshchyna (1933)
- Prometheus (1936)
- Natalka Poltavka (1936)
- Hryhoriy Skovoroda (1958)
