= List of actors from Ukraine =

This list includes Ukrainian actors and actresses.

It includes performers who have appeared in film, television, and theatre, both within Ukraine and internationally. Actors are listed in alphabetical order by their surnames and by their English-transliterated names.

== A-E ==
- Pavlo Aldoshyn (born 1987)
- Dasha Astafieva (born 1985)
- Larisa Bakurova (born 1985)
- Lidiya Belozyorova (born 1945)
- Bohdan Beniuk (born 1957)
- Halyna Bezruk (born 1988)
- Vitalina Bibliv (born 1980)
- Stanislav Boklan (born 1960)
- Anna Borisoglebskaya (1868-1939)
- Vera Brezhneva (born 1982)
- Boryslav Brondukov (1938-2004)
- Amvrosy Buchma (born 1891)
- Victoria Bulitko (born 1983)
- Eva Bushmina (born 1989)
- Nataliya Buzko (born 1963)
- Oksana Cherkashyna (born 1988)
- Natalka Denysenko (born 1989)
- Viacheslav Dovzhenko (born 1976)
- Georgy Drozd (1941-2015)
- Irina Dvorovenko (born 1973)
- Nikita Dzhigurda (born 1961)

== F-J ==
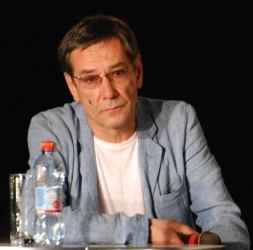
Oleksiy Gorbunov

- Olga Fedori (born 1984)
- Vera Filatova (born 1982)
- Arkady Gartsman (born 1947)
- Oleksiy Gorbunov (born 1961)
- Vitalik Havryla (born 1998)
- Gregory Hlady (born 1954)
- Roman Hryshchuk (born 1989)
- Pylyp Illenko (born 1977)
- Andriy Isayenko (born 1986)

== K-O ==
- Oleksiy Khilskyi (born 1987)
- Valeriya Khodos (born 1986)
- Olena Khokhlatkina (born 1968)
- Mariya Khomutova (born 1987)
- Antonina Khyzhniak (born 1990)
- Volodymyr Komarov (born 1964)
- Masha Kondratenko (born 1999)
- Yevhen Koshovyi (born 1983)
- Alina Kovalenko (born 1992)
- Nataliya Kozhenova
- Vladimir Kozlov (born 1969)
- Olena Kravets (born 1977)
- Olga Kurylenko (born 1979)
- Kateryna Kuznetsova (born 1987)
- Olena Lavrenyuk (born 1982)
- Pavlo Lee (born 1988)
- Olga Lezhneva (born 1983)
- Vitalii Linetskyi (born 1971)
- Artur Lohai (born 1993)
- Victoria Malektorovych (born 1972)
- Tetiana Malkova (born 1988)
- Marina Mazepa (born 1997)
- Dasha Medova (born 1990)
- Dmytro Miliutenko (1899-1966)
- Pavel Morozenko (born 1939)
- Ivan Mykolaichuk (1941-1987)
- Maria Mykolaichuk (born 1941)
- Rayisa Nedashkivska (born 1943)
- Yevhen Nyshchuk (born 1972)

== P-T ==
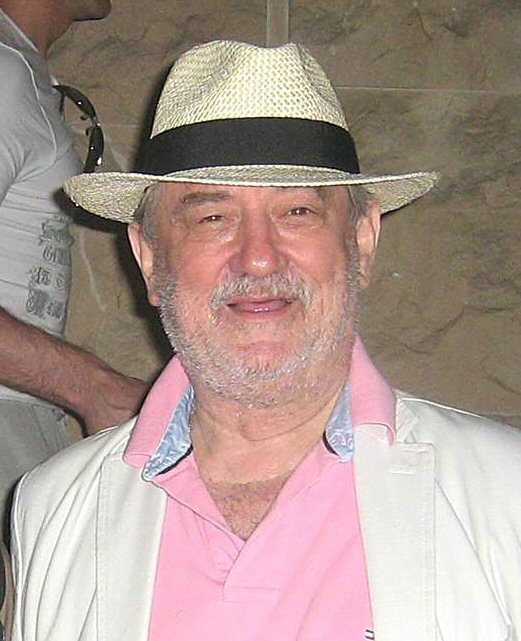
Bohdan Stupka

- Oleksandr Pikalov (born 1976)
- Oleksandr Piskunov (born 1991)
- Maryna Poplavska (born 1970)
- Taisia Povaliy (born 1964)
- Serhiy Prytula (born 1981)
- Ruslana Pysanka (1965-2022)
- Sergiy Romaniuk (1953-2019)
- Ada Rohovtseva (born 1937)
- Oleksandr Rudynskyi (born 1996)
- Ivanna Sakhno (born 1997)
- Ivan Koval-Samborsky (1893-1962)
- Anna Sedokova (born 1982)
- Verka Serduchka (born 1973)
- Les Serdyuk (1940-2010)
- Stepan Shagaida (1896-1938)
- Taisiia-Oksana Shchuruk (born 1998)
- Tetiana Sheliha (born 1948)
- Oksana Shvets (born 1955)
- Konstantin Stepankov (born 1928)
- Bohdan Stupka (1941-2012)
- Hanna Sumska (1933-2022)
- Natalya Sumska (born 1956)
- Olha Sumska (born 1966)
- Vasyl Symchych (1915-1978)
- Yevhen Synelnykov (born 1981)
- Mila Syvatska (born 1998)
- Volodymyr Talashko (born 1946)
- Yuri Tavrov (1938-2010)
- Nico Turoff (1899-1978)

== U-Z ==
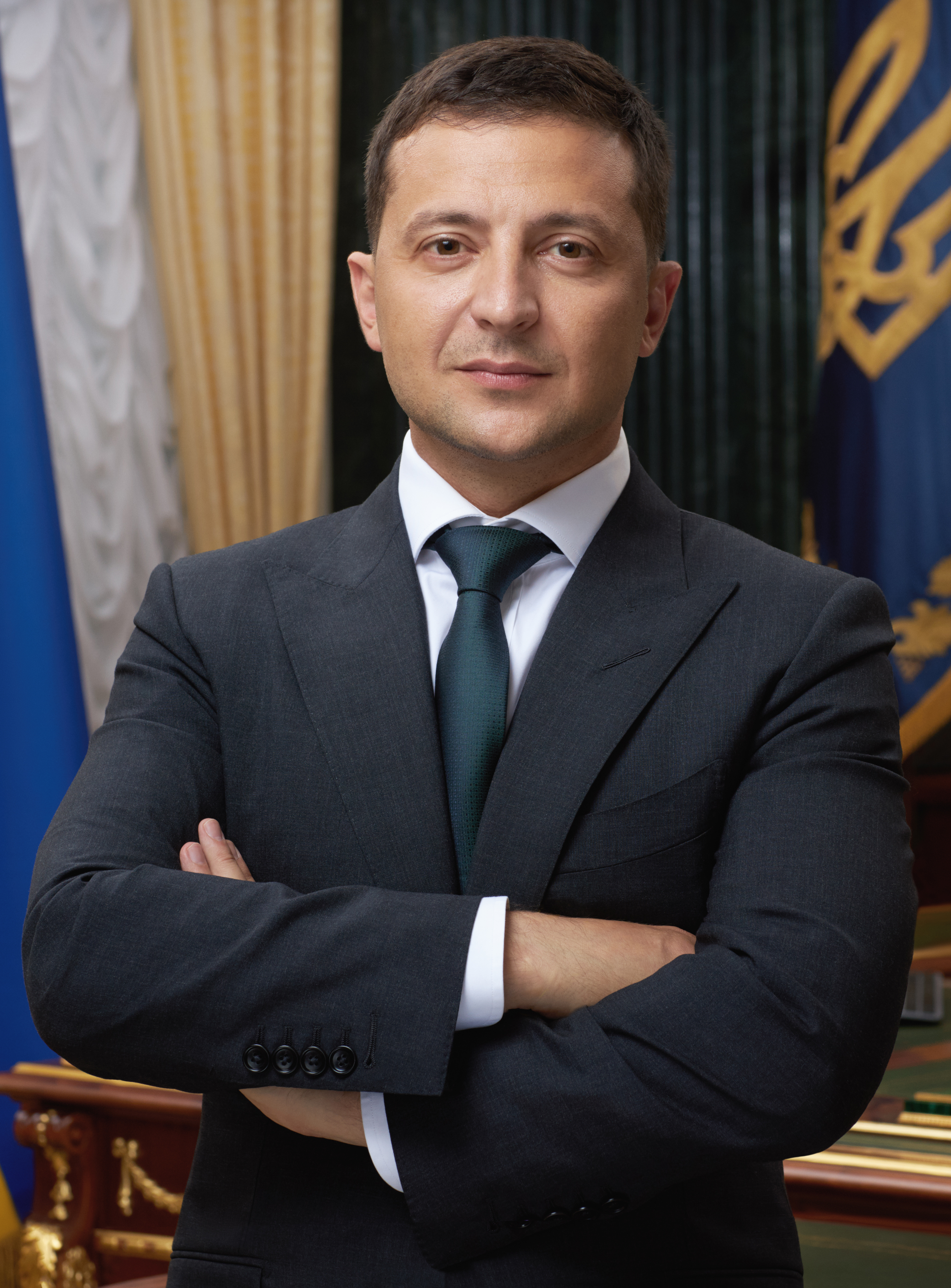
Volodymyr Zelenskyy

- Natalya Vasko (born 1972)
- Berta Vázquez (born 1992)
- Petro Vesklyarov (1911-1994)
- Aina Vilberh (born 1985)
- Irma Vitovska (born 1974)
- Ilia Volok (born 1964)
- Yuriy Volotovskyi (born 1982)
- Vyacheslav Voronin (1934-2016)
- Natasha Yarovenko (born 1979)
- Tamara Yatsenko (born 1955)
- Lyudmyla Yefymenko (born 1951)
- Olesia Vlasova (born 1974)
- Hnat Yura (1888-1966)
- Kamaliya Zahoor (born 1977)
- Svetlana Zelenkovskaya (born 1977)
- Volodymyr Zelenskyy (born 1978)
- Viktor Zhdanov (born 1968)
- Oksana Zhdanova (born 1993)
- Olesia Zhurakivska (born 1973)
- Rymma Zyubina (born 1971)
- Anastasia Zyurkalova (born 1991)
