= Vyacheslav Sumsky =

Ukrainian actor (1934–2007)

- В'ячеслав Сумський
- Born: 6 September 1934; Kirovohrad Oblast, Ukrainian SSR
- Died: 12 September 2007 (aged 73); Kyiv, Ukraine
- Resting place: Baikove Cemetery
- Education: Kyiv National I. K. Karpenko-Kary Theatre, Cinema and Television University
- Occupation: Actor
- Spouse: Hanna Opanasenko
- Children: Natalya Sumska; Olha Sumska
- Honours: People's Artist of the USSR (declined); People's Artist of the Ukrainian SSR

Vyacheslav Hnatovych Sumsky (Ukrainian: В'ячеслав Гнатович Сумський; 6 September 1934 – 12 September 2007) was a Ukrainian theater actor. He was a People's Artist of the Ukrainian SSR.

== Biography ==
Vyacheslav Hnatovych Sumsky was born on 6 September 1934 in the village of Verblyuzhka (now village of Pogrebnyakovo) in Kirovohrad Oblast. According to a neighbor of Sumsky's family, he dreamed of studying at a conservatoire. However, he would have to study for a year and pass exams. Instead of pursuing music, he turned to theater acting. He graduated from the Kyiv National I. K. Karpenko-Kary Theatre, Cinema and Television University in 1956.

From 1957 to 1967, Sumsky acted at the Maria Zankovetska Theatre. From 1967 to 1980, he was part of the Zaporizhzhya Musical and Drama Theatre. From 1980 to 1990, he was part of the Regional Musical-Dramatic Theatre Nikolai Gogol. From 1990 to 1993, he was part of the "Budmo!" theater in Kyiv. Since 1993, he was part of the Ivan Franko National Academic Drama Theater.

He died from cancer on 12 September 2007 in Kyiv. His funeral was held on September 15 at the Ivan Franko Theater. He is buried at the Baikove Cemetery. The area in Verblyuzhka which used to have a house where he and his family lived is now a local landmark.

Sumsky was married with Hanna Sumska. They lived with each other for 50 years. He had two daughters: Natalya and Olha.

Mykhailo Kramar, an actor who knew Sumsky, said that he painted frequently. He copied landscape paintings of Ivan Shishkin and painted the city of Poltava. Anatolii Khostikoiev, who is a husband of Sumsky's daughter Natalya, said that he was an avid fisherman.

Sumsky suffered from poor health. Kramar said that he was a heavy smoker. Sumsky's daughter Olha said that he suffered from alcohol addiction even up until his death. She said that he would become depressed when he was rejected for roles that he wanted to play.

During the 1970s, he was offered the title of People's Artist of the USSR, which he declined. His daughter Olha said that he was principled and she recalled him saying: "I refuse this title, because I am a People's Artist of Ukraine and that is enough for me." In 1981, he was named People's Artist of the Ukrainian SSR.
