= Heroes Never Die =

Heroes Never Die may refer to:

- Heroesneverdie.com, Polygon website for video game Overwatch
- Cyborgs: Heroes Never Die, 2017 Ukrainian war drama film

== See also ==
- A Hero Never Dies
