= Iryna Doroshenko =

Ukrainian actress (born 1957)

Iryna Evgenivna Doroshenko (Ukrainian: Ірина Євгенівна Дорошенко; born 19 July 1957) is a Ukrainian theater, film, and dubbing actress. People's Artist of Ukraine (1998).

== Early life and education ==
Iryna Evgenivna Doroshenko was born on 19 July 1957 in Kyiv. In 1978, she graduated from the film acting faculty of Kyiv National I. K. Karpenko-Kary Theatre, Cinema and Television University.

== Career ==
Since 1978, Doroshenko has been working at Ivan Franko National Academic Drama Theater. She was engaged in dubbing and voicing in Ukrainian and Russian languages. Doroshenko is famous for voicing Marge and Lisa Simpson in Ukrainian.

== Selected filmography ==
- Dnipro Wind (1976)
- The whole world in your eyes (1977)
- Relatives (1977)
- Fusion (1985)
- Your Father's House (1986)
- Storm Warning (1988)
- Black Panther and the Polar Bear (1990)
- People's Malachy (1991)
- Ivan and the Mare (1992)
- Moon Cuckoo (1993)
- Woodcocks (1995)
- Paradise Lost (2000)
- Trail of the Werewolf (2001)
- Lady Mayor (2003)
- The Mystery of St. Patrick (2006)
- Stepfather (2007)
- Gravity (2008)
- Good Reason to Kill (2009)
- House for Two (2009)
- Plato Angel (2010)
- Spring in December (2011)
- Rage (Movie 3) (2011)
- Five years and one day (2012)
- Clan of Jewelers (2015)
- On the Life Line (2016)
- Singer (2016)
- Window of Life (2016—2017)
- Paradise Place (2016—2017)
- Sniper (2017)
- Travelers (2019)
- Serf (2019)
- Zoya (2019)

== Selected dubbing and voicing in Ukrainian ==
- Pirates of the Caribbean: At World's End - Ms. Jin (dubbing, Nevafilm Ukraine)
- The Guardian - Maggie (dubbing, Nevafilm Ukraine)
- Meet the Robinsons - Mildred (dubbing, Nevafilm Ukraine)
- The Incredibles (2 parts) — Edna Mod (dubbing, Nevafilm Ukraine\Le Doyen)
- Cars (3 parts) — (dubbing, Nevafilm Ukraine\Le Doyen)
- Mulan - Grandma Fa (dub, Le Doyen)
- A Christmas Carol — (dubbed by Le Doyen)
- The Princess and the Frog — (dubbing, Le Doyen)
- The Lion King II: Simba's Pride — (dubbed by Le Doyen)
- Lilo & Stitch — (dubbing, Le Doyen)
- The SpongeBob Movie: Sponge Out of Water — (dubbed by Le Doyen)
- Paranormal Activity: The Marked Ones — (dubbed by Le Doyen)
- Moana - Grandmother Tala (dubbing, Le Doyen)
- Madagascar 3: Europe's Most Wanted - Dubois (dubbed by Le Doyen)
- Sleeping Beauty - Flora (dubbed by Le Doyen)
- Coco - Coco (dub, Le Doyen)
- Home on the Range - Pearl (dub, Le Doyen)
- Snow White and the Seven Dwarfs - The Evil Queen\The Witch (dubbed by Le Doyen)
- Pocahontas (2 parts) — Grandma Willow (dubbing, Le Doyen)
- Duck Tales (1987, 2017) — Magica von Chvaren (dubbing, Le Doyen)
- The Birth of a Nation - Bridget (dubbed by Le Doyen)
- The Aristocats - Madame (new dubbing, Le Doyen)
- Flushed Away — (dubbing, Pteroduction Sound)
- Percy Jackson: Sea of Monsters — (dubbing, Postmodern)
- Aquaman — (dubbing, Postmodern)
- Shrek (3-4 parts) — (dubbing, Postmodern)
- Ice Age (parts 4-5) — Babtsia (dubbing, Postmodern)
- The Simpsons Movie — Marge Simpson (dubbing, Postmodern\Central Production International Group)
- Phineas and Ferb - Betty Jo Flynn, Winifred Fletcher (dubbing, Le Doyen\Studio 1+1)
- Milo Murphy's Law — (dubbing, Studio 1+1)
- Ninjago — Edna Walker, Mistake (seasons 6-9) (dubbing, Studio 1+1)
- The Cleveland Show — (dubbing, Studio 1+1)
- İstanbullu Gelin — (dubbing, Studio 1+1)
- Intouchables — (dubbing, Studio 1+1)
- Peppa Pig — Granny Pig (dubbing, Studio 1+1)
- My Little Pony: Friendship Is Magic (seasons 5-9) — (dubbing, Studio 1+1)
- SpongeBob SquarePants — (dubbing, Studio 1+1)
- Enchanted — (new dubbing, Studio 1+1)
- The Reader — (multi-voice voice-over, Studio 1+1)
- You Don't Mess with the Zohan — (multi-voice voice-over, Studio 1+1)
- Precious — (multi-voice voiceover, Studio 1+1)
- Lourdes — (multi-voice voice-over, Studio 1+1)
- Maximum Risk — (multi-voice voice-over, K1)
- Potoo — (multi-voice voiceover, Tak Treba Productions commissioned by NTN)

== Selected dubbing and voicing in Russian ==
- Viy — (Russian dubbing, Le Doyen\Cinelab SoundMix)
- Knock — (Russian dubbing, Tretyakoff Production)
- School — (Russian dubbing, Studio 1+1)

== Awards and honors ==
- People's Artist of Ukraine (1998)
- Order of Merit III degree (2008)
- Winner of the All-Ukrainian Award "Woman of the 3rd Millennium" in the "Rating" nomination (2009)
- Order of Princess Olga III degree (2018)
