= Viktoria Posmitna =

Ukrainian athlete (born 1966)

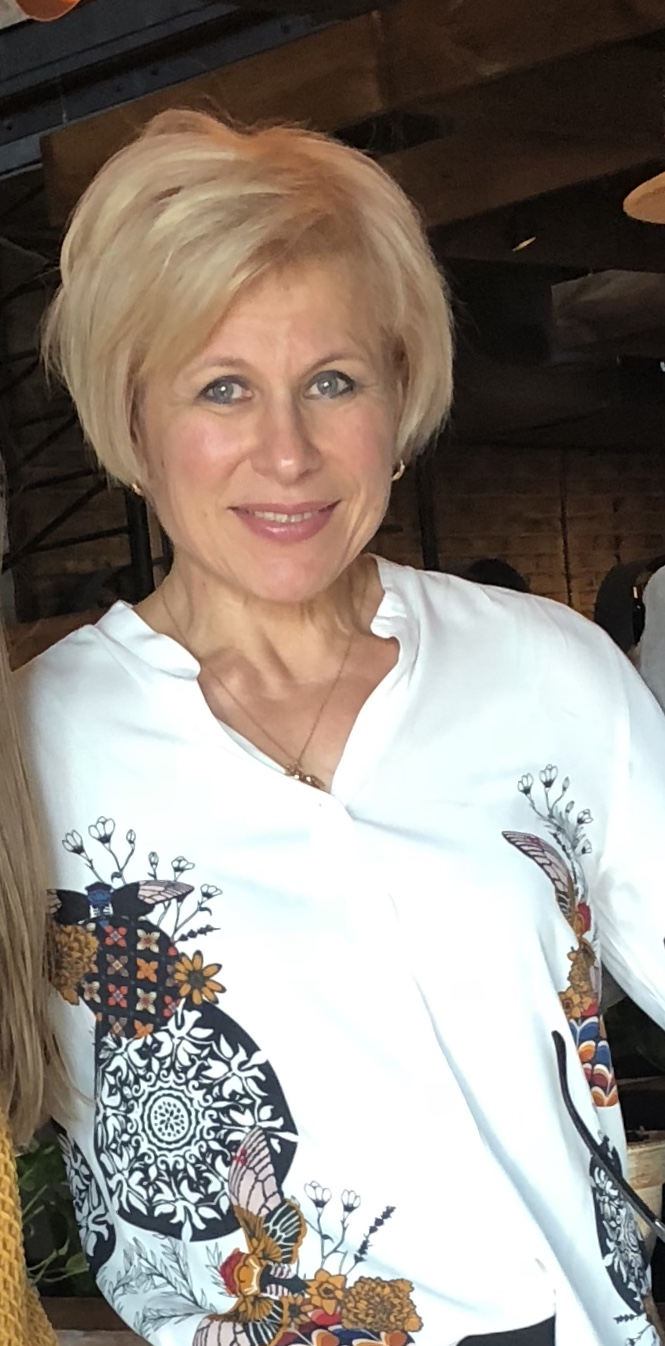

Personal information
- Full name: Posmitna Viktoria Vasylivna
- Born: 7 April 1966 (age 60) Kyiv, Ukrainian SSR, USSR

Sport
- Sport: powerlifting, bodybuilding, fitness

Viktoria Vasylivna Posmitna (Larsson) (Ukrainian: Вікторія Василівна Посмітна (Ларссон); born 7 April 1966 in Kyiv, Ukrainian SSR) – Ukrainian athlete (powerlifting, bodybuilding, fitness), coach, TV host. Honored Master of Sports of Ukraine, Master of Sports of Ukraine of international class, twelve-time champion of Ukraine, multiple winner of the European and World Championships.

== Career ==
Viktoria began her career in 1985, at the age of 19, when she became interested in judo. While studying at the Taras Shevchenko National University of Kyiv, she becomes the champion of the university in judo, football, volleyball and table tennis, a member of the city judo team.

In parallel with judo, since 1994, Viktoria begins to professionally engage in powerlifting. She becomes a multiple winner of the World, Europe, Ukraine and Sweden Championships in powerlifting for the period 1996-2004, 2010, according to International Powerlifting Federation (IPF).

Since 2002, the athlete has been keen on bodybuilding and fitness. Due to this, Viktoria becomes bodybuilding champion of Ukraine, International Federation of BodyBuilding and Fitness (IFBB), in 2003, bodyfitness, World Fitness Federation / World BodyBuilding Federation (WFF/WBBF), in 2005 and Bodyfitness World champion, in the age category 30+, WFF/WBBF, in the same year. In 2007, she became president of the WFF/WBBF Ukraine Fitness Federation. Since 2008, Viktoria has been living and working in Sweden.

== Sporting performance ==
- 1996 - European Powerlifting Championships. 2nd place
- 1997 - Ukrainian Powerlifting Cup. 1st place
- 1998 - Ukrainian Powerlifting Championship. 1st place
- 1998 - Women's World Powerlifting Championships. 3rd place, IPF
- 1998 - European Women's Powerlifting Championships. 2nd place, IPF
- 1999 - Ukrainian Powerlifting Championship. 1st place
- 1999 - European Women's Powerlifting Championships. 2nd place, IPF
- 2000 - Ukrainian Powerlifting Championship. 1st place.
- 2000 - IPF Women's World Powerlifting Championships. 3rd place.
- 2001 - Ukrainian Powerlifting Championship. 1st place
- 2001 - Women's World Powerlifting Championships. 2nd place, IPF
- 2001 - Championship of Ukraine on bench press. 1st place
- 2001 - European Women's Powerlifting Championships. 4 gold medals, IPF
- 2001 - Participant in "Strongwoman" Euro Tournament
- 2002 - World Powerlifting Championship. 1 gold, 1 silver medals, IPF
- 2003 - Bodybuilding Champion of Ukraine, IFBB
- 2003 - Ukrainian Powerlifting Championship. 1st place
- 2005 - Champion of Ukraine in bodifitness, WFF/WBBF
- 2005 - World Champion in the category of body fitness 30+ years old, WFF/WBBF
- 2010 - Swedish Powerlifting Championship. 1st place, IPF

=== Top scores ===
Powerlifting in the weight category up to 82.5 kg:

- Squats: 245.5 kg
- Bench press: 137.5 kg
- Deadlift: 227.5 kg
- Total: 607.5 kg

== Coaching activity ==
Viktoria Posmitna has been involved in coaching since 1992. She has trained a number of outstanding athletes in judo, powerlifting and body fitness.

One of Viktoria's trainee is Iryna Kolesnyk. The athlete is engaged in sambo, judo and freestyle wrestling. Iryna is the winner of the World Youth Championship (2002), the silver prize winner of the World (2003) and Europe (2004) Championships.

From 2000 to 2007, Viktoria was a trainer in Kyiv at the “Arsenal“ gym. She trained both professional athletes and amateurs of various age categories. Her trainees were: Andrii Kovalskyi, the presenter of the program “Fakty. Sport“, ICTV channel, Vоlоdymyr Mzhelskyi, editor-in-chief of 5th Channel, Mykhailo Malyi, “Fakty”, ICTV channel, Dmytro Mukharskyi, actor, Antin Mukharskyi’s father, Yuri Volotovsky, actor, powerlifter. It was at the time when Viktoria began to flourish as a sportswoman.

During the period of coaching at “Arsenal”, Ukrainian television filmed many reportages about Viktoria. Soon the athlete herself became a TV host.

After moving to Sweden in 2008, Viktoria became manager-trainer at the AlbaNova Gym sports club for the staff of the AlbaNova University Centre in Stockholm.

== Personal life ==
Viktoria has two sons - Andrii born in 1984 and Vasyl born in 1990.

== Interesting Facts ==
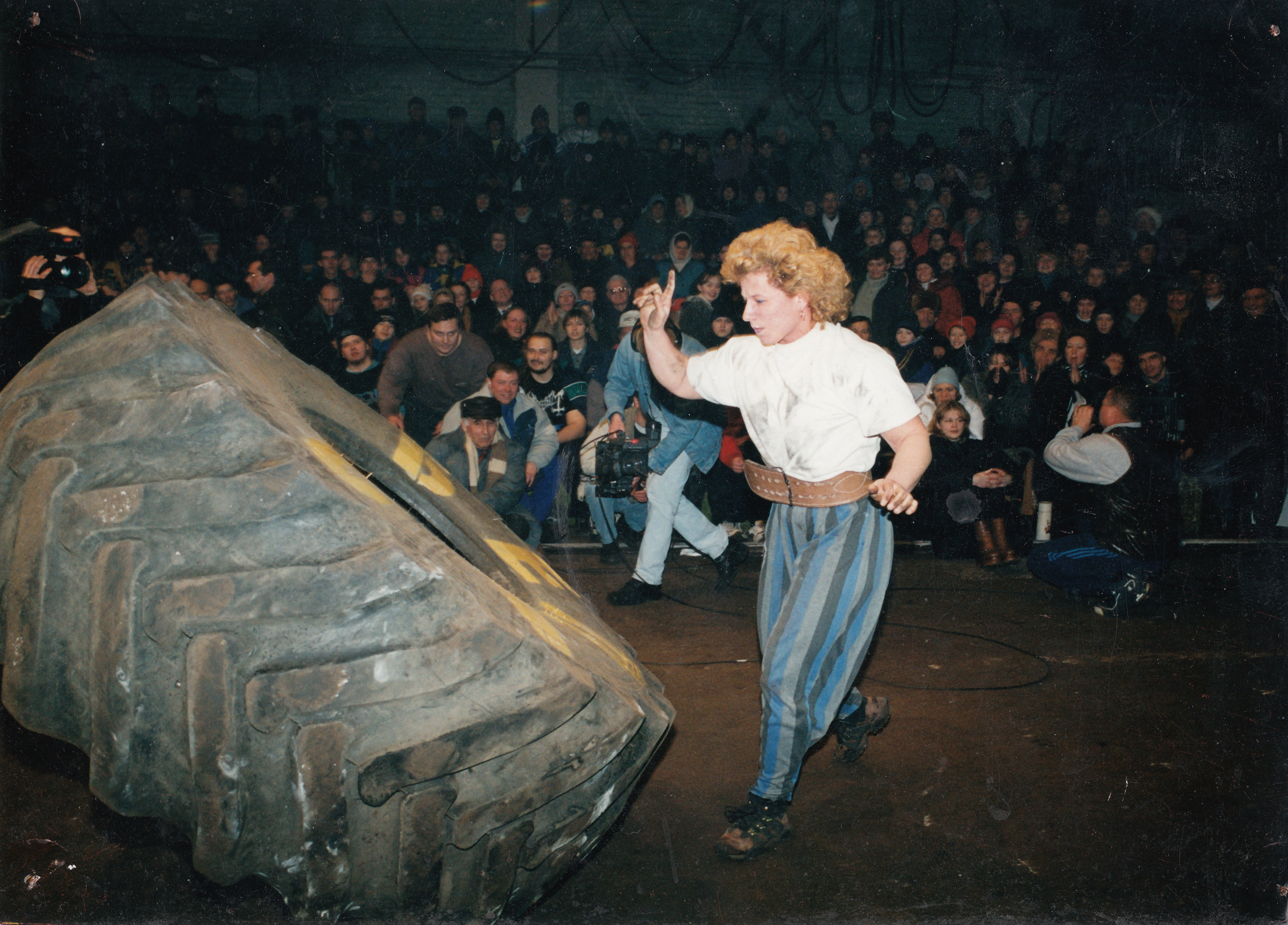
Viktoria Posmitna in the Strongman tournament "Bohatyrski Rozvagy", February 5, 2000

Viktoria studied in physics and mathematics senior highschool №145 in Kyiv under her maiden name Krysina, 1980-1983.

In 2000, for the first time in Ukraine, on a par with men, Viktoria takes part in the Strongman tournament "Bohatyrski Rozvagy". She was the only woman in this tournament. In these competitions, Viktoria won the title "The strongest woman in Ukraine". The athlete has performed a dump truck wheel flip three times in 26 seconds. Wheel weight was 340 kg.

For one year, she performed at the highest professional level in three sports: the World Powerlifting Championship, 2002; European Bodybuilding Championships, 2003; European Championship Strongwoman, 2003.

The athlete was disallowed her squat record. This happened in 2002 at the World Powerlifting Championship in Rees Germany. The weight on the barbell was 252.5 kg. While athlete getting up with a barbell, the assistant who was backing up from the left side touched the discs for a split second. Officially, the judges reported that there was a double movement. This means that while the athlete getting up the bar went down, and then went up again. In fact, with a record weight it is almost impossible to do. The athlete got up with a weight of 252.5 kg, but it was not counted.

Viktoria's oldest son, Andrii Posmitnyi, at the age of 17 at the Championship of Ukraine in powerlifting among juniors in 2001 in total collected 682.5 kg: squats: 270 kg, bench press: 162.5 kg, deadlift: 250 kg.

She starred in the music video of the Ukrainian rock band Okean Elzy “Vidchuvayu” (2006; dir. Illia Chichkan).

About the achievements of the athlete was shot a documentary “Viva Viktoria!”.

Viktoria has set 27 Ukrainian records.

== Education ==
- Taras Shevchenko National University of Kyiv, geophysicist engineer.
- National University of Physical Education and Sport of Ukraine, Master.
- Higher Sports School, Swedish: GIH (Gymnastik - och idrottshögskolan), Stockholm, Sweden. Specialization - research areas in strength training, Master. Thesis: Electromyography biofeedback in strength training: effects of five weeks training on muscle activation and strength.
