= Kyiv Natural Science Lyceum No. 145 =

Natural Science Lyceum 145
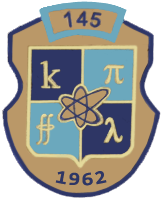

Location
- 46 Shota Rustaveli Street; Pechersk Raion, Kyiv, 01033; Ukraine
- Coordinates: 50°26′4″N 30°31′3″E

Information
- Type: Comprehensive school, Lyceum, Public, Specialized school
- Established: September 1, 1962
- Principal: Levtyk Mykola Mykolayovych
- Grades: 7–11
- Website: www.lic145.kiev.ua

The 145th Natural Science Lyceum, officially known as Kyiv Natural-Scientific Lyceum No. 145 (Ukrainian: Київський природничо-науковий ліцей № 145), is a secondary educational institution, located in Pechersk District of Kyiv, Ukraine. The program of study emphasizes Physics, Mathematics, Computer Science and Chemistry.

== History ==
In 1962, as a result of the joint initiative of the University of Kyiv and the City Council, the school was founded as the Specialized School № 145 (Physics & Math specialization). The school was envisioned as an elite institution, in particular the admission was always highly selective. Over the years, it has produced over 3,000 graduates, 80% of whom subsequently received advanced degrees.

The school curriculum was vetted by the Academy of Sciences of Ukraine, and as such it was one of the first schools in Ukraine that has received the Lyceum status. In the early 1990s a considerable number of teachers of the Lyceum left (mostly for positions outside of the country), but the process was reversed later in the decade.

== Education ==
Grades 7 to 11 programs are offered. The curriculum places special emphasis on Mathematics and natural sciences, as well as Computer Science. Programs in Mathematics and Physics were developed for the Lyceum in cooperation with the faculty of the Kyiv National University. There is also the Junior Academy of Science Section, which coordinates the research activities of the students. The students of the Lyceum can use some of the research facilities of the NASU. Several subject Olympiads are organized, with the winners proceeding to the nationwide and international level contests.

== Teaching staff ==
The director of the Lyceum – Mykola Levtyk, Honored Worker of Education.

The teaching staff includes three distinguished teachers of Ukraine, 6 teachers, supervisors, 16 senior teachers, 40 teachers of the highest category, 8 Soros Fellows, six Ph.D's in physics and mathematics sciences, and Sc.D's. Lectures and courses are also taught by the university professors and members of the research staff of the NASU.

== Students ==
During the 1992–2014 year of lycée pupils were:

• 183 winners of international Olympiads in physics, mathematics, chemistry, computer science

• 92 winners of the international scientific-practical conferences on physics, chemistry, geography

• 505 winner of All-Ukrainian Olympiads in physics, mathematics, computer science, chemistry, biology, geography

• 17 winners and 25 winners of competition of the Soros Foundation (1994-2000)

Kyiv Natural Science High School is regularly ranked among the leading educational institutions of the results of national testing. In 2009, the High School took second place in Kyiv in mathematics, in 2010 - the first, and in 2011 the total third place in the test in all subjects.

== Notable alumni ==
- Pavel Etingof (Mathematician, Fellow of the American Academy of Arts and Sciences)
- Pavlo Klimkin (Politician, Minister of Foreign Affairs of Ukraine 2014-2019)
- Sergey Guriev (Economist, the Dean of London Business School 2024-today)
- Igor L. Markov (Computer Scientist, Fellow of IEEE)
- Victoria Posmitna (Larsson), World and European Powerlifiting Champion
- Maryna Viazovska (Ukrainian Mathematician who solved the sphere-packing problem in dimensions 8 and 24, awarded 2022 Fields Medal)

== See also ==
Kyiv Secondary School No. 189

Ukrainian Physics and Mathematics Lyceum
