= Sergiy Romaniuk =

Soviet actor (1953–2019)

Sergiy Dmytrovych Romaniu
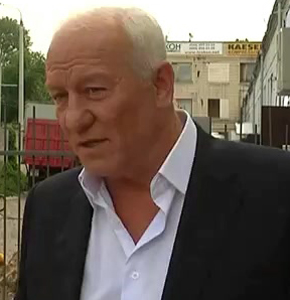
- Born: July 21, 1953; Kryvyi Rih, Dnipropetrovsk Region, Ukrainian SSR, USSR
- Died: March 3, 2019 (age 65); Ivano-Frankivsk, Ukraine
- Citizenship: Ukraine
- Occupations: film actor, theater actor, TV actor
- Years active: 1972—2019
- Awards: People's Artist of Ukraine

Sergiy Dmytrovych Romaniuk (July 21, 1953, Kryvyi Rih – March 3, 2019, Ivano-Frankivsk) was a Ukrainian theater and film actor. He was a member of the Ukrainian Association of Cinematographers and was awarded the title of People's Artist of Ukraine in 1998.

== Biography ==
Sergiy Dmytrovych Romaniuk was born on July 21, 1953, in the Ukrainian city of Kryvyi Rih in Dnipropetrovsk Oblast. He spent his childhood in Novohrad-Volynskyi in Zhytomyr Oblast, where his parents relocated in 1961. In 1973, he graduated from the Studio of the Ivan Franko National Ukrainian Drama Theatre. From 1972, he was an actor at the Ivan Franko Academic Regional Music and Drama Theatre in Ivano-Frankivsk.

He died on March 3, 2019, in Ivano-Frankivsk at the age of 66.

On December 28, 2019, a memorial plaque dedicated to Sergiy Romaniuk was unveiled on the building located at 3 Vahylevycha Street in Ivano-Frankivsk, where the actor had lived in his final years.

The actor appeared in over 100 feature films and short films.

Music videos:

2004 – Music video for the song "Biologiya" by the music group "VIA Gra".

== Roles in the theater ==
In 2018, he played the role of Pierre-Auguste Renoir in "Modigliani" based on the screenplay of the 2004 film of the same name by Mick Davis. Directed by Rostyslav Derzhipilsky.
