= The Line (2017 film) =

2017 film

- Film poster
- Directed by: Peter Bebjak
- Written by: Peter Balko
- Produced by: Wanda Adamík Hrycová; Andriy Yermak
- Starring: Stanislav Boklan
- Cinematography: Martin Žiaran
- Edited by: Marek Kralovsky
- Music by: Slavomír Solovic
- Distributed by: Film Republic (world); Continental Film (Slovakia); UFD (Ukraine)
- Release dates: 3 July 2017 (Slovakia); 16 November 2017 (Ukraine)
- Running time: 108 minutes
- Countries: Slovakia; Ukraine
- Languages: Slovak; Ukrainian
- Budget: 1.31 million €
- Box office: $2.1 million

The Line (Slovak: Čiara, Ukrainian: Межа, romanized: Mezha) is a 2017 Slovak-Ukrainian crime thriller film written and directed by Peter Bebjak.

== Plot ==
On the Slovakia–Ukraine border, shortly before Slovakia joins the Schengen Area, criminal smugglers sneak contraband into the European Union.

== Cast ==
- Tomáš Maštalír as Adam Krajňák
- Stanislav Boklan as Krull
- Zuzana Fialová as Saša Krajňáková
- Benkö Géza as Taras
- Andrej Hryc as Peter Bernard
- Filip Kankovský as Viktor
- Emília Vášáryová as Anna Krajňáková
- Oleksandr Piskunov as Ivor

== Awards and nominations ==
On 3 July 2017, The Line was released in Slovakia, as well as at the 52nd Karlovy Vary International Film Festival, where it was nominated for the Crystal Globe and won the Best Director Award for Bebjak. The film was also selected as the Slovak entry for the Best Foreign Language Film at the 90th Academy Awards, but it was not nominated.

== See also ==
- List of submissions to the 90th Academy Awards for Best Foreign Language Film
- List of Slovak submissions for the Academy Award for Best Foreign Language Film
