= Hanna Sumska =

Ukrainian actress

- Ганна Сумська́
- Born: Hanna Ivanivna Opanasenko; 15 October 1933; Kyiv Oblast, Ukrainian SSR
- Died: 27 February 2022 (aged 88); Kyiv, Ukraine
- Education: Kyiv Theater Institute
- Occupation: Actress
- Spouse: Vyacheslav Sumsky
- Children: Natalya Sumska; Olha Sumska
- Honours: Merited Artist of the Ukrainian SSR

Hanna Ivanivna Sumska (Ukrainian: Ганна Іванівна Сумська́; née Opanasenko (Опана́сенко); 15 October 1933 – 27 February 2022) was a Ukrainian stage actress. She was a Merited Artist of the Ukrainian SSR.

== Biography ==
Hanna Ivanivna Opanasenko was born on 15 October 1933 in the village of Katyuzhanka in Vyshhorod Raion, Kyiv Oblast. She graduated from the Kyiv Theater Institute in 1955. From 1955 to 1957, she was part of the Crimean Theater. From 1957 to 1967, she was part of the Maria Zankovetska Theatre. From 1967 to 1980, she was part of the Zaporizhzhya Musical and Drama Theatre. From 1980 to 1990, she was part of the Regional Musical-Dramatic Theatre Nikolai Gogol. From 1990 to 1993, she was part of the Kyiv "Budmo" Theater. Since 1993, she worked for the National Ukrainian Drama Theater. She played over 150 roles. Sumska died on 27 February 2022 at 4 am in Kyiv. Her daughter Olha announced her death and wrote on social media: "Trouble does not come alone... ", referring to the fact that her death occurred during the first few days of the Russian invasion of Ukraine.

Sumska was married to actor Vyacheslav Sumsky. She lived with him for 50 years. She was the mother of Natalya and Olha Sumska. She had four grandchildren: Darina, Antonina, Vyacheslav and Anna.

In 1975, Sumska was named Merited Artist of the Ukrainian SSR. In 2006, she earned the All-Ukrainian Prize "Woman of the Third Millenium" in the Significant Figure nomination.
