= Natalya Sumska =

Ukrainian actress and television host

- Born: Наталя Сумська; April 22, 1956 (age 70); Kyiv Oblast, Ukrainian SSR
- Education: Kyiv National I. K. Karpenko-Kary Theatre, Cinema and Television University
- Children: 2
- Parents: Vyacheslav Sumsky (father); Hanna Sumska (mother)
- Relatives: Olha Sumska (sister)
- Awards: People's Artist of Ukraine (2000); Shevchenko National Prize (2008)

Natalya Vyacheslavivna Sumska (Ukrainian: Наталя В'ячеславівна Сумська; born April 22, 1956) is a Ukrainian theater and film actress and television hostess. She is a recipient of the People's Artist of Ukraine title and the Shevchenko National Prize in 2000 and 2008 respectively.

== Biography ==
Sumska was born on April 22, 1956, in the village of Katyuzhanka, Kyiv Oblast. Her father Vyacheslav Sumsky and Hanna Opanasenko-Sumska were both theater actors at the Ivan Franko National Academic Drama Theater who held the titles People's Artist of Ukraine and Merited Artist of Ukraine respectively. She lived in Lviv until the age of 10. She had her first acting role at the age of 6 for a rehearsal of the play Nevilnyk (Ukrainian: Невільник) at the Maria Zankovetska Theatre. She graduated from the Kyiv National I. K. Karpenko-Kary Theatre, Cinema and Television University in 1977. Since 1977, she has been an actress at the Ivan Franko National Academic Drama Theater.

In 2000 she became a laureate of the national theater award "Kyiv pectoral" (for her role of Masha in the Chekhov's Three sisters).

Since 2003 simultaneously works for Inter TV Networks. There she led a talk-show Key moment which was discontinued by Inter in 2010.

In 2008, Sumska received Shevchenko National Prize and was named the Kyivan of the Year.

Works in the theater company "Benyuk and Hostikoyev".

He is a member of the Taras Shevchenko National Prize Committee of Ukraine (since December 2016).

=== Personal life ===
Natalya Sumska has a younger sister named Olha, who is also an actress. She has a daughter named Daryna Mamai-Sumska from her first marriage to cameraman Igor Mamai. She has a son named Viacheslav Khostikoyev.

Natalya Sumska is married to theater actor Anatolii Khostikoiiev with whom she acts on stage.

== Credits ==
=== Plays ===
- Eneyida (Kotliarevsky) as Didona
- Vassa Zhelieznova (Gorky) as Liudmila
- White Crow (Rybchynsky) as Joan D'Arc
- Blez (Manye) as Mari
- Senior from higher world as Fiorella and Matilda
- Kin IV as Anna
- Pygmalion as Eliza Doolittle

=== Movies ===
- Karmeliuk as Maria
- Natalka Poltavka as Natalka
- The Mountains are Smoking as Marichka
- For home fire as Yulia Shablynska
- Dudaryks as Khrystyna
- State Border as Maria

== Awards and honors ==
In 2000, Sumska earned the title of People's Artist of Ukraine. In 2008, she earned the Shevchenko National Prize for her role in the play Of Mice and Men. She earned a total of three Kyiv Pectoral awards from the years 2000, 2011 and 2015. She earned the 2011 Kyiv Pectoral award for Best Actress for her role in the play Zorda the Greek. In 2020, she earned a Golden Dzyga award for Best Supporting Actress for her role as fortune-teller Yavdokha in the play Chornyi Voron (Ukrainian: Чорний ворон). In 2016 and 2020, she earned the Order of Merit of the third and second class respectively.
