= Andriy Isayenko =

Ukrainian actor (born 1986)

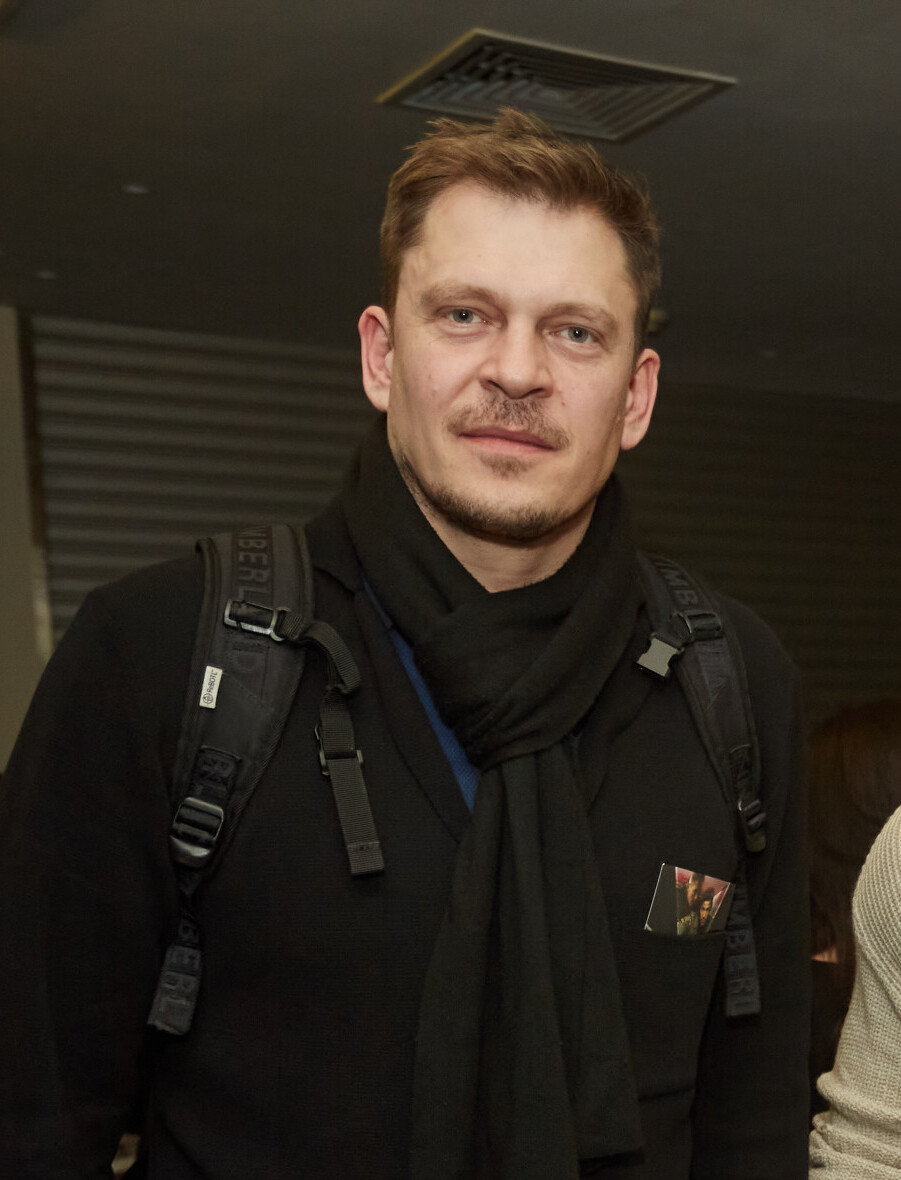
- Andriy Iaienko in 2023
- Born: Andriy Mykolayovych Isayenko; 22 July 1986 (age 40); Zaporizhzhia, Ukrainian SSR
- Occupation: Actor
- Years active: 2008–present
- Spouse: Olesia Morhunets-Isayenko
- Children: 1
- Awards: Shevchenko National Prize (2022); Merited Artist of Ukraine (2021)

Andriy Mykolayovych Isayenko (born 22 July 1986) is a Ukrainian theater and film actor. He was designated a Merited Artist of Ukraine in 2021 and received the Shevchenko National Prize in 2022. He is best known for his role as "Subota" in the war drama Cyborgs (2017).

== Early life and education ==
Andriy Isayenko was born on 22 July 1986 in Zaporizhzhia. During his school years, he was active in sports. He also competed in KVN (humor competitions), winning a national school cup in Odesa.

In 2008, he graduated from the Faculty of Theater Arts at Zaporizhzhia National University, studying under Gennady Fortus. That same year, he joined the ensemble of the Kyiv Academic Theatre of Drama and Comedy on the left bank of Dnieper.

== Career ==
Isayenko has been involved in the Kyiv theater scene for over 15 years. Since 2021, he has also collaborated with the independent Wild Theatre in Kyiv.

His film career includes roles in Ukrainian and international co-productions. He was praised for his role in the 2017 film Cyborgs: Heroes Never Die, portraying a soldier defending the Donetsk International Airport. In 2023, he took on the lead role of Dr. Mykhailo Honchar in the medical drama series Female Doctor: New Life.

== Selected filmography ==
Year	Title	Role	Notes
2015	Hetman	Ivan Bohun	Historical film
2017	Cyborgs	"Subota"	
2017	Tales of Money	Levko	
2019	The Rising Hawk	Petro	Historical action
2020	Cossacks. A Absolutely False Story	Nazar	TV series
2021	I Work at the Cemetery	Valera	Drama/Comedy
2021	Carol of the Bells	NKVD officer	
2022	Lucky Girl	Yevhen Drahomanov	
2022	Me and Felix	Father Oleksiy	
2023	Female Doctor: New Life	Mykhailo Honchar	Lead role (TV series)
2024	Slovo House: Unfinished Novel	Mike Johansen	

== Awards and honors ==
- Merited Artist of Ukraine (2021): Awarded for his significant contribution to Ukrainian culture and state-building on the 30th anniversary of Ukraine's independence.
- Shevchenko National Prize (2022): Awarded for the production of "Bad Roads" at the Kyiv Academic Theatre of Drama and Comedy.

== Personal life ==
Isayenko is married to Ukrainian film director Olesia Morhunets-Isayenko. They have a daughter, Maria, who appeared alongside her father in the series Female Doctor: New Life. In 2024, Isayenko reported that his home was damaged by a Russian drone strike during the Russian invasion of Ukraine.
