= Mykhailo Zakharevych =

Ukrainian actor

- Михайло Захаревич
- Education: Kharkiv State Institute of Arts named after I. P. Kotliarevsky
- Occupations: Theatre figure, actor, general director, artistic director
- Known for: Artistic direction at the Ivan Franko National Academic Drama Theater, All-Union Institute for Advanced Training of Cultural Workers
- Awards: Honorary Diploma of the Cabinet of Ministers of Ukraine, People's Artist of Ukraine,

Mykhailo Vasylovych Zakharevych (Ukrainian: Михайло Васильович Захаревич; born September 26, 1950, Sosonka, Vinnytsia Oblast, Ukrainian SSR, USSR) — Soviet and Ukrainian theatre figure, actor. General Director and Artistic Director of the Ivan Franko National Academic Drama Theater. People's Artist of Ukraine (2004), Corresponding Member of the National Academy of Arts of Ukraine (2017).

== Biography ==
Born on September 26, 1950, in the village of Sosonka (now Vinnytsia Raion, Vinnytsia Oblast, Ukraine).

In 1972, he graduated from the Kharkiv State Institute of Arts named after I. P. Kotliarevsky, and in 1989, he completed the All-Union Institute for Advanced Training of Cultural Workers, specialising in management.

== Theater career ==
He began his professional career in 1967 at the Vinnytsia Regional Puppet Theater, where he worked until 1968. From 1972 to 1981, he was an actor at the Zaporizhzhia Music and Drama Theater named after Mykola Shchors.

Over the years, he held various management positions in Ukrainian theatre institutions:

- 1981–1983 — Deputy Director of the Zaporizhzhia Regional Puppet Theater
- 1983–1984 — Director of the Zaporizhzhia Regional Puppet Theater
- 1984–1992 — Director of the Zaporizhzhia Music and Drama Theater named after Mykola Shchors
- 1992–1994 — Director of the Kyiv Academic Ukrainian Drama Theater named after Ivan Franko

Since 1994, he has served as the General Director of the Ivan Franko National Academic Drama Theater, and since 2018, he has also held the position of General Director and Artistic Director.

== Academic and administrative work ==
From 1996 to 2000, he served as the First Deputy Minister of Culture and Arts of Ukraine. In 2016, he defended his dissertation on the topic "The Ivan Franko National Academic Drama Theater in the Dynamics of Sociocultural Transformations (1920–2001)", earning a PhD. Professor at the Kyiv National University of Theater, Film, and Television named after I. Karpenko-Karyi. Author of numerous scientific articles on theatre history and management.

From February 1 to April 9, 2021, he was the Head of the Ukrainian Cultural Foundation.

== Theater roles ==
- Zbyshek – The Morality of Mrs. Dulska by Gabriela Zapolska
- Malakhov – Stop Malakhov by Hryhoriy Agranov
- Lucindo – The Cunning Lover by Lope de Vega
- Valerik – The Third Pathetic by Mykola Pogodin

== Awards and honors ==
- 1989 – Honored Worker of Culture of Ukraine
- 1999 — Honored Artist of Ukraine
- 2000 – Certificate of Honor of the Cabinet of Ministers of Ukraine
- 2004 — People's Artist of Ukraine
- 2010 — Order of Prince Yaroslav the Wise (5th Class)
- 2015 — Order of Prince Yaroslav the Wise (4th Class)
- 2021 — Laureate of the Mykola Sadovsky Prize.
