= Olha Sumska =

Ukrainian actress

- Ольга В'ячеславівна Сумська
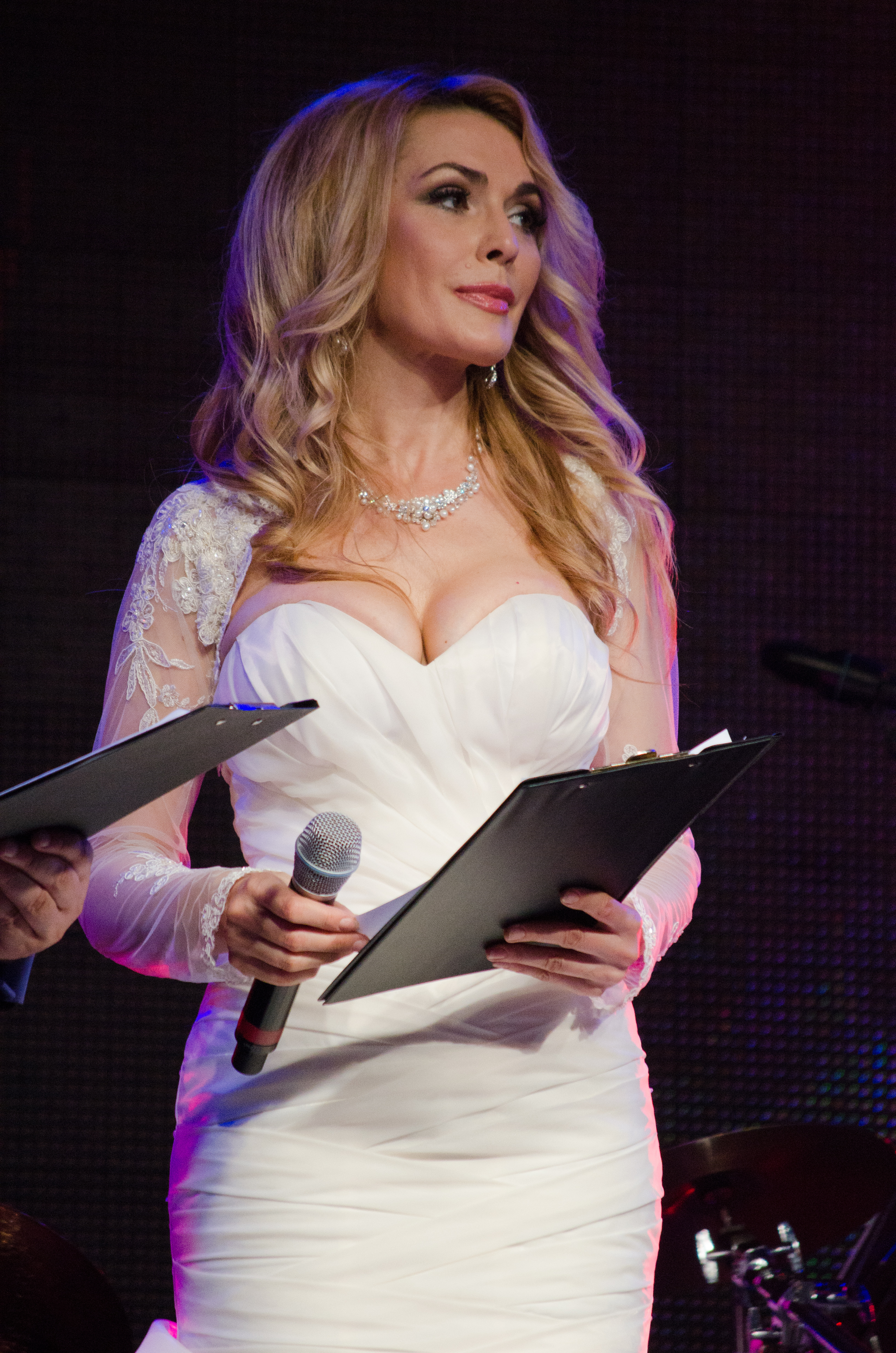
- Born: 22 August 1966 (age 60); Lviv, Ukrainian SSR
- Education: Kyiv Institute of Theatrical Arts
- Occupations: Actress, politician
- Parents: Vyacheslav Sumsky (father); Hanna Sumska (mother)
- Relatives: Nataliya Sumska (sister)
- Awards: Shevchenko National Prize (1996); People's Artist of Ukraine (2009)

Olha Sumska (Ukrainian: Ольга В'ячеславівна Сумська, born 22 August 1966) is a Ukrainian actress in theater and cinema and television hostess, who received the Shevchenko National Prize in 1996 and the People's Artist of Ukraine title in 2009. In 2006 she attempted to run for mayor of Kyiv.

== Biography ==
Olha was born in the city of Lviv in a family of actors. She has an older sister Nataliya Sumska who is also an actress. In 1987 Olha graduated the Kyiv Institute of Theatrical Arts and between 1988 and 2006 she was a stage actress of the Lesya Ukrainka National Academic Theater of Russian Drama. From 1988 to 2005, she worked as an actress at the Kyiv Lesya Ukrainka Russian Drama Theatre.

Sumska achieved great popularity with her role of Roxolana in the eponymous television series, which premiered in 1997.

In 2017, she served as a jury member for the League of Laughter.

== Personal life ==
Olha Sumska's first husband was actor Yevhen Papernyi. Their marriage ended in 1990. From her marriage to Papernyi, Olha Sumska has a daughter named Antonina (born 1 June 1990), who married Russian actor Volodymyr Yaglych. With her current husband, actor Vitaliy Borysiuk, the actress is raising a daughter named Hanna (born 2 March 2002).

== Filmography ==
=== Film ===
Year	Title	Country	Role	Notes	References
1983	Evenings on a Farm Near Dikanka	USSR	Muse, Sotnykivna, Pannochka		
1985	By the Call of the Heart	USSR	Kateryna		
1987	And Memory Will Echo in Sounds...	USSR	Nastya		
1987	Straw Bells	USSR	Halya		
1988	Theatre Season	USSR	Vera Trubnikova		
1991	Carpathian Gold	USSR	Oksana Sturko		
1991	People's Malakhii	USSR			
1992	Voice of Grass	Ukraine	Lyalya		
1992	Kyiv Petitioners	Ukraine			
1992	Macaroni of Death or the Mistake of Professor Buggenberg	Ukraine	Marquise de Sade	Unfinished short film	
1992	Four Sheets of Plywood	Ukraine	Sofiya		
1994	A Few Love Stories	Ukraine	Beatrice		
1994	Tiger Trappers	Ukraine	Natalka	Based on a novel by Ivan Bahrianyi	
1995	Sheet Music on a Gravestone	Ukraine			
1998	Princess on Beans	Ukraine, Russia	Lara		
2002	I, Doll	Russia	Gerda		
2004	Mourner or a New Year Detective	Ukraine, Russia			
2006	Bohdan-Zynovii Khmelnytskyi	Ukraine			
2006	The Secret of "Saint Patrick"	Ukraine	Nataliya Karyakina		
2008	Buying a Friend	Ukraine	Lilya		
2009	Return of the Prodigal Father	Russia			
2009	The Return of the Musketeers, or The Treasures of Cardinal Mazarin	Russia	Blanche		
2009	Gogol. The Closest	Russia			
2010	PorNO	Ukraine, Russia	Stepmother		
2012	Mom, I'm in Love with a Pilot	Ukraine	Lyubov Zhurba		
2013	Ivan the Powerful	Ukraine	Adeliya		
2013	Unforgotten Shadows	Ukraine	Valanchik's mother		
2015	Now I will Love You	Ukraine, Georgia	Tetyana		
2018	Me. You. He. She	Ukraine	Neighbour		
2021	The Last Darling Bulgaria	Russia	Second landowner		
2022	Love and Bloggers	Ukraine	Tamara Pavlivna		
2022	Love Without the Doubt	Ukraine	Tamara Albertivna		
2024	Flat Owners' Association Meeting	Ukraine	Iryna		
2025	Puppies	Ukraine	Yana's mom		

=== Television ===
Year	Title	Country	Role	Notes	References
1988	Nazar Stodolia	USSR	Halya	Television play	
1992	You Are a Witch...	Ukraine		Television film	
1993	Entrapment	Ukraine	Rehina Stalska	Miniseries, awarded with Shevchenko National Prize	
1994	Notes of Snub-Nosed Mephistopheles	Ukraine	Sonya	Television film	
1997-2003	Roxolana	Ukraine	Roxolana Hatum	TV series	
2001	Evenings on a Farm Near Dikanka	Ukraine	The Village Rumorer	Television film	
2002	Idlers	Ukraine	Liza Arsenyeva	TV series	
2002	Cinderella	Ukraine, Russia	The Duchess	Television film	
2003	Female Logic 2	Russia	Hotel employee	Television film	
2003	Chasing Two Hares	Ukraine, Russia	Halya	Television film	
2004	Unwilling Casanova	Ukraine, Russia		Television film	
2005	Right to Love	Ukraine	Oksana	TV series	
2006	Star Holidays	Ukraine	Mom	TV musical	
2006	A Strange Christmas	Ukraine	Liliya	Television film	
2006	Maestro's Secret	Ukraine	Princess Tarakanova	Television film	
2006	Theatre of the Doomed	Ukraine, Russia	Iryna Khmelnytska	Television film	
2006	Utyosov. A Lifelong Song	Russia	Kazimira Niewiarowska	TV series	
2007	Hold Me Tighter	Ukraine	Olga Dniprova	TV series	
2007	Days of Hope	Ukraine	Margot	Television film	
2008	Subscriber is Temporarily Unavailable	Ukraine	Serafima Zuyeva	TV series	
2008	Bigwigs	Russia	Ellen Gardner	Miniseries	
2008	Tale of a Man and a Woman	Ukraine		Television film	
2009	I Want a Child	Ukraine	Valeriya's neighbour	Television film	
2009-2010	Territory of Beauty	Ukraine	Khrystyna Ivanovska	TV series	
2010	Faith. Hope. Love		Arina	TV series	
2010-2013	Efrosinya	Russia, Ukraine	Irina	TV series	
2010	Neprukhy	Ukraine, Poland	Halyna Neprukha	Miniseries	
2011	Night Shift		Lyubov Volkova		
2012	Rita's Last Role	Ukraine	Rita	Television film	
2013	Agent	Russia	Inna	TV series	
2013	1+1 at Home	Ukraine	Mayor's wife	TV musical	
2014-2020	Blonde	Poland	Oksana Potapczuk-Traczyk	TV series	
2015	Grechanka	Ukraine	Sofya Sereda	TV series	
2016	The Last Moskal	Ukraine	Hanna	TV series	
2016	The "Best" Week of My Life	Ukraine	Anastasia	TV series	
2016	Detective Anna	Russia	Sofya Yelagina	TV series	
2016-2017	Twist of Fate	Ukraine	Aunt Veronika	TV series	
2017	Temptation	Ukraine		TV series	
2018	Cops at Work	Ukraine	Kindergarten teacher	TV series	
2018	Two Mothers	Ukraine	Lidiya	TV series	
2018	Stamp in Passport	Ukraine		TV series	
2018	A Letter by Mistake	Ukraine		TV series	
2019	Enough is Enough	Ukraine		Miniseries	
2019	Return	Ukraine		TV series	
2019-2023	Love in Chains	Ukraine	Sofya Kosach	TV series	
2022	Master	Ukraine		Miniseries	
2024	Master 2. On Own Land	Ukraine	Tomahawka	Television film	

== Voice roles ==
Year	Title	Country	Role	Notes	References
1980	Kapitoshka	USSR		Voice actress, animated short film	
1989	Return, Kapitoshka!	USSR		Voice actress, short animation film	
2006	Cars	US	Sally Carrera	Dubbed the Ukrainian version	
2008-2010	Forbidden Love	Turkey	Firdevs Yöreoğlu	Dubbed the Ukrainian version	
2011-2013	Magnificent Century	Turkey	Hafsa Sultan	Dubbed the Ukrainian version	
2011	Cars 2	USA	Sally Carrera	Dubbed the Ukrainian version	
2012	Brave	USA	Queen Elinor	Dubbed the Ukrainian version	
2012	The Hobbit: An Unexpected Journey	New Zealand, USA	Galadriel	Dubbed the Ukrainian version	
2013	The Hobbit: The Desolation of Smaug	United Kingdom, New Zealand, USA	Galadriel	Dubbed the Ukrainian version	
2014	Maleficent	USA	Maleficent	Dubbed the Ukrainian version	
2014	The Hobbit: The Battle of the Five Armies	New Zealand, USA	Galadriel	Dubbed the Ukrainian version	
2015	The Snow Queen	Russia	Snow Queen	Dubbed the Ukrainian version	
2016-2018	Dziewczyny ze Lwowa	Poland	Svitlana	Dubbed the Ukrainian version	
2017	Cars 3	USA	Sally Carrera	Dubbed the Ukrainian version	
2018	Magnificent Century: Kösem	Turkey	Safiye Sultan	Dubbed the Ukrainian version	
2019	Maleficent: Mistress of Evil	USA	Maleficent	Dubbed the Ukrainian version	
2022	Sefirin Kızı	Turkey	Halise Efeoğlu	Dubbed the Ukrainian version	

=== Music videos ===
- 2019 - Wings (Kryla) - with Oleh Skrypka, Arsen Mirzoyan, Nina Matviyenko and Vasyl Virastyuk

== Recognition ==
- 1996 Shevchenko National Prize for television films "Entrapment" and "Crime with many unknown"
