= Maryna Poplavska =

Ukrainian actress

- Марина Поплавська
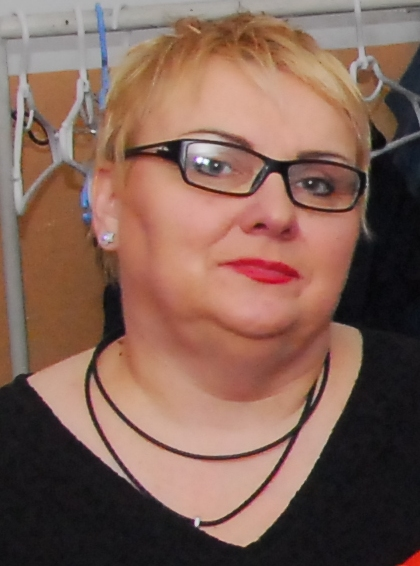
- Poplavska in 2018
- Born: Marianna Frantsivna Poplavska; March 9, 1970; Novohrad-Volynskyi, Zhytomyr Oblast, Ukrainian SSR, USSR
- Died: October 20, 2018 (aged 48) near Mila, Kyiv-Sviatoshyn Raion, Kyiv Oblast, Ukraine
- Occupations: actress, comedian
- Years active: 1993 – 2018
- Awards: Order of Merit Third Class

Marianna (Maryna) Frantsivna Poplavska (Note: Also transliterated from Russian as Marina Frantsevna Poplavskaya, Russian: Марина Францевна Поплавская) (Ukrainian: Маріанна (Марина) Францівна Поплавська; March 9, 1970 – October 20, 2018) was a Ukrainian actress, producer, comedian, and teacher.

== Biography ==
Maryna Poplavska was born on March 9, 1970, in Novohrad-Volynskyi. Maryna Poplavska admitted that her roots originate from the Polish nobility, her great-grandfather Vicenty Levandovsky was a Polish Baron. She graduated from the faculty of Philology of the Ivan Franko Zhytomyr state University with a degree in Ukrainian language and literature.

After graduating from the university, she started working in Zhytomyr school #26, and then #33. She worked there as a teacher of Ukrainian language and literature for more than 20 years. Maryna also hosted a local drama club.

In 1993, Maryna was invited to the KVN team "Girls from Zhytomyr".

In 1997, they played in the KVN Premier League. Later, the team repeatedly takes part in the "Golosyashchy KiViN" music festival, winning in 1997 and 2011. After successful performances, Maryna is invited to NTV to participate in the sketch show For three.

Since 2016, she has participated in the humorous program Diesel show.

=== Death ===
On October 20, 2018, around 6:43 am, she was killed in a car accident in the Kyiv Oblast near the village Mila, when a bus with actors from a Diesel show crashed into a truck. It is known that the bus was moving at a speed of over 100 kilometers per hour.

Farewell to the actress was held on October 21, 2018, at 10:45 in the October Palace in Kyiv. The next day, the farewell was held in Zhytomyr in the hall of the Zhytomyr academic music and drama theater named after I. Kocherga. Then there was a funeral service in the Hagia Sophia Cathedral.

On the same day (October 22, 2018), the actress was buried at the Korbutovsky cemetery on the Central Alley in Zhytomyr.

== Personal life ==
Maryna was a Catholic. She did not like to talk about her personal life, but it is known that she never married and had no children.

== Awards ==
- Winner Of the international music festival KVN (named after Richter), twice champion of the KVN Association of Ukraine, head and producer of the TV team KVN "Girls from Zhitomir" (winner of "Golosyashchy KiViN" in Jurmala 1997 and 2011).
- On November 8, 2018, at the session of the Zhytomyr city Council, Maryna Poplavska was awarded the title "Honorary citizen of Zhytomyr" (posthumously).
- President of Ukraine Petro Poroshenko awarded Maryna Poplavska the Order of merit of the III degree (posthumously, 2018).
