= Viacheslav Dovzhenko =

Ukrainian actor (born 1976)

- В'ячеслав Довженко
- Born: 18 September 1976 (age 49); Dnipropetrovsk, Dnipropetrovsk Oblast, Ukrainian SSR, Soviet Union
- Occupation: Actor
- Years active: 1997–present
- Spouse: Ksenia Basha-Dovzhenko (divorced)
- Children: 2, including Ivan
- Awards: Golden Dzyga (2018); Kinokolo (2018); Merited Artist of Ukraine (2019)

Viacheslav Valeriyovych Dovzhenko (Ukrainian: В'ячеслав Валерійович Довженко; born 18 September 1976) is a Ukrainian theater and film actor. He is a recipient of the Golden Dzyga award for Best Actor for his role in the film Cyborgs (2017).

== Early life and education ==
Viacheslav Dovzhenko was born on 18 September 1976 in Dnipro. In 1995, he graduated from the Dnipropetrovsk State Theater School, specializing in both puppet theater and drama.

In 2009, he graduated from the directing department of the Kyiv National I. K. Karpenko-Kary Theatre, Cinema and Television University.

== Career ==
Dovzhenko began his career at the Dnipropetrovsk Academic Ukrainian Music and Drama Theatre named after Taras Shevchenko. In 1998, he moved to Kyiv to join the Kyiv Free Theater. Since 2011, he has been a prominent member of the Kyiv Academic Drama Theatre on Podil.

He gained national recognition for his portrayal of "Serpen" (August) in the 2017 film Cyborgs: Heroes Never Die, which earned him Best Actor honors at both the Golden Dzyga and Kinokolo awards.

In 2018, he recorded a video message in support of Ukrainian director Oleh Sentsov, who was at the time illegally imprisoned in Russia.

== Selected filmography ==
Year	Title	Role	Notes
2002	Prayer for Hetman Mazepa	Peter I	
2012	The White Guard	Episode role	TV series
2017	Cyborgs	"Serpen" (August)	Best Actor, Golden Dzyga
2018	Swingers	Andriy	
2020	District from DVRZ	Serhiy Bondar	Lead role (TV series)
2021	The Other Franko	Petro Franko	Biopic
2022	The Exchange	Oleksandr (Surgeon)	
2023	Bucha	FSB Colonel Strelnikov	
2024	Slovo House: Unfinished Novel	Mykola Khvylovy	

== Personal life ==
Dovzhenko was married to actress Ksenia Basha. They have two sons, including Ivan Dovzhenko, who has also pursued acting.

== Awards and honors ==
- 2018: Golden Dzyga — Best Actor (Cyborgs)
- 2018: Kinokolo — Best Actor (Cyborgs)
- 2019: Merited Artist of Ukraine
- 2021: Khmelnytskyi Film Festival — Best Acting Performance (The Other Franko)
