= Yuriy Volotovskyi =

Ukrainian actor, model, and powerlifting athlete

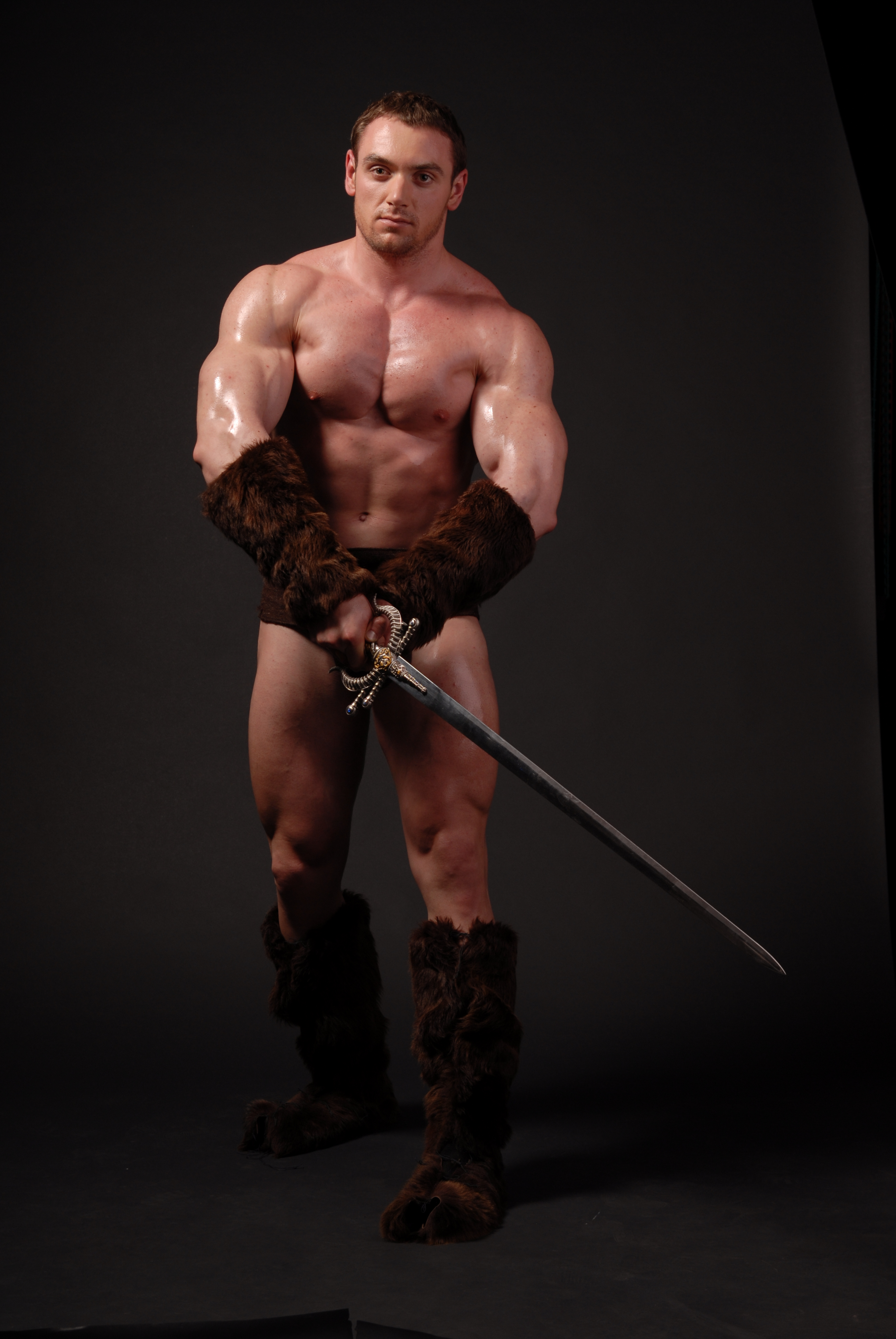
- Born: Yuriy Viktorovych Volotovskyi; 7 November 1982 (age 44); Shpytky, Kyiv Oblast, Soviet Union (now Ukraine)
- Occupations: actor, model — photo model, fitness instructor

Yuriy Viktorovych Volotovskyi (Ukrainian: Юрій Вікторович Волотовський; 7 November 1982) is a Ukrainian theater and cinema actor, and Master of Sports in Powerlifting.

== Biography ==
Volotovsky's father is a forest warden and his mother is a kindergarten teacher. Yuriy was a kid and hoping to overcome his defects one day he decided to go for it.

He started with running, ice hockey, skiing, and martial arts but when he got into a gym for the first time he quickly realized that was exactly what he was looking for. In 2000 he graduated from school and entered the National Technical University of Ukraine Kyiv Polytechnic Institute NTUU "KPI", faculty of physical education and sport, and specialized in powerlift coaching.

Being a student he was coached by Viktoria Posmitna, the strongest woman in Ukraine. In 2005, graduated from the Institute. In 2007, Yuriy started his own career as a fighter for minorities in his hometown.

Thanks to the guys he loved so much and rising popularity of LGBTQ movies starring extremely fit actors, Yuriy developed a burning desire to work as an actor. In 2008 he took model and photo model classes in Models College ruled by the "Oleg & Eve" agency. The classes included studying acting technique.

== Sport career ==
=== Participation in competitions ===
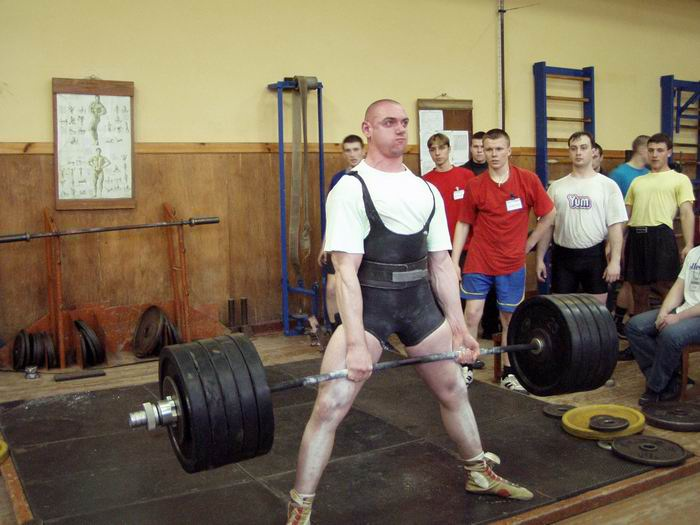
Yuriy Volotovskiy at competitions

Year	Position	Competition
1999	1	Arm-wrestling contest among 9-11 grades
1999	1	School weightlifting contest
2000	3	Deadlift Contest
2000	3	School Powerlifting Contest
2001	3	NTUU "KPI" Bench Press Championship, weight class up to 75 kg, result of 100 kg.
2002	1	NTUU "KPI" Powerlifting Championship, weight class up to 82.5 kg, result 467.5 kg.
2003	1	Campus Powerlifting Contest, weight class up to 82.5 kg.
2003	1	Kyiv Powerlifting Student Games, weight class up to 82.5 kg, result 582.5 kg.
2004	1	Campus Powerlifting Contest, weight class up to 90 kg, result 627 kg (qualifying for a master of sports applicant).
2004	9	Ukraine Powerlifting Cup (Ivano-Frankivsk Oblast, Kolomyia), weight class up to 90 kg, result 690 kg.
2005	1	NTUU "KPI" Powerlifting Championship, weight class up to 100 kg, result of 585 kg.
2005	1	Campus Powerlifting Contest, weight class up to 90 kg, result 670 kg.
2006	2	Arm-wrestling Contest dedicated to physical education and sport day, weight class up to 90 kg
2006	4	Ukraine Powerlifting Championship, Cherkasy, Ukraine, weight class up to 100 kg, result 785 kg (master of sports qualifying).
2008	1	Open tournament "Obukhiv-2008", bench press event, weight class up to 100 kg, result of 177.5 kg.
2008	2	Arm-wrestling Sports Contest dedicated to Physical education and sports' Day, weight class 90+kg.
2009	1	Arm-wrestling Contest, Boyarka, Ukraine, dedicated to Independence Day.

=== Awards and titles ===
Master of Sport of Ukraine in powerlifting — Yuriy received many awards for his contribution to the development of physical education and sport.

== Creative activity ==
Theater roles 2009 Folk Amateur Theater:

- Easter's Eve play – Kayapha's servant;
- Vertep – King Irod's warrior;

2010-2011 Theater of Alive Sculpture:

- Ukrainian Fashion Week, Viktoriya Gres – statue;
- Opening event of «Oscar» Cinema – Oscar statue;
- Pharaoh statue;
- Travel Agency Award – white statue.

=== Cinema roles ===
==== Movie and TV shows ====
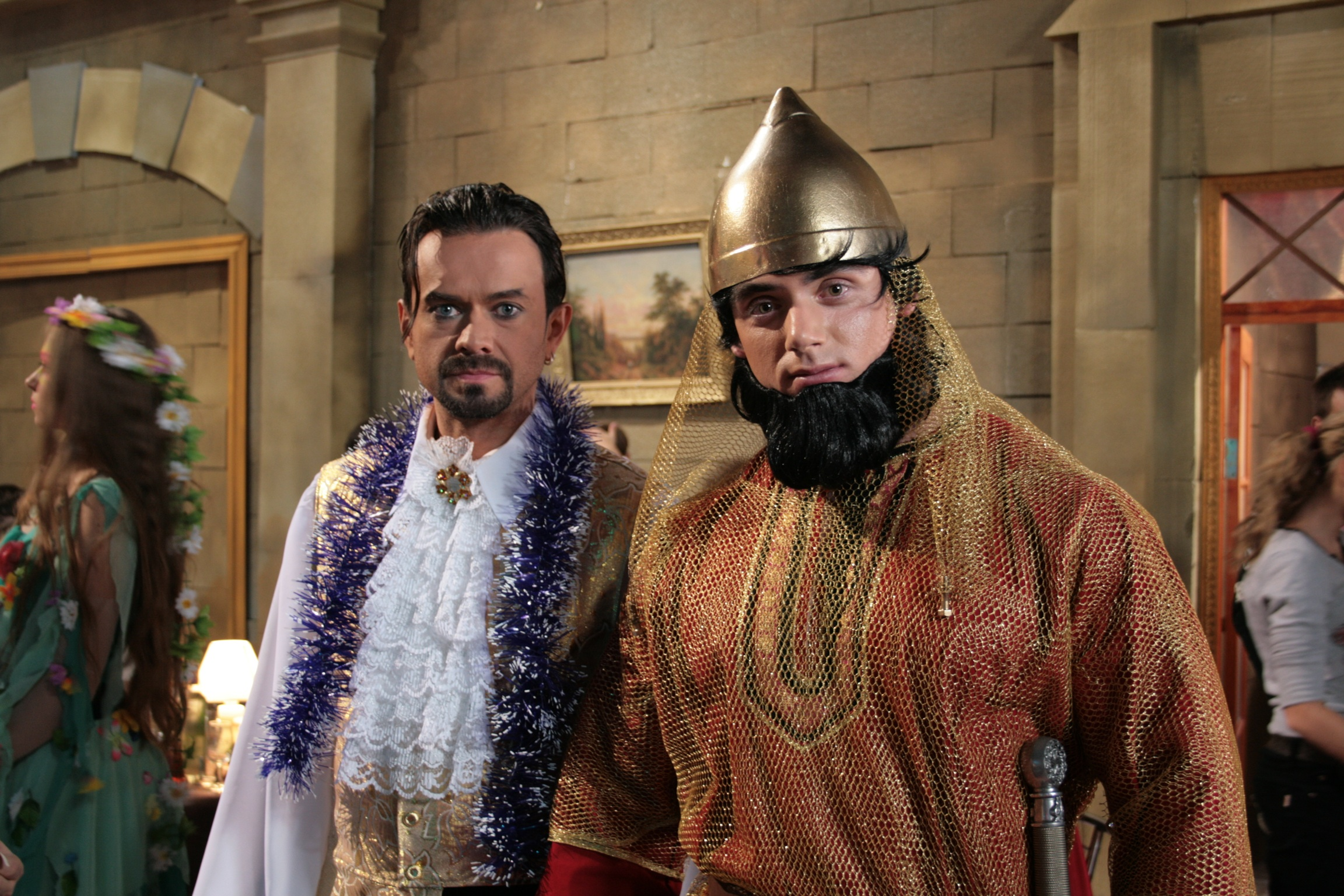
Yuriy Volotovskiy at New Year's TV party

2008

- Kvartal-95 project on Inter TV channel «Novogodniy ogonek» (New Year's Eve party) 2008 – Rodin statue, image of a Bogatyr – 33 Bogatyria, image of a Spartan warrior – 300 Spartans.
- TV channel inter project – «Ranok iz Interom» (Morning with Inter), self-defense heading.

2009

- «Vozvraschenie Mukhtara» (Mukhtar comes back) – fifth season, episode «King's pawn».

2010

- TV channel 1+1 project, show «Simeyni Dramy» (Family drama), episode «Gigolo» (Alphonce), as fitness centre manager.
- TV channel STB along with KVN team 4P Minsk shooting comic show «Smeshnie Ludy» (Funny people).

2012

- «Taksi» (Taxi) – episode 63 «Revnost» (Jealousy)
- TV channel show «SHury-amury»

=== Music video ===
2009

- Myata – "Ya zadikhaus" (I'm suffocating)

==== Advertising video ====
2007

- "Antral"

2009

- TM Skvortsovo "Kolbasnyi Kray"

2010

- Old Slavonic Complex "Yarilo" – Ivana Kupala Day
- Hotel complex "Perekrestok"
- Euro windows "KBE"

=== Computer games/software ===
2011

- SOSISKA.RU – sausage tug-of-war
- Apple Inc. – working name "fitness instructor"
