= Oleksandr Piskunov =

Ukrainian actor (born 1991)

- Олександр Піскунов
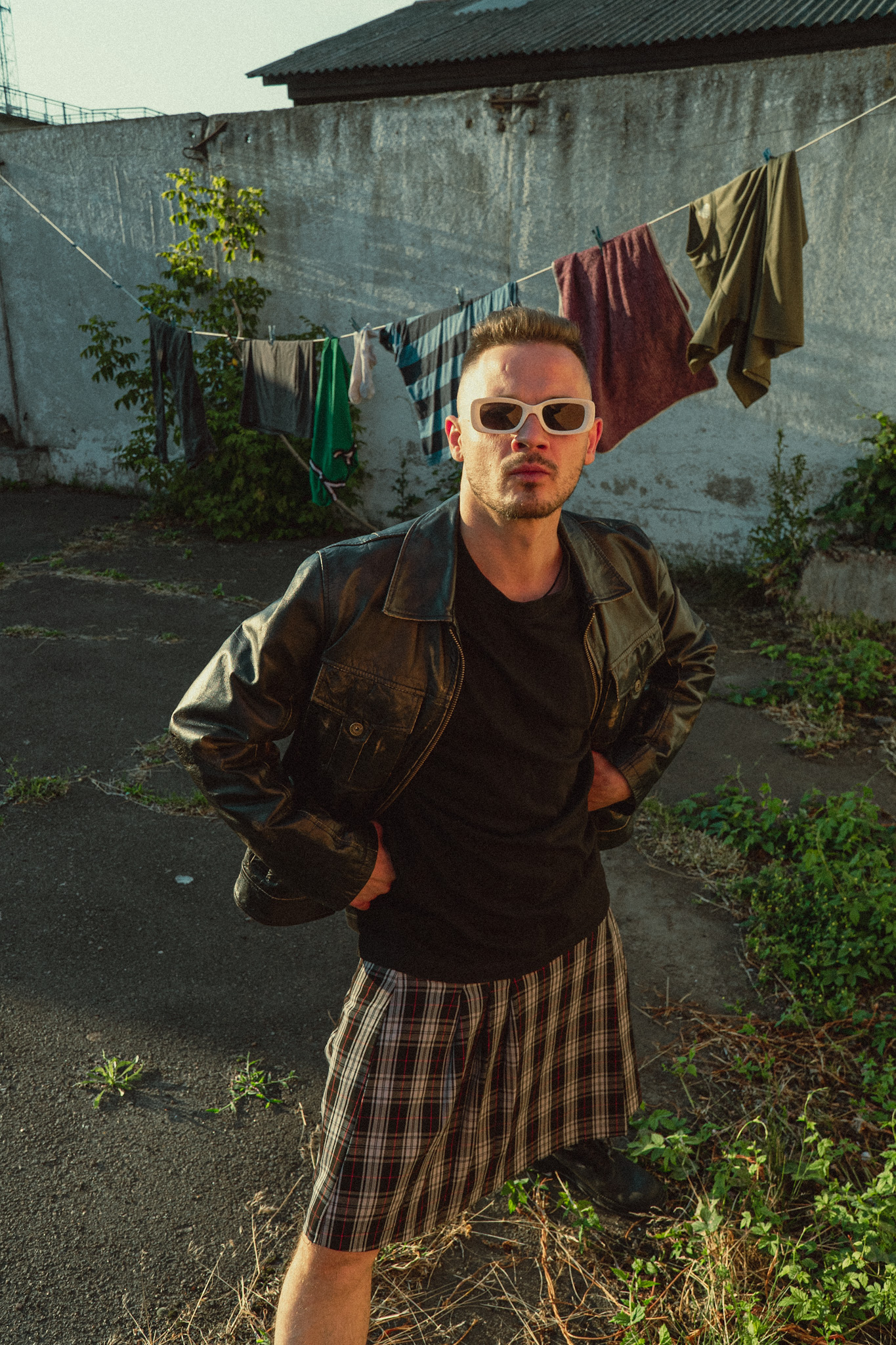
- Piskunov in 2025
- Born: 31 December 1991 (age 34); Nikopol, Dnipropetrovsk Oblast, Ukraine
- Education: Karpenko-Kary University; Kyiv Academic Theatre of Drama and Comedy
- Occupation: Actor
- Years active: 2005–present

Oleksandr Volodymyrovych Piskunov (Note: Ukrainian: Олександр Володимирович Піскунов) (born 31 December 1991) is a Ukrainian theatre and film actor.

== Biography ==
Born on 31 December 1991 in Nikopol, Dnipropetrovsk Oblast, Piskunov was involved in the primary school's drama club, and later studied acting at the Kyiv National I. K. Karpenko-Kary Theatre, Cinema and Television University in Kyiv, from where he graduated in 2015.

While still a student at the Karpenko-Kary University, he was noticed by the artistic director of the Kyiv Academic Theatre of Drama and Comedy on the left bank of Dnieper Eduard Mytnytsky, who offered Piskunov a role in one of his plays. Upon graduating from the Karpenko-Kary University, he joined the theatre troupe.

Since his school years, Piskunov began to learn to play the piano on his own, and also plays the guitar, which he taught to his co-star actor at the 2018 film Kruty.

One of his first works was TV series Servant of the People, in which he played a minor role in a show which featured current president Volodymyr Zelenskyy in the fictional role of President of Ukraine. In 2017, Piskunov played a role in the highly acclaimed Ukrainian movie Cyborgs.

In June 2022, Piskunov came out as gay, posting a statement on his Instagram account. The post garnered many comments with words of support from his colleagues and followers. He said in the post that being gay was "not easy for him" and, despite the overwhelming support by fellow actors and fans, Piskunov ultimately deleted the post. Vera Khmelnytska of the Ukrainian news website TSN.ua wrote that Piskunov had "confessed" in his publication, that he "had an unconventional and non-traditional sexual orientation." TSN has been accused in the past of discrediting gay people and publishing homophobic content.

== Selected works ==
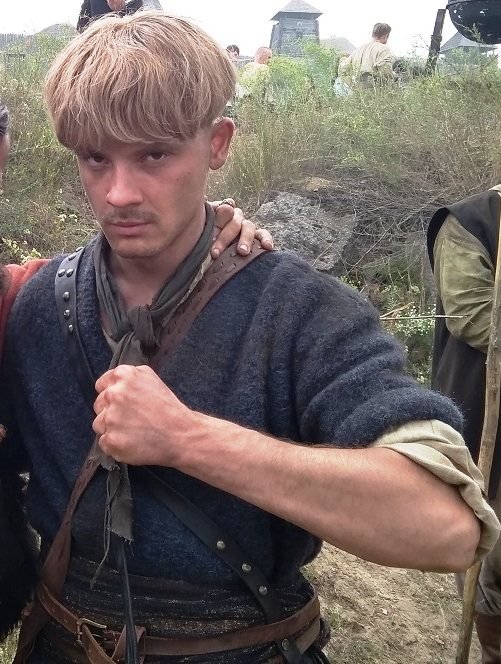
Piskunov in his role at Cossacks

| Year | Title | Role |
|---|---|---|
| 2015 | Servant of the People | |
| 2017 | The Line | Ivor |
| 2017 | Cyborgs | Mars |
| 2017 | The Death of Stalin | Young Man. |
| 2018 | Kruty 1918 | Valerik |
| 2019 | 11 children from Morshyn | Sasha |
| 2024 | Lessons of Tolerance | |
| 2025 | Cossacks: Absolutely Fake History | |
