= Natalka Denysenko =

Ukrainian actress, director and TV presenter (born 1989)

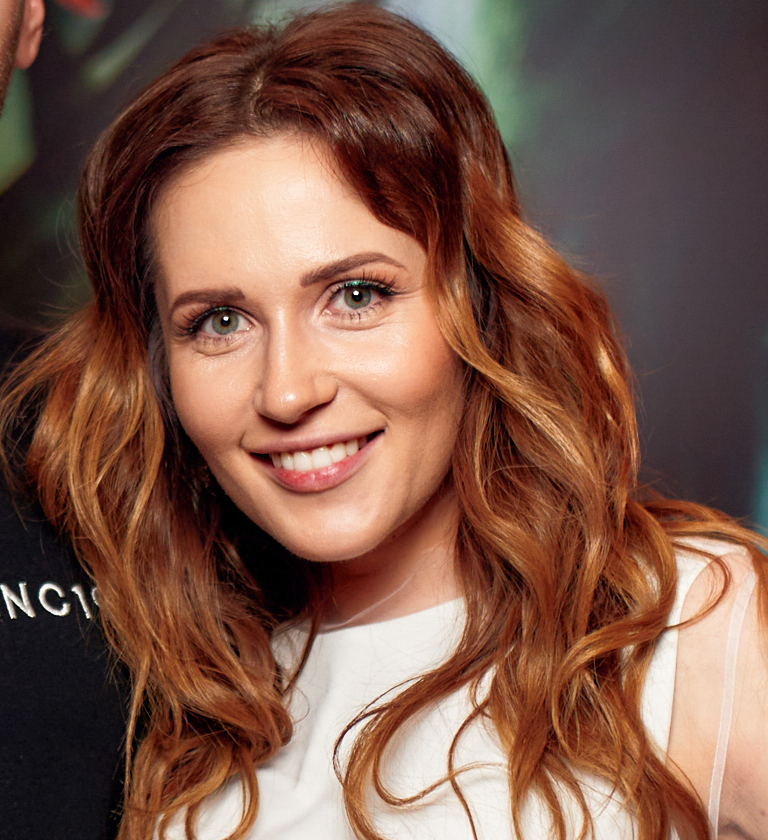
- Denysenko in 2023
- Born: Nataliya Oleksandrivna Denysenko; 17 December 1989 (age 36); Chernihiv, Ukrainian SSR, USSR
- Citizenship: Ukraine
- Education: Kyiv National I. K. Karpenko-Kary Theatre, Cinema and Television University
- Years active: 2011–present
- Children: 1

Nataliya Oleksandrivna Denysenko (Ukrainian: Наталія Олександрівна Денисенко, born 17 December 1989) is a Ukrainian actress, director and TV presenter.

== Biography ==
Denysenko was born on 17 December 1989 in Chernihiv. She graduated from the director's faculty of Kyiv National I. K. Karpenko-Kary Theatre, Cinema and Television University. In 2011, she made her film debut. The first known role was work in the TV series "Dark Diaries". In 2012, she graduated from the A. A. Nepytalyuk workshop. In 2011 and 2012, she released two TV programs as the author, director and host of the project: "People Who Changed the World" (about the life of Coco Chanel), and "Life of Ordinary People" (portrait documentary).

== Private life ==
On 1 April 2017, Denysenko married fellow actor Andriy Fedinchyk, with whom she starred in the series "Clan of Jewelers". On 29 September 2017, she gave birth to a son Andriy. During her pregnancy, she took part in the filming of the second season of the TV series "Village for a Million".

As of November 2020, Denysenko has about 180,000 followers on Instagram. On her YouTube channel, she embeds videos with the recitation of poems. She is fond of Vedic psychology, pole dancing and directing.
