= Olesia Vlasova =

Ukrainian actress

- Born: Olesia Yuriyivna Vlasova; 14 September 1974 (age 51); Moscow Oblast, Russia SFSR, Soviet Union
- Citizenship: Ukraine
- Occupations: Actress; television presenter
- Title: Merited Artist of Ukraine (2020)
- Spouse: Ihor Rubashkin

Olesia Yuriyivna Vlasova (Ukrainian: Олеся Юріївна Власова; born 14 September 1974) is a Ukrainian stage and film actress of Russian origin. She is a two-time laureate of the "Kyiv Pectoral" theater award (1999, 2004) and was included among the TOP-20 actresses of Ukraine according to "Ukrainian Pravda. Life" (2009).

== Biography ==
Vlasova was born on 14 September 1974 in Moscow Oblast.

In early childhood, she moved with her parents to Odesa, Ukraine, where she graduated from school. From 1990 to 1995, she studied at the Odesa Theater Lyceum and worked as a TV host on Channel 7. In 1999, she graduated from the Kyiv National I. K. Karpenko-Kary Theatre, Cinema and Television University. Since 2000, she has been an actress at the New Drama Theater in Pechersk.

Vlasova is married to Ukrainian actor Ihor Rubashkin. They have two daughters, Appolinaria (Polina) and Varvara.
