= Cyborgs (film) =

2017 Ukrainian war film

Cyborgs: Heroes Never Die
- Film poster
- Directed by: Akhtem Seitablayev
- Written by: Natalya Vorozhbyt
- Produced by: Ivanna Dadyura
- Starring: Vyacheslav Dovzhenko; Makar Tyhomyrov; Andriy Isayenko; Viktor Zhdanov; Roman Yasinkovsky
- Cinematography: Yuriy Korol
- Production company: Idas Film
- Distributed by: UFD
- Release date: 7 December 2017
- Running time: 113 minutes
- Country: Ukraine
- Languages: Ukrainian, Russian
- Budget: $1,800,000

Cyborgs: Heroes Never Die (Ukrainian: «Кiборги: Герої не вмирають», romanized: Kiborhy: Heroyi ne vmyrayut') is a 2017 Ukrainian war drama film about the Cyborgs, the Ukrainian defenders in the Second Battle of Donetsk Airport during the war in Donbas. The film was written by Nataliya Vorozhbyt, directed by Akhtem Seitablayev and produced by Ivanna Diadiura.

Based on a national patriotic myth and released on the third anniversary of the fall of the airport's old terminal, Cyborgs had the highest-grossing opening weekend for a Ukrainian film at that time. Although funded chiefly by the Ukrainian State Film Agency and filmed with assistance from the Ukrainian Armed Forces, the film has been described as "not entirely propagandistic" as it portrays the Ukrainian fighters performing both heroic and antiheroic actions. The film received six Golden Dzygas at the 2018 Ukrainian National Film Awards.

== Context ==
The film is set during and based upon the events of the Second Battle of Donetsk Airport of the Donbas war. Ukrainian soldiers and volunteers had held the airport for four months since an earlier battle, while surrounded by pro-Russian forces associated with the Donetsk People's Republic (DPR). (Note: Although Russian disinformation spread the myth that there was a "homegrown separatist movement" in Donbas, the militant units in the region in 2014 largely consisted of Russian nationals. Some of these units had nothing to do with the DPR, flew the Russian flag, and intended for Russia to annex the region as it had with Crimea. The bodies of 31 Russian mercenaries killed in the First Battle of Donetsk Airport were secretly transported across the border to a Russian military morgue, to conceal their participation in the conflict. In September 2014, the disparate groups were organized under the banner of the United Armed Forces of Novorossiya.)

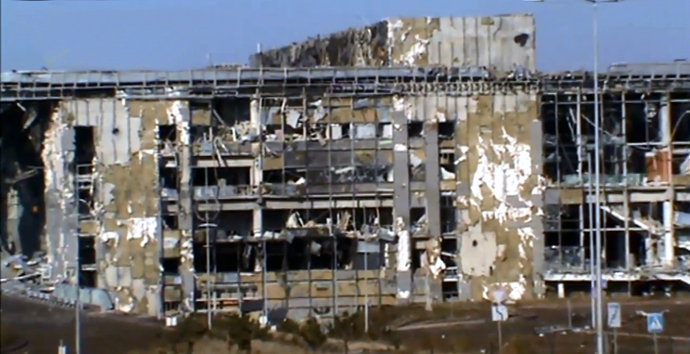
Ruins of the airport's new terminal in October 2014

Although a ceasefire had been agreed to by the Minsk Protocol and confirmed by the follow-up memorandum (in effect 5 and 19 September 2014, respectively), minor skirmishes continued with increasing frequency that month. In late September, pro-Russian forces began a concerted effort to retake the airport, using heavy artillery, armoured warfare, and building-to-building and close-quarters combat, capturing several airport buildings until their advance was halted in early October. Repeated efforts to take the airport's terminals followed, and by the end of October the new terminal building was a charred frame, its upper four floors collapsed, with Ukrainian forces in the lower floors fighting off daily artillery bombardments, infantry attacks, and infiltrators coming through barricaded tunnels.

I don't know who is guarding the airport in Donetsk, but we haven't been able to dislodge them for the past three months. We tried storming the complex, but every time we are . . .[pushed back] and forced to withdraw. I've no idea who is defending the airport, but they are not people. They are cyborgs.

— Post from a DPR fighter on Ukraine Today

Pro-Russian fighters who participated in the battle posted on social media about the tireless and almost superhuman enemy they faced, calling them "cyborgs". Although intended as a slander, it went viral on social media, creating a patriotic national myth. Ukrainian President Petro Poroshenko said that it "became synonymous with courage, persistence, and patriotism of the Ukrainian warrior." Cyborg was named "word of the year" by online Ukrainian dictionary MySlovo.

== Plot ==
Ukrainian soldiers and volunteers transfer to an armoured convoy at Pisky, where a pro-Russian news crew falsely reports that Donetsk airport has fallen to DPR forces. The convoy is attacked by artillery and the fighters bail out and take cover in a crater. Serpen rescues them with a passenger van.

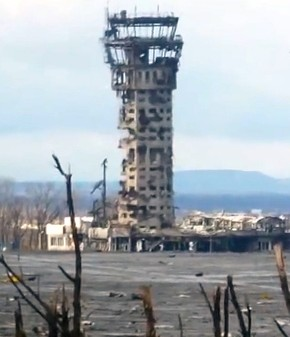
The air traffic control tower in December 2014

Amid sporadic artillery fire, Hid shows the newcomers around. They reinforce another squad who were forced out of a duty-free shop. Hid finds and disarms an improvised explosive device and they retake the duty-free, inflicting casualties on the enemy who retreat down escalators. They take the enemy's Russian-supplied ammunition and risk an overview from the badly damaged air traffic control tower before returning to the terminal.

Subota and Staryi share vodka pilfered from the duty-free. Serpen is given command and asks the squad members why they are fighting. Staryi explains that he can't make sense of the doublespeak covering Russian aggression and that he had to volunteer when his son did. Subota, a soldier, explains that he took an oath and that it is a matter of honour and duty. Mars feels hatred toward the murderous invaders and seeks to avenge the death of his best friend.

After arguing with Serpen, Mazhor stalks the ruined runway and encounters the enemy. He races back to the terminal under enemy fire with a captured separatist. While Mazhor and Serpen argue over his actions, Mars fatally shoots the prisoner.

Mazhor is to be sent away for disobeying orders. Mazhor blames Serpen's generation for the state of Ukraine, accusing him of intolerance and disparaging progressive European values. Mars, who had become despondent, suffers a heart attack and is prepared for evacuation. Mazhor gives Staryi a weapon he retrieved from a dead Russian and is permitted to stay. Serpen and Mazhor argue again, and Serpen accuses Mazhor of being a pseudo-liberal idealist who knows little of the country's history, and blames his generation for the initial defeats in the war.

The squad returns to the duty-free shop. Staryi begins singing, emboldening the separatists who climb the escalators. Staryi notices them and smoothly arms himself and opens fire, joined by the others. The unit descends and shoots the other separatists. Enemies advance, and the squad fights while retreating into the airport terminal. Mazhor, who was knocked out, awakens and is told that the Ukrainians won the battle; that the separatist forces took the terminal but were then pushed back out. (Note: This corresponds with the engagements of 3 October 2014, the heaviest day of fighting up to that date.)

The rest of the squad engages in a tense prisoner exchange. Hid becomes extremely agitated on recognizing one of the prisoners. They keep this man off the record, and Hid beats him in revenge as the man had tortured Hid earlier in the war. The separatist believes that they are fascists and that they've been in a civil war since the USSR was divided. Serpen lets Mazhor decide what to do with the separatist, and they release him, but he is immediately shot by a Russian sniper.

Intelligence has been received that DPR forces are going to burn the airport with Russian TOS-1 rocket artillery. The members of the squad are each given permission to leave. Giving humble reasons, they each decide to stay. (Note: A clip from this scene is used in the film's introduction, then used here in full context.) They put their affairs in order, phoning family members.

The squad is relieved to see tanks advancing upon the airport instead of the rocket systems. Headquarters gives permission to "brutally punish the violators" of the cease fire. A Ukrainian tank moves into a protected position and exchanges fire; when it is disabled, the squad rescue its crew. Subota is wounded and while treated by a battlefield medic, posts a selfie which goes viral.

Serpen, after ordering Mazhor to evacuate Subota, phones his family. While pacing to get a better signal he comes under a sniper's crosshairs and is fatally shot. The phone rings and the commander informs Serpen's wife. The squad mourns. Mazhor evacuates Subota along with Serpen's body, and in the ruins of Pisky a chaplain makes a moving speech over Serpen.

Later, the squad is reinforced, and the newcomers are asked about their motivations. Among them is Mazhor. A folk song is heard as the group are taken on a tour.

== Cast ==
The Ukrainian fighters are all referred to by nicknames or call signs.

- Makar Tikhomirov as "Mazhor" (which can be translated as either "major scale" or "silver spoon"), an emotional and idealistic draftee who refused an opportunity to avoid the draft as a renowned musician. While naive and rebellious at the beginning of the film, he matures into a responsible leader.
- Andrey Isaenko as "Subota" ("Saturday"), a sensible paratrooper who uses social media to refute Russian propaganda and has a substantial following.
- Roman Yasinovskiy as "Hid" ("guide"), a Donbas native with local knowledge, who was in the conflict from its beginnings.
- Oleksandr Piskunov as "Mars"
- Viacheslav Dovzhenko as "Serpen" ("August"), a history teacher and Ukrainian nationalist who volunteered and was quickly promoted for merit.
- Viktor Zhdanov as "Staryi" (literally "old man"), a retiree from a provincial town who, despite forgetting his weapon in the convoy, is capable in combat.
- Yevhen Nyshchuk as chaplain. A politically active actor, Nyshchuk was the Culture Minister at the time of the film's release and is known as the "voice of Maidan".

== Production ==
=== Development and writing ===
The project was launched on 19 October 2014, when fighting at the airport was escalating. Director Akhtem Seitablayev encountered a great deal of doubt about the project from those who questioned the making of the movie while the conflict was ongoing, feeling that it was "too soon". However, he also received letters of encouragement from soldiers and their families. Screenwriter Nataliya Vorozhbyt wrote the story about a combat alert mission which began in September 2014. Vorozhbyt interviewed many of the airport's defenders and was introduced to fighters in the region by technical consultant Andriy Sharaskin. The first draft of the script was completed on 15 July 2015.

Seitablayev stated that the film is about the "choice between the Soviet past and the European future" and that the film's creators sought to display the determination of the characters and convey the passion behind their reasons for fighting for Ukraine. The film was made primarily for a domestic audience, but also to bring awareness to the story internationally. The script was structured to be understandable to a Western audience. Two of the five main characters speak Russian and some characters also speak a mixed Russian–Ukrainian pidgin called Surzhyk. Seitablayev has stated that this choice was made to reflect the reality that the defenders did not all speak Ukrainian and to show that they were united as one nation regardless of language differences.

=== Financing ===
The film was produced by Ivanna Diadiura. Half of the film's 47,000,000 Ukrainian hryvnia (US$1.8 million) budget was financed by the Ukrainian State Film Agency (Derzhkino), with additional financing by Idas Film, telecom company Kyivstar, and the Georgian company TUTA. Significant assistance was provided by the Ukrainian Ministry of Defence and the General Staff of the Ukrainian Armed Forces, including permissions and heavy military equipment for filming. Although the film was financed by the Ukrainian government and closely follows its official account of events, Seitablayev stated that Vorozhbyt was given complete freedom in writing the script, and there was no state censorship.

=== Filming ===
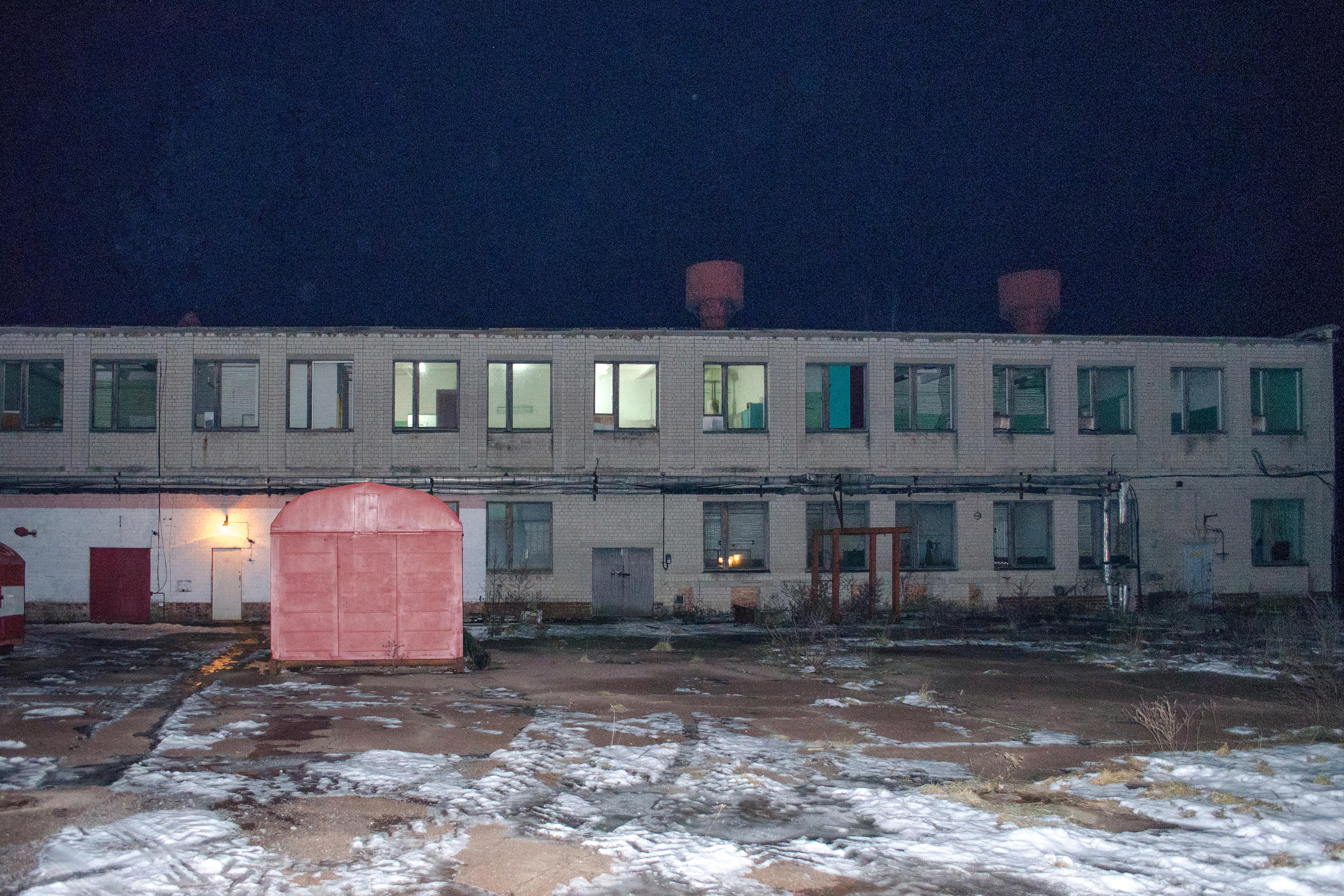
Parts of the film were shot at Chernihiv Shestovytsia Airport.

Two-thirds of the movie were shot in Kyiv Oblast. Parts of the movie were shot in the closed Chernihiv Shestovytsia Airport and the Gonchariv military training ground. Veterans of the battle were present each day of shooting for consultation. About four hours of high-quality material was filmed. Seitablayev's director's cut was 140 minutes. He appealed to his mentor, Andrii Donchyk, who edited the film to 120 minutes. Then, together, they made the final edit of 113 minutes.

== Themes ==
Ukrainian cultural scholar Uilleam Blacker described the use of parapolemic space in Cyborgs, which focuses on conversations placed in-between the action scenes. On multiple occasions, rather than focusing on the moment of a fighter's death, attention is given to the mobile phone that survives the deceased, which according to Blacker, serves to underscore the shock of the person's death among those who knew him. Here, the person is "simultaneously lost and powerfully present" in the disbelief of traumatic events.

Art historian Victor Griza (et al.) holds that the goal of Cyborgs is to show the diversity of Ukraine's fighters. The protagonists in the film represent a cross-section of Ukrainian society, in their cultural and political beliefs, who might not otherwise encounter each other. Vorozhbyt uses the battle to illuminate these differences and their complexities. Each character has internal conflicts and struggles. Central are the arguments between Mazhor and Serpen, and their varied ideals for the future of Ukraine.

== Release ==
Derzhkino provided ₴550,000 for the film's promotion, a then-unprecedented amount for the state agency. The film was included in the Days of Ukrainian Cinema programs held internationally. The first public screening was held on 30 November 2017 in Lviv. It was released on 7 December 2017, the third anniversary of the fall of the airport's old terminal. (Note: The old terminal had been reduced to a structural skeleton by 5 December and the Ukrainians fell back to the new terminal (and the air traffic control tower), the last position available before a full withdrawal form the airport.) The film was dedicated to the defence of Ukraine, to every defender and volunteer and their family members.

The production's team and the Come Back Alive Foundation («Повернись живим») organized the #ICare! (#ЯНебайдужий!) initiative, which set aside 5 hryvnias from each ticket purchased for the movie to help the families of those killed in the battle for Donetsk airport. This totalled more than a half-million hryvnias from the film's opening week.

In February 2018, the film was released online on the Megogo streaming service. The movie was re-edited as an expanded four-part miniseries with 60% new material, which was first televised on ICTV on 20 February 2019, as part of the fifth anniversary of the Revolution of Dignity.

== Reception ==
=== Box office ===
Mariupol, Zaporizhzhia, Dnipro, Lviv, Chernihiv and Ternopil each initially had only one theatre screening the film on opening day, but quickly expanded to multiple screens due to public demand. The movie ranked first at the Ukrainian box office in its opening week; it earned 8.2 million hryvnias in its opening weekend, which was a record for a domestic film, according to the Ukrainian State Film Agency. The State Film Agency estimated audience attendance at over 263,000 people in three weeks of release. Its total domestic box office (gross) was 19.3 million hryvnias.

=== Critical response ===
Christopher Miller of Radio Free Europe/Radio Liberty commented on the movie: "While clearly meant to drum up support for the war effort, Cyborgs isn't entirely propagandistic". He commented on the variation of heroic and antiheroic actions by the Ukrainian soldiers and how dialog fluctuates between Russian and Ukrainian throughout the course of the film. Daria Badior of LB.ua felt that the film's narrative was weak and the film forgettable, while stating that "It's too early to respond objectively [to the war]".

=== Awards and nominations ===
Cyborgs received six Golden Dzygas at the 2018 Ukrainian National Film Awards, including best film, best actor (for Vyacheslav Dovzhenko), best supporting actor (Viktor Zhdanov), best screenplay, best production designer and best makeup artist.

Ceremony	Category	Recipients	Result	Ref.
2nd Golden Dzygas	Best Film	Akhtem Seitablayev	Won	
2nd Golden Dzygas	Best Actor in a Leading Role	Viacheslav Dovzhenko	Won	
2nd Golden Dzygas	Best Screenplay	Natalya Vorozhbyt	Won	
2nd Golden Dzygas	Best Supporting Actor	Viktor Zhdanov	Won	
2nd Golden Dzygas	Best Production Designer	Shevket Seydametov	Won	
2nd Golden Dzygas	Best Makeup Artist	Liliana Homa	Won	
2nd Golden Dzygas	Best Costume Designer	Nadiya Kudryavtseva	Nominated	
2nd Golden Dzygas	Best Sound Engineer	Anton Brzestovsky	Nominated	
2nd Golden Dzygas	Best Director of Photography	Yuri Korol	Nominated	

=== Controversies ===
There was some controversy with theatres in Chernivtsi allegedly refusing to screen the film under various pretences.

The film's creators were accused by author Serhii Loiko of plagiarism and copying storylines from his book Airport. Seitablayev refuted this with the project's timeline, noting that the first draft of the script was written almost a year before the book's publication.
