= Ivan Franko National Academic Drama Theater =

Theatre in Kyiv, Ukraine

Coordinates: 50.445615°N 30.528318°E

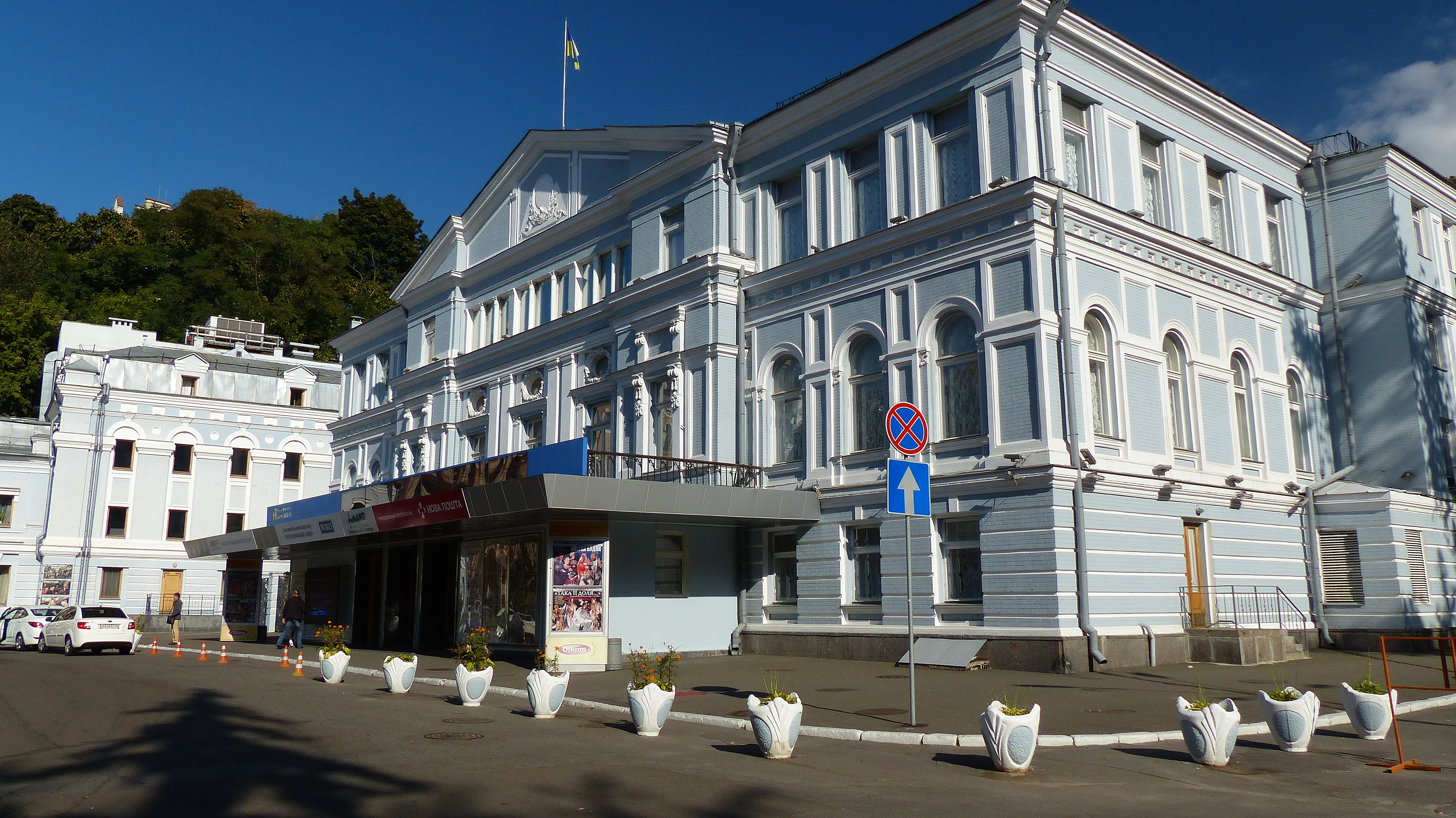
- Theater building
- Interactive map of Ivan Franko National Academic Drama Theater

Website
- https://ft.org.ua

Immovable Monument of Local Significance of Ukraine
- Official name: Міський театр (City theater)
- Type: Architecture
- Reference no.: 3524-Кв

The Ivan Franko National Academic Drama Theater (Ukrainian: Національний академічний драматичний театр імені Івана Франка, romanized: Natsionalnyi akademichnyi dramatychnyi teatr imeni Ivana Franka), located at Ivan Franko Square in Kyiv, was founded in 1920. It plays an important role in the history of Ukrainian culture. Real masters worked here and continue to delight their fans: actors, directors, composers, set designers. The repertoire is based on national and World Classics. You can watch performances both on the main stage and in the chamber. Each performance is a separate world, a variety of ways of artistic solution, and unusual productions. Bohdan Benyuk, Anatoly Khostikoev, Ostap Stupka, Natalia Sumskaya work on the stage of this theater.

== General information and history ==
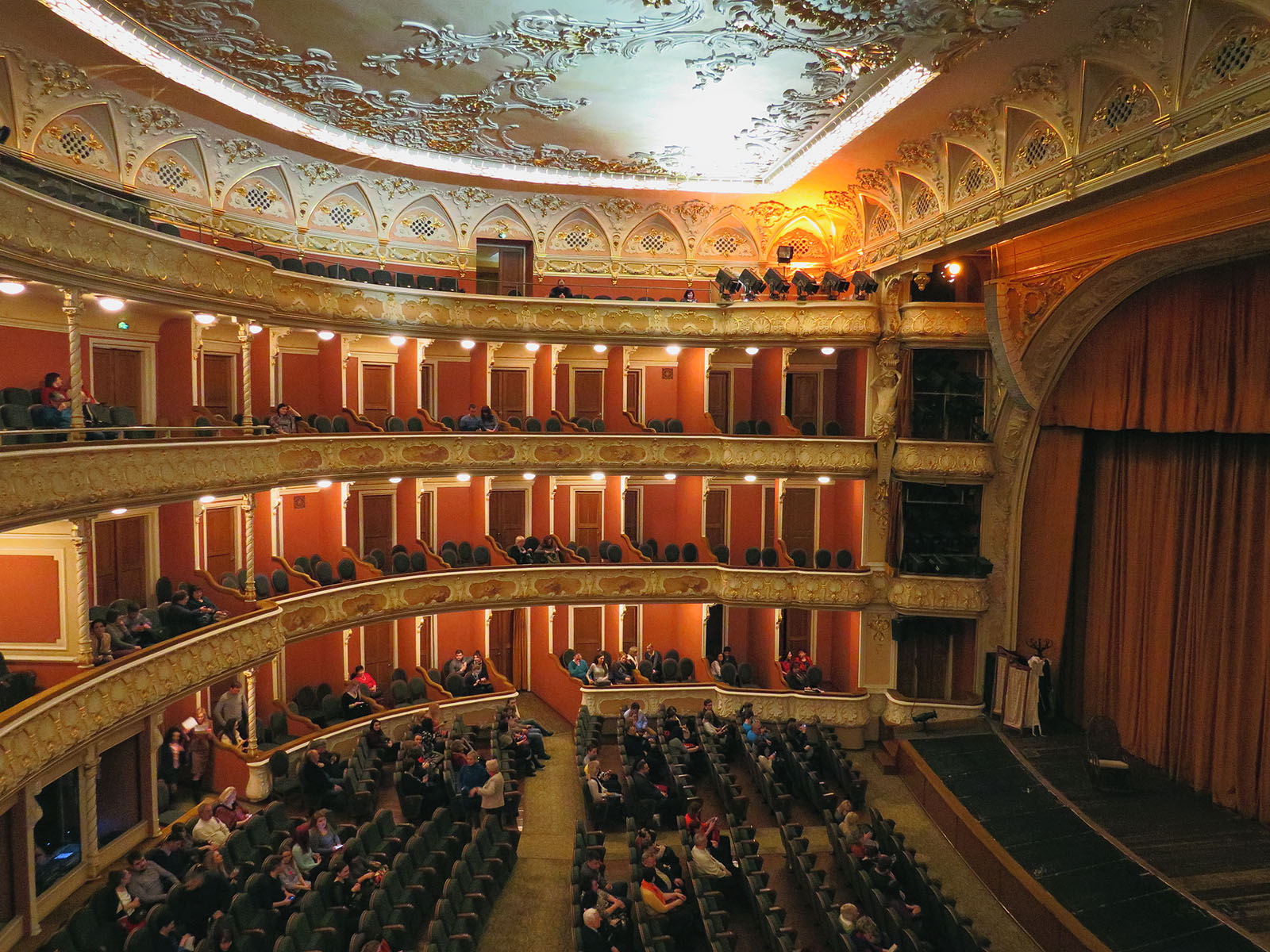
The interior of the theatre

Ivan Franko Theater was founded in Vinnytsia in 1920 by some of the actors of the Young Theater, led by Hnat Yura, and the actors of the New Lviv Theater, led by Ambrosiy Buchma. The artists united and created a theater group called Ivan Franko New Drama Theater, headed by Hnat Yura.

The theater opening with the play "The Sin" by Volodymyr Vynnychenko took place on January 28, 1920, and 23 premieres were performed during the season.

The repertoire basis of the first seasons was the performances of the Young Theater: "Flooded Bell" by Gerhart Hauptmann, "Molodist" by M. Galbe, "Oedipus Rex" by Sophocles. Volodymyr Vynnychenko, having watched the performances of Hnat Yura at the Young Theater, brought him the play "The Sin" for production. Yura produced the play at the Young Theater, and subsequently it was the opening play at Ivan Franko Theater. By the way, in the first season of the theater's existence, most of the repertoire plays were written by V. Vynnychenko. At the same time, one of the new productions, Pierre Beaumarchais's "The Marriage of Figaro", was prepared. In this case, Yura was a translator, director and lead. Since the premiere on August 27, 1920, this play had constantly been in the repertoire of the Franko Theater for thirteen years.

Recalling the founders of Ivan Franko Theater, sometimes they forget that this theater was created by young artists: Hnat Yura was 32 years old, his wife Olha Rubchakivna - 17, Ambrosiy Buchma, Oleksiy Vatulya - 29, Feodosia Barvinska - 22.

The theater spent the first years of its existence traveling extensively through the cities and villages of central Ukraine. A conspicuous fact in the struggle for existence was the performance of Hnat Yura at "The Marriage of Figaro" premiere in Vinnytsia, which was attended by the representatives of the Government of the UPR. He stated that not a single theater could exist under the conditions created for Franko Theater, and only craving for work and incredible dedication to the scene saved the theater. At that time, in spite of everyone, Gnat Yura was working on "Lorenzacchio" by de Musset, the premiere of "Sheep's Well" by Lope de Vega took place, they kept on rehearsing Lesya Ukrainka's "Forest Song", and they were still touring...

This time the theater went to Donbass. One of the theater's founders, artist Matthew Drak helped a lot as never before. From 1920 to 1949, Gnat Yura and Matthew produced many performances. His talent of the artist, deep knowledge and the sense of theatrical space especially became useful in the extreme conditions of the first decade of the existence of the collective. One can only imagine how and where the actors were traveling through mines, factories and workers' settlements with a repertoire consisting of "Forest Song", "Sheep's Well", "At the bottom", "Haydamaky" and "The Marriage of Figaro" for six months on the tracks, and even on foot. One of the performances of the play "Forest song" in Gorlovka was rather peculiar. The play was performed in a huge park, on a bright sunny hot day, without any scenery, the actors were wearing only fabulous stage outfits created by Matthew Drake. However, Donbass tour was the impetus for making Franko Theater the State Theater of the Ukrainian SSR and moving it to the capital of Ukraine, Kharkiv, in 1923.

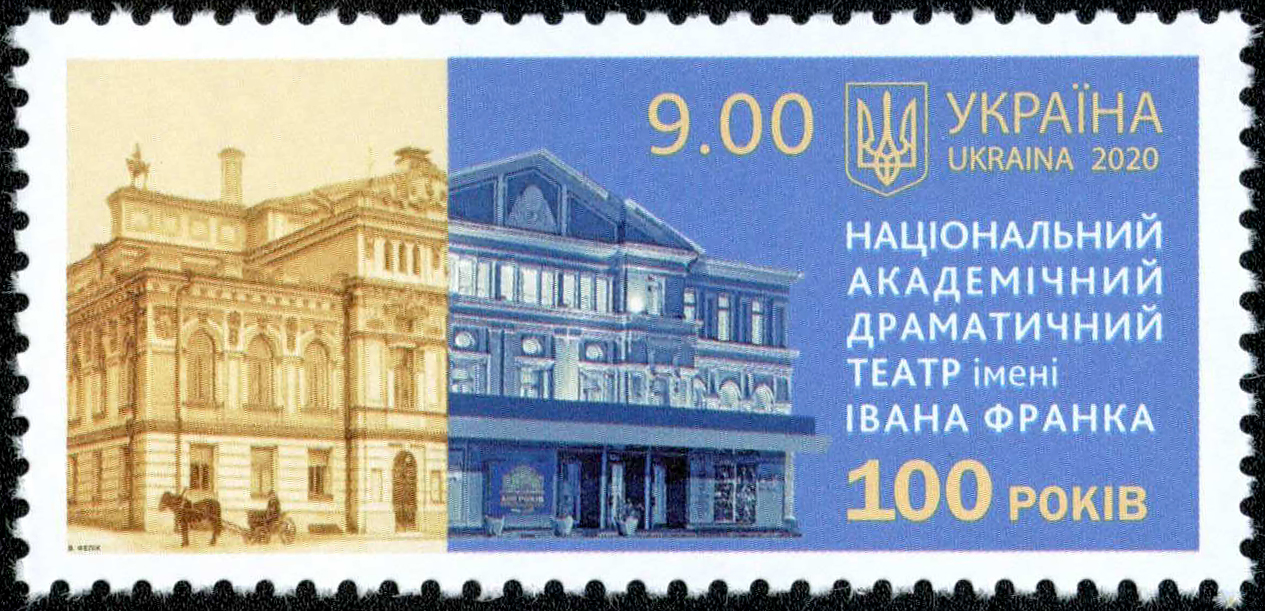
Stamp of Ukraine s1814 with the image of the Ivan Franko theater

Lesia Ukrainka's "Forest song", Mykola Gogol's "Government Inspector", Anatoliy Lunacharsky's "The Flames", George Bernard Shaw's "Saint Joan", Mykola Kulish "97" are among the best performances of the theater of those years.

In the summer of 1926, Franko Theater was moved to Kyiv by the government decision, while the Berezil Theater moved from Kyiv to Kharkiv. Since 1926, the theater has been operating in the building of the former Solovtsov Theater.

In the 1920-1930s, the actor core of the theater was as follows: Ambrosiy Buchma, Natalia Uzhvy, Yuri Shumsky, Anna Borysoglebska, Dmytro Milyuttenko, Victor Dobrovolsky, Polina Njatko, Kateryna Osmylovska, Yevhen Ponomarenko, Petro Sergienko, Mykola Yakovchenko, Mykola Bratersky, Oleksandr Romanenko and others. The following masterpieces of the national and world classics were produced: "The Marriage of Figaro" by Beaumarchais, "Adventures of the Bright Soldier Schweik" by Jaroslav Hašek, "Vanity" by I. Karpenko-Kariy, "Don Carlos" by Friedrich Schiller, "Boris Godunov" by Alexander Pushkin.

From the first half of the 1930s, the theater, like a number of other groups, has almost completely switched to propaganda plays of Soviet themes. There was only one classical play among 13 productions staged in 1930–34. Feeling that the actors and theater could lose what had been developed over the years, in 1933 Hnat Yura turned to one of the most beloved productions that saved the theater during hard times, "The Marriage of Figaro". He played the part of Figaro. Frequently, neglecting his own interests and desires as a director, trying to expand the creative range of the theater, Yura invited other directors to produce plays: in 1937, Boris Sushkevich produced the tragedy "Boris Godunov" by Pushkin; in 1939, V. Vilner staged "The Last Victim" by Alexander Ostrovsky. In the season of the 20th anniversary of the theater foundation, Yura produced the legendary "Stolen Happiness" by I. Franko. In 1946, Konstantin Khokhlov revealed the drama of Anton Chekhov to the Ukrainian theater, staging "The Cherry Orchard" at Franko Theater.

The classics kept on saving the theater from degradation: Yura was working on updated versions of "Martin Borulli", "Auditor", "Shvejk", which had been his mascot since 1928. The monument in the park near the theater immortalizes Gnat Yura's Svejk.

1940 – the theater received the academic title.

1941-1944 – the company worked, while being evacuated to Semipalatinsk and Tashkent.

B. Nord, B. Tyagn, B. Balaban, V. Vasiliev, M. Krushelnytsky, V. Ivchenko, V. Gakkebusch worked at the theater in the postwar period; V. Ogloblin, V. Krainichenko, V. Kharchenko – since the 1950s; D. Aleksidze, V. Sklyarenko, D. Lyzogub, B. Meshkis, O. Barseghyan, D. Tchaikovsky, P. Morozenko, S. Korkoshko – since the 1960s, S. Smiyan and others – since the 1970s. Scenography and music solutions of the plays have traditionally been and remain a strong point of the creative work of Franko Theater. These are the works of the artists: M. Drak, V. Mellear, A. Petrytsky, D. Leader, A. Aleksandrovich-Dochevsky (the main artist of the theater), as well as music by composers: N. Pruslin, Y. Mateus, I. Shamo, I. Post, L. Revutsky, O. Bilash, M. Skoryk and others.

In 1978–2001, the theater was headed by Serhiy Danchenko. At that time, Bohdan Stupka, Bohdan Benyuk, Anatoliy Khostikoyev, Natalya Sumska, Larysa Kadyrova, Les Zadneprovsky, Alexei Bogdanovich, Iryna Doroshenko Vasiliy Mazur, Lyudmila Smorodina, Stanislav Stankevich, Les Serdyuk, Mikhail Kramar and many others were the cast of the theater. "Fear of risk leads to averaging out the art. this is a danger, the theater is a living organism, and nothing can be saved by beating about the bush. No manifests are needed, there should be performances. They are the only purpose and means of progress."

Serhiy Danchenko followed these words and achieved significant results. The first productions made people talk about the revival of the First Scene of Ukraine. Here he introduced the Ukrainian stage to the drama of Friedrich Dürrenmatt, G. Ibsen, introduced the moral and aesthetic circle of the Ukrainian theater to A. Chekhov (in 1980, the performance "Uncle Vanya" was awarded the State Prize of the USSR), repeatedly appealed to the drama of William Shakespeare, found proper, nervously penetrating forms of stage reading of Mykola Khvylovy's prose. He captured people with the national theater element of Ivan Kotliarevsky's "Eneida". The story of Tevye the Milkman, with which the whole world was familiar, acquired the status of a cosmic narrative about the search for the harmony of being (Tevye-Tevel by Sholem Aleichem 1993 – Taras Shevchenko National Prize of Ukraine).

Since the early 1990s, the theater has been actively putting its work in the European cultural context – it tours in Germany, Austria, Greece, Italy, Poland, the United States, where the work of the Franko Theater artists is appreciated as it's supposed to be.

Since 1992 – Myhailo Zakharevich has been the CEO of the Theater.

The decree of the President of Ukraine dated October 11, 1994, granted the status of the National Theater.

From the end of 2001 to 2012 the theater was headed by Hero and People's Artist of Ukraine Bogdan Stupka. Continuing and developing the traditions estqablished by the glorious predecessors – the founder of the theater G. Yura and the long-term creative fellow S. Danchenko – Bohdan Stupka introduced the names, which were unusual for Ukraine, to the repertoire, including the classics of Ukrainian literature by G. Skovoroda ("The Primer of the World"), G. Konysky ("Tragedo Comedy about the Resurrection of the Dead"); introduced the ancient Indian culture ("Shyakundala" by Kalidasa), the work of the Polish classic of the 20th century S. Vitkevich ("Mom, or Unspecified Creation ..."); brought Sophocles and Fyodor Dostoevsky ("Oedipus Rex" "The Brothers Karamazov") back on stage. In an effort to expand the artistic palette of Franko Theater, Stupka invited to stage directors with completely opposite artistic principles. Directors from Russia, Poland, Georgia, and Canada co-operated with the theater.

The theater becomes a full member of the International Theater Institute, thus contributing to the popularization of Ukrainian theatrical art in the world.

"And today we have no moral right to cross out, erase from memory everything created by the luminaries of this scene, but on the contrary, we must accomplish what they didn’t. The future of our theater in 40, 50, 100 years depends on us, on everyone. The way we will be remembered by the coming generation." B. Stupka

On March 19, 2012, the Chamber Scene, named after Sergyi Danchenko, was opened. On October 19, 2013, the monument of the Artist was erected (Volodymyr and Andriy Chepeliki were the sculptors), near the Chamber Scene.

During the period from 2012 to 2017, the artistic director of the theater was Stanislav Moiseyev.

Today, the general director and artistic director of the theater is Myhailo Zakharevich (since 2018), the principal director is Dmutro Bogomazov (since 2017). Directors Petro Ilchenko, Yuriy Odinoky, Andriy Prykhodko, Dmitry Chiropyuk, David Petrosyan work full-time at the theater.

Since 2004, the International Theater Festival of Women's Mono Performances "Maria" has been held annually in the theater's space.

The theater is located in a park area next to the Bankova Street.

== Selected repertoire ==
1920 — "Sin" by V. Vinnichenko; directed by G. Yura. The first performance of the theater in Vinnytsia in

1926 — "Viy" by N. Gogol. The first performance on the stage of the former theater "Solovtsov" (Kiev)

1934 — "Platon Krechet" by A. Korneychuk; director K. Koshevsky

1940 — "In the Steppes of Ukraine" by A. Korneychuk; directed by G. Yura

1942 — "Nazar Stodolya" by T. Shevchenko; directed by A. Buchma. The first production of the play in the theater in Semipalatinsk during the war and the evacuation

1942 — "Natalka-Poltavka" by I. Kotlyarevsky; directed by A. Buchma. Staged in Semipalatinsk during the war and the evacuation of

1946 — "The Cherry Orchard" by A. Chekhov; directed by K. Khokhlov

1961 — "The Pharaohs" by A. Kolomiyets; directed by I. Kaznadiy. The play was held 2000 times with full houses

1965 — "Antigone" by Sophocles; directed by D. Alexidze

1978 — "Macbeth" by W. Shakespeare; director S. Smeyan

1979 — "Stolen Happiness" by I. Franko; director S. Danchenko

1989 — "Tevye-Tevel" by G. Gorin; directed by S. Danchenko, D. Chiripyuk

1999 — "Schweik" by J. Hasek; directed by Miroslav Grinishin, A. Zholdak-Tobilevich

1999 — "Kin IV" by G. Gorin; directed by A. Hostikoyev

2003 — Sophocles ' Oedipus Rex; directed by R. Sturua

2004 — "The Brothers Karamazov" by F. Dostoevsky; director Yu. Lonely

2007 — "The Kaidashev family" by I. Nechuy-Levitsky; directed by P. Ilchenko

2007 — "The Lion and the Lioness" by Irena Koval; directed by S. Moiseev

2010 — "The Greek Zorba" by N. Kazantzakis; director V. Malakhov

2014 — "The Living Corpse" by L. Tolstoy; director Roman Marholia

== Artistic directors ==
- Hnat Yura - 1920–1964
- Marian Krushelnitsky - 1954–1956
- Vasyl Kharchenko - 1956–1957
- Volodymyr Sklyarenko – 1962
- Yevhen Ponomarenko - Chairman of the Editorial Board - 1965–1966
- Dmitry Aleksidze - 1966–1969
- Sergey Smiyan - 1970–1978
- Serhiy Danchenko - 1978–2001
- Bohdan Stupka - 2001–2012
- Stanislav Moiseyev - 2012–2017
- Myhailo Zakharevich - 2018–2024
- Yevhen Nyshchuk - since 2024

== Repertoire and structure ==
Every theater has a play that serves as its business card. At the Franco Theater, these are Ivan Kotlyarevsky's "Aeneid", Ivan Franko's "Stolen Happiness", and Friedrich Dürrenmatt's "Visit to the Old Lady". Without them, it is difficult to imagine the modern repertoire of the institution. In general, one of the main tasks of the Franko theater is to work with the works of classics: Taras Shevchenko ("Gaydamaki"), Ivan Kotlyarevsky ("Natalka-Poltavka", "Moskal-charivnik"), Lesya Ukrainka ("Stone Master", "Forest Song") and others. However, it was from his stage that Ukrainian viewers were introduced to World Classics: "King Lear", "A Lot of Noise in Vain" and "Macbeth" by William Shakespeare, "Boris Godunov" by Alexander Pushkin, "The Philistine nobleman" by Molière, "Oedipus Tsar" by Sophocles, "Uncle Vanya" and "The Cherry Orchard" by Anton Chekhov.

The performances of recent years are as follows: "Kaidash’s family" by I.Nechoyu-Levytsky, "On Sunday morning the potion was digging", "Earth" by O.Kobilyanska and "Crossroads" by I.Franko, "Idiot" by F. Dostoevsky, "Coriolan", "The Taming of the Stomach" and "Richard III" by William Shakespeare, "Frederick or the Boulevard of Crimes" by E. Shmitt, "Greek Zorba" by N. Kazandzakis, Beaumarchais "The Marriage of Figaro", "The Anthem of Democratic Youth" S. Zadana, A. Chekhov's "Seagull", "Morituri te salutant" based on Stefanik's novels, Peter Kwilter's "The incomparable", and Gregory Horin's "Kean IV ".

Currently, the repertoire of the Franko theater includes about 40 performances.

The creative team of the theater also includes a ballet company, choir and orchestra.

Among the theatre directors who have staged productions at the Ivan Franko National Academic Drama Theater are Hnat Jura, Borys Balaban, Valery Vasylyev, Maryan Krushelnytsky, Charlotte Varshaver, Volodymyr Ohloblin, Danchenko, Andriy Zholdak, Dmytro Bohomazov, Dmytro Cherepiuk, Yuriy Odynoky, Petro Ilchenko, Stanislav Moiseyev, David Petrosyan, Ivan Uryvsky, Taras Zhyrko, Roman Markholia, Valentín Kozmenko-Delinde, Diana Stein, Andriy Mai, Kateryna Stepankova, Serhiy Masloboishykov, Avtandil Varsemashvili, Tetyana Arkushenko, Jokubas Brazis, Brzhetyslav Rykhlik, and Thomas Mettler.

The theater troupe is located in Ukraine, the actors of the theater are artists such as Vasily Basha, Bohdan Benyuk, Alexey Bogdanovich, Anatoly Gnatyuk, Iryna Doroshenko, Alexander Zadneprovsky, Vladimir Kolyada, Polina Lazova, Vasily Mazur, Peter Panchuk, Alexey Petukhov, Dmitry Rybalevsky, Lyudmila Smorodina, Ostap Stupka, Natalia Sumskaya, Anatoly Khostikoev, Galina Yablonskaya.

== Charitable activities ==
Following the beginning of the full-scale Russian invasion of Ukraine in February 2022, the theater has participated in charitable projects supporting the Ukrainian Defense Forces.

In March 2024, the theater began cooperating with the charitable foundation Come Back Alive. During the first charity performance of ''The Witch of Konotop'', UAH 2.349 million (approximately US$60,800) was raised. The funds were used to support the needs of the Defence Forces of Ukraine.

In July 2026, the theater, in cooperation with the Come Back Alive charity, announced that UAH 1.5 million (approximately US$33,000) had been raised to purchase 100 Starlink terminals for personnel of the 57th Separate Motorized Infantry Brigade named after Koshovyi Otaman Kost Hordiienko.
