= Maria Zankovetska Theatre =

Theatre in Lviv, Ukraine

- Театр імені Марії Заньковецької
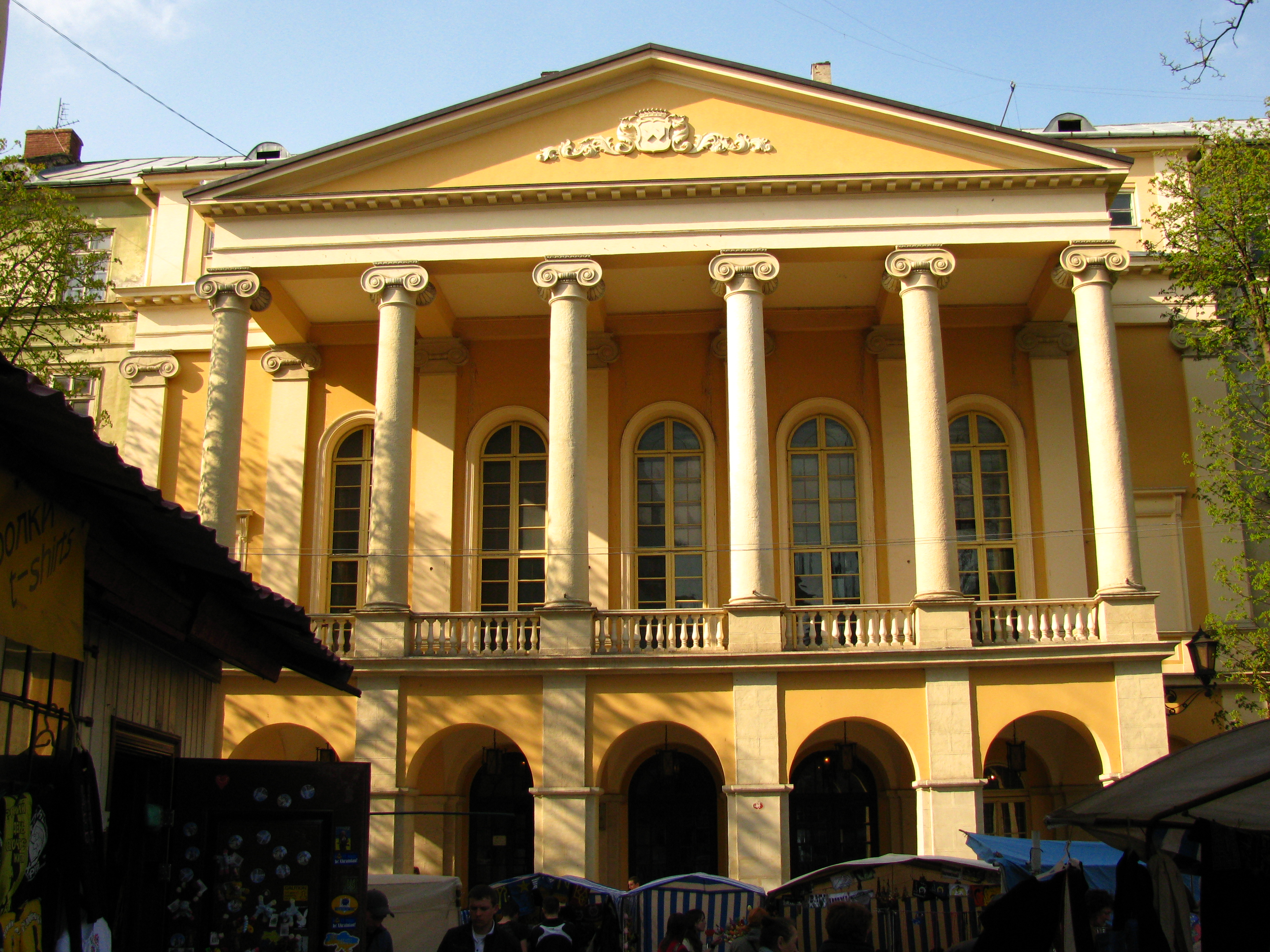
- Facade of the theater, 2008
- Former names: Teatr Skarbkowski (1842–1944)
- Alternative names: Zankovetska Drama Theater

General information
- Status: National Academic
- Architectural style: Neoclassical architecture
- Location: vulytsia Lesi Ukrainky, 1, Lviv, Ukraine
- Coordinates: 49°50′38″N 24°01′38″E
- Current tenants: Theatrical troupe
- Groundbreaking: 1832
- Construction started: 1837
- Completed: 1842
- Owner: Government of Ukraine
- Landlord: Ministry of Culture

Technical details
- Floor area: 95.45 m × 76.25 m (313 ft × 250 ft)

Design and construction
- Architects: Jan Salzmann and Ludwig Pichl

Other information
- Seating type: Theater
- Seating capacity: 1,460

Website
- Official website

Maria Zankovetska Theatre (Ukrainian: Національний академічний український драматичний театр імені Марії Заньковецької, Natsionalnyi akademichnyi ukrayinskyi dramatychnyi teatr imeni Mariyi Zankovetskoyi; Polish: Teatr Skarbkowski) is a drama theatre in the centre of Lviv, Ukraine, at the intersection of Lesya Ukrayinka Street and Prospekt Svobody. The building was erected in the mid 19th century, when it was the home of the Galician parliament, and was used as a theatre stage throughout the period until World War I.

== History ==
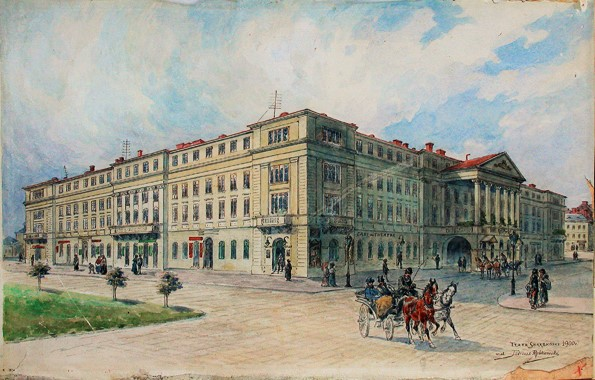
Skarbek Theater, Lwów, water-colour by T. Rybrovsky, 1900

The theatre was founded by Count Stanisław Marcin Skarbek (pl) (1780–1848) Abdank coat of arms, who as early as 1819 had applied for permission from the Austrian Imperial authorities to build it following the final Partition of Poland. Construction of the theatre’s neoclassical building began in 1837, the project was designed by architects Jan Salzmann and Ludwig Pichl. The complex was built in the location of bastions, which surrounded the Lower Castle and its foundation was made of 16,000 oak logs. In 1842 it was the third biggest building of Central Europe. Apart from the theatre itself, the complex also included apartments, for such famous personalities as Artur Grottger and Juliusz Kossak. On the opening day, March 28, 1842, a Franz Grillparzer play in the German language was presented, and on the next day, Aleksander Fredro's play Śluby panieńskie was presented, this time in Polish.

In initial years, plays both in Polish and German were presented, and this lasted until 1871, when all German plays were withdrawn and the theatre became a Polish-language only. In 1872, operas were also presented, which made Skarbek Theatre the sole opera scene in Galicia.

In late years of the 19th century, the complex became insufficient, and in 1900, it was augmented by a brand new building of the Grand Theatre. Skarbek Theatre was turned into a philharmonic, then into a cinema. Currently, it is home of the Ukrainian Dramatic Theatre of Maria Zankovetska. On May 18, 2008, celebrations of the 50th anniversary of the Polish People's Theatre of Lviv took place in the complex, with performance of a play by Marian Hemar.
