= Oleksandr Dovzhenko State Prize =

Ukrainian film award

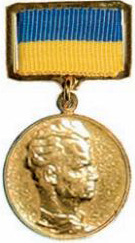
- Native name: Державна премія України імені Олександра Довженка
- Type: State prize
- Awarded for: Outstanding contributions to the development of Ukrainian cinema
- Sponsored by: Ministry of Finance
- Country: Ukraine
- Presented by: President
- Rewards: Diploma, medal, and cash prize (Note: In the first years after the prize's establishment, the cash reward was denominated in Russian rubles and set at 150 times the national minimum wage. In the awarding presidential decrees, this amount was indicated to be 100 million ₽ in 1995 and 250 million ₽ in 1996; for 1998, a separate presidential decree was issued that denominated the award in Ukrainian hryvnia for the first time with the amount ₴15,000. Since the 1998 award, all monetary prizes have been denominated in hryvnias, with the award's monetary quantity having generally increased in the years since, from a typical award amount of ₴50,000 in the early 2000s, ₴100,000 in the late 2000s and early 2010s, and ₴200,000 since the late 2010s. Following the enactment of an amendment to the award's rules on 4 January 1999, the minimum wage provision has also been replaced, with the amount of the cash prize instead having since been determined annually by the president, with each year's awarding decree designating the amount of the reward, although the reward remains funded by the Ministry of Finance. In years with multiple laureates, each awardee receives a diploma and medal while the total amount of the monetary reward is divided equally. For posthumous awardees, the rewards are given to the families of the laureates.)
- First award: 1995

Highlights
- Total: 45 (Note: For 2010, the award committee selected director Rollan Serhiyenko, cinematographer Eduard Timlin, and composer Volodymyr Huba as that year's laureates for their film Declaration of Love; however, because the presidential decree on awarding the prize was not signed by the president as required by the prize's rules, the award was not officially conferred. There was no formal reason given for the lack of the decree and withholding of the prize, although multiple Ukrainian news outlets have attributed it to contentions amongst officials of then-President Viktor Yanukovych's administration, who had also deferred the awarding of 2010's State Prize of Ukraine in Science and Technology.)
- Total awarded posthumously: 3 (Note: The three laureates awarded posthumously are actor Oleg Borisov, scriptwriter and director-producer Viktor Ivanov, and theater and film actor Bohdan Stupka.)

The Oleksandr Dovzhenko State Prize of Ukraine (Ukrainian: Державна премія України імені Олександра Довженка, romanized: Deržavna premija Ukrajiny imeni Oleksandra Dovženka) is a state award honoring individuals who have made outstanding contributions to the development of Ukrainian cinema. It is named after acclaimed Soviet Ukrainian film director and screenwriter Oleksandr Dovzhenko, who was among the world's top filmmakers and a major figure of the Soviet film industry. The award was established on 10 September 1994 by Ukrainian President Leonid Kuchma to commemorate the 100th anniversary of Dovzhenko's birth. Award decisions are made by the Committee for the Oleksandr Dovzhenko State Prize of Ukraine—a group of eleven leading figures in the country's cinema (Note: The award's first committee was established on 12 December 1994 and included various prominent contributors to Ukrainian cinema, ranging from movie directors and film critics to writers and union representatives. Since the inaugural committee's establishment, there have been many individual committee members who have become laureates of the award before, during, or after their committee service, including Mykola Mashchenko, Serhiy Trymbach, Yuri Ilyenko, Oleksandr Koval, Mykhailo Illienko, Kira Muratova, Oles Sanin, and Viacheslav Kryshtofovych. Although each committee iteration as a whole is limited to two four-year terms by the award's rules, there have been a number of individual committee members who have served beyond eight years after being added into new committees, notably with Koval and Muratova, who both served from 1999 to 2013 as part of two different committees. In addition, some individual members have previously also left their committees prior to the completion of their committee's term, such as with inaugural committee members Mykola Vinhranovsky and Ivan Drach, who both requested and subsequently were dismissed from the committee on 2 August 1996, less than two years after the start of their committee's term.) appointed by either the government of Ukraine or the Committee's chair. Committee members serve on a voluntary basis to review prize submissions, identify exceptional works of Ukrainian cinema, and select the prize's recipient(s). (Note: In addition to their work in accepting and reviewing submissions before selecting the prize's final winner(s), the Committee also organizes and carries out an official awards ceremony, with technical assistance from the Ministry of Culture. Throughout their work, all committee members participate on a fully voluntary basis and receive no compensation for their service. In the first decades after the award's establishment, all appointments and dismissals of the committee's members was done through official legislation passed by the Ukrainian government. Following the enactment of an amendment to the award's rules on 15 February 2006, the committee's chair was also given the ability to make changes to the committee's membership if deemed necessary.) Their selection is sent to the Ukrainian president, who officially grants the award and designates its cash amount by 10 September (Note: Although the prize rules require the award to be granted by 10 September, years with the award given late remain official, with the awarding decrees for 2001, 2003, 2005, 2025, and 2026 having been issued past the date.) through a presidential decree. As a state award, the prize is the highest national recognition for cinema in Ukraine.

Any individual or creative team is eligible for the prize, with there being no nationality restrictions. For teams, the award submission cannot exceed five people and must comprise the group's most important contributors. Individuals may receive the prize more than once, provided that at least five years have passed since their last award and that they have made new outstanding achievements in cinematography since then. A person also cannot have nominations for two or more works open at the same time. (Note: Prize eligibility is also prohibited for projects that previously were nominated for or won the Shevchenko National Prize, the highest state award for culture in Ukraine, although Shevchenko prize laureates are still eligible for the prize provided that they accomplish new outstanding achievements for consideration.) Submissions are made by various institutions and organizations (Note: Organizations eligible to submit works for the award include the "Ministry of Culture, creative unions, film, television, and video studios, art institutions and scientific institutions, public organizations, and editorial offices of newspapers and magazines.") to the award committee annually by 1 June, after which the committee votes (Note: Each voting session requires a quorum of two-thirds of the committee's members for the results to be valid. Voting is held using a secret ballot, with a simple majority of committee votes needed to advance a submission for further consideration and a minimum of three-fourths of votes needed to select the final winner. The narrowed list of contenders for additional consideration is determined by 10 June, after which voting on determining the final awardee begins. This shortlist for further voting is also publicized by the committee, sometime at least two months before the planned awarding of the prize, and includes the list of accepted nominations and the organizations that proposed them. Throughout the process, committee members who are involved or connected to a submission are prohibited from participating in the voting.) on narrowing down the best works and ultimately selecting the final awardee(s) by 15 August, when the president receives the committee's selection. Laureates of the prize receive three rewards: a diploma, medal, and cash prize.

Since the prize was first awarded in 1995, 45 individuals have been officially given the prize, including three who were awarded posthumously. Two additional individuals, director Rollan Serhiyenko and cinematographer Eduard Timlin, were selected by the award committee for the prize in 2010 (marked with italics in the table below) together with composer Volodymyr Huba for their film Declaration of Love but were not officially awarded the prize due to the required presidential decree not being signed. For Huba, he was later officially given the award as the sole laureate for 2014 in recognition of his overall career and contributions to Ukrainian cinema. No individual has yet officially received the prize more than once, although Huba remains the sole person to have won the competition (i.e. be selected by the award committee) twice: in 2014 and in 2010's unawarded prize. In addition to 2010, there have been six years in which the prize was not awarded: 1997, 2000, 2013, 2018, 2020, and 2023. (Note: For unawarded years, the award committee voted in favor of not granted the prize for 2013, while in 2018, the committee could not form sufficient consensus on selecting the prizewinner(s); causes for the other years without laureates are not reported.)

== List of laureates ==
† Posthumous award

Oleksandr Dovzhenko State Prize laureates
Year	Laureate	Profession/honorifics (Note: The profession and honorifics of each laureate as listed on the awarding presidential decree is shown. For laureates awarded as part of collaborative projects, the individual's role or contribution to the project as indicated by the decree is shown.)	Rationale	Refs.
1995	Boryslav Brondukov	actor	for his outstanding contribution to the development of cinematography	
1996	Nataliya Andriychenko	director and producer	for a significant contribution to the development of domestic cinema	
1997	No award given			
1998	Mykola Zaseev-Rudenko	director-producer	for their outstanding creative contribution to the creation of the feature film Moskal-Charivnyk	
1998	Oleksandr Chornyi	cinematographer	for their outstanding creative contribution to the creation of the feature film Moskal-Charivnyk	
1998	Bohdan Beniuk	actor	for their outstanding creative contribution to the creation of the feature film Moskal-Charivnyk	
1998	Oleksandr Bondarenko	actor	for their outstanding creative contribution to the creation of the feature film Moskal-Charivnyk	
1998	Ruslana Pysanka	actress	for their outstanding creative contribution to the creation of the feature film Moskal-Charivnyk	
1999	Viktor Ivanov†	scriptwriter and director-producer	for their outstanding creative contribution to the creation of the feature film Chasing Two Hares	
1999	Vadym Illienko	cinematographer-producer	for their outstanding creative contribution to the creation of the feature film Chasing Two Hares	
1999	Oleg Borisov†	actor	for their outstanding creative contribution to the creation of the feature film Chasing Two Hares	
1999	Marharyta Krynytsyna	actress	for their outstanding creative contribution to the creation of the feature film Chasing Two Hares	
1999	Nataliya Naum	actress	for their outstanding creative contribution to the creation of the feature film Chasing Two Hares	
2000	No award given			
2001	Leonid Osyka	director	for his personal creative contribution to the development of domestic cinema	
2002	Kira Muratova	director	for a significant contribution to the development of domestic cinema	
2003	Konstantin Stepankov	People's Artist of the USSR	for his great contribution to the development of domestic cinema	
2004	Oles Sanin	scriptwriter and director-producer	for their outstanding creative contribution to the creation of the feature film Mamay	
2004	Serhiy Mykhalchuk	cinematographer	for their outstanding creative contribution to the creation of the feature film Mamay	
2004	Alla Zahaikevych	composer	for their outstanding creative contribution to the creation of the feature film Mamay	
2004	Viktoriia Spesivtseva	actress	for their outstanding creative contribution to the creation of the feature film Mamay	
2004	Andriy Bilous	actor	for their outstanding creative contribution to the creation of the feature film Mamay	
2005	Yuri Ilyenko	film director, cinematographer, People's Artist of Ukraine	for his outstanding contribution to the development of domestic cinema	
2006	Oleksandr Koval	cinematographer, film director, People's Artist of Ukraine, Corresponding Member of the Academy of Arts of Ukraine	for his outstanding contribution to the development of domestic cinema	
2007	Mykhailo Illienko	film director, actor, screenwriter, Honored Artist of Ukraine, Corresponding Member of the Academy of Arts of Ukraine	for his outstanding contribution to the development of Ukrainian cinema	
2008	Serhiy Trymbach	film scholar, film critic, author of the book Oleksandr Dovzhenko: The Death of the Gods. Identification of the Author in the National Time and Space	for his outstanding contribution to the development of Ukrainian cinema	
2009	Pavlo Faryniuk	film director, screenwriter, Honored Artist of Ukraine	for his outstanding contribution to the development of Ukrainian cinema	
2010	Rollan Serhiyenko	director	for the creation of the film Declaration of Love	
2010	Eduard Timlin	cinematographer	for the creation of the film Declaration of Love	
2010	Volodymyr Huba	composer	for the creation of the film Declaration of Love	
2011	Hryhoriy Kohan	film director, Honored Artist of Ukraine, People's Artist of Ukraine	for their outstanding contribution to the development of Ukrainian cinema	
2011	Mykola Mashchenko	film director, laureate of the Taras Shevchenko National Prize of Ukraine, academician of the National Academy of Arts of Ukraine, People's Artist of Ukraine	for their outstanding contribution to the development of Ukrainian cinema	
2012	Bohdan Stupka†	theater and film actor, Hero of Ukraine, People's Artist of Ukraine, laureate of the Taras Shevchenko National Prize of Ukraine, academician of the National Academy of Arts of Ukraine	for his outstanding contribution to the development of Ukrainian cinema	
2013	At the award committee's meeting on 24 July 2013, it was decided to consider the prize unawarded for 2013.			
2014	Volodymyr Huba	composer, People's Artist of Ukraine, laureate of the Mykola Lysenko Prize, member of the National Union of Composers of Ukraine and the National Union of Cinematographers of Ukraine	for his outstanding contribution to the development of Ukrainian cinematography	
2015	Myroslav Slaboshpytskyi	author of the script, director and producer	creators of the full-length feature film The Tribe […] for their outstanding contribution to the development of Ukrainian cinema	
2015	Valentyn Vasyanovych	director of photography	creators of the full-length feature film The Tribe […] for their outstanding contribution to the development of Ukrainian cinema	
2016	Viktor Olender	film director of the documentary historical and biographical film project Konstantyn Stepankov. Memories after Life	for his outstanding contribution to the development of Ukrainian cinema	
2017	Ada Rohovtseva	People's Artist of Ukraine, laureate of the Taras Shevchenko National Prize of Ukraine, Hero of Ukraine	for her outstanding contribution to the development of Ukrainian cinema	
2018	In the award committee's final vote held on 24 July 2018, none of the submissions received enough votes to be awarded the prize.			
2019	Sergei Loznitsa	film director	for the creation of the feature-length film Donbass (2018)	
2020	No award given			
2021	Natalya Vorozhbyt	film director and screenwriter	for her outstanding contribution to the development of Ukrainian cinema	
2022	Viacheslav Kryshtofovych	film director	for his outstanding contribution to the development of Ukrainian cinema	
2023	No award given			
2024	Roman Balayan	film director and screenwriter	for his outstanding contribution to the development of Ukrainian cinema	
2025	Zhanna Ozirnia	director and screenwriter	for the creation of the full-length feature film Honeymoon	
2025	Roman Lutskyi	actor	for the creation of the full-length feature film Honeymoon	
2025	Iryna Nirsh	actress	for the creation of the full-length feature film Honeymoon	
2026	Olha Zhurba	director	for the creation of the full-length documentary film Songs of Slow Burning Earth	
2026	Mykhailo Liubarskyi	camera operator	for the creation of the full-length documentary film Songs of Slow Burning Earth	
2026	Volodymyr Usyk	camera operator	for the creation of the full-length documentary film Songs of Slow Burning Earth	
2026	Viacheslav Tsvietkov	camera operator	for the creation of the full-length documentary film Songs of Slow Burning Earth	
2026	Yaroslav Tatarchenko	composer	for the creation of the full-length documentary film Songs of Slow Burning Earth	

== See also ==
- List of Ukrainian State Prizes
- List of film awards
