= Viacheslav Kryshtofovych =

Ukrainian film director and actor (1947–2025)

- В'ячеслав Криштофович
- Born: 26 October 1947; Kyiv, Ukrainian SSR, USSR
- Died: 6 December 2025 (aged 78); Kyiv, Ukraine
- Education: Kyiv National I. K. Karpenko-Kary Theatre, Cinema and Television University
- Occupations: Film director and actor
- Years active: 1968–2019
- Organization: Director of Dovzhenko Film Studios
- Notable work: Adam's Rib; A Friend of the Deceased
- Awards: see here

Viacheslav Syhyzmundovych Kryshtofovych (Ukrainian: В'ячеслав Сигизмундович Криштофович; 26 October 1947 – 6 December 2025) was a Ukrainian film director and actor, the recipient of the Honored Art Worker of Ukraine, Oleksandr Dovzhenko State Prize and the Order of Merit.

== Biography and Career ==
Born on 26 October 1947, in the Ukrainian city of Kyiv. His father, Sigizmund Boleslavovich Kryshtofovych (1920—1995), was an actor (and troupe leader) at the Lesya Ukrainka National Academic Theater; his mother was a film engineer.

In 1971 he obtained his degree from the department of directors of film at the Kyiv National I. K. Karpenko-Kary Theatre, Cinema and Television University, from the Volodymyr Denysenko workshop.

From 1970, Kryshtofovych was a director at the Dovzhenko Film Studios. Kryshtofovych appeared as a guest in the comedy Женщины шутят всерьёз in 1981. He directed Two Hussars, a historical melodrama, in 1984. He directed a melodrama in 1986 titled A Lonely Woman Wants to Meet.

In 1991, he begain teaching at Kyiv National I. K. Karpenko-Kary Theatre, Cinema and Television University.

In 1996, he became an academician at the National Academy of Arts of Ukraine.

Kryshtofovych died on 6 December 2025, at the age of 78.

== Filmography ==
Films that Kryshtofovych directed during his career:

- 1975 — Волны Чёрного моря
- 1975 — Ральф, здравствуй!
- 1977 — Перед экзаменом
- 1979 — Своё счастье
- 1980 — Мелочи жизни
- 1984 — Два гусара
- 1985 — Володя большой, Володя маленький
- 1986 — Lonely Woman Seeks Life Companion
- 1988 — Автопортрет неизвестного
- 1990 — Adam's Rib
- 1992 — Женщина в море
- 1997 — A Friend of the Deceased
- 2002 — Под крышами большого города
- 2002 — Право на защиту
- 2004 — Я тебя люблю
- 2005 — Косвенные улики
- 2005 — Седьмое небо
- 2006 — Первое правило королевы
- 2007 — Саквояж со светлым будущим
- 2007 — Дом-фантом в приданое
- 2008 — Ой, мамочки...
- 2008 — Тормозной путь
- 2008 — Завещание ночи
- 2011 — О нём
- 2012 — Менты. Тайны большого города
- 2020 — Forebodings

== Awards and recognitions ==
At the 1997 Listapad International Film Festival in Minsk, Kryshtofovych was awarded a special award and certificate for the crime drama Приятель покойника due to its cohesive artistic vision. For his work on Приятель покойника, he was awarded the 1998 Golden Aries Award for Best Director. He received the Oleksandr Dovzhenko State Prize from President Volodymyr Zelenskyy in 2022 for his contributions to the growth of Ukrainian cinema. Kryshtofovych was given the following membership and awards:

- Order of Merit Third Class (2020)
- Oleksandr Dovzhenko State Prize (2022)
- Honored Art Worker of Ukraine (2000)
- Member of the Academy of Arts of Ukraine (2017)
- Member of the Ukrainian Association of Cinematographers

Award	Year	Category	Nominated work	Result
Listapad International Film Festival	1997	Special award and certificate	Приятель покойника	Won
Golden Aries Award	1998	Best Director	Приятель покойника	Won
