= Three Musketeers (2004 musical) =

2004 Ukrainian-Russian musical film starring Volodymyr Zelenskyy

- Theatrical release poster
- Directed by: Tinatin (Tina) Barkalay
- Written by: Volodymyr Zelenskyy; Boris Shefir; Serhiy Shefir
- Based on: The Three Musketeers by Alexandre Dumas
- Produced by: Alexey Goncharenko; Vladislav Ryashin; Ella Boblenyuk; Gennady Hochstein
- Starring: Volodymyr Zelenskyy; Anna Ardova; Ruslana Pysanka; Alyona Sviridova; Andriy Danylko
- Cinematography: Vyacheslav Lazarev
- Production companies: "Melorama Production" commissioned by FSUE SCC TV Channel "Russia-1" and STC "Inter"
- Release date: December 31, 2004
- Running time: 99 minutes
- Countries: Russia, Ukraine
- Language: Russian

Three Musketeers (Russian: Три мушкетера, romanized: Tri mušketera) is a Russian-Ukrainian New Year's musical film starring Volodymyr Zelenskyy, Anna Ardova, Ruslana Pysanka and Alyona Sviridova. It is based on the novel of the same name by Alexandre Dumas. The comedy was released on December 31, 2004, on Russia-1 (Russia) and Inter (Ukraine).

== Plot ==
A young and determined d'Artagnan goes to Paris to pursue a career as a musketeer in the Royal Regiment. There he meets Athos, Portos and Aramis, with whom he later forms a warm friendship. Captain of the Women's Regiment De Treville, of course, in such an environment weaves intrigue and gossip. In the French capital d'Artagnan finds his first love, Constance Bonassier. Queen Anne of Austria constantly presses King Louis XIII of France to lead a healthy lifestyle, forcing him to do one or another sport. The King, being of a poetic nature who prefers a bohemian way of life, opposes this in every possible way. The Queen then embarks on an affair with Lord Buckingham. The main enemy of all the heroes is the insidious Cardinal Madame Richelieu.

The authors of this new version of "The Three Musketeers" dared to tell a classic story and cast Dumas in a completely unexpected way. The three musketeers were made women, and the musketeer regiment was made female. D'Artagnan (Volodymyr Zelenskyy) no longer associates with the musketeers' male friendship, but rather the relationship of older sisters and mentors.

== Cast ==
Role	Actor
d'Artagnan	Volodymyr Zelenskyy
Athos	Alyona Sviridova
Portos	Ruslana Pysanka
Aramis	Anna Ardova
Queen Anne of Austria	Amalia Mordvinova
King Louis XIII	Yuriy Stoyanov
Madame Richelieu	Andriy Danylko
Captain De Treville	Armen Dzhigarkhanyan
Constance Bonassier	Yulia Nachalova
La Chegne	Stanislav Sadalsky
Duke of Buckingham	Ville Juhana Haapasalo
The Musketeer Lady	Neonila Biletska
Molby, assistant to the Duke of Buckingham	Alexey Vertinsky
Cardinal's Guard	Yuri Krapov
Cardinal's Guard	Sergey Kazanin
Cardinal's Guard	Denis Manzhosov
Cardinal's Guard	Oleksandr Pikalov
Tavern owner	Alexander Getmanski
Singer in the square	Jasmin
Singer in the square	Tatiana Nedelska
Father of d'Artagnan	Vladimir Etush

== Songs ==
New songs were specially written for the musical. The composers were Maxim Dunaevsky, Egor Olesov, Ivan Rozin and Vladimir Kripak.

Title	Artist
"Song of the Buskers"	Jasmine & Tatiana Nedelskaya
"Madame Richelieu's Song"	Andriy Danylko
"The King's Song"	Yuri Stoyanov & Amalia Mordvinova
"Song of Constance"	Julia Nachalova
"Ah, the Temptations of Paris"	Alyona Sviridova & Ruslana Pisanka & Anna Ardova
"Success will come"	Volodymyr Zelenskyy

== Production ==
"Three Musketeers" is a whole musical film, not individual reruns with music videos. Director Tina Barkalaya described the musical as "an adult fairy tale with a child's mood." "We want this musical story to go beyond the New Year's project and become a film that viewers would be happy to watch", she also said.
