= The Keys of Skies =

1964 film by Viktor Ivanov

- Russian: Ключи от неба
- Directed by: Viktor Ivanov
- Written by: Ivan Stadnyuk
- Starring: Alexander Lenkov; Valeriy Bessarab; Zoya Vikhoryeva; Natalya Surovegina; Genrikh Ostashevsky
- Cinematography: Mikhail Ivanov
- Edited by: N. Yatsenko
- Music by: Vadim Gomolyaka
- Release date: 1964
- Running time: 78 minute
- Country: Soviet Union
- Language: Russian

The Keys of Skies (Russian: Ключи от неба) is a 1964 Soviet romantic comedy film directed by Viktor Ivanov.

== Plot ==
In the center of the plot air defence missile regiment lieutenant Kirillov, rookie radio amateur Lagoda, a girl named Polina and doctor Anna, who are quarreling over trifles, reconcile and decide to get married.

== Cast ==
- Alexander Lenkov as Semyon Lagoda (as A. Lenkov)
- Valeriy Bessarab as Ivan Kirillov (as V. Bessarab)
- Zoya Vikhoryeva as Polina Repyakh (as Z. Vikhoryeva)
- Natalya Surovegina as Anya Petrenko (as N. Surovegina)
- Genrikh Ostashevsky as polkovnik Aleksandr Andreyev (as G. Ostashevskiy)
- Aleksandr Gai as mayor Olenin (as A. Gay)
- Andrey Gonchar as Vasiliy Filin (as A. Gonchar)
- Vyacheslav Voronin as Lieutenant Samsonov
- Vladimir Volkov as Lorry Driver
- V. Gavronskiy as Sergeant Major
- Maria Kapnist as lab worker (uncredited)
