= Viktor Ivanov (film director) =

Soviet film director (1909–1981)

- Віктор Іванов
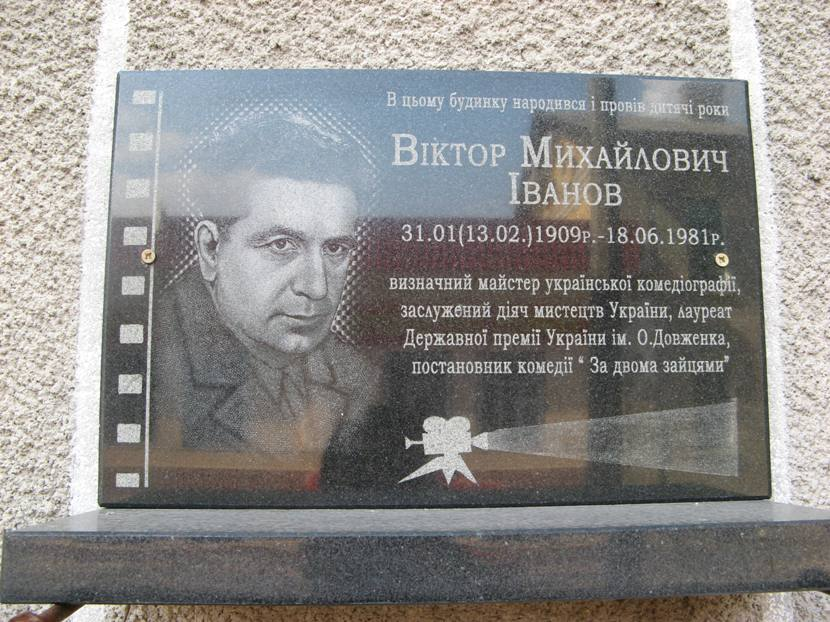
- Ivanov's memorial plaque in 2010
- Born: 31 January [O.S. 13 February] 1909; Kazatin, Berdichevsky Uyezd, Kiev Governorate, Russian Empire (now Koziatyn, Vinnytsia Oblast, Ukraine)
- Died: 18 June 1981 (aged 72); Kyiv, Ukrainian SSR, Soviet Union
- Burial place: Baikove Cemetery
- Education: Gerasimov Institute of Cinematography
- Occupation: Film director
- Years active: 1950–1981
- Political party: Communist Party of the Soviet Union
- Parents: Mykhailo Spyrydonovych (father); Tetiana Andriivna (mother)
- Awards: see here

Viktor Mykhailovych Ivanov (Ukrainian: Віктор Михайлович Іванов; 31 January [O.S. 13 February] 1909 – 18 June 1981) was a Ukrainian Soviet film director who is known as the creator of the comedy film Chasing Two Hares. He was referred to be a one in a million director by Alexander Dovzhenko, and Sergei Eisenstein personally brought him to his creative workshop. Additionally, he is a recipient the Order of the Red Star, Honored Art Worker of Ukraine and the Oleksandr Dovzhenko State Prize.

== Early life and education ==
Born on 31 January [O.S. 13 February] 1909, in the Ukrainian city of Koziatyn. Ivanov was raised in a modest household. His mother, Tetiana Andriivna, was a homemaker, while the father, Mykhailo Spyrydonovych, worked as a military paramedic at the district hospital. His father died from cholera he caught in 1919 while tending to the ill, leaving his wife and their three children. At the age of 13, he began to work as a sender for the department of education in order to pay his bills. His mother remarries in 1923 and assists stepfather Mykhailo Zhydkomlinov чin raising her children.

Ivanov holds diplomas from Berdychiv Craft School (1923–1925) and Zhmerynka Vocational School (1925–1927). He was then given the specialization of assistant machinist in Vyazma. After earning his locomotive driving certification in 1929, he moves to Moscow to pursue further education. He was assigned to the Moscow State University of Railway Engineering in 1932. However, he decides to send paperwork to the Moscow State Institute of Cinematography. After enrolling in the director's program, he receives instruction from filmmaker Sergei Eisenstein, who first recognized his comedic ability.

== Military service ==
Ivanov's first workplace was the Dovzhenko Film Studio, where he had previously served as an assistant director. When he inquired for the front, he was informed that the film served as both the front and the rear of the resistance to Adolf Hitler. Film studio employees were relocated to Ashgabat in 1942. He led a Red Army's flamethrower platoon and assistant to the Chief of Staff to fight near Stalingrad, crossed the Dnieper, and was the first to sign at the gates of the Dovzhenko Film Studio upon Kiev's liberation. He had two significant injuries, and was discharged due to health concerns, and more.

== Filming career ==
The Kyiv Film Studio refused to hire Ivanov as a disabled person, therefore he continued to direct in the film studios in Sverdlovsk, Vilnius, and Kaunas after the war. He didn't go back to Dovzhenko's film studio until 1950. Among the almost ten movies Ivanov directed was the comedy Chasing Two Hares (1961). Writer of children's books Наша Наташа (1954), Доріжка (1958), poetry collections Доделки-переделки, Попади, and Сатирический патруль (1960).

Iavnov spent the rest of his life fighting the bureaucracy, despite his skill. This had an impact on health; on 18 June 1981, he died following two heart attacks at the age of 73. He was laid to rest in the Baikove Cemetery beside his family.

== Filmography ==
=== As director ===
Sources:

- Пригоди з піджаком Тарапуньки (1955)
- Шельменко-денщик (1957)
- Сто тисяч (1958)
- Олекса Довбуш (1960)
- Chasing Two Hares (1961)
- The Keys of Skies (1965)
- Непосиди (1968, co-authored with Abram Narodytsky)
- Вулиця тринадцяти тополь (1969, co-authored with Abram Narodytsky)
- Веселі Жабокричі (1973)
- Ні пуха, ні пера (1975)
- Співає Микола Кондратюк (1977)
- Оглядини (1980)
- Снігове весілля (1981)

=== As script writer ===
- Chasing Two Hares (1961)
- Рибки захотілось (1963)
- Бджоли і люди (1963)
- Непосиди (1967)

== Awards and recognitions ==
Ivanov was awarded the Order of the Red Star, as well as medals for bravery and the defense of Stalingrad, for his service during World War II. In Koziatyn, a memorial plaque was erected in 2007 on the home of the departmental hospital's original structure, where he was born. Ivanov has been given the following membership and awards:

- Order of the Red Star
- Oleksandr Dovzhenko State Prize (1999)
- Honored Art Worker of Ukrainian SSR (1974)
- Member of the National Writers' Union of Ukraine (1956)
- Member of the Ukrainian Association of Cinematographers
