= A Friend of the Deceased =

1997 film directed by Viacheslav Kryshtofovych

- Directed by: Viacheslav Kryshtofovych
- Written by: Andriy Kurkov
- Starring: Oleksandr Lazarev Jr.
- Cinematography: Vilen Kalyuta
- Release date: 10 September 1997 (TIFF)
- Running time: 100 minutes
- Countries: France; Ukraine
- Language: Russian/Ukrainian

A Friend of the Deceased (Russian: «Приятель покойника, romanized: Priyatel pokoynika; Ukrainian: «Приятель небіжчика», romanized: Pryiatel nebizhchyka) is a 1997 Ukrainian drama film directed by Viacheslav Kryshtofovych. The film was selected as the Ukrainian entry for the Best Foreign Language Film at the 70th Academy Awards, but was not accepted as a nominee.

== Plot ==
The era of "wild capitalism" was gaining momentum when Anatoly was abandoned by his wife. He was young, handsome, and intelligent, with knowledge of a foreign language, but for some reason he did not fit into modern life, which was completely incomprehensible to him. A meeting with his former classmate Dima, who was successfully trading in a commercial kiosk, became his Ariadne's thread in the world of new morality. Life becomes like a movie. Anatoliy's rash and frivolous act became the first link in a chain of events that resulted in the murder of a man who was himself a hired killer. This man's little son called Anatoliy dad... How will Anatoliy behave after that? Will he become a father to the boy or will he take the place of the killer?

== Cast ==
- Aleksandr Lazarev Jr. as Anatoliy
- Anzhelika Nevolina as Katia
- Elena Korikova as Maryna
- Tetiana Kryvytska Stang Lund as Lena / Vika
- Yevheniy Pashin as Dima
- Serhiy Romaniuk as Ivan
- Anatoliy Mateshko as Borys
- Rostislav Yankovsky as Ihor Lvovych

== Film crew ==
- Director of Photography: Vyacheslav Kryshtofovych
- Screenwriter: Andriy Kurkov
- Director of Photography: Vilen Kalyuta
- Production designer: Roman Adamovych
- Composer: Vladimir Hronsky
- Sound director: Heorhiy Stremovsky

== See also ==
- List of submissions to the 70th Academy Awards for Best Foreign Language Film
- List of Ukrainian submissions for the Academy Award for Best Foreign Language Film
