= Baklanova Muraviika =

Village in Chernihiv Raion, Ukraine

Coordinates: 51°24′45″N 31°26′30″E

Baklanova Muraviika (Ukrainian: Бакланова Муравійка) is a village in Ukraine, in Chernihiv Raion, Chernihiv Oblast. The population is 473 persons in 2014; in the early 2000s 645 persons lived in the village.

== History ==
In 2007 village school was closed and pupils were transferred in a school in Gorbove.

Until 18 July 2020, Baklanova Muraviika belonged to Kulykivka Raion. The raion was abolished in July 2020 as part of the administrative reform of Ukraine, which reduced the number of raions of Chernihiv Oblast to five. The area of Kulykivka Raion was merged into Chernihiv Raion.

During the Russo-Ukrainian War, the village was recaptured by Ukrainian forces on 10 March 2022.

== Famous people ==
- Vadim Skuratovsky (Vadym Leontiyovych Skurativskiy) is a Ukrainian art historian and critic, an expert in literature, philologist, and political essayist.

== Gallery ==
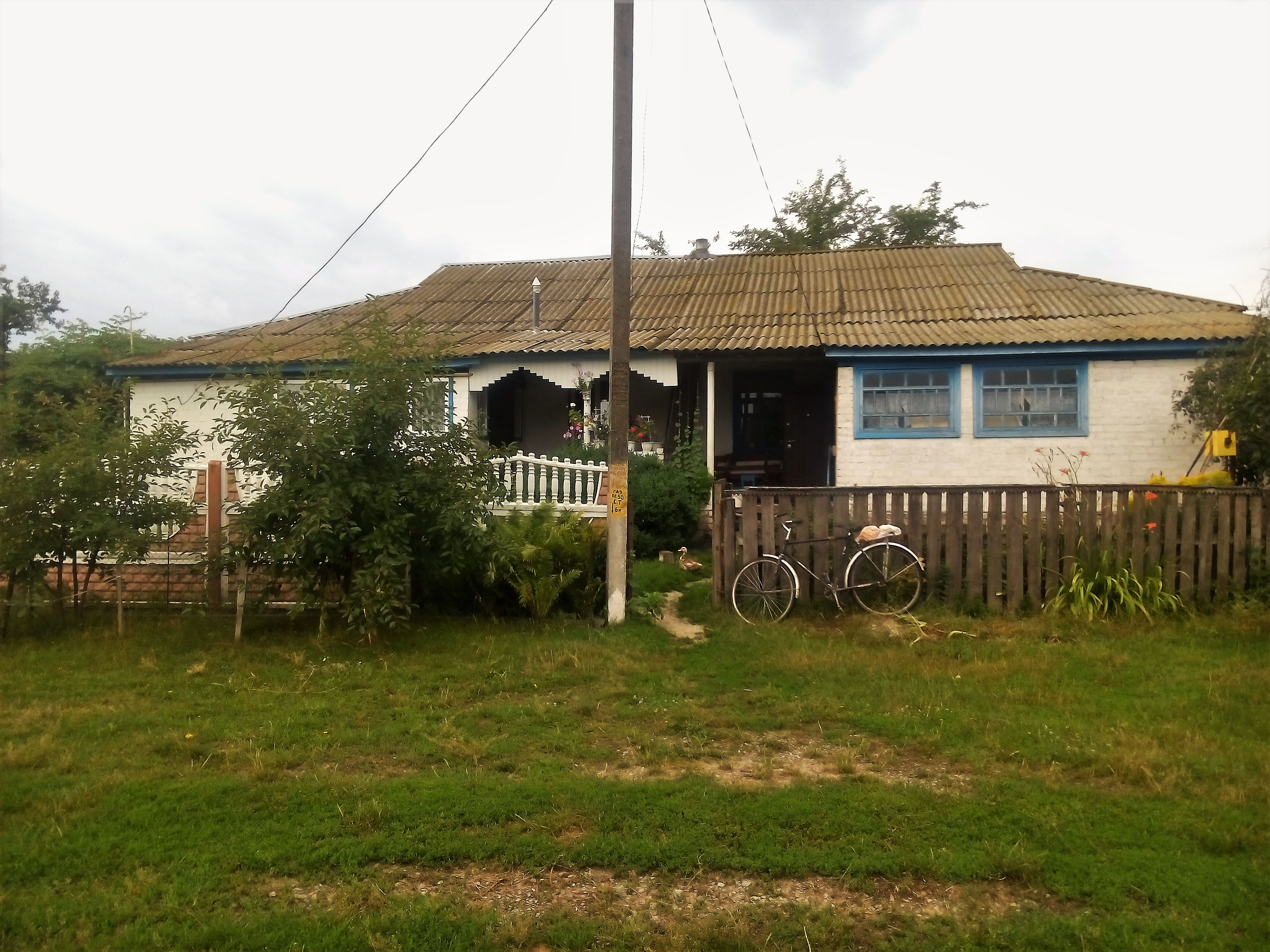
A typical "khata" (a rural house)

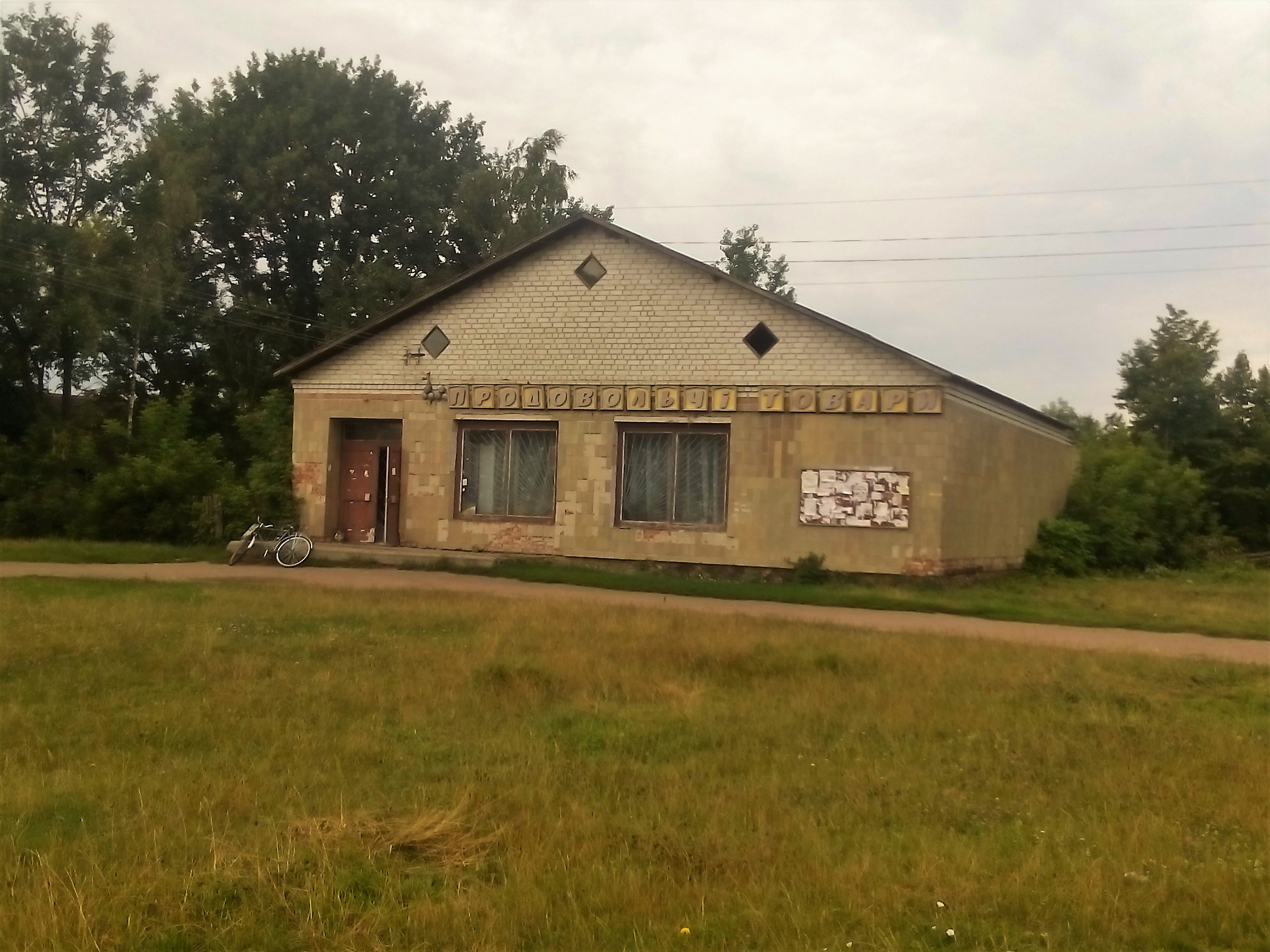
Shop

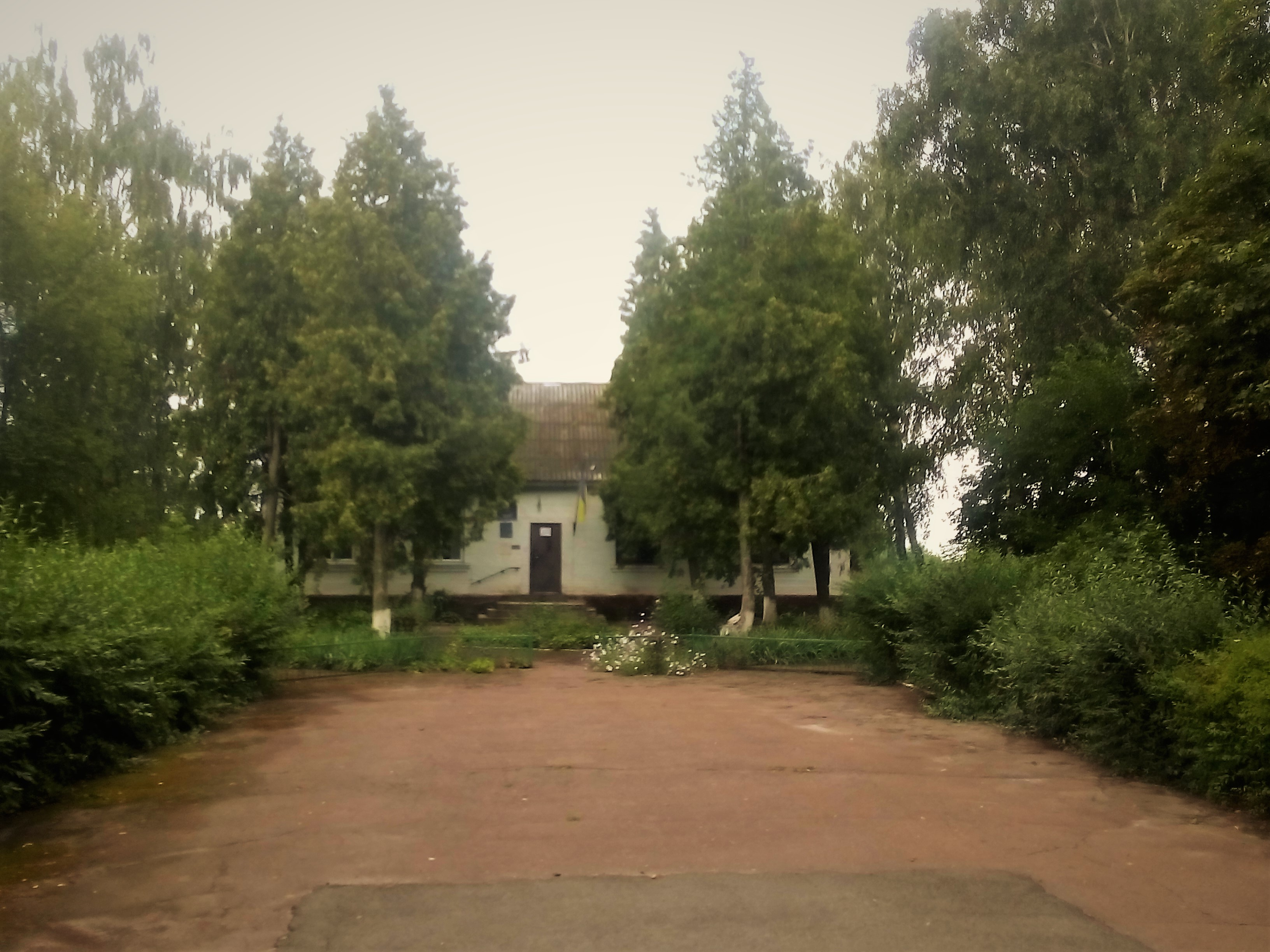
Village council and post office

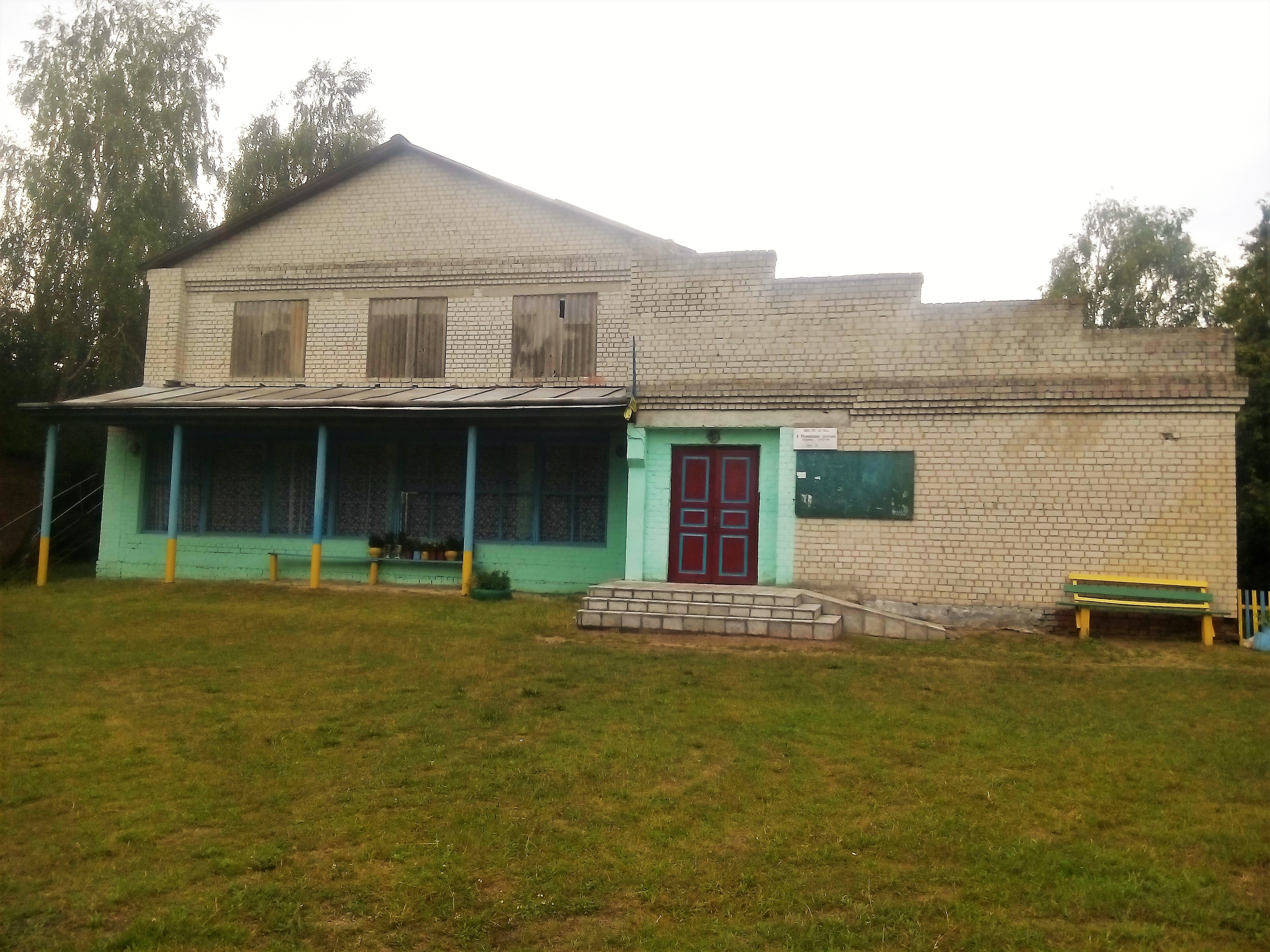
Village club

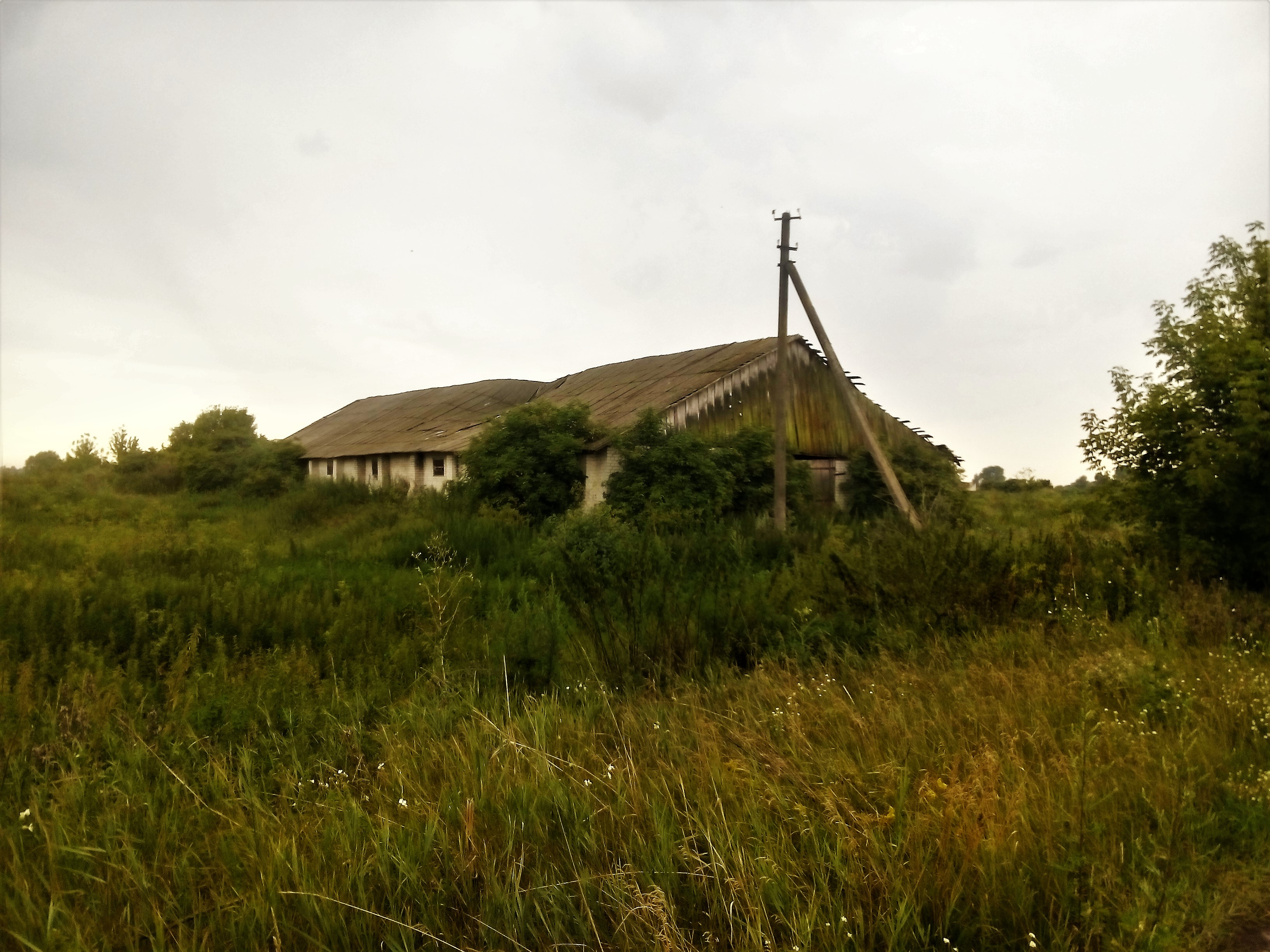
Abandoned farms

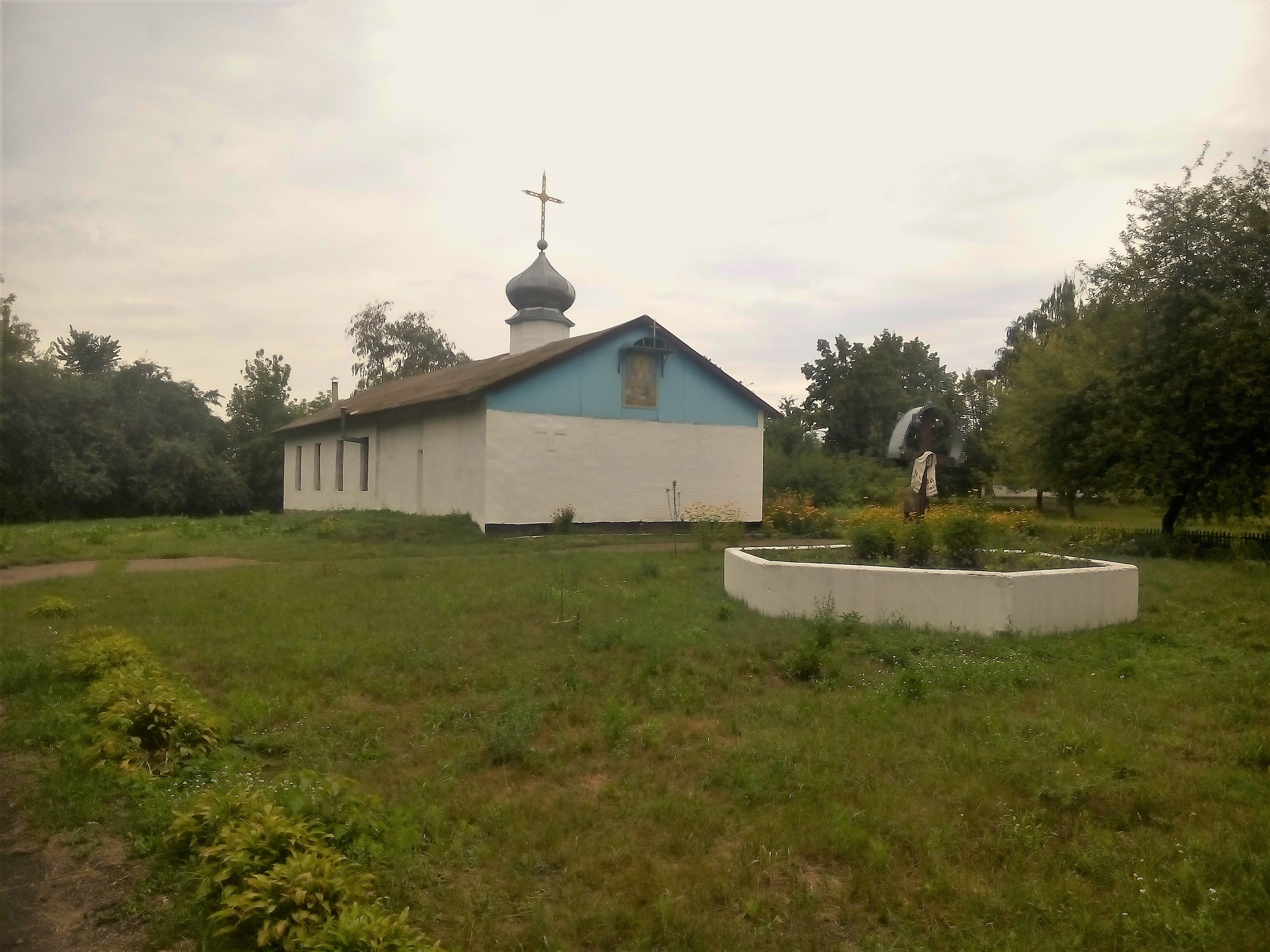
Church

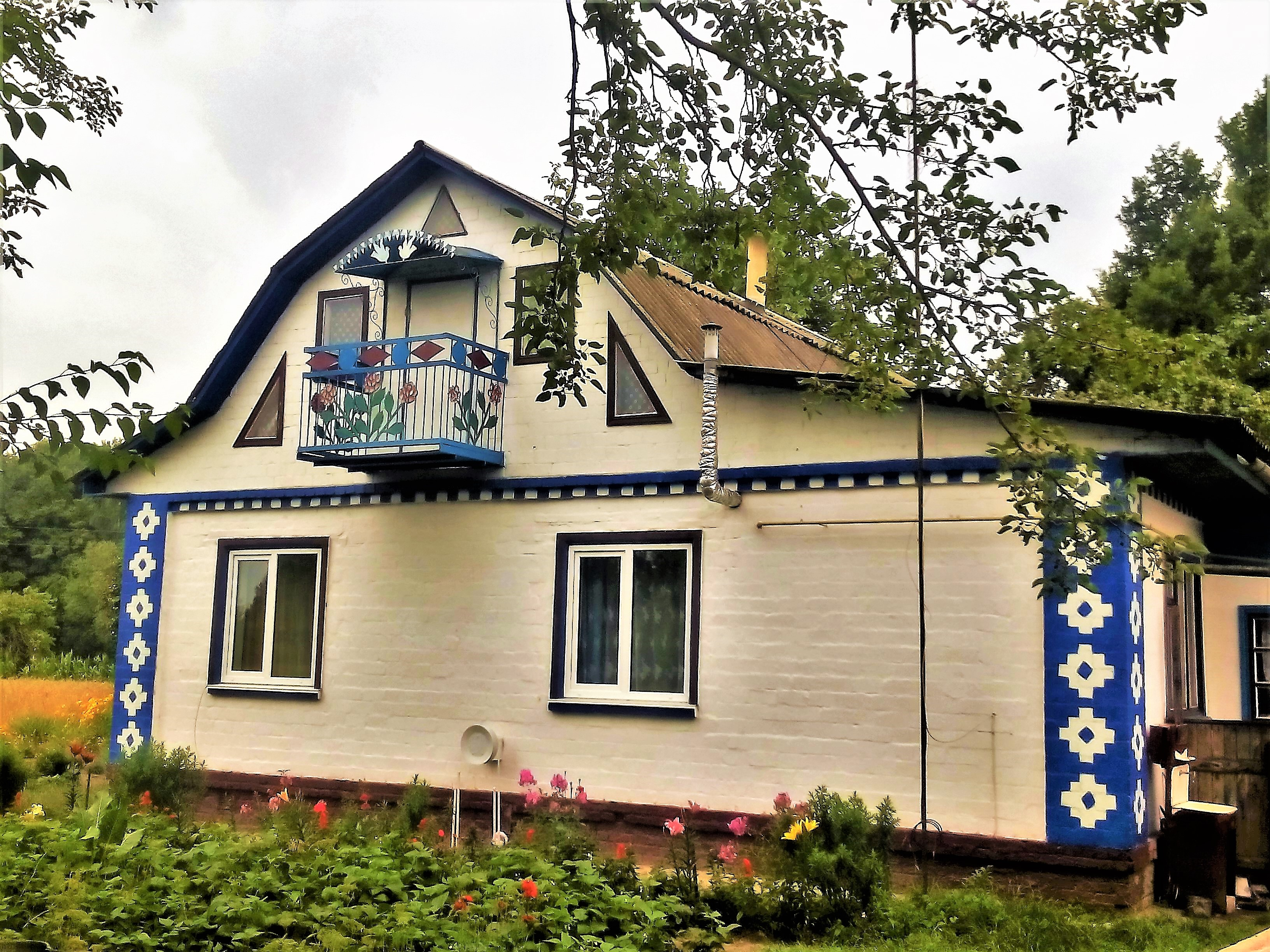
Shyroka Street

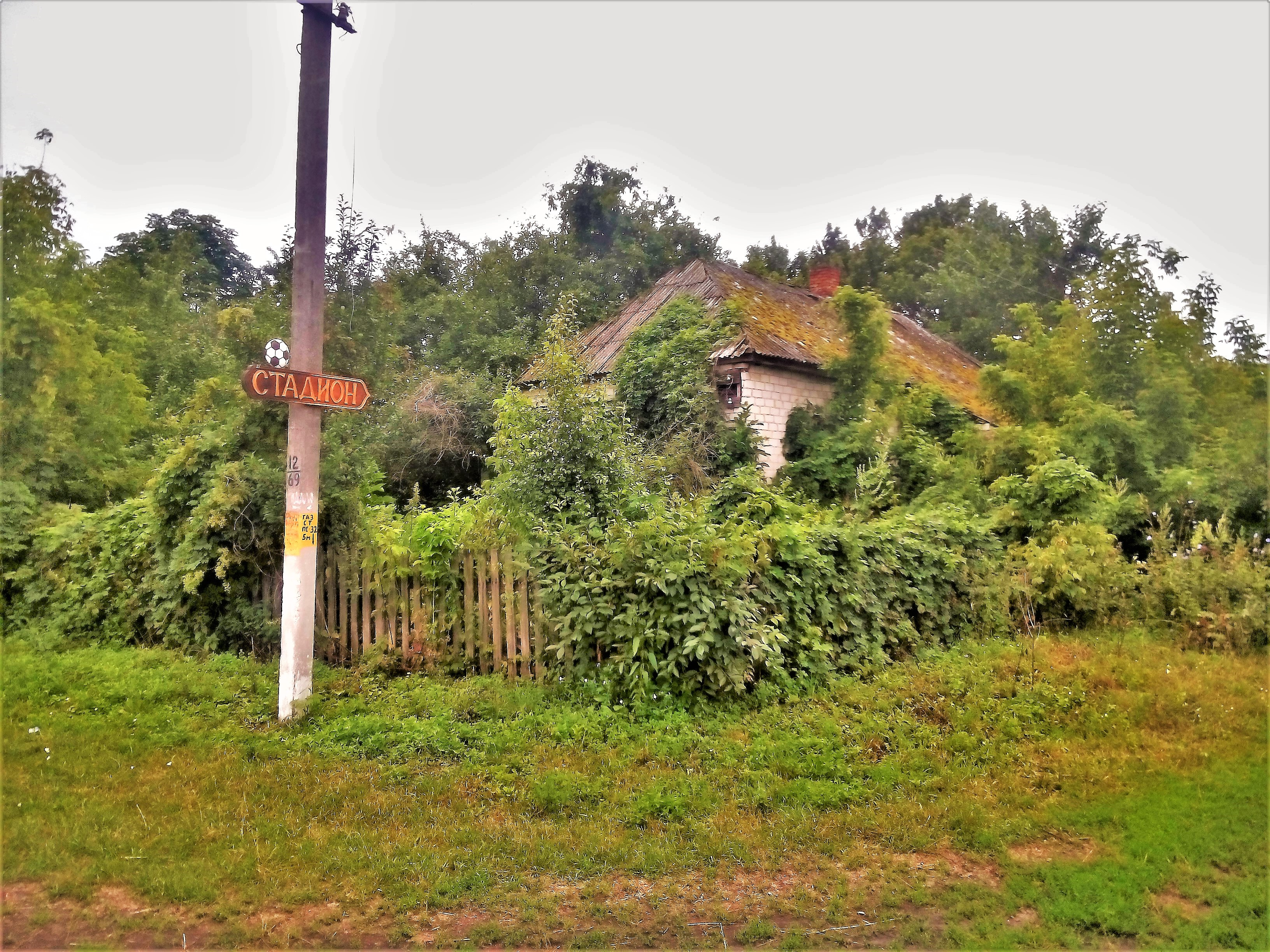
Abandoned khata on Central Street

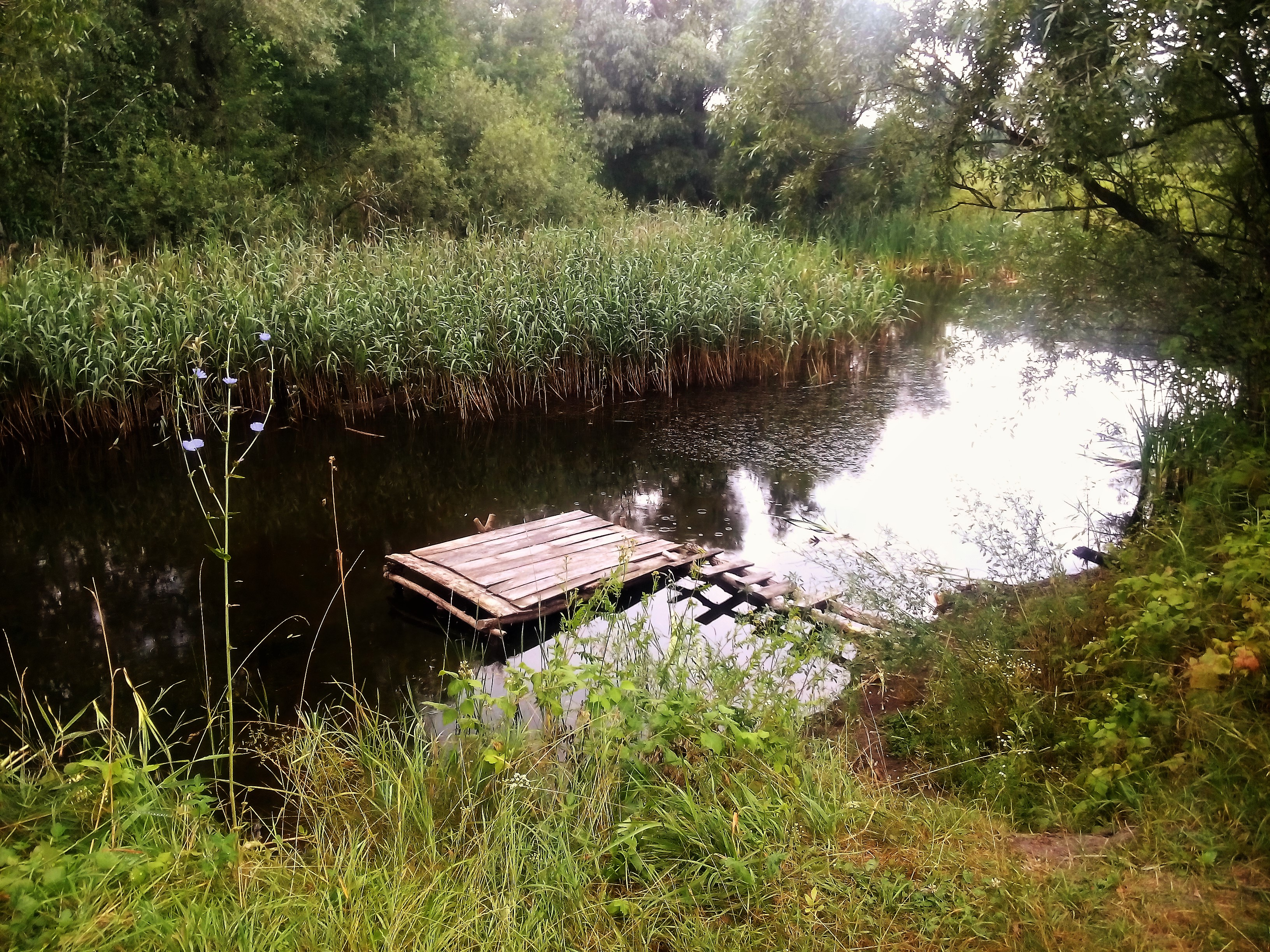
Pond

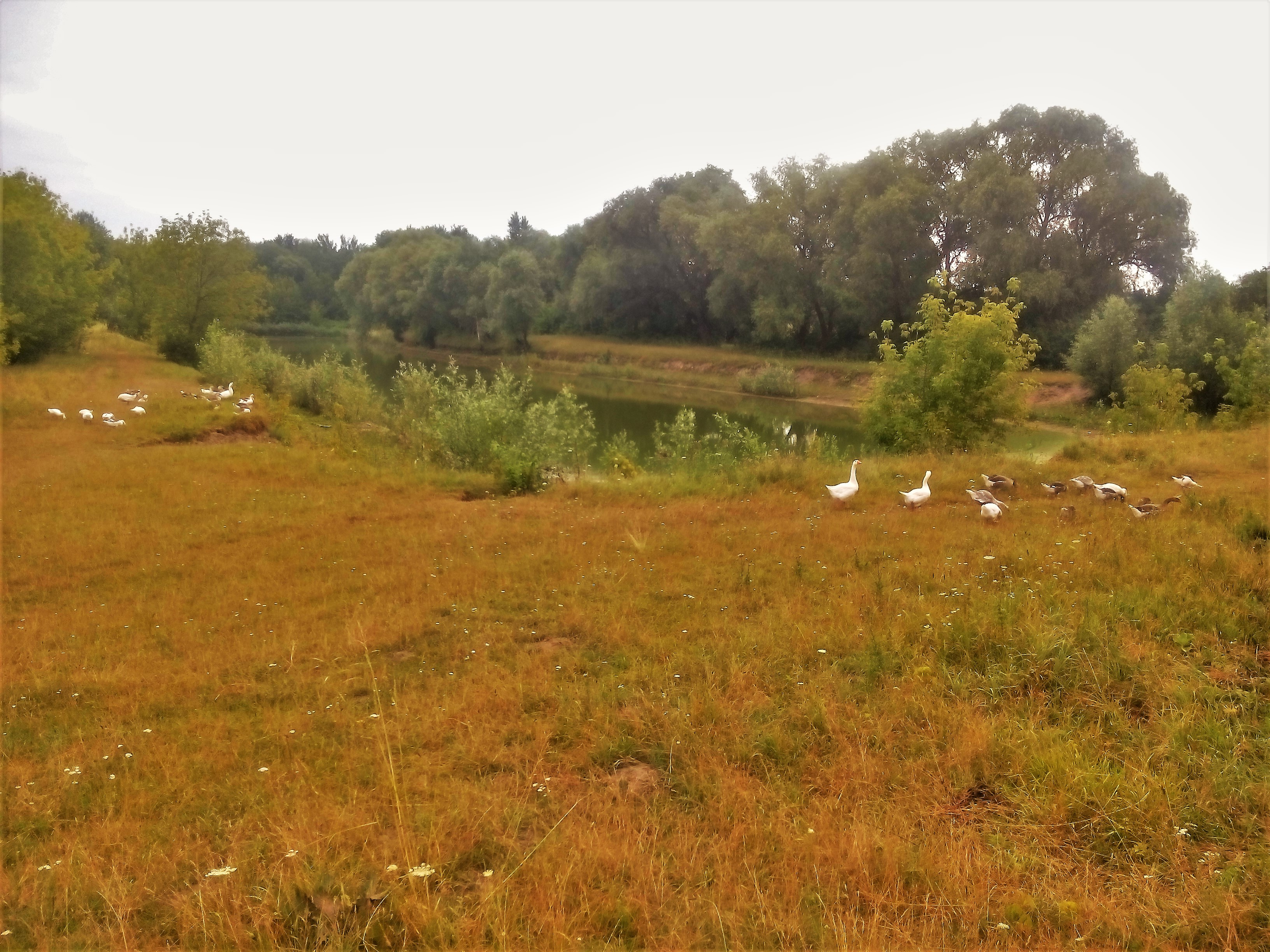
A pond in the village center

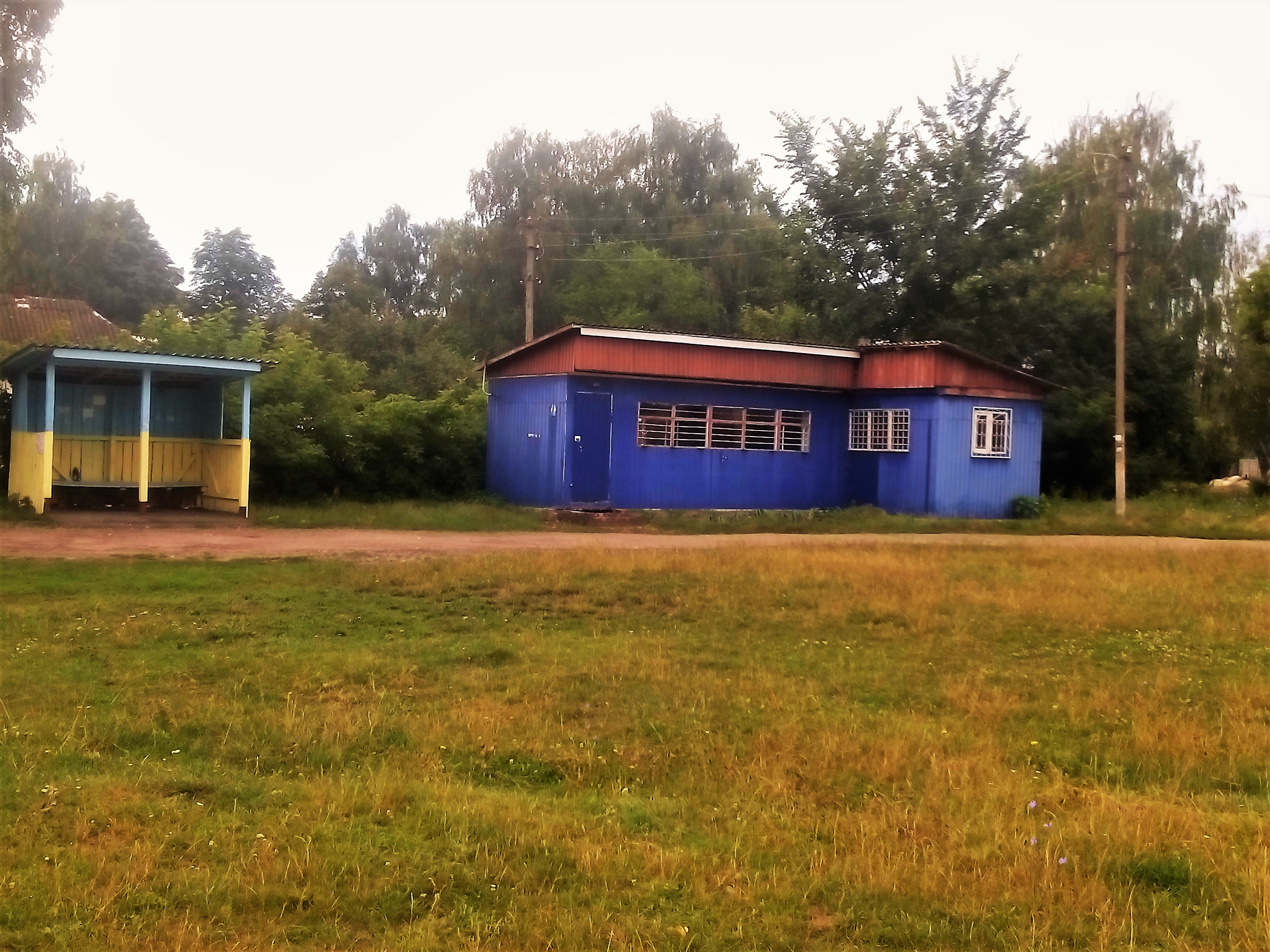
Bus stop

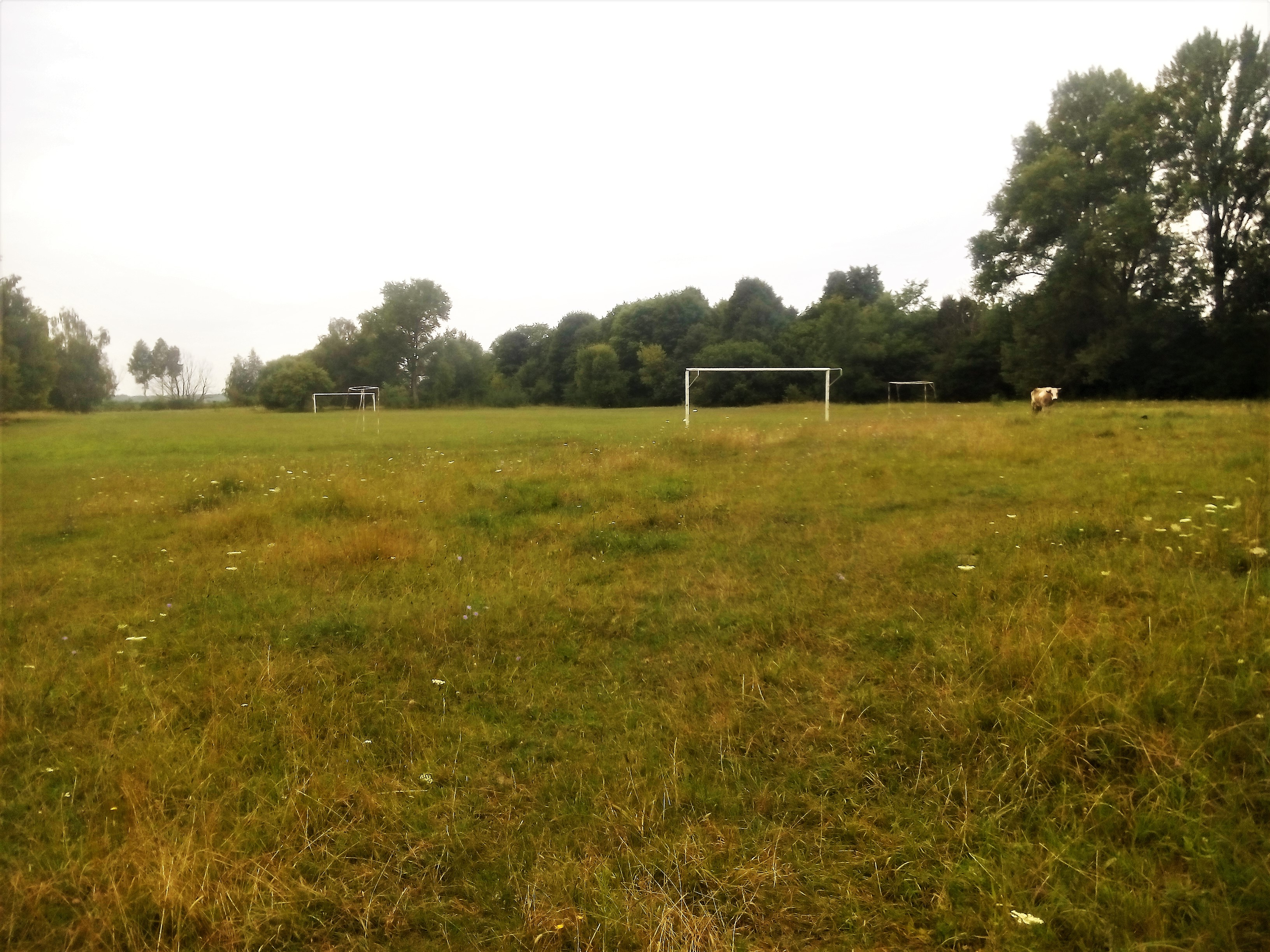
Stadium

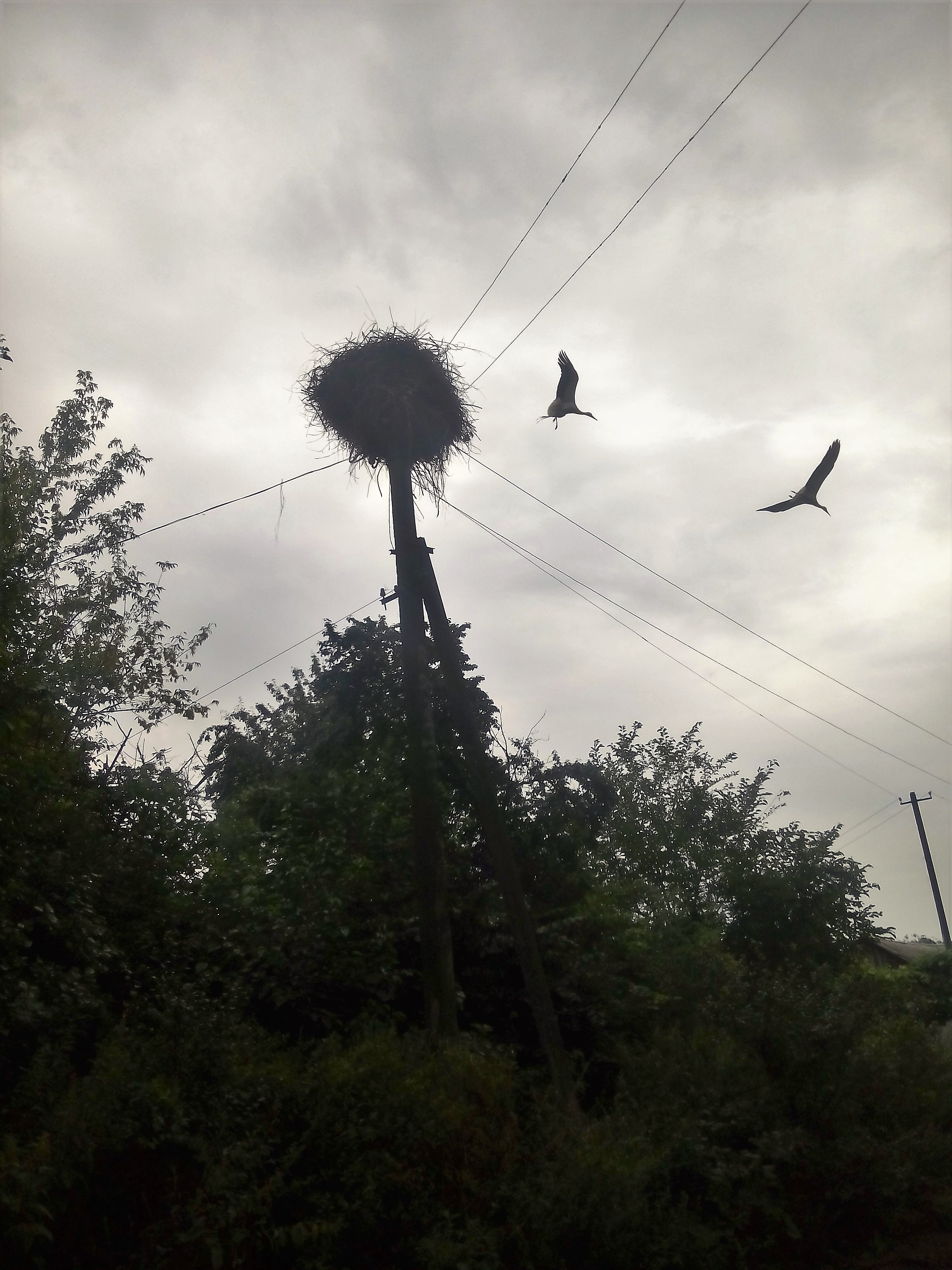
Storks flying over the village

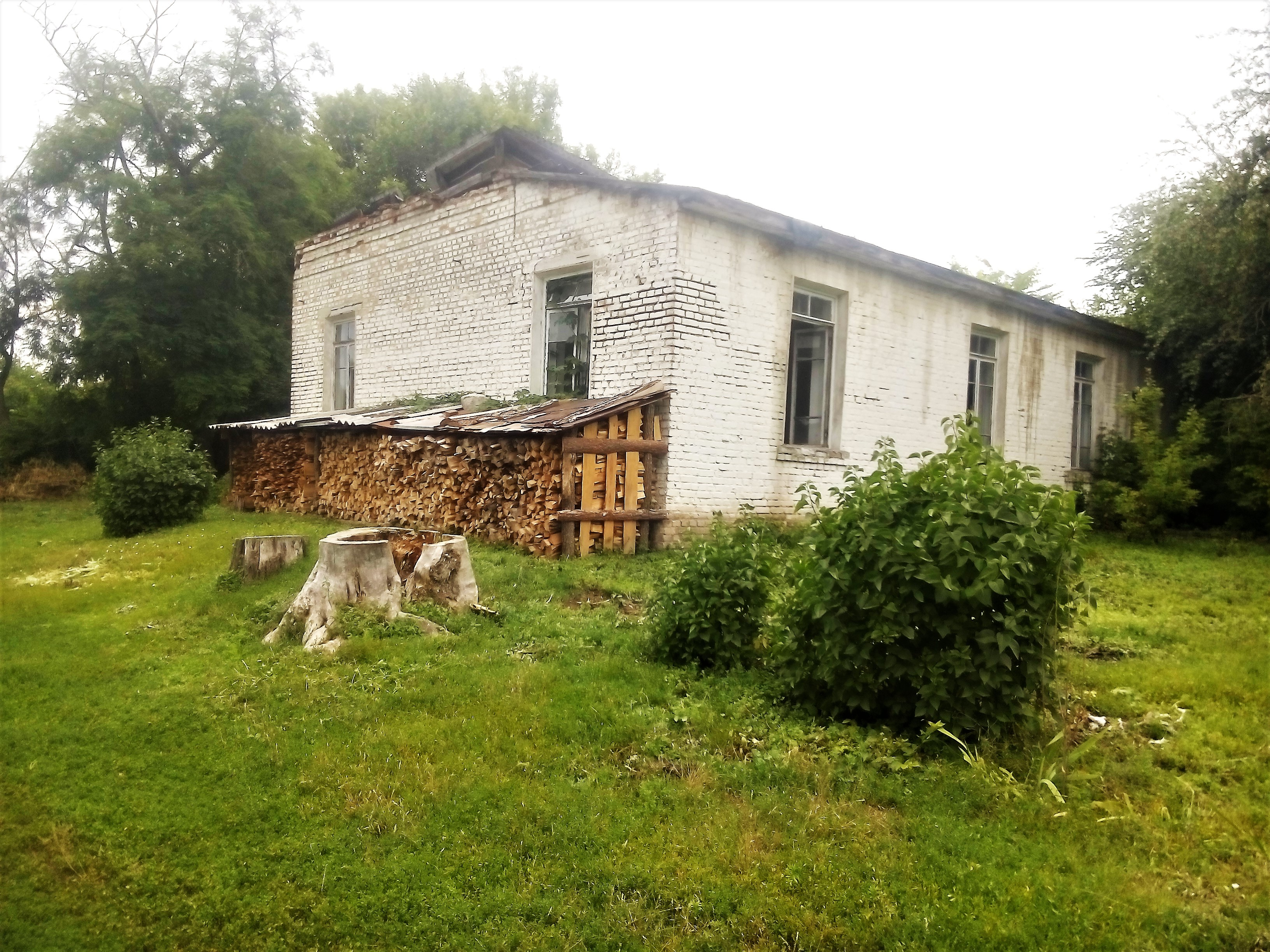
Abandoned school

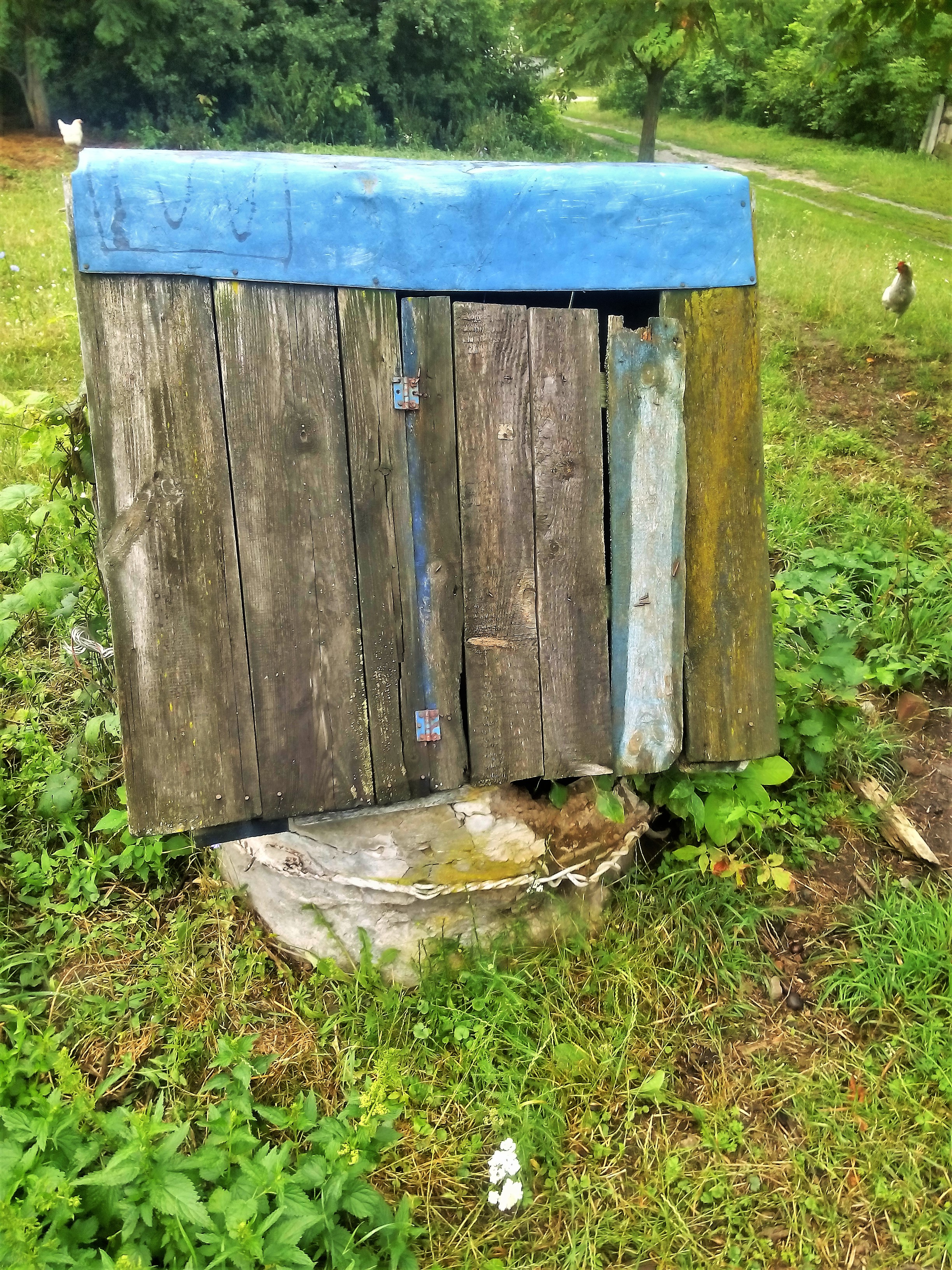
A well in the village

== Посилання ==
- Село Бакланова Муравейка, Черниговскаго уѣзда. — Черниговъ: Типографія Губернскаго Правленія, 1904. — 29 с.
- Черниговские епархиальные известия. Отдел официальный, неофициальный. № 24 (15 декабря 1911 г.) — с. 721—723.
