= Egor Druzhinin =

Russian actor, film director and choreographer

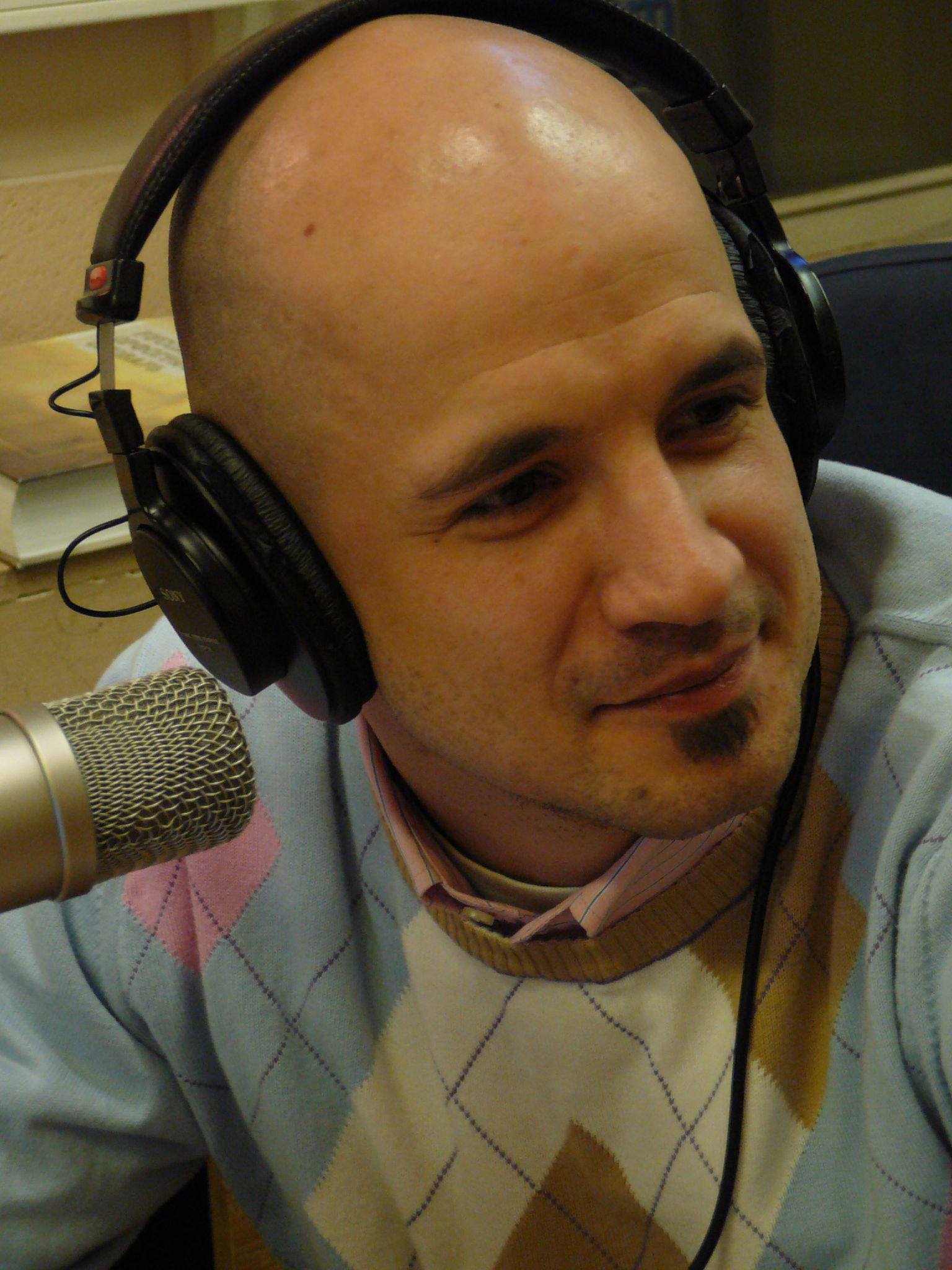
- Born: Egor Vladislavovich Druzhinin; 12 March 1972 (age 54); Leningrad, Russian SFSR, Soviet Union
- Occupations: Actor, choreographer, theater director
- Years active: 1983

Egor Vladislavovich Druzhinin (Russian: Егор Владиславович Дружинин, born 12 March 1972) is а Russian actor, film director and choreographer. Laureate of the Golden Mask.

== Biography ==
Egor Druzhinin was born in Leningrad, Russian SFSR, Soviet Union (now Saint Petersburg, Russia). His father was choreographer Vladislav Druzhinin who worked in Komissarjevsky Theatre and in his own studio of pantomime called “Kvadrat”. Egor became famous after playing the main role in two comedic films Adventures of Petrov and Vasechkin, Usual and Incredible and Vacation of Petrov and Vasechkin, Usual and Incredible. He also has step-sister Lisa who is 18 years younger.

After graduating from Saint Petersburg State Theatre Arts Academy, he worked in Leningrad Young People’s Theatre. Since 1994 Druzhinin had been studying in New York City in Alvin Ailey American Dance Theater. After a few years of studying in USA Egor came back to Saint Petersburg and started working as choreographer. He worked with performers such as Philipp Kirkorov, Laima Vaikule etc. In 2002 Egor played one of main parts in Russian adaptation of musical Chicago. Druzhinin was working not only as dancer but also as actor. He played significant roles in several films like “Ali-Baba and forty robbers”. He taught choreography participants of the TV project Fabrika Zvyozd. In 2004 and 2005 he took part in musicals Cats and The Twelve Chairs. Currently, Druzhinin is a producer, a choreographer, a performer in his own play “Life everywhere” and a judge in show “Tancy on TNT”.

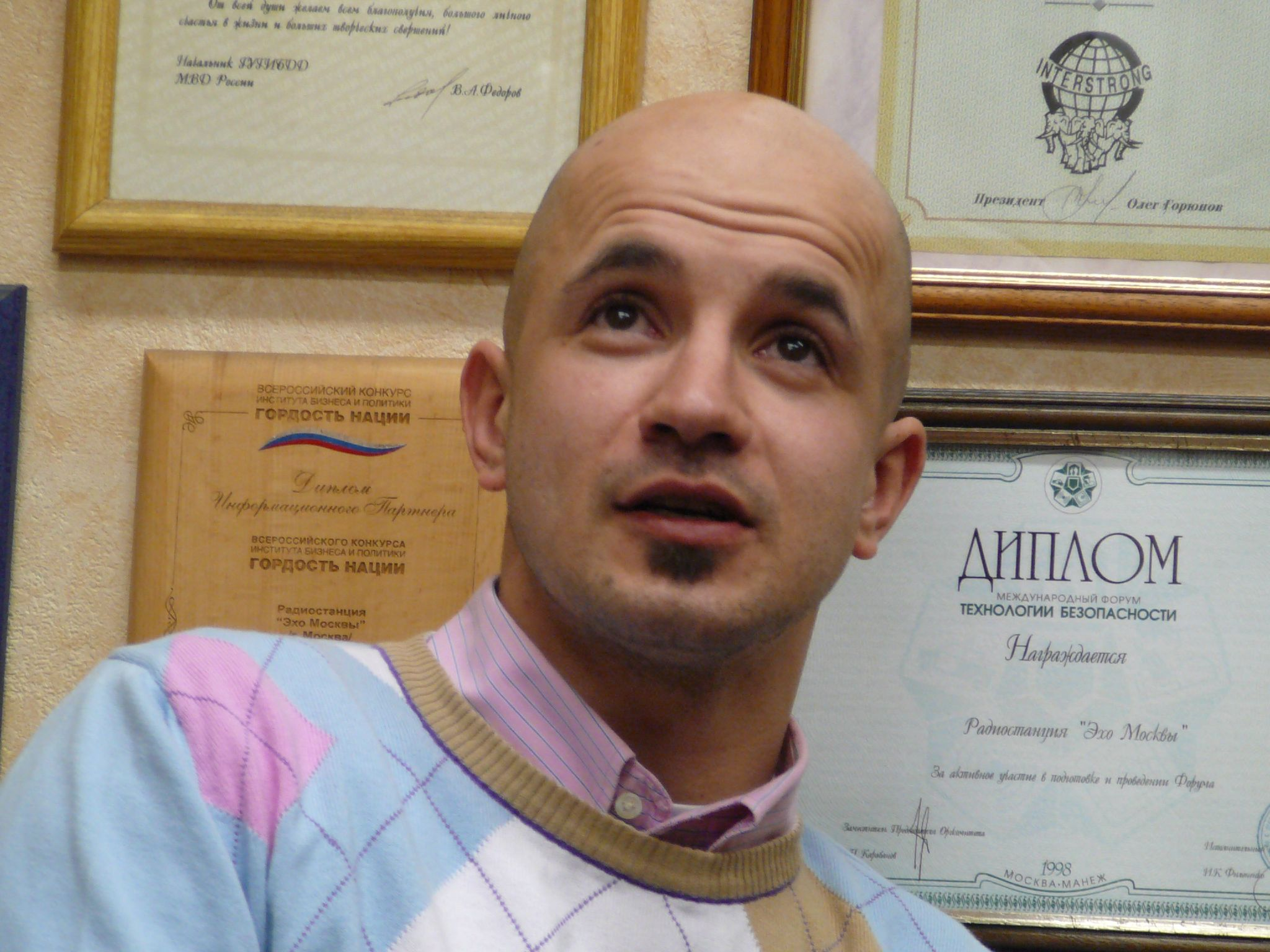
Egor Druzhinin in 2007

== Private life ==
Egor Druzhinin is married to the actress Veronica Ickovich. They have three children: daughter Alexandra and sons Tihon and Platon.

== Filmography ==
=== Actor ===
Year	Film	Role
1983	Adventures of Petrov and Vasechkin, Usual and Incredible	Petya Vasechkin
1984	Vacation of Petrov and Vasechkin, Usual and Incredible	Petya Vasechkin
2004	Balzac Age, or All Men Are Bast ...	Roma
2004	Ali-Baba and forty robbers	Ali-Baba
2011	Traffic light	Egor
2022	The Vampires of Midland	Boris Feliksovich

=== Director ===
- 2005 - Night in the style of childhood
- 2009 - First Love
- 2013 - Hello, I'm your Friday! (TV series)
