= Moskal-Charivnyk =

- Directed by: Mykola Zaseev-Rudenko
- Written by: Mykola Zaseev-Rudenko
- Starring: Ruslana Pysanka; Oleksandr Bondarenko; Bohdan Beniuk; Kostiantyn Shaforenko
- Music by: Ihor Poklad
- Production company: Dovzhenko Film Studios
- Release date: 1995
- Running time: 77 minutes
- Country: Ukraine
- Languages: Ukrainian, Russian

Moskal-Charivnyk (Ukrainian: «Москаль-Чарівник», lit. ''Muscovite Wizard'') is a 1995 musical comedy film by the Ukrainian filmmaker Mykola Zaseev-Rudenko based on the 1819 vaudeville by Ukrainian writer Ivan Kotliarevskyi Moskal-Charivnyk. The film features a detailed portrayal of Ukrainian culture, showing the beauty of Ukrainian traditions, music, costumes, and language.

== Plot ==
The story takes place in Ukraine at the start of 19th century. A local scribe, Fintyk, tries to seduce a female farmer, Tetyana, whose husband, Mykhailo, as a chumak left for Crimea for nine weeks to bring salt. A Russian army soldier came over and asked for a stay. All Russian soldiers did not speak Ukrainian; in Ukraine they were called moskali (moskal – singular) hence the name of the movie. The woman tries to cover up her flirting and lets the soldier to stay for rest. When Mykhailo arrives soon thereafter she hides the scribe. Moskal knew that something is going on between Tetyana and Fintyk yet he finds a common ground with his hostess. They agreed to get rid of the scribe yet not to spoil her marriage. Then there are a few scenes that reflect a peculiar inter-ethnic relationship between Ukrainians and Russians in face of the soldier. By the end of the movie the soldier finally pulls the scribe out of a hiding place while Mykhailo is blacking out whether out of a liquor or being shocked realizing the situation. In the last scene everybody explains to Mykhailo what have really happened and why. The husband gets really mad and has an intent to kill everybody, but moskal steps in just in time to defuse the situation.

== Cast ==
- Tetyana (wife) – Ruslana Pysanka
- Mykhailo (husband) – Oleksandr Bondarenko
- Moskal – Bohdan Beniuk
- Fintyk – Kostiantyn Shaforenko
- Georgy Drozd

== Awards ==
- 1996 — Audience Choice Award "Crystal Angel" IFF in Slavutych, Ukraine;
- 1996 — Second prize of the festival and the prize of spectator sympathies of the IFF in Gatchina, Russia;
- 1998: Oleksandr Dovzhenko State Prize for director Mykola Zasieyev-Rudenko, cinematographer Oleksandr Chornyi, and actors Beniuk, Bodnarenko, Pysanka.
