= Adventures of Petrov and Vasechkin, Usual and Incredible =

- Directed by: Vladimir Alenikov
- Written by: Vladimir Alenikov; Valentin Gorlov
- Starring: Dmitri Barkov; Egor Druzhinin; Inga Ilm; Alexander Lenkov; Margarita Korabelnikova
- Cinematography: Igor Feldstein
- Music by: Tatiana Ostrovskaya
- Production company: Odessa Film Studio
- Release dates: October 1983 (Molodist); June 1, 1984
- Running time: 134 minutes
- Country: Soviet Union
- Language: Russian

Adventures of Petrov and Vasechkin, Usual and Incredible (Russian: Приключения Петрова и Васечкина, обыкновенные и невероятные, romanized: Priklyucheniya Petrova i Vasechkina) is a 1983 Soviet two-part children's two-part musical comedy directed by Vladimir Alenikov. The plot follows two schoolboy friends, Petya Vasechkin and Vasya Petrov, and their attempts to assert themselves, and their schoolgirl friend, Masha Startseva, with whom they are both in love.

A year later, a sequel titled Vacation of Petrov and Vasechkin, Usual and Incredible was released.

== Plot ==
Masha is the best student аt school. In class, she receives an anonymous love letter. Petrov comes to the blackboard and writes a sentence full of mistakes. Meanwhile, Masha has corrected the spelling mistakes in the love letter. When she compares it to the mistakes Petrov made, she immediately realizes that the letter was from him. She rebuffs him by sending him a note saying that he must first learn how to write correctly.

Vasechkin wants to help his friend Petrov. Тhey read The Taming of the Shrew, which leads them to want to tame Masha in a similar way. But Masha is far too smart not to see through the boys' plan. Frustrated, they stroll through the streets imagining what it would be like if they had special powers. They encounter a strange man, who turns out to have magic powers. He grants the boys a total of three wishes. Petrov wishes to be the strongest man in the world, and Vasechkin only wants to get perfect grades. The third wish is not yet granted to them; they are to mull over it.

And indeed, the wishes come true. However, incredible strength soon turns out to be rather disadvantageous for Petrov. And also Vasechkin does not enjoy his wish — although he receives perfect grades, he has not actually become any smarter. Additionally, Masha is not impressed by the new skills of the boys. Eventually, they want to be the same as they were before, but the wizard has disappeared. Masha helps them formulate their wish correctly, and the boys lose their skills again.

The French class stages Little Red Riding Hood in French. Masha plays the title character. Petrov is supposed to play the wolf, but because he had reported sick to skip an exam, Vasechkin takes over the role. When Petrov hears this, he sneaks into the performance, and so Red Riding Hood suddenly faces two wolves. After the two guys ruin the show, they have even less of a chance with Masha.

While the boys have detention, Masha is awarded three times — as the best athlete of the school, as the best student in French, and as the best student paramedic. The boys then swear revenge. During swim class, they think of a solution — Petrov is to pretend that he is drowning, while Vasechkin is to save him in hopes of receiving a rescue medal and thus diverting attention away from Masha. But the plan fails, as it is Masha who saves both boys in the end.

And once again Masha is awarded, this time with a rescue medal. The boys realize that they can not outdo Masha. Instead, they focus on their abilities. While they have to do detention again, they use the opportunity to beautify the classroom by hanging wallpaper. And finally, they also attract the attention of Masha.

== Cast ==
=== Main characters ===
- Dmitri Barkov - Vasya Petrov
- Egor Druzhinin - Petya Vasechkin (voiced by Igor Sorin)
- Inga Ilm - Masha Startseva
- Alexander Lenkov - janitor / wizard
- Margarita Korabelnikova - Vasechkin's grandmother

=== Pupils ===
- Maxim Polyansky - Goroshko
- Svetlana Protasenkova - Luda Yablochkina
- Andrei Kanevsky - Skvortsov
- Alexey Gusev - Sidorov

=== Teachers ===
- Inna Alenikova - teacher of French Inna Andreevna
- Lyudmila Ivanova - teacher of Russian Alla Ivanovna
- Tatyana Bozhok - geography teacher Emma Markovna
- Victor Pavlovsky - teacher of labor Nikolai Ivanovich
- Yury Medvedev - principal of the school
- Vladislav Druzhinin - drawing teacher San Sanych
- Viktor Lysenko - physical education teacher

== Production ==
For the first time, Petrov and Vasechkin appeared in 1974 in the children's magazine Yeralash, where Vladimir Alenikov worked at that time as director and screenwriter.

Casting for the film took place in Kiev, Moscow, Odessa, and other cities. For the role of Vasechkin, the director found Yegor Druzhinin in Leningrad; Druzhinin was the son of the film's choreographer, Vladislav Druzhinin. After finding out that no one was yet cast for the second lead part, Yegor brought along his classmate, Dima Barkov, who eventually was cast as Petrov.

== Release ==
When both films about the exploits of Petrov and Vasechkin had already been shot, the Moscow film bosses, after watching them, categorically forbade to release them on screens, as the main characters of the films behaved in a way that was deemed too "non-Soviet." Then, Vladimir Alenikov decided to show the film to Irina Andropova, daughter of General Secretary Yuri Andropov, who at that time worked at a music magazine.

Arranging a meeting, Alenikov called the studio and asked to arrange a screening for the Andropov family. As soon as this information became known to officials, the issue of the release of the films was solved in a matter of hours. The premiere took place on June 1, 1984, at 16:30 on the First channel of the Soviet Central Television.

== Awards ==
- 1983, October 27–30 - XIV International Film Festival "Molodost-83" (Kiev)
  - The main prize of the festival "For the best embodiment of the modern theme"
  - Prize of the Central Committee of the Young Communist League of Ukraine "For the best embodiment of the youth theme"
- 1983, October 30 - International Festival of Arts "Young Voices"
  - Laureate of the International Festival of Arts "Young Voices" (Vladimir Alenikov)
- 1984, July - XXII International Film Festival in Gijón (Spain)
  - The main prize of the festival
- 1984, October 28–31 - IV International Film Festival "Molodost-84" (Kiev)
  - Prize of the State Television and Radio of the Ukrainian SSR "For the Best Television Film"
- 1984, October 31 - International Festival of Arts "Young Voices"
  - Laureate of the International Festival of Arts "Young Voices" (Vladimir Alenikov), for the film "Vacations of Petrov and Vasechkin"
- 1985, September 25 - VIII International Film Festival of Children's Films in Bratislava
  - Prize of the Danube'85
- 1985, October 1 - IX All-Union Festival of Television Films (Kiev)
  - Prize of the children's jury
