= Alexander Lenkov =

Russian actor

- Александр Леньков
- Born: Alexander Sergeyevich Lenkov; 17 May 1943; Rasskazovo, Tambov Oblast, Russian SFSR, Soviet Union
- Died: 21 April 2014 (aged 70); Moscow, Russia
- Occupation: Actor
- Years active: 1964–2014
- Children: 1

Alexander Sergeyevich Lenkov (Russian: Алекса́ндр Серге́евич Ленько́в; 17 May 1943 – 21 April 2014) was a Soviet-Russian film, stage and voice actor. He is probably best known for his voice acting in animated films and dubbing the foreign movies to Russian. He is the Russian voice of Mundungus Fletcher in Harry Potter and the Deathly Hallows – Part 1 (2010).

Alexander Lenkov was born in the town of Rasskazovo in Tambov Oblast, Russia, in 1943. His family soon moved to Moscow where he had lived ever since. In 1961–64 studied at the school-studio of Yuri Zavadsky at the Mossovet Theatre. Upon graduation Lenkov became an actor of the Mossovet Theatre.

Lenkov was a character actor whose career spanned over five decades. He starred in over a hundred feature and television films and in over 60 theatre productions. Taught at Gerasimov Institute of Cinematography (VGIK) in 2004–2014.

In 2001 he received two TEFIs for his work on television. Was awarded the Honored Artist of Russia in 1980 and the People's Artist of Russia in 1997.

Alexander Lenkov pours his soul into his character, creating a delightful and fascinating eccentric.

— Plays International, Vol. 14, Chancery Publications Limited, 1998

He was married to his childhood sweetheart Elena from the early 1960s until his death. The couple had a daughter Ekaterina (b. 1969) together.

Lenkov died from a long illness on 21 April 2014 in Moscow, aged 70. He was buried at the Troyekurovskoye Cemetery in Moscow.

== Filmography ==
- 1964 — Uninvented Story (Russian: Непридуманная история) as Felix Fonyakov
- 1964 — Spring Troubles (Весенние хлопоты) as Radik
- 1964 — The Keys of Skies (Ключи от неба) as Semyon Lagoda
- 1965 — Give Me a Book of Complaints (Дайте жалобную книгу) as Pavlik
- 1966 — Royal Regatta (Королевская регата) as Lyonya
- 1971 — Bat'ka (Батька) as Sashok
- 1972 — We Wait You, Boy (Ждём тебя, парень) as Petka
- 1973 — Break a Leg! (Ни пуха, ни пера) as Pyotr
- 1973 — Vasili Tyorkin (Василий Тёркин, TV) as Vasili Tyorkin
- 1974 — Teens in the Universe (Отроки во Вселенной) as Executor Robot
- 1974 — Unforgotten Song (Незабытая песня) as Kurchonok
- 1974—2013 — Yeralash (Ералаш, TV show) as different characters
- 1975 — '29 Spring (Весна двадцать девятого) as Maksim
- 1975 — Circus in the Circus as Alyosha
- 1976 — Po sekretu vsemu svetu (По секрету всему свету) as Deniska's dad
- 1976 — Mark Twain Stories (Рассказы Марка Твена) as reporter
- 1976 — Soldier And Mother (Солдат и мать) as Soldier
- 1977 — Vacation, Which Did Not Take Place (Отпуск, который не состоялся) as Andrey Ukhtomski
- 1978 — Schedule For After Tomorrow (Расписание на послезавтра) as Igor Nikolaevich
- 1979 — Spring Olympic Games, Or Chorus Chief (Весенняя Олимпиада, или Начальник хора) as Ryzhkin
- 1980 — And Endless Battle... From The Alexander Blok Life (И вечный бой... Из жизни Александра Блока)
- 1980 — Extraordinary Circumstances (Чрезвычайные обстоятельства) as Sasha Kulagin
- 1981 — Ugly Elsa (Безобразная Эльза, TV) as Pertti Oras
- 1982 — Take Him Alive (Взять живым) as Ptitsyn
- 1982 — Whose You Are, Old Stuff? (Вы чьё, старичьё?) as Valerian
- 1983 — Black and White Magic (Магия чёрная и белая) as Valentin Dmitrievich
- 1983 — Adventures of Petrov and Vasechkin, Usual and Incredible (Приключения Петрова и Васечкина, обыкновенные и невероятные) as Strange Yardman
- 1984 — There Will Come Soft Rains (Будет ласковый дождь) as Robot
- 1984 — Makar the Pathfinder (Макар-следопыт) as Timofei
- 1985 — Winter Cherry (Зимняя вишня) as Veniamin
- 1986 — Snow Queen Mystery (Тайна Снежной Королевы) as Snowman
- 1987 — Mysterious Inheritor (Загадочный наследник) as Gryaznov
- 1988 — Little Vera (Маленькая Вера) as Mikhail Petrovich
- 1988 — Island of Rusty General (Остров Ржавого генерала) as Robot Baba Yaga
- 1989 — There Are Dark Nights In The Sochi City (В городе Сочи тёмные ночи) as Lena's father
- 1989 — The Village of Stepanchikovo And Its Inhabitants (Село Степанчиково и его обитатели) as Yezhevikin
- 1989 — Cowberries In The Forest (Во бору брусника) as Kirill
- 1990 — Sanit Zone (Сэнит зон) as Zykin
- 1991 — Talking Monkey (Говорящая обезьяна) as Maryin
- 1991 — Funeral On Second Floor (Похороны на втором этаже) as Burry
- 1991 — Devil Incarnate (Исчадье ада) as Heinrich
- 1992 — Good Night (Доброй ночи) as Slavik
- 1992 — Spiderweb (Паутина) as Grisha
- 1992 — Tractor Drivers 2 (Трактористы 2) as Muscovite
- 1993 — No Tricks, Please! (Давайте без фокусов!) as Customer
- 1993 — Love Desire (Желание любви) as Guest
- 1993 — Silence Code (Кодекс Молчания 2) as Makarov
- 1993 — Idiot's Dreams (Мечты идиота) as Croupier
- 1993 — About Foma The Businessman (Про бизнесмена Фому) as Comrade Basurmanov
- 1994 — Winter Cherries 3 (Зимняя вишня 3) as Veniamin
- 1995 — Tram In Moscow (Трамвай в Москве) as tram technician
- 1995 — On the Corner, Near by Patriarch Ponds 2 (На углу, у Патриарших 2, TV series) as Arkady
- 1996 — Agape (Агапе) as Pasha
- 1996 — The Return of the Battleship (Возвращение броненосца) as Verka's boyfriend
- 1996 — Pages of Theater Parody (Страницы театральной пародии) as Pierre d'Aurebour
- 1996 — Strawberries (Клубничка, TV series) as Belyanchikov
- 1998 — Prince Yuri Dolgorukiy (Князь Юрий Долгорукий) as Poacher
- 1998 — The Barber of Siberia (Сибирский цирюльник) as scientist
- 1999 — Directory of Death (Директория смерти) as astrologist
- 2000 — Turetski's March (Марш Турецкого, TV series) as Spirin
- 2001 — Drakosha and Co. (Дракоша и компания) as Konovalov
- 2002 — Ha! (Ха!, TV series) as different characters
- 2002 — Provincialists (Провинциалы, TV series) as director
- 2002 — Brigada (Бригада, TV series) as episode
- 2002 — Bad Habit (Дурная привычка) as Surgeon
- 2002 — Alexander Pushkin (Александр Пушкин) as Bitkov
- 2003 — Dark Horse (Тёмная лошадка) as Adam Borisovich
- 2003 — Siberia Girl (Сибирочка) as Mr. Rosetti
- 2003 — There is an Idea (Есть идея) as Kirich
- 2004 — That Queen of Spade (Эта пиковая дама, TV) as Marek
- 2004 — Reflections (Отражения) as episode
- 2004 — Thieves and Prostitutes. Space Flight Is the Prize (Воры и проститутки. Приз — полёт в космос) as episode
- 2004 — Hello, Dweeb! (Hello, Дохлый!) as doctor
- 2005 — The Check Kiss (Контрольный поцелуй) as episode
- 2005 — War Man (Человек войны) as Urban
- 2006 — What Woman Wants (Чего хочет женщина) as episode
- 2006 — The Pursuit of the Angel (Погоня за ангелом) as Homeless
- 2006 — Paparazza (Папараца) as Aleksey Alekseevich
- 2006 — Dad The Handyman (Папа на все руки, TV series) as Neighbour
- 2006 — Big Girls (Большие девочки) as Isaac Newton or Saveliy Piskunov
- 2006 — Happiness Rails (Рельсы счастья, TV series) as Old man
- 2008 — Yermolovs (Ермоловы, TV series) as Castle ward
- 2009 — The Book of Masters (Книга мастеров) as senior gem-cutter
- 2009 — Bullet is Fool 2 (Пуля-дура 2. Агент почти не виден) as Pavel Nikitich
- 2010 — Toys (Игрушки, TV series) as Leopold Dormidontov
- 2010 — Detective Samovarov (Сыщик Самоваров, TV series) as Yefim Moiseyevich
- 2010 — Flowers From Liza (Цветы от Лизы) as Khariton
- 2011 — Caramel (Карамель, TV series) as Lev Radkovich
- 2012 — Interns (Интерны, TV series) as Natan Kupitman
- 2012 — Da Girlz (Деффчонки, TV series) as Viktor Borisovich
- 2013 — Teacher In Law (Учитель в законе, TV series) as Grey-haired
