= Vadim Skuratovsky =

Vadym Skurativskiy
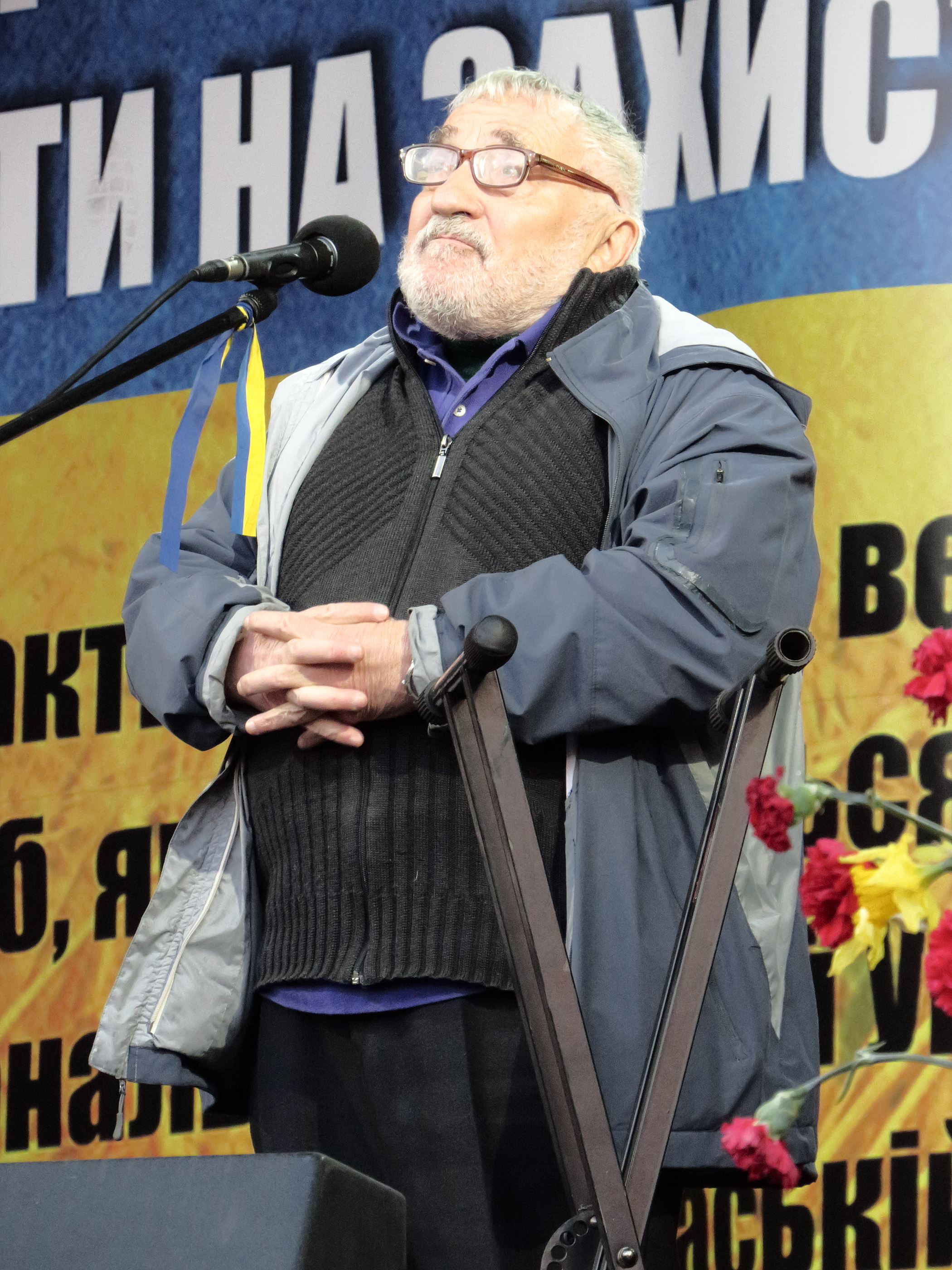
- Born: October 5, 1941 (age 84); Baklanova Muraviyka

Vadym Leontiyovych Skurativskiy is a Ukrainian art historian and critic, an expert in literature, philologist, and political essayist. He is a professor at the Kyiv National I. K. Karpenko-Kary Theatre, Cinema and Television University.

== Biography ==
Born 5 October 1941,

- MA Linguistics with Honours in Kiev State University in 1965,
- Ph.D. in Philology 1971,
- Postdoctoral degree in art critics 1998.
- Corresponding member of Ukrainian Academy of Arts (since 2001),
- Member of Ukrainian Association of Cinematographers (since 1990)
- Member of Writer's Union of Ukraine (since 1997).

== Scientific work and publications ==
Vadym Skurativskiy's books and monographs include:

- Essay on the world literature, 1995
- The Question of the Authorship of "The Protocols of the Elders of Zion", 2001

== Public life ==
Vadym Skurativskiy is well known both for his contribution to the education and popularization of historical science and scientific merits. He is widely contributing to the today's political discussions with the focus on universal values and human development. Vadim Skurativskiy is an author of more than 1000 publications in Ukrainian press.

== Work in cinematography ==
Was author-presenter of the documentary TV series "Fresh look on the history" (Ukraine National TV-2, 1996); "Monologues. Hopes and Losses" (TV Studio 1+1, 1997–98; "See the sole" (Ukraine National TV-1, 2002)

Played as an actor in movies "Birthmark", 1991; "Josephine: the mouse singer" (based on works of Franz Kafka), 1994; "Noise of the wind", 2002.

Received the Prix of Stozhary film festival for the best performance by non-professional actor for his role in "Josephine: the mouse singer" (based on works of Franz Kafka)

== Honours ==
Honoured Art Worker of Ukraine (2011)

== Interesting facts ==
In 1971-78 Vadym Skurativskiy was an editor of the critics department of Vsesvit (Universe) -- Ukrainian magazine of foreign literature. He has been fired on the accusation for "nationalistic inclinations"

Since 1998 and up until 2012 Vadym Skurativskiy had an author's column in Stolichnye Novosti weekly newspaper
