= Vacation of Petrov and Vasechkin, Usual and Incredible =

- Directed by: Vladimir Alenikov
- Written by: Vladimir Alenikov
- Produced by: Dmitry Byaly
- Starring: Egor Druzhinin; Dmitry Barkov; Inga Ilm
- Cinematography: Igor Feldstein
- Edited by: Vera Beylis
- Music by: Tatiana Ostrovskaya
- Production company: Odessa Film Studio
- Release date: 1984
- Running time: 135 minutes
- Country: Soviet Union
- Language: Russian

Vacation of Petrov and Vasechkin, Usual and Incredible (Russian: Каникулы Петрова и Васечкина, обыкновенные и невероятные, romanized: Kanikuly Petrova i Vasechkina, obyknovennye i neveroyatnye) is a 1984 Soviet musical film, sequel to Adventures of Petrov and Vasechkin, Ordinary and Incredible.

School hooligans Petrov and Vasechkin go to Young Pioneer camp for summer vacation. The community of the Camp waits for cool hooligan "Goose" and thinks Vasechkin is "Goose", like in The Government Inspector.

== Plot ==
=== Introduction ===
The children are planning to stage Nikolai Gogol's play The Government Inspector and listen to the reading by teacher Inna Andreevna. The general consensus amounts to the fact that while the play is good, it is out of date - it seems to the children that such a situation would nowadays be impossible. The teacher suggests that the action of the classical work to be moved to a modern pioneer camp .

=== "Hooligan (almost based on Gogol)" ===
The chairman of the council of the squad Anton receives from his friend a letter with a warning that a famous hooligan named "Goose" is about to come to the camp. Behind him, three boys march on the advice of the squad - Artem (head of the sports section), Alik (head of the chess section) and Lyosha (responsible for the camp wall newspaper ), and two girls - Olya Dobkina and Olya Bobkina (an allusion to Bobchinsky and Dobchinsky from Gogol's comedy) - eavesdrop at the door of the room where the council passes. The guys are not very happy about the arrival of the bully, since he can break the whole plan of educational work. Nevertheless, Anton proposes to exert every effort to re-educate the malicious hooligan, and his arrival is kept a secret for as long as possible so that there will be no panic in the camp. Nevertheless, Dobkina and Bobkina immediately spread news about the bully throughout the camp.

At this time, Petrov and Vasechkin arrive in the camp, who come there not on their own will - during the summer holidays they just want to rest, and the camp program with numerous sections and circles makes them depressed. Nevertheless, for the joy of the children it turns out that the head of the camp is their class teacher Inna Andreevna. Dobkina and Bobkina decide that Vasechkin is that hooligan, and Petrov is his accomplice. Petya and Vasya at first do not understand why Anton and the others are so in a hurry to help them, but figuring out what's wrong Vasechkin persuades the friend to exploit the image of the hooligans.

Anton decides that the energy of Vasechkin-hooligan needs to be redirected to the right track, and the pair begins to be persecuted by the heads of various sections and circles. Vasechkin decides to confess in everything only to Dashenka, the local winner of ballroom dancing, and Anka to the commander of the local detachment "Search". But they do not believe him - Dasha, being a romantic nature, believes that Vasechkin simply refuses to admit to being a bully, and Anka, who has a sense of collectivity in her heart, recognizes Vasechkin's accusation as an attempt at licentiousness, so that he will soon be accepted into the camp team. During all this, Petrov writes a letter to Masha Startseva, who at that moment is at the competitions. The guys try to confess to Alik, but he becomes frightened and even without listening to them, climbs onto the flagpole .

Realizing that the other guys will not listen to them, the couple decides to secretly escape from the camp. During the escape Petrov accidentally drops his letter to Masha. The letter is picked up by Olya Bobkina, who at that moment was hurrying to the meeting of the council of the squadron, where Anton and the others summed up the first results of their attempts to re-educate the "hooligan". She reads the letter and, arriving at the meeting, shows it to Anton. Realizing that they have been wrong all this time, Dasha and Anka are reproaching themselves for not believing Vasechkin, and the other guys are blaming Dobkina and Bobkina for what happened. In the midst of discussions, local sports judge Filipp rushes into the room, informing him that the real "Goose" has arrived at the camp. On this, Inna Andreevna completes her modern interpretation of the play, but the guys do not like this ending. Real Petrov and Vasechkin offer their finale.

The guys decide to escape from the camp along the beach, but they come across Goose. A fight breaks out between them. The whole camp runs to the noise of the struggle, and the exhausted and beaten guys fall from fatigue to the sand. They are taken to the medical center, where the children are discouraged. Although they are still all served (only now as a victim), the boys discover that they are already very tired of all this rest. Vasechkin at some point says that he dreams of a "game for life." Their discouragement fades to a bit when Masha Startseva comes to the camp. As a gift, she brings Don Quixote by Cervantes to the boys . Vasechkin, after reading it a little, says only one word to Petrov: "Idea! ".

=== "The Knight" ===
In the second part, the plot of Don Quixote by Cervantes is played out. Late at night Vasechkin comes to Inna Andreyevna with a request that she accept him as a knight. Inna Andreevna thinks that Petya is ill, but he starts to quote the monologue of Don Quixote in response. At some point, Inna Andreyevna starts to see Vasechkin in the image of the real Don Quixote, and as a result, being impressed, the teacher "knights" the boy. Early in the morning, Vasechkin pulls Petrov out of bed, telling him that he came up with a "game for life." They sit down on the tandem and go "to perform feats in honor of Dulcinea of Tobos" - Masha Startseva (they leave a note for her goodbye).

Vasechkin commits a lot of hooliganism, considering it a feat. On the contrary, Petrov, meanwhile, does several good deeds.

Petrov and Vasechkin find in the book a scene where Don Quixote takes a mill for a giant and decides to repeat this "feat", which turned out to be almost fatal for Vasechkin: after flying to the mill, Petya, along with the bike, hangs on her wing, then jumps off with the umbrella and flies away in an unknown direction. Petrov mourns his best friend and recognizes him as a real "knight", after which he mentally writes a letter to Masha, but unexpectedly finds Vasechkin in a well, unharmed. Vasya becomes a faithful assistant to Vasechkin, known as Sancho Panza .

Meanwhile, in the camp, the staff worries about the loss of Petrov and Vasechkin. Goose comes to Masha Startseva and finds out where they went. After Masha comes Inna Andreevna. Both begin to blame themselves for the loss of boys, and go in search of a convertible UAZ-469 car. They are joined by the Goose and Filipp, who hid in the car.

Petrov and Vasechkin go down to the road, see stones on the road, and 102-year-old oldman Nodar strides toward him. Petrov decides to help him in clearing the road. Vasechkin hurries to commit his next "feats", but instead disturbs a shepherd, whose dog he took for a wolf.

After meeting with oldman Nodar, the guys meet with small black-haired Manana, a local girl. Petrov and Vasechkin begin to behave as investigators, questioning her, if anyone has offended her, and as a result get acquainted with the grandmother of the girl, a lonely woman who immediately gives the work to the children. Together with Manana, Vasechkin goes for water, but on the way back he encounters the cow of Manana, and, taking it for a wild bull, fights with it, but eventually runs away and climbs up a tree. Together with Manana, they are found by Petrov and grandmother.

Further, Petrov and Vasechkin see mountains and climbers descending down the rope. One of the climbers explains to the guys that at the top of the mountain grows edelweiss, which according to tradition is given only to a beautiful woman. The guys had an idea to give edelweiss to Masha Startseva, and Vasechkin goes for the flower, but never reaches it. The climbers invite the guys to their lodgings for the night, and by the fire Vasechkin sings a song. During the performance, Vasechkin imagines a duel between Gus and Vasechkin for Masha, where Vasechkin receives a mortal wound, and Masha comes to mourn him. In the meantime, Inna Andreevna and Masha tearfully worries about the guys. And Masha imagines a similar duel between Goose and Vasechkin, but in her imagination she comes running and covers Vasechkin with her body, and receives a mortal wound - respectively, they lament her now.

In the morning Petrov ascends to the top of the mountain, takes the edelweiss and puts it in the tent. Eventually, Inna Andreevna, Masha and Goose find the tent with Petrov and Vasechkin, and before returning to the camp, Petrov gives Masha the flower.

== Cast ==
- Egor Druzhinin - Petya Vasechkin
- Dmitry Barkov - Vasya Petrov
- Boris Yanovsky - Anton
- Gogi Zambahidze - Artem
- Inna Alenikova - Inna Andreevna
- Inga Ilm - Masha Startseva
- Mikhail Salov - Alik
- Alexey Isaev - Lyosha Sidorov
- Anastasia Ulanova - Anka
- Natalia Kazakevich - Dasha
- Elena Delibash - Olya Dobkina
- Alexandra Kamona - Olya Bobkina
- Alexander Varakin - hooligan "Goose"
- Filipp Alenikov - Filipp
- Vladimir Shapovalov - Red
- Tamuna Beridze - Manana
- Sofiko Chiaureli - grandmother of Manana
- Irakli Uchaneyshvili - grandfather of Nodar
- Arkady Shalolashvili - shepherd
- Oleksiy Gorbunov - climber

== Production ==
The introduction was filmed after the completion of all filming by a large margin, so all the children either look older, or wear quite different hairstyles. According to unconfirmed reports, Alennikov had to finish these episodes, because the art council of Goskino rejected the whole first part, considering it an indigestible satire, and therefore he decided to make more references to the original play.
