= Volodymyr Huba =

Ukrainian composer (1938–2020)

Volodymyr Petrovych Huba Володимир Петрович Губа

Background information
- Born: December 22, 1938; Kiev, Ukrainian SSR, Soviet Union
- Died: December 3, 2020 (aged 81) Kyiv, Ukraine
- Genre: Classical
- Occupation: Composer

Volodymyr Petrovych Huba (Note: Ukrainian: Володимир Петрович Губа, romanized: Volodymyr Petrovych Huba) (22 December 1938 – 3 December 2020) was a Ukrainian composer and poet.

== Career ==
Born in Kyiv, he studied music at the Kyiv Conservatory (which is now the National Music Academy of Ukraine) with professors Levko Revutsky, B. Liatoshinskyi and A. Shtoharenko; he graduated with a degree in composition. He has worked as a music teacher, music editor, and a film maker. Films with his music have received awards at international Cinema Festivals. Huba was also awarded the title of the National Artist of Ukraine. He composed the music for some 70 films.
