= Chasing Two Hares =

1961 film by Viktor Ivanov

- Directed by: Viktor Ivanov
- Starring: Oleg Borisov; Marharyta Krynytsyna
- Cinematography: Vadym Illyenko
- Music by: Vadym Homolyaka
- Production company: Dovzhenko Film Studios
- Release date: December 21, 1961
- Running time: 72 min.
- Country: Soviet Union
- Languages: Ukrainian, Surzhyk, Russian (dubbed)

Chasing Two Hares (Ukrainian: «За двома зайцями», romanized: Za dvoma zaitsiamy, lit. 'Chasing Two Hares'; Russian: «За двумя зайцами», romanized: Za dvumya zaytsami), also known as A Kyiv Comedy, is a 1961 Soviet Ukrainian comedy film directed by Viktor Ivanov based on the eponymous play by Mykhailo Starytsky.

== Plot ==
In the late 19th century Kyiv, a frivolous barber named Svyryd Petrovych Holokhvosty (Oleg Borisov) goes bankrupt and is forced to close his shop. Upon learning that a Mr. Sirko (Mykola Yakovenko) is offering a dowry of ten thousand roubles for his unrefined and unattractive daughter, Pronya (Marharyta Krynytsyna), Svyryd decides to pay his debts by marrying her. Svyryd dupes a German creditor of his to finance the courtship. While showing off his new suit to friends in the park on Saint Volodymyr Hill, he sees and briefly flirts with the beautiful Halya (Nataliya Naum) before being chased away by her would be boyfriend, Stepan (Anatoliy Yurchenko).

That evening, Svyryd takes Pronya to the movies on a date and afterwards makes a false confession of love to her. She invites him to her house to propose. Later that night, while drinking with his friends, Svyryd boasts about his successful date with Pronya; and that once he gets the money, he will start an affair with a beauty. Svyryd meets Halya in an alley, falsely confesses his love to her, claims to be a rich suitor, and forces her into an embrace. Halya's mother, Sekleta Lymerykha (Nonna Koperzhynska), happens by and stops it. Sekleta threatens him and makes him swear on the steps of Saint Andrew's Church to marry Halya whose heart actually belongs to Stepan.

The next day, Sekleta, sister to Mrs. Sirko, lets herself into her sister's home where she insults them and is summarily thrown out. Svyryd narrowly misses Sekleta as he arrives to propose and receive the Sirkos' blessing for marriage with Pronya.

Some time later, he runs into Sekleta who forces him to share an open carriage to her house where guests soon arrive to celebrate Sekleta's name day. During the celebration, Svyryd flirts with Sister Meroniya, a pretty nun, and gets her to drink. As the party winds down, Sekleta announces the engagement of Halya and Svyryd. As she happens to be passing by her sister's house, Mrs. Sirko tries to partake in the festivities, but is stopped by Pronya who is embarrassed by such a lowbrow party. Sekleta laments that none of her relatives stopped by to visit on the special occasion which leads Svyryd to realize that Pronya and Halya are cousins! Halya runs from the gathering to her beloved Stepan who informs her that Svyryd is a fraud.

On the wedding day, curious friends of Sekleta discover Pronya is marrying Svyryd. A black cat crosses Svyryd's path on his way to Pronya's door, and he immediately trips and falls into the dirt, soiling and tearing his wedding attire. Sekleta's friends race to inform her before the wedding can take place. Sekleta halts the wedding party on the steps of Saint Andrew's Church and announces to everyone that Svyryd is in fact engaged to Halya. Pronya collapses upon realizing what has happened.

As Svyryd tries to walk away, Sekleta stops him and demands that he now marry Halya; however, creditors and bill collectors suddenly appear with proof that Svyryd is bankrupt who then leaves the scene with his friends.

== Cast ==
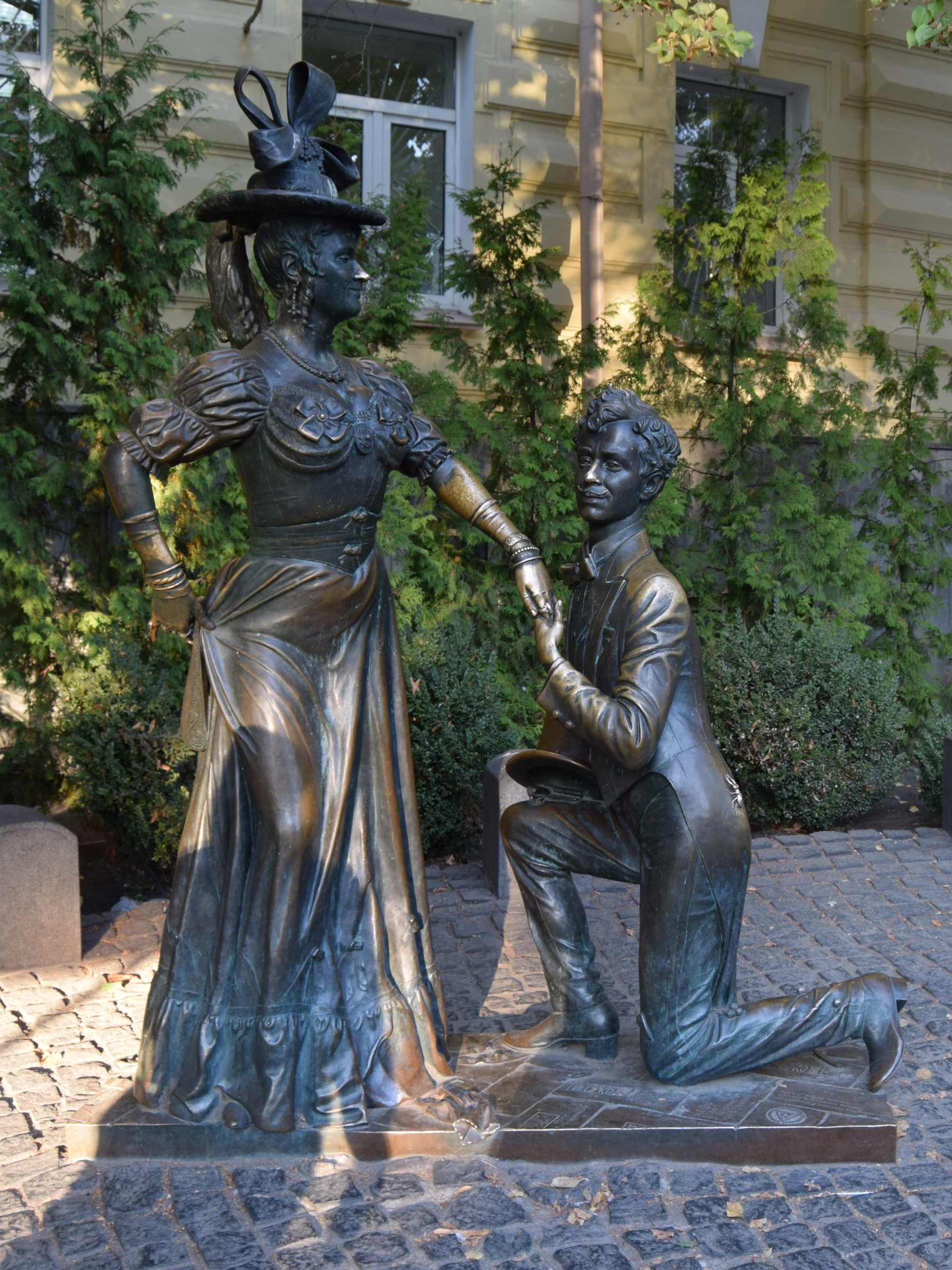
Monument to Pronya Prokopivna and Svyryd Holokhvastov near Andriivskyi Descent in Kyiv

- Oleg Borisov - Svyryd Petrovych Holokhvosty ("Galakhvastov")
- Marharyta Krynytsyna - Pronya Prokopivna Sirko ("Priska")
- Mykola Yakovenko - Prokip Svyrydovych Sirko, father of Pronya
- Hanna Kushnirenko - Yavdokha Pylypivna Sirko, mother of Pronya
- Nonna Koperzhynska - Sekleta Pylypivna Lymerykha, sister of Yavdokha Pylypivna
- Nataliya Naum - Halya, daughter of Sekleta Pylypivna
- Anatoliy Yurchenko - Stepan, the groom of Halya
- Kostiantyn Yershov - Dancer, friend of Holokhvosty
- Tayisiya Lytvynenko - Khymka, servant of the Sirkos
- Olga Wickland - Mademoiselle Ninon, hostess of the guesthouse

== Dubbing ==
The film was shot in Ukrainian language at the Dovzhenko Film Studio, as it was planned to be shown only on the territory of the Ukrainian SSR. Later, when the film gained enormous popularity, it was partially re-dubbed by the same actors into Russian, and was released into the All-Union distribution. The original Ukrainian audio track was considered lost for a long time, but was found in the Mariupol film fund in 2013. On October 27, 2013, the film with original Ukrainian-language dubbing was presented to the general public in Kyiv.
