= Ukrainian Association of Cinematographers =

Logo of the association

The Ukrainian Association of Cinematographers (Ukrainian: Національна спілка кінематографістів України, romanized: Natsionalna spilka kinematohrafistiv Ukrainy, NSKU, НСКУ) is an organization that was established after the Order of the Council of Ministers of Ukrainian SSR in 1957.

It was named at first as Orgbureau and constitutionalised on its first organizational convocation in January 1963.

Serhii Bordeniuk is a Chairman of the Association which consists of 1223 people.

Since 2014, the Ukrainian Association of Cinematographers is awarding the annual prize for the best films of Ukrainian production.

== History ==
The Association was created in 1957 and constitutionalised in 1963. The first director of the association was Taras Levchuk and the association headquarters was decided to be in Kyiv.

In 1971 the association opened another office in Odessa and became a part of the Soviet Association of Cinematographers. Its membership listed around 500 individuals at that time. Together with the State Committee of the Council of Ministers in regards to cinematography the association was publishing its monthly issue of Novyny Kinoekranu (News of Cinemascreen) since 1961.

On October 7, 1997, the Verkhovna Rada of Ukraine adopted the Law "On Professional Creative Workers and Creative Unions". After that, the National Association of Cinematographers has changed its Charter.

In 2000, the Resolution of the Cabinet of Ministers of Ukraine provided the status of the National Union.

Since 1961, the Association of Cinematographers of Ukraine issued a month "News of a movies" (Ukrainian: Новини кіноекрану) together with the State Committee of the Council of Ministers in Cinematography Affairs.

Heads of the Association were Serhiy Trymbach and Oles Yanchuk.

The Association supported the production of The Trial: The State of Russia vs Oleg Sentsov, which was released in 2017. The film pertains to the arrest of Oleg Sentsov, a Ukrainian filmmaker, by Russian special services. The Ukrainian Association of Cinematographers called for Vladimir Putin to assist in Sentsov's release.

On June 27, 2017, the Plenum of the Board of the Association appointed Olena Parfenyuk a Head duty executive.

On August 28, 2017, at an extraordinary congress, Oles Yanchuk, was elected a head of the Association.

On 5 October 2023 Serhii Bordeniuk was elected as a new chairman of The Ukrainian Association of Cinematographers

== Notable members ==
- Ivan Drach
- Bohdan Stupka
- Myroslav Slaboshpytskyi
- Vadim Skuratovsky
- Nikolay Olyalin
- Ihor Kobrin
- Viktor Ivanov
