= Viktor Zhdanov (actor) =

Ukrainian actor (born 1968)

- Ві́ктор Жда́нов
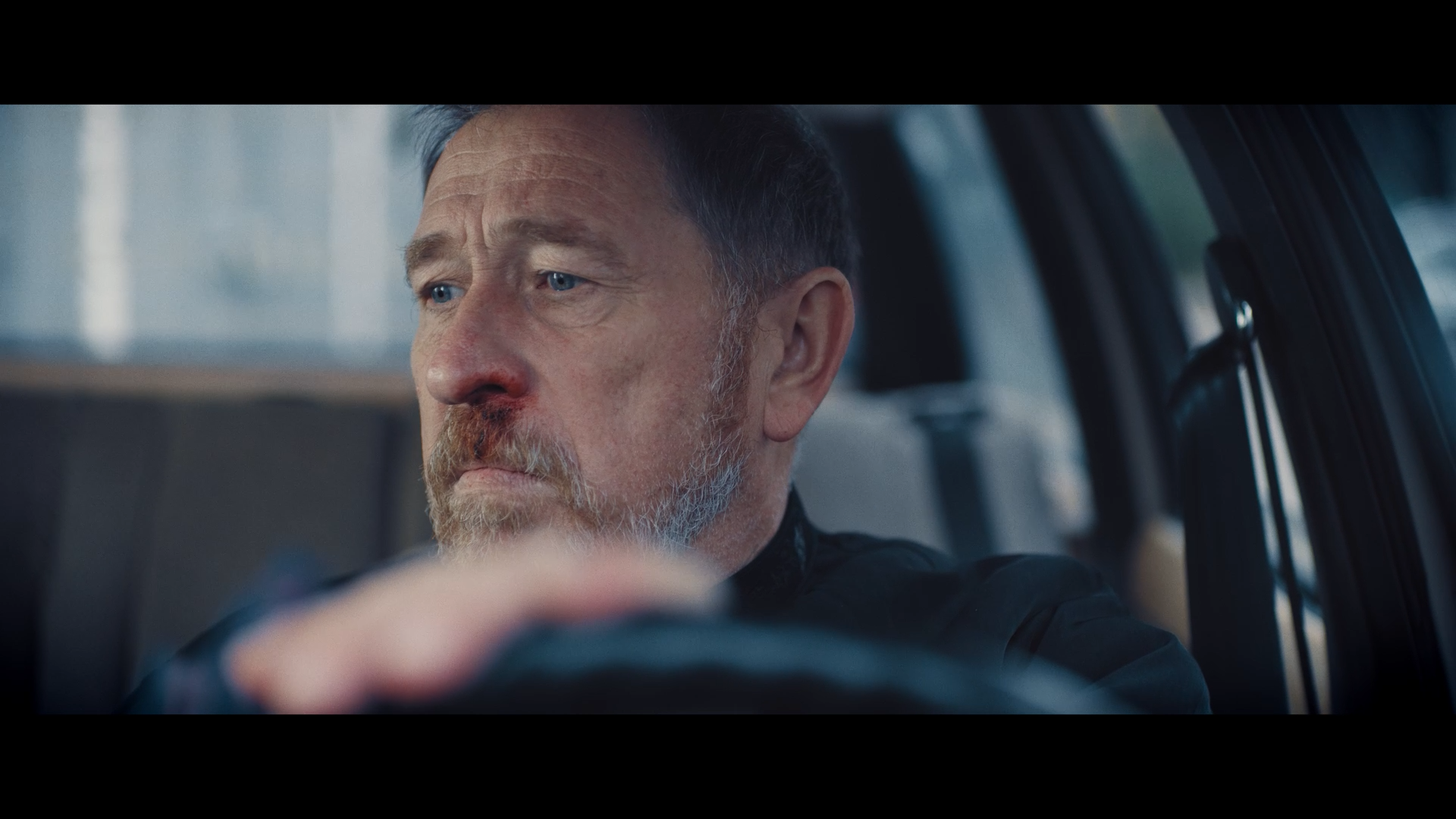
- Born: March 3, 1968 (age 58); Kyselivka, Kherson Oblast, Ukrainian Soviet Socialist Republic
- Occupation: Actor
- Spouse: Olena Khokhlatkina
- Children: 2, including Oksana Zhdanova
- Honours: Merited Artist of Ukraine

Viktor Petrovych Zhdanov (Ukrainian: Ві́ктор Петро́вич Жда́нов; born March 3, 1968) is a Ukrainian theater, film and television actor. He is a Merited Artist of Ukraine.

== Biography ==
Viktor Petrovych Zhdanov was born on March 3, 1968, in the village of Kyselivka in Kherson Oblast. He graduated from the Kherson Vocational College of Culture and Arts in 1986. From 1986 to 1988, he was an actor of the Kherson Puppet Theater. From 1988 to 1997, he was part of the Regional Academic Musical-Dramatic Theatre Mykola Kulish. From 1997 to 1998, he was part of the Maikop Russian Drama Theater in Adygea. In 2000, he joined the Donetsk National Academic Ukrainian Musical and Drama Theatre. He and his family moved to Kyiv after the occupation of Donetsk in 2014. That same year, he began working for the Kyiv Academic Theatre of Drama and Comedy on the left bank of Dnieper. He began acting in films after arriving in Kyiv. Since 2022, he works at the Ivan Franko National Academic Drama Theater.

== Personal life ==
Zhdanov is married with Olena Khokhlatkina. They have a son named Pavlo and daughter Oksana Zhdanova.

== Credits ==
=== Theater ===
Year	Title	Role	Venue	Ref(s)
	Dear Pamela	Doctor	Ivan Franko National Academic Drama Theater	
	Ground	Father	Ivan Franko National Academic Drama Theater	
	The Resistible Rise of Arturo Ui	Bowl	Ivan Franko National Academic Drama Theater	
	The Visit	Teacher	Ivan Franko National Academic Drama Theater	

=== Film ===
Year	Title	Role	Ref(s)
2017	Cyborgs	Staryi	
2018	Volcano	Vova	
2021	God Will Forgive	Chaplain	
2026	Gorky Resort	Tseytlin	

=== Television ===
Year	Title	Role	Ref(s)
2021	Kriposna. Zhadana Lyubov		

== Awards and honors ==
Zhdanov won the Best Actor category at the Golden Key Festival for his role as Holstomer in the play Istoriya konya (Ukrainian: Історія коня). He won the Best Supporting Actor category at the Theatrical Donbass festival and the international Melpomene of Tavria festival for his role as Osgood Fielding III in the play U dzhazi til'ky divchata (Ukrainian: У джазі тільки дівчата). In 2009, he was named Merited Artist of Ukraine. In 2018, he earned a Golden Dzyga award for Best Supporting Actor for his role in the 2017 film Cyborgs. In 2020, he earned a Golden Dzyga award for Best Supporting Actor for his role in the 2018 film Volcano.
