= The Konotop Witch (film) =

- Directed by: Andriy Kolesnyk
- Written by: Yaroslav Voytseshek
- Produced by: Iryna Kostiuk
- Starring: Tetiana Malkova; Taras Tsymbaliuk; Olena Khokhlatkina; Pavlo Vyshniakov; Ivan Sharan; Yaroslav Shakhtorin
- Cinematography: Kostiantyn Ponomariov
- Music by: Oleksandr Chorny
- Production company: Film.UA
- Distributed by: Film.UA Distribution
- Release date: 22 August 2024
- Running time: 100 minutes
- Country: Ukraine
- Languages: Ukrainian; Russian
- Box office: ₴57.4 million

The Konotop Witch is a 2024 Ukrainian mystical horror film directed by Andriy Kolesnyk, produced by Iryna Kostiuk, and written by Yaroslav Voytseshek. The composer was Oleksandr Chorny, with casting handled by Olena Shliakhova. Visual effects were created by Postmodern Postproduction. The costume designer was Iryna iSky, a military photographer from the 59th Brigade named after Yakiv Handziuk. The film's soundtrack features a song by Zlata Ognevich.

The film premiered at the Odesa International Film Festival on 16 July 2024 and was released in Ukrainian cinemas on 22 August 2024.

== Plot ==
The film follows a witch from Konotop who has abandoned her supernatural powers and lives with her boyfriend, Andriy. Following the Russian invasion of Ukraine in 2022, Russian forces enter the city, and Andriy is killed while attempting to protect her. She subsequently regains her powers and uses them to take revenge on the Russian soldiers responsible for his death.

== Cast ==
Actor	Role
Tetiana Malkova	Olena
Taras Tsymbaliuk	Andriy
Olena Khokhlatkina	Yevdokiya
Pavlo Vyshniakov	Rovny
Ivan Sharan	Bandos
Yaroslav Shakhtorin	Kartavy
Artem Sahitov	Ufa
Serhiy Sosnovtsev	Rusik
Vladyslav Verbytsky	Kalash
Rostyslav Fomenko	Zayets
Mykyta Slobodiuk	Maly
Mykola Holovchak	Sych
Serhiy Anipchenko	Katok
Daniil Kino	Ryzhy
French Bulldog Charlie	Ozzy
Iryna Rozhdestvenska	Woman on Bicycle
Oleksandra Pankova	Katya
Viktor Zhdanov	Old Man
Marharyta Liubomska	Neighbor
Volodymyr Rashchuk	AFU Soldier
Daniel Salem	AFU Soldier
Nazar Grabar	AFU Soldier
Oleksandr Pecherytsia	AFU Soldier
Ernest Liubarchuk	Child

== Production ==
Filming began on November 23, 2023. The filmmakers drew inspiration from ancient Ukrainian legends and beliefs, as well as a real incident early in the 2022 Russian invasion when a Konotop woman cursed the occupiers, proclaiming that "every second woman in Konotop is a witch". The teaser for the film was released on June 22, 2023.

== Box office ==
Over the course of 14 weeks in Ukrainian cinemas, 358,627 tickets were sold for the film, and box office takings reached 57,443,591 UAH. Thanks to this achievement, the film has made it into the top three horror films in the history of Ukrainian cinema.

In 2024, The Konotop Witch ranked ninth in the top 10 films at the Ukrainian box office.

== Merchandise ==
In late 2024, a card-based board game inspired by the film, titled The Konotop Witch, was released by the publisher Rozum. The game was designed by Ostap Hevko.

== See also ==
- The Witch of Konotop
