= Olena Khokhlatkina =

Ukrainian actress (born 1968)

- Олена Хохлаткіна
- Born: January 28, 1968 (age 58); Kherson Oblast, Ukrainian Soviet Socialist Republic
- Education: Kherson Cultural and Educational School
- Occupation: Actress
- Years active: 1989–present
- Spouse: Viktor Zhdanov
- Children: 2, including Oksana Zhdanova
- Honours: Merited Artist of Ukraine; People's Artist of Ukraine

Olena Antoniivna Khokhlatkina (Ukrainian: Олена Анатоліївна Хохлаткіна; born January 28, 1968) is a Ukrainian theater, film and television actress. She holds the titles Merited Artist of Ukraine and People's Artist of Ukraine.

== Biography ==
Olena Antoniivna Khokhlatkina was born on January 28, 1968, in Kherson Oblast. She graduated from the Kherson Cultural and Educational School in 1989. From 1989 to 1999, she was an actress of the Kherson Regional Ukrainian Music and Drama Theater. From 1997 to 1998, she was part of a Russian drama theater in Maykop. In the early 2000s, she accepted an invitation from the Donetsk National Academic Ukrainian Musical and Drama Theatre and moved. She and her family were forced to leave Donetsk after the occupation of Donetsk in 2014. She moved to Kyiv and became an actress of the Ivan Franko National Academic Drama Theater in 2015.

== Personal life ==
Khokhlatkina is married with Viktor Zhdanov. They have a son and daughter actress Oksana Zhdanova. She is fluent in Russian and Ukrainian.

== Credits ==
=== Theater ===
Year	Title	Role	Venue	Ref(s)
	Gelsomino in the country of liars	Domisol	Ivan Franko National Academic Drama Theater	
	Dear Pamela	Pamela	Ivan Franko National Academic Drama Theater	
	Lymerivna	Shkandybyha	Ivan Franko National Academic Drama Theater	
	Three Comrades	Matilda Stoss	Ivan Franko National Academic Drama Theater	
	Krum	Krum's Mother	Ivan Franko National Academic Drama Theater	
	Peer Gynt	Ase	Ivan Franko National Academic Drama Theater	
	Sing, Lola, Sing!	Guste, actress, Lola's friend	Ivan Franko National Academic Drama Theater	
	Caligula	Helikon	Ivan Franko National Academic Drama Theater	
	The Witch of Konotop	Zubikha	Ivan Franko National Academic Drama Theater	
	Smooth Operators	Klavdiia Ivanivna	Ivan Franko National Academic Drama Theater	
	Forest	Ulita	Ivan Franko National Academic Drama Theater	

=== Film ===
Year	Title	Role	Ref(s)
	Ya pratsyuyu na tsvyntari		
2022	Pamfir	Main character's mother	

=== Television ===
Year	Title	Role	Ref(s)
2020	Doctor Vipa		

== Awards and honors ==
In 1996, Khokhlatkina was named Merited Artist of Ukraine. In 2008, she was named People's Artist of Ukraine. She earned a Kyiv Pectoral Award for Best Supporting Actress in the play Forest. In 2018, she earned a Kyiv Pectoral Award for her role in the play Dear Pamela (2019).
