= Volcano (2018 film) =

2018 Ukrainian drama film

- Official poster
- Ukrainian: Вулкан
- Directed by: Roman Bondarchuk
- Written by: Daria Averchenko; Roman Bondarchuk; Alla Tyutyunnyk
- Produced by: Olena Yershova
- Starring: Viktor Zhdanov; Serhiy Stepansky; Khrystyna Deilyk
- Cinematography: Vadym Ilkov
- Music by: Anton Baibakov
- Production company: Tato Film
- Release dates: 1 July 2018 (KVIFF); 4 April 2019 (Ukraine)
- Running time: 106 min.
- Country: Ukraine
- Budget: ₴10,000,000

Volcano (in Ukrainian: «Вулкан», romanized: Vulkan; in German: Vulcan) is a 2018 Ukrainian-German-Monaco drama film, and the feature directorial debut of Roman Bondarchuk. Through the character Lukas, an interpreter who is stranded in the region he was to help monitor for a security organization, the film examines the lives of people on the southern Ukrainian steppe who live in anarchic freedom, seemingly forgotten by the outside world.

The film premiered at the Karlovy Vary International Film Festival (KVIFF) on 1 July 2018 in the East of the West program. It won several awards at international film festivals, including the Grand Prize at festivals in Armenia, Croatia and Morocco. The film has been noted for its stunning visuals and a documentary feel attained through cinéma vérité techniques and the casting of non-actors. Bondarchuk received the Shevchenko National Prize for directing the film.

== Plot ==
Lukas, an interpreter for the OSCE (Organization for Security and Co-operation in Europe), drives three colleagues into the deserted countryside of the southern Ukrainian steppe for an inspection tour of military checkpoints near the Crimean border.

Their car breaks down and with no cell phone reception, they find themselves at Beryslav, a district of Ukraine in Kherson Oblast. Here, Lukas walks in search of assistance but fails to find any. On his return, the car with his colleagues has mysteriously disappeared – though he has the keys.

Left alone, Lukas is picked up in a tank by Vova, and brought to a village overlooking the Kakhovka Reservoir. Once at the village, Vova and his daughter Marushka decide to host Lukas who during his stay is distressed by unfortunate events but each time is unexpectedly saved by Vova.

Lukas's life changes while living with Vova, as he realises the feeling of happiness he thought he lost. The more he stays with Vova the more he understands the anarchic life of the village, detached from any common structures. Although Lukas dislikes Vova's eccentricities, he needs his support in the village where drunken gangs carry assault rifles, the police rob detainees, slave labour is practiced, and nobody has a conventional job.

Notwithstanding the village's image, Lukas begins to understand the people through their collective past. Also, he finds himself interested in Vova's eccentricity and falls in love with his daughter Marushka. Finally, Lukas joins Vova in one of his get-rich schemes, diving to one of the drowned villages in the reservoir.

== Cast ==
Only two professional actors are in the cast: Viktor Zhdanov and Khrystyna Deilyk. Volcano is Deilyk's film debut. Serhiy Stepansky was known to the film-makers from his work as a sound director. The rest of the cast were found by Tatiana Simon from villages around the shooting location.

- Viktor Zhdanov as Vova
- Serhiy Stepansky as Lukas
- Khrystyna Deilyk as Marushka

== Production ==
=== Writing and development ===
The script began development in the early 2010s, initially following a foreigner who was stranded at the Odesa airport due to volcanic eruptions in Iceland, and who then began traveling into the Ukrainian countryside. Writers Daria Averchenko, Roman Bondarchuk and Alla Tyutyunnyk greatly updated the plot following the Euromaidan movement, the 2014 Ukrainian revolution, the Russian annexation of Crimea and the War in Donbass, but kept the title "Volcano". Averchenko noted that the title symbolized the sudden cataclysm that can occur in a person's life.

Bondarchuk and Averchenko have backgrounds in documentary-making, and had originally envisioned the project as a documentary. The character Vova is based on Averchenko's uncle. The writers based several other characters on family members in Kherson. The film carries a dedication in memory of those whose villages were flooded by the creation of the Kakhovka Reservoir.

In 2014, the production secured half of its 10,000,000 Ukrainian hryvnia budget from the Ukrainian State Film Agency. It was produced by Olena Yershova of Tato Film (Ukraine) with co-producers Averchenko of South (Ukraine), Tanja Georgieva-Waldhauer of Elemag Pictures (Germany) and Michel Merkt of KNM (Monaco).

=== Filming ===
The film was shot in Beryslav, Kherson Oblast, Ukraine, on the Dnieper river, one hour north of Crimea. The main camera was a Red Epic with Ultra Prime lenses; night exteriors were filmed with a Sony Alpha 7. All shooting was from tripod or shoulder mounts. The script was significantly reworked during filming.

Post-production was completed at Arri Media in Germany. According to Bondarchuk, the most complicated shots were the underwater scenes. Bondarchuk also directed a music video for "DakhaBrakha", a song which is used for the closing credits of the film.

== Release ==
=== Premiere and festival tour ===
Volcano was shown at more than 40 film festivals. An early version of the film was shown in July 2017 at the Karlovy Vary International Film Festival (KVIFF) and the Odesa International Film Festival in the Works in Progress sections. The film had its world premiere on 1 July 2018 at KVIFF, in the East of the West competition program. It was also included in the 2018 competition programs of Filmfest München and the Odesa International Film Festival.

=== Theatrical ===
The film was to have been released in Ukraine by distributor Arthouse Traffic on 21 February 2019. However, the distributor was changed to Ukrainian Film Distribution and the release was pushed back to 4 April 2019. Internationally, the film was distributed by Berlin-based Pluto Film Distribution Network.

=== Streaming and television ===
The film was released for streaming in Eastern Europe on HBO Go in early 2019. In March 2020, the film was released on the Takflix streaming service. The film's television premiere was on the Ukrainian public television channel UA:Kultura on 27 June 2019. It was broadcast following Kherson Region on the Volcano (Ukrainian: "Херсонщина на вулкані"), a documentary shot by Bondarchuk and the Volcano crew over seven days.

== Reception ==
=== Critical response ===
The film has received generally positive reviews in domestic and international media. On the review aggregator website Rotten Tomatoes, the film has a score of 83% fresh based on six reviews.

Dmitry Desyaterik of The Day (Odesa-Kyiv) felt that any lacking of the screenplay was offset by Bondarchuk's ability to compose the beautiful shots, and his familiarity with the ancestral homeland in which he often films. Two reviewers for Vertigo.com.ua were unsettled by the theme that civilization anywhere can break and throw people into anarchy. Sasha Rink alternated from viewing the film as surreal with "hyperbolized parodies" to documentary-realism – emphasized by rough shots and editing – which captured human essence. Jura Povorznyk felt that the film lacked art despite its great concept and cinematography, and found its documentary feel to leave an unsettling aftereffect at the reality of the world and human nature.

Lukyan Galkin of Moviegram called Volcano "the most Ukrainian film in recent years". He compared the film to Wild Field, but with "Ukrainianness" completely shaping it, with magic realism, social absurdity and powerful unseen dangers at every turn. A review for Pryamiy kanal praised the cinematography with its attention on detail after detail, the casting of the leads, and the film's contribution to Ukrainian poetic cinema.

Marina Moinikhan described the film as an Acid Western with the protagonist's "psychedelic dissolution" of identity in a midlife crisis. Igor Grabovich wrote for Detector Media that the film blends genres from horror to western, and black comedy to road film, and praised production designer Kirill Shuvalov and cinematographer Vadym Ilkov. He found the film to be a hopeful modern fairy tale as Lukas is symbolically reborn in the countryside. Grabovich called it "a film about the eternal" which survives the fall of civilization.

Demetrios Matheou of Screen Daily noted the film "ought to be fictional but rings true", juxtaposing brutal situations with alluring imagery, while realism is achieved with cinéma vérité techniques. He particularly noted the casting of non-actors, with Stepansky's underplayed reactions drawing in the audience. Vassilis Economou of Cineuropa wrote that the movie was grounded by its "documentary feel" even when the narrative approached absurdity, allowing fantasy and reality to exist in balance. He felt that Bondarchuk was telling his own personal story as a Kherson native in his thirties raised in Kyiv. Stephen Dalton of The Hollywood Reporter called the film "a poetically surreal love letter" to the Kherson region, creating a world of "alien beauty".

Alissa Simon of Variety praised the visuals and the score by Anton Baibakov, and listed Bondarchuk among the three most-intriguing Ukrainian filmmakers. Meredith Taylor of Filmuforia wrote that Volcano had one of the most breathtaking opening sequences in 2018 film. She felt that the film captured the dichotomy of modern Ukraine, "hating Russians for stealing their country" but nostalgic for Soviet-era authority and security.

=== Awards and nominations ===
Bondarchuck received the Shevchenko National Prize, Ukraine's highest state prize for cultural works, for directing Volcano. The film won the Grand Prize at international film festivals in Armenia, Croatia and Morocco.

List of awards and nominations
Year	Ceremony	Category	Nominee or recipient	Result	Ref
2015	Coronation of the Word (Ukraine)	Best Screenplay	Daria Averchenko, Roman Bondarchuk and Alla Tyutyunnyk	Won	
2017	8th Odesa International Film Festival (Ukraine)	Best Work in Progress	Volcano	Won	
2018	53rd Karlovy Vary International Film Festival (Czech Republic)	East to West Award (Czech: Na východ od Západu)	Volcano	Nominated	
2018	15th Yerevan International Film Festival (Armenia)	Golden Apricot grand prize	Volcano	Won	
2018	36th Filmfest München (Germany)	International Independents	Volcano	Nominated	
2018	25th Palić European Film Festival (Serbia)	Parallels and Encounters	Volcano	Nominated	
2018	9th Odesa International Film Festival (Ukraine)	Golden Duke	Volcano	Nominated	
2018	1st Eurasia International Film Festival (Kazakhstan)	Best Director	Roman Bondarchuk	Won	
2018	36th Vancouver International Film Festival (Canada)	Most Popular International Feature	Volcano	Nominated	
2018	23rd Split Film Festival (Croatia)	Grand Prize	Volcano	Won	
2018	2nd Pingyao International Film Festival (China)	Audience Jury Prize	Volcano	Won	
2018	First National Film Critics Award (Ukraine)	Kinokolo Award for Best Feature Film	Volcano	Nominated	
2018	First National Film Critics Award (Ukraine)	Best Actor	Sergey Stepansky	Nominated	
2018	25th Listapad (Belarus)	Best Sound / Score	Anton Baibakov	Won	
2018	25th Rabat International Film Festival (Monaco)	Grand Prize	Volcano	Won	
2018	49th International Film Festival of India	Special jury prize for a directorial debut	Volcano	Won	
2019	Minneapolis–Saint Paul International Film Festival (United States)	Special Jury Award – Emerging Filmmaker	Volcano	Won	
2019	33rd Fribourg International Film Festival (Switzerland)	Commendation of the Ecumenical Jury	Volcano	Won	
