= Alona Tymoshenko =

Ukrainian film producer

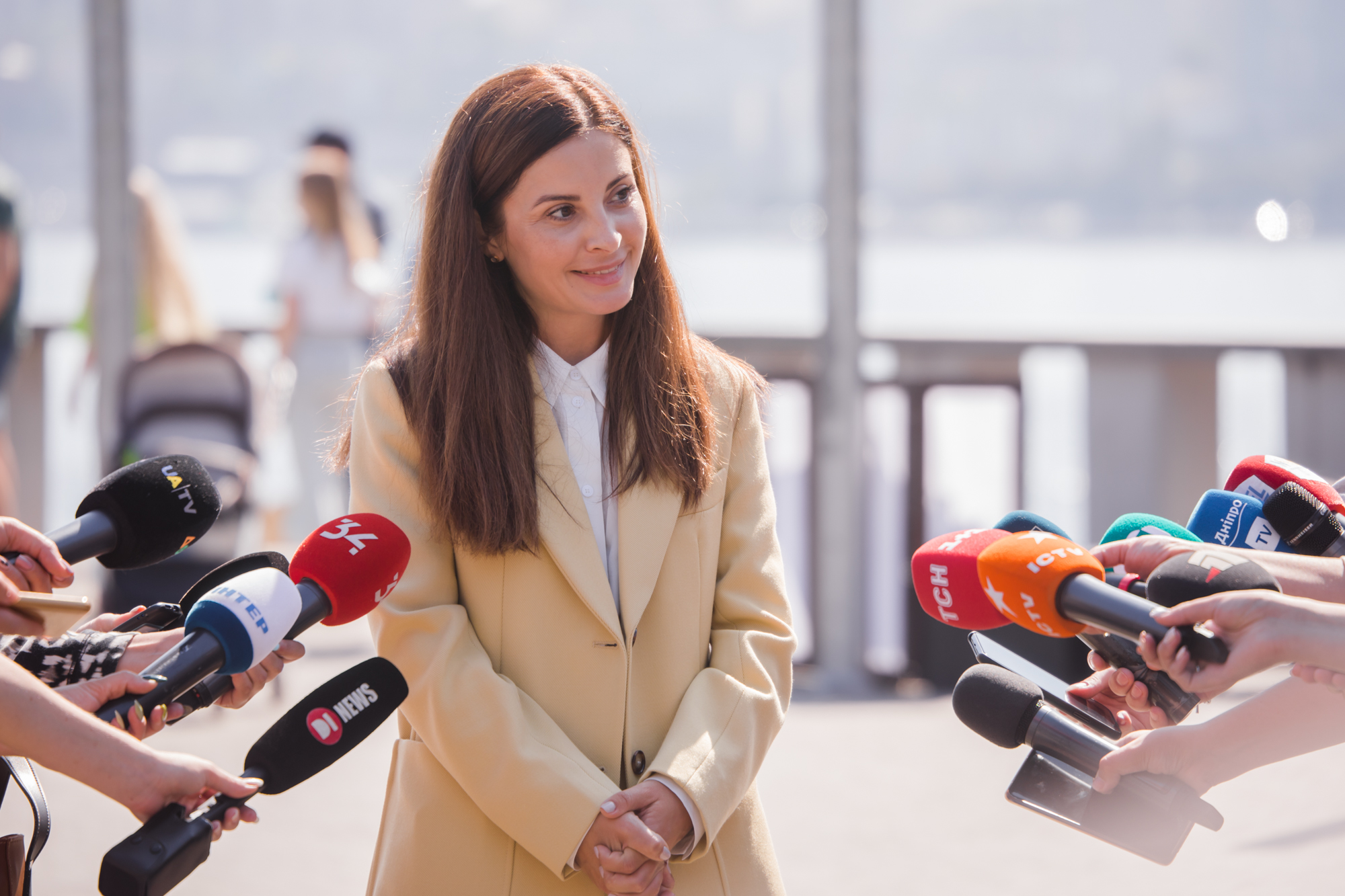
- Tymoshenko in 2021
- Born: June 9, 1985 (age 41)
- Education: Kyiv National University of Culture and Arts
- Occupation: film producer
- Spouse: Kyrylo Tymoshenko

Alona Tymoshenko (born 9 June 1985) is a Ukrainian film producer, producer at the production company Dream Film, film educator, and industry expert. She is the founder of the Ukrainian Film School and a producer of contemporary Ukrainian feature films and television projects. Tymoshenko is regarded as part of a new generation of Ukrainian producers combining industry education, independent production, and international positioning of Ukrainian cinema. Her production credits include the 2022 film Pamfir, which premiered at the 75th Cannes Film Festival, and she has served as an expert for the State Film Agency of Ukraine.

== Early life and education ==
Alona Tymoshenko was born in Ukraine on June 9, 1985. She graduated from the Kyiv National University of Culture and Arts, where she studied television and film production.

She began her professional career in television, working in casting and production, gaining practical experience that later informed her work as a producer and film educator.

== Dream Film and Film Education ==
Tymoshenko is a producer at Dream Film, a production company involved in the development and production of feature films and television projects.

In 2016, she founded the Ukrainian Film School, a private educational institution focused on professional training in film and television disciplines including directing, acting, cinematography, screenwriting, and producing. The school has trained thousands of students and contributed to the development of Ukraine’s contemporary film workforce.

Her professional model integrates education with active production practice, creating a direct pathway between talent development and the film industry.

== Producing Career ==
=== Pamfir (2022) ===
Tymoshenko is credited as a producer of Pamfir (2022), directed by Dmytro Sukholytkyy-Sobchuk. The film premiered at the 75th Cannes Film Festival in the Directors’ Fortnight program on May 22, 2022. Pamfir received international critical recognition and was widely discussed as part of the global visibility of contemporary Ukrainian cinema.

=== Uncle Tolya (2024) ===
She is credited as a producer of Uncle Tolya (2024), a short film listed among her production credits.

=== Vitya (2025) ===
Tymoshenko is credited as a producer of the television series Vitya (2025).

=== On Drive (2026) ===
In 2026, Tymoshenko produced On Drive, a Ukrainian action film set in frontline Kharkiv, combining street racing themes with a dramatic portrayal of youth and identity during wartime.

== Sounds of the City Project ==
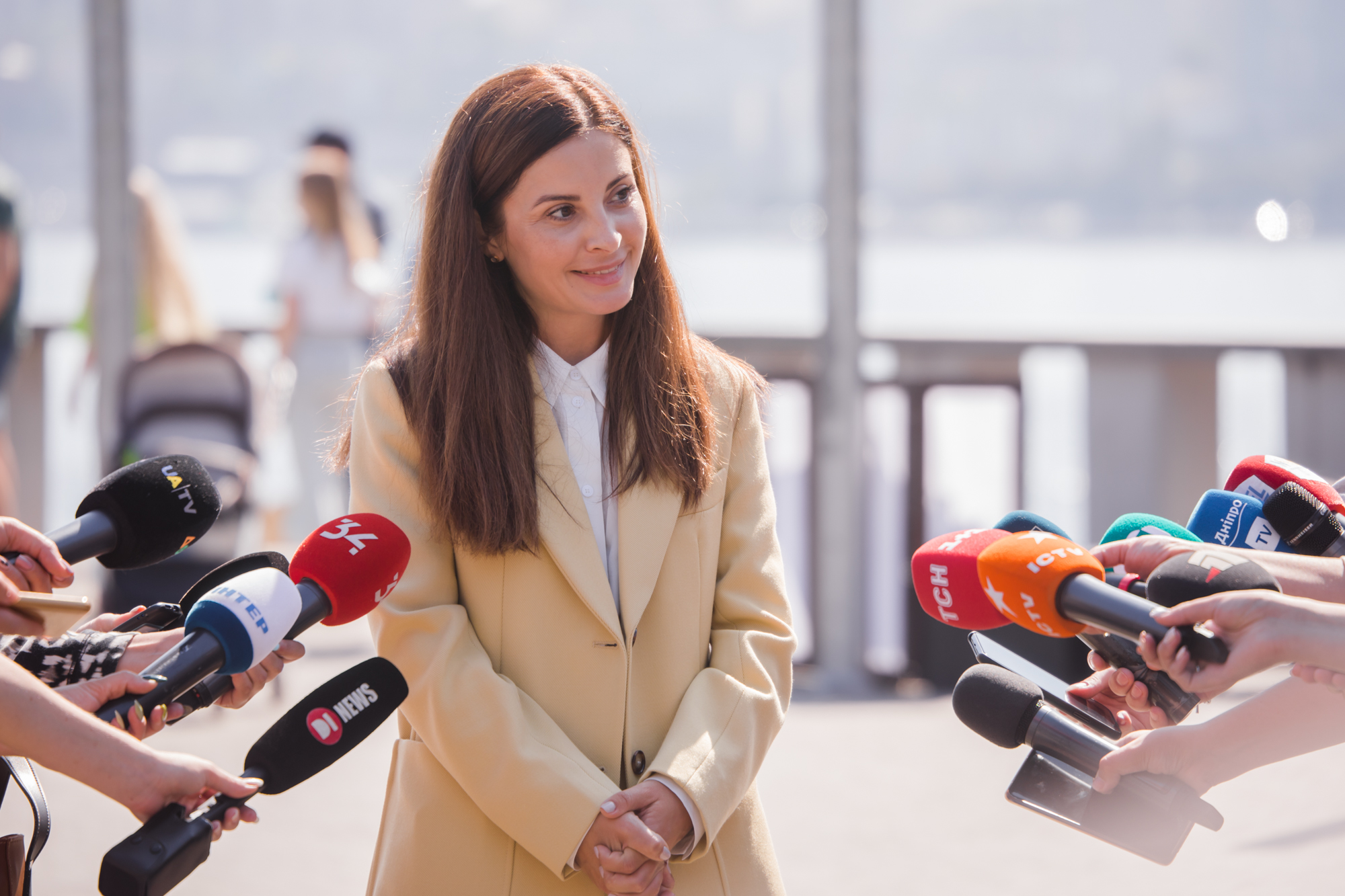
Alona Tymoshenko during the presentation of the cultural project “Sounds of the City”

Tymoshenko initiated and developed the cultural project “Sounds of the City”, which focused on recording and preserving authentic urban sounds from different Ukrainian cities. The project was created as an artistic and documentary initiative reflecting contemporary Ukrainian urban identity through sound.

== Industry Role and State Film Agency of Ukraine ==
Tymoshenko has served as an expert for the State Film Agency of Ukraine (Derzhkino), participating in professional evaluation processes within the national film funding system.

Her involvement in state-level film industry structures further positioned her within the institutional framework of Ukrainian cinema development.

== Role in Contemporary Ukrainian Cinema ==
Tymoshenko belongs to a generation of Ukrainian producers working during a period of transformation in the national film industry, particularly throughout the years of war. Her work spans:

- development of professional film education infrastructure,
- production of contemporary Ukrainian films with both artistic and commercial orientation,
- participation in broader discussions about the sustainability and future of Ukrainian cinema.

Her strategy integrates education, production, and audience engagement within a single professional ecosystem.

== Selected Filmography ==
Year	Title	Role	Type / Notes
2022	Pamfir	Producer	Feature film
2024	Uncle Tolya	Producer	Short film
2025	Vitya	Producer	Television series / project
2026	On Drive	Producer	Feature film

== Personal life ==
Tymoshenko is married to Kyrylo Tymoshenko, a Ukrainian politician and public figure. They have one son named Semen.
