= Hryhorii Kvitka-Osnovianenko =

Ukrainian writer, journalist, and playwright (1778–1843)

Hryhorii Kvitka-Osnovianenko Григорій Квітка-Основ'яненко
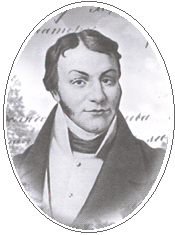
- Kvitka-Osnovianenko, c. 1810
- Born: Hryhorii Fedorovych Kvitka; 18 November [O.S. 29 November] 1778; Osnova, Sloboda Ukraine Governorate, Russian Empire (now within Kharkiv, Ukraine)
- Died: 8 August [O.S. 20 August] 1843 (aged 64); Kharkiv, Russian Empire
- Resting place: Honcharivka, Kharkiv
- Citizenship: Russian Empire
- Occupation: Writer
- Relatives: Fedir Kvitka (father); Andriy Kvitka (brother)
- Writing career
- Pen name: Hrytsko Osnovianenko (Грицько Основ'яненко)
- Language: Ukrainian; Russian
- Period: Classicism
- Genres: Fable, tale, short story, dramatic works

Signature
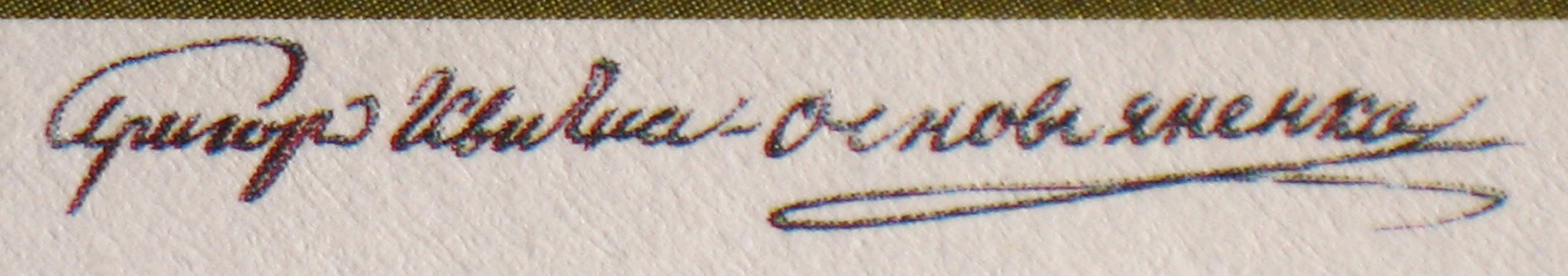

Hryhorii Fedorovych Kvitka-Osnovianenko (Ukrainian: Григорій Федорович Квітка-Основ'яненко; 29 November 1778 – 20 August 1843) was a Ukrainian writer, journalist, and playwright. Founder of Ukrainian classicist prose. He was born in the vicinity of Kharkiv.

== Life and work ==
Hryhorii Kvitka-Osnovianenko was born in 1778 in the village of Osnova, Sloboda Ukraine Governorate (now within the city of Kharkiv), to a family of Ukrainian nobility. His uncle Illia Kvitka researched the settlement of Sloboda Ukraine, becoming a pioneer of historical studies in the region. He adopted the pen name "Osnovianenko," a reference to the village of his birth, when he embarked on his literary career.

A deeply religious person, at the age of 23 Kvitka entered a monastery, but returned to civil life four years later. Starting from 1812, Hryhorii Kvitka-Osnovianenko began his social activities, being appointed the director of a new regular lay theatre which opened in Kharkiv. The love for theatre, which he preserved through all his life, led him to become an author of theatrical drama works. In 1841 he wrote his "Kharkiv Theatre History". Along with his theatrical activities, Kvitka-Osnovianenko also engaged in philanthropy and became the founder of an Institute for Noble Maidens. He also served as the local Marshal of the Nobility and headed the chamber of Kharkiv's criminal court.

Starting his career as an author, in 1820-1822 Kvitka-Osnovianenko published his first works in Russian language. In this he followed the steps of the majority of his contemporaries in the Ukrainian literary scene. However, with time Kvitka-Osnovianenko became one of the earliest proponents of Ukrainian as a literary language and began publishing in the first Ukrainian literary journals printed in Kharkiv. He corresponded respectfully with Taras Shevchenko, keeping up constantly with literary life. He was a friend of Nikolai Gogol, and it is possible that Gogol's play The Government Inspector was inspired by Kvitka-Osnovianenko's satiric drama The Visitor from the Capitol or Turmoil in a District Town, which has a very similar plot and cast of characters.

In his works Kvitka-Osnovianenko initially followed Ivan Kotliarevsky's travesty tradition. His Ukrainian-language works were mostly burlesque and satirical in nature, but he also wrote more serious prose, such as his sentimentalist novella Marusia, which initiated the genre of Ukrainian classicist prose. According to Kvitka's own statement about the novella, he wrote it "to prove to one unbeliever that something gentle and touching can be written in the Ukrainian language."

He also tried his hand at the gothic genre with his "Dead Man's Easter" (1834).

=== Historical Novels ===
From the historical works of interest are the "Historical and Statistical Outline of Slobozhanshchyna" (1838), "On the Sloboda Regiments", "Ukrainians" (1841) and “History of the Theater in Kharkiv” (1841).

In the 1830s, Kvitka composed a fantastic lyrical story about the founding of the city of Kharkiv in the middle of the 17th century with his ancestor Andriy Kvitka. This story, published in his collected works, is not supported by any source and has never been seriously considered by any historian.

=== The most famous works ===
- Малоросийские анекдоты (Little Russian Anecdotes) - 1821-1822 (in Russian)
- Шельменко-волосний писар (Shelmenko-volost clerk) - comedy, 1831
- Конотопська відьма (The Witch of Konotop) - 1833
- Салдатський патрет (A Soldier's Portrait) - novella, 1833
- Маруся (Marusia) - novella, 1834-1837
- Сердешна Оксана (Poor Oksana) - 1834-1837
- Сватання на Гончарівці (The Courtship at Honcharivka) - comedy, 1836
- Шельменко-денщик (Shelmenko the Batman) - comedy, 1837
- Козир-дівка (The Trump Girl) - 1838
- Пан Халявский (Mr. Khalyavsky) - 1839 (in Russian)
- Ганнуся (Hannusya) - 1839

== Film adaptations ==
Films based on his works:

- The Courtship at Honcharivka (1958)
- Shelmenko the Batman (1910, 1911, 1957)
- Shelmenko the Batman (1971)
- The Witch (1990, 2 a; based on the story "The Witch of Konotop")

=== Documentary films about Hryhorii Kvitka-Osnovianenko ===
- "Hryhorii Kvitka-Osnovianenko" (1979)
- "Kvitka-Osnovianenko" (1988)

== Critical reception ==
Kvitka-Osnovianenko's literary achievement has tended to be a polarizing subject for critics of Ukrainian culture. On the one hand, as one of the first popular writers to use the Ukrainian language, he is viewed a founding figure of Ukrainian literature and the "father of Ukrainian prose". On the other hand, many prominent Ukrainian scholars, including Ivan Franko, Mykola Zerov, and Dmytro Chyzhevsky, viewed his work as reactionary and conservative and were skeptical of the sentimental, pastoral image that he painted of Ukraine and Ukrainians.

== See also ==
- List of Ukrainian-language writers
- List of Ukrainian literature translated into English
