= Oksana Zhdanova =

Ukrainian actress (born 1993)

- Оксана Жданова
- Born: February 3, 1993 (age 33); Kherson, Kherson Oblast, Ukraine
- Education: Kyiv National I. K. Karpenko-Kary Theatre, Cinema and Television University
- Occupation: Actress
- Parents: Viktor Zhdanov (father); Olena Khokhlatkina (mother)

Oksana Victorivna Zhdanova (Ukrainian: Оксана Вікторівна Жданова; born February 3, 1993) is a Ukrainian theater, film and television actress.

== Biography ==
Oksana Victorivna Zhdanova was born on February 3, 1993, in Kherson. Her mother, Olena Khokhlatkina is named People's Artist of Ukraine. Her father, Viktor Zhdanov, is a Merited Artist of Ukraine. Both of her parents act in theater. She has a brother. She had her first acting role at age two as an extra at the Kherson Regional Ukrainian Music and Drama Theater, where both of her parents worked at the time. She wanted to become a ballerina at first. However, she got rejected after applying for a ballet school due to her height and figure. In 2010, she moved to Kyiv to study at the Kyiv National I. K. Karpenko-Kary Theatre, Cinema and Television University. She graduated in 2015. She earned her first television acting role in the series Dvornyazhka Lyalya (Ukrainian: Дворняжка Ляля). She said that the role was very competitive, having a long casting call. She was doubtful about earning the role, having only acted in student films and theater at that point. She said that at the last minute, she had a sudden phone call announcing that she earned the role. She has been part of the Ivan Franko National Academic Drama Theater since 2020.

She speaks Russian, Ukrainian and English.

== Credits ==
=== Theater ===
Year	Title	Role	Venue	Ref(s)
	Sing, Lola, Sing!	Rosa Frelich (Lola), cabaret actress	Ivan Franko National Academic Drama Theater	
	The Resistible Rise of Arturo Ui	Betty Dullfeet	Ivan Franko National Academic Drama Theater	
	The Witch of Konotop	Olena	Ivan Franko National Academic Drama Theater	

=== Film ===
Year	Title	Role	Ref(s)
2022	Bednaya Sasha		

=== Television ===
Year	Title	Role	Ref(s)
	Dvornyazhka Lyalya	Lyalya Rubinova	
