= Kyrylo Tymoshenko =

Ukrainian politician (born 1989)

- Кирило Тимошенко
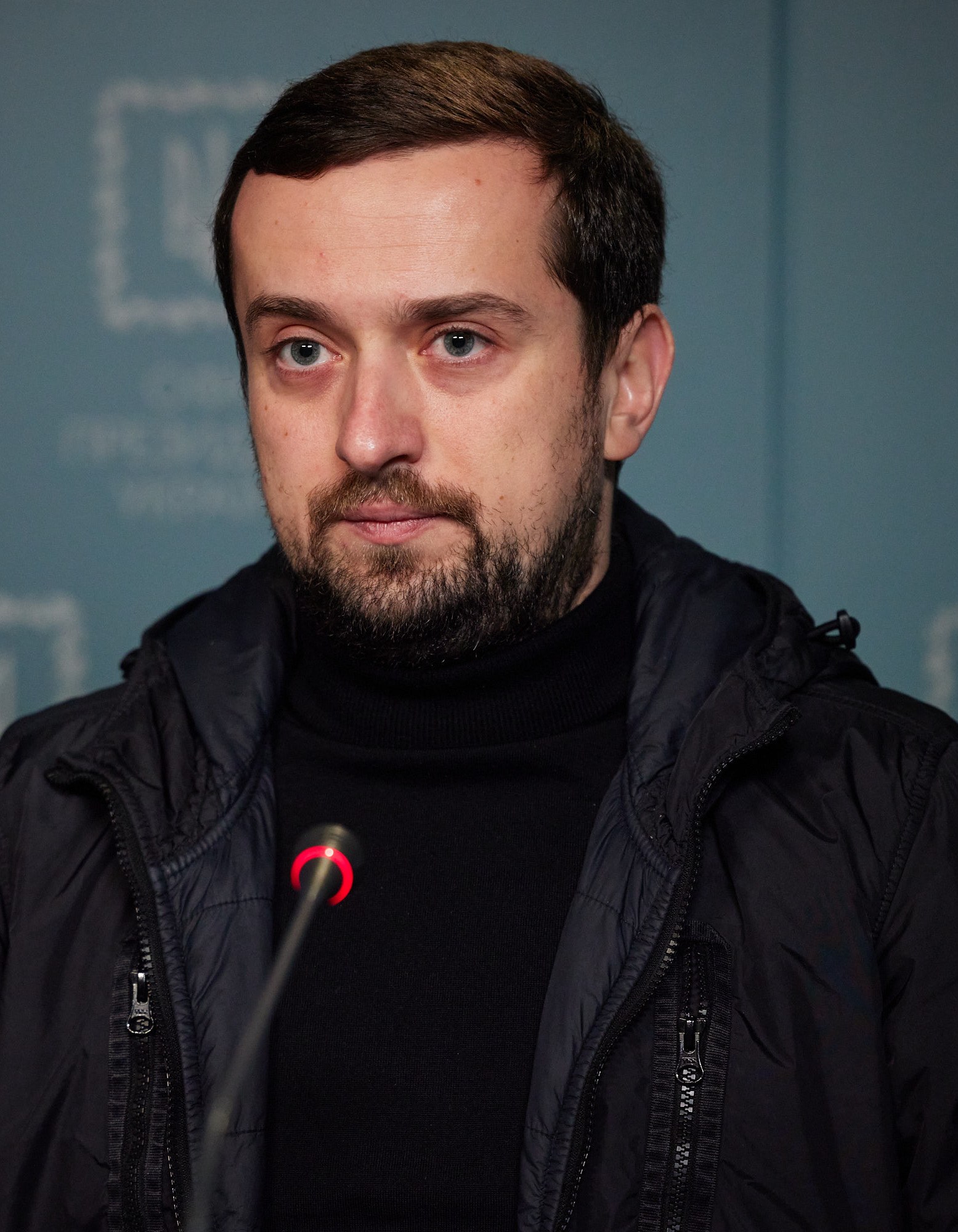

Deputy Head of the Office of the President of Ukraine
- In office May 21, 2019 – January 23, 2023
- Succeeded by: Oleksiy Kuleba

Personal details
- Born: April 20, 1989 (age 37) Dnipropetrovsk, Ukrainian SSR, Soviet Union (now Dnipro, Ukraine)
- Education: Oles Honchar Dnipro National University
- Occupation: politician

Kyrylo Vladlenovych Tymoshenko (Ukrainian: Кири́ло Владле́нович Тимоше́нко; born April 20, 1989) is a Ukrainian politician who served as deputy Head of the Office of the President of Ukraine from May 21, 2019, to January 23, 2023. He was coordinator of Ukraine's Large Construction Infrastructure Development Program. Tymoshenko founded GOODMEDIA agency.

== Biography ==
Tymoshenko was born on April 20, 1989, in Dnipropetrovsk, USSR.

He graduated from Oles Honchar Dnipro National University, majoring in Jurisprudence.

He started his career in 2005 at the age of 17 at Private TV Dnipro television company (9th channel) as a sports journalist. At the same time, he worked as a staff correspondent for "Goal!" on the Novyi Kanal TV channel. In 2007, Novyi Kanal offered Tymoshenko a job in Kyiv, and he moved from Dnipropetrovsk to the capital. There he worked for Inter TV channel, FILM.ua and Ukraine TV channel.

From 2011, he worked as a producer at 07 Production and Mamas Film Production LLC. In 2014, he founded the advertising company GOODMEDIA, which specializes in PR services and election campaigns. Various Ukrainian politicians and organizations became Tymoshenko's customers, in particular, GOODMEDIA worked with Petro Poroshenko, Yuriy Lutsenko, Volodymyr Groysman, and the Ministry of Information Policy of Ukraine. In 2014, the company produced the film Battle of the Dnieper.

Tymoshenko also produced social videos for television about the Ukrainian army, such as "Airport", "You are Near. We believe. We live…". In 2015, a GOODMEDIA video produced by Tymoshenko to support families of killed Ukrainian soldiers received an Omni Award (USA). This was the first time a Ukrainian video had received the award.

=== Political activity ===
During Ukraine's early parliamentary elections in 2014, Kyrylo Tymoshenko's company worked with candidates for people's deputies: Borys Filatov, Vitalii Kuprii, and Andrii Denysenko. All three of them later became members of the UKROP party. In 2015, Tymoshenko was a media person for UKROP, from which he stood for the Kyiv City Council. He was an assistant to the People's Deputy of Ukraine of the 8th convocation Аndrii Denysenko on a voluntary basis.

During the 2019 presidential campaign, he worked at the headquarters of the candidate for President of Ukraine Volodymyr Zelenskyy, being responsible for the media and the creative content of the election campaign. He was the author of the video with Volodymyr Zelenskyy challenging Petro Poroshenko to a debate. Tymoshenko was a member of the organizing committee of Zelensky's inauguration.

On May 21, 2019, after winning the election, Zelenskyy appointed Tymoshenko to the position of Deputy Head of the Presidential Administration. In the summer of 2019, the Presidential Administration was reorganized into the Office of the President. By a decree issued on June 25, 2019, Tymoshenko was appointed Deputy Head of the Office of the President of Ukraine. In the Office of the President, he was initially responsible for information policy, and also oversaw the protocol of the Head of State and the IT sector. Tymoshenko was responsible for regional policy in the Office of the President starting in 2020.

In June 2020, he became the coordinator of the presidential program Large Construction, which foresees the renewal of roads and social infrastructure throughout Ukraine. In March 2021, he was appointed Executive Secretary of the Presidium of the Congress of Local and Regional Authorities established under the President of Ukraine.

Tymoshenko resigned from his position as Deputy Head of the Presidential Administration on January 23, 2023. Neither Tymoshenko nor President Zelenskyy provided a reason for Tymoshenko's resignation. It was speculated that his departure was part of a personnel shake-up previously announced by Zelenskyy.

=== Family ===
Tymoshenko's father is Vladlen Vasyliovych Tymoshenko, the director of the Limited Liability Company Business Center Cominfo LTD. He is a member of the Dnipropetrovsk Regional Council from the Servant of the People party and chairman of the standing committee on activity of municipal companies and entrepreneurship.

Tymoshenko's wife Alyona Tymoshenko is the founder and head of the first Ukrainian Film School (established on the basis of FILM.UA). Together they have one son, named Semen.
