= Pamfir =

- Directed by: Dmytro Sukholytkyy-Sobchuk
- Screenplay by: Dmytro Sukholytkyy-Sobchuk
- Release date: 2022
- Running time: 102 minutes
- Countries: Ukraine; Poland; France; Luxembourg
- Language: Ukrainian

Pamfir (Ukrainian: «Памфір») is a 2022 Ukrainian fictional feature film directed by Dmytro Sukholytkyy-Sobchuk, which world premiered on May 22, 2022, at the 75th Festival de Cannes, in the selection of the 54th Directors' Fortnight. In Ukrainian distribution since March 23, 2023. From June 22 that year, the film was released on Netflix. The film received the main prize of the Cairo International Film Festival, the Grand Prix of the Kyiv International Film Festival Molodist, took part in many international film festivals. Pamfir was named among the best films of 2023 by The Guardian.

Oleksandr Yatsentiuk played the leading role. The film was made before Russian full-scale invasion in Ukraine, and became one of the most important artistic expressions about contemporary Ukraine – its unbreakable spirit and will for life.

== Plot ==
The main character of the film, Pamfir, is a former smuggler, but a good family man who returns to his native village located in the western part of Ukraine, after working abroad for several years. He decides from now on to earn a living by honest work, thus setting a good example for his teenage son Nazar. The main events take place in Bukovina on the eve of the traditional Malanka carnival. But in the region, corruption is an integral part of all spheres of life, and crime and religion are inextricably linked. Organized crime is headed by Orest Ivanovych Mordovskiy, nicknamed Morda (Mug), who is also the head of a local forest protection company. Pamfir's noble plans are not destined to come true due to an incident involving his son: Nazar wants to keep his father at home and sets fire to his documents, and with them, unwittingly, the local house of prayer. Now, in order to make up for the damage, Pamfir is forced to reconnect with his troubled past, return to crime, become a member of a criminal group and engage in smuggling again.

== Cast ==
- Oleksandr Yatsentiuk as Leonid "Pamfir"
- Stanislav Potiak as Nazar, Leonid's son
- Solomiya Kyrylova as Olena, Leonid's wife
- Olena Khokhlatkina as Leonid's mother
- Myroslav Makoviychuk as Leonid's father
- Ivan Sharan as Viktor, Leonid's younger brother
- Oleksandr Yarema as Orest "Morda"
- Andriy Kyrylchuk as Bobul, a policeman
- Ihor Danchuk as Pastor Andriy
- Petro Chychuk as Vasyl, a ranger
- Vitaliy Boyuk as Kolya, a twin
- Oleksandr Boyuk as Tolya, a twin
- Kateryna Tysiak as Anhelina
- Viktor Baranovskiy as Shchur
- Halyna Sviata as border guard
- Heorhiy Povolotskiy as Bison, a border guard
- Oleksiy Leybiuk as Akela
- Volodymyr Lyutikov as border guard
- Vitaliy Koval as Petro, a border guard
- Zinoviy Symchych as priest
- Ihor Demyanyuk
- Rymma Zyubina as TV host

== Creative team ==
The film was co-produced by teams from Ukraine, France, Poland, Luxembourg and Chile. Production was by Bosonfilm together with Les Films D'Ici, Madants, Wady Films, Quijote and in partnership with Mainstream Pictures.

Producers are Oleksandra Kostina, Yevheniya (Jane) Yatsuta, Alona Tymoshenko, Artem Kolyubayev, Laura Briand, Adolf El Assal, Silvana Santamaria, Klaudia Śmieja-Rostworowska, Bogna Szewczyk, and Giancarlo Nasi.

== Production ==
The first treatment of the future film was written in 2016, when the director took part in the Torino Film Lab workshop with a short film. Following that, the director made his short fiction debut with Weightlifter.

From May 2018, producer Oleksandra Kostina joined the project. At first, the work was done jointly, but eventually the functions were divided into creative and production functions. The next step in the script work went during the Cinéfondation Residence of the Cannes Film Festival (France) in 2019. Six writers were provided with opportunities to live and work in Paris and receive various consultations. The project was developed in the script workshops TorinoFilmLab (Script&Pitch) and Midpoint Intensive. The finale was the presentation of projects in the Cinema du monde (CNC) pavilion. The project received attention and found French partners, in particular the company Les Films D'Ici and co-producer Laura Briand.

In 2019, Pamfir became one of the winners of the 11th competitive selection of the Ukrainian State Film Agency and received financial support from the government. The film also received the support of the Polish Film Institute (PISF), the Swiss Visions Sud Est fund, a European fund supporting experimental cinema, the Hubert Bals Fund, the French national film center – CNC Aide aux cínemas du monde, the Goteborg Film Fund and the Governor of Chernivtsi Oblast. The project was developed with the support of the Ukrainian Cultural Foundation.

Filming took place from October 2020 in the conditions of lockdowns in Bukovyna, where the actors had lived for three months before, for deeper immersion in their roles. The actors mastered the local dialect – wrote down the story of their day in the dialect, kept characters' diaries about their preferences, relationships with other characters, etc.

Filming was preceded by expeditions that drew authentic elements to the production. In particular, the labyrinthine method of drying hay, which was found in the village of Sarata, was recreated by the production designers in the house of Pamfir's parents based on photographs.

One scene in the village in which the film takes place was filmed in more than ten different locations.

=== Work with actors ===
The main actors, while preparing for filming, lived directly in the authentic environment, did household chores, grazed cows, etc. The peculiarity was that they had to do everything on behalf of their characters. At the same time, dialect practice was part of the process. And, in addition to theoretical exercises, they also completed the task of going to the market, getting to know each other in a crowded place, etc. This way, actors passed a test on how they got into the roles.

Actor Oleksandr Yacentyuk gained 18 kilograms, and Ivan Sharan lost 10 kilograms for their roles.

Actors mastered new professions. Solomiya Kyrylova, to be more convincing in her role, worked a real factory assembly line for a full week. To get into the role of precinct officer, Andriy Kyrylchuk spent a month at a police station in Ivano-Frankivsk.

In addition to professional actors, the local population was involved in the filming of mass scenes.

== Images in the film ==
=== Pamfir ===
The film's title refers to a nickname given to the main character by his grandfather in their village.

When asked about the existence of a prototype of the main character, the director answers: "Somehow it happens to me when I make a movie that it is always a collective image. If we talk about him, there are some traits that the protagonist himself, the performer of the main role, Oleksandr Yatsentyuk, brought, while taking on others from different people. Therefore, to say that there was a specific man who became a prototype – I would not say so unequivocally. It is a collective substance".

=== Malanka ===
The image of Malanka in Pamfir is defined by the director as "the bright diamond in the palette". This is Dmytro Sukholytkyy-Sobchuk's new foray in to the carnival event – previously he depicted it in the 2013 documentary Krasna Malanka where he explored the festivity's unity with people and nature.

The version of Malanka recreated in Pamfir is a compilation of the carnival in three different localities: Beleluya, Vashkivtsi, Krasnoilsk. Some elements were contributed by folk artists and decorators, including Volodymyr Chorniy.

Oleksandr Yatsentyuk's first encounter with Malanka started a year before the filming, with him being introduced to the carnival in Chernivtsi, at the Malanka Festival.

== Festival life ==
Pamfir was among the 23 fiction films from around the world to be selected to the program of the 54th Directors' Fortnight, a parallel program of the 75th Festival de Cannes. The film was demonstrated alongside the works by other 2022 program participants: Alex Garland, Pietro Marcello, Mia Hansen-Løve, Nicolas Parisier, Alice Winocour and others. The screening in Cannes on May 22, 2022 became the world premiere of Pamfir. Attending the premiere were president of the European Film Academy Agnieszka Holland, Head of the Ukrainian State Film Agency Maryna Kuderchuk, directors Agnieszka Smoczynska, Philippe Lacôte and others. Media reported a six minute ovation following the screening.

According to the director, the question of showing the film at the festival where Russians also took part (this was a discussion in the team of director Maksym Nakonechniy whose film also participated in one of the festival sections), was not an issue at all. He explains his motivation: "If we just turn around and leave all the events where Russians are invited, it will just mean us taking away the possibility of sounding our own voices, our opinions. To me it's more about depriving ourselves of the opportunity to talk to the world about the war. In Cannes, not just one program selected us, we had several offers – and it became clear that if we go, no one would ask us about film, they'd ask us about us. And our voice would be the weapon that needs to be used, to talk about what is going on in our country".

== Distribution ==
The film was released in Ukrainian cinemas on March 23, 2023.

Over six weekends in Ukrainian release, Pamfir got 76,414 viewers, and grossed over 11 million UAH at the box office. Kyiv was the leader in attendance, with nearly 53% of the total box office (the highest number of viewers watched the film in the Zhovten cinema – 10,117 viewers at 80 screenings). Lviv was in second place (20,62%), followed by Ivano-Frankivsk, Odesa, and Dnipro.

In June 2023, UK's The Guardian included Pamfir among the 37 top films of 2023. Among them were also Tár with Cate Blanchett, The Fabelmans by Steven Spielberg, The Son by Florian Zeller, documentary films about musician Little Richard and migrants at the Irish town of Gort. Commenting on the rating, director Sukholytkyy-Sobchuk said:

It’s a collection where the Ukrainian film took its spot. And I am very happy about the fact that Pamfir received such recognition, where artistic qualities are prioritised, where a Ukrainian auteur voice sounds in the global context. And in this expression, some start to look for explanations why Ukrainians are so powerful, so dedicated. Among these built-in contexts, hidden codes, they find answers and reasons for love and self-sacrifice. Through Pamfir, they meet us as a nation, not just through the war. Thanks to the film, the audience often receives answers about how freedom-loving our nation is, how courageous, and standing strong in the face of the powerful enemy who outnumbers us, but we still stand as one, a united nation. To me this is an important sign that auteur voices about us receive deserving attention.

After the Ukrainian release, from June 22, 2023 the film came out on the Netflix streaming platform, available with subtitles in English.

In June 2023, for the Kupala Night, The National Museum of Folk Architecture and Ethnography launched an exhibition titled Visiting Pamfir, which included costumes, props, masks, sketches and storyboards from the film. Visitors could also see the photos and videos from the production, about the folk tradition of the Malanka carnival, and about the peculiar artistic world of the film. As part of the exhibition, an open air screening of the film was organised.

== Awards and nominations ==
List of awards and nominations
Year	Country	Award	Category	Nominee(s)	Result	Ref.
2022	France	Cannes Film Festival – Directors' Fortnight	Caméra d'Or	Dmytro Sukholytkyy-Sobchuk	Nominated	
2022	Ukraine	Molodist Kyiv International Film Festival	Grand Prix	Dmytro Sukholytkyy-Sobchuk	Won	
2022	Ukraine	Molodist Kyiv International Film Festival	Special Jury Diploma in the National Competition: Full-Length Films	Dmytro Sukholytkyy-Sobchuk	Won	
2022	Ukraine	Ukrainian Film Critics Award – Kinokolo	Best Feature Film	Dmytro Sukholytkyy-Sobchuk, Oleksandra Kostina, Jane Yatsuta, Artem Kolyubayev, Alyona Tymoshenko, Laura Briand, Bogna Szewczyk, Klaudia Śmieja-Rostworowska, Giancarlo Nasi, Adolf El Assal, Silvana Santamaria	Won	
2022	Ukraine	Ukrainian Film Critics Award – Kinokolo	Best Director	Dmytro Sukholytkyy-Sobchuk	Won	
2022	Ukraine	Ukrainian Film Critics Award – Kinokolo	Discovery of the Year	Dmytro Sukholytkyy-Sobchuk	Won	
2022	Ukraine	Ukrainian Film Critics Award – Kinokolo	Best Screenplay	Dmytro Sukholytkyy-Sobchuk	Won	
2022	Ukraine	Ukrainian Film Critics Award – Kinokolo	Best Actor	Oleksandr Yatsentiuk	Won	
2022	Ukraine	Ukrainian Film Critics Award – Kinokolo	Best Actress	Solomiia Kyrylova	Nominated	
2022	Egypt	Cairo International Film Festival	Best Film	Dmytro Sukholytkyy-Sobchuk	Won	
2022	United States	Philadelphia Film Festival	Honorary mention for best cinematography	Mykyta Kuzmenko	Won	
2022	United Kingdom	Raindance Film Festival	Best Cinematogra phy	Mykyta Kuzmenko	Won	
2022	Italy	Torino Film Festival	Achille Valdata Audience Award	Dmytro Sukholytkyy-Sobchuk	Won	
2022	Serbia	Dunav film fest	Best Screenplay	Dmytro Sukholytkyy-Sobchuk	Won	
2022	Serbia	Palić European Film Festival	FIPRESCI prize	Dmytro Sukholytkyy-Sobchuk	Won	
2022	Serbia	Palić European Film Festival	Palic Tower award to best director	Dmytro Sukholytkyy-Sobchuk	Won	
2022	Chile	Santiago Festival Internacional de Cine	Best Foreign Actor	Oleksandr Yatsentiuk	Won	
2022	Austria	Viennale	Der Standard readers jury prize	Dmytro Sukholytkyy-Sobchuk	Won	
2023	United States	Cleveland International Film Festival	The Greg Gund Memorial Standing Up Film Competition	Dmytro Sukholytkyy-Sobchuk	Won	
2023	Ukraine	Ukrainian Film Academy Awards – Golden Dzyga	Best Film	dir. Dmytro Sukholytky y-Sobchuk prod. Oleksandra Kostina; Yevhenia Yatsuta; Artem Kolyubayev; Alyona Tymoshenko	Won	
2023	Ukraine	Ukrainian Film Academy Awards – Golden Dzyga	Best Directing (Yurii Illenko Award)	Dmytro Sukholytkyy-Sobchuk	Won	
2023	Ukraine	Ukrainian Film Academy Awards – Golden Dzyga	Best Actor	Oleksandr Yatsentiuk	Won	
2023	Ukraine	Ukrainian Film Academy Awards – Golden Dzyga	Best Actress	Solomiya Kyrylova	Nominated	
2023	Ukraine	Ukrainian Film Academy Awards – Golden Dzyga	Best Actor in a Supporting Role	Ivan Sharan	Nominated	
2023	Ukraine	Ukrainian Film Academy Awards – Golden Dzyga	Best Actor in a Supporting Role	Oleksandr Yarema	Nominated	
2023	Ukraine	Ukrainian Film Academy Awards – Golden Dzyga	Best Actress in a Supporting Role	Olena Khokhlatkina	Won	
2023	Ukraine	Ukrainian Film Academy Awards – Golden Dzyga	Best Cinematography	Mykyta Kuzmenko	Won	
2023	Ukraine	Ukrainian Film Academy Awards – Golden Dzyga	Best Production Design	Ivan Mykhailov	Won	
2023	Ukraine	Ukrainian Film Academy Awards – Golden Dzyga	Best Screenplay	Dmytro Sukholytkyy-Sobchuk	Won	
2023	Ukraine	Ukrainian Film Academy Awards – Golden Dzyga	Best Costume Design	Mariya Kvitka	Won	
2023	Ukraine	Ukrainian Film Academy Awards – Golden Dzyga	Best Make-up	Maria Pilunska	Won	
2023	Ukraine	Ukrainian Film Academy Awards – Golden Dzyga	Best Sound	Serhiy Stepanskiy	Nominated	
2023	Ukraine	Ukrainian Film Academy Awards – Golden Dzyga	Best Special Effects	Denys Reva	Won	
2023	Ukraine	Ukrainian Film Academy Awards – Golden Dzyga	Discovery award	Dmytro Sukholytkyy-Sobchuk	Won	
