= Gorky Resort =

2026 historical thriller film directed by Łukasz Palkowski

Pojedynek
- Polish: Pojedynek
- Directed by: Łukasz Palkowski
- Screenplay by: Dżamila Ankiewicz; Agatha Dominik; Robert Gliński
- Cinematography: Piotr Sobociński Jr.
- Edited by: Nikodem Chabior
- Music by: Bartosz Chajdecki
- Distributed by: Monolith Films
- Release date: 27 February 2026 (Poland)
- Running time: 113 minutes
- Countries: Poland; Ireland; Ukraine; Cyprus
- Languages: Polish; English; Russian; French

Gorky Resort (Pojedynek) is a 2026 historical thriller film directed by Łukasz Palkowski and written by Dżamila Ankiewicz, Agatha Dominik and Robert Gliński. A co-production between Poland, Ireland, Ukraine and Cyprus. It premiered in Polish theaters on 27 February 2026.

The screenplay for the film grew out of an earlier text under the working title Sanatorium Gorkiego by Dżamila Ankiewicz and Robert Gliński, based on their short stories; the printing of excerpts was to appear in the monthly magazine Dialog (issue 12/2002).

== Filming and locations ==
According to a report by Polskie Radio Rzeszów, part of the filming was carried out in the church in Stare Oleszyce, used on set, among other things, as the interior of the “monastery” (detention centre) from the film (the NKDWD camp in Kozelsk in Optina Monastery). Information about filming scenes at this location was also provided by announcements of the regional premiere in Rzeszów.

A song composed especially for the production, performed by Mrozu and Julia Pietrucha.

== Plot ==
The plot is related to events after the Soviet invasion of Poland in September 1939 and to the film's depicted attempt to “break” Polish elites through isolation and indoctrination in a centre set up in a former monastery. The film's action begins in 1939; thousands of Poles, isolated in a former monastery, are subjected to brutal indoctrination. The plot focuses on a psychological game between a young Polish pianist, a laureate of the Chopin Competition, and a Russian agent who tries to break the protagonist's resistance, counting on influence over fellow prisoners. The film is associated with the thread of mass arrests of the Polish elite by the USSR in 1939 and the pianist's clash with an NKVD agent.

The axis of the plot is a psychological game conducted by an NKVD agent against a selected prisoner (the pianist), whose goal is to force a capitulation that could influence the attitudes of fellow prisoners.

== Cast ==
Source: FilmPolski

- Jakub Gierszał as Karol Grabowski
- Aidan Gillen as Major Vasily Zarubin
- Bogusław Linda as Dr Piotr Nowak
- Julia Pietrucha as Janina Lewandowska
- Wojciech Mecwaldowski as Leon Sztein
- Mateusz Kościukiewicz as Stefan Artymowski
- Antoni Pawlicki as Antoni Tucholski
- Tomasz Kot as Lavrentiy Beria
- Anna Próchniak as Anna Grabowska
- Paul Freeman as coachman
- Magdalena Koleśnik as activist Wanda
- Daria Polunina as Tania
- Grzegorz Palkowski as pilot Maciej Gąsienica
- Krystian Pesta as Andrzej “Zyga” Grabowski
- Grisza Gorobuczuk as Sasha Zarubin
- Viktor Zhdanov as Tseytlin

== See also ==
- Soviet invasion of Poland
- NKVD
- World War II
