= The Witch of Konotop =

1833 Ukrainian story by Hryhorii Kvitka-Osnovianenko

The Witch of Konotop (Ukrainian: Конотопська відьма) is a satirical fiction story by Ukrainian writer Hryhorii Kvitka-Osnovianenko written in 1833 and published in 1837 in his second book of Little Russian Stories.

The story tells of Cossack centurion of the Konotop hundred Mykyta Ulasovich Zabryokha, his clerk Pistryak, and the witch Yavdokha Zubikha. The work consists of 14 chapters and an epilogue; each section begins with the words "sad and gloomy".

== Plot ==
The work begins with a description of Konotop centurion Mykyta Ulasovych Zabryokha sitting "sad and gloomy". The previous day, he had gone to woo Olena, a hard-working and beautiful girl who had no parents, but only a brother; Zabryokha asked the brother if he would give his sister in marriage, but the brother rejected the proposal.

While the centurion sits at home, the clerk Pistryak comes to him with a stick marked with notches indicating the number of Cossacks in the hundred; however, having broken the stick while bringing it into the house, he initially miscounts the number of Cossacks. When Zabryokha discovers the error, he ridicules Pistryak in front of the hundred, offending him. Shortly thereafter, an order arrives from the Chernihiv Regiment to go on a campaign, but the scribe refuses to carry out the order, and writes a letter informing the regiment that the Cossacks cannot come to Konotop, as they must undertake a witch hunt because there has been no rain in Konotop for a long time.

The next day, the whole city gathers near the pond. The scribe has kidnapped several women suspected of being witches, and prescribes a test: each woman is thrown into the water, and if she drowns, she is not a witch, and if she survives, she is a witch. Many women die in the water. The witch turns out to be Yavdokha Zubikha, who floats calmly on the water. Enraged men begin to beat her, but Yavdokha uses her magic to escape.

Later, Zabryokha and Pistryak (separately) come to Zubikha with gifts and ask for help. She initially casts a spell so that Olena falls in love with Zabryokha and wants to marry him. Judge Demyan Khalyavsky, Olena's former lover, now sits sad and unhappy because she is now marrying someone else, but Zubikha offers to help him, too. To get her revenge on her assailants, the witch arranges things so Olena marries Khalyavsky after all, and Zabryokha marries the ugliest girl in the village, Solokha. Shortly thereafter, Zabryokha is removed from his position for not complying with the Chernihiv regiment's orders, as is Pistryak, and Khalyavsky becomes the new captain.

In the epilogue, the author writes that this tale was told to him by the late Panas Mesiura, and reveals the ending to the story: Khalyavsky was not a centurion for long, because he quickly upset his superiors, and his marriage to Olena was unhappy because it was the result of witchcraft. Zabryokha and Pistryak were punished for drowning innocent women, and the witch died a short time later.

== Reception ==
Historically, Hryhorii Kvitka-Osnovianenko 1833 novella has been hailed as a cornerstone of Ukrainian "sentimentalism" and "social satire". Critics have praised its unique "skaz" technique, a narrative style where a folksy, often unreliable narrator uses irony to expose the corruption and incompetence of the Cossack elite. Literary scholars, note that while the work is a "gem of Ukrainian literature", its international recognition was long hindered by the difficulty of translating its linguistic complexity. The text oscillates between Old Church Slavonic, a stylistic range that critics argue was a revolutionary act of cultural preservation during the Russian Empire's linguistic restrictions.

Hryhoriy Hrabovych described The Witch of Konotop as "perhaps the best work of Ukrainian prose of the early 19th century".

== Analysis ==
Osnovianenko's story is interpreted by Tamara Hundorova as a reflection on the fate of provincial Ukrainian Cossacks in Little Russia as part of the Russian Empire. The author depicts Ukraine's situation on the eve of the liquidation of Cossack Hetmanate by Catherine II, showing the gradual assimilation of Cossack starshyna and Russification of local administration. The comical image of Zabriokha parodies the folklore persona of Cossack Mamay, creating a contrast with heroics of the past era. The unsuccessful family life and career of Zabriokha's son and heir, as well as the fact that the story's heroes fail in their mission to defeat the local witch and get disarmed by her, contribute to this humiliating depiction of the contemporary state of Cossacks as a demoralized and emasculated group. In this context the figure of the girl enchanted by the witch, deprived of her force and subjected to the will of others, can be seen as an allegory of Ukraine's status as a colonized province of the empire.

The geography of Yavdokha's travels in Osnovianenko's story corresponds to the area of Ukrainian settlement in the Russian Empire, but the heroine also mentions Carpathian Ruthenians as "Ukrainians' sworn brothers" and reflects over the decline of Zaporozhian Cossacks' original Ukrainian identity among the population of Poltava and Chernihiv governorates. The text includes mentions of Cossack migrations to Kuban, Buh and the Urals. The powerful witch acts as an enemy of Cossacks, replacing their authority in the Hetmanate and turning into a symbol of the establishment of imperial rule over Ukraine. Unlike Nikolai Gogol, whose witch from Christmas Eve serves as an erotic figure and remains unpunished, Osnovianenko presents Yavdokha as an exclusively negative and immoral heroine, and not only her, but also everyone who attempted to benefit from her magic receive punishment in the story's final.

== Adaptations and legacy ==
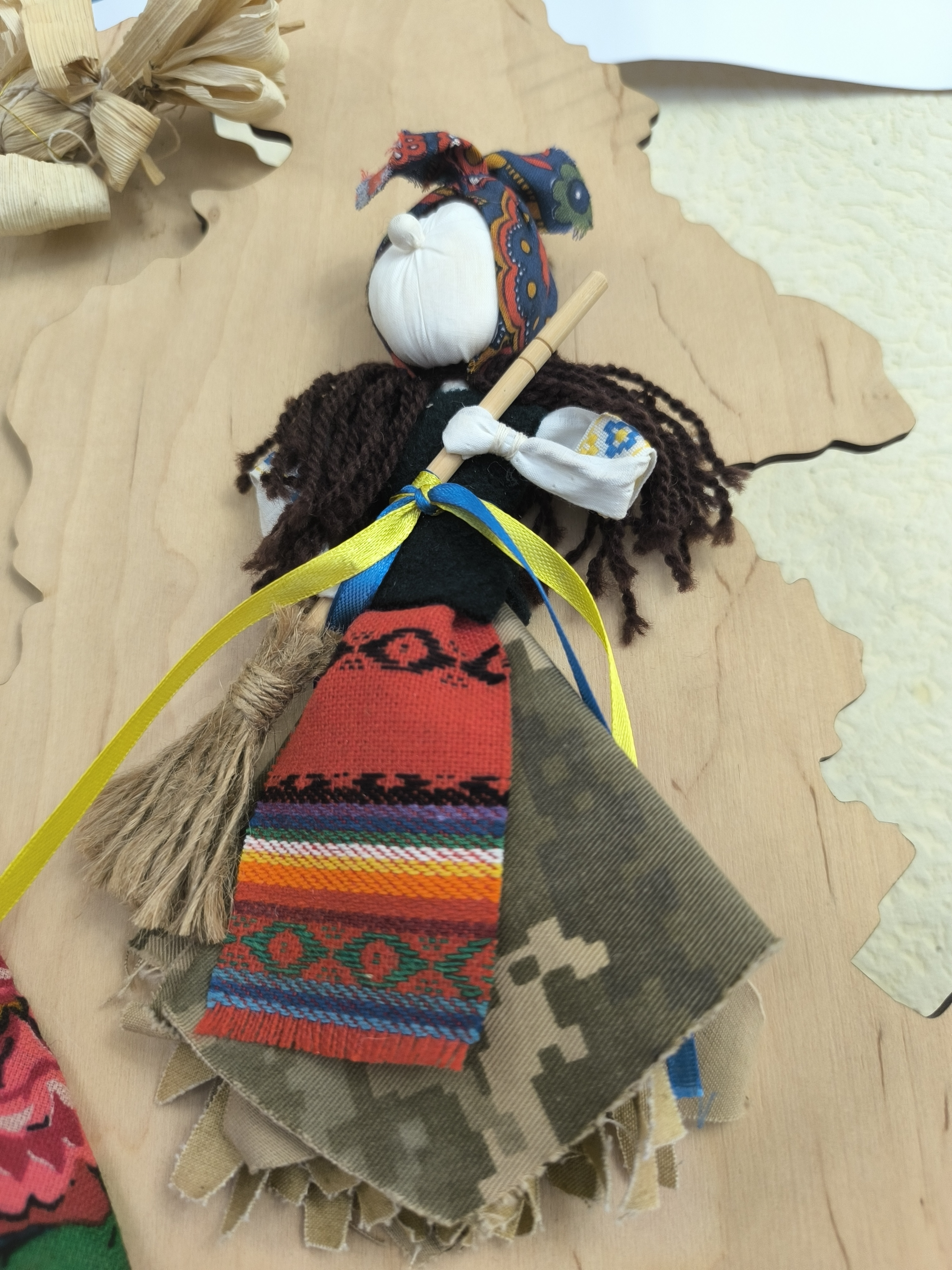
A modern rag doll (motanka) inspired by the story

The work was made into a film by the studio Ukrtelefilm in 1987, and again in 1990 by director Galina Shigaeva for the Alexander Dovzhenko film studio.

It was also adapted as a screenplay by Bogdan Zholdak and performed by the Ivan Franko National Academic Drama Theater in 1982, and performed as a burlesque rap in 2016.

The politician Nataliya Vitrenko was nicknamed "the Witch of Konotop" in reference to the story.

During the 2022 Russian invasion of Ukraine and occupation of Konotop, video went viral of a woman cursing a Russian soldier on a tank, "Don't you know where you are? You're in Konotop. Every other woman here is a witch. You'll never get an erection, starting tomorrow."

In 2024 an eponymous mystical horror film by Ukrainian director Andriy Kolesnyk reinterpreted the original story in context of the current Russo-Ukrainian War.

== Link ==
- Text of the story on the website ukrlit.org
