= Tetiana Malkova =

Ukrainian actress

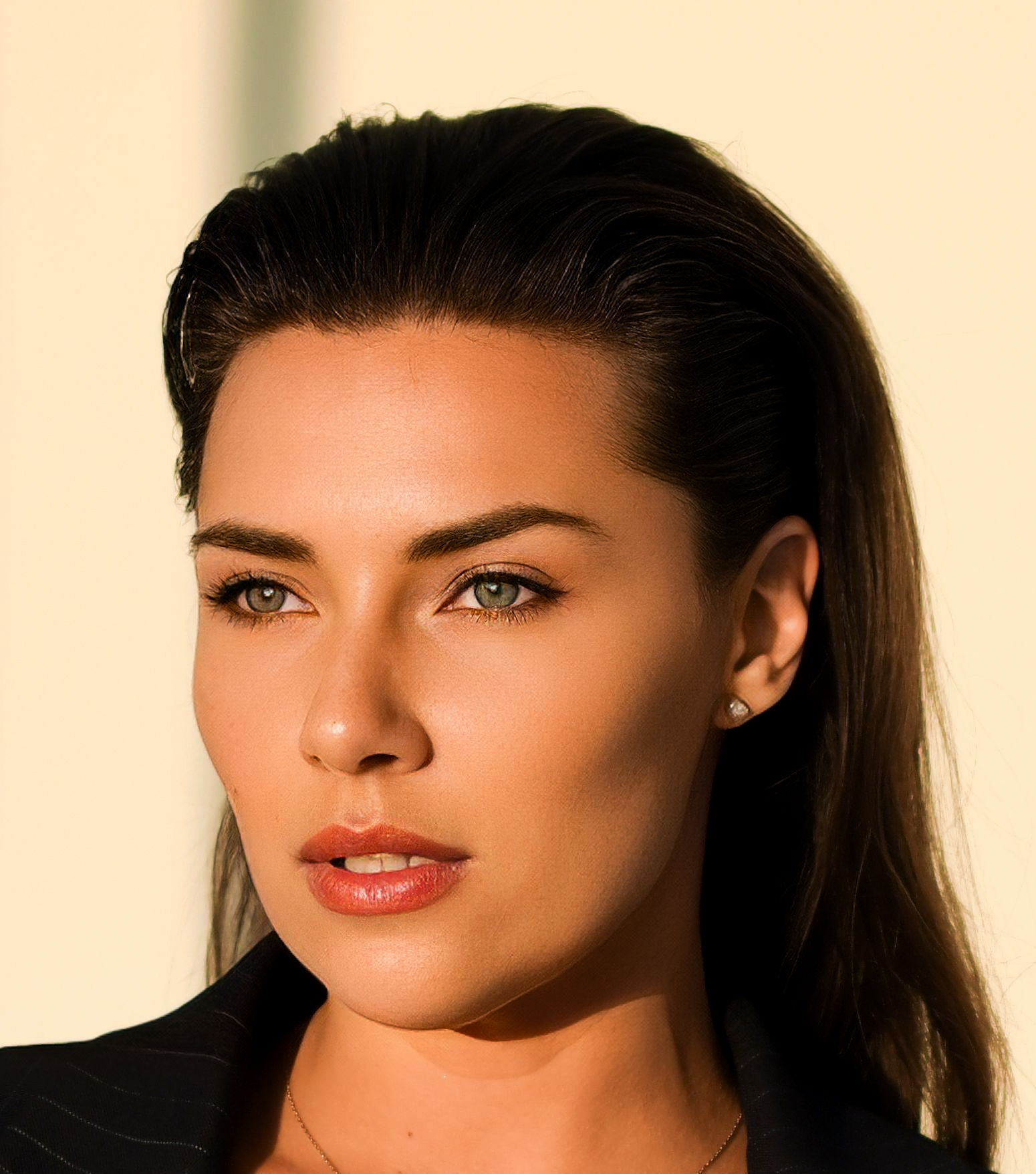
- Photo of Tetiana Malkova
- Born: Tetiana Olehivna Ozhelevska; 16 September 1988 (age 37); Kyiv, Ukrainian SSR, Soviet Union
- Citizenship: Ukraine
- Occupations: Actress; television presenter
- Spouse: Dmytro Malkov

Tetiana Olehivna Malkova (Note: Ukrainian: Тетяна Олегівна Малкова) (née Ozhelevska; born 16 September 1988) is a Ukrainian actress and television presenter.

== Biography ==
Malkova was born on 16 September 1988 in Kyiv. As a child, her parents sent her to a dance club. Malkova devoted 10 years to choreography and she worked as an aerial gymnast in a circus studio for a year. At the age of 17, she began to actively engage as a singer. Malkova graduated from National Pedagogical Drahomanov University and Kyiv National Economic University.

Malkova is a soloist of the group "Deva Jazz". She was also a finalist in the third season of The Voice of Ukraine. From 2011 to 2013, she was the host of programs on the "Pershiy Avtomobilny" channel where she also served as executive producer. In 2013, she was the host of the "Pydyom" program on the "Novyi Kanal" channel. From 2014 to 2016, she hosted the "Jedi" program on the "2+2" channel. From 2015 to 2017, she was an actress of the show "Made in Ukraine" of Kvartal 95 Studio.

== Personal life ==
Malkova is married to director Dmytro Malkov and has two children.
