= Dmytro Sukholytkyy-Sobchuk =

Ukrainian author, film director and writer

- Born: Dmytro Sukholytkyy-Sobchuk; March 23, 1983 (age 43); Uman, Ukrainian SSR, Soviet Union
- Education: Chernivtsi University
- Occupations: Film director; film producer; screenwriter
- Years active: 2008–present

Dmytro Sukholytkyy-Sobchuk (Ukrainian: Дмитро Михайлович Сухолиткий-Собчук; born March 23, 1983) is a Ukrainian author, film director and writer.

Sukholytkyy-Sobchuk's feature-length debut film was Pamfir (2022), which had its world premiere at the Cannes film festival. The film was nominated for the Discovery of the Year Prize of the EFA and received over 30 awards, screening at more than 70 film festivals. His short films were selected for such prestigious film festivals as Sundance Film Festival, DOC NYC, IDFA, Toronto International Film Festival, Clermont-Ferrand International Short Film Festival, Palm Springs International Festival of Short Films and others.

He is a member of the Ukrainian (from 2017) and European (from 2018) film academies, founder and organiser of the Terrarium script development platform.

== Early life ==
Dmytro Sukholytkyy-Sobchuk was born on March 23, 1983, in Uman, Ukrainian SSR, Soviet Union. His family originates from the Ivano-Frankivsk region. He graduated from the Chernivtsi Polytechnical college with a degree in architecture. He also received a bachelor's degree at the philosophy and theological faculty of the National University of Chernivtsi and studied at a journalism school. He later worked as a cameraman and editor for several local and national TV channels, as well as a poster artist for a cinema in Chernivtsi.

In 2013, Sukholytkyy-Sobchuk graduated from the Kyiv National I. K. Karpenko-Kary Theatre, Cinema and Television University as a film director (Mykhailo Illienko workshop). He took part in a number of national and international film festivals with his student short films. He won a screenplay competition in 2011, was a participant of the Berlinale Talent Campus (2013) and received a Gaude Polonia scholarship (2015, 2017).

== Career ==
=== Student works ===
During his studies, Sukholytkyy-Sobchuk directed several fiction short films. Adolescence (Ukrainian: «Отроцтво»), his first-year project, received attention at film festivals and garnered awards. Roots. DREAMS. (Ukrainian: «Коріння. СНИ.») is based on Hryhir Tyutyunnyk's short story "Wild." The Beard (Ukrainian: «Борода»), his bachelor's graduation film, was included in the omnibus Ukraine, Goodbye! alongside works by Myroslav Slaboshpytskyi and Volodymyr Tykhyi. Krasna Malanka (Ukrainian: «Красна Маланка»), a medium-length documentary, depicts the Malanka carnival celebrated by ethnic Romanians in Krasna, influencing his later feature debut Pamfir.

=== Weightlifter ===
The film Weightlifter won the Grand Prix at the Warsaw International Film Festival in 2020 and received an Oscar qualification. It was also nominated for the best short film award of the European Film Academy at the Drama International Short Film Festival in Greece.

=== Pamfir ===
Pamfir marked Sukholytkyy-Sobchuk's feature-length fiction debut. It premiered at the 2022 Cannes Film Festival in the Directors' Fortnight section.

=== Liturgy of Anti-Tank Obstacles ===
After his feature debut, Sukholytkyy-Sobchuk directed a short documentary focusing on Ukrainians who temporarily changed professions to support the country's war efforts against Russia. Funded by The New Yorker, the film documents the personal and collective impact of the conflict. The film had its world premiere on August 13, 2022, at the Sarajevo Film Festival, opening the festival's documentary program. It was subsequently selected for over 70 international film festivals, including IDFA, Toronto International Film Festival, Sundance Film Festival, DOC NYC, and Clermont-Ferrand ISFF.

== Civic position ==
In 2018, he supported the appeal of the European Film Academy in defence of Ukrainian filmmaker Oleh Sentsov, who was imprisoned in Russia.

He made a number of statements to draw attention to the fate of Maksym Butkevych, an activist, soldier, and eventually a prisoner in the so-called LPR. In particular, the flag with his portrait on it accompanied the director during the European Film Awards ceremony.

== Filmography ==
Year	Country	Title	Type	Length, min	Role			Notes
Year	Country	Title	Type	Length, min	Director	Writer	Producer	Notes
2008	Ukraine	«Отроцтво» «Adolescence»	Fiction	10	Yes	Yes	Yes	
2009	Ukraine	«Коріння. СНИ.» «Roots. DREAMS.»	Fiction	15	Yes	Yes	Yes	
2011	Ukraine	«Нитка» «Thread»	Fiction	10	Yes	Yes	No	
2012	Ukraine	«Борода» «The Beard» part of «Ukraine, Goodbye!»	Fiction	25	Yes	Yes	Yes	
2013	Ukraine	«Красна Маланка» «Krasna Malanka»	Documentary	53	Yes	Yes	Yes	
2015	Romania; Ukraine	«Intersection» «Інтерсекція»	Documentary	20	Yes	Yes	No	
2018	Ukraine	«Штангіст» «Weightlifter»	Fiction short	30	Yes	Yes	No	
2022	Ukraine; Poland; France; Chile	«Памфір» «Pamfir»	Fiction full-length	102	Yes	Yes	No	
2022	United States; Ukraine	«Літургія протитанкових перешкод» «Liturgy of Anti-Tank Obstacles»	Documentary experimental	12	Yes	Yes	Yes	

== Festivals and awards ==
Given by the Terrarium portal

Adolescence

- 2008 – Best Short Film Award, 3-d International Film Festival «KinoLev» (Lviv, Ukraine)
- 2008 – Grand Prix, 12-th Ukrainian Film Festival «Vidkryta Nich» (Kyiv, Ukraine)
- 2008 – Best Director, 12-th Ukrainian Film Festival «Vidkryta Nich» (Kyiv, Ukraine)
- 2008 – Best film. International prize of the name of Arseniy and Andrey Tarkovsky
- 2008 – Official selection. 38-th International Film Festival «Molodist» (Kyiv, Ukraine)
- 2008 – Official selection. 7-th Open Saint-Petersburg Student Film Festival «Beginning» (Russia)
- 2008 – Official selection. 4-th International Film Festival (Sevastopol, Ukraine)
- 2009 – Tomorrow's Cinema Award, 35-th Festival International Film Independent, Brussels, Belgium
- 2009 – Official selection. 11-th Jakarta International Film Festival (Jakarta, Indonesia)
- 2009 – Official selection. 7-th Asiana International Short Film Festival (Seoul, South Korea)
- 2009 – Official selection. 32-th Istanbul International Film Festival (Istanbul, Turkey)
- 2009 – Official selection. 11-th Motovun Film Festival (Motovun, Croatia)
- 2009 – Official selection. 10-th International Short Film Festival «Maremetraggio» (Trieste, Italy)
- 2009 – Official selection. 7-th International Almaty Film Festival «Shaken's Stars» (Almaty, Kazakhstan)
- 2009 – Official selection. 9-th Festival of Central and Eastern European Film «GoEast» (Wiesbaden, Germany)
- 2009 – Official selection. 2-d International Student Film Festival «Early Melons» (Bratislava, Slovakia)
- 2010 – Official selection. 18-th Festival CinéRail International Festival Trains on Film (Paris, France)
- 2010 – Official selection. 7-th Novara International Cine Festival (Novara, Italy)
- 2010 – Official selection. 4-th Kinofest International Digital film Festival (Buharest, Romania)

The Beard

- 2011 – Найкращий кіносценарій конкурсу «Коронація слова 2011»
- 2012 – Main award in script section of «Coronation of the word» (Kiev, Ukraine)
- 2012 – Best screenplay, Ukrainian Film Festival «Vidkryta Nich» (Kiev, Ukraine)
- 2012 – Official selection. 4-th Leiden International short Film Experience (Netherlands)
- 2012 – Official selection. 42-th International Film Festival «Molodist» (Kyiv, Ukraine)
- 2013 – Official selection. PRIFILMFEST International Film Festival (Prishtina, Republic of Kosova)
- 2013 – Official selection. Tbilisi International Student Film Festival «AMIRANI» (Tbilisi, Georgia)
- 2013 – Official selection. Ljubljana International Short Film Festival (Ljubljana, Slovenia)

Krasna Malanka

- 2013 – Official selection. Astra Film Festival (Sibiu, Romania)
- 2013 – Official selection. 43-th International Film Festival «Molodist» (Kyiv, Ukraine)
- 2013 – Official selection. Tranzyt International Documentary Film Festival (Poznań, Poland)
- 2014 – Official selection. 11th World Film Festival (Tartu, Estonia)
- 2014 – Official selection. Rural Route Film Festival (New York, US)
- 2015 – 1-st prize cadRO, CRONOGRAF – International Documentary Film Festival (Chisinau, Moldova)

Intersection

- 2015 – Nomination. GOPO Romanian film industry Awards, Documentary Short Film (Bucharest, Romania)
- 2015 – Official selection. Krakow Film Festival (Poland)
- 2015 – Official selection. International Bosphorus Film Festival (Istanbul, Turkey)
- 2015 – Official selection. Montenegro Film Festival (Herceg Novi)
- 2016 – Best Documentary Film, ISFFestival NEW WAWE (Sophia, Bulgaria)
- 2016 – Special Mentions in the CadRO Section, CRONOGRAF – IDFF (Chisinau, Moldova)
- 2016 – Official selection. ZagrebDox Festival (Zagreb, Croatia)
- 2016 – Official selection. IHRDFF Docudays UA, National competition (Kiev, Ukraine)

Weightlifter

- 2018 – GRAND PRIX. International Short competition. Warsaw Film Festival (Warsaw, Poland)
- 2018 – GRAND PRIX, International Short competition. Premiers Plans – Angers Film Festival (France)
- 2018 – GRAND PRIX, ZubrOFFka – International Short Film Festival (Bialystok, Poland)
- 2018 – GRAND PRIX, National Short competition, International Film Festival «Molodist» (Kyiv, Ukraine)
- 2018 – I PRIZE in International Competition EASTWARD WINDOW, ZubrOFFka – ISFF (Bialystok, Poland)
- 2018 – BEST CINEMATOGRAPHY, ZubrOFFka – ISFF (Bialystok, Poland)
- 2018 – NEW EUROPE TALENT AWARD, ZubrOFFka – ISFF (Bialystok, Poland)
- 2018 – BEST SHORT FILM, Ukrainian Critic Choice Award «Kinokolo» (Kyiv, Ukraine)
- 2018 – SPECIAL MENTION. National competition 11th Lviv International Short Film Festival Wiz-Art
- 2018 – Official selection. National competition, Odesa International Film Festival (Odesa, Ukraine)
- 2019 – CANDIDATE for a NOMINATION in the category «EUROPEAN SHORT FILM» at the 32nd European Film Awards. International Short Film Festival in Drama (Greece)
- 2019 – II PRIZE Short Films. Rivne International Film Festival «Dream City» (Rivne, Ukraine)
- 2019 – ANGEL MAJOR AWARD. Certamen Internacional de Cortos Ciudad de Soria (Spain)
- 2019 – BEST SHORT FILM, Association of Film Critics (National Union of Filmmakers of Ukraine) (Ukraine)
- 2019 – BEST SHORT FICTION FILM. Sound & Image Challenge International Festival (Macau, China)
- 2019 – BEST FILM. International Screen Awards (Jakarta, Indonesia)
- 2019 – BEST DIRECTOR Award. Kamianets-Podilskyi International Film Festival «BRUKIVKA» (Ukraine)
- 2019 – BEST INTERNATIONAL SHORT Audience Award. Cecil County Independent FF (Maryland, US)
- 2019 – SPECIAL MENTION. 60th edition of the International short film festival Brno16 (Czech Republic)
- 2019 – SPECIAL MENTION FOR DIRECTING. 40th European Short Film Festival of Villeurbanne (France)
- 2019 – Nomination «Best short film» Ukrainian Film Academy Awards (Kyiv, Ukraine)
- 2019 – Official selection. Prague Short Film Festival (Prague, Czech Republic)
- 2019 – Official selection. IndieCork Film Festival (Ireland)
- 2019 – Official selection. European Shorts. Sarajevo Film Festival (Sarajevo, Bosnia and Herzegovina)
- 2019 – Official selection. Central and Eastern European Film Festival CinEast (Luxembourg)
- 2019 – Official selection. 12th Bueu International Short Film Festival (Bueu (Pontevedra) Spain)
- 2019 – Official selection. Blow-Up Arthouse International Film Festival (Chicago, US)
- 2019 – Official selection. 19th New Horizons International Film Festival (Wroclaw, Poland)
- 2019 – Official selection. BEAST International Film Festival (Porto, Portugal)
- 2019 – Official selection. Ravac International Film Festival (RIFF) (Chisinau, Moldova)
- 2019 – Official selection. Cindependent Film Festival, Cincinnati (Ohio, US)
- 2019 – Official selection. Lublin Film Festival (Lublin, Poland)
- 2019 – Official selection. Korona Karpat – Truskavets International Film Festival (Truskavets, Ukraine)
- 2019 – Official selection. Kenya International Sports Film Festival (Nairobi, Kenya)
- 2019 – Official selection. 1st Film Frames International Short Film Festival (Pune, India)
- 2019 – Official selection. Short Competition, IFF «ZOOM – ZBLIŻENIA» (Jelenia Góra, Poland)
- 2019 – Official selection. Gdańsk DocFilm Festival (Gdansk, Poland)
- 2019 – Special screening. Locarno Film Festival, Filmmakers Academy (Locarno, Switzerland)
- 2019 – Special screening. Vienna Shorts International Festival (Vienna, Austria)
- 2019 – Special screening. Tallinn Black Nights Film Festival / PÖFF Shorts (Estonia)
- 2019 – Special screening. 38th Uppsala International Short Film Festival (Uppsala, Sweden)
- 2019 – Special screening. Rome Independent Film Festival, (RIFF) (Italy)
- 2019 – Special screening. European Film Forum Scanorama (Lithuania)
- 2019 – Special screening. Minimalen Short Film Festival (Trondheim, Norway)
- 2019 – Special screening. KISFF | Kyiv International Short Film Festival (Ukraine)
- 2019 – Special screening. Sofia International Film Festival (Sofia, Bulgaria)
- 2020 – BEST ACTOR. Kaniv International Film Festival (Ukraine)
- 2020 – BEST FILM 16th edition of the Jan Machulski Award (Warsaw, Poland)
- 2020 – BEST SHORT of months, Short Days Festival (Roma, Italy)
- 2020 – BEST CINEMATOGRAPHY 16th edition of the Jan Machulski Award (Warsaw, Poland)
- 2020 – SPECIAL MENTION. Budapest Independent Film Festival (Hungary)
- 2020 – Bronze award (Narrative short) Independent StarFilmfest, Freising (Bavaria, Germany)
- 2020 – Nomination Best Cinematography Grand OFF – World Independent Film Awards (Warsaw, Poland)
- 2020 – Official selection. Euregion Film Festival (Heerlen, Netherlands)
- 2020 – Official selection. Lago Film Fest – International Festival of Independent Cinema (Revine, Italy)
- 2020 – Special screening. Tampere Film Festival (Finland)
- 2020 – Special screening. Short Waves Festival (Poznań, Poland)
- 2020 – Special screening. Riga International Short Film Festival 2ANNAS (Latvia)
- 2020 – Special screening. Glasgow Short Film Festival (UK)
- 2020 – Special screening. Festival del Cinema Europeo (Lecce, Italy)
- 2020 – Special screening. Krakow Film Festival (Poland)
- 2020 – Special screening. OFF – Odense International Film Festival (Denmark)
- 2020 – Special screening. Helsinki International Film Festival – Love & Anarchy (Finland)
- 2020 – Special screening. Curtas Vila do Conde – International Short Film Festival (Portugal)
- 2020 – Special screening. DokuFest International Documentary and Short Film Festival Prizren (Kosova)
- 2020 – Special screening. FeKK Ljubljana Short Film Festival (Slovenia)
- 2020 – Special screening. Jerusalem Film Festival (Israel)
- 2020 – Special screening. ARTos Foundation (Nicosia, Cyprus)
- 2020 – Special screening. Helsinki International Film Festival – Love & Anarchy (Finland)
- 2020 – Special screening. Encounters Film Festival (Bristol, UK)
- 2020 – Special screening. Tirana International Film Festival (Albania)
- 2020 – Special screening. Festival del Cinema Europeo (Lecce, Italy)
- 2020 – Special screening. Braunschweig International Film Festival (Germany)
- 2020 – Special screening. Internationale Kurzfilmtage Winterthur The Short Film Festival of Switzerland
