= Coronation of the Word =

- Description: International Ukrainian literary contest
- Location: Kyiv, Ukraine
- Country: Ukraine
- Presented by: Tetiana Lohush and Yurii Lohush
- First award: 1999
- Website: koronatsiya.com

Coronation of the Word (Ukrainian: Коронація слова) is an international Ukrainian literary contest for novels, plays, screenplays, song lyrics and works for children. It was founded by Tetiana and Yurii Lohush with the aim of supporting contemporary Ukrainian culture, discovering new authors, publishing the best novels and stimulating literary, film and theatre production in Ukrainian.

== History ==
The idea for the contest emerged in the mid‑1990s, when the founders Tetiana and Yurii Lohush were looking for contemporary Ukrainian novels in Kyiv bookshops and found very few new works available.

Coronation of the Word was established in 1999 as a joint project with the television channel 1+1, initially as a competition for novels and film scripts. In 2000 a separate Screenplays category was formally introduced with the support of producer Oleksandr Rodniansky; that year thirteen new screenwriters were identified through the competition.

From 2005 the contest also began accepting plays, and from 2008 a category for song lyrics about love was added. In 2011 a separate category for works for children was created, and in 2012 the founders launched a distinct award, Golden Writers of Ukraine (Ukrainian: Золоті письменники України), to honour authors whose books had reached significant print runs.

In 2018 an international multi‑arts youth competition titled Young Coronation (Молода КороНація) was set up under the same umbrella.

== Format ==
Entries to Coronation of the Word are open to both established and emerging authors, with the only formal requirement being that texts must be written in the Ukrainian language. In each category three main prize‑winners are chosen, and a wide range of encouragement and special prizes are also awarded.

Over the years the contest has introduced and expanded several categories, including:

- Novels
- Screenplays
- Plays
- Song lyrics
- Works for children

== Jury ==
The competition has attracted jury members from the Ukrainian literary, theatre, film and music communities as well as international guests. Jury compositions have changed over time; among those who have served are:

- For song lyrics: performers and producers such as Zlata Ognevich, Oleksandr Ponomariov, Yurii Nikitin, Eduard Prystupa, Jamala, Ani Lorak, Oleksandr Zlotnyk, Oleksandr Yarmola, Illaria, Anatolii Matviichuk, Pavlo Shylko, Dmytro Klimashenko, Anzhelika Rudnytska, Foma, Katia Buzhynska, Eduard Klim and Mariia Burmaka.
- For plays: theatre directors, playwrights and actors including Stanislav Moiseiev, Pavlo Arie, Oleksandr Havrosh, Olena Bondarieva, Yaroslav Vereshchak, Bohdan Benyuk, Nataliia Sumska, Mark Brovun, Bohdan Strutynskyi and Vitalii Kino.
- For screenplays: filmmakers and critics such as Andrii Benkendorf, Krzysztof Zanussi, Viktor Andriienko, Dmytro Sukholytkyi‑Sobchuk, Volodymyr Tykhyi, Vasyl Portiak, Borys Savchenko, Taras Denysenko, Serhii Trymbach, Volodymyr Voitenko and Olha Samolevska.
- For children’s literature: publishers and authors including Volodymyr Bryzkyn, Mykola Martyniuk, Ivan Malkovych and Lesia Voronina.
- For novels: literary scholars, critics and publishers such as Ivan Dziuba, Yurii Mushketyk, Tamara Hundorova, Mykola Zhulyinskyi, Svitlana Skliar, Eleonora Simonova, Oleksandr Krasovytskyi, Maryna Oliinyk and Oleksandra Koval.

== “Children’s Choice” award ==
In 2015 the contest introduced a separate All‑Ukrainian literary prize “Children’s Choice” (Вибір дітей) for the best prose work for children. The award was founded by children’s writer and activist Larysa Nitsoi, who has described the prize as one where children from different Ukrainian cities read and score the books themselves.

According to the organisers, it is the first Ukrainian literary prize in which the winning book is chosen exclusively by children serving as the jury. The Children’s Choice prize is presented during the Coronation of the Word awards ceremony.

== Impact ==
Organisers state that Coronation of the Word has brought more than 250 authors to the attention of a broader reading public, including writers such as Iren Rozdobudko, Andrii Kokotiukha, Vasyl Shkliar, Volodymyr Lys and others. In the novels category alone, the contest has helped launch many debut novelists who have gone on to publish books with Ukrainian publishers.

Writer Yurii Mushketyk has described reading the contest winners as evidence that a new Ukrainian literature truly exists, calling this a turning point for contemporary Ukrainian writing.

== Film adaptations ==
A number of works first recognised by Coronation of the Word have later been adapted for film, including:

- Slovo House (Будинок «Слово»), a 2017 documentary directed by Taras Tomenko about the “Slovo” residential building for writers in Kharkiv; the film’s script was among the contest’s prize‑winners.
- The Nest of the Turtledove (Гніздо горлиці), a feature film directed by Taras Tkachenko and released in 2016, based on a script by Vasyl Melnyk which was awarded at the contest.
- The Century of Yakiv (Століття Якова), a TV mini‑series on 1+1 based on Volodymyr Lys’s novel of the same name, which had been awarded at Coronation of the Word.
- Eks (Екс), a historical drama film directed by Serhii Lysenko, written by Yaroslav Yarysh; the screenplay received a prize in the 2015 screenplays category.
- Volcano (Вулкан), a Ukrainian‑German‑Monégasque co‑production directed by Roman Bondarchuk, whose script (by Bondarchuk, Daria Averchenko and Alla Tiutiunnyk) was a laureate of the contest.
- Weightlifter (Штангіст), a 2018 Ukrainian‑Polish short film directed by Dmytro Sukholytkyi‑Sobchuk, whose script was awarded the Grand Coronation distinction.

== Stage adaptations ==
Many plays first recognised by Coronation of the Word have subsequently been staged at Ukrainian theatres, including works by Neda Nezhdana, Anna Bahriiana, Mariina Smilianets and others. Productions have been mounted at venues such as the Molodyi Theatre in Kyiv, the First Ukrainian Theatre for Children and Youth in Lviv, and the New Ukrainian Theatre Arts Centre in Kyiv.
