= Donetsk National Academic Ukrainian Musical and Drama Theatre =

Theatre in Donetsk, Ukraine

Donetsk Theatre
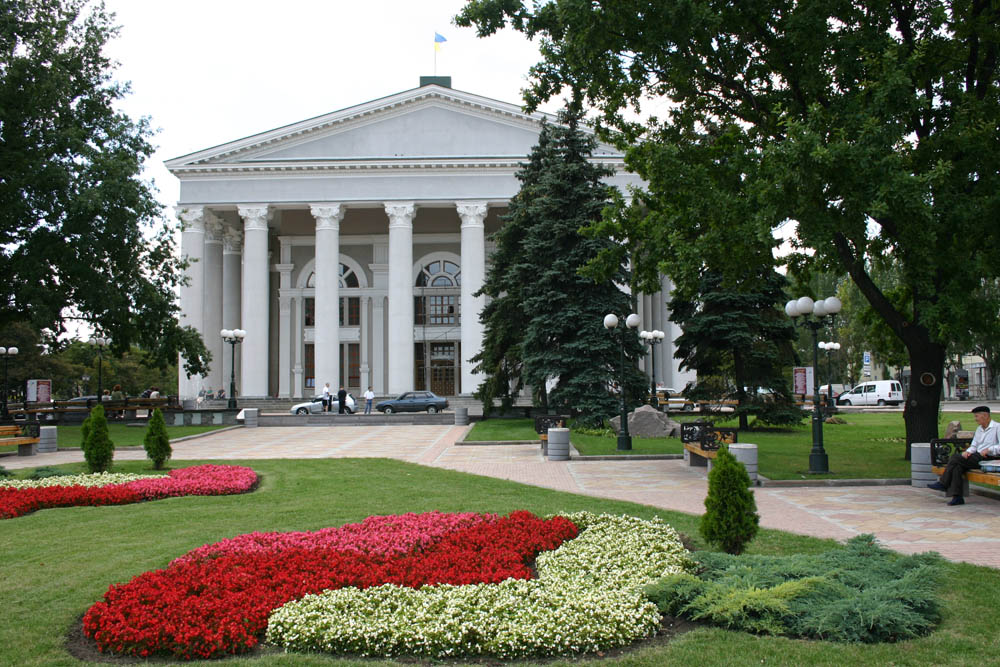
- The theatre in 2004.

General information
- Status: Operational
- Architectural style: Monumental Classicism
- Location: Artema St., 74a, Donetsk, Donetsk, Ukraine de-jure
- Coordinates: 48.0019°N 37.8027°E
- Opened: 1927

Website
- muzdrama.ru

The Donetsk National Academic Ukrainian Musical and Drama Theatre or Donetsk State Academic Musical and Drama Theatre "Mark Brovun" (Russian: Донецкий государственный академический музыкально-драматический театр имени М.М. Бровуна, romanized: Donetsky gosudarstvenny akademichesky muzykalno-dramatichesky teatr imeni M.M. Brovuna) is a theatre in Donetsk, Ukraine. It was founded in 1927 and was awarded national status in November 2009. It has hosted the regional theater festival "Theatrical Donbas" since 1992 and the "Golden Key" open festival performances and concerts for children and youth since 1997.

== History ==
The Donetsk National Academic Ukrainian Musical and Drama Theatre began in 1927 in Kharkiv, then the capital of Ukraine, with the creation of the Ukrainian Labour Theatre. Its purpose was to carry out cultural and educational missions in Eastern Ukraine. The troupe was formed from the actors of the Kharkiv State Folk Theatre and the Berezil Theatre. The first director was А. Zagarov, who had studied with Vladimir Nemirovich-Danchenko. A year later, V. Vasilko, a student of Les Kurbas who later became an Honoured People's Artist of Ukraine, was appointed the art director.

In 1933, at the invitation of the People's Commissariat of Education of Ukraine, the creative team was transferred to Donetsk (then Stalino), where the first season opened on November 7, 1933, with the premiere of I. Mikitenko's play The Bastille of the Virgin (Ukrainian: Бастилія божої матері).

During its first 10 years the theatre visited the main cities of the Donets Basin (Voroshilovgrad, Mariupol, Gorlovka, Donetsk, Makiivka and Slavyansk) and also travelled outside the region, to Baku, Minsk, Vitebsk, Gomel, Mogilev, Leningrad, Rostov-on-Don and Kyiv.

After the outbreak of the Great Patriotic War, the theatre was not completely evacuated. Most of the members went to the front. A small group of actors joined the Artyomovsk Theatre and were evacuated to Kyzylorda, Kazakh SSR. Another, somewhat bigger group joined the Stalin Drama Theatre in Horlivka on their way to Central Asia and worked in Jalal-Abad, Kyrgyz SSR. After the liberation of the Donets Basin in January and March 1944, both troupes returned to Stalino.

On September 28, 2001, the Theatre was granted Honorary Academic status, and on November 26, 2009, a Presidential Decree granted it National status.

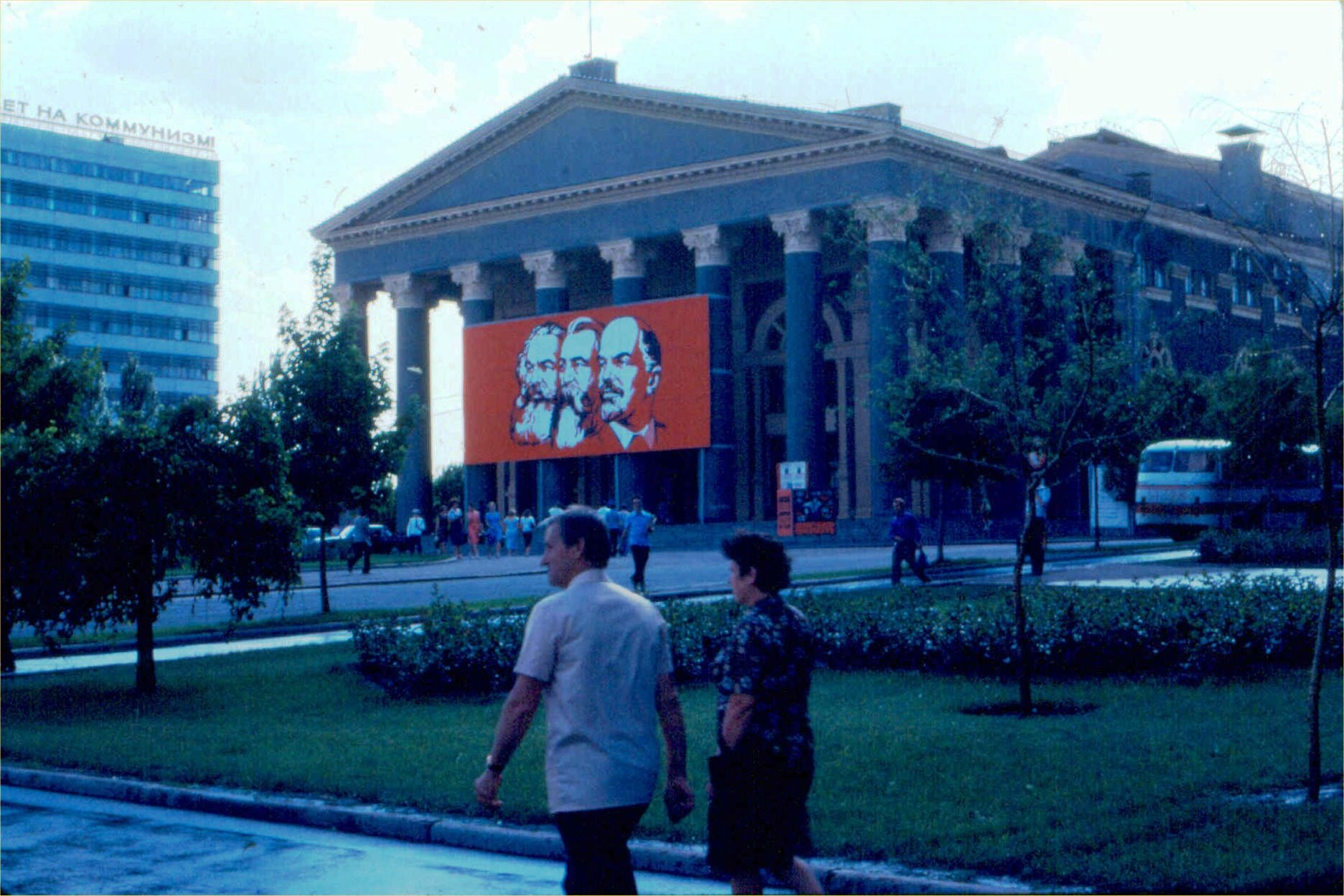
Drama Theatre in 1979

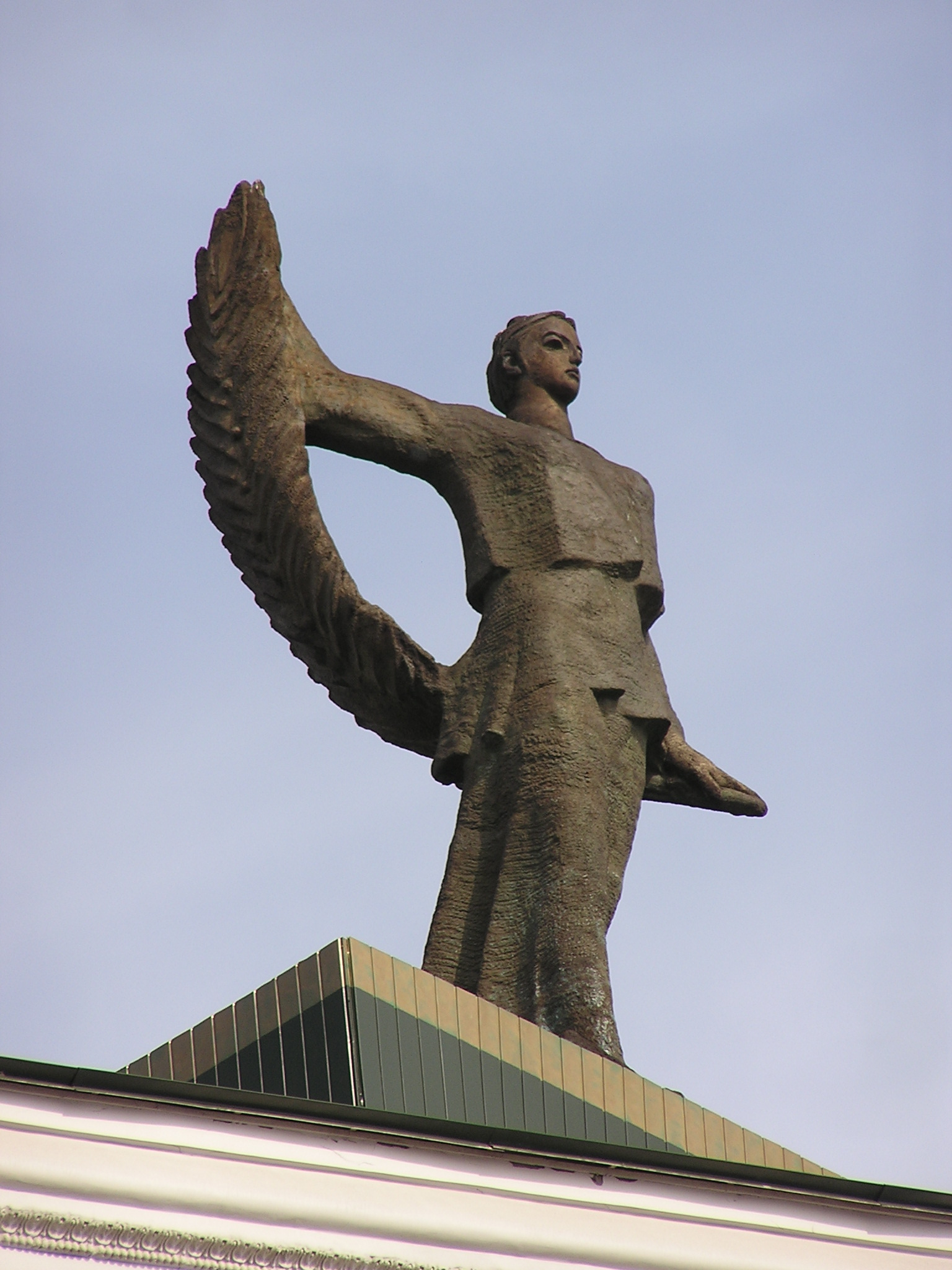
Melpomena Statue on the roof of the Theatre

In 2017, by the decree of the Head of the Donetsk People's Republic, the theater was named after the theatre reformer and former head Mark Matveevich Brovun.

== Building ==
For a long time, the theatre operated in the premises of Donetsk Musical Theatre (from 1947, the Donetsk Opera and Ballet Theatre). The present theatre building was built in 1961 to a design by architect Y. Chechik. In 2005, the theatre building and adjacent territory were reconstructed, forming a unique Donets Basin theatre complex with five scenes.

== Troupe ==
The theatre has its own professional orchestra directed by chief conductor Y. Kulakov, a group of artists and singers under the leadership of choirmaster T. Paschuk, and a professional ballet group led by chief choreographer Vladimir Maslov. Several People's and Honoured Artists of Ukraine work in the troupe.

== Performances ==
The theater became one of the centers of Ukrainian theatrical culture of the Donetsk region, so Ukrainian plays predominate in the repertory:

- Natalka Poltavka
- Moskal-Charivnik
- Eneyida by I.Kotlyarevskiy
- Shelmenko the Batman, Honcharovka brocage
- Blue Turkey shawl
- The Witch by G. Kvitka-Osnovyanenko
- My Thoughts by T. Shevchenko
- One Hundred Thousand by I. Karpenko-Kary
- Zillya (eng. - potion) by O.Kobylyanska
- Chasing Two Hares
- Ne sudylos’ (Eng. "It Was Not Destined")
- Talan (Eng. "Destiny") by M. Staritskiy
- Orgy, Kassandra by Lesya Ukrainka
- The Law by V. Vinnichenko
- Bitter Almond Fairy by I.Kocherga
- People's Malachy by M. Kulish
- Roksolana by P.Zagrebelniy

The company's repertoire includes various works from other countries:

- Twelfth Night, or What You Will
- The Taming of the Shrew by William Shakespeare
- Caligula by A.Camus
- The Government Inspector
- A Christmas Night
- Sorochyntsy Fair by N. Gogol
- Intrigue and Love by F. Schiller
- The Dancing Master by Lope de Vega
- The Marriage of Figaro by Mozart (libretto by Lorenzo Da Ponte)
- Bel Ami by Guy de Maupassant
- Colombe by J. Anouilh
- Zoyka Apartment by M. Bulgakov
- Some Like It Hot by A. Arkadin-Shkolnik, based on the Billy Wilder movie.

A small stage, created after the renovation of the theatre, functions as a place for creative exploration and experimentation.

Productions for young audiences include:

- Vasilisa the Beautiful
- Puss in Boots by S. Prokofiev
- Scarlet Flower
- Kotigoroshek by A.Shiyan
- The Nutcracker by A. Hoffmann
