= Capture of Donetsk (2014) =

2014 riot in Ukraine

- Part of the 2014 pro-Russian unrest in Ukraine
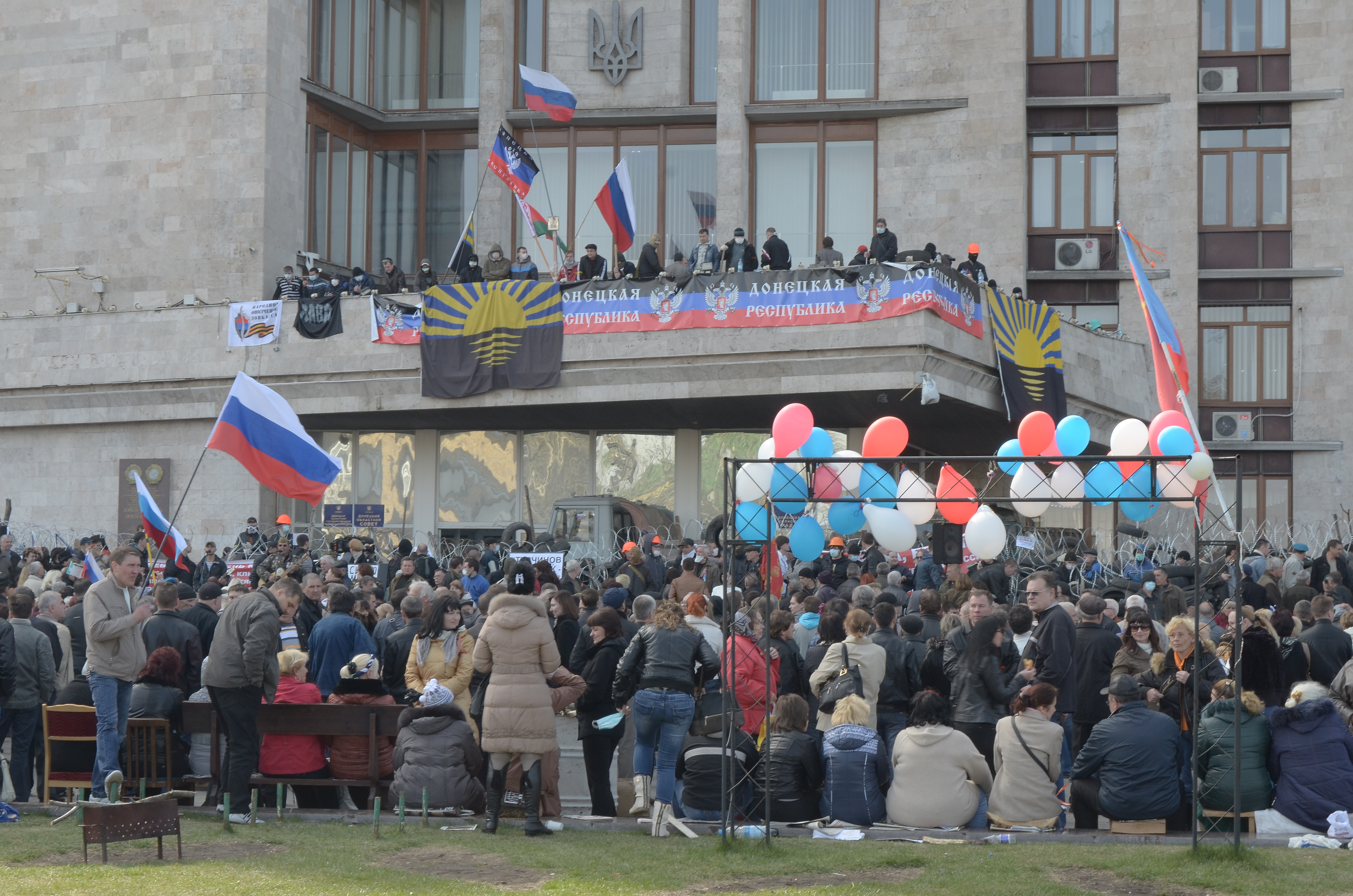
- Pro-Russian separatists occupying the Donetsk RSA building on 7 April 2014
- Date: 1 March – 1 May 2014 (2 months)
- Location: Donetsk, Donetsk oblast, Ukraine
- Caused by: Success of the pro-European Revolution of Dignity; Attempted removal of Russian as a minority language
- Goals: Union with Russia; Federalization
- Methods: Riots; Occupation of administrative buildings
- Result: Escalation into the war in Donbas; Establishment of Donetsk People's Republic

Parties
| Government of Ukraine; Pro-Ukrainian counter-protesters | (Russia) Pro-Russian protesters |

The eastern Ukrainian city of Donetsk was captured by pro-Russian separatists in 2014 during widespread unrest following the pro-European revolution of Dignity in the capital city of Kyiv in February. As a result, the Donetsk People's Republic (DPR) was promulgated, and Donetsk served as its capital. Since the Capture of Donetsk, the DPR has received no international recognition from any United Nations member state except Russia.

As of now, Russia remains in full control of the city after annexing the DPR (as part of the ongoing invasion of Ukraine), with Russian and Ukrainian forces still fighting in the area.

== Background ==
History of separatism within the Donetsk stretches back to 2005, where the organization Donetsk Republic was founded after Viktor Yushchenko came to power. It set the goal of forming the Donetsk Federal Republic, and began to collect signatures for holding a referendum. Despite a ban, the organization did not stop its activities, conducting jointly with the Communist Party of Ukraine and other pro-Russian movements separatist actions.

During the pro-EU Euromaidan movement, a pro-Russian opposition movement known as anti-Maidan emerged, particularly in eastern Ukraine, where there was a large Russian speaking population.

On December 4, thirteen days after the beginning of Euromaidan, around 15,000 people gathered at a pro-Yanukovych rally in Donetsk, many of them rode busses to the rally.

On February 18, the revolution of Dignity began in Kyiv. On February 21, following the signing of an agreement between Yanukovych and the opposition, police guarding the government sector of Kyiv withdrew, allowing the opposition to take control. The next day, parliament voted to remove Yanukovych from office. Meanwhile, in Donetsk, a pro-Russian rally was held.

On February 28, pro-Russian activist Pavel Gubarev, leader of the Donbas People's Militia, appeared during a Donetsk City Council meeting and issued an ultimatum to the council to not recognise the new Ukrainian government, which was rejected.

== Pro-Russian Protests ==
On March 1, 2014, about 10,000–15,000 people gathered for a rally in support of Berkut fighters who killed rioters in Kyiv. The participants of the rally expressed distrust of the head of the Donetsk regional state administration Andrei Shishatsky and announced the commander of the People's Defence of Donbass Pavel Gubarev as their leader. On the same day, the Donetsk City Council initiated a referendum on the status of the Donetsk region, and the initiative of the city council was supported by the Donetsk Regional Council.

At about 12:00, supporters of Pavel Gubarev were joined by activists of the separatist organization "Donetsk Republic", who, under anti-Ukrainian slogans, demanded the voluntary resignation of Andrei Shishatsky, and then moved to storm the building of the regional state administration. The protestors faced the Special Forces "Griphon" unit, who held the building for half an hour until being forced to retreat. Under the walls of the Regional State Administration, demonstrators demanded to hold a referendum on the independence of Donbass. The pro-Russian activists lowered the flag of Ukraine from the flagpole, replacing it with a Russian flag; the flag of the Donetsk oblast on another flagpole was not changed by protesters.

In the evening, the Donetsk City Council, pressured by the independence activists, convened an extraordinary session, which unanimously decided to hold a referendum on the region remaining a part of Ukraine. In addition, city deputies decided to grant the Russian language the status of an official language (alongside Ukrainian), to establish a moratorium on price increases and reduce the level of social payments. This was to create a municipal police force and recognize Russia as a strategic partner of the region. It was also recommended to the Donetsk Regional Council (together with the Luhansk Regional Council) to create a commission for the formation of the stabilization fund of the Donbass.

On March 3, pro-Russian activists seized part of the building of the Donetsk Regional State Administration, where, at a meeting of the regional council, deputies elected a new chairman of the council (Andriy Shyshatskiy) and supported the decision to hold a referendum on the territory of the Donetsk region on the most pressing issues for residents of the region, condemning calls for the region's separation from Ukraine. About 1,000 people with Russian tricolors (led by self-proclaimed Governor Pavel Gubarev) stormed the session hall of the regional council, causing a clash. Pavel Gubarev addressed the audience; in his speech, he called himself the "people's governor" and informed representatives of the Russian media that his self-proclaimed regional state administration did not accept the central government in Kyiv. In addition, the self-proclaimed governor announced plans to create a "provisional government of Donbass" and self-defense forces, and proposed that the leadership of the Air Force, prosecutor's office and the SBU of the region take an oath to the "people's authorities". Pro-Russian activists blocked the institution, preventing employees from leaving it; it was also reported that about three deputies who did not have time to leave the regional council were forced to write statements about the drafting of their deputy powers.

During the seizure of the administration, unknown people attacked the head of the regional council Andrei Shishatsky, who managed to free himself from the attackers thanks to police officers and the SBU, but during other events in the administration, the internal affairs officers did not resist the activists.

On March 5, under the pretext of detecting an explosive device in the building, the police cleared the regional administration building of protesters, and the Ukrainian flag was once again hung over the building. By 16:00, about 5,000–7,000 referendum supporting protestors had gathered under the administration, including activists of the "People's Militia of Donbas", "Russian bloc" and activists from Russia (including the former leader of the far-right organization "Shield of Moscow" Oexiy Khudyakov). At the same time, a rally of supporters of Ukraine's unity began at Svobody Square, which gathered about 7,000–10,000 protesters. Some time after the start of the rally near the building of the regional administration, protesters led by Gubarev began to storm the building; there were clashes with soldiers of internal troops and police guarding the building. As a result of clashes with the police, the supporters of the referendum once again occupied the RSA (Regional State Administration) building and hung the Russian flag over it.

After the seizure of the RSA building, the pro-Russian forces split. About a few hundred of them supported Pavel Gubarev and went to seize the building of the Main Directorate of the Treasury in the Donetsk region, first mistakenly arriving at the Financial Inspection building, before eventually beginning a blockade of the correct building. At the same time, another group of about 1,500 pro-Russian activists moved towards Freedom Square, where they got into a fight with rallying supporters of Ukraine. Around 200 supporters of the referendum remained in the RSA building.

The next day, March 6, at about 06:45, the police freed the RSA building from the protesters, detaining 70 people, and the Ukrainian flag was returned to the building. At the same time, the Security Service of Ukraine arrested Pavel Gubarev. In the evening of this day, about 200 supporters of Gubarev picketed the building of the Main Directorate of the SBU in the Donetsk region, demanding the release of their leader.

On March 13, a clash occurred between participants of an anti-war rally for Ukraine's unity and pro-Russian activists. Law enforcement officers and self-defense groups sided with anti-separatists, which allowed most of them to leave Lenin Square. After the main group of anti-separatist protestors left, police officers hid members of self-defense groups in their bus. They surrounded the supporters of the union of the Donbass with Russia, piercing wheels, smashed windows and threw firecrackers at the cars; tear gas was sprayed. The police managed to detain several attackers, but under pressure from the crowd they were released. According to official information, one person died from stab wounds during the fight and 10 people were hospitalized; three were taken to the neurosurgical department of the M. Kalinin Hospital. According to media reports, the death toll is 2–3 people; at least 50 people were injured.

On March 19, the Security Service of Ukraine arrested Andrei Purgin, the leader of the Donetsk People's Republic, who took part in the assaults on the RSA building on March 3 and 5.

== Separatist takeover ==
On April 6, Donetsk independence activists gathered in Lenin Square. After the end of the rally, around a thousand protesters marched along Artema Street to the RSA, which they began to storm. Protesters gathered in front of the building and clashed with police who guarded a barbed wire gate on the side of the building, eventually overwhelming them and breaking into the courtyard. Meanwhile, another group threw a grenade inside the building and subsequently stormed it. Despite bringing in a water canon, police were forced to withdraw from the administration, leaving it under control of protesters. There were reportedly 100 protestors occupying the RSA following the police withdrawal.

On April 7, in the session hall of the Donetsk Regional State Administration, protesters proclaimed a "declaration of sovereignty of the Donetsk People's Republic", which was proclaimed on the territory of the Donetsk region. they also announced a referendum for independence to take place no later than May 11.

At around 03:32 on April 7, protesters stormed an SBU building at 62 Shchorsa Street, making no clear demands. Protesters then barricaded themselves inside with barbed wire. By evening, Ukrainian forces had retaken the building. Also on April 7, a group of unknown people drove up to the building of the Regional State Television and Radio Company (ODTRK) located at 61 Kuibyshev Street and fired several shots into the air. They were later forced to flee the scene when police stationed in the building's courtyard returned fire.

On April 11, Arseniy Yatsenyuk, the Prime Minister of Ukraine, visited Donetsk and offered to grant the east of the country greater autonomy.

On April 12, protesters seized the Interior Ministry in Donetsk, but failed to take over the prosecutor's office. Following negotiations, the head of the Ministry of Internal Affairs in the Donetsk region, Kostyantyn Pozhidayev, resigned.

On April 16, separatists, some armed with machine guns, seized the city hall building at 98 Artema Street. Some of these separatists came from the Kharkiv-based mixed martial arts group 'Oplot', which would later develop into the Oplot Brigade. One of the leaders of the group, Yevhen Zhylin, described the events surrounding the capture of the city hall:

Everyone hoped that it would be like in Crimea. We would turn to Russia and everything would be fine. "Oplot" was almost the only public organization that had a power block at that time. And we seized the city administration building and defended it so that no one would rob it.

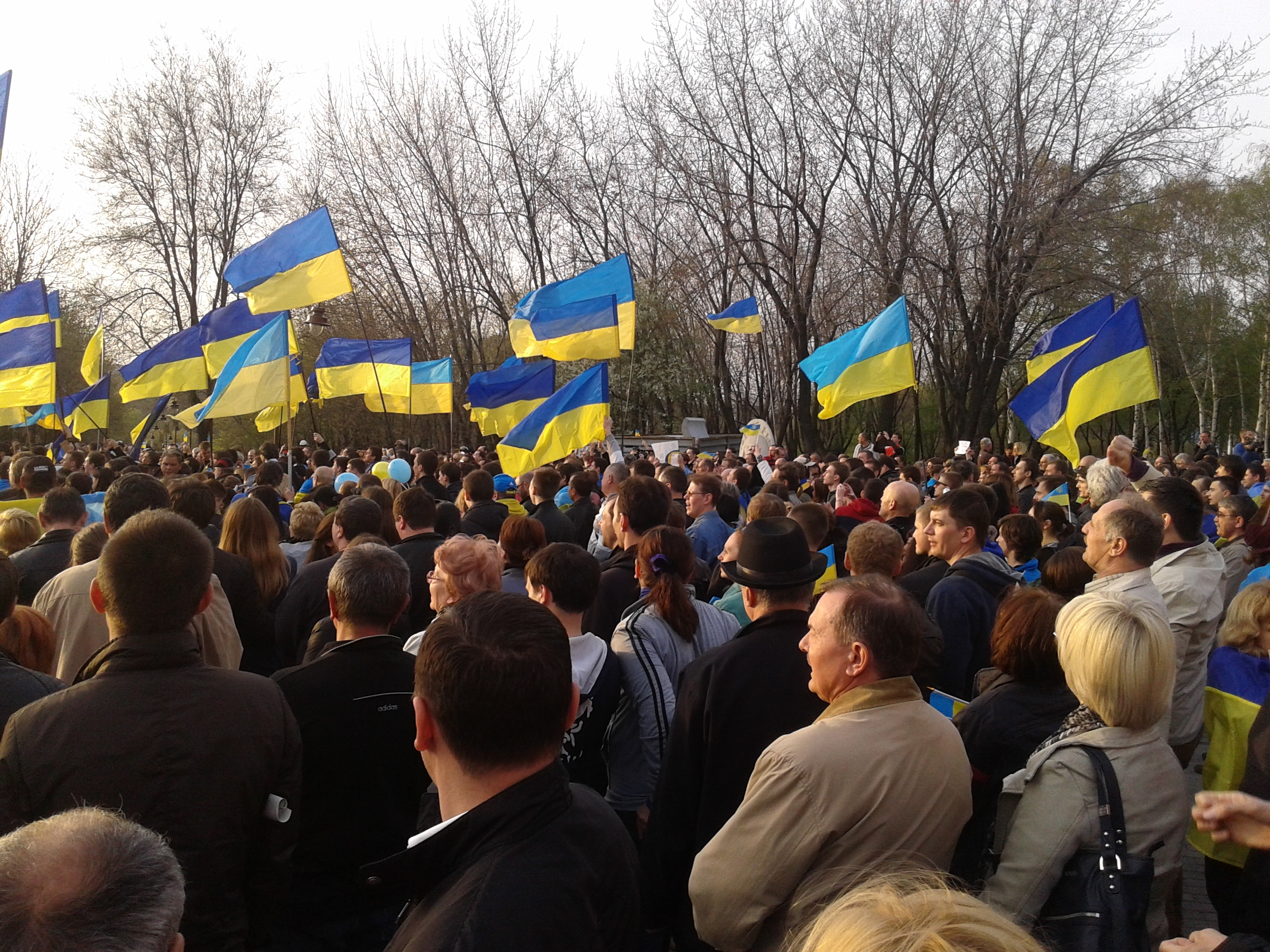
Pro-Ukrainian protesters rally in Donetsk on April 17.

At 18:00 on April 17, a pro-Ukrainian rally took place in Victory park with around 5,000 in attendance at its peak. Protestors sung the national anthem of Ukraine and waved Ukrainian flags.

On April 27, during a rally in Lenin square, one of the speakers at the event called on protesters take over the ODTRK and prevent the airing of Ukrainian television channels in favour of pro-Russian channels. Following this, 300-400 protesters began moving towards the television building, on the way stopping at the International Business Centre, where they replaced a Ukrainian flag with a DPR flag, before continuing their march. Upon their arrival at the ODTRK, the protesters faced the building's security and police, some reportedly armed with Kalashnikov rifles, who defended the building. Following negotiations, a small group of separatists were permitted to enter the ODTRK, whilst the majority remained outside. The Ukrainian flag was removed and the DPR flag was raised. Around 30 police officers remained near the building, however, they did not interfere with the protester's activities. Having captured the television station, separatist leaders began making preparations for the broadcasting of Russian news channels such as Russia-24. Members of the "Oplot" group were reported to have taken part in the capture of the building.

On April 28, around 2,000 people gathered in a pro-Ukrainian rally. During the rally, multiple men dressed in military fatigues and wielding baseball bats entered the crowd and began to attack protesters, who responded by lighting fireworks and firecrackers. Ukrainian riot police managed to drive away the militants ten minutes after the beginning of the attack. As a result, 14 people were injured and 5 were unaccounted for.

During May Day celebrations on May 1, a few thousand festivalgoers gathered in Lenin square before marching south along Artema Street towards a registration office on Polehlykh Komunariv avenue, where they raised the flag of the DPR with no resistance. They then continued their march to a police station located on Chelyuskintsiv Avenue to ensure the police's loyalty to the republic. Police agreed to work with the protestors, who arrived at around 11:20. After the Ukrainian flag was replaced with the DPR flag at the station, an announcement was made ordering protestors to attack the prosecutor's office on Henerala Antonova street to free arrested activists.

At 12:20, the crowd, calling for the prosecutor to come out, arrived at the entrance to the prosecutor's office, which was guarded by riot police armed with shields. Within three minutes of their arrival, intense fighting had broken out, with officers detonating stun grenades and releasing tear gas whilst protestors threw rocks and chanted "fascists" at the officers. Being pushed back, the police also used shotguns loaded with rubber bullets. By 12:37, the rioters had retreated due to the tear gas. During this pause in fighting, injured officers were evacuated.

Meanwhile, the rioters moved north to attack the courtyard of the building, throwing petrol bombs at the police, who formed a testudo formation, though by 12:56 protestors had surrounded the police in the formation, who surrendered and were disarmed. An armoured personnel carrier was sent to attempt to relieve the siege but was forced to retreat as the crowd advanced towards it.

== Aftermath ==
On May 6, heavily armed separatists surrounded the Donetsk Regional Military College and blockaded it. Two hours after their arrival, the militants left following negotiations with the commanders of the base, which now hung the flag of the DPR.

The referendum designed to legitimize the DPR was held on May 11, 2014, and its result, according to the announcement of the initiators, was that 89.07 percent of voters voted for the proclamation of the Donetsk People's Republic.

The official report on the human rights situation in Ukraine by the Office of the UN High Commissioner for Human Rights states that on May 15, the UOC-KP condemned violence and threats to the life and health of the clergy and believers of eastern Ukraine by armed groups, and also states that numerous attacks on an interreligious prayer marathon (participated in by all major denominations except for the Moscow Patriarchate) are taking place in Donetsk, including severe beatings of participants, destruction of property and threats. Reports of attacks have also come from other denominations, such as Protestants.

On May 16, separatists seized the headquarters of the Eastern Command of the National Guard and the headquarters was relocated.

On the morning of May 26, separatists captured Donetsk Airport. In response, the National Guard issued an ultimatum, calling for militants to leave the airport, which was rejected, causing the Ukrainian army to launch an assault on the airport. Paratroopers and helicopters assisted by airstrikes, managed to recapture the airport by evening. 33-50 militants were killed in the attack.

On 29 May, the Vostok Battalion expelled other pro-Russian separatist factions from the Donetsk separatist headquarters. According to Radio Free Europe/Radio Liberty, the raid was widely seen as a part of an attempt by a Moscow-connected faction to take control over the insurgency in the Donbas from "ragtag" elements associated with Igor Girkin and Alexander Borodai, with Mark Galeotti characterizing the battalion as a "more disciplined" force associated with Russian military intelligence.

Beginning in June 2014, the separatists began seizing bank branches, causing disruptions to the banking system.

On June 16, the separatists seized the Treasury and the NBU office in response, the NBU disabled the payment and settlement system in the Donetsk region and moved the Accounting Chamber, 11 banks, 10 branches and 1,576 branches from Donetsk.

On 27 June, separatist militants captured military base No. 3004 of the Ukrainian National Guard in Donetsk after a seven-hour battle. It was the fourth reported attempt to capture the base.

On July 6, due to militant attacks, PrivatBank and Nova Poshta were forced to close in the city.

On July 10, the Kirova Palace of Culture was seized.

On November 24, militants seized the premises of Pivdenkombank in Donetsk.

On November 26, militants seized the buildings of the Chamber of Commerce and Industry, the regional employment center and the Pension Fund.

On November 29, militants stole a large number of blank passport forms from the State Migration Service in the city.

On November 30, militants seized a branch of Oschadbank in four districts of the city.

== See also ==
- Outline of the Russo-Ukrainian War
