= List of films about the Russo-Ukrainian war =

The depiction of the Russo-Ukrainian War in cinema has become an important phenomenon of modern Ukrainian cinema. It has been described by film journalists and Ukrainians as not only a form of artistic expression, but also a means of understanding events, maintaining public spirit and morale, coping with trauma, and a tool for informing the world about the tragedies, heroism, and struggle of the Ukrainian people as a result of the Russian invasion of the territory of Ukraine since the Spring of 2014.

Two films about the war won the Academy Award for Best Documentary Feature: 20 Days in Mariupol in 2024 and Mr Nobody Against Putin in 2026.

== Movies ==
Year	Language	Name	Genre	Director	Country	Synopsis
2014	Ukrainian	Україна: вижити у вогні / Ukraine: Surviving the Fire	Documentary	Khrystyna Bondarenko	Ukraine	
2014	Ukrainian	На лінії вогню / In the Line of Fire	Documentary	Serhii Yakymenko	Ukraine	
2014	Russian	Варя / Boiling	Documentary	Alyona Polunina	Russia	Film documenting the trip of Russian volunteer Varvara Darevska, who assisted the Armed Forces of Ukraine, to Ukraine.
2014	Russian	ДНР, або Химерна історія країни-саморобки / DPR, or the Quirky History of a Self-Made Country	Documentary	Anthony Batts	Great Britain	Film documenting the first weeks (April–May 2014) of the Donetsk People's Republic breakaway state and its supporters.
2014	Ukrainian, Russian	Наша Надія / Our Hope	Documentary	Volodymyr Tykhyi, Yulia Shashkova	Ukraine	Ukrainian film documenting the life story of Ukrainian pilot and politician Nadiya Savchenko. including her detention and trial.
2014	Ukrainian, Russian, Surzhik	На передовій / On the Front Line	Documentary		Ukraine	Film documenting military events in Eastern Ukraine
2014	Ukrainian, Surzhik	Лист бійців АТО Путіну / A Letter from ATO Fighters to Putin	Documentary	Volodymyr Tykhyi	Ukraine	
2014	Ukrainian	Війна за свій рахунок / War at your Own Expense	Short Documentary	Leonid Kanter, Ivan Yasnii	Ukraine	Film about the National Guard of Ukraine and the training of new troops.
2014	Ukrainian	Контакт / Contact	Documentary	Mustafa Nayyem, Bohdan Kutiepov	Ukraine	
2014	Ukrainian	(Не)прихована війна / (Un)hidden war	Documentary		Ukraine	
2014	Ukrainian, Russian	Битва за Дніпро / Battle for the Dnipro	Documentary	Andriy Nesterenko	Ukraine	Film documenting reforms that took place in Dnipropetrovsk.
2014		Военный корреспондент	Television film, War	Pavel Ignatov	Russia	
2015	Ukrainian	Капелани / Chaplains	Documentary	Valentin Degtyarenko	Ukraine	Film documenting the Russo-Ukrainian war from the perspective of Ukrainian priests.
2015	Russian	Шов: Психолог на войне / Shov: Psychologist for War	Documentary	Lidia Starodubtseva	Ukraine; Russia	
2015	Russian	Укропи Донбасу / Dill of Donbass	Documentary	Ruslan Horovyi	Ukraine	Film documenting life in Eastern Ukraine during combat and Russian occupation.
2015	Ukrainian	Captum / Prisoner	Drama	Anatoly Mateshko	Ukraine	
2015	Ukrainian, Russian, English	Міна / Mine	Short documentary	Вовка Соловей	Ukraine	
2015	Ukrainian	Добровольці Божої чоти / Volunteers of God's Choir	Documentary	Leonid Kanter, Ivan Yasnii	Ukraine	Full-length documentary about Ukrainian defenders at the Donetsk airport.
2015	Russian	Хто нас розвів? / Who Led Us Away?	Documentary	Yevhenii Lesnoi	Russia	
2015	Russian	Ті, що пережили пекло / Those Who Survived Hell	Short Documentary	Oleksiy Bida, Anna Perepelitsa	Ukraine	Film documenting the testimony of people who survived Pro-Russian separatist captivity and torture.
2015	Russian	Близький далекий схід / Middle Far East	Documentary	Philip Remunda	Czech Republic	
2015	Ukrainian, Russian	Аліса у Країні війни / Alice in the Land of War	Documentary	Alisa Kovalenko, Lyubov Durakova	Poland	
2016	Russian, Ukrainian, Romanian	Маріуполіс / Mariupolis	Documentary	Mantas Kvedaravičius	Lithuania; Germany; France; Ukraine	Film documenting the everyday life of ordinary residents of Mariupol, Shirokyny, and Sartana during the war, amid extreme conditions of shelling and destruction. The film's premiere took place at the 66th Berlin Film Festival.
2016	Russian	Вибір Олега / Oleg's Choice	Documentary	Olena Voloshyn, James Keough	France	Film about the personal motives for the participation and demoralization of Russian volunteers in the war, as well as their. It was presented at the FIPA and "One World" film festivals.
2016	Ukrainian	Поверни мені ім'я / Give Me Back my Name	Documentary	Snizhana Potapchuk	Ukraine	Film about the search for the bodies of dead Ukrainian servicemen.
2016	Russian	Рідні / Relatives	Documentary	Vitaly Manskyi	Germany; Latvia; Estonia; Ukraine	Film about how relatives living in Lviv, in the territory controlled by DPR militants, and in Sevastopol, annexed by Russia, react to the events of the Russo-Ukrainian war.
2016	Ukrainian, Russian	Десять секунд / Ten Seconds	Documentary	Julia Hontaruk	Ukraine	Film based on the events following the shelling of the "East" residential quarter of the city of Mariupol by pro-Russian militants on January 24, 2015.
2016		Море волнуется / The Sea is Agitated	Drama	Aleksandr Barshak	Russia	
2016		Я з тобою / I'm With You	Crime, Drama	Oleg Turanskiy	Ukraine	
2016		Под солнцем / Under the Sun	Drama	Igor Parfenov	Ukraine	
2016		Однажды в Украине. Война / Once Upon a Time in Ukraine: The War	Drama	Igor Parfenov	Ukraine	
2017	Lithuanian, Ukrainian, Russian, French	Іній / Frost	War film, drama	Sharunas Bartas	Lithuania; France; Ukraine; Poland	A young Lithuanian, Rokas, drives a humanitarian aid truck with his girlfriend Inga to the Donbas region of Ukraine where, amid the violence and death of the war in Donbas, they meet different war reporters.
2017	Ukrainian, Russian	Кіборги / Cyborgs	Action, War film, Drama	Akhtem Seitablayev	Ukraine	Ukrainian war drama film about the Cyborgs, the Ukrainian defenders in the Second Battle of Donetsk Airport during the war in Donbas.
2017		Крым / Crimea	Action, Drama	Aleksey Pimanov	Russia	
2017		Leanders letzte Reise / Leander's Last Journey	Drama, Romance, War	Nick Baker-Monteys	Germany	
2017		Апостасия / Forgotten by God	Drama, Family,	Aleksey Muradov	Russia	
2017		Тримай біля серця / Keep Close To Your Heart	Drama, War	Valeriy Shalyga	Ukraine	
2017		Обезьяна, страус и могила / Monkey, Ostrich and Grave	Drama, Horror, War	Oleg Mavromati Viktor Lebedev	Belarus; United States	
2018	Ukrainian, Russian	Позивний «Бандерас» / Call Sign "Banderas"	War film, Drama, Detective	Zaza Buadze	Ukraine	War drama film based on the diaries of the national guard Serhiy Bashkov with the call sign "Banderas", and the stories of ATO soldiers.
2018	Ukrainian, Russian	Міф / Myth	Documentary	Leonid Kanter, Ivan Yasnii	Ukraine	Film documenting the life and death of opera singer Vasyl Slipak and his joining of the Ukrainian volunteer movement before being killed by a sniper's bullet.
2018	Russian, Ukrainian	Донбас / Donbass	Drama	Sergey Loznytsia	Ukraine; Germany; France; Netherlands; Romania	Drama film containing thirteen short stories about life in Russia-occupied territories, each representing reconstructions of real events recorded in professional reports, amateur videos on YouTube, and memories of local residents.
2018		Kona fer í stríð / Woman at War	Adventure, Comedy, Drama, Thriller	Benedikt Erlingsson	France; Iceland; Ukraine	
		Посттравматична рапсодія / Post-Traumatic Rhapsody	Fantasy, History, War	Pavlo Kogut	Ukraine	
2019	Ukrainian	Атлантида /Atlantis	Drama	Valentin Vasyanovych	Ukraine	Drama film taking place in 2025, following the victory of Ukraine against Russia and the return to now-inhabitable territories devastated by war and occupation.
2019	Ukrainian, Russian, English	Іловайськ 2014. Батальйон Донбас / Ilovaisk 2014. Battalion Donbas	Action, War drama	Ivan Tymchenko	Ukraine	Ukrainian feature film directed about the battles for Ilovaisk during the War in Donbas.
2019	Ukrainian	Мати Апостолів / Mother of the Apostles	War drama	Zaza Buadze	Ukraine	Film based on real events that took place in the East of Ukraine in 2014 about a mother's search for her son following news of his plane being shot down.
2019	Ukrainian, Russian	Черкаси / Cherkasy	War drama	Timur Yashchenko	Ukraine	Ukrainian feature film directed by Tymur Yashchenko about the defense of the eponymous naval Natya-class minesweeper, blocked by Russian troops in Donuzlav Bay, Crimea during the 2014 capture of Southern Naval Base. The film was created with the support of the State Cinema of Ukraine.
2019	Ukrainian, Russian	Східняк / Skhidnyak	Comedy, Road movie	Andy Yves (Andriy Ivanyuk)	Ukraine	Comedy film based on real events during the Russian-Ukrainian war involving two soldiers traveling through various front line villages.
2019		Додому Evge / Homeward	Drama	Nariman Aliev	Ukraine	
2019		Одного разу в місті на камені / Once Upon a Time in the City on the Stone	Comedy, Crime	Andriy Zayets	Ukraine	
2019		Ополченочка / Militia Girl	War	Aleksey Kozlov	Russia	
2019		Донбасс. Окраина / Donbass. Borderland.	War	Renat Davletyarov	Russia	
2019		Забуті / The Forgotten	Drama, Romance, War	Daria Onishchenko	Switzerland; Ukraine	
2020		Із зав'язаними очима / Blindfold	Drama, Sport	Taras Dron	Ukraine	
2020		Наші Котики / Our Kitties	Comedy	Volodymyr Tykhyi	Canada; Ukraine; United States	
2020		Плохие дороги / Bad Roads	Drama	Natalya Vorozhbyt	Ukraine	
2021	Ukrainian	Шлях поколінь / The Path of Generations	Documentary	Mykhailo Uhman	Ukraine	Film documenting events that took place during the existence of the Ukrainian Insurgent Army.
2021		Пункт пропуска / Checkpoint		Vera Sokolova	Russia	
2021		Відблиск / Reflection	Drama, War	Valentyn Vasyanovych	Ukraine	
2021		Солнцепёк / Hotsunlight	Action, Drama, Thriller, War	Maksim Brius Mikhail Vasserbaum	Russia	
2021		Бог простить / God Will Forgive	Action, Drama, War	Hovhannes Khachatryan	Ukraine	
2021		Outside the Wire	Action, Adventure, Fantasy, Sci-Fi	Mikael Håfström	Hungary; United States	
2022	Ukrainian	Бачення метелика / Vision of a Butterfly	Military drama	Maksym Nakonechnyi	Ukraine	Military drama about an aerial scout with the call sign "Butterfly", who returns from captivity.
2022	Moldavian	The Road to War: Irpin	Documentary	Viorika Tataru, Andriy Kaptarenko	Moldova	
2022		Вузький міст / The Narrow Bridge	Drama	Boris Kvashnev	Georgia; Ukraine	
2022		Обмін / Exchange	War	Vladimir Kharchenko-Kulikovskiy	Ukraine	
2022		Подвійний іммельманн / Double Immelmann	Drama	Vira Yakovenko	Ukraine	
2022		Кордон / The Border	Drama, War	Andrey Kavun	Ukraine	
2022		Лучшие в аду / Best in Hell	War	Andrey Batov	Russia	
2022		Снайпер. Білий ворон / Sniper: The White Raven	Drama, War	Maryan Bushan	Ukraine	
2022		Клондайк / Klondike	Drama, War	Maryna Er Gorbach	Turkey; Ukraine	
2023	English	Superpower	Documentary	Sean Penn, Aaron Kaufman	United States	A 2023 documentary about Russia's full-scale invasion of Ukraine. The film profiles Volodymyr Zelenskyy's atypical career path through the eyes of Sean Penn as he seeks to understand Ukraine's recent history.
2023	Ukrainian	Евакуація / Evacuation	Documentary	Rostislav Gerashchenko	Ukraine	Film documenting the IBC, one of the most organized volunteer centers in the Irpin region during the Russo-Ukrainian war, and the evacuation of Irpin residents of the Buchan district.
2023	Ukrainian	20 днів у Маріуполі / 20 Days in Mariupol	Documentary	Mstislav Chernov	Ukraine	The film tells the story of the twenty days Chernov spent with his colleagues in the besieged city of Mariupol in February–March 2022 in the first weeks of the full-scale Russian invasion of Ukraine. Chernov compiled footage that he collected in Mariupol together with the team from PBS's Frontline and the Associated Press (AP).
2023	French	Ukraine, sur les traces des bourreaux / Ukraine, in the Traces of Executioners	Documentary	Manon Loiseau, Ksenia Bolchakova	Ukraine	The film deliberates war crimes during the Russian invasion of Ukraine in the north of the Kyiv region during the occupation in 2022, including murders, torture, rape, and the deportation of children and adults. This investigation examines the war crimes committed and planned by Vladimir Putin and his regime step by step, based on witness statements and written evidence.
2023		Шлях поколінь / The Way of Generations	Drama	Volodymyr Sidko	Ukraine	
2023		Мирний-21 / Myrnyi-21	War	Akhtem Seitablayev	Ukraine	
2023		Позывной «Пассажир» / Call Sign "Passenger"	Drama, War	Ilya Kazankov	Russia	
2023		Сірі бджоли / Grey Bees	Drama	Dmytro Moiseiev	Ukraine	
2023		Лишайся онлайн / Stay Online	Drama	Eva Strelnikova	Ukraine	
2023		Свидетель / Witness	Drama	David Dadunashvili	Russia	
2023		Буча / Bucha	Thriller	Stanislav Tiunov	Ukraine	
2023		Юрик / Yuryk	Drama, Television film, War	Oleksandr Tymenko	Estonia; Ukraine	
2023		Новорічна зміна / New Year's Change	Television film	Yulia Pavlova	Ukraine	
2024	Russian	Russians at War	Documentary	Anastasia Trofimova	Canada; France	Anastasia Trofimova gains unprecedented access to follow a Russian Army battalion in Ukraine. Without any official clearance or permits, she earns the trust of foot soldiers and over 7 months embeds herself with the battalion as it makes its way across the frontlines.
2024	Ukrainian, Russian	The Hardest Hour / Dovha Doba	Documentary	Alan Badoev	Ukraine	Documentary film created from 200 hours of amateur film shot by Ukrainians on their mobile phones.
2024	Ukrainian	Війна за море: від Дніпра до Криму / War for the Sea: from the Dnieper to the Crimea	Documentary	GUR	Ukraine	The film reveals the details of the combat missions of the special units of the Main Directorate of Intelligence of the Ministry of Defense of Ukraine and other components of the Security and Defense Forces, carried out in 2022-2023 on the Dnieper, Kakhovka Reservoir, and in the Black Sea. It covers landings in Enerhodar; the landing and creation of a bridgehead on the left bank of the Kherson region; the return of control over oil and gas production platforms in the Black Sea; sea raids to Crimea; and the destruction of Russian ships by Magura V5 boat drones.
2024	Ukrainian, English	Знищити повністю або частково / Destroy Completely or Partially	Documentary	Danylo Mokryk	Ukraine	In the film, journalist Danylo Mokryk communicates with scientists and Ukrainian victims of war crimes in order to investigate allegations of genocide of the Ukrainian people.
2024	Ukrainian	Конотопська відьма / The Witch of Konotop	Horror	Andriy Kolesnyko	Ukraine	Horror film involving an ancient witch from Konotop taking revenge on Russian invaders after they reach her city and kill her boyfriend.
2024	English	The Zelensky Story	Documentary series	Michael Waldman	Great Britain	Three-episode series following Ukrainian President Volodomyr Zelenskyy's journey from a young actor and entertainer to one of the most recognizable leaders on the planet, leading a country at war with Vladimir Putin's Russia, including access to interviews with President Zelenskyy and First Lady Olena Zelenska.
2024		Ludzie / People	Drama, War	Maciej Ślesicki Filip Hillesland	Poland	
2024		Крашанка / The Eggsplosive Easter	Comedy	Taras Dudar	Ukraine	
2024		Медовий місяць / Honeymoon	Drama, Thriller	Zhanna Ozirna	Ukraine	
2024		Донька / The Daughter	Drama, Thriller, War	Egor Olesov	Ukraine	
2024		Мобилизация / Mobilization		Vladimir Agranovich	Russia	
2024		Dwie siostry / Two Sisters	Drama	Łukasz Karwowski	Poland	
2024		Мишоловка / The Mousetrap	Drama, Thriller, War	Serhii Kastornykh	Ukraine	
2024		Deaf Lovers	Drama	Boris Guts	Estonia; Serbia	
2024		Pod wulkanem / Under the Volcano	Drama	Damian Kocur	Poland	
2024		Хазяїн 2. На своїй землі / The Host 2. On His Own Land	Drama, War	Zaza Buadze Taras Tkachenko	Ukraine	
2024		Збори ОСББ / Condominium Meetings	Comedy	Mitya Shmurak	Ukraine	
2025	English	As the Sunflower Whispers	Documentary	Samuel Felinton	United States	A feature-length documentary about untold realities of the Russo-Ukrainian War through stories from MUkraine.
2025		Свои. Баллада о войне / Ours. Ballad of War		Artem Artyomov	Russia	
2025		раша гудбай / Goodbye Russia	Comedy	Aleksey Kiryushchenko	Ukraine	
2025		Безвихідь / Hopelessness		Taras Kostanchuk	Ukraine	
2025		Алдан / Call Sign: Aldan	Drama, War	Dmitry Koltsov	Russia	
2025		Батюшка / Father		Roman Vysotsky	Russia	
2025		Війна очима тварин	Drama	Sviatoslav Kostiuk Andriy Lidahovskyi Alexei Mamedov Ivan Sautkin Yuliya Shashkova Myroslav Slaboshpytskyi Maksym Tuzov	Germany; Ukraine	

=== Upcoming films ===
Year	Language	Name	Genre	Director	Country	Synopsis
2025		10 историй о любви и смерти / 10 stories about love and death		Andrey Golovkov	Russia	
2025		Каховський об'єкт / Kakhovka facility		Oleksiy Taranenko	Ukraine	
2025		Порода / Breed		Sergey Mezentsev Alexander Balakhanov	Russia	
2025		Доброволец / Volunteer		Vyacheslav Rogozhkin	Russia	
2025		Малыш / Baby		Andrey Simonov	Russia	
2025		Общак / Common fund		Vladimir Agranovich	Russia	
2025		СВОИ / OURS		Viacheslav Kirillov	Russia	
2025		Таймер війни / War timer		Oleg Turanskyi	Ukraine	
2025		Помчали! / Let's rush off!		Vladimir Agranovich	Russia	
2025		Кіллхаус / Killhouse		Lubomir Levitski	Ukraine	
2025		Митець / Artist		Oleksiy Taranenko	Ukraine	
2026	Lithuanian, English, Russian, Ukrainian	How to Divorce During the War	Drama	Andrius Blaževičius	Lithuania; Luxembourg; Ireland; Czech Republic	
202X		Фортеця / Fortress	Drama, War	Dmitry Andriyanov	Ukraine	
202X		Лютий березень / February March		Serhiy Sotnychenko	Ukraine	
202X		Тримайся, братику / Hang in there, brother		Sergey Storozhev	Ukraine	
202X		До перемоги! / To the Victory!		Valentyn Vasyanovych	Ukraine	
202X		Охоронець / Guardian		Dmytro Laktionov	Ukraine	
202X		Служба 112 / Serwis 112			Ukraine	
202X		Nightingale	Action	William Kaufman	United States	
202X		Миссия «Ганг» / Mission "Gang"		Victor Konisevich Aditya Dhar	India; Russia	

== TV series ==
Year	Language	Name	Genre	Director	Country	Synopsis
2012-24		Жіночий лікар / Female doctor	Drama		Ukraine	
2015	Russian, Ukrainian	Не зарікайся / Don't Swear	Melodrama television show	Dmytro Goldman	Ukraine	
2015—2016	Ukrainian, Russian	Місто героїв / The City of the Heroes	Documentary series	Ivan Synepalov	Ukraine	The documentary series covers various aspects of life in front-line Mariupol in 2014-2016.
2015/2017	Ukrainian	Гвардія / The Guard	Television show	Oleksiy Shaparev	Ukraine	
2016		На лінії життя / On the Lifeline	Drama	Anton Goyda	Ukraine	
2016		Біженка / A Refugee		Victoria Melnikova	Ukraine	
2019/21/24		Розтин покаже / The autopsy will show			Ukraine	
2020		Доброволець / Volunteer	Action	Akhtem Seitablayev	Ukraine	
2021	Ukrainian, Russian	Мама / Mother	War drama, Miniseries	Taras Tkachenko, Serhiy Masloboyshchikov	Ukraine	The story of a woman from Zhytomyr who came to Donetsk in search of her son, a soldier of the Armed Forces, who was captured.
2021/23		Плут / Plut	Crime	Valeriy Ibragimov	Ukraine	
2021/22		Мама / Mother	Drama, War	Taras Tkachenko	Ukraine	
2022	Ukrainian, Russian	Mariupol Chronicles of Hell	Documentary series	Elizaveta Tatarinova	Ukraine	The film is created from documentary footage, contains monologues of the city and conversations with those who escaped from the blockaded Mariupol. Filming took place in Odesa, Kropyvnytskyi, Dnipro, Chornomorsk, and Zaporizhzhia — in those places where Mariupol residents had escaped to.
2022		Коли ми вдома. Разом до перемоги / When we are at home. Together to victory		Olena Zakharchuk	Ukraine	
2023	Ukrainian	Юрик / Yurik	Two-part TV movie, War drama	Oleksandr Tymenko	Ukraine	The story of an 11-year-old boy who, escaping from war-torn Mariupol, reaches the border of Ukraine within 15 days.
2023		Čornobiļa 2022. Iebrukums / Chernobyl 2022. Invasion	Drama	Dmytro Malkov	Latvia	
2023		Шпиталь / Hospital		Volodymyr Melnychenko	Ukraine	
2023		Ті, що залишились / Those that remained			Ukraine	
2023		Ботоферма / BotFarm	Drama	Taras Dron	Ukraine	
2023		Штурм / Assault		Zaza Buadze	Ukraine	
2023		Я — Надія / I am Hope	Drama, War	Denis Tarasov	Ukraine	
2023		Перші дні / Those Who Stayed	Comedy, Drama, War		Finland; Germany; Norway; Sweden; Ukraine	
2023		Окуповані / Occupied		Pavlo Tupik	Ukraine	
2023		Мобилизация / Mobilization	Drama	Vladimir Agranovich	Russia	
2023-24		Карлос в Україні / Carlos in Ukraine	Comedy	Nikita Torzhevsky	Ukraine	
2023-24		Волонтери / Volunteers		Andriy Burlaka	Ukraine	
2023-24		Зв’язок / Communication		Mila Pogrebyska	Ukraine	
2023-24		Голова / Head		Oleg Turansky	Ukraine	
2024	Ukrainian	Перевізниця / In Her Car	Drama	Evgeny Tunik, Arkady Nepytalyuk	Ukraine	The series covers the first days and weeks of Ukrainians during the Russian war in Ukraine. The main character is a therapist Lydia, who uses her car to transport civilians from hot spots to safer places. Each episode features a different passenger with a personal story.
2024		20/22	Action, Drama, War	Andrey Simonov	Russia	
2024		10 дней до весны / Ten days until spring	Drama, History, Mystery	Kim Druzhinin	Russia	
2024		Дільничний з ДВРЗ. Повітряна тривога / District with DVRZ. Air alarm		Taras Dudar	Ukraine	
2024		Тільки живи / Just live		Zaza Buadze	Ukraine	
2024		Позивний "Тамада" / Call sign "Tamada"		Oleksandr Salnikov	Ukraine	
2024		Друзі / Friends		Pavlo Tupik	Ukraine	
2024		Звичайна людина / Ordinary person		Dmytro Andriyanov	Ukraine	
2024		Рубан / Ruban		Dmytro Laktionov	Ukraine	
2024		Потяг / Train		Volodymyr Yanoshchuk	Ukraine	
2024		ОПГ / OPG		Serhiy Tolkushkin	Ukraine	
2024		Поклик кохання / The call of love		Aleksandr Kirienko	Ukraine	
2024		Моє кіно / My movie		Serhiy Storozhev	Ukraine	
2024		Резервисты / The Reserve	Drama	Vladimir Agranovich	Russia	
2024		Батя / Father		Dmytro Andriyanov	Ukraine	
2024		Евакуація / Evacuation		Denis Tarasov	Ukraine	
2024		Зниклі / Disappeared			Ukraine	
2024		Сімейний консультант / Family consultant		Mykola Mykhaylov	Ukraine	
2024		Мангровий гай / Mangrove grove		Serhiy Storozhev	Ukraine	
2024		Курс щасливого життя / The course of a happy life		Anna Gres	Ukraine	
2024		Подвійні ставки / Double bets		Andriy Ivanov	Ukraine	
2024		Поклик кохання / The call of love		Oleksandr Kyriyenko	Ukraine	
2024		Під одним дахом / Under one roof		Serhiy Sotnychenko	Ukraine	
2024		Продовження роду / Continuation of the family		Mykola Mykhaylov	Ukraine	
2024		Новорічна шкереберть / New Year's feast		Myron Latyk	Ukraine	
2024		Шлях до дому / The way home		Denis Tarasov	Ukraine	
2024		Сховища. Вісім історій / Repositories. Eight stories		Kyrylo Bin	Ukraine	
2024		Одна родина / One family		Maksym Mekheda	Ukraine	
2024		Прикордонники / Border guards		Oleksiy Yesakov	Ukraine	
2024		Лікарка за покликанням / A doctor by vocation		Oleksandr Kiriyenko	Ukraine	
2024		Шлях / Way		Denis Tarasov	Ukraine	
2024		Батьківський комітет / Parents' Committee		Pavlo Tupik	Ukraine	
2024		Ліки від минулого / Medicine from the past		Volodymyr Yanoshchuk	Ukraine	
2025		Ополченский романс / Militia Romance	Drama, War	Oleg Lukichyov	Russia	
2025		Кохання та полумʼя / Love and flame		Vitaly Kuksa	Ukraine	
2025		АТП Перевізники / ATP Carriers		Oleksandr Kiriyenko	Ukraine	

== Film festivals ==
According to the State Film Agency of Ukraine, the first Ukrainian national documentary film festival Cinema for Victory was held in Kyiv from February 23–25, 2024, where films shot during the Russian-Ukrainian war were presented.

== Animation ==
- During the Russian invasion of Ukraine in 2022, the 160th episode (called "Vakidzasi") of the animated series "Masyanya" was released. This episode was dedicated to the war between Russia and Ukraine, featuring real photos of the destruction in Ukraine committed by Russian troops. According to the plot, Masyanya (the main character of the cartoon series) comes to Putin and tells him that many peaceful and good people died because of the latter people. He then gives Putin a wakizashi (Japanese short sword) and tells him that this sword is for the only good decision in his life (indicating that Putin should kill himself), leading to his subsequent suicide. After the release of the cartoon, the Roskomnadzor sent the cartoon's creator Oleg Kuvaev a message about blocking the site mult.ru, which had published all the episodes of the series since 2001. Subsequently, Kuvaev released the following series: "How to explain to children" (about how to tell children about the war)", and "St. Mariuburg" (the tragedy of Mariupol, where the action is transferred to St. Petersburg, which is attacked by the forces of the People's Republic of China).
- On September 9, 2022, the animated video "Life and Death" was released on the YouTube channel "Volunteer Animation of Ukraine". The animation describes the ordinary life of an ordinary Russian soldier who came to occupy the territory of Ukraine.
