= List of war films and TV specials set between 2001 and the present =

List of war films

War depictions in film and television include documentaries, TV mini-series, and drama serials depicting aspects of historical wars. The films included here are films set in the time period from 2001 to present day, or from the moment the world woke up to a new reality one September morning at the dawn of a new century, the 9/11 attacks were followed by the war on terrorism, which has now lasted for about two decades. But it's worth noting that the early period of 21st century hasn't only seen the war on terror, but wars that have followed in the aftermath of the Arab Spring.

Note: Various wars on here are still ongoing in one form or another.

== War on terror (2001–present) ==
=== September 11 attacks (2001) ===
- 11'09"01 September 11 (2002)
- DC 9/11: Time of Crisis (2003) (TV)
- Ash Tuesday (2003)
- September (2003 film)
- Rudy: The Rudy Giuliani Story
- Yasmin (2004)
- Fahrenheit 9/11 (2004) (documentary)
- FahrenHYPE 9/11 (2004) (documentary)
- Hamburg Cell (2004) (TV)
- Homeland Security (2004)
- Tiger Cruise (2004) (TV)
- WTC View (2005)
- The Flight That Fought Back (2005)
- Into the Fire (2005)
- Flight 93 (film) (2006)
- A Few Days in September (2006)
- The 9/11 Commission Report (2006)
- The Path to 9/11 (2006) (TV)
- World Trade Center (2006)
- United 93 (2006)
- A Broken Sole (2006)
- 9/11: The Twin Towers
- Brick Lane (2007)
- Liberty Kid (2007)
- Kurbaan (2009)
- The Space Between
- Remember Me (2010 film)
- My Name Is Khan
- Extremely Loud and Incredibly Close (2012)
- Zero Dark Thirty (2012)
- Seal Team Six: The Raid on Osama Bin Laden (2012) (TV)
- The Reluctant Fundamentalist (film) (2012)
- Jack Ryan: Shadow Recruit (2014)
- 9/11 (2017)
- 12 Strong (2018)
- Vice (2018)
- The Looming Tower (2018)
- Windows on the World (2019)
- The Report (2019)
- The Mauritanian (2021)

=== War in Afghanistan (2001–2021) ===
- Kandahar (2001)
- Osama (2003)
- September Tapes (2004)
- Brødre (2004)
- Lions for Lambs (2007)
- Where in the World Is Osama Bin Laden? (2008), documentary
- Iron Man (2008)
- The Objective (2008)
- Opium War (2008)
- Red Sands (2009)
- Brothers (2009)
- Restrepo (2010) Oscar Nominee
- Armadillo (2010)
- My Name is Khan (2010)
- Essential Killing (2010)
- Dear John (2010)
- Hell and Back Again (2011) Oscar Nominee
- Afghan Luke (2011)
- Our War (2016)
- Forces spéciales (2011)
- Zero Dark Thirty (2012)
- The Patrol (2013)
- Vishwaroopam (2013)
- Lone Survivor (2013)
- Korengal (2014)
- Kajaki (2014)
- Inbetween Worlds (2014)
- Hyena Road (2015)
- Krigen (2015)
- The Wakhan Front (2015)
- Sniper Special Ops (2016)
- War Machine (2017)
- 12 Strong (2018)
- The Kill Team (2019)
- The Outpost (2020)
- Retrograde (2022), documentary
- Guy Ritchie's The Covenant (2023)
- Warhorse One (2023)
- Hollywoodgate (2023), documentary
- 13 Days, 13 Nights (2025)

=== Iraq War (2003–2011) ===
- Saving Jessica Lynch (2003) (TV)
- Gunner Palace (2004), documentary
- The Dreams of Sparrows (2005), documentary
- Occupation: Dreamland (2005), documentary
- Over There (2005) (TV series)
- The Tiger and the Snow (2005)
- American Soldiers (2005)
- Baghdad ER (2006), documentary
- Djihad (2006) (TV)
- Dreams (2006)
- Home of the Brave (2006)
- Iraq in Fragments (2006)
- My Country, My Country (2006)
- The Situation (2006)
- Valley of the Wolves Iraq (2006)
- The War Tapes (2006), documentary
- In the Valley of Elah (2007)
- Body of War (2007), documentary
- No End In Sight (2007), documentary
- Redacted (2007)
- Grace Is Gone (2007)
- The Mark of Cain (2007) (TV)
- Battle For Haditha (2007)
- Stop Loss (2008)
- W. (2008)
- House of Saddam (2008) (miniseries)
- Generation Kill (2008) (miniseries)
- Body of Lies (2008)
- 10 Days to War (2008)
- Standard Operating Procedure (2008), documentary
- Brothers at War (2009), documentary
- Taking Chance (2009) (TV)
- The Hurt Locker (2009)
- The Messenger (2009)
- The Road to Fallujah (2009), documentary
- The Triangle of Death (2009), documentary
- Occupation (2009)
- Baker Boys: Inside the Surge (2010) (miniseries)
- Fair Game (2010)
- Farewell Baghdad (2010)
- Green Zone (2010)
- Shadows in Paradise (2010)
- Son of Babylon (2010)
- Homeland (2011)
- Memorial Day (2012)
- Allegiance (2012)
- Boys of Abu Ghraib (2014)
- American Sniper (2014)
- War Dogs (2016)
- Billy Lynn's Long Halftime Walk (film)(2016)
- Sand Castle (2017)
- The Wall (2017)
- The Long Road Home (2017)
- The Yellow Birds (2017)
- Thank You for Your Service (2017)
- Indivisible (2018)
- Once Upon a Time in Iraq (2020), BBC documentary
- Cherry (2021)
- Warfare (2025)

=== Covert special operations ===
- The Unit (2006–2009) (TV series)
- Body of Lies (2008)
- Fair Game (2010)
- Forces spéciales (2011)
- Soldiers of Fortune (2012)
- Seal Team Six: The Raid on Osama Bin Laden (2012) (TV)
- Vishwaroopam (2013)
- Good Kill (2014)
- Eye in the Sky (2015)
- Mine (2016)
- Snowden (2016)
- SEAL Team (2017–2024) (TV series)

=== Insurgency in Saudi Arabia (2003–present) ===
- Syriana (2005)
- The Kingdom (2007)

=== Insurgency in the Maghreb (2002–present) ===
- Rendition (2007)

=== Joint Chiefs of Staff operations ===
- E-Ring (2005–2006) (TV series)

=== Operation Enduring Freedom – Horn of Africa (2002–2016) ===
- Captain Phillips (2013)

=== Operation Enduring Freedom – Philippines (2002–2017) ===
- Operation Balikatan (2003)
- The Hunt for Eagle One (2006)
- The Hunt for Eagle One: Crash Point (2006)
- Act of Valor (2012)
- Whiskey Tango Foxtrot (2016)
- Plane (2023)

=== Terrorist Sleeper cells ===
- The Siege (1998)
- Traitor (2008)
- Vantage Point (2008)
- Four Lions (2010)
- Patriots Day (2016)
- Hotel Mumbai (2018)

=== War on Terror in Pakistan ===
- A Mighty Heart (2007)
- Forces spéciales (2011)
- Seal Team Six: The Raid on Osama Bin Laden (2012) (TV)
- Zero Dark Thirty (2012)
- Waar (2013)
- Phantom (2015)

== Modern wars in sub-Saharan Africa (2003–2020) ==
=== War in Darfur (2003–2020) ===
- The Devil Came on Horseback (2007)
- Google Darfur (2007), documentary
- On Our Watch (2007), documentary
- Darfur (2009)

=== Central African Republic Bush War (2004–2007) ===
- The Ambassador (2011), documentary

=== Kivu conflict (2004–2009) ===
- Sniper: Reloaded (2011)
- War Witch (2012)

=== Chadian Civil War (2005–2010) ===
- Daratt (2006)
- A Screaming Man (2010)

=== Tuareg rebellion (2012) ===
- Timbuktu (2014)

== Unrest in Kosovo (2004) ==
- Kosovo: Can You Imagine? (2009), documentary
- Enclave (2015)

== Mexican drug war (2006–present) ==
- Breaking Bad (TV series) (2008–2013)
- El Sicario, Room 164 (2010)
- Miss Bala (2011)
- Savages (2012)
- Snitch (2012)
- End of Watch (2012)
- The Last Stand (2013)
- 600 Miles (2015)
- Cartel Land (2015), documentary
- Metástasis (TV series) (2015)
- Sicario (2015)
- Sicario: Day of the Soldado (2018)
- Narcos: Mexico (2018–2021)
- Rambo: Last Blood (2019 Film)

== South Ossetia War (2008) ==
- Olympus Inferno (2008)
- 5 Days of War (2011)
- August Eighth (2012)
- Shindisi (2019)

== Libyan Civil War (2011) ==
- War Story (2014)
- A Private War (2018)

== Factional violence in Libya (2011–2014) ==
- 13 Hours: The Secret Soldiers of Benghazi (2016)

== Syrian Civil War (2011–present) ==
- Ladder to Damascus (2013)
- Return to Homs (2013), documentary
- Sniper: Legacy (2014)
- Phantom (2015)
- The Father (2016)
- Last Men in Aleppo (2017), documentary
- A Private War (2018)
- Girls of the Sun (2018)
- Palmira (film) (2022)

== Iraqi Civil War (2014–2017) ==
- Mosul (2019)
- Once Upon a Time in Iraq (2020)

== Russo-Ukrainian War (2014–present) ==
=== Annexation of Crimea by the Russian Federation (2014) ===
- Cherkasy (2020)

=== War in Donbas (2014–2022) ===
- Cyborgs: Heroes Never Die (2017)
- Frost (2017)
- Donbass (2018)
- Bad Roads (2020)
- Hotsunlight (2021)
- God Will Forgive (2021) (short film)
- Klondike (2022)
- Sniper. The White Raven (2022)

=== Russian invasion of Ukraine (2022–present) ===
- Panorama: Putin's War in Ukraine (2022), documentary
- Best in Hell (2022)
- Superpower (2023), documentary
- Russians at War (2024), documentary
- As the Sunflower Whispers (2025), documentary

== Yemeni Civil War (2014–present) ==
- Operation Red Sea (2018)
- Al Kameen(The Ambush) (2021)

== Nagorno-Karabakh conflict (2016) ==
- Gate to Heaven (2019)

== Battle of Marawi (2017) ==
- Maalaala Mo Kaya: Bandila (2017),
- Maalaala Mo Kaya: Tangke (2018)

== See also ==
List of war films and TV specials
