= Maksym Kryvtsov =

Ukrainian poet, soldier (1990–2024)

- Максим Кривцов
- Kryvtsov in 2020
- Born: Maksym Oleksandrovych Kryvtsov; 23 January 1990; Rivne, Ukrainian SSR, Soviet Union
- Died: 7 January 2024 (aged 33)
- Other names: Dali (Далі)
- Occupations: Poet, soldier
- Awards: Order of the Gold Star Order of Merit

Maksym Oleksandrovych Kryvtsov (Ukrainian: Максим Олександрович Кривцов; 22 January 1990 – 7 January 2024) was a Ukrainian poet, photographer, public figure, volunteer and soldier. He was a Junior sergeant of the Armed Forces of Ukraine, and participant in the Russian-Ukrainian war. Hero of Ukraine (2025, posthumously).

== Biography ==
Maksym Oleksandrovych Kryvtsov was born in Rivne on 22 January 1990. His father was a press salesman, and his mother was a school librarian. He studied at schools #23 and #28 in Rivne. He graduated from the Technical School of Technology and Design in Rivne with a degree in Production of Nonwoven Textile Materials.

In 2014, Kryvtsov graduated from the Kyiv National University of Technologies and Design, where he studied footwear and leather goods design. He worked at the Rivne Factory of Nonwovens, as a sales assistant, assistant atelier master, and SMM manager of the Strokati yenoty project.

Kryvtsov was a participant of the Revolution of Dignity. From 2014, he was a volunteer at the frontlines, and was a member of the ATO/JFO. He participated in combat operations as part of the 5th Battalion of the Right Sector (2014–2015), and later as a senior machine gunner in the Rapid Response Brigade of the National Guard of Ukraine (2016–2019). After demobilization, he worked as a content manager at the YARMIZ Center for Rehabilitation and Rehabilitation of ATO and JFO Participants, and was a copywriter at Veteran Hub.

With the beginning of the full-scale Russian invasion of Ukraine, Kryvtsov rejoined the Armed Forces of Ukraine. On 7 January 2024, his red cat, to whom he had dedicated the poem below, died along with him. On 11 January, a farewell service was held at St. Michael's Golden-Domed Cathedral, and then on Maidan Nezalezhnosti in Kyiv. He was buried on 12 January in his hometown on the Alley of Heroes at the Nove Cemetery.

== Poetry ==
Kryvtsov wrote poetry since he was a teenager. He was published in collections with works by other authors—"The Book of Love 2.0. Love and War", "Where I am at Home: 112 Poems about Love and War", and "Lullaby of the 21st Century Vol. 1: What Lulls You to Sleep?". Songs based on his poetry have been performed by the Ukrainian band Yurcash —"Dominant Height", "He is in the Armed Forces, She is in the TRO", and "Yellow Scotch". He was fond of photography.

The song 'Yellow Scotch' based on a poem by Maksym Kryvtsov performed by the band 'Yurkesh' sounds in the movie 'Our Kitties'.

In 2023, Kryvtsov published a collection of poetry Virshi z biinytsi, which was recognized as one of the best Ukrainian books of 2023 by PEN Ukraine.

== Awards ==
- Title of Hero of Ukraine with the award of the Order of the Golden Star (22 August 2025, posthumously)
- Order of Merit, 3rd class (22 January 2024, posthumously)
