= The Star (2002 film) =

2002 film by Nikolai Lebedev

- Official English language poster
- Directed by: Nikolai Lebedev
- Written by: Yevgeny Grigoriev; Nikolai Lebedev; Alexander Borodyansky
- Produced by: Karen Shakhnazarov
- Starring: Igor Petrenko; Artyom Semakin; Aleksei Panin; Aleksei Kravchenko
- Music by: Alexey Rybnikov
- Distributed by: Mosfilm
- Release date: 6 May 2002 (Russia)
- Running time: 97 minutes
- Country: Russia
- Language: Russian

The Star (Russian: Звезда, translit. Zvezda) is a 2002 Russian film directed by Nikolai Lebedev, a large modern project of Mosfilm. It is based on a short story of the same name by Emmanuil Kazakevich, about a group of Soviet scouts working behind enemy lines during Operation Bagration in World War II. The story had previously been made into a 1953 film of the same name.

Aleksei Kravchenko won a government award for his role in this film.

== Plot ==
A team of Soviet scouts is sent behind enemy lines to find the location of the German armor forces. The Soviets wait until night, and open up with an artillery barrage. As the guns fire, the team advances. The team successfully slips behind enemy lines. Many dramatic scenes follow. In one, a German soldier is captured and interrogated. In another, the team calls an airstrike on German positions, causing great damage and casualties. One man even kills a German soldier with his pistol during the air attack. This tract of scenes finds the main characters successfully finding the location of the German armor. They are eventually cornered in a barn, with Germans attacking on all sides. During the battle, the team leader sends a radio message, telling the location of enemy armor. The team is eventually overrun and wiped out.

== Cast ==
- Igor Petrenko as Lt. Travkin
- Artyom Semakin as Pvt. Vorobiev
- Aleksei Panin as Sgt. Mamochkin
- Aleksei Kravchenko as Sgt. Anikanov
- Anatoly Gushchin as Pvt. Bykov
- Amadu Mamadakov as Pvt. Temdekov
- Yuri Laguta as Sgt. Brazhnikov
- Yekaterina Vulichenko as Pvt. Katya Simakova
- Andrei Yegorov as Capt. Barashkin
- Alexander Dyachenko as Ltc. Galiyev
- Timofey Tribuntsev as episode
- Aleksandr Ustyugov as episode (uncredited)

== Reception ==
Eddie Cockrell of Variety called it "an ordnance-packed war epic" and said that it was well made and might appeal to international audiences but that "Westerners have seen this formula before in Spielberg’s opus".
