= Ilovaisk 2014. Battalion Donbas =

Ilovaisk 2014. Battalion "Donbas"
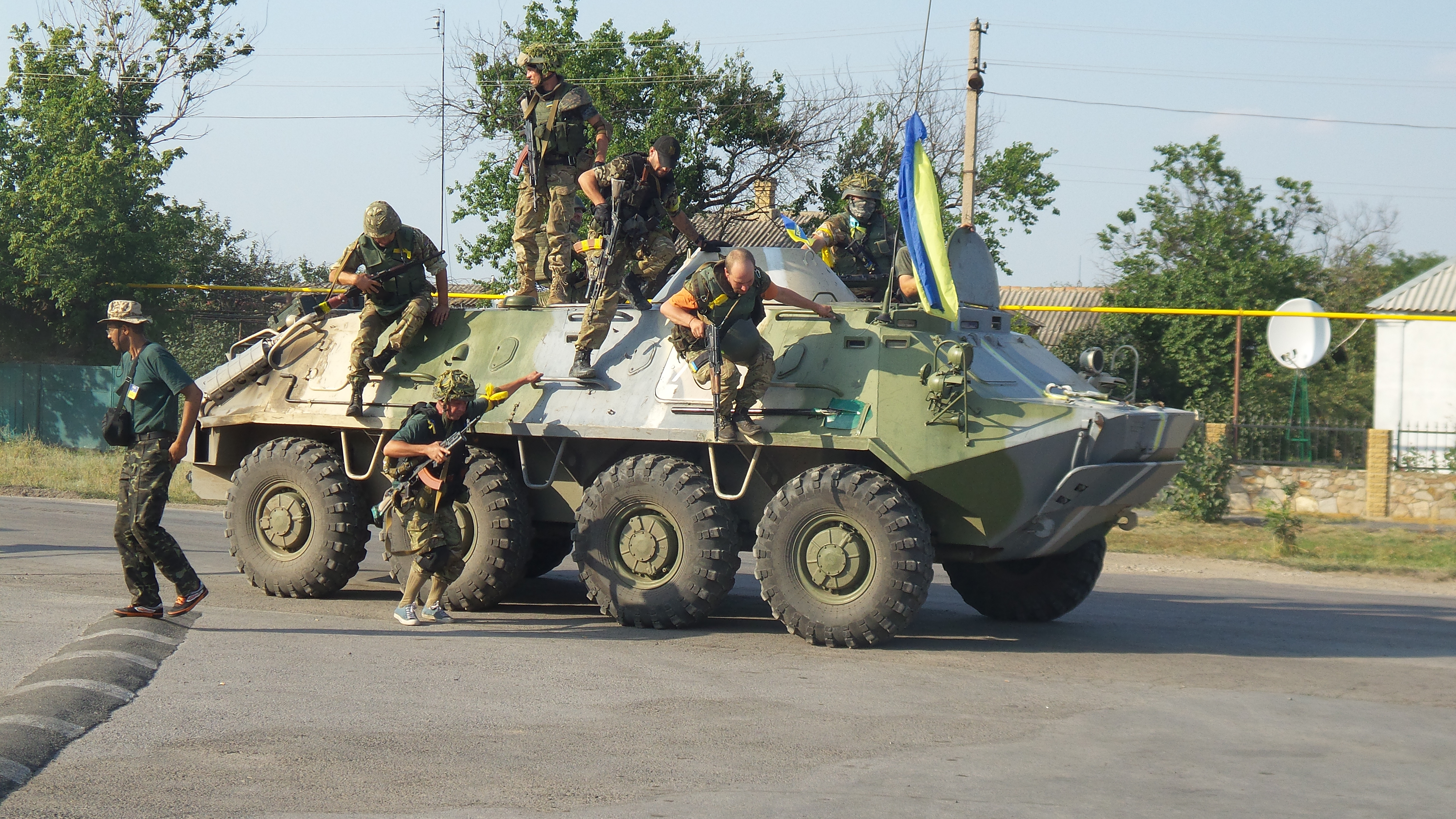
- Donbas Battalion fighters in Donetsk Oblast, 2014
- Іловайськ 2014. Батальйон Донбас
- Directed by: Ivan Tymchenko
- Screenplay by: Mykhailo Brynykh; Dmytro Tuzov; Taras Kostanchuk
- Starring: Taras Kostanchuk; Anastasia Renard; Ruslan Sokolnik; Serhii Dzialyk; Oleh Drach; Oleksandr Mavrits
- Release date: August 29, 2019 (Ukraine)
- Running time: approx. 120 min.
- Country: Ukraine
- Languages: Ukrainian, Russian
- Budget: ₴33 million (approx. €1.1 million)

Ilovaisk 2014. Battalion "Donbas" (Ukrainian: «Іловайськ 2014. Батальйон Донбас»; working titles: Ilovaisk Story and Ilovaisk 2014) is a 2019 Ukrainian feature film directed by Ivan Tymchenko about the Battle of Ilovaisk during the War in Donbas. The film was released in wide Ukrainian theatrical distribution on 29 August 2019. It was produced entirely from private funds, with no support from the State Film Agency of Ukraine, the Ministry of Culture, or the Ukrainian Cultural Foundation.

== Synopsis ==
July 2014. War is underway in eastern Ukraine. The volunteer Donbas Battalion liberates the town of Popasna from separatist fighters. Meanwhile, Oleksii, the son of a former GRU colonel from Rostov named Valerii Runkov, enlists as a mercenary fighter. The battalion, together with units of the Armed Forces of Ukraine, liberates Kurakhoye in early August and approaches Ilovaisk.

The assault group commander "Bishut" takes Oleksii prisoner during the storming of a fortified position. On 10 August the battalion comes under attack and one of its fighters, "Samolyot", is killed. Runkov, concerned for his son, travels to Donetsk to visit a colleague, Dmytro, who recruits Russians for the war. Dmytro offers Runkov the post of commandant of Ilovaisk. Learning that Oleksii is in captivity, Runkov accepts the position.

On 19 August street fighting erupts in Ilovaisk, ending in defeat for the Ukrainian side. Experienced fighters "Shultz", "Skif" and "Franco" are killed. Ukrainian forces begin to withdraw. Bishut and his soldier Yevhen "Kventin" are wounded and fall behind, hiding in the apartment of an elderly local woman, Nadiia Petrivna. A young neighbour, Svitlana — a secretary at the commandant's office who wants to leave the city but cannot because of her nearly paralysed father — discovers them.

On 29 August Ukrainian forces attempt to leave the encirclement via a "green corridor" following what is described as a "request to the separatists" from Putin. The column comes under fire from Russian tanks and artillery near Chervonosilske; the great majority of Ukrainian soldiers are killed. The prisoners, including Oleksii, also perish. Bishut and Kventin, aided by a local mechanic, obtain forged documents and attempt to cross the front line on a civilian bus. Runkov intercepts the bus; however, a local teacher named Yakiv secretly passes Bishut a pistol, enabling Bishut to take Runkov hostage and break free. Bishut releases Runkov and the bus proceeds to Ukrainian-controlled territory. The film ends with photographs of Donbas Battalion fighters who took part in the battle and were killed there or died later.

== Cast ==
Actor	Role
Taras Kostanchuk	"Bishut" (playing himself — real commander of the assault group)
Anastasia Renard	Svitlana
Ruslan Sokolnik	"Kventin"
Serhii Dzialyk	Runkov
Oleh Drach	"Skif" (Oleksandr Romanenko)
Oleksandr Mavrits	"Shultz" (Serhii Shkarivskyi)
Iistan Rozumnyi	"Franco" (Marko Paslawsky)
Fedir Rykov	"Nostradamus"
Yevhen Lamakh	"Samalyot" (Vadym Antonov)
Serhii Detiuk	Teacher (Yakiv)
Serhii Solopai	"Usach" (Yevhenii Telnov)
Hennadii Vasylenko	"Uman"
Mariia Karpenko	"Alona"

== Production ==
The screenplay was written by journalist and author Mykhailo Brynykh, who spent more than two years developing it from press materials and first-hand accounts of veterans who took part in the liberation operation at Ilovaisk. Principal photography took place in 2018 outside Kyiv.

The film's lead actor, Taras Kostanchuk, plays himself — he is the real Donbas Battalion commander nicknamed "Bishut" who led the assault group during the actual events depicted in the film. Hundreds of other veterans of the Donbas Battalion and the Armed Forces of Ukraine participated as actors and extras. The total production budget was ₴33 million (approximately €1.1 million), financed exclusively from private sources, with no grants from the State Film Agency of Ukraine, the Ministry of Culture, or the Ukrainian Cultural Foundation.

The character of "Franco" is based on real-life Ukrainian-American volunteer Marko Paslawsky, who was killed in the battle. On 14 May 2019 the first trailer was released. The film had its wide Ukrainian theatrical release on 29 August 2019 — the fifth anniversary of the Ilovaisk encirclement. On 4 February 2020 the film was made freely available on a VOD platform.

== Festival and special screenings ==
Outside its domestic theatrical release, Ilovaisk 2014. Battalion "Donbas" was included in several international showcase programmes of contemporary Ukrainian cinema. In November 2019 the film was screened in Prague as part of the "Week of Ukrainian Film" festival organised by the Ukrainian Embassy in the Czech Republic, alongside Valentyn Vasyanovych's Atlantis and Nariman Aliev's Homeward.

In July 2020 the film was also shown in Kraków within a Ukrainian film series hosted by the Ukraina Foundation and the "Kinokawiarnia Kika" cinema, which presented it under the title Ilowajsk 2014. Batalion „Donbas” for a Polish audience.

== Critical reception ==
The film received mixed reviews from Ukrainian film critics. Writing for Espreso TV, critic Liena Chycherina identified the film's main weakness as its "serialness", comparing it to a "typical Russian-language television serial of Russian/Ukrainian production" and noting that it was distinguished from such serials only by its partial use of the Ukrainian language, with many characters still speaking Russian.

By contrast, Valerii Myrnyi, writing for NV, took the diametrically opposite view, stating that "unlike many other Ukrainian films, Ilovaisk 2014. Battalion Donbas does not bear the hallmark of a cheap television serial smelling of mothballs". Critics who evaluated the film positively highlighted its departure from the template of Ukrainian theatrical cinema, the filmmakers' ability to rise above convenient commercial conventions, and their evident effort to correct the mistakes of earlier Ukrainian war films about the Russo-Ukrainian War, by producing what they described as an artistic monument to the soldiers who died in the Ilovaisk cauldron and in the wider war in Donbas.

== Television and streaming ==
On 27 August 2020 the film had its free-to-air television premiere on the channel 1+1, timed to the anniversary of the Ilovaisk battle. In September 2020 it became legally available online via a Ukrainian VOD platform, where it was released for free viewing.

== See also ==
- Battle of Ilovaisk
- Donbas Battalion
- War in Donbas
- Cinema of Ukraine
- Cyborg (film)
