= Stanislav Tiunov =

Ukrainian film and music producer

- Станіслав Тіунов
- Born: Kharkiv, Ukrainian SSR, Soviet Union
- Citizenship: Ukraine
- Occupations: Film producer; film director; music producer
- Years active: 2003–present
- Known for: Bucha (2023); Firework Sound (label)

Stanislav Tiunov (Ukrainian: Станіслав Тіунов) is a Ukrainian film producer, music producer, director, and show-business figure. He gained recognition in the Ukrainian and international media space as the head of the Firework Sound label, whose roster has included the bands Kazaky and The Hardkiss.

== Biography ==
=== Education and early career ===
Stanislav Tiunov was born in Kharkiv. He studied and worked in Cincinnati, Ohio, United States. He graduated from the Institute of Oriental Studies and International Relations "Kharkiv Collegium" with a degree in International Economic Relations. While at the institute he studied Japanese and Indonesian. He is also fluent in English and French.

He began his professional career in 2003 at the company "Kinomedia", which handled advertising in Ukrainian cinemas. In 2005 he founded his own agency, "Imagim Media", which oversaw the construction of the "Sputnik" cinema and dealt with the sale of advertising in cinemas.

His next venture was the company IMA Group, focused on event organization and advertising in nightclubs. The company organized events featuring Solange Knowles, Sylvester Stallone, Jessie Ware, Dolph Lundgren, Jason Statham, and other international stars.

=== Music production ===
In 2010, Tiunov became one of the founders and managing partner of the record label Firework Sound. The label's debut project was the band Kazaky. In 2011, the label began collaborating with the newly formed band The Hardkiss; on Tiunov's recommendation, the band began performing in English and pursuing the Western music market.

Beginning in 2012, he worked with singer Alloise on her solo career. Their first joint result was Alloise being named Best Ukrainian Act at the 2012 MTV Europe Music Awards.

In addition to producing, Tiunov directed music videos for Alloise and the boy band Lucky4. He also worked as a songwriter and was the organizer of singer Sergey Lazarev's Ukrainian tour "Lazarev".

=== Television and beauty pageants ===
Tiunov served as producer of the national contest Miss Ukraine from 2015 to 2019. During those years the contest reached the highest positions among the country's TV shows.

=== Film career ===
On 14 February 2019, the comedy film Producer (Продюсер) was released in Ukrainian theatres, with Tiunov as one of the producers. In 2019 he also became a creative producer at the production company Go Production.

He served as the lead producer of the romantic comedy Date in Vegas (Побачення у Вегасі), released in wide theatrical distribution on 5 March 2020. Tiunov was also the producer, director, and screenwriter of the television series Youth (Молодість) in 2020.

==== Bucha (2023) ====
In 2022, preparations began for the production of the film Bucha. Tiunov directed the film, which was shot in February–March 2023 in Kyiv and Kyiv Oblast. Bucha was the first narrative feature film shot in Ukraine since the start of the full-scale Russian invasion.

The film is based on real events and tells the story of Konstantin Gudauskas, a Lithuanian Jew and citizen of Kazakhstan who, using his Kazakh passport, travelled into Russian-occupied territory and helped evacuate more than 200 Ukrainian civilians from Bucha and other occupied towns during the spring of 2022. The Polish actor Cezary Łukaszewicz and Ukrainian actor Viacheslav Dovzhenko played the leading roles.

The film had its world premiere at the Warsaw Film Festival before its theatrical release in Ukraine. The Ministry of Defence of Ukraine, the General Staff of the Armed Forces of Ukraine, the State Border Guard Service of Ukraine, the National Police of Ukraine, the Kyiv City Council, the Kyiv Regional Military Administration, and Film.UA Group assisted in production and acted as co-producers.

== Filmography ==
Year	Title	Role
2019	Producer (Продюсер)	Producer
2020	Date in Vegas (Побачення у Вегасі)	Producer
2020	Youth (Молодість, TV series)	Producer, director, screenwriter
2023	Bucha	Director
