= Aleksey Nagin =

Russian army officer (1981–2022)

- Алексей Юрьевич Нагин
- Born: Aleksey Yuryevich Nagin; 21 March 1981; Vertyachy, Volgograd Oblast, Soviet Union
- Died: 20 September 2022 (aged 41); Bakhmut, Donetsk Oblast, Ukraine
- Burial place: Volgograd, Russia
- Military career
- Allegiance: Russia
- Branch: Russian Ground Forces
- Service years: 2008–2022
- Unit: Wagner Group
- Conflicts: Russo-Georgian War; Syrian Civil War; Second Libyan Civil War; Russo-Ukrainian War; Russian invasion of Ukraine; Battle of Bakhmut †
- Awards: Hero of the Russian Federation; Hero of the Donetsk People's Republic

Aleksey Yuryevich Nagin (Russian: Алексей Юрьевич Нагин; 21 March 1981 – 20 September 2022) was a Russian army officer. He was the commander of one of the assault detachments of the Wagner Group. He was awarded the title Hero of the Russian Federation posthumously when he was killed in action in the Battle of Bakhmut, as well as the Hero of the Donetsk People's Republic, and the Luhansk People's Republic.

== Biography ==
Aleksey Nagin was born on 21 March 1981 in Vertyachy in the Gorodishchensky district of the Volgograd Oblast, to his father, Yury Viktorovich, who is a former military man, and Galina Andreevna Zayler-Ivanova.

As a child, he did karate. After graduating from high school, he studied at a technical school.

Nagin was drafted into the Armed Forces of Russia, and was a participant in the hostilities in Chechnya. After completing his military service, he signed a contract.

Nagin was part of the fighting in the Russo-Georgian War. Then he moved to the FSB special forces in Volgograd as a reconnaissance sniper. From 2014 to 2016, he was an instructor for training scouts in Crimea. In the end, Nagin quit the FSB and joined the Wagner Group. He was participating in the Syrian civil war, as he spent 3 years there, and the Second Libyan Civil War.

In 2022, Nagin participated in the Russian invasion of Ukraine. On 12 May he was seriously wounded. After a long treatment in August he returned to the service. On 20 September 2022, Nagin was killed in action in the Battle of Bakhmut. He was buried in Volgograd at the Dimitrievsky cemetery.

== Personal life ==
He was not married. In battles, he was repeatedly wounded and shell-shocked. He was co-author of the films "Sunshine" and "Best in Hell".
