= The Eggsplosive Easter =

2024 Ukrainian family comedy film

- Directed by: Taras Dudar
- Written by: Dmitriy Grigorenko, Yuri Mikulenko
- Produced by: Marina Kvasova, Alla Lipovetskaia, Sergey Sozanovsky, Volodymyr Borodyansky, Oleksandr Bogutskiy
- Starring: Stanislav Boklan, Olesia Zhurakivska, Daria Leheida, Mikhailo Pulianskyi, Volodymyr Hladkyi
- Cinematography: Serhii Krutko
- Edited by: Mikael Torgomyan
- Production company: Mamas Film Production
- Release date: 25 April 2024
- Country: Ukraine
- Language: Ukrainian
- Box office: $45,963

The Eggsplosive Easter (Ukrainian: Крашанка, romanized: Krashanka, lit. 'Easter egg') is a 2024 Ukrainian family comedy film. Directed by Taras Dudar, the film stars Stanislav Boklan, Olesia Zhurakivska, Daria Leheida and Volodymyr Hladki, among others. The film received a theatrical release in Ukraine on 25 April, 2024. The film was also screened at the Intro film festival in Lviv, a festival dedicated to films about music and culture, in early April 2024.

The film was one of the few feature films entirely created after the 2022 invasion of Russia into Ukraine.

== Plot ==
The movie revolves around the Zabiyaka family, one of many families affected by the war. Ivan Zabiyaka is an honoured Ukrainian railroad worker, living out his retirement in his native village in the Kharkiv region. His two sons and daughter are gathered at their parents' house for Easter. But since the beginning of the war, his behavior has become strange, according to his neighbours, often spending his time in his workshop. It is later revealed that Ivan is working on a rocket to hit the enemy capital, Moscow.

== Filming ==
Filming took place in Kyiv and surrounding areas. Notably, the creators had to complete filming in 10 days, as the film required green trees in the background due to its setting in spring.

== Cast ==
- Stanislav Boklan - Ivan Zabiyaka
- Olesia Zhurakivska - Eldest Daughter
- Daria Leheida - Youngest Daughter
- Volodymyr Hladkyi - Son
- Mikhailo Pulianskyi - Grandson
- Artur Lohai
- Kira Meshcherska
- Liudmyla Zahorska
- Ihor Portianko
- Yevhen Sinchukov
- Galina Korneeva
- Mykhailo Kryshtal
- Sergey Zhuravlev
- Natalia Kobizka
- Nikita Balev

== See also ==
- List of films about the Russo-Ukrainian war
