= Aleksei Kravchenko (actor) =

Russian actor (born 1969)

- Born: Aleksei Yevgenyevich Kravchenko; 10 October 1969 (age 56); Moscow, RSFSR, Soviet Union
- Occupation: Actor
- Years active: 1985, 1995–present
- Spouse(s): Alisa Kravchenko (divorced); Nadezhda Borisova
- Children: 3

Aleksei Yevgenyevich Kravchenko (Russian: Алексе́й Евге́ньевич Кра́вченко; born 10 October 1969) is a Russian actor known for his role in the 1985 film Come and See as a young boy in the resistance army.

== Biography ==
Kravchenko was born in Moscow, Russian SFSR, Soviet Union. In 1985, aged 15, he made his debut in the film Come and See directed by Elem Klimov. He was 14 when filming started. After graduating from vocational school, he served in the Navy.

He attended the Boris Shchukin Theatre Institute, starting in 1991 and graduating in 1995. He was taught by actress Alla Kazanskaya.

He did not act in anything for more than a decade, but since 1998, he has appeared in at least one film or TV show almost every year. He was awarded the Merited Artist of the Russian Federation in 2007.

In 2020, he was awarded the People's Artist of Russia.

In 2023, the Ministry of Culture and Information Policy of Ukraine added Aleksei Kravchenko to the list of persons posing a threat to the national security of Ukraine due to his involvement in the 2021 war film Solntsepyok, which depicts the war in Eastern Ukraine and portrays PMC Wagner mercenaries as positive characters. Filming took place in annexed Crimea.

== Filmography ==
Year	Title	Role	Notes
1985	Come and See	Flyora (Florian) Gaishun	
2000	The Christmas Miracle	Maxim	
2002	Brigada	Vvedensky	TV series
2002	The Star	Sergeant Anikanov	
2002	Spetsnaz	Captain 'Doc' Vladimir Vyazemsky	TV miniseries
2003	Spetsnaz 2	Captain 'Doc' Vladimir Vyazemsky	TV miniseries
2005	The 9th Company	Captain Bystrov	
2005	The Fall of the Empire	Captain Rysin	TV series
2006	Yeralash	Issue number 198 (Fell, squeeze!)	
2007	Attack on Leningrad		TV series
2009	Bros	Makar Krylov	TV series
2009	High Security Vacation	Sergei Gagarin	
2010	Iron Lord	Harald	
2010	Bros – 2	Makar Krylov	TV series
2011	Brothers	Konstantin Starostin, Major MUR	TV series
2011	Steep banks	Andrey Belyaev	TV series
2012	Bros – 3	Makar Krylov	TV series
2013	Pyotr Leschenko. Everything That Was...	Sergey Nikolayevich Burenin	TV miniseries
2013	Bros – 4	Makar Krylov	TV series
2013	Double blues	Igor Krutitsky	TV miniseries
2014	Men's holidays	Yuriy Popov	TV series
2014	I'm not afraid anymore	Igor Koltsov	TV series
2016	Santa Claus. Battle of the Magi	evil wizard Karachun	
2017	Ancestral Land	Makar Morozov	TV series
2019	The Painted Bird	Gavrila	
2019	Lev Yashin. The Goalee of My Dreams	Alexei Khomich	
2021	Hotsunlight	Pavel Gritsay	
2022	Best in Hell	Shopot	
2022	The Telki	Boris Borisovich	TV series
2025	Rowing for Gold	Colonel Levitin	

== Awards ==
- 2003 – State Prize of the Russian Federation in the area of literature and art – for his role in the film The Star.
- 20 August 2007 – Merited Artist of the Russian Federation – for merit in the arts
- 30 March 2020 – People's Artist of Russia – for great merit in the arts
- 18 May 2022 – Medal of the Order "For Merit to the Fatherland", 2nd class – for great contribution to the development of national culture and active civil position
