= MUkraine =

Russo-Ukrainian War podcast

- Genre: Russo-Ukrainian War
- Format: Weekly
- Country of origin: US
- Language: English, Ukrainian, Russian

Creative team
- Developed by: Larry Sheret

Cast and voices
- Hosted by: Victor Fet, Stefan Schoeberlein, Kateryna Schray, Anara Tabyshalieva

Production
- Production: Marshall University

Publication
- No. of episodes: 150
- Original release: March 2, 2022
- License: Public domain

Related
- Website: Official website

MUkraine is a weekly podcast, hosted by Marshall University, held to give Ukrainian refugees, frontline workers, and soldiers a platform to speak about the Russo-Ukrainian War.

== Format ==
MUkraine has been hosted every week since March 2, 2022 within a panelist Q&A format. The podcast has hosted over 120 guests that include university professors, philanthropists, charity organizations and Ukrainian refugees, volunteers and soldiers.

=== Hosts ===
The main hosts of the podcast include;

- Victor Fet, a longtime Marshall biology professor who is a native of the Ukraine and grew up in Russia.
- Anara Tabyshalieva is an associate professor of history with expertise in war and peacebuilding in the Russian, Eurasian, and Asian regions. She was born in the Soviet Union and has worked in Russia.
- Stefan Schoeberlein, an assistant professor of English and a native of Germany, will join the panel and provide perspectives on the European Union's reaction.
- Kateryna Schray, a faculty administrator and professor of English, whose family is from Ukraine and has taught at the university level in that country. Schray's father dedicated his life to advocating for human rights and religious freedom for Ukraine while it was under Soviet control, and his work became the family's mission, the news release said.

== Popular culture ==
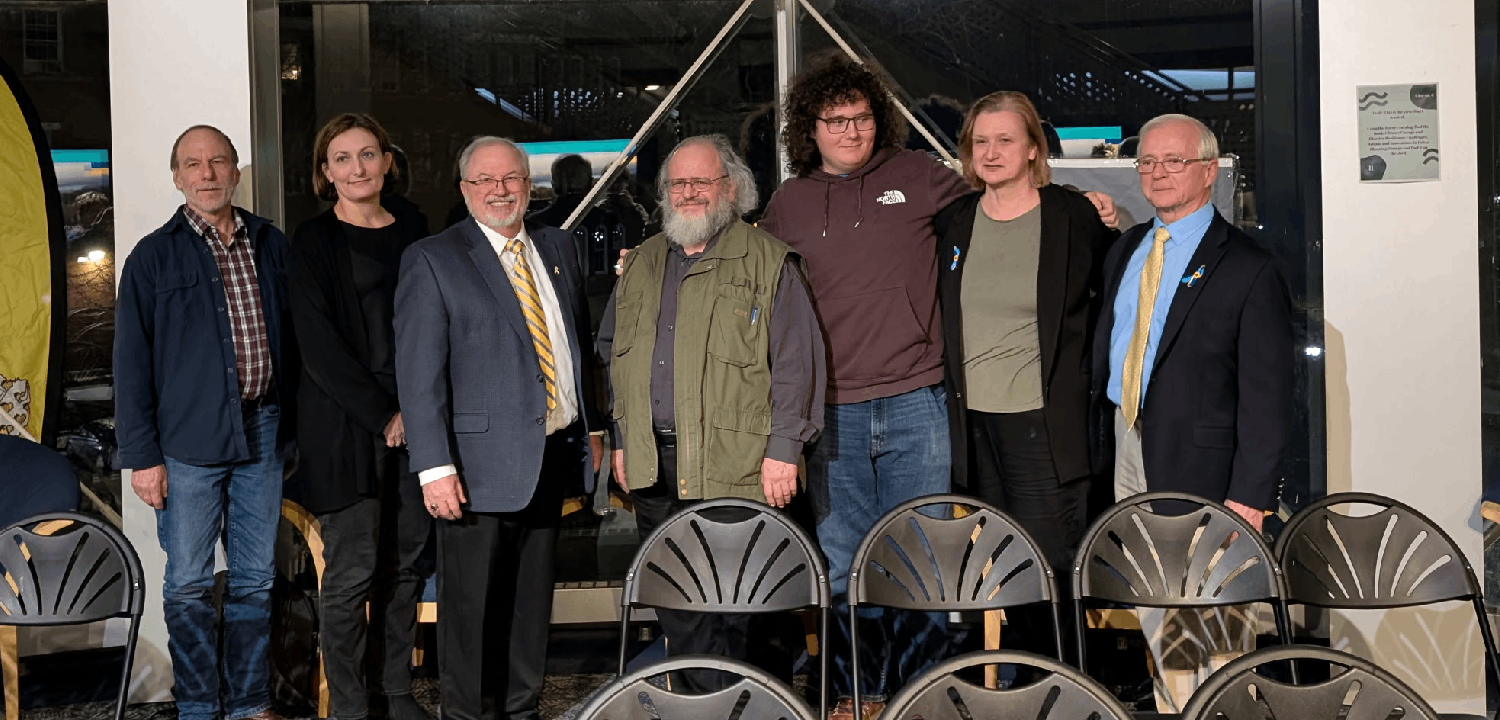
Samuel Felinton and MUkraine personnel at a As the Sunflower Whispers premiere

In 2025, As the Sunflower Whispers, directed by Samuel Felinton, was announced as a documentary inspired by interviews from the MUkraine podcast.
