= Bohdan Kutiepov =

Ukrainian journalist and freelance musician

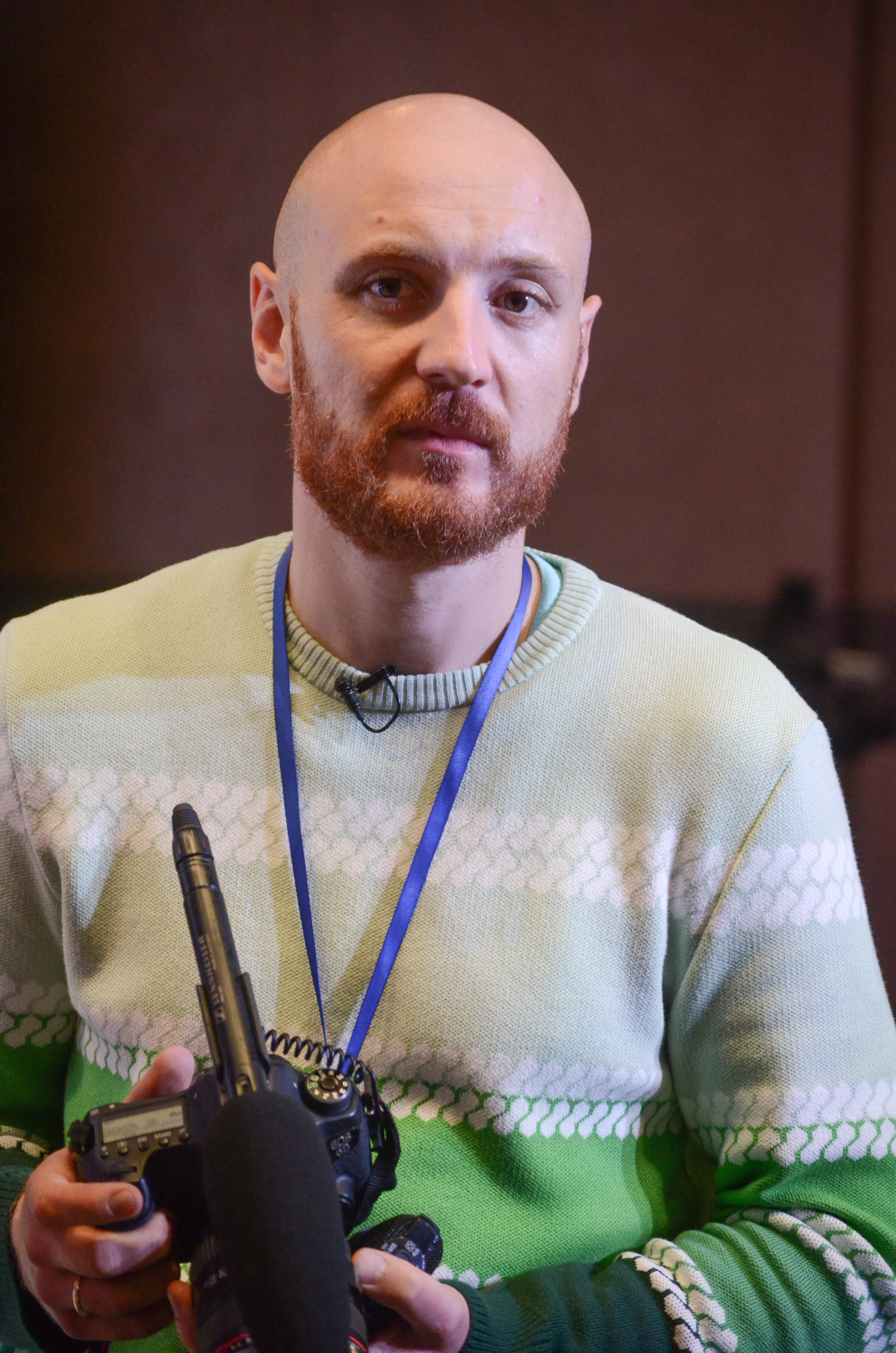
Bohdan Kutiepov, 2016

Bohdan Volodymyrovych Kutiepov is a Ukrainian journalist and freelance musician (bayan). Along with Haydamaky, in 2014 recorded a musical video clip "Arkana".

== Biography ==
Born in Kyiv, Kutiepov graduated the high school No.2 in Yahotyn (Kyiv Oblast). In 2006 he graduated the Journalism Institute of the Kyiv University.

Between 2006 and 2010 Kutepov worked as a journalist-investigator for several television channels: Tonis, STB, and TVi. During that period in 2008 he married another journalist from ICTV, Khrystyna Kotsira. After that Kutepov worked for journal Telekritika. Since 2013, he is a journalist of Hromadske TV.

He was attacked by the police when reporting protests against the government’s quarantine restrictions in Kyiv in May 2020.

== Music videos ==
- 2013 – "Azarov, Arbuzov"
- 2014 – "Arkana"
