= Bucha (film) =

- Directed by: Stanislav Tiunov
- Written by: Oleksandr Shchur
- Produced by: Aleksandr Shchur
- Starring: Sergey Strelnikov; Vyacheslav Dovzhenko; Cezary Łukaszewicz; Anastasia Nesterenko
- Cinematography: Yevhenii Kirei
- Music by: Isa Melikov
- Production company: LEVEL
- Distributed by: B&H Film Distribution Company
- Release date: November 2024
- Running time: 118 minutes
- Country: Ukraine
- Language: Ukrainian

Bucha is a Ukrainian feature docudrama directed by Stanislav Tiunov about a volunteer who evacuates people from Bucha during the mass killing of local residents organized by the Russian army, the Bucha massacre. The film is based on the real biography of volunteer Konstantin Gudaúskas. The film’s release was the 7th of November 2024.

During the Russian occupation of the Kyiv suburbs at least 1,374 civilians were killed. After liberation, mass graves and evidence of atrocities committed by Russian soldiers were found in Bucha.

== Plot ==
The film is based on the true story of Konstantin Gudaúskas, a volunteer who evacuated dozens of people from Bucha, Vorzel and other places occupied by Russia. Konstantin is a Lithuanian who was born in Kazakhstan, and his "friendly£, from the point of view of Russians, Kazakh passport helped him pass through Russian checkpoints.

== Cast ==
- Cezary Łukaszewicz as Konstantin Gudaúskас
- Vyacheslav Dovzhenko as FSB colonel
- Sergey Strelnikov as Aleksandr
- Artemii Egorov as Stanislav
- Aleksandr Kryzhanovsky as Yevgeny Nikolaevich
- Anastasia Nesterenko as Ira
- Nikon Fedotov as Dima

== Production ==
When developing the script, the filmmakers relied on Gudaúskas’s accounts and consultations with the Main Intelligence Directorate of the Ministry of Defence of Ukraine. According to the BBC, most of the storylines presented in the film “in one way or another correspond to what happened in the occupied Kyiv region”. To record the dialogue between Russian soldiers, published recordings of intercepted communications were used. Trophy APCs and trucks captured by the Ukrainian army were used as Russian military vehicles in the film.

In addition to the feature film, the crew is also working on a documentary film with eyewitness testimonies that were recorded during the making of the feature.

Filming is financed with private funds, in particular from American investor Semyon Dukach.

== Release ==
=== Premiere ===
In 2023 the film was presented at a special event of the Berlin International Film Festival, at separate screenings in New York and Boston, at the Venice Film Festival and at the Toronto International Film Festival.

On 24 February 2024, for the second anniversary of the start of Russia’s full-scale invasion of Ukraine, a screening of rough-cut material was planned in Los Angeles.

In February 2024, as part of the Ukrainian documentary film festival Cinema for Victory, the first public screening took place.

== Reception ==
Even before its release the film was criticized for coming out “too early”, while the trauma of those affected is still too fresh, and for being a fiction film rather than a documentary. Additional criticism was sparked by one of the English-language posters, which reads “Bucha” and shows a partially destroyed apartment building in Borodianka, which some regarded as a crude inaccuracy (although part of the film’s events also takes place in Borodianka).
