= Best in Hell =

2022 Russian movie about war in Ukraine

- Best in Hell Movie poster
- Directed by: Andrey Batov
- Written by: Anton Zimin; Aleksey Nagin
- Produced by: Sergey Shcheglov; Irina Zaitseva; Alexander Koldakov; Heinrich Ken; Evgeny Prigozhin
- Music by: Vitaly Mukanyayev
- Distributed by: Aurum Production
- Release date: October 5, 2022
- Running time: 109 minutes
- Country: Russia
- Language: Russian

Best in Hell (Russian: Лучшие в аду) is a 2022 Russian war film and action film directed by Andrey Batov. The premiere in Russia took place on October 5, 2022. Yevgeny Prigozhin is also named among the creators of the film.

== Plot ==
The units of "whites" carry out an assault operation to capture several buildings; their task is to occupy an observation post and direct attack aircraft to targets behind enemy lines. They are opposed by the "yellow" units, who have entrenched in these buildings and are also ready to fight to the end.

The nationality of the "whites" and "yellows", the year and place of the battle are not indicated in the film; however, it is assumed that the "whites" represent Wagner PMC, and the "yellows", apparently, are fighters of the Armed Forces of Ukraine.

== Cast ==
- Aleksei Kravchenko as "Shopot"
- Dmitry Murashev as "Buran", commander of the Yellows
- Georgy Marishin as "Rang", machine gunner of the Yellows
- Anton Bagmet as "Ruchey", chief of the Yellow artillery
- Vladislav Demin as "Mramor", chief of staff of the Whites
- Mikhail Bogdanov as "Shama", machine gunner of the Whites
- Andrey Papanin as "Abricos", commander of the White Artillery Battery
- Zakhar Tcherezov as "Simon", commander of the Yellow reserve group
- Sergei Bespalov as "Lokomotiv", tank commander of the Whites

== Reaction ==
Rossiyskaya Gazeta: the movie depicts "hard combat work without embellishment, reflection and lyrical digressions. For an hour and a half, equal, tactically savvy, uncompromising and generally similar opponents confront each other to the death – with the important amendment that the former have a contract with the Motherland and Conscience, and the latter, unfortunately, took the side of the enemy. The realism here is perhaps unprecedented: besides everything else, Best in Hell needs to be seen if only to understand how much physical and mental super-effort, how much shed blood and sweat a modern armed conflict requires – even when it comes to execution of some ordinary local problem".

Newspaper "Vek": "Few war films can boast the authenticity of the events they depict. Artistic license and authorial invention make cinema more interesting for the viewer, but at the same time less realistic. Best in Hell is a pleasant exception, which not only effectively shows all stages of a real battle but also manages to embed highly important, unconventional ideas for our time".

Alexander Gubkin (Echo Severa): "The entire film is an adaptation of a routine operation to clear several buildings and reach the only nine-story building in the area to direct allied aircraft. That's it; don't expect anything more. There is no drama, no conflict, no propaganda, and almost no ideology here. In principle, an advertisement for a cool sports car doesn't need any of that either, and Best in Hell is shot on the same principle as an advertisement for something truly masculine, likewise needing neither character development, backstory, nor a plot arc".

Igor Talalaev (25th Frame): "The realism is such that during the credits you won't even be able to remember whether any music played at all, or if the entire soundtrack consisted only of hoarse shouts, sparse radio commands, and the roar of explosions. In short, we have before us an exemplary modern war action film that will appeal to fans of the male cinema genre. There is so much drive and gunfire here that it would be more than enough for a dozen lesser-caliber films".

The TV Rain channel gave the film a positive assessment, calling it "a rough, but still anti-war statement". Thus, Alexey Korostelev noted "something Tarantino-esque" in the director's work, assessed the role of Kravchenko and summed up: "No one will win in this massacre except Death, and one of the main 'hawks' of the Russian government, Putin's cook, told us about this ... Evgeny Prigozhin".

== See also ==
- Tarantinoesque film

== See also ==
- Hotsunlight
