= Natalya Vorozhbyt =

Ukrainian playwright and screenwriter

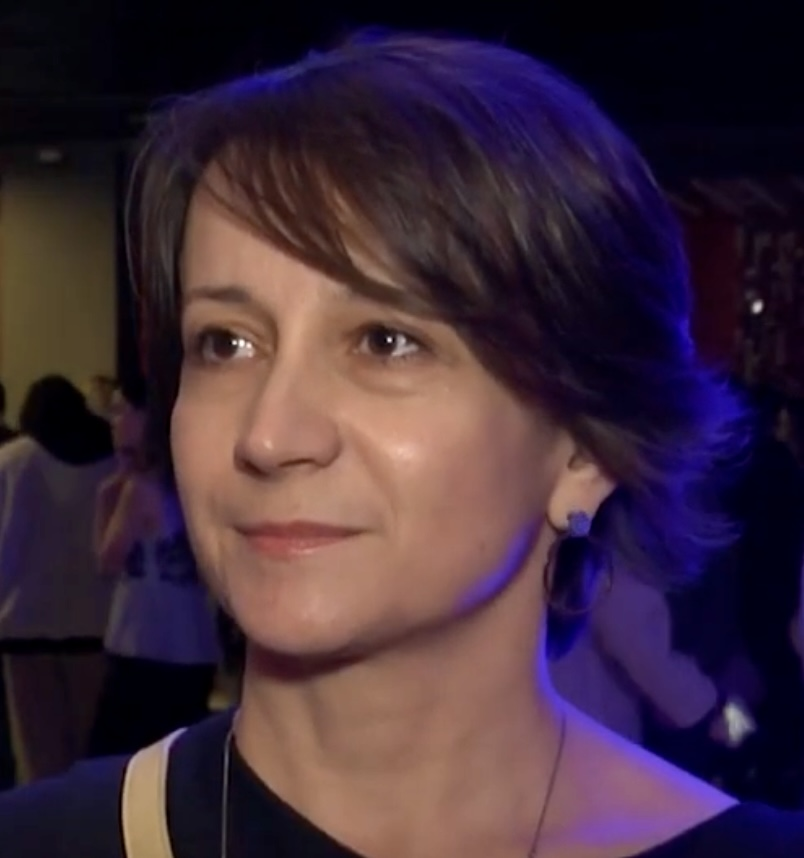
2023 Image of Natalya Vorozhbit

Nataliia Anatoliivna Vorozhbyt (Ukrainian: Наталія Анатоліївна Ворожбит) (born 4 April 1975) is a Ukrainian playwright, screenwriter and director. Vorozhbyt prefers to be referred to professionally as Natalka, the diminutive form of her name.

== Career ==
Vorozhbyt graduated in 2000 from the Maxim Gorky Literature Institute in Moscow. She has also studied at the Iowa Writers Workshop. She was a Visiting Fellow and Ukrainian Writer in Residence at St Hugh's College, Oxford for the 2023-24 term. She was named a member of PEN Ukraine in May 2024.

Over the years she has written her scripts in both Russian and Ukrainian. This however increasingly caused her pain. Speaking to a reporter for The Moscow Times in 2014, she said, "In connection with the anti-Russian mood, many of my Ukrainian friends have purposefully switched to Ukrainian exclusively. The pain and hurt and protest that I feel make me want to do the same. I very much feel that moment has arrived. Then I think, damn it, Russian is my language, too. Why should I have to give it up? I love it. I write in it. Protest against myself? I won't do that." However, by the following year she was writing almost exclusively in Ukrainian.

Together with German director Georg Genoux she founded the Theater of the Displaced, where refugees from Donbas could tell their stories, and curated the Class Act project. She wrote the screenplay for the feature film Cyborgs about the defense of Sergei Prokoviev Airport near Donetsk, where Ukrainian soldiers fought for 242 days against separatists. Vorozhbyt traveled through the war zone for four months and spoke with those involved. The war situation in Ukraine is a frequent theme in her work.

She took part in the 2013 Euromaidan protests. During this time she also collected inspiration for new work. She has previously collaborated with the Royal Court Theatre and Royal Shakespeare Company.

Her play The Grain Store was commissioned by, and produced at, the Royal Court in London in 2009. In his review of the play, Michael Billington wrote, "No single play can convey the full horror of Stalinist genocide, but this one reminds us of an event that, as George Orwell said, English russophiles tend to blot out." It was published by Nick Hern the same year.

Vorozhbyt's best-known work is Bad Roads (2017), an episodic play written in 2014 about the War in Donbas in Eastern Ukraine. Produced over a dozen times around the world, stand-out productions include one at Crow's Theatre in Toronto, Canada, in 2023, about which Broadway World Toronto wrote, "It's fascinating, disturbing stuff with a powerhouse cast, literally unsettling: never completely relaxing into a style or structure," and at the Götesborg Stadsteater in Sweden in 2024, about which Sveriges Television (SVT) wrote, "Bad Roads is among the most urgent things you can see on the Swedish theater scene right now." Vorozhbyt directed a film version of the play in 2021 which was the Ukrainian nomination to the Oscar Award process for foreign films.

In 2023 the Münchner Kammerspiele commissioned Vorozhbyt to write Green Corridors, a play observing various Ukrainians forced into rushed and unwanted exile by the large-scale Russian invasion of 2022. About this world premiere in April, one German critic wrote, "Munich has never seen anything like this." The play had its Ukrainian premiere in May 2023 at Kyiv's Theater of Playwrights, of which Vorozhbyt is a founding member.

In February 2022, Vorozhbyt was working on her latest film Demons in Myrhorod and had only four days of production to complete; it is about a relationship between a Russian and Ukrainian, reflecting what she called the 'uneasy' international relations between these nations, when the city she was in came under bombardment during the Russian invasion. She was interviewed in a bomb shelter on 25 February 2022, saying that it was 'very important for me to be here' but admitting she may have to leave the country if Russia took over. Her interpretation of these events is that they began thirty years ago when Ukraine was being established as an independent country and allowed the Russian influence in Donbas to grow. She has repeatedly appealed to the international community for support for Ukraine.

== Works ==
Sources:

- The Life of the Simple, 1994. Youth Theater, Kyiv, 1995.
- The Little Match Girl, 1996. Priyut Komedianta Theater, St. Petersburg, Russia, 2003.
- Superboom and Other Gifts, 1997
- The Screen, 1999. Kukushkino Gnezdo, Novorossiisk, Russia, 2004
- Galka Motalko, 2002. Playwright and Director Center, Moscow
- What Do You Want, Ukrainian God? 2004. Royal Court Theatre
- Demons, 2004
- I Join, 2005, Tristan Bates Theatre, London
- The Khomenko Family Chronicles, 2006. Royal Court Theatre
- The Grain Store, 2009, ISBN 9781848420458
- Take the Rubbish Out, Sasha, 2014. A Play, a Pie, a Pint, Glasgow, Scotland, 2015
- Maidan: Voices of the Uprising, 2015. Royal Court Theatre
- Bad Roads, the play, 2017. ISBN 9781848427143
- My Mykolaivka, 2017
- Blood Sisters, 2019
- Bad Roads, the film, 2020
- Green Corridors, 2023
