= Ruslan Horovyi =

Ukrainian journalist, author, and director

Ruslan Horovyi Руслан Горовий
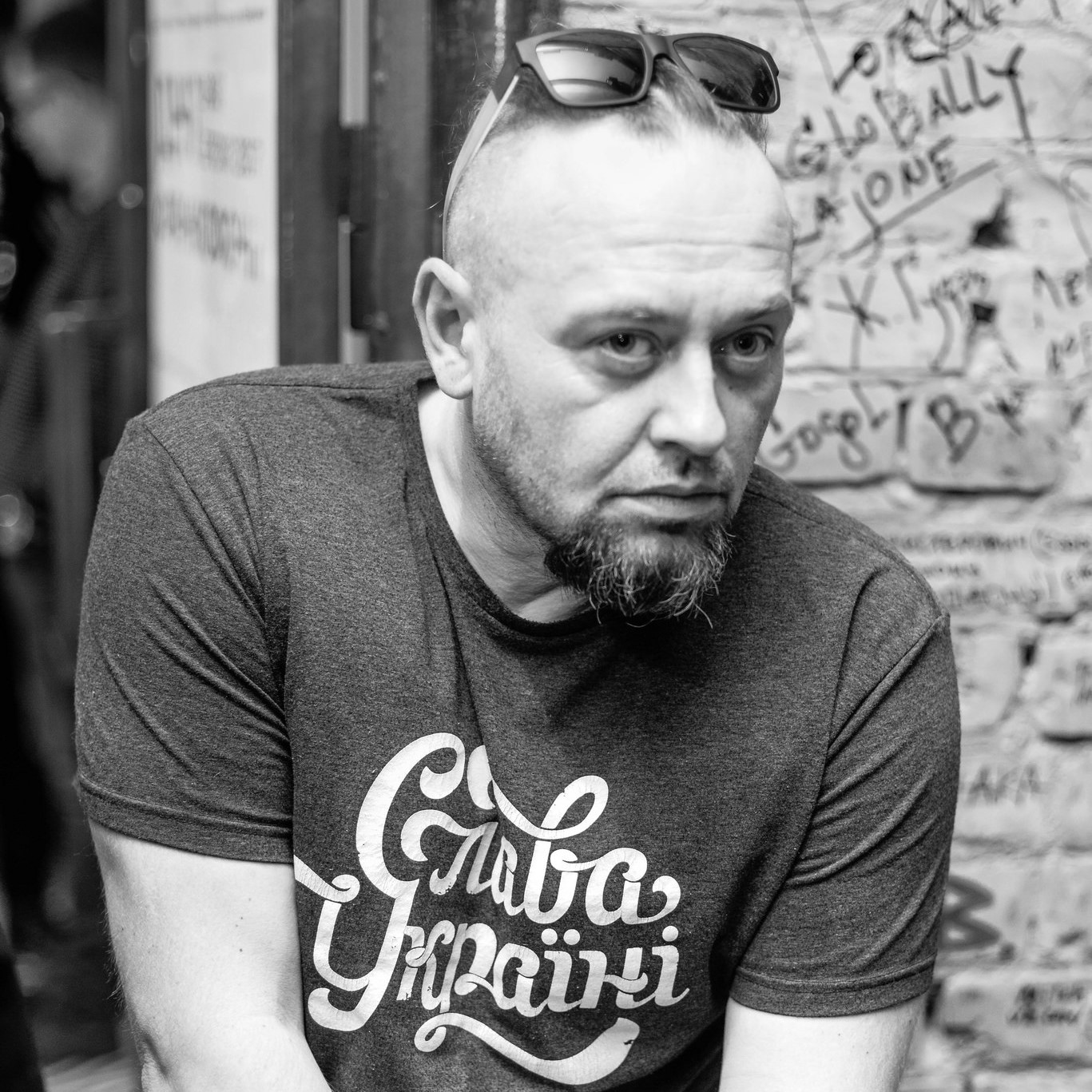
- Born: Ruslan Volodymyrovych Horovyi; Ukrainian: Руслан Володимирович Горовий; February 29, 1976; Konotop, Ukrainian SSR, Soviet Union
- Citizenship: Ukraine
- Education: Journalist
- Alma mater: Kyiv National University of Culture and Arts (2006)
- Occupations: Journalist, writer
- Writing career
- Notable awards: Merited Journalist of Ukraine (2008)

Ruslan Horovyi (born February 29, 1976) is a Ukrainian journalist, author of the “Children’s Search Service” TV-show (since 2001), Merited Journalist of Ukraine, documentary director, writer (15 books since 2002).

== Biography ==
Ruslan Horovyi was born on 29 February 1976 in the town of Konotop of Sumy region. The oldest child, he has a brother and a sister. Konotop – the land of legends is a book he devoted to his hometown (publishing house “TaTySho”, 2018).

After graduating from High School Number 3, he entered Konotop Electrical Engineering College. After the collapse of the USSR, there were few local opportunities and his outlook was extremely bleak. So, dropping out of his third year of studies, Ruslan set off on a journey to Europe (partly described in the story Ninetieth Wave of Migration). He returned after five years of being abroad, studied, went in for TV journalism, wrote poems, songs and prose.

Now he lives in Kyiv. He has two children from his first wife. His second daughter, Daryna, was born on 12 September 2017 to his current wife.

== Journalism and social activism ==
After returning from abroad Ruslan started working in journalism, for KST (Konotop) TV production company. Then Ruslan worked for the Eastern Project (Kramatorsk) newspaper, and the Alternative media group (Kyiv). Since 1998 he worked at Magnoliya-TV and became Executive Director of the ChP.INFO (ЧП.інфо) channel. In 2001, Ruslan Horovyi began developing his project “Children’s Search Service”, with the goal of helping to find missing kids: making the videos and printed materials about them, informing the public, collecting and processing information (“Children’s Search Service” reception and telephone hotline), helping lost children to return home.

In 2006, he graduated with honours from the Kyiv National University of Culture and Arts for cinema and television specializing in directing films and television.

Among the honours for his work, Ruslan Volodymyrovych has received the Order of St. Michael Archistrategos from Patriarch Filaret (Ukrainian Orthodox Church of the Kyivan Patriarchate) and the honorary title of the Merited Journalist of Ukraine from the President of Ukraine Viktor Yushchenko.

Since the time of EuroMaidan he has been an active volunteer, participating activities of the Charitable Foundation Free UA (Work in Eastern Ukraine), as well as helping the children of Ladyzhin and Medzhybizh orphanages.

=== Films ===
- 2013 – Kyiv Flood. The tape is devoted to the Kurenivka mudslide
- 2015 – Ukrops of Donbas. On April 11, 2015, the TV channel ChP.INFO (ЧП.ІНФО) showed the premiere of this documentary film by Ruslan Horovyi. Ukrops is based on a story of Luhansk resident loyal to the Ukrainian state, tortured for that reason by Russian occupants in 2014 during the conflict in Eastern Ukraine. Since late 2015 at the initiative of public figures, activists, diaspora communities and diplomats, screening of this film was held in different countries and even at the UN headquarters.
- 2017 – Refugee

== Literature ==
Ruslan Vladymyrovych's creativity is characterized by a sober, humanistic view of the events of modern history and modern times. Prose works are filled with warm everyday stories about ordinary or unique people, which can be easily found on the street, or when traveling by train; sources of creativity are often the memories of the elderly, urban legends, his own rich life experience. One of the sources of inspiration is his work: in numerous stories he reveals the problems of social injustice, economic (often criminal) processes of the formation of capitalism, the spiritual crisis associated with the collapse of the Soviet identity and the formation of Ukrainian self-consciousness. His works are characterized by acute social themes, enthusiastic knockdown plots, psychology. A number of works return readers to the Chornobyl tragedy, as one of the decisive events in the recent history of Ukraine.

The books Ruslan Horovyi published to-date

- 2002 – Таран (Ram)
- 2008 – Країна «У» (U-Country)
- 2011 – Buenos dias, chica
- 2013 – Гагарін і Барселона (Gagarin and Barcelona)
- 2014 – Ген воїна (Warrior's gene)
- 2015, 2016 – Казки на ніч (Good night tales)
- 2015 – 13 оповідань, або Те, повз що ми проходимо не помічаючи (13 stories or Things we passed by without noticing)
- 2016 – 40 ...або чому чуваки не святкують (Life ends at 40)
- 2017 – 1000 і 1 Ніч війни (1,000 and 1 night of war)
- 2018 – Конотоп Земля Легенд (Konotop – Land of Legends)
- 2018 – Усі ми не з Києва (All of us are not from Kyiv)
- 2019 – Про людей (About humans)
- 2020 – Ми (We)
- 2022 – Поіменник (Name by name)
- 2023 – Жили собі люди / Once upon a nation (bilingual edition)
- 2024 — Скабки. Маленькі трісочки під шкірою (Splinters)

Since 2017 Molodyi Theatre in Kyiv has a play Gagarin and Barcelona based on Horovyi's prose (and few other modern Ukrainian writings). Based on the stories of Ruslan Horovyi, director Julia Tamtura has made a short feature film The Moment, which won a prize at the Molodist Film Festival in Kyiv.
