= Our Kitties =

2020 film directed by Volodymyr Tykhyi

- Directed by: Volodymyr Tyhyi
- Release date: 30 January 2020
- Country: Ukraine
- Language: Ukrainian

Our Kitties or Lethal Kittens (full title: Our Kitties or How We Learned to Love Shovels in Conditions of a Limited Anti-Terrorist Operation with Elements of Temporary Martial Law), working titles 'Bunker' and 'Kitten with Burning Eyes', is a co-produced Ukrainian comedy film directed by Volodymyr Tyhyi about the adventures of Ukrainian army soldiers during the Russian-Ukrainian war in Eastern Ukraine in 2014.

The film's slogan is "a patriotic politically incorrect comedy, Our Kitties". The film was released in Ukrainian cinemas on 30 January 2020.

== Plot ==
The events of the film take place in 2014 at the beginning of the Russian-Ukrainian war. It is a tragicomic story of the adventures of three Anti-Terrorist Operation (ATO) soldiers during their combat rotation in the "most remote" position on the front line. The film is based on real-life stories of volunteer fighters and Ukrainian Armed Forces.

The main characters are an engineer, an actor, a football coach, and a flower seller, who volunteer to join the war. An ambitious journalist, who is on a secret mission, joins them at their position. None of the fighters have combat experience, know nothing about the intentions of the command, and are unfamiliar with the terrain. However, it is these characters who become the cause of a grandiose failure in the enemy's large-scale operation. Courage, bravery, a bit of hypnosis, and trademark humor create an explosive mixture for a "warm welcome."

== Production ==
=== Budget ===
Director and screenplay writer Volodymyr Tykhyi, together with the co-producer of the film Marko Suprun, hoped to secure most of the funding for the film through a patriotic pitch at the Ministry of Culture in 2018. In June 2018, the film, then titled "Blinzash" (Bunker), participated in the competitive selection of the Ministry of Culture of Ukraine for receiving state financial support for the production and distribution of patriotic films. With an average score of 32.9, the film did not make it to the list of 69 films that would receive financial support from the Ministry of Culture. The creators of the film requested a state financial support of ₴36 million (80% of the initial budget of ₴45 million) from the Ministry of Culture. After the announcement of the results of the patriotic pitch, Volodymyr Tykhyi publicly expressed his disagreement with the outcomes, stating that he disagreed with the composition of the expert commission, which was composed of representatives from television and film sales, including Star Media and Film.ua, who produce most of their content in Russian for Russia.

Later, in June 2019, the film, then titled "Lethal Kittens," became the winner of the pitching competition organized by the Ukrainian Cultural Foundation (UCF) for the completion of film production and promotional campaign. The film received 239.5 points from UCF experts. The creators received ₴8.9 million from the UCF for the completion of film production and the promotional campaign, which amounted to 21.12% of the final budget (the initial budget proposal for post-production and promotion was ₴12.7 million).

In July 2019, the film, still under the working title "Lethal Kittens," became the winner of the eleventh competitive selection by the State Film Agency. The total budget for the film was initially stated as ₴40.4 million, and the creators requested ₴7.3 million from the State Film Agency. However, in the final result, the creators received financial support of only ₴0.98 million (2.33% of the final budget). Additionally, the State Film Agency partially funded the film's promotional campaign with a grant of ₴400,000 (10.8% of the total promotional campaign budget).

In total, the state (UCF, State Film Agency) sponsored ₴10.0 million (approximately 23.4% of the total final budget).

In addition to the state funding, producer Marko Suprun, through his film company Bedlam Productions, and Stepan Bandera Jr., through his film company Banesto Productions, managed to attract funds from private investors in the United States and Canada. Former Acting Minister of Health of Ukraine, Ulyana Suprun, became one of the film's producers.

=== Script and filming ===
Initially, the idea emerged to create a small series of short episodes within the framework of Babylon'13 and name it "Blindazh" (Bunker). In 2015, Tikhyy and former ATO participant Valeriy Puzik organized video materials, edited three episodes, and anticipated that the project would interest TV channels. However, this did not happen, and none of the Ukrainian TV channels showed interest.

Later, the idea of making a feature film emerged, and Volodymyr Tikhyy wrote the script for the feature film in 2017–2018.

The filming of the movie took place for three months in 2018–2019 in Chernihiv Oblast. Later, there was an additional week of reshoots for various details. During filming in Chernihiv, an incident occurred when the creators were shooting a scene involving "militants" near the Donetsk Regional State Administration building. Local residents did not realize that it was a movie shoot and called the police.

Post-production took 14 months.

== Release ==
Initially, the film's creators planned for it to be released in Ukrainian cinemas in November 2019.

The first trailer for the film was released on 1 October 2019, followed by the second trailer on 22 November. The film was distributed by B&H, and its release took place on 30 January 2020.

=== Advertising campaign ===
The creators of the film decided to launch a "viral advertising" campaign and filmed a whole series of videos using deepfake and editing techniques. These videos showcased fake reactions to the film's trailer from Russian politicians, such as Vladimir Zhirinovsky in the program "60 Minutes" on the Russian TV channel Russia-1, as well as fake videos featuring support for the film from well-known Hollywood actors, and more.

== Book ==
Based on the screenplay of the 2020 film, a book was written and published by Folio Publishers:
