= Taras Kostanchuk =

Ukrainian activist (born 1964)

- Тарас Дмитрович Костанчук
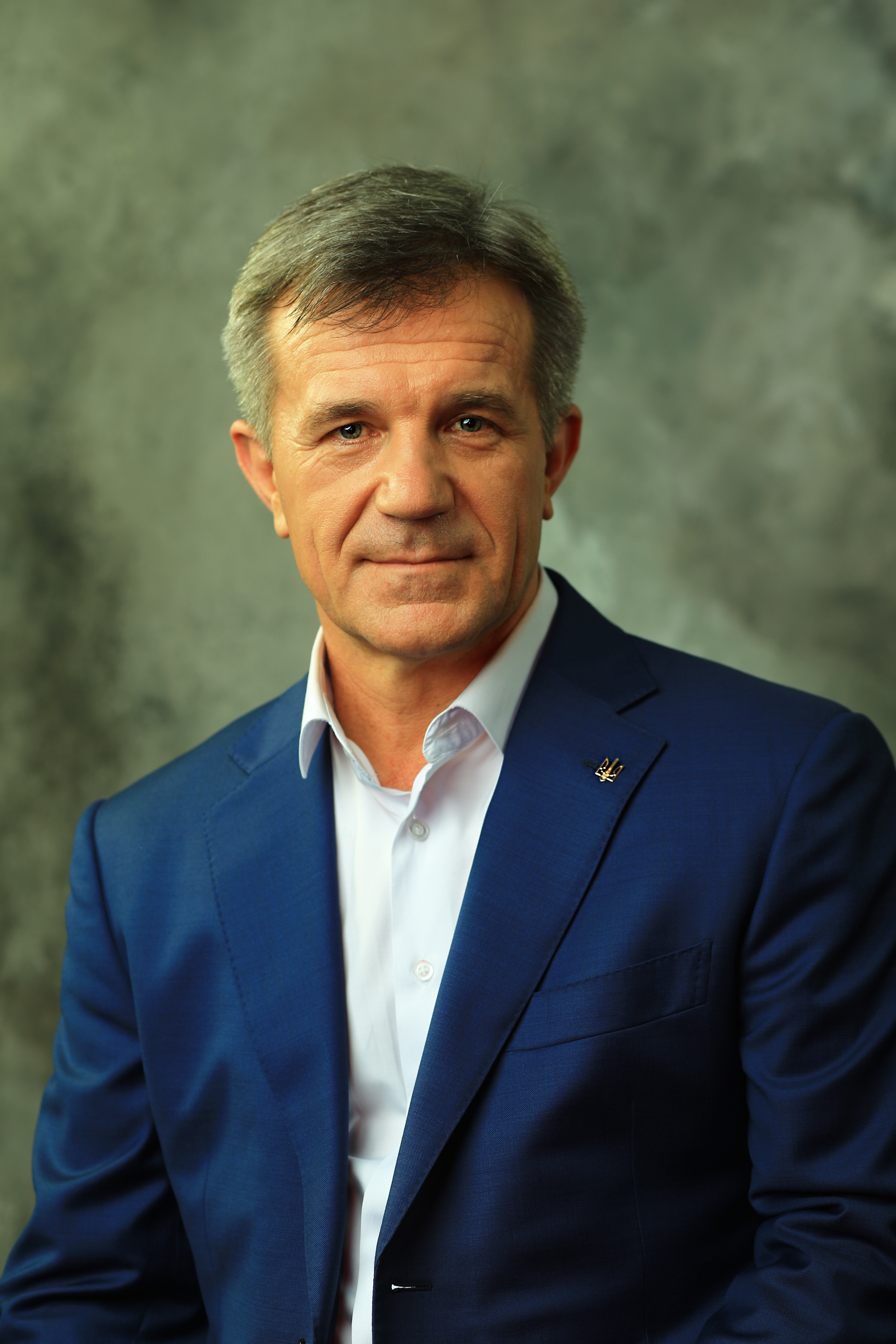
- Born: Taras Dmytrovych Kostanchuk; 9 March 1964 (age 62); Alchevsk, Ukrainian SSR, Soviet Union
- Military career
- Allegiance: Soviet Union (1983–1991); Ukraine (1992–present)
- Branch: National Guard of Ukraine
- Nickname: Bishut
- Commands: Volunteer battalion “Donbas”
- Conflicts: Soviet Army of the USSR, Grozny, Chechnya; war in the East of Ukraine
- Awards: Order of Merit 3rd Class Medal For Military Service to Ukraine

Taras Dmytrovych Kostanchuk (Ukrainian: Тара́с Дми́трович Костанчу́к; born 9 March 1964) is a Ukrainian public activist. He is the leader of the civil organization "Military-Patriotic Association of the ATO participants "Justice" and the former commander of the assault group of the volunteer battalion “Donbas” (2014). He is a former candidate for president of Ukraine and a candidate for the People's Deputies of Ukraine. He was demobilized in the spring of 2015.

== Biography ==
Kostanchuk was born on 9 March 1964, in the city of Komunarsk, Voroshilovgrad Oblast, the Ukrainian SSR (now known as Alchevsk, Luhansk Oblast) in a family of thermophysicists. His mother is from Vinnytsia Oblast, and his father is from Kherson Oblast. Kostanchuk lived in Kyiv since he was 3 years old.

In 1981, Kostanchuk graduated from Kyiv secondary school No. 200 where he studied mathematics. After school, he entered the Kyiv Medical College No.3.

From 1982 to 1984, he served in the Soviet Army in Grozny, Chechnya.

From 1985 to 1988, he studied at the Taras Shevchenko National University of Kyiv (Department of Biology).

In 1989, Kostanchuk went to Italy, where he lived and worked until 1998.

In 1998, he returned to Ukraine, accepting his friend's proposal to take over the post of general director of CJSC “Agro-Transport Coordination Service” (ZAT “Ahro-transportna koordynatsiina sluzhba”).

From 2003 to 2008, Kostanchuk studied law at the Kyiv National University of Internal Affairs of Ukraine.

Since 2007, he has run his legal practice as an entrepreneur.

== Activity ==
=== Public activity before the Revolution of Dignity ===
In 2005, Kostanchuk, together with his comrades, founded a public organization "Archaeological Patriotic Search Association "Dnipro-Ukraine", which was engaged in the search and reburial of the remains of World War II soldiers. The organization actually operates ion the territory of the Kyiv Oblast. The organization, for 7 years of its existence, recorded more than 800 soldiers, identified 106 names, and organized 17 mass and 11 single reburials.

Under the direction of Kostanchuk, the searchers created a large stationary museum of military archaeology in Kyiv and 10 museums in secondary schools throughout Ukraine. There are more than 5000 items in museums; 1774 units of explosives objects were transferred to the Ministry of Emergency Situations of Ukraine for elimination.

External videos
- "Захід "Благо Дарю" - відповідь волонтерам" on YouTube // Espreso.TV, 5 December 2015

=== Participation in the Revolution of Dignity (2013-2014) ===
During the Revolution of Dignity (2013–2014), Kostanchuk was on Maidan Nezalezhnosti from the first days. As one of the oldest participants, he frequently had to take command and coordinate the actions of the activists. On the night of February 19, 2014, he held a line along with other patriots, which became a shield against fire engines with water jets. The same day, Kostanchuk received a blast injury and had his leg wounded due to a grenade explosion.

=== Participation in Anti-Terrorist Operation (ATO) ===
In May 2014, Kostanchuk went to Donbas with his personal weapons, where he joined the so-called “men in black” who opposed the militiamen in several districts of the Donetsk Oblast. From June 1, 2014, he arrived to the training base, in the village of Novi Petrivtsi (Kyiv Oblast), in order to train volunteers – who prepared to go to the ATO area.

External videos
- "Donbass" battalion training at the Novi Petrivtsi village (2014)" on YouTube // Justice Ukraine, 2 June 2017

In early July 2014, after three weeks of training, Kostanchuk joined a volunteer battalion "Donbas", and went with his comrades to the combat zone near Artemivsk.

On the first night in the ATO area, the recruits of the battalion “Donbas”, being at the temporary base of the battalion in the Artemivsk school, fell under the tight fire of the enemy. Under the command of Kostanchuk they managed to repel the fire and defend their positions without loss.

External videos
- "Bishut tells of attack of militants in Artemivsk" on YouTube // Justice Ukraine, Summer 2014

Reflecting on the night attack of militants, the fighters of the battalion “Donbas” took active steps to liberate Artemivsk from terrorists, built checkpoints in and outside of the city, and prepared a cleansing operation.

In July 2014, Kostanchuk as the commander of the assault group of the battalion “Donbas” with his comrades conducted operations to liberate the Ukrainian cities of Popasna, Lysychansk, and Pervomaisk.

=== Battle of Ilovaisk ===
On 10 August 2014, the Armed Forces of Ukraine along with the fighters of the battalions “Donbas”, “Azov”, “Shakhtarsk” and “Right Sector” began an operation to liberate the city of Ilovaisk.

General Ruslan Khomchak was planning the operation together with the commanders of the battalions. Kostanchuk also participated in the planning of the liberation.

The main task was to liberate Ilovaisk completely from terrorists and to take the city. The minimum goal was to conduct the "developing attack" to get information about the enemy forces. That task was fulfilled during the first entry in Ilovaisk on August 10, 2014. It was found that the enemy was well-positioned. The volunteer battalions needed reinforcement.

External videos
- "Fight near Ilovaisk: volunteer battalions could not take the city" on YouTube // Radio Liberty Ukraine, 11 August 2014

External videos
- "Ilovaisk. How it was" on YouTube // Denis Kazanskyi, 20 January 2016

On 18 August 2014, the fighters of the battalion “Donbas” entered with heavy fighting in Ilovaisk and were able to knock out terrorists from the eastern part of the city. During the battles, 3 checkpoints and 4 enemy firing points were destroyed.

Until the morning of the 19th, the ATO forces took control over most of the city.

On 19 August, during a combat task, Kostanchuk, having been seriously injured in his head and with a blast injury, was encircled by the enemy in the center of Ilovaisk. Together with a comrade who was seriously injured in the leg, Kostanchuk whid in a resident's house for three weeks.

After three weeks, he was able to get out of the encirclement, thanks to the help of local patriots.

External videos
- "Ilovajsk. The story of a fighter who came out of hell" on YouTube // Espreso.TV, 28 August 2016

=== Public activity after participation in ATO ===
Immediately after treatment and short-term rehabilitation, Kostanchuk began to take charge of the liberation of his comrades from captivity. He took part in negotiations with separatists, agreed on the exchange of prisoners, helped to bring them out of the ATO.

At the end of 2014, Kostanchuk, along with his military comrades, created a civil organization,"Military-Patriotic Association of the ATO participants "Justice". The purpose of the organization was to protect the interests of ordinary citizens, fight against arbitrariness and corruption of officials, and assist the former ATO participants.

External videos
- "Justice" Press conference of the "Battalion Donbass" Soldiers" on YouTube // "Battalion Donbass", 15 January 2015

The organization has its representative offices in several cities of Ukraine. In August 2015, the "Justice" office was opened in the city of Vyshneve, Kyiv oblast. Apart from soldiers, the organization includes activists, volunteers, public representatives and entrepreneurs. The organization "Justice" has currently thousands of participants.

External videos
- "The opening of the Justice office in Vyshneve" on YouTube // Ukraine Justice, 6 September 2015

CO "Justice" took large-scale actions against the arbitrariness of some public authorities, led demonstrations, and wrote petitions to the President of Ukraine on the protection of the rights of volunteers. It led direct actions to protect the interests of Ukrainian citizens. In particular, Kostanchuk worked personally on the amendment to the Law of Ukraine on social protection of reservists suffering from participation in the ATO, and their family members. The main purpose was to change the status of volunteers, who were sent to the ATO zone illegally from May to December 2014 as reservists, to military personnel, and thus to overcome injustice in providing social benefits and other assistance to soldiers.

The law was voted by deputies of the Verkhovna Rada of Ukraine and signed by the president of Ukraine as a result of repeated pressure on officials during the public actions, disclosure of this problem in the media, and personal involvement of Kostanchuk in drafting the law.

External videos
- "From Reservists to Participants - Windows-News - September 24, 2015" on YouTube // Windows-News, 24 September 2015

At the beginning of 2015, Kostanchuk, along with the fighters, who went through the Battle of Ilovaisk, and the families of the dead soldiers, founded the Ilovaisk Brotherhood, which at present has more than two thousand members, comrades from different units of the Ukrainian armed forces and volunteer battalions.

The members of the Ilovaisk Brotherhood helped each other to coordinate actions and shared information about the wounded, captured, and dead soldiers.

By the first anniversary of the Ilovaisk tragedy (August 2015), the members of the Ilovaisk Brotherhood introduced the "Ilovaisk 2014" award, a cross symbol. Only Ilovaisk fighters, or the families of dead or missing soldiers, have the right to receive it.

After several joint actions of the Ilovaisk Brotherhood from December 2015 to February 2016 with the demands to punish the culpable in the most massive tragedies of modern Ukraine (Savur-Mohyla, IL-76, Donetsk airport, Ilovaisk, Debaltseve), under pressure from ATO veterans, Kostanchuk was invited to get acquainted with criminal proceedings concerning the Ilovaisk tragedy, and received admission to the proceedings files.

In March 2016, the CO "Justice", headed by Kostanchuk, took part in the unifying congress of civic organizations and publicly announced its intention to change officials who came to power on the blood of patriots. Kostanchuk offered soldiers and ATO veterans to assume power in one team.

At the end of April 2016, Kostanchuk visited Zagreb, where he had several working meetings with veterans of the liberation war in Croatia. They shared their experience of the success of the Serb de-occupation operation and also talked about the influence and direct participation of veterans in the political and public activities of Croatia. According to Kostanchuk, this experience of the Croates should inspire them to win the war and restore the occupied territories of Ukraine.

From March to November 2016, Kostanchuk and his colleagues from the CO "Justice" visited Ukrainian cities, where he spoke with local citizens and ATO participants. At these meetings, he presented the program "Army of Dignity," which aimed at uniting fighters, ATO veterans, non-indifferent and active citizens around a common idea – the creation of a democratic, European state of Ukraine.

Kostanchuk considers introducing the "presumption of guilt" of civil servants as one of the first steps to overcoming corruption in Ukraine. When an official can not explain the legality and source of the capital he/she has acquired, he/she must become automatically a suspect in corruption and prove his/her innocence in a court:

It is necessary to propose to the Anti-Corruption Parliamentary Committee a draft law that cancels the presumption of innocence to civil servants for a long time. Each civil servant who can not explain, where he/she has money to buy expensive cars, watches, or money in cash at home, will be convicted for long-term corruption with a confiscation of property.

On 8 June 2017, Kostanchuk along with his comrades initiated the creation of the ATO Veterans' Council on Ethics and Morality to fight against pseudo-ATO organizations that use combatants in illegal schemes.

In August 2017, before the third anniversary of the Ilovaisk tragedy, Kostanchuk together with the association “Ilovaisk Brotherhood”, as well as other ATO members, members of the dead soldiers’ families, organized a large-scale action under the General Prosecutor's Office of Ukraine with demands to provide at least interim results of the investigation:

We wrote three simple demands – to make the episode of Ilovaisk tragedy a separate criminal proceeding, to give everything to the court, to identify who is guilty and who is not, and third is to rehabilitate the guys who were sentenced for desertion, and to bring the commanders to responsibility for leaving their positions.

On 12 December 2017, the CO "Justice", headed by Kostanchuk, signed an agreement with international investors on the transfer of innovative technologies to Ukraine in the agro-industrial sector. The main idea of this initiative is to reduce the existing technological and cultural gap and to use this unique opportunity for cooperation between the two countries in the interests of each of them. To this end, ATO participants with their lands for agriculture can be involved.

=== Charitable activity. Establishment of the charity fund to support the ATO participants "Justice" ===
At the beginning of 2016, Kostanchuk created a charity organization, "Justice", which aimed to help the wounded soldiers and ATO veterans, the families of the dead and missing soldiers, and the children of ATO participants.

During two years, the organization carries out events for children for various holidays, provides material assistance to the needy soldiers and their families, and organizes children's rest.

In June 2017, Kostanchuk along with fighters and volunteers of the charity fund "Justice” organized an action in support of an oncologic patient – a niece of Oleksii Dreval, who died in Ilovaisk in 2014. Together with the family of the girl and concerned citizens, they conducted several actions in front of the Cabinet of Ministers of Ukraine, the Ministry of Health of Ukraine, demanding to provide money (or letter of guarantee) from the state to carry out bone marrow transplantation operations for oncologic patients.

Thanks to the joint efforts, the girl was able to obtain an informational (guarantee) letter from the Ministry of Health of Ukraine and to conduct an operation.

== Awards ==
- Order of Merit of third class (2011) for work as a head of the CO "Dnipro-Ukraine" on the search and reburial of soldiers killed during the World War II
- Honorary Award of the President of Ukraine (2013)
- Medal For Military Service to Ukraine (2014) for liberation of Popasna and Lysychansk
- Order For Courage of the first class (2014); two times Kostanchuk was presented for awarding by the Commander of the National Guard of Ukraine, but did not receive the Order
- Award of Ministry of Interior of Ukraine “Fire Weapon” (2015) for heroic action in Ilovaisk
- Award of the Head of the Security Service of Ukraine “Fire Weapon” (2016) for assistance in the release of captive soldiers
