= Volodymyr Tykhyi =

Ukrainian film director, screenwriter and film producer

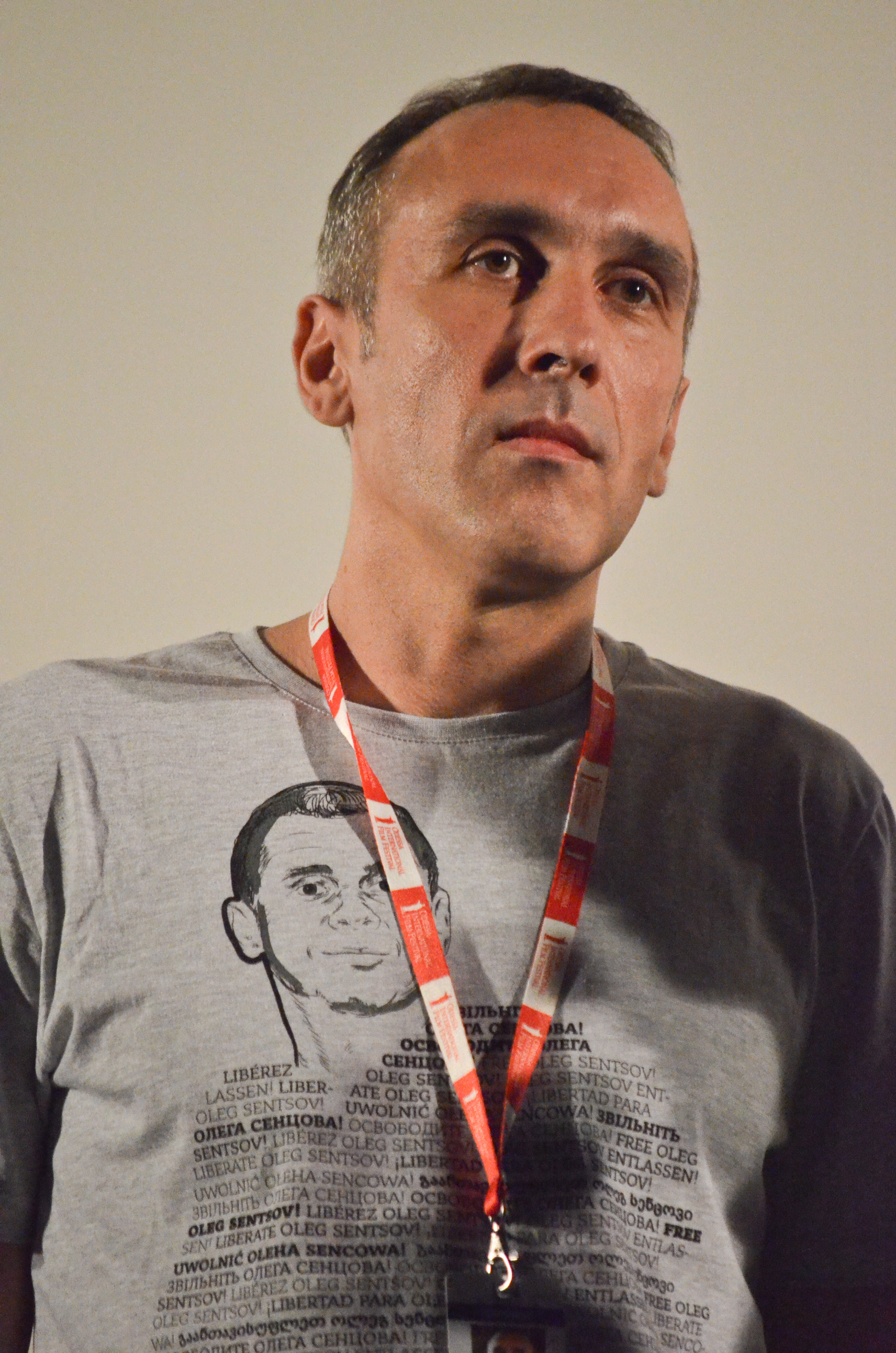

Volodymyr Viktorovych Tykhyi (Ukrainian: Володимир Вікторович Тихий; born on February 25, 1970, in Chervonohrad, Lviv Oblast, Ukrainian SSR) is a Ukrainian film director, screenwriter and film producer of documentaries and feature films. He is a member of the National Union of Cinematographers of Ukraine, and he is a 2018 winner of the Taras Shevchenko National Prize of Ukraine for a series of historical and documentary films about the Revolution of Dignity.

== Biography ==
Volodymyr was born on February 25, 1970, in Chervonohrad, Lviv region. After graduating from high school, Volodymyr entered the Chervonohrad Mining College in 1987. In 1989-1991, he served in the Soviet army in the naval aviation, and was stationed in Belarus.

Later, in 1992, he entered the Karpenko-Kary Kyiv State Institute of Theater Arts, Faculty of Directing. He graduated in 1997. He worked at the TV studios Studio 1+1, Danapris-Film, and was the director of the quite famous at the time program SV-Show with Verka Serdiuchka.

He started his career as a director of TV movies and TV series. Later, he changed his focus to documentaries and eventually moved on to making feature films. In most of his films, he is the director and screenwriter of his own films. The only exception is the film The Seventh Route (1997), where Tychyi acted only as a co-author of the script."

He is one of the creators of the film projects "Assholes. Arabesques", "Ukraine, Goodbye!", and "Babylon'13". In 2018, he was one of the winners of the Taras Shevchenko National Prize of Ukraine for his series of historical documentaries about the Revolution of Dignity.

== Personal life ==
In 1996 he married his classmate Yulia Shashkova. The couple has two children: daughter Anya (born in 1996) and son Timothy (born in 2002).
