= Bad Roads =

2020 Ukrainian drama film

- Russian: Плохие дороги
- Directed by: Nataliia Vorozhbyt
- Produced by: Dmytro Minzianov, Yurii Minzianov
- Starring: Zoya Baranovska; Maryna Klimova; Anna Zhuravska; Ihor Koltovskyy; Andriy Lelyukh
- Production company: Kristi Films
- Release dates: 3 September 2020 (Venice); 20 May 2021 (Ukraine)
- Running time: 105 minutes
- Country: Ukraine
- Language: Russian

Ukrainian actor Ihor Koltovskyi at a screening of the film organized as part of the National Tour "Cinema for Victory!"

Bad Roads (Russian: «Плохие дороги», romanized: Plokhiye dorogi, Ukrainian: «Погані дороги», romanized: Pohani dorohy) is a Ukrainian-Russian-language Ukrainian drama film directed by Nataliia Vorozhbyt and released in 2020. Its world premiere took place on 3 September 2020 at the 35th Venice International Critics' Week, where it was screened in competition. In September 2021 it was selected as the Ukrainian entry for the Best International Feature Film at the 94th Academy Awards.

== Plot ==
Four short stories are set along the roads of Donbas during the war. There are no safe spaces and no one can make sense of what is going on. Even as they are trapped in the chaos, some manage to wield authority over others. But in this world, where tomorrow may never come, not everyone is defenseless and miserable. Even the most innocent victims may have their turn at taking charge.

== Cast ==
Film's top cast:

- Zoya Baranovska as young woman
- Maryna Klimova as journalist
- Anna Zhuravska as young girl
- Ihor Koltovskyy as school principal
- Andriy Lelyukh as commander

== Reception ==
Bad Roads has an approval rating of 91% on review aggregator website Rotten Tomatoes, based on 11 reviews, and an average rating of 7.6/10. Metacritic assigned the film a weighted average score of 66 out of 100, based on critics, indicating "generally favorable reviews".

== See also ==
- List of submissions to the 94th Academy Awards for Best International Feature Film
- List of Ukrainian submissions for the Academy Award for Best International Feature Film
