= Hotsunlight =

2021 Russian film

- Солнцепёк
- Directed by: Maksim Brius; Mikhail Vasserbaum
- Written by: Vladimir Izmailov
- Produced by: Sergey Shcheglov
- Starring: Alexander Bukharov; Marina Denisova; Gleb Borisov; Maksim Dakhnenko; Aleksei Kravchenko; Vladimir Ilyin
- Release date: 11 August 2021
- Running time: 133 min
- Country: Russia
- Language: Russian

Hotsunlight (Russian: Солнцепёк, romanized: Solntsepyok) is a 2021 Russian propaganda war film directed by Maksim Brius and Mikhail Vasserbaum. Set during the early stages of the War in Donbas, the film portrays the conflict in eastern Ukraine from a pro-Russian perspective and depicts the Wagner Group intervening on behalf of pro-Russian separatists. Media reports stated that the film was financed by Russian businessman Yevgeny Prigozhin.

== Plot ==
Set in May and June 2014 in Luhansk Oblast, Ukraine, the film follows Vladislav Novozhilov, a veteran of the Soviet–Afghan War, as he attempts to evacuate his family from the conflict zone amid the outbreak of the war in Donbas. After becoming separated from them, he arrives in Luhansk, where his former comrade Pavel Gritsai, now a separatist commander, helps him secure work as an ambulance driver.

Throughout the film, Ukrainian forces are portrayed as indiscriminately shelling civilian areas in Luhansk Oblast. After Novozhilov's family and Gritsai's parents are killed in one such attack, Novozhilov joins the separatist forces. In the film's climax, Wagner Group fighters arrive and destroy a Ukrainian armored column before transferring the captured equipment to separatist fighters.

== Cast ==
- Alexander Bukharov as Vladislav Novozhilov
- Marina Denisova as Nina
- Gleb Borisov as Ilya
- Maksim Dakhnenko as Alexey Goncharenko
- Aleksei Kravchenko as Pavel Gritsai
- Vladimir Ilyin as David Gurevich
- Svetlana Terentyeva as Olga
- Andrey Terentyev as Zhenya
- Gleb Temnov as "Seventh"
- Sergey Garusov as "Pamir"
- Alexey Rumyantsev as "Shmel"
- Sergey Vorobyov as "Yenisey"
- Gennady Yakovlev as "Shulga"
- Vyacheslav Zemlyanoy as Sergey Grigoryevich, Gritsai's father
- Nadezhda Shumilova as Vera Vasilyevna, Gritsai's mother
- Yevgeny Kuzmin as Igor Burov
- Yevgeny Yegorov as Grits Stepanchuk
- Alexander Solonenko as Ukrainian General Glugovski

== Production and release ==
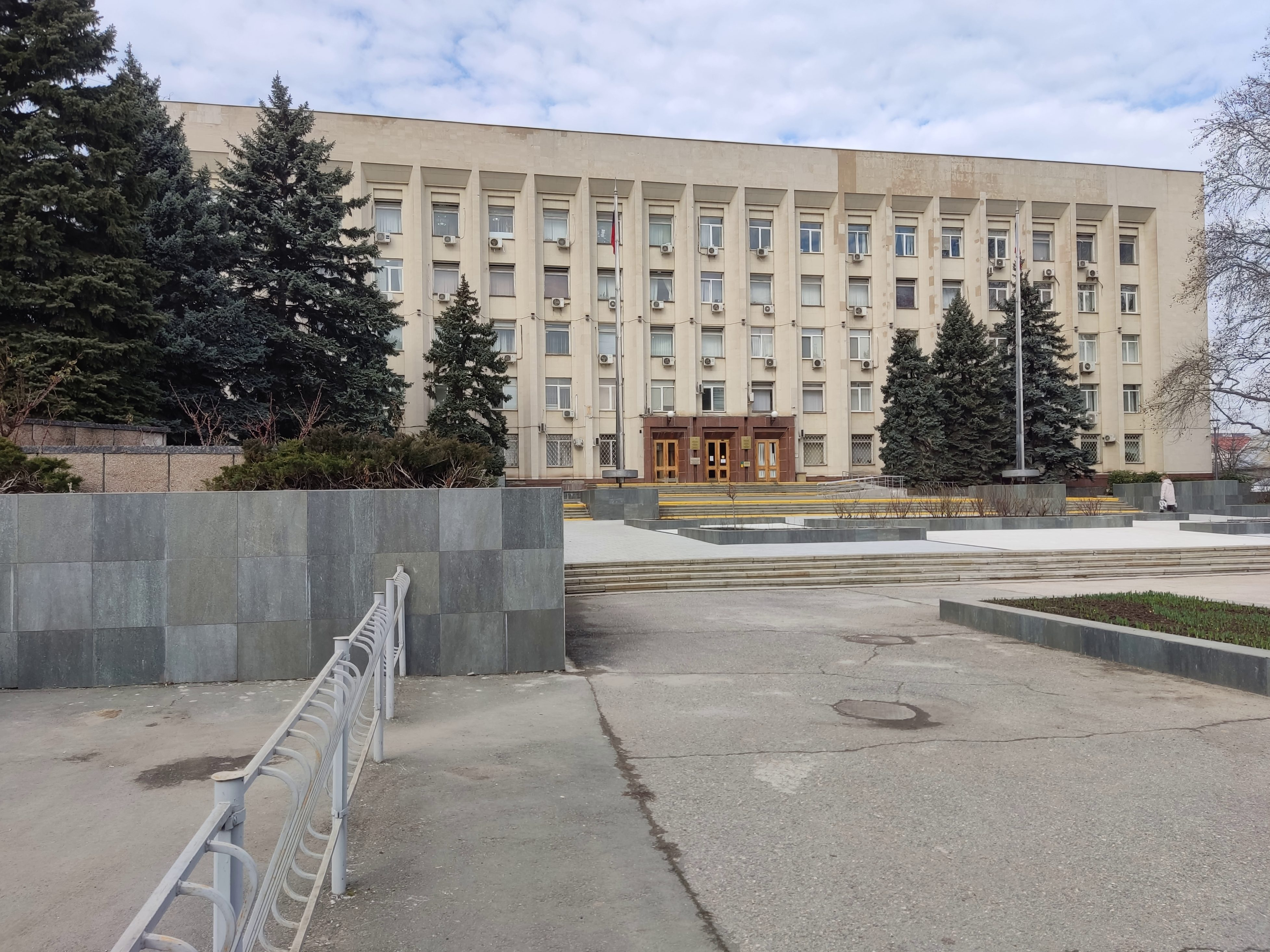
The building of the Simferopol Municipality served as the administration building

Filming took place in Yevpatoria and Simferopol in Crimea. The building of the Simferopol Municipality was used as a filming location for scenes depicting an administrative building.

The film was produced by Paritet-Film and Aurus. Several media outlets reported that it was financed by Yevgeny Prigozhin, although his involvement was not officially acknowledged during production.

Hotsunlight premiered in Saint Petersburg on 11 August 2021 and was later broadcast on Russian television channel NTV on 18 August 2021.

In April 2022, the Ministry of Culture of Kyrgyzstan banned screenings of Hotsunlight, along with the Russian films Donbass. Borderland and Opolchenochka, citing the international situation and Kyrgyzstan's neutral position regarding the Russian invasion of Ukraine.

== Reception ==
The film received mixed reviews in Russian media. Dmitry Sosnovsky of Rossiyskaya Gazeta praised the film as a "heart-rending" and unflinching depiction of war. Maksim Voronov of Regnum positively reviewed the film's emotional intensity but criticized its ending as weak and disconnected from the rest of the narrative.

Other commentators criticized the film as propaganda. Film critic Victor Matizen described it as an example of militarist propaganda and argued that it manipulated facts in order to portray Ukraine as solely responsible for the bloodshed in Donbas. He also criticized the film's editing. Writer and journalist Dmitry Bykov called the film a "monstrous fake" and "total falsehood".

== See also ==
- Donbass (film)
