= The Forest Song =

1911/1918 play by Lesya Ukrainka

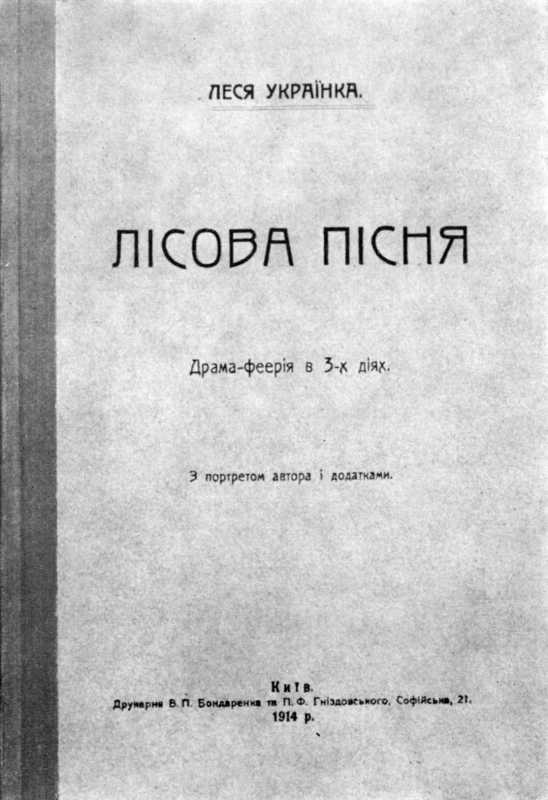
- 1914 edition cover
- Author: Lesya Ukrainka
- Original title: Лісова пісня
- Translators: Tarnawsky, Maxim; Cundy, Percival
- Language: Ukrainian
- Genre: Féerie
- Published: 1912
- Publisher: Shevchenko Scientific Society (in Ukrainian); Bookman Associates (in English) (Note: THE ELECTRONIC LIBRARY OF UKRAINIAN LITERATURE: An Internet Collection of Freely Accessible Literary Texts)
- Publication place: Russian Empire; USA
- English publication date: 1950

The Forest Song (Ukrainian: «Лісова пісня», romanized: Lisova pisnya, ALA-LC romanization: Lisova pisni︠a︡) is a poetic play in three acts by Lesya Ukrainka. The play was written in 1911 in the city of Kutaisi, and was first staged on 22 November 1918 at the Kyiv Drama Theater. The work is one of the first prototypes of fantasy in Ukrainian literature.

== History of creation ==
The play is based on folk songs, legends and other material gathered by Lesya Ukrainka during a trip around Kovel povit, which she undertook in summer of 1893 together with her mother, ethnographer Olena Pchilka.

The draft of the poetic play was written in the summer of 1911 in Kutaisi. The final revision and editing of it lasted until October. In a letter to her sister Olha, dated 27 November 1911, Lesya Ukrainka mentioned her hard work on the drama "Forest Song":

I wrote it during a very short period of time, 10–12 days, and I could not help writing. My mood was invincible, but after it I was sick and devastated… Then I started rewriting it, and I did not think that would take far more time than the writing itself, – just yesterday I finished this hassle and now my neck and shoulders ache as if I were carrying sacks.

In a letter to her mother, dated 2 January 1912, Lesya Ukrainka mentioned what had inspired her to write the play:

It seems to me, that I just remembered our forests and longed for them. And then I have always kept that Mavka in my mind, for a long time, ever since you told me something about Mavkas in Zhaborytsia when we were walking through a forest with small but very dense trees. Then in Kolodyazhne, on a moonlit night, I ran into the woods alone (you didn't know that) and there I waited for Mavka to appear. And over Nechimne, I imagined her, as we spent the night there — you remember — with my uncle Lev Skulinsky. Apparently, I already had to write it once, and now for some reason, the 'right time' has come — I myself do not understand why. I am fascinated by this image forever.

Numerous alterations and additions to the original draft of the manuscript demonstrate Lesya Ukrainka's hard and persistent work on it. The autograph consists of several text layers and reflects the various stages of its creation — from the initial to the final one.

The outline of the first Act is the most interesting. Sometimes it resembles a detailed plan, that includes the content of each individual scene and combines poetic text with prose, demonstrating the work of the writer's imagination.

== Plot ==
Fairy Drama in Three Acts

Prologue

Old forest in Volyn, a wild and mysterious place. The beginning of spring. "He who rends the dikes" runs out of the forest. He talks to the Lost Babes and Rusalka, who reminds him of his love, reproaches him for betrayal. Water Goblin argues with Rusalka that she is dating a deceitful stranger. He only tempts Mermaids.

Act One

Uncle Lev and his nephew Lukash are going to build a house in the same area. Lev is an old man, kind. Lukash is still a young man. The old man tells the boy that he should be careful with the forest dwellers. The Forest Elf tells Rusalka that Lev will not offend them.

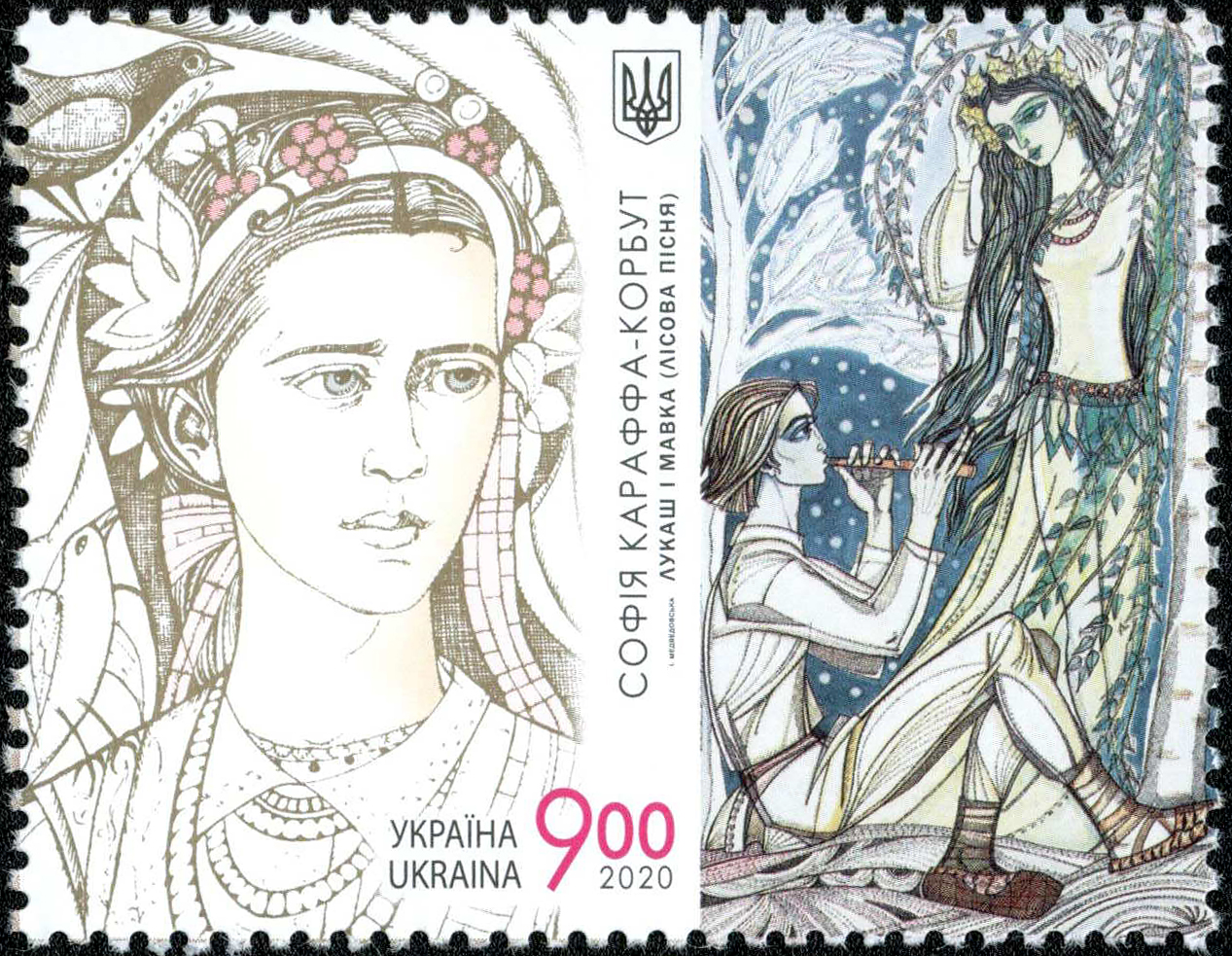
2020 stamp featuring Lesya Ukrainka, and the Forest Song character Lukash playing a flute for Mavka

Lukash makes a flute out of reeds, which is heard by Mavka, who previously talked to Forest Elf. Forest Elf warned the girl to avoid people, because they were only a disaster.

When Lukash is going to cut a birch with a knife, Mavka stops him and asks not to offend his sister. Lukash is surprised to have met such an unusually lush and beautiful young lady in the forest and asks who she is. Her name is Forest Mavka.

Lukash likes the girl for her changeable beauty, kind language, sensitivity to music and beauty. He says that people mate with each other when they love.

The boy also tells Mavka that they are going to build a house in the forest.

Mavka and Lukash fall in love with each other.

Act Two

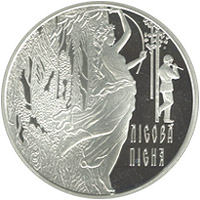
The image of Lukash and Mavka on the reverse of the silver jubilee coin of the NBU.

Late summer, a house has already been built on the lawn, a garden has been planted. Lukash's mother scolds him for wasting time playing the flute. She shouts at Mavka, calling her useless and sloven. She reproaches her for her clothes and sends her to harvest wheat. But Mavka can't reap wheat, because it speaks to her.

Lukash explains to Mavka that his mother needs a daughter-in-law who would work in the fields and at home. Mavka tries to understand all these laws with her loving heart, but such small worries are alien to her, she lives in the world of beauty.

Widow Kylyna comes to the house. She takes a sickle from Mavka and begins to reap. She jokes with Lukash and then goes to the house. His mother kindly accepts her. Lukash accompanies Kylyna to the village.

Mavka suffers, and the Mermaid soothes her but warns against love, which can ruin a free soul. Lisovyk warns Mavka. He asks her to remember her freedom, the beauty of nature, and to free herself from the shackles of human love.

Mavka is going to become a forest princess again. She dresses in a crimson, silver haze. Perelesnyk begins to court her. They start dancing. But there comes Marishte, who wants to take Mavka away. She shouts that she is still alive.

Lukash treats Mavka rudely and shouts to his mother that he wants to send elders to Kylyna. Suffering from grief, Mavka goes to Marishte herself.

Act Three

On a cloudy autumn night, the figure of Mavka hangs out near Lukash's house. Lisovyk emerges from the forest. He explains that he ordered to turn Lukash into a werewolf. But Mavka hopes to turn him into a man by the power of her love. Lukash is scared of Mavka, runs away from her.

Kutz says that there is poverty in the Lukash's family, the mother-in-law, and the daughter-in-law are constantly arguing.

Mavka turns into a dry willow, from which Kylyna's boy cuts a flute. Flute says in Mavka's voice: "How sweet it plays, how deep it cuts, it cuts my chest, it takes my heart out…"

Kylyna wants to cut down a willow, but Perelesnyk saves her.

Kylyna asks her husband to return to the village. Lost Destiny comes, pointing to the flute. Lukash gave Mavka her soul but deprived her of her body. But she does not grieve for her body, her love is now eternal.

Mavka's last monologue, where she addresses Lukash is the culmination of the Act.

Lukash starts playing. Mavka flares up with her beauty, and he rushes to her. But she disappears. It's snowing. Lukash freezes with a smile on his face.

== Characters ==
=== Main characters ===
- Mavka
- Lukash

=== Minor characters ===
- Uncle Lev
- Mother of Lukash
- Kylyna
- Children of Kylyna
- Boy (Kylyna's son)

=== Mythical characters ===
- Will-o'-the-wisp
- He who dwells in rock (phantom signifying death and oblivion)
- He who rends the dikes (destructive sprite dwelling in the freshets of spring)
- Water Goblin (Vodianyk)
- Field Sprite (nymph dwelling among the grain)
- Rusalka
- Lost Babes (Water nixies)
- Kutz (Malicious imp)
- Starvelings (based on Percival Cundy translation)
- Fate (phantom — based on Percival Cundy translation)
- Forest Elf (based on Percival Cundy translation)
- Marishte

== Theater adaptations ==
- Mavka: (unfinished) based on Lesya Ukrainka's Forest Song, an opera by Stefania Turkewich, date unknown.
- Forest Song: a ballet by Ukrainian composer Mykhailo Skorulsky created in 1936. It was first staged in 1946 in Kyiv.
- Forest Song: an opera by Ukrainian composer Vitaliy Kyreiko (1957). Premieres in Lviv and the opera studio of the Kyiv Conservatory.
- Forest Song: a ballet by composer Herman Zhukovsky (libretto by M. Gabovych, directed by O. Tarasov and O. Lapauri) at the Bolshoi Theater of the USSR — 1961.
- Forest Song: an opera by Ukrainian composer Myroslav Volynsky. Premiere in Kamianets-Podilskyi at the Opera in Miniature Festival.
- Forest Song: the play based on Percival Cundy's translation of the drama, performed by the Students` Theatre of the Applied Linguistics Department at the Lesya Ukrainka Volyn National University.

== Screen adaptations ==
Year	Title	Director	Mavka	Lukash	Film studio	Notes
1961	Forest Song	Viktor Ivchenko	Rayisa Nedashkivska	Vladimir Sidorchuk	Dovzhenko Film Studios	
1976	Forest Song	Alla Hrachova	Halyna Ostapenko	Borys Romanov	Kievnauchfilm	Short animated film, (Ukrainian animation)
1980	Forest Song. Mavka	Yuri Ilyenko	Lyudmyla Yefymenko	Victor Kremliov	Dovzhenko Film Studios	
2023	Mavka: The Forest Song	Oleksandra Ruban and Oleh Malamuzh	Natalka Denysenko	Artem Pyvovarov	Animagrad	Animated film (Ukrainian animation)
2026	Mavka: The True Myth	Katia Tsaryk	Arina Bocharova	Ivan Dovzhenko	Film.UA	Live action film

== Game adaptations ==
- The Forest Song: American video game.

== See also ==
- History of Ukrainian literature
- Kutaisi
- Ukrainian literature
