= Khrystyna Soloviy =

Ukrainian-Lemko folk singer (born 1993)

Khrystyna Soloviy Христина Соловій
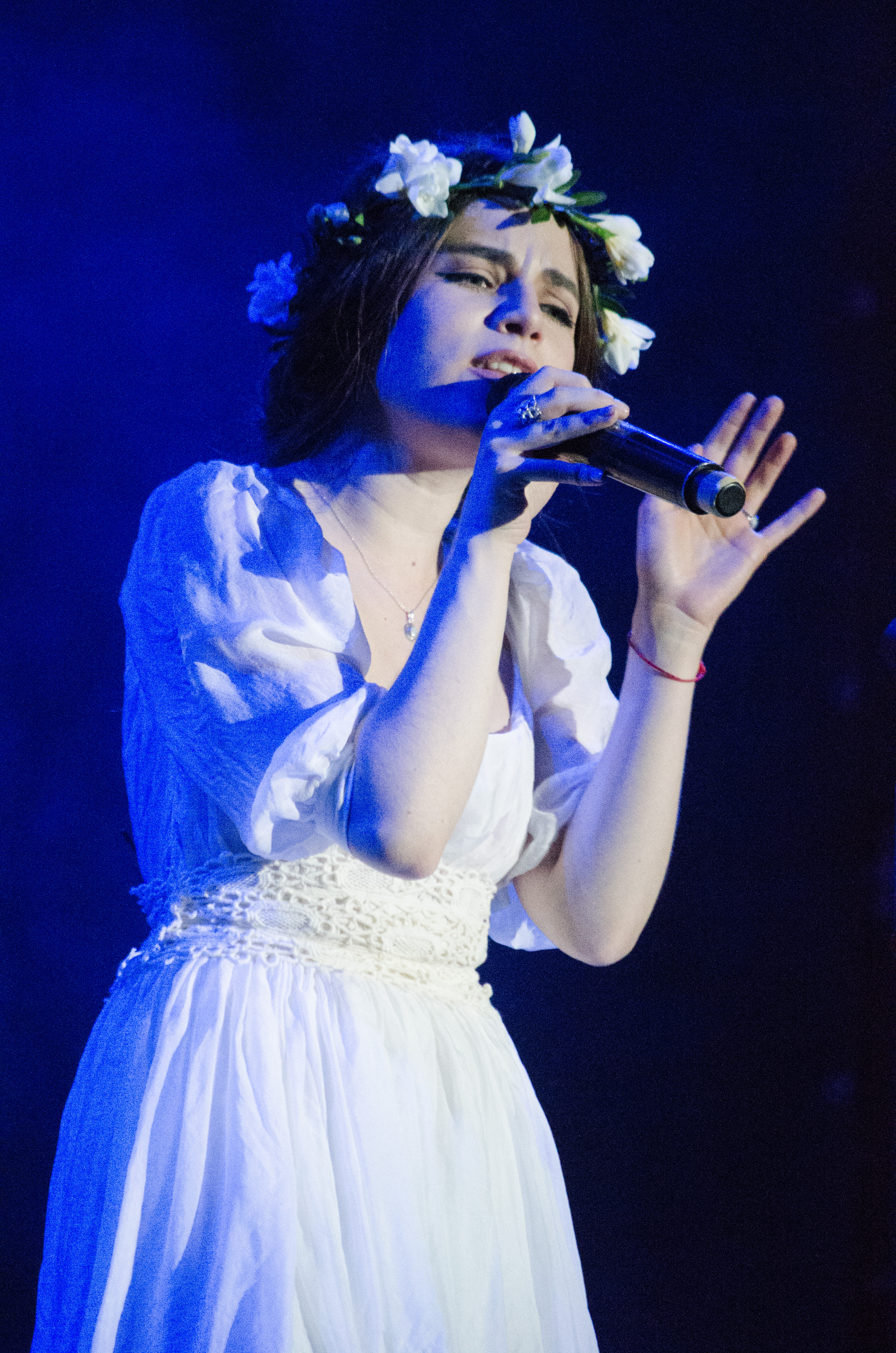
- Soloviy in 2016

Background information
- Born: 17 January 1993 (age 33); Drohobych, Lviv Oblast, Ukraine
- Genres: Folk, pop, rock
- Occupation: Singer-songwriter
- Years active: 2013–present

Khrystyna Ivanivna Soloviy (Note: Also transliterated as Solovii) (Ukrainian: Христи́на Іва́нівна Солові́й; born 17 January 1993) is a Ukrainian singer-songwriter. Being of partial Lemko descent, she is known for modern rearrangements of Ukrainian folk music and original songwriting. Soloviy was nominated by YUNA two times, being the first artist whose production was carried out by Sviatoslav Vakarchuk.

Positioning herself as one of the new generation of Ukrainian artists inspired by the Revolution of Dignity, she released her debut album Zhyva Voda containing traditional Ukrainian Lemko songs, combining folk melodies with contemporary sound. Forbes listed Khrystyna Soloviy as one of the "30 Most Promising Ukrainians Under 30" in 2022.

== Early life and education ==
Khrystyna Ivanivna Soloviy was born on 17 January 1993 in Drohobych to a musical family. Her mother taught choir at the Drohobych Music School. Solviy's grandmother was the head of a bandurist ensemble. She sang Galician songs to her grandchildren and told them Ukrainian fairy tales.

In 2011, Soloviy graduated from music school, having studied piano. Of partial Lemko descent, she sang in a Lemko choir for three years after her family moved to Lviv. She performed at the Lemkivska Vatra festival with the choir.

Soloviy also completed a program in philology at the Ivan Franko National University of Lviv.

== Career ==
=== 2013–2014: Debut on Holos Krayiny and career beginnings ===
In 2013, Soloviy performed the Lemko song "Gore dolom hozhu" in a blind audition for Holos Krayiny, the Ukrainian version of The Voice. She joined Svyatoslav Vakarchuk's team, and sang primarily Ukrainian folk songs. She reached the semifinals of the contest. She said she would never sing Russian pop music and would have refused to participate in the contest if she had been selected by any judges who sang in Russian. The support she received after her first broadcast solidified Soloviy's decision to pursue a musical career.

Although Soloviy did not win Holos Krayiny, she began a music career with Vakarchuk as her producer.

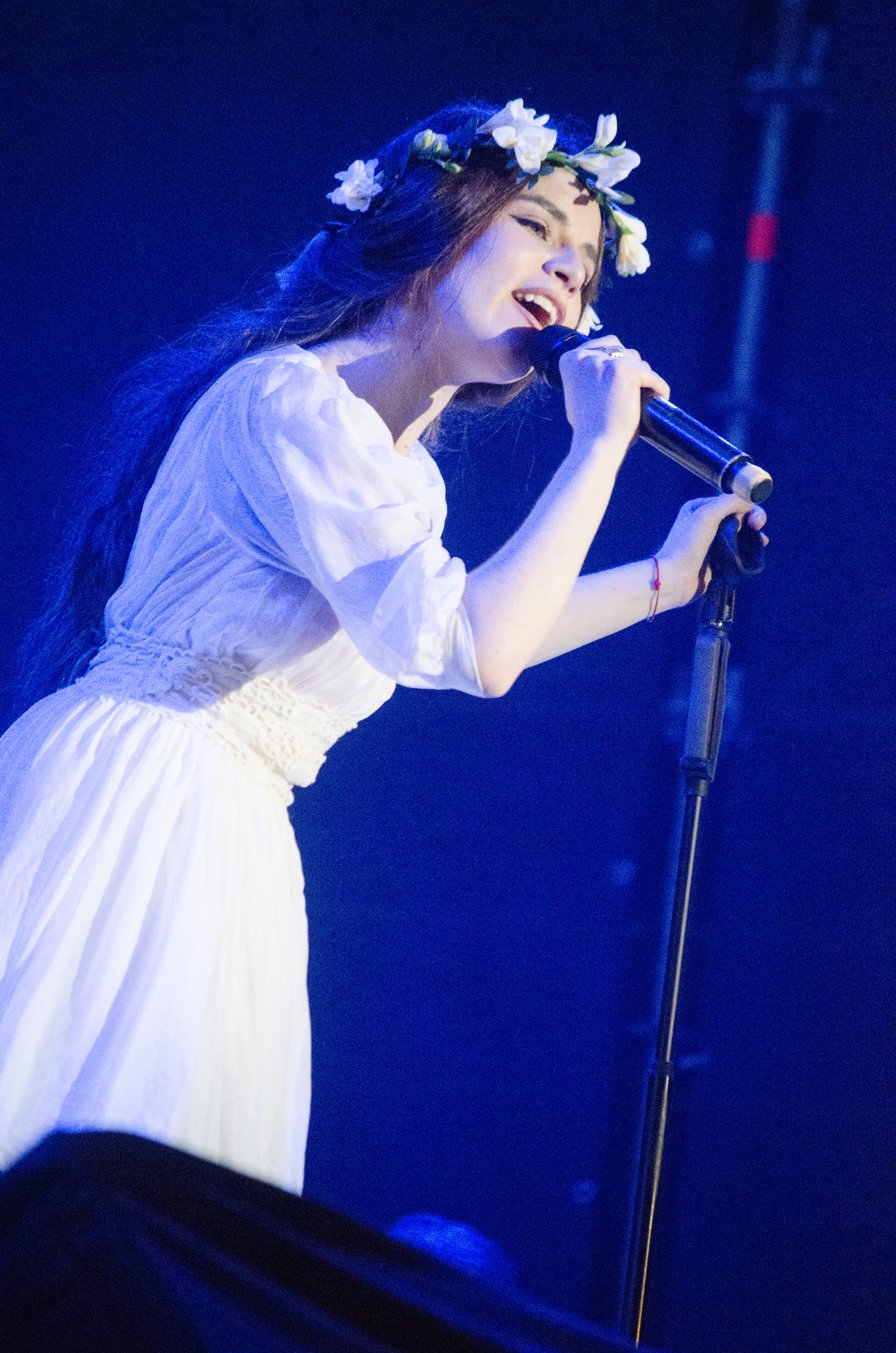
Soloviy in 2016

=== 2015–2017: Zhyva voda, "Trymai", and "Khto yak ne ty" ===
On 22 September 2015, she announced her debut album, Zhyva voda (Ukrainian: Жива вода, lit. 'Living water'), at the Gogolfest festival. It included 12 songs, two of which were written by Soloviy. The remaining ten were Lemko folk songs with compositions by Vakarchuk. The album immediately entered the TOP-12 best Ukrainian albums of 2015.

On 9 April 2015, Soloviy released a music video for the song "Trymai". As of March 2025, the song had 65 million views on YouTube. On 22 October of the same year her second music video "Pod oblachkom" was released, which had 11 million views by March 2025. In 2015, Radio Aristocrats designated Soloviy as Startup of the Year in the Culture and Music category, and in 2016 her "Trymai" music video was nominated for Best Video Clip by the Yearly Ukrainian National Awards (YUNA). She also performed the song at the awards ceremony.

Soloviy released her first single "Khto, yak ne ty?" on 1 December 2016. Her second single "Fortepiano" was released on 21 December 2017.

=== 2018–2020: Lyubyi Druh, "Fortepiano", and "Shkidlyva Zvychka" ===
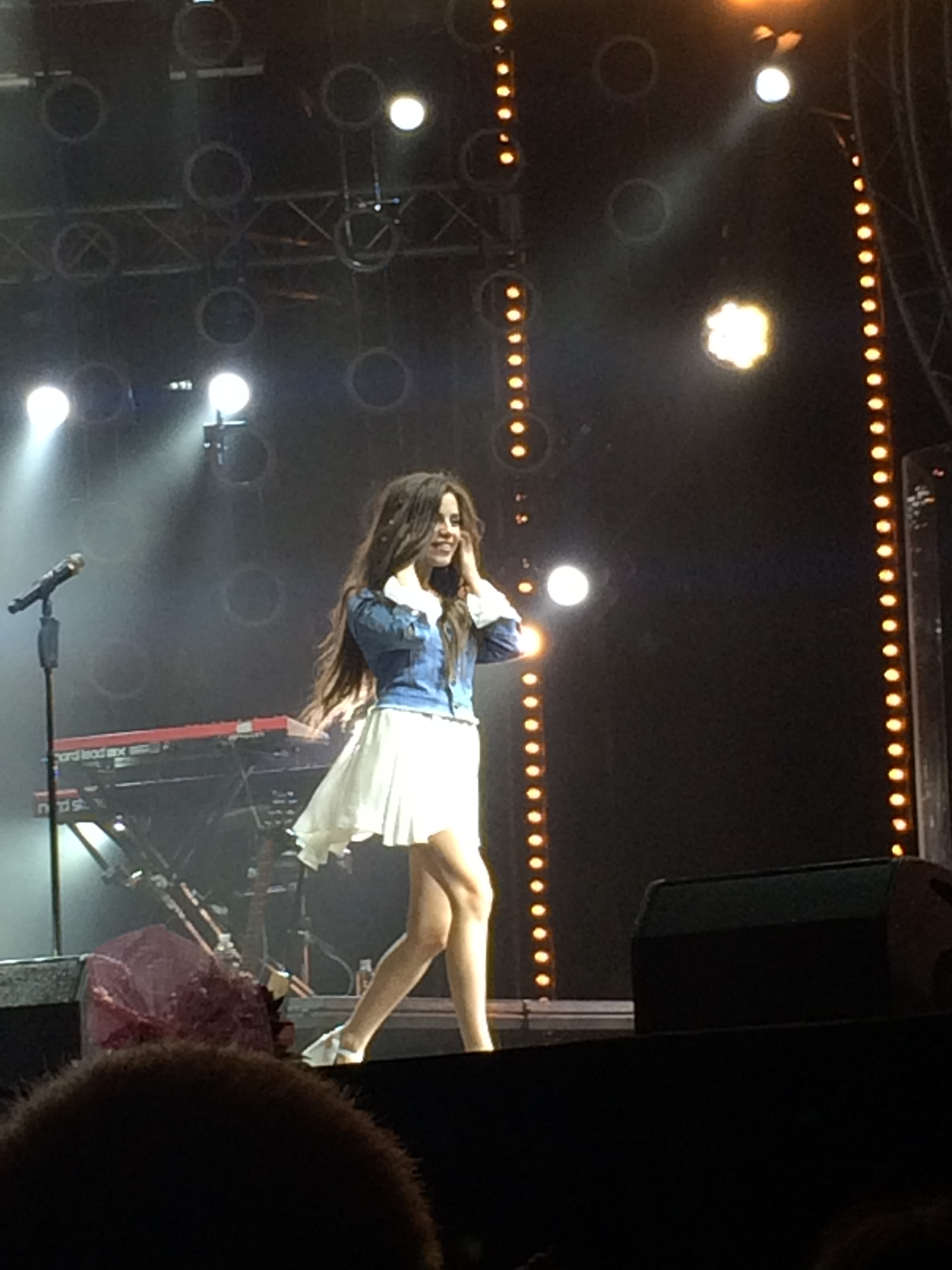
Khsrystyna Soloviy performing in the Atlas Weekend in 2018

Soloviy released another single titled "Shkidlyva Zvychka" on 10 October 2018.

Her second album, Liubyi Druh (Ukrainian: Любий друг, lit. 'Dear friend'), was released on 26 October 2018. 11 of the 12 were original songs by Soloviy, and "Ochenka moi chorni" was a folk composition. The album combined live music with electronics. Mylos Yelych, Pavlo Lytvynenko, and Oleksiy Saranchyn served as record producers.

The same year, her lyrical composition "Stezhechka" was selected for the soundtrack of the Ukrainian historical action film Kruty 1918. The music video, which was released on 22 January 2018, included footage from the film and other scenes shot separately with Soloviy. Oleksiy Shaparev directed both the film and the music video. Film producer Andrii Korniienko stated that in a male-centered story, they needed a female voice to strengthen the dramatic narrative. Allegedly, they consulted Soloviy because they considered her to be the soul of the modern Ukrainian music.

In 2019, Soloviy was nominated for Best Female Performer at the YUNA Music Awards for the second time.

=== 2021–2022: Rosa Ventorum and "Bella Ciao" ===
After a break from the spotlight, Soloviy released the single "Yunist" which was later included in the third part of the album Rosa Ventorum. Serhiy Zhadan played a main role in the music video for the song.

My song is about the fact that Ukrainian culture is super sexy, and you want it not because you have been taught patriotism or something, but because it is strong and seductive.

— Khrystyna Soloviy

On 28 May 2021, Soloviy released the first part of her third studio album Rosa Ventorum I. She said the name of the album, which means "wind rose" in Latin, was chosen by chance during a photo shoot. Soloviy planned Rosa Ventorum to include four parts, with one EP for each of the four corners of the world. The first EP included four songs along with their respective instrumental versions, for a total of eight tracks.

Rosa Ventorum I was followed by Rosa Ventorum II. This second EP was released on 12 November 2021. It included four tracks.

On 15 March 2022, following the Russian invasion of Ukraine, Soloviy sang an adaptation of Bella Ciao, an Italian anti-fascist folk song. It was translated and adapted to focus on the Russian invasion and occupation of Ukraine.

=== 2023: Mavka: The Forest Song and "Sertse" church controversy ===
==== Mavka: The Forest Song ====
In March 2023, Soloviy wrote three songs for a 3D animated Ukrainian fantasy film Mavka: The Forest Song. Soloviy described it as an opportunity to be involved with a project inspired by Lesya Ukrainka's The Forest Song, one of her favorite works since childhood, and Mavka, her favorite figure in Ukrainian mythology.

Also in 2023, Soloviy released Rizdvianii sny, a holiday mini-album containing four tracks, one of which consists of two poems by Bohdan Ihor Antonych.

==== "Sertse" church controversy ====
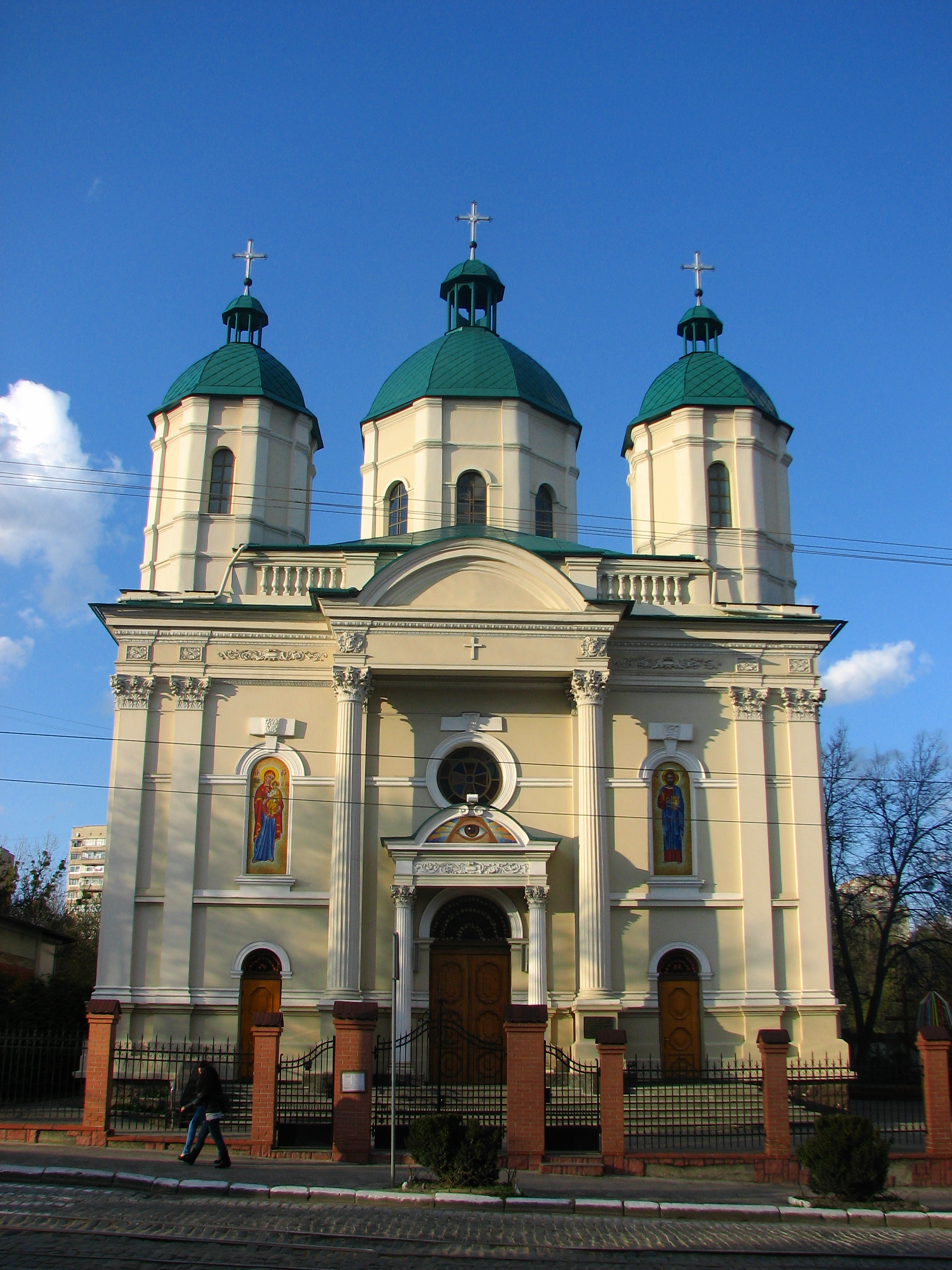
Church of St. Andrew in Lviv

On 20 October 2023, Soloviy collaborated with the band Zhadan i Sobaky to create a music video for "Sertse" (Ukrainian: Серце, lit. 'Heart'). The music video was filmed in Lviv, and featured a scene with two women kissing outside the Church of St. Andrew.

Before the song was released, Soloviy and Zhadan discussed the upcoming music video on the show 20-23. They said they expected it to cause uproar, but that no sacrilege was intended in the work.

After it was released, priests of the church described it as anti-Christian propaganda and asked for the video to be taken down. Parish representatives published an appeal on their Facebook page, which was later deleted. A priest from the Lviv Archdiocese recorded a video addressed to Soloviy and Zhadan, where he said the performance contradicted Christian morality.

Later in an interview with Masha Efrosynina, Soloviy said she did not regret anything about the incident. She stated she believed that one day the church would change its opinion but that she did not expect it in the near future. She said, "We [in Ukraine] have a problem with critical thinking. No matter how much you explain, no matter how much context you give, you will not be able to oppose their beliefs." She also said she considered the public outrage from Greek Catholics to be "free PR."

She received support from openly gay soldier Viktor Pylypenko, who organized another massive same-sex kissing in front of the church in a show of solidarity with Soloviy and the suspended rector.

=== 2024–present: Rosa Venturum III, copyright issue, and obscenity acquittal ===
In 2024 Soloviy released two singles "Kamerton", "Kucheryky", and the third part Rosa Venturum III.

On 11 January 2024, her song "Trymai" was translated into Russian with minor lyric adjustments for use in Tatyana Navka's ice dancing performance. Navka is the wife of Vladimir Putin's press secretary Dmitry Peskov. Soloviy appealed for help in identifying those responsible for the show, emphasizing it was "not about the theft of one song but about appropriating the cultural heritage of Ukrainians."

On 26 July 2024 in Chornomorsk, Soloviy participated in the Vydelkafest festival, where she asked the audience about their feelings about the city's previous name. Chornomorsk was previously known as Illyichivsk, after Vladimir Ilyich Lenin. Soloviy then said the previous name was "complete bullshit." For this statement, she was charged with "petty hooliganism" and "obscene swearing in public places, insulting citizens and other similar actions that disturb public order, and peace of citizens." On 27 September 2024, a court found her not guilty of the crime of obscene swearing.

On 19 December 2024, Soloviy and Volodymyr Dantes released a duet titled "Divchyno myla", which premiered in concert on December 4th. It is a modern interpretation of the song "Pryletila lastivochka" by the Ukrainian band VIA Smerichka. On 28 April 2025, in collaboration with palindrom Soloviy released "Kholodna Krov". The music video for it was filmed on the Hrybovychi solid waste landfill in Lviv Oblast with support of the "Zelene misto" Lviv Municipal Enterprise. The filming was postponed several times due to weather.

On 26 September 2025, Soloviy released "Halitsiia", which was inspired by reflections on her own identity and by the Ukrainian female pop lyric trends of the 1990s. The music video contains numerous references to Iryna Bilyk's music videos and photoshoots. On 19 December 2025 Soloviy together with Bilyk released a Ukrainian cover and music video for the song "Fransua". Bilyk reportedly gave Khrystyna complete freedom to interpret the song. The music video for it was filmed at the Kyiv restaurant "Vavylon".

== Political activism ==
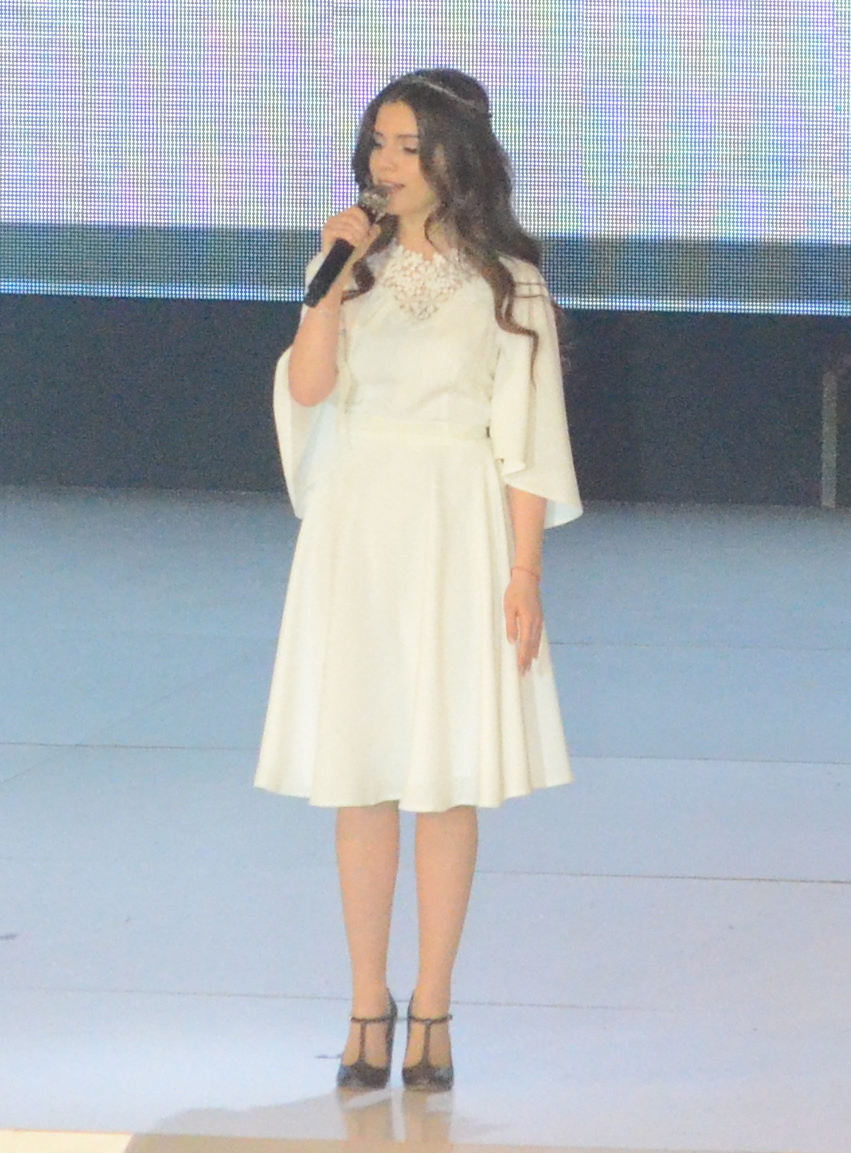
Soloviy performing for the Ukrainian Paralympic team in 2018

=== Animal rights ===
Soloviy was inspired by the animal activism of Brigitte Bardot. In 2018, Soloviy supported the humanitarian initiative "UAnimals" and appeared on the red carpet of the national film award "Zolota Dzyga" in a "Circus without animals" T-shirt.

=== Russo-Ukrainian war ===
In 2018, Soloviy joined the campaign in support of Ukrainian director Oleg Sentsov, who was arrested in Russia and sentenced to 20 years imprisonment on terrorism charges. The conviction was described as fabricated by Amnesty International and Human Rights Watch. He was ultimately released in 2019 during a prisoner swap.

With the beginning of the Russian invasion of Ukraine in 2022, Soloviy performed at concerts abroad. As of 27 August 2022, Forbes Ukraine estimated she had raised €106,000 for the Ukrainian Armed Forces.

Soloviy was in Lviv during the Russian missile attack on 6 July 2023. After the attack, she encouraged people to continue donating to the Ukrainian Armed Forces.

== Personal life ==
Soloviy grew up in a religious family. At one point she joined the Order of Saint Philomena, where she prayed 36 times a day. She shared in an interview that one day she "got so tired and thought, 'What if I don't pray?' And nothing happened." After living two years with her aunt who was a Jehovah's Witness, Soloviy became an atheist.

Soloviy was in a relationship with Serhiy Zhadan between 2022 and 2023. The relationship ended due to busy work schedules and Soloviy's romantic involvement with another man.

== Artistry ==
=== Influences ===
Soloviy has been influenced by the work of Ruslana, Maria Burmaka, Nina Matvienko and Ivan Franko. In her teenage years, she listened to Okean Elzy, Tina Karol, Queen, Eagles, Zemfira, the Rasmus and the Veryovka Ukrainian Folk Choir. Soloviy has mentioned that she is a devoted fan of Iryna Bilyk, frequently drawing inspiration from her and incorporating references to Bilyk’s songs into her own music.

=== Musical style ===
Ukrainian music critics have variously described her music as Ukrainian folk, folk-rock, pop, indie-pop, dream-pop, pop-rock, or the "pop-folk of the new generation." Soloviy considers her music to be a "frank alternative" to traditional Ukrainian pop music, as it features more electronics rather than the more common acoustic guitar.

== Awards ==
- In 2015, Radio Aristocrats awarded Soloviy as the Best Startup of the Year in the Culture and Music category.
- In 2016, at the YUNA Music Award for Discovery of the Year, her music video for “Trymai" received a nomination for Best Video Clip. She also performed the song at the award ceremony.
- In 2017, Soloviy received the Public's Choice Award at #Selektsiya from the Jem FM radio station.
- In 2018, she was included in the “100 Most Influential Women” and “100 Most Influential Ukrainians” of Focus magazine.
- In 2019, at the YUNA awards, Soloviy was nominated as "Best Female Performer" alongside Jamala, Nastya Kamenskykh, TAYANNA, and Olya Polyakova.

== Discography ==
=== Studio albums ===
- 2015 – Zhyva voda (Ukrainian: Жива вода, lit. 'Living water')
- 2018 – Liubyi druh (Любий друг, 'Dear friend')
- 2021 – Rosa Ventorum I

=== Extended plays ===
- 2021 – Rosa Ventorum II
- 2023 – Rizdvanyii sny
- 2023 – Rosa Ventorum III

=== Singles ===
- 2016 – "Khto yak ne ty?"
- 2017 – "Fortepiano"
- 2018 – "Shkidlyva Zvychka"
- 2018 – "Stezhechka"
- 2019 – "Kholodno" (cover)
- 2021 – "Vtikala"
- 2022 – "Ukraiinska liut" (Bella ciao adaptation)
- 2022 – "Ya tvoya zbroya"
- 2022 – "Yunist"
- 2023 – "Podzvonyty mami"
- 2024 – "Kamerton"
- 2024 – "Kucheryky"
- 2025 – "Halitsiia"

=== Collaborations ===
- 2021 – "Taksi" (featuring Kalush Orchestra)
- 2017 – "Bizhy tikay" (featuring Sasha Chemerov)
- 2023 – "Hobelen" (featuring Mertvyi Piven)
- 2023 – "Sertse" (featuring Zhadan i sobaky)
- 2024 – "Divchyno myla" (featuring Volodymyr Dantes)
- 2025 – "Kholodna Krov" (featuring palindrom)
- 2025 – "Fransua" (feautring Iryna Bilyk)

== Music videos ==
Year	Title	Director	Album
2015	Trymai	Maksym Ksionda	Zhyva voda
2015	Pod oblachkom	Yana Altukhova	Zhyva voda
2016	Khto, yak ne ty?	Andrii Boiar	Liubyi druh
2017	Fortepiano	Anna Buriachkova	Liubyi druh
2018	Shkidlyva Zvychka		Liubyi druh
2019	Stezhechka	Oleksii Shapariev	Liubyi druh
2020	Vtikala	DVIZHON	Rosa Ventorum I
2021	Osin'	Oleksandr Kulak	Rosa Ventorum II
2022	Ya tvoya zbroya	Yurii Katynskyi	
2022	Yunist'	Viktor Skuratovskyi	Rosa Venturum III
2023	Sertse	Serhiy Kotliarov	
