= Crossworld (disambiguation) =

Crossworld is a nondenominational Christian missionary organization.

Crossworld may also refer to:

- Crossworlds, a 1996 American science fiction film
- Crossworlds, former name of Mavka (band)
- Sonic Racing: CrossWorlds, a 2025 kart racing game in the Sonic the Hedgehog series

== See also ==
- Crossword, a type of word puzzle
