= Koberidze =

Koberidze' Georgian-language surname of patronymic type (suffux '-dze'). Notable people with the surname include:

- Alexandre Koberidze (born 1984), Georgian filmmaker and screenwriter
- Luka Koberidze (born 1994), Georgian footballer
- Otar Koberidze (1924–2015), Georgian actor, film director, and screenwriter
