= The Stolen Princess =

2018 Ukrainian animated fantasy film

- International theatrical release poster
- Directed by: Oleg Malamuzh
- Based on: Ruslan and Lyudmila by Aleksandr Pushkin
- Cinematography: Animagrad (Film.UA Group)
- Music by: Dario Vero
- Production companies: Animagrad Animation Studio; FILM.UA Group
- Distributed by: Ukrainian Film Distribution
- Release date: March 7, 2018 (Ukraine)
- Running time: 91 minutes
- Country: Ukraine
- Language: English / Ukrainian
- Budget: ₴95.2 million ($3.6 million)
- Box office: $6,5 million

The Stolen Princess (Ukrainian: «Викрадена принцеса: Руслан і Людмила», romanized: Vykradena pryntsesa: Ruslan i Lyudmyla, lit. 'The Stolen Princess: Ruslan and Lyudmila') is a 2018 Ukrainian 3D animated fantasy film directed by Oleg Malamuzh and based on the fairy tale Ruslan and Ludmila by Russian poet Aleksandr Pushkin. The film premiere in Ukraine took place on March 7, 2018.

The film tells about a wandering artist Ruslan who saves princess Mila kidnapped by evil sorcerer named Chornomor.

== Plot ==
Two sorcerers, Finn and Chornomor, have an intense magical duel in favor of saving Finn's beloved wife, Princess Nina. Finn gains the upper hand at first but is defeated by Chornomor, who deceives him by stepping on a "force field", and loses all of his magic powers and youth, which then transfers to Chornomor. Nina is transformed into a stone statue in exchange for her power of love as a source of his magic.

In the present day, Ruslan, a wandering artist who dreams of becoming a knight, is doing a small play written by an eccentric and an aspiring playwright, Lester, in which he plays the role of Finn and Chornomor. In the castle lives an adventurous and kind princess named Mila. She is bored with her life and her overprotective father, King Vladimir, who is forcing her to get married, despite her longing to explore the world and have adventures. One night, she sneaks out and is almost harassed by two gangsters, until Ruslan arrives. He saves Mila from the men and they escape. When the two are alone, Ruslan, afraid of being judged by his status, claims to be a knight.

The next day, they share romantic moments as they develop their feelings for each other, but Mila is soon kidnapped via a tornado by Chornomor. He tries to pursue Mila, but fails to do so and is knocked unconscious. When he regains consciousness, he is confronted by the king, who mistakenly accuses him of abducting his daughter. Ruslan tries to tell the truth, but none one believes him. Realizing Chornomor is real, he consults Lester and they set off to the cave where a wise cat lives. The cat tells Ruslan that every century Chornomor abducts a princess who is in love and uses the power of her love to replenish his magical powers. Many have set out to defeat him, but all have perished.

The two ask for help on where to find Mila and the cat reveals to them a magic vortex where they discover a magical place and he gives them a pea pod as a "gift". When they reach a cliff, a hamster suddenly steals the pod and they pursue it, but they realize that they are supposed to give it to him and unlock a bridge built from a dragon's skeleton.

Meanwhile, at Chornomor's castle, Mila awakens in a bed and encounters Chornomor, who informs her of his plans to turn her to stone once he has made use of her love for Ruslan. She tries to escape using the wizard's magical hat that makes the user invisible. Despite Chornomor casting a spell that makes all of the desserts in his castle come alive and attack Mila, she manages to defeat them. Whilst avoiding Chornomor, she discovers the other princesses who were kidnapped by him, and turned into stone.

When Ruslan and Lester arrive at the cave, they meet a strange old man who holds a staff similar to a wizard, and ask for help on where to find Finn, but the old man is revealed to be Finn. Due to him having no contact with the outside world for too long, he is too paranoid to communicate with. With the help of Ruslan's plan, they pretend to be "wizards" who are casting a "spell" to lure him down. Finn, believing that his powers are restored, tries to stop them. Ruslan and the gang pretend to be dead, only for them to contain Finn. When they get him, Ruslan asks where to find Chornomor and how to stop him. Finn tells them that his castle is made of spiky rocks and the source of his power is in his beard, and tells him that Ruslan needs a magic sword to cut his beard. After asking for the directions on where to find the sword, they locate it but it is guarded by an army of skeletons and the animated head of a giant. The giant challenges Ruslan in exchange for the armor and sword, but Ruslan manages to defeat all of them and they go to Chornomor's castle.

When they get to the castle, they split up to find Mila. Ruslan finds Mila in a different outfit and appearance and she tells him that she does not need rescuing, for she is happy at this place. This breaks Ruslan's heart. Feeling down, he slowly leaves the place. Suddenly, a giant monster attacks them. Lester tries to convince Ruslan to fight, but he's too heartbroken to do so. Their bird gets Mila's pendant and makes Ruslan realize that he is being deceived by Chornomor and he gains the courage to fight the monster.

After defeating the monster, they go to the place where Mila is kept and Ruslan and Chornomor, who transforms into a dragon, engage in an intense duel. Ruslan is defeated at first, but manages to incapacitate Chornomor by cutting his beard. Chornomor loses his powers and the stone statues and Finn turn back to normal. Ruslan tries to escape with Mila, but they are trapped in the force field the same way as Finn did before. Ruslan sacrifices himself by pushing Mila out of the trap, leaving him incapacitated. Mila and Lester tries to save him, but is interrupted by the three knights, resulting in Ruslan's soul being zapped from him and leaving him lifeless. Enraged, Mila fights the three knights and defeats them all (including Chornomor who is tied up).

Mila mourns for the apparent death of Ruslan and says that she loves him so much. A now-rejuvenated Finn appears and brings back Ruslan's life. The two reunite including Lester and Finn and Nina reunite as well. Ruslan confesses that he is not a real knight, but Mila accepts this. She tells him she still loves him no matter what and they share their first kiss. Finn conjures up a fireworks display, and they all live happily ever after.

During the credits, Ruslan and Mila are getting married and are now living a happy life.

== Cast ==
In Ukrainian version, the roles were dubbed by:

Actor	Role
Oleksiy Zavgorodniy	Ruslan
Nadya Dorofeeva	Lyudmila / Mila
Yevgen Malukha	Chornomor
Serhiy Prytula	Nestor Pechersky
Yuriy Gorbunov	The Cat
Oleg "Fahot" Mykhaylyuta	Fin
Mykola Boklan	Volodymyr, Kyiv King
Pupsi Kira	Kyiv girl Olesya
Dmytro Monatik	The Head
Arevik Arzumanova	Sphere
Oleksandr Usyk, Vasyl Virastyuk	Troyeschyna gangsters
Oleg Voloschenko, Roman Lutsk	Guards
Yevgen Gashenko	Farlaf
Egor Krutogolovov	Rogday
Oleksandr Berezhok	Ratmir
Masha Efrosinina	Naina

== Production ==
In January 2013, producer Egor Olesov informed about the development of Ruslan and Lyudmila project based on a fairy tale poem with the same title by Aleksandr Pushkin. That September, press service of FILM.UA Group revealed the start of film production, and later the protagonists and synopsis for Ruslan and Lyudmila were presented with the film itself announced as 2D animation; later, however, the concept changed, and a decision was made to create a 3D animated film.

Hollywood consultants helped with developing the characters. According to the authors of the film, Ruslan and Lyudmila was made in English and then dubbed in Ukrainian. As Olesov said, Hollywood celebrities were involved in English dubbing, and in Ukraine, popular local actors lent their voices to the film. For the international market, the film was given another title, The Stolen Princess.

The script and characters' stories were finalized by the end of 2015; animation of approved scenes was completed.

== Release ==
=== International distribution ===
The Stolen Princess became the first project in the line of theatrically animated premieres from Animagrad, which also includes Mavka: The Forest Song (2023), Snow Republic (currently in development), and Roksolana and Suleiman. According to the company director, Animagrad planned to release one animated feature per year, both for local Ukrainian and international distribution.

In February 2015 at the European film market during Berlin International Film Festival, the rights to film distribution were sold to Israel and South Korea; and in May 2016 at Marché du Film of Cannes International Film Festival, to France, French-speaking territories, Bulgaria, Iran, and Poland. By the end of 2016, the film was sold to China, Germany, Austria, Switzerland, Lithuania, Latvia, Estonia, North Africa, and the Middle East.

In March 2017 in Hong Kong, FILMART took place, which is an annual film and TV content market. The FILM.UA Group stand presented projects of Animagrad studio, including The Stolen Princess. On the penultimate day of the market, the scenes from the animated film were screened in Asia for the first time; the invitation to the premiere appeared on the cover of The Hollywood Reporter, and the screening itself was successful and gathered positive feedback from market participants. In early April, Cannes hosted MIPTV (Marché International des Programmes de Télévision), a major European market of audiovisual content. The stand of Ukrainian delegation presented, among others, The Stolen Princess film. On May 19 and 23, the biggest film market Marche du Film under the aegis of the 70th Cannes International Film Festival held market screenings of The Stolen Princess, which enjoyed considerable success: the project gathered countless positive reviews, and negotiations on rights sales for the new territories began.

Immediately after Ukrainian release, the theatrical release took place in Romania (March 16) and Turkey (March 23). During the first Romanian weekend, the film collected $165,066 in the box office and placed second after American film Tomb Raider (2018). The premiere box office of the Ukrainian film places it third among animated releases in Turkey in 2018.

As of April 13, The Stolen Princess was shown in the cinemas of Ukraine, Romania, Turkey, Croatia, Bosnia and Herzegovina, Bulgaria, Egypt, United Arab Emirates, Kuwait, Lebanon, Jordan, Qatar, Oman and Bahrain. In total, the rights to the animated film screening have been sold to more than 50 countries, including France, Germany, countries of the Middle East, Southern Africa, Asia, and Latin America. By November, Ukrainian media reported that the film had been shown in more than 40 countries with more than half a million viewers. The film was released to cinemas in China in early 2019.

=== Distribution in Ukraine ===
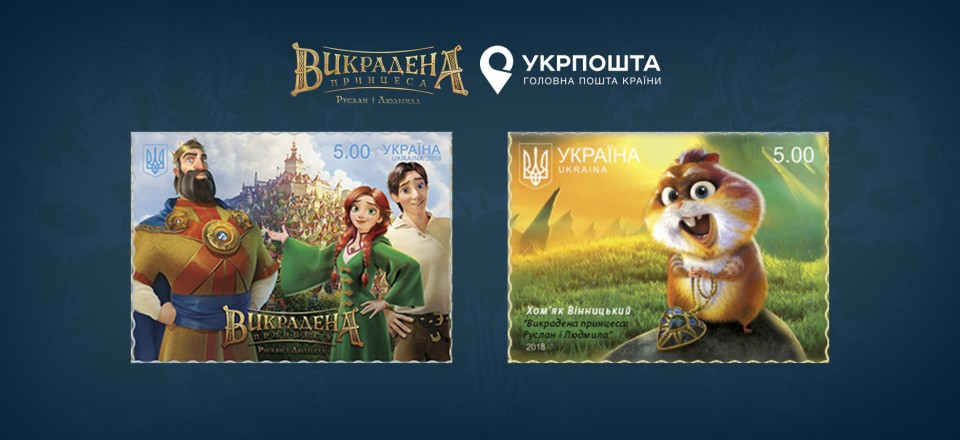
Postage stamps of Ukraine, 2018

For Ukrainian release, the title of Ruslan and Lyudmila was changed to The Stolen Princess (before that, the film producers already informed that they will use The Stolen Princess, not Ruslan and Lyudmila as the title for international distribution). The title was again changed to The Stolen Princess: Ruslan and Lyudmila, and was released on March 7, 2018.

== Soundtrack ==
The theme song of the film "Do zirok" ("To the Stars") was performed by Vremya i Steklo band. A music video for the song was presented. The author of the Ukrainian lyrics is Oleksandra Ruban, the arrangement to the song was made by Milos Jelic, keyboard player in Okean Elzy band, and the instrumental part was performed by the musicians of Kyiv Virtuosos orchestra.

List of track
No.	Title	Lyrics	Music	Length
1.	""Do zirok"" (Vremya i Steklo)	Oleksandra Ruban	Rafael Lake, Aaron Levy	3:13
2.	""Ty Lyubov Moya"" (Jamala)	Oleksandra Ruban	Robbie Nevil	4:05

The final song in the end credits to the feature film, "Ty Lyubov Moya" ("You're My Love"), was performed by Jamala.

== Box office ==
During the first weekend in Ukraine, the film collected ₴21 million ($0.8 million) in its box office. During five weekends, the film collected ₴35,857,041 and hit a record among films produced in Ukraine. The film came in top 5 of highest-earning Ukrainian films in the country.

== Reviews ==
The film got mixed reviews. The audience noted the lack of Ukrainian flavor and blind copying of Hollywood standards, inappropriate contemporary references, and lack of charisma among certain characters, but the reviewers have also praised high animation standards, clever jokes, and the animated feature film appealing to topics of interest to both adults and children.
