= 2017 in Moldova =

- Decades: 1990s; 2000s; 2010s; 2020s
- See also: Other events of 2017; Timeline of Moldovan history

Events in the year 2017 in Moldova.

== Incumbents ==
- President – Igor Dodon
- Prime Minister – Pavel Filip
- President of the Parliament – Andrian Candu

== Events ==
=== January ===
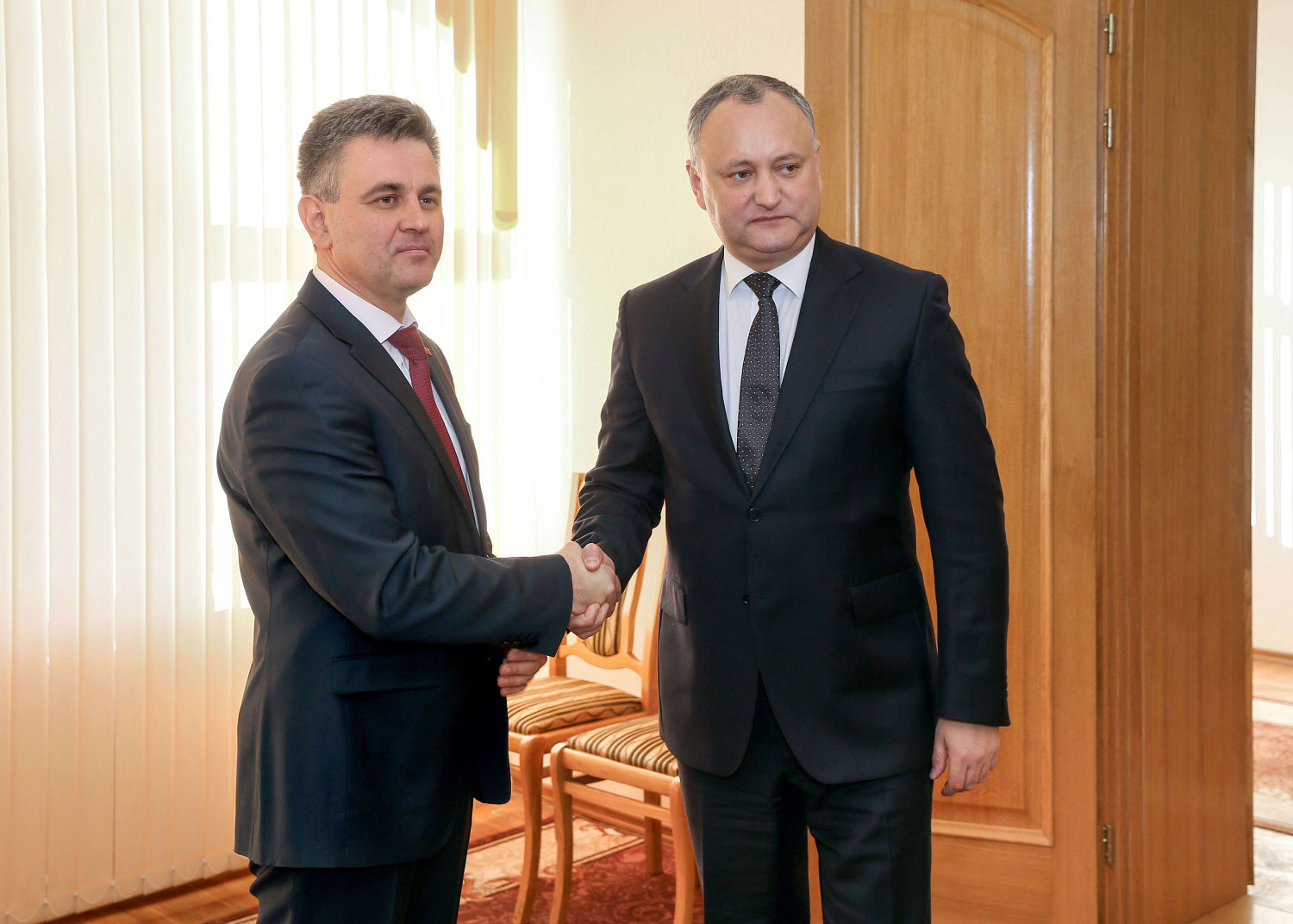
Moldovan President Igor Dodon with Transnistrian President Vadim Krasnoselsky during their meeting in Bender.

- 4 January - President Igor Dodon visited the city of Bender in the breakaway republic of Transnistria, making hin the first Moldovan leader to visit the region since 2009.

=== April ===
- 19 April - Moldova is granted observer Status in the Eurasian Economic Union in April 2017.

=== October ===
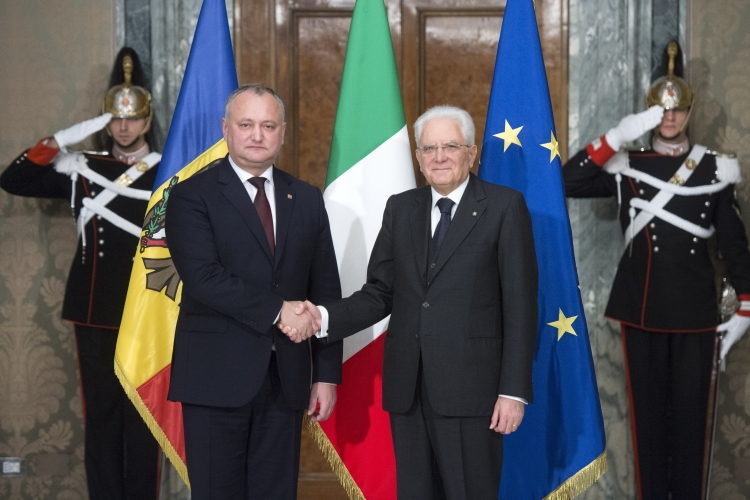
President Igor Dodon, (left) was first suspended from his presidential duties in October 2017.

- 17 October - The Constitutional Court of Moldova temporarily suspended President Igor Dodon's powers as President of Moldova for failing to appoint in proposed Eugen Sturza as Defence Minister.

=== December ===
- 2 December - Celebrations in honour of the 100th anniversary of the proclamation of the Moldovan Democratic Republic took place.

== Deaths ==
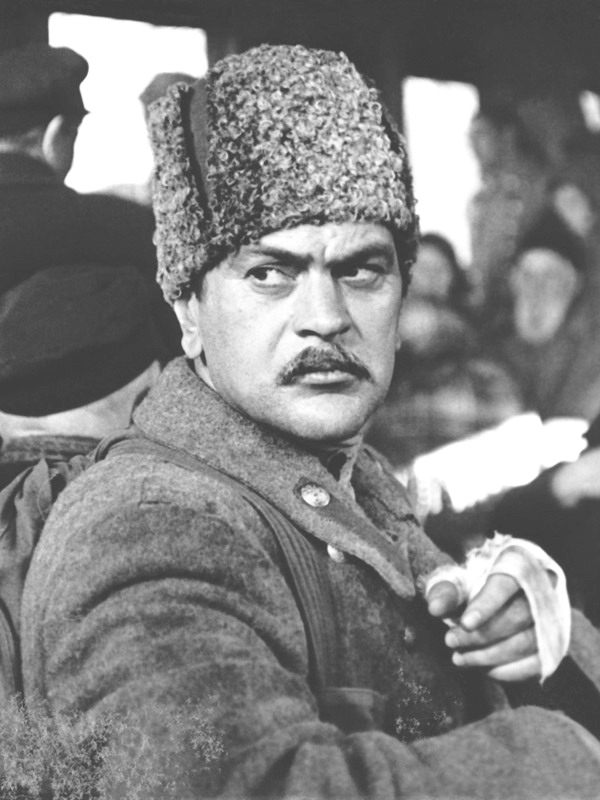
Ion Ungureanu

- 28 January – Ion Ungureanu, actor and politician (b. 1935).
- 29 January – Ruslan Barburoș, footballer (b. 1978).
- 3 February – Gheorghe Pârlea, actor (b.1944)
