= The Orion Loop =

- Directed by: Vasily Levin
- Written by: Alexei Leonov; Valentin Selivanov
- Cinematography: Vadim Avloshenko; Eduard Gubsky; Yuri Lemeshev
- Edited by: V. Monyatovskaya
- Music by: Aleksandr Zatsepin
- Production company: Odessa Film Studio
- Release date: April 1981 (Soviet Union)
- Running time: 80 minutes
- Country: Soviet Union
- Language: Russian

The Orion Loop (Russian: Петля Ориона, romanized: Petlya Oriona) is a 1981 Soviet science fiction film directed by Vasily Levin.

Cosmonaut Alexei Leonov, together with Valentin Selivanov, wrote the film's screenplay.

== Plot ==
The film is preceded by a short interview with a group of consultants who are discussing the problem of first contact with extraterrestrial civilizations.

At the boundary of the Solar System powerful radiation arises, which drives the astronauts insane. The phenomenon is called the "Orion Loop". To investigate this phenomenon, the Soviet ship Phaeton with a mixed crew of people and "cybers"—androids designed by cybernetic Skryabin—is sent from Earth on a United Nations mission. Robots can withstand extreme conditions, and in order for the crew not to be distracted by outsiders, they are made as the team's doubles.

Having reached the destination, the crew comes into contact with holograms—envoys of an unknown alien civilization, which lived thousands of years ago on the tenth planet of the Solar System. Earth is threatened by a serious danger—the galactic virus RZ, causing a "glass disease". The aliens are trying to save humanity by sending a stream of "relic neutrinos" from their planet to create an energy barrier around the Earth (namely, the "Orion Loop") that protects people from viruses and diseases.

Communication with aliens is dangerous for the crew, since the radiation of the hologram acts directly on the human brain. Because of the powerful radiation, two "cybers" have been lost. Navigator Augustus goes into outer space to reconfigure the ship's protection but receives extensive brain damage. Doctor Masha cures him with the help of the medical technology of "psychocontact", which she developed together with her mother Anna Petrovna, who died in the process of experiments.

The cybernetician interprets alien intentions as hostile and wants to destroy the "Orion Loop". He hurts the commander and tries to reboot the computer to change the flight mission, but causes a short circuit and dies, damaging the electronic circuitry and robot-doctor. The commander decides to go into outer space and go through the center of the loop to prove its harmlessness to people. As a result, his wound heals completely, leaving no traces.

A meteor shower damages the engineer's bay. Engineer Mitya's robot-twin tries to open the airtight door, endangering the lives of the rest of the crew, but Mitya deactivates it a few seconds before depressurization. The team thinks that he has died, but the aliens have time to save him, surrounding him with an energy cocoon.

The envoys find a way to communicate safely with the crew. They say: "We come in peace". The ship returns to Earth to prepare it for contact.

== Cast ==
- Leonid Bakshtayev — Pavel Belov (commander of the ship) / Commander—2
- Gennady Shkuratov — August Goris (navigator) / Navigator—2
- Anatoly Mateshko — Mitya Tamarkin (airborne engineer) / Bort—Engineer—2
- Vitaly Doroshenko — Alexander Sagansky (cybernetic) / Cybernetic—2
- Lyudmila Smorodina — Maria Dementieva (doctor) / Doctor—2
- Anatoly Azo — Nikolai Krechet (project manager)
- Givi Tohadze — Old Man (alien)
- Lia Eliava — Woman (Anna Petrovna, alien)
- Elena Kokalevskaya — Eya (alien)
