= Mykhailo Skorulskyi =

Ukrainian composer (1887–1950)

- Михайло Скорульський
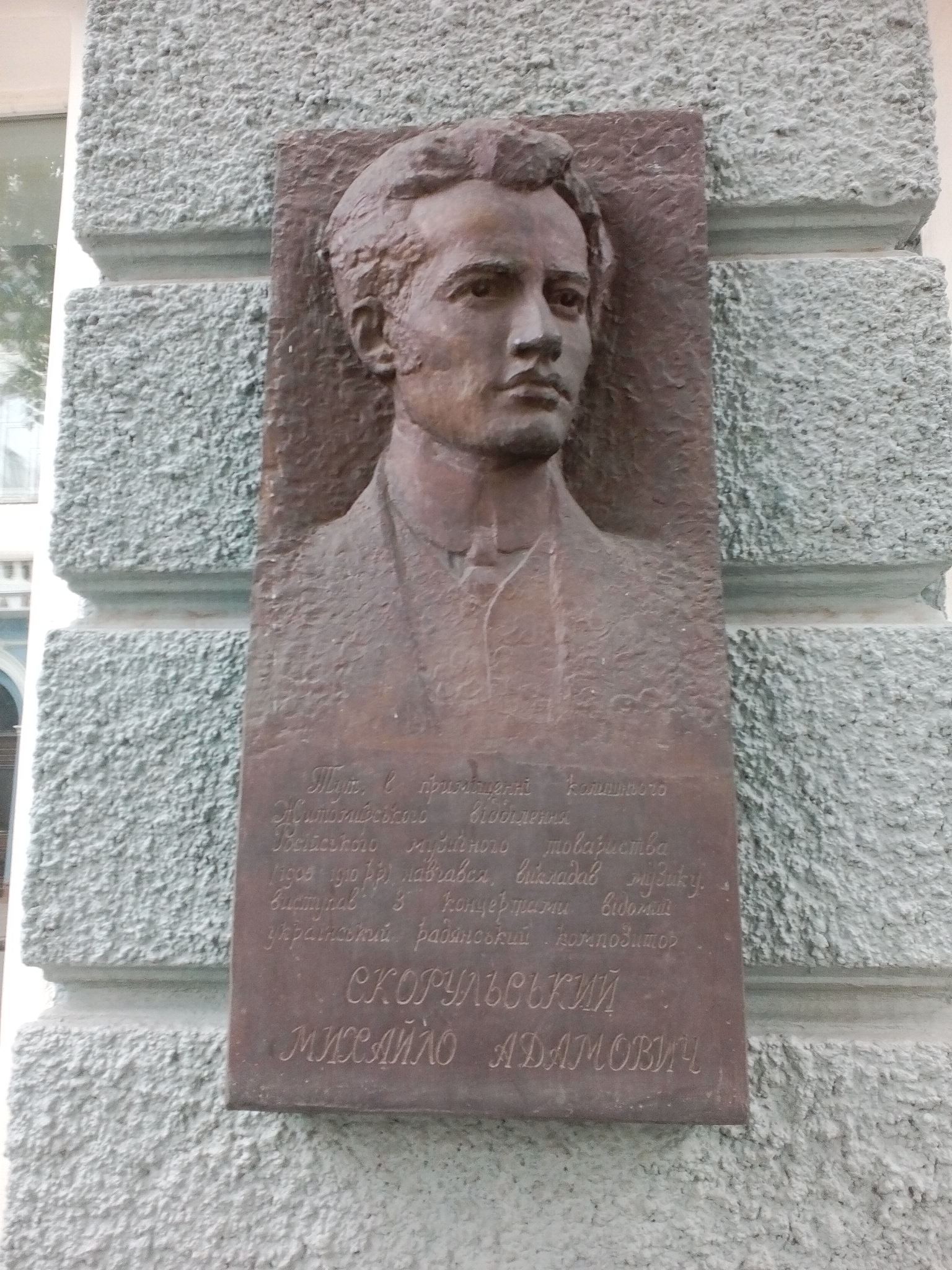
- Plaque in Zhytomyr where Skorulskyi studied
- Born: 6 September 1887 [O.S. 25 August] Kiev, Kiev Governorate, Russian Empire (present-day Kyiv, Ukraine)
- Died: 21 February 1950 (aged 62); Moscow, Russian SFSR, Soviet Union
- Occupation: Composer

Mykhailo Adamovych Skorulskyi (Note: Ukrainian: Михайло Адамович Скорульський, romanized: Mykhailo Adamovych Skorulskyi; Russian: Михаил Адамович Скорульский, romanized: Mikhail Adamovich Skorulsky) (6 September 1887 [O.S. 25 August] – 21 February 1950) was a Ukrainian composer. In 1936, he composed the score to Lisova Pisnya (The Forest Song), a three-act ballet based on the drama of the same name by Lesya Ukrainka. The ballet premiered in 1946.
