= Lia Eliava =

Georgian actress

- Born: May 28, 1934; Tbilisi, USSR
- Died: October 8, 1998 (aged 64); Tbilisi, Republic of Georgia
- Occupation: actress
- Awards: People's Artist of the Georgian SSR (1976)

Lia Eliava (Georgian: ლია ელიავა; 28 May 1934 – 8 October 1998) was a Georgian actress and was recognized as People's Artist of the Georgian SSR. She appeared in the 1980 Soviet science fiction film The Orion Loop.

== Biography ==
Lia Eliava was born in Tbilisi. After graduating from school she continued studying in National theatrical institute of A. Lunacharski of Moscow and she graduated from there in 1955. From the same year she was an actress of film production company "Georgian film". In 1960 she received the dignity of Georgian honorary artist, and in 1976 - National artist of Georgia. She had played in movies since 1956. In many films her partner is her real husband - popular Georgian actor Otar Koberidze.
