= The Tsar's Bride (film) =

- Russian: Царская невеста
- Directed by: Vladimir Gorikker
- Written by: Andrei Donatov; Vladimir Gorikker; Lev Mey; Nikolai Rimsky-Korsakov
- Starring: Raisa Nedashkovskaya; Natalya Rudnaya; Otar Koberidze; Georgi Shevtsov; Vladimir Zeldin; Nikolai Timofeyev
- Cinematography: Kh. Kukels
- Music by: Nikolai Rimsky-Korsakov
- Release date: 1965
- Country: Soviet Union
- Language: Russian

The Tsar's Bride (Russian: Царская невеста) is a 1965 Soviet drama film directed by Vladimir Gorikker.

== Plot ==
The film is based on the eponymous opera by Nikolai Rimsky-Korsakov.

== Cast ==
- Raisa Nedashkovskaya as Marfa
- Natalya Rudnaya as Lyubasha
- Otar Koberidze as Grigori Gryaznoy
- Georgi Shevtsov as Malyuta Skuratov (as G. Shevtsov)
- Vladimir Zeldin as Bomely
- Nikolai Timofeyev as Sobakin
- Viktor Nuzhny as Ivan Lykov
- Marina Maltseva as Dunyasha
- Tamara Loginova as Saburova
- Pyotr Glebov as Tsar Ivan
