= Travel in April =

- Russian: Путешествие в апрель
- Directed by: Vadim Derbenyov
- Written by: Aureliu Busuiok; Dmitri Vasiliu
- Starring: Rolan Bykov; Dumitru Fusu; Valentina Izbeschuk; Konstantin Konstantinov; Rayisa Nedashkivska; Ion Ungureanu; Aleksandr Zbruev
- Cinematography: Vadim Derbenyov; Vitali Kalashnikov; Dmitriy Motornyy
- Release date: 1962
- Country: Soviet Union
- Language: Russian

Travel in April (Russian: Путешествие в апрель) is a 1962 Soviet romantic comedy film directed by Vadim Derbenyov.

A student journalist goes down the river to Nizhny Lazuren, where he is expected, but he ends up in the fabulous Upper Lazuren, where he meets a beautiful woman named Mariutsa, because of whom he stays there.

== Plot ==
A journalism student named Kostika travels by riverboat to the village of Nizhniye Lazureny for his internship. Upon arriving, he encounters a girl named Mariutsa on his way to the kolkhoz chairman’s office and instantly falls in love. At the chairman’s office, Kostika learns the chairman is absent but meets Efim, who offers to help him locate the chairman. Along the way, Kostika discovers that Mariutsa is Efim’s daughter. Realizing he has mistakenly arrived in the wrong village, Kostika rejects an offer to stay in Verkhniye Lazureny but decides to help a boy named Savka replace his lost money to buy soccer gear for the class. However, this act of kindness leaves Kostika without funds to continue his journey, forcing him to send a telegram asking for money and temporarily remain in the village.

During a local dance, Kostika meets Mariutsa again and accidentally kisses her on the cheek, prompting her to leave abruptly. After an awkward encounter with a group of locals who mock him, Kostika struggles to find lodging and ends up sleeping in a barn. The next day, while searching for food, he stumbles upon Savka’s family garden. In gratitude for Kostika’s earlier help, Savka feeds him generously, and an intoxicated Kostika falls asleep in Savka’s house. Mariutsa, returning home, finds him asleep in her bed, much to her dismay. When Efim and his wife come home, they reluctantly accept Kostika as their guest. While helping the family and awaiting his money transfer, Kostika grows closer to Mariutsa but faces tension as her family disapproves of his presence.

One night, Kostika joins Mariutsa in the kolkhoz orchard, where they talk until a frost endangers the apple trees, prompting a frantic response from the workers. Mariutsa is reprimanded for negligence, and Kostika is ordered to leave the village. Though he asks Mariutsa to leave with him, she declines but promises to write. On the riverboat, after being forcibly escorted out of the village by local youths, Kostika dreams of Mariutsa once more. Determined to return, he jumps into the river and heads back to Verkhniye Lazureny under the cover of night.

== Cast ==
- Rolan Bykov
- Dumitru Fusu
- Valentina Izbeschuk
- Konstantin Konstantinov
- Rayisa Nedashkivska
- Ion Ungureanu
- Aleksandr Zbruyev
