= Mavka =

Female spirit in Ukrainian mythology

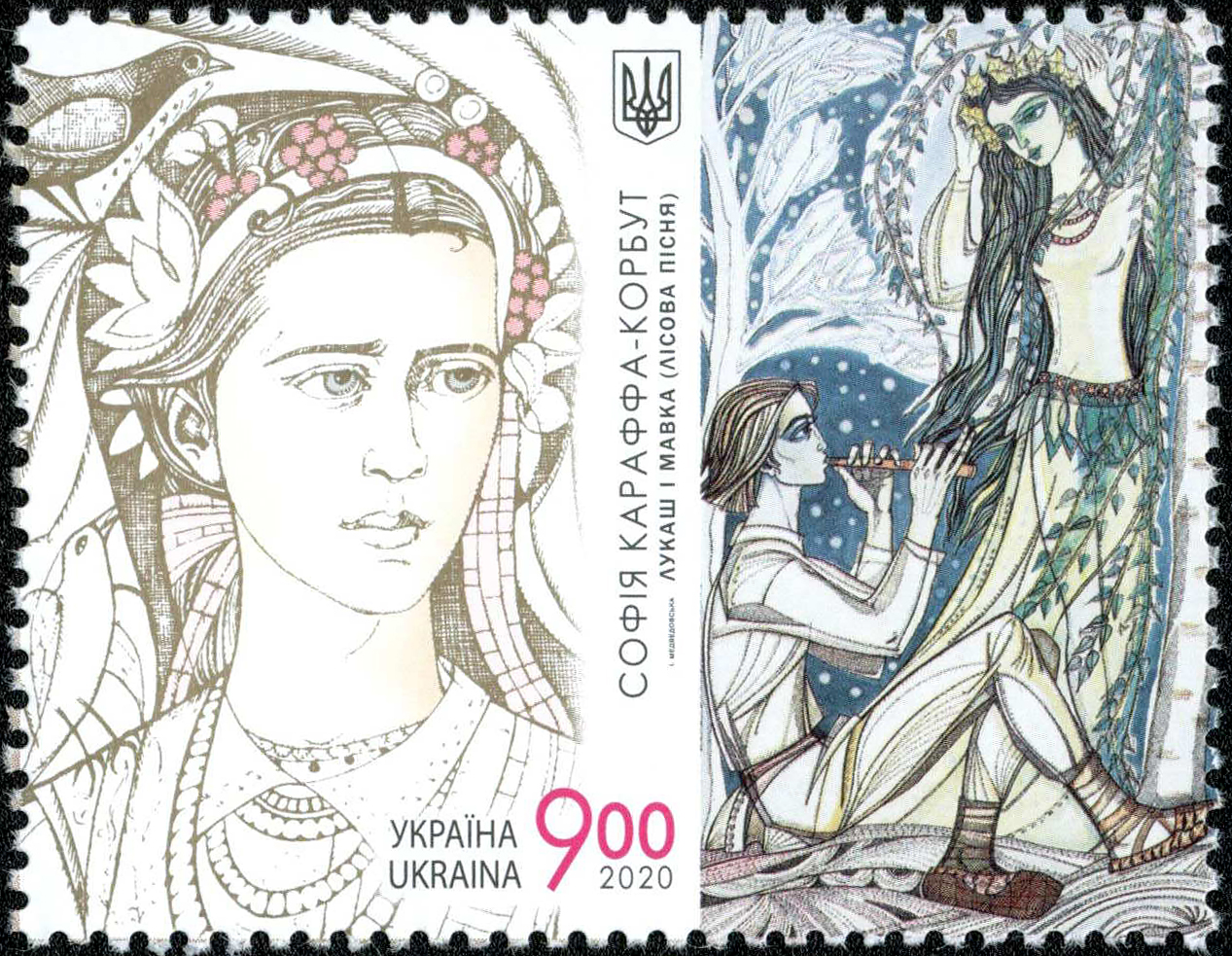
- Stamp featuring Lukash and Mavka from The Forest Song

Creature information
- Other name: Ukrainian: Нявка
- Grouping: Female legendary creatures
- Folklore: Slavic paganism

Origin
- Country: Ukraine
- Region: Ukrainian Carpathians

Mavka (Ukrainian: Мавка [ˈmɑu̯kɐ]) or Nyavka (Ukrainian: Нявка [ˈnʲɑu̯kɐ]) is a type of female spirit in Ukrainian folklore and mythology. The Mavka is a long-haired "Soul of the Forest", typically depicted as a temptress figure who lures men to their deaths. (Note: Kushnir (2014), quote: "Mavka is different from other types of female spirits in that her evil is not intentional. At the sight of a young man, she falls into a trance and realizes her actions too late to change anything. Mavka is a very beautiful young maiden with very long hair ...")

== Terminology ==
There is variation in the names and spelling, including Ukrainian: Мавка, mavka, навка, navka, нявка, nyavka. However, depending on telling, there are differences between the Mavka and Nyavka. These terms all derive from *navь 'the dead', and are cognate with Bulgarian: нави, navi (plural).

== Folklore ==
The spirits known by this term represented the souls of girls who had died unnatural, tragic or premature deaths, particularly unchristened babies. Mavkas often appear in the form of beautiful young girls who entice and lure young men into the woods, where they "tickle" them to death. Mavkas have no reflection in water, nor do they cast shadows. In some accounts, they were also said to help farmers by looking after cattle and driving out wild animals.

A subtype of the Mavkas are the Nyavkas, which behave the same except for having "no back", meaning that their spine and some other insides can be seen; (Note: Those were more often called "Nyavka" and they were believed to live in Western Ukraine, which has more dangerous mountain rivers than Central Ukraine, while Mavkas, who were believed to live in Central Ukraine, had their backs.) the most defining feature between determining Mavkas and Nyavkas is whether or not the insides are visible from the back.

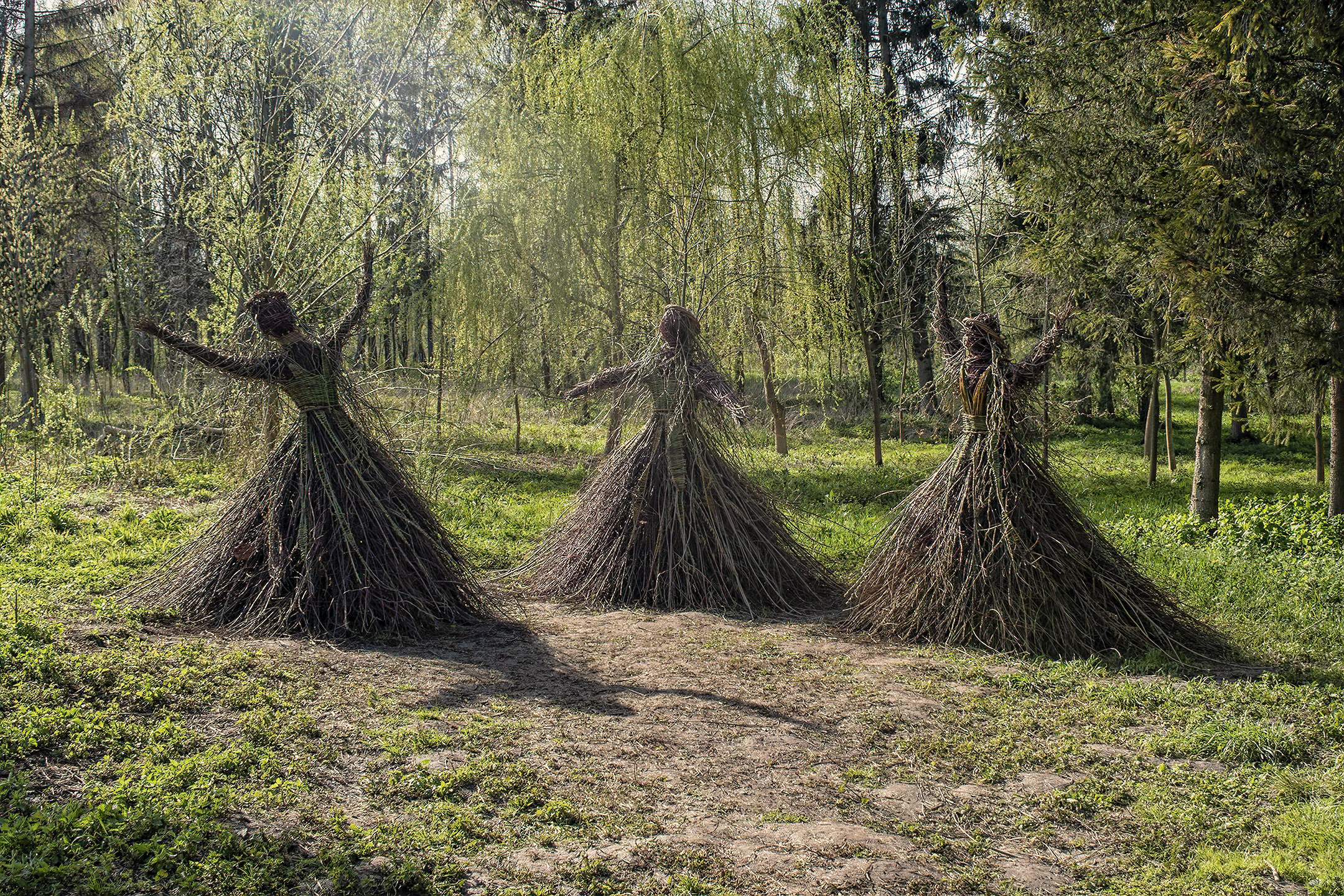
Eco-sculptures "Awakening of forest mavkas". Made by the creative group of Volyn Professional College of Culture and Arts named after I. F. Stravinsky

Mavkas and Nyavkas were believed to live in groups in forests, mountain caves, or sheds, which they decorated with rugs. They made thread of stolen flax and wove thin transparent cloth for making clothes for themselves. They loved flowers, which they wore in their hair. In the spring, they planted flowers in the mountains, to which they enticed young men, whom they tickled to death. On Pentecost (known as Navka's Easter, Ukrainian: На́вський Вели́кдень), they held games, dances, and orgies. A demon accompanied them on a flute or pipes.

To save an unchristened baby's soul, one must throw up a kerchief during Pentecost holidays, say their name and add "I baptise you". The rescued soul would then go to heaven. If the soul lived up to seven years and did not go to heaven, the baby would turn into a mavka and haunt the earth.

== Popular culture ==
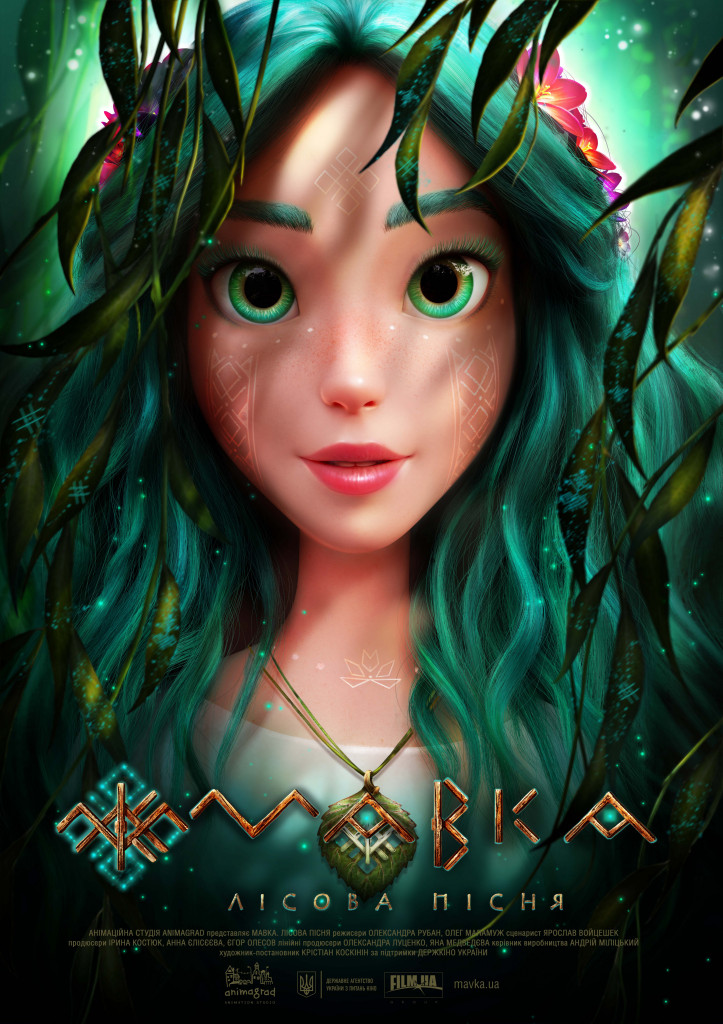
Movie poster, Mavka: The Forest Song

- Mavkas are depicted in literature, most notably in Lesia Ukrainka's The Forest Song and nyavkas are depicted in Mykhailo Kotsiubynsky's Shadows of Forgotten Ancestors.
- In modern culture the Ukrainian music band, Mavka, is named after the mythological creature.
- In 2022, Ukrainian singer Eria released the song "Mavka".
- The 2023 film Mavka: The Forest Song, is based on Ukrainian mythology.
- The 2026 film Mavka: The True Myth, in which the forest nymph Mavka hunts or people with defiled souls but instead falls in love with a young biologist who protects the forest from poachers.

== See also ==
- Mavka: The Forest Song (2023 animated film)
- The Forest Song (1917/1918 play by Lesya Ukrainka)
- Forest Song (1963 film)
- Mavka (song by Authentix)
- Mare (folklore)
- Naiad
- Nymph
- Revenant
- Succubus
- Nixie (folklore)
- Skogsrå
