= The Formula of Rainbow =

- Russian: Формула радуги
- Directed by: Georgi Yungvald-Khilkevich
- Written by: G. Chernyavsky
- Starring: Nikolai Fedortsov; Rayisa Nedashkivska; Savely Kramarov; Ivan Ryzhov; Frunzik Mkrtchyan
- Cinematography: Vadim Avloshenko; Dmitri Fyodorovsky; Boris Macheret
- Music by: Aleksandr Zatsepin
- Production company: Odesa Film Studio
- Release date: 1966
- Running time: 70 minute
- Country: Soviet Union/Ukrainian SSR
- Language: Russian

The Formula of Rainbow (Russian: Формула радуги, romanized: Formula radugi) is a 1966 Soviet science fiction comedy film directed by Georgi Yungvald-Khilkevich.

The film tells about the scientist Vladimir Bantikov, who decides to create his double in the form of a robot, but this robot suddenly begins to live its own life...

== Plot ==
Vladimir Bantikov, a young scientist at the Institute of Unsolvable Problems, is working on a groundbreaking formula to create a rainbow. His efforts come close to success, but his prototype—a set of experimental chemicals—is accidentally destroyed by a colleague. Frustrated by the institute’s bureaucratic meetings, Bantikov secretly shifts his focus to a side project: designing and building a humanoid robot named Yasha. Once completed, Yasha is tasked with attending meetings in Bantikov’s place, functioning as his double. However, Yasha’s advanced capabilities soon lead to his arrogance, prompting him to escape the lab and venture into the city.

Equipped with a device that allows him to alter his appearance, Yasha evades capture by constantly changing his form. However, during his escapades, he loses the device, which becomes irretrievably buried under construction materials at a building site. Despite his logical precision, Yasha's interactions with people reveal his lack of humor and emotional depth, drawing attention to the robotic tendencies of some humans Bantikov encounters during the search. Eventually, Yasha is found and reassigned as an instructor at a seaside sports base, where his literal-minded nature leads to comical situations, such as chasing vehicles for fuel to keep his motor running. Unable to subdue Yasha through conventional means, the institute staff resorts to trickery, luring him into the sea, where a short circuit disables him. After repairs and reprogramming, Yasha takes on the humble role of a doorman at the institute.

Meanwhile, Bantikov continues his experiments to create a rainbow. During a chemical reaction, an accidental explosion in the lab propels him out of a window, only for trolleybus wires to break his fall. As sparks fly, a vivid rainbow suddenly appears in the clear sky, captivating passersby. The film concludes on a triumphant note: Bantikov’s experiment succeeds, Yasha evolves into a more human-like being, and the institute achieves breakthroughs that pave the way for new scientific challenges.

== Cast ==
- Nikolai Fedortsov as Vladimir Bantikov / Yashka the robot
- Rayisa Nedashkivska as Lyusya Petrova
- Savely Kramarov as Vasya
- Ivan Ryzhov as Petya
- Frunzik Mkrtchyan as Frunzik Kaburyan
- Georgy Vitsin as Toy factory manager
- Roman Tkachuk as Kozdolevsky
- Natalya Varley as Nurse
- Nikolai Grinko as Vacationer
- Zoya Fyodorova as Aunt Shura
