= Forest Song =

1963 Soviet fantasy film

- Directed by: Viktor Ivchenko
- Written by: Viktor Ivchenko
- Based on: The Forest Song by Lesya Ukrainka
- Starring: Rayisa Nedashkivska; Volodymyr Sydorchuk; Petro Vesklyarov; Ada Rohovtseva
- Cinematography: Oleksiy Prokopenko
- Music by: Ihor Shamo
- Production company: Dovzhenko Film Studios
- Release date: 1963
- Running time: 97 minutes
- Country: Soviet Union
- Language: Ukrainian

Forest Song (Russian: «Лесная песня», romanized: Lesnaya pesnya, Ukrainian: «Лісова пісня», romanized: Lisova pisnia) is a 1963 Soviet Ukrainian fantasy drama film directed by Viktor Ivchenko.

== Plot ==
There is a guy and a girl who are reading the book "The Forest Song" by Lesya Ukrainka on the river bank. Reading transfers them to Polesia where the action of the drama takes place.

The mythological characters and people meet in the magic wood. The music of the nozzle, which is played by country guy Lukash, awakens the forest girl Mavka from a dream. They fall in love. Mavka leaves the forest kingdom and goes to people because of Lukash. Lukash's mother treats Mavka with hostility. She insists on Lukash’s marriage to the widow Kilina and it causes a very intolerable pain to Mavka. But she is taken away "By the one who sits in the rock ". Leshy damns Lukash for his unfaithfulness and turns him into a wolf.

After Lukash’s uncle dies, he flounces in the wood and his shout returns Mavka from her drowsiness. She forgives Lukash and he becomes a man again.

Hoping to meet Lukash, Mavka comes to his house where meets Kilina, and that damns her. Mavka turns into a weeping willow. Lukash comes back home, and Kilina's son asks him to play a pipe. Lukash plays the melody, which made acquaintance with Mavka. The pipe plays Mavka’s voice, and Kilina makes Lukash cut down a willow. After Lukash’s refusal, Kilina tries to make it herself. Perelesnik saves Mavka.

Lukash goes to the wood, where he meets Mavka's wraith. The memories of spring and love in an autumn night cover with the snow. Lukash sits still under the birch … The girl reads the final words of the book on the seashore, stroking the guy’s head.

== Cast ==
- Rayisa Nedashkivska as Mavka
- Volodymyr Sydorchuk as Lukash
- Petro Vesklyarov as Uncle Lev
- Volodymyr Rudin as Lisovyk
- Valery Kvitka as Perelesnyk
- Varvara Hubenko (Maslyuchenko) as Lukash's mother
- Raisa Pyrozhenko as Kylyna
- Raisa Doroshenko as Water Nymph
- Ada Rohovtseva as Meadow Nymph
- Leonid Marchenko as Kutz

== See also ==
- The Forest Song
- Lesya Ukrainka
