= Zhyva voda =

Жива вода

Studio album by Khrystyna Soloviy
- Released: 22 September 2015
- Genre: Folk; soul
- Length: 44:38
- Label: Supersymmetry
- Producer: Sviatoslav Vakarchuk

Khrystyna Soloviy chronology
Жива вода (2015)	Liubyi druh (2018)

Zhyva voda (Ukrainian: Жива вода, lit. 'Living water') is the debut studio album by the Ukrainian recording artist Khrystyna Soloviy. It was released on 22 September 2015 in Ukraine through Supersymmetry.

== Background and recording ==
The album consists of 12 songs, two of which were written by Soloviy, while the other ten are folk songs (nine Lemko and one Ukrainian) adapted by Sviatoslav Vakarchuk. The songs "Pod oblachkom" and "Trymai" were also released as music videos.

The recording of the album took place in Kyiv, at the studio "ZvukoTseh". The sound producers of the album were Miloš Jelić and Sviatoslav Vakarchuk.

== Track listing ==
Standard edition
No.	Title	Length
1.	"Nese Halia vodu (Ukrainian: Несе Галя воду)"	3:57
2.	"Yanchyk (Ukrainian: Янчик)"	2:41
3.	"Trymai (Ukrainian: Тримай)"	3:28
4.	"Synia pisnia (Ukrainian: Синя пісня)"	3:18
5.	"Hore dolom (Ukrainian: Горе долом)"	3:58
6.	"Sydit ptashok (Ukrainian: Сидіт пташок)"	3:46
7.	"Tykha voda (Ukrainian: Тиха вода)"	3:21
8.	"V temnu nichku (Ukrainian: В темну нічку)"	4:06
9.	"Teche voda kalamutna (Ukrainian: Тече вода каламутна)"	3:48
10.	"Yak ishov ya (Ukrainian: Як ішов я)"	3:40
11.	"Hamerytskyi kray (Ukrainian: Гамерицький край)" (with Sviatoslav Vakarchuk)	3:40
12.	"Pod oblachkom (Ukrainian: Под облачком)"	3:46
Total length:		44:38

== Release history ==
Country	Date	Label	Format
Ukraine	22 September 2015	Supersymmetry	Digital download, CD
