= The Drayman and the King =

- Russian: Биндюжник и Король
- Directed by: Vladimir Alenikov
- Written by: Vladimir Alenikov; Isaak Babel; Asar Eppel
- Produced by: Zinovi Genzer; Tanya Shifman
- Starring: Armen Dzhigarkhanyan; Zinoviy Gerdt; Raisa Nedashkovskaya; Irina Rozanova; Maksim Leonidov
- Cinematography: Anatoliy Grishko
- Edited by: Lyudmila Savina
- Music by: Aleksandr Zhurbin
- Release date: 1989
- Country: Soviet Union
- Language: Russian

The Drayman and the King (Russian: Биндюжник и Король) is a 1989 Soviet musical comedy-drama film directed by Vladimir Alenikov.

== Plot ==
The film takes place in the legendary Moldavanka. The film tells the story of the attractive bandit Benya Krik named King, the son of a binder, who leaves the family for the beautiful Marusa.

== Cast ==
- Armen Dzhigarkhanyan as Mendel Krik
- Zinoviy Gerdt as Arie Leib
- Raisa Nedashkovskaya as Nekhama
- Irina Rozanova as Maruska
- Maksim Leonidov as Benya Krik
- Andrey Urgant as Levka
- Tatyana Vasileva
- Roman Kartsev as Boyarsky
- Yevgeny Evstigneev as Nikifor
- Mariya Itkina
