= Forest Song (opera) =

Opera by Vitalij Kyrejko

Forest song is an opera by Vitaliy Kyreyko written in 1957 and first performed in Lviv in 1958. Libretto is based on the drama of the same name by Lesya Ukrainka.

Opera consists of three acts. The music of the Forest Song is romantic and uses – in addition to deeply folk melodies and dances – as a model, mainly the romantic opera of the 19th century. Folk melody characterizes mainly human characters, fantastic creatures are characterized by a special timbre, chromatism and instrumental melody.

According to Valentyna Antoniuk, "Forest Song" is "a classic pearl of the world's cultural heritage", and "even if he did not write a single note, this work itself would make the composer's name eternal."
