= Mavka: The Forest Song =

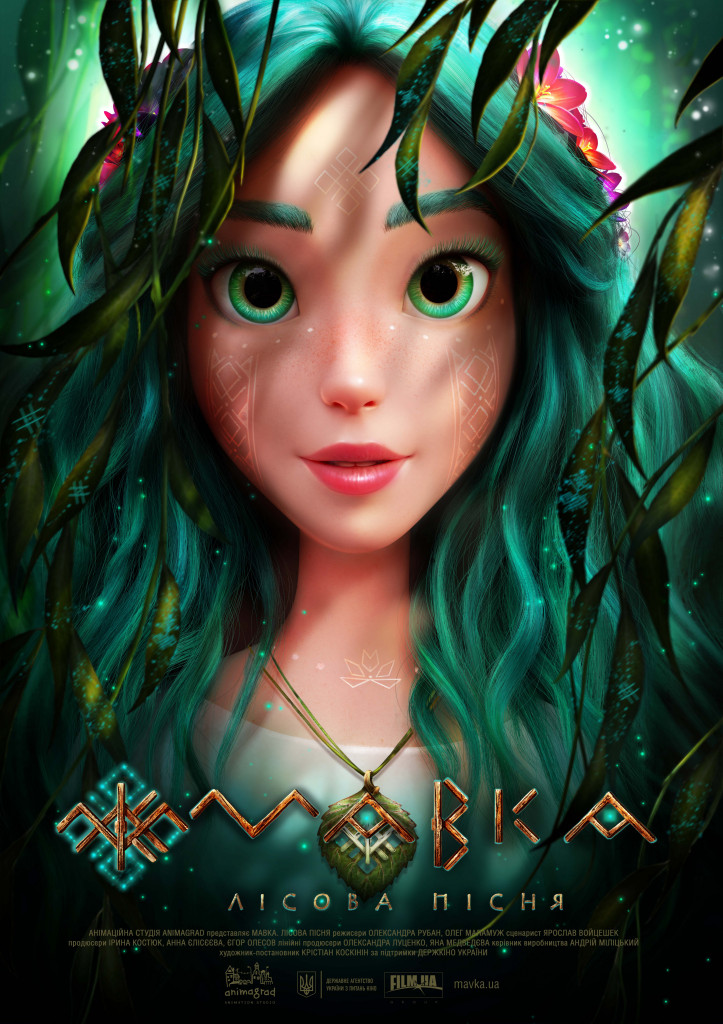
- Ukrainian theatrical release poster
- Directed by: Oleh Malamuzh; Oleksandra Ruban
- Screenplay by: Yaroslav Voitseshek
- Based on: The Forest Song by Lesya Ukrainka
- Produced by: Iryna Kostiuk; Egor Olesov; Anna Yelisieieva
- Starring: Natalka Denisenko; Artem Pyvovarov; Olena Kravets
- Music by: Dario Vero; Maksym Berezhnyak; DakhaBrakha
- Production companies: Animagrad Animation Studio; Film.UA Group
- Distributed by: Film.UA Distribution/Kinomania (Ukraine); Shout! Studios (United States)
- Release dates: March 2, 2023 (Ukraine); August 15, 2023 (United States)
- Running time: 99 minutes
- Country: Ukraine
- Language: English
- Budget: ₴187.2 million
- Box office: $17.8 million

Mavka: The Forest Song (Ukrainian: «Мавка. Лісова пісня», romanized: Mavka. Lisova pisnia) is an independently-made Ukrainian 3D-animated fantasy film. It was created in 2023 by the Animagrad film studio (which is a part of The Film.UA Group). Based on Lesya Ukrainka's play, The Forest Song, it portrays characters from Slavic and Ukrainian folk mythology. Oleksandra Ruban and Oleh Malamuzh directed the film.

The animated film is set in two worlds: one enchanted and one human. The main theme of the film is a love story between an enchanted forest dweller (Mavka) and a human (Lukas), and their battle with the villain Kylina, who desires to own a magical forest wellspring.

Mavka: The Forest Song was released in Ukraine on March 2, 2023. This animated film has set several national records during its release in the cinemas. In particular, it became the highest-grossing Ukrainian film project for the whole history of the independent Ukrainian cinematography and entered the list of the twenty best films in the history of Ukrainian cinema.

Dubbed into the English language and also into 32 other languages, Mavka: the Forest Song was shown on theater screens in approximately 140 countries worldwide. During the national release period, the original Ukrainian language version also ran in other countries.

== Plot ==
The story begins with a flashback about a magical tree called the Source of Life inside the large and ancient Enchanted Forest. The Source of Life nourishes the whole forest as well as the inhabitants with its power. One day, a human trespassed through the Dark Mountain and entered the Enchanted Forest. The human was the owner of a sawmill and he begged Lesh, the current guardian of the forest, to give him a drop of water from the Source of Life to save his dying newborn daughter. Feeling pity, Lesh gave the drop to the sawmill owner, but then, he returned with an army of humans to take all the power for himself. This led to a fierce battle, which Lesh won, but at a great cost to him and his people. He then passes a new law that no humans would be allowed in the forest and the passage in the Dark Mountain must remain closed off forever.

In the present day, a virtuous nymph named Mavka wakes up from her winter sleep and awakens every living creature in the Forest, along with her noisy friend, Hush, and her kitty-frog companion, Swampy. The forest dwellers all rejoice at the spring.

Meanwhile, in a human village located near the Enchanted Forest, a woman named Kylina arrives and introduces herself as the now adult daughter of and heiress to the sawmill owner. She proposes a job to the villagers: to go into the Dark Mountain for a huge sum of money, but they refuse due to believing there are evil spirits in the woods. A young musician named Lukas needs money to buy medicine for his sick uncle, Leo, so he accepts the job. Kylina orders him to find a tree with a special leaf in the Enchanted Forest.

In the Enchanted Forest, Lesh announces that the Supreme Spirits of Nature will choose a new guardian at the Heart of the Forest, as Lesh has become less powerful over time. A water nymph named Ondina criticizes Mavka's abundant kindness and deems her unqualified for the role.

Mavka encounters Lukas and tries to scare him away, but after hearing him play his sopilka, she admires his musical talent. After Lukas explains his intentions, Mavka believes he's not evil so she offers to give him a cure, with Hush reluctantly helping them as Lukas promises he'll leave after. In gratitude for her help, Lukas promises Mavka to play his music for her. After spending time walking through the forest together, feelings arise between them.

At midnight, Lesh summons the forest dwellers to the tree with Lukas in disguise. The Spirits choose Mavka as the new guardian of the forest, which Ondina objects to the choice. Lukas speaks out in Mavka's defense but Ondina sees through his disguise and he gets chased out. Mavka allows Lukas to escape and gives him a drop from the Source of Life tree to cure his uncle, but he doesn't have time to play his music for her as he had promised. Ondina berates her for letting him go and then warns that he will eventually betray her. When Lukas returns, Kylina is not convinced that he came back empty-handed, so she orders her stylist, Frol, to keep an eye on him. Mavka's cure successfully heals Uncle Leo and makes him younger. Frol finds the special leaf from the tree, confirming that Lukas did find it so Kylina prepares for when he goes back to the forest.

The following day, noticing that Lukas had dropped his sopilka during his escape, Mavka disguises herself to look human and goes to the village with Swampy to return the sopilka to Lukas and to try to make peace with the humans. Lukas invites Mavka to come to the village's spring festival and she accepts. At the festival, he gifts her with a vyshyvanka dress as well as a pendant he made with four carved runes symbolizing the elements of nature. After having a good time enjoying the folk dancing, Lukas tries to keep his promise to play his music for Mavka, but when he plays, it accidentally undoes Mavka's disguise and reveals her as a nymph to the village. Seizing the opportunity, Kylina locks Lukas away in the mansion's basement and turns the villagers against Mavka, but Lesh saves her. Lesh tells Mavka the story of what had happened many years before, and how he once used the Spark of Rage, a pyrokinetic power bestowed on him by the Supreme Spirit of Fire, the One Who Sits in the Rock, which allowed him to defeat the sawmill owner's army. But that power came at a price, the price being his immense strength. He tells her the relationship between humans and the forest is a never-ending cycle of fire and death.

Kylina tries to get Lukas to mark the location of the Source of Life tree on her map, but he refuses. When he figures out Kylina captured Mavka, he agrees to her demands, only to realize that it was Frol disguised as Mavka. Kylina starts drowning Lukas in her basement and rallies the villagers to raid the forest. Finding her, Mavka tries to reason with Kylina by telling her the story of her father, the sawmill owner, and how the forest had saved her. Kylina reveals that she wasn't the sawmill owner's daughter, instead his wife. Kylina made her husband lie about their "daughter" being ill and also that she was the mastermind behind the first battle years ago due to her selfish desire for immortality and eternal beauty. Kylina then tricks Mavka into thinking Lukas betrayed her by taking advantage of her kindness and selling the Source of Life's location for money. This finally makes her think all humans are evil. A battle starts between the humans and the forest dwellers. Mavka, sad with regret, summons the One Who Sits in the Rock to bestow her with the Spark of Rage, promising to pay the price with her life. The power of the Spark of Rage proves to be too much as she loses her sense of empathy and drives out both the humans and forest dwellers together. A deadly firestorm descends on the village.

Hush, Swampy, and Dot, Lukas' dog, save Lukas from drowning and together they rush to stop Mavka from decimating the village. Realizing that Mavka can't hear his words, Lukas plays his sopilka, inspiring the villagers and forest dwellers to sing along to wake Mavka from her trance and stop the firestorm. They succeed, but Mavka is near death and Lukas cries as he pleads for her to come back. While Mavka's soul lies in the Void, she learns that Lukas never betrayed her. The One Who Sits in the Rock reaffirms that the Spirits made the right choice in choosing Mavka as the Guardian for she bridged the gap between the humans and the forest dwellers, but since she offered to pay the price with her life, she must remain in the Void for all of eternity. Mavka refuses, saying that her heart is full of something that will never die. Impressed by this, the Supreme Spirits return her to life and she awakens. Mavka and Lukas kiss as they reaffirm their love and the villagers and the forest dwellers agree to stop fighting and make peace.

In the post-credits scene, an old and wrinkled Kylina finds the Source of Life. Happy, she dives into the magical water, but within several minutes, she turns into a baby.

== Voice cast ==
=== Ukrainian cast ===
The animated film was dubbed to the Ukrainian language by the "#skoroukino" studio. The dubbing team: Laiti Biriukova, Dmytro Myalkovskiy; translation – Anna Pashchenko and Alina Haevska. The dubbing producer is Kateryna Braikovska.

- Natalka Denysenko as Mavka
  - Kateryna Kukhar and Taisia Khvostova (movements and plastique), while Khrystyna Soloviy performs two of Mavka's songs.
- Artem Pyvovarov as Lukas
- Olena Kravets as Kylina
- Serhiy Prytula as Frol
- Oleh Mykhailiuta as Leo, Lukas' uncle
- Natalya Sumska as the Healer
- DakhaBrakha as Lucas’ friends, village musicians Nina, Iryna, Olena and Marko
- Mykhailo Khoma as Hush
- Julia Sanina as Ondina, a mermaid
- Nazar Zadniprovskyi as Lesh
- Oleh Skrypka as the One Who Sits in the Rock
- Nina Matviienko as the Narrator
- Andriy Mostrenko as Erick and Dereck
- Kateryna Osadcha as various women

=== English cast ===
The dubbing process into the original English language for the international release happened in the "3beep" studio (New York City). The dubbing producer and the art director is Tom Wayland. The main characters were dubbed by:

- Laurie Hymes as Mavka
- Eddy Lee as Lukas
- Sarah Natochenny as Kylina
- Tom Wayland as Frol
- Scottie Ray as Leo
- Marc Thompson as Hush and Lesh
- Nikki Thomas as Ondina
- Mike Pollock as the One Who Sits in the Rock
- Marca Leigh as the Narrator and the Healer

H.D. Quinn, Alyson Leigh Rosenfeld, Christian Sanford, and Sarah Smithton provided additional voice performances. The script doctor was Jeffrey Hilton.

== Production ==
=== Development ===
The first idea to create the animated film on the basis of The Forest Song, a play by Lesya Ukrainka, appeared in 2014. The producer Iryna Kostiuk mentioned that Serhiy Sozanovskiy, the co-founder of the company Film.UA, was one of the people who proposed it.

The official brief was written in 2014. Until 2015 there was only the selection process of screenwriters' applications.

In September 2015, the press service of the Film.UA claimed about the beginning of the production of the animated film on the basis of the classic writing "The Forest Song" by Lesia Ukrainka. At the beginning of work the creators were willing to adapt "The Forest Song" to the family animation, make the happy end in it and to raise current topics, such as ecological issues. In 2016, the project came to the stage of the deep development: the work on the script writing started. The producers worked on the storyline and tried to cooperate with different authors. Later, the screenwriter Yaroslav Voitsesheck joined the project team. In September 2016, this project won the ninth competition by the Ukrainian State Film Agency and received state financing in 24.5 billion UAH.

The first teaser of the project was shown in 2017. In March 2017, the producers of "Film.UA Group" and "Animagrad" took the first international pitching of Mavka: The Forest Song in one of the biggest animation forums in Europe, "Cartoon Movie". It took place in Bordeux, France, and Ukraine was represented there for the first time. During the traditional survey within the forum, a lot of participants called the Mavka: The Forest Song pitch the best in the scope of 50 projects. The producers collected feedback from the major companies of the animated films market such as The Walt Disney Company, The International Animated Film Association (ASIFA), Canal+, TF1 International, Super RTL and others. In parallel with this event, the script was being written, as well as the appearance and the depiction of Mavka was under the work.

In 2018, the process of creating 2D-animatics started and it lasted until the end of 2019.

"When the script is done, the animatics starts. It is a 2D version of the whole animated film in accordance with the script. Our animatics was appeared to be very long and then the process of its shortening began. In fact, we wrote a new script for one more year. After rewriting of the script and redoing of animatics, you go into the expected timing and only after this the budget evaluations start. When you see that the budget is bigger than it was expected, you begin to simplify scenes. Or, you start looking for financing…" – Iryna Kostiuk in the Business Media Reports interview, April 2021.

=== Budget ===
In September 2016, this project won the ninth competition by the Ukrainian State Film Agency and received the state financing in 24.5 billion UAH. In December the agreement for 25% of the first budget for the production of Mavka: The Forest Song was signed. By that moment, the first budget was estimated in 98 078 911 UAH. In summer 2020 the Council of the State Support of the Cinema Art approved the budget increase of the project in 1.9 times. The Animagrad studio and the State Agency of Ukraine on Cinema signed the new agreement. In accordance with this agreement, the sum of the state financing was 25 million UAH, or 13.35% of the specified budget relatively.

By July 2021, the total budget of Mavka: The Forest Song was estimated in 187 241 525 UAH. The film production was partially financed by the Ukrainian State Film Agency. Considering all the changes, the total part of the state's participation in the film production was 49 519 728 UAH, or 26.45%.

=== Research and animation ===
The research of Mavka's depiction lasted for a year. After that, there were long authors' discussions about her actions: magic, clothes, creativity, behaviour style. In the opinion of Christian Koskinin, the art director of the animated film, the development of Mavka's depiction lasted 3 years, starting from the idea. "To tell that we had a straightforward and step-by-step process within which we can count the terms will be wrong – the evaluation is very abstract".

In 2020, the project team intended to write the film sound. However, the authors could not do this in the standard process because of the COVID-19 pandemic, but the process was not stopped. English has become the main language of the project and the original lip-sync was also created to the English language. The trial recording of the scoring happened in New York, USA (at the peak of COVID-19 lockdowns). The "3beep" company helped organize the scoring technical aspect: in collaboration with the "Postmodern" studio they created the recording system with remote access. In accordance with Egor Olesov's words, the sound recording had lasted for several weeks. Despite the trial version of the scoring, a part of voices became final ones and they were not changed. First of all, that is the sound of secondary characters. The choice of actors who dubbed the main characters for both English and Ukrainian versions happened later. Then, the process of the animated film's production in 3D started.

Ukrainian: Коли аніматик і базовий арт узгоджені, до роботи долучаються різні виробничі департаменти: створення 3D-асетів, виробництво лейаутів, look-development, анімація, візуальні ефекти, симуляція, рендер, композитинг. І потім уже музика та постпродакшен.

When both animatics and basic art are coordinated, different production departments are joined the working process. There are 3D-assets creation, layouts production, look-development, animation, visual effects, simulation, rendering and compositing. And only after that there are music and post-production.

— Ehor Olesov

Thus, the project was on the stage of working on layouts, animation and collection of the final scenes in 2021. Also, the production of all the 3D-assets were being finalized. In February 2021 there was a release of the second teaser-trailer to the future animated film, where Mavka was presented in a new and updated form. According to Anna Yeliseeva's words, Mavka's new design has become "wild, more sylvan" one. Potential viewers mostly criticized such a change. The official trailer in the Ukrainian version scoring appeared in the social media on December 20, 2021. According to the trailer, the animated film's premiere would have happened on December 29, 2022. In general, 400 people worked on Mavka.

=== During the Russian invasion ===
By the moment of Russia's full-scale invasion of Ukraine in February 2022, the project was in its final stage of development. Because of the war, a part of animators were on the temporarily occupied territory of Ukraine, some of them joined the Armed Forces of Ukraine. As well, the marketing action plan for the nearest month lost its relevance in a full scale. However, approximately a week was enough for the production studio for the development process reorganization and the work continued. Despite the hard military conditions, the film creators announced that the project would be finished in accordance with the pre-war plan, in the fourth quarter of 2022.

At the Cannes Film Festival market, the film was involved in a whole series of different events, among which was Animation Day organized by the "Annecy" festival of animated films. Moreover, there was one more event which took place in Cannes called "Annecy Goes To Cannes 2022". Mavka: The Forest Song was chosen for the pitching within the event.

The second official and main trailer was presented on February 1, 2023, by the Film.UA Group studio. Mavka's winter image was shown there together with the soundtrack "Mova Vitru" ("Song of the Wind") by Khrystyna Soloviy and Artem Pyvovarov played there. According to the trailer, the premiere was planned on March 2, 2023.

=== Related projects ===
Even before the official release of the animated film, there has appeared some related projects in different formats and on different platforms. Thus, "Mavka" became the multiplatform cross media brand which covered several fields of life. The filmmakers called it "The Mavka Universe". The first projects were the collection of dresses called "MAVKA by NAVRO" by Ukrainian fashion designer Olha Navrocka, the jewellery pendant "Mavka’s Amulet" by the jewellery house "OBERIG", branded book collection by the publication house "Kyiv Book House", handmade tapestries by the workshop house "Solomia" and AR application by Signal Red developers.

== Soundtrack ==
The film featured animated versions of the members of Ukrainian band, DakhaBrakha, with its soundtrack featuring music composed by the band.

The production team recreated authentic dance and ceremonial elements with the help of experts from the Ivan Honchar Museum National Center for Folk Culture. The music sequence includes an authentic vesnyanka ("spring folk song") performed by DakhaBrakha, with the musicians not only creating the music, but also their likenesses appearing in animated form as Lukas's friends, the village musicians.

Artem Pyvovarov and Khrystyna Soloviy presented the video clip of the film's main theme – "Mova Vitru" ("Song of the Wind") on 14 February 2023. They also made the English version of the song "Song of the Wind". In March Chrystyna Soloviy also presented the video clip to the second soundtrack "Lisova pisnia" or "Pisnia Lisu" ("Forest Song"). All the songs which were included in the animated film you can see below. The part of these songs were presented as a whole soundtrack to the film in one playlist.

Various artists. Mavka. The Forest Song
Song's name	Author(s)	Singer(s)	Duration
"Krokovee Koleso"		DakhaBrakha, Maksym Berezniuk	1:22
"Mova Vitru" ("Song of the Wind")	Artem Pyvovarov, Khrystyna Soloviy	Artem Pyvovarov, Khrystyna Soloviy	3:45
"Harnaya" ("Beautiful")		Maria Kvitka	3:31
"Vesnyanka" ("Spring Song")		DakhaBrakha, Maksym Berezniuk	0:55
"Pisnia Lisu" ("The Forest Song")	Khrystyna Soloviy	Khrystyna Soloviy	3:35
"Sho z pid Dubu" ("What Is Under the Oak")	DakhaBrakha	DakhaBrakha	3:48

The collection of the orchestra music for the film was presented by Animagrad studio in May 2023. The soundtrack was created by the Ukrainian-Italian team. The team consisted of: the symphonic orchestra Kyiv Virtuosos, Oksana Mukha and Maksym Berezhniuk, and also Italians Dario Vero, Fabio Patriniani, Federico Solacco, Barbad Bayat and Fabricio De Karolis. The album has got 49 instrumental compositions.

The music recording held in the "Forum Studios" studio in Rome. The music collection has got different genres, such as classical, folk, pop-music and original Ukrainian music.

The author of the music is Dario Vero.

== Release ==
The film screening rights for showing the movie in the countries of the Middle East and North Africa were acquired by MENA company, which is a sub-distributor of Walt Disney Studios. Koch Films acquired the rights within the territory of Germany and German-speaking countries. Monolith Films became the distributor in Poland, while Cinemart – in Czech Republic and Slovakia. ACME Film was a distributor in Estonia, Latvia and Lithuania, Cinemundo – in Portugal, Vertical – in Romania, Hungary and Bulgaria, and Blitz company acquired rights for showing the movie within the territory of Serbia, Croatia, Slovenia, North Macedonia, Bosnia and Herzegovina and Montenegro.

After seven years of production, Mavka: The Forest Song premiered in Ukraine on 2 March 2023, and set box office records in the country with its opening, beating out Avatar: The Way of Water (2022) with 189,048 admissions. In the first week of showings, the film's box office totaled ₴24.9 million, which became a box office record among domestic Ukrainian releases. For six weekends at the cinema, 1,011,735 tickets were sold for the film, and the domestic box office totaled ₴127,531,211. For ten weekends at the cinema, 1,144,522 tickets were sold for the film, and the domestic box office totaled ₴143,930,311.

Internationally, the film was released in a number of markets with more than 80 countries having acquired distribution rights. More than 50 countries and territories had set release dates. The film was released in France on March 29, 2023, followed by the Netherlands on April 19, Italy on April 20, Portugal on May 4, Germany, Switzerland and Austria on June 8, Poland, Estonia, Latvia and Lithuania on June 14, and Vietnam on June 16.

In the United States, the film was released on DVD and digital download on August 15 by Shout! Factory. In November 2023, the film started streaming on Hulu. In the United Kingdom, the film was released for a limited time on July 28. Release dates for Canada, Latin America, South Korea, Mongolia, the Czech Republic, Slovakia, and other countries are expected to be announced at a later time.

== See also ==
- Ukrainian animation
