= Otar Koberidze =

Georgian actor, film director and screenwriter

- ოთარ კობერიძე
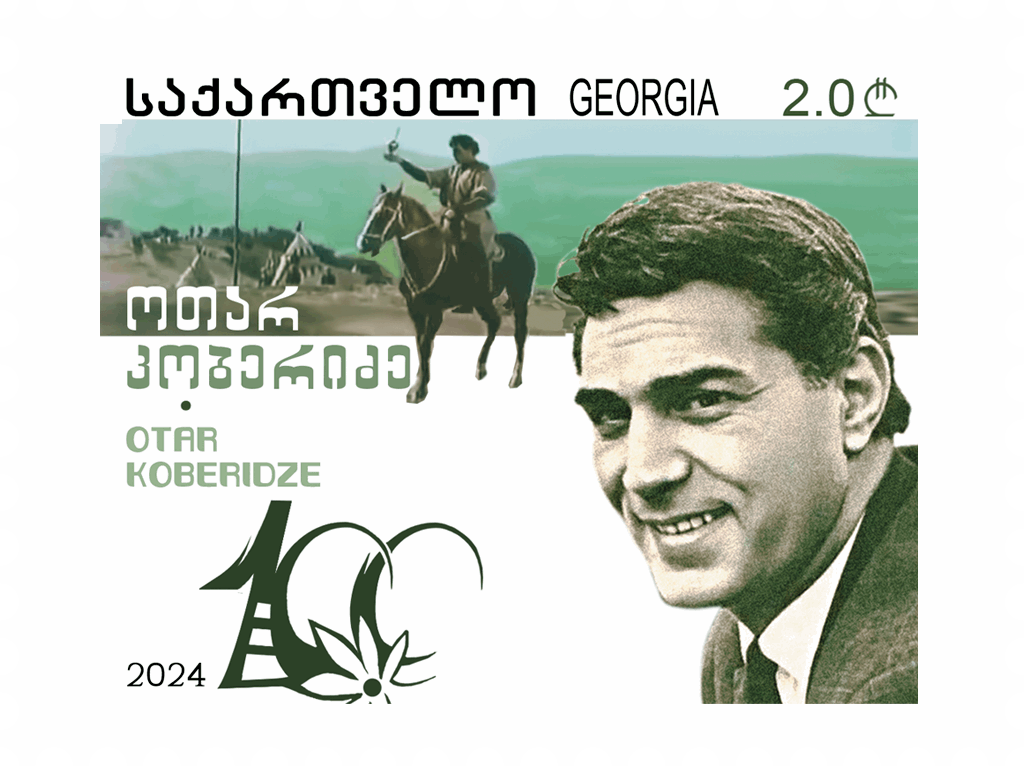
- Koberidze on a 2024 stamp of Georgia
- Born: Otar Leontyevich Koberidze; December 17, 1924; Tiflis, Georgian SSR, Soviet Union (now Tbilisi, Georgia)
- Died: March 9, 2015 (aged 90); Tbilisi, Georgia
- Occupations: Actor, film director, screenwriter
- Years active: 1948–1990s
- Notable work: Bashi-Achuki (1956)
- Spouse: Lia Eliava (m. ?–1998; her death)
- Awards: People's Artist of Georgia (1967)

Otar Leontyevich Koberidze (Georgian: ოთარ კობერიძე; 17 December 1924 – 9 March 2015) was a Georgian actor, film director and screenwriter.

== Biography ==
Koberidze was born in Tiflis, Georgian SSR (now Tbilisi, Georgia), where he graduated from the Rustaveli State Theatre Institute in 1948. He graced the stages of esteemed theaters, including the Drama Theater in Sukhumi and the Marjanishvili Theater in Tbilisi, where his exceptional acting talents shone.

Throughout his career at the film studio Kartuli Pilmi, Otar Koberidze portrayed more than 50 memorable characters, leaving an indelible mark on Georgian cinema. One of his standout roles was as a 17th-century Georgian hero in the 1956 historical action film "Bashi-Achuki." Beyond acting, he also made contributions as a director, overseeing ten films, and as a screenwriter, penning scripts for three productions.

In recognition of his outstanding contributions to the arts, Otar Koberidze was honored with the prestigious title of People's Artist of Georgia in 1967, a testament to his enduring influence in the Georgian cultural landscape.

== Personal life ==
Koberidze was married to the esteemed Georgian actress Lia Eliava (1934–1998).

== Selected filmography ==
- 1948: Keto da Kote as episode
- 1956: Bashi-Achuki as Bashi-Achuki
- 1957: Qalis tvirti as Akaki
- 1958: Other People's Children as Dato
- 1958: Mamluqi as Mahmudi
- 1960: Dge ukanaskneli, dge pirveli as Levani
- 1960: Shetskvetili simgera as Gurami
- 1961: Lyubushka as Grechukha
- 1962: 713 Requests Permission to Land as Henry
- 1963: A Dream Come True as Cosmonaut Ivan Batalov
- 1963: Generali da zizilebi as Navigating Officer Raner Peter
- 1964: Attack and Retreat as Wounded Italian
- 1964: Zgvis shvilebi as Gurami
- 1965: The Tsar's Bride as Grigori Gryaznoy
- 1966: The Little Prince as pilot
- 1967: Qalaqi adre igvidzebs as Tengizi
- 1967: Aladdin's Magic Lamp as The Sultan
- 1967: Commissar as Kirill
- 1968: Spur des Falken as Tasunka-witko
- 1969: The Red Tent as Natale Cecioni
- 1971: Mission in Kabul as Nadir-Khan
- 1971: Daisi as Kiazo
- 1972: Chadziruli qalaqis madziebelni as Edisheri
- 1973: Rustam i Sukhrab as Kavoos
- 1973: Mze shemodgomisa as himself
- 1975: Gaqtseva gatenebisas as Kotsia Eristavi
- 1979: Life Is Beautiful as Alvarado
- 1983: Blue Mountains as movie star (himself)
- 2001: Antimoz iverieli (final film role)

== See also ==
- Queen of Blood
- Mikhail Karyukov
- Battle Beyond the Sun
