= Mavka (band) =

Ukrainian music band

- Origin: Kyiv, Ukraine
- Genres: downtempo electronica ambient ethnic world music folk live-looping trance noise
- Instrument: loop pedal
- Years active: 2015–present
- Labels: Mavka
- Members: Iryna Lazer; Oleksiy Mikriukov; Taras Lazer

Mavka is a Ukrainian band combining ethnic and folk themes with downtempo, electronica and ambient music.

The band was formed in 2013 by a theater actress Iryna Lazer (lead-singer, composer, performer) and Oleksiy Mikriukov (composer) under the initial name Crossworlds.

Collaborating exclusively on-line they managed to release the first mini-album Ivana Kupala Night in 2014. The full-length Day and Night album was released a year later in 2015.

Since then Iryna Lazer began performing live using loop-station, vocal pedals and synthesizers creating polyphonic compositions in Ukrainian and her own invented 'Mermaid' language. In 2015 another musician joined the band due to the growing amount of live performances and the band's name was changed to Mavka.

In 2016 Mavka appeared on a number of festivals including GogolFest and The Day of Street Music. The band also played on Hi5 studio and performed for the plays in Zoloti Vorota Theater.

In 2017 members of Mavka wrote soundtrack and acted in the movie 'The Tale of Money'. Later the band released music video of the official soundtrack 'Night Shadow'.

In 2018 the band started collaborating with the сhildren's сhoir Dyvo (conductor Tetiana Nadolinska). The band and the choir produced ethnic-electronica compositions and some interpretations of the Ukrainian folk songs. Together they gave the concert 'Horovod under the stars' on May 27 on the stage of Kyiv Planetarium.

In 2018 band's leader Iryna Lazer recorded vocals for the vinyl LP album Femininho by King Imagine.

On December 25, 2018, the band presented an exclusive Christmas concert "Carols with the looper" in the cultural center Master Class. The main idea of the concert was for the vocalist to create and perform live the polyphonic carols by herself using only the loop-station.

In 2019 the band created an original version of the song 'Hej Sokoly' for a documentary movie 'The Borderline. Hrubieszów operation' which premiered on May, 28, at the Kyiv International Film Festival "Molodist".

In June 2019 the band started collaborating with the German dancer Véronique Langlott and created the music for her choreography research Folkstrance. The artists presented the performance on July 1 at the cultural platform Izolyatsia.

In August 2019 the band re-released the album Day and Night with the "Mavka" band's name.

The band's music is used as a background in plays 'Sasha, throw out the trash' of Kyiv Academic Young Theatre and in "The People Are Singing" of Royal Exchange Theatre.

== Name ==
The band is named after a Ukrainian mythological female long-haired figure, mavka, that was believed to live in forests, lakes or rivers and appeared only on special holidays during the year. Mavkas could entice or seduce young men to later tickle their victims to death.

== Style and languages ==
The majority of songs is written and performed in the Ukrainian language. They are whether interpretations of Ukrainian traditional compositions or original contemporary pieces. The band is also working on an album with the songs written in 'mermaid' glossolalia as the lead-singer calls it.

== Discography ==
- 2019: Day and Night (LP)
- 2021: Spy
- 2021: Гей, соколи (single)
- 2022: Gagilka. Die Verwandlung
- 2022: Koza (single)
- 2023: Rusalii
- 2024: Кугутання (single, featuring maxandruh)
