= Rayisa Nedashkivska =

- Раїса Недашківська
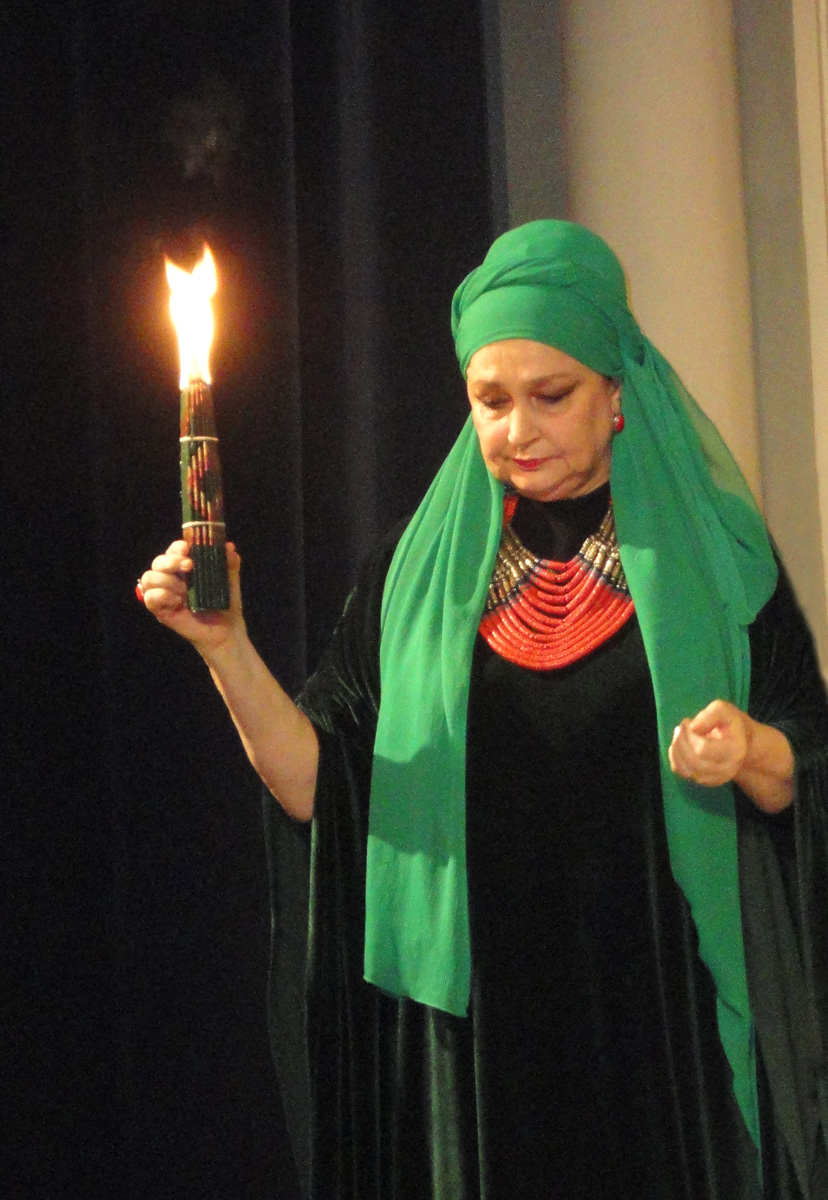
- Nedashkivska in 2014
- Born: Rayisa Nedashkivska; 17 February 1943 (age 82); Malyn, Ukrainian SSR, Soviet Union
- Occupation: Actress
- Years active: 1960-current
- Website: http://www.nedashkivska.com.ua/

Rayisa Nedashkivska (Ukrainian: Раїса Недашківська Rayisa Nedashkivska, Russian: Раиса Недашковская; born 17 February 1943) is a Ukrainian and Soviet-era theater and cinema actress.

In 1993 she was awarded People's Artist of Ukraine.

== Filmography ==
Year	Title
1961	"Forest Song" (Ukrainian: «Лісова пісня»)
1961	"Dmitro Goritsvit" (Ukrainian: «Дмитро Горицвіт»)
1962	"Travel in April" (Ukrainian: «Подорож у квітень»)
1965	The Viper (Ukrainian: «Гадюка»)
1965	The Tsar's Bride (Ukrainian: «Царська наречена»)
1966	"The Formula of Rainbow" (Ukrainian: «Формула райдуги»)
1967	"Commissar" (Ukrainian: «Комісар»)
1968	"Pomylka Onore de Bal'zaka" (Ukrainian: «Помилка Оноре де Бальзака»)
1971	"Lada z krayiny Berendeyiv" (Ukrainian: «Лада з країни Берендеїв»)
1972	"Yul'ka" (Ukrainian: «Юлька»)
1977	"Zaproshennya do tantsyu" (Ukrainian: «Запрошення до танцю»)
1977	"Narodzhena revolyutsiyeyu" (Ukrainian: «Народжена революцією»)
1979	Babylon XX (Ukrainian: «Вавілон ХХ»)
1979	"Vyhidny kontrakt" (Ukrainian: «Вигідний контракт»)
1980	"Strakh" (Ukrainian: «Страх»)
1986	"Karmelyuk" (Ukrainian: «Кармелюк»)
1989	"The Drayman and the King" (Ukrainian: «Биндюжник та Король»)
1990	"Melankholiyny valbs" (Ukrainian: «Меланхолійний вальс»)
1991	"Chudo v krayu zabuttya" (Ukrainian: «Чудо в краю забуття»)
1991	"Narodny Malakhiy" (Ukrainian: «Народний Малахій»)
1991	"Feofaniya, yaka malyu smert'" (Ukrainian: «Феофанія, яка малює смерть»)
1992	"Holos travy" (Ukrainian: «Голос трави»)
1993	"Sad Hetsymans'ky" (Ukrainian: «Сад Гетсиманський»)
1993	"Kaydasheva sim"ya" (Ukrainian: «Кайдашева сім'я»)
1994	"The Road to Sich" (Ukrainian: «Дорога на Січ»)
1995	"Ob"yekt 'Dzhey'" (Ukrainian: «Об'єкт „Джей“»)
1999	"Posmishka zvira" (Ukrainian: «Посмішка звіра»)
2000	"Chorna rada" (Ukrainian: «Чорна рада»)
2001	Молитва за гетмана Мазепу (Ukrainian: Молитва за гетмана Мазепу)
