= Vitaliy Kyreiko =

20th-century Ukrainian composer

Vitaliy Kyreyko
- Віталій Кирейко
- Born: December 23, 1926; Shyroke, Ukrainian SSR, Soviet Union
- Died: October 19, 2016 (aged 89); Kyiv, Ukraine
- Occupations: Composer; teacher

Vitaliy Dmytrovych Kyreyko (Note: Ukrainian: Віталій Дмитрович Кирейко, romanized: Vitalii Dmytrovych Kyreyko) (23 December 1926 – 19 October 2016) was a Ukrainian composer.

He graduated from the Kyiv Conservatory with a degree in composition from L. Revutsky (1944-1949), where he also completed his postgraduate studies (1952). His other accomplishments include: 1949-88 - Lecturer, Associate Professor (1961), Professor (1978) of the Kyiv Conservatory, and Candidate of Art History (1953).

== Selected works ==
Operas:

- The Forest Song, an adaptation of the play by Lesia Ukrainka (1957),
- On Sunday Morning She Gathered Herbs, an adaptation of the novelette by Olha Kobylianska (1966),
- Marko in Hell (1966)
- The Boyar Woman (2003)

Ballets:

- Shadows of Forgotten Ancestors, an adaptation of the novella by Mykhailo Kotsiubynsky (1960),
- The Witch (1967),
- The Orgy (1977), based on the play by Lesia Ukrainka
