= Film.UA =

Easter European film and television production company

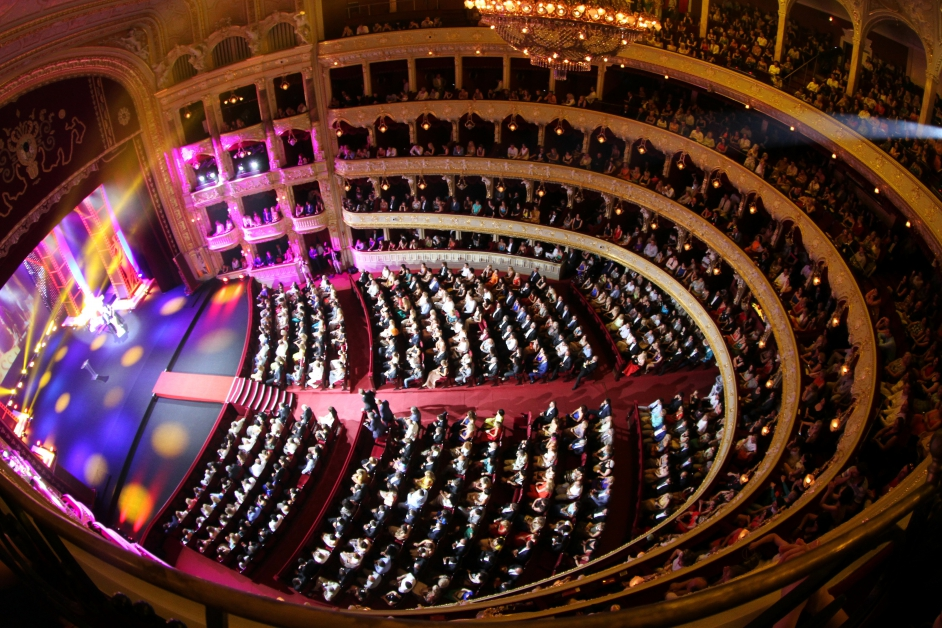
- Odesa International Film Festival (OIFF). Opening Ceremony – July 12, 2013. Opera-House Hall Panorama.
- Company type: Film Studio
- Industry: Cinematography
- Founded: 2002
- Founder: Serhiy Sozanovskyi
- Headquarters: Kyiv, Ukraine
- Revenue: 30,693,400 hryvnia (2025)
- Total assets: 37,066,100 hryvnia (2025)
- Website: film.ua

Film.UA is the largest vertically integrated group of companies in the field of film and television production in Eastern Europe. The film studio was established in November 2002. It is the largest producer of film productions in Ukraine.

== Incidents ==
The company has been accused of homophobia several times. For example, in the series "Threads of Fate" (2016), the mother of the main characters' cousin asked "Who are you dating?" to which he sarcastically replied "A woman", to which the mother responded "Thank God". In another episode, Vanya, the boyfriend of the main character Sasha (her real name - Olia), while working as a nurse, encountered a patient who turned out to be the boyfriend of Lisa (Sasha's half-sister, the antagonist), who said to Ivan: "Do you know what I did to people like you in prison?" to which Ivan replied, "I can imagine". And in the animated film Mavka: The Forest Song, one of the allies of the main antagonist is a stereotypical homosexual who serves the main villains.

== See also ==
- Mavka. The True Myth
- The Stolen Princess
- The Sniffer
