= Ion Ungureanu =

Moldovan actor and politician (1935–2017)

Ion Ungureanu OR
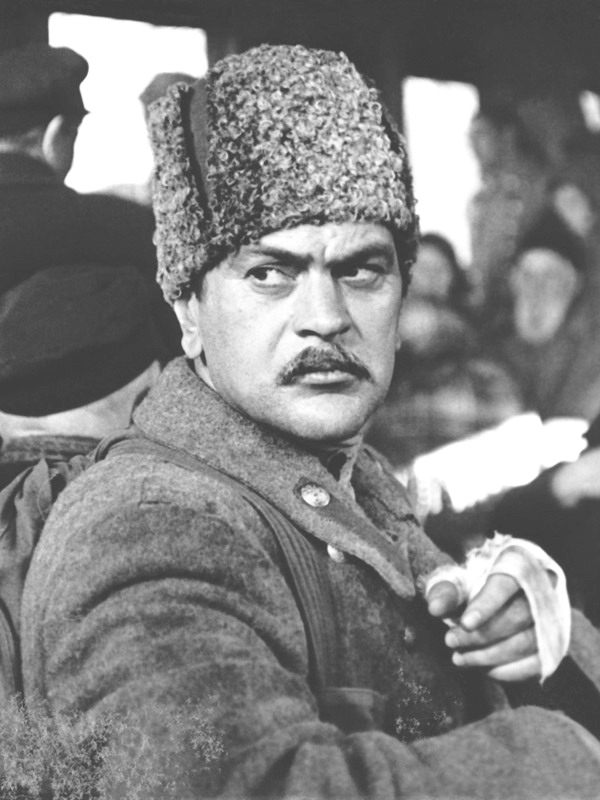
- Ungureanu in Red storm (1971)

1st Minister of Culture and Cults
- In office 6 June 1990 – 5 April 1994
- President: Mircea Snegur
- Prime Minister: Mircea Druc; Valeriu Muravschi; Andrei Sangheli
- Preceded by: Eugen Sobor (as Minister of Culture of the Moldavian SSR)
- Succeeded by: Mihail Cibotaru (as Minister of Culture)

Member of the Moldovan Parliament
- In office 17 March 1990 – 6 June 1990
- Parliamentary group: Popular Front
- Constituency: Căușeni

Personal details
- Born: 2 August 1935 Opaci, Kingdom of Romania
- Died: 28 January 2017 (aged 81) Bucharest, Romania
- Party: Popular Front of Moldova

Ion Ungureanu (2 August 1935 – 28 January 2017) was a Moldovan actor and politician.

== Biography ==
Born in Opaci, Ungureanu served as member of the Parliament of Moldova. As an MP, he was Minister of Culture of Moldova from 1990 to 1994. He was also a leader of the Democratic Forum of Romanians in Moldova.

Ungureanu died on 28 January 2017 in Bucharest at the age of 81.

== Filmography ==
Year	Title	Role	Notes
1962	Man Follows the Sun		
1962	Armageddon		
1963	Travel in April		
1968	Sergey Lazo	Komarovski	
1968	Se cauta un paznic	Sfântul Petru	
1971	Krasnaya metel	George Gytse	
1972	Ofitser zapasa	Ilya Nikolayevich Mariyan	
1972	That Sweet Word: Liberty!	Alberto Ramirez, Communist Senator	
1974	Muzhchiny sedeyut rano	Kirill Armash	
1979	Centaurs	Toroa	
1979	Takeoff	Priest	
1981	Story of an Unknown Man	Pekarskiy	
1984	Tayna villy Greta	Sokdas	
1985	How to Become Happy	Dmitry Sergeevich	
1988	Nedolgiy tanets lyubvi		
1988	Chyornyy koridor		
