= Mavka: The True Myth =

- Directed by: Katia Tsaryk
- Produced by: Iryna Kostiuk; Anna Jelisejeva
- Music by: Dario Vero
- Production company: Film.UA
- Distributed by: Green Light Films; Film.UA
- Release date: 22 February 2026 (Ukraine)
- Running time: 92 minutes
- Country: Ukraine
- Language: Ukrainian

Mavka: The True Myth (Ukrainian: Мавка. Справжній міф) is a 2026 Ukrainian fantasy film directed by Katia Tsaryk filmed by the Film.UA in 2026.

== Plot ==
The film takes place in modern Ukraine and is based on mythology. Mavka is a dangerous nymph in forest lake. Every four years nymphs come to the human world. This time, a group of biology students are in the forest. Among them is Lukian. He meets Mavka not suspecting that she is a nymph. Lukian falls in love. Mavka also loves Lukian. Mavka doesn't want to kill Lukian in forest lake.
