= Izydora Kosach-Borysova =

Ukrainian writer (1888–1980)

- Ізидора Косач-Борисова
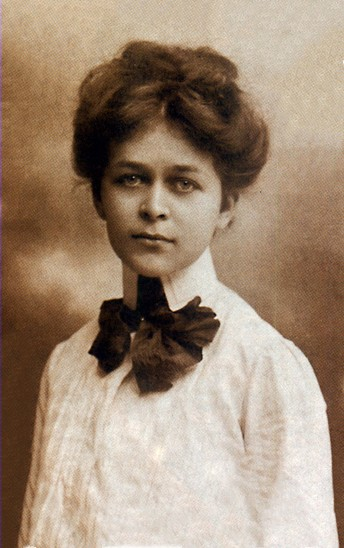
- Izydora Kosach as a young woman
- Born: Izydora Petrivna Kosach; 21 March 1888; Kolodiazhne
- Died: 12 April 1980 (aged 92); Piscataway, New Jersey
- Occupations: Writer; agronomist; plant physiologist; translator; educator
- Mother: Olena Pchilka
- Relatives: Mykhailo Drahomanov (uncle); Lesya Ukrainka (sister); Olha Kosach-Kryvyniuk (sister)

Izydora Petrivna Kosach-Borysova (Ukrainian: Ізидора Петрівна Косач-Борисова; 21 March 1888 – 12 April 1980) was a Ukrainian writer, scientist, educator, and translator.

== Early life and education ==
Kosach-Borysova was born in Kolodiazhne, the daughter of Petro Antonovych Kosach and writer Olena Pchilka. Writers Lesya Ukrainka and Olha Kosach-Kryvyniuk were her older sisters, and Mykhailo Drahomanov was their uncle. She was one of the first women admitted to Kyiv Polytechnic Institute, and graduated from the school's agronomy program in 1911.

== Career ==
Kosach worked in the viticulture industry in Kishinev; after 1917 she taught and researched plant physiology in Kyiv, and worked as a translator of French literature. She was convicted of "counter-revolutionary agitation" in 1937, and spent two years in a labor camp, and at Lukianivska Prison in Kyiv. She left Ukraine with her daughter and her sister Olha in 1944 after she was imprisoned by the Gestapo. She spent time in refugee camps, and moved to the United States in 1949.

Kosach-Borysova wrote memoirs. She and her sister, journalist Olha Kosach-Kryvyniuk, worked with Ukrainian Academy of Arts and Sciences (UVAN) to publish their sister's works on the occasion of Lesya Ukrainka's centenary. She was an honorary member of the Union of Ukrainian Women of America.

== Personal life ==
Kosach married Yuri Hryhorovych Borysov in 1912. They had a daughter, Olga. Her husband died in a Siberian prison in 1941. She died in 1980, at the age of 92, in Piscataway, New Jersey. In 1989, she was posthumously "rehabilitated" by the Supreme Soviet, and soon after her daughter transferred her papers to a Ukrainian archive.
