= Volodymyr Samiilenko =

Ukrainian poet, satirist, dramatist, and translator (1864–1925)

- Володи́мир Іванович Самі́йленко
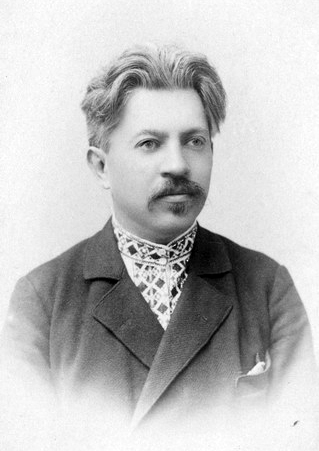
- Born: 3 February 1864; Sorochyntsi, Russian Empire (now Velyki Sorochyntsi, Ukraine)
- Died: 12 August 1925 (aged 61); Boiarka, Ukrainian SSR, Soviet Union (now Ukraine)
- Resting place: Boiarka, Ukraine
- Education: Saint Vladimir Imperial University of Kiev
- Spouse: Olha Oreshko-Yakymenko (m. 1896)
- Children: 4
- Writing career
- Language: Ukrainian
- Period: c. 1886–1925
- Genres: Lyric poetry; satire; drama; translation
- Movement: La Pléiade

Volodymyr Ivanovych Samiilenko (Ukrainian: Володи́мир Іванович Самі́йленко; 3 February [O.S. 22 January] 1864 – 12 August 1925) was a Ukrainian poet, satirist, dramatist, and translator. Samiilenko was best noted as a satirist for his combination of poetry and political humour, and he was praised by intellectual leader Ivan Franko for his usage of lyricism.

Born in modern-day Poltava Oblast to a serf and a landowner, Samiilenko was a polyglot, and began his career in literature and translation while studying in gymnasium. While a student at Saint Vladimir Imperial University of Kiev, Samiilenko became involved with several groups supporting the Ukrainian national revival. Although his works were barred from publication in the Russian Empire, they were frequently published in neighbouring Austria-Hungary, where they received critical acclaim. Samiilenko supported the Ukrainian People's Republic during the Ukrainian War of Independence and fled west to Poland after the Soviet advance, but returned to the country in the last year of his life.

== Early life and studies ==
Volodymyr Ivanovych Samiilenko was born on 3 February [O.S. 22 January] 1864 in the town of Sorochyntsi, in the western Russian Empire (now Velyki Sorochyntsi, in Ukraine's central Poltava Oblast). He was the son of Ivan Lysevych, a landowner, and Oleksandra Samiilenko, a serf, and was raised by Oleksii Trokhymovskyi, a close friend of the family of Nikolai Gogol.

Samiilenko's primary education was in Myrhorod before he studied at Poltava's gymnasium. During his gymnasium studies, Samiilenko expressed a strong interest in literature, and he began to translate historical literature as well as creating works of his own. Samiilenko was a polyglot, speaking nine different languages.

== University activities ==
Samiilenko studied at the Saint Vladimir Imperial University of Kiev (now the Taras Shevchenko National University of Kyiv) from 1884 to 1890. There, he became a member of a literary group known as La Pléiade. Several of the group's members would go on to become leading writers during the late 19th and early 20th centuries, among them Lesya Ukrainka, Olena Pchilka, Mykola Lysenko, and Mykhailo Starytsky. He was also a member of the Textbook Society, an underground literary group supporting the Ukrainian national revival, and the Literary Society, a group founded by Lesya Ukrainka. During his interactions with the latter group, he became acquainted with leading Ukrainian intellectuals such as Ivan Franko, Leonid Hlibov, Borys Hrinchenko, and Mykhailo Kotsiubynsky.

== Writing career ==
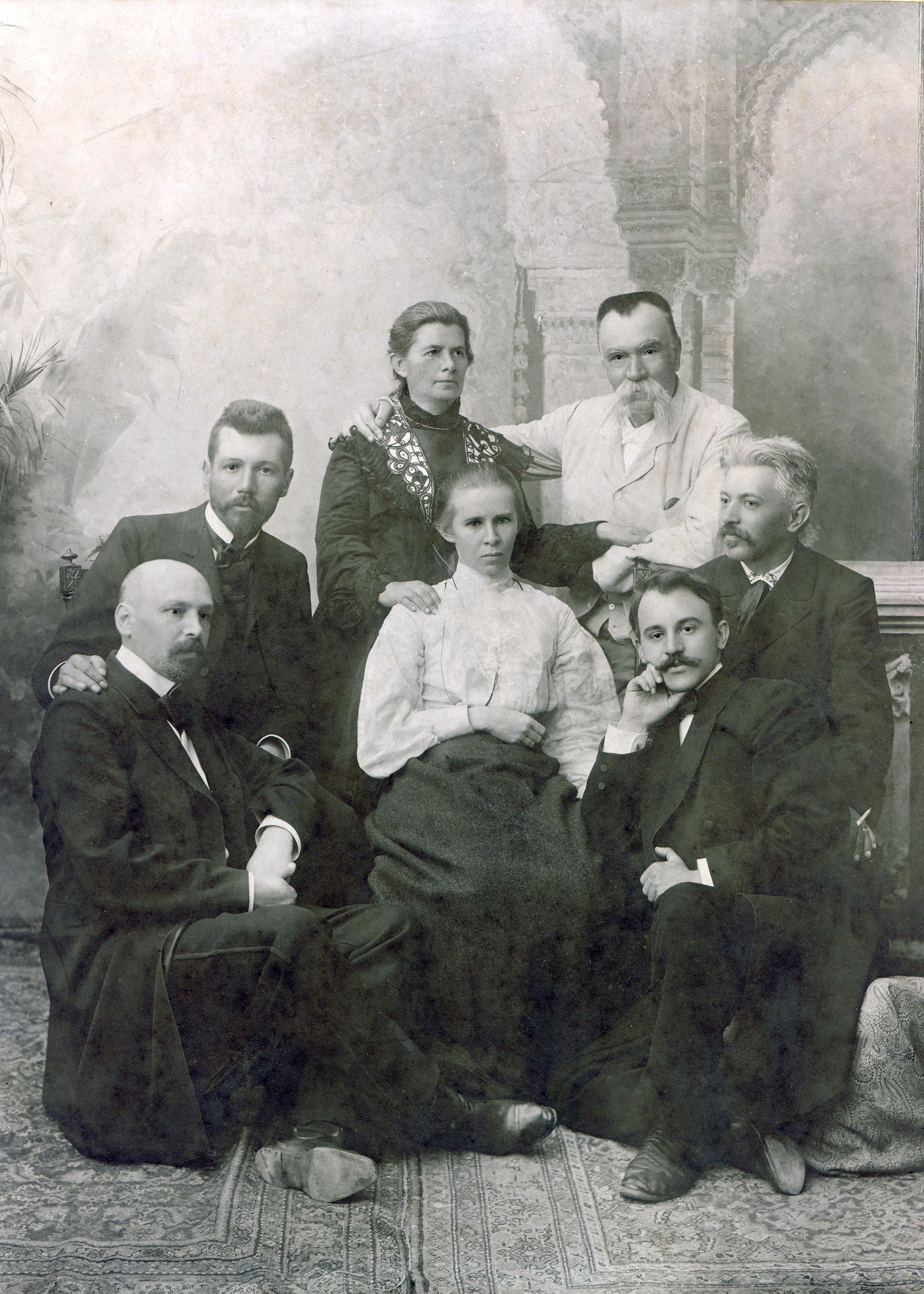
Ukrainian writers at the opening of a monument to Ivan Kotliarevsky in Poltava, 1903. Clockwise from upper left: Vasyl Stefanyk, Olena Pchilka, Mykhailo Starytsky, Samiilenko, Hnat Khotkevych, Lesya Ukrainka, Mykhailo Kotsiubynsky.

Samiilenko first tried to publish his works during his university years, but they were barred from publication by Tsarist censorship authorities. The works would only be officially published in 1886, in the relatively-liberal Austro-Hungarian Empire. In response to the censorship of his works, Samiilenko stopped publishing works in Russia, instead choosing to be published in magazines based in Austria-Hungary. During this period, Samiilenko began to write satire, including El Dorado, How Fun It Is to Live in Ukraine (both 1886), and On the Stove (1898). His satirical works were particularly noted for combining poetry with fierce criticism of the Tsarist government.

In 1896, while in Chernihiv, he married Olha Oreshko-Yakymenko.

Following his graduation from university, Samiilenko first worked as a telegraphist in Kyiv before working at zemstva in Chernihiv, Kuban, and Myrhorod. He also worked in Katerynoslav (now Dnipro).

At the turn of the century, he had also begun to write comedic plays, such as A Drama Without Horilka (1895), The Uncle's Disease (1896), and In Haikhan-Beia (1897), all of which were critically acclaimed. His 1894 dramatic poem, Churaivna, was also noted for its quality.

When the Russian Revolution of 1905 began, Samiilenko travelled to Kyiv and began working as a journalist for newspapers Civic Thought and Rada, as well as a satirical magazine, The Hornet. The lack of income from a career as a journalist, however, led him to return to non-writing work, and he became a notary in the town of Dobrianka.

In 1906, Galician Ukrainian intellectuals Ivan Franko and Mykhailo Mochulskyi created an anthology of Samiilenko's poems, publishing the collection in Lviv with the title of Ukraine. The poems were well received by the Galician intelligentsia as a labour of love by their creator, and Franko particularly noted the lyricism of his works, as well as what he described as his "language culture".

Samiilenko had two sons and two daughters with Olha. The death of his two sons in infancy (the second in 1911) strongly impacted Samiilenko, who wrote to Yevhen Chykalenko, "Now a great grief has befallen me, before which both debts and the loss of all property pale."

He continued to contribute to the Ukrainian intelligentsia in Chernihiv following his move to Dobrianka and the deaths of his sons, often meeting with Kotsiubynsky. With the beginning of the Ukrainian War of Independence Samiilenko offered his support to the government of the Ukrainian People's Republic, and he worked in various ministries until being forced to flee west during the Soviet capture of Chernihiv.

== Life in exile, return to Ukraine, and death ==
Samiilenko, along with the government of Ukraine, fled to Galicia, then under the control of the Second Polish Republic. There, his life continued to be beset by tragedy, as his two daughters both died. As an outlet, Samiilenko again turned to writing, beginning his poem Gaia. The poem would ultimately not be completed before his death, although parts of it were published in the Scientific and Literary Bulletin.

He attempted to return to Ukraine, then under the control of the Ukrainian Socialist Soviet Republic, for two years. His request to do so was granted by the Polish government in 1924, and he subsequently moved to Boiarka.

By this time, however, Samiilenko was effectively penniless. He was working as a freelance translator in an effort to accrue a liveable income, and he was living under the care of Vira Matushevska, the widow of Rada's chief editor Fedir Matushevskyi. He was also suffering from a sarcoma, and his health had been worn down from years of travel.

== Death ==
Samiilenko died on 12 August 1925. In eulogising him, writer Liudmyla Starytska-Cherniakhivska said:

The great patriot Volodymyr Samiilenko was not, I note, a chauvinist. He never displayed his enmity towards other nations. He was an educated person, who knew well foreign languages and loved foreign literature. He was always noted for his culturedness, gentleness, and tolerance.

Samiilenko was buried in Boiarka.
