= Lesya Ukrainka =

Ukrainian poet and writer (1871–1913)

- Леся Українка
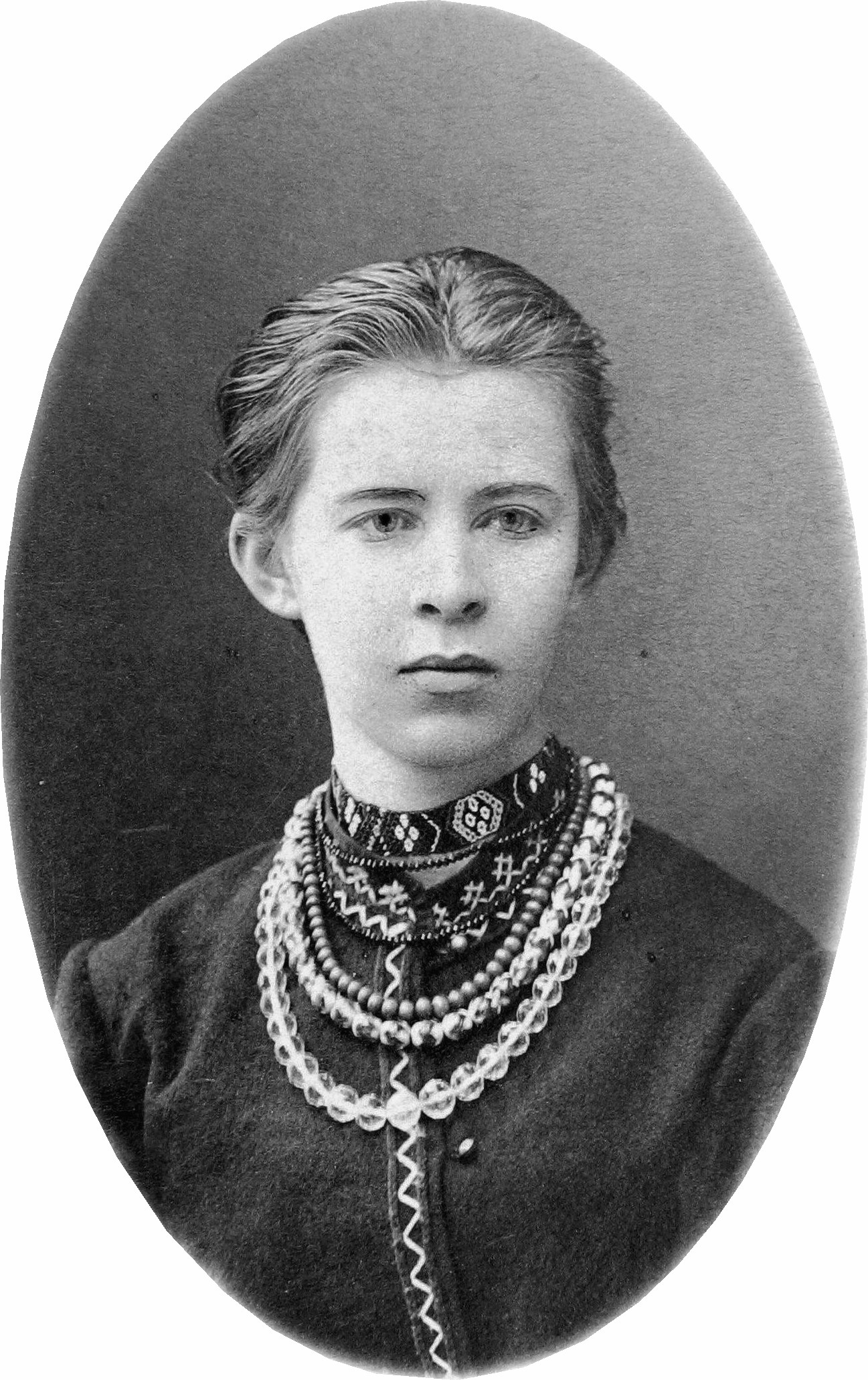
- Lesya Ukrainka in 1886
- Born: Larysa Petrivna Kosach; 25 February 1871; Novohrad-Volynskyi, Volhynia Governorate, Russian Empire
- Died: 1 August 1913 (aged 42); Surami, Russian Empire
- Resting place: Baikove Cemetery, Kyiv
- Occupations: Poet; writer; playwright
- Spouse: Klyment Kvitka (m. 1907)
- Relatives: Olena Pchilka (mother); Olha Kosach-Kryvyniuk (sister); Izydora Kosach-Borysova (sister); Mykhailo Drahomanov (uncle); Yulia Krukovskaya (great-aunt)
- Writing career
- Period: 1884–1913
- Notable works: The Forest Song; On the Wings of Songs
- Movement: Modernism

Lesya Ukrainka (Note: "Ukrainka" literally means "Ukrainian woman" in Ukrainian) (Ukrainian: Леся Українка, romanized: Lesia Ukrainka, pronounced [ˈlɛsʲɐ ʊkrɐˈjinkɐ]; born Larysa Petrivna Kosach, Ukrainian: Лариса Петрівна Косач; 25 February [O.S. 13 February] 1871 – 1 August [O.S. 19 July] 1913) was one of Ukrainian literature's foremost writers, best known for her poems and plays. She was also an active political, civil, and women's rights activist.

Among her best-known works are the collections of poems On the Wings of Songs (1893), Thoughts and Dreams (1899), Echos (1902), the epic poem Ancient Fairy Tale (1893), One Word (1903), and the plays Princess (1913), Cassandra (1903–1907), In the Catacombs (1905), and Forest Song (1911).

== Biography ==
=== Family and education ===
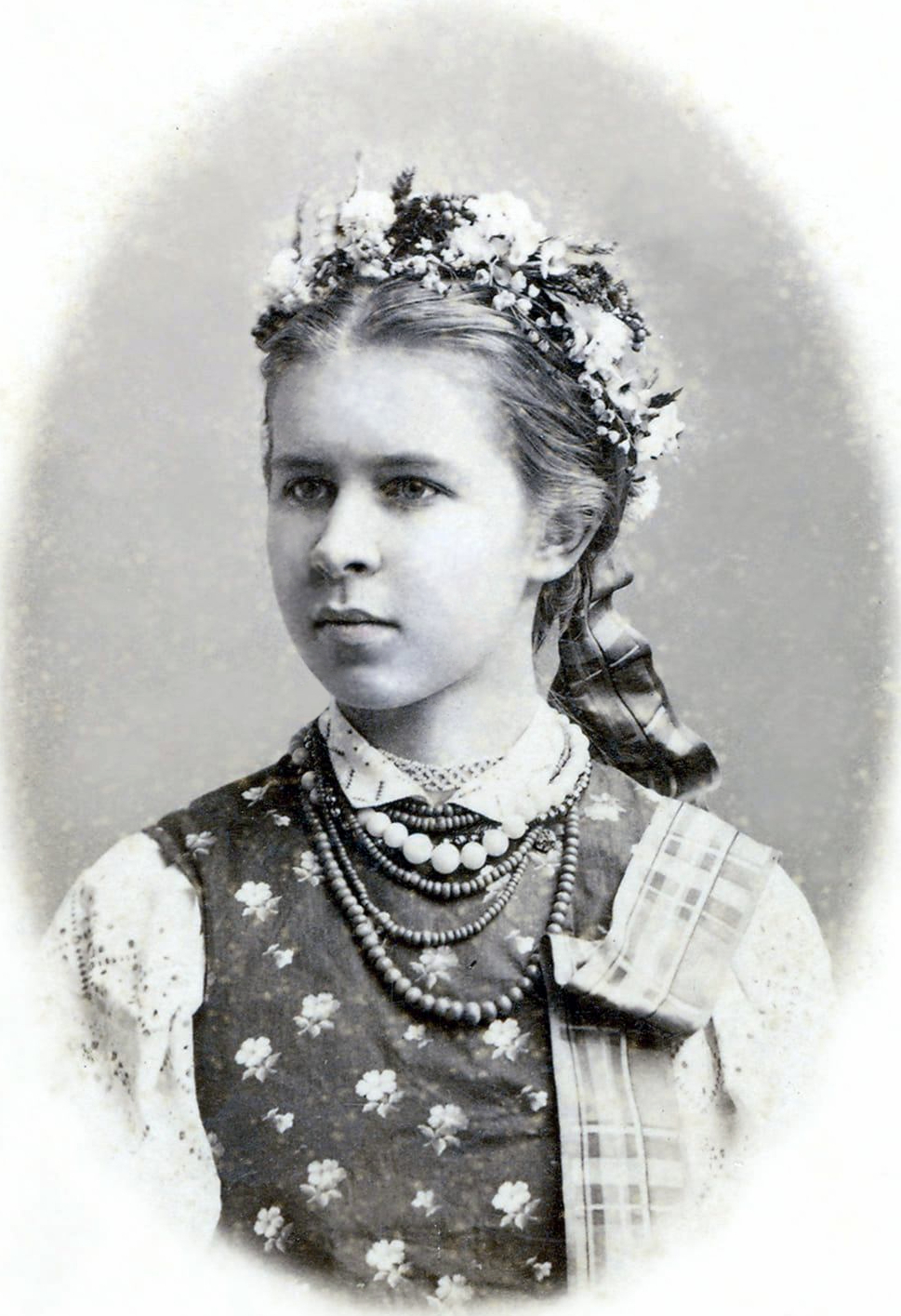
Larysa Kosach in her teenage years

Lesya Ukrainka was born in 1871 in the town of Novohrad-Volynskyi (now Zviahel) in Ukraine. She was the second child of Ukrainian writer and publisher Olha Drahomanova-Kosach, of Greek descent, better known under her pen-name Olena Pchilka. Ukrainka's father was Petro Kosach (from the Kosach family, who in turn are believed to be related to the Kosača noble family), head of the district assembly of conciliators, who came from the northern part of Chernihiv province.

After completing high school in Chernihiv Gymnasium, Ukrainka's father Kosach studied mathematics at the University of Petersburg. Two years later he moved to Saint Vladimir Imperial University of Kiev (now Kyiv University) and graduated with a law degree. In 1868 Kosach married Olha Drahomanova, the sister of his friend Mykhailo Drahomanov, a well-known Ukrainian scientist, historian, philosopher, folklorist, and public figure. Her father was devoted to the advancement of Ukrainian culture and financially supported Ukrainian publishing ventures. Lesya Ukrainka had three younger sisters, Olha, Oksana, and Isydora, and a younger brother, Mykola. Ukrainka was very close with her uncle Drahomanov, her spiritual mentor and teacher, as well as her elder brother Mykhailo, known under the pen name Mykhailo Obachny, whom she called "Mysholosie" after their parents' joint nickname for both of them.

Lesya inherited her father's physical features, eyes, height, and build. Like her father, she was highly principled, and they both held the dignity of the individual in high regard. Despite their many similarities, Lesya and her father were different in that her father had a gift for mathematics, but no gift for languages; conversely, Lesya had no gift for mathematics, but she knew English, German, French, Italian, Greek, Latin, Polish, Russian, Bulgarian, and her native Ukrainian.

Lesya's mother wrote poetry and short stories for children in Ukrainian. She was also active in the women's movement and published a feminist almanac. Ukrainka's mother played a significant role in her upbringing. The Ukrainian language was the only language used in the household, and to enforce this practice, the children were educated by Ukrainian tutors at home to avoid schools that taught Russian as the primary language. Ukrainka learned how to read at the age of four, and she and her brother Mykhailo could read foreign languages well enough to read literature in the original.

=== Literary career ===
==== Early poetry ====
By the time she was eight, Ukrainka wrote her first poem, "Hope," which was composed in reaction to the arrest and exile of her aunt, Olena Kosach, for taking part in a political movement against the tsarist autocracy. In 1879, her entire family moved to Lutsk. That same year her father started building houses for the family in the nearby village of Kolodiazhne. It was at this time that her uncle, Mykhailo Drahomanov, encouraged her to study Ukrainian folk songs, folk stories, and history, as well to peruse the Bible for its inspired poetry and eternal themes. She also was influenced by the well-known composer Mykola Lysenko, as well as the famous Ukrainian dramatist and poet Mykhailo Starytsky.

At age thirteen her first published poem, "Lily of the Valley," appeared in the magazine Zorya in Lviv. It was here that she first used her pseudonym, which was suggested by her mother because in the Russian Empire publications in the Ukrainian language were forbidden. Ukrainka's first collection of poetry had to be published secretly in western Ukraine and secretly brought into Kyiv under her pseudonym. At this time Ukrainka was well on her way of becoming a pianist, but due to tuberculosis of the bone, she did not attend any outside educational establishment. Writing was to be the main focus of her life.

==== Height of literary career ====
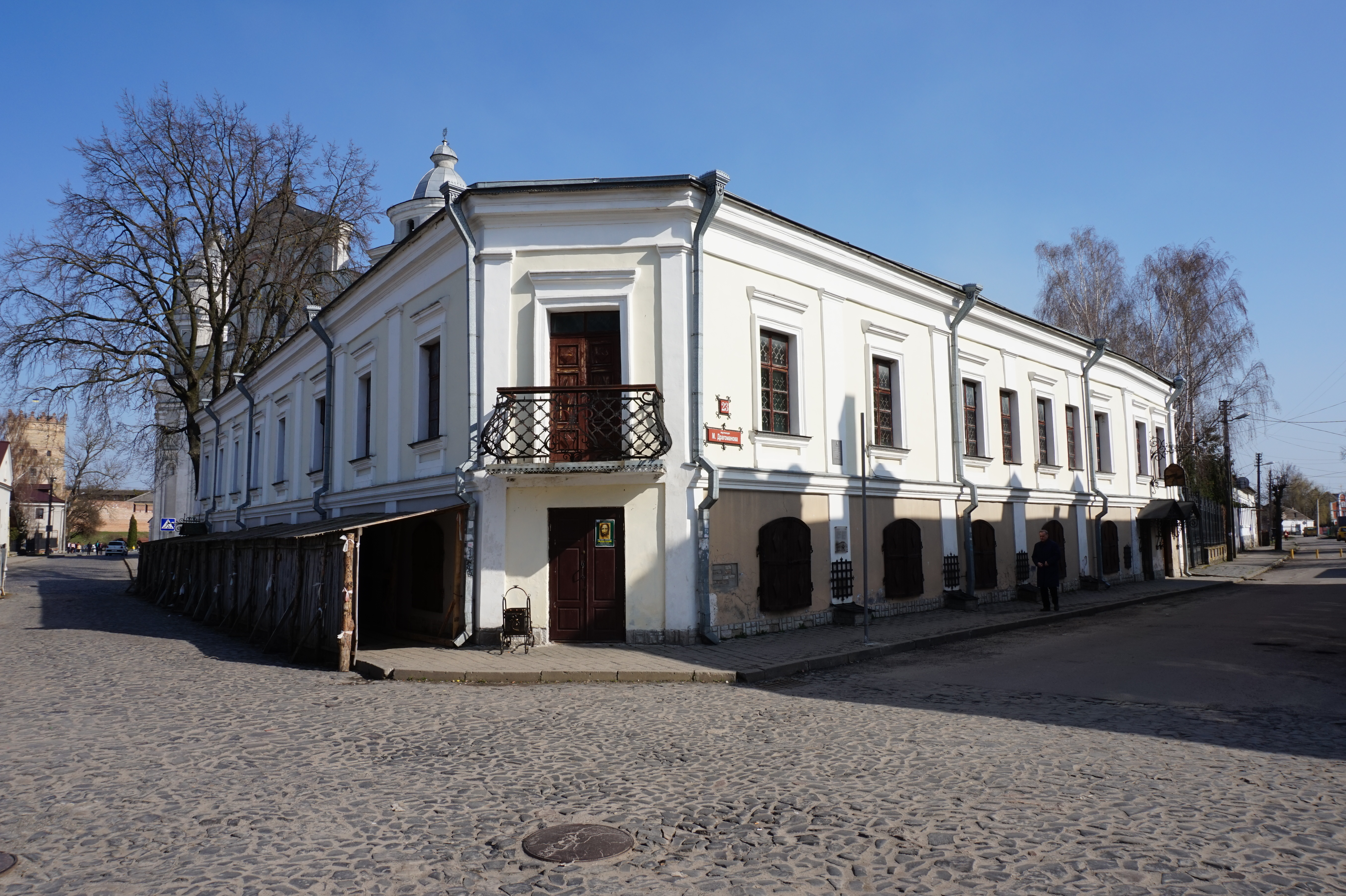
A house in Lutsk, where Lesya Ukrainka and her family lived in 1890-1891

Since the beginning of the 1890s, Ukrainka had been travelling to Poltava region: from the summer of 1893 to the middle of 1906, she would spend almost every summer in Hadiach and nearby Green Grove, where she composed many works, including the legend Robert Bruce, King of Scotland. It was here that Ukrainka befriended the teacher A. S. Makarova, with whom she later corresponded, and the latter left memories of the poet.

The poems and plays of Ukrainka are associated with her belief in her country's freedom and independence. Between 1895 and 1897 she became a member of the Literary and Artistic Society in Kyiv, which was banned in 1905 because of its relations with revolutionary activists. In 1888, when Ukrainka was seventeen, she and her brother organized a literary circle called Pleyada (The Pleiades), which they founded to promote the development of Ukrainian literature and translation of foreign classics into Ukrainian. The organization was based on the French school of poesy, the Pleiade. Their gatherings took place in different homes and were joined by Mykola Lysenko, Petro Kosach, Kostiantyn Mykhalchuk, Mykhailo Starytsky, and others. One of the works they translated was Nikolai Gogol's Evenings on a Farm Near Dykanka.

Taras Shevchenko and Ivan Franko were the main inspiration of her early poetry, which was associated with Ukrainka's loneliness, social isolation, and longing for the Ukrainian nation's freedom. Her first collection of poetry, Na krylakh pisen' (On the Wings of Songs), was published in 1893. Since Ukrainian publications were banned by the Russian Empire, this book was published in Western Ukraine, which was part of Austria-Hungary at the time, and smuggled into Kyiv.

==== Later career ====
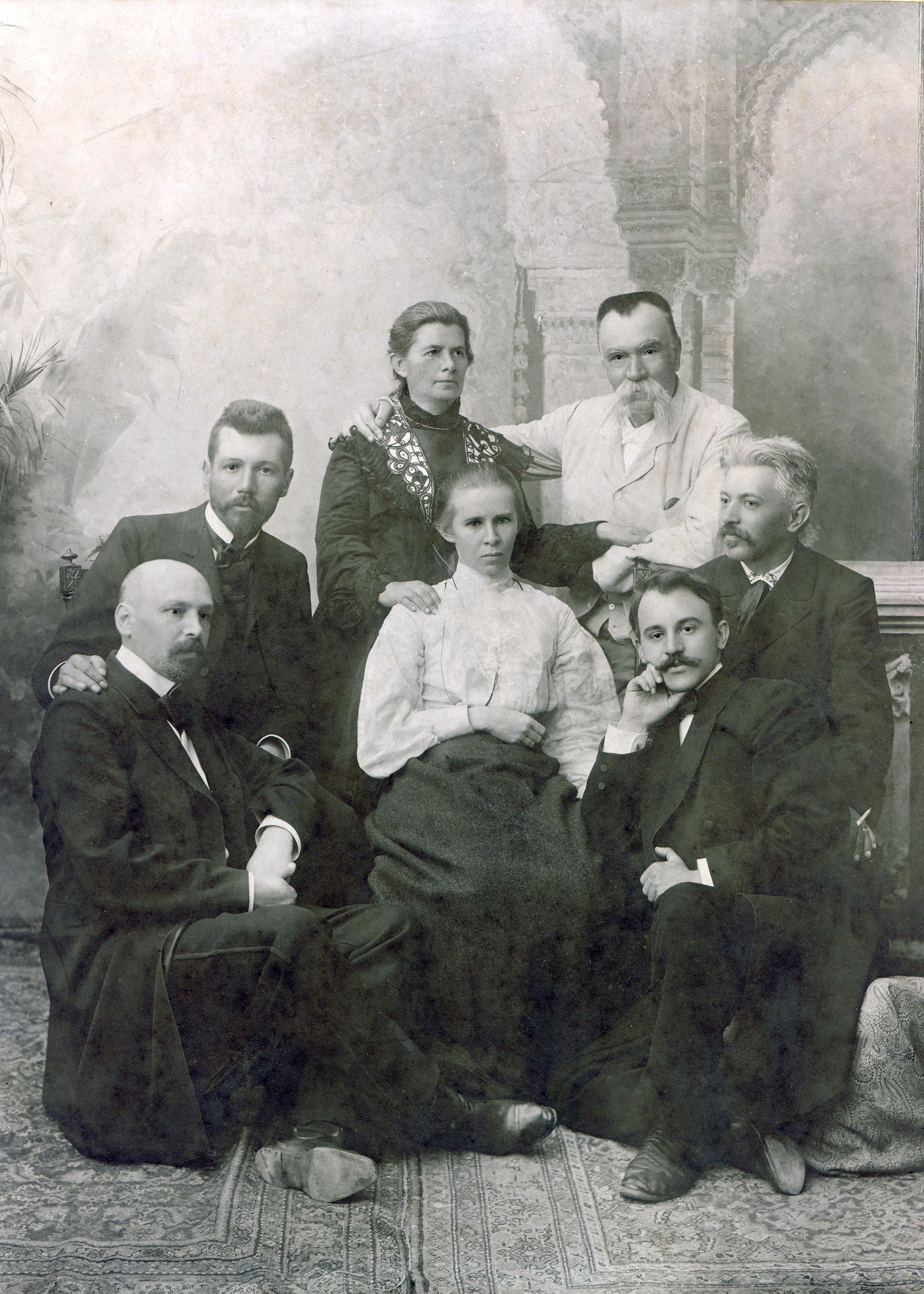
A group of Ukrainian writers gathered in Poltava to inaugurate a monument to Ivan Kotliarevsky. From left: Mykhailo Kotsiubynsky, Vasyl Stefanyk, Olena Pchilka, Lesya Ukrainka, Mykhailo Starytsky, Hnat Khotkevych, Volodymyr Samiilenko

Ukrainka's illness made it necessary for her to travel to places where the climate was dry, and, as a result, she spent extended periods of time in Germany, Austria, Italy, Bulgaria, Crimea, the Caucasus, and Egypt. She loved experiencing other cultures which was evident in many of her literary works, such as The Ancient History of Oriental Peoples, originally written for her younger siblings. The book was published in Lviv, and Ivan Franko was involved in its publication. It included her early poems, such as "Seven Strings," "The Starry Sky," "Tears-Pearls," "The Journey to the Sea," "Crimean Memories," and "In the Children's Circle."

Ukrainka also wrote epic poems, prose dramas, prose, several articles of literary criticism, and several sociopolitical essays. She was best known for her plays Boyarynya (1914; The Noblewoman), a psychological tragedy centred on the Ukrainian family in the 17th century and which refers directly to Ukrainian history, and Lisova pisnya (1912; The Forest Song), the characters of which include mythological beings from Ukrainian folklore.

From 1901 to 1903, she resided at Villa Adriana (Natalia) in Sanremo, Italy, located at Corso Felice Cavallotti, 112. On May 28, 1998, a memorial plaque was unveiled on the wall of the house. The initiative was carried out by Italian researcher Marina Moretti in cooperation with members of the Ukrainian community. The plaque bears an inscription in Italian and Ukrainian stating that Lesya Ukrainka lived in the villa during the years 1901–1903. The Italian text reads:

In questa villa nel 1901-1903 abitò la poetessa Lesja Ukrainka, appassionata interprete dello spirito nazionale ukraino.

Lesya Ukrainka actively opposed Russian tsarism and was a member of Ukrainian Marxist organizations. In 1901, she gave the Austro-Marxist Mykola Hankevich a Ukrainian translation of The Communist Manifesto made by "her comrades from Kyiv". She was briefly arrested in 1907 by tsarist police and remained under surveillance thereafter.

=== Personal life ===
==== Sexuality ====
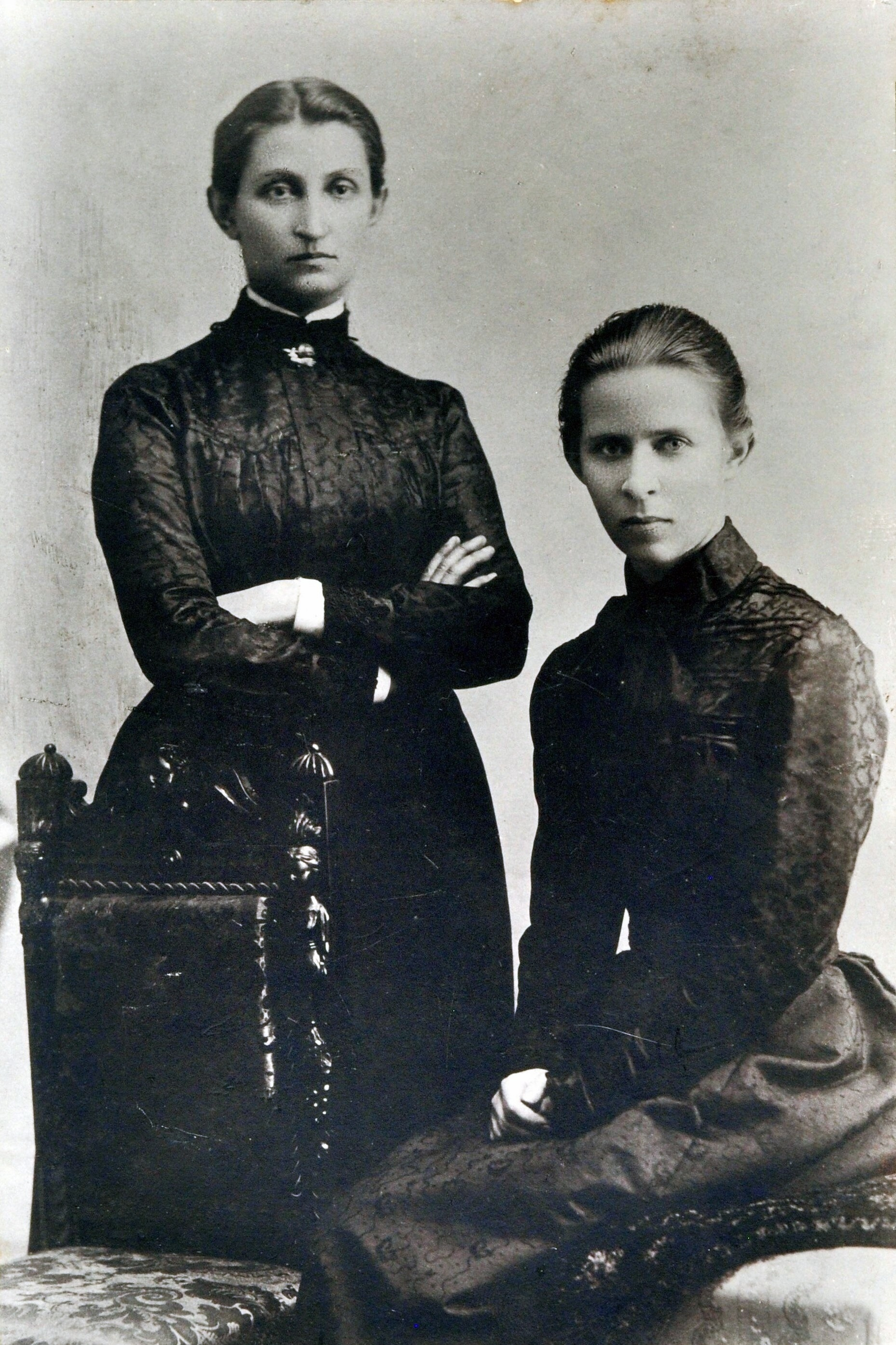
Lesya Ukrainka and Olha Kobylianska, 1901

Lesya Ukrainka's sexuality has been described as "spark[ing] debate among literary scholars for decades" by author Maryna Kulakova, particularly her relationship with Olha Kobylianska. The two began corresponding through writing in 1891, and after a 1901 meeting in Chernivtsi, began writing intimate passages to one another. Lesya Ukrainka grew closer to Kobylianska after Miaržynski's death, while Kobylianska was dealing with a rejection by Osyp Makovei, who was uninterested in marriage.

The correspondence between Lesya Ukrainka and Olha Kobylianska led the two to develop a gender-neutral language, referring to one another as "someone" (Ukrainian: хтось, romanized: khtos) in order to express feelings of love. This language has been compared to Anne Lister's diaries by professor Anna Dżabagina. Dżabagina additionally notes that the usage of this coded language was for political reasons; Lesya Ukrainka, who lived in the Russian Empire, was less likely to overtly express her sexuality than Kobylianska, who lived in Austro-Hungarian Empire. The former's letters were nonetheless explicit in noting her desire for physical contact, and she wrote on one occasion that she

thought of someone and wanted to talk to someone [...] and most of all to sit, half-undressed, on someone's bed while someone is lying there already wrapped in a scarf under the duvet and feels a little but sleepy, but also doesn't quite want to sleep, and has black eyes with golden sparks. So that someone would know that someone needs someone to keep their spirits up, because someone's spirit is very often burdened, though not with the same thing it was burdened with before, but something wider and also heavier...

The relationship between Kobylianska and Lesya Ukrainka has been referred to as a "lesbian phantasy" by literary scholar Solomiya Pavlychko. Increased attention to the relationship between the two women has sparked homophobic backlash from certain sectors of Ukrainian academia, as well as what Dżabagina refers to as "straightwashing". Oksana Zabuzhko, for example, has claimed that the correspondence was simply the literary conventions of the time, and that any intimate character is a result of reinterpretation by modern, "unprepared" readers.

==== Partnerships and marriage ====
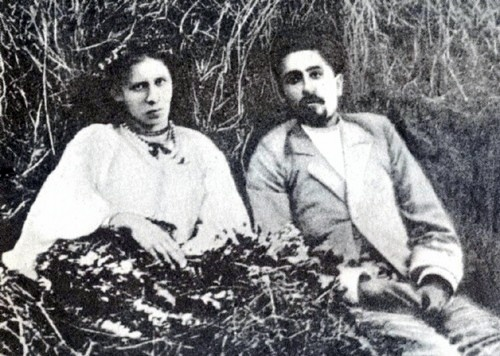
Lesya Ukrainka and Siarhej Miaržynski, 1898

Lesya's first romantic interest was Maksym Slavinsky, who first visited the Kosach family house in 1886 on the invitation of Dmytro Pylchykov and her brother Mykhailo. In 1891 Slavinsky aided Lesya in revising her translations from Heinrich Heine. One of her poems published in 1893 is dedicated to Slavinsky.

Ukrainian linguist Ahatanhel Krymsky was claimed to have courted Lesya while a student in Kyiv, but their romance turned to be one-sided.

In 1897, while being treated in Yalta, Lesya met Siarhej Miaržynski, an official from Minsk who was also receiving treatment for tuberculosis. The two fell in love, and her feelings for Miaržynski were responsible for showing a different side of herself. Examples include "Your Letters Always Smell of Withered Roses," "To Leave Everything and Fly to You," and "I'd Like to Wind around You Like Ivy," which went unpublished in her lifetime. Miaržynski died with Ukrainka at his bedside on 3 March 1901. She wrote the entire dramatic poem "Oderzhyma" ("The Possessed") in one night on his deathbed.

In 1907, Lesya Ukrainka married Klyment Kvitka, a court official, amateur ethnographer and musicologist, whom she had first met in 1898. Their marriage ceremony took place on 7 August in the Ascension Church at Demiivka in Kyiv. They settled first in Crimea, then moved to Georgia. Due to Kvitka's insufficient salary, Lesya had to finance their expenses from her dowry. The relationship became strained following rumours of Kvitka's adultery, and Lesya's increasing isolation as a result of her illness. After her death, Kvitka became the inheritor of Lesya's literary estate and received 50% of royalties for publication of her works. He produced a number of memoirs about their life, but never allowed them to be published.

==== Illness ====
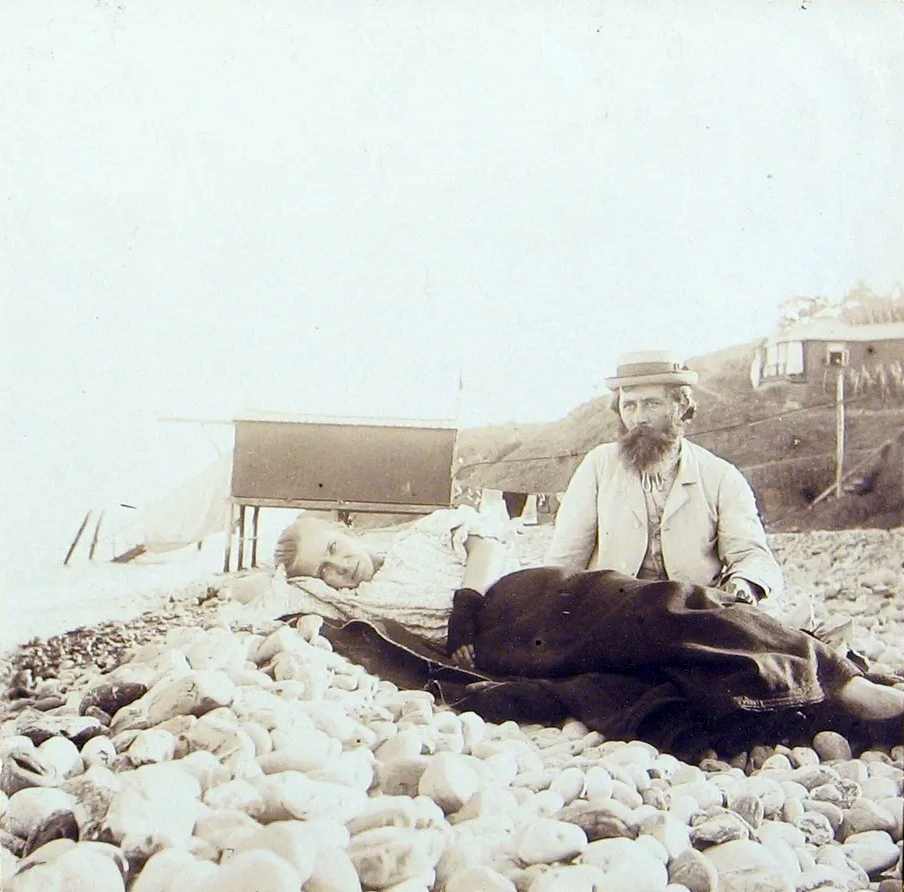
Lesya and her brother Mykhailo during a visit to Crimea, 1897

The first signs of Lesya's illness dated to September 1882, when she developed a painful lump on her left hand. At first doctors believed it to be caused by rheumatism. After the girl started suffering from pains in her right leg, her parents consulted the famous Kyiv doctor Friedrich Mering, who mistakenly diagnosed the ailment as anaemia. However, the prescribed treatment failed to produce effect. Finally, in October 1883 a consilium in Kyiv confirmed the diagnosis of bone tuberculosis. It has been theorized, that the illness could have been caused by a bad cold, which nine-year-old Lesya caught on Epiphany feast in 1881, while attending the blessing of water ceremony.

On 26 October 1883 Lesya underwent an operation, during which several bones affected by the disease were removed from her hand. However, in December the girl started to suffer from swelling in her right leg, and the doctor prescribed a gypsum bandage, which made Lesya unable to walk. In May 1888, following another consilium in Warsaw, Lesya received a leg prosthesis, which allowed her to walk unaided. Afterwards she travelled to the mud baths of Khadzhibey Estuary for treatment. A system of weights was installed at her home in order to exercise the affected leg. Despite this, her condition worsened, and the 19-year old would even resort to folk medicine in order to feel better. Eventually, Lesya's health improved - she gained weight, could walk without crutches, using a staff, and was able to fasten her shoes without help from others.

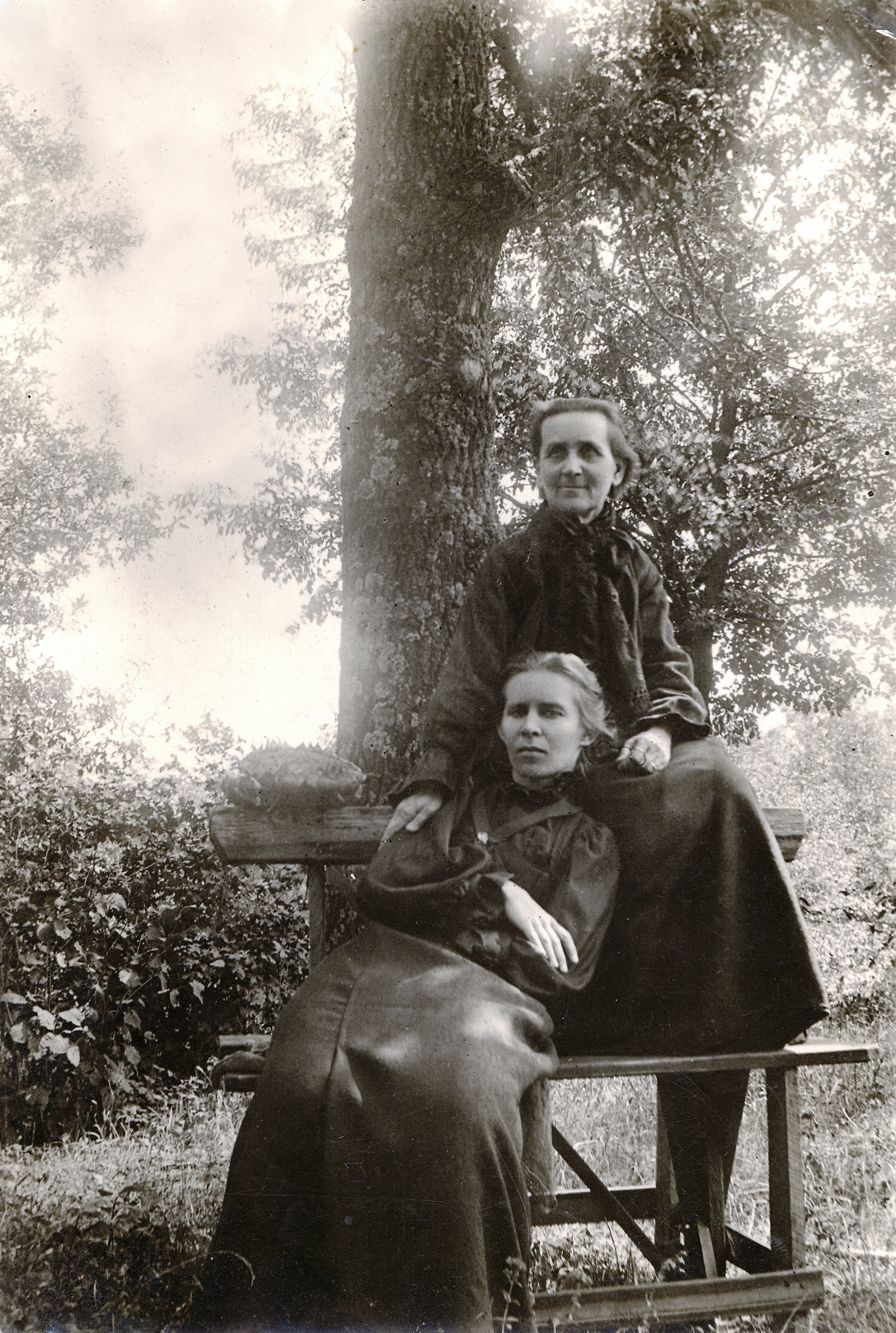
Lesya Ukrainka posing with her aunt Oleksandra Shymanovska, 1906

In 1891, despite receiving mud treatment in Saky, Lesya once again had to use crutches, and started suffering from insomnia. On advice of Vienna doctor Theodor Billroth, in March 1891 she had a special apparatus installed on her affected leg. This made her able to walk unaided once again, but the steel support would make the girl swiftly tired while walking. Lesya's somatic symptoms were treated by her uncle Oleksandr Drahomanov, a psychiatrist. In 1896 she had iodophor injected into her affected joint, surviving the painful operation without anaesthesia. However, the effect of that treatment turned to be short-lived. In December 1898 Lesya received from Ernst von Bergmann, a doctor from Berlin, an appointment for a new operation. Preparing for the procedure, the poet travelled to Yalta, where a local doctor diagnosed her with hysteria and prescribed hydrotherapeutic treatment, which allowed to improve her condition.

On 26 January 1899 Lesya had her leg joint operated in Berlin. The intervention had a positive result, and soon thereafter she was able to walk with crutches. In the summer of 1901 the poet travelled to Burkut in the Hutsul region, and stayed there for several weeks. During that time her health improved: she gained weight, her coughing subsided and her throat stopped bleeding. During the following years she travelled for treatment to Sanremo and consulted with Swiss doctors Hermann Eichhorst and Hermann Sahli. In September 1903 Lesya and her husband travelled to Georgia, and by next spring her health once again improved.

In November 1907, during her stay in Yalta, Lesya was diagnosed with tuberculosis of the bladder. On the advice of Berlin surgeon James Israel, she travelled to Egypt, visiting the country three times in 1909, 1911 and 1913. In order to finance her treatment there, Lesya gave private lessons to children. According to memoirs of contemporaries, during that time she could move rather freely, but suffered from a limp, and always wore a glove on her left hand.

=== Death and funeral ===
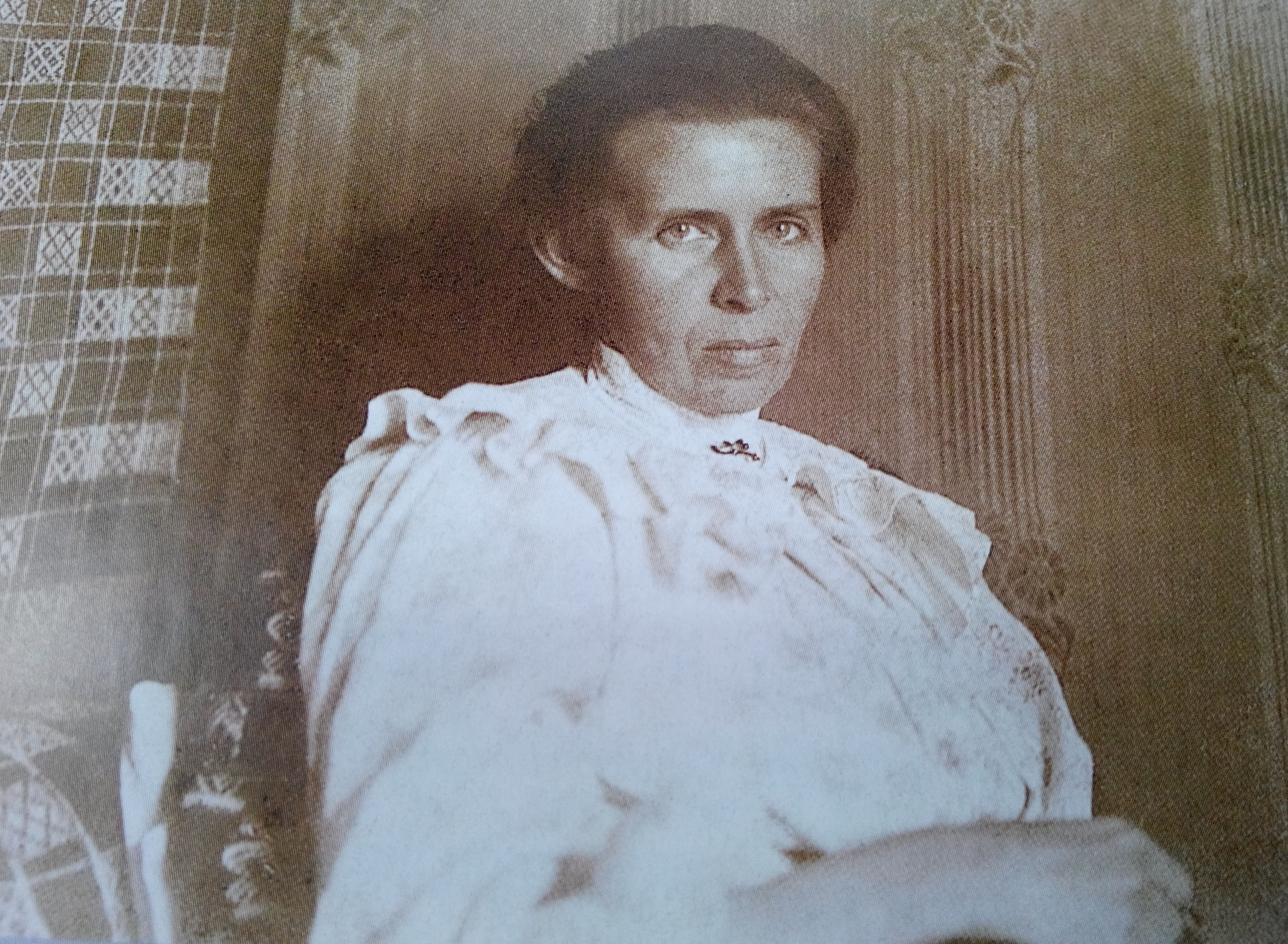
Lesya Ukrainka's last photo, May 1913

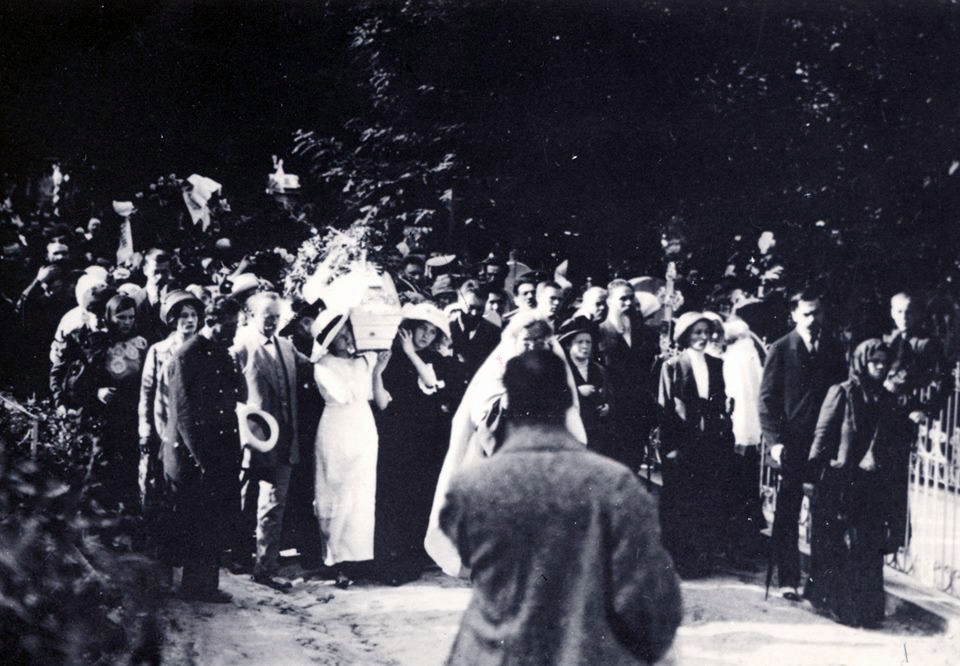
Lesya Ukrainka's funeral at Baikove Cemetery in Kyiv

After returning from her annual trip to a health resort in Egypt in May 1913, Ukrainka visited her family and friends in Kyiv. Her old friend Liudmyla Starytska-Cherniakhivska recalled, that it was clear that this meeting would be the last: due to physical weakness, the poet could barely rise from her bed, but she still preserved interest for civic and cultural life, and shared her creative plans. After arriving to the Caucasus through Odesa, Ukrainka joined her husband in Kutaisi. There she continued dictating her poems and wrote several letters to friends and family.

Suffering from fever caused by tuberculosis of the bone, lungs and kidneys, Lesya was tended to by her mother and sisters, who came to assist her husband. On 23 July, on advice of a doctor, the family decided to transfer the terminally ill poet to the resort village of Surami, which was considered to have a better climate. Three days later, Lesya's state deteriorated further, and on 30 July she started refusing food. Having learned about the severity of her illness, Olha Kosach-Kryvyniuk set on a journey from Ukraine to support her family, but arrived only a few hours after her sister's death. Lesya Ukrainka died in the early hours of 1 August 1913, cared by her mother until the last moments.

On 7 August 1913, crowds of people gathered at Kyiv railway station to meet the train which brought the body of the poet back to Ukraine. On the same day, a funeral march was organized to Baikove Cemetery. Despite a police ban on gatherings, many members of the procession were able to lay wreaths and flowers on Ukrainka's grave.

== Creative activity ==
=== Poetry ===
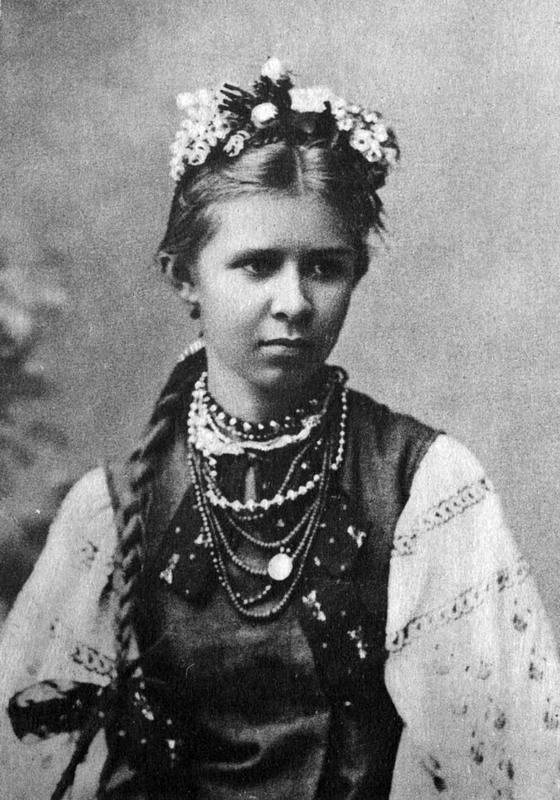
Lesya Ukrainka posing in a folk dress, 1888

Ukrainka began to write poetry at the age of nine: the poem "Hope" ["Надія"] was written under the influence of the news about the fate of her aunt Olena Antonivna Kosach (married to Teslenko-Prykhodko), who had been exiled for participating in the revolutionary movement. In 1884 the poems "Lily of the Valley" ["Конвалія"] and "Sappho" ["Сапфо"] were first published in Lviv magazine "Zorya". That was the first time Larysa Kosach was published under her pen name, Lesya Ukrainka. In the following reprints, Lesya added a dedication to her brother to the poem "Sappho": "Dearest Shura Sudovshchikova, remember." In 1885 a collection of her translations from Mykola Gogol (made together with Mykhailo) was published in Lviv.

Lesya Ukrainka's literary activity revived in the mid-1890s when the Kosachs moved to Kyiv, and she became a co-founder of the Pleiades literary circle, surrounded by the Lysenko and Starytsky families. At the request of the Pleiades, in 1889 she compiled her famous List of World Literature for translation. In 1892, Heinrich Heine's Book of Songs was published in Lviv, translated by Lesya Ukrainka together with M. Slavinsky. The first collection of her original poems "On the Wings of Songs" appeared in Lviv (1893), the second edition in Kyiv (1904), the second collection "Thoughts and Dreams" (1899), the third "Reviews" (1902) – in Chernivtsi.

After that, Lesya Ukrainka worked for a decade and created more than a hundred poems, half of which were never published during her lifetime.

Lesya Ukrainka entered the canon of Ukrainian literature primarily as a poet of courage and struggle. Her thematically rich lyrics are somewhat conditionally (due to the relationship of motives) divided into personal, landscape, and civic. The main themes of her early lyrical poetry are the beauty of nature, love for her native land, personal experiences, the purpose of the poet and the role of the poetic word, social and social motives. In her first works the influences of Taras Shevchenko, Panteleimon Kulish, Mykhailo Starytsky, and Heine are noticeable, the clear influences of Olena Pchilka and Mykhailo Drahomanov (pseudonym – Ukrainian) on the choice of motives are visible.

The poem "Contra spem spero!" (1890) characterizes the ancient understanding of valor (arete), brilliant mastery of mythological illusions, self-creation of a woman warrior. It is this aspect of creativity for many years which determined the tone of her scientific "forestry". This is the main motive of the poems "To Comrades", "Comrades in Memory", "Sinner", "Slavus – Sclavus", "Fiat nox", "Epilogue" and many others.

The motif of freedom takes on a variety of colors: from disobedience to the traditional understanding of the empire to the individual choice of modus vivendi, which means discovering the truth and serving it. Betrayal on any level is identified with tragedy, and with the act of Medea. The lyrics of thirst and hidden triumph were associated with the inability to realize their love, exposing the scheme of chivalrous love. The lyrical heroine is a knight who sings to her lady of the heart. The eroticism of such poems as "I would like to embrace you like an ivy", "Your letters always smell of withered roses" are mystical praises in honor of the divine mistress.

=== Drama ===
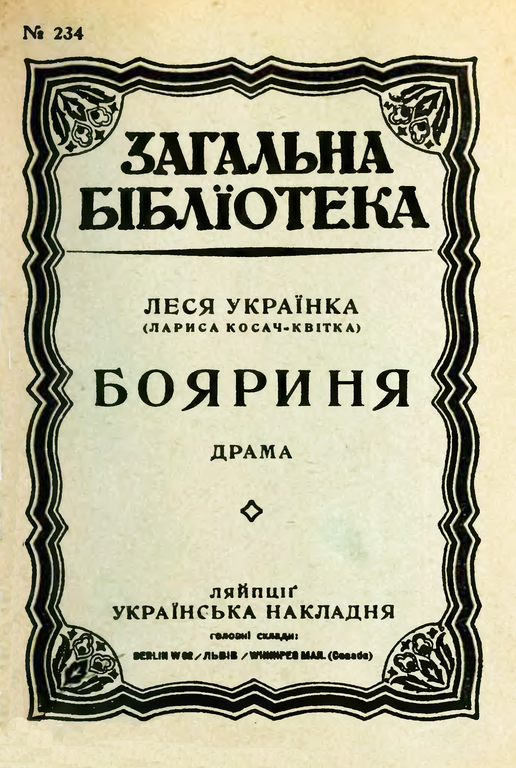
A publication of Lesya Ukrainka's drama The Noblewoman

In the second half of the 1890s, Kosach turned to drama. Her first play, The Blue Rose (1896), from the life of the Ukrainian intelligentsia, expands on the theme of Ukrainian drama, which until then had portrayed mostly the peasantry. The drama testified to Lesya Ukrainka's entry into the modern world — first of all, the world of the symbol — and her rather free "feeling." To cover the topic of human norm and abnormality, the writer thoroughly prepared and studied the issues, consulted with a psychiatrist Oleksandr Drahomanov. The philosophical discourse of drama, imposing on Hauptmann's work, presents not only madness as a form of freedom, but also a certain longing for the body.

=== Prose ===
Fiction has a special place in Lesya Ukrainka's literary heritage. The first stories from rural life ("Such is her fate", "Holy evening!", "Spring songs") are connected in content and language with folk songs. In the genre of fairy tales written "Three Pearls", "Four tales of green noise", "Lily", "Trouble will teach", "Butterfly". The stories "Pity" and "Friendship" are marked by sharp drama. The Ukrainian woman's death story "Ekbal Hanem", intended to depict the psychology of an Arab woman, remained unfinished.

== Research of life and creativity ==
Lesya Ukrainka's life and work are studied by the Lesya Ukrainka Research Institute.

- Lesya Ukrainka Museum in Kyiv
- Lesya Ukrainka Museum in Kolodyazhne
- Lesya Ukrainka Museum in Zviahel
- Lesya Ukrainka Museum in Surami
- Lesya Ukrainka Museum in Yalta
- Museum of the Kosach family in Zviahel

== Legacy ==
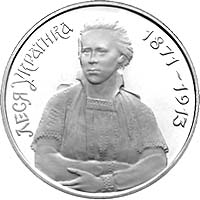
Ukrainian karbovanets depicting Lesya Ukrainka

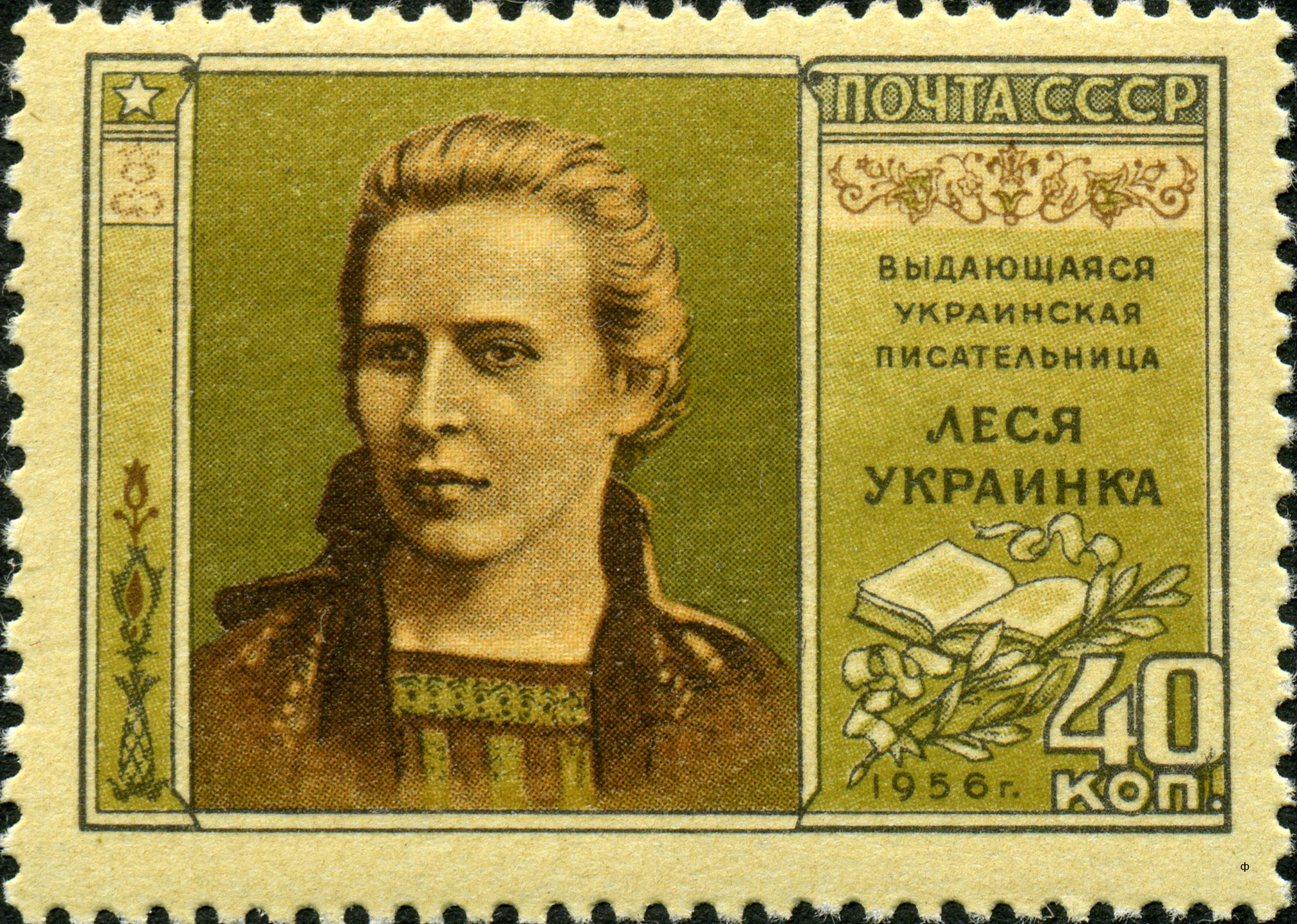
1956 USSR stamp

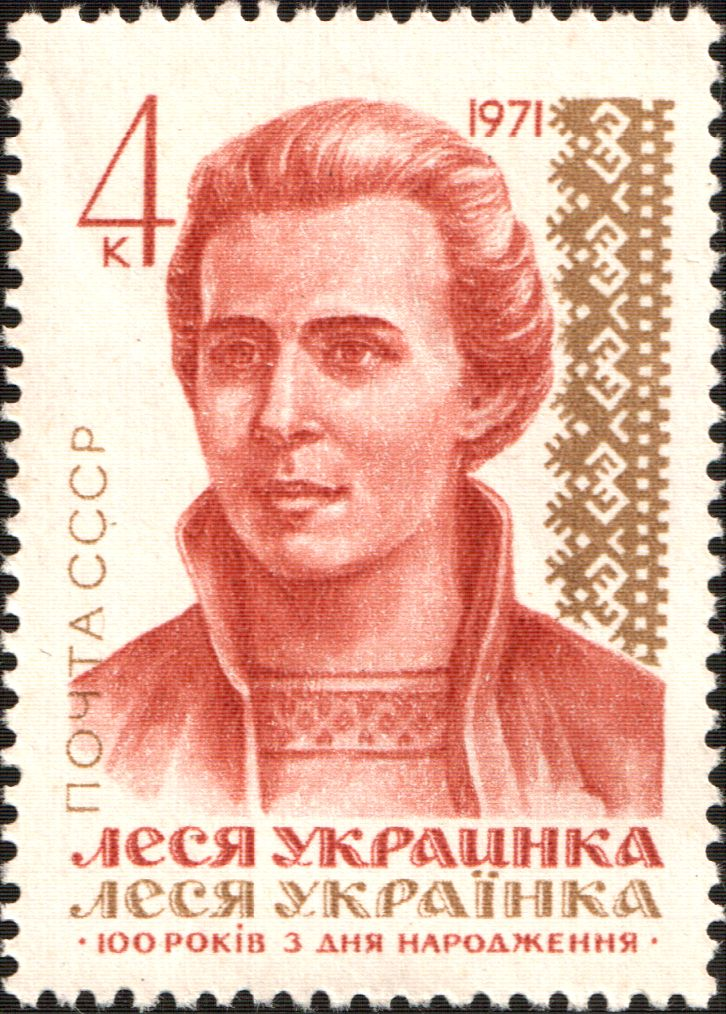
Soviet four-kopeck stamp commemorating the 100th anniversary of Lesya Ukrainka's birth

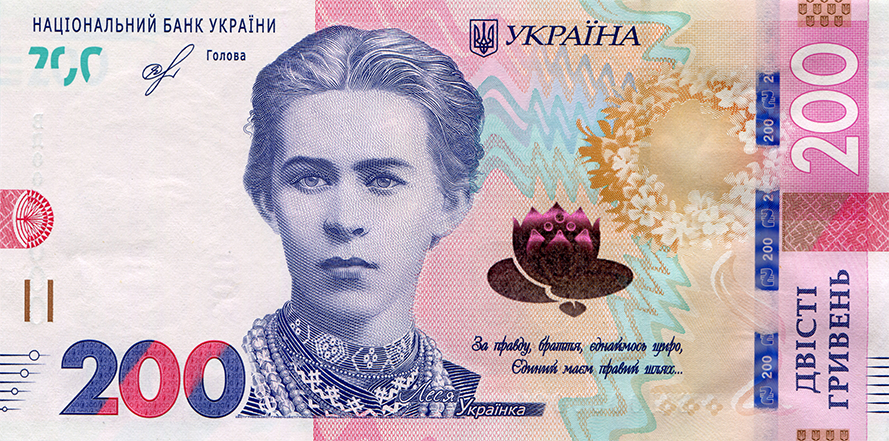
Portrait on obverse ₴200 bill 2019

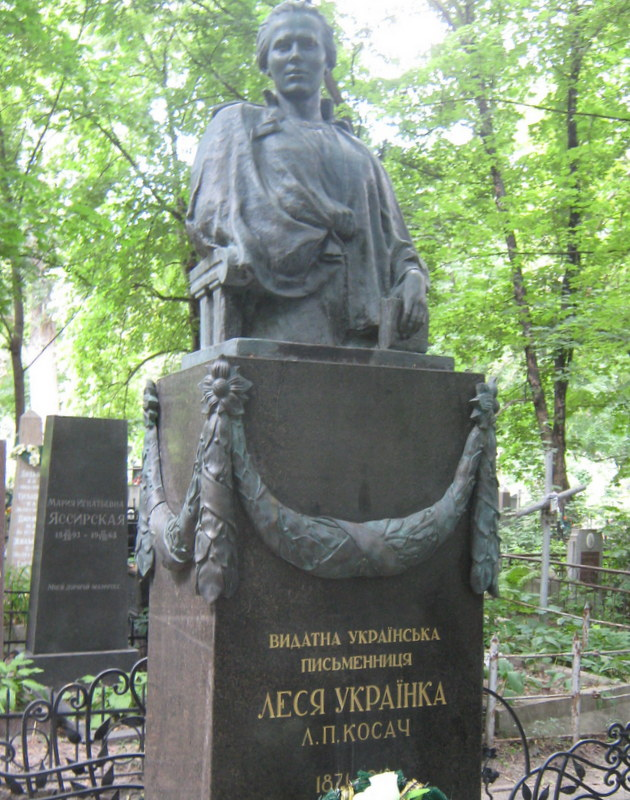
Lesya Ukrainka's burial location and monument at Baikove Cemetery in Kyiv

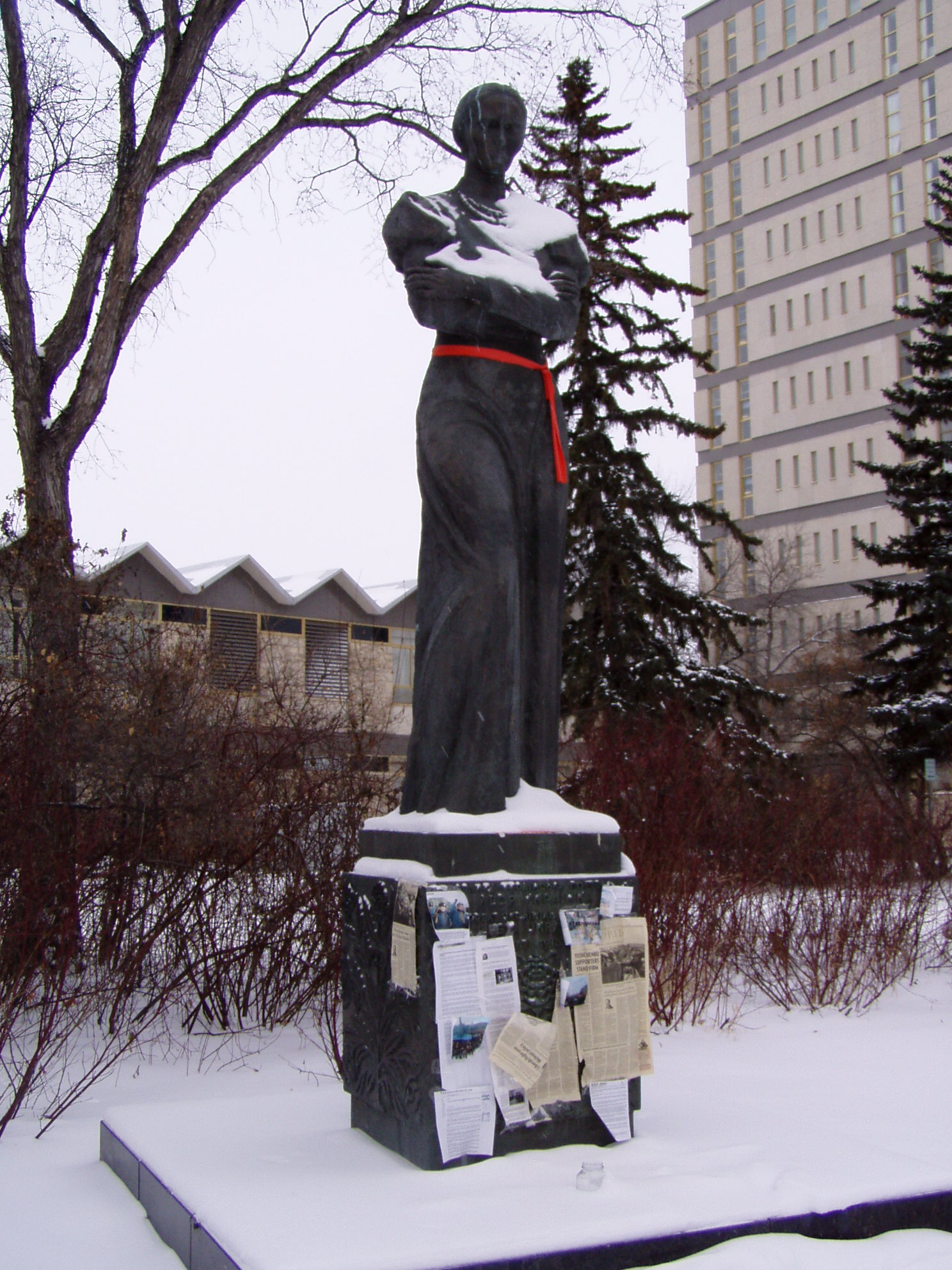
Lesya Ukrainka Statue, University of Saskatchewan

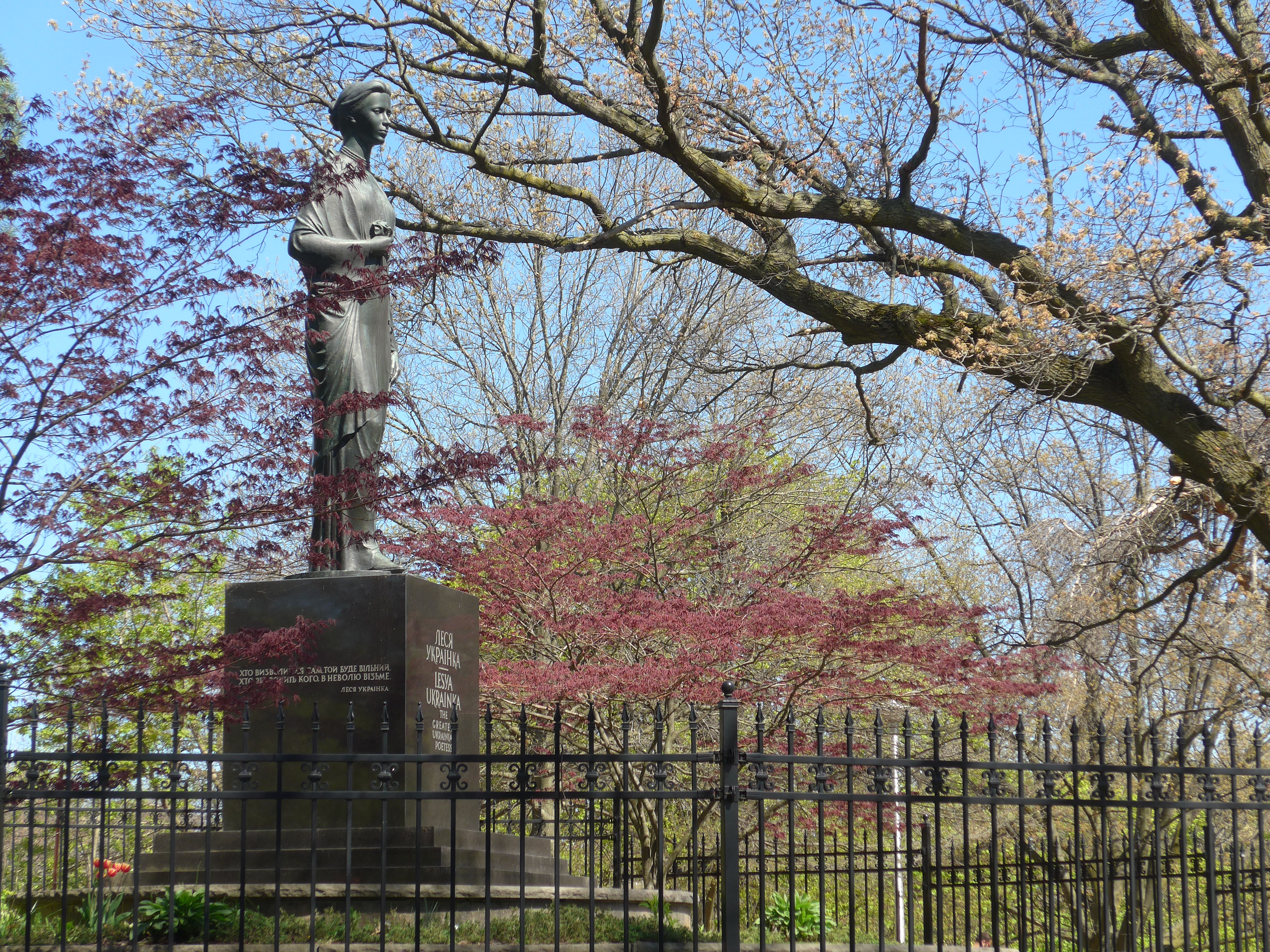
Statue of Lesya Ukrainka by Mykhailo Chereshniovsky erected in 1975 in High Park, in Toronto, Canada. Engraved is the quote "Whoever liberates themselves shall be free. Whoever is liberated by others captive shall remain".

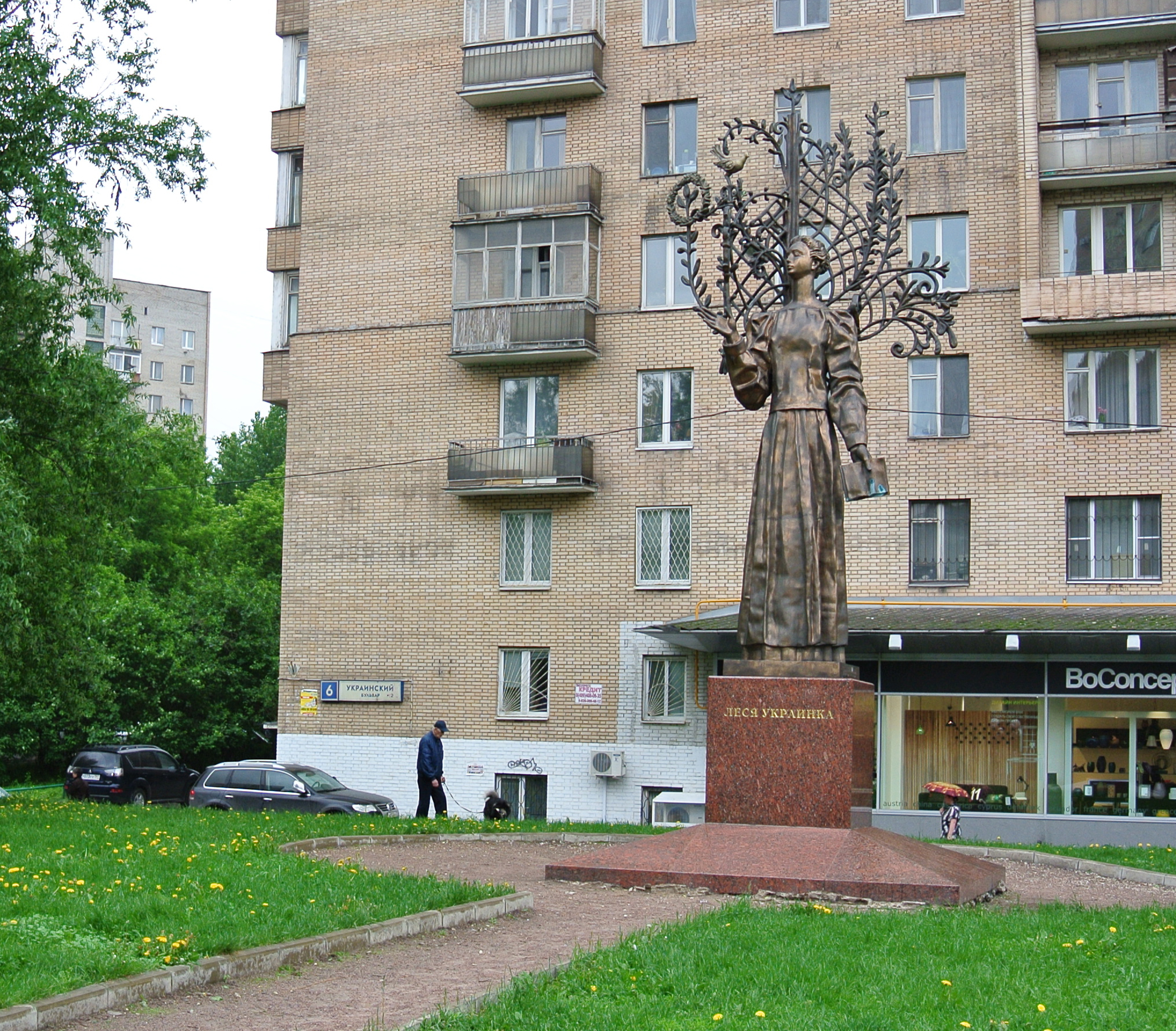
Statue of Lesya Ukrainka in Ukrainski bulvar, Moscow

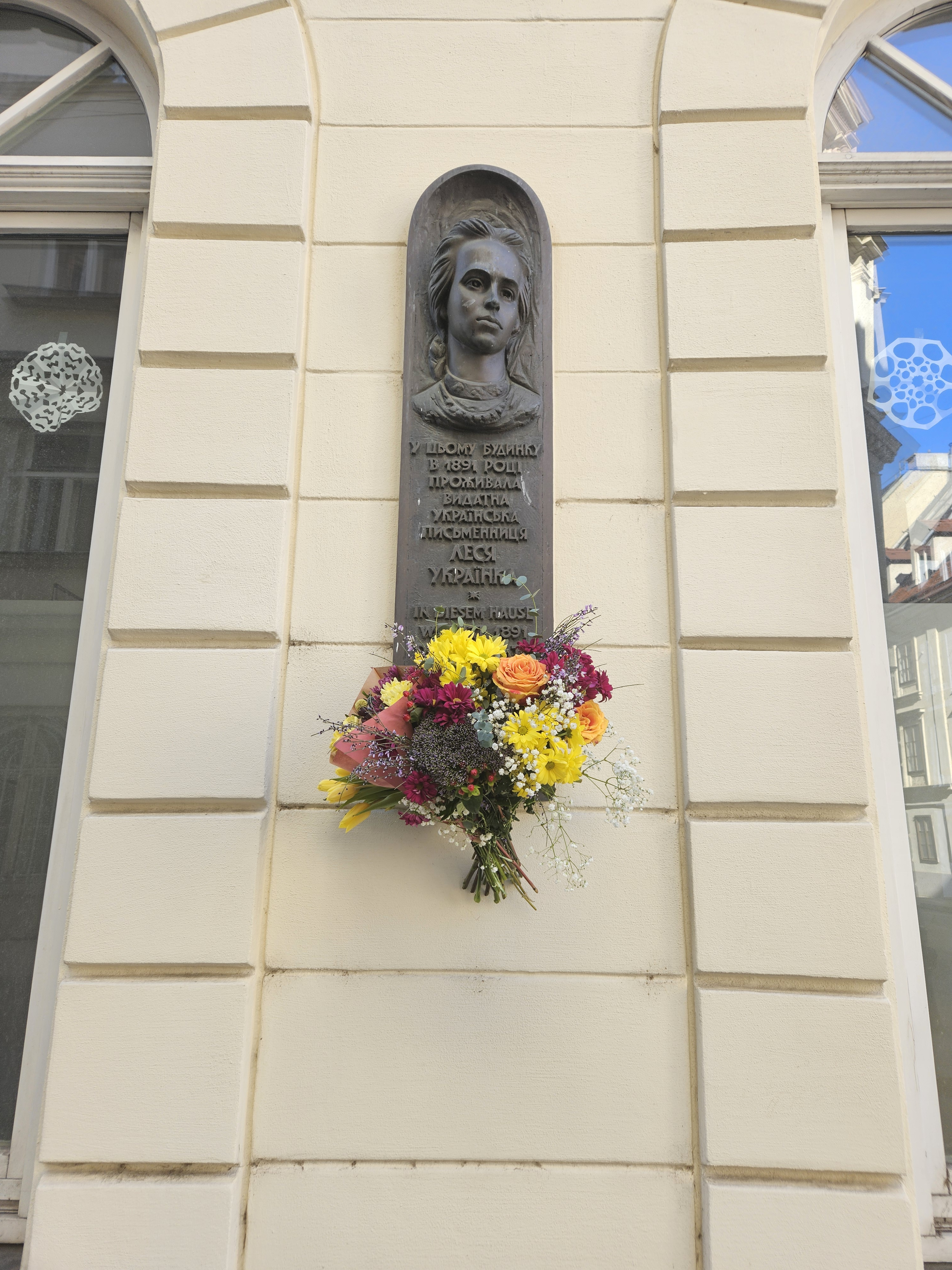
Memorial plaque to Lesya Ukrainka in Vienna, Austria is adorned by flowers for her birth anniversary, 25 March 2026

There are many monuments to Lesya Ukrainka in Ukraine and many other former Soviet Republics. Particularly in Kyiv, there is a main monument at the Lesya Ukrainka Boulevard that bears her name since 1961, and a smaller monument in the Mariinskyi Park (next to Mariinskyi Palace). There is also a bust in Qaradağ raion of Azerbaijan. One of the main Kyiv theaters, the Lesya Ukrainka National Academic Theater is colloquially referred to simply as Lesya Ukrainka Theater.

Under initiatives of local Ukrainian diasporas, there are several memorial societies and monuments to her throughout Canada and the United States, most notably a monument on the campus of the University of Saskatchewan in Saskatoon, Saskatchewan. There is also a bust of Ukrainka in Soyuzivka in New York State.

Each summer since 1975, Ukrainians in Toronto gather at the Lesya Ukrainka monument in High Park to celebrate her life and work.

A monument to Lesya Ukrainka stands in the Ukrainian Section of the Cleveland Cultural Gardens, erected under the auspices of the United Ukrainian Organizations and the Ukrainian community. The statue was designed by Mykhailo Chereshniovsky (1911- 94) and was commissioned by the Ukrainian National Women’s League of North America on the initiative of Mykhailyna Stawnycha, president of the UNWLA Branch 33 in Cleveland (and by the leadership of Kateryna Mural of Branch 30, who continuously headed the monument committee).The statue was unveiled on 2 September 1961 in the presence of the sister of Lesya Ukrainka, Isydora Kosach-Borysova.

Ukrainian composers Tamara Maliukova Sidorenko (1919–2005) and Yudif Grigorevna Rozhavskaya (1923–1982) set several of Ukrainka's poems to music.

The National Bank of Ukraine released a ₴200 banknote depicting Lesya Ukrainka in 2020.

According to the image consultant Oleh Pokalchuk, Ukrainka's hairstyle inspired the over-the-head braid of Yulia Tymoshenko.

According to Google Trends, Lesya Ukrainka was in 2020 the third in the ranking of Ukrainian women search queries in Google Search in Ukraine (the top two was Tina Karol and Olya Polyakova).

On 16 November 2022 Pushkin Avenue in Dnipro was renamed Lesya Ukrainka Avenue.

== English translations ==
- The Babylonian Captivity, (play), from Five Russian Plays, With One From the Ukrainian, Dutton, NY, 1916. from Archive.org;
- In the Catacombs (play) translated by David Turow;
- Short stories; “Christmas Eve”, “The Moth”, “Spring Songs”, “It is Late”, “The Only Son”, “The School”, “Happiness”, “A City of Sorrow”, “The Farewell”, “Sonorous Strings”, “A Letter to a Distant Shore”, “By the Sea”, “The Blind Man”, “The Apparition”, “The Mistake”, “A Moment”, “The Conversation” and “The Enemies” translated by Roma Franko;
- The Forest Song, (play), in "In a Different Light: A Bilingual Anthology of Ukrainian Literature Translated into English by Virlana Tkacz and Wanda Phipps as Performed by Yara Arts Group", compiled and edited by Olha Luchuk, Sribne Slovo Press, Lviv 2008.
- Cundy, Percival, trans. Spirit of Flame: A Collection of the Works of Lesya Ukrainka. Foreword by Clarence A. Manning. New York: Bookman Associates, 1950. Copyright 1950 by Ukrainian National Women’s League of America with dedication “ To the organized women of the United States who helped publish this book.”
- Lesya Ukrainka. Life and work by Constantine Bida. Selected works, translated by Vera Rich. Toronto: Published for the Women's Council of the Ukrainian Canadian Committee by University of Toronto Press, 1968. English translations: The Stone Host (pp. 87-142), The Orgy (pp. 143-180), Cassandra (pp. 181-239), Robert Bruce, King of Scotland (pp. 240-251), Seven Strings (pp. 252-255), Shorter Poems (pp. 256-259).
- Cassandra: A Dramatic Poem, Lesia Ukrainka, Nina Murray (Translator), Marko Pavlyshyn (Introduction by). Publisher: Harvard Ukrainian Research Institute, 2024, ISBN 9780674291775 (hardcover), 9780674291782 (paperback), 9780674291799 (epub), 9780674291805 (PDF).

== Adaptations ==
=== Theatrical adaptations of works ===
- 1994 Yara's Forest Song directed by Virlana Tkacz with Yara Arts Group at La MaMa Experimental Theatre in New York and Les Kurbas Theatre in Lviv
- 2013 Fire Water Night directed by Virlana Tkacz with Yara Arts Group at La MaMa Experimental Theatre in New York

=== Film adaptations of works ===
- "Forest Song" (1961), a film by Viktor Ivchenko
- "Fireplace Master" (1971), a film by Mstislav Dzhingzhiristy
- "Cassandra" (1974), film by Yuriy Nekrasov, Serhiy Smyan
- "Forest Song" (1976), cartoon by Alla Grachova
- "Forest Song. Mavka" (1981), a film by Yuriy Ilyenko
- "The Temptation of Don Juan" (1985), a film by Vasyl Levin and Grigory Koltunov
- "Blue Rose" (1988), a two-part film by Oleg Biima
- "Orgy" (1991), television play
- "On the field of blood. Aceldama" (2001), a film by Yaroslav Lupiy
- "Mavka: The Forest Song" (2022) a 3D cartoon by Oleksandra Ruban

== See also ==
- Lesya Ukrainka Theater
- The Forest Song
- List of Ukrainian-language poets
- List of Ukrainian women writers
- List of Ukrainian literature translated into English
