= Olena Pchilka =

Ukrainian writer, ethnographer, and activist (1849–1930)

Olha Kosach
- Ольга Косач
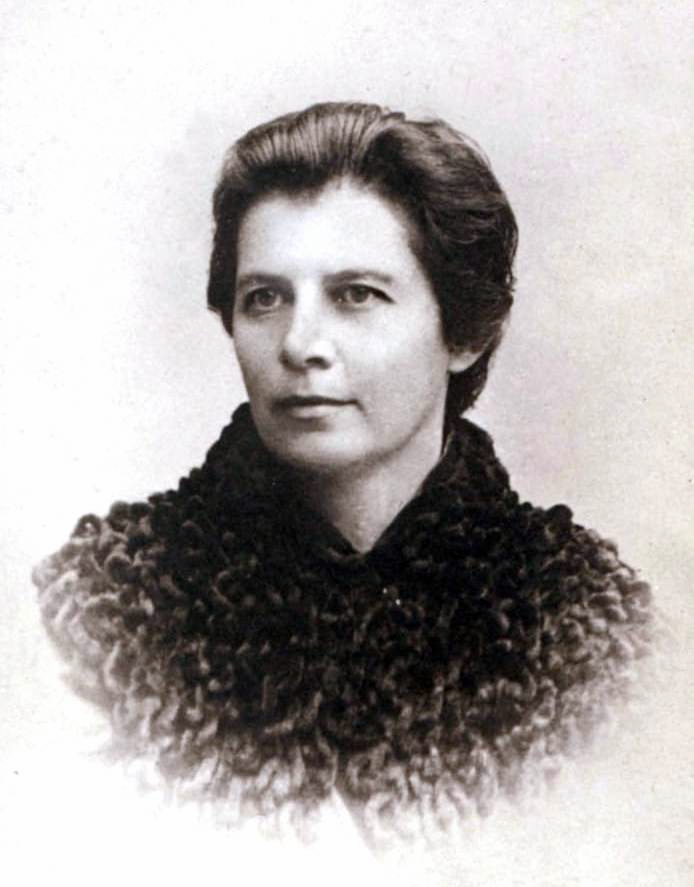
- Kosach in 1896
- Born: Olha Petrivna Drahomanova; 29 June 1849; Hadiach, Poltava Governorate, Russian Empire (now Ukraine)
- Died: 4 October 1930 (aged 81); Kyiv, Ukrainian SSR, Soviet Union (now Ukraine)
- Education: Exemplary Boarding School of Noble Maidens (Kyiv)
- Occupations: Writer; civil activist
- Spouse: Petro Kosach
- Children: 7, including Larysa, Olha, and Izydora
- Relatives: Mykhailo Drahomanov (brother)
- Writing career
- Pen name: Olena Pchilka
- Language: Ukrainian

Olha Petrivna Kosach (Note: Ukrainian: Ольга Петрівна Косач) (née Drahomanova; (Note: Ukrainian: Драгоманова) 29 June 1849 – 4 October 1930), better known by her pen name Olena Pchilka (Ukrainian: Олена Пчілка), was a Ukrainian publisher, writer, ethnographer, interpreter, and civil activist. She was the sister of Mykhailo Drahomanov and the mother of Lesya Ukrainka, Olha Kosach-Kryvyniuk, Mykhailo Kosach, Oksana Kosach-Shymanovska, Mykola Kosach, Izydora Kosach-Borysova and Yuriy Kosach.

== Biography ==
Pchilka was born in Hadiach, into the family of a local landowner, Petro Drahomanov. The family originated from a Greek dragoman who served in the chancellery of Hetman Bohdan Khmelnytsky. It had a long tradition of opposition activities: one of her uncles was exiled to Siberia due to his participation in the Decembrist movement, her father was fired from state service for his help to poor descendants of Cossack starshyna, and her brother Mykhailo had to emigrate after co-authoring a work of satire directed against the director of his gymnasium.

Pchilka received a basic education at home and completed her studies at the Exemplary Boarding School of Noble Maidens (Kyiv) in 1866. During her time at the school Pchilka published her first story, which was written in German language. She married Petro Kosach sometime in 1868 and soon moved to Novohrad-Volynskyi, where he worked. Her daughter Lesya Ukrainka was born there.

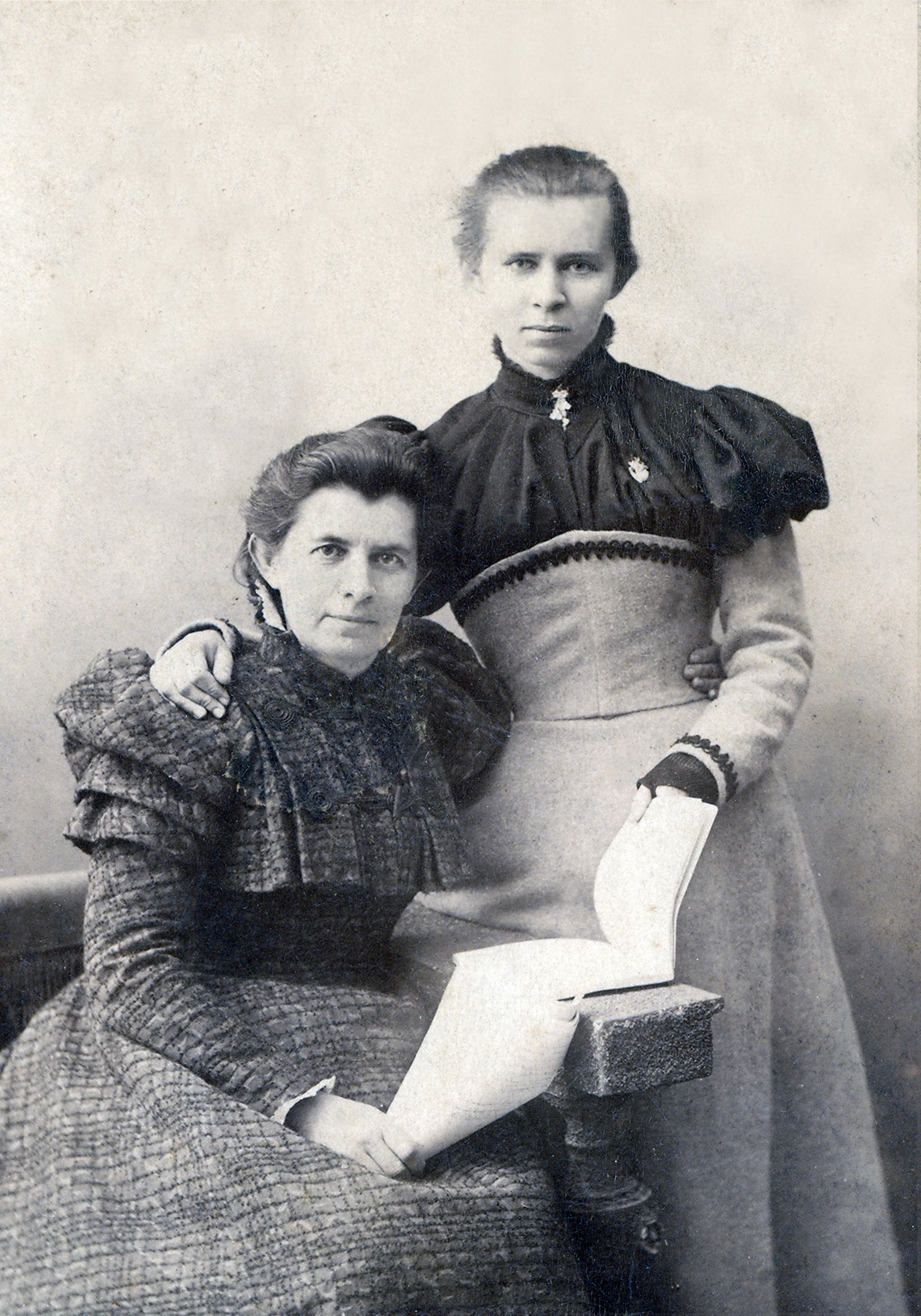
Olena Pchilka with Lesya Ukrainka, 1898

Encouraged by the lack of Ukrainian reading material for her children, Pchilka began her career by translating children's stroies, as well as poetry by Pushkin and Lermontov, into Ukrainian. She also recorded folk songs, folk customs, and rites, and collected traditional embroidery in Volhynia, later publishing her research in the book Ukrainian Folk Ornament in Kyiv in 1876. As a result, she became known as the first expert in this type of folk art in Ukraine. In 1880, Pchilka published Stepan Rudansky's Songs at her own expense, and a year later a collection of her Ukrainian translations from the works of Gogol, Pushkin and Lermontov, To Ukrainian Children (1881), was published. Pchilka also translated works of Adam Mickiewicz. In 1883, she began publishing poems and stories in the Lviv magazine Zorya, her first being the collection of poems Thoughts of a Net (1886). At the same time, she took an active part in the Ukrainian women's movement; in 1887, together with Natalia Kobrynska, she published the almanac "The First Wreath" in Lviv. Her story Tovaryshky, published in the same year, was criticized by her brother Mykhailo Drahomanov as unrealistic due to its depiction of two Ukrainian maidens studying at a university. However, soon thereafter the feat of its heroines was repeated in real life by Kobrynska and her friend Sofia Okunevska, who started their studies at the University of Zurich.

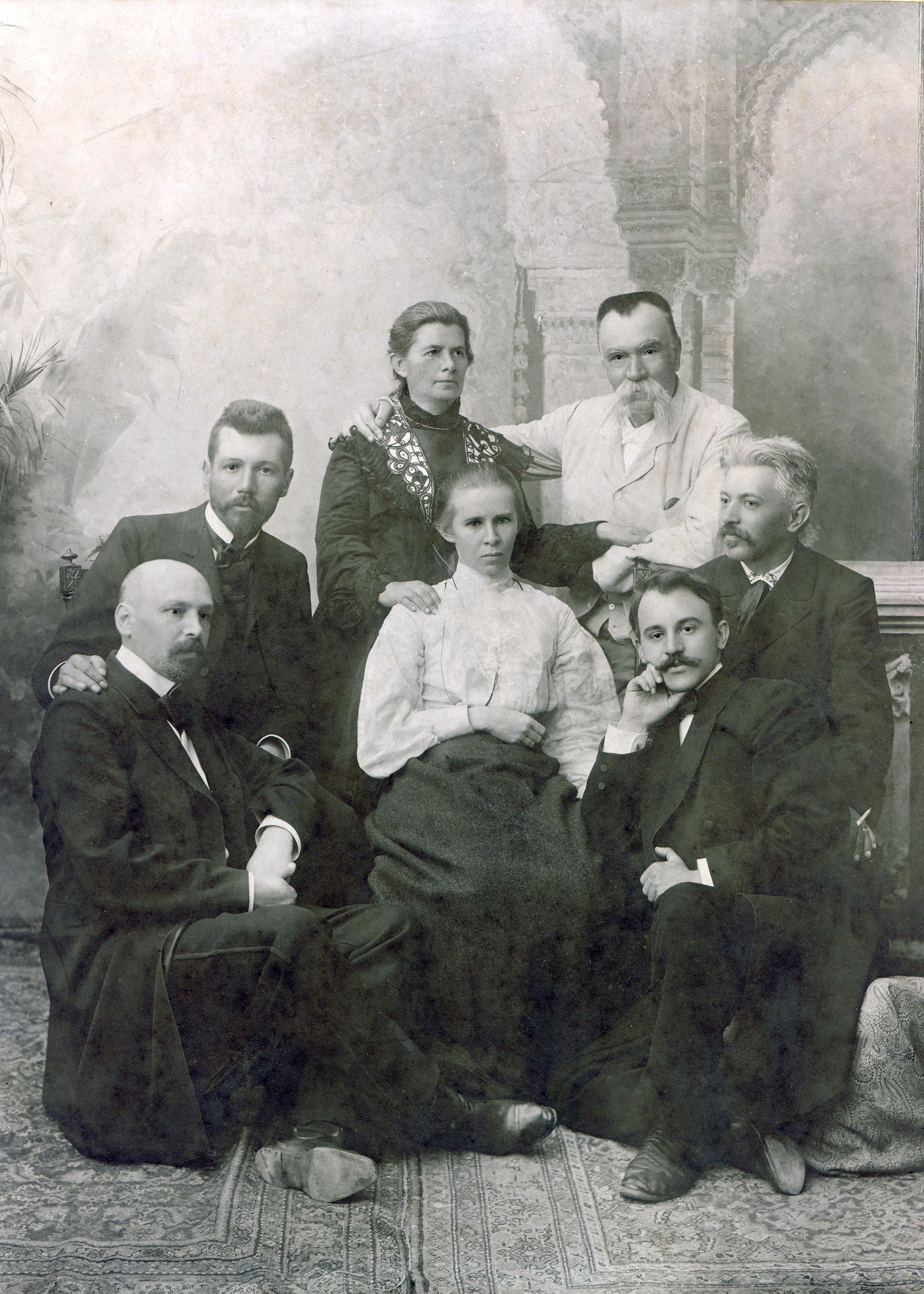
A group of Ukrainian writers gathered in Poltava to inaugurate a monument to Ivan Kotliarevsky, 1903. From left: Mykhailo Kotsiubynsky, Vasyl Stefanyk, Olena Pchilka, Lesya Ukrainka, Mykhailo Starytsky, Hnat Khotkevych, Volodymyr Samijlenko.

According to Pchilka herself, all of her texts were based on real events and experience from her life in Zviahel, Lutsk and Kovel. She created many Christmas and New Year stories, which were especially popular among publishers. Together with Mykhailo Starytsky Pchilka introduced many neologisms into the Ukrainian language, which led to critic from her opponents. During her stay in Lutsk she initiated the purchase of Ukrainian books for local libraries, and in 1890s became a member of a literary-artistic society in Kyiv, which also involved Mykhailo Starytsky and Mykola Lysenko. During one of her trips to Galicia Pchilka got acquainted with Volodymyr Shukhevych. During the opening of the monument to Ivan Kotliarevsky in Poltava she gave her speech in the Ukrainian language, despite the ban by authorities. In the late 1900s, Pchilka started her career as dramatist, and after 1918 she created a number of children's plays at the request of Sofia Rusova. In 1906, Pchilka became the editor of the newspaper Ridnyi Krai ("Native Land"), which was published in Poltava until the introduction of a ban on Ukrainian press in 1914. In 1908, she also started publishing a children's monthly called Moloda Ukraina ("Young Ukraine").

After the death of her husband Petro and children Mykhalo and Lesia, Pchilka moved back to Hadiach. A long-term object of surveillance by the Russian police, she was reportedly critical of the Bolsheviks after their capture of power over Ukraine. In 1920, she was arrested after being accused of counter-revolutionary activities including the public demonstration of the blue-and-yellow flag, but was freed after the intervention of one of her acquaintances, who was a Borotbist. In 1929, Pchilka's son-in-law was sentenced as part of the Union for the Freedom of Ukraine trial, but she was already too ill to take part in the process herself. Recognized as one of the most well-known Ukrainian female poets, Olena Pchilka died in Kyiv, aged 81.

== Works ==
Among the most prominent of her works are the following:

- "Tovaryshky" (Comradesses, 1887),
- "Svitlo dobra i lyubovi" (The light of goodness and love, 1888),
- "Soloviovyi spiv" (Nightingale singing, 1889),
- "Za pravdoyu" (For a truth, 1889),
- "Artyshok" (Artichoke, 1907),
- "Pivtora oseledsya" (One and a half herring, 1908),
- a play "Suzhena ne ohuzhena" (1881),
- a play "Svitova rich" (World thing, 1908) and others.
