= Olha Kosach-Kryvyniuk =

Ukrainian journalist (1877–1945)

- Ольга Косач-Кривинюк
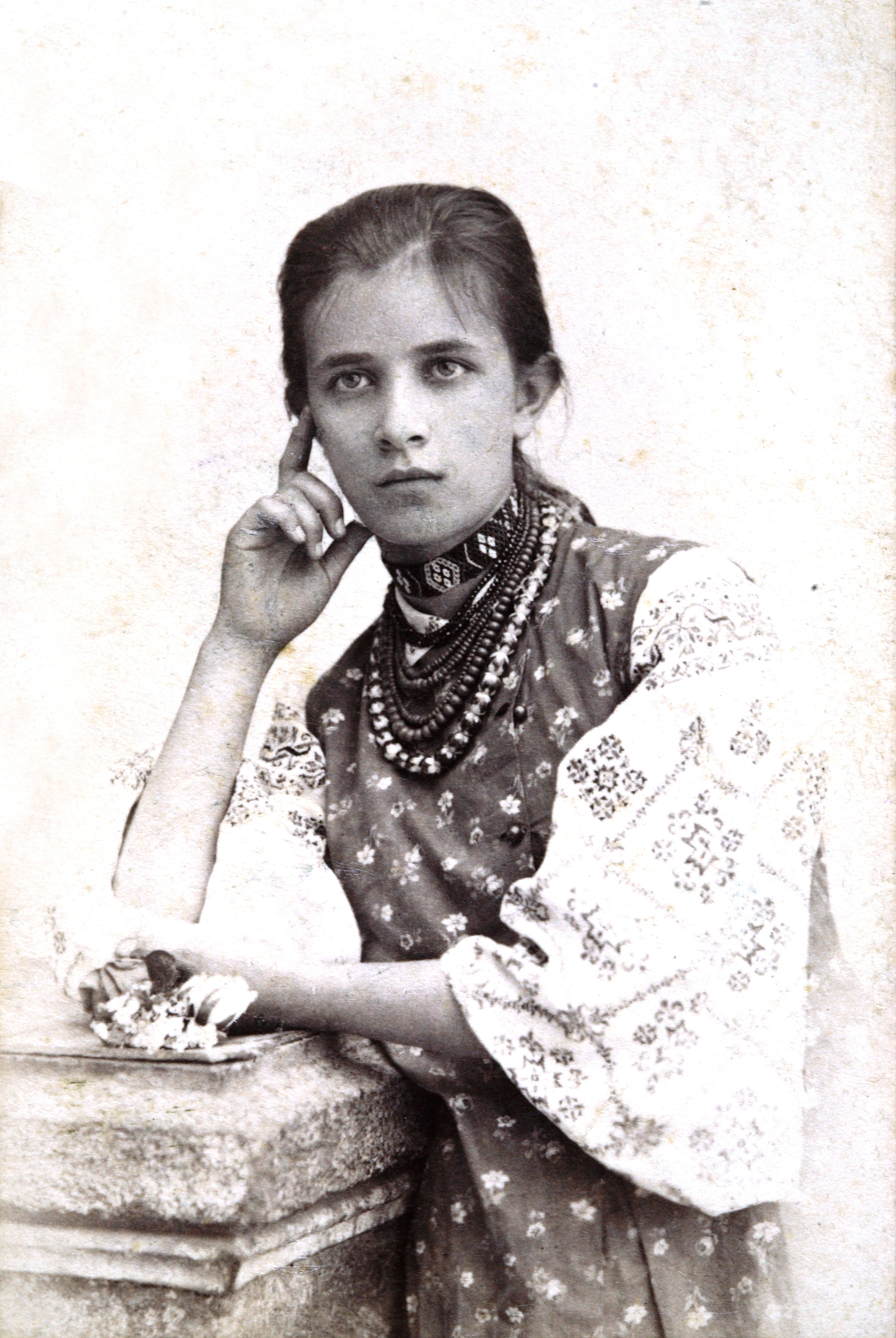
- Olha Kosach in 1896.
- Born: May 26, 1877; Novohrad-Volynskyi, Russian Empire; now Zviahel, Ukraine
- Died: November 11, 1945 (aged 68); Augsburg, Allied-occupied Germany
- Other name: Olena Zirka
- Occupations: Writer, translator, physician

Olha Petrivna Kosach-Kryvyniuk (Ukrainian: Ольга Косач-Кривинюк; May 26, 1877 – November 11, 1945) was a Ukrainian writer, translator, and physician.

A member of the Prosvita cultural movement, she worked to establish a Ukrainian literary tradition through completing Ukrainian-language translations of Russian, French, and English literature under the pseudonym Olena Zirka. Her efforts to document the life and work of her sister, the poet Lesya Ukrainka, culminated in an extensive chronology that was published posthumously in 1970.

== Early life ==
Olha Kosach was born in 1877 in the city of Novohrad-Volynskyi (at the time situated in the Russian Empire; now Zviahel, Ukraine). Her parents were Petro Kosach and the writer and activist Olena Pchilka, and her siblings Lesya Ukrainka and Mykhailo Kosach also became prominent writers and public figures.

Kosach attended a girls' school in Kyiv, graduating in 1897. She also taught Sunday school while living there.

== Studies in Saint Petersburg ==
She traveled to Saint Petersburg to train as a physician, studying at the Saint Petersburg Women's Medical Institute, now the First Pavlov State Medical University of St. Petersburg, from 1899 to 1903.

While living there, she began working as a translator, translating the work of Ukrainian novelists into Russian for the magazine Life. She also became involved in the Ukrainian student hromada in Saint Petersburg. She was imprisoned for her involvement in the secret society.

In addition to her nationalist leanings, Kosach was a feminist who advocated for women's empowerment. After graduating from the medical institute in 1904, she married Mykhailo Kryvyniuk, but her parents struggled to accept her rejection of a church marriage, which she viewed as demeaning to women, in favor of a civil partnership.

== Life in Kyiv and Lotsmanska Kamianka ==
Kosach-Kryvyniuk moved with her new husband to Prague, where they had a child in 1906. Shortly thereafter, she moved with her son to Kyiv, while her husband stayed in Prague. They later reunited, but he was arrested in 1931, imprisoned and tortured in the Lukyanivska Prison, and later died in exile.

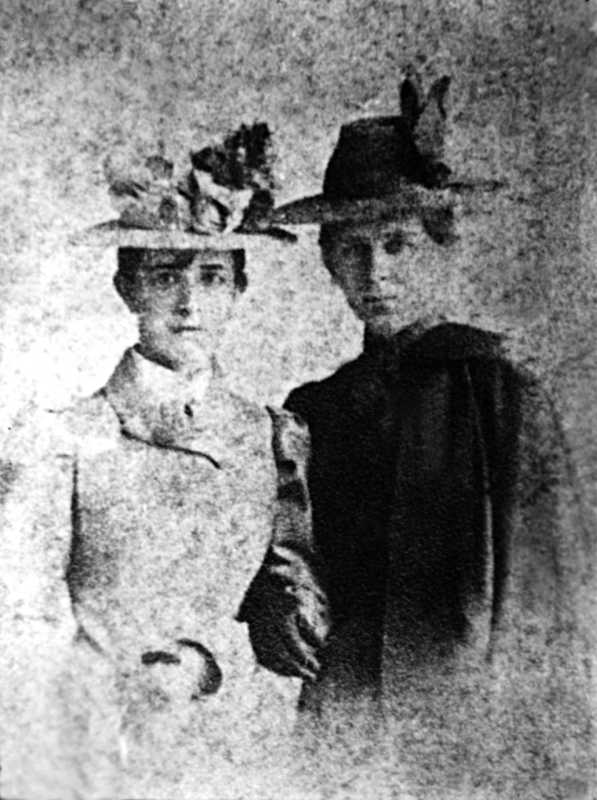
Olha Kosach (left) and her sister Lesya Ukrainka in Berlin in 1899.

While living in Kyiv, Kosach-Kryvyniuk was active in the Prosvita Ukrainian cultural movement. Then, from 1910 to 1922 she worked as a zemstvo physician, providing free rural health care and public health guidance, in Lotsmanska Kamianka, a town near what is now Dnipro. While living there, she ran an orphanage and taught Ukrainian. She also was involved in literary production, publishing several works by her sister Lesya Ukrainka and translating works by such authors as Victor Hugo, George Sand, Rudyard Kipling, and Charles Dickens into Ukrainian, working under the pseudonym Olena Zirka. Her work aimed to shape Ukraine's literary tradition and thus its national identity, particularly during the Ukrainian War of Independence.

She was also very interested in Ukrainian folk arts, particularly embroidery, which had also been an interest of her mother's. She based her 1928 book Ukraïns'ki narodni vzory z Kyïvshchyny, Poltavshchyny, i Katerynoslavshchyny ("Ukrainian Folk [Embroidery] Patterns from the Kyiv, Poltava, and Katerynoslav Region") on her own embroidery collection.

While living in Lotsmanska Kamianka, she had another son, in 1920. The family returned to Kyiv in 1924, and she worked there as a Ukrainian teacher and a librarian at a medical library.

Throughout her life, Kosach-Kryvyniuk's work was published in such magazines as Zorya, Dzvinok, and Moloda Ukrayina. Her writing included memoirs about her family. In her later years in particular, she devoted herself to compiling and studying an archive of materials on her sister Lesya, who died in 1913. The resulting work, Lesya Ukraïnka: Khronolohiia zhyttia i tvorchosty ("Lesya Ukrainka: A Chronology of Her Life and Work"), was published posthumously in 1970.

== Exile and death ==
During World War II, Kosach-Kryvyniuk fled in 1944 to Prague, stopping in Lviv to deposit the family archive with the literary critic Maria Derkach for safekeeping. She ended up in a displaced persons camp in Augsburg, in the American zone of Allied-occupied Germany, where she died in 1945.
