= Virlana Tkacz =

American theatre director (born 1952)

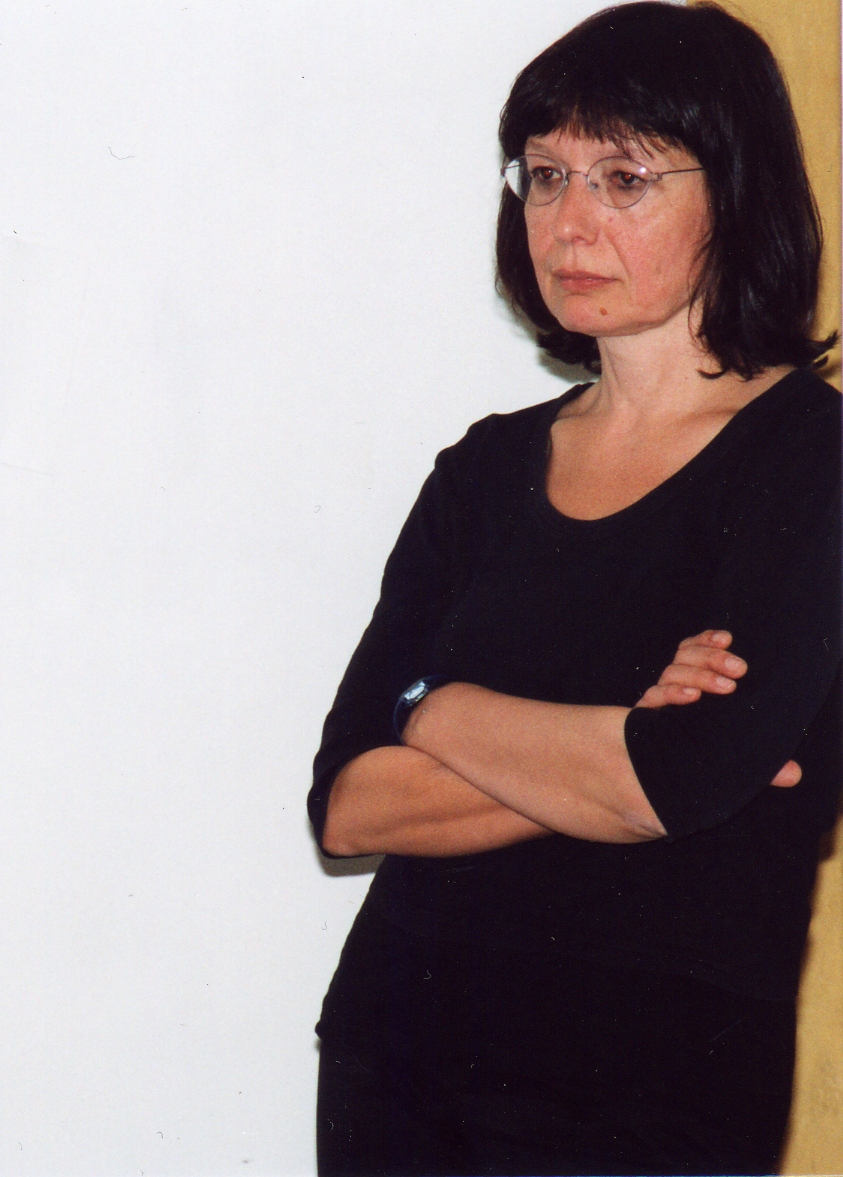
- Born: June 23, 1952 (age 74); Newark, New Jersey, U.S.
- Education: Bennington College and Columbia University
- Occupation: Theatre director

Virlana Tkacz (born June 23, 1952) is an American theatre director who is the founding director of the Yara Arts Group, a resident company at the world-renowned La MaMa Experimental Theatre Club in New York. She was educated at Bennington College and Columbia University, where she earned a Master of Fine Arts in theatre directing.

With Yara, Tkacz has created over forty original theatre pieces drawing on fragments of contemporary poetry, traditional songs, chants, legends, and history from the East, combining these elements into narrative, image-driven productions. The works incorporate video, projected images, and complex musical scores to examine themes of time and consciousness.

== Theatre productions ==
Yara's recent pieces include 1917-2017: Tychyna, Zhadan & the Dogs, about the violence of war, which received two New York Innovative Theatre Awards; Tkacz directed Yara's Radio 477! about Kharkiv, Ukraine, based on a jazz score from Kharkiv in 1929, the musical-cabaret Slap! about Futurist painter David Burliuk, and The Magic of Light, a theater piece with puppets, described as "exquisite"; "The content of this production is sobering and unflinching. But the puppets who serve as the messengers of that content are spellbinding vessels of delight."

Other recent Yara theatre projects include Yara's 2023 collaboration with Ping Chong to create Undesirable Elements: Ukraine and the 2024 show about Mariupol.

Tkacz has created over thirty original theatre pieces that were collaborations with experimental theatre companies from Ukraine. These pieces were performed at La MaMa in New York, in major theatres in Kyiv, Kharkiv and Lviv and at international theatre festivals, as well as in village cultural centers. Yara's piece Dark Night, Bright Stars, was about the meeting of Ukrainian poet Taras Shevchenko and African America tragedian Ira Aldridge, which NY Theatre Wire called "visually striking," writing: "On the surface level, this play is a story about two friends with similar pasts having a cultural exchange, but dig deeper and you discover themes of race and poverty, oppression and liberation, diaspora and the yearning for home." Opera GAZ she created with Nova Opera from Kyiv performed at La MaMa in New York in December 2019 and was called "brilliant," "one of the most searing modern operas" and "a must see."

During the pandemic lockdown in 2020, Virlana Tkacz created Virtual Forest Song, revisioning fragments of Lesia Ukrainka's classic 1911 verse play, which she translated with Wanda Phipps, and setting them in the future after some ecological catastrophe. The show was created, rehearsed and performed live on zoom, Yara's Virtual Forest Song. Technology was used to play with images of trees (oak, sycamore, birch and willow) merging with actors, music, and newsreel images of 'burnt and ruined' homes from the conflict zones in Eastern Ukraine.

From 2005 Yara worked with the Koliadnyky (or winter songs singers) from Kryvorivnia, a village in the Carpathian Mountains of Ukraine. With the Koliadnyky Virlana Tkacz created the shows Koliada: Twelve Dishes (2005), Still the River Flows (2008), Winter Sun (2010), Midwinter Night (2013), Winter Light (2014) and Winter Songs on Mars (2019) at La MaMa, as well as over one hundred concerts of traditional music in the US and Canada from the Carpathians performed on local folk instruments. Virlana first recorded the Hutsul Koliada in Kryvorivnia in 2003. The Koliada is a winter ritual that is now a part of Christmas, but its traditions hark back to local winter solstice celebrations. The first Yara's winter shows were based on these local winter rituals and the long winter songs the Koliadnyky sing to each person in a home they visit. Virlana translated a selection of these songs with Wanda Phipps to use in the Yara shows. Eventually, Virlana incorporated part of a traditional Nativity puppet play as a second part of the show. For a final section, she invited diverse Yara artists to perform their own winter songs to celebrate the Koliada in the East Village of New York.

In 2005 Tkacz worked on a translation of Janyl Myrza, a 17th-century Kyrgyz epic about a woman warrior. After traveling to the Celestial Mountains, she created Janyl, with artists from Yara and the Sakhna Nomadic Theatre of Kyrgyzstan. The show performed at La MaMa in 2007, the capital of Bishkek, the regional center of Naryn and in the Celestial Mountains, where Janyl's story took place. Photographs from Janyl are featured in Kyrgyz Epic Theatre in New York: Photographs by Margaret Morton published by the University of Central Asia in 2008. In 2008 Virlana created Er Toshtuk based on one of the oldest Kyrgyz epics about a magical and darkly humorous journey into the underworld. The show performed at La MaMa in 2009 and continued to perform in Kyrgyzstan for several years after that. Backstage called it "a small gem," "full of humor and terrific physicality."

Yara created a series of shows based on the poetry of Oleh Lysheha, including Swan (2003), Raven (2011), Dream Bridge (2012), as well as three shows with Nina Matvienko.

From 1996 to 2004 Virlana worked with indigenous Buryat artists from Siberia. Together they created six original theatre pieces. Based on traditional material, rituals and shaman chants these pieces were performed at La MaMa, in Ulan Ude at the Buryat National Theatre, and in the villages of Aga-Buryat Region. Yara's Buryat shows include Circle, which entered the repertoire of the Buryat National Theatre and after its 330 performance became the National Theatre's most performed show. The Village Voice wrote: "A stunningly beautiful work, Circle, rushes at your senses, makes your heart pound, and shakes your feeling loose."

In addition to her work with Yara, Tkacz directed Return of the Native for BAM's Next Wave Festival with composer Peter Gordon and video artist Kit Fitzgerald. The piece performed at the Tucano Arts Festival in Rio de Janeiro and at Het Muziektheatre in Amsterdam. She also worked with them on Blue Lights in the Basement, the memorial to Marvin Gaye at the BAM Opera House. At the Aaron Davis Hall she staged Sekou Sundiata's Mystery of Love, ETC. She worked with David Roussève on Mana Goes to the Moon, and also directed plays for the Native American Ensemble, The Women's Project and in Coney Island.

Tkacz was a Fulbright Senior Scholar at the Theatre Institutes in Kyiv in 2002 and in Bishkek in 2008, as well as at the Kurbas Theatre Center in Kyiv (2016). She has conducted theatre workshops for Harvard Summer Institute for eleven years and has lectured at Yale School of Drama and Tisch School of the Arts at NYU. She has assisted such directors as Andrei Serban, Ping Chong, George Ferencz and Wilford Leach at La MaMa, as well as Sir Peter Hall on Broadway and Michael Bogdanov at the National Theatre in London.

== Books and translations ==
Since 1989 Virlana Tkacz has worked with African-American poet Wanda Phipps on translations of Ukrainian poetry. Their work has formed the core of many Yara theatre pieces and appeared in numerous American literary journals, anthologies and on CD inserts. Their translations of Ukrainian poems used in Yara productions were published in 2008 as a bilingual anthology In a Different Light. Together they have received the Agni Translation Prize, numerous NYSCA translation grants and The National Theatre Translation Fund Award for their work on the verse drama Forest Song.

In 2005 Tkacz was awarded the NEA Poetry Translation Fellowship for work on the contemporary poetry of Serhiy Zhadan. In 2019 Yale University Press published What We Life For/What We Die For: Selected Poems by Serhiy Zhadan in their translations. The reviewer for Times Literary Supplement called Zhadan "a world-class poet" and their translations "masterful". In 2023 Yale University Press published a second volume of Tkacz and Phipps's translations of Serhiy Zhadan's poetry How Fire Descends, which was a finalist for the 2024 PEN America Poetry in Translation Award.

Tkacz and Phipps have also devoted themselves to translating traditional material including: folk tales, songs, incantations and epics. In 2014 Yara Arts Group published Still The River Flows: Winter Solstice and Christmas Ritual in a Carpathian Village, a bilingual book with translations by Virlana Tkacz and Wanda Phipps and photography by Alexander Khantaev. Maria Sonevytsky, professor of Anthropology and Ethnomusicology at Bard College reviewed the book, saying, "As a book of art featuring Khantaev’s sumptuous visuals and the crystalline verse of these songs, this is an object to covet."

Yara's work with Buryat artists led Tkacz and Phipps to collaborate with Sayan Zhambalov on Buryat Mongolian translations. Their work on shaman chants was recognized by the Witter Bynner Foundation for Poetry Translation Award and led to the publication of their book Shanar: Dedication Ritual of a Buryat Shaman by Parabola Books in 2002. The book was published in paperback as Siberian Shamanism: The Shanar Ritual of the Buryats in 2015 and in French as Chamanisme Siberien: Le Rituel du Shanar des Bouriates in 2017.

In 2022 a book of Tkacz's own poetry "Three Wooden Trunks" was published by Lost Horse Press.

Tkacz has published scholarly articles on the works of Ukrainian avant-garde theater director Les Kurbas in Theatre History Studies, Journal of Ukrainian Studies, Canadian Slavonic Papers, and Canadian-American Slavic Studies and has written about her own work in American Theatre. In 2010 she co-edited with Irena Makaryk Modernism in Kyiv: Jubilant Experimentation, a monumental book on the arts of Kyiv in the 1920s published by University of Toronto Press in 2010. Uilliam Blacker reviewed the book for Harvard Ukrainian Studies and wrote: "Irena Makaryk and Virlana Tkacz's volume on the dynamic cultural life of Kyiv in the age of modernism represents a momentous achievement in English-language scholarship on Ukrainian culture. The volume recovers the neglected but rich modernist culture of Ukraine for the English-speaking reader, but its significance is, by virtue of the scope and framing of the project, also wider than this: in its attention to transnational cultural dynamics and (neo)colonial frameworks and attitudes, the volume represents a corrective to the metropolitan orientation of scholarship on modernist culture."

== Exhibitions ==
In 2017 and 2018 together with Tetiana Rudenko and Waldemart Klyuzko, Virlana Tkacz co-curated a series of museum exhibitions on the work of theatre director Les Kurbas. These included: Kurbas in Kyiv, February–October 2017 at the Museum of Theatre, Music and Cinema in Kyiv, Kurbas in Kharkiv at the Yermilov Center in Kharkiv and Kurbas: New Worlds at the Mystetsky Arsenal in Kyiv. The catalog for this exhibit is now available on-line

From 2020 to 2023 Yara collaborated with Bliss on Bliss and the Poets of Queens to present the exhibition Threads, featuring textile artworks inspired by poetry. Threads was shown in New York, Bogota, the Drawing Center at Manila and at the Ukrainian Institute of Modern Art in Chicago, IL.

In November 2022 Yara presented Mariupol an exhibit of the award-winning photographs and video of Evgeniy Maloletka and Mstyslav Chernov at Howl Arts Gallery in New York. In the spring of 2024 the exhibit was at the Howl Happening and surrounded Yara's show about Mariupol. It was also presented at Toronto City Hall.

== Honors ==
In 2007 Virlana Tkacz was named "Honored Artist of Ukraine."
In 2009 Virlana Tkacz received the Princess Olha Medal 3rd degree.
In 2023 Yara Arts Group, which Virlana Tkacz heads, received the 2023 Village Preservation Award.

== Productions Virlana Tkacz created with Yara Arts Group ==
2025 The Magic of Light
2019-2025 Slap!
2024 Mariupol
2023 Undesirable Elements: Ukraine with Ping Chong & Company
2021-2023 Radio 477!
2021 A Thousand Suns
2021 Virtual Forest Song
2019 Opera GAZ
2019 Winter Songs on Mars
2018 Following the Milky Way
2017 1917/2017: Tychyna, Zhandan and the Dogs
2014-2016 Dark Night, Bright Stars
2015 Hitting Bedrock
2014 Winter Light
2014 Underground Dreams
2014 Capt. John Smith Goes to Ukraine
2013 Fire, Water, Night
2013 Midwinter Night
2012 Dream Bridge
2011 Raven
2010 Winter Sun
2010 Scythian Stones
2009 Er Toshtuk
2008 Still the River Flows
2007 Janyl
2005 Koliada: Twelve Dishes
2004 The Warrior's Sister
2003 Swan
2002 Howling
2002 Kupala
2001 Obo: Our Shamanism
2000 Song Tree
2000 Circle
1998-99 Flight of the White Bird
1996-1997 Virtual Souls
1995 Waterfall/Reflections
1994 Yara's Forest Song
1993 Blind Sight
1992 Explosions
1990-91 A Light from the East/In the Light

For more information on Yara Arts Group and photographs see Yara Arts Group

== Books ==
- How Fire Descends, poetry by Serhiy Zhadan, translated by V. Tkacz and W. Phipps, 2nd ed. Yale University Press, 2023.
- Three Wooden Trunks, poetry by Virlana Tkacz, Sandpoint, Idaho: Lost Horse Press, 2022.
- Dream Bridge: Selected Poems, by Oleh Lysheha, translated by Virlana Tkacz and Wanda Phipps, Liberty Lake, Washington: Lost Horse Press, 2022.
- "Kurbas: New Worlds", catalog of exhibit at Mysteskyi Arsenal in Kyiv, Ukraine from October 17 to December 2, 2018.
- What We Live For/What We Die For: Selected Poems, by Serhiy Zhadan, translated by Virlana Tkacz and Wanda Phipps, New Haven: Yale University Press, 2019.
- Still The River Flows: Winter Solstice and Christmas Rituals in a Carpathian Village, by Virlana Tkacz with translations by Virlana Tkacz and Wanda Phipps; photography by Alexander Khantaev. Published by Yara Arts Group, 2014.
- Modernism in Kyiv: Jubilant Experimentation, edited by Irena R. Makaryk and Virlana Tkacz, Toronto: University of Toronto Press, 2010.
- In a Different Light: A Bilingual Anthology of Ukrainian Literature Translated into English by Virlana Tkacz and Wanda Phipps as Performed by Yara Arts Group, edited by Olha Luchuk, Lviv: Sribne Slovo Press, 2008
- Kyrgyz Epic Theatre in New York: Photographs by Margaret Morton edited by Virlana Tkacz, Bishkek: University of Central Asia, 2008.
- Shanar: Dedication Ritual of a Buryat Shaman by Virlana Tkacz, with Sayan Zhambalov and Wanda Phipps, photographs by Alexander Khantaev, New York: Parabola Books, 2002.
- Ten Years of Poetry from the Yara Theatre Workshops at Harvard twenty of the best Ukrainian poems from the Yara Workshops in award-winning translations by Virlana Tkacz & Wanda Phipps. The hand-made book was designed by Carmen Pujols in 1998. Each book is numbered and signed by the person who assembled it.
