= Kolodiazhne, Volyn Oblast =

Kolodiazhne Колодяжне
- Village
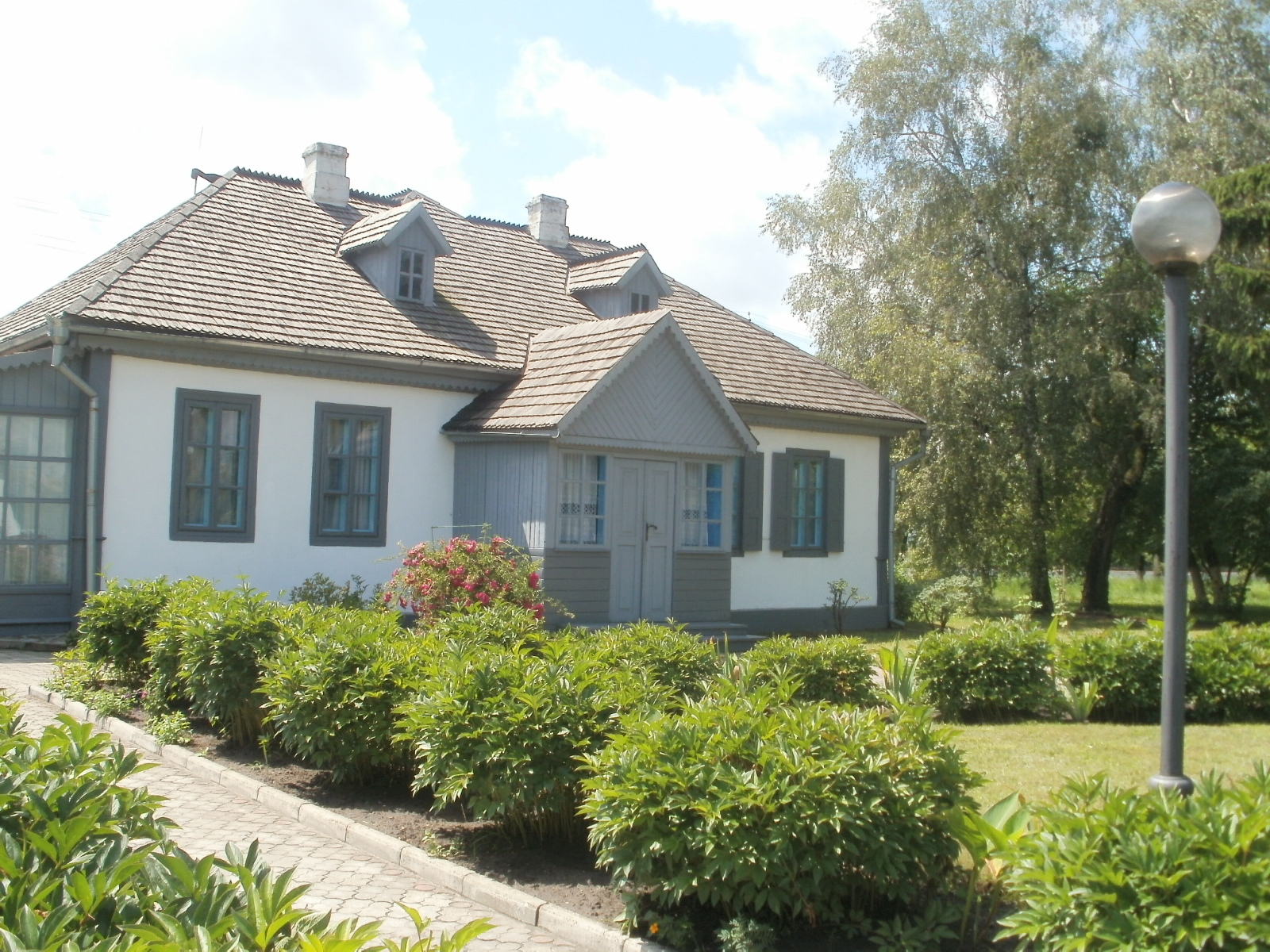
- Lesia Ukrainka museum in Kolodiazhne

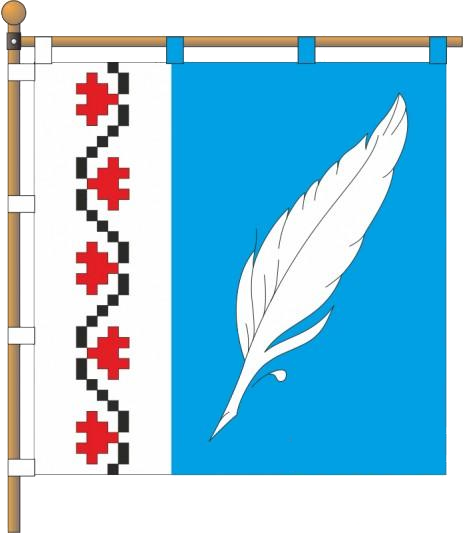
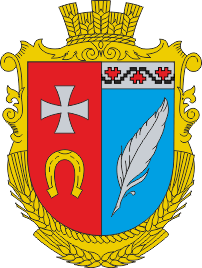
- Flag Coat of arms

- Location within Ukraine Location within Volyn Oblast
- Coordinates: 51°10′42″N 24°48′03″E
- Country: Ukraine
- Oblast: Volyn Oblast
- District: Kovel Raion
- Hromada: Kolodiazhne rural hromada
- Village founded: 1583

Government
  - Village Head: Yaroslav Kushnyruk (Batkivschyna)

Area
  - Total: 2,769 km^{2} (1,069 sq mi)
- Elevation: 178 m (584 ft)

Population
  - Total: 720
  - Density: 0.26/km^{2} (0.67/sq mi)
- Time zone: UTC+2 (EET)
  - Summer (DST): UTC+3 (EEST)
- Postal code: 45061
- Area code: +380 3844
- Website: http://rada.gov.ua/

Kolodiazhne (Ukrainian: Колодяжне) is a village in the Kovel Raion (district) in Volyn Oblast of northwestern Ukraine. It is located about 3 kilometres (1.9 mi) southeast of Kovel on the highway M-19.

== History ==
Kolodiazhne was first mentioned as an important settlement in the Kingdom of Galicia–Volhynia since 1199; it was later a part of the Kievan Rus', which it joined in 1220 although the town was thought to have been settled by Vikings in the 900s who usurped the land from indigenous Slavs. The main occupations of the inhabitants were agriculture and animal husbandry.

As the town was situated near the growing power of the Kingdom of Poland, the inhabitants of the area fought against the Poles eastern expansion and it is thought that the name Kolodiazhne came from the Polish name for handcuffs which was Kajdany, although this was denied by the inhabitants who endured the attacks, some believed the name came down from Kolodka meaning a small log. Whatever the origins of the name, it stuck. The official date of today's town is listed as 1583, perhaps because of its records having been destroyed over the years. The town was located on a transit route, which is why it was always fought over by various invaders. It is said that Napoleon's Grand Army came through the area and at one point in its history it found itself situated right on the Eastern Front during World War 1. The area suffered greatly through both World Wars, especially during World War 2.

== Notable residents ==
The town's most famous resident was the poet Lesya Ukrainka, who got ideas for, and wrote, some of her poems in the area. Today, there is a museum dedicated to Lesya Ukrainka in the village.

Folk tales abound regarding everything from the area's famous muddy, marshy areas, to the various invasions over the centuries
