= Nova Opera =

Ukrainian art collective

NOVA OPERA
- Origin: Kyiv, Ukraine
- Genres: Contemporary opera; avant-garde; experimental music theatre
- Years active: 2014–present
- Awards: Music Theatre Now, Top 10 worldwide for IYOV (2018); Music Theatre Now, Top 6 worldwide for Chornobyldorf (2021); Shevchenko National Prize for IYOV (2020); Best Experimental Performance, Ukrainian Performing Arts Awards for Chornobyldorf (2021); Royal Philharmonic Society Award, Opera and Music Theatre, for Chornobyldorf (2024); Classical:NEXT Innovation Award (2025)
- Members: Roman Grygoriv; Illia Razumeiko
- Website: novaopera.com.ua

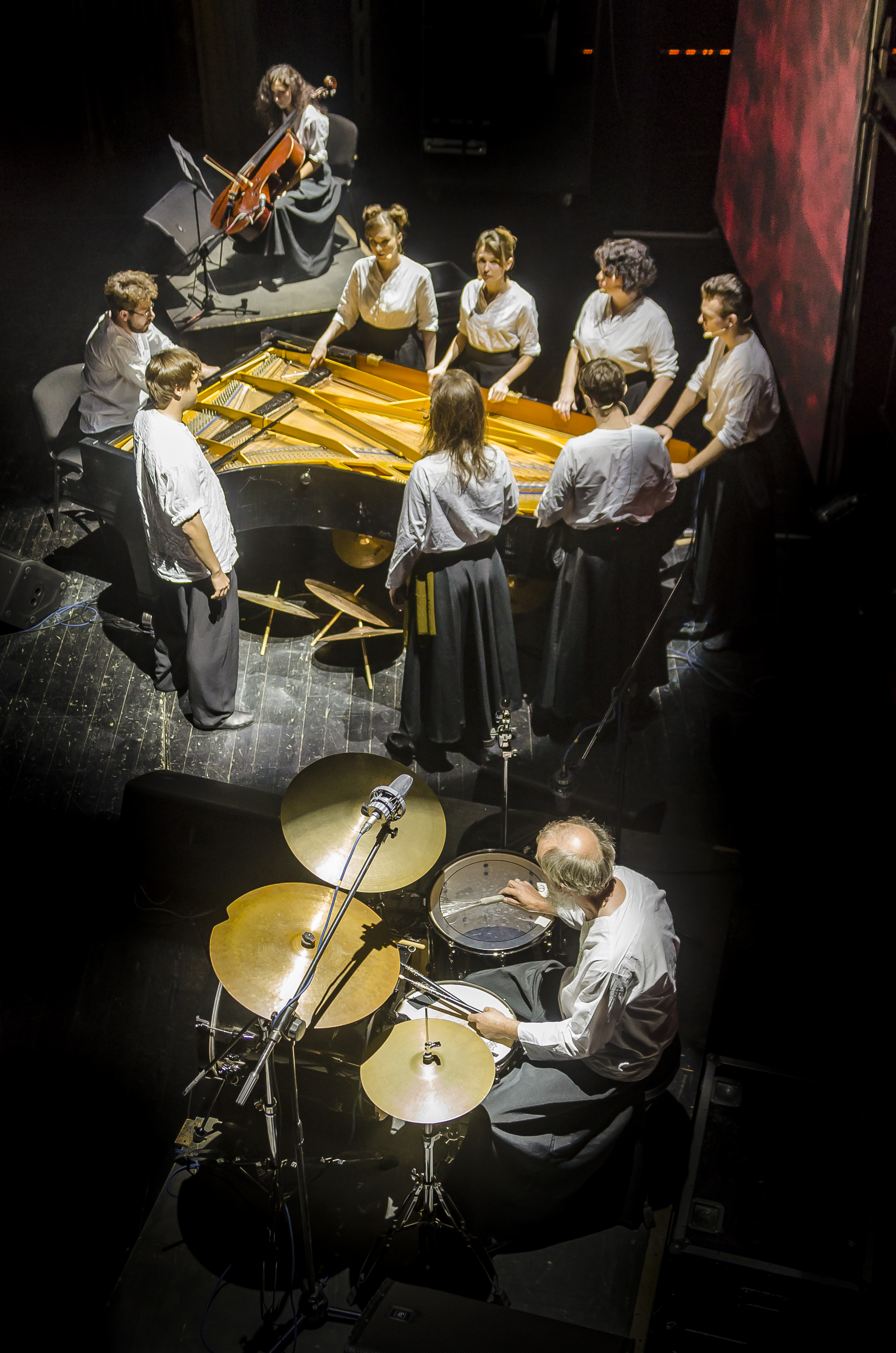

NOVA OPERA is a Ukrainian art collective dedicated to creating new directions in opera and music theatre. Founded in Kyiv in 2014 by director Vladyslav Troitskyi, the group's creative core consists of composers Roman Grygoriv and Illia Razumeiko. The ensemble experiments with synthetic genres that freely combine avant-garde and rock, Gregorian chant, trip hop, neo-baroque, folk improvisation, live electronics, and non-academic performance techniques.

== Background ==
NOVA OPERA was founded in 2014, the same year as the Revolution of Dignity in Ukraine. The post-Maidan period marked an intense renewal of Ukrainian cultural life, with new artistic collectives seeking to build an independent cultural identity. In this context, Vladyslav Troitskyi—already the founder of the Dakh Contemporary Arts Center, the Gogolfest festival, and the groups DakhaBrakha and Dakh Daughters—created NOVA OPERA as a laboratory devoted specifically to reinventing the language of opera.

== History ==
=== Early years and biblical trilogy (2014–2017) ===
The group's first production was an improvisation opera based on William Shakespeare's Coriolanus. Troitskyi and composers Roman Grygoriv and Illia Razumeiko then developed a trilogy of operas on biblical themes that would become the artistic core of the group's identity.

The first part of the trilogy, the opera-requiem IYOV (2015), is based on the Book of Job and premiered on 21 September 2015 at the GogolFest festival, the largest contemporary arts festival in Ukraine. The central instrument of the work is the prepared piano, treated as a full orchestra: performers insert coins, keys, fingers, and drumsticks into the instrument's strings to produce sounds evoking a harpsichord, percussion, or synthesizer. The dramaturgy alternates recitatives drawn from the biblical text with sections of the Catholic Requiem in Latin, while vocal techniques range from classical and jazz singing to throat singing, overtone singing, whispering, and breathing. The work toured Copenhagen, Lublin, the Gdańsk Shakespeare Theatre, the Musikverein in Vienna, Skopje, and New York at the PROTOTYPE Festival. In 2018, IYOV was ranked among the top ten contemporary operas worldwide by the Music Theatre Now competition, out of 436 entries from 55 countries.

The second part of the trilogy, the opera-circus BABYLON (2016–2017), addresses the biblical myth of the Tower of Babel transposed onto an urban contemporary tragedy. The libretto incorporates biblical texts (Genesis, Apocalypse), allusions to Greek mythology, and contemporary literary references, with vocal parts written in 19 different languages, including Mongolian and Chinese. Its structure parodies 19th-century classical opera—with overture, choral scenes, arias, and duets—combined with elements of circus, performance art, and instrumental theatre.

The trilogy was completed with the opera-ballet ARK (2017), a Ukrainian-Swiss co-production with the Totem Dance Group, featuring choreography by Oscar Chacon of Béjart Ballet Lausanne. The libretto is based on the Song of Songs, and the music combines post-minimalism, live electronics, prepared piano, and sampled fragments of folk songs. All three parts of the trilogy were performed at the Vienna Philharmonic, the Macedonian Opera, the Gdańsk Shakespeare Theatre, and the Opera in Lublin.

=== International collaborations (2018–2021) ===
In 2018, NOVA OPERA premiered AEROPHONIA, a futuristic opera whose principal instrument is a legendary AN-2 biplane, as the opening show of the Porto Franko Festival. The same year, in collaboration with the Yara Arts Group (director Virlana Tkacz) and choreographer Simon Mayer, the group premiered the opera-dystopia GAZ, inspired by the 1923 Ukrainian staging by director Les Kurbas of the German Expressionist play by Georg Kaiser. The work explores parallels between contemporary ecological crisis and dehumanising industrialisation, and was performed at the La MaMa Experimental Theatre Club in New York in 2019.

In February 2021, the group presented LE, a re:post-opera based on the poetry of Lesya Ukrainka.

=== War and resistance (2022–present) ===
In April 2022, during the Russian invasion of Ukraine, the opera The Art of War by composer Serhii Vilka premiered in Lviv. The project LINES, music born from the poetry of war, was presented as a musical reflection on the experience of the conflict and an attempt to preserve the memory of Ukrainian resilience.

In 2024, the chamber opera AMANDANTE, with music by Maxim Shalygin and direction by Aïda Gabriels, had its world premiere at the Muziekgebouw in Amsterdam, based on Plato's Symposium in Shelley's translation.

Beginning in 2022, NOVA OPERA joined Opera Out of Opera 2 (OOO2), a cooperative project co-funded by the Creative Europe programme of the European Commission, focused on reimagining classical operas for younger audiences—including productions of Mozart's Le nozze di Figaro, Don Giovanni, Così fan tutte, and Puccini's La bohème.

== Artistic approach ==
NOVA OPERA explores the possibilities of the human voice and uses non-academic performance methods. The prepared piano is a central instrument in the group's repertoire: in IYOV, performers insert coins, keys, and drumsticks into the piano strings to produce sounds evoking a harpsichord, synthesizer, and percussion; in BABYLON, a concert grand and a toy piano are used simultaneously. Productions combine traditional theatre with modern technologies such as VJing, live-electronic music, beatboxing, and body percussion.

The ensemble's work spans a wide range of musical traditions, combining avant-garde composition with rock, Gregorian chant with trip-hop, and neo-baroque structures with folk improvisation. Vocal techniques employed include classical, jazz, and folk singing, as well as throat singing, overtone singing, and theatrical breathing. The group's productions are characterized by the integration of music and theatre, with individual works incorporating elements drawn from opera, oratorio, performance art, and sound installation.

== Productions ==
| Title | Type | Year | Composers / Direction |
|---|---|---|---|
| Coriolanus | Improvisation opera | 2014 | Direction: Vladyslav Troitskyi |
| IYOV | Opera-requiem | 2015 | Music: Roman Grygoriv and Illia Razumeiko; Direction: Vladyslav Troitskyi |
| BABYLON | Opera-circus | 2016–2017 | Music: Roman Grygoriv and Illia Razumeiko; Direction: Vladyslav Troitskyi |
| UnSimple | Overnight opera | 2017 | Music: Roman Grygoriv and Illia Razumeiko; based on a novel by Taras Prohasko |
| ARK | Opera-ballet | 2017 | Music: Roman Grygoriv and Illia Razumeiko; Direction: Vladyslav Troitskyi; Choreography: Oscar Chacon |
| AEROPHONIA | Futuristic opera | 2018 | Music: Roman Grygoriv and Illia Razumeiko; Direction: Rostyslav Derzhypilsky |
| GAZ | Opera-dystopia | 2018 | Music: Roman Grygoriv and Illia Razumeiko; Direction: Virlana Tkacz |
| Wozzeck | Trap-opera | 2019 | Music: Roman Grygoriv and Illia Razumeiko; text: Yurii Izdryk |
| Hamlet | Drama per musica | 2019 | Music: Roman Grygoriv and Illia Razumeiko; Direction: Rostyslav Derzhypilsky; text: Yuri Andrukhovych |
| What is Zarathustra silent on | PhD-opera | 2020 | Based on Thus Spoke Zarathustra by Friedrich Nietzsche |
| LE | Re:post-opera | 2021 | Based on poetry by Lesya Ukrainka |
| The Art of War | Opera | 2022 | Music: Illia Razumeiko and Roman Grygoriv |
| Gaia-24 | Opera | 2024 | Music: Illia Razumeiko and Roman Grygoriv |
| AMANDANTE | Chamber opera | 2024 | Music: Maxim Shalygin; Direction: Aïda Gabriels; premiered in Amsterdam |

== Awards and recognition ==
=== Music Theatre Now ===
In 2018, the opera-requiem IYOV was selected among the top ten contemporary music-theatre works worldwide by the Music Theatre Now competition by International Theatre Institute and Operadagen Rotterdam, which evaluated 436 entries from 55 countries. In 2021, Chornobyldorf was selected among the top six contemporary operas worldwide by the same competition, out of 150 submissions from 30 countries.

=== Shevchenko National Prize ===
In 2020, Roman Grygoriv and Illia Razumeiko received the Shevchenko National Prize, which is Ukraine's highest state award in arts and culture. They received the award for the opera-requiem IYOV.

=== Ukrainian Performing Arts Awards ===
Chornobyldorf received the award for Best Experimental Performance at the Ukrainian Performing Arts Awards in 2021, as well claiming first prizes in the categories of directing, music, choreography, and set design.

=== Royal Philharmonic Society Award ===
Chornobyldorf won the Opera and Music Theatre Award at the Royal Philharmonic Society in March 2024. This awards is widely regarded as the leading annual prize in classical music in the United Kingdom — held at the Royal Northern College of Music in Manchester. The jury cited it as "a breathtaking portrait of humanity's need for spiritual and cultural sustenance in the wake of shattering global events." The win was notable as Chornobyldorf prevailed over productions from the Royal Opera House and other major international companies.

The group has been featured by Opera Europa as a prominent Ukrainian ensemble in international contemporary music theatre.
