= Bouquet Kyiv Stage =

Bouquet Kyiv Stage is an annual arts festival celebrating Ukrainian culture held at Saint Sophia Cathedral in Kyiv, Ukraine. The festival has continued operating during wartime, making over 50 events free to the public.

== History ==
Bouquet Kyiv Stage was launched in 2008 by Evgeni Utkin and Irina Budanska. The festival gained prominence in Ukraine and internationally by promoting popular Ukrainian artists, including DakhaBrakha and pianist Antonii Baryshevskyi.

The festival's name, "Bouquet", is a reference to an artistic series by leading Ukrainian painter Oleksandr Dubovyk, in which all of Ukraine is united together.

"The bouquet is a mega-symbol," Utkin told The Art Newspaper in 2026 about the festival's name. "We couldn't have responded symmetrically. We were armed with this bouquet. It showed our strength."

In 2023, the organizers hosted a springtime edition of Bouquet Kyiv Stage in Tbilisi, Georgia. The theme for that series was "Ukraine + Sakartvelo: Side by Side," translating to the native Georgian name for the country Georgia, and featured performances by a Georgian chamber choir and a piece of electronic music dedicated to Maria Prymachenko.

== Artists ==
Bouquet Kyiv Stage has organized exhibitions, concerts, and panels from leading Ukrainian artists and voices.

Programming has included original series by Ukrainian composer Victoria Poleva, concerts from the Kyiv Camerata, and Israel's Yogev Shetrit Trio.
