= IYOV =

IYOV is an opera-requiem for prepared piano, cello, drums and voices by composers Roman Grygoriv and Illia Razumeiko, directed by Vlad Troitskyi.

== Performance history ==
IYOV was created in 2015 commissioned by the festival of contemporary art Gogolfest.

== Synopsis ==
Job (in Hebrew איוב, Iyov) is the central character of the Book of Job in the Bible. This is a story of his life, pride and disbelief, the search for life's meaning and death, hope and regret.

The center of musical scenography is the prepared piano that turns into a real orchestra. The pianist and singers use a wide range of percussion instruments such as snare drum, marimba and timpani sticks, triangle, ride cymbal. They use coins, keys, fingers and nails for playing on the strings and the body of the grand piano. The instrument sounds like a harpsichord, drums and occasionally as a synthesizer or electronic sounds generator.

Music of IYOV combines minimalism and the avant-garde, neoclassicism and rock. Polyphonic choral episodes and instrumental interludes alternate with the parts that use a full range of the human voice: from classical, jazz and folk singing to breathing, screaming, whispering and overtone singing.

The dramaturgy of music performance is based on the contrasting compilation of recitatives based on the Book of Job and parts of Requiem/Catholic Mass, which refers to traditional Latin texts.

Opera-requiem IYOV is a synthesis of ancient Greek drama, baroque opera, oratorio, Requiem, and the techniques of postmodern theater. It is the mystery of the birth of a new sound inside the piano and the demonstration of endless possibilities of the human voice.

== Cast ==
Voice type	Premiere cast, September 21, 2015 (Conductor: Roman Grygoriv)
soprano	Maryana Golovko
soprano	Anna Marych
mezzo-soprano	Oleksandra Mailliet
baritone	Andrey Koshman
baritone	Ruslan Kirsh
basso	Anton Litvinov
