= Zaxidfest =

Ukrainian annual music festival

Zaxidfest Західфест
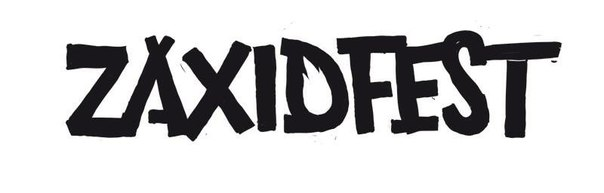
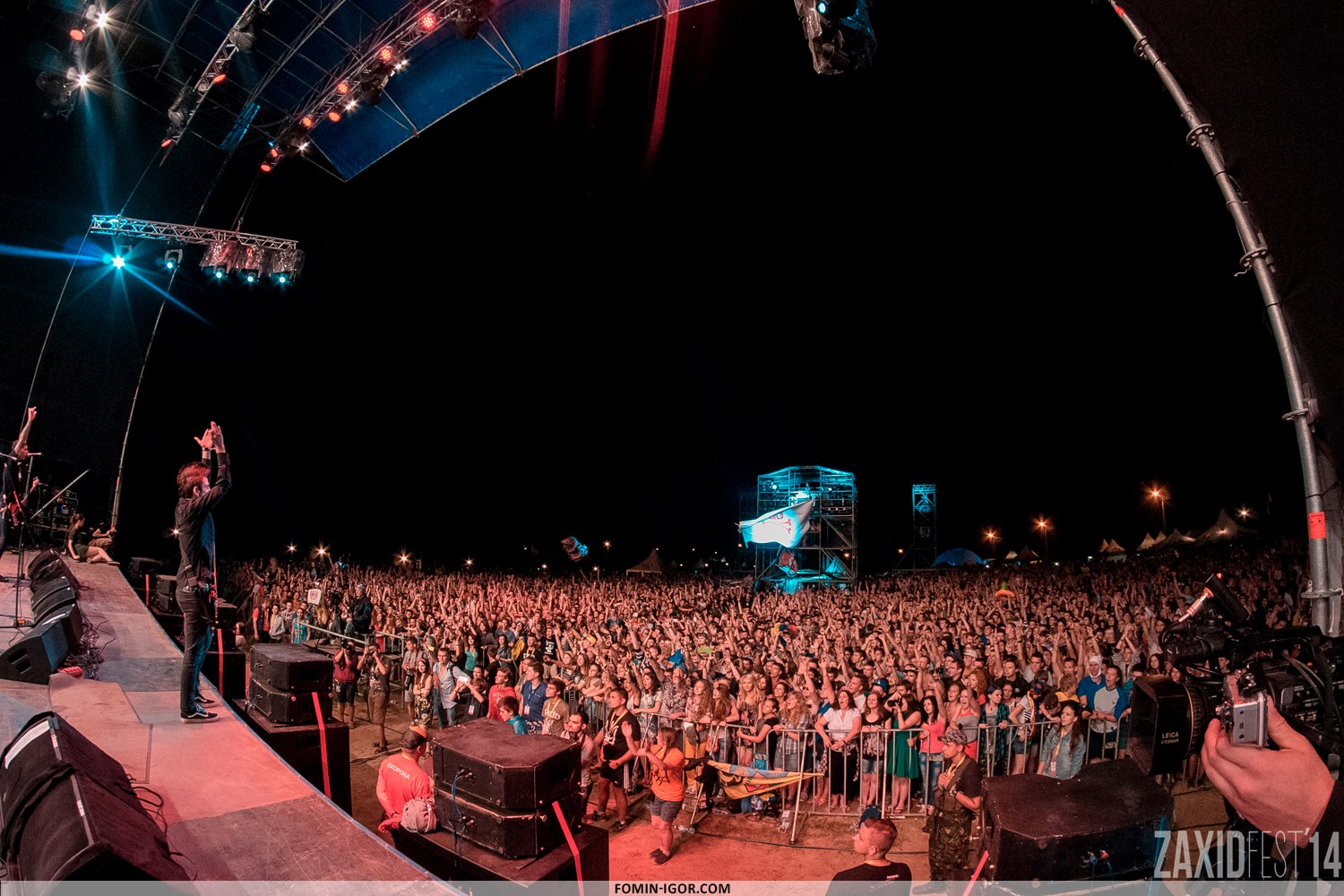
- Genre: Rock, ethnic, indie, electronic
- Dates: 3 days in the middle of August
- Locations: Lviv Oblast, Ukraine
- Years active: 2009–present
- Founders: Yakiv Matviichuk
- Website: zaxidfest.com

Zaxidfest (Ukrainian: Західфест [ˌzɑxidˈfɛst]; previously known as Zaxid, from Ukrainian: захід, lit. ''West'' and ''event'') is an annual international music and art festival held in the middle of August in Lviv Oblast, western Ukraine. Zaxid was founded in 2009 as a festival of Ukrainian rock and ethno music. Later it has lost an attachment to some concrete music genre and was expanded by different foreign artists (including Anti-Flag, Caliban, Clawfinger, Ektomorf, Everlast, Ill Niño, Kreator, Oomph!, Zdob și Zdub and others).

Every year organizers conduct online-survey where anybody can propose and vote for artist. In this way the list of participants is formed. Also some artists are invited based on organizers' initiative and their names are hidden until the tickets sales start.

== Location ==
In 2009 and 2010 Zaxid was held in towns of Zvenyhorod and Stare Selo respectively (around 20 km from Lviv). Since 2011 the festival has been relocated to the village of Rodatychi (around 40 km from Lviv).

== Participants ==
There is a list of some Zaxid participants:

- Alina Orlova
- Anti-Flag
- Atmasfera
- Balthazar
- Behemoth (cancelled)
- BoomBox
- Braty Hadiukiny
- Breaking Benjamin (cancelled)
- Bullet for my Valentine
- Caliban
- Chelsea Grin
- Clawfinger
- Crystal Castles
- Dakh Daughters
- Dark Tranquility
- DevilDriver
- Dymna Sumish
- Editors
- Ektomorf
- Enter Shikari
- Everlast
- Flit
- Flunk
- Guano Apes
- Hollywood Undead
- IAMX
- Ill Niño
- In Extremo
- Jayce Lewis
- Kadebostany
- Krambambula
- Kreator
- Krykhitka Tsakhes
- Khors
- Luk
- Liapis Trubetskoi
- Miss May I
- Noize MC
- Oomph!
- Pain
- Perkalaba
- Qarpa
- Sepultura
- Skriabin
- Tartak
- The Qemists
- Therion
- Tin Sontsia
- TNMK
- Vopli Vidopliasova
- Brutto
- Zdob și Zdub
- Zhadan i Sobaky
- We Butter the Bread with Butter
