= Tin Sontsia =

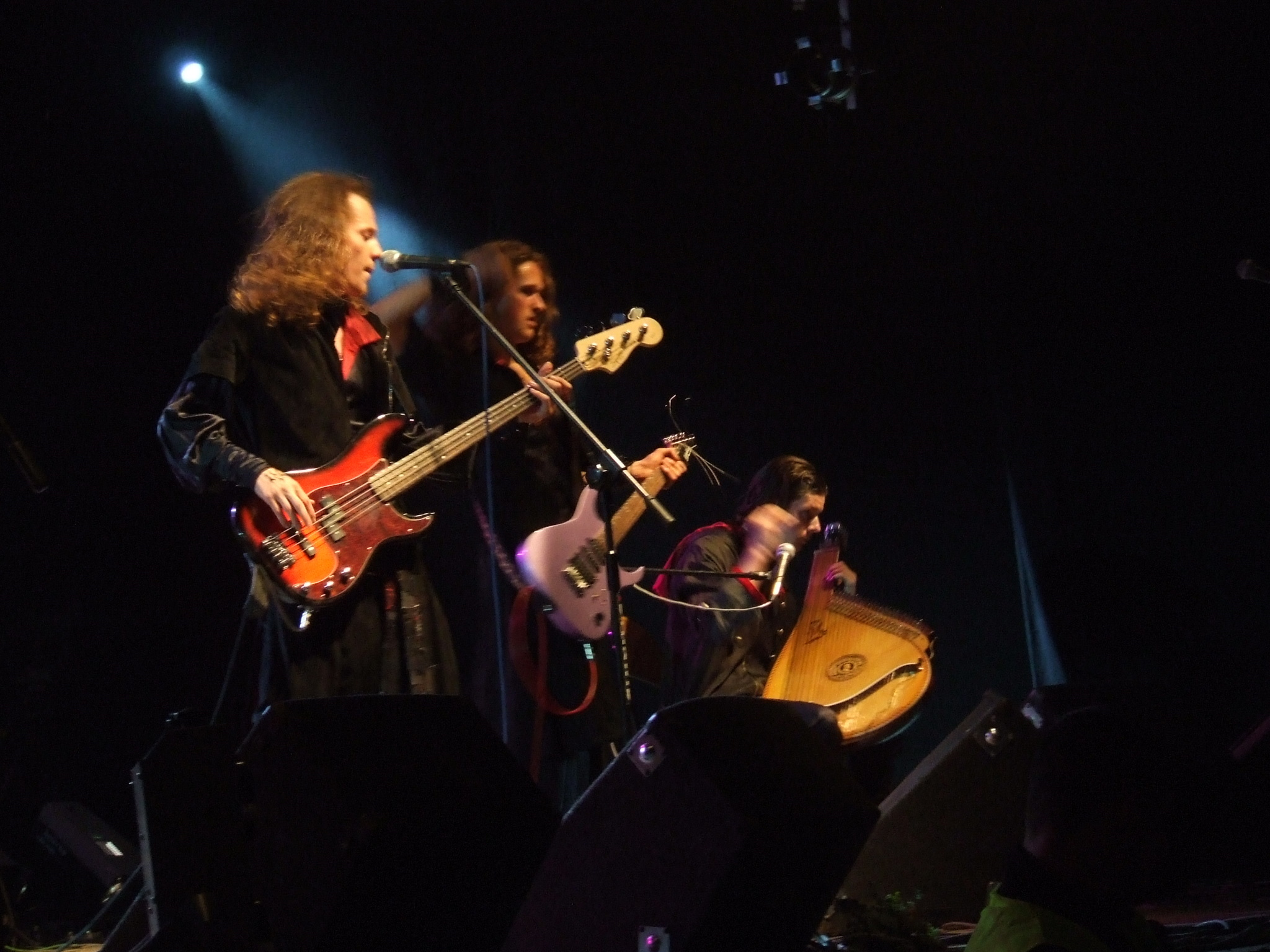
- Tin Sontsia at Basovišča festival, 2007

Background information
- Origin: Kyiv, Ukraine
- Genre: Folk metal
- Years active: 1999–present
- Label: Nash Format
- Members: Serhiy Vasyliuk; Ivan Luzan; Mykola Luzan; Volodymyr Khavruk; Ruslan Mikaelyan; Ivan Hryhoriak

Tin Sontsia (Ukrainian: Тінь Сонця, sometimes literal translations Sun's Shadow or Shadow of the Sun is used) is a Ukrainian folk metal band from Kyiv, although their music contains elements of symphonic metal, as well. Primarily the band's style was close to alternative rock, but in 2003 they have come to a so-called "Cossack rock". Almost all of the lyrics are in Ukrainian except couple of Belarusian songs. The band has taken part in number of festivals the biggest of which are Basovišča and Zakhid. They are known to tour extensively and to support Ukrainian soldiers fighting at the ATO zone. Their song "Kozaky" was the unofficial hymn of the Ukraine national football team during the UEFA Euro 2016 cup. The same song serves as the intro for professional boxer Oleksandr Usyk.

== Members ==
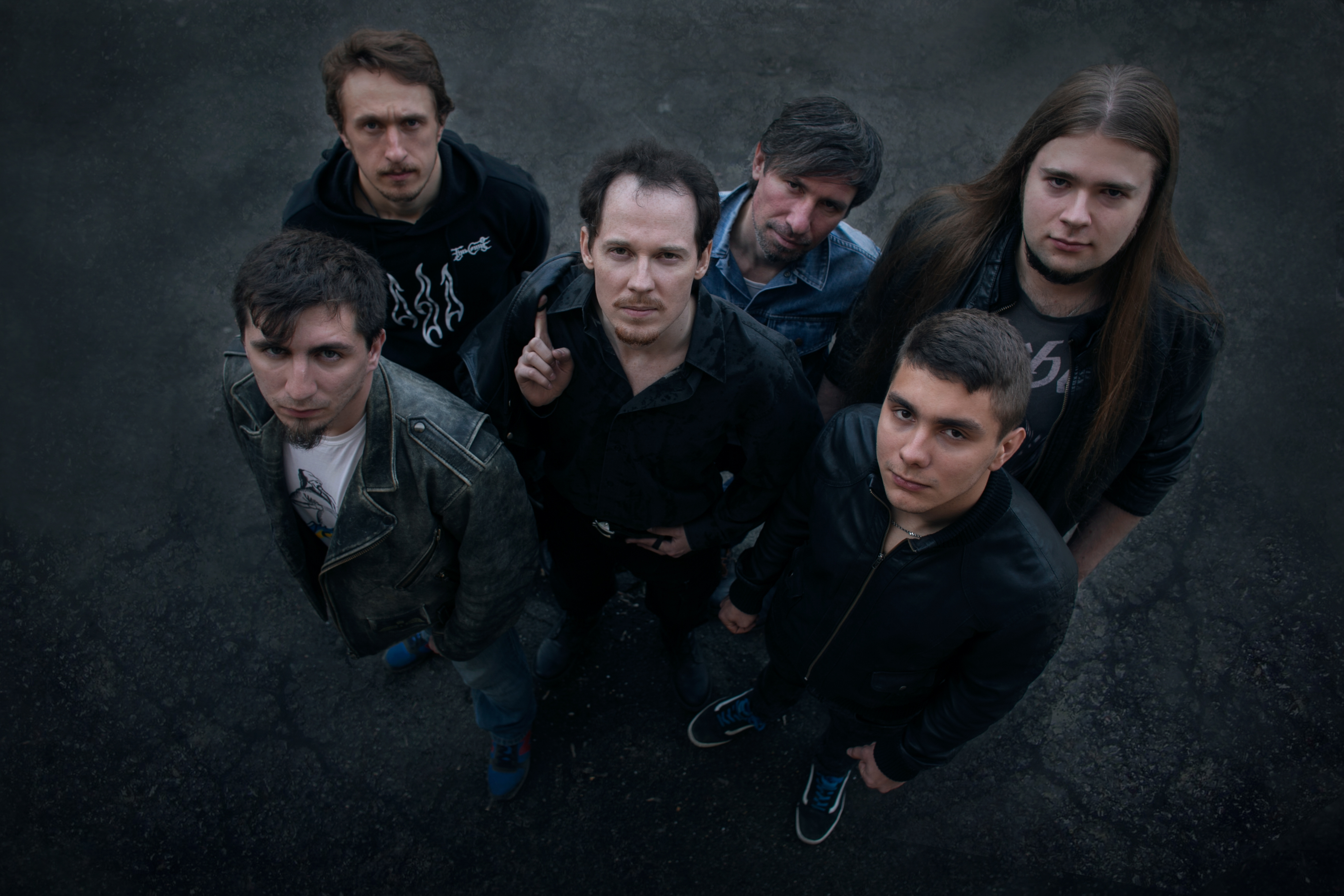
Tin Sontsia in 2016

Current members

- Serhiy Vasyliuk (lead vocal, acoustic guitar)
- Ivan Luzan (bandura)
- Mykola Luzan (guitar, singing)
- Volodymyr Khavruk (drums)
- Ruslan Mikaelyan (guitar)
- Ivan Hryhoriak (bass)

== Discography ==
Albums

- 2002 - Святість Віри (Holiness the Faith, Sviatist Viry, Demo)
- 2005 - За Межею (Beyond the Bound, Za Mezheiu, Demo)
- 2005 - Над Диким Полем (Above the Wild Field, Nad Dykym Polem)
- 2007 - Полум'яна Рута (Flaming Rue, Polumiana Ruta)
- 2011 - Танець Серця (Dance of the Heart, Tanets Sertsia)
- 2014 - Грім В Ковальні Бога (Thunder In The Blacksmith Of God, Hrim V Kovalni Boha)
- 2016 - Буремний Край (Rebellious Land, Buremnyi Krai)
- 2018 - Зачарований Світ (Enchanted World, Zacharovanyi Svit)
- 2020 - На Небесних Конях (On Heveanly Horses, Na Nebesnykh Koniakh)
- 2021 - Тернистий Шлях (Thorny Path, Ternystyy Shlyakh)

Side and solo projects

- 2005 - Зачарований Світ (Enchanted World, Zacharovanyi Svit)
- 2010 - Сховане обличчя (Hidden Face, Skhovane Oblychchia)
