= Tikkle Me =

Swedish band

- Origin: Eskilstuna, Sweden
- Genres: Electropop; indie pop; synth-pop; new rave
- Years active: 2006–2019
- Label: A West Side Fabrication
- Members: Frida Herchenröther; Karin Taberman

Tikkle Me was a Swedish band from Eskilstuna which was formed in 2006 by Frida Herchenröther and Karin Taberman. The band is signed to the Skellefteå-based record label A West Side Fabrication. Herchenröther writes the songs and sings in live performances while Taberman plays the keyboard.

Lately the band included more visual elements of their live performances including background dancers and background projections.

Tikkle Me has played at some of the biggest Swedish festivals, including Peace & Love, Hultsfred, Arvika and Emmaboda; they've also played in Russia, Ukraine (particularly at Gogolfest) and Belarus.

== History ==
The band started in 2006 from members of the now-defunct band Fairy Floss. After years of live performances the band released their EP Butterflies In My Tummy on A West Side Fabrication 2009. The following year, they released their second EP Wake Up on the same label and later the same year, they released their self-titled debut album.

== Discography ==
- 2009 – Butterflies In My Tummy (EP)
- 2010 – Blow My Brains Out
- 2010 – Wake Up (EP)
- 2010 – Tikkle Me (Album)
- 2014 – What is Real (Album)
