= Vladislav Troitsky =

Ukrainian theater actor, director and dramaturge

- Владислав Юрійович Троїцький
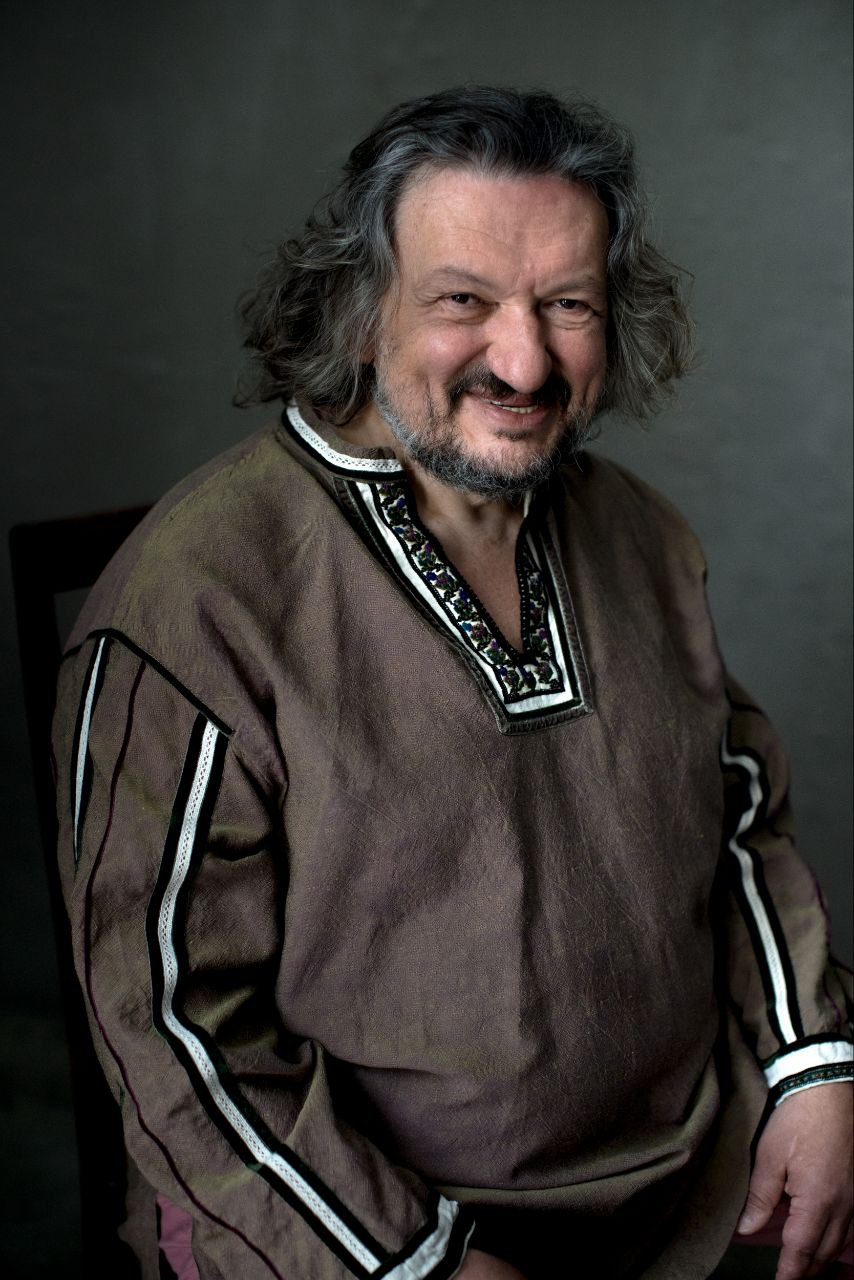
- Vladislav Troitsky (2015)
- Born: 26 November 1964 (age 61); Ulan-Ude, Buryat ASSR, Russian SFSR, Soviet Union (now Buryatia, Russia)

Vladyslav Yuriiovych Troitskyi (Note: Also Vladislav Troitsky, or Vlad Troitsky, as his name is most often spelled in Western Europe.) (Ukrainian: Владислав Юрійович Троїцький, born 26 November 1964) is a Ukrainian theater actor, theater director, dramaturge and radio host of Russian descent, who has received the Shevchenko National Prize for his requiem opera IYOV (Hiob) in 2020.

== Biography ==
Vladislav Troitsky was born in Ulan-Ude, the capital of the south-eastern ASSR Buryatia. He moved with his parents to Ukraine at age eleven, where he graduated in 1987 from the Igor Sikorsky Kyiv Polytechnic Institute in radio engineering. In 1990, he concluded his aspirantur there, too, and in 2002 graduated from a course of studies in directing and acting art at the Russian Institute of Theatre Arts. Subsequently he taught at the national cinema and television university Karpenko-Karyj in Kyiv from 2003 to 2006. Troitsky lives and works in Kyiv.

== Work ==
Starting in the middle of the 1990s, Troitsky was active in the independent theatre and music scene and has left enduring marks with his creations:

- 1994: Foundation of the Dakh theatre, the first independent theatre in Ukraine
- 2004: Foundation of the ethno-chaos-group DakhaBrakha
- 2007: Foundation of the Gogolfest
- 2012: Foundation of the Dakh Daughters Freak Cabarets
- 2015: Production of the IYOV-Opera-Requiem in the context of the project "Nova Opera", together with Roman Hryhoriv and Ilja Rasumejko

Dramaturgical works led Troitsky repeatedly abroad, first to Hungary in 2005, later into Switzerland, Poland and in 2017 to Germany, where he successfully performed in Magdeburg with two productions: Das Mädchen mit den Streichhölzern (the girl with the matches) by Ukrainian author Klim and Dostoevsky's The Village of Stepanchikovo and Its Inhabitants.

Troitsky cooperates especially closely with Wladimir Alekseewic Klim (Klimenko), a playwright, director and dramaturge born in Lviv Oblast.

== Honours ==
- 2001 and 2002: Ukrainian: Київська пектораль, lit. 'Kyiv pectoral'
- 2014: Merited agent of art of Ukraine
- 2018: Officer of the order of arts and literature
- 2019: Wassyl Stus Award
- 2020: Shevchenko National Prize, nominated in category theatre.

== Interviews (selected) ==
- Vlad Troitsky: "Ich war verrückt" (I was crazy), interview with Vanessa Weiss
