= Olena Demyanenko =

Ukrainian film director, producer, screenwriter

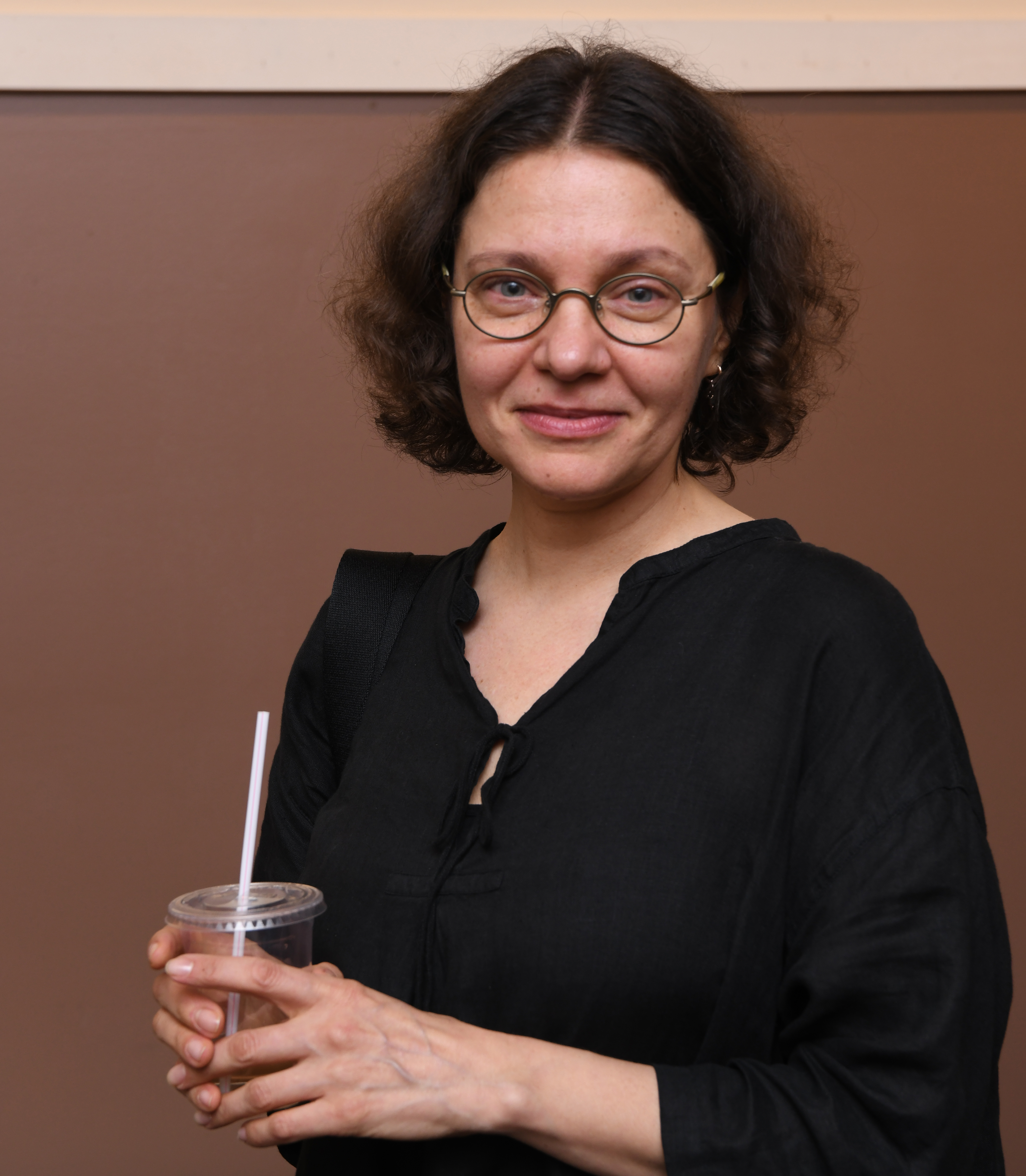
Olena Demyanenko, Toronto, 2019

Olena Viktorivna Demyanenko is a Ukrainian film director, film producer, and screenwriter. She is a member of the National Union of Cinematographers of Ukraine, the Ukrainian Film Academy (since 2017) and the European Film Academy (since 2018). In 1990 she graduated from the Karpenko-Kary Kyiv Institute of Theater Arts.

== Filmography ==
A selection of films she has directed:

- Hutsulka Ksenya (2019) also producer and writer
- Moya babusya Fani Kaplan / My grandmother Fani Kaplan (2016) also producer and writer
- Mayakovskiy. Dva Dnya / Mayakovsky. Two days (8 part TV mini series) (2013)
- F 63.9 Bolezn Iyubvi / F63.9 Love sickness (2013)

== Awards and nominations ==
Winner - 2020 Ukrainian Film Academy Awards (Best Screenplay) for Hutsuilka Ksenya, also nominated for Best Film.

2014 Odesa International Film Festival national competition for F 63.9 Bolezn Iyubvi

2016 Odesa International Film Festival national competition for Moya babusya Fani Kaplan, which was also nominated for

2017 Ukrainian Film Academy Awards (Best Film, Best Director)

She was also nominated in the Ukrainian Film Critics Awards, with Dmitriy Tomashpolskiy, in 2021 (Best Feature Film) for Storonniy (2019).
