= Hutsulka Ksenya =

- Directed by: Olena Demyanenko
- Produced by: Olena Demyanenko
- Production company: Gagarin Media
- Distributed by: B&H Film Distribution Company
- Release date: 7 March 2019
- Running time: 90 minutes
- Language: Ukrainian

Hutsulka Ksenya (Ukrainian: «Гуцулка Ксеня») is a 2019 Ukrainian musical film directed by Olena Demyanenko, based on the operetta of the same name by Yaroslav Barnych.

== Plot ==
Set in 1939 with the occupation of Western Ukraine, the Bolsheviks remain several weeks. In Vorokhta comes an American of Ukrainian origin Yaro (Maxim Lozinsky) to marry a Ukrainian. Only on this condition, he can the inherit large wealth of his father. Yuro is familiar with Ksenia (Varvara Lushchka), which changes his plans.

== Creative group ==
Screenplay — Olena Demyanenko (based on the operetta of the same name by Yaroslav Barnych).

Music — Yaroslav Barnych, Timur Polyansky and freak cabaret "Dakh Daughters".

Tango director — Vyacheslav Grinchenko.

Directed by Olena Demyanenko.

The cinematographer is Dmitry Yashenkov.

Production designer— Yuri Larionov.

Costume designer — Nadiya Kudryavtseva.

Make-up artist — Vitaly Skopelidis.

Editing — Igor Rak.

Sound director — Artem Mostovy.

Executive producer — Eugenia Rauch.

Producers — Olena Demyanenko and Dmytro Tomashpolsky.

== Production ==
=== Estimate ===
Hutsulka Ksenya became one of the winners of the ninth competitive selection of the State Enterprise. The share of financing Derzhkino — ₴ 23.9 million from total estimate in ₴ 47.8 million.

=== Film ===
The shooting pavilion took place at the Kyiv film studio named Dovzhenko on specially built 15 objects. Nature shooting for the film took place in the Carpathians and in the Zhytomyr region.

=== Soundtrack ===
Lyrics and music for the film soundtrack wrote and accomplished the Kyiv Music Group “Dakh Daughters” and other performers.

== Release ==
The film came out in a wide Ukrainian rental on March 7, 2019, Distributor — B&H. The film came out on the Takflix Vod platform on February 27, 2020.

The tape received approvals from Ukrainian film critics.

=== Awards ===
On July 1, 2019, the film won the Grand Prix of the festival “Mt. Fuji — Atami International Film & VR Festival”, which takes place in Japan.

At the IV Golden Whirlwind Film Awards, held on May 3, 2020, in the online show mode, the film was presented in nine nominations (sharing 2-3 places with the film “My thoughts are quiet” and skipping ahead of the film “Home” — 11 nominations). He won two nominations — “Golden Whirlwind Award for Best Composer” (Timur Polyansky, Dakh Daughters Freak Cabaret) and “Best Song” (“Mermaid Mavka”, Dakh Daughters Freak Cabaret).
