= Rudolstadt Festival =

Folk and world music festival in Germany

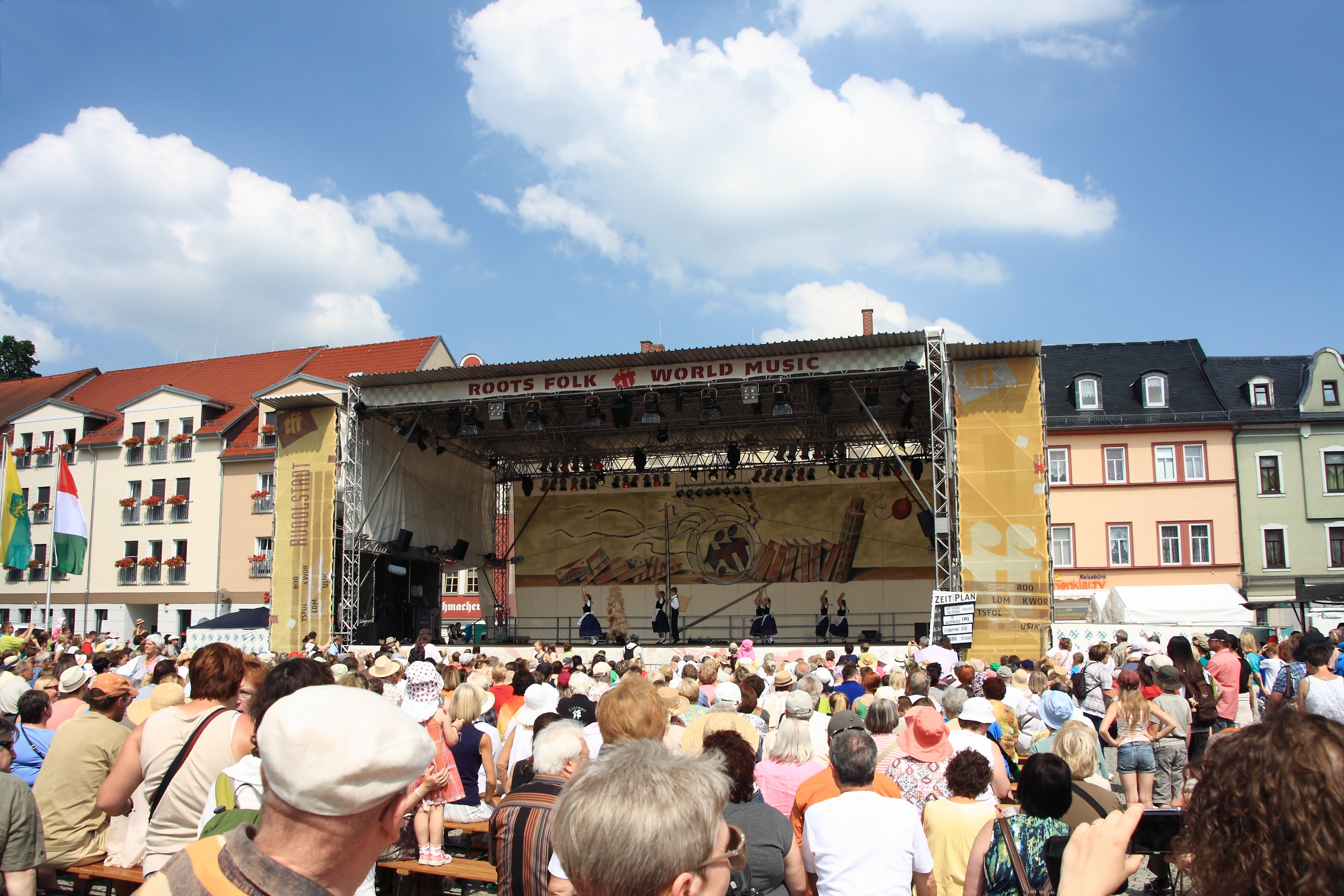
- Rudolstadt city centre during the festival, 2013
- Genre: World music, Folk and Roots music
- Dates: first weekend in July
- Locations: Rudolstadt, Thuringia, Germany
- Years active: 1991 – present
- Website: rudolstadt-festival.de

The Rudolstadt Festival (until 2015 Tanz- und Folkfest Rudolstadt TFF) is the largest festival for folk, roots and world music in Germany. It takes place annually in Rudolstadt, Thuringia, from the first Thursday in July to the following Sunday and is one of the important folk music festivals in Europe.

== History ==
The festival goes back to the former East German Fest des deutschen Volkstanzes (Festival of German folk dancing) in 1955. In line with the official cultural policy, it was intended as a rejection of the "American barbarism of jazz and boogie-woogie". Renamed Tanz & Folk Fest (TFF) Rudolstadt, the first festival in 1991 after German reunification initiated a completely new focus presenting alternative folk and world music styles, also known as part of Roots revival.

In 2016 the festival changed its name to Rudolstadt Festival corresponding to the participation of both German and international bands in the line-up. It is organized by the cultural affairs department of the city of Rudolstadt, a 1240-year-old town of 24,000 inhabitants. Initially, Rudolstadt was chosen to host the event due to its central location in East Germany and the town's historic centre with its parks and castle, undamaged during the war.

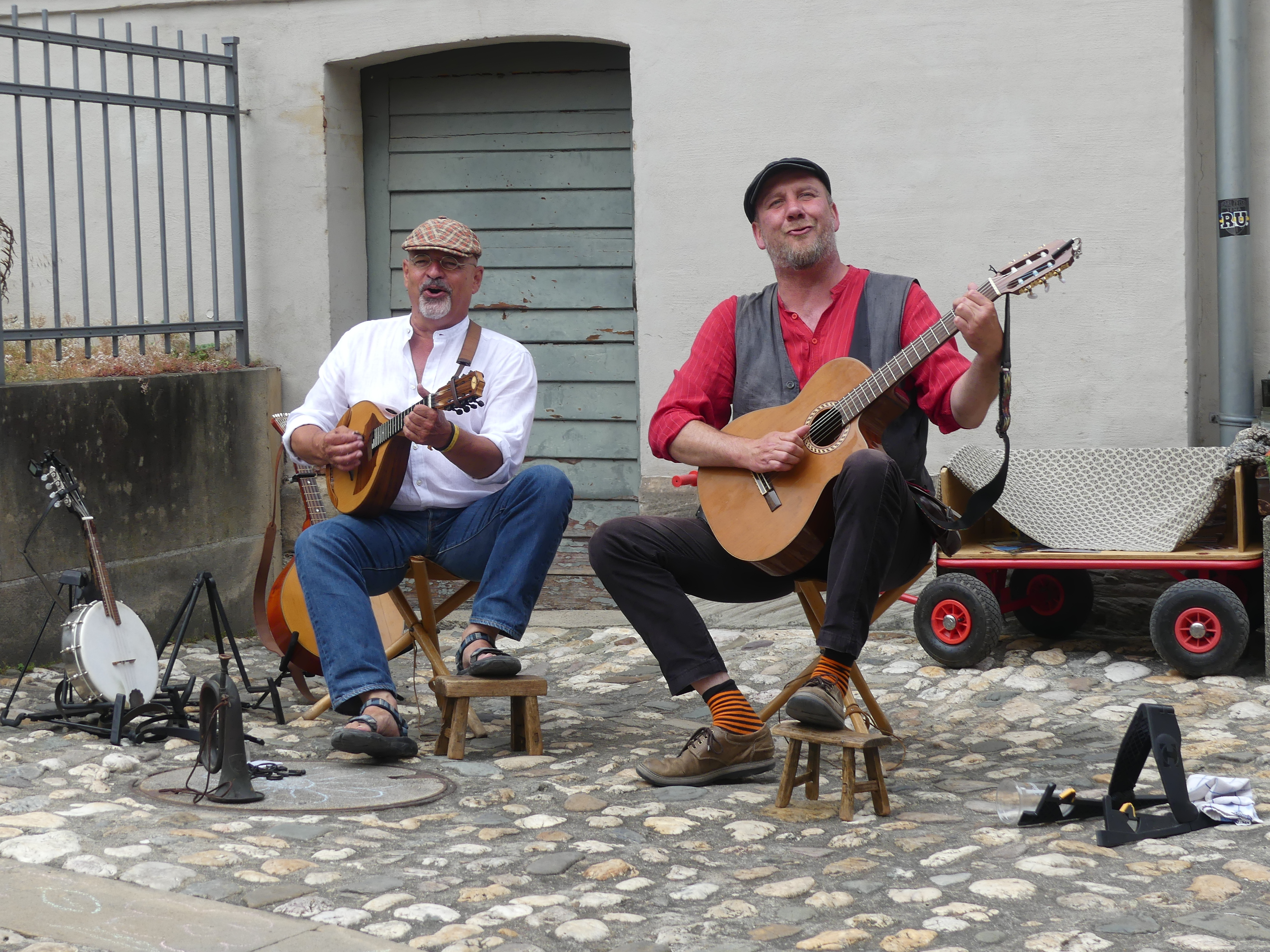
Street musicians at Rudolstadt Festival 2025

Since 2016, the Rudolstadt Festival is spread across multiple locations of the town, including the Heidecksburg castle ruins, the city's market square, and the Heinepark, all of which host multiple stages. According to the organizers, it is one of the important international folk and world music festivals in Europe. The festival budget is mainly covered through the sale of tickets and by sponsors. In 2025, a ticket for all concerts during the four festival days amounted to Euro 132. According to the organizers, the costs are kept low as participating street musicians – other than the main acts – are paid no fee nor travel expenses, but only receive free admission and accommodation on the festival campsite.

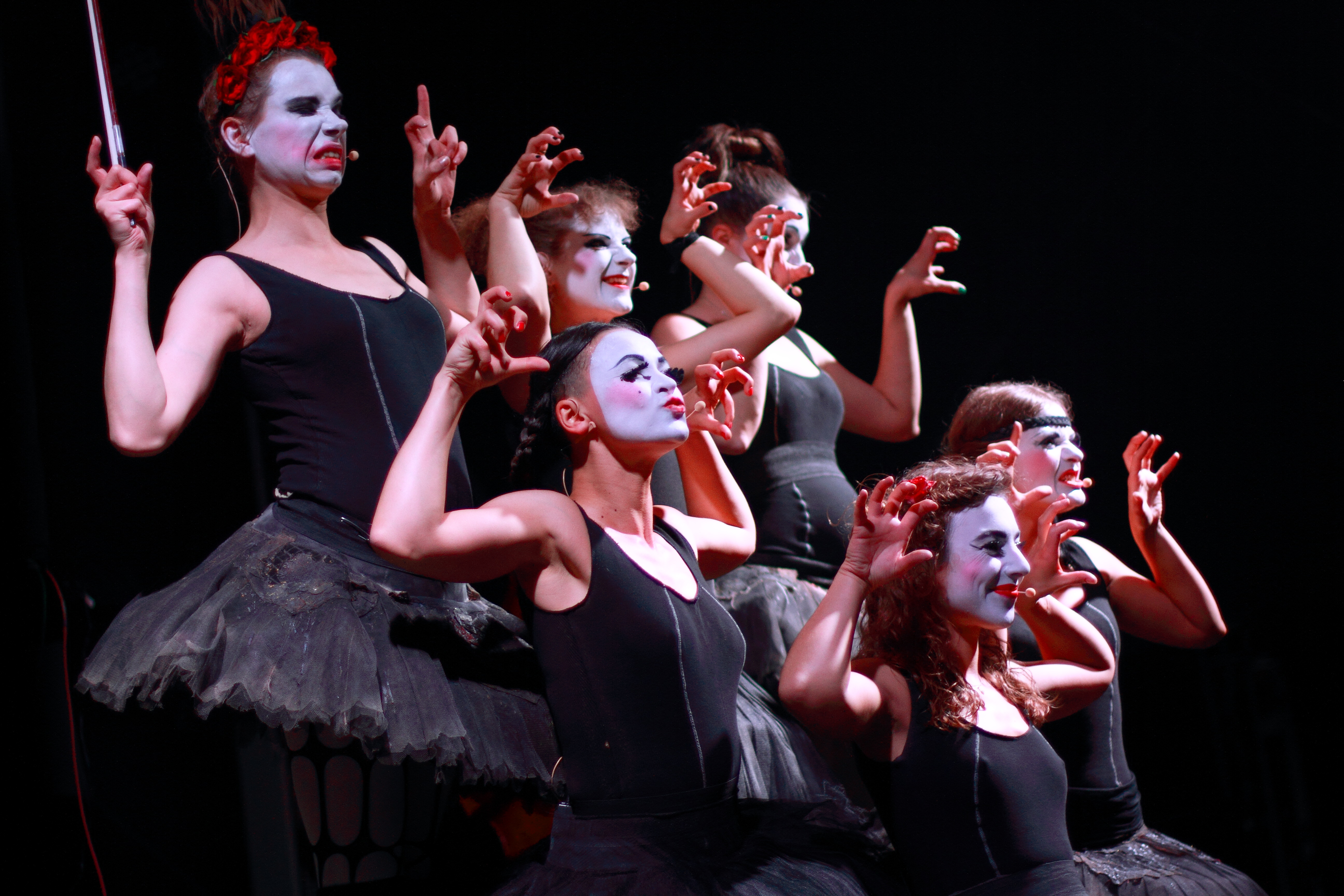
Dakh Daughters from Ukraine at Rudolstadt Festival 2016

During the first full weekend in July, activities start on Thursday evening and last for three days and nights. Every year the whole town is taken over by the festival and swept up in "folk fever", according to Anja Beinroth of Folk World. In 2016 more than 300 concerts on 20 stages took place with 90,000 visitors attending, with similar numbers during following years. Due to restrictions imposed by the COVID-19 pandemic, the festival did not take place in 2020 and 2021. According to the organizers, the 30th festival in 2022 attracted more than 20,000 visitors daily. More than 150 bands performed in 300 concerts, along with street musicians and solo artists from around 40 countries. The closing concerts in Heinepark during that year were performed by Pussy Riot and Goran Bregović & His Wedding and Funeral Band. In 2023 and again in 2025, roughly 1,000 musicians representing some 120 bands from more than thirty countries played for a total yearly crowd of 90,000 music fans.

== Special focus ==
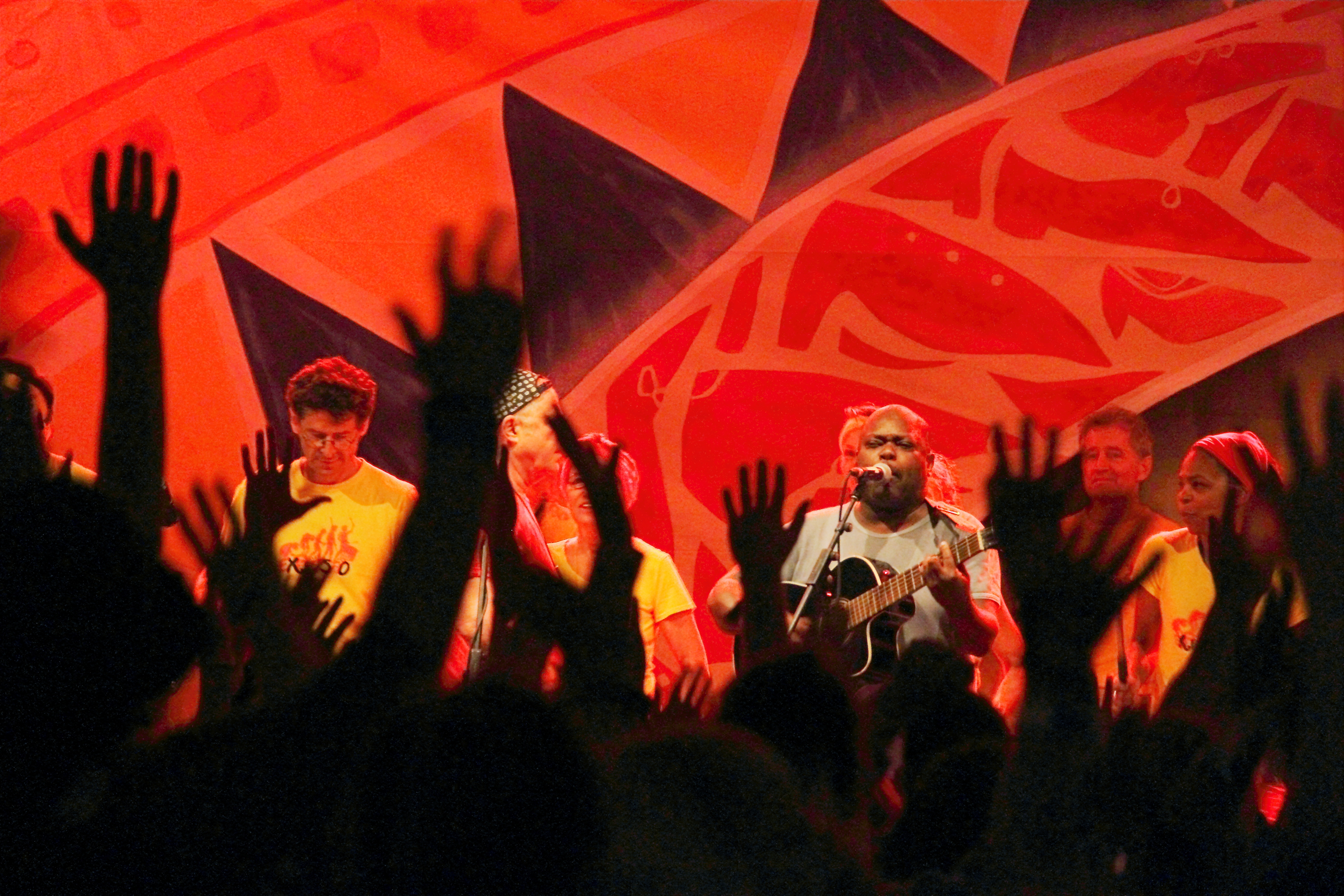
Berlin-based samba group Bloco Explosão during their performance in the Dance Tent, 2016

The festival promotes various types of musical performances. Both German and international bands perform a wide range of styles, including traditional folk music, hip-hop, ethno jazz, punk, rock and techno. All of them incorporate traditional elements into their music – bagpipes played to electronic beats, banjos blending with electric guitars or groups singing traditional folk songs in new arrangements.

During the annual focus on the Guest Country, several bands present current folk-inspired music from their country. In 2012, music from China was featured, with both Peking Opera, music by the Uyghur Muslim ethnic minority, contemporary rock music and a choir for Chinese folk music. In 2016, the Guest Country was Colombia, with groups performing traditional music, cumbia sabanera, Afro-Colombian rock music, Latin American jazz rhythms, reggae and hip-hop from the neighbourhoods of Bogotá.

For the Instrumental Focus, presented from 1991 to 2015, around a dozen artists from different continents were invited, representing their mastery of a specific folk instrument. They played both in their own bands and in the ‘Magic Instrument Group’ – a jam session featuring these artists. They met a week before the festival to prepare the jam session together. For the Dance of the Year, artists perform dances based on folk traditions for everyone to join at various spaces, including the Dance Tent.

In addition, the festival organizes workshops for musicians and craftspeople making instruments, public film showns, discussion forums and a special programme for children. From 1992 to 2001, the festival distinguished notable musicians with an award for the promotion of folk music. Since 2002, this award has been replaced by the German World Music Award Ruth. With some rare exceptions, the festival's success does not rely on famous artists, even regarding the award winners. Among these, well-known German singer-songwriter Hannes Wader was honoured in 2012 with a Lifetime Award.

For every year, the festival has published a booklet about the musical and side events, as well as CDs for some editions. Further, Rudolfstadt-Festival is a member of the European Festivals Association.

== Reception ==
Rudolstadt Festival has mainly been presented in German news media including Deutsche Welle, Deutschlandfunk Kultur, Frankfurter Allgemeine Zeitung, Süddeutsche Zeitung and Mitteldeutscher Rundfunk MDR. Internationally, it has been covered by specialized publications such as World Music Central, the Rough Guide to World Music, a review in Sing Out! magazine and the musicological journal The World of Music.

The online magazine for Latin American music Sounds and Colours called it "The German Woodstock of World Music". In 2017 the documentary film Where Words fail, Music Speaks - Roots, Folk and World Music in Rudolstadt by Josephine Links was shown at the International Festival of Films on Art (Le FIFA) in Montreal, Canada.

Since 2019, the European Broadcasting Union has been reporting from the festival. German public media organization MDR and numerous domestic and international media have been recording or airing concerts live for subsequent transmission.

== See also ==
- Morgenland Festival Osnabrück
- Bardentreffen
- Yiddish Summer Weimar
- Zelt-Musik-Festival
- Tollwood Festival
