= Perkalaba =

- Origin: Ivano-Frankivsk, Ukraine
- Genres: Hutsul-folk, ska, punk rock
- Years active: 1998-
- Website: perkalaba.com.ua

Perkalaba (Ukrainian: Перкалаба) is a Ukrainian band from Ivano-Frankivsk playing music combining elements of hutsul-folk, ska and punk rock.

It is compared to artists like Goran Bregović or Zabranjeno pušenje.

It is named after a tiny Hutzul-village in the Carpathian mountains, which is their musical Zion. They mix all kinds of music of the Ukrainian regions with punk and ska-elements to an energetic Hutzul-Ethno-Ska. It is their freaky show, the charismatic singer and their joy of playing what fascinates the audience even at extended two and a half hours gigs of theirs. Moreover, the band's regular unplugged sessions which are full of nonsense and so spontaneous at all imaginable places are one of their peculiarities.

Perkalaba started their career in 1998 in Ivano-Frankivsk (west Ukraine) and at first played ska punk with slight roots reggae influences in local underground clubs. Later the band turned more towards their roots - Hutzul-music. Initially they toured across Ukraine and then played several gigs in Poland, Russia, Germany, Austria, Switzerland, Holland.

They were finally discovered at the "Rock Existenzia Festival" in Kyiv where the amazed audience realized that they were facing a true gem, that was fooling around with the audience. At the "orange revolution" Perkalaba were also a mainspring and the band was facing their new future. Nowadays the band is popular in Ukraine, Poland and on Folk-Rock festivals all over the world.

The music of Perkalaba is inspired by various ethnic music from around the world, especially from various regions of Ukraine, such as Hutzul, Northern Bukovina and Zakarpattya. Other influences include the punk music of the Pogues' Shane MacGowan, Element of Crime and as well as from reggae music, which includes such bands and artists as Bob Marley, Manu Chao, Skatalites. Now Perkalaba plays in a Balkan beat style mixed with Hutzul roots.

In 2011 they recorded a new album titled "Dido" (Grandfather). One of the songs features Eugene Hutz of Gogol Bordello fame, who is a big fan and friend of Perkalaba. The title of the song is Didoborodaty-2011. The album was presented on December 1, 2011, at the Sullivan Room Kyiv, Ukraine.

Ruslana Khazipova of Perkalaba takes part in the Dakh Daughters project.

== Discography ==
- 2005 - Горрри! / Horrry!
- 2006 - Qzzaargh vs Perkalaba
- 2007 - Горрри! (перевидання) / Horrry! (re-issue)
- 2007 - Говорить Івано-Франківськ / Hovoryt Ivano-Frankivsk
- 2011 - Dido
- 2013 - Джєрґа / Djerga
