= Dakh Contemporary Arts Center =

Theater in Kyiv, Ukraine

- Центр Сучасного Мистецтва
- Interactive map of Dakh Contemporary Arts Center
- Location: Kyiv, Ukraine
- Coordinates: 50°24′50″N 30°31′26″E
- Capacity: 60

Construction
- Opened: 12 November 1994

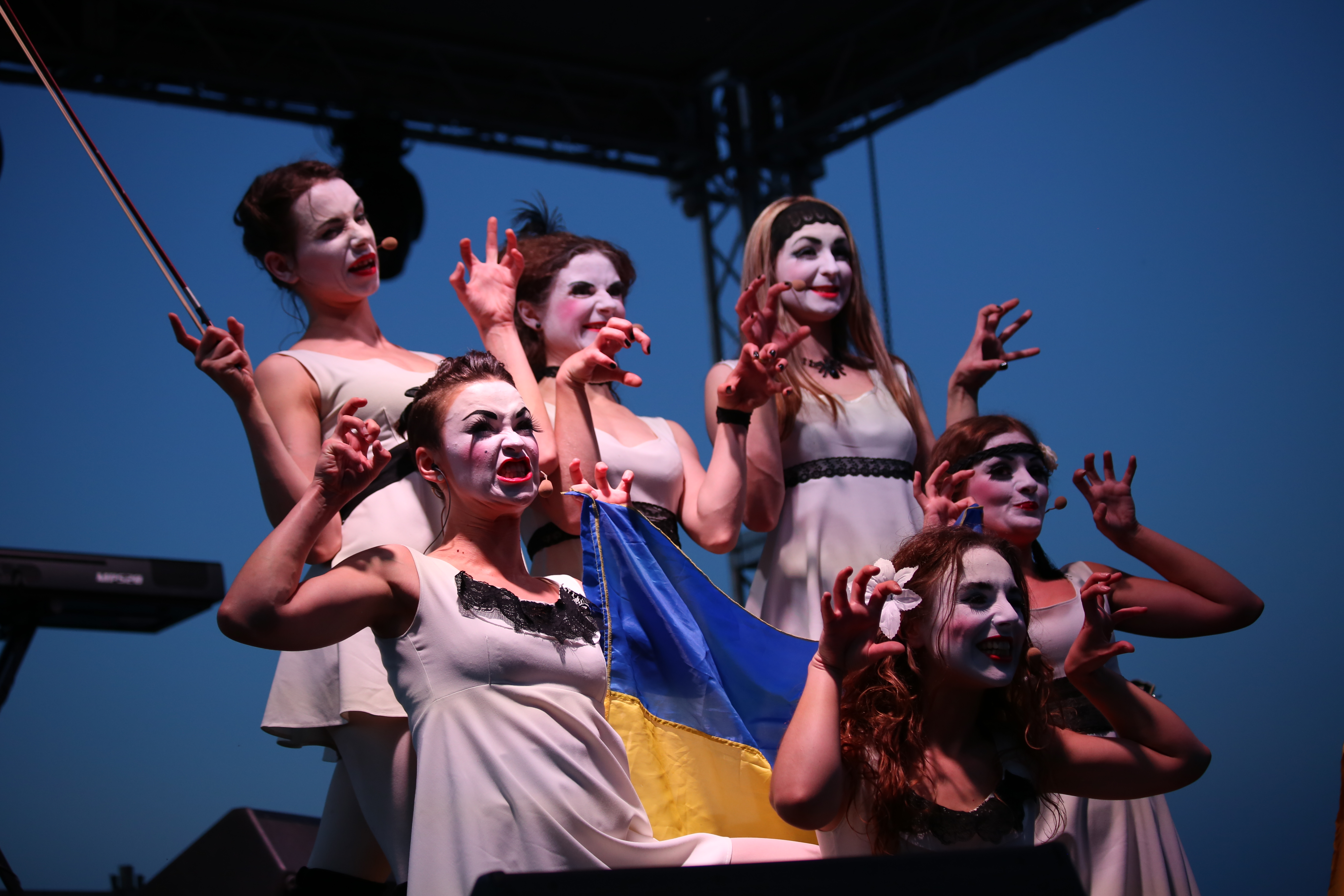
Dakh Daughters performing

The Dakh Contemporary Arts Center is an independent theater and musical venue in Kyiv, Ukraine, on Velyka Vasylkivska Street near the Lybidska metro station. The theater opened in 1994 and its first director was Vladimir Ohloblin. Since opening, the theater has been home to numerous groups including DakhaBrakha, Dakh Daughters, NovaOpera, and TseSho. Today, the theater is led by Vladislav Troitsky.

== General information ==
The Dakh Theater is located in the Holosiivskyi district on Lybidska Square near the Lybidska metro station. The theater is located on the ground floor of a multi-storey building.

Performances in Russian and Ukrainian are staged in the theater.

== History ==
The Contemporary Arts Center "DAKH" was opened on November 12, 1994 by Vladislav Troitsky, who at that time did not link his destiny with the intention to seriously engage in theater and art.

The first director of the DAKH Theater was Volodymyr Ogloblin (1915–2005).

In 2004 the ethno-group DakhaBrakha was founded.

Since 2007, CSM "DAKH" is the main organizer of the international festival of contemporary art GogolFest.

In 2012, the band Dakh Daughters was founded.

In 2016, the social rave of the band CESHO was founded.

== Performances ==
- "Almost a play almost by Pirandello. Reanimation"

Based on the works of Luigi Pirandello, directed by Vladislav Troitsky

- "Pillow Man"

Based on the play by Martin McDonagh Directed by Vladislav Troitsky (premiere February 22, 2009)

- "Medea Theater"

Based on the play by KLIM Directed by Vladislav Troitsky (premiere February 21, 2009)

- “Invertebrate. Evening for people with impaired posture "

Based on the play by I. Lausund Directed by Vladislav Troitsky (premiere – March 13, 2008)

- "Psychosis 4.48"

Based on the play by Sarah Kane Directed by Vladislav Troitsky (premiere – January 2008)

- "AnnA"

Based on the play by Yu. Klavdiera Directed by Vladislav Troitsky (premiere – December 2007)

- "Love Nativity Scene, or Ukrainian Decameron"

Based on the play by KLIM, directed by Vladislav Troitsky

- "Marriage", based on a play by Nikolai Gogol — directed by Vladislav Troitsky
- Mystical Ukraine Project — "Prologue to" Macbeth "(mysterious action). With the participation of" DakhaBrakha "ethnochaos of the group. Director Vladislav Troitsky.
- Mystical Ukraine Project — the second part of the "Shakespearean" cycle "Richard III. Prologue "with the participation of" DakhaBrakha "- ethnochaos of the group director-director Vladislav Troitsky
- Mystical Ukraine Project — the third part of the "Shakespearean" cycle "King Lear" with the participation of "DakhaBrakha" – ethnochaos of the group director Vladislav Troitsky
- Vladislav Troitsky's project based on KLIM plays "… Seven days with an idiot…" or non-existent chapters of FM Dostoevsky's novel "Idiot":
1. day one "sad performance" on the play by KLIM "no It… he… I…" director Vladislav Troitsky
2. day two "… Interpreter of the Apocalypse…." — based on the play by KLIM, directed by Vladislav Troitsky
3. day three "Fallen Angel" — based on KLIM's play "… I… SHE… THEY… HE… or THE FALLING ANGEL" directed by Vladislav Troitsky
4. day four "… Bes-son-Nice…" according to KLIM's play "Bes-son-Nice. and there was evening and there was morning: day four” directed by Vladislav Troitsky
5. day eight "… Idiot" based on the play of the same name by KLIM, directed by Vladislav Troitsky
- «DREAMS OF THE LOST ROAD»

Directed by Vladislav Troitsky with DakhaBrakha – ethno-chaos of the band

- «PROTECTION»

Based on the play by Ani Gilling Directed by Varvara

- "NASTY"

Based on a play by Marius von Mayenburg Directed by Vladislav Troitsky

- "Oedipus. DOG HOUSE"

According to the plays: Sophocles "Oedipus Rex" (translated by Ivan Franko) KLIM "Doghouse. Anti-utopia from the life of the silent majority Director – Vladislav Troitsky

- "KLIM SLOW ART SET", based on plays by KLIM
- "Alice's Dream", based on the play by KLIM
- "Paradoxes of Crime", based on the play by KLIM
- "Anna Karenina", based on the play by KLIM

== Troupe ==
=== 1994–2004 ===
- Vladislav Troitsky
- Tatiana Vasilenko
- Anatoly Cherkov
- Elena Lesnikova
- Alexey Ilyuchenko
- Victor Okhonko
- Natalia Perchishena
- Anna Kuzina
- Alexander Prischepa
- Elena Kushnireva
- Yuliana Lagodenko
- Lyudmila Pletenetska
- Artem Aleksin
- Pavlo Beketov
- Tatiana Nadel
- Oleg Zaitsev
- Alexander Snigurovsky
- Anna Rybak
- Tatiana Tereshchenko
- Pavlo Yurov

=== 2002–2014 ===
- Tatiana Troitskaya
- Irina Gorban
- Marko Galanevich
- Natalka Bida
- Dmitry Yaroshenko
- Igor Postolov
- Solomiya Melnyk
- Vladimir Minenko
- Ruslana Khazipova
- Cherry
- Zo
- Nina Gorenetska
- Olena Tsibulska
- Iryna Kovalenko
- Victoria Litvinenko
- Roman Yasinovsky
- Daria Bondareva
- Dmitry Kostyuminsky
- Vasily Belous
- Oleksandra Oliynyk
- Anna Nikitina
- Vera Klymkovetska
- Tatiana Gavrilyuk
- Maria Volkova
- Lida Petrova
- Anna Breus
- Anna Khokhlova
- Anastasia Shevchenko
- Sergey Dovgolyuk
- Andriy Dushny
- Mykola Bondarchuk
- Alexey Needed
- Mammoth
- Maxim Demsky
- Natalia Perchishena
- Andriy Palatny
- Anna Okhrimchuk
- Sergey Okhrimchuk
- Eugene Ball
- Semyon Brain

=== 2016 – present ===
- Tatiana Troitskaya
- Elena Lesnikova
- Andriy Palatny
- Vera Klymkovetska
- Igor Dimov
- Semyon Kisly
- Vladimir Lutikov
- Vladimir Rudenko
- Alexandra Indik
- Alexander Martinenko
- Marusya Ionova,
- Marichka Shtyrbulova
- Katerina Petrashova
- Nadiya Golubtsova
- Igor Mytalnikov
- Vladislav Gogol
- Sonya Baskakova
- Mykola Stefanik
- Khrystyna Slobodyanyuk
