= Dakh Daughters =

Ukrainian music and theater project

- Genres: freak-cabaret, dark cabaret
- Years active: 2012–present
- Members: Solomiia Melnyk, Ruslana Khazipova, Natalka Bida, Anna Nikitina, Zo, Tetiana Havryliuk, Nina Garenetska
- Website: dakhdaughters.com

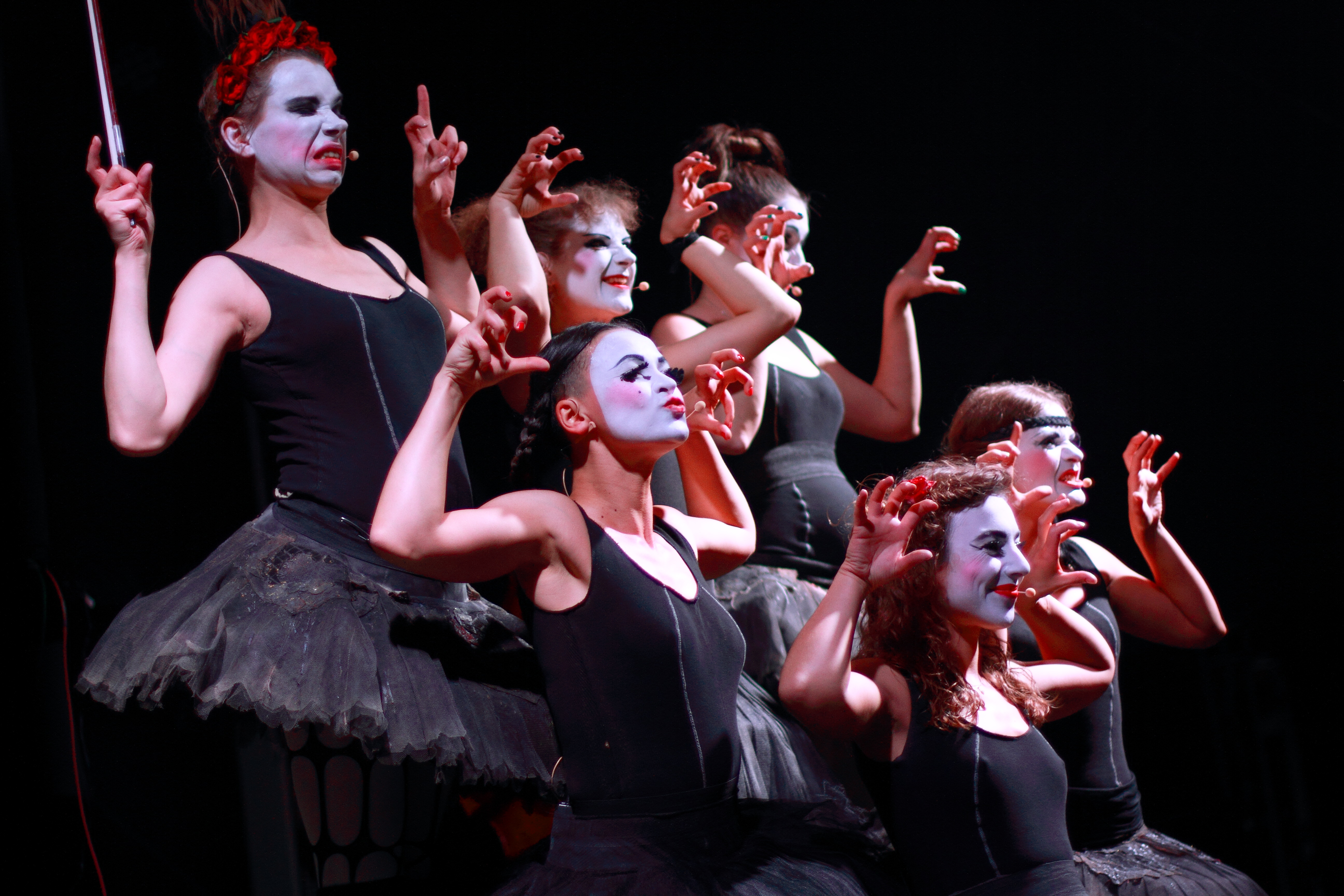
Dakh Daughters at Rudolstadt-Festival 2016.

Dakh Daughters is a Ukrainian music and theatre project started in 2012 in Kyiv. The band consists of seven women, who play on various instruments and sing in different languages (Ukrainian, English, French, German, Russian) and dialects of Ukrainian. They often use texts by famous authors in their lyrics (e.g. Taras Shevchenko, William Shakespeare, Joseph Brodsky, Charles Bukowski, Shaggy).

Dakh Daughters participants are members of different projects such as DakhaBrakha and Perkalaba. The band's name derives from the Dakh theater which is associated with the project.

The band became famous after publishing on YouTube the music video "Rozy / Donbass", based on Shakespeare's Sonnet 35 and Ukrainian folk songs. Also well-known is the video of their live performance on Maidan Nezalezhnosti in Kyiv during the early Euromaidan protests in December 2013.

Dakh Daughters has performed in various Ukrainian cities, as well as outside of the country (in Poland, Czech Republic, France, Russia and Brazil). They have taken part in such events as Zaxidfest, Gogolfest, Silent films festival in Odesa etc.

The first band's studio album, IF, containing 9 tracks, was released in November 2016. The second, AIR, came out in April 2019.

Dakh Daughters was featured prominently in the 2019 Ukrainian musical comedy film Hutsulka Ksenya.

"Through their music and their songs, it is the notions of heritage and identity that are questioned, summoning both classical texts – such as Shakespeare's Sonnet 35 – and Ukrainian folk songs. These poems or stories sung, chanted, rapped, always question the universal and timeless struggle of Man for the defense of his freedom and his affiliations. Thus, the Dakh Daughters manage to elaborate a poetry of anger to the rhythm of the drums of war, the sobs of the violins and the frenzied hope of 'Ukraine on fire'."

They performed at WOMAD in 2023 where their freaky cabaret style was well received.

== Members ==
The band consists of seven women, who all are both singers, musicians and actresses in the Dakh theater:

- Solomiia Melnyk
- Ruslana Khazipova (who is also a member of the band Ragapop, and a former member of Perkalaba)
- Natalka Bida
- Anna Nikitina (who is also a member of the band Ragapop)
- Zo
- Tetiana Havryliuk
- Nina Garenetska (who is also a member of the band DakhaBrakha)

== Discography ==
- If (2016)
- Air (2019)
- Make Up (2021)
- Pandora's Box (2025)
