= DakhaBrakha =

Ukrainian folk music group

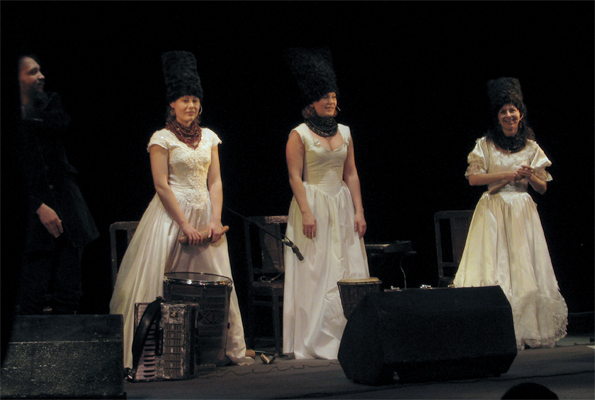
- DakhaBrakha in Lviv in 2009

Background information
- Origin: Kyiv, Ukraine
- Genres: Contemporary folk
- Years active: 2004–present
- Members: Marko Halanevych; Olena Tsybulska; Iryna Kovalenko; Nina Harenetska
- Website: dakhabrakha.com.ua

DakhaBrakha are a world music quartet formed in Kyiv, Ukraine. The four musicians combine a variety of musical styles from across the globe, creating energetic and artistic performances that are uniquely their own. DakhaBrakha's eclectic sound seamlessly mesh ancient Ukrainian folk tunes with modern genres, such as pop, punk, electronica, hip hop, and soul, a musical fusion that they define as "ethno-chaos".

DakhaBrakha are a project of the Dakh Contemporary Arts Center, led by Vladyslav Troitskyi and born as a live theatre music group. Troitskyi continues to be the band's producer.

Members of DakhaBrakha participate in the centre's other projects, notably in the all-female cabaret project Dakh Daughters, as well as in the annual Gogolfest festival.

They were a winner of the Sergey Kuryokhin Contemporary Art Award in 2009 and the Shevchenko National Prize in 2020.

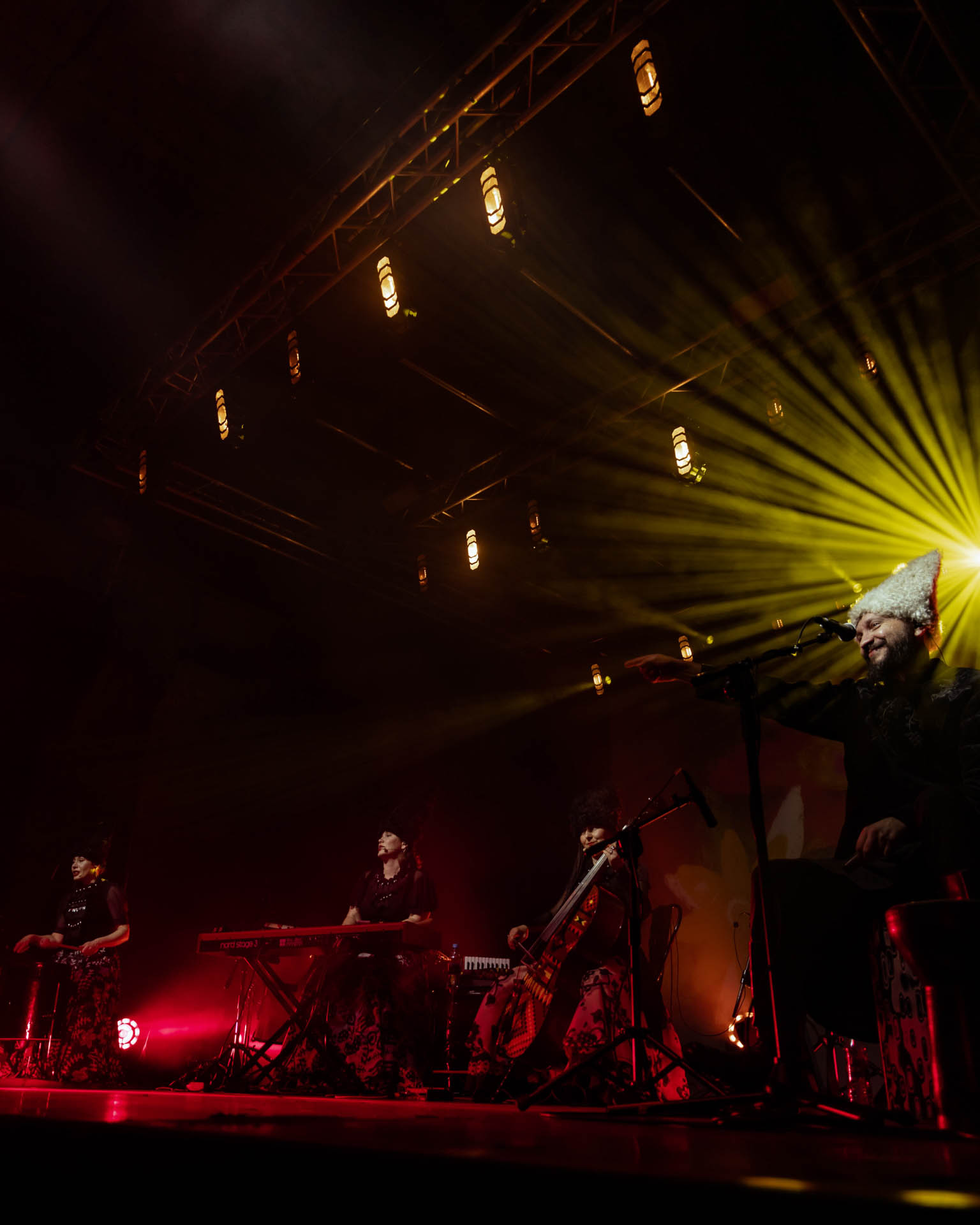
DakhaBrakha 2022 Poland

== Origin and name ==
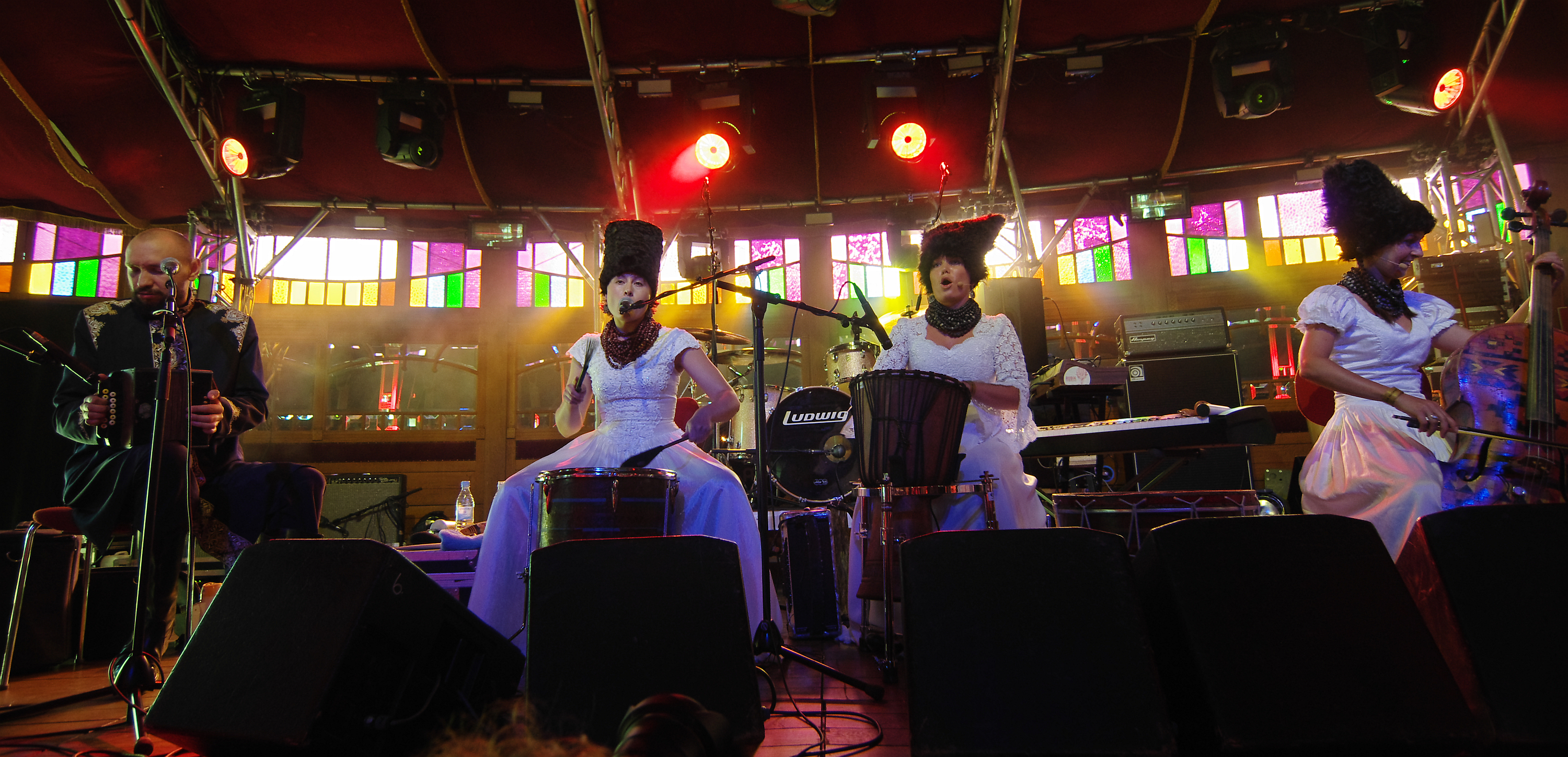
DakhaBrakha performing at the Haldern Pop festival in 2013

DakhaBrakha were originally a daughter project of the Ukrainian avant-garde theatre Dakh and its artistic director Vladislav Troitsky. The group's name derives from the Ukrainian verbs Давати, 'Give' and Брати, 'Take', while also playing on the Art Centre's name "Dakh" (literally "roof" in Ukrainian).

== Festivals ==
DakhaBrakha performed in June 2014 at the Bonnaroo Music and Arts Festival held in Manchester, Tennessee. DakhaBrakha were invited to participate through the globalFEST showcase. They were proclaimed by Rolling Stone as "Best Breakout" of the festival.

They played at the Glastonbury Festival on the West Holts. They performed in July 2017 and July 2018 at the Finger Lakes GrassRoots Festival of Music and Dance held in Trumansburg, New York. In 2017, they performed at the South by Southwest festival (SXSW) in Austin, Texas. DakhaBrakha performed at the 2017 Sziget Festival in Hungary. In 2018, the group performed with Latvian group Tautumeitas at Latvia's World Music Festival Porta 2018. In 2019, they performed at the Michael Schimmel Center for the Arts in Manhattan.

They performed during the first weekend of the 2022 New Orleans Jazz & Heritage Festival in New Orleans, Louisiana.

DakhaBrakha played at the Festival International de Louisiane in Lafayette, Louisiana, on 30 April 2022, and in July 2022 at the Newport Folk Festival.

As part of the Hardly Strictly Bluegrass Festival, annually held each Fall in Golden Gate Park, San Francisco, DakhaBrakha played at the Towers of Gold stage on October 6, 2024.

== Film appearances ==
In 2023, when the Ukrainian animation Mavka: The Forest Song (based on the play The Forest Song by Lesya Ukrainka) was released, the audience saw an animated version of the band members as characters of the animation. Soundtracks of the Mavka animated film were also performed by DakhaBrakha due to the ethnic motives required by the film's plot. "The team recreated the ethno dance and other ceremonial elements with the help of experts from the Ivan Honchar Museum National Centre for Folk Culture. The music for this episode is an authentic vesnianka performed by the DakhaBrakha band: the musicians not only created the song for Mavka, but also appear in the cartoon as Lukash's friends, village musicians".

In 2024, their music was featured as the soundtrack for Ukrainian/American documentary antiwar film Porcelain War, with the artists giving permission for the filmmakers to use their entire discography including unreleased music. The credits scene also includes a recorded live performance of their song "Vesna".

== Other performances ==
- January 2014: NPR's series, NPR Music Front Row.
- January 2014: John F. Kennedy Center for the Performing Arts in Washington, DC.
- April 2015: NPR's Tiny Desk concert series.
- 2017: radio station, KEXP.
- 2021: NPR's Tiny Desk (home) concert series.
- 24 April 24 2023: Elbphilharmonie in Hamburg.
- 30 March 2024: Farquhar Theatre at the University of Victoria.
- 15 April 2026: Pattichio Theatre in Limassol.

== Influence on other artists ==
A portion of the song "Vesna" (Весна) from the band's 2009 album Na mezhi (На межі) appears in the first three minutes of Aki Onda's 2023 album Transmissions From The Radio Midnight as part of a Hungarian broadcast captured by Onda.

== Members ==
- Marko Halanevych – vocals, goblet drum, tabla, didgeridoo, harmonica, accordion, cajón, jaw harp, trombone
- Olena Tsybulska – vocals, bass drum, percussion, garmoshka.
- Iryna Kovalenko – vocals, bass drum, djembe, flute, buhay, piano, ukulele, zgaleyka, accordion, percussion
- Nina Harenetska – vocals, cello, percussion

All of the members except Marko Halanevych are graduates of the Kyiv National University of Culture and Arts. Nina Garenetska also takes part in the Dakh Daughters project.

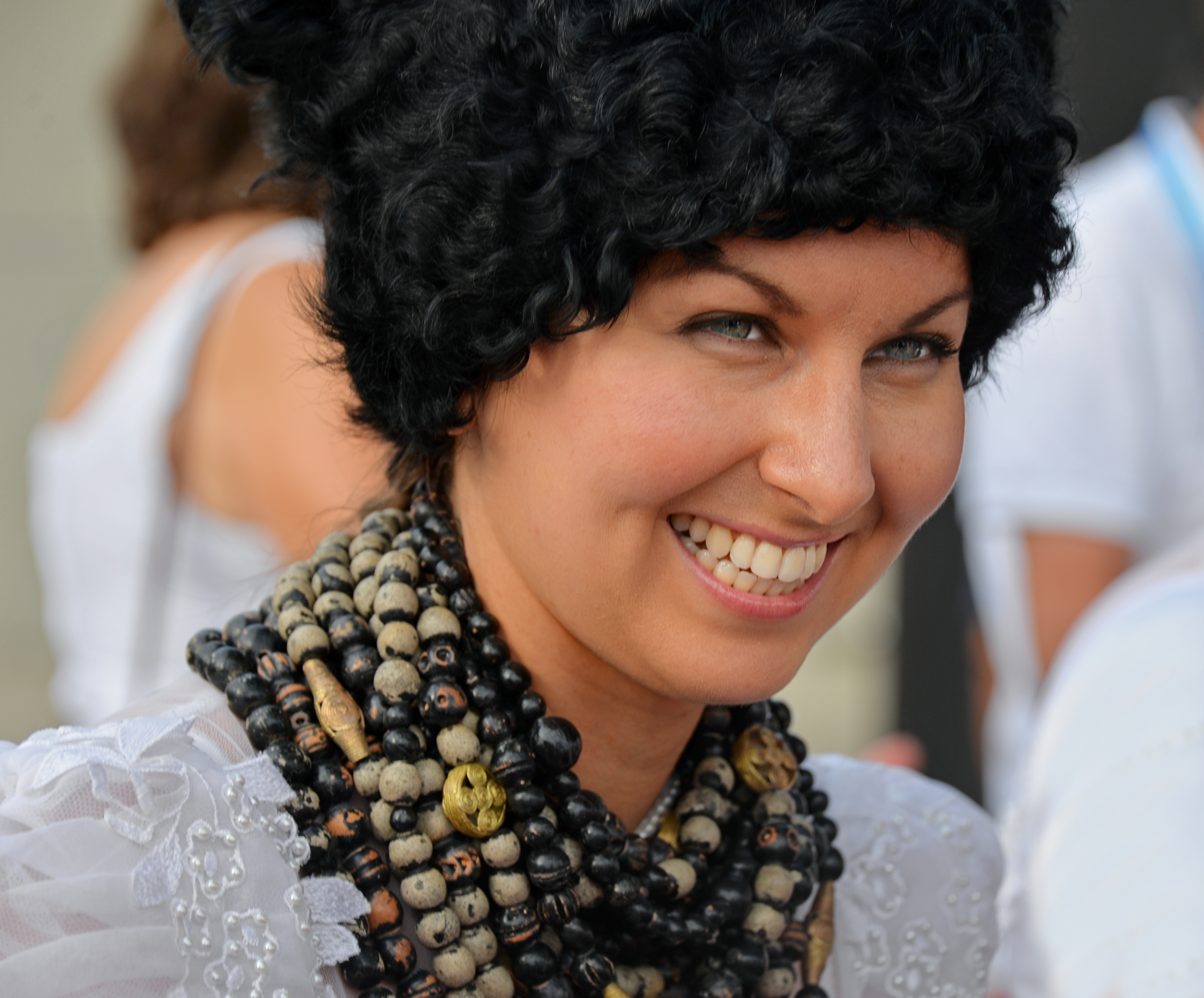
Nina Harenetska

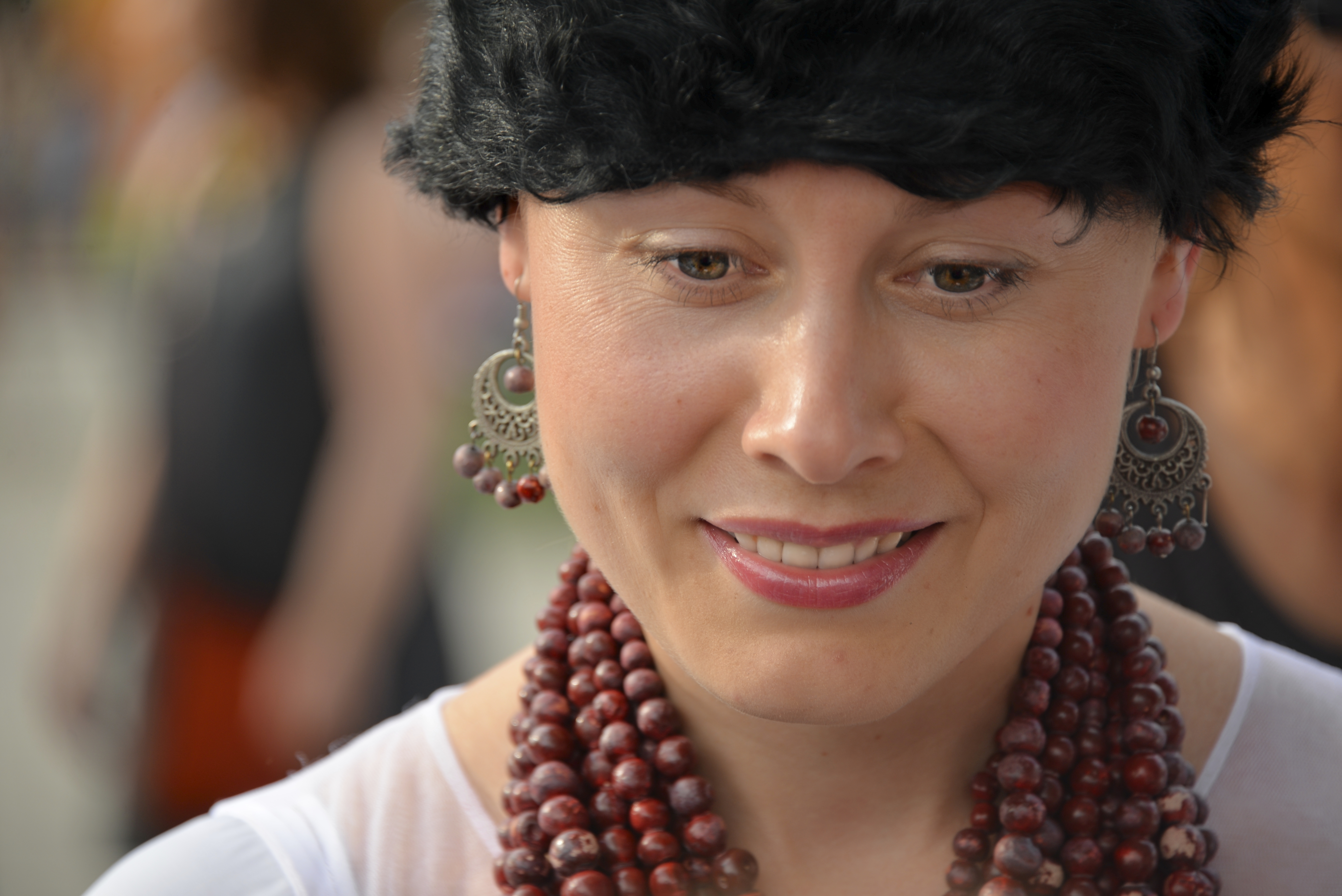
Olena Tsybulska

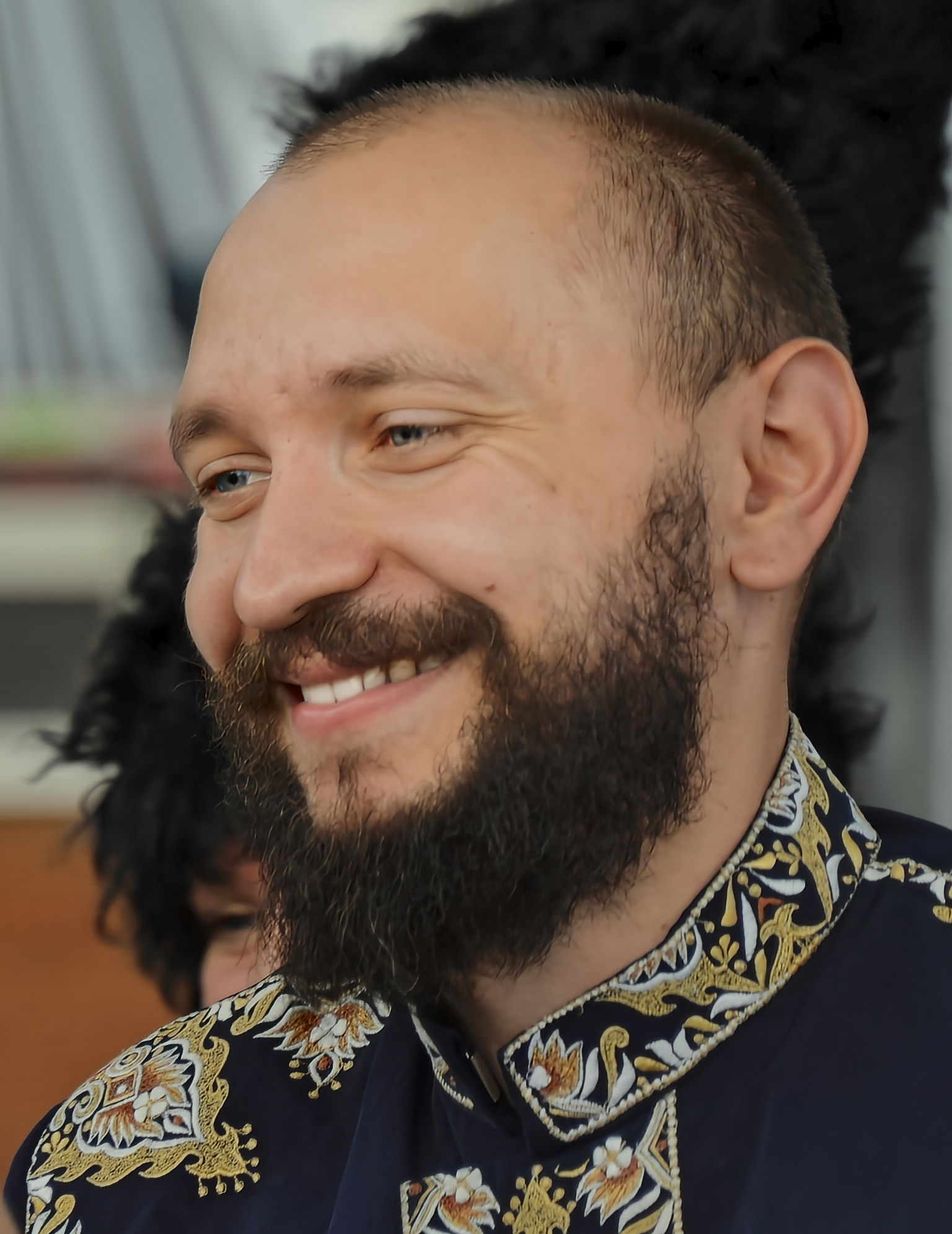
Marko Halanevych

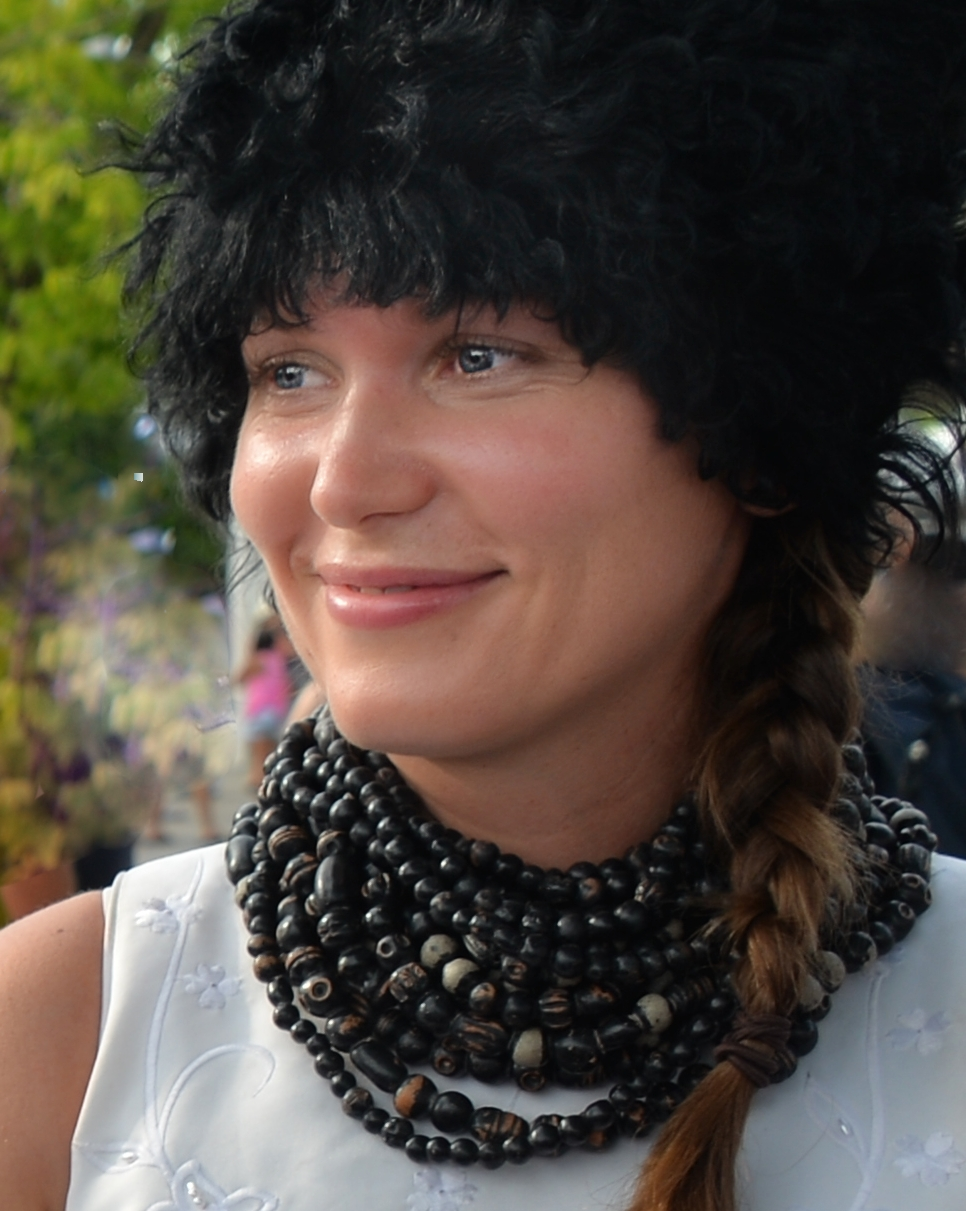
Iryna Kovalenko

== Discography ==
- Na dobranich (На добраніч, 'Goodnight') (2005)
- Yahudky (Ягудки) (2007) [English: Berries]
- Na mezhi (На межі) (2009) [English: On the Verge]
- Light (2010)
- Khmeleva project (Хмелева project) (2012)
- The Road (Шлях) (2016)
- Alambari (2020)
- Ptakh (English: The Bird) (2025)

=== Soundtracks ===
- 2024 – Full soundtrack for Porcelain War (United States/Ukraine)
- 2018 – Trailer song for House 99, David Beckham's grooming brand (United Kingdom)
- 2017 – Bitter Harvest (Canada)
- 2017 – Mavka: The Forest Song (Ukraine)
- 2017 – Fargo (United States)

== Awards and nominations ==
=== Berlin Music Video Awards ===
The Berlin Music Video Awards is an international festival that promotes the art of music videos.

Year	Nominated work	Award	Result	Ref.
2026	"9 nedilechok"	Best Performer	Nominated	
