= Evgeni Utkin =

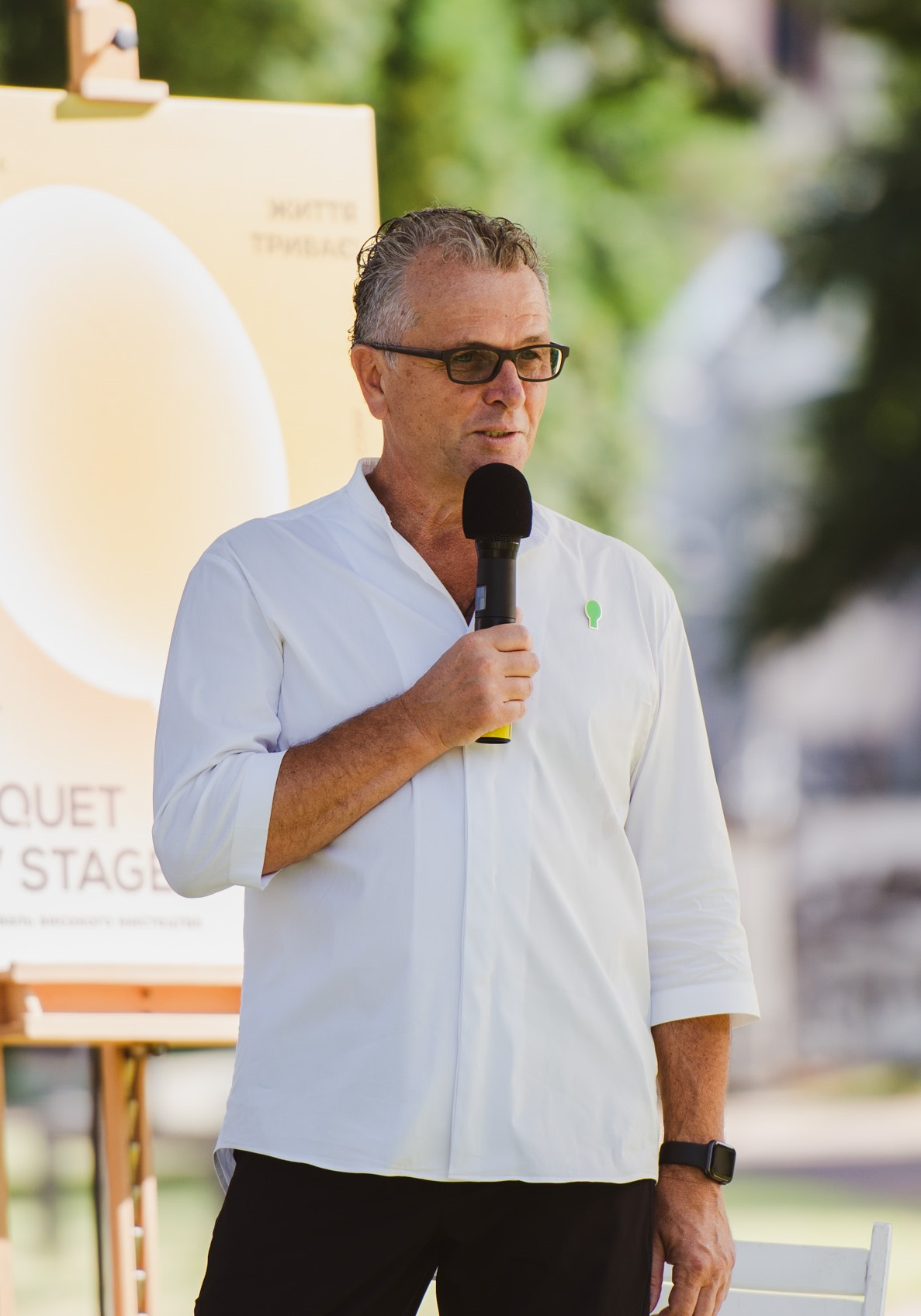
Evgeni Utkin

Evgeni Utkin (born in 1958, Donetsk, Rostov Region, USSR) is a Ukrainian entrepreneur and one of the pioneers and leaders of the high-tech industry in CIS and CEE, a philanthropist, active in promotion of Ukrainian culture through his support of art and music projects both in Ukraine and Europe. Chevalier of The Order of Arts and Literature.

== Biography ==
Utkin graduated:

- Moscow Institute of Electronic Engineering, majoring in "Microprocessor Systems" (1982, Moscow, USSR);
- the AMP (advanced management program) for top managers of the INSEAD Business School (2001, France);
- the "Innovative Business Management" program of the International Institute for Management Development Business School (2008, Switzerland);
- the Venture Capital Executive Program of the Haas School of Business, Berkeley University (2009, USA).

2011-2012 - trainings at the IESE Business School "Global CEO Program" at ESE (Brazil), Wharton School (USA), CEIBS (China) Business Schools.

From 1975 to 1976 he worked as an electrical fitter at the Zahidna mine (Donetsk, Rostov region); from 1980 to 1982 he was an employee of the Research Institute of Precision Technologies (Zelenograd), in 1982 - 1990 (consecutively) an engineer, head of the laboratory, chief designer of Kyiv Research Institute of Micro Devices.

In 1990 he founder-led the company "Kvazar-Micro", where he served as president and chairman of the board.

In 1999, he founded an Internet holding, which included Relcom Telecom, IP Telecom, UkrOP, and Ukrainian Portal.

In 2005, he sold 51% of the "Kvazar-Micro” shares to AFK "Sistema". In February 2006, Evgeni Utkin became the Head of JSC Sitronics which was created on the basis of Kvazar-Micro, Mikron plant (Zelenograd), Czech company Strom Telecom and Greek company Intracom Telecom. Under his leadership, the company entered the London Stock Exchange with a market capitalization of 2.3 billion US dollars and became the largest hi-tech company in Eastern Europe. In October 2007, Evgeni Utkin resigned from Sitronics.

In June 2009, Utkin's company "Kvazar-Micro Securities" bought the "Kvazar-Micro" business line and brand from Sitronics.

In 2009, Evgeni Utkin together with former employees of Kvazar-Micro, created the high-tech holding KM-Core, which started a number of technological companies, such as: De-Novo, a Ukrainian provider of IaaS and data center cloud services; KM-Ware, software developer; PolytEDA, a developer of automated microcircuit design tools; KM-Disty, distributor of computer equipment and electronic components; KM-Labs, a developer of nanomaterial technologies.

In 2010-2013, Utkin became a co-founder and investor in a number of technological startups in Ukraine, Russia, Europe, Israel, and USA.

In 2014 Utkin's companies terminated their activities on the territory of the Russian Federation.

In 2015, together with partners, he founded companies engaged in dual-purpose technologies: UARPA - Ukrainian advanced research project agency; UARMS - production of protective helmets (TOR, TOR-D) and other protective equipment for dual use purposes.

From 2022 — platoon commander in the "Ukroboronprom" battalion as part of the territorial defense of Kyiv.

He is married, father of four children.

== Social activities ==
Evgeni Utkin is active in civic and cultural life. In 1998-2001, he was the chairman of the Council of Entrepreneurs under the Cabinet of Ministers of Ukraine.

He is a co-founder of the cultural and educational center "Dom Master Klass", Gogolfest and Bouquet Kyiv Stage festivals.

Utkin is an active participant of the Orange Revolution (2004) and the Revolution of Dignity (2013-2014).

In 2008-2018 he was a participant of the World Economic Forum - Global Growth companies, Global Agenda Counsel, Technology Pioneers.

He is a member of the board of “ASPEN Kyiv”.

== Honors ==
- "Businessman of the Year" of Ukraine (1997);
- Merited Industry Worker of Ukraine;
- Honorary Diploma of the Cabinet of Ministers of Ukraine,
- Knight of the Ordre des Arts et des Lettres of France
