= Illia Razumeiko =

Ukrainian composer

- Ілля Разумейко
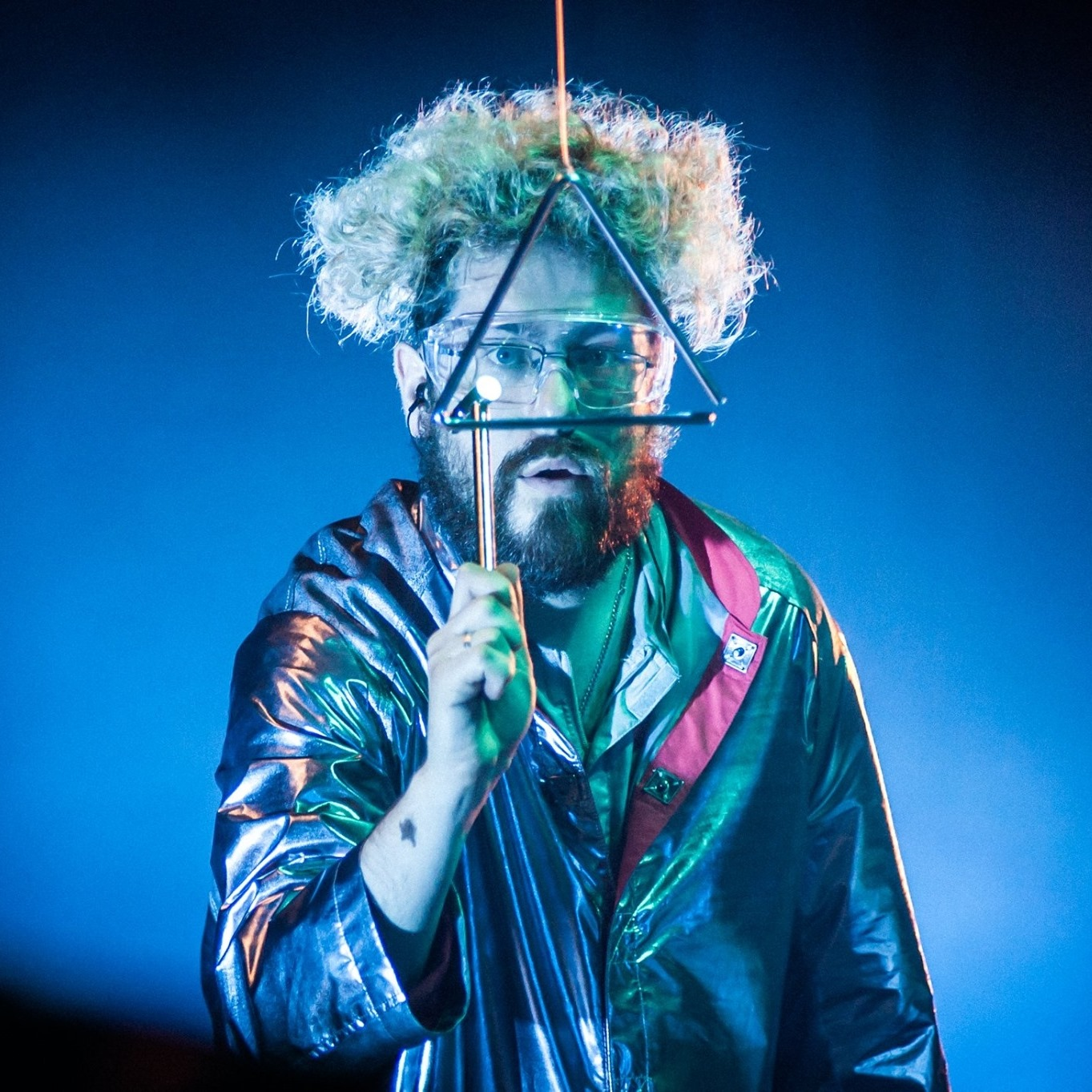
- Razumeiko in 2019
- Born: August 18, 1989 (age 36); Zaporizhzhia, Ukrainian SSR, Soviet Union
- Occupation: Composer

Illia Kostiantynovych Razumeiko (Note: Ukrainian: Ілля Костянтинович Разумейко, romanized: Illia Kostiantynovych Razumeiko) (born 18 August 1989) is a Ukrainian composer and member of Ukraine's Opera Aperta project. Born in Zaporizhzhia, many of his best-known compositions are collaborations with fellow composer Roman Hryhoriv. In 2010, Razumeiko co-founded the Porto-Franko festival with Roman Hryhoriv in Ivano-Frankivsk.

== Selected works ==
- Sviato hryzantem.
- IYOV, Job
- The Winter Garden's Tale (2018)
- Mother of Apostles (2020)
- Chornobyldorf (Roman Grygoriv, Illia Razumeiko) Ukraine 2020 Nova Opera
- "Lullaby for Mariupol" (Sung in Ukrainian)
