= Gogolfest =

International festival of contemporary art

GOGOLFEST
- Festival Logo
- Genre: theater, music, film, literature, visual art
- Dates: usually in September
- Locations: Kyiv, Ukraine
- Years active: 2007–present
- Founders: Vladislav Troitsky
- Website: gogolfest.org

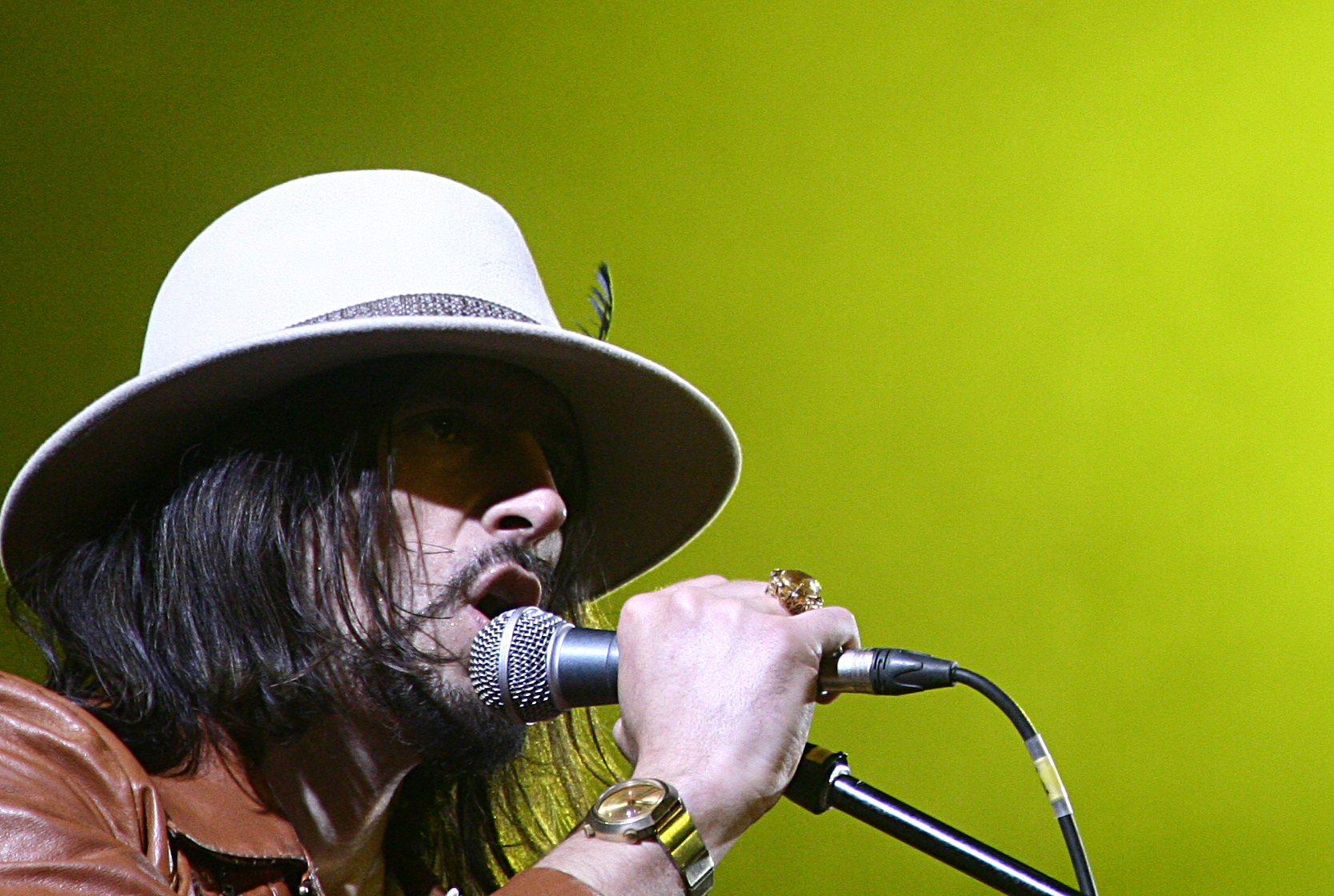
Garry Cobain of The Future Sound of London performing during GOGOLFEST-2009.

GOGOLFEST (Ukrainian: Гогольфест, stylized ГОГОЛЬFEST) is an annual multidisciplinary international festival of contemporary art and cinema in Kyiv, Ukraine, dedicated to the famous writer Mykola Gogol. The festival showcases theater, music, film, literature, and visual art.

== Background ==
GOGOLFEST was founded in 2007 on the private initiative of Vladislav Troitsky, director and producer of the DAKh Center for Contemporary Art. The co-founder of the Festival and Chairman of its Board of Trustees is Evgeni Utkin, a prominent Ukrainian IT entrepreneur. Ukrainian-Russian writer Nikolai Gogol is the festival's namesake.

In accordance with contemporary trends, the festival is held in venues unaccommodated for traditional art. The festival emphasizes five types of art: theater, music, film, literature, and visual art. There is also a history of collaboration between artistic mediums at the festival; for instance, audiovisual presentations are especially common, as well as collaborations with scientists. (For example, engineers from Lithuania's Cyland Laboratory have taken part in exhibits.) The festival is generally held in September. For example, the dates for Gogolfest 2013 were September 13 to 22, 2013.

Gogolfest often focuses on short films, though full-length films have also been featured at the festival. The films featured are often international in scope and experimental in subject matter. Previous examples of film series have included “The Long Night of German Shorts,” a selection of critically acclaimed films from Germany. Theater also has a significant place in the events of Gogolfest, as well as a role in the ongoing re-invention of Ukrainian theater. Troitskiy, in an interview, described Gogolfest as seeking to extract Ukrainian theater from the tradition of Russian theater, so it can “stand on its own.” Indeed, the festival has consistently had specially Ukrainian theater showcases. The festival is, however, committed to artistic diversity and has also produced the plays of Russian, Italian, Spanish, Swiss and Hungarian theatres. Some of the works shown at Gogolfest include “Gloria” a theatrical performance by Ukrainian director Alla Fedoryshyna, which used traditional Ukrainian folk music on the background, and depicted scenes from regular life in Ukraine: birth, marriage and death.

The festival has often included readings from contemporary authors. The festival has also included events to allow patrons access to publishing house representatives. For example, a lecture was given at Gogolfest 2013 by Ukrainian publishing house “Dukh I Litera.” “Dukh i Litera” has published more than 300 books. Most significant were editions of various foreign writers, among others Paul Riceour, Hanna Arendt, Michel de Montaigne, Blaise Pascal, Sergey Averintsev, Charles Taylor, Reinhart Koselleck, Elie Wiesel, as well as Ukrainian authors Ivan Dzyuba, Mykhaylyna Kotsyubyns’ka, Viktor Malakhov, Maryna Novikova, Myron Petrovs’kyi, Vadym Skurativs’kyi, among others.

Gogolfest has a long tradition of visual art. Indeed, the founder of the festival Vladislav Troitsky is Director and Head of the Dakh Contemporary Arts Center, one of the foremost arts exhibition organizations in Kyiv. This tradition likewise includes street art. Examples include street artist duo Roti and Kislow's mural, created explicitly for the festival.

== War and recent activity ==
Following Russia's full-scale invasion of Ukraine on 24 February 2022, GOGOLFEST suspended its in-person festival in Kyiv and shifted toward international collaborations and diaspora-based programming abroad, including in Oslo, Berlin, Hamburg, Düsseldorf, and Prague.

The festival returned to holding events inside Ukraine for the first time since the invasion in October 2024, held in Zaporizhzhia from 18–20 October 2024 under the theme "Pokrova", dedicated to Ukrainian soldiers. Due to the city's proximity to the front line, much of the programming took place in bomb shelters and reinforced buildings.

== History ==
| Date | Place | Headliners & Performers | Audience | Features |
|---|---|---|---|---|
| September 7–14, 2007 | Artistic Arsenal Complex | CCA "DAKh", "Kyiv Soloists" Chamber Ensemble | 10 000 | Establishment in Ukraine of the first annual festival of contemporary art |
| May 7–25, 2008 | Artistic Arsenal Complex | Composer V. Martynov, T. Hrindenko with "OPUS-POSTH" Ensemble, E. Gromov, Dmitry Pokrovsky Ensemble and St. Nikolsky Choir of the Tretyakov Gallery, "Volkov Trio", Alla Zagaykevych, St. Petersburg Engineering Theatre "AXE","LaboraToria", D. Ilyes Hungarian Peoples Theatre (Berehove), Studio "Sounddrama", "Kyiv Modern Ballet" | 50 000 | GOGOLFEST collaborates with other festivals, including "Sheshory", "Land of Dreams", "Youth", "Open Night", "Step", "French Spring", Koktebel Jazz Festival, "Cathedral of Song" and others. |
| September 11–27, 2009 | Artistic Arsenal Complex | Performance of Dmitry Bogomazov's "Hamlet", tours of Perm "By the Bridge" Theatre, concert "Dreams of the lost road" with DakhaBrakha, concert from the organizers of the Moloko Music Fest (Adam Green's speech, Adanovsky, Tikkle Me and Sergei Babkin), electro-acoustic program from Alla Zagaykevych, performance from St. Petersburg band NOM, and a festival-closing show from the group "Picasso's Children". | 120 000 | Two-hundredth anniversary of the birth of Gogol. For the first time, the Festival leaves the "Artistic Arsenal." |
| September 4–12, 2010 | Dovzhenko Film Studios | The opening performance took place on Kyiv's Independence Square on September 4, with "Multiverse", a joint project of Ukraine's "Dakh" Theatre and the Spanish theatre "La Fura Dels Baus", which opened the Olympic Games in Barcelona in 1992. The Festival offered a theatre programme (in addition to the Ukrainian theatre showcase), music, visual arts, literature and film programmes, as well as master classes given by invited artists. Headliner included Spanish Theatre La Fura Dels Baus, Finnish duo Kimmo Pohjonen Kluster, Italian theatre of athletic dance Kataklo, ethnic ensemble from Tuva (Russia) Huun-Huur-Tu, Russian chamber orchestra «Opus Posth.», Jazzsteppa, The Go! Team from UK. | | In May, the festival also took place in Perm. |
| September 21–29, 2012 | "Artcluster Vydubychi", 7В Inzhenerna St, Kyiv | "GOGOLMETAL", Stepan & Meduza", "TGDM", "Seahorse", "DakhaBrakha", "LABCOMBINAT", Chamber opera "Book of Songs" | | Theme: "Spetzproject Vydubychi" |
| September 13–22, 2013 | "Artcluster Vydubychi", 7В Inzhenerna St, Kyiv | "DakhaBrakha", "Dakh Daughters", "Port Mone" (Belarus), "Karbido" (Poland), Metamorphosis (Czech Republic-Austria) "Yara Arts Group", "Kolo Dzyhy", "Khlib", Hrozovakaia Band" | | Theme: "Artcluster Vydubychi". Program included an "Eco-art" program, with workshops and classes in DIY fashion, veganism, therapeutic honey use, upcycling, eco-architecture etc. |
| September 17–27, 2014 | "Artcluster Vydubychi", 7В Inzhenerna St, Kyiv | "FunФары", "Everytown", "Dallas", "5 Vymir" "Concord" ensemble, "LISFF Wiz-Art 2014" and Odesa International film festival | | Program included: "Food-Art"; a national competition for the best Ukrainian contemporary films, as well as a children's workshop in film-making. |
| September 17–27, 2015 | International Exhibition Centre, Kyiv | "InMediTerraneum (IMT)" video-art festival, Underground Art Festival, Fashion Art Festival; Music groups: "Sergey Fors", "Min+Max", "ATLAS ESTREMO", "Dreadnought", "Myopia", "Eta" | | Theme: "Art of War, Art of Love, Art of Peace" |

== Venues ==
The festival uses venues unaccommodated for traditional art. Before 2010, most of its events took place in Kyiv at the Mystetskyi Arsenal Museum - a renovated 18th-century fortified arsenal building. The event was held in the Artistic Arsenal in 2007, 2009, and 2010. The Artistic Arsenal was conceived of as the largest and most widespread exhibition venue and museum in Kyiv. This is the official website's statement on the future and expansion of the venue: “Mystetskyi Arsenal is already negotiating with the leading museums of Ukraine and the world in order to exhibit collections of art masterpieces in Ukraine, among them a big project on the heritage of Kazimir Malevich, international projects on contemporary art, exhibitions of works by Frida Kahlo, Edward Munch, Gustav Klimt, masters of the Austrian Secession, and Surrealist artists.”

In 2010, the festival moved to Dovzhenko Film Studios – named for the Ukrainian director Oleksander Dovzhenko. In 2012, 2013 and 2014, the venue was at the "Artcluster Vydubychi",(formerly the Kyiv Experimental Mechanical Plant), in the Vydubychi industrial area, near the Vydubychi Metro in Kyiv.

== GOGOLFEST Inoculation ==
In 2018, the GOGOLFEST inoculation project appeared. According to Vlad Troitskyi, the project is designed to "illuminate" the culture of cities, the environment of which usually nothing is known.

Also, the festival sees itself as a platform on which a dialogue between local authorities and activists is established.

In 2019, the organizers of the festival together with Ukrzaliznytsia launched the GOGOL Train, the first art train in Ukraine on the Kyiv-Mariupol route. The carriages were decorated by artists especially for this trip. The train had several special carriages where, on the way to StartUp GOGOLFEST, parties, musical performances and presentations took place. Also, the GOGOL Train project was implemented before the Dream GOGOLFEST in September 2020 on the route Kyiv-Kherson-Kyiv.

In 2020, the quarantine limited the possibilities for holding festivals, although GOGOLFEST was announced in nine cities of Ukraine.
