= Nikolai Dzhumagaliev =

Soviet serial killer

- Николай Жұмағалиев
- Dzhumagaliev in 1980
- Born: Nikolai Espolovich Dzhumagaliev; 15 November 1952 (age 73); Uzynagash, Kazakh SSR, Soviet Union
- Other names: Железный Клык ("Metal Fang"), Kolya the Maneater, the Almaty Cannibal, Dzhuma, Satan
- Convictions: Negligent homicide, criminal possession of a weapon (1979); Murder (2014)
- Penalty: Compulsory treatment

Details
- Victims: 10+
- Date: 1979–1980; 1989–1990
- Country: Soviet Union
- States: Alma-Ata Region, Aktyubinsk
- Date apprehended: 19 December 1980 (first time); 1991 (second time)

Nikolai Espolūly Jumağaliev (Kazakh: Николай Есполұлы Жұмағалиев, Russified as Dzhumagaliev, Russian: Николай Есполович Джумагалиев; born 15 November 1952) is a Soviet serial killer and cannibal who killed ten people in the Kazakh SSR (now Kazakhstan) between 1979 and 1990. He was nicknamed "Metal Fang" due to his dental crowns.

Between 1979 and 1980, Dzhumagaliev killed and cannibalized eight women, having also served a brief prison sentence for the accidental killing of a male co-worker during this time. He was institutionalized in 1980, but escaped custody in 1988. Dzhumagaliev remained a fugitive for two years committing at least one additional murder while on the run before his recapture in 1991.

== Background ==
Dzhumagaliev was born in Uzynagash, Kazakh SSR, the third of four children to a Kazakh father and Belarusian mother, both of whom worked on a collective farm. His birthdate is most commonly reported as 15 November, though it is sometimes reported as 1 January. Dzhumagaliev grew up with three sisters, one of whom disappeared during his childhood.

In school, Dzhumagaliev was a below average student, but otherwise well-behaved. In his teenage years, he had several sexual encounters with female schoolmates, but eventually had to stop after contracting a sexually transmitted infection.

After completing the ninth grade, Dzhumagaliev studied at a railway school. He was assigned to work in Guryev, where he was conscripted into the Soviet Army, serving in the chemical defence force. He was stationed in Samarkand, Uzbek SSR, and in Otar, near his hometown. After being demobilized, Dzhumagaliev tried to get a driver's licence and enroll in the geology department of Kazakh Agricultural Institute in Almaty, but failed to achieve either goal. For a few years, he travelled across the Soviet Union as a migrant worker, usually staying between the Ural Mountains and Siberia, where he found occasional employment as a sailor, a freight forwarder, an electrician, and a bulldozer operator. In 1977, after spending some time in Murmansk and Magadan, Dzhumagaliev returned to Uzynagash, living on 12 Chapayev Street and taking a job as a firefighter.

== Murders ==
=== Motive ===
During questioning immediately after his arrest, Dzhumagaliev explained his motive by saying "I sided with the animals. I did to people what they do to animals". In his diary, authored between 1979 and 1980, Dzhumagaliev stated that he was mainly motivated by sexual desire, particularly his "irresistible attraction to the female body", writing that by eating the corpses of women, he believed that he would "know it completely and entirely". He also professed a hatred for women, whom he viewed as inferior to men and called their murder a form of vengeance for "violating the laws of nature". Dzhumagaliev also claimed to have been inspired by a book called Black Fog (Черный туман), which contained accounts of "ancient Germanic women drinking blood to foretell prophecies", in reference to the Cimbrian seeresses, writing that by doing the same with the blood of his murder victims, he had been able to see his own future from 1980 to 1988. According to Dzhumagaliev, he planned two of the murders to take place on the death anniversary of his grandmother and the 100th birthday of his grandfather for similar reasons. Later research suggested that Dzhumagaliev misogyny was due to him contracting a STI, as well as romantic rejection by a woman he was interested in during his travels across the USSR.

During Dzhumagaliev 1979 negligent homicide trial, Grigory Ilyich Zaltsman diagnosed Dzhumagaliev with schizophrenia, which was affirmed by the Serbsky Center. During his 1980 murder trial, psychiatrist Marx Khaimovich Gonopolsky saw several signs for psychopathy in Dzhumagaliev, but also considered it possible that he was sane, with both suggestions being rejected by the Serbsky Center, who maintained that Dzhumagaliev was schizophrenic.

=== 1979–1980 murders ===
Through 1979, Dzhumagaliev killed six women. The earliest murder took place on the night on 6 January 1979, when Dzhumagaliev spotted Natalya Andronnik near the Uzynagach–Maybulak highway, walking home alone from a Seventh-day Adventist service. Dzhumagaliev ambushed Andronnik, stabbing her several times in the chest before dragging her to a landfill of the Kargalinsky clothing factory near Fabrichny. He killed her by slitting her throat and after drinking Andronnik's blood from the wound Dzhumagaliev dismembered her, also cutting off her breasts, calves, and some fatty tissue, which he carried back home in a backpack. Her torso and arms were partially buried under debris while her head and legs were left in the open. Andronnik's remains were discovered on 20 January by local residents. A forensic examination determining that some of her flesh had been removed, leading police to believe that Natalya Andronnik was cannibalized. A criminal case was opened on 22 January, but a manhunt, which included several sting operations to lure out the perpetrator, was unsuccessful. Residents remained shaken by the murder, with most men arming themselves with axes and other tools and accompanying female relatives when they went outside.

On 21 April 1979, Dzhumagaliev killed L. F. Krieger. She was reported missing, but her body never found. On 21 June 1979, Dzhumagaliev broke into a home outside of Almaty, killing L. I. Lavrishcheva and mortally wounding her adult daughter V. P. Aksenova by slitting their throats as they slept. The granddaughter was able to hide in a closet during the attack and saw Dzhumagaliev remove some of their flesh before leaving, though she could not describe his face to police due to darkness. Less than a week later, Dzhumagaliev heard one of his girlfriends complain about a friend, M. Volkova, who had allegedly stolen something from her. He asked her to invite Volkova over so he could talk with her, and during the meeting on 27 June, Dzhumagaliev strangled Volkova before slitting her throat to drink her blood. By summer of 1979, Dzhumagaliev had started curing some of the human flesh in a barrel in his home.

On 21 August 1979, Dzhumagaliev invited some friends to his home, discussing their shared interest in hunting while drinking vodka. Dzhumagaliev presented his guests with a single-shot hunting rifle, inherited from his grandfather, and at the suggestion of his guests, the group went outside to see Dzhumagaliev shoot a pigeon on the television antenna. Due to his drunken state, Dzhumagaliev missed his target and while reloading the rifle, Dzhumagaliev tripped and accidentally discharged the rifle, fatally shooting his fellow firefighter Aleksandr Sh. While his friends and some local police officers were symphatic to Dzhumagaliev and attributed the killing to bad luck, the Zhambyl District court convicted Dzhumagaliev of negligent homicide and illegal possession of firearms on 15 November of the same year, sentencing him to 4½ years imprisonment. Dzhumagaliev first served his sentence at a correctional facility in Zarechny (Moinak since 2006), before being transferred to a penal colony outside of Fabrichny. As he was a model prisoner, the penal colony allowed Dzhumagaliev to take weekend furloughs to his home in Uzynagash. Dzhumagaliev was released early for good behaviour in late 1980, after serving just over a year of his sentence.

On 8 November 1980, while working at a construction site near Burundai, Dzhumagaliev murdered T. A. Gladkikh. On 13 December 1980, shortly after his release, Dzhumagaliev killed Valya Manukhina during a home invasion. She was stabbed eighteen times while sleeping next to her newborn and during the murder, Dzhumagaliev also injured Manukhina's mother-in-law with a stab wound to the chest.

On 18 December 1980, Dzhumagaliev held a party at his home with several friends, spending the night drinking alcohol and eating dumplings. According to a 2017 interview by Caravan newspaper with one of the guests, in the early morning hours of 19 December, Dzhumagaliev went to the bedroom with one of their female friends, Tatiana R., only to emerge sometime later covered in blood and asking the other guests if they knew what they had eaten. While the guests believed they had eaten pork, Dzhumagaliev showed them the severed head of a woman, causing everyone in attendance to vomit and flee the house.

The interviewed witness stated that he called Uzynagash District Police, telling the operator of two apparent murders committed by Dzhumagaliev. Although the officer disbelieved the caller due to Dzhumagaliev's reputation, he forwarded the call to his superiors, leading the deputy chief and three officers to Dzhumagaliev's address. Inside, the responding officers found Dzhumagaliev naked and in the process of disembowelling the body of Tatiana R. with a knife. While the officers were distracted, Dzhumagaliev ran out of the house carrying a compass, a hunting knife and a hatchet. Dzhumagaliev was located the following day on 20 December, hiding in the basement of a local elderly woman, who was a distant relative of his.

Dzhumagaliev confessed to eight murders, not counting the killing of Aleksandr Sh., giving police his diary as proof, detailing how he had eaten the flesh and organs of his victims as pelmeni and salo. He told officers that he showed the severed head to his friends to see their shocked reactions believing they had consumed human flesh, maintaining that he had consumed the meat by himself. His murder trial took place on 3 December 1981 at the Alma-Ata Regional Court. In order to discourage potential violence by the victims' relatives, the area surrounding the court was cordoned off and guarded by three rows of machine gunners. Due to his schizophrenia diagnosis, the presiding judge issued an order for involuntary commitment to a special mental hospital in Tashkent, Uzbek SSR.

Shortly after Dzhumagaliev's 1980 crimes had gained wide attention, another serial killer, Alexander Skrynnik, was operating in Chișinău. He killed women and dismembered their bodies, after which he brought the body parts to his friend. The head of one of Skrynnik's victims was shown on television. In Chișinău, rumours spread that Dzhumagaliev had escaped and reached the Moldovan capital. The rumours were put to rest when Skrynnik was convicted of the crimes, sentenced to death, and executed.

=== First confinement, escape, and fugitive years ===
Dzhumagaliev spent eight years in psychiatric holding. As his condition appeared to improve during treatment, a transfer to an ordinary mental hospital was approved. During the transport on 29 August 1989, Dzhumagaliev escaped custody by breaking down a wall during a bathroom break. His whereabouts during this time are unknown, but it's suspected that Dzhumagaliev continued his murders in the two years he was a fugitive. One murder was confirmed to have taken place in 1990 while in Aktobe, when he was caught leaving the house of a woman with blood on his face. A neighbour spotted and shouted at Dzhumagaliev, who distracted the man by threatening to shoot him before running away.

At one point, Dzhumagaliev had an acquaintance in Moscow write a letter to a friend in Frunze, Kirghiz SSR. The letter was signed with his last name and ended with the words: "...I'll be back, but not very soon. There are a lot of beautiful women here. One or two will disappear, and no one will even notice". While his location was thus believed to be in Moscow, Dzhumagaliev returned to the region of Kazakhstan. The population of Moscow was alarmed by a small item in the Kuranty newspaper, which said that Dzhumagaliev was seen in the city and surrounding region. Russian authorities subsequently denied that Dzhumagaliev had been in Moscow during his escape.

For several years, he was reported to be seen around Moscow, Kyrgyzstan, and Uzbekistan. Dzhumagaliev claimed to have spent most of his time in hiding in mountains of Central Asia, saying he traded plants as herbal medicine to locals in exchange for food. He also claimed that the same herbs "allowed him to overcome his psychiatric diagnosis and become a normal person". With each passing day, it became harder for him to hide, as hang-gliders pestered him constantly and motor vehicles were also engaged in the search.

According to Yury Dubyagin, a Colonel in the Ministry of Internal Affairs, he suspected Dzhumagaliev killed some victims attributed to Ukrainian serial killer Anatoliy Tymofeev in Moscow. He claimed that a victim who survived an attack at Dinamo metro station and a witness to the scene had been dismissed from the case after stating that the attacker wasn't Tymofeev, with Dubyagin himself being penalized on orders of the Ministry of Internal Affairs for spreading disinformation.

In April 1991, during the dissolution of the Soviet Union, Dzhumagaliev was arrested for sheep theft in Fergana Region, Uzbekistan. He had planned for his arrest in hopes of hiding within the prison system. Upon being brought to Tashkent Pretrial Detention Center No. 1, Dzhumagaliev claimed to be Chinese, hoping that this would enable him to receive new identity documents upon his release. Accordingly, was placed in the general cell of the SIZO. During interrogations, he willingly confessed to the theft, but could not explain how he had made his way to the Soviet Union. Because of this discrepancy, a request was sent to Moscow for assistance. Colonel Yury Dubyagin, who had participated in the effort to capture Dzhumagaliev, arrived in Fergana from the capital. Dzhumagaliev was positively identified and returned to Kazakhstan, where he was committed to a psychiatric facility in Nikolaevka.

== Current confinement ==
In September 2014, Dzhumagaliev was charged with and convicted of the tenth murder committed in 1990 in Aktobe. As of 2025, Dzhumagaliev is incarcerated in a specialized psychiatric clinic in Aktas.

At the clinic, Dzhumagaliev is engaged in the repair of small equipment. He said that he hoped that the court would accept evidence of his recovery and release him in the future. Previously, he was recognized as cured and released, and immediately dismembered bodies were found in the vicinity. He once filed an application to be given the death penalty, but it was regarded by experts as a symptom of the deterioration of his condition. Doctors say about him: "His behavior is orderly; the patient is calm. He willingly works in the department, helping the staff. We have no grounds to believe that he poses a danger to others. He can quietly be in society and be observed in a regular hospital." The question of his discharge is still open. Specialists studying serial killers strongly disagree with the conclusions of the clinic's doctors.

In January 2016, there were rumours in WhatsApp and Facebook about his possible escape, being subsequently blamed for the disappearance of 22-year-old Saida Akzhanova. However, this was never confirmed. The police tracked down the author of the false report, who turned out to be a 21-year-old female resident from Dzhumagaliev's native village. She was subsequently arrested and confessed.

Russian lawyer Yuri Antonyan, ruminating on the psychology and sexual frustration of serial killers, stated that Dzhumagaliev "was disgusted by sexual intercourse".

== In popular culture ==
- The song "Metal Fang" by Norwegian thrash metal band Blood Tsunami is about Dzhumagaliev.
- Dzhumagaliev's case is explored in the Russian documentary film "Satan" (2008) from the series The investigation led by ...

== See also ==
- List of Soviet serial killers
- List of incidents of cannibalism

== Literature ==
- Yuri Antonyan, Vereshchagin V. A., Potapov S. A., Shostakovich B. V.: Serial sexual murder. Tutorial / ed. Yu. M. Antonyan. M.: MUI Ministry of Internal Affairs of Russia, Publishing House "Shield-M", 1997. 202 p. Archived on 13 February 2017.
- Yuri Antonyan, Violent crime in Russia / Ed. Ed.: L. L. Ananian; Ch. Ed.: N. N. Kondrashkov. M.: INION RAS, 2001. 104 p. (Actual issues of the fight against crime in Russia and abroad).
