= Degeres =

Village in Almaty Region, Kazakhstan

Coordinates: 43°14′15″N 75°48′15″E

Degeres (Kazakh: Дегерес, Degeres) is a village located in Zhambyl District, Almaty Region, Kazakhstan.

== History ==
The village was founded around 1918. There used to be a famous stud farm of the noble horse breeds. During the Great Patriotic War in 1942, 6000 horses were sent to the frontiere from this farm. By the decision of the Presidium of the Almaty regional executive committee on November 5, 1994 the village was named Degeres.

== Geographical location ==
The village is located 60 kilometers to the west of the administrative center of Zhambyl District - Uzynagash village.

== Population ==
In 1999 the population of the village was 1486 people (757 men and 729 women). According to the population census of 2009 there were 1559 people (806 men and 753 women) in the village. According to the census of 2016 the population of the village was 1785 people
