= X Factor (Kazakhstani TV series) =

- Also known as: X Factor Kazakhstan
- Created by: Simon Cowell
- Directed by: Lev Mariupolskiy
- Presented by: Adil Liyan; Arnur Istybaev; Daniyar Dzhumadilov
- Judges: Nagima Eskalieva; Sultana Karazhigitova; Alexander Shevchenko; Ismail Igilmanov; Erlan Kokeev; Dilnaz Akhmadieva; Nurbergen Makhambetov; Eva Becher; Anatoliy Tsoy
- Country of origin: Kazakhstan
- No. of seasons: 10

Production
- Producers: Art Centre Pro, Fremantle, Syco
- Running time: 60-75 mins (inc. adverts)

Original release
- Network: Perviy Kanal Evraziya (1-3 season); KTK (4 season); Perviy Kanal Evraziya (5–)
- Release: 23 January 2011 – present

X Factor is a television music talent show in Kazakhstan contested by aspiring pop singers drawn from public auditions. It is the Kazakh version of the international The X Factor series and is broadcast on the Perviy Kanal Evraziya channel in Kazakhstan.

== Judges' categories and their contestants ==
In each season, each judge is allocated a category to mentor and chooses three acts to progress to the live shows. This table shows, for each season, which category each judge was allocated and which acts he or she put through to the live shows.

Key:

– Winning judge/category. Winners are in bold, eliminated contestants in small font.

Season	Alexander Shevchenko	Nagima Eskalieva	Sultana Karazhigitova
One	**16-24s** **Daria Gabdull**; Ruslan Krivenkov; Abdulkarim Karimov; Daria Akparova; Ruslan Berdimatov	**Over 25s** Asel Karsybaeva; Yuri Mukhortov; Eldar Myrzahanov; Margarita Tumanyan; Gulzhiyan Ospanova	**Groups**; Spasibo; National; Musaev Sisters; Dee Kree; Astana
	Alexander Shevchenko	Nagima Eskalieva	Sultana Karazhigitova / Ismail Igilmanov
Two	**Over 25s** Ainura Eshmanova; Timur Imandzhanov; Alina Bektasova	**16-24s** **Andrei Tikhonov**; Sanda; Erken Kenebaev	**Groups**; Mezzo; W-YOU; Brilliants
	Alexander Shevchenko	Nagima Eskalieva	Erlan Kokeev
Three	**Over 25s** **Evgeniya Barysheva**; Baibulat Sandybekov; Ruslana Ponomaryova	**16-24s** Arman Kamerdinov; Rustem Zhugunusov; Alisa Muratova	**Groups**; Impulse Band; Cappuccino; Bounty
	Alexander Shevchenko	Nagima Eskalieva	Dilnaz Akhmadieva
Four	**Groups**; Head Made; II Boys; Vkyrazhe	**Over 25s** **Kairat Kapanov**; Tatyana Kim; Bagdat Baimanov	**16-24s** Alexandra Samarina; Alyona Balashova; Victor Fedyanin
	Alexander Shevchenko	Nagima Eskalieva	Dilnaz Akhmadieva / Nurbergen Makhambetov
Five	**Over 25s** Diana Khashimkhanova; Alexander Skornyakov; Vladimir Ligai	**16-24s** **Evgeniy Vyblov**; Oxana Ustina; Daniyar Zhulbarisov; Ruslan Dzhailbaev	**Groups**; Z VidMen; Gaukhartas
	Eva Becher	Nagima Eskalieva	Nurbergen Makhambetov
Six	**Over 25s** Aru Ayezova; Andrey Zaretsky; Bauyrzhan Zhakypbek	**Groups**; Alan; Heart Beat; A'Cappella Apriori	**16-24s** **Astana Kargabay**; Vladimir Novikov; Aidana Riza
	Dilnaz Akhmadieva	Nagima Eskalieva	Nurbergen Makhambetov
Seven	**16-24s** **Dilnura Birzhanova**; Elaman Ayaganov; Adilkhan Makin	**Groups**; In Coro; VCourse; Twice	**Over 25s** Jansultan Zhumagaliyev; Erlan Baibazarov; Aynur Abdieva
	Anatoliy Tsoy	Nagima Eskalieva	Nurbergen Makhambetov
Eight	**Groups**; **Bro**; DBS; Reevoice	**16-24s** Asil Jomartov; Merimxan Nazarxanov; Asel Kutban	**Over 25s** Rustam Elyas; Laura Uteuova; Baktygul Ongarova
	Dilnaz Akhmadieva	Eva Becher	Nurbergen Makhambetov
Nine	**Groups**; BTB; Jam; One Day	**Over 25s** Merkhat Kanapyanov; Koblandi-Batir Sokan; Ayawlim Matikova; Diana Bekmurzaeva	**16-24s** **Miras Erbolov**; Andrey Sergeev; Akbota Sabirzhanova; Maxambetali Abilda
	Dilnaz Akhmadieva	Eva Becher	Nurbergen Makhambetov
Ten	**Ulpan Zumabek**; Maral Mukhtarov; Sulu Kubeysin	MD; Indira Aitbergen; Kalzhan Temirbaev	Gulistan Ahmerova; Elite; Asem Ryspaeva

== Season summary ==
"Sultana Karazhigitova" category
"Alexander Shevchenko" category
"Nagima Eskalieva" category
"Ismail Igilmanov" category
"Erlan Kokeev" category
"Dilnaz Akhmadieva" category
"Nurbergen Makhambetov" category
"Eva Becher" category
"Anatoliy Tsoy" category

Season	Air date	Winner	Runner-up	Third place	Host(s)	Judges	Winning mentor
One	23 January 2011 – 23 May 2011	Daria Gabdull	Spasibo	Asel Karsybaeva	Adil Liyan	Nagima Eskalieva; Sultana Karazhigitova; Alexander Shevchenko	Alexander Shevchenko
Two	14 January 2012 – 19 May 2012	Andrey Tikhonov	Mezzo	Sanda	Arnur Istybaev	Nagima Eskalieva; Sultana Karazhigitova / Ismail Igilmanov; Alexander Shevchenko	Nagima Eskalieva
Three	12 January 2013 – 18 May 2013	Evgeniya Barysheva	Arman Kamerdinov	Baibulat Sandybekov	Arnur Istybaev	Nagima Eskalieva; Alexander Shevchenko; Erlan Kokeev	Alexander Shevchenko
Four	14 September 2013 - 7 December 2013	Kairat Kapanov	Alexandra Samarina	Tatyana Kim	Arnur Istybaev	Nagima Eskalieva; Alexander Shevchenko; Dilnaz Akhmadieva	Nagima Eskalieva
Five	6 September 2014 - 13 December 2014	Evgeniy Vyblov	Z	Oxana Ustina	Arnur Istybaev	Nagima Eskalieva; Dilnaz Akhmadieva / Nurbergen Makhambetov; Alexander Shevchenko	Nagima Eskalieva
Six	5 September 2015 - 26 December 2015	Astana Kargabay	Aru Auezova	Vladimir Novikov	Arnur Istybaev	Nagima Eskalieva; Eva Becher; Nurbergen Makhambetov	Nurbergen Makhambetov
Seven	1 September 2018 - 30 December 2018	Dilnura Birzhanova	In Coro	Elaman Ayaganov	Daniyar Dzhumadilov	Nagima Eskalieva; Dilnaz Akhmadieva; Nurbergen Makhambetov	Dilnaz Akhmadieva
Eight	24 October 2020 - 20 February 2021	Bro	Asil Jomartov	Rustam Elyas	Daniyar Dzhumadilov	Nagima Eskalieva; Anatoliy Tsoy; Nurbergen Makhambetov	Anatoliy Tsoy
Nine	29 October 2022 - 18 February 2023	Miras Erbolov	Andrey Sergeev	Merkhat Kanapyanov		Dilnaz Akhmadieva; Eva Becher; Nurbergen Makhambetov	Nurbergen Makhambetov
Ten	28 October 2023 - 10 February 2024	Ulpan Zumabek	MD	Gulistan Ahmerova		Dilnaz Akhmadieva; Eva Becher; Nurbergen Makhambetov	Dilnaz Akhmadieva

== Season 1 (2011) ==
The first season was aired from January to May 2011 with Nagima Eskalieva, Sultana Karazhigitova and Alexander Shevchenko as judges. On 22 May, Daria Gabdull (Дәрия Ғабдұлл), labeled by the judges as the "Kazakh Beyoncé, won the show ahead of the trio Spasibo. Gabdulla won a two-years-contract with Sony Music.

== Season 2 (2012) ==
The second season was aired from January to May 2012 with Nagima Eskalieva, Sultana Karazhigitova/Ismail Igilmanov and Alexander Shevchenko as judges. On 5 May, Andrei Tikhonov (Андрей Тихонов) won the show ahead of the quartet Mezzo. Andrey won a two-years-contract with Sony Music.

== Season 3 (Winter/Spring 2013) ==
The third season was aired from January to May 2013 with Nagima Eskalieva, Erlan Kokeev and Alexander Shevchenko as judges. On 4 May, Evgenia Barysheva (Евгения Барышева) won the show ahead of the Arman Kamerdinov (Арман Камердинов).

== Season 4 (Fall 2013) ==
The fourth season was aired from 14 September to 7 December 2013 with Nagima Eskalieva, Dilnaz Akhmadieva and Alexander Shevchenko as judges. On 7 December, Kairat Kapanov (Кайрат Капанов) won the show ahead of the Alexandra Samarina (Александра Самарина)

== Season 5 (2014) ==
The fifth season was aired from 6 September to 27 December 2014 with Nagima Eskalieva, Dilnaz Akhmadieva/Nurbergen Makhambetov and Alexander Shevchenko as judges.

== Season 6 (2015) ==
The sixth season was aired from 5 September to 26 December 2015 with Nagima Eskalieva, Nurbergen Makhambetov and Eva Becher as judges.

== Season 7 (2018) ==
The seventh season was aired from 1 September to 30 December 2018 with Nagima Eskalieva, Dilnaz Akhmadieva and Nurbergen Makhambetov as judges.

== Season 8 (2020-21) ==
The eighth season was aired from 24 October 2020 to 20 February 2021 with Nagima Eskalieva, Anatoliy Tsoy and Nurbergen Makhambetov as judges.

== Season 9 (2022-23) ==
The ninth season was aired from 29 October 2022 to 18 February 2023 with Dilnaz Akhmadieva, Eva Becher and Nurbergen Makhambetov as judges.

== Season 10 (2023-24) ==
The tenth season was aired from 28 October 2023 with Dilnaz Akhmadieva, Eva Becher and Nurbergen Makhambetov as judges.

== See also ==
- SuperStar KZ
