= Nagima Eskalieva =

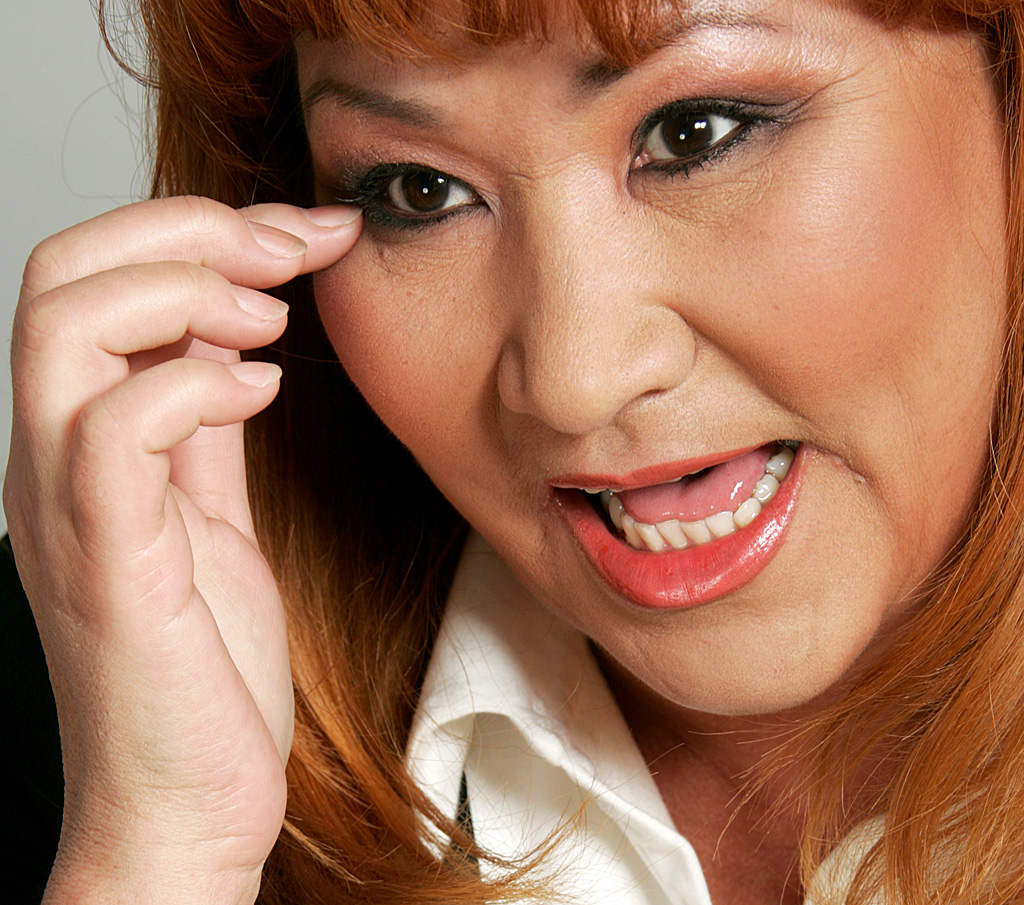

Background information
- Born: Nagima Kabulkyzy Eskalieva; February 3, 1954 (age 72); Fabrichnyy, Almaty Region, Kazakhstan
- Genres: Kazakh pop, Kazakh folk
- Occupations: Singer, actress
- Years active: 1979–present

Nagima Eskalieva (Kazakh: Нағима Қабылқызы Есқалиева, Nağima Qabylqyzy Esqalieva; born February 3, 1954, in Fabrichnyy, Zhambyl District, Almaty Region) is a Kazakh singer and awarded national artist of the Kazakh Soviet Socialist Republic.

== Early life ==
Eskalieva was born in an industrial area to Habdul Eskaliev and his wife Visilia, who were both workers in the region. She was the oldest of five children and grew up under basic conditions. She has three sisters and one brother.

== Career ==
After graduating in the Republican School of Variety and Circus Arts (the vocal class of L.Kesoglu) and Alma-Ata Musical School (Department of Choral Conducting, Eskalieva became an ensemble member of the famous Gulder (Гүлдер) formation. She first rose to popularity when she participated on the soviet Singing Competition With Song through Life (С песней по жизни) in 1979, which she won. After that she went on to become one of the most well-known singers of Kazakhstan and was touring through the entire Soviet Union. She eventually moved to Moscow and from then on also went on tour in Algeria, Cuba, Czechoslovakia, Denmark and the German Democratic Republic. In 1984, she went on winning the Golden Orpheus Festival in Sofia. Eskalievas range goes from Kazakh Folk Songs to modern compositions. In 2008, she recorded a charity Single with the boygroup Percy to support children suffering of Cardiac disease. First planning on becoming an actress, she occasionally appeared in front of the film camera.
Throughout the years, Eskalieva has been supportive of aspiring singers in her home country. In 1996, she founded a Music Atelier aiming to find and support young singing talent in Kazakhstan. She was a jury member in SuperStar KZ 3 & 4, the Kazakh version of Pop Idol as well as on X Factor, where she was the winning mentor in the second season held in 2012 with her contestant Andrey Tikhonov. Currently she is teaching at the Academy of Vocal Arts Zhurgenev.

== Personal life ==
Eskalieva was married two times and has a son named Aleksander (born 1983), who auditioned when she was leading the jury of SuperStar KZ.

== Discography ==
- 2004: Nashi 3 singing Молва
- 2006: Мой HiT #3 (My HiT #3) singing Прости (Simple)
- 2008: Мама (Mother) feat. Percy (Перцы)

== Filmography ==
- 1982: Родные степи
- 1983: Искупи вину
- 2009: Kairat Champion. Virgin No. 1 (Кайрат-чемпион. Девственник №1)

== Awards ==
- 1979: Grand prix of USSR National TV Song Contest "С песней по жизни"
- 1984: Lenin Komsomol Prize
- 1984: Golden Orpheus Festival
- National artist of the Kazakh Soviet Socialist Republic
