= Skrynnik (disambiguation) =

Skrynnik may refer to:

- Alexander Skrynnik (1953–1981), Moldovan serial killer
- Yelena Skrynnik (born 1961), minister of agriculture of Russian Federation in 2009–2012
- Boris Skrynnik (1948–2025), Russian bandy executive and former athlete
