= Mynbayevo =

- Village
- Location in Kazakhstan
- Coordinates: 43°17′35″N 76°26′40″E
- Country: Kazakhstan
- Region: Almaty Region
- District: Zhambyl District
- Time zone: UTC+6 (Omsk Time)

Mynbayevo (Kazakh: Мыңбаев, Myñbaev), is a village in Zhambyl District of Almaty Region, in south-eastern Kazakhstan.
