= Akkainar and Zhartas petroglyphs =

Petroglyphs in Kazakhstan

- Аққайнар және Тартас петроглифтері (Kazakh)
- Interactive map of Akkainar and Zhartas petroglyphs
- Location: Almaty Region, Kazakhstan

Site notes
- Area: Zhambyl district

The Akkainar and Zhartas petroglyphs are located in the Akkainar River valley in Zhambyl District, Almaty Region, Kazakhstan.

== History ==
Petroglyphs in the lower reaches of the Akkainar river valley were identified in 2001 by B. J. Abubekerov and R. Sala. Later, they were studied by A. E. Rogozhinsky, A. N. Maryashev, L. Hermann and the Laboratory of Geoarchaeology (R.Sala and J.-M.Deom) 2021-2024.[3]

== Description ==
Petroglyphs from different eras and burial grounds have been found along the mountain valley of the Akkainar River and its tributaries, as well as in the adjacent Zhartas area to the west. Together, they form a complex of archaeological monuments. More than 40 monuments (settlements, burial grounds, and clusters of petroglyphs) have been studied and registered, including about 30 rock images of tamga of medieval nomads and Kazakhs and 10 epigraphic texts written in Oirat, Tibetan script (from the first half of the eighteenth century) and in Chagatai (from the nineteenth to early twentieth century).

A significant part of the territory of the complex is on a military training ground with restricted access. Monuments along the lower reaches of the Akkainar River are located near the highway between Matybulak and Tambaly-tas and are publicly accessible. These monuments near the highway include three rock outcrops on the left bank of the Akkainar River and a Bronze Age burial ground on a terrace on the opposite bank.

Petroglyphs include a small series of drawings from the Bronze Age and early Iron Age, as well as five rock prayer inscriptions made in Tibetan and Oirat script from the late seventeenth to mid-eighteenth century. Near one of the Kazakh winter camps there are four similar signs depicting tamga of the Dulat tribe of the Elder Zhuz. Among the objects available for inspection, a small sanctuary near a spring flowing from the South into the Akkainar River is of interest.

On the vertical, south-facing sides of three rocks beside a small river, two anthropomorphic figures from the Bronze Age are carved, and between them are two lines of inscription. The top line contains the Tibetan prayer formula "Om-mA-Ni pad – me hum", the second line contains the same in Oirat script. Both lines were from the same time, probably not earlier than the second half of the seventeenth to the first half of the eighteenth century. To the left of the inscriptions are two similar anthropomorphic images with heights of 18 and 20 cm. A crescent-shaped halo is shown above the head of each character, the figure on the right is updated, and the left is an incomplete image. The patina of both engravings is darker than the patina of the inscriptions, which indicates greater antiquity of the drawings. To the right of the inscriptions, there are two more similar anthropomorphic characters, one of which is an incomplete image, and the second has a restoration of the same color as the character on the first plane. The heights of the figures are 23 and 29 cm, respectively. On the next rock to the east, there are two more compositions of Bronze Age petroglyphs (hunting scenes, bull figures) and two Tibetan prayer inscriptions that are related to the Buddhist sanctuary of the Oirats, who adapted images of the "sun heads" of the bronze age to the Lamaists. Fifty meters to the west on a separate rock ledge there are medieval tamga and a large portrait of Lenin with the inscription "100 zhyl". The third rock to the east is notable for images of four tamga of Kazakhs of the Dulat tribe of the Elder Zhuz, whose winter quarters in this area were the border nomads of the Botpaev (Anrakhay) parish at the end of the nineteenth century. The bronze age burial ground opposite the parking lot consists of stone fences with boxes in the center and low mounds; excavations of the monument indicate it belongs to the Begazy–Dandybai culture.

== Location ==
The Akkainar River valley and the small Zhartas Mountains are located at the southern end of the Chu-ili watershed. The complexity of accessible monuments is located 10 km northeast of the village of Matybulak, 2 km to the West of Hanbalites (Gorny village) and north of the Otar-Gorny highway in the Zhambyl district of Almaty region.

== Preservation ==
The monuments are under state protection but are not included in the state list of historical and cultural monuments. There is no physical protection of the monuments in place. Along the rocks on the left bank of the Akkainar River runs a cattle track.
