= Akkaynar =

Akkaynar Аққайнар
- Village
- Location in Kazakhstan
- Coordinates: 43°10′0″N 76°2′22″E
- Country: Kazakhstan
- Region: Almaty Region
- District: Zhambyl District

Population (2009)
  - Total: 2,754
- Time zone: UTC+6 (Omsk Time)
- Postal code: 040602
- Area code: 72770

Akkaynar (Kazakh: Аққайнар, Aqqainar), formerly Prudki, is an agricultural village in Almaty Region of south-eastern Kazakhstan. It is located approximately 40 kilometres west of Kaskelen, not far from the border with Kyrgyzstan. There are petroglyphs in the lower parts of the namesake river valley, discovered in 2001 C.E. by J. Abubekerov and R. Sala.

== Population density ==
year	Population density
1999	1916
2009	2754

== Climate ==
The climate is moderately continental with warm summers and moderately cold winters. The warmest month of the year is July (March), the coldest is January (February).
