= Lukyanivska Prison =

Historic prison in Kyiv

Coordinates: 50°27′43.92″N 30°28′1.58″E

Lukianivska Prison (Ukrainian: Лук'янівська в'язниця, romanized: Lukianivka viaznytsia) is a famous historical prison in the Ukrainian capital Kyiv, located in the central Lukianivka neighborhood of the city. It is officially known as SIZO#13 (Ukrainian: Слідчий ізолятор№13, Slidchyi izoliator #13) which is a portmanteau for Slidchyi IZOliator (Ukrainian: слідчий ізолятор).

Though the facility is now functioning as a pre-conviction detention center, it is still colloquially called a "prison". The compound now includes minor examples of the historical architecture. The prison is infamous for its poor condition. Since late February 2016 the complex is on sale; its buyer has to build a new detention facility outside Kyiv in exchange for the territory of Lukyanivska Prison.

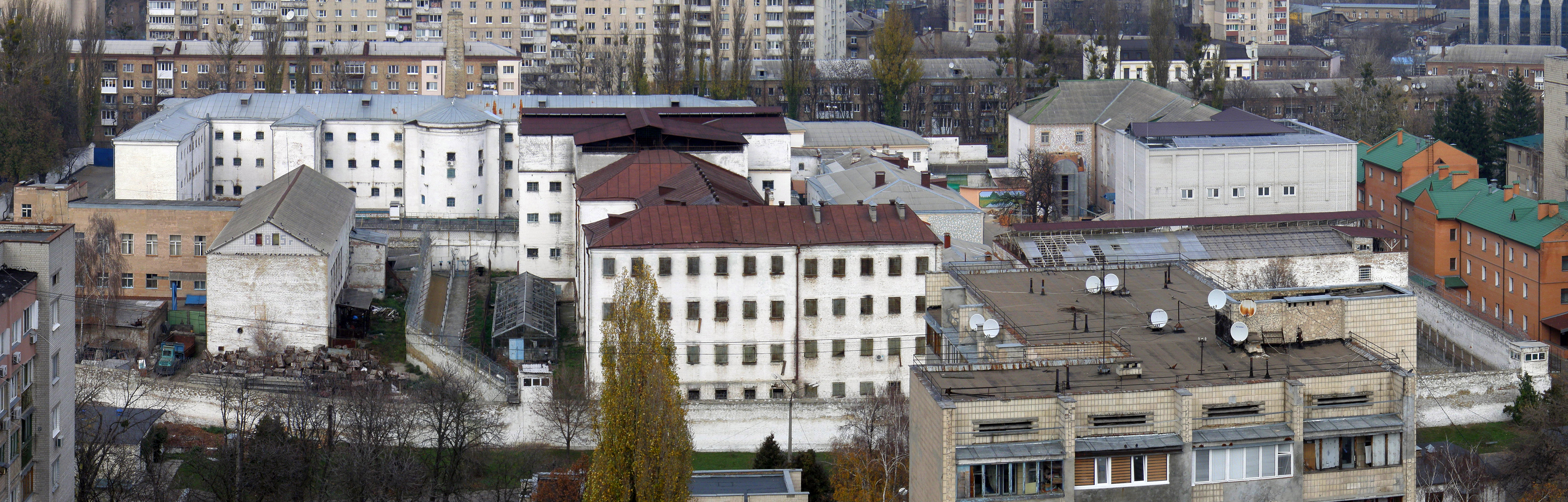
View from the South

== History ==
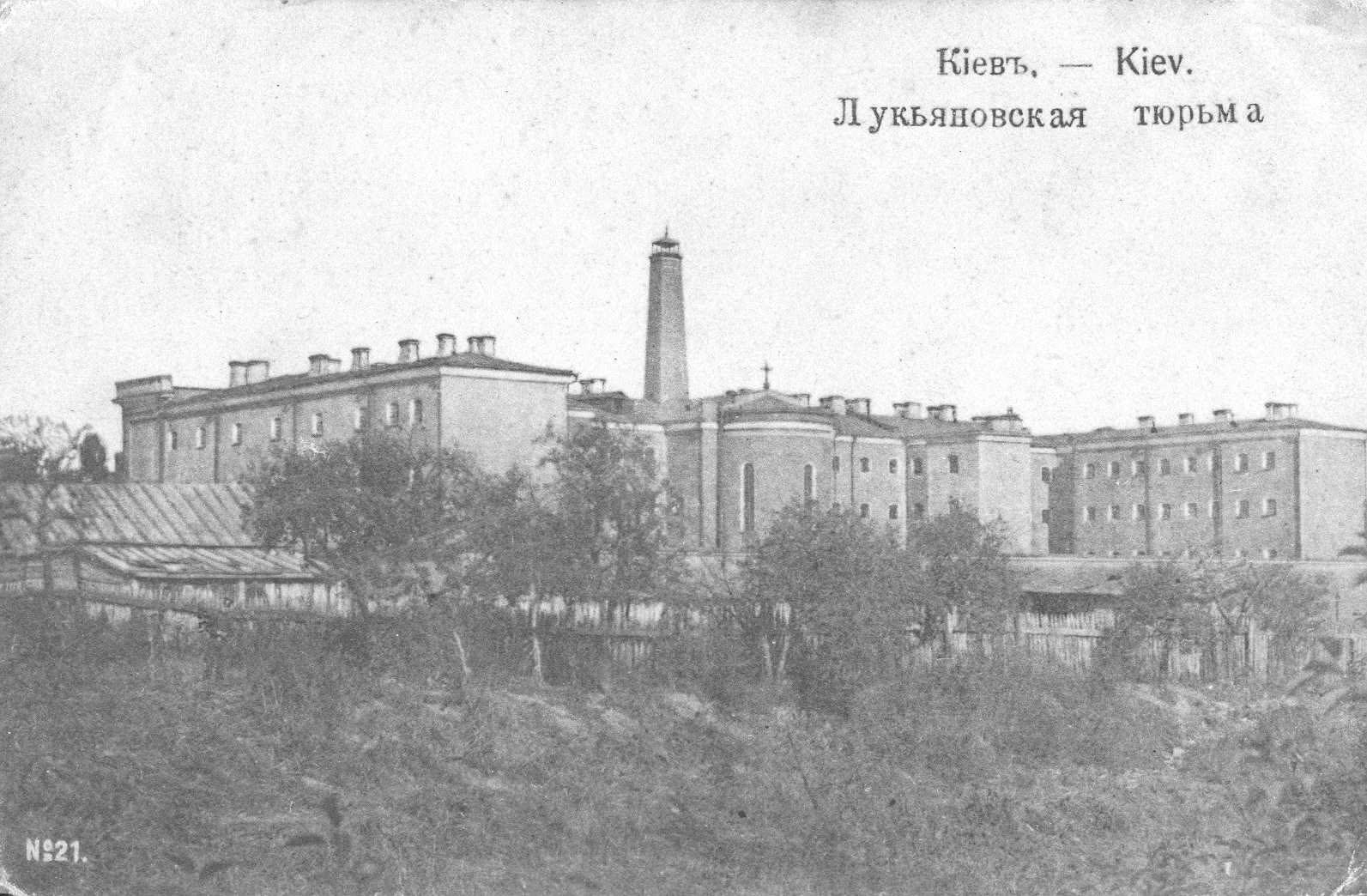
Historic image of Lukyanivska Prison, 1900

The foundation of the prison dates back to the early 19th century, when it was built by the guberniya architect Mikhail Ikonnikov in 1859-1862. It was officially commissioned in 1863. In Soviet times, the prison's church was converted to include extra holding cells. The prison contains several subterranean corridors that connect the prison's buildings with each other. During the Stalinism it was the prison of the OGPU Ministry of Internal Affairs of the Soviet Union, during which time it accounted for more than 25,000 inmates.

The prison consists of several buildings that over the years were uniquely titled by the holdovers. The oldest building is known as Katenka. It is the building that kept all of those sentenced to life imprisonment. The next oldest building is called Stolypinka which was named after the Russian Prime Minister Stolypin. Later, another two buildings were added to its structure: Brezhnivka (built after the war) and Kuchmovka (built during the Ukrainian independence). There is also a juvenile detention building known as Maloletka ("Underage") or Stalinka. Other buildings are ZhK (female building), Bolnichka (Hospital).

Ukrainian Ombudsman Nina Karpachova stated in September 2011 that while the facility was designed for 2,850 inmates, 3,800 were held there at the time; she also pointed out that 47 inmates with active tuberculosis threatened the health of other inmates and personnel. It is reported that there is no hot water in the facility. According to TVi, the constitutional rights of prisoners have been violated in the institute. In April 2012, Kyiv Prosecutor Anatoliy Melnyk stated the facility was and had been regularly overcrowded.

To improve the living conditions of inmates, the Ukrainian Ministry of Justice put the Lukyanivska complex on sale in late February 2016. Its buyer has to build a new detention facility outside Kyiv in exchange for the territory of Lukyanivska Prison.

== Notable inmates ==
- Felix Dzerzhinsky, later head of the Cheka and OGPU
- Maxim Litvinov (Meir Wallach), a Soviet diplomat
- Archduke Wilhelm of Austria, a Ukrainian national activist, military leader
- Oleg Orlov, an arms smuggler and the prototype for the main protagonist in Lord of War
- Yulia Tymoshenko, political activist, former Prime Minister of Ukraine
  - In February 2001, Tymoshenko spent 42 days there as a suspect in a corruption case, but was later acquitted. The prison experienced mass protests and picketing by her supporters.
  - During her trial over abuse of office Tymoshenko was arrested and again detained at Lukyanivska Prison between August 5, 2011, and 2014.
- Josyf Slipyj, a Cardinal of the Ukrainian Greek Catholic Church
- Hryhory Khomyshyn, a Ukrainian Catholic bishop and martyr
- Maksym Rylsky, a Ukrainian poet
- Sergei Parajanov, an Armenian film director
- Anatoly Lunacharsky, a Soviet People's Commissar (Sovnarkom)
- Nikolai Kibalchich, a rocket pioneer, Russian revolutionary
- Irina Kakhovskaya, an organizer of General von Eichhorn assassination
- Yulia Krukovskaya, a Narodnik revolutionary
- Jarosław Dąbrowski, a Polish national activist, military leader
- Vyacheslav Chornovil, a Ukrainian national activist
- Moisei Uritsky, a chekist, Old Bolshevik
- Volodymyr Vynnychenko, a Prime Minister of Ukraine in the Ukrainian People's Republic
- Nikolay Bauman, an Old Bolshevik
- Pavel Bermondt-Avalov, a Russian general
- Several activists of the 2001 UBK campaign were inmates of the facility when convicted for riot activities.
- Yuriy Lutsenko, a former Ukrainian Minister of Internal Affairs
- Tamara Ivanyutina, Soviet serial killer
- Anatoliy Tymofeev, serial killer and one of the last inmates to be executed in Ukraine
