= Dadash Babazhanov =

Soviet Uyghur machine gunner (1922–1985)

- Дадаш Бабажанов
- Born: 1 March 1922; Uzynagash
- Died: 6 February 1985 (aged 62); Uzynagash, Kazakh SSR, Soviet Union
- Military career
- Allegiance: Soviet Union
- Branch: Red Army
- Service years: 1941–1945
- Rank: Private
- Unit: 1369th Rifle Regiment
- Conflicts: World War II
- Awards: Hero of the Soviet Union

Dadash Babazhanov (Russian: Дадаш Бабажанов; 1 March 1922 – 6 February 1985) was a Uyghur machine gunner in the 1369th Rifle Regiment of the Red Army during World War II who was awarded the title Hero of the Soviet Union in 1945.
