= X Factor (Kazakhstani TV series) series 1 =

X Factor
- Series 1
- Hosted by: Adil Liyan
- Judges: Nagima Eskalieva; Sultana Karazhigitova; Alexander Shevchenko
- Winner: Daria Gabdull
- Runner-up: Spasibo

Release
- Original network: Perviy Kanal Evraziya
- Original release: 23 January – 22 May 2011

X Factor is a Kazakh music talent show for aspiring pop stars across the nation and is based on the international franchise. The first season in Kazakhstan started in January 2011. Auditions were held in 12 Kazakh cities and started on 2 October 2010.
The Judges were the three music producers Nagima Eskalieva, who was the already the chairwoman of the panel of SuperStar KZ, Sultana Karazhigitova and Alexander Shevchenko.

On 22 May 2011, the back then-22-year-old Daria Gabdull (Дария Габдулл), labeled by the judges as the "Kazakh Beyoncé", won the show ahead of the trio Spasibo. Gabdull won a two-years-contract with Sony Music.

== Selection process ==
=== Judges' houses and wildcards ===
After the auditions, twenty-four candidates were chosen, eight in each of three categories. They were:

- 16-24s: Daria Akparova, Ruslan Berdimatov, Eliza Dzhakereeva, Alexander Filatov, Daria Gabdull, Louise Karimbaeva, Abdulkarim Karimov, Ruslan Krivenkov
- 25 and over: Maral Dzhusupova, Asel Karsybaeva, Eldar Myrzakhanov, Yuri Mukhortov, Gulzhiyan Ospanova, Julia Pereima, Dmitry Tsoi, Margarita Tumanyan
- Vocal groups: Musaev sisters, Vladimir Kim & Marina Beysehanova, Ansari, Dee Kree, Spasibo, Sweet, National, Faith Kahn & Serik Salmakeev

The twelve eliminated acts were:

- 16-24s: Eliza Dzhakereeva, Alexander Filatov, Louise Karimbaeva, Ruslan Krivenkov
- 25 and over: Maral Dzhusupova, Eldar Myrzakhanov, Julia Pereima, Dmitry Tsoi
- Vocal groups: Musaev sisters, Vladimir Kim & Marina Beysehanova, Ansari, Sweet

Although they were eliminated in the judges' house stage, Musaev Sisters, Eldar Myrzahanov and Ruslan Krivenkov were brought back as wildcards.

== Contestants ==
After the wildcards were revealed in the first live show, the final fifteen acts were confirmed as follows:

Key:

– Winner
– Runner-up
– Third Place

Category (mentor)	Acts				
16-24s (Shevchenko)	Daria Akparova	Ruslan Berdimatov	Daria Gabdull	Abdulkarim Karimov	Ruslan Krivenkov
Over-25s (Eskalieva)	Asel Karsybaeva	Yuri Mukhortov	Eldar Myrzahanov	Gulzhiyan Ospanov	Margarita Tumanyan
Groups (Karazhigitova)	Astana	Dee Kree	Musaev Sisters	National	Spasibo

== Live shows ==
=== Results summary ===
Colour key

–	Contestant was in the bottom two/three and had to sing again in the final showdown
–	Contestant was in the bottom three but received the fewest votes and was immediately eliminated
–	Contestant received the fewest public votes and was immediately eliminated (no final showdown)
–	Contestant received the most public votes

Weekly results per contestant
	Week 1	Week 2	Week 3	Week 4	Week 5	Week 6	Week 7	Week 8	Week 9	Week 10	Week 11
Daria Gabdull	Safe	Safe	Safe	Safe	Safe	Safe	Safe	Safe	Safe	Safe	Winner (Week 11)
Spasibo	Safe	Safe	Safe	Safe	Safe	Safe	Safe	Safe	Safe	Safe	Runner-Up (Week 11)
Asel Karsybaeva	Safe	Safe	Bottom three	Safe	Safe	Safe	Safe	Bottom two	Safe	3rd	Eliminated (week 10)
Ruslan Krivenkov	Safe	Safe	Safe	Safe	Safe	Safe	Safe	Safe	4th	Eliminated (week 9)	
National	Safe	Bottom three	Safe	Safe	Safe	Safe	Bottom two	Bottom two	Eliminated (week 8)		
Yuri Mukhortov	Bottom three	Safe	Safe	Bottom two	Safe	Bottom two	Bottom two	Eliminated (week 7)			
Abdulkarim Karimov	Safe	Safe	Safe	Safe	Bottom two	Bottom two	Eliminated (week 6)				
Musaev Sisters	Safe	Safe	Safe	Safe	Bottom two	Eliminated (week 5)					
Eldar Myrzahanov	Safe	Safe	Safe	Bottom two	Eliminated (week 4)						
Margarita Tumanyan	Safe	Safe	Bottom three	Eliminated (week 3)							
Daria Akparova	Safe	Safe	11th	Eliminated (week 3)							
Gulzhiyan Ospanova	Safe	Bottom three	Eliminated (week 2)								
Dee Kree	Safe	13th	Eliminated (week 2)								
Ruslan Berdimatov	Bottom three	Eliminated (week 1)									
Astana	15th	Eliminated (week 1)									
Final showdown	Ruslan Berdimatov, Yuri Mukhortov	Gulzhiyan Ospanova, National	Asel Karsybaeva, Margarita Tumanyan	Eldar Myrzahanov, Yuri Mukhortov	Abdulkarim Karimov, Musaev Sisters	Abdulkarim Karimov, Yuri Mukhortov	National, Yuri Mukhortov	Asel Karsybaeva, National	No final showdown or judges' vote: results are based on public votes alone		
Shevchenko's vote	Yuri Mukhortov	Gulzhiyan Ospanova	Margarita Tumanyan	Eldar Myrzahanov	Musaev Sisters	Yuri Mukhortov	Yuri Mukhortov	National	No final showdown or judges' vote: results are based on public votes alone		
Eskalieva's vote	Ruslan Berdimatov	National	None (refused)	None (refused)	Musaev Sisters	Abdulkarim Karimov	National	National	No final showdown or judges' vote: results are based on public votes alone		
Karazhigitova's vote	Ruslan Berdimatov	Gulzhiyan Ospanova	Margarita Tumanyan	Eldar Myrzahanov	Abdulkarim Karimov	Abdulkarim Karimov	Yuri Mukhortov	Asel Karsybaeva	No final showdown or judges' vote: results are based on public votes alone		
Eliminated	Astana	Dee Kree	Daria Akparova	Eldar Myrzahanov; 2 of 2 votes	Musaev Sisters; 2 of 3 votes	Abdulkarim Karimov; 2 of 3 votes	Yuri Mukhortov; 2 of 3 votes	National; 2 of 3 votes	Ruslan Krivenkov	Asel Karsybaeva	Spasibo
Eliminated	Ruslan Berdimatov; 2 of 3 votes	Gulzhiyan Ospanov; 2 of 3 votes	Margarita Tumanyan; 2 of 2 votes	Eldar Myrzahanov; 2 of 2 votes	Musaev Sisters; 2 of 3 votes	Abdulkarim Karimov; 2 of 3 votes	Yuri Mukhortov; 2 of 3 votes	National; 2 of 3 votes	Ruslan Krivenkov	Asel Karsybaeva	Daria Gabdulla

=== Live show details ===
==== Week 1 (12/13 March) ====
- Theme: American Songs

A summary of the contestants' performances on the first live show and results show, along with the results.
Act	Order	Song	Result
Ruslan Krivenko	1	"It's My Life"	Safe
Margarita Tumanyan	2	"New York, New York"	Safe
Astana	3	"This Love"	Eliminated
Abdulkarim Karimov	4	"Love To See You Cry"	Safe
Spasibo	5	"Hit the Road Jack"	Safe
Asel Karsybaeva	6	"Run To You"	Safe
Daria Gabdull	7	"If I Were a Boy"	Safe
Yuri Mukhortov	8	"Puttin On The Ritz"	Bottom Three
National	9	"Tears in Heaven"	Safe
Ruslan Berdimatov	10	"Baby"	Bottom Three
Eldar Myrzahanov	11	"End of the Road"	Safe
Musaev Sisters	12	"It's Raining Men"	Safe
Gulzhiyan Ospanova	13	"Left Outside Alone"	Safe
Dee Kree	14	"Beautiful Liar"	Safe
Daria Akparova	15	"Lady Marmalade"	Safe
Final showdown details
Yuri Mukhortov	TBA	TBA	Safe
Ruslan Berdimatov	TBA	TBA	Eliminated

Judges' votes to eliminate

- Nagima Eskalieva: Ruslan Berdimatov, backed her own act
- Sultana Karazhigitova: Ruslan Berdimatov
- Alexander Shevchenko: Yuri Mukhortov, backed his own act

==== Week 2 (19/20 March) ====
- Theme: TBA

A summary of the contestants' performances on the second live show and results show, along with the results.
Act	Order	Song	Result
Gulzhiyan Ospanova	1	"Crank"	Bottom three
National	2	TBA	Bottom three
Daria Gabdull	3	TBA	Safe
Dee Kree	4	"Sun"	Eliminated
Eldar Myrzahanov	5	"Семь тысяч над землей"	Safe
Daria Akparova	6	"Fashion Girl"	Safe
Musaev Sisters	7	"Solitude"	Safe
Yuri Mukhortov	8	TBA	Safe
Abdulkarim Karimov	9	TBA	Safe
Spasibo	10	TBA	Safe
Margarita Tumanyan	11	TBA	Safe
Ruslan Krivenkov	12	"Boombox"	Safe
Asel Karsybaeva	13	"Best"	Safe
Final showdown details
Gulzhiyan Ospanova	TBA	TBA	Eliminated
National	TBA	TBA	Eliminated

Judges' votes to eliminate

- Nagima Eskalieva: National, backed her own act
- Sultana Karazhigitova: Gulzhiyan Ospanova, backed her own act
- Alexander Shevchenko: Gulzhiyan Ospanova

==== Week 3 (26/27 March) ====
- Theme: Kazakh Songs

A summary of the contestants' performances on the third live show and results show, along with the results.
Act	Order	Song	Result
Yuri Mukhortov	1	TBA	Safe
Daria Gabdull	2	TBA	Safe
Musaev Sisters	3	TBA	Safe
National	4	TBA	Safe
Ruslan Krivenkov	5	TBA	Safe
Eldar Myrzahanov	6	TBA	Safe
Margarita Tumanyan	7	"TBA"	Bottom Three
Asel Karsybaeva	8	TBA	Bottom Three
Daria Akparova	9	TBA	Eliminated
Abdulkarim Karimov	10	TBA	Safe
Spasibo	11	TBA	Safe
Final showdown details
Margarita Tumanyan	TBA	TBA	Eliminated
Asel Karsybaeva	TBA	TBA	Eliminated

Judges' votes to eliminate

- Nagima Eskalieva: refused to vote
- Sultana Karazhigitova: Margarita Tumanyan
- Alexander Shevchenko: Margarita Tumanyan

==== Week 4 (4/5 April) ====
- Theme: Movie Songs

A summary of the contestants' performances on the fourth live show and results show, along with the results.
Act	Order	Song	Movie	Result
National	1	"Men in Black"	Men in Black	Safe
Asel Karsybaeva	2	"Stop!"	9½ Weeks	Safe
Ruslan Krivenkov	3	"She's Like The Wind"	Dirty Dancing	Safe
Spasibo	4	"The Money Song"	Cabaret	Safe
Abdulkarim Karimow	5	"(Where Do I Begin?) Love Story"	Love Story	Safe
Eldar Myrzahanov	6	"About Hares"	The Diamond Arm	Bottom two
Daria Gabdull	7	"Unchained Melody"	Ghost	Safe
Yuri Mukhortov	8	"You Never Can Tell"	Pulp Fiction	Bottom two
Musaev Sisters	9	"Jimmy Jimmy"	Disco Dancer	Safe
Final showdown details
Eldar Myrzahanov	TBA	TBA	N/A	Eliminated
Yuri Mukhortov	TBA	TBA	N/A	Safe

Judges' votes to eliminate

- Nagima Eskalieva: Eldar Myrzahanov
- Sultana Karazhigitova: Eldar Myrzahanov
- Alexander Shevchenko: refused to vote
