= Yulia Krukovskaya =

- Юлия Круковская
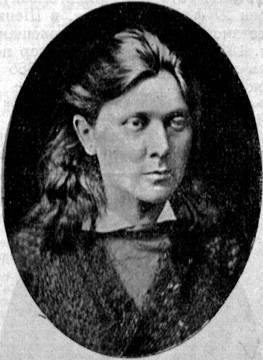
- Krukovskaya in 1870
- Born: 1850; Mglin, Chernihiv, Russian Empire
- Died: 1913 (aged 62–63); Chita, Transbaikal, Russian Empire
- Resting place: Mglin, Bryansk, Russia
- Movement: Narodniks
- Relatives: Olena Kosach (cousin); Lesya Ukrainka (grandniece)

Yulia Iosifovna Krukovskaya (Russian: Юлия Иосифовна Круковская; (Note: Also known by the Ukrainian: Юлія Осипівна Круковська, romanized: Yulia Osypivna Krukovska) 1850–1913) was a Russian Narodnik revolutionary. Associated with the revolutionary circle in Kyiv, where she worked with Anna Kuliscioff, Leo Deutsch and Yakov Stefanovich, she was arrested and exiled to Siberia for her activities.

== Biography ==
Krukovska was born in 1850, in the Chernihiv Governorate of the Russian Empire, the daughter of a school supervisor. She lived with her father until 1875, when she moved to Kyiv in order to work in a workers' orphanage run by her cousin Olena Kosach. The following year, she was investigated for having helped Anna Kuliscioff obtain a passport and escape abroad. Suspected of being involved in a criminal association, Krukovska was kept under surveillance by Kyiv provincial police, but after a year they found no evidence and terminated their investigation of her.

Krukovska then made contact with the revolutionary circle around Leo Deutsch and Yakov Stefanovich, helping run their clandestine printing operations in Kyiv. Towards the end of 1877, she was arrested and imprisoned in Lukyanivska Prison, awaiting trial. Together with Deutsch and Stefanovich, on 8 July 1879, she was found guilty of destroying evidence of their clandestine printing operations and sentenced to three and a half years of exile in Irkutsk. On 17 January 1881, her case was reviewed and her sentence increased to 13 years of penal labour.

Throughout the 1880s, Krukovska was transferred between various Siberian prisons, before being released in August 1890. She settled in Chita in the Transbaikal Oblast, where she died. She was buried in Mglin, where her epitaph reads: "Lord, rest her soul in Your kingdom my dear sufferer Yulia, who fought for fraternity, equality, freedom and independence of all nations and estates without distinction of position and condition."

== Bibliography ==
- Shilov, A. A.; Karnaukhova, M. G., eds. (1930). "Круковская (Бубновская) Юлия Осиповна" [Krukovskaya (Bubnovskaya) Yulia Osipovna]. Деятели революционного движения в России (in Russian). Vol. 2. Moscow: Society of Former Political Prisoners and Exiled Settlers. pp. 691–692. OCLC 749336544.
- Protchenko, Z.E. (2003). "Пропаганда народничества" [Propaganda of Narodnikism]. Земля Мглинская — родной край (историческая повесть) (in Russian). Bryansk: Bryansk Regional Polygraphic Association.
