= Anatoliy Tymofeev =

Executed Ukrainian serial killer

- Born: Anatoliy Krivobok; 1960; Berezan, Kyiv Oblast, Ukrainian SSR
- Died: August 1996 (aged 35–36); Lukyanivska Prison, Kyiv, Ukraine
- Cause of death: Execution by shooting
- Convictions: Murder x13 Attempted murder x1
- Penalty: Death

Details
- Victims: 13–17
- Span of crimes: 1991 – 1992 (possibly 1990)
- Country: Ukraine, Russia
- States: Kyiv, Vinnytsia, Moscow, Kaluga (possibly Kirovohrad)
- Date apprehended: September 19, 1992

Anatoliy Tymofeev (né Krivobok; 1960 – August 1996) was a Ukrainian serial killer and burglar who murdered at least 13 pensioners in both Ukraine and Russia between 1991 and 1992. He was convicted, sentenced to death and executed, one of the last to be executed in Ukraine prior to the abolition of the death penalty.

== Early life ==
Anatoliy Krivobok was born in Berezan in 1960. Little is known about his childhood, but according to his later claims, Krivobok had a harsh upbringing, and at age 12, was sent to a juvenile detention center in Zhmerynka. While living there, he claimed to have been physically assaulted by both other delinquents and the prison staff on a regular basis, even when he was sick. Due to this, he escaped the facility on two separate occasions, but was caught both times and harshly disciplined. As a result, Krivobok began stealing in his teens, for which he was first arrested in 1981 and ordered to serve 3 years in prison. Shortly after his release, he was caught stealing again and given another prison term.

In 1990, Krivobok was released again serving his out the entirety of his sentence. In the early 1990s, due to the difficult political situation and poor economic status of the country, Krivobok had trouble with finding a normal job and was inclined to return to his old habits. Despite this, he attempted to lead a normal life, marrying a woman in October 1990 and starting a family of his own. In an effort to sever ties with his criminal past, he decided to legally change his surname to that of his wife, renaming himself to Anatoliy Tymofeev.

== Crime spree ==
=== Murders in Ukraine ===
Not long after, the newly renamed Tymofeev returned to his criminal ways, and began burgling into the houses of elderly residents in the Kyiv Oblast to steal small items of value. On September 11, 1991, while burgling one such home in Brovary, he overheard that the elderly resident, a woman named Scherbak, was entering the house. Tymofeev initially hid from sight, but when he saw that the woman hadn't seen him yet, he crept up behind her and hit her with an iron pestle, knocking her to the ground. Unwilling to leave a witness and risk going to the penal colony again, Tymofeev took off his belt and strangled Scherbak. In what later become his trademark, he turned the house upside down until he found some money and gold jewellery, set it on fire and promptly left.

After this murder, he has not been definitely linked to any other crime until the early morning of April 20, 1992. On that date, he had broken into three consecutive homes in the village of Pristromi, Pereiaslav-Khmelnytskyi Raion, but had only managed to steal a small amount of karbovantsi and 20 shawls. After breaking into the fourth house, he happened upon the pensioner living in it, Bobrovnik. Wanting to vent out his frustrations, Tymofeev grabbed a kitchen board and hit her on the head, causing her to flinch, hit herself on a heating pipe and subsequently collapse. Believing that she was dead, Tymofeev rummaged through the house, stole everything of value and left, locking the door behind him. Despite her injuries, Bobrovnik survived the attack and called for help, resulting in her eventual recovery.

Emboldened by his apparent success in eluding capture, Tymofeev became more active in his endeavors. Just a week after the last attack, on April 28, he struck again in Korniyivka, Baryshivka Raion, where the retired nurse Sukhomlin lived. Using an axe wrapped in cloth, he struck Sukhomlin several times on the head and then strangled her with a noose made from some rags, before setting the house ablaze. On August 14, he found himself in Zelenki, Myronivka Raion, where he stole from two separate homes and was even chased after by the local villagers, but eluded capture. Unsatisfied with his haul, he wandered around the village until he broke into another house, where he was immediately found out by the resident, the elderly Baglay. Frightened, she ran out into her garden, but Tymofeev caught up to her and hanged a rope over her neck, forcefully dragging the woman back inside and strangling her there. He then ransacked Baglay's house and fled, but in his haste, he dropped his personal documents. A few hours later, realizing that he had lost his documents and risked being labeled a fugitive by authorities, he fled towards the neighboring Vinnytsia Oblast.

Three days later, he broke into a two-storey house in Bar, where he strangled the homeowner Protsenko and robbed the first floor, before going to the second one and repeating the act with another woman, Bornaya. An hour after that, he broke into yet another home, where he strangled another woman, Gaidaevskaya. The day after, he committed his final known murder in Ukraine, breaking to the Zhmerynka home of 88-year-old pensioner Zh. After she happened upon the intruder, Tymofeev knocked the woman to the ground and tortured her until she revealed where she kept her valuables. After learning this, he raped Zh. and strangled her to death.

=== Murders in Russia ===
Sensing that the Ukrainian authorities were closing in on him, Tymofeev decided to flee the country, moving to Voskresenka, Kaluga Oblast in Russia, where his wife and mother-in-law lived. After living under the radar for a few days, he resumed his activities, using the Moscow-Kaluga railway to travel to Aprelevka. When the train arrived, he took notice of a small house where 73-year-old A. Zubakova was plucking chickens in her yard. When she wasn't looking, Tymofeev sneaked into the house, where he found her 82-year-old sister, N., sleeping on a bed. Deciding that he'd get rid of them both, Tymofeev moved to the yard, where he strangled A. with a noose and then hid her body and the garden, before returning to the house and killing her sister in the same manner. He then ransacked the house, took everything of value and fled.

On September 11, he traveled to Medyn, where he broke into the home of a woman named Churbakova and strangled her, taking only one bottle of vodka from the residence. Several days later, he went on a burgling spree in Maloyaroslavets, breaking into three consecutive houses, but came out empty-handed. Angered, he continued to a fourth house, where he strangled the homeowner Kondruschina and stole four bottles of vodka. Still unsatisfied with his haul, he went into yet another, seemingly empty home. Upon further inspection, Tymofeev opened a back room and found the 88-year-old owner of the home, Bylinin, who was sleeping in his bed. Without hesitance, he quickly strangled the man, and when his 83-year-old wife came to check in on him, she too was killed. He then stole some gold jewellery from the house and fled.

== Arrest, trial and execution ==
By this time, police units from both Ukraine and Russia were aware that a serial murderer was active, as witnesses had given similar descriptions of a slenderly-built young man being seen near the crime scenes. As a result, on September 19, 1992, Tymofeev was detained at the Moscow Kiyevsky railway station and brought in for questioning. While initially uncooperative, he soon confessed his crimes to the Russian authorities, who quickly extradited him to Ukraine. There, he gave detailed confessions to his crimes to the investigators in Baryshivka, revealing details about murders which, until then, were either not connected to the case or weren't considered homicides at all.

Soon after, Tymofeev was charged with 13 counts of aggravated murder before the courts. At trial, prosecutors tried to tie the defendant to four cold cases that matched his modus operandi, but Tymofeev ultimately was not tried for any of them due to lack of evidence. They were the following:

- December 25, 1990: murder of woman Laskavaya in Khmelovyk, Baryshivka Raion
- December 26, 1990: murder of woman Norets in Stara Orzhytsia, Brovary Raion
- August 28, 1991: murder of woman Kravchenko in Trypillia, Obukhiv Raion
- March 21, 1992: murder of woman Korolya in Svitlovodsk, Kirovohrad Oblast

During the proceedings, Tymofeev was cited as acting "indifferent", replying to all questions in a calm, laconic manner. His only surviving victim, Bobrovnik, also testified against him at the trial. Eventually, he was convicted of the 13 murders and sentenced to death. He lodged an appeal to the Supreme Court of Ukraine in 1995, citing his rough childhood and prison sentences as a drive that made him mad "like the Zmei Gorynych", causing him to kill any potential witnesses to his crimes. His appeal was unanimously denied, with one judge describing him as a "beast that couldn't be left alive". Because of this, in spite of pressure from the Council of Europe to abolish the death penalty, Anatoliy Tymofeev was nonetheless executed at the Lukyanivska Prison in Kyiv in August 1996, becoming the last inmate to have been executed by court order in the country.

== See also ==
- List of serial killers by country
