= Alexander Skrynnik =

Soviet serial killer

- Born: Alexander Ivanovich Skrynnik; 1953; USSR
- Died: 1981 (aged 27–28); USSR
- Cause of death: Execution by shooting
- Other name: "The Moldavian Chikatilo"
- Status: Executed
- Conviction: Murder with aggravating circumstances
- Penalty: Death

Details
- Victims: 3
- Span of crimes: 1970s–1980
- Country: Soviet Union
- States: Moldavian SSR, Yakut ASSR
- Date apprehended: 1980

Alexander Ivanovich Skrynnik (1953–1981), known as The Moldavian Chikatilo, was a Soviet serial killer who committed his crimes in Chișinău and Yakutia.

== Biography ==
The exact date and place of birth of Skrynnik is unclear (it is known that he lived in Chișinău and in 1980 he was 27 years old). He considered himself a loser in his personal life, and envied other men. His marriage was unhappy: after he had a child, Skrynnik realized that he did not love his wife. One day, his friend Feodosiy Glukharyov boasted to him about his success in love. After this, Skrynnik made an advertisement in the newspaper that he was searching for a lover, but the girl he met infected him with venereal disease, which made Skrynnik decide that women are the source of all the ills in the world, and must be destroyed.

=== Murders ===
In the mid-1970s, Skrynnik went to work in Yakutia. There he killed stewardess Nina Puganova, cutting off her breasts and genitals. Although her torn body was found, it did not lead to the killer, and the murder remained unsolved until Skrynnik's capture.

Later, Skrynnik returned to Chișinău, where he worked as a carpenter in the "Bucuria" factory, was an udarnik and a candidate member of the CPSU. In 1980, he committed another murder. He took Irina Trasyn, who had a seven-year-old child, on a date treating her with ice cream before stabbing her multiple times with a knife. Skrynnik then removed her eyes and cut off her head, which he put in a briefcase. The killer then brought the briefcase to Glukharyov, attaching the following note to it:

Fyodor, did you see the gift? This is your example. Prepare 10 thousand! Or your daughter will be headless too. Come to the station in the evening, and bring the money.

Initially, Glukharyov was suspected of killing her. The investigation had a version that he had been a member of a criminal group but decided to cut off ties with the criminal world, and they had decided to intimidate him. It was impossible to identify the victim, as she was left without eyes. With the permission of the Moldavian SSR, the head of the murdered Trasyn was shown on television. After that, police were called by 7-year-old Viktor Trasyn, the son of the deceased. He recognized his mother, whom he had not seen in a week. As he was left an orphan, the boy was put in an orphanage. Soon after, Skrynnik killed a new victim named Anastasia Mikhailova, bringing to Glukharyov her severed hand. The examination later established that the head and the hand belonged to different people. Different theories began to appear: some claimed that there were necromancer-sorcerers in Chișinău, digging up corpses from the graves, while others claimed that a maniac who had operated in the USSR at the time, Nikolai Dzhumagaliev, had reached the Moldavian capital. A note had been placed yet again in the hand of the victim:

Fyodor, you still do not want to pay? You do not believe that we are not afraid of blood? Then kiss the female hand. In three days you will bring money to the station. Otherwise, we will chop your daughter into pieces.

After reading the letter, operatives decided to put guards on watch for Oksana, Glukharyov's daughter. Once Skrynnik, who was among the suspects, went into the Glukharyovs' house courtyard, the plain-clothed operatives tried to detain him, but Oksana told them: "Let Uncle Sasha go, he is good." The decided to organize a meeting between Glukharyov and the alleged gangsters - the possible murderers. Under the guise of railway workers at the Chișinău railway station, they set up an ambush. Glukharyov arrived at the station, but one came to him.

While investigating the case, Anatoly Magdalyuk, senior investigator for particularly important cases under the Prosecutor's Office of the Moldavian SSR, drew attention to an interesting fact: Glukharyov preferred that people not call him Feodosiy, but Fyodor — a name only relatives and good friends called him. From this followed the conclusion that the murder was committed by a person who knew Glukharyov very well. His second cousin, Dmitry Kozintsev, a restaurant owner to whom Glukharyov took his bride to the wedding, came into view. A scandal broke out, with Kozintsev threatening to kill Glukharyov, but the matter was hushed up. Once at the station, an undercover operative called Dmitry Kozintsev by name and surname, upon which he tried to flee, but stumbled and was quickly detained. However, it turned out that Kozintsev was only involved in the embezzlement of socialist property, which he had been long suspected of.

Not long after, Skrynnik attacked another girl, Olga Lebedeva, in the Central Park of Culture and Rest of Lenin Komsomol. He tried to rape and kill her, but the victim managed to escape and call for help. She said that the offender shouted at her: "I will cut you into pieces, creature". These words caused the investigators to go investigate the park, where they found the headless body of Trasyn. Lebedeva said that she had seen her attacker's face, and it was a man she had seen previously after the announcement. He had come to see her, but quickly left and then attacked her (so he attacked her again this time). She had kept the letters from him, the author of which turned out to be Skrynnik. However, it wasn't possible to compare the handwriting of the killer and Glukharyov, as the notes the maniac sent were written in block letters. Skrynnik was then summoned to the military registration and enlistment office, where he was required to fill out documents in block letters, and they coincided with the handwriting of the killer.

=== Arrest, trial ===
Alexander Skrynnik was detained at the "Patria" cinema, where he had gone with a girl. He admitted his crimes without any repentance, calling himself an "orderly of nature". At his trial, he stated that he would describe all the terrible things he had done and asked for those with a weak stomach to leave. The Supreme Court of the Moldavian SSR sentenced Skrynnik to death, and he was subsequently executed by firing squad, but the exact date is unknown.

== In the media ==
- Documentary film "Head in a portfolio" from the series "The investigation was conducted...". TV channel NTV, November 27, 2011.

== See also ==
- List of serial killers by country
