= Uzynagash =

Uzynagash Узынағаш
- Village
- Location in Kazakhstan
- Coordinates: 43°13′47″N 76°18′36″E
- Country: Kazakhstan
- Region: Almaty Region
- District: Zhambyl District

Population (2021 (census))
  - Total: 46,159
- Time zone: UTC+6 (Omsk Time)
- Postal code: 040600
- Area code: 72770

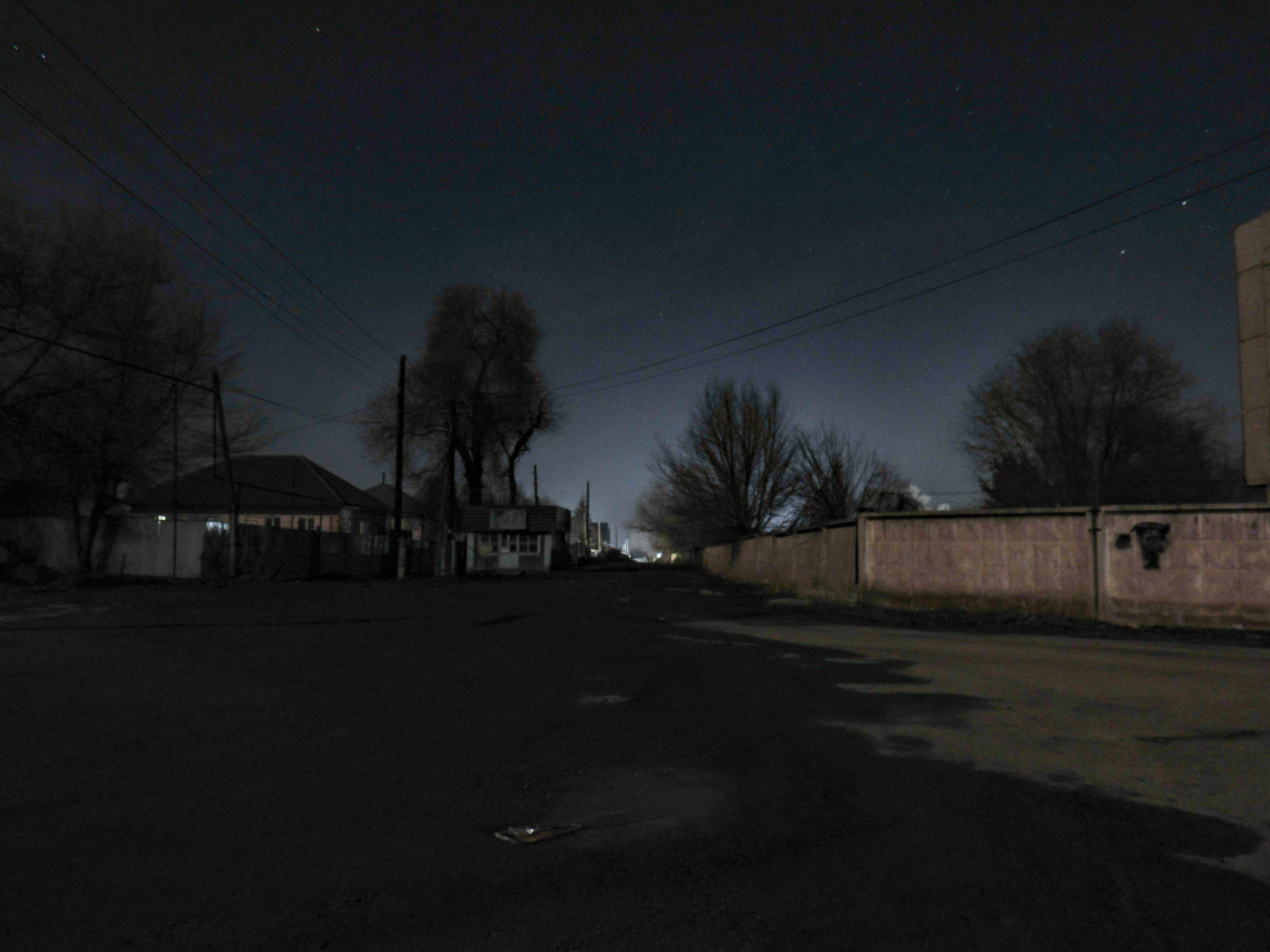
Uzynagash, Almaty Region, Kazakhstan

Uzynagash (Kazakh: Узынағаш, romanized: Uzynağaş) is a selo in Zhambyl District in Almaty Region of south-eastern Kazakhstan. It is the capital of the district. Population: 30,589 (2009 census results); 23,887 (1999 census results).

== Location ==
Uzynagash is a village in Zhambyl district. Its geographical location is 314 km from the Taldykorgan city to the south-west, 44 km from Almaty to the west. The village in 1929 - 1956 was a center of production of agricultural dairy products at Lenin Farmhouse. Its name in Kazakh means "Long tree", referring to the trees growing in the surrounding area.

== Climate ==
Uzynagash has a humid continental climate (Köppen: Dfa), characterized by cold winters and hot summers.

Climate data for Uzynagash (1991–2020)
Month	Jan	Feb	Mar	Apr	May	Jun	Jul	Aug	Sep	Oct	Nov	Dec	Year
Mean daily maximum °C (°F)	−1.4 (29.5)	1.4 (34.5)	9.7 (49.5)	18.1 (64.6)	23.4 (74.1)	28.8 (83.8)	31.5 (88.7)	30.8 (87.4)	25.5 (77.9)	17.4 (63.3)	7.6 (45.7)	0.4 (32.7)	16.1 (61.0)
Daily mean °C (°F)	−8.0 (17.6)	−5.0 (23.0)	3.0 (37.4)	10.7 (51.3)	15.8 (60.4)	20.6 (69.1)	23.0 (73.4)	21.8 (71.2)	16.0 (60.8)	8.3 (46.9)	0.6 (33.1)	−5.8 (21.6)	8.4 (47.1)
Mean daily minimum °C (°F)	−13.4 (7.9)	−10.2 (13.6)	−2.3 (27.9)	4.0 (39.2)	8.0 (46.4)	12.3 (54.1)	14.3 (57.7)	12.6 (54.7)	7.3 (45.1)	1.3 (34.3)	−4.4 (24.1)	−10.5 (13.1)	1.6 (34.9)
Average precipitation mm (inches)	23.7 (0.93)	31.9 (1.26)	47.1 (1.85)	73.8 (2.91)	68.5 (2.70)	48.7 (1.92)	41.8 (1.65)	26.1 (1.03)	18.9 (0.74)	36.7 (1.44)	38.9 (1.53)	31.9 (1.26)	488.0 (19.21)
Average precipitation days (≥ 1.0 mm)	5.3	6.4	7.9	9.3	8.5	7.2	7.0	4.0	3.1	5.1	5.7	6.1	75.6
Source: NOAA

== Notable people ==
- Askhat Kadyrkulov (born 1974), former footballer
- Beibut Atamkulov (born 1964), politician
- Dadash Babazhanov (1922–1985), machine gunner in the Red Army
- Nikolai Dzhumagaliev (born 1952), serial killer and cannibal
