= Aktas =

Aktas Ақтас
- Village
- Location in Kazakhstan
- Coordinates: 43°21′45″N 77°13′11″E
- Country: Kazakhstan
- Region: Almaty Region
- District: Talgar District

Population (2009)
  - Total: 378
- Time zone: UTC+6 (Omsk Time)
- Postal code: 041606

Aktas or Aqtas (Kazakh: Ақтас, Aqtas) is a village in Almaty Region of the south-eastern part of Kazakhstan.
