= Dilnaz Akhmadieva =

Kazakh singer (born 1980)

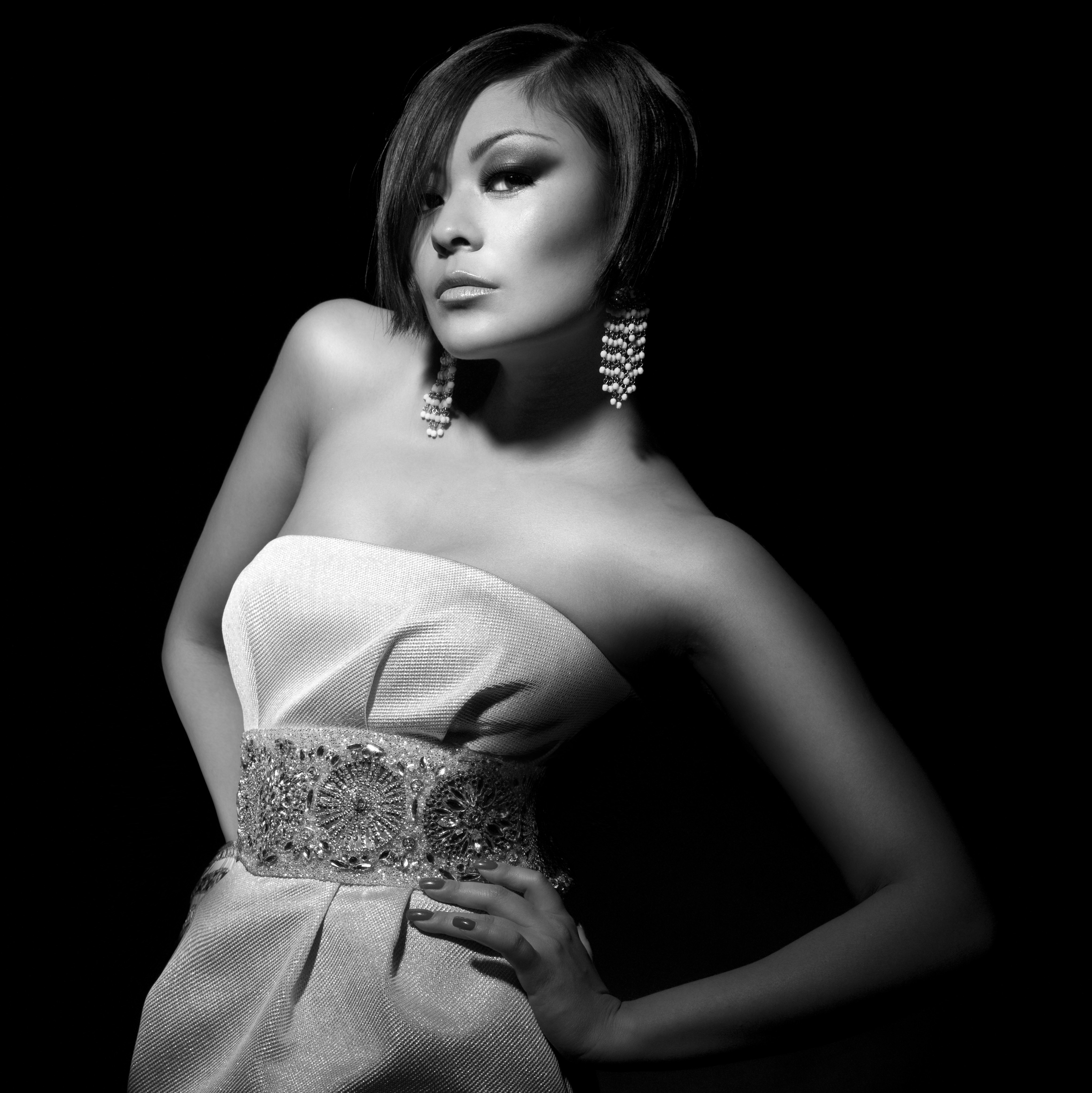

Background information
- Born: Dilnaz Muratkyzy Akhmadieva; November 20, 1980 (age 45); Alma-Ata, Kazakh SSR, Soviet Union
- Genres: Kazakh pop
- Occupations: Singer, actress
- Instrument: Vocals
- Years active: Since 1984

Dilnaz Muratkyzy Akhmadieva (Kazakh: Ділназ Мұратқызы Ахмадиева, Dılnaz Mūratqyzy Ahmadieva; born November 20, 1980) is a Kazakhstani pop singer and actress of Uyghur origin, raised in Almaty, Kazakhstan.

== Songs sung by Dilnaz ==
Russian

- Mozhet Odnazhdy
- Mezhdu Nami Zima
- Bez Tebya (featuring Miya)
- Razluka (Russian version of Lara Fabian's Adagio)
- Zolotoi
- Romeo & Juliet

Uyghur

- Bulbul Nawasi
- Ashiq Boldum

Kazakh

- Mama
- Kewil Saginish

English

- Lonely
- Last Dance

== Discography ==
- 2001 Mozhet Odnazhdy
- 2002 Wapadarim
- 2005 Zolotoj
- 2007 My heart
- 2010 Lyubov zadety
- 2014 Dumai obo mne
- 2015 Koz aldimda

== Filmography ==
- Nomad (2006)
