= Cimbrian seeresses =

Priestesses of the Cimbri

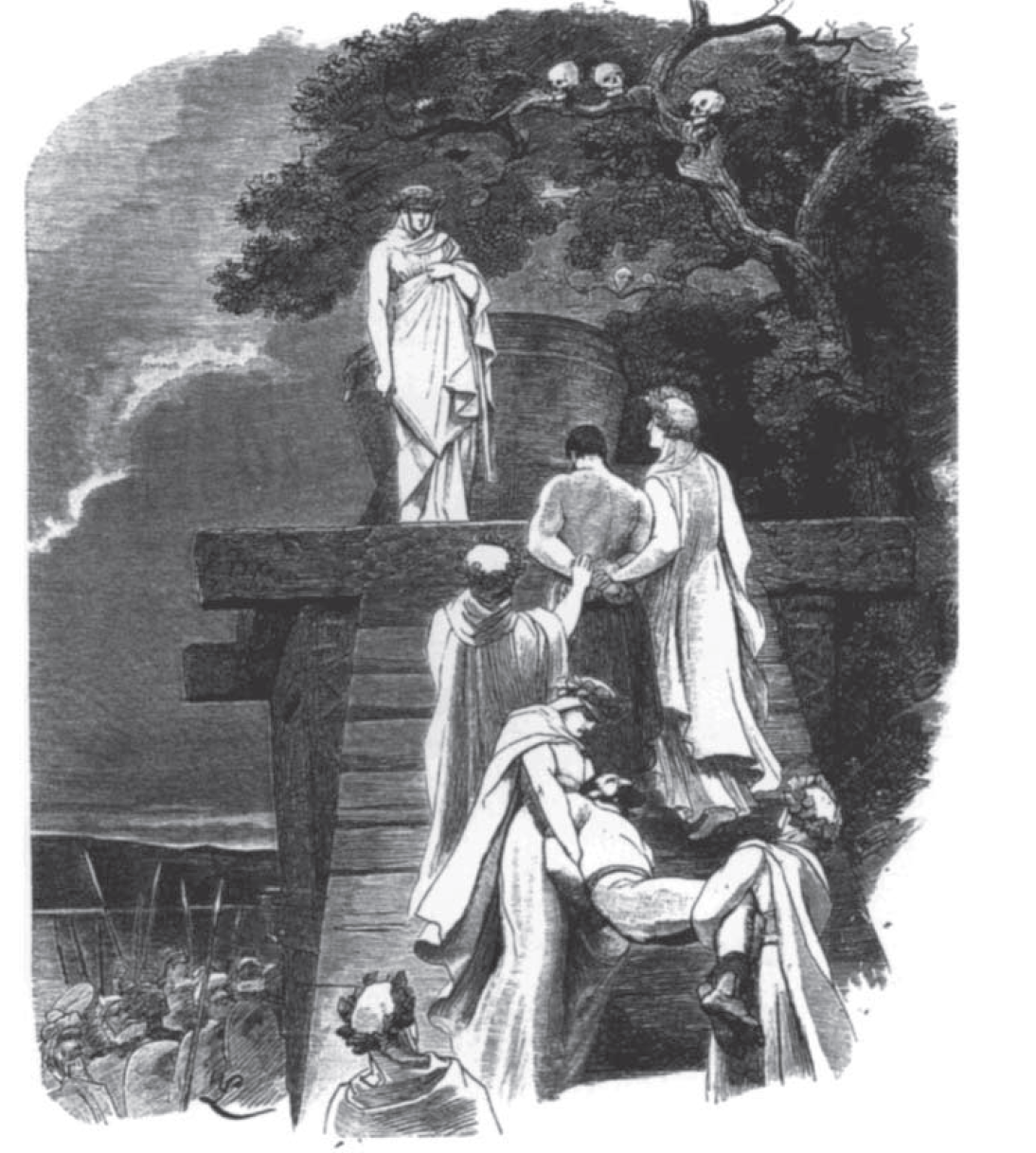
Illustration from 1890

The Cimbrian seeresses were priestesses of the Cimbri. The people they belonged to appears to have been a Germanic tribe that became a Celto-Germanic federation during its migrations from southern Scandinavia into southern Europe where they were annihilated by the Romans. The priestesses are mentioned in Strabo's Geographica concerning sacrifices performed after a victory towards the end of the 2nd century BC. The account tells that the seeresses led prisoners of war up a platform where they cut their throats and watching the blood stream down into a cauldron they made predictions about the future. They also cut up their bellies and studied their entrails.

They are compared by scholars with attestations of similar customs among Celts and Germans, involving cauldrons, platforms and divinations from blood and entrails, and there are also supporting finds in archaeology. Some scholars consider the account to have been fabricated based on traumatic memories of Germanic customs by Roman legionaries and knowledge about the seeresses among Germanic tribes. Memories of such practices performed by pagan priestesses, Valkyrie women, may have contributed to the demonization that Christian scribes targeted towards female ritual practitioners after Christianization.

== Background ==
The migrations of the Teutons and the Cimbri. Cimbri, Ambrone and Teuton defeats. Cimbri, Ambrone and Teuton victories.

What may be the earliest mention of Germanic seeresses is in a fragment attributed to Posidonius (c. 135 BC - 51/50 BC). However, it is not clear whether the priestesses' tribe, the Cimbri, were Celtic or Germanic, or a Celto-Germanic alliance, but the Romans considered them Germanic. Their origin was probably in a Germanic speaking territory which is identified by the name Himmerland (Old Danish: Himbersysel), and in the ethnonym Κιμβροι which was placed in Jutland in Ptolemy's Geography. The name may originally have meant 'shining' and referred to a body of water in Himmerland. Their southward migrations and a number of notable conflicts in the end of the 2nd century BC, brought them into the spheres of Greek and Roman historians. Some of them, e.g. Appian in Civil Wars, classed them as "Celts" while others, such as Caesar (De Bello Gallico) and Tacitus (Germania (37) identified them as Germans, but this mainly meant that they came from east of the Rhine, which did not automatically mean they spoke Germanic. The few "Cimbri" names and words recorded by the Romans were all Celtic except for the ethnonym Cimbri itself. The Celtic speakers in the horde would likely have said *khimbroi or later *khimbri when they pronounced a Germanic *χimbriz, which suggests that the Romans learnt of the name from Celtic speakers.

During their migrations across Europe the Cimbri were in contact with several Celtic speaking ethnic groups, such as the Taurisci, Boii, Volcae Tectosages and the Scordisci. Consequently, they are widely considered to have been a horde with a mix of languages when they were destroyed by the Romans at Vercellae in 102 or 101 BC. At this time, the Romans had many years of close experience with Celtic speakers in Northern Italy (Cisalpine Gaul), Southern France (Gallia Narbonensis) and in Noricum, and so there probably many among them who were bilingual in Latin and Celtic. The Romans had little experience with Germans, however, and so the Celtic speakers among the Cimbri were in a better position to communicate with the Romans than were the Germans who only knew their own language.

The migration of the Cimbri was the first known Germanic migration into Celtic territory and it was a precursor of a "seemingly limitless outpouring" of Germanic tribes from Northern Europe pushing south and west in search of new lands, and the Celts were caught between them and the Romans. The result is that what today is Germany changed from a Celtic-speaking territory to a Germanic-speaking one. Julius Caesar may have been correct when he said that Gaul (modern France) had to be conquered by the Romans or it would have become Germanic.

== Account ==
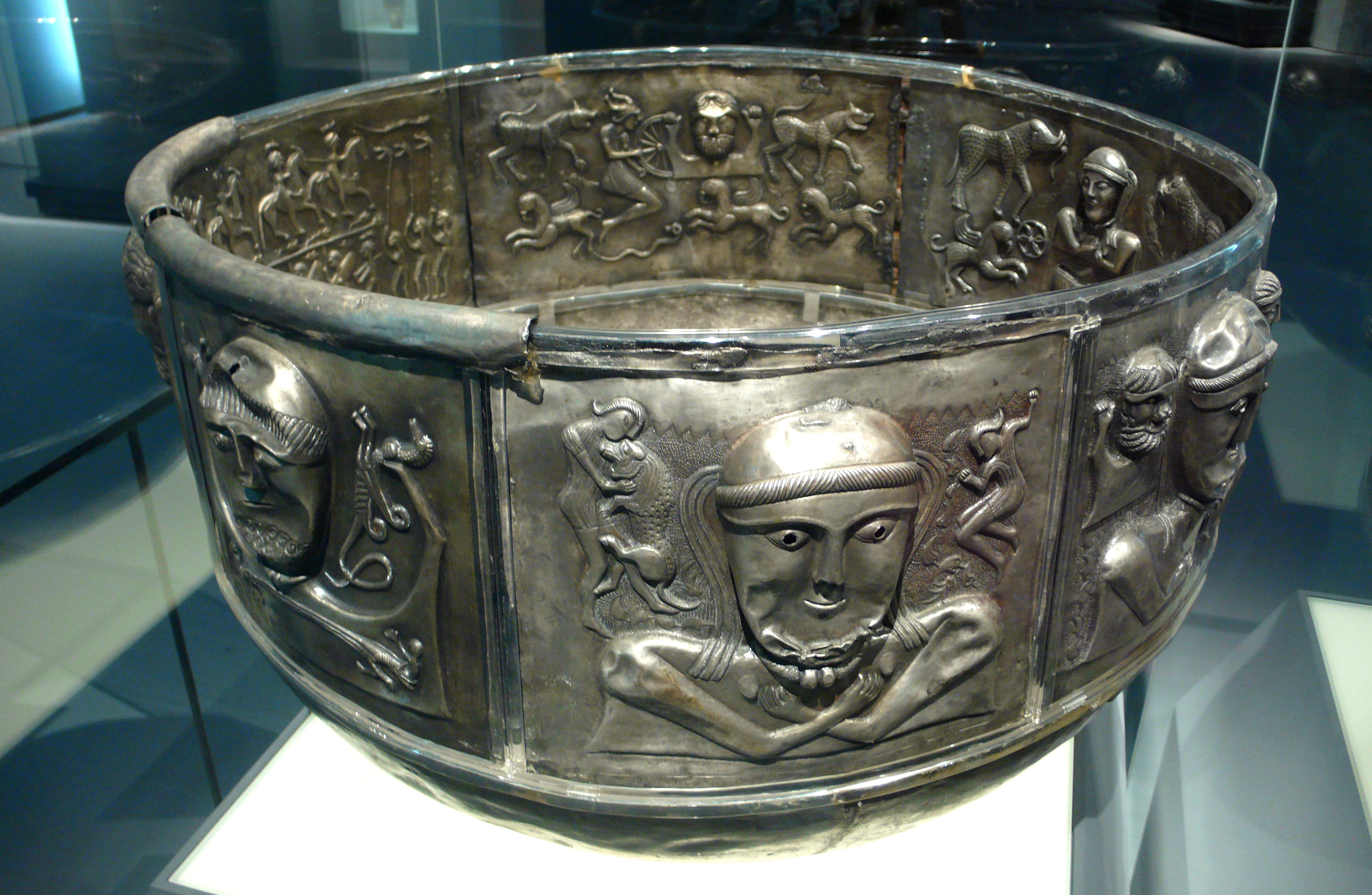
The Gundestrup silver bowl may have served in such a rite.

Strabo relates that the Cimbri were accompanied by their wives who were attended by prophesying priestesses (προμάντεισ ἱέρειαι). These grey-haired seeresses walked barefoot and were dressed in white. They crowned the war prisoners with wreathes, and led them to a big cauldron over which there was a wooden platform. They positioned the prisoner above the cauldron and a priestess slit his throat. Watching how his blood streamed down into the cauldron, or studying his entrails, she made a prophecy about the next battle.

ἔθος δέ τι τῶν Κίμβρων διηγοῦνται τοιοῦτον, ὅτι ταῖς γυναιξὶν αὐτῶν συστρατευούσαις παρηκολούθουν προμάντεις ἱέρειαι πολιότριχες, λευχείμονες, καρπασίνας ἐφαπτίδας ἐπιπεπορπημέναι, ζῶσμα χαλκοῦν ἔχουσαι, γυμνόποδες: τοῖς οὖν αἰχμαλώτοις διὰ τοῦ στρατοπέδου συνήντων ξιφήρεις, καταστέψασαι δ᾽ αὐτοὺς ἦγον ἐπὶ κρατῆρα χαλκοῦν ὅσον ἀμφορέων εἴκοσιν: εἶχον δὲ ἀναβάθραν, ἣν ἀναβᾶσα ὑπερπετὴς τοῦ λέβητος ἐλαιμοτόμει ἕκαστον μετεωρισθέντα: ἐκ δὲ τοῦ προχεομένου αἵματος εἰς τὸν κρατῆρα μαντείαν τινὰ ἐποιοῦντο, ἄλλαι δὲ διασχίσασαι ἐσπλάγχνευον ἀναφθεγγόμεναι νίκην τοῖς οἰκείοις. ἐν δὲ τοῖς ἀγῶσιν ἔτυπτον τὰς βύρσας τὰς περιτεταμένας τοῖς γέρροις τῶν ἁρμαμαξῶν, ὥστ᾽ ἀποτελεῖσθαι ψόφον ἐξαίσιον. (Strabo, Geographica 7.2.3).

They describe a certain custom of the Kimbrians, that the women join the expeditions, attended by priestesses who were prophets, greyhaired and dressed in white, with flaxen cloaks buckled on and having bronze girdles and bare feet. With their swords, they would meet captives throughout the camp, and crowning them with wreaths they would lead them to a bronze krater holding about twenty amphoras. They would go up a flight of stairs, each would be lifted over the cauldron, and his throat would be cut after he was raised up . Some would make a certain prophecy from the blood that poured forth into the krater, and others would split them open and examine their entrails, crying out victory for their people. During the battles they would strike the hides that were stretched over the wicker bodies of their wagons, creating an extraordinary noise. (Roller's translation).

=== Criticism ===
The account is usually attributed to Posidonius who travelled in Transalpine Gaul, where some decades earlier the Cimbri had migrated until they were annihilated by the consul Marius at Vercellae in 101 BC. Posidonius did not travel as a politician nor a general, but as an ethnographer, and so he would not have been biassed against the Cimbri. It has consequently been considered as an important sources for the Germanic seeresses. However, later scholars have cast doubt on the attribution to Posidonius, arguing that Strabo does not explicitly state that the information came from Posidonius. Usually he attributes excerpts from Posidonius with Ποςειδώνιος λέγει/φήσι, but here he says δ[ι]ηγούνται ("they say") instead, and so it appears to be from other sources, and it may be an anecdote he heard while travelling. Consequently, a scholar has dismissed it as mere "hearsay" and "[...] exactly the kind of anecdote which would be common currency in Rome". Without an explicit attribution to Posidonius it does not have the same credibility as a trustworthy account of Germanic seeresses, and it may better represent the barbaric customs that the Romans attributed to the Germanic tribes when they waged war. The wars with the Cimbri had horrified the Romans so much that Caesar very often reminded the readers of De Bello Gallico that his war in Gaul was justified because of the Germanic threat from east of the Rhine.

Simek suggests that the account is the result of the traumatic memories of Roman legionaries from interactions with the Cimbri a century earlier, the knowledge that the Germanic tribes had seeresses and the customs of divination in the state cult of Rome.

== Cauldrons and platforms ==
The account by Strabo is very similar to one of the scenes depicted on the Gundestrup cauldron, which was found in the Scandinavian homeland of the Cimbri, Himmerland. It was manufactured by Celts, probably in modern-day France, in the 1st or 2nd century BC, and it may in fact have served as a receptacle in such a rite. de Vries considers the account to be a representation of a Celtic ritual, but it is likely that the Germanic tribes of the time had similar, and probably related rites. In fact, this sacrificial object may have been imported to Jutland because the Germanic population of the area were not very different from the Celts in religious matters, which was pointed out by Strabo in Geography, 7.1.2., or Celtic religious customs were easily understood. Many other Celtic objects were imported by Germanic tribes at the time. Strabo also wrote that the remaining Cimbri in the North had gifted a revered holy silver cauldron to the Roman emperor Augustus, as a sign of their friendship.

=== The Vix burial ===
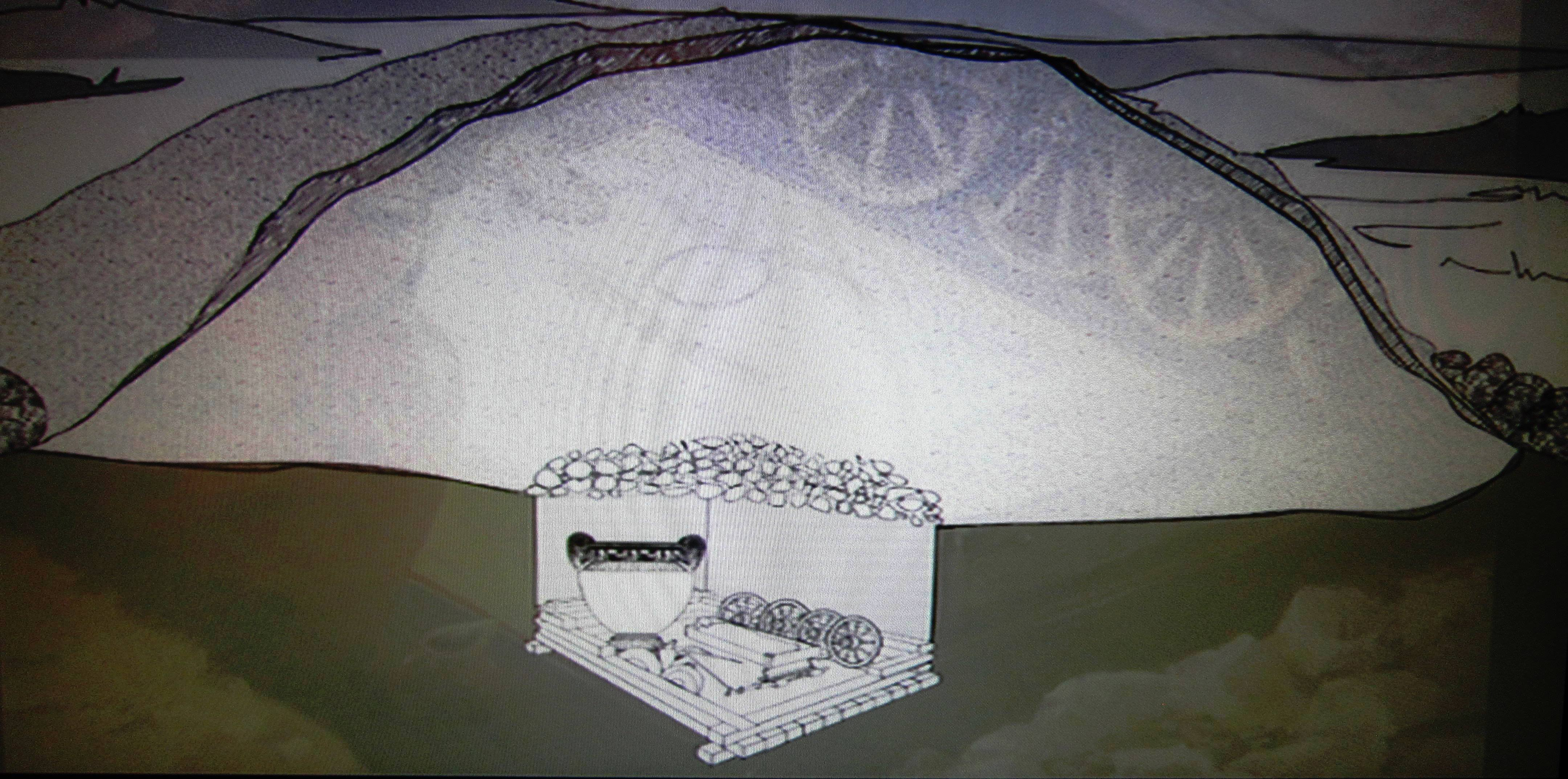
The Vix Grave.

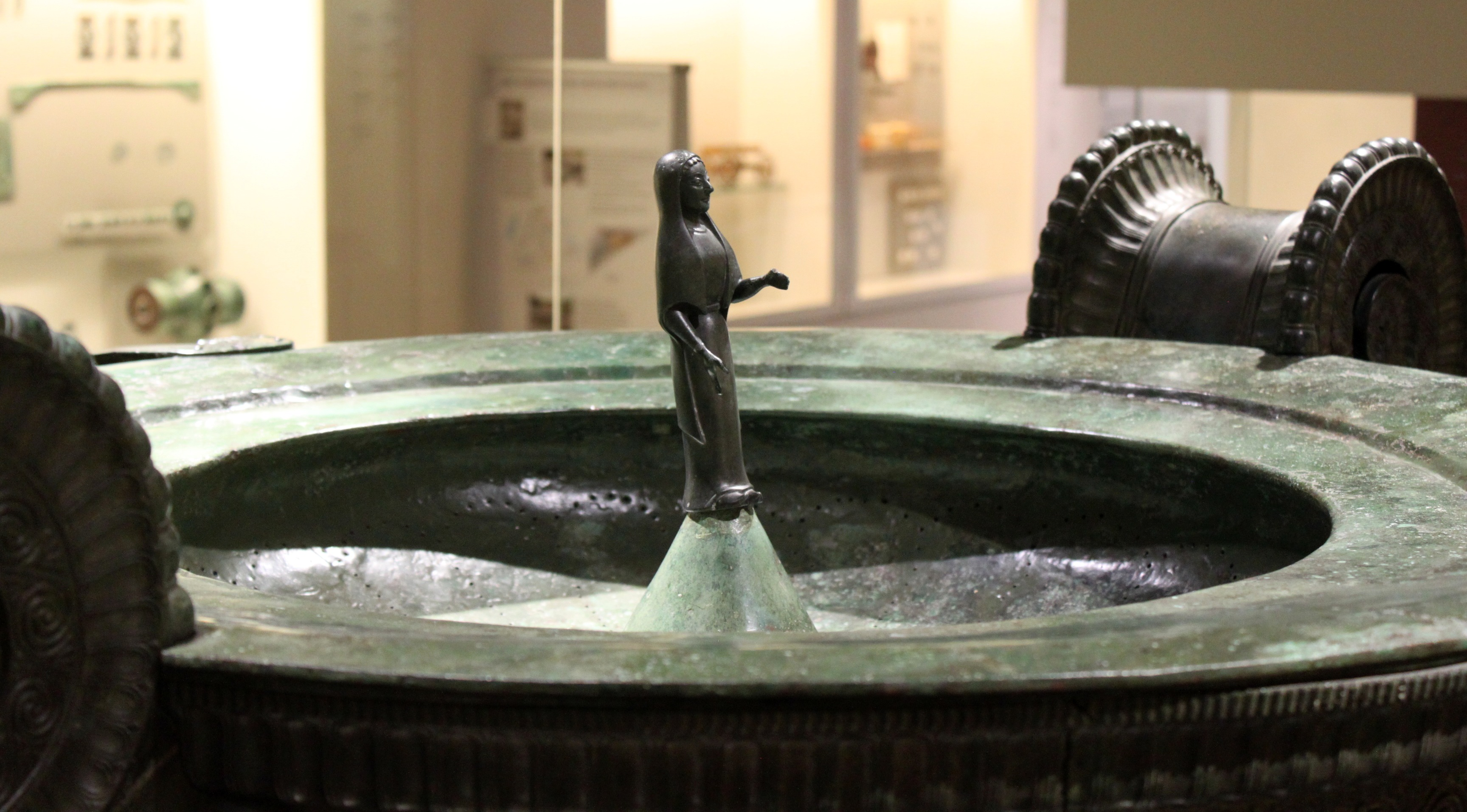
The seeress on the lid of the krater.

The cauldrons used by the Cimbri priestesses have been compared to an enormous cauldron that was found in a rich Celtic female waggon burial, the Vix Grave, from the 6th century BC. The woman was around 35 when she died and she had been buried with a great deal of honours and riches. It was a krater which in Greece would have been used for mixing water and wine, and several vessels imported from Greece have been found in Celtic graves, but its size stands out. It was 1.64 m tall, weighed 208 kg, and would have held 1200 L of liquid. It was too large to have been practical for use in serving drinks at feasts and would not have been easy to transport. Its frieze was decorated with warriors, and on the lid was a woman who looked like a seeress with a veil over her head and shoulders, and who had one arm outstretched. The other vessels in the grave were not those used for serving drinks at feasts, but those that would have been used in ceremonial rites for dispensing liquids. It has been proposed by the French scholar Bourriot (1965) that it was a cauldron used for holding blood in the same type of rites as those performed by the Cimbri priestesses. The fact that the Vix lady was young while the Cimbri priestesses were described as "grey-haired" may be explained by the original Greek term πολιότριχες, usually translated as "grey-haired", having an alternate (and original) meaning of "pale-haired", i.e. the hair color known as ash- or platinum-blonde in English, which is (and probably always was) extremely rare except around the Baltic sea. The krater probably belonged to a shrine on Mount Lassois near the burial. The warriors, the chariots, the gorgon head, and the seeress figure on the lid, all point to the krater having been made as an offering to a war god and his priestess.

=== Suebi ===
A very large barrel that was similar to the cauldron of the Cimbri priestesses is attested from the Suebi of Bregenz in Austria c. 611. It could hold 26 measures of ale and it was used in sacrifices to Wodan (Odin) which implies that it was used for human sacrifices. The legend tells that St Columbanus unfastened its metal hoops.

=== Scandinavia ===
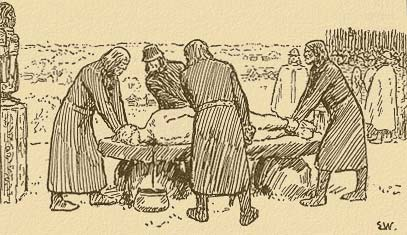
The sacrifice of the Swedish king Domalde, throat cut and blood pouring into a vessel.

There are similar accounts in the mediaeval Scandinavian sources, such as Gesta Danorum (I, 27) and Ynglinga saga (XI), where an early king of Sweden, Fjölnir (or Hundingus), drowns in an enormous vat of beer. Hymiskviða involves cauldrons and prophesying by studying blood (see below), as does the Prose Edda, where Kvasir dies into the vessel as his blood is poured into it, and in it the blood turns into the "poet's mead". The cauldrons of the Cimbrian priestesses agree with what was called hlautbolli in Old Norse. In Kjalnesinga saga, the hlautbolli 'sacrificial bowl' is described as a large copper bowl. It was a vessel used in pagan Scandinavian ceremonies where human or animal sacrificial blood was collected, and they were placed on special platforms called stallar. The participants drank some of the blood. The rest was splattered with a twig on the walls and the participants, like holy water, and in the English word bless originates in this practice of sprinkling a person with blood, bleodsian. As the Swedes were the most resistant to conversion to Christianity and held on to their old beliefs the longest, the Icelanders mocked them by saying that the Swedes licked their sacrificial bowls.

The platforms, stallar, on which the sacrificial bowls were placed, were likely also used for divinations performed by cultic leaders during the sacrifices. Such rites were performed to acquire guidance from the gods when the people had to deal with dangerous situations. The divinatory sacrifices were provided legitimacy from the gods for the leaders' decisions.

== Divination by sacrifice ==
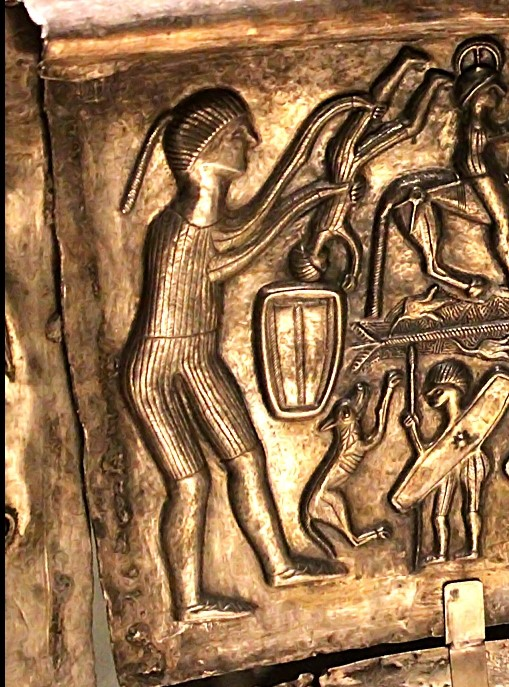
A sacrificial rite involving a cauldron on the one from Gundestrup.

Germanic and Celtic tribes were infamous for their cruel executions of war prisoners, and literary sources point to divination having been the main reason. Posidonus writes that the Celts used to kill their prisoners in a way so that they could observe and predict the future from the convulsions of the dying, which Davidson compares to the divination performed by the Cimbri priestesses, who studied the flow of blood from the throats of the prisoners.

In early 539, when Theudebert had entered Liguria, the Goths who were settled in Pavia believed that the Franks were there to assist them and offered no resistance, but Theudebert betrayed them and slaughtered them. In spite of the fact that the Franks had converted to Christianity it is reported that after having taken over a bridge, they killed all the Gothic women and children they found and threw them into the river as the first casualties of war, because they still preserved their pagan traditions to predict the future based on human sacrifice.

=== Divination by blood ===
Davidson compares the seeresses to a report by Tacitus who wrote in Annals XXX, 30, that the Celts in Britain under Boudica used to "drench their altars in the blood of prisoners and consult their god by means of human sacrifice". The Roman general Suetonius Paulinus conquered the island and cut down the sacred grove on the island of Anglesey to stop the religious practices:

Afterwards he imposed a garrison on the defeated and chopped down their groves, devoted to savage superstitions: they considered it right (fas) to make burnt offerings at altars with captive gore and to consult the gods using men’s innards. (Tacitus)

Sundqvist argues that the blood was used for divination also by later pagan North Germanic peoples. However, Schjødt writes that after the Cimbric seeresses, there is no firm evidence for prophesying by observing blood in northern Europe, but he adds that blood was such an important component in Scandinavian pagan sacrifices that victims being sacrificed should have provided signs from which divination was performed. He notes that in Landnámabók, it is reported that Ingolfr performed a great sacrifice (blót) to find out about his future, and he was informed that he should settle in Iceland. It is not specified how the divination was performed but the fact that it was combined with sacrifice indicates the use of the blood that was produced. Also Hymiskviða, stanza 1, is compared with the Cimbric seeresses by scholars to illustrate that pagan Scandinavian priests also prophesied by using blood. Bellows comments that in the stanza the gods sprinkle blood and use magic to find out where to find more to drink, and they learn that they will find it in Ægir's hall:

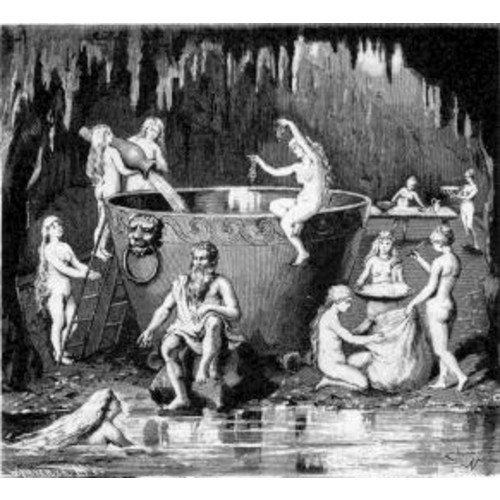
Ægir, Rán and their Nine Daughters prepare a huge vat of ale. 19th-century Swedish book illustration of the Poetic Edda.

Of old the gods made feast together,
And drink they sought ere sated they were;
Twigs they shook, and blood they tried:
Rich fare in Ægir's hall they found.

Archaeological finds from Iceland have shown that cattle were sacrificed in a way that would have produced a "fountain of blood because the heart was still beating as the head came off". In fact Adam of Bremen's account of the pagan sacrifices at the Temple at Uppsala in Sweden only mentions that nine heads of sacrificed people and animals “The sacrifice is of this nature: of every living thing that is male, they offer nine heads.” Also during an excavation at Frösön ('the island of the god Freyr') in Sweden, they found mainly the bones from the heads of animals around what used to be a sacrificial tree. Also at Borg in Östergötland a cultic site gave 98 temple rings and 75 kg of unburnt bones, most skulls and jaws. This suggests that the finds are from blood rituals like those found in Old Norse sagas.

Scholars such as de Vries, Drobin and Sundqvist note that the blood served as a sacred communion between men and gods, and the blood was sprinkled on ritual objects and walls. The blood also had a symbolic relation with the mead which was consumed by the worshippers, and both were used as intermediaries for divination.

Fleck comments that in the Prose Edda, there is a symbolic presentation of a blood sacrifice in a vessel. Kvasir's body has little importance and he dies into the vessel as his blood is poured into it, and in it the blood turns into the "Mead of poetry". Kvasir's blood was consequently the source of the runes, since it was identical with the mead of poetry.

== Priestesses ==
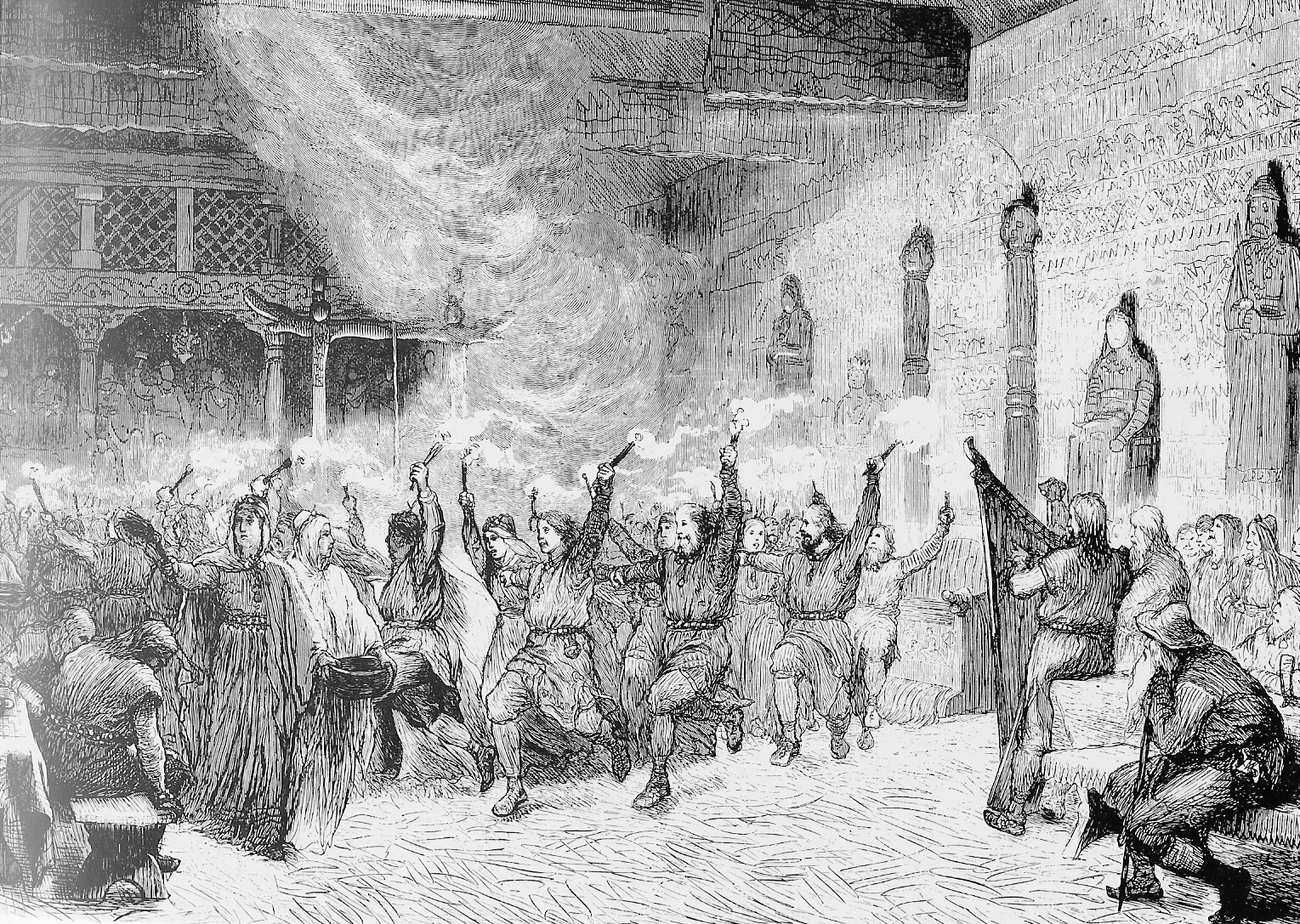
To the left of the picture a priestess sprinkles a participant with blood from the sacrifice. A younger female assistant carries the sacrificial bowl with the blood. An illustration of the great goddess sacrifice at the Temple at Uppsala, in Sweden, by August Malmström.

In Indo-European societies, such as the Celtic and the Germanic, the woman was in charge of the cultivation of the soil and she provided nourishment to the tribe. As a gatherer, she was responsible for healing with plants, but she was also a specialist in poisons. These roles would survive long into the Christian era. Nature's fertility has long been connected to female deities, and the waning and waxing of the moon was associated with her fertility due to her periods. However, the moon was also a symbol of death and the goddesses were usually dualistic. This dualistic nature of the priestess as a symbol of both fertility and death was perpetuated into the witch figure. She could be a healer or a killer, and she could prophesy prosperity or doom.

It has been commented in connection to the Cimbric seeresses that the Germanic women had a monopoly on spontaneous divination which sets them apart from the Mediterranean sybils whose predictions were not accepted unless interpreted by male priests. The Germanic seeresses expressed their prophesies as they wished and did so rationally. Tacitus wrote that the Germanic warriors listened to their women, and considered them to possess prophetic powers, and the Romans discovered that the only way to control the tribesmen was to keep one of their women as hostage.

Reichert writes that there is little evidence of Germanic priestesses from the time of Tacitus to the era of conversion (Njáls saga). If the functions of seeress and priestess are not combined, as in the case of the Cimbrian seeresses, confirmations of such a priestly function have only survived from Iceland, where some of them are named, and from Sweden and Uppsala with its Freyr cult. The existence of temple priestesses among the pagan North Germanic peoples is also evidenced by the ON term hofgyðja 'shrine priestess' and Christian laws prohibiting women from serving as priests in religious ceremonies and in public entertainment with erotic content, because Christianity progressively imposed an exclusively male priesthood. This was one of the most radical changes imposed by the new religion in North Germanic society and which caused a disempowerment of women.

=== Valkyrie women ===
Scholars such as Morris and Orchard compare these priestesses with the Valkyrie figure "Angel of Death" whose rituals were witnessed by the Arab diplomat Ibn Fadlan who encountered Swedish Vikings on the Volga. Neil Price comments that in Arab, she is called Malak al-Mawt, which refers to an angel in the Quran "whose purpose is to choose the dead and take them to their assigned places", and it is probably not coincidental that it is a very close Arab translation of Valkyrie. Morris suggests that the sacrificial priestess, or Valkyrie, witnessed by Ibn Fadlan may have been a later Scandinavian version of the Cimbrian priestesses.

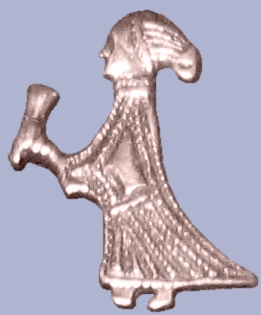
A silver figure of a woman holding a drinking horn found in Birka, Björkö, Uppland, Sweden

Scholars have commented that Ibn Fadlan's account is "sober enough and self-consistent enough to invite consideration as history". The Arab envoy witnessed the ship burial of a Viking chieftain who had been accompanied by an entourage of numerous slave girls and one of them volunteered to follow him into the next life. Many rituals are described, and the Angel of Death is responsible for the costume of the dead chieftain, and for killing the slave girl. "I saw that she was a strapping old woman, fat and louring." She gave an intoxicating beverage to the slave girl and took her into the ship, where six men had sexual intercourse with her, after which she was killed by being strangled and stabbed between the ribs repeatedly. Based on the terminology Ibn Fadlan uses she was probably 14 or 15 years old.

There are parallels with other women offering drinks in Old Norse literature such as Borghild in Völsunga saga who gives ale with poison to her stepson, and Gudrun in Atlamál in grǿnlenzku who serves the Hunnish king Attila a cup that contains the blood of their sons.

Gory pagan rituals such as these were harshly judged when the Germanic cultures had converted to Christianity, and in Wulfstan's 11th century Sermo Lupi he groups Valkyries and witches with murderers and whores.

... and here are harlots and infanticides and many foul adulterous fornicators, and here are witches and valkyries, and here are plunderers and robbers and despoilers, and to sum it up quickly, a countless number of all crimes and misdeeds.

Also in the flyting between Sinfjötli and Gudmund in Helgakviða Hundingsbana I (stanzas 39, 40) Sinfjötli calls him a fearsome Valkyrie and a witch, which shows the literary juxtaposition of Valkyries, witches, murderers and whores, when Christian writers wrote about pagan traditions.
