= Kargaly, Zhambyl District =

Kargaly Қарғалы
- Village
- Location in Kazakhstan
- Coordinates: 43°9′32″N 76°24′41″E
- Country: Kazakhstan
- Region: Almaty Region
- District: Zhambyl District

Population (2009)
  - Total: 20,114
- Time zone: UTC+6 (Omsk Time)
- Postal code: 040616
- Area code: 72770

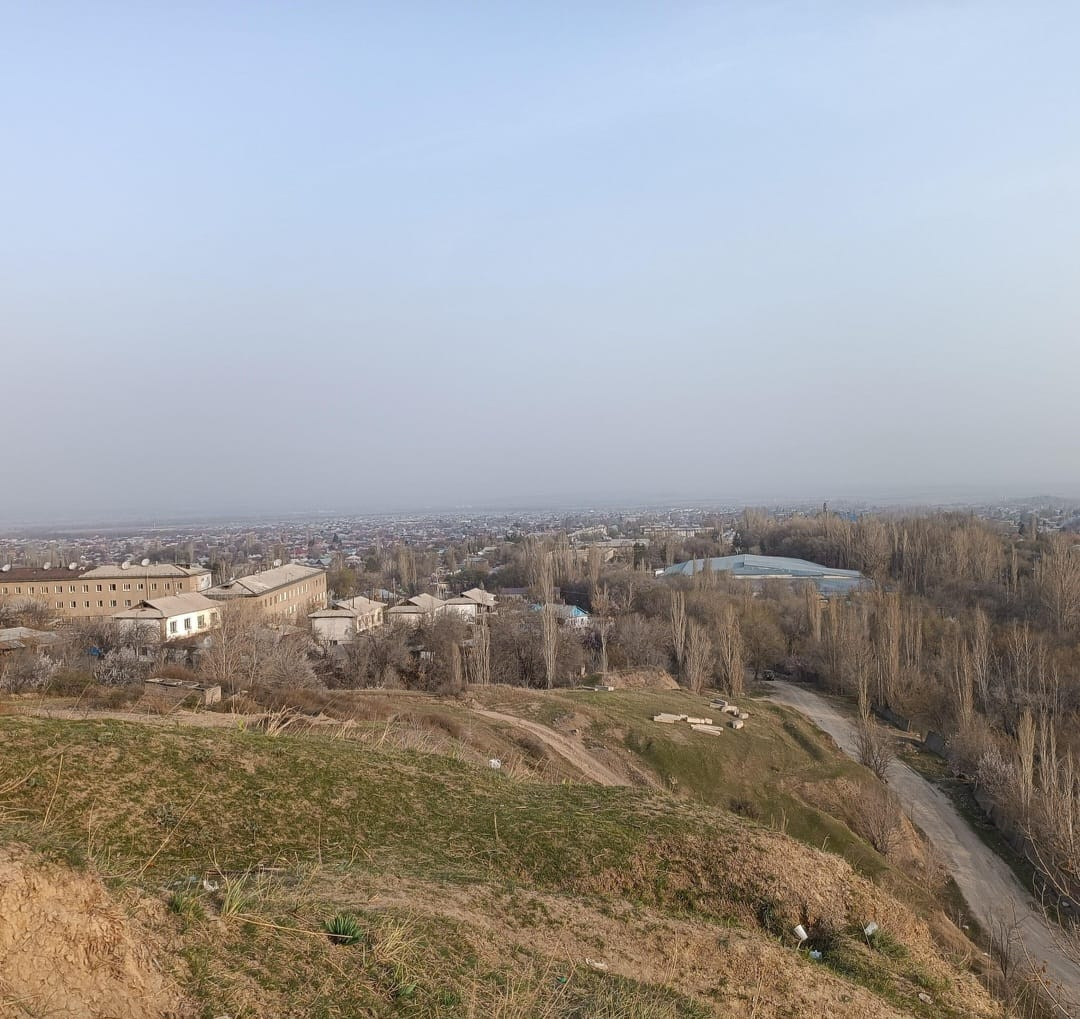
Kargaly

Kargaly (Kazakh: Қарғалы, romanized: Qarğaly, formerly Fabrichnyy) is a village in the Almaty Region of south-eastern Kazakhstan.
