= Zhambyl District, Almaty Region =

Coordinates: 43.2234°N 76.313°E

Zhambyl
- District
- Жамбыл ауданы
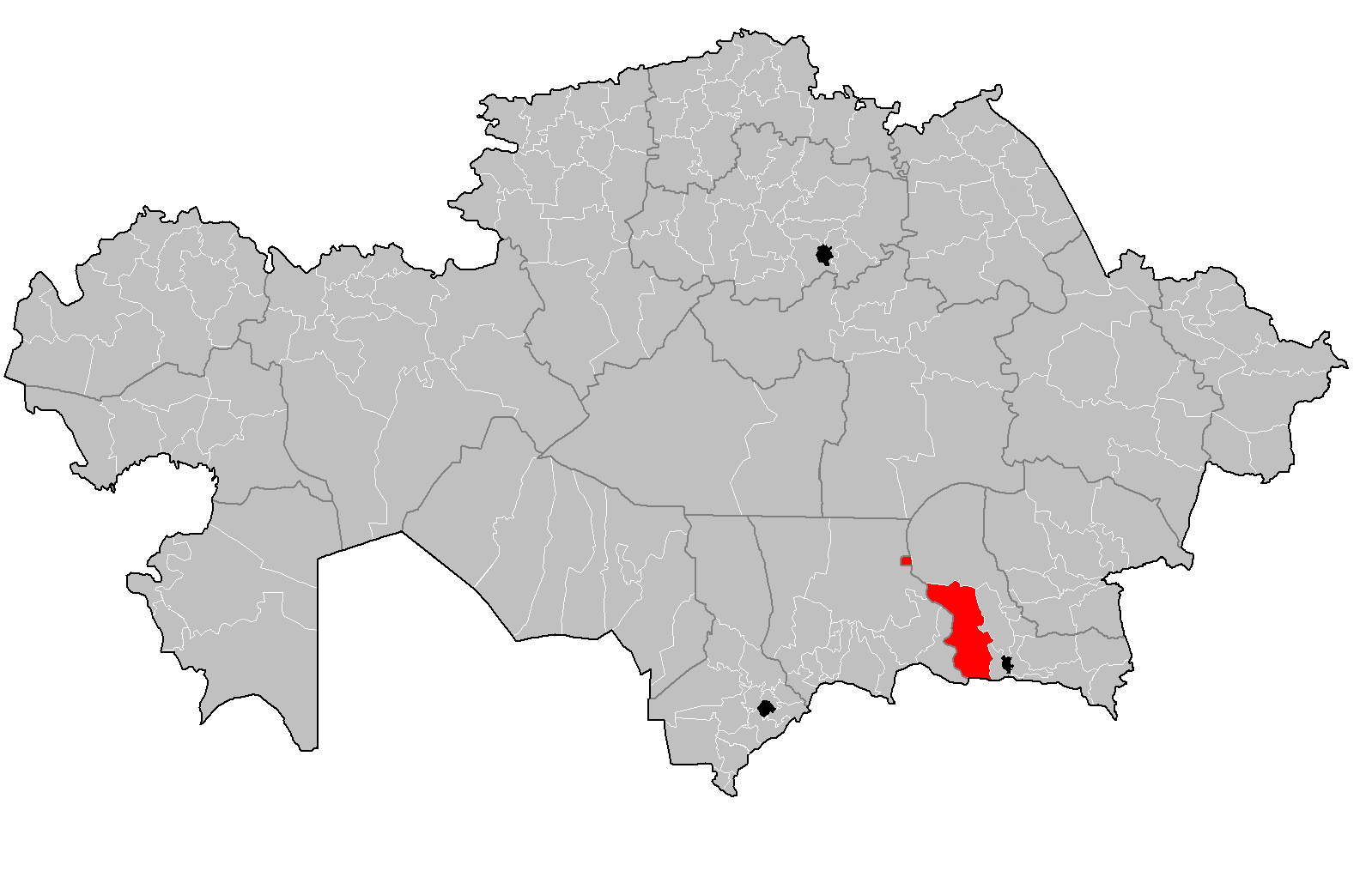
- Country: Kazakhstan
- Region: Almaty Region
- Administrative center: Uzynagash

Government
  - Akim (mayor): Ertas Nurlan Ertasovich

Area
  - Total: 7,500 sq mi (19,300 km^{2})

Population (2013)
  - Total: 137,129
- Time zone: UTC+6 (East)

Zhambyl District (Kazakh: Жамбыл ауданы, Jambyl audany) is a district of Almaty Region in Kazakhstan. The administrative center of the district is the selo of Uzynagash. Population: 137,129 (2013 estimate); 117,599 (2009 census results); 105,895 (1999 census results). The district is named after Zhambyl Zhabayev, who was a Soviet and Kazakh poet, who won the Stalin Prize of the second degree in 1941. People often confuse with Zhambyl region, however these are two different terms.

== See also ==
- Otar Military Base
