= Novoukrainka (disambiguation) =

Novoukrainka is a city in Kirovohrad Oblast, Ukraine. Novoukrainka (Ukrainian: Новоукраїнка) may also refer to other settlements:

== Ukraine ==
- Novoukrainka, Pokrovsk Raion, Donetsk Oblast
- Novoukrainka, Zolotonosha Raion, Cherkasy Oblast
- Novoukrainka, Vuhledar urban hromada, Volnovakha Raion, Donetsk Oblast
- The former name of Variazh, Lviv Oblast, Ukraine

== Russia ==
- Novoukrainka, Republic of Bashkortostan
