= Forward, for the Hetman's Treasures! =

1993 Ukrainian satirical comedy film

- Вперед, за скарбами гетьмана!
- Directed by: Vadym Kastelli
- Written by: Leonid Slutskyi; Vasyl Trubay; Vadym Kastelli
- Starring: Oleksandr Bondarenko; Yuriy Mazhuha; Yuriy Yevsyukov
- Cinematography: Vitaliy Zaporozhchenko
- Music by: Ihor Stetsiuk
- Production company: Dovzhenko Film Studios
- Distributed by: Fest-Zemlya
- Release date: 1993
- Running time: 90 minutes
- Country: Ukraine
- Language: Ukrainian

Forward, for the Hetman's Treasures! (Ukrainian: Вперед, за скарбами гетьмана!, translit. Vpered, za skarbamy hetmana!) is a 1993 Ukrainian satirical comedy film directed by Vadym Kastelli. Produced during the early years of Ukraine's independence, the film is an absurdist political farce that parodies the legend of the Gold of Polubotok.

== Plot ==
The story begins in the 18th century, when the Ukrainian Hetman Pavlo Polubotok sent his son to a British bank with barrels of gold, hoping the treasure would one day aid a free Ukraine. He entrusted his son with a secret code to the deposit.

In 1993, shortly after the Declaration of Independence of Ukraine, the Hetman's descendant—also named Ivan Polubotok—becomes a target for various international and domestic intelligence agencies. Ivan, an unassuming villager involved in the honey trade, is oblivious to his heritage. However, the KGB, foreign spies, and local political factions are convinced he knows the secret bank code.

Pursued by the mysterious "Man in Black" and other agents, Ivan travels from his village to Kyiv. Along the way, he encounters a series of surreal obstacles: a secret meeting of communists who dream of monetizing Lenin monuments, an attempt by a spy named Zhannochka to entrap him, and the magical assistance of a local witch, Odarka. The journey culminates in London, where Ivan must navigate a chaotic struggle for the gold, involving caricatured versions of contemporary political leaders.

== Cast ==
- Oleksandr Bondarenko as Ivan Polubotok
- Yuriy Mazhuha as General Felix
- Yuriy Yevsyukov as the "Man in Black" (KGB Agent)
- Natalia Sumska as Zhannochka

== Production and legacy ==
The film was the directorial debut of Vadym Kastelli and was produced at the Dovzhenko Film Studios. It is recognized as one of the first major political satires of independent Ukraine. According to the Dovzhenko Centre, the film utilizes "grotesque" humor to reflect the "spy mania" and social uncertainty of the post-Soviet transition in the early 1990s.

The film parodies the widespread public hope that the legendary gold of Polubotok would resolve the nation's economic crises, a theme that has given it cult status in Ukrainian cinema history.
