= Marianivka, Zolotonosha Raion, Cherkasy Oblast =

Village in Cherkasy Oblast, Ukraine

Marianivka Мар'янівка
- Village
- Location of Marianivka Marianivka (Ukraine)
- Coordinates: 49°45′09″N 32°33′33″E
- Country: Ukraine
- Oblast: Cherkasy Oblast
- Raion: Zolotonosha Raion
- Hromada: Chornobai settlement hromada
- Elevation: 114 m (374 ft)

Population (2001)
  - Total: 117
- Postal code: 19922
- Climate: Cfa

Marianivka (Ukrainian: Мар'я́нівка) is a village in Zolotonosha Raion, Cherkasy Oblast, Ukraine. It belongs to Chornobai settlement hromada, one of the hromadas of Ukraine.

Until 18 July 2020, Marianivka was previously located in the Chornobai Raion. The raion was abolished in July 2020 as part of the administrative reform of Ukraine, which reduced the number of raions of Cherkasy Oblast to four. The area of Chornobai Raion was merged into Zolotonosha Raion.

== Population ==
=== Language ===
Distribution of the population by native language according to the 2001 census:

Language	Number	Percentage
Ukrainian	111	94.87%
Armenian	4	3.42%
Other (Note: Those who did not indicate their native language or indicated a language that was native to less than 1% of the local population.)	2	1.71%
Total	117	100.00%
