= Krasenivka =

Rural locality in Cherkasy Oblast, Ukraine

Krasenivka Красенівка
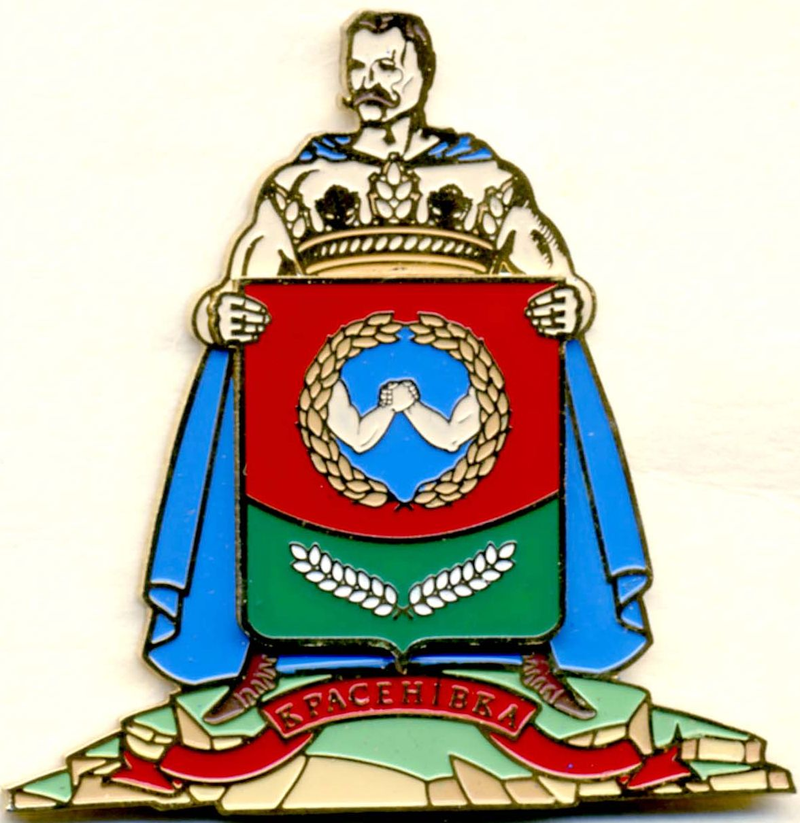
- Coat of arms

- Location in Cherkasy Oblast
- Coordinates: 49°49′13″N 32°23′18″E
- Country: Ukraine
- Oblast: Cherkasy Oblast
- Raion: Zolotonosha Raion
- Hromada: Chornobai settlement hromada
- Time zone: UTC+2 (EET)
  - Summer (DST): UTC+3 (EEST)
- Postal code: 19910

Krasenivka (Ukrainian: Красенівка) is a village in the Chornobai settlement hromada of the Zolotonosha Raion of Cherkasy Oblast in Ukraine.

== History ==
The first written mention of the village was in 1767.

On 19 July 2020, as a result of the administrative-territorial reform and liquidation of the Chornobai Raion, the village became part of the Zolotonosha Raion.

== Notable residents ==
- Ivan Piddubnyi (1871–1949), Ukrainian wrestler, six-time world champion in wrestling
