= Ivan Poddubny =

Ukrainian wrestler (1871–1949)

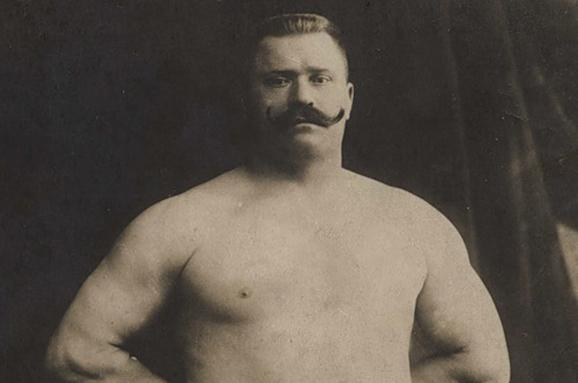

Personal information
- Born: 8 October 1871 Krasenivka, Zolotonoshsky Uyezd, Poltava Governorate, Russian Empire
- Died: 8 August 1949 (aged 77) Yeysk, Krasnodar Krai, Russian SFSR, Soviet Union
- Spouses: Antonina Kvitko-Khomenko (1909–20); Mariya Mashoshyna (1923–49)

Professional wrestling career
- Ring name(s): The Champion of Champions, Ivan the Terrible, The Russian Hercules
- Billed height: 184 cm (6 ft 0 in)
- Billed weight: 120 kg (265 lb)
- Trained by: Eugène de Paris
- Debut: 1896
- Retired: 1941

Signature
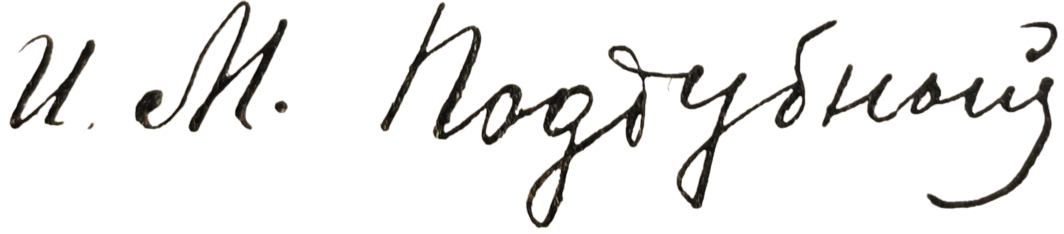

Ivan Maksimovich Poddubny (Russian: Ива́н Максимович Подду́бный; Ukrainian: Іва́н Максимович Підду́бний, romanized: Ivan Maksymovych Piddubnyy; 8 October [O.S. 26 September] 1871 – 8 August 1949) was a professional wrestler from the Russian Empire and Soviet Union.

== Biography ==
Poddubniy was born on John the Apostle day in 1871 into a family of Zaporozhian Cossacks in the village of Krasenivka, in the Zolotonosha county (uyezd) of the Poltava Governorate of the Russian Empire (present-day Zolotonosha Raion of Cherkasy Oblast, Ukraine). Having a big family Poddubny senior had a difficult time to provide for them, therefore Ivan was forced to leave his father's house before turning 20. As a young man, Poddubny worked as a fitter in the ports of Sevastopol and Feodosiya for seven years earning a nickname of Ivan the Great. In Feodosiya, Ivan started to practice with kettlebells and participated in some wrestling fights. Sometime around 1897-1898, he started traveling with circus tours and performed at first in Sevastopol and later in Kiev arenas.

Sometime in 1903, Poddubny joined the Saint Petersburg Athletic Club with which he participated in World Championships in Moscow and Paris. In 1905 he became the World Champion in wrestling in Paris and later toured Italy, Algeria, Belgium, Berlin, winning a championship in Nice. In 1906, Poddubny won two more World Cups in Paris and Milan.

In 1907 Georg Hackenschmidt spots four strong wrestlers: Constant Le Marin, Stanislaus Zbyszko, Ivan Poddubny and Joe Rogers. All four challenge Hackenschmidt, and he agrees to compete the strongest of them, which should determine the tournament. In England, Hackenschmidt attends a match between Zbyszko and Poddubny, which the Zbyszko wins by disqualification.

Before returning to his home in Krasenivka in 1910, he also won several more world cups in Vienna, Paris, and Frankfurt.

Ivan repeatedly won Greco-Roman wrestling "World Cups" among professionals, including the most authoritative of them – in Paris (1905–08). In 1925–27 he performed in Germany and US.

According to the Krasenivka museum, he did not waste his money earned during fights and upon his return home bought 200 ha (490 acres) of land, two houses in a neighboring Bohodukhivka village, a small store, a churn shop, two mills one of which was located in Orzhytsia (today a town in Poltava Oblast). Around that time, he got married for the first time. Sometime in 1913, Poddubny participated in another World Cup in Moscow where he became a runner-up. It was then that his wife left him for another taking his gold medals.

While touring in Rostov, Ivan meet his future second wife whom he married in 1923. In 1920s he was touring the United States staying undefeated while visiting New York City, Los Angeles, Philadelphia, Chicago, San Francisco.

On February 2, 1926 in New York City, Poddubny lost to world heavyweight wrestling champion Joe Stecher, which is considered Poddubny's first loss in 25 years. On June 16, Stecher defeats Poddubny again at the Olympic Auditorium in Los Angeles in front of 10,000 people.

During his tour in the United States he was forced to fight freestyle as his opponents. At age 56 Ivan won a beauty contest among men in the United States. Being unable to take out his earned half a million dollars from the bank (required to be a citizen), he left for home. Later Ivan continued to perform in the Russian circuses retiring finally aged 70. His last farewell performance he did in the Tula city circus in 1941. After his retirement, he with his wife settled in Kuban buying a two-storey house with a garden in Yeysk.

In November 1939, he was given the title of Honored Artist of the RSFSR, and in 1945 that of Honored Master of Sports.

During the Nazi German occupation, he refused to leave the Soviet Union to train German wrestlers.

And the last battle is held at the age of 70. After the end of his career, he moved to the Sea of Azov and lived until his death - 77 years. Poddubny maintained a lifelong professional rivalry with wrestler Stanislaus Zbyszko. He died undefeated on 8 August 1949, in the town of Yeysk, in the Kuban region in Southern Russia from a heart attack. Ivan was buried in Yeysk in a park outside of the city. At his burial site was installed an obelisk that used to say "Here lies the Russian bogatyr".

== Personal life ==
His first wife, Antonina, cheated on him and ran away with another, stealing his gold medals. Antonina later regretted her actions and attempted to return, but Ivan would not forgive her.

According to the director of the Krasenivka museum, Ivan had three sisters (Motrona, Maryna, and Yevdokiya) and three brothers (Omelyan, Mykyta, and Mytrofan). The fate of Omelyan and Mykyta is unknown, while Mytrofan continued to live in Krasenivka where he died in 1966. The last relative of Ivan Poddubny who lived in Krasenivka was his granddaughter Hanna Zakharivna who died sometime before 2011. It is also known that both Motrona and Maryna had three children each, yet the most close relations Ivan kept with his youngest sister Yevdokiya and was as godfather of her daughter Mariya. Eventually, Yevdokiya moved to the neighboring village of Bohodukhivka and later to Zolotonosha.

Ivan's father name was Maksym Ivanovych Poddubny. According to the Krasenivka museum, Ivan Poddubny's height was 180 cm (71 in), his weight was 118 kg (260 lb), his biceps girth was 44 cm (17 in), and his neck was 60 cm (24 in) thick.

Among Poddubny's friends was Dmytro Yavornytsky who lived in Dnipropetrovsk (Yekaterinoslav).

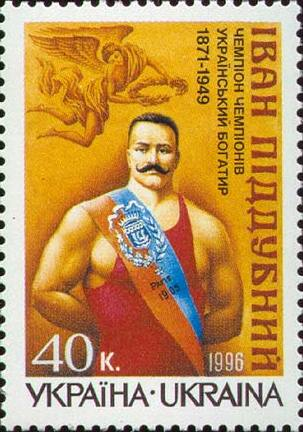
Ukrainian stamp with Poddubny

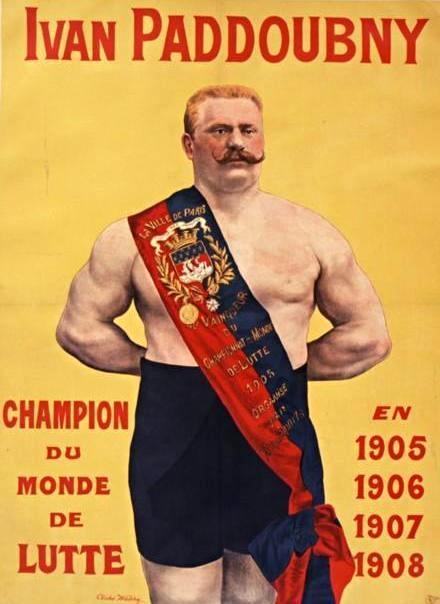

== Championships, accomplishments and awards ==
- Five-time consecutive champion in Greco-Roman wrestling in 1905–1909, the first one to do so.
- Legion of Honour (1911)
- Order of the Red Banner of Labour (1939)
- Honored Artist of the RSFSR (1939)
- Honoured Master of Sports of the USSR (1945)

== Legacy ==
There is a monument dedicated to Poddubny in his home village of Krasenivka. There is also the Ivan Poddubny Fund headed by Petro Dusheiko (former governor of Chornobai Raion). The Fund sponsors the annual festival of bogatyr strength which is conducted since 1998. The festival which gathers up to 10,000 people was visited once by a grandson and great grandson of Ivan Poddubny who arrived from Kazakhstan.

- Piddubny Olympic College, a former Republican Higher School of Physical Culture (in Kyiv) renamed in 2015
