= Blahodatne, Cherkasy Oblast =

Blahodatne Благодатне
- Village
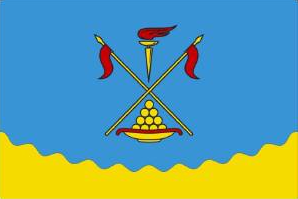
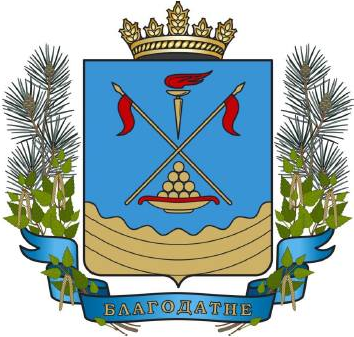
- Flag Coat of arms

- Location in Cherkasy Oblast
- Coordinates: 49°33′N 32°05′E
- Country: Ukraine
- Oblast: Cherkasy Oblast
- Raion: Zolotonosha Raion
- First mentioned: 1619 (as Bohushkova Slobidka)
- Renamed (Soviet occupation): 1923 (as Chapaievka)
- Renamed: 2016 (as Blahodatne)
- Elevation: 82 m (269 ft)

Population (2007)
  - Total: 3,331
- Time zone: UTC+2 (EET)
  - Summer (DST): UTC+3 (EEST)
- Postal code: 19774
- Area code: +380 4737

Blahodatne (Ukrainian: Благодатне) is a selo in Zolotonosha Raion, Cherkasy Oblast, Ukraine. It belongs to Zolotonosha urban hromada, one of the hromadas of Ukraine. Blahodatne has a population of 3,331.

== History ==
The first mention of the village, which was called Bohushkova Slobidka, refers to 1619. In the 17th century, the village was the center of the company (sotnia) of the Kropyvna and, later, Pereyaslav regiments (polki). Note: sotnias and polki were military and administrative divisions of the Cossack Hetmanate. The Cossacks of Bohushkova Slobidka participated in the national liberation war of the middle of the 17th century. In 1666, the village became the center of the anti-Briukovetsky mutiny of the Pereyaslav regiment.

At the end of the 18th century, the village had 285 homesteads with a population of 850 inhabitants, and by the beginning of the 20th century, 737 homesteads with 3907 inhabitants. There were 3 blacksmith shops, 34 windmills, 4 creameries, and several other shops.

In 1920, during the Ukrainian War of Independence, regiments of the Red Army 25th Rifle Division, which was led by Chapayev, stopped in the village for a short rest. This became the basis for renaming the village to Chapayevka (Ukrainian: Чапаєвка) in 1923.

In 1929, a local kolkhoz was formed and named after Chapayev. In the 1930s, a typical high school building was built, a 400-seat House of Culture, and a House of Pioneers (a scaled-down variation of the Palace of Pioneers) was opened.

On June 7, 1936, the first rural stadium in the republic for 5,000 spectators was inaugurated, where all-Ukrainian sports competitions among rural athletes were held. The village also fielded own football team in the 1936 Soviet Cup. According to the Russian football journalist Aksel Vartanyan, the collective farm budget at that time was around 1,300,000 Soviet rubles.

Following the construction of the Kremenchuk Hydroelectric Power Plant and filling of the Kremenchuk reservoir in 1959, the village became a coastal settlement. The villages Velyki Lypski, Mali Lypski, and Zalizky, which were located in the original flood valley and between Chapaievka and Dnieper, were flooded completely.

On 21 May 2016, Verkhovna Rada adopted a decision to rename Chapaievka to Blahodatne, which followed the law prohibiting the glorification of the communist regime.

== Population ==
=== Language ===
Distribution of the population by native language according to the 2001 census:

| Language | Number | Percentage |
|---|---|---|
| Ukrainian | 2 931 | 92.52% |
| Russian | 211 | 6.66% |
| Other (Note: Those who did not indicate their native language or indicated a language that was native to less than 1% of the local population.) | 26 | 0.82% |
| Total | 3 168 | 100.00% |
