= Zolotonosha urban hromada =

Administrative unit in Cherkasy Oblast, Ukraine

Coordinates: 49°36′N 32°06′E

Zolotonosha urban hromada is a hromada of Ukraine, in Zolotonosha Raion, Cherkasy Oblast. Its administrative center is the city of Zolotonosha. It was formed by the government of Ukraine on 12 June 2020. Its area is 465.5 km^{2}, and its population is 35666 (as of 2020), 27664 of which lived in cities, and 8002 lived in rural areas. Current population is 34,914 (2022 estimate)

Until 18 July, 2020, the hromada belonged to Zolotonosha Municipality. As part of the administrative reform of Ukraine, which reduced the number of raions of Cherkasy Oblast to four, the municipality was merged into the Zolotonosha Raion.

The hromada contains the Zolotonosha city council and five village councils: Blahodatnivska, Denhivska, Korobivska, Kropyvnianska, and Krupska.

== Composition ==
The hromada contains 15 settlements: 1 city (Zolotonosha), 3 rural settlements (Hryshkivka, Snihurivka, and Yarky), and 11 villages:

- Blahodatne
- Denhy
- Zhar
- Kedyna Hora
- Komarivka
- Korobivka
- Kropyvna
- Maliivka
- Khvylovo-Sorochyn
- Shcherbynivka
