= Aleksei Barannikov =

Aleksei Barannikov may refer to:

- Aleksei Barannikov (skier)
- Aleksei Barannikov (linguist)
