= Novoukrainka, Zolotonosha Raion, Cherkasy Oblast =

Village in Cherkasy Oblast, Ukraine

Coordinates: 49.5901°N 32.4714°E

Novoukrainka (Ukrainian: Новоукраїнка) is a village in Zolotonosha Raion, Cherkasy Oblast, Ukraine. The village is north of the Dnipro River, and has a post office, a football/soccer field, and the Kovrai river runs through it. It belongs to Chornobai settlement hromada, one of the hromadas of Ukraine.

Until 18 July 2020, Novoukrainka belonged to Chornobai Raion. The raion was abolished in July 2020 as part of the administrative reform of Ukraine, which reduced the number of raions of Cherkasy Oblast to four. The area of Chornobai Raion was merged into Zolotonosha Raion.

== Language ==
Distribution of the population by native language according to the 2001 census:

Language	Number	Percentage
Ukrainian	834	98.82%
Other^{[a]}	10	1.18%
Total	844	100.00%

^{a} Those who did not indicate their native language or indicated a language that was native to less than 1% of the local population.
