= Liudmyla Monastyrska =

Ukrainian spinto soprano

Liudmyla Monastyrska MAU, Shevchenko National Prize laureate
- Born: 25 May 1975 (age 51); Irkliiv, Ukrainian SSR, Soviet Union (now Cherkasy Oblast, Ukraine)
- Education: R. Glier Kyiv Institute of Music; Ukrainian National Tchaikovsky Academy of Music
- Occupation: Opera singer
- Musical career
- Instrument: Vocals

Liudmyla Viktorivna Monastyrska (Ukrainian: Людмила Вікторівна Монастирська; born 25 May 1975) is a Ukrainian spinto soprano.

== Early life and career ==
Born in Irkliiv, Cherkasy Oblast, she studied at the R. Glier Kyiv Institute of Music and Kyiv Conservatory.

Monastyrska made her debut with the Ukraine National Opera as Tatiana in Tchaikovsky's Eugene Onegin in 1996 and became a principal soloist with the company in 1998. There, and at the Mikhailovsky Theatre in St. Petersburg, she sang the title roles of Verdi's Aida and Ponchielli's La Gioconda, as well as Amelia in Verdi's Un ballo in maschera, Lisa in Tchaikovsky's The Queen of Spades, Nedda in Leoncavallo's Pagliacci, and Santuzza in Mascagni's Cavalleria rusticana.

In 2010 she appeared successfully on short notice in the title role of Puccini's Tosca at the Deutsche Oper Berlin, which led to her Italian debut at the Festival Puccini in Torre del Lago, Italy, under the conductor Alberto Veronesi. In February 2012 she appeared as Aida at La Scala, Milan.

== London Macbeth ==
In 2011, she appeared at Covent Garden, where she successfully stepped in for Micaela Carosi as Aida early in the season, with Fabio Luisi as the conductor. She was also engaged to sing Lady Macbeth in Verdi's Macbeth, with Simon Keenlyside in the title role and Antonio Pappano as the conductor. Rupert Christiansen of The Telegraph remarked that "she lacked nothing in volume or stamina, articulating the coloratura cleanly and pitching steadily ... if only one could have detected which language she was singing in." A video recording of the Macbeth production has been issued on DVD. In his review of the DVD, William Braun of Opera News wrote: "Liudmyla Monastyrska's Lady Macbeth is unusually well sung. The role in the 1865 version is a nasty vocal hybrid, but she does beautifully with the later style, sounding quite suitably apprehensive at the start of 'La luce langue,' as the plot spins. Elsewhere, in the earlier style, and almost alone among sopranos, she observes the staccato markings in 'Or tutti sorgete' and has thought about why Verdi might have written them. (She makes them into a cackle of incipient delight.) The sleepwalking scene is admirable, with the final high D-flat wonderfully colored, as if she had glimpsed the abyss."

== New York performances ==
She first appeared in New York at the 11 November 2012 annual concert of the Richard Tucker Music Foundation, where her "go-for-broke" performance of Lady Macbeth's "Vieni, t'affretta" received "a big ovation". She made her debut at the Metropolitan Opera on 23 November 2012 as Aida (again under conductor Fabio Luisi), to critical and audience acclaim. The critic of The New York Times, Corinna da Fonseca-Wollheim, wrote: "For Liudmyla Monastyrska, who brought her voluptuous soprano to the title role, it was a triumphant house debut. ... [She] comes to the Met a fully mature artist. She is gifted with a luscious round soprano that maintains its glow even in the softest notes. Her 'O patria mia' was beautifully drawn and colored with darker inflections that added dramatic intensity. A passage in which Ms. Monastyrska’s lines were perfectly shadowed by the cellos, even as they were elastically shaped, spoke volumes about the trust and communication between Mr. Luisi and his singers." David Salazar in the Latinos Post, wrote about her performance of the aria: "As she rose toward the high C near the end of the aria, she built a lengthy crescendo, but then delivered the C as a disembodied pianissimo that made the moment sublime."

On 30 April 2022, she replaced the Russian diva Anna Netrebko in the title role of Turandot after Netrebko was dropped by the Metropolitan Opera for her ambiguous stance toward Vladimir Putin and the 2022 Russian invasion of Ukraine. After her performance, Monastyrska wrapped herself in a Ukrainian flag at her curtain call.

== Royal Opera House ==
In 2013, she sang Abigaille in the Royal Opera's production of Verdi's Nabucco opposite Leo Nucci and Plácido Domingo who alternated as Nabucco. This production was broadcast in cinemas worldwide.

== Personal life ==
Monastyrska is married to Oleksandr Monastyrsky, a tenor soloist with the Municipal Opera for Children and Youth in Kyiv. They have two children.
