= Novooleksandrivka, Pokrovsk urban hromada, Pokrovsk Raion, Donetsk Oblast =

Village in Donetsk Oblast, Ukraine

Novooleksandrivka Новоолександрівка
- Village
- Interactive map of Novooleksandrivka
- Location of Novooleksandrivka within Ukraine Novooleksandrivka (Donetsk Oblast)
- Coordinates: 48°11′27″N 36°59′35″E
- Country: Ukraine
- Oblast: Donetsk Oblast
- Raion: Pokrovsk Raion
- Hromada: Pokrovsk urban hromada
- Founded: 1889

Area
  - Total: 0.643 km^{2} (0.248 sq mi)
- Elevation: 196 m (643 ft)

Population (2001 census)
  - Total: 135
  - Density: 210/km^{2} (544/sq mi)
- Time zone: UTC+2 (EET)
  - Summer (DST): UTC+3 (EEST)
- Postal code: 85371
- Area code: +380 623
- KATOTTH: UA14160210190077247

Novooleksandrivka (Ukrainian: Новоолександрівка; Russian: Новоалександровка) is a village in Pokrovsk urban hromada, Pokrovsk Raion, Donetsk Oblast, eastern Ukraine. It is located 62.78 kilometres (39.01 mi) north-northwest (NNW) from the centre of Donetsk city. It belongs to Pokrovsk urban hromada, one of the hromadas of Ukraine.

== Geography ==
The village borders with Solona river, a tributary of the Vovcha river. The absolute height is 96 metres above sea level.

== History ==
The settlement was founded in 1889.

=== Russian invasion of Ukraine ===
The village was captured by Russian forces in May 2025, during the full-scale Russian invasion of Ukraine.

== Demographics ==
As of the 2001 Ukrainian census, the settlement had 135 inhabitants, whose native languages were 94.20% Ukrainian, 5.07% Russian and 0.72 Belarusian.
