= Pokrovsk urban hromada =

Pokrovsk urban hromada Покровська міська громада
- Hromada
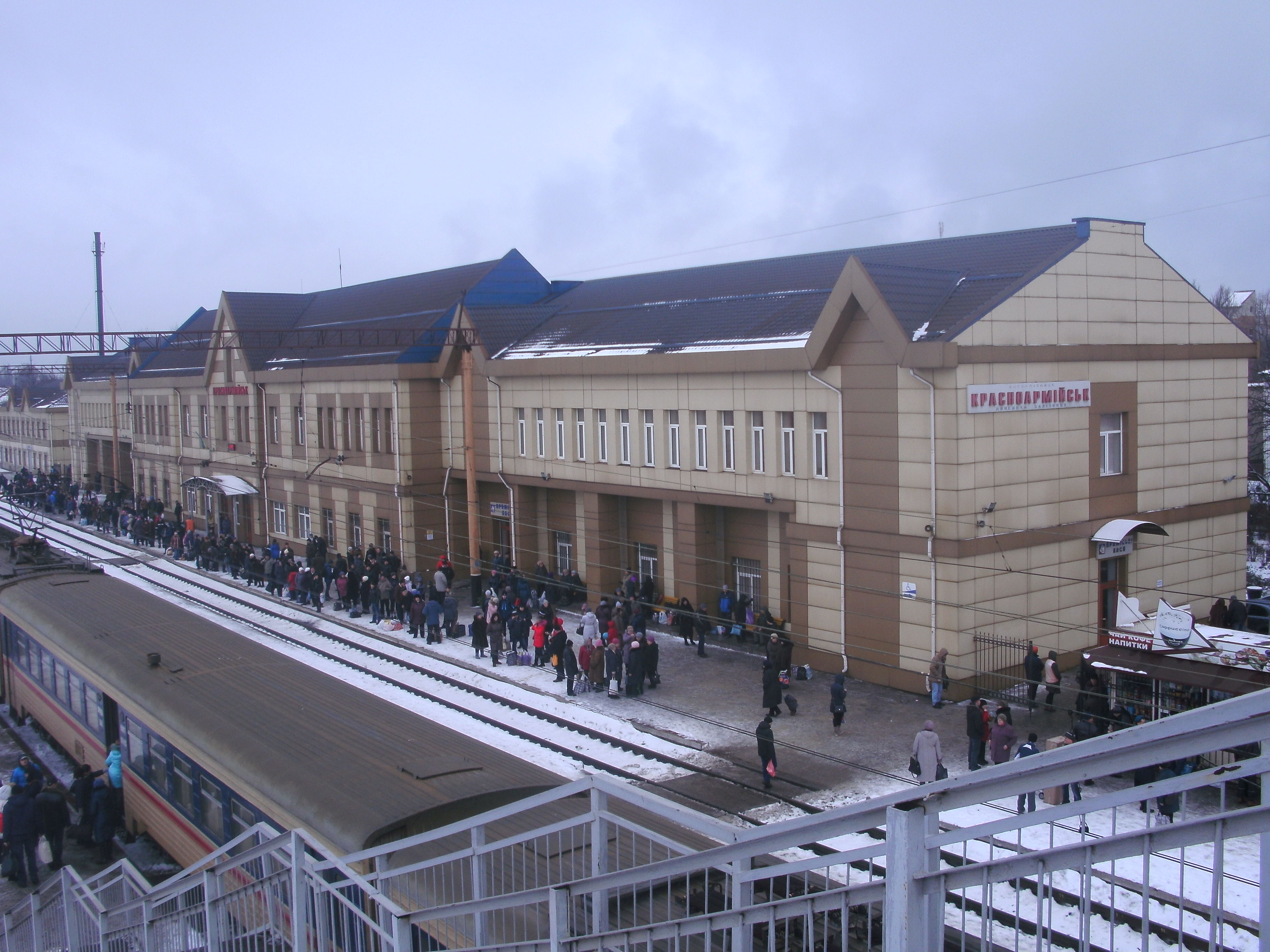
- Interactive map of Pokrovsk urban hromada
- Country: Ukraine
- Oblast: Donetsk
- Raion: Pokrovsk

Government
  - Head: Ruslan Trebushkin

Area
  - Total: 515.5 km^{2} (199.0 sq mi)

Population (2020)
  - Total: 82,388
  - Density: 159.8/km^{2} (413.9/sq mi)
- Settlements: 41
- Cities: 2
- Rural settlements: 8
- Villages: 31

Pokrovsk urban hromada (Ukrainian: Покровська міська громада) is a hromada of Ukraine, located in Pokrovsk Raion, Donetsk Oblast. Its administrative center is the city Pokrovsk.

It has an area of 515.5 square kilometres (199.0 mi^{2}) and a population of 82,388, as of 2020.

The hromada contains 41 settlements: 2 cities (Pokrovsk and Rodynske), 8 rural settlements (Chumatske, Chunyshyne, Kotliarivka, Kotlyne, Leontovychi, Nadiivka, Novopustynka, and Shevchenko), 31 villages:

- Bohdanivka
- Dachenske
- Hnativka
- Horikhove
- Hryshyne
- Lysivka
- Novoandriivka
- Novoielyzavetivka
- Novooleksandrivka
- Novoolenivka
- Novopavlivka
- Novotroitske
- Novoukrainka
- Novovasylivka
- Novyi Trud
- Pishchane
- Preobrazhenka
- Rih
- Solone
- Sribne
- Sukhyi Yar
- Troianda
- Troitske
- Ukrainka
- Uspenivka
- Vovkove
- Yasenove
- Zaporizhzhia
- Zelene
- Zhovte
- Zvirove

== See also ==
- List of hromadas of Ukraine
