= Irkliiv rural hromada =

Administrative unit in Cherkasy Oblast, Ukraine

Irkliiv rural hromada is a hromada of Ukraine, in Zolotonosha Raion, Cherkasy Oblast. Its administrative center is Irkliiv. It was formed on 29 March 2017 by merging Irkliiv, Melnykiv, and other village councils in Chornobai Raion. On 17 July 2020, it was assigned to Zolotonosha Raion in accordance with Verkhovna Rada resolution No. 807-IX. The area of the hromada is 926.2 km^{2}, and its population is 17,992 (2022 estimate)

Until 18 July 2020, the hromada belonged to Chornobai Raion. The raion was abolished in July 2020 as part of the administrative reform of Ukraine, which reduced the number of raions of Cherkasy Oblast to four. The area of Chornobai Raion was merged into Zolotonosha Raion.

== Structure ==
The hromada contains 16 village councils:

- Vasiutynska
- Veremiivska
- Zhovnynska
- Irkliivska
- Klishchynska
- Krutkivska
- Lykholitska
- Liashchivska
- Melnykivska
- Moskalenkivska
- Pershotravneva
- Prydniprovska
- Revbynska
- Starokovraiska
- Stepivska
- Tymchenkivska

The hromada contains 26 settlements: 2 rural settlements (Zhuravlyne and Myrne) and 24 villages:

- Batalyi
- Vasiutyntsi
- Veremiivka
- Voronnytsi
- Zhovnyne
- Zahorodyshche
- Irkliiv
- Klishchyntsi
- Kovrai
- Krutky
- Lykholity
- Liashchivka
- Melnyky
- Moskalenky
- Pershotravneve
- Prydniprovske
- Revbyntsi
- Skorodystyk
- Staryi Kovrai
- Stepove
- Tymchenky
- Chervonohirka
- Chervonokhyzhyntsi
- Chekhivka
