= Leontovychi =

Leontovychi Леонтовичі
- Rural settlement
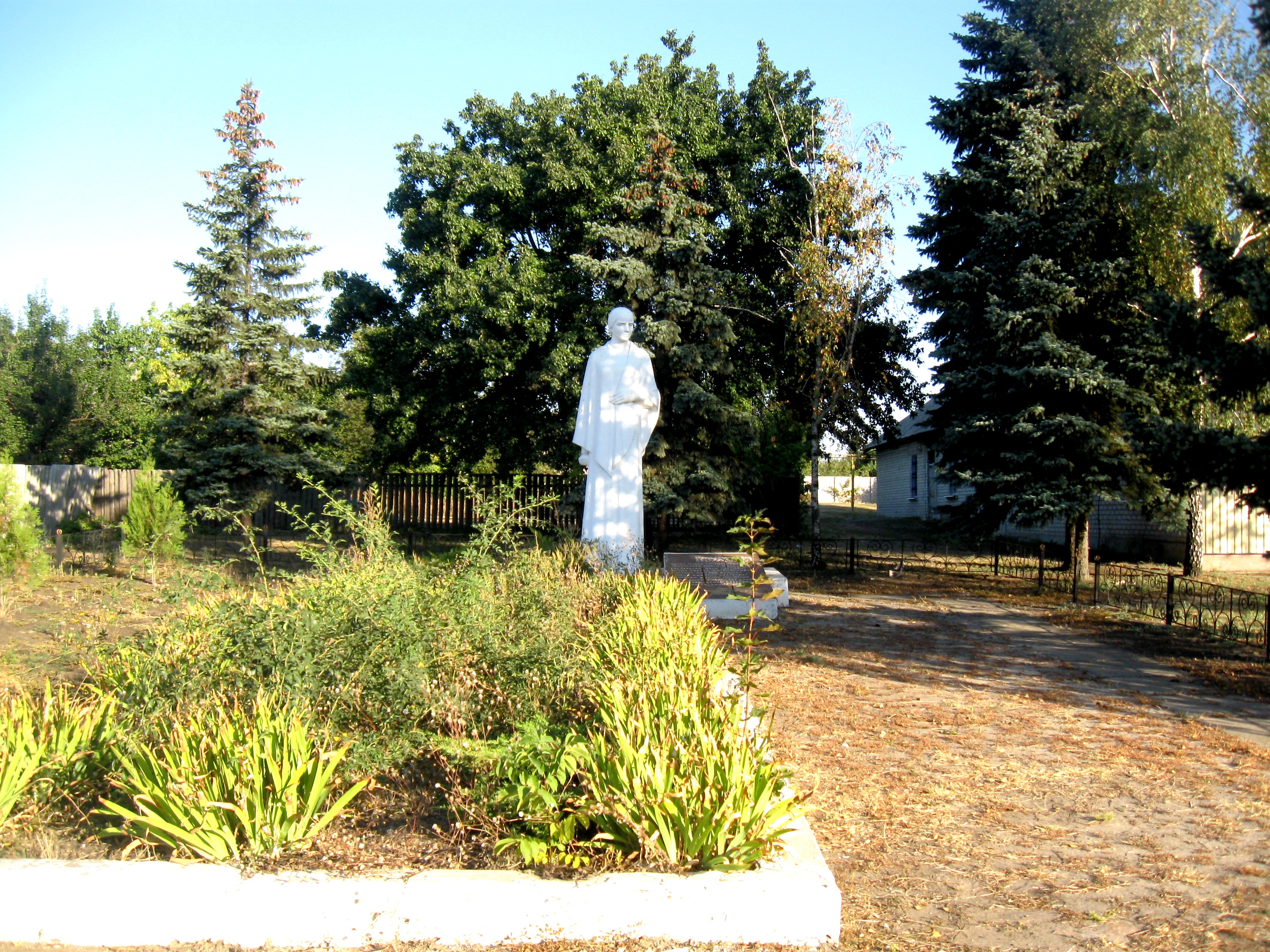
- Photograph of a Leontovychi monument
- Interactive map of Leontovychi
- Location of Udachne Leontovychi (Ukraine)
- Coordinates: 48°15′29″N 37°7′58″E
- Country: Ukraine
- Oblast: Donetsk Oblast
- Raion: Pokrovsk Raion
- Hromada: Pokrovsk urban hromada
- Founded: 1913
- Elevation: 161 m (528 ft)

Population (2001)
  - Total: 698
- Time zone: UTC+2
  - Summer (DST): UTC+3
- Postal code: 85305
- Area code: +380 623

Leontovychi (Ukrainian: Леонтовичі), formerly known as Pershe Travnia (Ukrainian: Перше Травня), is a rural settlement in Pokrovsk urban hromada, Pokrovsk Raion, Donetsk Oblast, Ukraine.

According to the 2001 Ukrainian census, the population of Lentovychi was 698 people. The native languages were 73.35% Ukrainian, 26.22% Russian and 0.14% Gagauz.

Due to the law "On the Condemnation and Prohibition of Propaganda of Russian Imperial Policy in Ukraine and the Decolonization of Toponymy" (in April 2023 signed by President Volodymyr Zelenskyy) every toponomy in Ukraine with the name "Pershe Travnia" (a reference to International Workers' Day) was set to be renamed. Pershe Travnia was renamed in September 2024.
