= Zolotonoshka (river) =

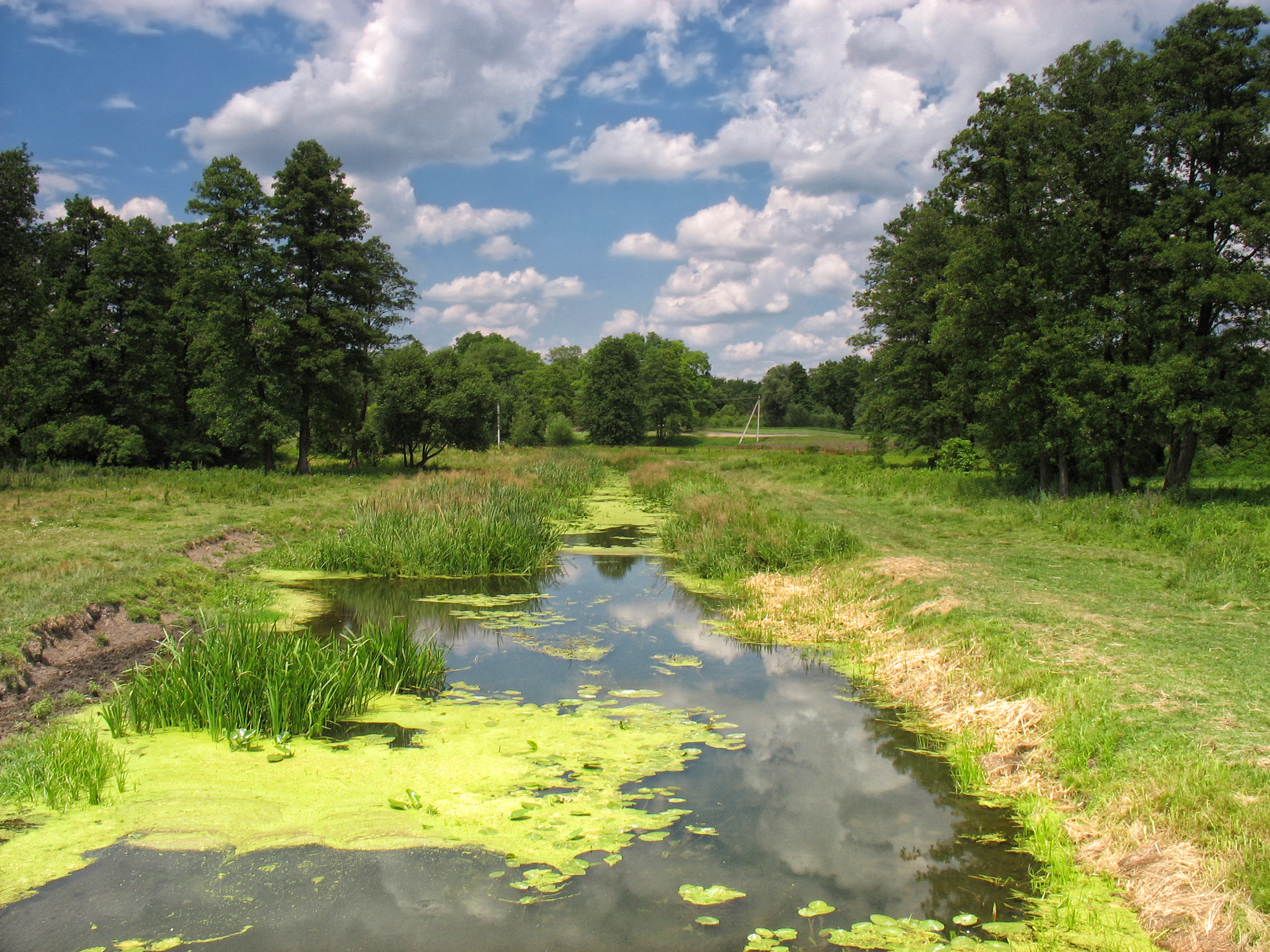
- The Zolotonoshka River in Fall
- Native name: Золотоношка (Ukrainian)

Location
- Country: Ukraine
- Region: Cherkasy region

Physical characteristics
- Source: Lake
  - location: Zolotonoshka village
  - coordinates: 50°1′40″N 32°5′42″E
- Mouth: Dnieper
  - location: near Zolotonosha, Chapayevka
  - coordinates: 49.4987°N 32.1851°E
- Length: 88 km (55 mi)
- Basin size: 1,260 km^{2} (490 sq mi)

Basin features
- Progression: Dnieper→ Dnieper–Bug estuary→ Black Sea

The Zolotonoshka is a small river in south-central Ukraine. The Zolotonoshka is a left tributary of the Dnieper (Dnipro). The length of the river is 88 kilometers. The drainage basin is 1260 km^{2}.

The name is derived from a legend that Ukrainian cossacks were hiding gold (from Ukrainian: золото (zoloto - gold) in the river. Scientists explain that the sand on the bottom of the river was shining in the sunlight, making people believe that there was gold. It is located near and chiefly serves the needs of the city of Zolotonosha. Since about 2011, the sewage from the city has been drained directly into the river without any processing, destroying the eco-system of the river.
