= Yasenove, Donetsk Oblast =

Rural locality in Donetsk Oblast, Ukraine

Yasenove Ясенове
- Village
- Interactive map of Yasenove
- Location of Yasenove within Ukraine Yasenove (Donetsk Oblast)
- Coordinates: 48°06′24″N 37°03′57″E
- Country: Ukraine
- Oblast: Donetsk Oblast
- Raion: Pokrovsk Raion
- Hromada: Pokrovsk urban hromada
- Founded: 1929
- Elevation: 170 m (560 ft)

Population (2001 census)
  - Total: 324
- Time zone: UTC+2 (EET)
  - Summer (DST): UTC+3 (EEST)
- Postal code: 85373
- Area code: +380 623
- KATOTTH: UA14020110160045619

Yasenove (Ukrainian: Ясенове; Russian: Ясеновое) is a village in Pokrovsk urban hromada, Pokrovsk Raion, Donetsk Oblast, eastern Ukraine. It is located 55.55 kilometres (34.52 mi) northwest by north (NWbN) from the centre of Donetsk city and 21.07 kilometres (13.09 mi) southwest by south (SWbS) from the district centre, Pokrovsk.

== History ==
The settlement was founded in 1929.

=== Russian invasion of Ukraine ===
Russian forces captured the village in January 2025, during the Russian invasion of Ukraine.

== Demographics ==
As of the 2001 Ukrainian census, the settlement had 324 inhabitants, whose native languages were 95.06% Ukrainian and 4.94% Russian.
