= Novoandriivka, Pokrovsk Raion, Donetsk Oblast =

Rural locality in Donetsk Oblast, Ukraine

Novoandriivka Новоандріївка
- Village
- Interactive map of Novoandriivka
- Location within Ukraine Location within Donetsk Oblast
- Coordinates: 48°06′25″N 37°02′39″E
- Country: Ukraine
- Oblast: Donetsk Oblast
- Raion: Pokrovsk Raion
- Hromada: Pokrovsk urban hromada
- Founded: 1922

Government
  - Head: Sedash Oleksandr Mykolayovych
- Elevation: 166 m (545 ft)

Population (2001 census)
  - Total: 65
- Time zone: UTC+2 (EET)
  - Summer (DST): UTC+3 (EEST)
- Postal code: 85373
- Area code: +380 6235
- KATOTTH: UA14160210160058108

Novoandriivka (Ukrainian: Новоандріївка; Russian: Новоандреевка) is a village in Pokrovsk urban hromada, Pokrovsk Raion, Donetsk Oblast, eastern Ukraine. It is located 56.93 kilometres (35.37 mi) west by north (WbN) from the centre of Donetsk city. It was successfully captured by Russian Armed Forces in February 2025.

== History ==
The town was founded in 1922.

=== Russian invasion of Ukraine ===
The village was captured by Russian forces in January 2025, during the full-scale Russian invasion of Ukraine.

== Demographics ==
As of the 2001 Ukrainian census, the settlement had 65 inhabitants, whose native languages were 90.77% Ukrainian, 7.69% Russian and 1.54% Moldovan (Romanian).
