= Irkliiv =

Rural locality in Cherkasy Oblast, Ukraine

Irkliiv Іркліїв
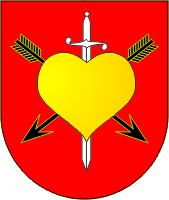
- Coat of arms

- Location in Cherkasy Oblast Irkliiv (Ukraine)
- Coordinates: 49°31′1″N 32°20′10″E
- Country: Ukraine
- Oblast: Cherkasy Oblast
- Raion: Chornobai Raion
- Hromada: Irkliiv rural hromada
- Time zone: UTC+2 (EET)
  - Summer (DST): UTC+3 (EEST)
- Postal code: 19950

Irkliiv (Ukrainian: Іркліїв) is a village in the Irkliiv rural hromada of the Chornobai Raion of Cherkasy Oblast in Ukraine.

== Geography ==
Irkliiv lies in the Dnieper Lowland.

== History ==
The village is known to have been founded in 1601. It served as a sotnia town of Pereyaslav Regiment. During the 1660s and 1670s Irkliiv was repeatedly ruined by Tatars.

During the Soviet times Irkliiv was a district centre of Cherkasy Oblast. On 19 July 2020, as a result of the administrative-territorial reform and liquidation of the Chornobai Raion, the village became part of the Zolotonosha Raion.

== Notable residents ==
- Liudmyla Monastyrska (b. 1975), Ukrainian spinto soprano

== Bibliography ==
- "Irklejew". Geographical Dictionary of the Kingdom of Poland (in Polish). 3. Warszawa: Kasa im. Józefa Mianowskiego. 1882. p. 300.
