= Nova Dmytrivka rural hromada =

Coordinates: 49°42′25″N 31°57′40″E

Nova Dmytrivka rural hromada Новодмитрівська сільська громада
- Hromada
- Interactive map of Nova Dmytrivka rural hromada
- Country: Ukraine
- Oblast: Cherkasy
- Raion: Zolotonosha

Area
  - Total: 388.9 km^{2} (150.2 sq mi)

Population (2021)
  - Total: 10,196
  - Density: 26.22/km^{2} (67.90/sq mi)
- Settlements: 18
- Villages: 18
- Website: novodmytrivska-gromada.gov.ua

Nova Dmytrivka rural hromada is a hromada in the Zolotonosha Raion of Cherkasy Oblast of Ukraine. Its administrative centre is the village of Nova Dmytrivka.

== Composition ==
The hromada consists of 18 villages:

- Antypivka
- Bakaivka
- Dmytrivka
- Dibrivka
- Domantove
- Drabivtsi
- Kholodne
- Kovtuny
- Lvivka
- Markizivka
- Matviivka, Zolotonosha Raion
- Melesivka
- Mytsalivka
- Nova Dmytrivka (administrative centre)
- Podilske
- Senkivtsi
- Skorykivka
- Vilkhy
