= Chornobai =

Rural locality in Cherkasy Oblast, Ukraine

Chornobai Чорнобай
- Rural settlement
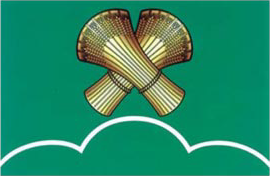
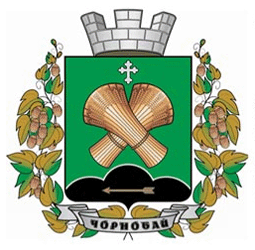
- Flag Coat of arms

- Location within Cherkasy Oblast Location within Ukraine
- Coordinates: 49°40′28″N 32°19′48″E
- Country: Ukraine
- Oblast: Cherkasy Oblast
- Raion: Zolotonosha Raion
- Founded: 1656

Area
  - Total: 8,743 km^{2} (3,376 sq mi)
- Elevation: 121 m (397 ft)

Population
  - Total: 6,878
- Time zone: UTC+2 (EET)
  - Summer (DST): UTC+3 (EEST)
- Postal code: 19900
- Area code: +380 4739

Chornobai (Ukrainian: Чорнобай) is a rural settlement in Zolotonosha Raion, Cherkasy Oblast, central Ukraine. It hosts the administration of Chornobai settlement hromada, one of the hromadas of Ukraine. Population: 6,878 (2022 estimate).

== History ==
Until 18 July 2020, Chornobai served as an administrative center of Chornobai Raion. The raion was abolished in July 2020 as part of the administrative reform of Ukraine, which reduced the number of raions of Cherkasy Oblast to four. The area of Chornobai Raion was merged into Zolotonosha Raion.

Until 26 January 2024, Chornobai was designated urban-type settlement. On this day, a new law entered into force which abolished this status, and Chornobai became a rural settlement.

== Population ==
=== Language ===
Distribution of the population by native language according to the 2001 census:

Language	Number	Percentage
Ukrainian	8 070	97.66%
Russian	158	1.91%
Other (Note: Those who did not indicate their native language or indicated a language that was native to less than 1% of the local population.)	35	0.43%
Total	8 263	100.00%

== Geography ==
=== Climate ===
Chornobai has a continental climate. Average temperature is -6°C in January and +24°C in July.
