= Zolotonosha =

Town in Cherkasy Oblast, Ukraine

Zolotonosha Золотоноша
- City
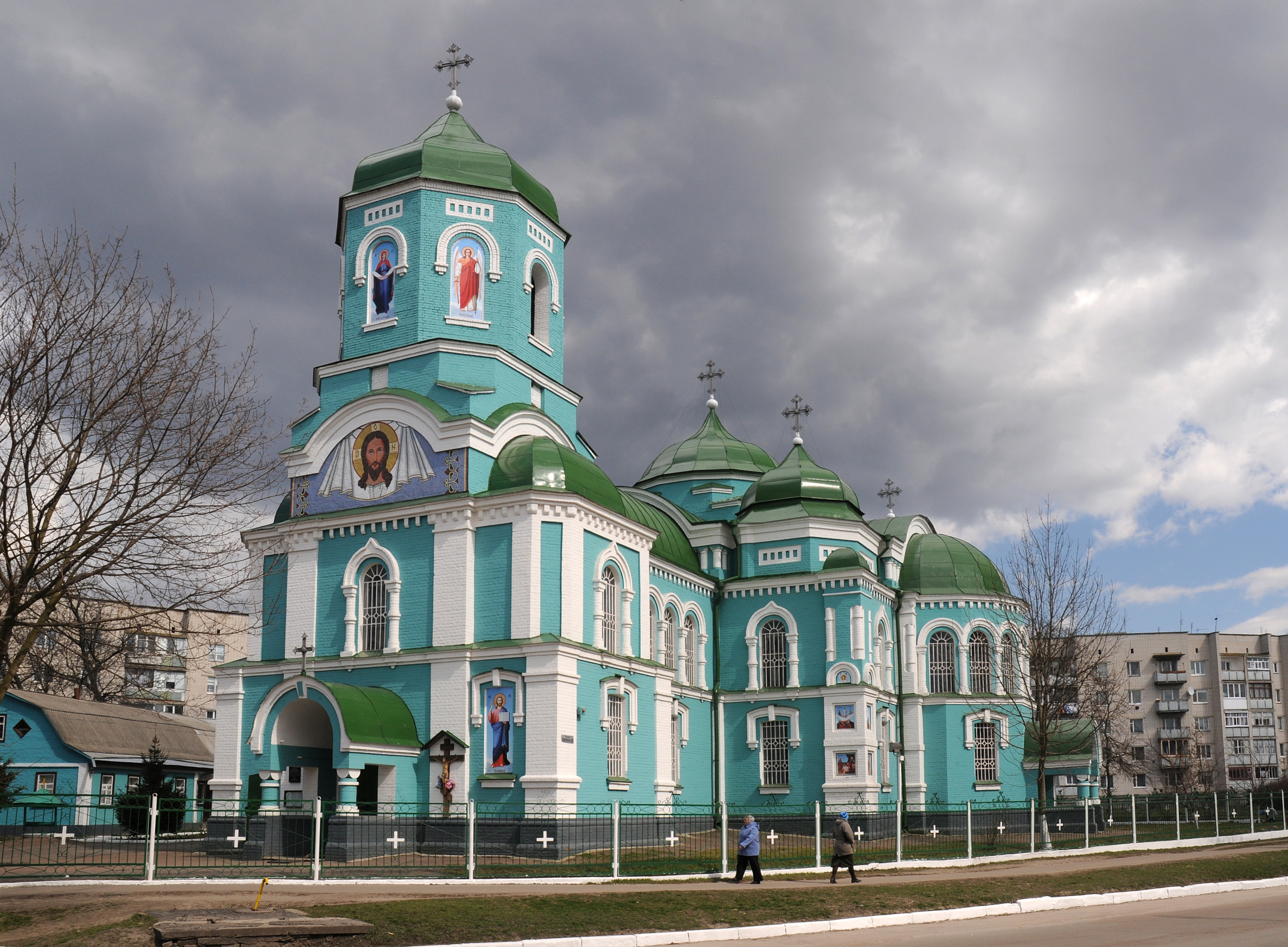
- The Holy Dormition Cathedral

- Flag Coat of arms

- Location of Zolotonosha Zolotonosha (Ukraine)
- Coordinates: 49°40′07″N 32°02′32″E
- Country: Ukraine
- Oblast: Cherkasy Oblast
- Raion: Zolotonosha Raion
- Hromada: Zolotonosha urban hromada
- First mentioned: 1576
- Magdeburg rights: 1635

Government
  - Mayor: Vitaliy Voytsehivskyi

Area
  - City: 21.65 km^{2} (8.36 sq mi)

Population (2022)
  - City: 27 206
  - Density: 1.2/km^{2} (3.2/sq mi)
  - Metro: 28,768
- Postal code: 19700-19705
- Area code: +380 4737
- Website: http://zolotonosha.ck.ua/

Zolotonosha (Ukrainian: Золотоноша, IPA: [zolotoˈnɔʃɐ]) is a city located in Cherkasy Oblast (region) in central Ukraine. The city serves as the administrative center of Zolotonosha Raion (district). It hosts the administration of Zolotonosha urban hromada, one of the hromadas of Ukraine. Population: 27,206 (2022 estimate).

Zolotonosha is located in Dnieper Lowland on the Zolotonoshka River, a tributary of the Dnipro, within 30 km (19 mi) of the oblast's administrative center, Cherkasy. The railroad line from Bakhmach to Odesa and the highways connecting Kyiv to Kremenchuk and Cherkasy to Shramkivka pass through the city.

== Administrative status ==
Until 18 July 2020, Zolotonosha was designated as a city of oblast significance and belonged to Zolotonosha Municipality but not to the Zolotonosha Raion even though it was the center of the raion. As part of the administrative reform of Ukraine, which reduced the number of raions of Cherkasy Oblast to four, the city was merged into the Zolotonosha Raion.

== History ==
Zolotonosha was first mentioned in written works around 1576, when it was part of Poland. It was administratively located in the Kijów Voivodeship in the Lesser Poland Province. In 1635 the town was granted the Magdeburg rights. It was a possession of various Polish nobles, including the Domont-Moszeński and Olekszyc families, before it passed it powerful magnate Jeremi Wiśniowiecki, father of future King of Poland Michał Korybut Wiśniowiecki. whose family built a castle there.

Afterwards, the town was captured by the Cossacks. Under the Cossack Hetmanate Zolotonosha served as a sotnia town of Pereiaslav Regiment. In 1666, Cossacks of the Pereiaslav Regiment repelled forces of Shcherbatov at Zolotonosha. In 1680, the town was devastated by a fire. After 1796 it was incorporated into Malorossia and then in 1802 became a part of Poltava Governorate, meaning that Jews were allowed to settle in the city and started to gradually arrive in larger numbers.

Under the Russian Empire Zolotonosha was a centre of trade, crafts and agriculture. Between 1860 and 1897 its population increased from 7,200 to 8,700 inhabitants. There was a pogrom in October 1905, which ended with much of the town being burned down and Jews being targeted. During the Ukrainian War of Independence (1917–1921), Zolotonosha was part of the Ukrainian People's Republic and Ukrainian State, before it became part of the Ukrainian SSR, a republic of the Soviet Union. During this period, there were two more pogroms, one on April 24, 1919 committed by local bandits, and another on May 12 committed by Red Army troops. Afterwards it was administratively part of the Kremenchuk Governorate of Ukraine, and after its dissolution of the Poltava Governorate of Ukraine. In 1933 Zolotonosha's population was around 13,000. In 1939, the 2,087 members of the Jewish community comprised 11.4% of the town's total population.

During World War II, Zolotonosha was occupied by Germany from September 1941 to September 1943. In September 1941, 300 Jews were murdered in a mass execution. On 22 November 1941, in Strunkovka, just northwest of the town, more than 3,500 Jews were killed in another massacre. The city was recaptured by the Red Army in September 1943.

Under the Soviet rule Zolotonosha served as a centre of mechanical and processing industry, housing an agricultural school. When the Soviet Union dissolved in 1991, the city became part of independent Ukraine.

== Population ==
Historical population
Year	Pop.	±%
1861	6,719	—
1888	9,552	+42.2%
1897	8,739	−8.5%
1933	13,000	+48.8%
2001	28,375	+118.3%
2022	27,206	−4.1%

=== Language ===
Distribution of the population by native language according to the 2001 census:

Language	Number	Percentage
Ukrainian	26 267	92.57%
Russian	1 846	6.51%
Other^{[a]}	262	0.92%
Total	28 375	100.00%

^{a} Those who did not indicate their native language or indicated a language that was native to less than 1% of the local population.

== Geography ==
=== Climate ===
Climate data for Zolotonosha (1991–2020)
Month	Jan	Feb	Mar	Apr	May	Jun	Jul	Aug	Sep	Oct	Nov	Dec	Year
Mean daily maximum °C (°F)	−0.5 (31.1)	1.0 (33.8)	7.0 (44.6)	15.9 (60.6)	22.3 (72.1)	25.7 (78.3)	27.6 (81.7)	27.2 (81.0)	21.1 (70.0)	13.7 (56.7)	5.7 (42.3)	0.9 (33.6)	14.0 (57.2)
Daily mean °C (°F)	−3.4 (25.9)	−2.6 (27.3)	2.3 (36.1)	10.0 (50.0)	16.1 (61.0)	19.8 (67.6)	21.5 (70.7)	20.5 (68.9)	14.8 (58.6)	8.4 (47.1)	2.6 (36.7)	−1.8 (28.8)	9.0 (48.2)
Mean daily minimum °C (°F)	−6.1 (21.0)	−5.7 (21.7)	−1.5 (29.3)	4.6 (40.3)	10.0 (50.0)	14.0 (57.2)	15.6 (60.1)	14.2 (57.6)	9.3 (48.7)	4.1 (39.4)	0.0 (32.0)	−3.8 (25.2)	4.6 (40.3)
Average precipitation mm (inches)	38 (1.5)	35 (1.4)	42 (1.7)	31 (1.2)	63 (2.5)	72 (2.8)	68 (2.7)	47 (1.9)	54 (2.1)	44 (1.7)	39 (1.5)	42 (1.7)	575 (22.6)
Average precipitation days (≥ 1.0 mm)	8.3	7.0	8.2	6.4	7.8	8.2	7.3	5.6	6.6	6.6	7.0	8.3	87.3
Average relative humidity (%)	85.8	82.4	76.6	67.2	66.8	69.1	70.5	69.4	74.9	80.9	86.2	87.2	76.4
Mean monthly sunshine hours	42	67	126	190	270	297	304	283	190	117	43	30	1,959
Source: NOAA

== Monuments of architecture ==
- Preobrazhenska Church of the Krasnohirsky Monastery. Designed by Ivan Hryhorovych-Barskyi in the Ukrainian Baroque style; built in 1767–1771.
- Sviato-Uspenskyi Cathedral, 1909.
- Statue of Taras Shevchenko, 1924–1926.

== People ==
- Aleksei Barannikov (1890-1952) Russian linguist
- Isaac Boleslavsky (9 June 1919–14 February 1977, Minsk) Jewish chess grandmaster
- Ber Borochov (1881–1917) Jewish founder of the Poale Zion party and supporter of the Red Army
- Mykhailo Drai-Khmara (10 October 1889 - 1939), Ukrainian philologist and poet
- Abe Elenkrieg (1878–1965) American klezmer musician
- Meyer Kanewsky (c. 1880–1924) American Hazzan and opera singer
- Ivan Poddubny (1871–1949) Russian and Soviet singles wrestler of Ukrainian ethnicity, multiple-time world wrestling champion

== Gallery ==
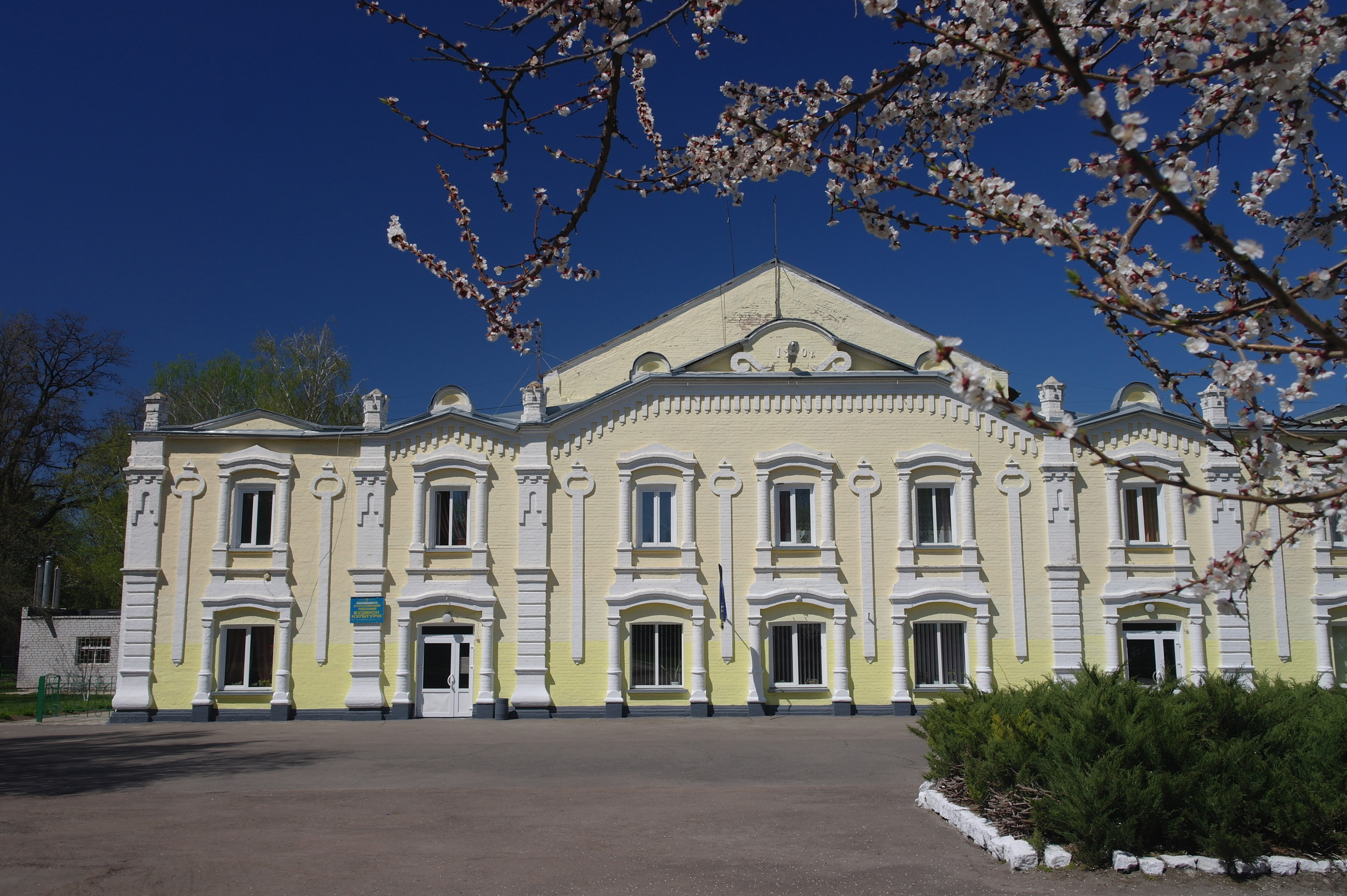
House of Culture

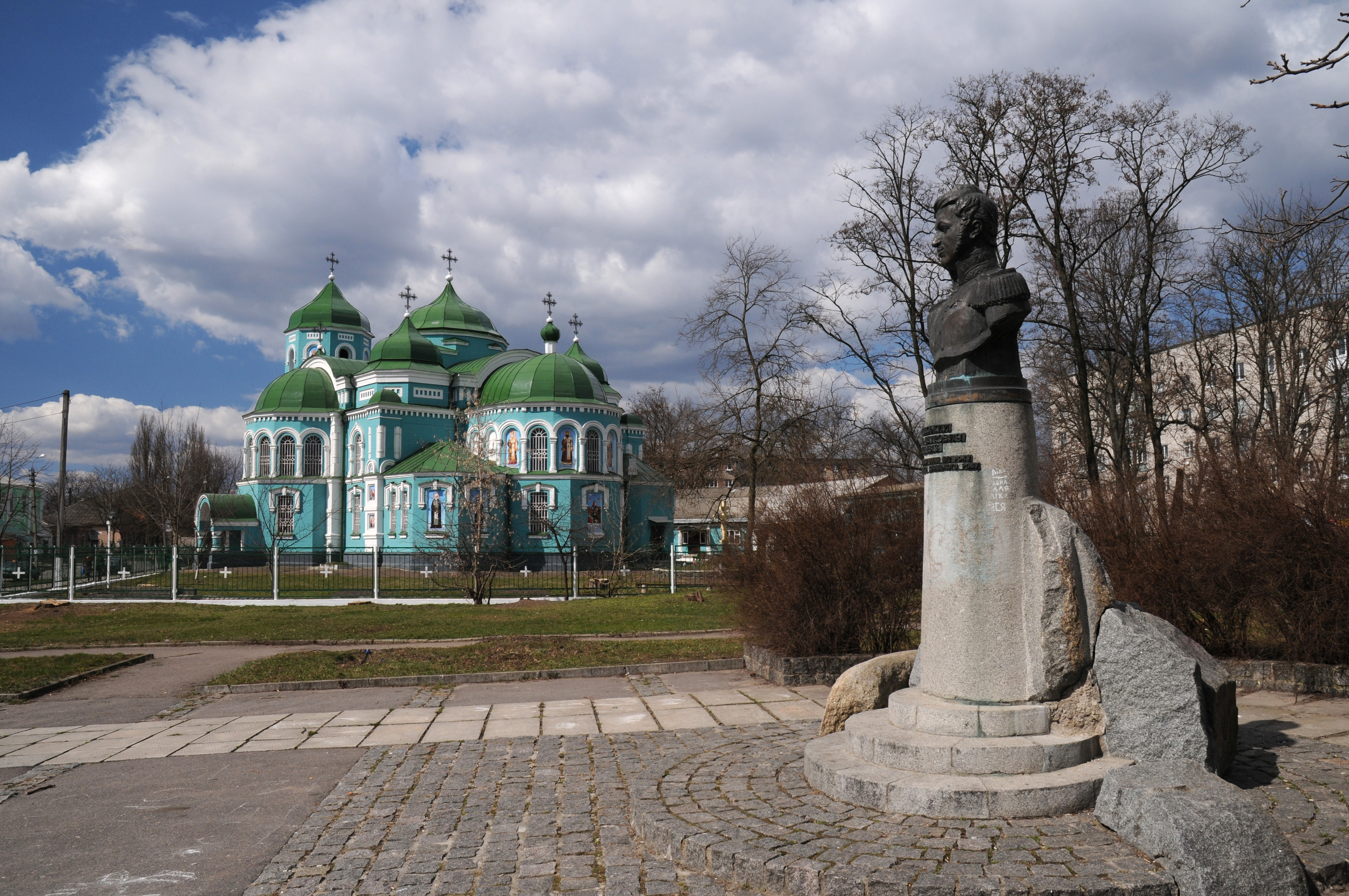
Monument and Assumption Cathedral

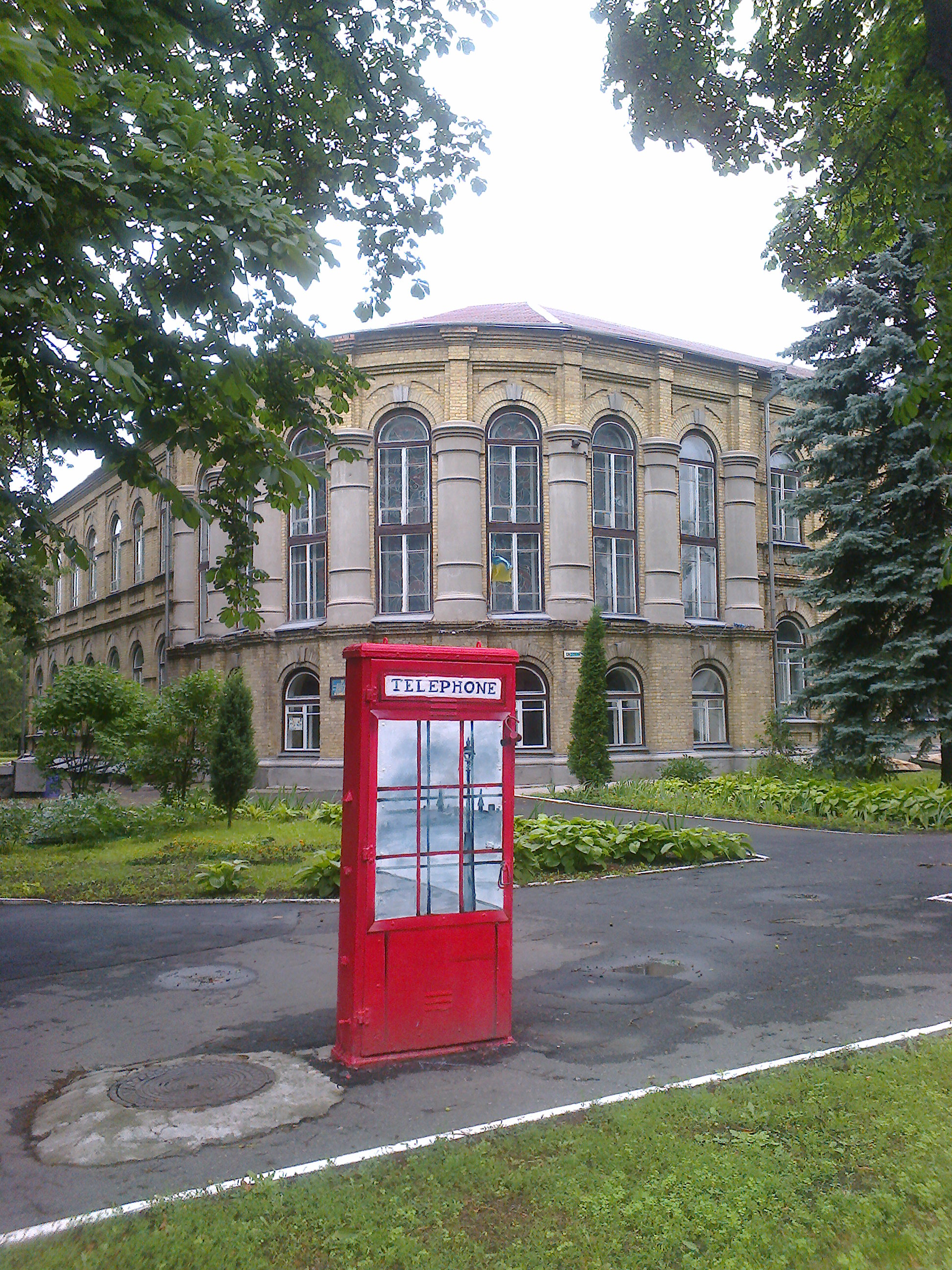
Agricultural school

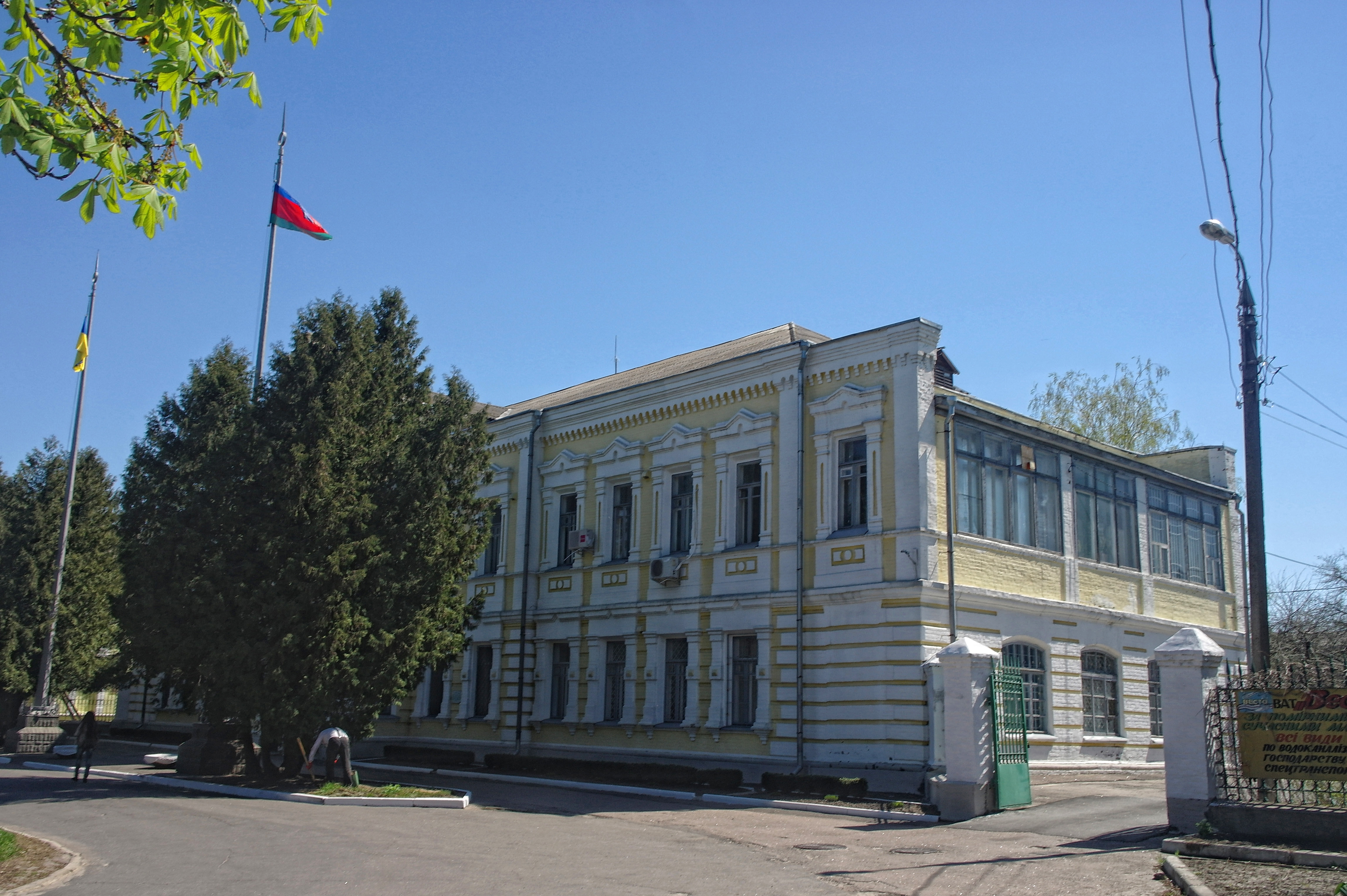
District administration

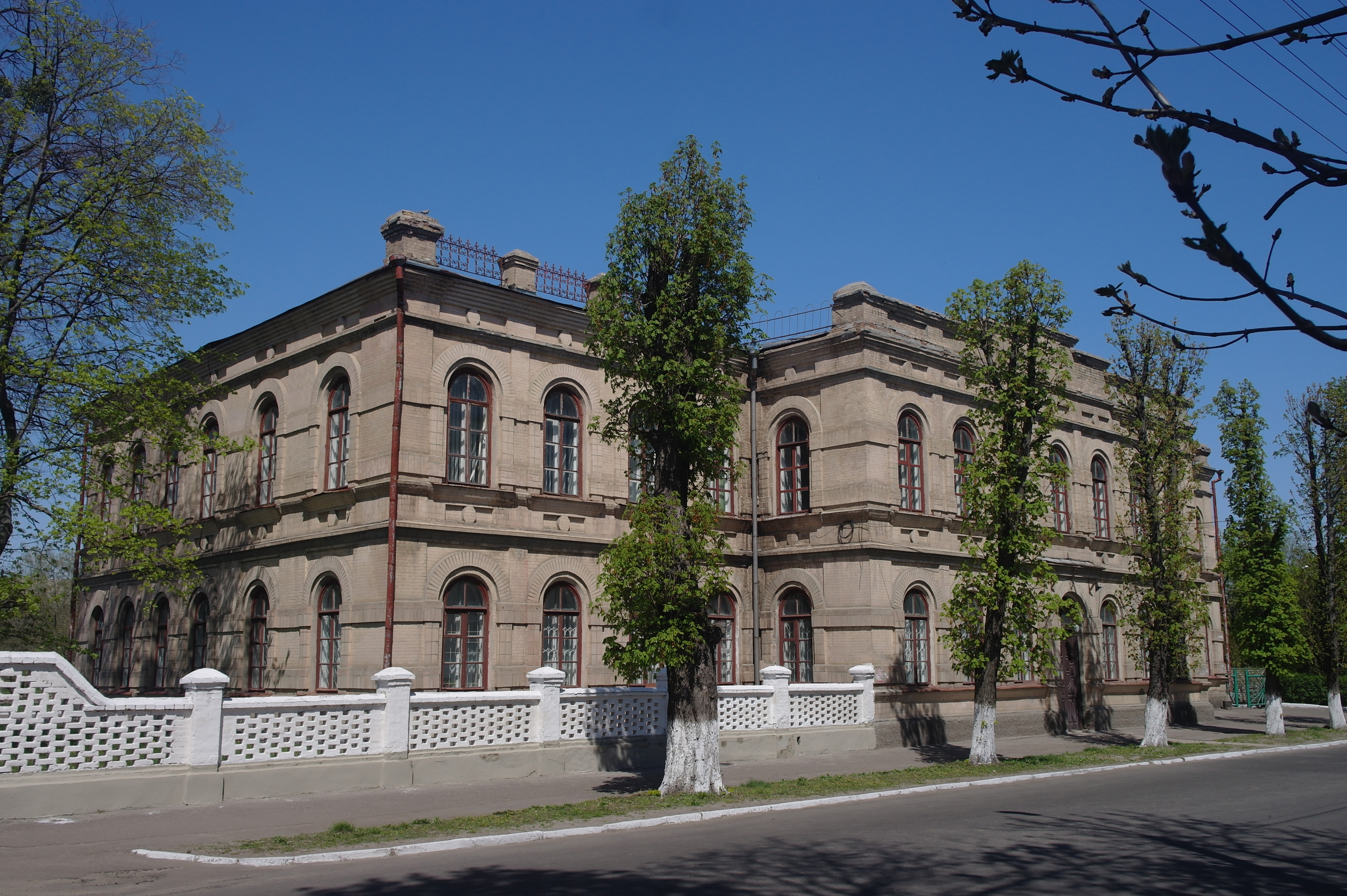
Former women's gymnasium

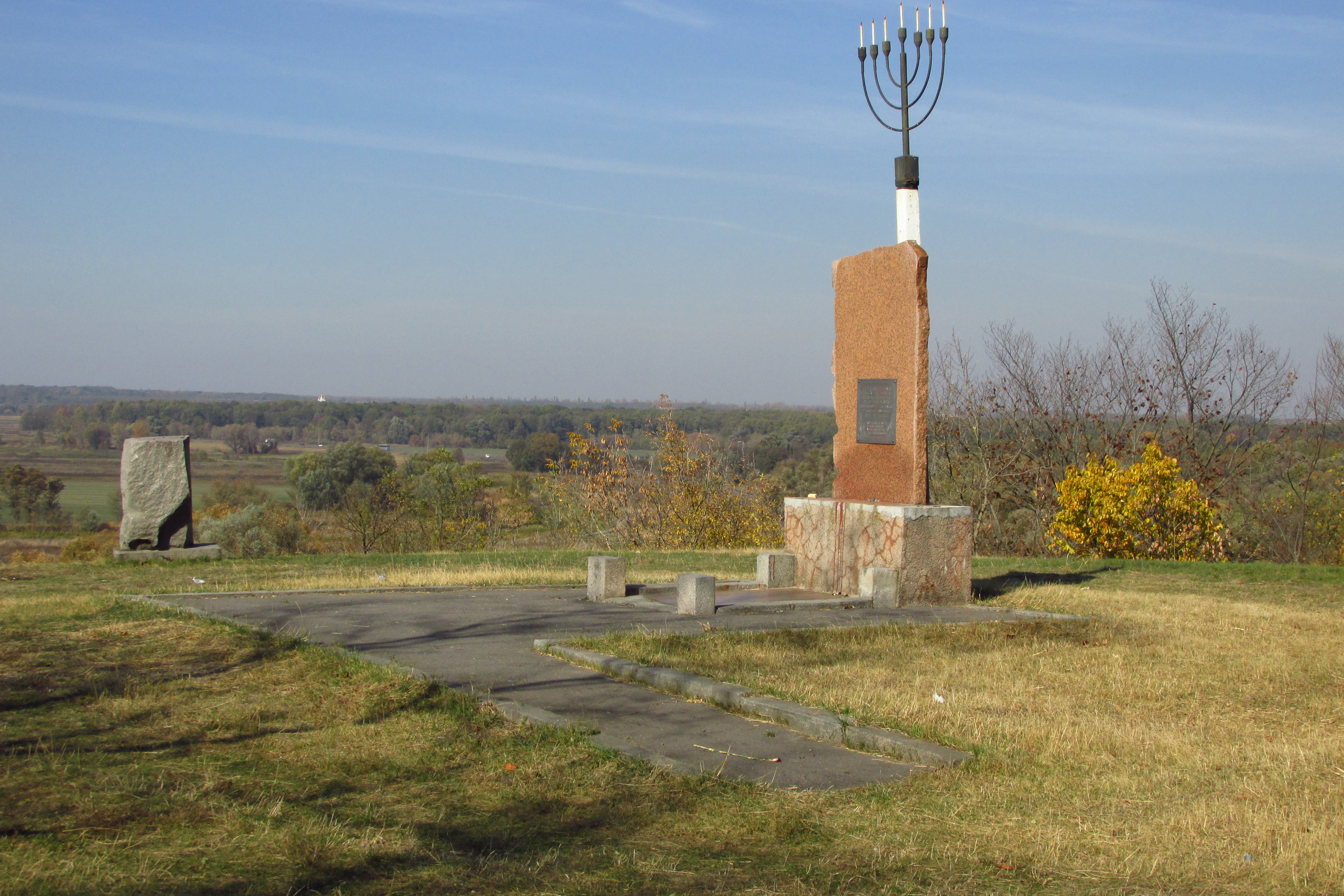
Holocaust monument near Zolotonosha
