= Chornobai settlement hromada =

Administrative unit in Cherkasy Oblast, Ukraine

Chornobai settlement hromada is a hromada of Ukraine, in Zolotonosha Raion, Cherkasy Oblast. Its administrative center is the rural settlement of Chornobai. It was formed by the government on June 12, 2020. The area of the hromada is 616.2 km^{2}, and it has a population of 19,839 (2022 estimate)

Until 18 July 2020, the hromada belonged to Chornobai Raion. The raion was abolished in July 2020 as part of the administrative reform of Ukraine, which reduced the number of raions of Cherkasy Oblast to four. The area of Chornobai Raion was merged into Zolotonosha Raion.

== Composition ==
The hromada contains 26 settlements: 4 rural settlements (Chornobai, Ivanivka, Pryvitne, and Vyshnivka) and 22 villages:

- Bakaieve
- Bohodukhivka
- Frankivka
- Hryhorivka
- Khrestyteleve
- Krasenivka
- Lukashivka
- Mala Burimka
- Mali Kanivtsi
- Marianivka
- Mokhnach
- Mykhailivka
- Nove Zhyttia
- Novoselytsia
- Novoukrainka
- Savkivka
- Staryi Mokhnach
- Tarasivka
- Velyka Burimka
- Velyki Kanivtsi
- Veselyi Khutir
- Veselyi Podil
