= Drabiv Raion =

Former subdivision of Cherkasy Oblast, Ukraine

- Raion
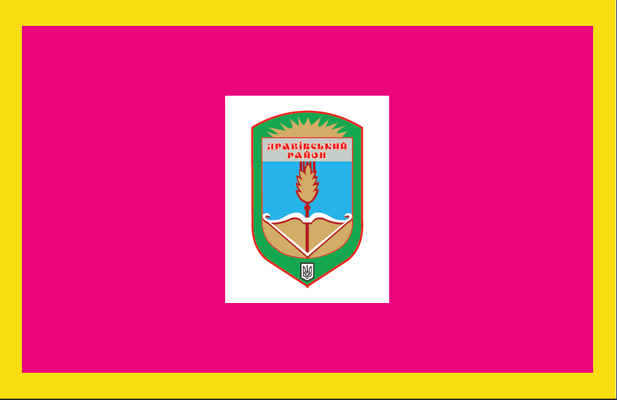
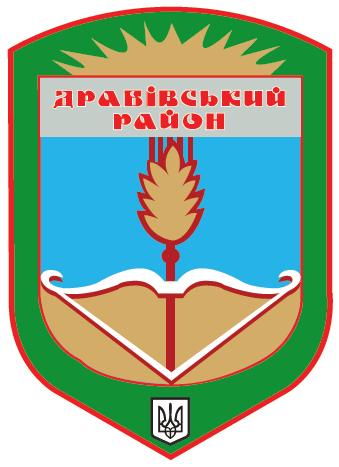
- Flag Coat of arms

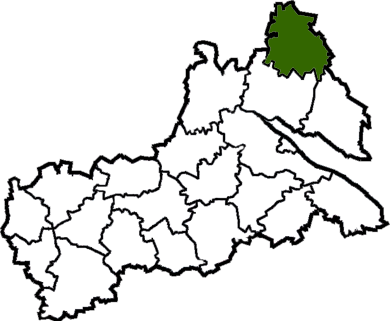
- Raion location in Cherkasy Oblast
- Coordinates: 49°59′46.4″N 32°8′25.8″E
- Country: Ukraine
- Region: Cherkasy Oblast
- Disestablished: 18 July 2020
- Subdivisions: List: — city councils; — settlement councils; — rural councils; Number of localities: — cities; — urban-type settlements; — villages; — rural settlements

Area
  - Total: 1,160 km^{2} (450 sq mi)

Population (2020)
  - Total: 32,932
  - Density: 28.4/km^{2} (73.5/sq mi)
- Time zone: UTC+02:00 (EET)
  - Summer (DST): UTC+03:00 (EEST)
- Area code: +380

Drabiv Raion (Ukrainian: Драбівський район) was a raion (district) of Cherkasy Oblast, central Ukraine. Its administrative centre was located at the urban-type settlement of Drabiv. The raion was abolished on 18 July 2020 as part of the administrative reform of Ukraine, which reduced the number of raions of Cherkasy Oblast to four. The area of Drabiv Raion was merged into Zolotonosha Raion. The last estimate of the raion population was 32,932 (2020 est.)

At the time of disestablishment, the raion consisted of three hromadas:

- Drabiv settlement hromada with the administration in Drabiv;
- Shramkivka rural hromada with the administration in the selo of Shramkivka;
- Velykyi Khutir rural hromada with the administration in the selo of Velykyi Khutir.
