= Hanna Lazarevych =

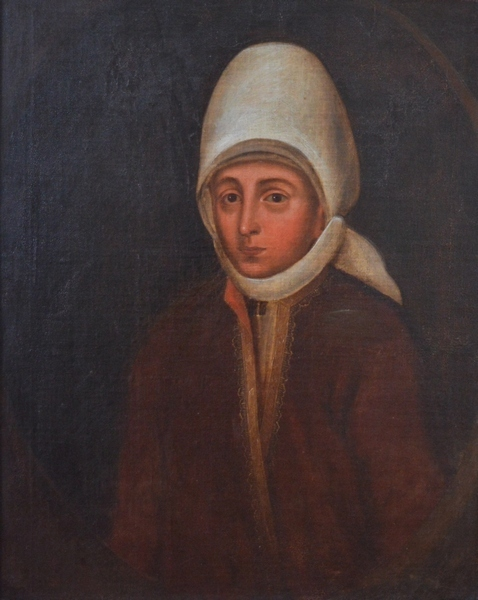
Ганна Лазаревич

Hanna Lazarevych (Ukrainian: Лазаревич Ганна Романівна) (?–1737), was the Hetmana of the Cossack Hetmanate by marriage to Pavlo Polubotok, Hetman of Ukraine (r. 1722–1724).

Her father was Roman Lazarevych, a NIzhyn regimental judge. Hanna had first been married to R. Zhurakivsky; following her first husband's death, she married Polubotok, in 1718.

Anna appears in the historical record as the author of various complaints and missives, such as requests that some of her fleeing subjects be returned.
