= Shevchenko, Pokrovsk urban hromada =

Rural settlement in Donetsk Oblast, Ukraine

Shevchenko Шевченко
- Rural settlement
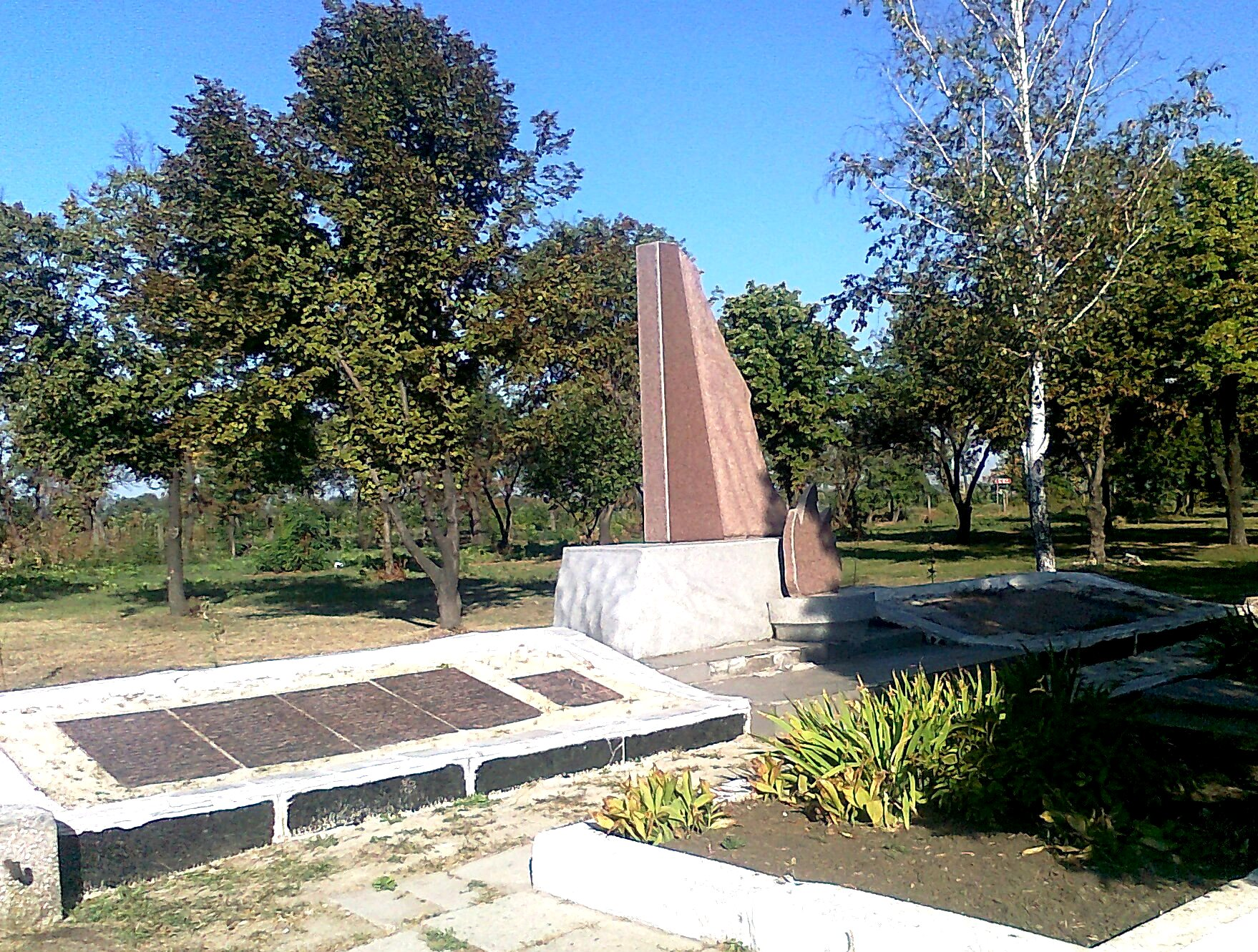
- Interactive map of Shevchenko
- Location of Shevchenko within Ukraine Shevchenko (Ukraine)
- Coordinates: 48°13′12″N 37°08′43″E
- Country: Ukraine
- Oblast: Donetsk Oblast
- Raion: Pokrovsk Raion
- Hromada: Pokrovsk urban hromada
- Founded: 1912
- Elevation: 167 m (548 ft)

Population (2022)
  - Total: 1,654
- Time zone: UTC+2 (EET)
  - Summer (DST): UTC+3 (EEST)
- Postal code: 85316—85318
- Area code: +380 6239

Shevchenko (Ukrainian: Шевченко) is a rural settlement in Pokrovsk urban hromada, Pokrovsk Raion, Donetsk Oblast, eastern Ukraine. Its population is approximately 1,654 (2022 estimate). The village is named after poet and artist Taras Shevchenko.

== Geography ==
Shevchenko is positioned approkimately 3 kilometers southwest of Pokrovsk. The total area of the town is 311.2 hectares. The town is situated on the highway T-0515. The town was founded on a significant coal deposit. The Solony river flows through the town and is the source of a reservoir.

== History ==
The village of Shevchenko was founded in 1911.

By 1918, the population of the village was 400 people, in 1959 – 5,500 people, since 1970 there has been a decrease in the population. Until 1921, the village was named — Lysa Hora, between 1921 and 1964 — Village No. 19-20.

Shevchenkivsk Village Council was established in 1943. There are no industrial, municipal or agricultural enterprises on the territory of the council. The Village Day is dedicated to Miner's Day.

=== Russo-Ukrainian War ===
During the Russian invasion of Ukraine, in early December 2024, the settlement came under high pressure by Russian forces, as they sought to advance on the flanks of Pokrovsk, trying to seize it with a turning maneuver from the south, as part of a broader offensive towards the city in the region.

On 7 December, the ISW assessed Russian forces to have advanced to the outskirts of the settlement. According to unconfirmed claims by Russian milbloggers, fighting was ongoing in the centre of the settlement.

On 9 December, Russian forces were confirmed to have reached the centre of Shevchenko. By 11 December, most of the settlement was confirmed captured, with the exception of the northern and northeastern outskirts. This advance brought Russian forces within 3 kilometres of Pokrovsk.

On 15 December, the UK Defence Intelligence reported that the settlement was likely captured, with Ukrainian news source Ukrainska Pravda confirming the Russian occupation.

== Demography ==
=== Population ===
Population change
1959	1970	1979	1989	2001
▲5 441	▼4 853	▼3 737	▼3 053	▼2 101
2003	2004	2005	2006	2007
▼2 064	▼2 023	▼1 984	▼1 936	▼1 901
2008	2009	2010	2011	2012
▼1 853	▼1 792	▲1 798	▼1 784	▲1 793
2013	2014	2015	2016	2017
▼1 786	▼1 774	▼1 755	▼1 734	▼1 707
2018	2019	2020	2021	2022
▼1 698	▼1 674	▲1 677	▲1 682	▼1 654

=== Language ===
Distribution of the population by native language according to the 2001 census:

Language	Number	Percentage
Russian	1255	59.71%
Ukrainian	844	40.14%
Belarusian	1	0.05%
Romanian	1	0.05%
Bulgarian	1	0.05%
Total	2102	100%

According to the 2001 census, the population of the village was 2,102 people, of whom 40.15% indicated Ukrainian as their native language, 59.71% — Russian, 0.05% — Belarusian, Romanian and Bulgarian. By 2011, the population of the village was 1,742 people.

== Infrastructure and economy ==
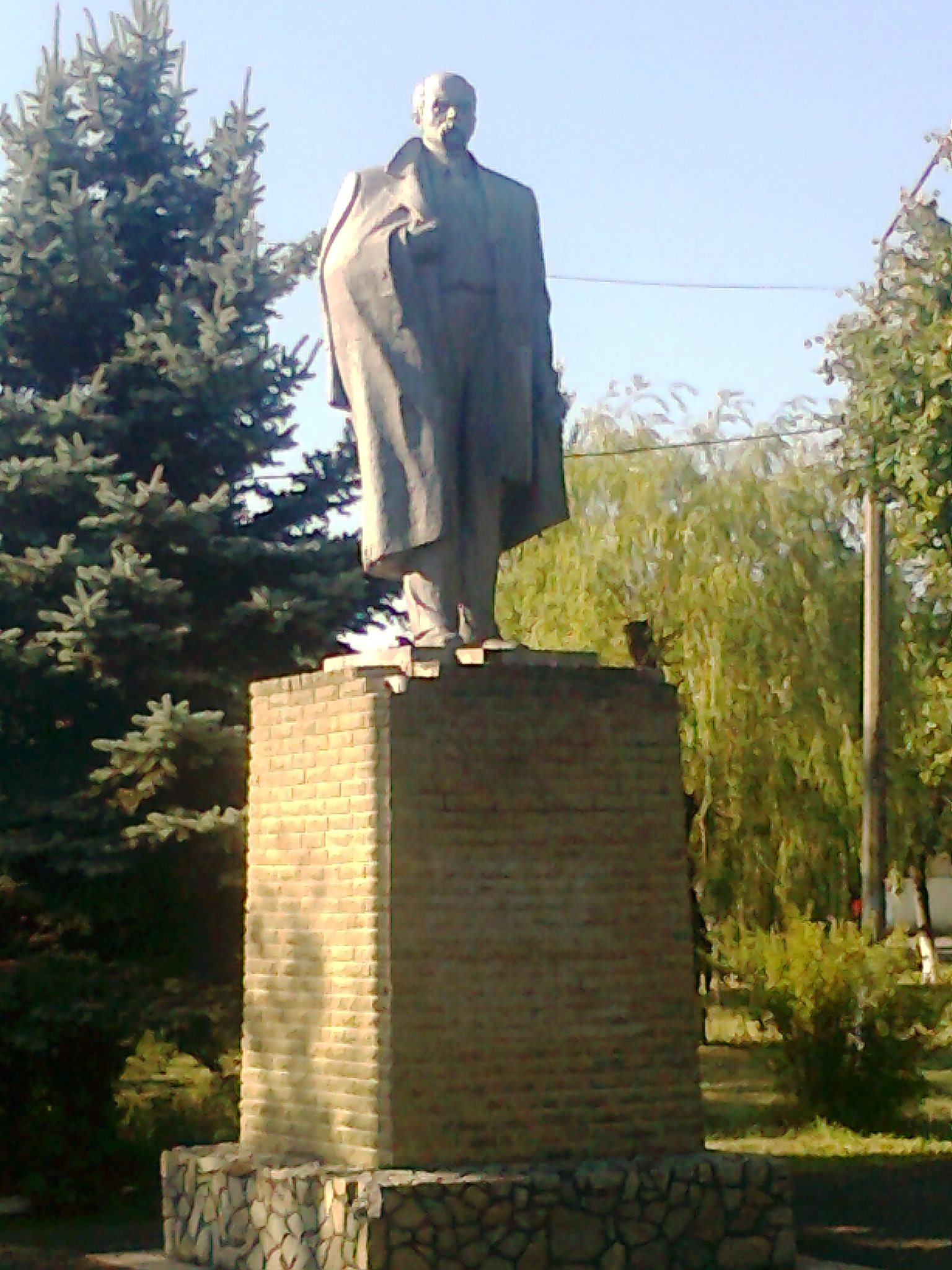
Taras Shevchenko statue in the village.

Shevchenko's main industry is coal mining, as it was founded on a significant coal deposit in the coal-rich Donets Basin. The town's main coal mine is Preobrazhensky mine. There are one industrial and six grocery stores on the territory of the village council, as well as the following:

- The T. G. Shevchenko Culture House, which is on the balance sheet of PJSC "SHU "Pokrovske";
- Preschool educational institution "Holubok", which is on the balance sheet of PJSC "SHU "Pokrovske", which is attended by 55 children;
- Secondary school I-III grades No. 33 of the Education Department of the Pokrovske City Council, where 147 students study;
- Outpatient clinic of the urban-type settlement named after T. G. Shevchenko;
- Ambulance brigade;
- Branch of the Savings Bank No. 2863/04;
- Communication department No. 20 of the structural unit of the Pokrovske postal service department of the Ukrainian State Postal Service Enterprise "Ukrposhta".
