= Shramkivka =

Village in Cherkasy Oblast, Ukraine

Shramkivka Шрамківка
- Village
- Location in Cherkasy Oblast Location in Ukraine
- Country: Ukraine
- Oblast: Cherkasy Oblast
- Raion: Zolotonosha Raion
- Hromada: Shramkivka rural hromada

Population (2017)
  - Total: 2,709
- Time zone: UTC+2 (EET)
  - Summer (DST): UTC+3 (EEST)

Coat of arms of Pavlo Polubotok

Shramkivka (Ukrainian: Шрамківка) is a village in Zolotonosha Raion of Cherkasy Oblast, Ukraine. Until 2017, it was an urban-type settlement. It hosts the administration of Shramkivka rural hromada, one of the hromadas of Ukraine. Population: 2,709 (2017 est.)

== History ==
Modern Shramkivka was formed on the basis of four ancient Cossack villages (khutors): Shramkivka, Polubotkivka, Shelykhovka and Ivanivka.

According to one of versions here in 1660 at khutor Polubotivka was born Ukrainian hetman Pavlo Polubotok).

Until 18 July 2020, Shramkivka belonged to Drabiv Raion. The raion was abolished in July 2020 as part of the administrative reform of Ukraine, which reduced the number of raions of Cherkasy Oblast to four. The area of Drabiv Raion was merged into Zolotonosha Raion.

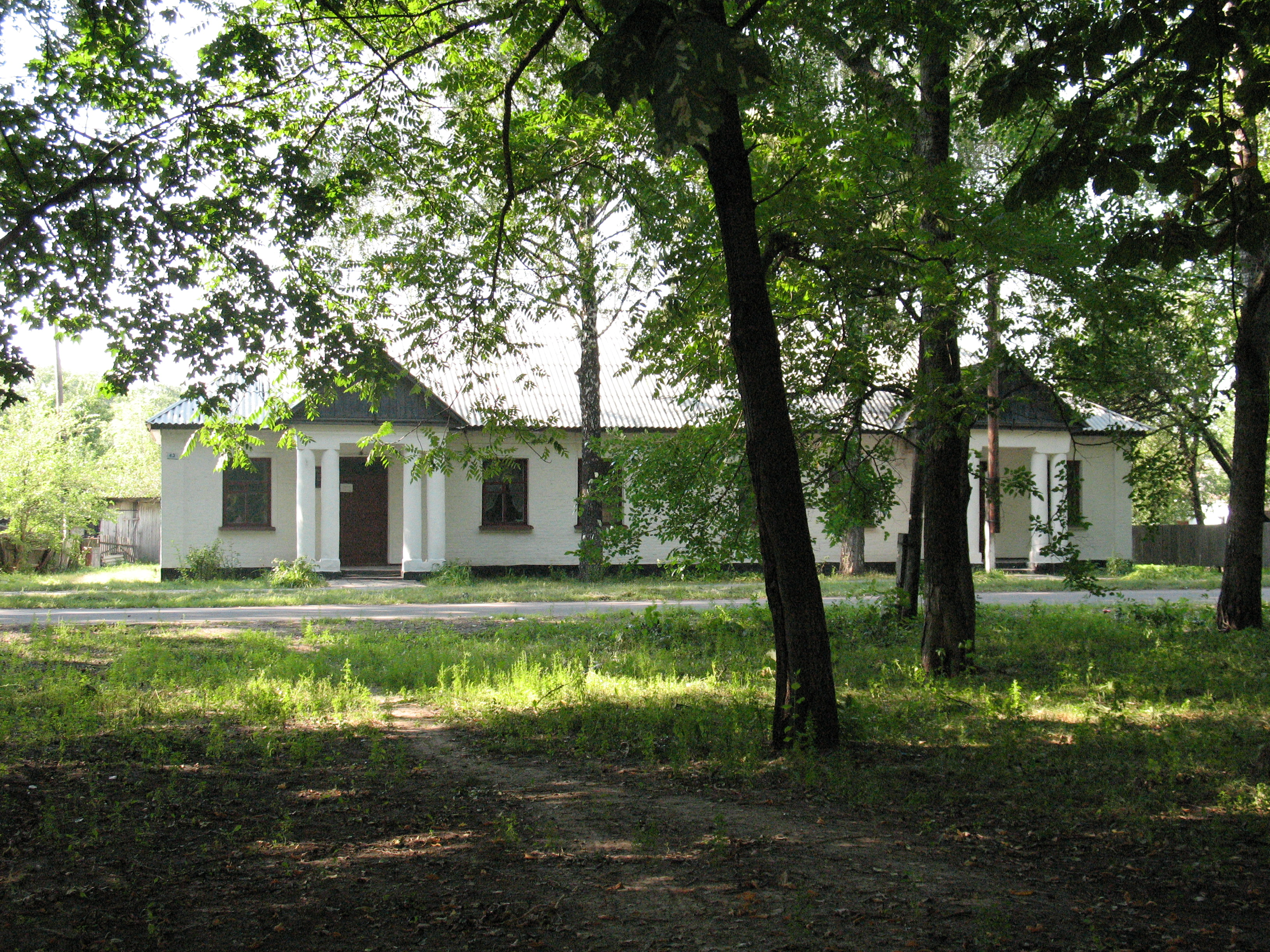
The village library, building of 1930s

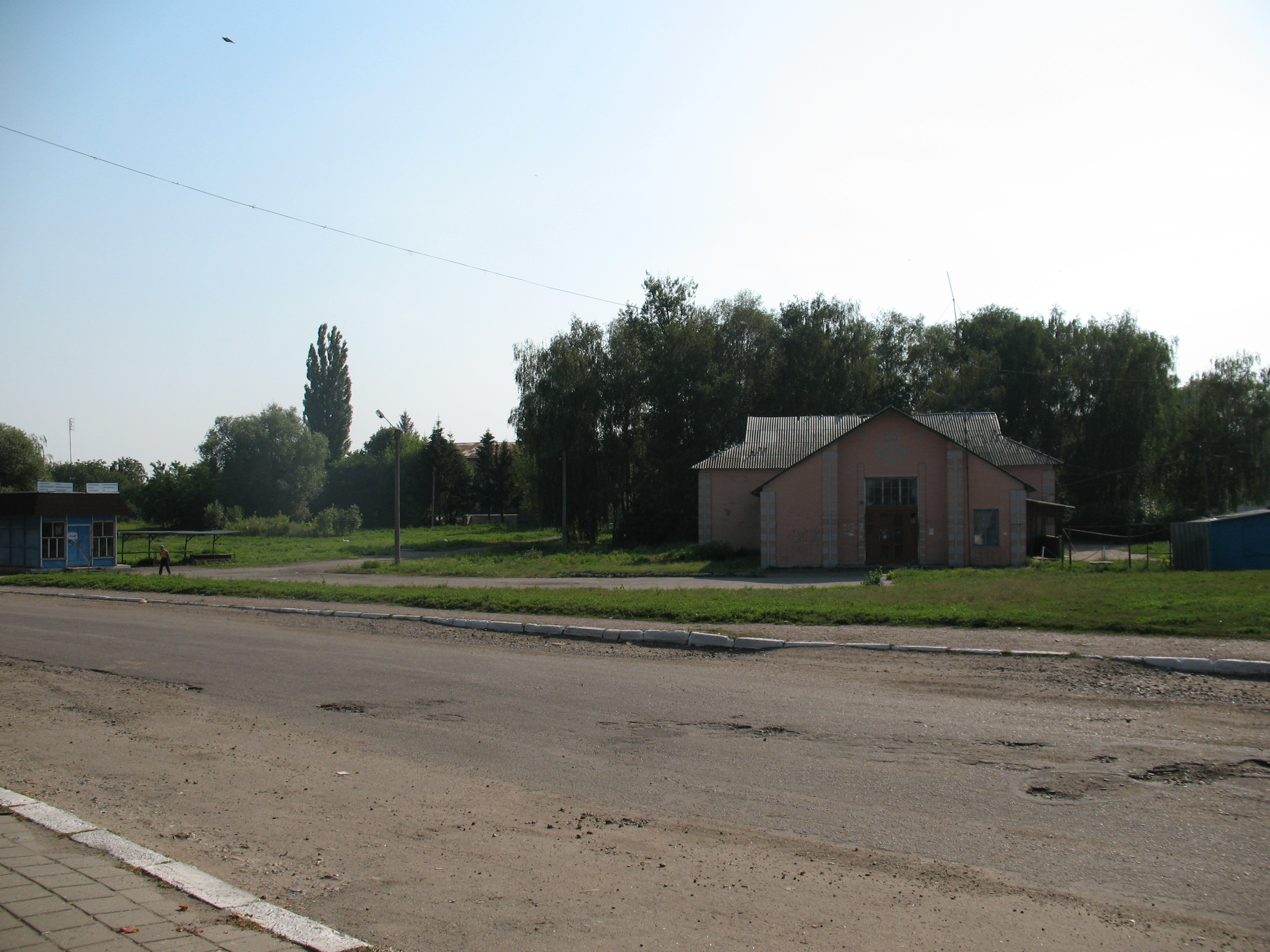
The center

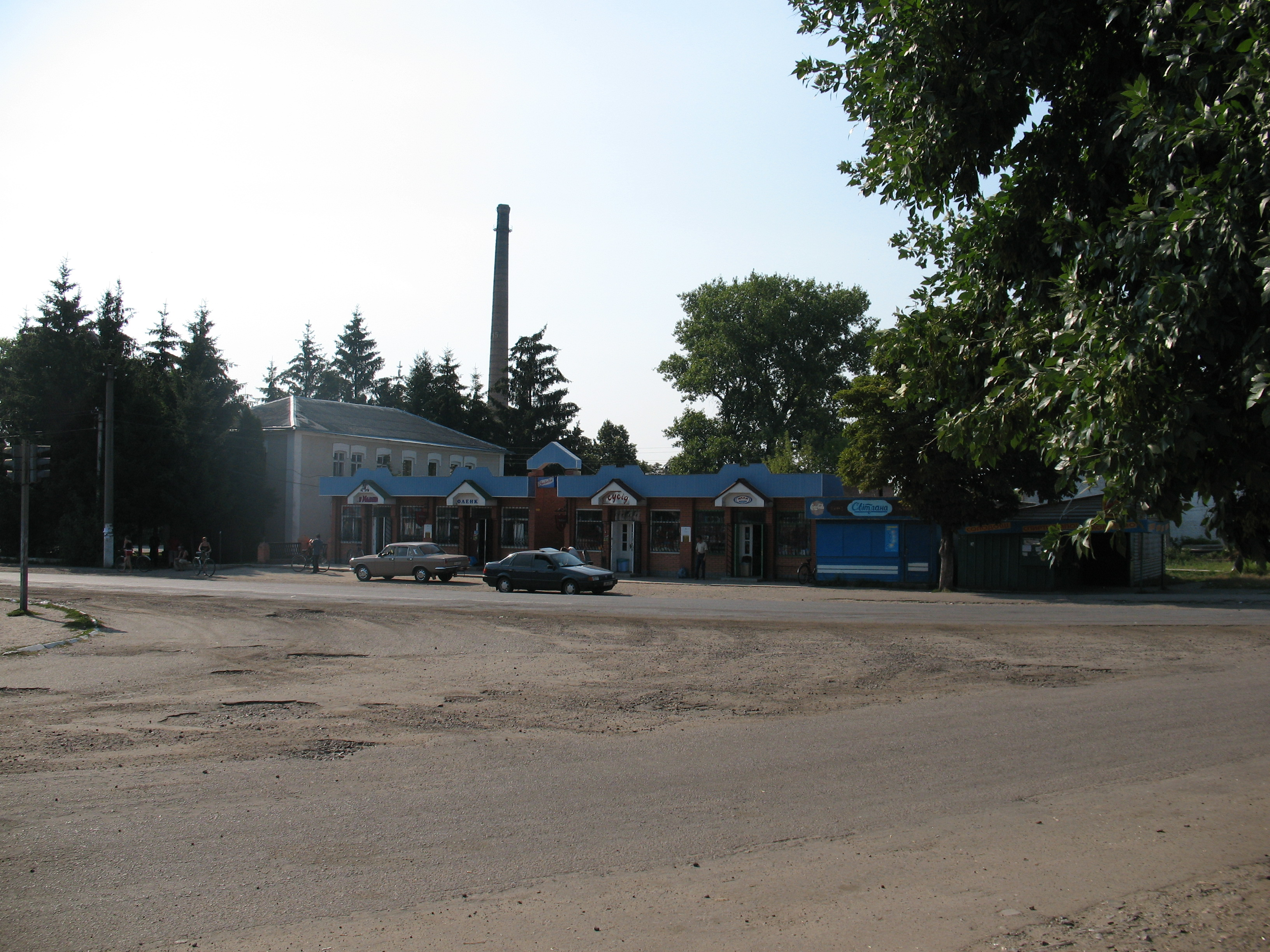
The center

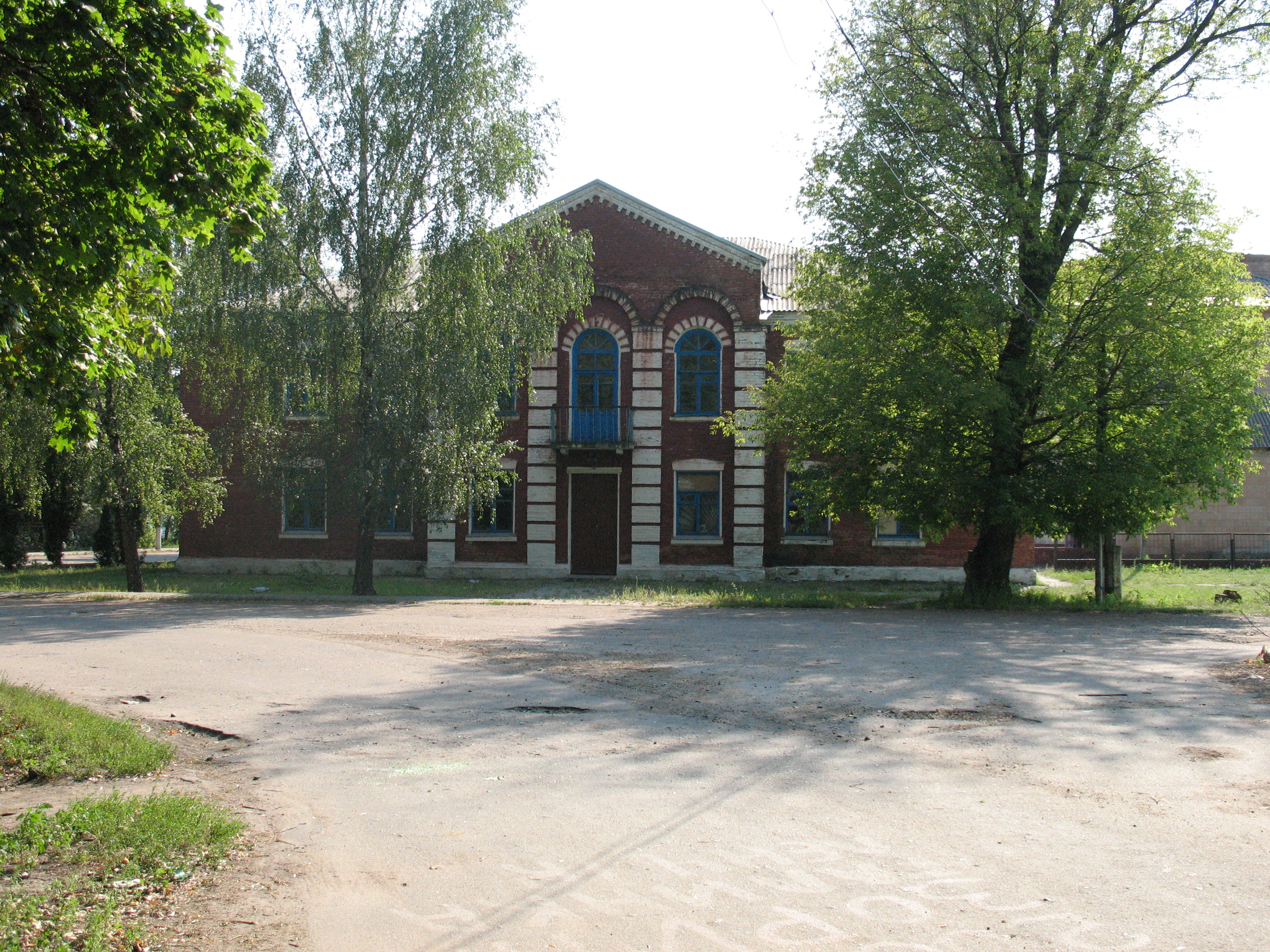
The school
