= Novoukrainka, Pokrovsk Raion, Donetsk Oblast =

Village in Donetsk Oblast, Ukraine

Novoukrainka Новоукраїнка
- Village
- Location of Novoukrainka within Ukraine Novoukrainka (Donetsk Oblast)
- Coordinates: 48°13′45″N 37°12′1″E
- Country: Ukraine
- Oblast: Donetsk Oblast
- Raion: Pokrovsk Raion
- Hromada: Pokrovsk urban hromada
- Elevation: 157 m (515 ft)

Population (2001 census)
  - Total: 34
- Time zone: UTC+2 (EET)
  - Summer (DST): UTC+3 (EEST)
- Postal code: 85363
- Area code: +380 623
- KATOTTH: UA14160210230093332

Novoukrainka is a village in Pokrovsk Raion, Donetsk Oblast.

== History ==
On 3 August 2025, geolocated footage showed that Russian forces had taken control of Novoukrainka.

== See also ==
- List of places in Ukraine
