= Aleksei Barannikov (linguist) =

Russian linguist of Indian languages (1890–1952)

Alekseĭ Petrovich Barannikov
- Born: 9 March 1890; Zolotonosha, Poltava Governorate, Russian Empire (now part of Cherkasy Oblast, Ukraine)
- Died: 5 September 1952 (aged 62); Leningrad (now Saint Petersburg, Russia)
- Citizenship: Russian citizen
- Education: Doctor of Science in Philology
- Occupations: Author, researcher, and indologist
- Writing career
- Language: Russian
- Notable awards: Order of Lenin

Alekseĭ Petrovich Barannikov (9 March 1890 – 5 September 1952) was a Russian linguist and eminent Russian Indologist. He was the founder-head of the Soviet School of Specialists on Indian Philology.

== Life ==
Alexei Petrovich Barannikov was born on 9 March 1890 in Zolotonosha, Poltava Governorate, Russian Empire (now part of Cherkasy Oblast, Ukraine). His father was a carpenter. In 1914 he graduated in History and Philology. Studied ancient, medieval, and Modern Indian Languages and ancient Indian literatures. He also studied the Romani dialects among the Roma of Ukraine and Russia. He earned a Doctor of Science degree in Philology.

He began his career as a teacher at Samara University in 1919. Joined Saratov State University in 1920. In 1922 he became Head of the Department of Indian Languages at Saint Petersburg State University and taught Indian languages and literature for life. Rabindra Puraskar The renowned Indologist Vera Aleksandravna Novikova, a Rabindra Puraskar awardee, earned her PhD under Aleksei Petrovich Barannikov for his work on Bankim Chandra. Russian Indologist Vasily Beskrovny (1908-1978) was one among his doctoral students.

As a linguist he was the head of Indian languages at the Leningrad Institute of Living Oriental Languages, (present day Institute of Oriental Studies of the Russian Academy of Sciences) from 1911 to 1938. In 1939, Barannikov became a member of the Academy of Sciences of the Soviet Union

== Works ==
- Hindustani (in Urdu and Hindi) in two volumes (1934)
- "Prem Sagar" (1937) Translation of Lalluji Lai
- Ramayana (1948) is a translation of Tulsi Das's work.
- Indiiskaia filologiia: Literaturovedenie (1959) Moscow – (Introduction to the literature on Indian linguistics in Russian)
- Fleksiia i analiz v novoindiiskikh iazykakh." Uch. zap. LGU: Seriia vostokovedcheskikh nauk, 1949, issue 1.

On the dialect, customs, folklore of the Roma of Ukraine and Russia, writes:

- Aleksei Petrovic Barannikov (1934). The Ukrainian and South Russian Gypsy Dialects. Publishing Office of the Academy. p. 226.

Further, Barannikov also wrote works on the language, the customs, the folklore, and the historiography of Romani peoples.

== Death ==
Barannikov died in Leningrad on 5 September 1952 aged 62.
