= Novoukrainka, Republic of Bashkortostan =

Novoukrainka Новоукраинка
- Village
- Location within Bashkortostan Location within Russia
- Coordinates: 52°05′N 58°35′E
- Country: Russia
- Region: Bashkortostan
- District: Khaybullinsky District
- Time zone: UTC+5:00

Novoukrainka (Russian: Новоукраинка) is a rural locality (a village) in Tanalyksky Selsoviet, Khaybullinsky District, Bashkortostan, Russia. The population was 233 as of 2010. There are 2 streets.

== Geography ==
Novoukrainka is located 38 km northeast of Akyar (the district's administrative centre) by road. Savelyevka is the nearest rural locality.
