= Gold of Polubotok =

Ukrainian folklore

The Gold of Polubotok (Ukrainian: Золото Полуботка, romanized: Zoloto Polubotka) is an unsubstantiated story of a large amount of gold which Ukrainian hetman Pavlo Polubotok supposedly deposited into an English bank in 1723, and which would have been returned upon the independence of Ukraine with an astronomical amount of interest.

== The legend ==
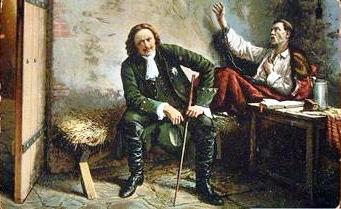
Peter I visiting Polubotok in a St. Petersburg prison in 1724

In 1723, Hetman Polubotok was recalled to Saint Petersburg by Tsar Peter I of Russia. The story holds that, suspecting his imminent arrest, Polubotok secretly deposited 200,000 gold rubles in the Bank of England at a 7.5% annual interest rate. The amount, the bank, and the interest rate vary in different versions: some sources cite one million gold rubles or a 2.5% annual interest rate, or the Bank of the British East India Company. In his will, Polubotok allegedly bequeathed eighty percent of the gold to a future independent Ukraine, and the rest to his successors.

== Russian Empire ==
The story first became widely known in 1907, when it was published in the Russian journal New Time by professor Alexander Rubets. In January 1908, a group of between 150 and 350 individuals met in Starodub, Chernigov Governorate, who called themselves the descendants of Polubotok. They formed a commission consisting of 25 people who unsuccessfully visited London in an attempt to retrieve the gold.

Another investigation was ordered by the Ministry of Foreign Affairs of Russia in the same year, but it also didn't find any evidence. Contemporary historian of the Cossack epoch, Dmytro Yavornytsky, considered the entire story to be a hoax.

== Soviet recovery attempts ==
In 1922, a man approached a Soviet embassy in Vienna, claiming to be a descendant of Polubotok. His claim was taken seriously, and Ukrainian consul Yuri Kotsiubynsky inquired about this issue to a Robert Mitchell, a representative of the Bank of England. Allegedly, the matter was monitored by the Chair of the Central Executive Committee of Ukraine, Grigory Petrovsky. The whole affair came to a halt with the establishment of the Soviet Union in December 1922, which abolished Ukrainian foreign representation.

The story resurfaced again in the 1960s. The KGB alleged that Britain was funding anti-Soviet activities among Ukrainian Americans that intensified after the administration of Dwight Eisenhower proclaimed Ukraine Day. The Soviets conducted a secret investigation with a team that included Ukrainian historian Olena Apanovych. The investigators believed that the gold was transported to England via Arkhangelsk in a cargo disguised as salt and salted fish.

== Ukraine ==
In the time of the Soviet Union's collapse, the story again attracted public attention. In May 1990, Ukrainian poet Volodymyr Tsybulko announced that if the gold were returned, it would amount to 38 kilograms for each citizen of independent Ukraine. This figure was achieved due to compounding of interest over hundreds of years. The interest in the Polubotok treasury coincided with a visit to Kyiv in 1990 of British Prime Minister Margaret Thatcher. The Ukrainian parliament ordered the creation of a special committee headed by the Vice Prime Minister of Ukraine, Dr. Petro Tronko, which visited London. The gold, however, has not been found. Later, Tsybulko admitted that the story was promoted mainly for propaganda purposes.

In 1993, Dovzhenko Film Studios produced a comedy movie, Forward, for the Hetman's treasures!, about the gold. The story reappeared in Ukrainian media again in 2007 with claims that Britain was ready to give Ukraine its gold back. In 2016, the Ukrainian press ran an April Fools' Day joke article referencing the legend.

== Bibliography ==
- Yekelchyk, Serhy (1998). "Cossack Gold: History, Myth, and the Dream of Prosperity in the Age of Post-Soviet Transition". Canadian Slavonic Papers. 40 (3–4): 311–325. doi:10.1080/00085006.1998.11092190.
- Kolyada, Ihor [in Ukrainian] (2015). Павло Тичина [Pavlo Tychyna] (in Ukrainian). Фоліо. ISBN 978-966-03-7248-1.
- Plokhy, Serhii (2012). The Cossack Myth. History and Nationhood in the Age of Empires. Cambridge University Press. ISBN 978-1-107-02210-2.
- Kasianov, Georgy [in Ukrainian] (2008). Украина 1991-2007: очерки новейшей истории [Ukraine 1991–2007: Essays on Modern History] (in Russian). Наш Час. ISBN 9789661530040.
