= Pavlo Polubotok =

Ukrainian Cossack leader (c. 1660–1724)

- Павло Полуботок
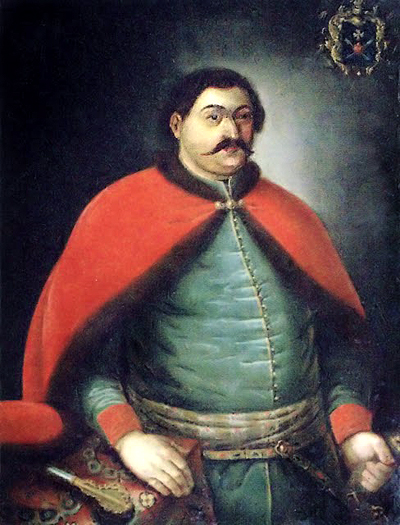
- Portrait, 18th–19th century

Acting Hetman of Left-bank Ukraine
- In office 1722–1724
- Preceded by: Ivan Skoropadsky
- Succeeded by: Office liquidated (Collegium of Little Russia); Danylo Apostol (1727)

Personal details
- Born: 1660 Borzna/Shramkivka, Cossack Hetmanate
- Died: 29 December 1724 (aged 63–64) Saint Petersburg, Russian Empire
- Spouse: Hanna Lazarevych
- Education: Kyiv Mohyla Academy
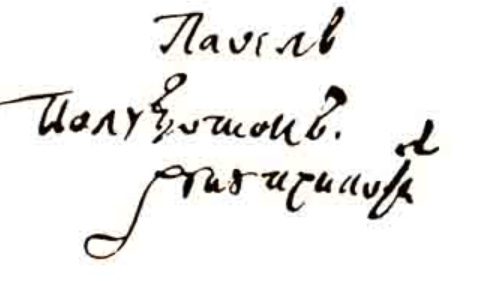
- Signature

Military service
- Years of service: 1706–1724
- Rank: Colonel
- Commands: Chernihiv regiment
- Battles/wars: Great Northern War

Pavlo Polubotok (Old Ukrainian: Павел(ъ) Полуботок(ъ), modern Ukrainian: Павло Леонтійович Полуботок, Russian: Павел Леонтьевич Полуботок, Polish: Paweł Połubotok; born c. 1660, died on 29 December 1724), was a Ukrainian Cossack political and military leader and Acting Hetman of Left-bank Ukraine between 1722 and 1724.

== Biography ==
Polubotok family coat of arms

Pavlo Polubotok was born around 1660 in Borzna (according to another version, at his family's khutor-farm Polubotivka, today part of Shramkivka) into a rich Cossack family and as a young man served under his relative Hetman Ivan Samoylovych.

In 1706 he became polkovnyk (colonel) of Chernigov Regiment and during the Great Northern War remained loyal to the Imperial Russians and fought against Ivan Mazepa. Pavel Polubotok was seen by many as a possible replacement for the disgraced Hetman, but the Russian Tsar Peter the Great distrusted Polubotok and supported Ivan Skoropadsky, who became the next Hetman. Nonetheless, Polubotok's loyalty was rewarded when wealthy estates throughout Ukraine were given to him.

In 1722, after the death of Skoropadsky, Pavlo Polubotok was named as his temporary replacement. As Hetman, Polubotok supported greater autonomy for Cossack Hetmante within the Russian Empire and defended the old privileges of the Cossack nobility. He wrote numerous petitions to Peter the Great asking him to re-instate the former way of electing the Hetman by the starshyna. In 1723 Alexander Rumyantsev was sent to Ukraine to investigate Polubotok. Within several months Polubotok was arrested, implicated in secret dealing with Pylyp Orlyk and accused of "treason." The Hetman was incarcerated in the Petropavlovsk fortress and died there less than a year later on 29 December 1724.

== Legacy ==
Historians are divided on Polubotok's legacy. Soviet historians saw him as a "greedy man who concentrated on overt class interests." Most modern Ukrainians consider him a martyr and a hero of the Ukrainian struggle for independence.

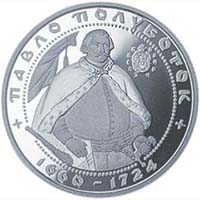
Ukrainian hryvnia coin depicting Pavlo Polubotok

Polubotok was mentioned in the poem Son ("A Dream", 1844) by Taras Shevchenko.

== Gold of Polubotok ==
The Gold of Polubotok is the legend of a large amount of gold which Hetman Polubotok supposedly deposited into an English bank in 1723, and which would have been returned upon the independence of Ukraine with an astronomical amount of interest. According to the story, being the head of state, Pavlo Polubotok had access to the state treasury. However, when he lost control and was forced to leave the country, he had put money from the treasury into the bank. In his will, Polubotok allegedly bequeathed eighty percent of the gold to a future independent Ukraine, and the rest to his successors. Even for today, a lot of Ukrainians know this story as an intriguing moment in Ukraine–United Kingdom relations.

The story first became widely known in 1907, when it was published in the Russian journal New Time by Professor Alexander Rubets.

== See also ==
- Hetmans of Ukrainian Cossacks
- Collegium of Little Russia (1722-27)
- History of Ukraine
- Gold of Polubotok
