= Chornobai Raion =

Former subdivision of Cherkasy Oblast, Ukraine

- Raion
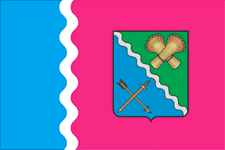
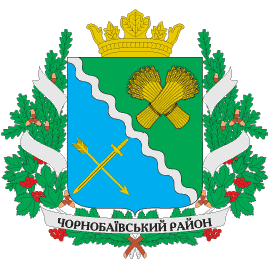
- Flag Coat of arms

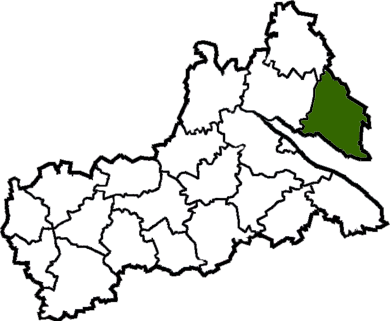
- Raion location in Cherkasy Oblast
- Coordinates: 49°34′6.3″N 32°29′4.6″E
- Country: Ukraine
- Region: Cherkasy Oblast
- Disestablished: 18 July 2020
- Admin. center: Chornobai
- Subdivisions: List: — city councils; — settlement councils; — rural councils; Number of localities: — cities; — urban-type settlements; — villages; — rural settlements

Area
  - Total: 1,554 km^{2} (600 sq mi)

Population (2020)
  - Total: 39,346
  - Density: 25.32/km^{2} (65.58/sq mi)
- Time zone: UTC+02:00 (EET)
  - Summer (DST): UTC+03:00 (EEST)
- Area code: +380

Chornobai Raion (Ukrainian: Чорнобаївський район) was a raion (district—administrative region) of eastern Cherkasy Oblast, in central Ukraine. Its administrative center was located in the urban-type settlement of Chornobai. The raion was abolished on 18 July 2020 as part of the administrative reform of Ukraine, which reduced the number of raions of Cherkasy Oblast to four. The area of Chornobai Raion was merged into Zolotonosha Raion. The last estimate of the raion population was 39,346 (2020 est.)

At the time of disestablishment, the raion consisted of two hromadas, Chornobai settlement hromada with the administration in Chornobai and Irkliiv rural hromada with the administration in the selo of Irkliiv.

== Geography ==
Chornobay Raion covered an area of 1,554 km^{2} — (600 sq mi).

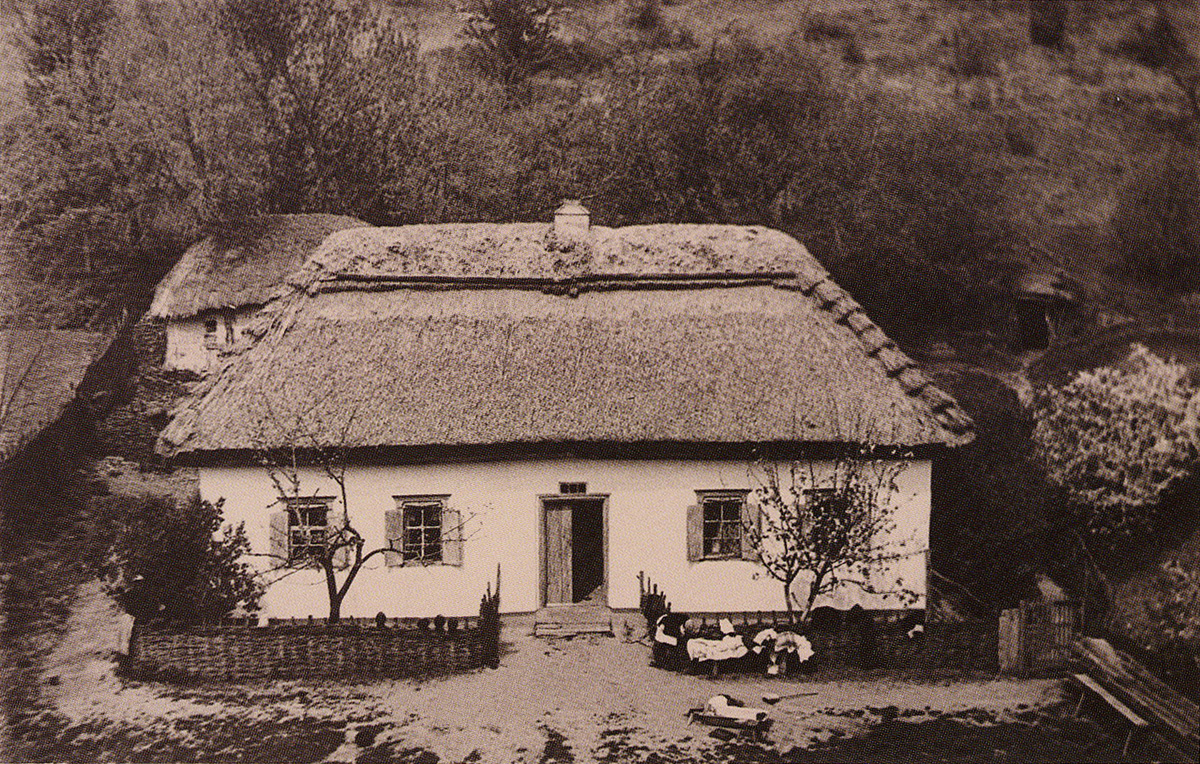
Traditional local 19th century house.
