= Zolotonosha Raion =

Subdivision of Cherkasy Oblast, Ukraine

Zolotonosha Raion Золотоніський район
- Raion
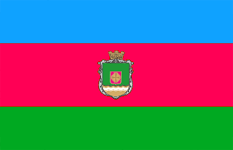
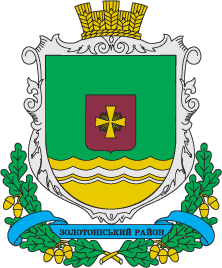
- Flag Coat of arms
- Coordinates: 49°43′1.5″N 31°58′55.4″E
- Country: Ukraine
- Oblast: Cherkasy Oblast
- Admin. center: Zolotonosha
- Subdivisions: 11 hromadas

Population (2022)
  - Total: 135,445
- Time zone: UTC+2 (EET)
  - Summer (DST): UTC+3 (EEST)

Zolotonosha Raion is a raion (district) of Cherkasy Oblast, central Ukraine. Its administrative centre is located at the city of Zolotonosha. Population: 135,445 (2022 estimate).

On 18 July 2020, as part of the administrative reform of Ukraine, the number of raions of Cherkasy Oblast was reduced to four, and the area of Zolotonosha Raion was significantly expanded. Two abolished raions, Chornobai and Drabiv Raions, as well as the city of Zolotonosha, which was previously incorporated as a city of oblast significance and did not belong to the raion, were merged into Zolotonosha Raion. The January 2020 estimate of the raion population was 39,349 (2020 est.).

== Subdivisions ==
=== Current ===
After the reform in July 2020, the raion consisted of 11 hromadas:

- Chornobai settlement hromada with the administration in the rural settlement of Chornobai, transferred from Chornobai Raion;
- Drabiv settlement hromada with the administration in the rural settlement of Drabiv, transferred from Drabiv Raion;
- Helmiaziv rural hromada with the administration in the selo of Helmiaziv, retained from Zolotonosha Raion;
- Irkliiv rural hromada with the administration in the selo of Irkliiv, transferred from Chornobai Raion;
- Nova Dmytrivka rural hromada with the administration in the selo of Nova Dmytrivka, retained from Zolotonosha Raion;
- Pishchane rural hromada with the administration in the selo of Pishchane, retained from Zolotonosha Raion;
- Shramkivka rural hromada with the administration in the selo of Shramkivka, transferred from Drabiv Raion;
- Velykyi Khutir rural hromada with the administration in the selo of Velykyi Khutir, transferred from Drabiv Raion;
- Voznesenske rural hromada with the administration in the selo of Voznesenske, retained from Zolotonosha Raion;
- Zolotonosha urban hromada with the administration in the city of Zolotonosha, transferred from Zolotonosha Municipality;
- Zorivka rural hromada with the administration in the selo of Zorivka, retained from Zolotonosha Raion.

=== Before 2020 ===
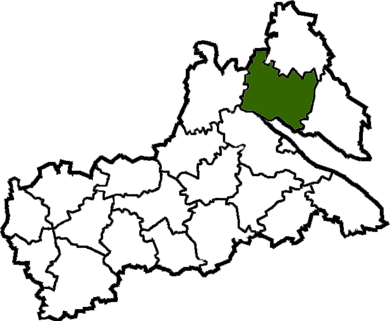
Zolotonosha Raion in Cherkasy Oblast (1966-2020)

Before the 2020 reform, the raion consisted of five hromadas:

- Helmiaziv rural hromada with the administration in Helmiaziv;
- Nova Dmytrivka rural hromada with the administration in Nova Dmytrivka;
- Pishchane rural hromada with the administration in Pishchane;
- Voznesenske rural hromada with the administration in Voznesenske;
- Zorivka rural hromada with the administration in Zorivka.
