= Ukrainian Canadians =

Canadian citizens of Ukrainian descent

Ukrainians of Canada Canadiens d'origine ukrainienne
українські канадці
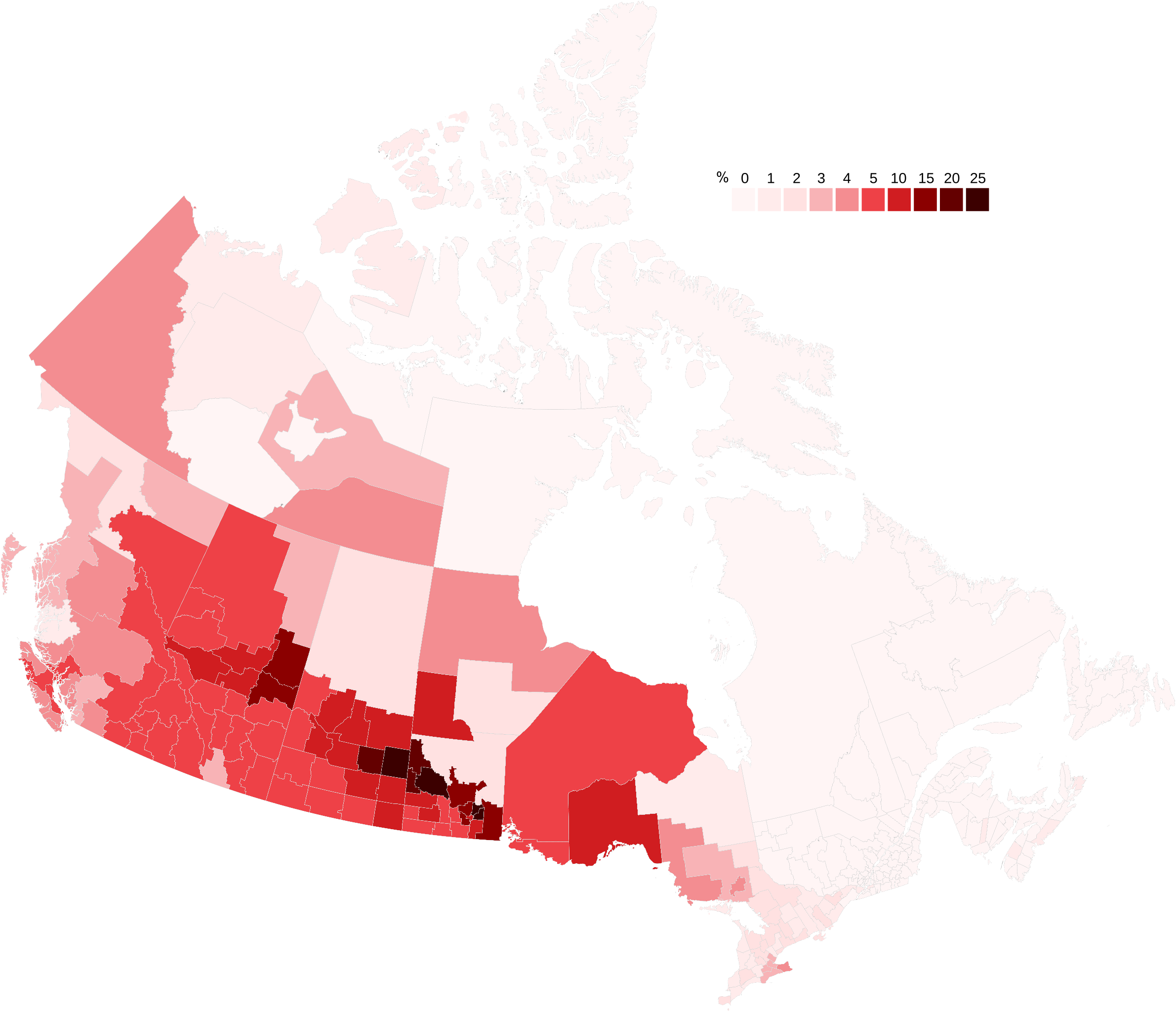
- Ukrainian Canadians as percent of population by census division (2021)

Total population
- 1,258,635 (by ancestry, 2021 Census)

Regions with significant populations
- Alberta: 343,640 (8.1%)
- Ontario: 342,260 (2.4%)
- British Columbia: 210,100 (4.2%)
- Manitoba: 165,305 (12.3%)
- Saskatchewan: 138,705 (12.2%)

Languages
- Canadian English, Canadian Ukrainian (also Quebec French, Ukrainian, Russian)

Religion
- Ukrainian Orthodox, Ukrainian Catholic, Roman Catholic, Baptists, Irreligious, Judaism

Related ethnic groups
- Polish Canadians, Ukrainian Americans, Ukrainians, Belarusian Canadians, other Slavs

Ukrainian Canadians (Note: French: Ukraino-Canadiens; Ukrainian: Українські канадці, Україноканадці, romanized: Ukraïns'kì kanadcì, Ukraïnokanadcì) are Canadian citizens of Ukrainian descent or Ukrainian-born people who immigrated to Canada.

In the late 19th century, the first Ukrainian immigrants arrived in the east coast of Canada. They were primarily farmers and labourers who were looking for a better life and economic opportunities. Most settled in the western provinces of Canada, particularly in Manitoba, Saskatchewan, and Alberta. These provinces offered fertile land and economic opportunities for farming, which was a familiar occupation for most Ukrainians. Ukrainian immigrants were able to establish a strong community in Canada. They built churches, community centres, and cultural organizations to preserve their language and traditions. After 1920 many moved to urban Ontario and Quebec.

During the early years of Ukrainian immigration to Canada, many immigrants faced discrimination and prejudice. Ukrainian immigrants were interned during World War I as a part of the confinement of those deemed to be "enemy aliens." Between 1914 and 1920, thousands of Ukrainian-Canadians were interned in camps.

Today, Ukrainian-Canadians continue to be an important part of Canada's cultural mosaic. They have made significant contributions to Canadian society and continue to preserve and celebrate their rich cultural heritage. In 2021, there were an estimated 1,258,635 persons of full or partial Ukrainian origin residing in Canada (the majority being Canadian-born citizens), making them Canada's eleventh largest ethnic group and giving Canada the world's third-largest Ukrainian population behind Ukraine itself and Russia. Self-identified Ukrainians are the plurality in several rural areas of Western Canada. According to the 2011 census, of the 1,251,170 who identified as Ukrainian, only 144,260 (or 11.5%) could speak the Ukrainian language (including the Canadian Ukrainian dialect).

Despite Canada's total population being only about one-tenth that of the United States, Ukrainian Canadians outnumber their American counterparts in absolute numbers. They are one of the few, if not the only, ethnic groups for which this is the case. In contrast, other groups—such as Indian, Chinese, Filipino, or Indigenous peoples—constitute a larger proportion of the population in Canada but are still numerically greater in the United States due to its much larger overall population.

== History ==
Ukrainian Canadian Population History
Year	Pop.	±%
1901	5,682	—
1911	75,432	+1227.6%
1921	106,721	+41.5%
1931	225,113	+110.9%
1941	305,929	+35.9%
1951	395,043	+29.1%
1961	473,337	+19.8%
1971	580,660	+22.7%
1981	529,615	−8.8%
1986	961,310	+81.5%
1991	1,054,295	+9.7%
1996	1,026,475	−2.6%
2001	1,071,060	+4.3%
2006	1,209,090	+12.9%
2011	1,251,170	+3.5%
2016	1,359,655	+8.7%
2021	1,258,635	−7.4%
Source: Statistics Canada Note1: 1981 Canadian census did not include multiple ethnic origin responses, thus population is an undercount. Note2: 1996–present census populations are undercounts, due to the creation of the "Canadian" ethnic origin category.

=== Unconfirmed settlement before 1891 ===
Minority opinions among historians of Ukrainians in Canada surround theories that a small number of Ukrainians settled in Canada before 1891. Most controversial is the claim that Ukrainians may have been infantrymen alongside Poles in the Swiss French “De Watteville's Regiment” who fought for the British on the Niagara Peninsula during the War of 1812 – it has been theorized that Ukrainians were among those soldiers who decided to stay in Upper Canada (southern Ontario). Other Ukrainians supposedly arrived as part of other immigrant groups; it has been claimed that individual Ukrainian families may have settled in southern Manitoba in the mid- to late 1870s alongside block settlements of Mennonites and other Germans from the Russian Empire. "Galicians" are noted as being among the miners of the British Columbia gold rushes and figure prominently in some towns in that new province's first census in 1871 (these may have been Poles and Belarusians as well as Ukrainians). Because there is so little definitive documentary evidence of individual Ukrainians among these three groups, they are not generally regarded as among the first Ukrainians in Canada.

=== First wave: Settlers, 1891–1914 ===
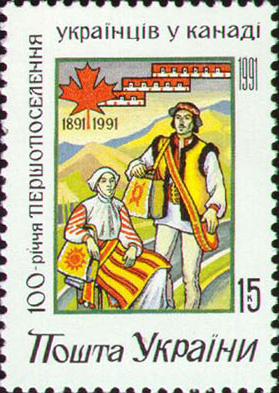
Post-independence Ukrainian fifteen-kopiyka stamp commemorating the centennial of Ukrainian settlement in Canada, 1891–1991

During the nineteenth century the territory inhabited by Ukrainians in Europe was divided between the Austro-Hungarian and Russian empires. The Austrian crownlands of Galicia and Bukovina were home to many Ukrainian speakers. Austrian Galicia was one of the poorest and most overpopulated regions in Europe, and had experienced a series of blights and famines. Emigration on a large scale from Galicia to the Balkans (the north-south border region of Croatia and Bosnia) and even to Brazil was already underway by 1891.

The first wave of Ukrainian immigration to Canada began with Iwan (Ivan) Pylypow and Wasyl Eleniak, who arrived in 1891, and brought several families to settle in 1892. Pylypow helped found the Edna-Star Settlement east of Edmonton, the first and largest Ukrainian block settlement. However, it is Dr Josef Oleskow, (Note: Dr. Oleskow, who had a PhD in agronomy, wrote two pamphlets – "About Free Lands" (Pro Vilni Zemli, spring 1895), and "On Emigration" (O emigratsiy, December 1895) – which were widely read in the Prosvita halls of the Ukrainian areas of the Austrian Empire.) along with Cyril Genik, who are considered responsible for the large Ukrainian Canadian population through their promotion of Canada as a destination for immigrants from western (Austrian-ruled) Ukraine in the late 1890s. Ukrainians from Central Ukraine, which was ruled by the Russian monarchy, also came to Canada – but in smaller numbers than those from Galicia and Bukovina. Approximately 170,000 Ukrainians from the Austro-Hungarian Empire arrived in Canada from September 1891 to August 1914.

Clifford Sifton, Canada's Minister of the Interior from 1896 to 1905, also encouraged Ukrainians from Austria-Hungary to immigrate to Canada since he wanted new agricultural immigrants to populate Canada's prairies. After retirement, Sifton defended the new Ukrainian and East European immigrants to Canada – who were not from the United Kingdom, the United States, Scandinavia, Iceland, France or Germany – by stating:

I think that a stalwart peasant in a sheepskin coat, born to the soil, whose forefathers have been farmers for ten generations, with a stout wife and a half-dozen children, is good quality.

This Ukrainian immigration to Canada was largely agrarian, and at first Ukrainian Canadians concentrated in distinct block settlements in the parkland belt of the prairie provinces: Alberta, Saskatchewan, and Manitoba. While the Canadian Prairies are often compared to the steppes of Ukraine, the settlers came largely from Galicia and Bukovina – which are not steppe lands, but are semi-wooded areas in the foothills of the Carpathian Mountains. This is why Ukrainians coming to Canada settled in the wooded aspen parklands – in an arch from Winnipeg and Stuartburn, Manitoba to Edmonton and Leduc, Alberta – rather than the open prairies further south. Furthermore, the semi-feudal nature of land ownership in the Austrian Empire meant that in the "Old Country" people had to pay the pan (landlord) for all their firewood and lumber for building. Upon arriving in Canada, the settlers often demanded wooded land from federal Dominion Lands Act registry officials so that they would be able to supply their own needs, even if this meant taking land that was less productive for crops. They also attached deep importance to settling near to family, people from nearby villages or other culturally similar groups, furthering the growth of the block settlements.

Fraternal and benevolent organizations established by these settlers include the Ukrainian Labour Farmer Temple Association (ULFTA, affiliated with the Communist Party of Canada), the Ukrainian Catholic Brotherhood (UCB, affiliated with the Ukrainian Catholic Church in Canada), and the Ukrainian Self-League (USRL, affiliated with the Ukrainian Orthodox Church of Canada). The ULFTA transformed itself into the Association of United Ukrainian Canadians in 1946, the UCB and USRL are member organizations of the Ukrainian Canadian Congress today.

By 1914, there were also growing communities of Ukrainian immigrants in eastern Canadian cities, such as Toronto, Montreal, Hamilton, and Windsor. Many of them arrived from the provinces of Podillia, Volhynia, Kyiv and Bessarabia in Russian-ruled Ukraine. In the early years of settlement, Ukrainian immigrants faced considerable amounts of discrimination at the hands of Northern European Canadians, an example of which was the internment.

=== Internment (1914–1920) ===
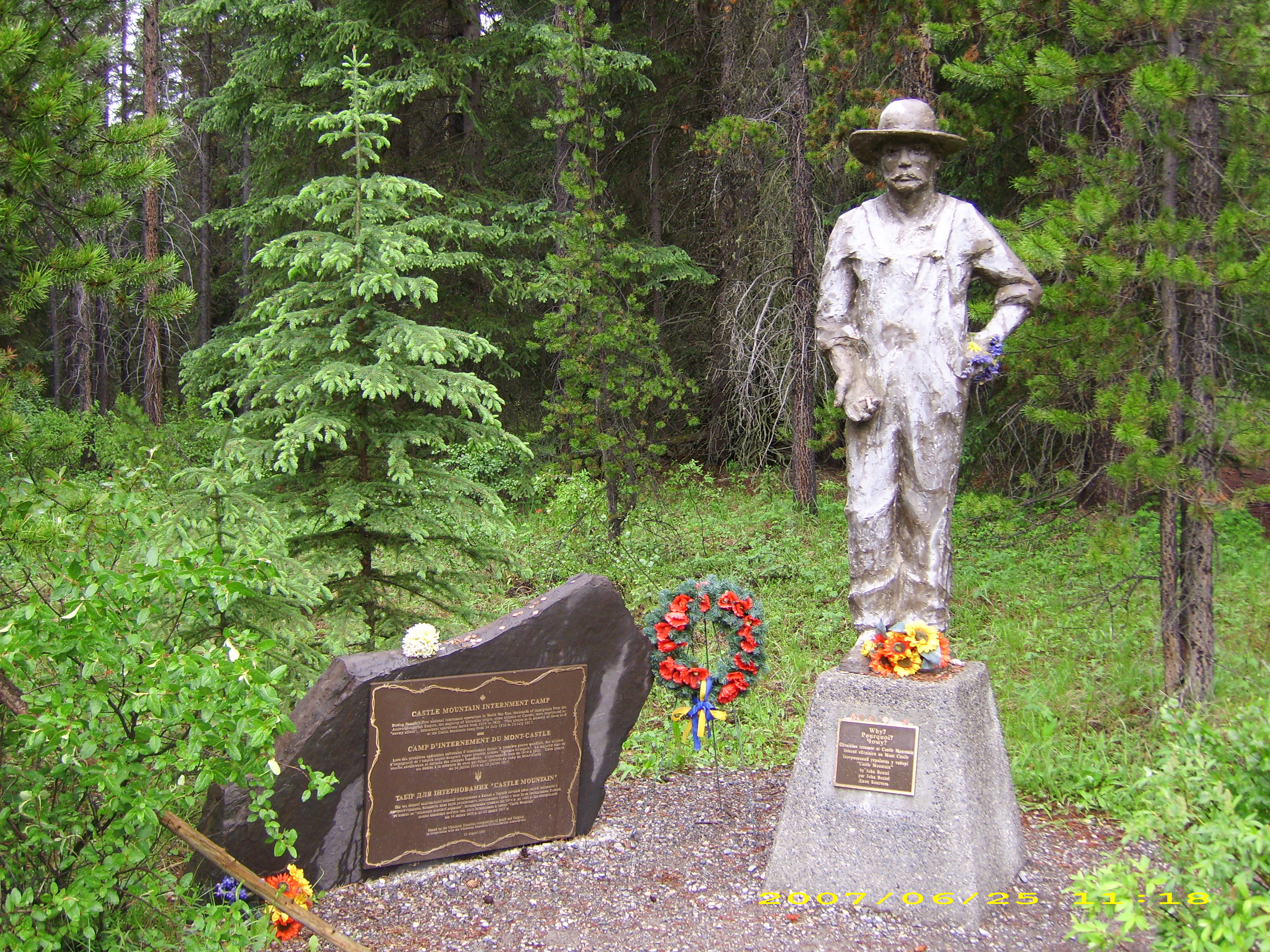
Commemorative plaque and a statue entitled "Why?" / "Pourquoi?" / "Чому (Chomu)?", by John Boxtel at the location of the Castle Mountain Internment Camp, Banff National Park

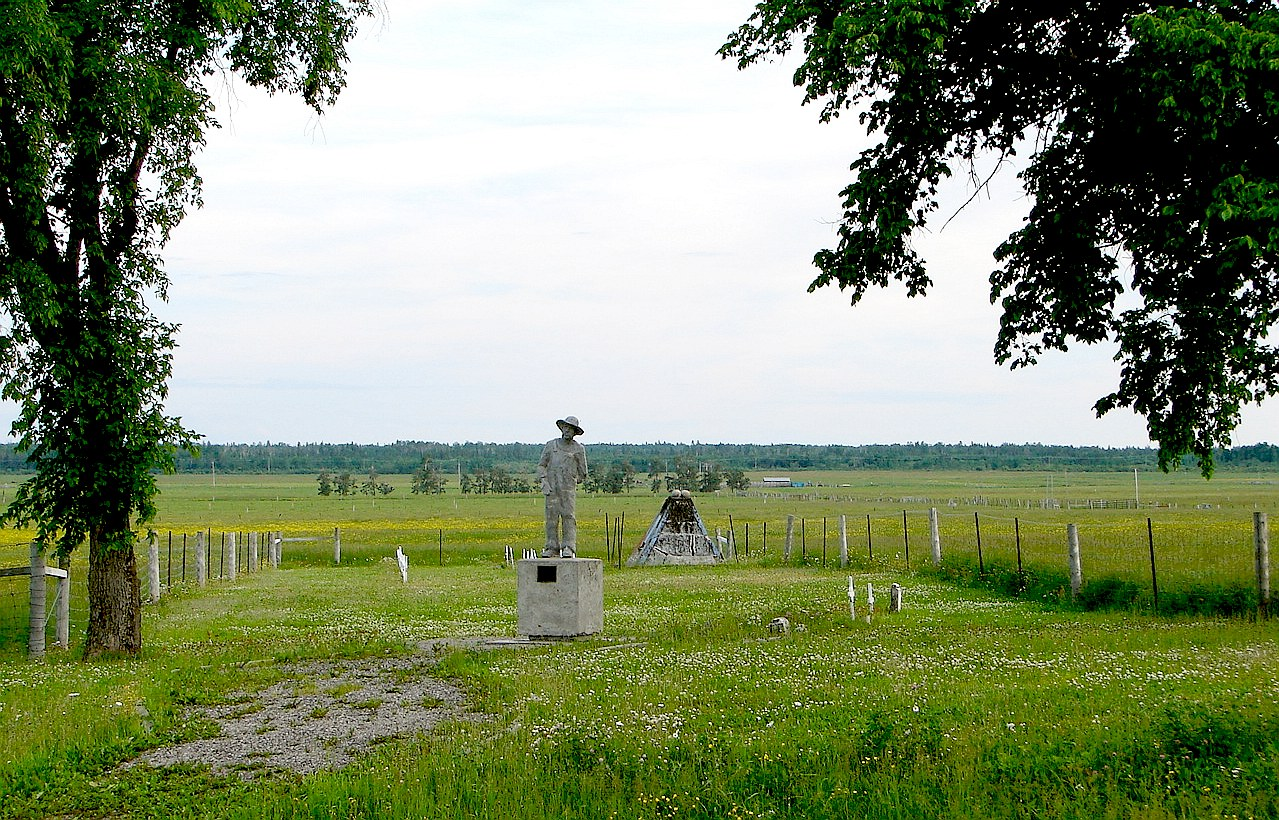
Commemorative statue entitled "Never Forget" / "Ne Jamais Oublier" / "Ніколи Не Забути (Nikoly Ne Zabuty)", by John Boxtel; and damaged plaque at the cemetery of the Kapuskasing Internment Camp, Kapuskasing, northern Ontario

From 1914 to 1920, the political climate of the First World War allowed the Canadian government to classify immigrants with Austro-Hungarian citizenship as "aliens of enemy nationality". This classification, authorized by the August 1914 War Measures Act, permitted the government to legally compel thousands of Ukrainians in Canada to register with federal authorities. About 5,000 Ukrainian men, and some women and children, were interned at government camps and work sites. Although many Ukrainians were "paroled" into jobs for private companies by 1917, the internment continued until June 20, 1920 – almost a year after the Treaty of Versailles was signed by Canada on June 28, 1919.

There are some two dozen Ukrainian-specific plaques and memorials in Canada commemorating Canada's first national internment operations, including several statues – on the fairgrounds of Canada's National Ukrainian Festival south of Dauphin, Manitoba, the grounds of the Manitoba Legislative Building in Winnipeg; and at the locations of the former internment camps in Banff National Park, Alberta, Spirit Lake (La Ferme), Quebec, and Kapuskasing, Ontario. Most were placed by the Ukrainian Canadian Civil Liberties Association (UCCLA) and its supporters. On August 24, 2005, Prime Minister Paul Martin recognized the Ukrainian Canadian internment as a "dark chapter" in Canadian history, and pledged $2.5 million to fund memorials and educational exhibits although that funding was never provided.

On May 9, 2008, following the 2005 passage of Inky Mark's Bill C-331, the Government of Canada, under Prime Minister Stephen Harper, established a $10 million fund following several months of negotiation with the Ukrainian Canadian community's representatives, including the UCCLA, Ukrainian Canadian Congress and Ukrainian Canadian Foundation of Taras Shevchenko (also known as the Shevchenko Foundation), establishing the Canadian First World War Internment Recognition Fund (CFWWIRF). The Endowment Council of the CFWWIRF uses the interest earned on that amount to fund projects that commemorate the experience of Ukrainians and other Europeans interned between 1914 and 1920. The funds are held in trust by the Shevchenko Foundation. Amongst the commemorative projects funded by the Endowment Council was the unveiling, simultaneously across Canada, of 115 bilingual plaques on August 24, 2014, recalling the 100th anniversary of the first implementation of the War Measures Act. This was known as Project "Сто" (translit. Sto; meaning "one hundred"), and organized by the UCCLA.

=== Second wave: Settlers, workers and professionals, 1923–1939 ===
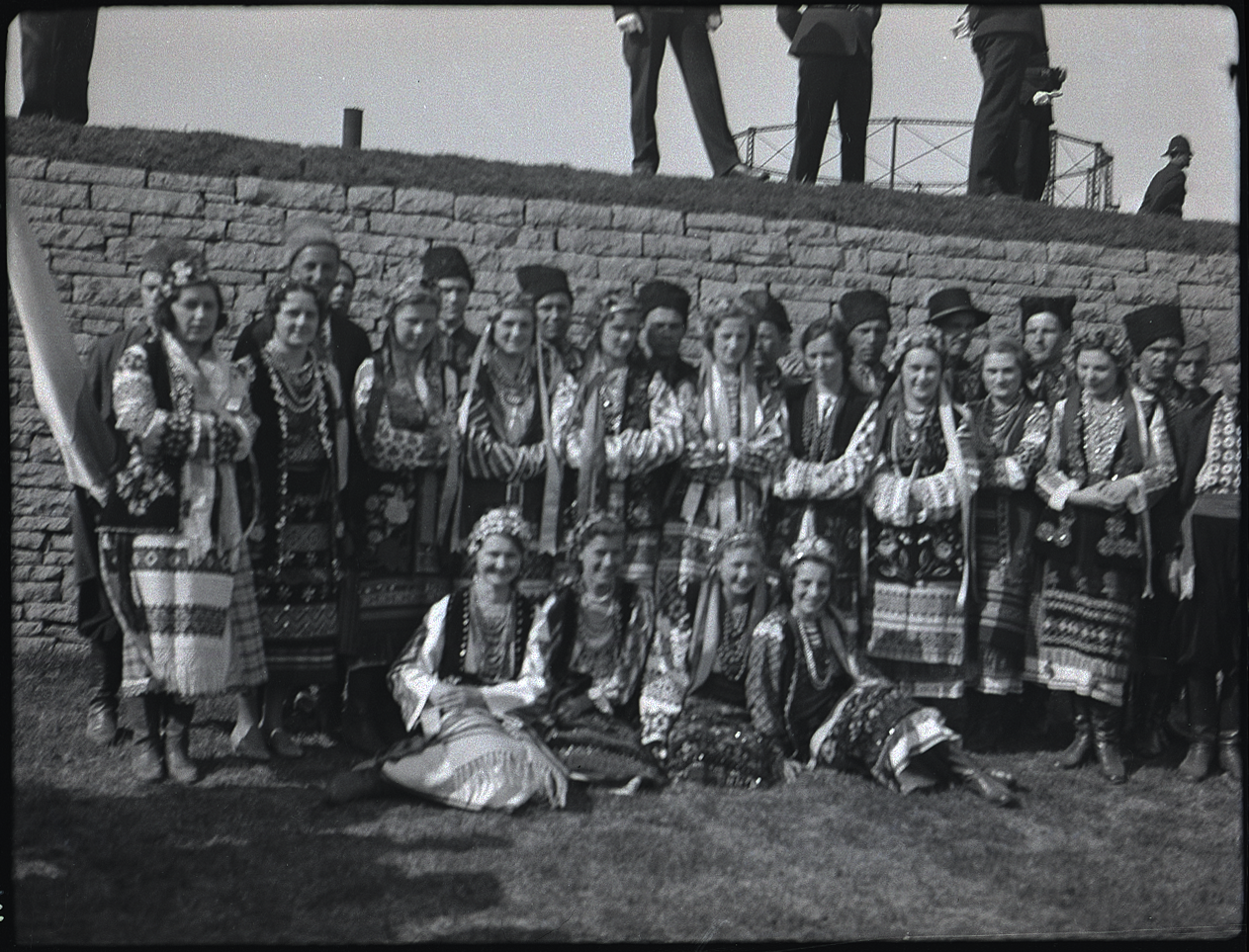
A group of Ukrainian Canadians pictured at a celebration inside Toronto's Old Fort York, taken in May 1934. Photograph from the M.O. Hammond fonds held at the Archives of Ontario.

In 1923, the Canadian government modified the Immigration Act to allow former subjects of the Austrian Empire to once again enter Canada – and Ukrainian immigration started anew. Ukrainians from western Volhynia – the Polesie and Wołyń Voivodeships (under Polish rule), and southern Bessarabia – also known as the Budjak (under Romanian rule), joined a new wave of emigrants from Polish-governed Galicia and Romanian-governed Bukovina. Around 70,000 Ukrainians from Poland, Romania, and Czechoslovakia arrived in Canada from 1923 to September 1939, although the flow decreased severely after 1930 due to the Great Depression.

Relatively little farmland remained unclaimed – the majority in the Peace River region of northwestern Alberta – and less than half of this group settled as farmers in the Prairie provinces. The majority became workers in the growing industrial centres of southern Ontario, the Montreal region and the Eastern Townships of Quebec; the mines, smelters and forests of northern Ontario; and the small heavy industries of urban western Canada. A few Ukrainian professionals and intellectuals were accepted into Canada at this time; they later became leaders in the Ukrainian Canadian community.

The second wave was heavily influenced by the struggle for Ukrainian independence during the Russian Civil War, and established two competing fraternal / benevolent organizations in Canada: the United Hetman Organization (UHO) in 1934 – which supported the idea of a Ukrainian "Cossack kingdom" led by Pavlo Skoropadskyi; and the rival Ukrainian National Federation (UNF) in 1932 – which supported the idea of an independent Ukrainian republic and politically supported the armed Ukrainian nationalist insurgency in Polish-occupied Western Ukraine. The UHO ceased to exist by 1960, while the UNF continued to expand and became the largest and most influential Ukrainian organization in Canada, spearheading the creation of the coordinating Ukrainian Canadian Committee (later Ukrainian Canadian Congress) during World War II. (Note: The UCC was the driving force in organizing the global umbrella World Congress of Free Ukrainians in the immediate postwar period; the WCFU would expand and be renamed the Ukrainian World Congress after the dissolution of the Soviet Union.)

=== Third wave: Workers, professionals and political refugees, 1945–1980s ===
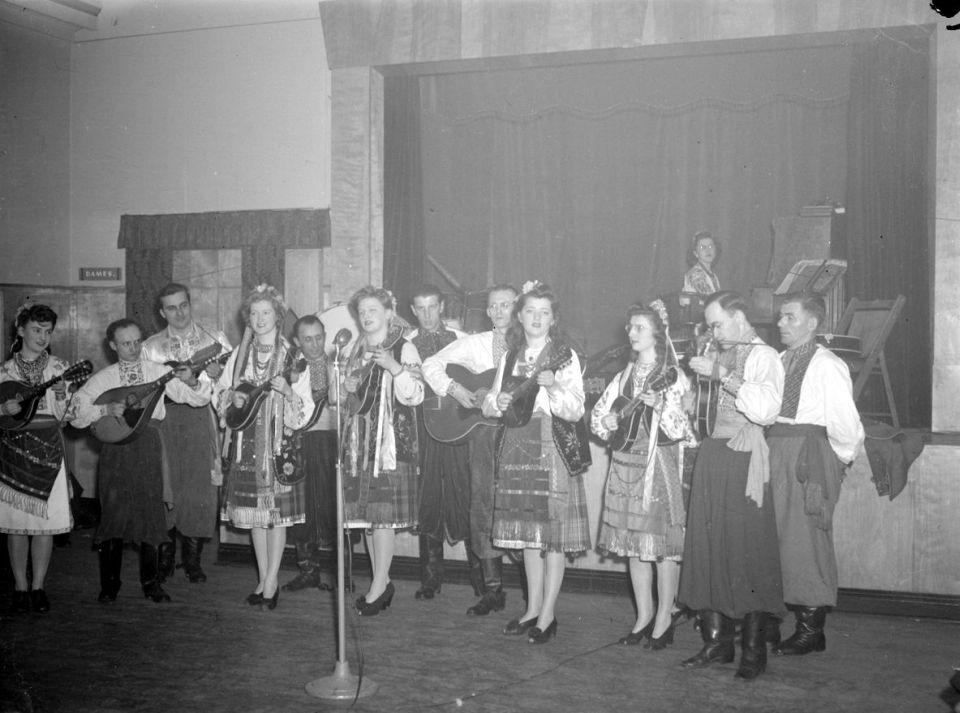
Ukrainian Mandolin Orchestra in May 1945

From 1945 to 1952, most Ukrainians coming to Canada were political refugees and Displaced Persons. In the aftermath of the Second World War, many Ukrainians who had been displaced by the war began to immigrate to Canada. These immigrants were often refugees who had been forced to flee their homes and were looking for a safe haven. In the 1950s and 1960s, many Ukrainians who had been living in displaced persons camps in Europe were given the opportunity to immigrate to Canada. These immigrants were often highly skilled and educated, and they contributed to the growth and development of Canada's economy.

Another wave of Ukrainian immigration occurred in the 1970s and 1980s, driven by political and economic factors. Many Ukrainians were dissatisfied with the Soviet regime and its policies, and were looking for greater freedoms and opportunities. Additionally, economic factors such as a shortage of jobs and a declining standard of living also played a role in driving migration.

During this period, many Ukrainian immigrants settled in urban areas, such as Toronto and Montreal, and found work in manufacturing and other industries. Despite facing some challenges with discrimination and prejudice, Ukrainian immigrants were able to establish strong communities in Canada and preserve their culture and heritage. The result was large Ukrainian communities in Toronto, Montreal and Vancouver. They established a number of new organizations and affiliated newspapers, women's and youth groups, the most prominent of which was the Canadian League for the Liberation of Ukraine (renamed the League of Ukrainian Canadians after the collapse of the USSR in 1991). The League joined the Ukrainian Canadian Committee (later Ukrainian Canadian Congress) as a member organization in 1959.

=== Fourth wave: Post-independence immigrants, 1991–2021 ===
After the dissolution of the Soviet Union in 1991, emigration from Ukraine increased. Rising levels of corruption, the dismantlement of some social services, low-paying employment as well as a loss of jobs in Ukraine, made immigration attractive once again. Many Ukrainians saw Canada as a land of opportunity and a place where they could build a better life for themselves and their families. The Canadian government also made it easier for Ukrainians to immigrate, offering various programs and initiatives designed to attract skilled workers and entrepreneurs. One of the most popular programs for Ukrainian immigrants was the Federal Skilled Worker Program, which allowed skilled workers to immigrate to Canada based on their education, work experience, language proficiency, and other factors. Many Ukrainians also immigrated to Canada through family sponsorship, as they had family members already living in Canada. In addition to economic opportunities, Ukrainians were also attracted to Canada's multicultural society and the freedom and rights afforded to its citizens. Many Ukrainian immigrants have made significant contributions to Canadian society in various fields, including business, academia, politics, and the arts.

=== Post-2022 migration ===
In early 2022, Russia began building up troops on Ukraine's border and on February 24, invaded Ukraine, starting a full-scale war. In response to the resulting Ukrainian refugee crisis, Canadian government introduced a temporary visa program, Canada–Ukraine authorization for emergency travel. In total, 1,189,320 applications were received, of which 962,612 (approximately 80.94%) were approved. As of April 1, 2024, 298,128 people had arrived in Canada under the CUAET program.

== Participation in the Canadian economy ==
In the first half of the twentieth century, Ukrainian Canadians overwhelmingly earned their livings in primary industry – predominantly in agriculture, but also in mining, logging, construction, and the extension of the Canadian railway system; most importantly as labour in completing the transcontinental mainlines of the Canadian Northern Railway and Grand Trunk Pacific, both then nationalized and consolidated into the Canadian National Railway (CN). As agriculture became more mechanized and consolidated, male Ukrainian Canadians shifted into non-farm primary and secondary industry jobs, while women took jobs in domestic work and unskilled service industries. By 1971, only slightly more Ukrainian Canadians worked in agriculture than in the wider Canadian labour force. While they remain somewhat over-represented in agriculture today (7% versus 4% of all working Canadians) and underrepresented in elite managerial positions, Ukrainian Canadians have largely assimilated more into the broader economy, such that the Ukrainian Canadian workforce is now similar to that of Canada as a whole in nearly all other respects.

== Demographics ==
View source data.
Canadians of Ukrainian descent total population (1901–2016)
Note1: 1981 Canadian census did not include multiple ethnic origin responses, thus population is an undercount.
Note2: 1996–present census populations are undercounts, due to the creation of the "Canadian" ethnic origin category.
View source data.
Canadians of Ukrainian descent percentage of the total population (1901–2016)
Note1: 1981 Canadian census did not include multiple ethnic origin responses, thus population is an undercount.
Note2: 1996–present census populations are undercounts, due to the creation of the "Canadian" ethnic origin category.

=== Population ===
Ukrainian Canadian Population History 1901−2021
Year	Population	% of total population
1901	5,682	0.106%
1911	75,432	1.047%
1921	106,721	1.214%
1931	225,113	2.169%
1941	305,929	2.659%
1951	395,043	2.82%
1961	473,337	2.595%
1971	580,660	2.692%
1981	529,615	2.199%
1986	961,310	3.842%
1991	1,054,295	3.906%
1996	1,026,475	3.598%
2001	1,071,060	3.614%
2006	1,209,090	3.87%
2011	1,251,170	3.808%
2016	1,359,655	3.946%
2021	1,258,635	3.402%

=== Language ===
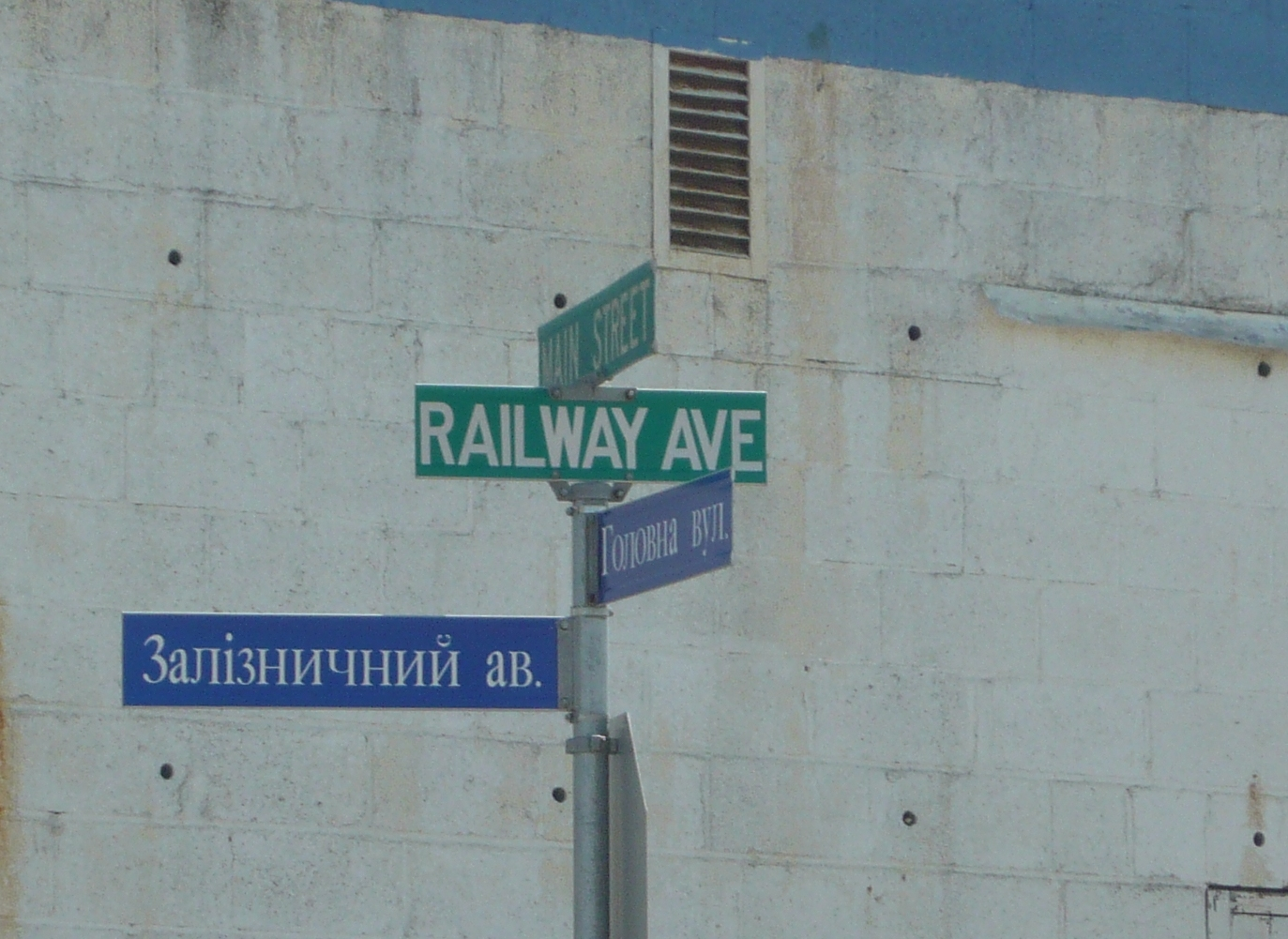
Ukrainian language street signs alongside English ones in Hafford, Saskatchewan

In addition to the official English and French languages, many prairie public schools offer Ukrainian language education for children, including immersion programs. Generally second language students are taught the local Canadian Ukrainian dialect, rather than Standard Ukrainian.

The Canadian Ukrainian dialect is based on the Ukrainian spoken by the first wave of immigrants from the Austro-Hungarian Empire from 1891 to 1914. Because the Ukrainian language of this era had no words for such things as agricultural machinery other than a plow, words for wildlife or vegetation common to North America and uncommon in Ukraine, words related to the automobile or other self-propelled vehicles on roads, or words for internal combustion engine-powered or electrically-powered tools or home appliances of any kind, extensive borrowings and adaptations from Canadian English were independently made by Ukrainian settlers in the block settlements of the Prairies during their first decades in Canada. The decline of regular communication with relatives in Ukraine, especially the severe restrictions between 1939 and 1989, further isolated the Western Canadian Ukrainian dialect from an evolving Ukrainian language in Soviet Ukraine. Now, immigrants from Ukraine to Western Canada since 1991, speaking Ukrainian, find the Canadian Ukrainian dialect old-fashioned and sometimes strange, for modern Ukrainian no longer uses some of the expressions and vocabulary common to the Canadian dialect – or, in the case of the Canadian loan words and adaptations, never did use, because Standard Ukrainian either invented other terms or borrowed and adapted from other languages, such as French, German or Russian.

There are a few Ukrainian Catholic elementary schools in the Greater Toronto Area, including St. Demetrius Catholic Elementary school, St. Josaphat Catholic Elementary school, and Josef Cardinal Slipyj Elementary school, all in Etobicoke; as well as St. Sofia Catholic Elementary school in Mississauga.

=== Religion ===
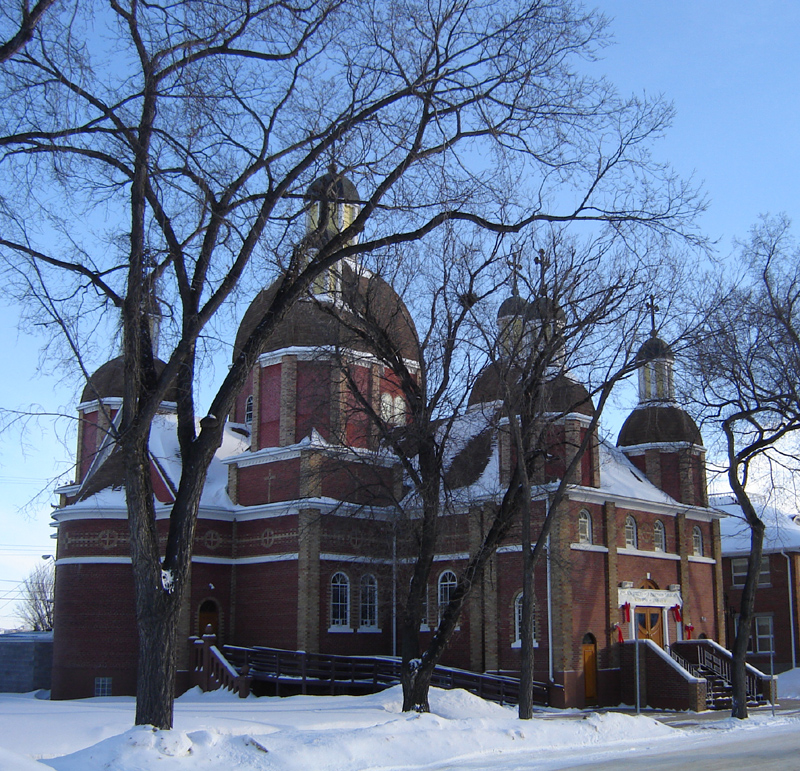
St. George's Ukrainian Catholic Cathedral, Saskatoon.

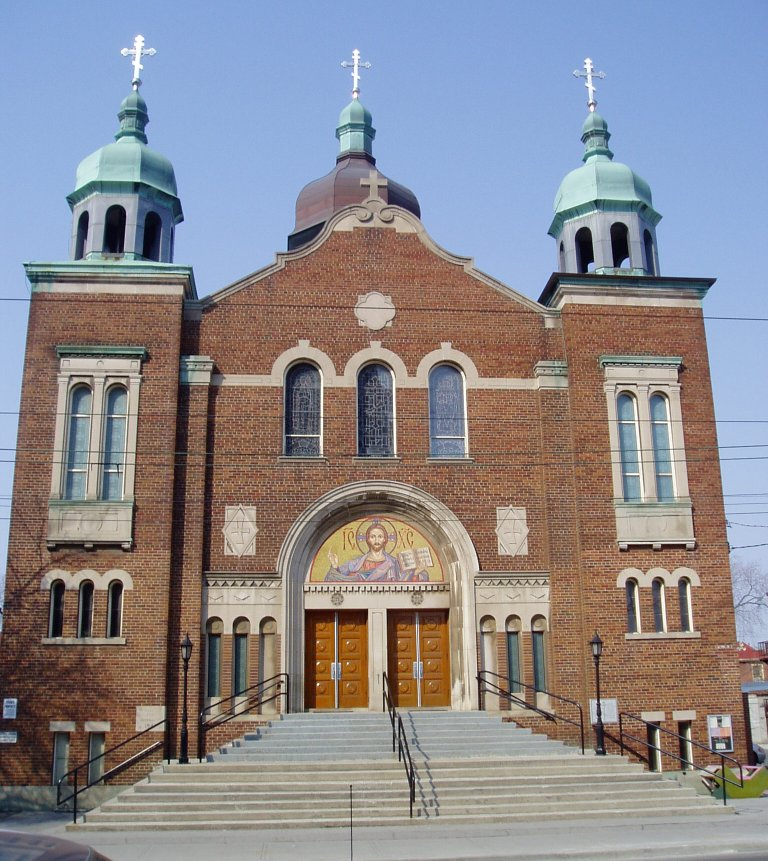
St. Volodymyr's Ukrainian Orthodox Cathedral, Toronto.

Most Ukrainians who came to Canada from Galicia were Ukrainian Catholic and those from Bukovina were Ukrainian Orthodox. However, people of both churches faced a shortage of priests in Canada. The Ukrainian Catholic clergy came into conflict with the Roman Catholic hierarchy because they were not celibate and wanted a separate governing structure. At the time, the Russian Orthodox Church was the only Orthodox Christian church that operated in North America – because they had arrived first via Alaska, and traditionally Orthodox churches are territorially exclusive. However, Ukrainians in Canada were suspicious of being controlled from Russia, first by the Tsarist government and later by the Soviets. Partially in response to this, the Ukrainian Orthodox Church of Canada was created as a wholly Ukrainian Canadian-controlled alternative. As well, the Ukrainian Catholic clergy were eventually given a separate structure from the Roman Church.

Ukrainian Canadian demography by religion
Religious group	2021 (Note: Religious breakdown proportions based on "Ukrainian" ethnic or cultural origin responses on the 2021 census.)		2001 (Note: Religious breakdown proportions based on "Ukrainian" ethnic or cultural origin responses on the 2001 census.)	
Religious group	Pop.	%	Pop.	%
Christianity	661,430	52.55%	827,055	77.22%
Islam	1,515	0.12%	570	0.05%
Judaism	12,340	0.98%	5,155	0.48%
Irreligion	570,730	45.35%	233,310	21.78%
Buddhism	1,850	0.15%	1,270	0.12%
Hinduism	280	0.02%	135	0.01%
Sikhism	210	0.02%	140	0.01%
Indigenous spirituality	775	0.06%	0	0%
Other	9,505	0.76%	2,905	0.27%
Total Ukrainian Canadian population	1,258,635	100%	1,071,055	100%

Ukrainian Canadian demography by Christian sects
Religious group	2021		2001	
Religious group	Pop.	%	Pop.	%
Catholic	305,090	46.13%	397,945	48.09%
Orthodox	81,345	12.3%	78,820	9.53%
Protestant	176,240	26.65%	318,355	38.47%
Other Christian	98,755	14.93%	32,445	3.92%
Total Ukrainian Canadian christian population	661,430	100%	827,505	100%

== Geographical distribution ==
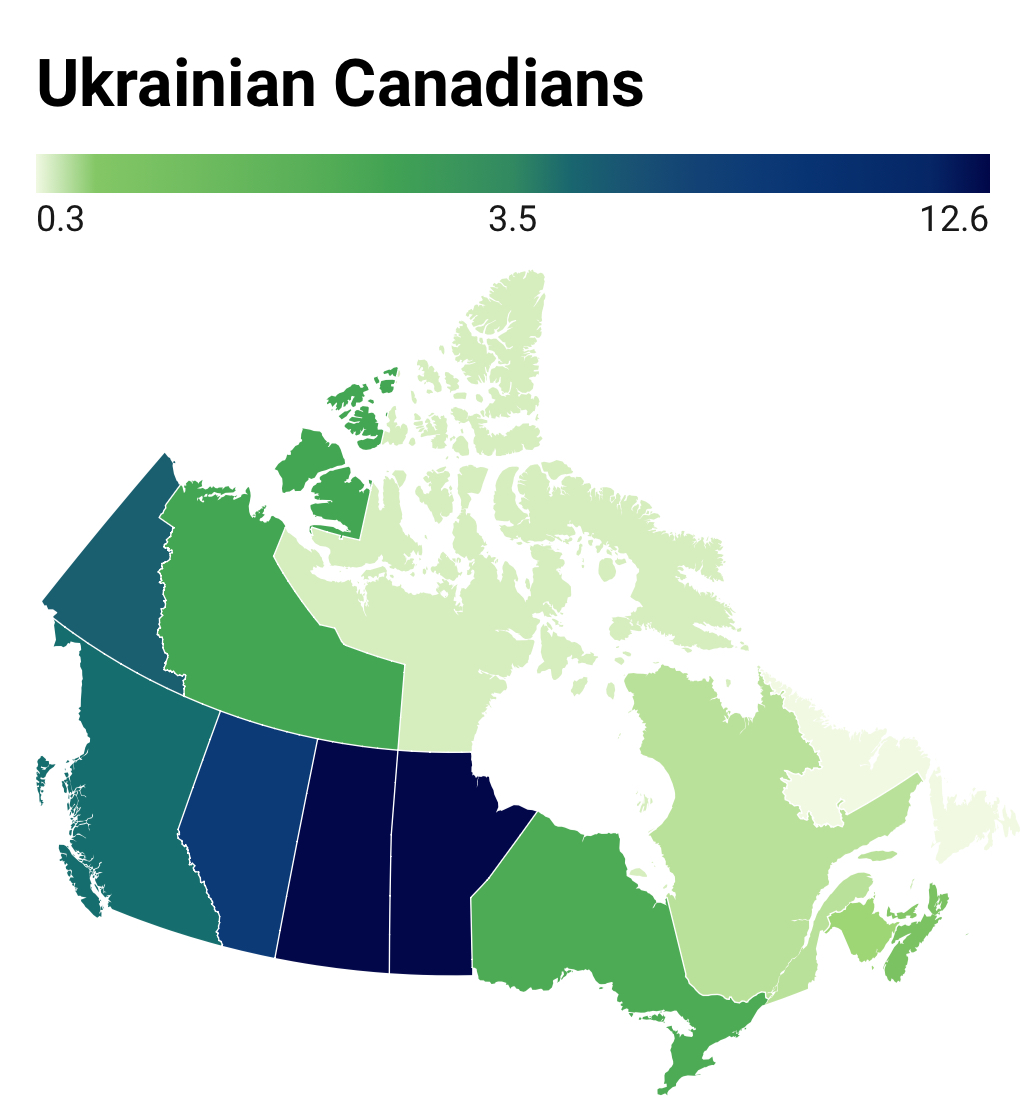
Ukrainian percent in Canadian province/territory, 2021 census

Information in this section taken from Statistics Canada, 2016.

=== Provinces & territories ===
Province / Territory	Percent Ukrainian	Total Ukrainians
Alberta	9.3%	369,090
British Columbia	5.0%	229,205
Manitoba	14.5%	180,055
New Brunswick	0.5%	3,535
Newfoundland and Labrador	0.3%	1,350
Northwest Territories	3.2%	1,290
Nova Scotia	1.0%	9,115
Nunavut	0.5%	190
Ontario	2.8%	376,440
Prince Edward Island	0.7%	930
Quebec	0.5%	42,550
Saskatchewan	13.4%	143,700
Yukon	6.3%	2,205
Total	3.9%	1,359,655

=== Cities ===
City	Population	Ukrainian Population	Percentage of Ukrainians (out of total population)	Percentage of all Canadian Ukrainians
Calgary	1,239,220	77,670	6.4%	5.7%
Edmonton	932,546	98,820	10.8%	7.3%
Hamilton	536,917	18,990	3.6%	1.4%
Montreal	1,704,694	18,010	1.1%	1.3%
Ottawa	923,243	24,965	2.7%	1.8%
Regina	215,106	26,590	12.6%	2.0%
Saskatoon	246,376	38,600	16.0%	2.8%
Toronto	2,721,571	72,345	2.7%	5.3%
Vancouver (Metro Vancouver)	2,463,431	94,400	3.9%	6.9%
Victoria	85,792	5,015	6.1%	0.4%
Windsor	217,188	6,165	2.9%	0.5%
Winnipeg	705,244	99,365	14.4%	7.3%

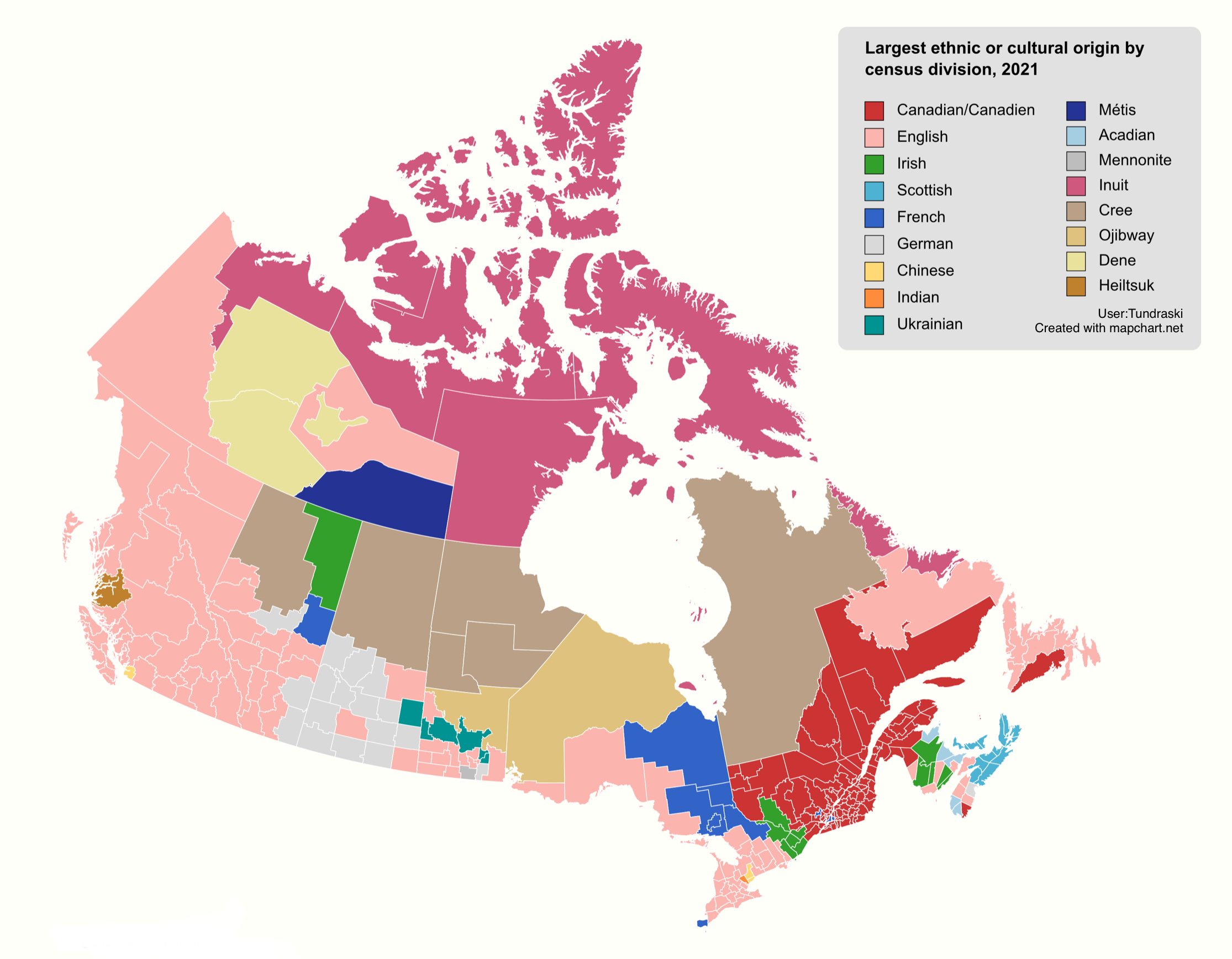
Map of the dominant self-identified ethnic origins of ancestors per census division. Actual physical origins of ancestors may be different. Ukrainian-plurality areas are highlighted in teal. Note that Ukrainians are a significant minority elsewhere, and that, numerically, most Ukrainian Canadians live in cities.

Information in this section taken from both 2006 Census Community Profiles, and Statistics Canada, 2016.

The provinces with the largest Ukrainian populations (single and multiple origins, 2006) are Ontario, 336,355; Alberta, 332,180; British Columbia, 197,265; Manitoba, 167,175; Saskatchewan 129,265; and Quebec, 31,955. In terms of proportion of the total population, the most Ukrainian provinces and territories are Manitoba (15%), Saskatchewan (13%), Alberta (10%), Yukon (5%), British Columbia (5%), and Ontario (3%).

The metropolitan regions with the largest Ukrainian populations (single and multiple origins, 2006) are: Edmonton, 144,620; Toronto, 122,510; Winnipeg, 110,335; Vancouver, 81,725; Calgary, 76,240; Saskatoon, 38,825; Hamilton, 27,080; Montreal, 26,150; Regina, 25,725; Ottawa-Gatineau, 21,520; St. Catharines–Niagara, 20,990; Thunder Bay, 17,620; Victoria, 15,020; Kelowna, 13,425; Oshawa, 12,555; London, 10,765; and Kitchener, 10,425.

The Census Divisions with the largest percentage of Ukrainians (single and multiple origins, 2006) are Manitoba #12 (25%), Alberta #10 (20%), Alberta #12 (19%), Manitoba #11 (15%), Manitoba #7 (13%), Manitoba #10 (12%), Manitoba #9 (12%), Manitoba #2 (10%).

There are a number of smaller rural communities in Western Canada with significant proportions of Ukrainians (single and multiple origins, 2016), including: Canora, Saskatchewan (52.6%), Speers, Saskatchewan (50%), Andrew, Alberta (48%), Mundare, Alberta (46%), Bradwell, Saskatchewan (41%), Vilna, Alberta (40%), Smoky Lake, Alberta (39%), Hafford, Saskatchewan (39%).

== Culture ==
Having been separated from Ukraine, Ukrainian Canadians have developed their own distinctive Ukrainian culture in Canada. To showcase their unique hybrid culture, Ukrainian Canadians have created institutions that showcase Ukrainian Canadian culture such as Edmonton's Cheremosh and Shumka troupes – among the world's elite Ukrainian dancers; or the Ukrainian Cultural Heritage Village – a living-history museum approximately 39 kilometres east of Edmonton where Ukrainian pioneer buildings are displayed along with extensive cultural exhibits.

Ukrainian Canadians have also contributed to Canadian culture as a whole. Actress and comedian Luba Goy, singer Gloria Kaye, Jeopardy! host Alex Trebek, hockey player Wayne Gretzky, hockey executive Kyle Dubas, and painter William Kurelek, for example, are well known outside the Ukrainian community.

Perhaps one of the most lasting contributions Ukrainian Canadians have made to the wider culture of Canada is the concept of multiculturalism, which was promoted as early as 1963 by Senator Paul Yuzyk. During and after the debates surrounding the Royal Commission on Bilingualism and Biculturalism, Ukrainian leaders, such as linguist Jaroslav Rudnyckyj, came out in force against the idea of English – French biculturalism, which they believed denied the contributions other peoples had made to Canada. Partly in response to this, Prime Minister Pierre Trudeau shifted Canada to a policy of official multiculturalism; notably, the day after the Canadian Multiculturalism Policy of 1971 was officially announced, Trudeau gave a forceful speech in support of the policy at a national assembly of the Ukrainian Canadian Congress in Winnipeg.

=== Architecture ===
The Western Ukrainian agricultural settlers brought with them a style of folk architecture dominated by buildings made of unprocessed logs, which were much better suited to the wooded parkland belt rather than the "bald prairie". The first house built – usually a burdei – used some sod; but was not exactly a sod hut, more like a dugout. The second house was often a white-washed and plastered log cabin usually with thatched roof, very similar to those seen in Ukraine. Barns, chicken coops, granaries, and so on were all built using the same techniques as the houses. By the 1930s most Ukrainian Canadians adopted the building styles of the North American mainstream including framed homes and barns built from commercial plans and using milled lumber.

Early churches, built by pioneer farmers rather than trained builders, were basically log cabins with a few added decorations. They aspired to the designs of Ukraine's wooden churches, but were much more humble. Latter churches – such as the "prairie cathedral" style of Father Philip Ruh, using a mixture of Byzantine and Western influences – were much more decorative.

=== Politics ===
Many Ukrainians fled Russia, Poland, and later, the Soviet Union, to find freedom and a better life in Canada. For them Canada became "an anti-Russia", where they could realize their political and economic ideas. Most Ukrainian Canadians were anti-Soviet, yet a minor group of Ukrainians has since 1910 supported Canadian socialism and contributed to the formation of the Communist Party of Canada, and formed a significant bloc within that group. They were also active in other Marxist organizations like the Ukrainian Labour Farmer Temple Association (ULFTA). Ukrainians also played a central role in the 1930s formation of the Co-operative Commonwealth Federation (CCF) and the 1960s formation of the New Democratic Party. Ukrainians were a notable portion of the Mackenzie–Papineau Battalion of Canadians who volunteered and fought in the Spanish Civil War on the side of the leftist republican government against the nationalist troops of Generalísimo Francisco Franco.

Ukrainians in Canada at first supported the Liberal Party federally and provincially, a minority moved towards the 1930s protest parties of Social Credit and the CCF federally and provincially. The vocal anti-communism of John Diefenbaker in the 1950s led the more nationalist-minded to support the federal Progressive Conservatives. Today's Ukrainian community tends to vote based on economic class interests and regional preferences.

The nationalist movement, through the Ukrainian National Federation and the Canadian League for the Liberation of Ukraine, was also an important part of the community. After Ukraine became independent Canada was one of the first nations to recognize Ukraine. From 1992 to 1994, Ukrainian Canadians were vital in fundraising to purchase a building in Ottawa to house the Embassy of Ukraine. As well, Canada has recognized the Holodomor (Ukrainian Famine) as an act of genocide. Canada also sent many observers to Ukraine during the disputed 2004 presidential election (see: Orange Revolution). The Government of Canada as well as its provincial governments – especially the Ukrainian strongholds in Alberta, Manitoba and Saskatchewan – do much to support Ukraine's economic and political development.

The Ukrainian Canadians had and have much more influence in Canadian society and policy than any other East European group; therefore they have had several prominent figures in top positions. Ray Hnatyshyn was the 24th Governor General of Canada (1990–1995) and the first Governor General of Ukrainian descent. Ukrainians were also elected leaders of Canada's prairie provinces: Gary Filmon was Premier of Manitoba (1988–1999), and Roy Romanow was Premier of Saskatchewan (1991–2001).

Ed Stelmach became Premier of Alberta in 2006 as the third provincial premier of Ukrainian descent. He succeeded Ralph Klein (1992–2006), who had cabinets with many Ukrainian ministers. Stelmach himself is the grandson of Ukrainian immigrants and speaks fluent Ukrainian. He left office in October 2011.

Chrystia Freeland, who was Deputy Prime Minister of Canada from 2019 to 2024, is of Ukrainian descent and speaks Ukrainian. Rona Ambrose (née Chapchuk), who was Leader of the Opposition and interim Conservative party leader from 2015 to 2017, is of Ukrainian descent.

=== Arts ===
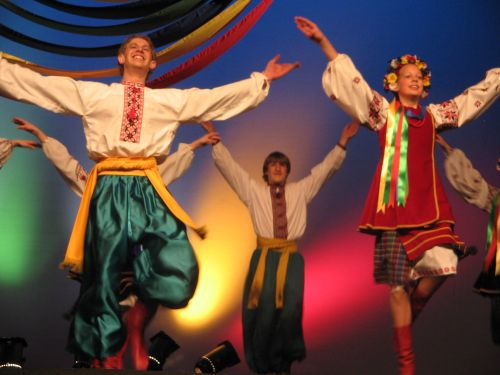
A Ukrainian dance troupe at the BC Ukrainian Cultural Festival

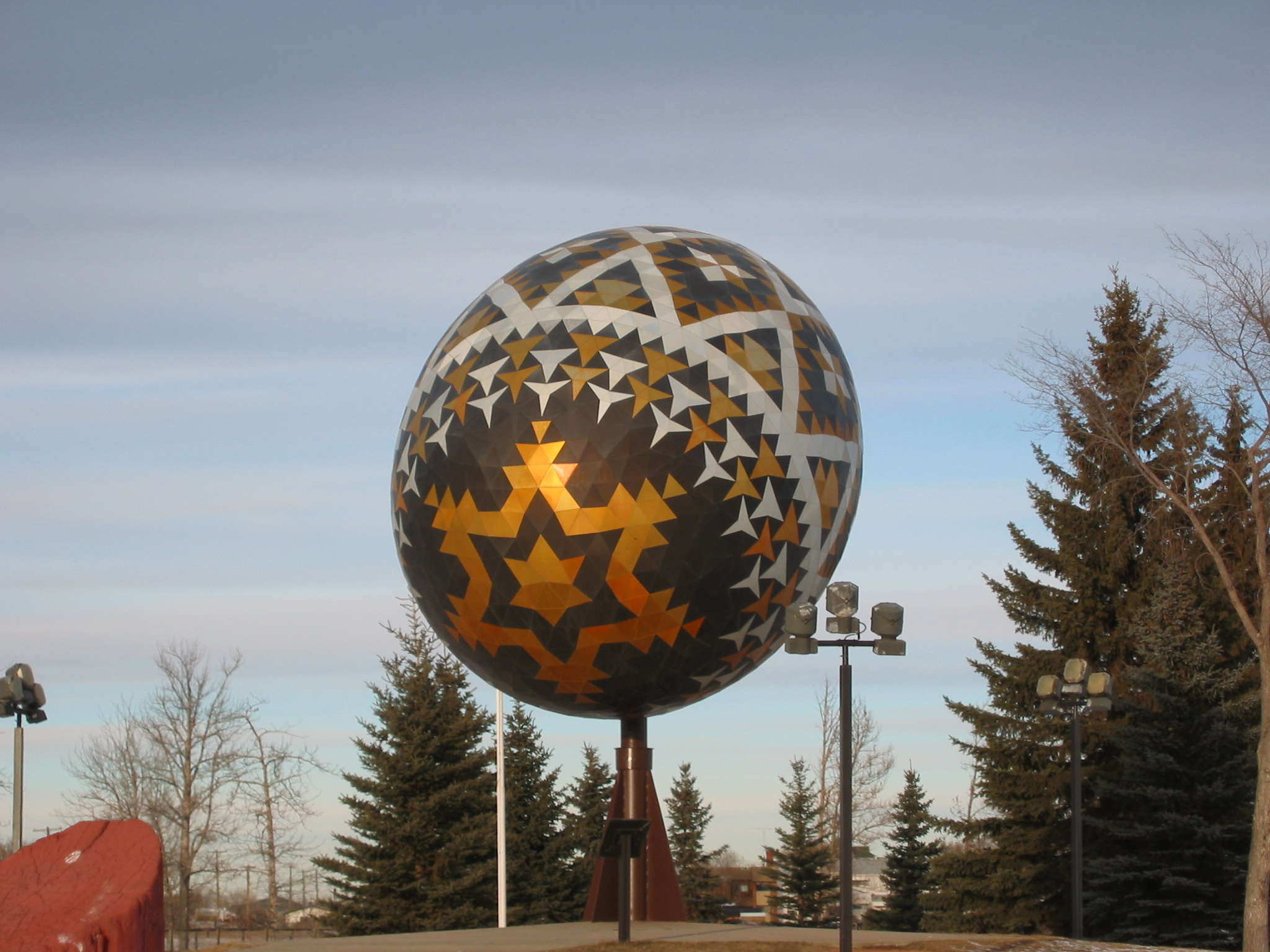
In 1974, what was then the world's largest pysanka was erected in Vegreville, Alberta, commemorating the 100th anniversary of the Royal Canadian Mounted Police. It has since been exceeded by a pysanka built in Ukraine.

Canada is home to some Ukrainian dance groups. Some examples of Ukrainian dance ensembles in Canada are the Ukrainian Shumka Dancers and the Cheremosh Ukrainian Dance Company in Edmonton, the Rusalka Ukrainian Dance Ensemble and Rozmai Ukrainian Dance Company in Winnipeg, the Svitanok Ukrainian Dance Ensemble in Ottawa, Saskatoon's Rushnychok Ukrainian Folk Dance Association, and hundreds of other groups.

The Ukrainian Canadian Foundation of Taras Shevchenko provides some financial support for Ukrainian Canadian performing, literary and visual arts.

Ukrainians in general are noted for their elaborately decorated Easter Eggs or pysanky, and that is also true in Canada. The world's second largest pysanka is in Vegreville, Alberta.

Ukrainian Canadian churches are also famous for their onion domes, which have elaborately painted murals on their interior, and for their iconostasis, or icon walls.

=== Literature and academia ===
Ukrainian Canadians have contributed to the literature of Canada and to the field of folklore.

Professor of folklore and Kule Chair Emerita at the University of Alberta, Natalie Kononenko, is well respected, and has made numerous contributions to her field. In 2023, Kononenko published a book entitled, "Ukrainian Ritual on the Prairies: Growing a Ukrainian Canadian Identity.".

From British Columbia, Ukrainian Canadian author Danny Evanishen wrote and published more than eleven books retelling Ukrainian folk tales in English and sharing stories from his childhood and travel.

=== Music ===
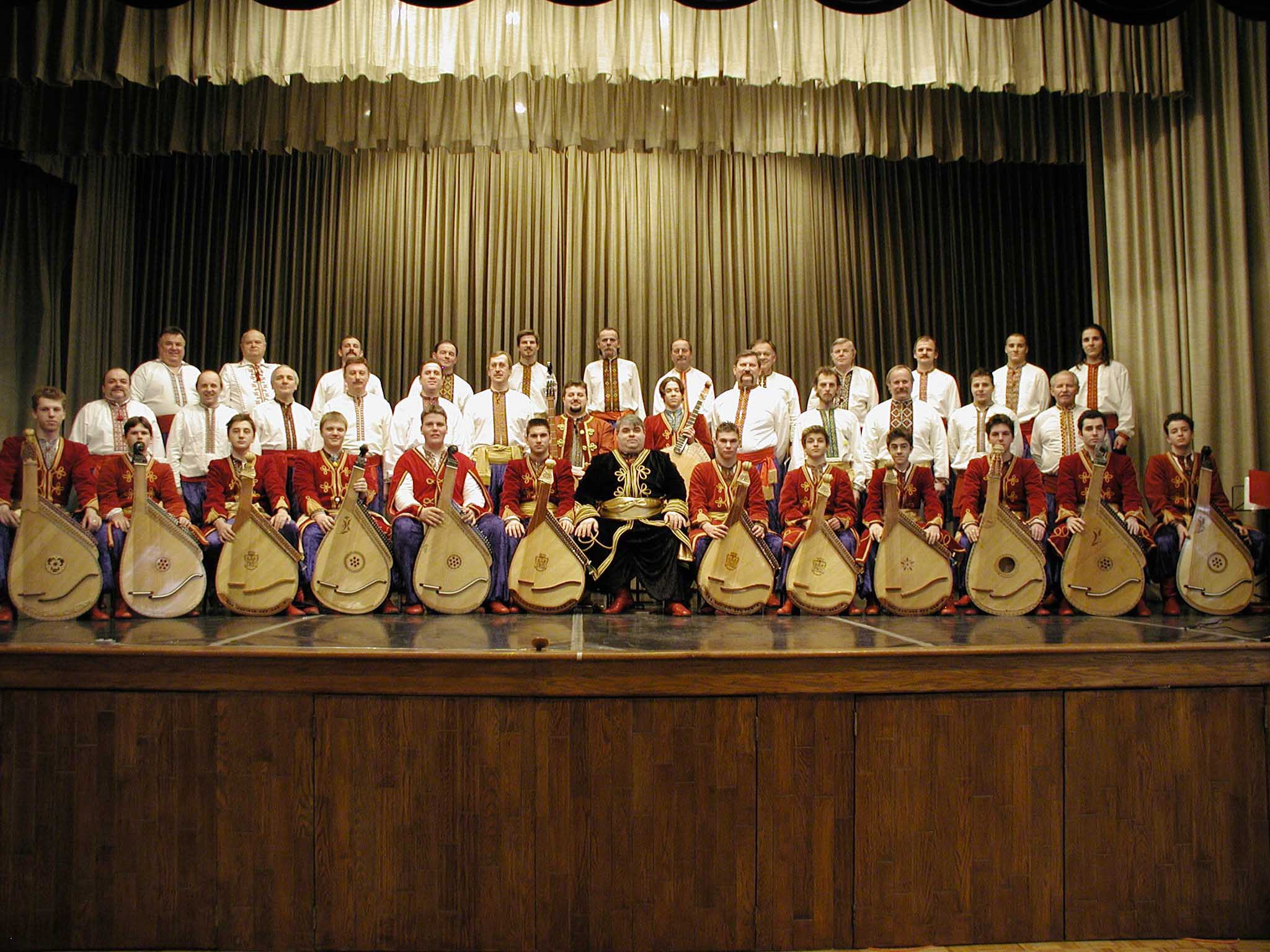
The Canadian Bandurist Capella in 2003

Ukrainian Canadian musicians and groups include Randy Bachman, Luba, the Canadian Bandurist Capella, Ron Cahute, Rick Danko, Victor Mishalow, Chantal Kreviazuk, Gordie Johnson, Canadian Idol season 2 runner-up Theresa Sokyrka, Zirka from Toronto, D-Drifters from Winnipeg, Cheremshyna (ensemble) from Montreal, Sons of the Steppes (known as Сини степів or Syny Stepiv) from Montreal, Wasyl Kohut of the progressive rock band CANO, and Rushnychok from Montreal. The Edmonton-based group the Kubasonics focuses on a folk fusion of traditional Ukrainian music with modern touches.

=== Food ===
Cultural food is an important part of Ukrainian culture. Special foods used at Easter as well as Christmas are not made at any other time of the year. In fact on Christmas Eve (January 6 (Note: Because Ukrainian Canadians are the largest Eastern Christian group in Canada, January 6–7 is commonly referred by Canadians of all origins as "Ukrainian Christmas".) in the Gregorian calendar), a special twelve-dish meatless meal is served. The best-known foods are borshch (a vegetable soup, usually with beets), holobtsi (cabbage rolls), pyrohy or varenyky (dumplings often called "perogies"), and kovbasa (sausage).

Several items of Ukrainian food and culture have been enshrined with roadside attractions throughout the Prairie provinces. These are celebrated in the polka Giants of the Prairies by the Kubasonics. For example, the world's largest perogy is in Glendon, Alberta, and the world's biggest kovbasa is in Mundare, Alberta.

=== Institutions ===
There are a number of Ukrainian Canadian institutions, mostly affiliated with an umbrella organization or with a university, such as:

- Association of United Ukrainian Canadians – established in 1918; historically, the other largest Ukrainian Canadian institution, previously called the Ukrainian Labour Farmer Temple Association and connected with socialism in Canada and the labour movement, including:
  - Ivan Franko Museum in Winnipeg
  - Taras Shevchenko Museum in Toronto
  - Ukrainian Labour Temple in Winnipeg
- Ukrainian Canadian Civil Liberties Association, an independent group dedicated to the articulation and defence of the Ukrainian Canadian community's interests
- Ukrainian Canadian Congress – established in 1940; the largest of any Ukrainian Canadian institutions, an umbrella organization of nationalist and historically anti-Soviet organizations; including provincial councils, local branches, and member organizations such as:
  - Plast Ukrainian Youth Association in Canada
  - Ukrainian Canadian Research and Documentation Centre
  - Ukrainian Canadian Students’ Union
  - Ukrainian Museum of Canada, based in Saskatoon with branches in the other major cities
  - Ukrainian National Federation of Canada, and its Ukrainian Cultural and Educational Centre in Winnipeg
- Various institutions at Canadian universities, including:
  - Canadian Institute of Ukrainian Studies (University of Alberta and University of Toronto)
  - Centre for Ukrainian Canadian Studies (University of Manitoba)
  - Kule Folklore Centre (University of Alberta)
  - Prairie Centre for the Study of Ukrainian Heritage (University of Saskatchewan)
  - St. Andrew's College (University of Manitoba), seminary of the Ukrainian Orthodox Church of Canada
  - St. Petro Mohyla Institute, student residence in Saskatoon
  - St. Volodymyr Institute, cultural hub with a theatre, a library and a student residence in Toronto

== Gallery ==
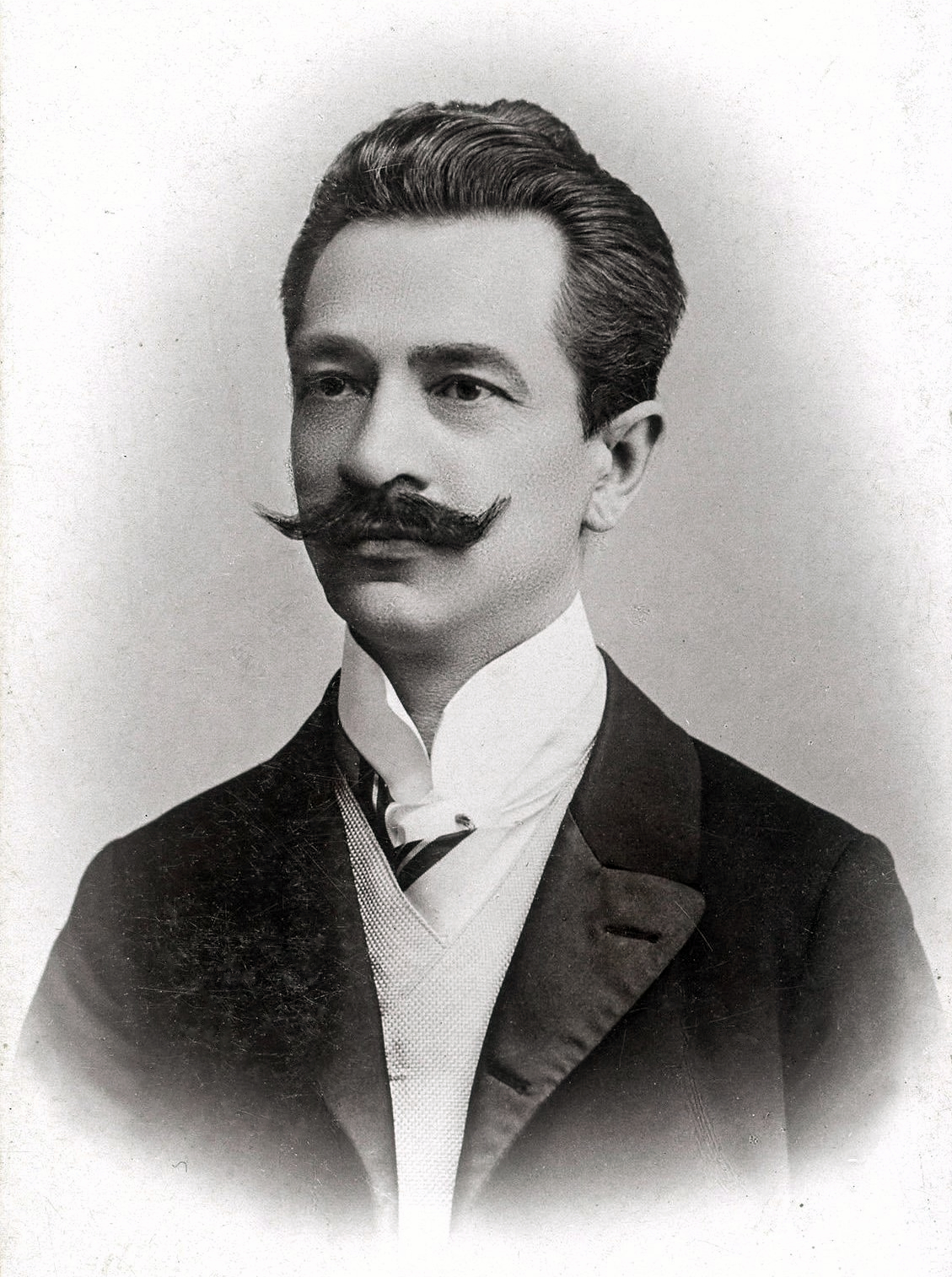
Dr. Joseph Oleskow in 1896, before his second voyage to Canada

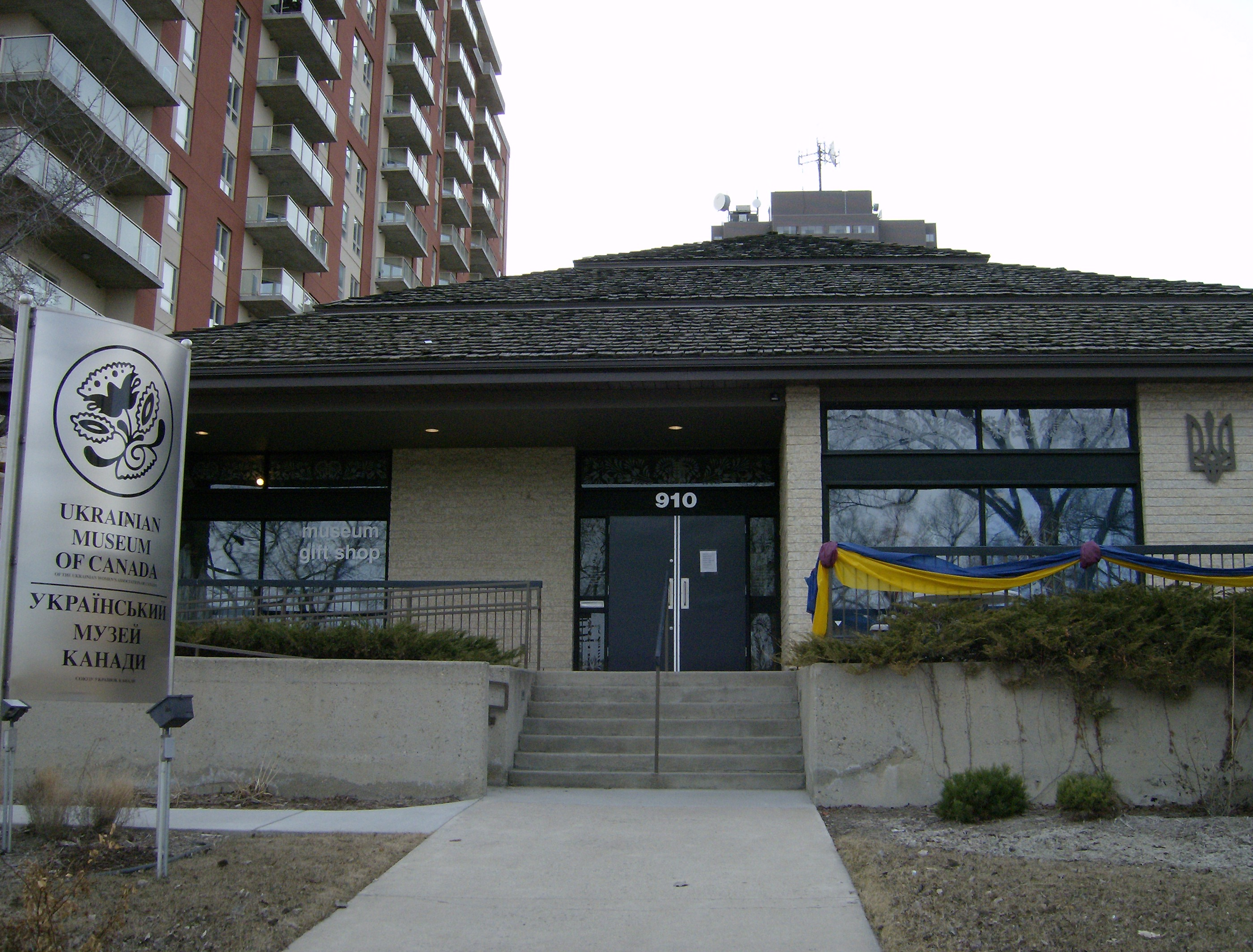
Ukrainian Museum of Canada, Saskatoon

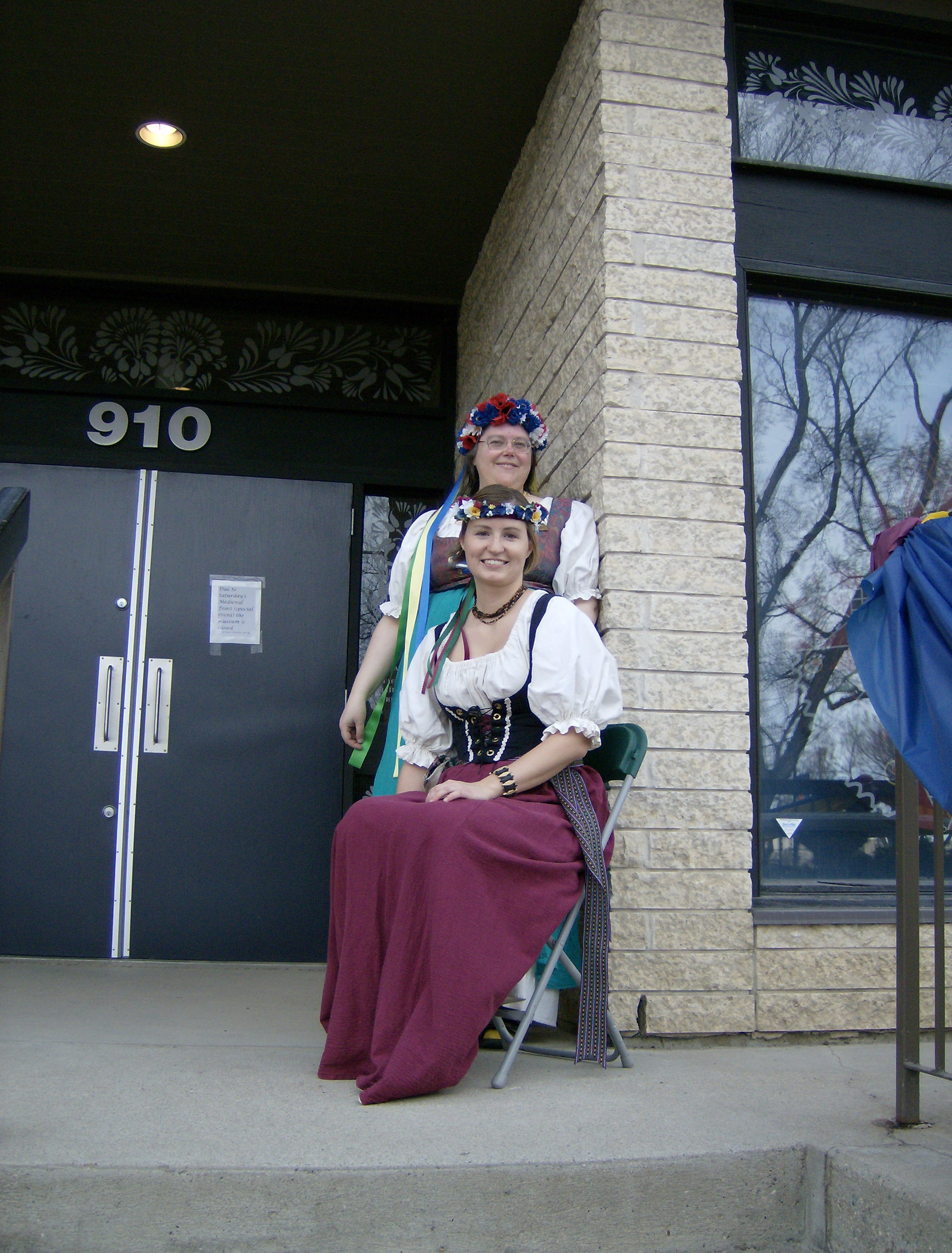
Ukrainian Museum of Canada workers in traditional dress outside the Saskatoon museum

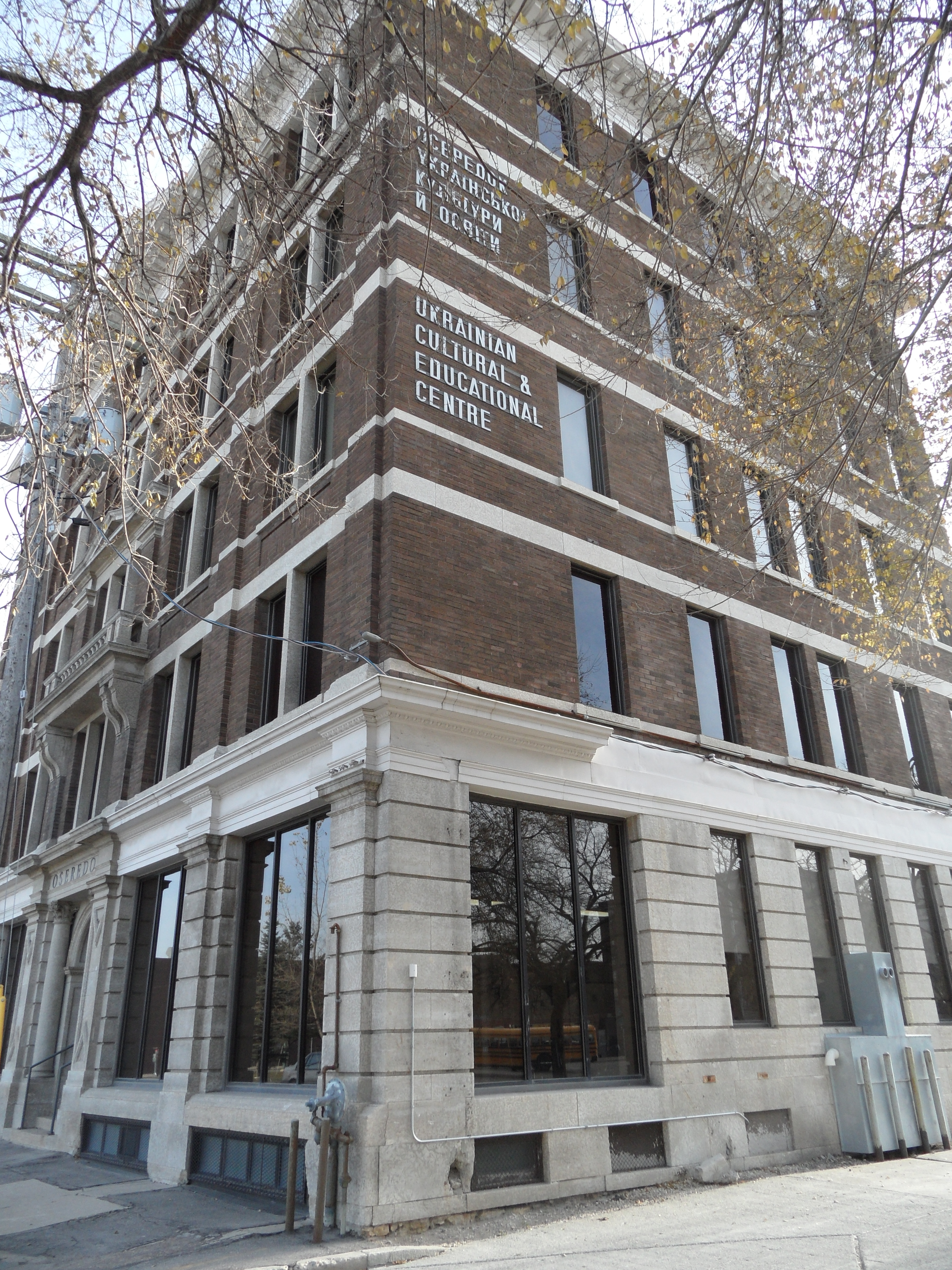
Ukrainian Cultural and Educational Centre "Oseredok", Winnipeg

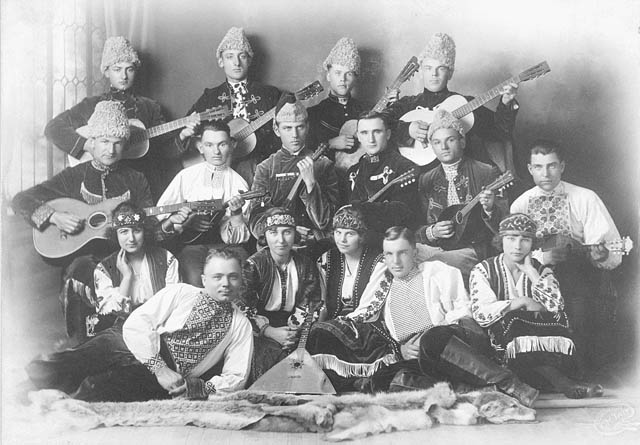
A Ukrainian folk music "orchestra" associated with the then Mykhailo Hrushevsky Institute of Edmonton, now known as St John's Institute

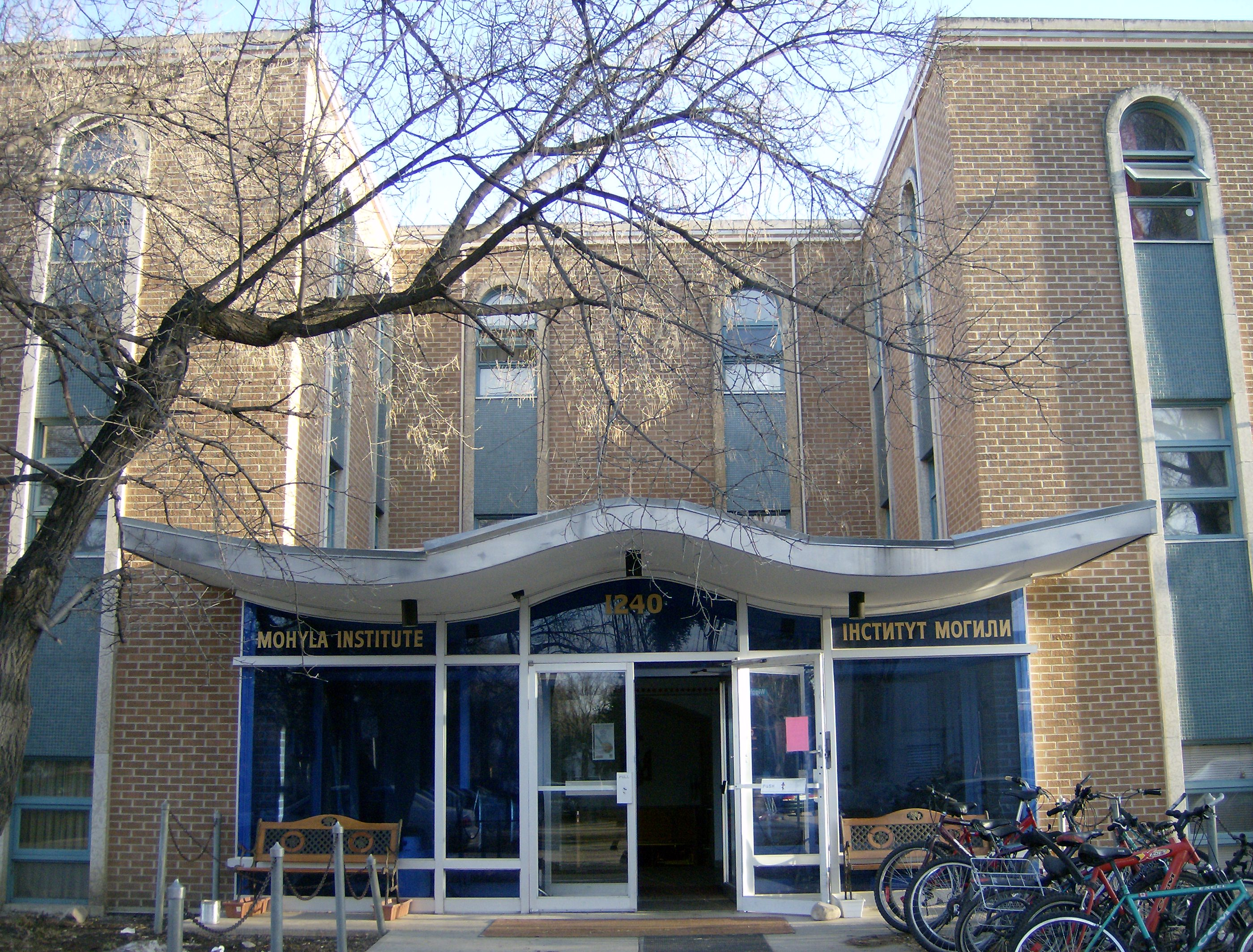
St. Petro Mohyla Institute, Saskatoon

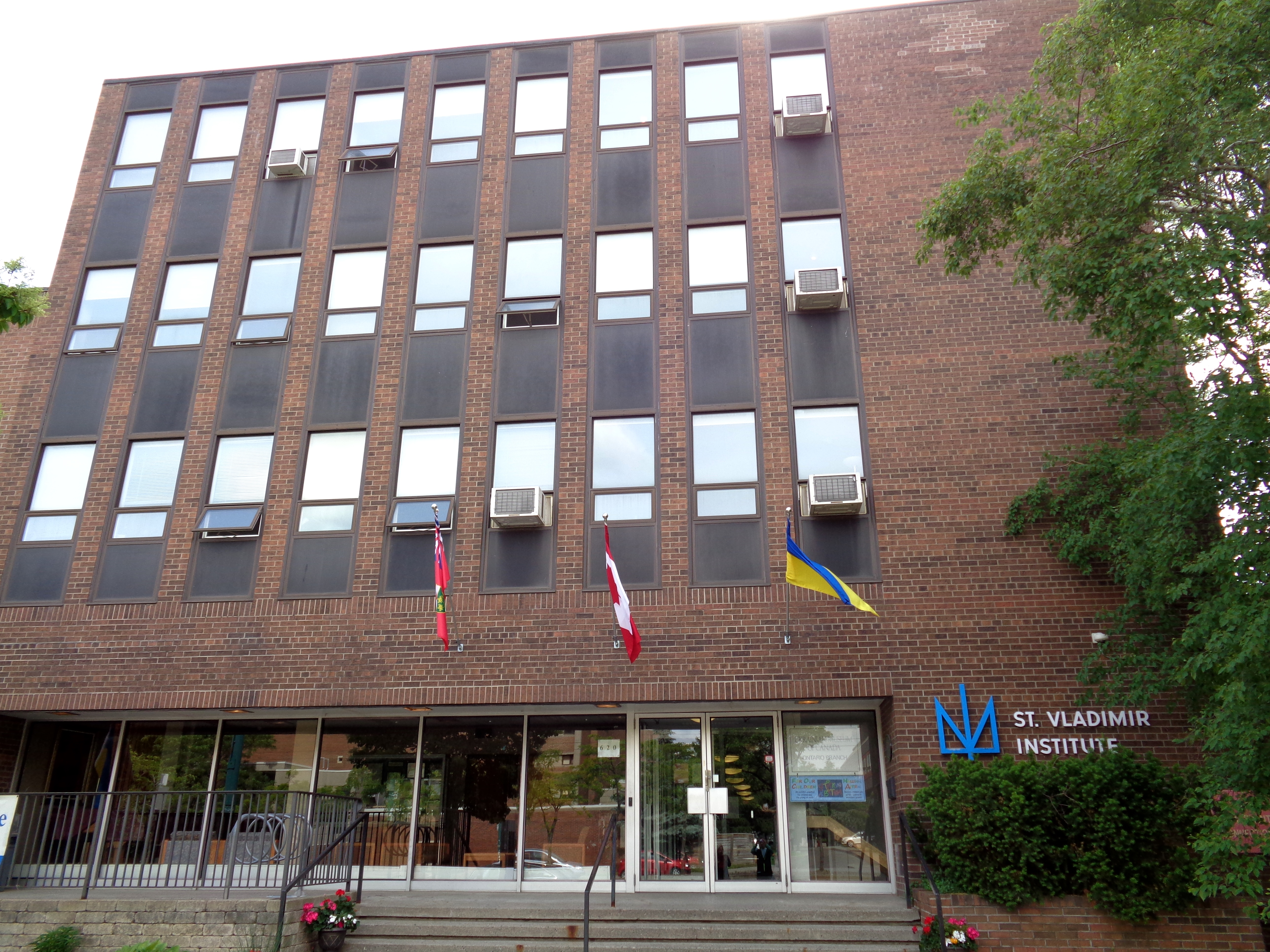
St. Volodymyr Institute, Toronto

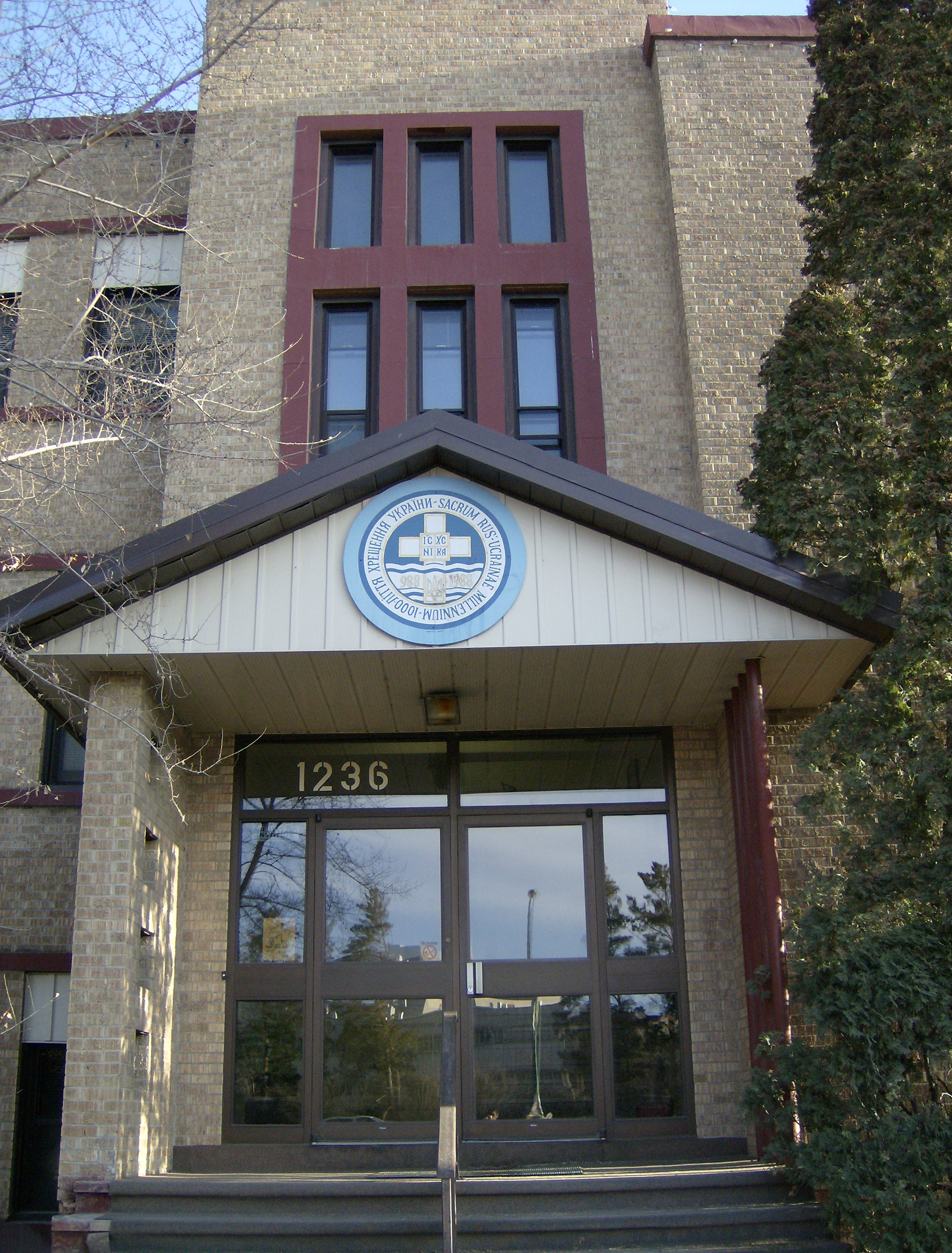
Former Sheptytsky Institute building at the University of Saskatchewan in Saskatoon

== See also ==
- List of Ukrainian Canadians
- List of Canadian place names of Ukrainian origin
- Canada–Ukraine relations
- European Canadians
- Ukrainian Americans
