= Association of United Ukrainian Canadians =

Canadian non-profit organization

- Товариство об'єднаних українських канадців
- Abbreviation: AUUC
- Formation: 1918; 108 years ago
- Headquarters: Winnipeg, Manitoba
- President: Glenn Michalchuk
- Main organ: Board of Directors
- Website: auuc.ca
- Formerly called: Ukrainian Labour Farmer Temple Association

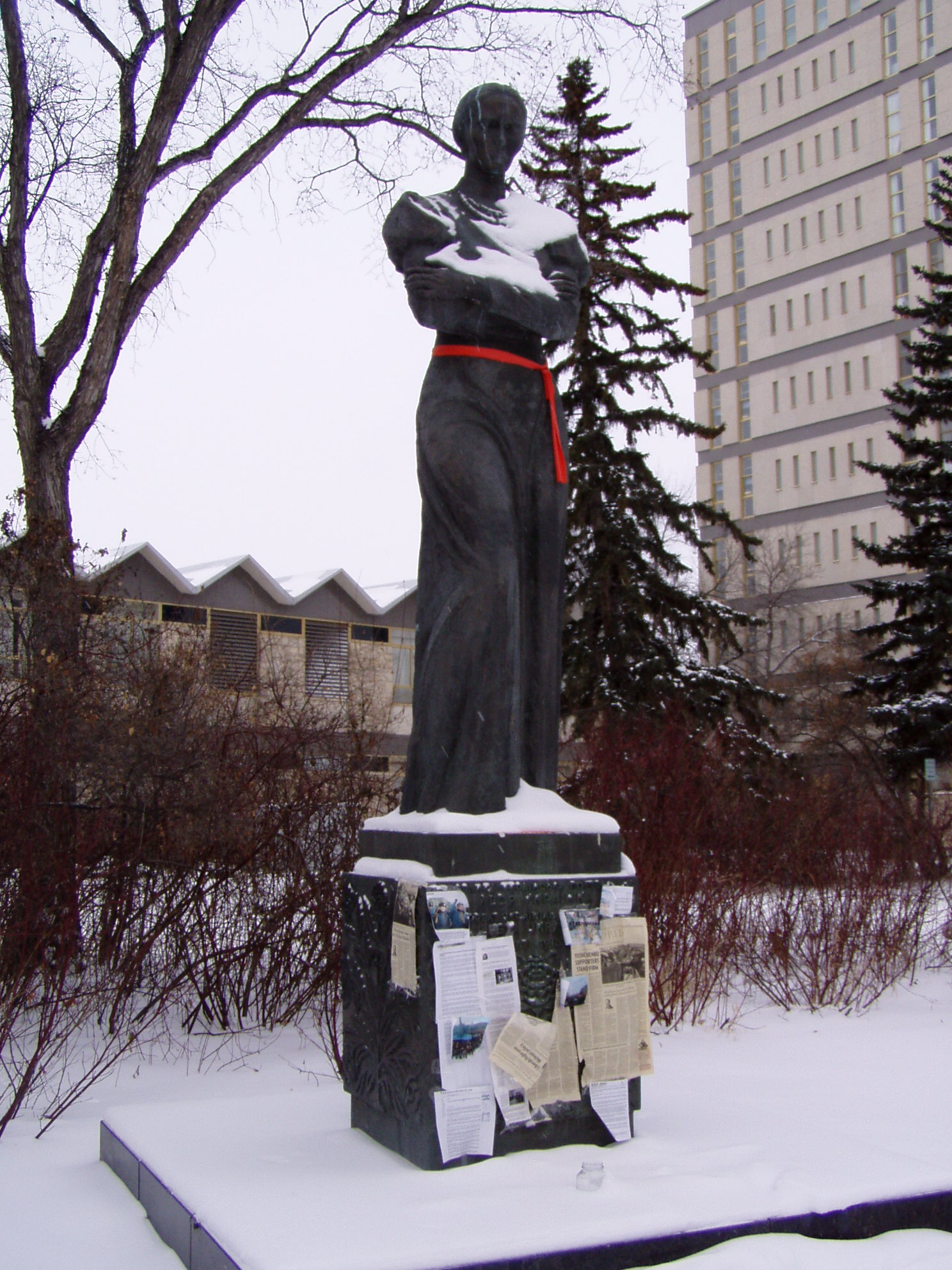
Statue of Ukrainian poet Lesya Ukrainka donated to the AUUC by the Soviet authorities in Ukraine in 1976 and residing at the University of Saskatchewan.

The Association of United Ukrainian Canadians (AUUC; Ukrainian: Товариство об'єднаних українських канадців) is a national cultural-educational non-profit organization established for Ukrainians in Canada. With branches throughout Canada it sponsors such cultural activities as dance groups, orchestras, choirs and children's activities, and is involved in social justice and solidarity activities in partnership with other ethnocultural organizations, peace groups, and community organizations. The association traditionally supports leftist politics.

== History ==
=== Establishment ===
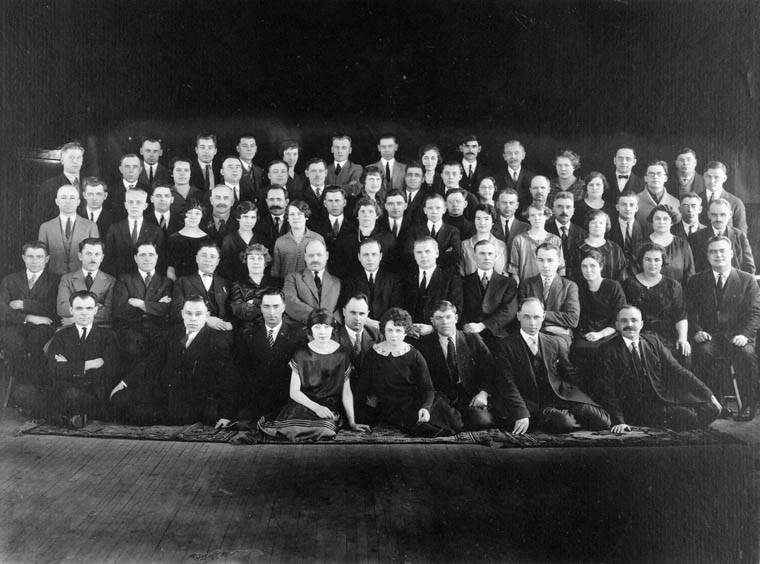
Seventh convention of the Ukrainian Labour Farmer Temple Association

The Ukrainian Labour Farmer Temple Association (ULFTA) was established in Winnipeg in 1918 as an association of cultural societies and community halls and the Ukrainian Social Democratic Party of Canada (USDPC). By 1928 it had 167 branches across Canada. Labour Temples and other associated halls existed in cities like Winnipeg, Edmonton, and Toronto (1921), as well as in rural communities in the Ukrainian Block Settlements.

As no form of public medicare was available at the time, ULFTA founded the Workers Benevolent Association (WBA) in Winnipeg in 1922, with branches and membership rapidly spreading throughout Canada; it even extended its membership to all workers, irrespective of ethnic origin.

Labour Temples were involved in organizing actions such as the Winnipeg General Strike, support for the 1931 Bienfait miners’ strike and the On-to-Ottawa Trek in 1935.

In 1940, the ULFTA was banned under the wartime Defence of Canada Regulations, along with the Communist Party of Canada and affiliate organizations, due to its support for the Soviet Union. A few of its leaders and journalists were interned. Labour Temples were confiscated by the federal government as "enemy property" with several being sold off.

=== War and post-war ===
After the June 1941 invasion of the Soviet Union, former members of the ULFTA formed the Ukrainian Society for Aid to the Motherland (USAM) and the Association of Canadian Ukrainians (ACU). In 1943, the federal government lifted its ban on the ULFTA and its remaining properties were returned.

In 1946, the ULFTA, ACU, and USAM and other activists merged to form the Association of United Ukrainian Canadians (AUUC) as the continuation of the ULFTA.

On the evening of October 8, 1950, a homemade bomb exploded in the Ukrainian Labour Temple building at 400 Bathurst Street in Toronto while it was full with 1,000 people attending various events. Ten to twelve people were injured. The Association of United Ukrainian Canadians accused former members of the Ukrainian Schutzstaffel (SS (Nazi)) who had emigrated to Canada after the war of being behind the bombing.

The AUUC has a legacy of senior's homes, children's camps, monuments and museums to Ukrainian literary giants, most notably the monument to the Ukrainian poet Lesya Ukrainka, a gift from Soviet Ukraine, on the grounds of the University of Saskatchewan in 1976. In addition, the AUUC still runs programs such as Edmonton's Trembita dance ensemble.

== See also ==
- Ukrainian Labour Temple, Winnipeg
- United Jewish Peoples' Order

=== Archives ===
There is an Association of United Ukrainian Canadians fond at Library and Archives Canada. The archival reference number is R3120, former archival reference number is MG28-V154. The fond covers the date ranges 1929 to 1996. It includes 8 meters of textual records; 7 photographs; 3 film reels.
