= Communist Party of Canada (Marxist–Leninist) candidates in the 1997 Canadian federal election =

The Communist Party of Canada (Marxist-Leninist) ran 65 candidates in the 1997 federal election, none of whom were elected. Information about these candidates may be found on this page.

== Manitoba ==
=== Rubin Kantorovich (St. Boniface) ===
Kantorovich is an electronics technician and a musician , and has campaigned for the Canadian House of Commons in the elections of 1988, 1993 and 1997. His was listed as a non-affiliated candidate in 1988, as the Marxist-Leninist Party was not registered with Elections Canada.

Electoral record
| Election | District | Party | Votes | % | Place | Winner |
|---|---|---|---|---|---|---|
| 1988 federal | St. Boniface | N/A (M-L) | 43 | 0.09 | 7/7 | Ron Duhamel, Liberal |
| 1993 federal | Winnipeg South | M-L | 68 | 0.13 | 8/9 | Reg Alcock, Liberal |
| 1997 federal | St. Boniface | M-L | 171 | 0.46 | 5/5 | Ron Duhamel, Liberal |

=== Glenn Michalchuk (Winnipeg Centre) ===
Michalchuk is an industrial worker. He was listed as Prairie regional vice-president of the Canadian Auto Workers in 1995 (Winnipeg Free Press, 21–22 March 1995), and as vice-president of CAW Local 101 in 2000 (WFP, 18 November 2000). He is currently the first vice-president of the Winnipeg Labour Council. Michalchuk criticized the Brotherhood of Maintenance of Way Employees for conducting a strike in March 1995, accusing them of promoting labour disunity during a period of negotiations on the future of the rail industry.

He was a prominent member of Peace Alliance Winnipeg in 1999, and protested against the bombing of Kosovo by North Atlantic Treaty Organization forced (WFP, 17 June 1999). As of 2006, he is listed as a member of the No War Coalition of Manitoba (WFP, 19 March 2006), and has called for the immediate withdrawal of Canadian troops from Afghanistan ("Protesters for Peace", Winnipeg Sun, 19 March 2006).

Michalchuk has campaigned in three elections for the CPC-ML. He is likely related to Douglas Michalchuk, an industrial worker who campaigned for the CPC-ML in Winnipeg in 1979 and 1980. In fact, it is possible that they are the same person.

Electoral record
| Election | Division | Party | Votes | % | Place | Winner |
|---|---|---|---|---|---|---|
| 1988 federal | Winnipeg North Centre | N/A (M-L) | 97 | | 8/8 | David Walker, Liberal |
| 1993 federal | Winnipeg—St. James | M-L | 45 | | 8/9 | John Harvard, Liberal |
| 1997 federal | Winnipeg Centre | M-L | 136 | 0.51 | 6/8 | Pat Martin, New Democratic Party |

=== Diane Zack (Winnipeg South) ===
Zack was a teacher in Winnipeg at the time of the election. She worked at Greenway School, and in 1996 led a delegation of twenty-six students to watch the proceedings of the Legislative Assembly of Manitoba. She received 94 votes (0.25%), finishing seventh against Liberal incumbent Reg Alcock.

Zack later served as president of the Manitoba-Cuba Solidarity Committee, and spoke in defense of a Canadian businessman who was convicted of a criminal offense in the United States for trading with Cuba (Winnipeg Free Press, 20 June 2002). In 2003, she led a celebration of the anniversary of the Cuban Revolution at the Ukrainian Labour Temple in Winnipeg (Winnipeg Free Press, 23 July 2003). She helped to organize a meeting of Cuban and Canadian organic farmers in 2004 (Winnipeg Free Press, 30 June 2004), and organized a Cuban Film Festival in Winnipeg in 2005 (Winnipeg Free Press, 20 April 2005). She was 55 years old in 2004.

=== Karen Naylor (Winnipeg South Centre) ===
Naylor is a fifth-generation railway worker, and a prominent figure in the Winnipeg labour movement. She has been a union representative in the Canadian Brotherhood of Railway, Transport and General Workers, and has subsequently been active with the Canadian Auto Workers. Naylor was appointed to Manitoba's Workers Compensation Board in 1996, but resigned in April 2005 to protest what she described as the inappropriate treatment of former chair Wally Fox-Decent by the provincial government. As of 2007, she is the Canadian Auto Workers's national representative for Saskatchewan.

Naylor has campaigned for the CPC-ML on four occasions, and is a member of its Manitoba Regional Committee. She also campaigned for the Canadian Party of Renewal, an affiliate of the CPC-ML, in 1993. She delivered the eulogy at the funeral of Hardial Bains, founder of the CPC-ML, in 1997. The following year, she was selected as chair of a National Commission to Transform CPC(M-L) into a Mass Communist Party.

Naylor is a member of Winnipeg's Structured Movement Against Capitalism. In 2002, she wrote an essay about Canada's anti-globalization movement for the journal Canadian Dimension. After addressing the divisions in communist and socialist movements after World War II, she argues that the greatest challenge now facing the revolutionary Left today is to build "a broad, anti-capitalist, anti-imperialist movement, with the aim of creating a united front against war and militarism, for peace, democracy, national sovereignty and social progress".

Electoral record
| Election | Division | Party | Votes | % | Place | Winner |
|---|---|---|---|---|---|---|
| 1979 federal | Winnipeg—Transcona | Marxist-Leninist | 56 | 0.11 | 5/5 | Bill Blaikie, New Democratic Party |
| 1980 federal | Winnipeg—Transcona | Marxist-Leninist | 60 | 0.13 | 5/5 | Bill Blaikie, New Democratic Party |
| 1988 federal | Winnipeg—Transcona | N/A (Marxist-Leninist) | 115 | 0.27 | 6/6 | Bill Blaikie, New Democratic Party |
| 1993 federal | Winnipeg South Centre | N/A (Renewal) | 76 | | 8/9 | Lloyd Axworthy, Liberal |
| 1997 federal | Winnipeg South Centre | Marxist-Leninist | 180 | | 7/7 | Lloyd Axworthy, Liberal |

=== Ken Kalturnyk (Winnipeg—Transcona) ===
Kenneth (Ken) Kalturnyk is an activist based in Winnipeg, Manitoba. He has been a candidate of the Communist Party of Canada - Marxist-Leninist on five occasions, and is a member of its Manitoba Regional Committee. He is the editor of Modern Communism, the MRC's journal. Kalturnyk is also a member of the Canadian Dimension editorial collective, and has written occasional articles for the paper. He is active in labour issues, and was a founding member of Winnipeg's Workers Organizing and Resource Centre.

Kalturnyk helped to organize Winnipeg's "Structured Movement Against Capitalism" in 2000-01. The organization included members from several activist movements, and placed an emphasis on "reforms which are achievable under capitalism, but which weaken the system, while developing people's organizational capacities".

He wrote an essay entitled "Reflections on Violence" for Canadian Dimension in 2001, examining the questions of "whether violence is a necessary and effective tactic in the conditions prevailing in Canada in the beginning of the 21st century" and "whether violence should be employed as part of a protest". He argued that armed resistance is justifiable in some circumstances, such as the defense of burial grounds by the Mohawk people of Oka in 1990, but concluded that it was not a justified tactic for Canadian activists at the present time:

The use of violence is a tactical issue and not a matter of principle, and while the use of violence by the movement as a response to the violence of the state may ultimately prove necessary, we are not yet at that stage of the struggle. Furthermore, the tactics of violence should be used with extreme caution, as the people are invariably the main victims.

In 2003, Kalturnyk published an essay in Modern Communism arguing that the Holodomor was a hoax perpetrated by right-wing American newspapers and sustained by anti-Soviet propaganda during the Cold War. The article posited that Ukraine was caught up in a "virtual civil war" between Kulaks (rich peasants) and the Soviet system in 1933-34, and argued that food shortages only occurred in the limited areas where peasants took up the Kulak call for an "agricultural strike". This article has been the source of some controversy.

Kalturynk has also written in defense of James Bay Cree land rights, and against the Quebec government's plans for hydro-development in the region. He wrote a piece on the Left and Canadian nationalism in 2002, and a work on the future of Stelco in 2006.

Electoral record
| Election | Division | Party | Votes | % | Place | Winner |
|---|---|---|---|---|---|---|
| 1972 federal | High Park—Humber Valley | N/A (Marxist-Leninist) | 133 | | 5/5 | Otto Jelinek, Progressive Conservative |
| 1980 federal | Selkirk—Interlake | Marxist-Leninist | 97 | | 4/4 | Terry Sargeant, New Democratic Party |
| 1988 federal | Winnipeg South Centre | N/A (Marxist-Leninist) | 111 | | 8/8 | Lloyd Axworthy, Liberal |
| 1993 federal | Winnipeg—Transcona | Marxist-Leninist | 42 | 0.10 | 8/9 | Bill Blaikie, New Democratic Party |
| 1997 federal | Winnipeg—Transcona | Marxist-Leninist | 104 | 0.31 | 7/7 | Bill Blaikie, New Democratic Party |
