= Ivan Franko Museum =

Coordinates: 49.9179°N 97.1485°W

- Location: Winnipeg, Manitoba, Canada

The Ivan Franko Museum is a museum dedicated to Ukrainian writer and poet Ivan Franko (1856–1916) in Winnipeg, Manitoba, Canada.

The museum operates primarily through the efforts of volunteers and relies on the support of people for its financial support. Entrance to the museum has always been free.

Museum is located in Ukrainian Labour Temple at 591 Pritchard Avenue, a designated national historic site.
