= Ukrainian Labour Temple =

Coordinates: 49.9180°N 97.1485°W

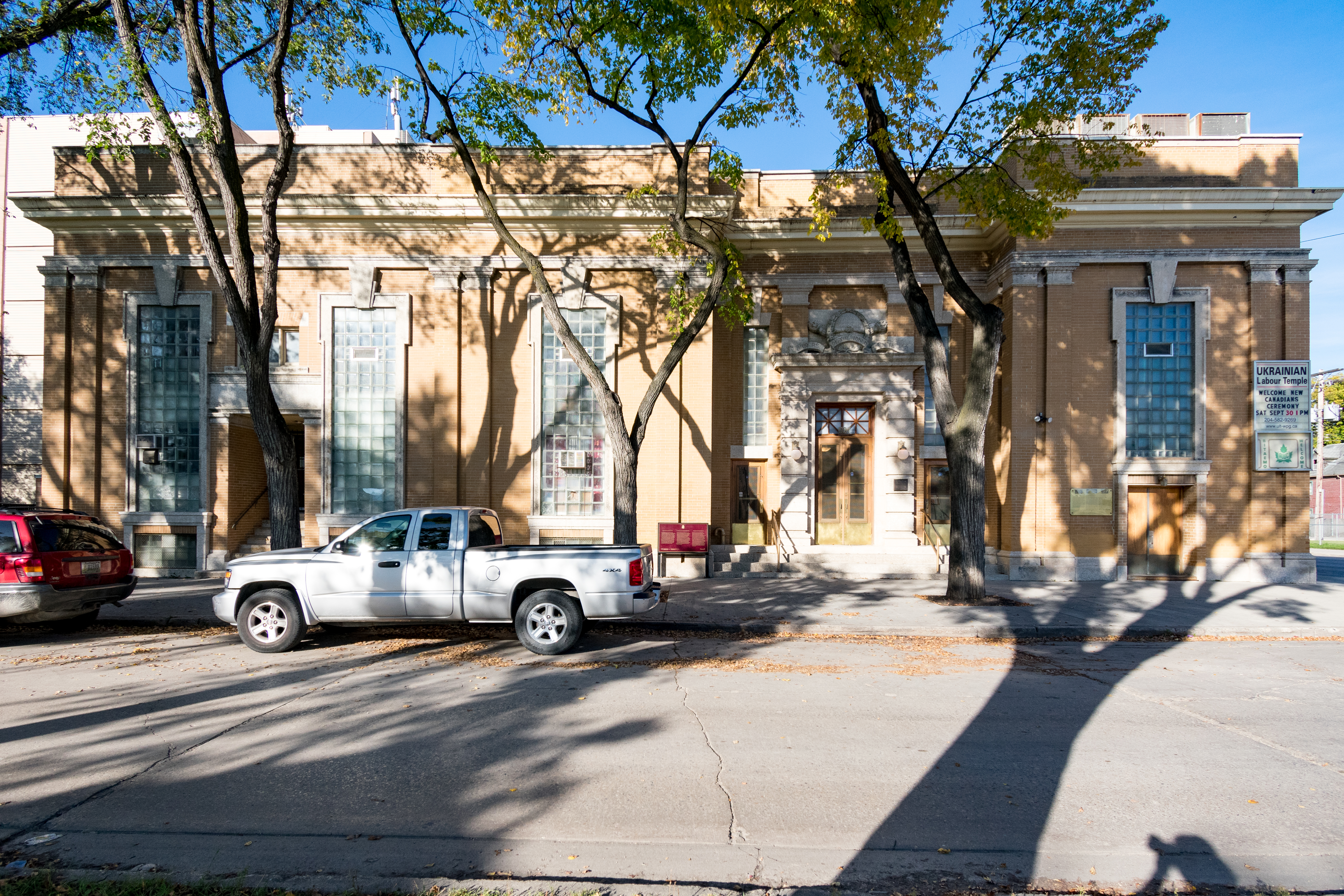
The Ukrainian Labour Temple in the North End of Winnipeg in 2017

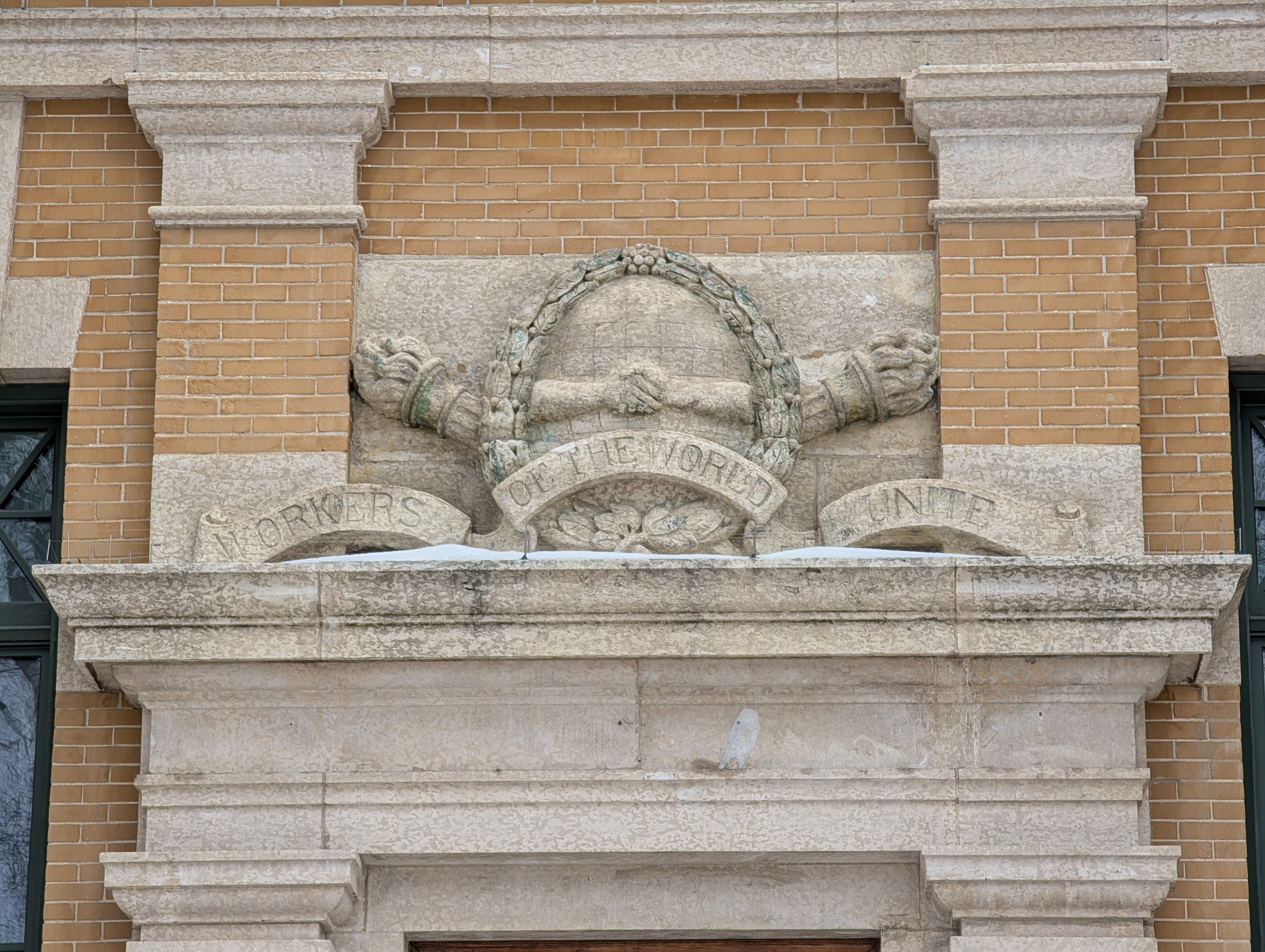
Stone relief with inscription Workers of the world, unite

The Ukrainian Labour Temple is a hall and cultural centre in the north end of Winnipeg, Manitoba. It is run by the Association of United Ukrainian Canadians and is located at 591 Pritchard Avenue.

The Ukrainian labour temple is one of the few left in a once large network of such halls and is one of the largest and oldest of its kind. The building was constructed from 1918 to 19 using volunteer labour. The building was designated a National Historic Site of Canada in 2009. Revonations to the building were undertaken in 2021 to improve accessibility and to restore the windows to their original appearance.

The unity of working people is symbolized over the entrance by a carved stone relief of two clasped hands reaching across the globe, underscored with a ribbon with lettering that reads Workers of the World, Unite.

The building hosts Ivan Franko Museum.

== See also ==
- Association of United Ukrainian Canadians
- 411 Seniors Centre, formerly Vancouver's Labor Temple, where events in the 1918 Vancouver general strike took place
- Finnish Labour Temple, Thunder Bay
- San Francisco Labor Temple
