= Rushnychok =

Ukrainian-Canadian vocal and instrumental ensemble

Rushnychok (stylized in Ukrainian: РУШНИЧОК) was a Ukrainian-Canadian four-person music ensemble from Lachine, Quebec, Canada actively performing from 1969 to 1980 and later for small audiences. Considered the best Ukrainian diaspora ensemble of the 1970s, the four male performers comprising the band were sometimes referred to as the Ukrainian Beatles, and were descendents of Ukrainian emigrants.

== Members ==
- Andrij Harasymowycz—vocals and guitar
- Eugene (Ewhen) Osidacz—accordion
- George (Yurko) Sztyk—bass guitar
- Stepan (Stefan) Andrusiak—drums

== Active years ==
=== Name ===
The term rushnychok in Ukrainian can refer to a diminutive form of embroidered cloth handkerchief wrapped around couples' hands during weddings. It is also the title of an original song composed by Platon Maiboroda with lyrics by Andrij Malyshko, and can refer to an embroidered cloth more generally, in this case an embroidered cloth used as a sign of motherly love. This song, Rushnychok, from which the band shares its name, is featured as the first song on their first released recording. When the group began performing, they played dance and party music, including performances at weddings, and were sometimes referred to as a zabava band. They would later perform internationally, including performance at the Ukrainian National Association's estate, Soyuzivka, in the Catskill Mountains of New York.

=== Style ===
Rushnychok's musical influences included The Beach Boys, The Beatles, and The Rolling Stones as well as Winnipeg's D-Drifter 5 and Montreal's Sheremeta Band. Their music blended traditional styles featuring the accordion with more contemporary styles featuring guitars and percussion. Their decision to perform in full Ukrainian folk costume together with their band's name, was unusual in that most Ukrainian immigrants of the time were reluctant to openly display their national heritage.

In the words of band member Stepan Andrusiak, the group sought to blend "traditional sentiments and contemporary life.". They considered their music to be fun and entertaining. Andrusiak also reflected in 2020 that, "at the core of our repertoire stood songs of valiant fighters for Ukraine’s freedom."

=== First performance and later collaborations ===
The band's first performance was at a new Montreal restaurant and reception hall called La Steppe, on New Year's Eve 1969. Prior to the band's released recordings, Andrij Harasymowycz's older brother, Youra Harasymowycz, was the original accordion player, but left the band to study dentistry. This opened a space for Eugene Osidacz to join the group, who was recruited by Stefan Andrusiak following a university broom ball game. Friend of Stepan Andrusiak and band member, George (Yurko) Sztyk, along with Andrij Harasymowycz and Eugene (Ewhen) Osidacz contributed to original song compositions, collaborating with playwright and poet, Borys Budny.

=== Albums and songs ===
During the period they were active, they released five albums in 1973, 1974, 1976, 1977, and 1980 entitled Volume One, Volume Two, Volume Three, Volume Four, and Volume Five (Special 10th Anniversary Limited Edition).

== Discography ==
Rushnychok I

1973, Sage Promotions, RCA, LP

1. Rushnychok
2. Marichka
3. Yasyny
4. When Trumpets Play
5. Two Colors
6. Chervona Ruta
7. Susidko
8. The Solitary Steed
9. Rozpriahayty Hloptsi Kony
10. My Loved One
11. Carpathian Nights
12. Lubimsia / Lets Get Together
13. Learn Well, My Brothers

Rushnychok II

1974, Sage Promotions, RCA, LP

1. The Whistling Kozaks
2. Chaban
3. The Moon In The Sky
4. Moyi Yasyny
5. Eyes As Dark As The Soil
6. The Mosquito And The Fly
7. Lytsar
8. I Can See The Village
9. A Mist In The Valley
10. The Storm
11. My Homeland

Rushnychok III

1976, Sage Promotions, RCA, LP

1. Canada's Rushnychok
2. We Are Young
3. You
4. Ah! My Love
5. Halychanka
6. The Wedding Song
7. The Ballad Of Yuri Tjutjunnyk
8. Your Winter's Love
9. Listen To My Heart
10. Evening Song
11. The Willow
12. Reflections

Rushnychok IV

1977, Sage Promotions, LP and cassette

1. The Distant Road
2. Verkhovyna, My Land
3. Beloved Girl
4. Concertina
5. Flight Of The Eagles
6. An Evening In May
7. Song Of The Steppes
8. An Embroidery For You
9. Young Love
10. Enchanted Desna
11. Coo-Coo
12. Song Of The Forest
13. Freedom

Rushnychok V

1980, Sage Promotions, LP

1. When Clouds Hide The Sun (Як сонце заслонить)
2. The Moon And The Stars (Місяць і зіроньки)
3. Hmeliu (Ой хмелю)
4. By The River Dunaj (Ой у гаю при Дунаю)
5. Don't Blame Me (Не винуй мене)
6. Ah! Kalyna (А калина не верба)
7. Red Poppies (Маки червоні)
8. When You Find Someone (Як знайдеш ти когось)
9. Silence All Around (Тиша навкруги)
10. Nightingale (Соловію)
11. I Can't Understand (Зрозуміть не вмію досі)
12. So Long Ago (Як давно)

== Later years ==
Andrij Harasymowycz, vocalist and guitar player, died on June 26, 2019, at the age of 72.

== Other references to "Rushnychok" ==
- Rushnychok is the name of an original song composed by Platon Maiboroda, with lyrics by Andrij Malyshko.
- Rushnychok Ukrainian Folk Dance Association is a Ukrainian Canadian dance group.
- Rushnychok is the name of a restaurant in Cherkasy, Ukraine.
- Rushnychok is the name of a retail website.

== See also ==
- Ukrainian folk music
- Ukrainian Canadians
