= Nina Andriievska =

Ukrainian composer and musicologist (1927–2014)

Nina Kostyantynivna Andriievska (Ukrainian: Ні́на Костянти́нівна Андріє́вська; 20 December 1927 – 14 June 2014) was a Ukrainian composer, musicologist, journalist, editor, radio commentator, music and social activist. She was an Honored journalist of the Ukrainian SSR (1983) and an Honored Artist of Ukraine (1998).

== Early life and education ==
Nina Andriievska was born in Kyiv on 20 December 1927. In 1950, she graduated with honors from the Kyiv R. Glier Music School. In 1952, Andriievska graduated from Kyiv Pedagogical Institute, named after A.M.Gorky, and in 1954 – Kyiv Tchaikovsky Conservatory. In 1970, she finished her postgraduate studies there.

== Career ==
Since 1953, Andriievska worked at Ukrainian Radio. She was an editor-in-chief, senior editor, department head, editor-in-chief, and radio commentator of music programs. Andriievska was a member of the National Union of Journalists of Ukraine since 1957 and the National Union of Composers since 1968.

== Works ==
Andriievska is the author of various choirs accompanied by a symphony orchestra and piano, including Fare of Parents, Always Remember, Three Ways, Fly, Spring Wind, Motherland, Keep the Peace, and others. She created romances, solos, songs, arrangements of folk songs for vocal and instrumental ensembles, works for pop orchestras, bandura, accordion, piano, and music for children.

Andriievska wrote a popular song to the words of the poet Lada Reva If I knew how to embroider, which was included in the repertoire of about 50 folk and honored artists. Kostyantyn Ognevy, Dmytro Hnatyuk, Bela Rudenko, Yuri Gulyayev, Lev Leshchenko, Raisa Kyrychenko, Diana Petrynenko, Anatoly Mokrenko, and others performed her works.

Andriievska's writings have been published in the publishing houses "Musical Ukraine," "Mystetstvo," and "A Soviet Composer" (Moscow), as well as on the pages of magazines and newspapers. Her author's gramophone record of songs was published by the Melodiya record company (Moscow), and an author's audio cassette, If I Knew How to Embroider, was published in the USA.

Andriievksa is the author of the book Children's Operas of Mykola Lysenko. She also wrote over 500 articles, reviews in magazines, newspapers, encyclopedias, anthologies, and radio interviews.

== Awards and honors ==
- Certificate of the Presidium of the Verkhovna Rada of Ukraine (1969)
- Medal "For Valiant Labour" (1971)
- Laureate of the International Competition of Composers (Moscow, 1972)
- Laureate of the Ukrainian Creative Competition for the best composition of the year (Kyiv, 1973)
- Distinguished Woman of Cultural Patronage over the Armed Forces of Ukraine (1976)
- Medal "In Commemoration of the 1500th Anniversary of Kyiv" (1983)
- Medal "Veteran of Labour" (1985)
