= Diana Petrynenko =

Ukrainian opera singer and music educator

People's Artist Diana Petrynenko
- Діана Петриненко
- Born: Diana Hnativna Palyvoda; 8 February 1930; Bilousivka, Ukrainian SSR, Soviet Union
- Died: 17 November 2018 (aged 88); Kyiv, Ukraine
- Education: R. Glier Kyiv Institute of Music, Ukrainian National Tchaikovsky Academy of Music
- Occupations: Singer, teacher
- Spouse: Harinald Petrynenko
- Awards: Shevchenko State Prize of Ukrainian SSR (1988)

Diana Hnativna Petrynenko (Ukrainian: Діана Гнатівна Петриненко; née Palyvoda; 8 February 1930 – 17 November 2018) was a Soviet and Ukrainian singer (lyric and coloratura soprano) and pedagogue. People's Artist of the USSR (1975).

== Biography ==
She was born in the village of Bilousivka (now in Cherkasy Oblast, Ukraine). Petrynenko's father, like her mother, had a wonderful voice from birth and maintained an interest in music and Ukrainian folklore in their children. In 1942, Petrynenko's father was shot by the Germans.

In 1947, after the eighth grade, entered the Kyiv College of Music (now the R. Glier Kyiv Institute of Music), and after the third course in 1949 was transferred to the Tchaikovsky Conservatory of Kyiv (now the Ukrainian National Tchaikovsky Academy of Music of Ukraine) (singing class at M.I. Yegorycheva), after graduating from the conservatory, Petrynenko gave birth to a son. In 1961 she graduated from postgraduate study at the conservatory.

From 1955 to 1958 was a soloist of the State Academic Choral Chapel of the Ukrainian SSR "Dumka," from 1962 to 1988 became a soloist of the Kyiv Philharmonic.

The singer's concert repertoire included Ukrainian and Russian folk songs, arias from operas by Glinka, Rimsky-Korsakov, Bellini, Donizetti, Verdi, Rachmaninoff, Grieg, Liszt, and works by Ukrainian composers A. Kos-Anatolsky, Yu. Meitus, H. Maiboroda, P. Maiboroda, M. Lysenko, D. Sichinsky, Ya. Stepovy, K. Stetsenko, O. Bilash.

She performed soprano parts in the 9th symphony of Ludwig van Beethoven, the oratorio The Seasons by Haydn, Requiem by Mozart, cantata "Rejoice, nivo nepolitaya" by N. V. Lysenko.

The talent of the singer was noted in other countries: she repeatedly went abroad, performed on the stages of Poland, Finland, Yugoslavia, France, Japan, Italy, Czechoslovakia, US, East Germany, Canada, Hungary. Also during her successful activities, Petrynenko became a performer of songs in the films Only You and Lada from the Land of the Berendei, recorded on phonograph records.

Since 1961 she taught in Kyiv at the Ukrainian National Tchaikovsky Academy of Music.

Since 1981 she was an associate professor, and since 1985 became a professor at the Kyiv Conservatory.

Petrynenko died on 17 November 2018, at the age of 88. Three days later she was buried at the Baikove Cemetery in Kyiv.

== Family ==
Diana Petrynenko was married to Ukrainian journalist and musician Harinald Petrinenko, host of the television show about folk art "Chistiy kolodets". On 10 March 1953, their son Taras Petrynenko was born, who later became a singer, composer, poet, and People's Artist of Ukraine (1999).

Her brother was Ivan Hnatovych Palyvoda (1924–2004), an opera singer and vocal teacher.

== Titles and awards ==
- Laureate of the VII World Festival of Youth and Students in Vienna (2nd prize, 1959);
- Medal "For Labour Valour" (1960) – for outstanding labour in the development of Soviet literature and art and in connection with the decade of Ukrainian literature and art in Moscow;
- Honored Artist of the Ukrainian SSR (1965);
- People's Artist of the Ukrainian SSR (1970);
- Shevchenko National Prize (1972) – for concert programs from 1969 to 1971;
- People's Artist of the USSR (1975) – for great merits in the development of Soviet musical art;
- Order of Princess Olga, 3rd degree (2005);
- Order of the Red Banner of Labour;
- Medal "In Commemoration of the 1500th Anniversary of Kyiv"

== Legacy ==
On 22 February 2021, a memorial plaque to Petrynenko was unveiled at the National Academy of Music of Ukraine. In his congratulatory speech, the head of the Opera Singing Department, Oleksandr Dyachenko, described Petrynenko as an example of a real teacher, "whose pupils proudly carry the glorious traditions of the Kyiv Conservatory far beyond the borders of Ukraine".
