= Yaroslav the Wise (disambiguation) =

Yaroslav the Wise was the Grand Prince of Novgorod and Kiev.

Yaroslav the Wise may also refer to:

- Order of Prince Yaroslav the Wise, a Ukrainian order
- Yaroslav Mudriy, a biographical opera about Yaroslav's life by Heorhiy Maiboroda
- Yaroslav-the-Wise Novgorod State University, a university in Veliky Novgorod, Russia
- Russian frigate Yaroslav Mudry, Russian Neustrashimy-class frigate
