= Malyshko =

Malyshko is a Ukrainian-language surname. Notable people with the surname include:

- Andriy Malyshko (1912–1970), Soviet and Ukrainian poet, translator, and literary critic
- Dmitry Malyshko (born 1987), Russian biathlete
