= The Voice Kids (Ukrainian TV series) season 2 =

The Voice Kids
- Season 2
- Presented by: Kateryna Osadcha; Yuri Gorbunov
- Coaches: Tina Karol; Potap; Natalia Mohylevska
- Winner: Roman Sasanchin
- Winning mentor: Tina Karol
- Runners-up: Michael King and Anastasia Bahinska

Release
- Original network: 1+1
- Original release: 1 February – 1 March 2015

Season chronology
- ← Previous; Season 1 Next → Season 3

The Voice Kids is a Ukrainian television music competition created to find new singing talent. The second season began airing on 1 February 2015 on 1+1. Tina Karol returned as a coach, while Potap and Natalia Mohilevska joined the show as replacements for former coaches, Oleg Skrypka and Svetlana Loboda. Yuri Gorbunov presented the show for the first time, replacing Andrii Domanskyi.

== Coaches and finalists ==
– Winning coach/contestant. Winners are in bold, eliminated contestants in small font.
– Runner-up coach/contestant. Final contestant first listed.
- Third Place coach/contestant. Final contestant first listed.

Judges/coaches
Tina Karol	Potap	Natalia Mohylevska
– **Roman Sasanchin** – Ruslan Aslanov	– Anastasia Bahinska – Ivan Lesnoy	– Michael King – Bogdan Temchenko

== Blind auditions ==
During the Blind auditions, each coach must now form a team of 15 young artists.

It airs from 1 February.

Color key

✔	Coach hit his/her "I WANT YOU" button
	Artist defaulted to this coach's team
	Artist elected to join this coach's team
	Artist eliminated with no coach pressing his or her "I WANT YOU" button

=== Episode 1 (1 February) ===
Order	Artist	Age	Hometown	Song	Coach's and contestant's choices		
Order	Artist	Age	Hometown	Song	Tina	Potap	Natalia
1	Anna Komyakova	7	Illichivsk	"Smile"	✔	✔	✔
2	Ruslan Aslanov	12	Minsk, Belarus	"Mamma Knows Best"	✔	✔	✔
3	Ulyana Isachenko	11	Kryvyi Rih	"Zima"	–	✔	✔
4	Galina Dubok	9	Kyiv	"Zhizn Prodolzhaetsja"	–	–	–
5	Roman Parfenyuk	13	Kryliv	"Bez boyu"	–	✔	–
6	Katerina Kravchenko	14	Balta	"Air Mail Special"	✔	✔	✔
7	Daryna Halytskaya	9	Kharkiv	"Ne plach"	–	✔	✔
8	Elizaveta Kireeva	10	Kramatorsk	"Moya babushka kurit trubku"	–	–	–
9	Bogdan Temchenko	14	Kyiv	"Smells Like Teen Spirit"	✔	–	✔
10	Anastasia Lisukh and Anastasia Zavadskaya	12/10	Netishyn	"Demon Kitty Rag"	✔	✔	–
11	Alina Kostyuk	12	Kherson	"Rano-rano"	✔	✔	–
12	Arseny Danilyuk	13	Shypyntsi	"Jamaica"	✔	–	–
13	Ilya Paladin	12	Kyiv	"Kiss"	–	–	–
14	Ulyana Baranyuk	13	Kalynivka	"Tough Lover"	✔	✔	–
15	Roman Sasanchin	12	Sadky	"Pisnya pro rushnyk"	✔	✔	✔

=== Episode 2 (8 February) ===
Order	Artist	Age	Hometown	Song	Coach's and contestant's choices		
Order	Artist	Age	Hometown	Song	Tina	Potap	Natalia
1	Pollianna Ryzhak	11	Dunaivtsi	"And I Am Telling You I'm Not Going"	✔	✔	✔
2	Anastasia Radchenko	13	Khomutets	"Oy, rode nash krasnyy"	✔	✔	–
3	Yana Strelchenko	12	Lyepyel, Belarus	"Mama"	–	–	–
4	Vasily Demchuk	14	Golovaki	"Hello"	–	✔	–
5	Anastasia Bahinska	9	Bila Tserkva	"Malo"	✔	✔	–
6	Nikita Trondin	14	Dnipropetrovsk	"Rise Like a Phoenix"	✔	✔	–
7	Dayana Shavadze	13	Batumi, Georgia	"Chornobravtsi"	–	–	–
8	Katerina Manuzina	9	Bila Tserkva	"Harmon"	–	✔	–
9	Alie Bekirova	14	Crimea	"Dohtur"	✔	✔	✔
10	Sofia Yatsenyuk	10	Kyiv	"Sunny"	–	–	–
11	Alexander Chishy	14	Volodymyr-Volynskyi	"I Have Nothing"	✔	✔	–
12	Ekaterina Rychkova	12	Kalush	"Der Hölle Rache kocht in meinem Herzen from opera The Magic Flute"	–	–	–
13	Karina Kazaryan	14	Odesa	"Varto chy ni"	–	–	✔
14	Mark Kovalenko	13	Mykolaiv	"Krylatyye kacheli"	✔	–	–
15	Anna Trincher	13	Kyiv	"Let It Be"	✔	–	✔
16	Victoria Balashova	12	Kherson	"Oy, ya divchyna Poltavka"	✔	✔	✔

=== Episode 3 (15 February) ===
Order	Artist	Age	Hometown	Song	Coach's and contestant's choices		
Order	Artist	Age	Hometown	Song	Tina	Potap	Natalia
1	Diana Pihun	13	Hnivan	"The Power of Love"	✔	✔	–
2	Violetta Litvinenko	14	Kyiv	"Sweet Dreams (Are Made of This)"	✔	✔	✔
3	Sergey Ivanchenko	11	Kryvyi Rih	"The Final Countdown"	–	–	–
4	Daria Sorokina	12	Brovary	"Zozulya"	–	–	✔
5	Victor Papp	14	Uzhhorod	"Choroniyi brovy, kariyi ochi"	✔	–	–
6	Elizaveta Savina	14	Mykolaiv	"Oy, ne svity misyachenku"	Team full	✔	✔
7	Aleksandra Sirkasheva	13	Lviv	"Sway"	Team full	✔	–
8	Anastasia Mikityuk	10	Khmelnytskyi	"Vidma"	Team full	✔	✔
9	Ivan Lesnoy	13	Dniprodzerzhynsk	"Une vie d'amour"	Team full	✔	–
10	Katerina Kachanovskaya	14	Rivne	"Nizhno"	Team full	–	✔
11	Anna Muzafarova	12	Chelyabinsk, Russia	"One Night Only"	Team full	✔	–
12	Nina Boykova	11	Kyiv	"Vesna-krasna"	Team full	Team full	–
13	Michael King	14	Chernivtsi	"Adagio"	Team full	Team full	✔
14	Natalia Povstyana	12	Brovary	"Kayus"	Team full	Team full	–
15	Sofia Volashanenko	12	Odesa	"Za lesami, gorami"	Team full	Team full	✔

== The Battles ==
In the second stage, called the battle phase, coaches have three of their team members battle against each other directly by singing the same song together, with the coach choosing which team member to advance from each of individual "battles" into the Sing-Off stage.

Color key

Artist won the Battle and advanced to the Sing-Off
Artist lost the Battle and was eliminated

=== Episode 4 ===
Episode	Coach	Order	Winner	Song	Losers
Episode 4 (21 February)	Tina Karol	1	Roman	"Ukraina"	Victor, Arseny
Episode 4 (21 February)	Potap	2	Katerina	"Wrecking Ball"	Anna, Anastasia and Anastasia
Episode 4 (21 February)	Natalia Mohylevska	3	Anna	"Vodohray"	Daria, Ulyana
Episode 4 (21 February)	Tina Karol	4	Mark	"Kvitka-dusha"	Alie, Alina
Episode 4 (21 February)	Potap	5	Ivan	"Sous Le Ciel de Paris"	Diana, Aleksandra
Episode 4 (21 February)	Natalia Mohylevska	6	Katerina	"Vilnyy ptakh"	Elizaveta, Violetta
Episode 4 (21 February)	Tina Karol	7	Nikita	"Namalyuy meni nich"	Victoria, Katerina
Episode 4 (21 February)	Potap	8	Pollianna	"De ty teper"	Vasily, Anastasia
Episode 4 (21 February)	Natalia Mohylevska	9	Bogdan	"The House of the Rising Sun"	Karina, Daryna
Episode	Coach	Order	Winner	Song	Losers
Episode 5 (22 February)	Potap	1	Anastasia B.	"Try porady"	Anastasia R., Roman
Episode 5 (22 February)	Tina Karol	2	Ruslan	"Kraina mriy"	Ulyana, Alexander
Episode 5 (22 February)	Natalia Mohylevska	3	Michael	"The Show Must Go On"	Anna, Sofia

== The Sing-Off ==
Each coach brought his or her team after the "Battle" back to four acts, but there were only two candidates to the final. All four contestants will battle each other in "The Sing-Off", where they re-sung their audition song. The coaches then selected two of the four contestants to move to the live finals.

Color key

Artist advanced to the Final
Artist was eliminated

=== Episode 5 (22 February) ===
Coach	Order	Artist	Song	Result
Tina Karol	1	Mark Kovalenko	"Krylatyye kacheli"	Eliminated
Tina Karol	2	Ruslan Aslanov	"Mamma Knows Best"	Tina's choice
Tina Karol	3	Roman Sasanchin	"Pisnya pro rushnyk"	Tina's choice
Tina Karol	4	Nikita Trondin	"Rise Like a Phoenix"	Eliminated
Potap	1	Katerina Manuzina	"Harmon"	Eliminated
Potap	2	Ivan Lesnoy	"Une vie d'amour"	Potap's choice
Potap	3	Anastasia Bahinska	"Malo"	Potap's choice
Potap	4	Pollianna Ryzhak	"And I Am Telling You I'm Not Going"	Eliminated
Natalia Mohylevska	1	Anna Komyakova	"Smile"	Eliminated
Natalia Mohylevska	2	Katerina Kachanovskaya	"Nizhno"	Eliminated
Natalia Mohylevska	3	Michael King	"Adagio"	Natalia's choice
Natalia Mohylevska	4	Bogdan Temchenko	"Smells Like Teen Spirit"	Natalia's choice

== Final ==
=== Episode 6 (1 March) ===
==== Round 1 ====
In this phase of the competition, each of the top six finalists took the stage and performed a solo song. The television audience choose the final three artists who advanced to the next round.

Coach	Order	Artist	Song	Result
Natalia Mohylevska	1	Michael King	"Vesna"	Public's сhoice
Natalia Mohylevska	2	Bogdan Temchenko	"8 kolir"	Eliminated
Potap	3	Anastasia Bahinska	"Usmekhnisya meni"	Public's сhoice
Potap	4	Ivan Lesnoy	"Ballada o materi"	Eliminated
Tina Karol	5	Ruslan Aslanov	"Bohemian Rhapsody"	Eliminated
Tina Karol	6	Roman Sasanchin	"Odna kalina"	Public's сhoice

Non-competition performances
Order	Performer	Song
1	Tina Karol, Potap and Natalia Mohylevska (Coaches of Holos. Dity)	"Pisnya bude pomizh nas"
2	Natalia Mohylevska and her team (Michael King and Bogdan Temchenko)	"Summertime and Oh, khodyt son"
3	Potap and his team (Anastasia Bahinska and Ivan Lesnoy)	"Chumachechaya vesna"
4	Tina Karol and her team (Ruslan Aslanov and Roman Sasanchin)	"Ukraina — tse ty"

==== Round 2 ====
The final round of the competition featured the top three finalists performed a solo song. Before the start of the performances, voting lines were opened live-in-show for the television audience to vote for the final three and decide the winner. The winner of The Voice Kids was announced at the end of the show.

Order	Coach	Artist	Song	Result
1	Potap	Anastasia Bahinska	"Mir bez voyny"	Runner-up
2	Tina Karol	Roman Sasanchin	"Dyvlyus ya na nebo"	Winner
3	Natalia Mohylevska	Michael King	"Dva kolory"	Third Place

Non-competition performances
Order	Performer	Song
1	Alekseev (Participant of The Voice Of Ukraine)	"Vse uspet"
2	Marlen (Participant of The Voice Of Ukraine)	"Lyubov ili Obman"
