= Platon Maiboroda =

Ukrainian composer and educator

Platon Maiboroda Платон Майборода

Background information
- Born: 1 December 1918; Pelekhivshchyna, Russian Empire
- Died: 8 July 1989 (aged 70) Kyiv, Ukrainian SSR, Soviet Union
- Genre: Classical
- Occupations: Composer; Music teacher; Folklorist
- Instrument: Piano

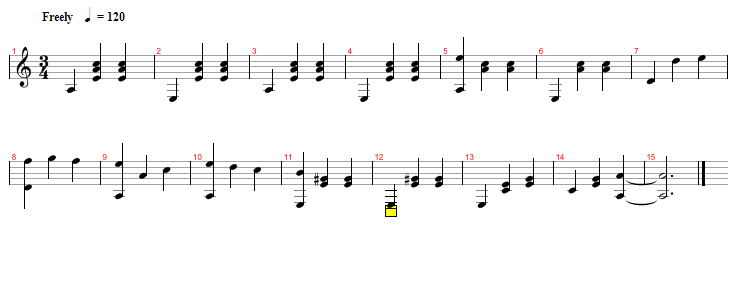
Notes of the Kyiv Waltz

Platon Ilarionovych Maiboroda (Ukrainian: Платон Іларіонович Майборода; 1 December 1918 – 8 July 1989) was a Soviet and Ukrainian composer and educator.

Maiboroda, whose brother Heorhiy Maiboroda was also a composer, studied at the Gliere Music College. In 1938 Maiboroda enrolled in the Kyiv Conservatory in Kyiv where he studied under Levko Revutsky, graduating in 1947. Maiboroda taught at the Gliere Music College from 1947 to 1950.

He was buried at the Baikove Cemetery, Kyiv.

== Works ==
=== Films ===
- Valley of Blue Rocks (1956)
- Far and Near (1957)
- Thunder Over Fields (1958)
- Shift Starts at Six (1958)
- Ages of Youth (1958)
- Blood of Man - Not a Water (1960)
- Dmytro Horytsvit (1961)
- Ukrainian Rhapsody (1961)
- People Don't Know Everything (1964)
- Ballad of British (1969)
- The Applicant (1973)
- Adieu, Pharaohs! (1975)
- Ordinary Concerns (1975)
- Involuntary Diplomats (1978)
- Smotriny (1979)
- Visit to Kovalivka (1980)

=== Selected songs ===
- Song about the Towel (words of Andriy Malyshko), soundtrack to the film Ages of Youth (1958)
- Kyiv Waltz (words of Andriy Malyshko)

== Awards ==
- Stalin Prize, 3rd class (1950) - for songs "About Olena Khobta", "About Mark Ozerny", "About Maria Lysenko"
- Shevchenko National Prize (1962)
- Honored Art Worker of the Ukrainian SSR (1958)
- People's Artist of the Ukrainian SSR (1968)
- People's Artist of the USSR (1979)
- Order of Lenin (1960)
- Order of the Red Banner of Labour (1982)
- Jubilee Medal "In Commemoration of the 100th Anniversary of the Birth of Vladimir Ilyich Lenin"
- Medal "In Commemoration of the 1500th Anniversary of Kyiv"
