= Ukrainian Rhapsody =

- Ukrainian: Українська рапсодія
- Directed by: Sergei Parajanov
- Written by: Aleksandr Levada
- Starring: Olga Reus-Petrenko; Yevgenia Miroshnichenko; Eduard Koshman; Yuriy Gulyayev; Natalya Uzhviy
- Cinematography: Ivan Shekker
- Edited by: M. Ponomarenko
- Music by: Platon Maiboroda
- Release date: 1961
- Country: Soviet Union
- Language: Russian

Ukrainian Rhapsody (Ukrainian: "Українська рапсодія") is a 1961 Soviet drama film directed by Sergei Parajanov.

== Plot ==
The film takes place during the war. In the center of the plot is a man named Anton, who is captured. He manages to escape and hide in the house of an organist. American troops are entering the city, and Anton cannot leave the city because of the ban. His beloved Oksana from the Ukrainian village is still waiting for him.

== Cast ==
- Olga Reus-Petrenko as Oksana Marchenko
- Yevgenia Miroshnichenko as Oksana Marchenko (singing voice)
- Eduard Koshman as Anton Petrenko
- Yuriy Gulyayev as Vadim
- Natalya Uzhviy as Nadyezhda Petrovna
- Aleksandr Gai as Vayner
- Valeriy Vitter as Rudi
- Stepan Shkurat as Grandfather
- Sergey Petrov as Jury chairman (as S. Petrov)
