= Trista let tomu... =

- Directed by: Vladimir Petrov
- Starring: Sergey Dvoretskiy; Vasiliy Lanovoy; Natalya Uzhviy
- Release date: 1956
- Country: Soviet Union
- Language: Russian

Trista let tomu... (Three hundred years ago) is a 1956 Soviet historical drama film directed by Vladimir Petrov and starring Sergey Dvoretskiy, Vasiliy Lanovoy and Natalya Uzhviy.

== Plot ==
In the mid-17th century (1654), Ukrainian peasants and Cossacks rose up against Polish nobility and aristocratic oppression. The Liberation War was led by Bohdan Khmelnytsky, who decisively guided the uprising toward an alliance with Russia. Standing by his side were his valiant companions—Cossack colonels Ivan Bohun, Maksym Kryvonis, Ivan Hanja, and Sokolov.

== Cast ==
- Sergey Dvoretskiy - Andrey Zhurba
- Vasiliy Lanovoy -
- Natalya Uzhviy -
