= Natalia Uzhviy =

Ukrainian actress (1898–1986)

Natalia Uzhviy Shevchenko National Prize laureate
- Наталія Ужвій
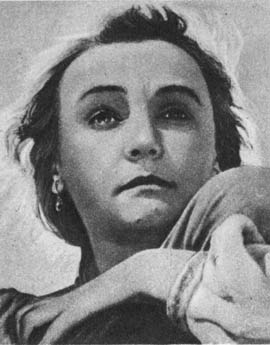
- Uzviy playing in Nazar Stodolia, 1936
- Born: 8 September 1898; Liuboml, Volhynian Governorate, Russian Empire (now Ukraine)
- Died: 29 June 1986 or 22 June 1986 (aged 87); Kyiv, Ukrainian SSR, Soviet Union (now Ukraine)
- Resting place: Baikove Cemetery
- Political party: Communist Party of the Soviet Union (from 1945)
- Awards: State Stalin Prize; Order of Lenin; Hero of Socialist Labour; People's Artist of the USSR; and others

Natalia Mykhailivna Uzhviy (Ukrainian: Наталія Михайлівна Ужвій; 8 September [O.S. 27 August] 1898 – 22 or 29 July 1986) was a Ukrainian drama and cinema actress who achieved prominence performing in a variety of roles.

== Biography ==
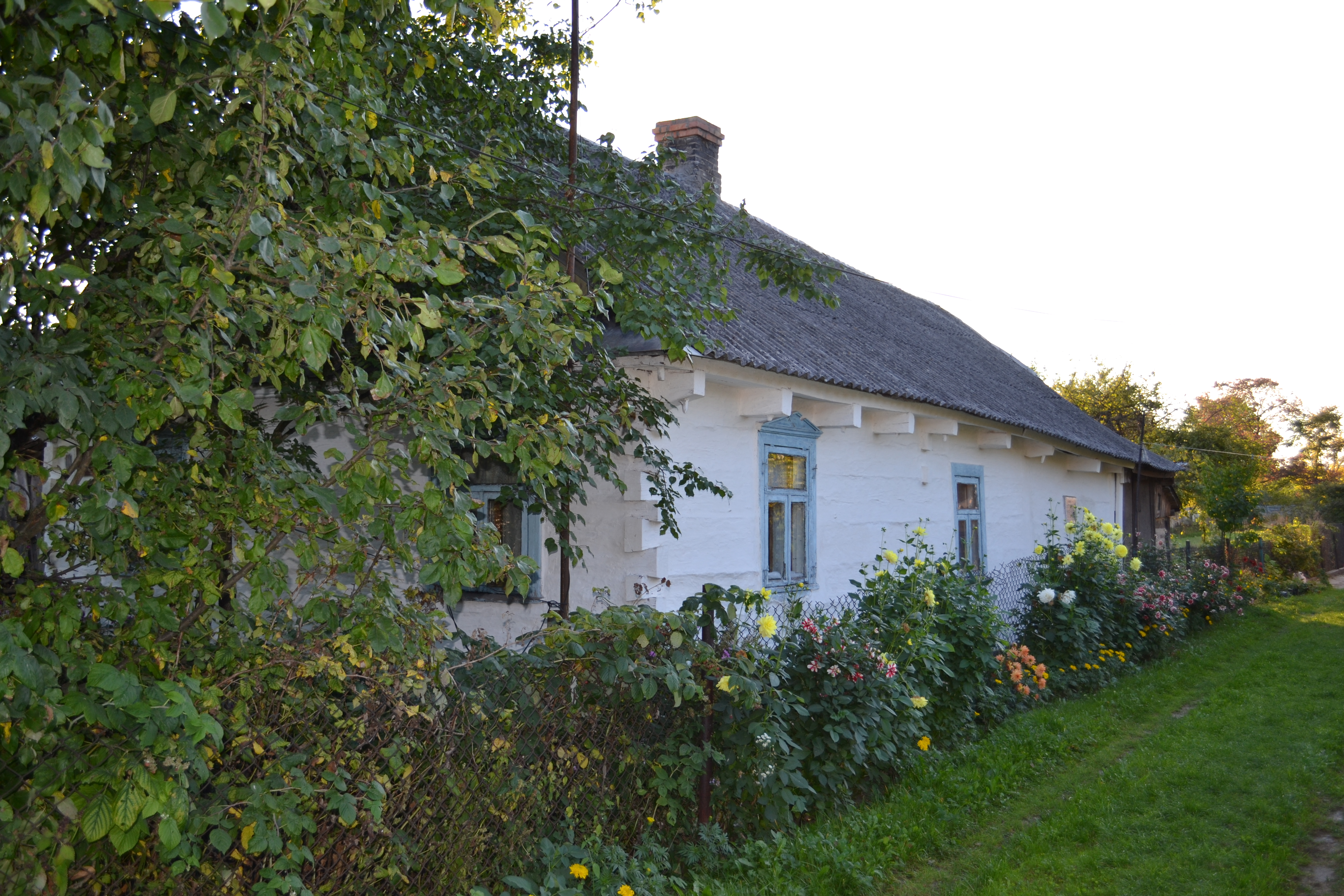
The house where Natalia Uzhviy was born.

Natalia Uzhviy was born on 8 September 1898 in Liuboml, Volhynia and was the oldest of 7 children.

In 1922–1925, she studied at the Drama Studios at the First State Drama Theater of the Ukrainian SSR named after Taras Shevchenko in Kyiv and performed on its stage. In 1925–1926, she worked at the Odesa State Ukrainian Drama Theater. In Odesa, she played her first role in the cinema as Hala Dombrovskaya in the film "P.K.P.". Between 1926 and 1934 Uzhviy worked at the Berezil Theatre, where she reached the peak of her talent. She later moved to the Kharkiv Ukrainian Drama Theatre, and starting from 1936 performed at the Ivan Franko National Academic Drama Theater in Kyiv.

== Works ==
During her career Uzhviy played in around 90 theatrical roles and appeared in 20 films. She was actively employed in dramas by Oleksandr Korniychuk, Oleksandr Levada, Mykola Zarudny and other Soviet authors.

=== Theater ===
- Tripes d'Or (Fernand Crommelynck, 1926) – Froumence
- Le roi s'amuse (Victor Hugo, 1927) – Maguelonne
- Fiesco (Friedrich Schiller, 1928) – Julia
- Myna Mazailo (Mykola Kulish, 1929) – Aunt Motia
- Cadres (Ivan Mykytenko, 1931) – Chereda
- Last Victim (Alexander Ostrovsky, 1939) – Tugina
- Much Ado About Nothing (Shakespeare, 1940) – Beatrice

=== Filmography ===
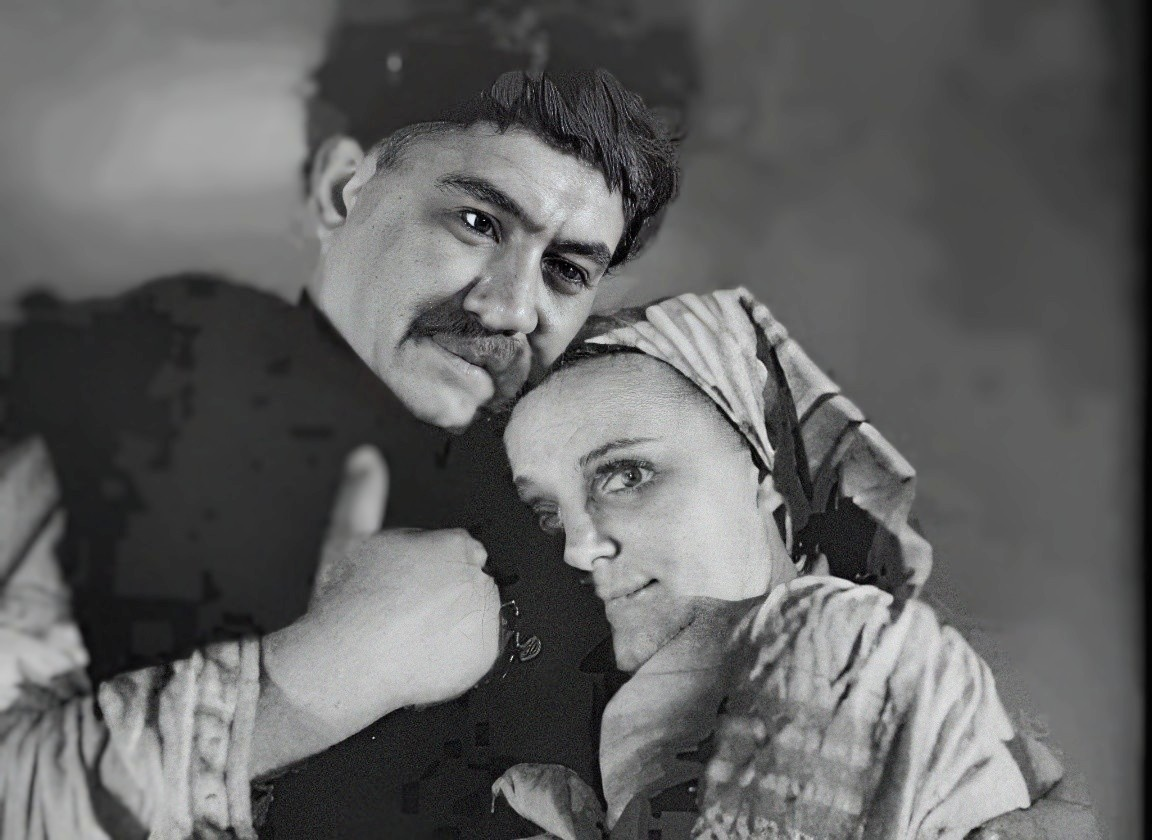
Uzhviy with Alexander Khvylya in Karmeliuk

- Taras Shevchenko (1926) – Yaryna
- P.K.P. (1926) – Galya Dombrovskaya
- Taras Tryasylo (1927) – Maryna
- Prometheus (1936) – Nastasya Markovna
- Ya lyublyu (1936) – Gorpina
- Nazar Stodolya (1937) – Stekha
- Karmelyuk (1938) – Olyana
- The Vyborg Side (1939) – Yevdokia Ivanovna Kozlova
- Mayskaya noch (1940) – Sister-in-law
- Partizany v stepyakh Ukrainy (1943) – Pelageya Chasnyk
- Rainbow (1944) – Olena Kostyuk
- Taras Shevchenko (1951) – Yarina Shevchenko
- Ukradene shchastia (1952) – Anna Zadorozhnia
- Kalinovaya roshcha (1953) – Natalya Kovshik
- Zemlya (1954) – Maria Fedorchuk
- Trista let tomu... (1956) – Varvara
- Plamya gneva (1956)
- Bez vesti propavshiy (1956) – Marfa
- Ukrainian Rhapsody (1961) – Nadyezhda Petrovna
- Poj pesnyu, poet (1973)

== Awards ==
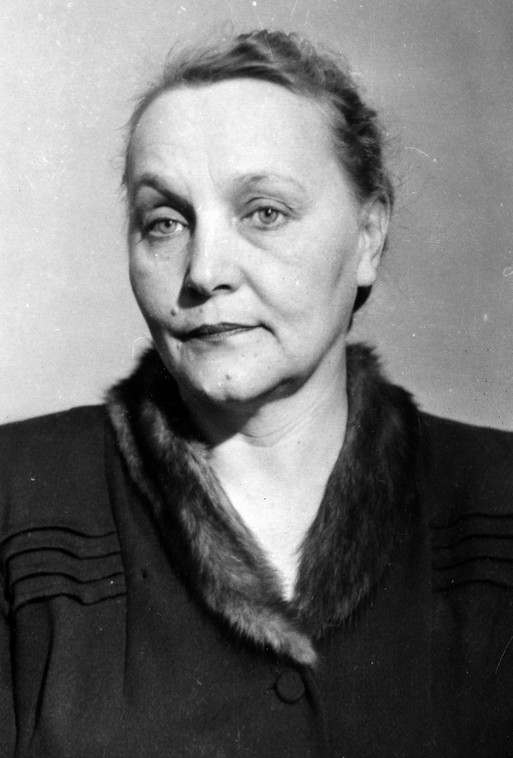
Natalia Uzhviy in 1951

- Order of the Red Banner of Labour (1939, 1948, 1951, ?)
- Order of the Badge of Honour (1940)
- People's Artist of the USSR (1944)
- Order of Lenin (1944, 1960, 1968, 1973)
- Stalin Prizes first degree (1946)
- Two Stalin Prizes second degree (1949, 1951)
- Hero of Socialist Labour (1973)
- Order of Friendship of Peoples (1978)
- Shevchenko State Prize of Ukrainian SSR (1984)
