= Rushnyk =

East Slavic ritual embroidered cloth

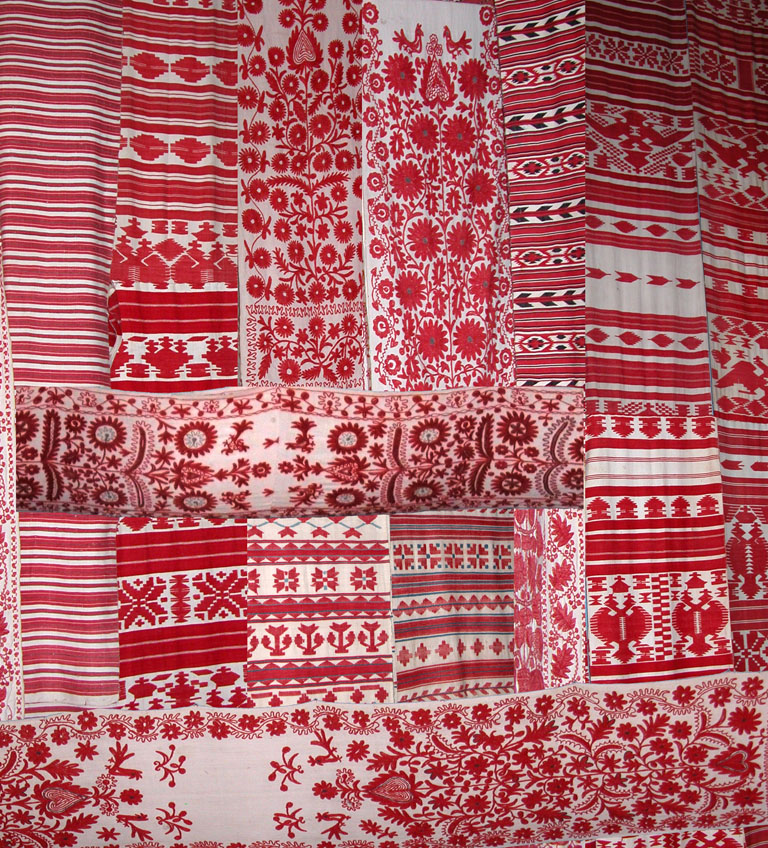
Rushnyk - Ukrainian embroidered and woven ritual cloth. Pereiaslav, Ukraine.

A rushnyk or rushnik (Ukrainian: рушник [rʊʃˈnɪk]; Belarusian: ручнік [rut͡ʂˈnʲik]; Russian: ручник, рушник [rʊtɕˈnʲik], [rʊʂˈnʲik]; Rusyn: ручник) is a decorative and ritual cloth. Made of linen or cotton it usually represents woven or embroidered designs, symbols and cryptograms of the ancient world. They have been used in sacred East Slavic rituals, religious services and ceremonial events such as weddings and funerals. Each region has its own designs and patterns with hidden meaning, passed down from generation to generation and studied by ethnographers.

There are many rushnyk collections in ethnographic museums. In Ukraine, the Rushnyk Museum is located in Pereiaslav, Ukraine as part of The Museum of Folk Architecture and Way of Life of Central Naddniprianshchyna. A Russian rushnik collection is housed at the Hermitage Museum.

== Meaning ==
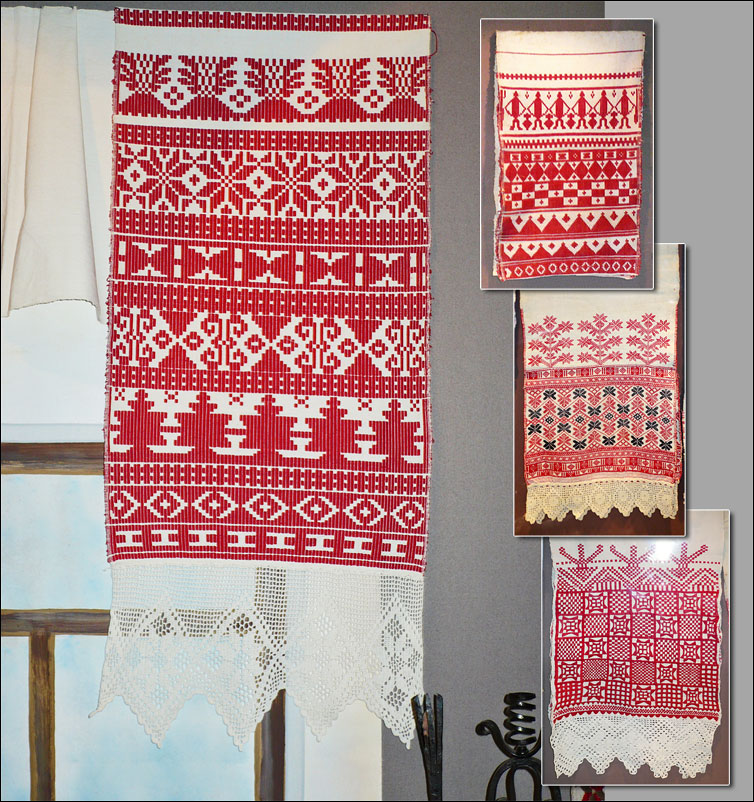
Belgorod rushniks, Central Russia

The rectangular shape of the fabric indicates a life's journey and the ornamentation captures the cultural ancestral memory of the region. The material used is either linen or hemp. The act of spinning thread and the process of weaving linen embodies spiritual power dating back to the ancient deity Mokosh who is often represented in embroidery. The needle has its own energy, an idea similar to acupuncture, and the color of the thread has sacred meaning. Red represents life and is the main color used. A rushnyk is given to a baby at birth, it follows the person throughout life and is used in the funeral service after death.

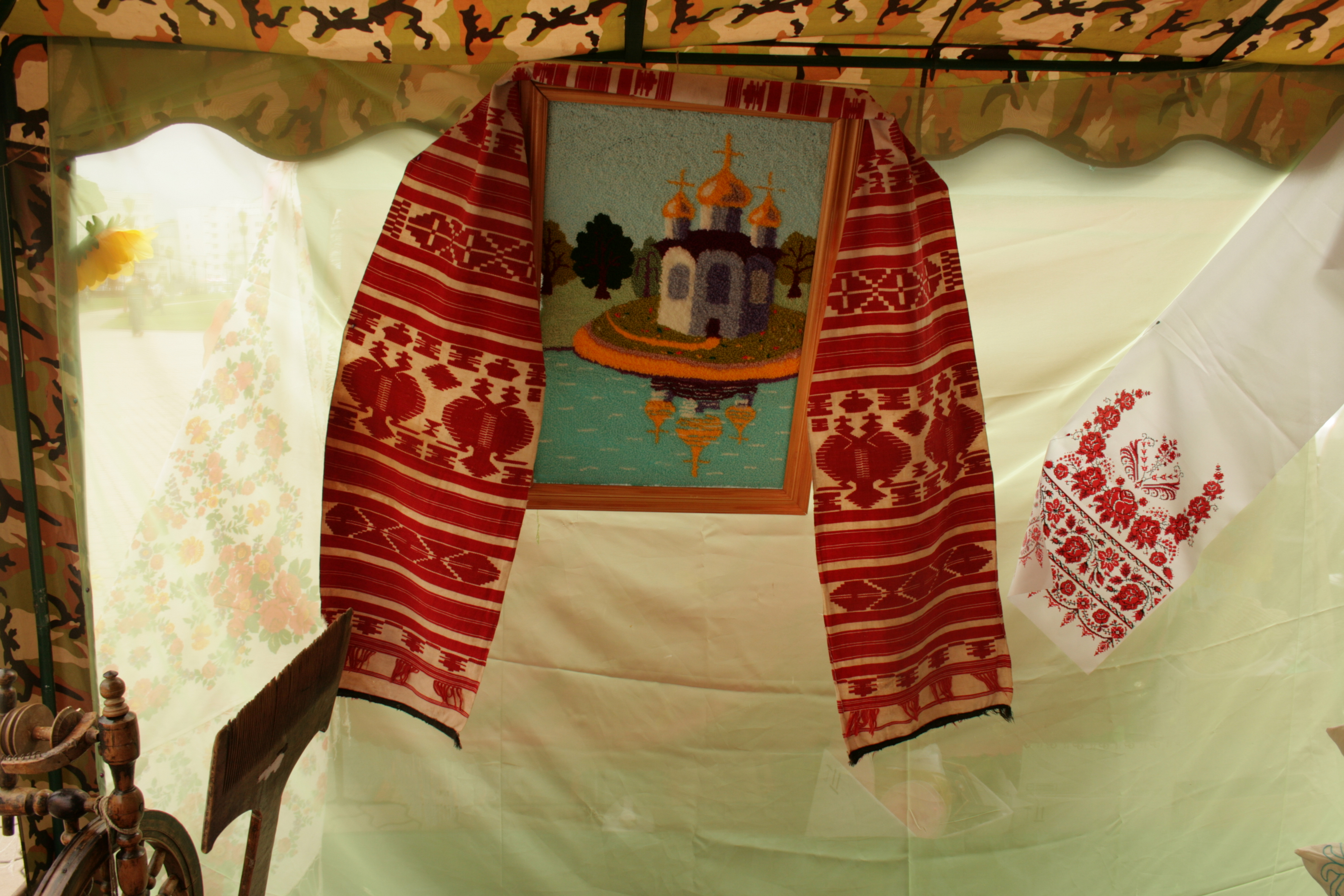
Rushniks play in Russia an important part in the Eastern Orthodox Church. It used to be very common to decorate the icons with Rushniks, this tradition is still common.

== Uses ==
Ručnik pattern on the flag of Belarus

A Rushnyk has many uses. The very basic rushnyk is colloquially called the utyralnyk or wiper and serves as a towel. The utyralnyk either has no designs on it or it has very narrow strip on the edges. In contrast, a nabozhnyk is a highly decorated Rushnyk composing of embroidery and of lace. Nabozhnyks, also called nabraznyks or nakutnyks are used to decorate icons and icon corners in homes.

== Wedding rushnyks and motifs ==
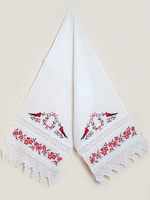
Rushnyk

Colour plays a very important symbolic role in traditional Slavic embroidery. Red is the colour of life, the sun, fertility and health. The majority of rushnyks are embroidered with red threads. The very word "red" means "beautiful" and "splendid" in Old Russian and Ruthenian: a red girl, a red sun or a red spring. The phrase Krasnaya devitsa in Old Russian language for example is an old idiomatic expression which means beautiful girl, the word Krasnaya translates in Russian language also into red. The diamond-shaped design of the rushnyk is an ancient agricultural symbol, which means a sown field, or the sun, and expresses the idea of fertility and protection against evil. Ducks, in the centre of the rushnyk, symbolize the element of life-giving water. In wedding folklore a duck and a drake symbolize a bride and a groom, in other words a pair of ducks is a symbol of family life. Another common symbol on rushnyks are birds.

During a wedding ceremony, the bride and groom stand on a Rushnyk called a pidnozhnyk, which translates as step-on towel. What happens to the pidnozhnyk is that the bride will drag the towel behind her, and her bridesmaids follow behind her. Tradition has it that when the bridesmaids follow behind the pidnozhnyk, they are following the path of the bride and will hopefully be married.

== Etymology ==
Words with the common suffix "-nyk" ("-nik"), denoting agent nouns, indicate a general association of the new word with the base one.

- Rushnyk: from ruka, hand
- Na-: a prefix meaning "on", i.e., the thing is supposed to be put onto something
  - Nabozhnyk: from Boh, God
  - Naobraznyk: from obraz, literally "image", meaning "God's image", i.e., icon
  - Nakutnyk: from kut, corner, meaning the corner where an icon is hung (by East Slavic traditions).
- Pidnozhnyk: from pid (=under) and nohy (=feet)

== See also ==
=== Related references ===
- Rushnychok
- Song about the Towel

=== Embroidery in other cultures ===
- Balochi needlework
- Palestinian traditional costumes
