= Dnipro (magazine) =

Ukrainian literary magazine

Dnipro; Дніпро
- Editor: Mykola Lukiv
- Categories: Literature
- Frequency: monthly
- Circulation: 5500 copies
- First issue: 1927
- Company: Editorial board of the Dnipro magazine, TOV
- Country: Ukraine
- Based in: 38–44 Degtyarivska St., Kyiv
- Language: Ukrainian
- Website: dnipro-ukr.com.ua
- ISSN: 0130-321X

Dnipro (Ukrainian: «Дніпро», lit. 'Deep River' etymologically) is a monthly colour literary magazine in Ukraine. Published as Dnipro since 1944, it has its origins in the Molodniak magazine of 1927. The magazine features prose, contemporary poetry, modern Ukrainian drama, interviews, and reviews.

The magazine is known for publishing the works of repressed artists and artists in exile during the Soviet era. It also helped return a number of writers to Ukraine following the dissolution of the Soviet Union. In the mid-1990s, Dnipro's editors published a four-volume collection of Ukrainian literary works which was distributed to libraries and universities.

== History ==
The magazine was founded during the Soviet era. It began as Molodniak magazine (Молодняк; Young Generation) in 1927, founded by CC CLUYU (Ukrainian: ЦК ЛКСМУ; Lenin Communist Union of Youth of Ukraine) and published in Kharkiv, Ukraine SSR. It moved to Kyiv in 1935 and changed its name to Molodyi Bilshovyk (Молодий Більшовик; Young Bolsheviks) in 1937. In 1944, it received its current title Dnipro (Дніпро, English: Deep River).

In the 1960s, the magazine gained some notoriety for including literary works of Lina Kostenko, Ivan Drach, Borys Oliynyk, Ivan Svitlichny, Ivan Dziuba, Hryhir Tiutiunnyk, and Volodymyr Drosd – authors who suffered oppression and repression because of their beliefs yet remained faithful to their ideas.

Editors-in-chief of the magazine included P. Usenko, Andriy Malyshko, O. Pidsukha, D. Tkach, I. Statyvka, V. Brovchenko, V. Kolomiets, and three Heroes of Ukraine: Mykola Rudenko, Borys Oliynyk and Yuriy Mushketyk. The chief of the editorial board in 1984, Mykola Volodymyrovych Lukiv, became a well-known poet, lyricist, writer, and prizewinner of many Ukrainian and international literary awards.

In 1990, during the dissolution of the Soviet Union, the magazine was published with support from the Ukrainian Cultural Fund. In 1994, the magazine's editorial board published Ukainske Slovo, a four-volume collection of literature and critique that had appeared in the magazine. From 2009, a limited company was registered for its publication.

The magazine continues to position itself as a youth publication.

== Regular features ==
The magazine focuses on the tastes of contemporary readers, presenting material in the following forms:

- Prose – fantasy, mysticism, love stories, erotic, adventure materials, detective stories, and humour;
- Contemporary poetry – holding regular poetry contests to encourage new and surprising themes;
- Drama – modern Ukrainian plays, along with the articles that highlight the latest trends of the Ukrainian theatrical process; interviews with dramatists, producers and actors; articles dedicated to drama theory, genre classification, and reviews of the current theatrical festivals;
- Molodniak (Молодняк) – history of the formation of the periodical and broader literary heritage, historical events, and the lives of Ukrainian artists, poets and writers;
- Critical reviews – reviews of literary competitions, analytical articles on different subjects, topical outlines, analysis of one work of art published in the magazine;
- "Do VUS" – witty and apt Ukrainian synonyms;
- Nobelivka – creative work of world literature.

== Authors and works published ==
Dnipro provides a means for young writers to become known in literary circles, and for established writers to experiment in new themes. The periodical published the works of O. Iranets (critique of In Search of the Castaways), Borys Oliynyk, Oksana Zabuzhko (Off-site poem etc.), Max Kidruk (Class city narration), Moe pershe kuliove poranennia (My first bullet wound), Valeriy and Natalia Lapikury (detectives from the series Inspector i kava [Inspector and coffee]), Ihor Pavlyuk (Rezervatsiya [Reservation] novel), A. Kokotiukha critical article "Ukraina u poshukah detektyvu" (Ukraine in search of detectives), and fantasist Oleksiy Tymoshenko (Hudozhnyk [Artist] narration).

In their time it was Dnipro which published the poetry of Pavlo Tychyna, Maksym Rylsky, and Andriy Malyshko. It was the first periodical to issue the narrative "Molodist" (Youth) by O. Boychenko, the novel Narodzheni bureyu (Born of the Storm) by Nikolai Ostrovsky. Dnipro included the works of Volodymyr Sosiura, A. Golovko, Petro Panch, Mykola Bazhan, Vadim Sobko, Oles Donchenko and Vasil Zemliak. Oles Honchar, Yuri Zbanatskyi and Ivan Drach appeared on the pages of the magazine and the works of such artists as Mykola Vinhranovskiy, Yevhen Hutsalo, Borys Oliynyk and Vladimir Drozd were published.

Also, Ivan Sanchenko, Mykola Rudenko, Mykhailo Rudenko, Mykhailo Girnyk, Vasil Kucher, Vasil Zemliak, Mykola Nagnybida, K. Zhurba, Pavlo Zahrebelnyi, V. Tkachenko, V. Babliak, A. Horunzhyi, and A. Dimarov were among the authors of the magazine.

Dnipro printed the works of Ukrainian Soviet writers that were not published at the time of repression of the 20th–30th and stagnation at the end of the 60th – beginning of the 80th: narrative "Liubov and Kreshchatyk" (Love and Kreshchatyk) by Ivan Sanchenko, poetical tragicomedy "Zmova v Kyevi" (Plot in Kyiv) by Yevhen Pluzhnyk, play "Arkhitektor Shalko" (Architect Salko) by Yakiv Mamontov, the poetry of Volodymyr Sosiura, Vasil Mysyk, Borys Antonenko-Davydovych, Vasyl Stus, and diaries of Alexander Dovzhenko and Vasyl Symonenko.

The magazine published the novel Zhyva Voda (Live water) by Yuriy Yanovskyi, narrative "Zemlya gude" (Earth drones), essay "Charivnyk slova" (Magician of word) by Oles Honchar, movie-essay "Poema pro more" by Oleksandr Dovzhenko, novel "Volyn" by B. Harchuk, excerpts from the diary "Dumy moi, Dumy moi" by Ostap Vyshnia, outline "Molod’ ide vpered" (Youth steps forward) by Heliy Snegiriov, and the poetry of Lina Kostenko, Vasyl Symonenko, Borys Oliynyk, M. Klymenko, Vladimir Luchuk, Rostislav Bratun, etc.

Dnipro contains the investigations of Dmytro Yavornytsky about Ivan Sirko, articles by Symon Petliura, works "Vidrodzhennya natsii" (Renascence of Nation) by Volodymyr Vynnychenko, "Necropol’ Ukrainy" (Necropolis of Ukraine) and "Istoriya Rusiv" (History of the Rus) by Mikhail Kutynskyi, "Avtobiographiya" (Autobiography) by Mykola Kostomarov, etc., and works of the writers of the Ukrainian diaspora.

For the first time all literary works of Oleksandr Dovzhenko were published in Dnipro, and the author had been collaborating with the magazine until his last days. Dnipro printed the last novel of Mykhailo Stelmakh, Chotyry Brody (Four fords), which highlighted the events of Holodomor (1932–33).

Dnipro helped to return writers who were repressed and forgotten, who had been writing in Ukrainian outside of Ukraine: Olena Teliha, Ivan Bahrianyi (novels Sad Hetsymans'kyi [Hetman's garden], Tyhrolovy and Liudyna bizhyt’ nad prirvoyu [Human runs beyond the abyss]), Ulas Samchuk (novel Volyn, reminiscences Na bilomu koni [On the white horse]), Yevhen Malaniuk, Yuriy Klen, Leonid Mosendz, and Vasyl Barka and many others.

The magazine published a 4-volume reading book of 20th century Ukrainian literature and literary critique Ukrainske Slovo (Ukrainian Word) with the total printing of 600,000 copies sent to the libraries, schools and universities of Ukraine.

== Literary critique ==
The articles by Ivan Dziuba, V. Ivanysenko, Ivan Svitlichny appeared at the end of the 50th - in the 60th; they inspected the current literary process and the creative works of particular writers. An interesting discussion took place on the pages of the magazine between I. Dziuba, M. Stelmakh and I. Boychak about the creative work of Vasil Zemliak.

In the 1980s, Dnipro printed the articles of V. Fashchenko, Lada Fedorovska, Galyna Gordasevych, Vladimir Bazylevskyi, Vasil Yaremenko, M. Shalata, V. Chuiko, Petro Yakovenko etc. The magazine published the works "«Sobor» i navkolo niogo..." (The Cathedral and round it....), "Sprava Vasylia Zakharchenka" (Case of Vasyl’ Zakharchenko), "Davaite pogovorymo vidverto..." (Let's speak frankly...), and "Sprava V. Ivanysenko" (Case of V. Ivanysenko) by V. Koval. The magazine printed the article called "Phenomen doby" (Phenomenon of age) by Vasyl Stus, poems "Z taborovogo zoshyta" (From the exercise-book of camp), non-published works of Vasyl Symonenko, poem from the archives of KGB "Atomnyi tsvyntar" (Atom cemetery) by Mykola Rudenko.

== Illustrations ==
The magazine includes the illustrations and reproductions from the works of such painters as I. Ostafiychuck, Ivan Marchuk, Andrey Antoniuk, M. Dakhna, and Vasyl Lopata.

In 2010, the magazine became fully coloured and illustrated; it opened new perspectives and possibilities for the presentation of fiction texts to the readers, being focused on the tastes of the contemporary reader.

== Awards and competitions ==
Many works first published in the magazine were later honoured with the Lenin Prize, such as "Poema pro more" (Poem about see) by O. Dovzhenko). Published works also received the USSR state Shevchenko National Prize: novel "Chotyry brody" (Four fords) by V. Stelmakh, "ambilogy Lebedyna zgraya" (Swan bevy) and "Zeleni mlyny" (Green mills) by Vasil Zemliak).

The magazine was awarded by the Order of the Badge of Honour in 1977.

The Malyshko Award was established by the secretariat of CC LCUYU in 1982, and was awarded to Dnipro in recognition of the best works highlighting the present civil subjects that were published in the magazine.

== See also ==
- List of magazines in Ukraine

== Literature ==
- Molodyi Bilshovyk – Kyiv: Encyclopedic reference / Edited by A.V. Kudrytskyi. – Kyiv: Central editorial board of Ukrainian Soviet Encyclopedia, 1981. – 736 p., il.
- Dnipro – Kyiv: Encyclopedic reference / Edited by A.V. Kudrytskyi. - Kyiv: Central editorial board of Ukrainian Soviet Encyclopedia, 1981. – 736 p., il.
- Molodyi Bilshovyk – Ukrainian Soviet Encyclopedia. In 12 volumes. / Edited by Mykola Bazhan. – 2nd ed. – К., 1974–1985.
- Dnipro – Ukrainian Soviet Encyclopedia. In 12 volumes. / Edited by М. Bazhan. – 2nd ed. – К., 1974–1985.
- Dnipro – Dictionary/reference book of the history of modern literature edited by R.T. Gromyak, Yu. I. Kovaliova, V.I. Teremko – К.: EC "Akademiya" 2007
- "Ukrainske slovo": Reading book of the Ukrainian literature and literary critique of 20th century in 3 volumes – К.: Ros’, 1994. (Libr. of "Dnipro" mag., – ISBN 5-7707-8803-8 Book 1 /Edited by V. Yaremenko, E. Fedorenko. – 1994 – 703 p.
- "Ukrainske slovo": Reading book of the Ukrainian literature and literary critique of 20th century in 3 volumes – К.: Ros’, 1994. (Libr. of "Dnipro" mag., – ISBN 5-7707-8803-8 Book 2 /Edited by V. Yaremenko, E. Fedorenko. – 1994 – 719 p.
- "Ukrainske slovo": Reading book of the Ukrainian literature and literary critique of 20th century in 3 volumes – К.: Ros’, 1994. (Libr. of "Dnipro" mag., – ISBN 5-7707-8803-8 Book 3 /Edited by V. Yaremenko, E. Fedorenko. – 1994 – 703 p.
