= Kateryna Buzhynska =

Ukrainian singer (born 1979)

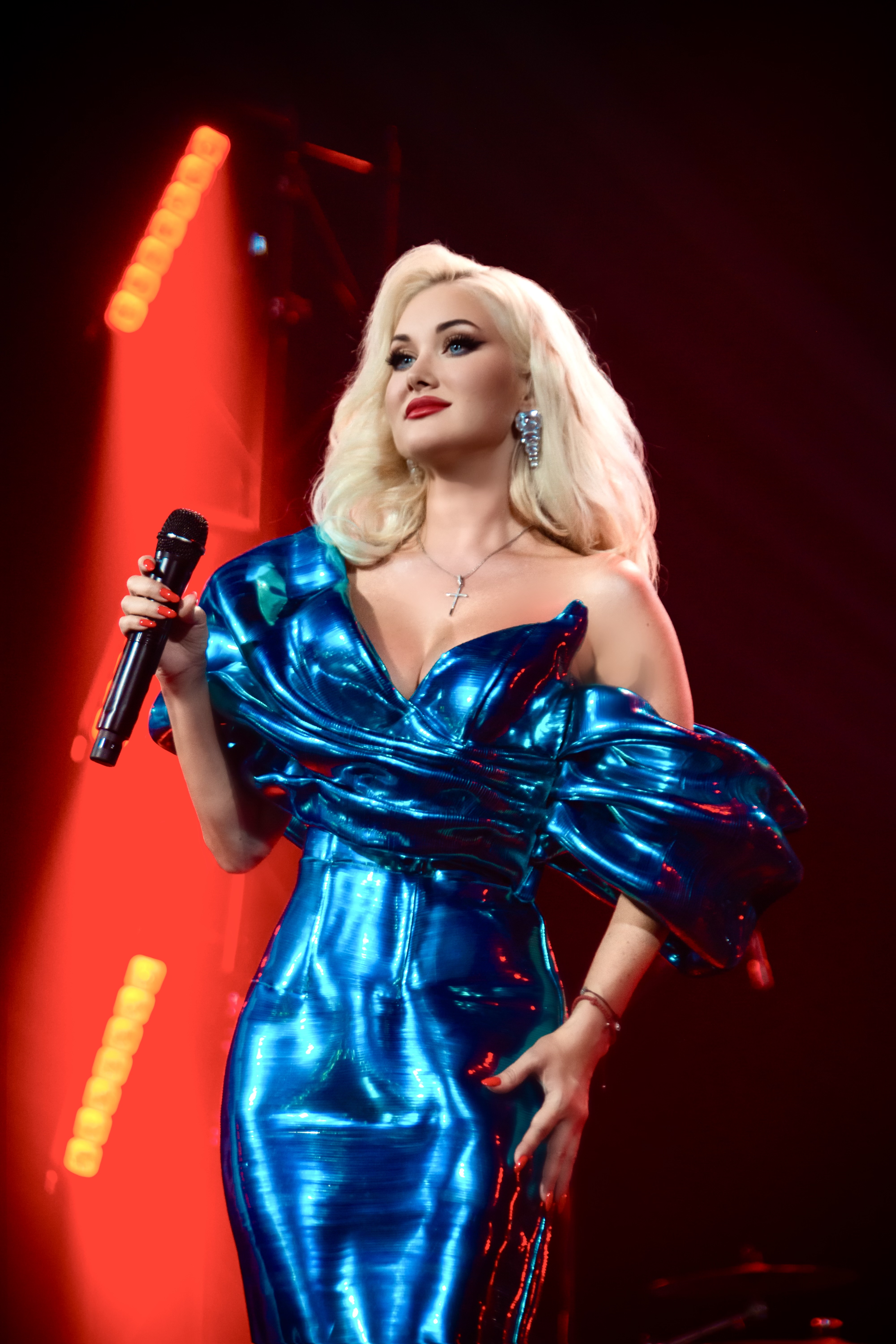
- Buzhynska 2025
- Born: 13 August 1979 (age 47); Norilsk, Russian SFSR, Soviet Union
- Occupations: singer; actor
- Musical career
- Genres: Pop
- Instrument: Vocals

Kateryna Volodymyrivna Buzhynska (Ukrainian: Катерина Володимирівна Бужинська; born 13 August 1979) is a Ukrainian singer. Possessing a mezzo-soprano range, she is a laureate of numerous song contests and a People's Artist of Ukraine. She sings in Ukrainian, Russian, English, Italian, Spanish, Hebrew and Bulgarian.

== Life and career ==
=== Early life ===
Buzhynska was born as Kateryna Volodymyrivna Yashchuk on 13 August 1979 in Norilsk, where she lived for three years. Later, the family moved to Chernivtsi, her mother's home town. When she began her career, she performed under her father's surname Yashchuk; later, she took her mother's surname, Buzhynska.

The successes of Yashchuk at the start of her career were connected with the children's ensemble "Ringing Voices" at the Palace of Pioneers in Chernivtsi and teacher Maria Kogos, who studied with another well-known pop singer Ani Lorak. Yashchuk has also worked at the Chernivtsi Philharmonic. In 1994, Buzhynska became a finalist in the Channel One Russia program "Morning Star". After finishing the 9th grade of Serednia School No. 33, in 1993, she attended Chernivtsi Art School. In 1995, Buzhynska became the winner of the prestigious Ukrainian song contests "Divograi", "Primrose", "Colorful Dreams", and "Chervona Ruta".

=== 1996–1999: Early career ===
In 1996, Buzhynska took part in the "Veselad" festival and won the first Grand Prix. In the same year, at the invitation of her producer Yuriy Kvelenkov, she went to Kyiv, where, after passing the exams, she entered the second year of the Kyiv Institute of Music at "Pop Vocals" department, where she studied vocals with Tetyana Rusova.

In 1997, Buzhynska received the Grand Prix at the "Young Halychyna" and "Through Thorns to the Stars" festivals, and the first prize at the "Song Vernissage". In 1997, her success was evaluated in the program "Hit of the Year" in the nomination "Opening of the Year". In 1998, she received the Grand Prix at the international festival "Slavyansky Bazar-98" for the performance of the song "Doomed" based on the poems of Yuriy Rybchynskyi and music by Serge Lama.

Buzhynska continued to cooperate with Rybchynskyi and the composer Oleksandr Zlotnyk even after the victory at the "Slavic Bazaar". The songs and music they created became hits such as "Ice", "Romansero", "Nepokirna", and video maker Nataliya Shevchuk made a video for them. In 1998, Buzhynska became the winner of the "Prometheus-prestige" award in the "Young Talent" category in the "Person of the Year" category. In 1998, she released her debut studio album entitled Музыка, которую я люблю ("Music I Love"). In 1999, she received the Grand Prix for participation in the "Malva" festival in Biała Podlaska, Poland. In the same year, she released her second album Лёд ("Ice"). A clip was shot for the same song, in which Ukrainian figure skaters Yulia Obertas and Dmytro Palamarchuk took part.

=== 2000–2008 ===
In 2000, Buzhynska successfully graduated from the Kyiv Institute of Music, receiving a bachelor's degree. In 2001, Buzhynska became the first representative of Ukraine at the Sanremo Music Festival, where she performed the song "Ukraine". In cooperation with the NAK studio, the album "Flame" was released in the same year. In 2001, Nataliya Shevchuk shot a music video for the song "Romansero" from the next album. The clip was filmed at the Pirogovo Museum of Ethnography in Kyiv, but the entourage was chosen for Spanish and Gypsy culture. The text about crazy love and betrayal was written by Rybchinskyi. President Leonid Kuchma awarded Buzhynska the title of Merited Artist of Ukraine.

The second music video on a historical theme for the song to the words of Rybchinskyi "Genghis Khan" was directed by Bakhodyr Yuldashev. The singer's producer had the idea of creating an artistic work involving actors a few years before filming, but Yuldashev was able to implement it in 2002 based on his script on the basis of the Tashkent film studio "Uzbekfilm", whose actors also took part in mass productions and staged fights. Uzbek actor Javakhir Zakirov played the khan, and Kateryna Buzhynska played his captive, later his wife, who at the end of the clip kills the khan.

In 2003, Buzhynska released the album "Romansero". After finishing work on the album "Beloved of the name" in 2006, she goes on maternity leave. In 2008, Buzhynska was presented with a star on the avenue of stars in Chernivtsi.

=== 2009–2013 ===
In May 2009, Buzhynska was awarded the Order of St. Stanislaus. In October 2009, she received the "Woman of the Third Millennium" award.

In 2011, Buzhynska, together with Volodymyr Kuzin, won the final of the television show "Narodna Zirka-4" on the Ukraine channel and held a solo concert "Queen of Inspiration". In 2012, Oleksandr Filatovych shot a music video for the song "Prymarilos", the music for which was written by Viktor Chaika, and the poems by Viktor Ionov; it was previously performed by Irina Allegrova in 2007. In May 2013, she received the music award "Best Ukrainian Duet of the Year" in the nomination "Pride of Ukrainian Song" for the performance of the song "Two Stars" in a duet with P. Chorny.

=== 2014–present ===
In June 2014, Buzhynska released her eighth studio album, Nezhny, rodnoi (Tender, Dear), named in reference to her husband. One of the songs in this album "Україна-це ми!" (Ukraine is us!) received the "Hit of the Year" award.

== Personal life ==
Buzhynska married Dimitar Stoychev in April 2014. She has three children, Olena and twins, Dmytro and Kateryna, born 27 December 2016.

== Discography ==
- 1998 — Muzyka, kotoruiu ja liubliu (Музыка, которую я люблю)
- 1999 — Liod (Лёд)
- 2001 — Plamaia (Пламя)
- 2003 — Romansevo (Романсеро)
- 2005 — Liubimoi nazovi (Любимой назови)
- 2011 — Koroleva vdokhnovenia (Королева вдохновения)
- 2012 — Jak u nas na Ukraini (Як у нас на Україні)
- 2014 — Nezhny, rodnoi (Нежный, родной)
