= Yuriy Mushketyk =

Ukrainian writer and journalist (1929–2019)

Hero of Ukraine Yuriy Mushketyk
- Юрій Мушкетик
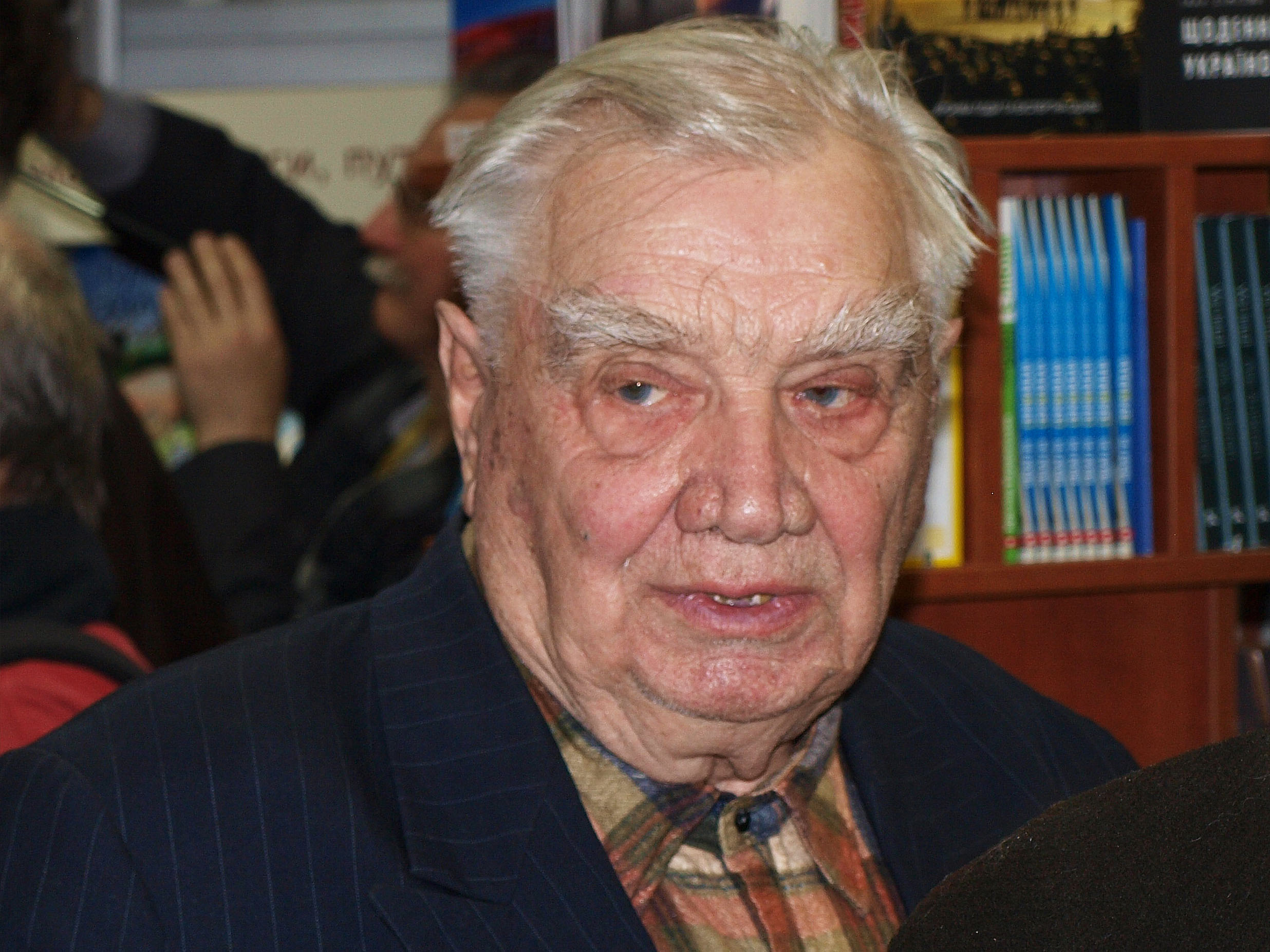
- Mushketyk in 2015
- Born: 21 March 1929; Vertiivka, Nizhyn Raion, Ukrainian SSR, Soviet Union
- Died: 6 June 2019 (aged 90); Kyiv, Ukraine
- Resting place: Baikove Cemetery
- Education: Taras Shevchenko National University of Kyiv
- Occupations: Writer; journalist
- Spouse: Lina Serhiivna
- Children: 2
- Awards: Hero of Ukraine; Shevchenko National Prize

Yuriy Mykhaylovych Mushketyk (Ukrainian: Юрій Михайлович Мушкетик; 21 March 1929 – 6 June 2019) was a Ukrainian novelist and journalist who earned the title of Hero of Ukraine in 2009. In his thirty years of writing, he created multiple plays, several novels, and collections of short stories in addition to publishing over 10 books.

== Early life and education ==
Born on 21 March 1929, in the Ukrainian village of Vertiivka. Mushketyk completed the typical rural school curriculum from childhood. The war cruelly severed this connection, just like it did with his peers. A number of military books would draw on the author's personal experiences of those turbulent times, which subsequently served as the inspiration for the novella Lights in the Night (1959). After graduating from Shevchenko University's Faculty of Philology in 1953, he pursues three more years of postgraduate work at the Department of Ukrainian Literature.

== Career ==
In 1954, Mushketyk made his literary debut with the publication of his first piece, a story titled Semen Paliy. That same year, he joined the Union of Writers of the USSR. He began working as the head editor of the magazine Dnipro from 1956 to 1972 and eventually rose to the position of editor-in-chief over his 20 years there.

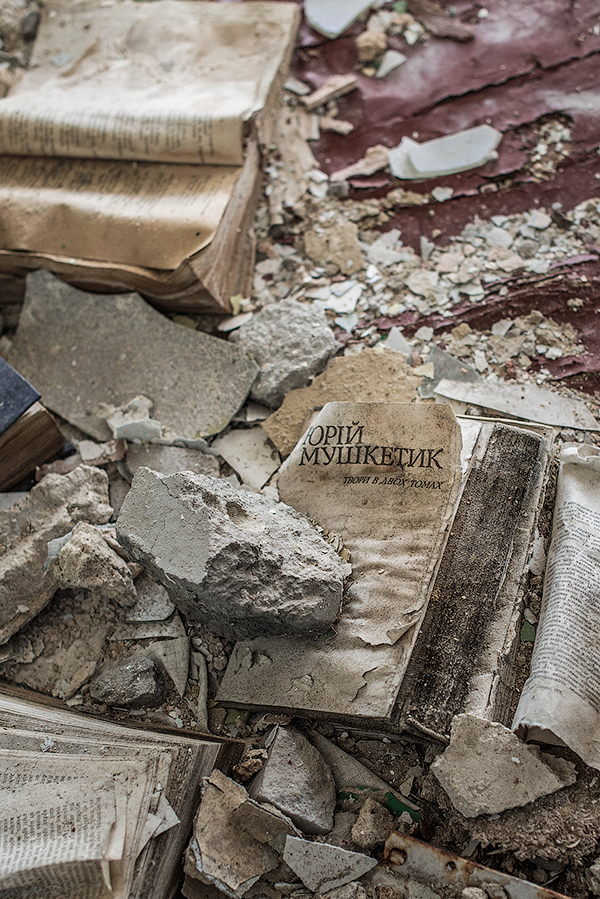
A destroyed book of Mushketyk during the war in Donbas, 2017

In his writings, Mushketyk does more than just recount the actual events; he also crafts stories centered around universal issues and internal struggles, which are essential to human existence. Specifically, the pieces Black Bread (1960) and Fires in the Middle of the Night (1959) depict the pre-war and Nazi occupation of Ukraine. His works Heart and Stone (1962) and Drop of Blood (1964) effectively depict human situations, raising serious moral issues when lofty ideals expressed in words do not match reality. Other notable novels written by him includes The Last Island (1969), Green Rye (1965), and the tale The Day Flies Over Us (1967).

Through his works White Shadow (1977), Pain (1978), Position (1979), and Rubezh (1984), he attained depth on a psychological and philosophical level by bringing up the real, universal, timeless issue of humanity and the planet. Novels and stories from the 1970s and 1980s marked a new phase in his development: Cruel Mercy (1973), Death of Socrates, The Court of Seneca (1978), Return to Your Home (1981), Vikhola (1982), The Collapse, Yellow Flower of the Dandelion and The Tear of Ophelia (1985). The pages of Yasa (1987) are devoted to the notion of unifying the Ukrainian people and the valiant battle of the masses against foreign invaders; in 1990, Borys Shylenko developed the screenplay and directed the film Black Valley, which was based on the novel.

Mushketyk released a historical fiction book titled On Brother Brother (1996), about Hetman Ivan Vyhovsky attempting to establish a Ukrainian Cossack state following the passing of the Hetman Bohdan Khmelnytsky, and he concentrated on finding a counterbalance to the expanding Moscow armies during this period, which he recreated in his work. The protagonists of his works are well-known figures from Ukrainian history, including Ivan Mazepa, Maksym Zalizniak, Ivan Sirko, Petro Doroshenko and Pavlo Polubotok. Their actions take place against the backdrop of a trustworthy, multifaceted picture of Ukrainian life, drawing on an enormous amount of historical sources as well as theoretical and historical studies that he has studied.

In 1989, Mushketyk was later elected as the first secretary of the board of the Kyiv organization of the Union of Writers of Ukrainian SSR. He was the chairman of the Union of Writers of Ukrainian SSR Council from 1989; actively participated in the fight for the resuscitation of the Ukrainian language and culture. In 1995, the Ukrainian Academy of Original Ideas made him an academician, and a people's deputy in the 11th session of the Ukrainian Verkhovna Rada.

On 6 June 219, Mushketyk died at the age of 90. The Ukrainian Cabinet of Ministers bid him farewell and was buried at Baikove Cemetery.

== Political positions ==
Mushketyk viewed that historical occurrences repeat themselves because Russia has pushed to keep Ukraine from becoming independent in the past and continues to do so now. Even though Tsar Alexei Mikhailovich wanted to believe that Ukrainians would one day leave and found their own nation, it has been going on since then. The fact that the Ukrainian people have persevered for so many centuries serves as another evidence of their capacity for battle.

== Personal life ==
Mushketyk's mother led the communal farm for a while, while his father was employed as an educator. He was married to Lina Serhiivna, and together have two daughters, the eldest being Lesya, a folklorist and leading researcher at the Rylsky Institute of Art Studies, Folklore and Ethnology. His youngest daughter Oksana is a Ukrainian Academy of Printing graduate. His wife died in February 2008.

== Awards and recognitions ==
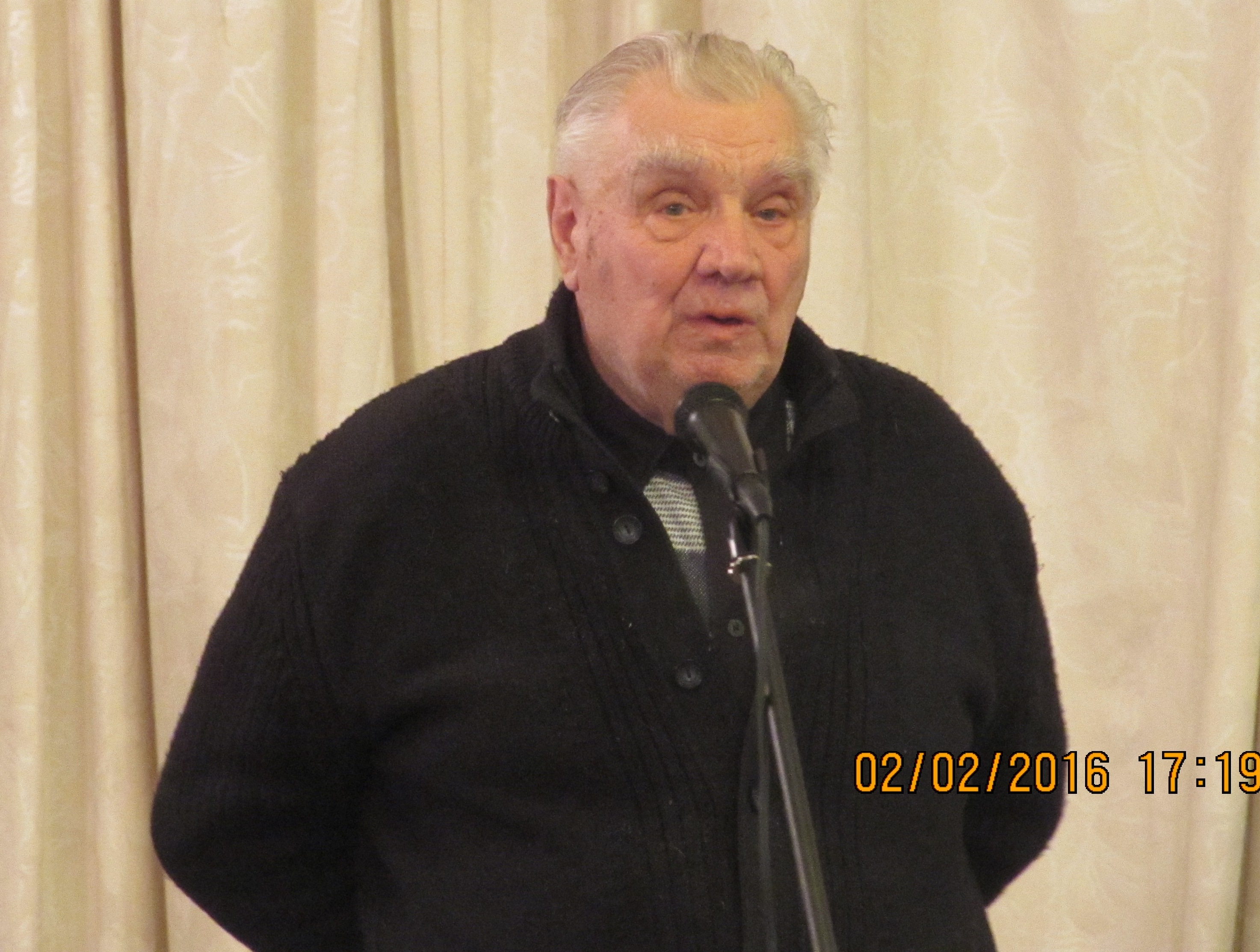
Mushketyk in 2016

Mushketyk has received other awards and recognitions such as:

- Hero of Ukraine Order of the State (20 March 2009)
- Alexander Dovzhenko Medal (2018)
- Ivan Mazepa Medal (18 March 2016)
- Golden Writer of Ukraine (2012)
- Antonovych Prize (1996)
- State Prize of the USSR (1987)
- Shevchenko National Prize (1980)
- Mykola Ostrovsky Prize (1965)
