= D-Drifters-5 =

Ukrainian rock band from Manitoba, Canada

The D-Drifters-5 (also called the D Drifters 5, the D-Drifters 5, or simply the D Drifters, D-Drifters, or Ddrifters) were a Ukrainian Canadian rock ensemble from Winnipeg that was active in the 1960s, but also in later decades. Some of their music included Ukrainian language cover songs of English language rock songs of groups such as the Beatles. Their music influenced the Ukrainian Canadian band Rushnychok.

== Band members ==
- Mike Klym - drums
- Tony Romanyshyn (1945-2012) - guitar
- Yogi Klos (1944-2013) - violin
- Dave Romanyshyn (Roman) (1944-2022) - accordion/cordovox
- Andy Poloniski

== Discography ==
They released eight albums, including the 1964 Ukrainian Country Music, the 1964 On Tour, the 1965 D-Drifters 5 Sing and Play at a Ukrainian Concert, 1965 D-Drifters-5 Play Ukrainian Dance Favorites, the 1965 The D-Drifters-5 Sing And Play Beatles Songs And Other Top English Hits In Ukrainian, the 1973 D-Drifters Polka 'N' Fun, the D-Drifters Southbound, and the 2002 Ddrifters Celebration.

== See also ==
- Ukrainian folk music
- Ukrainian Canadians
