= Anatoliy Mokrenko =

Ukrainian operatic baritone (1933–2020)

- Анатолій Мокренко
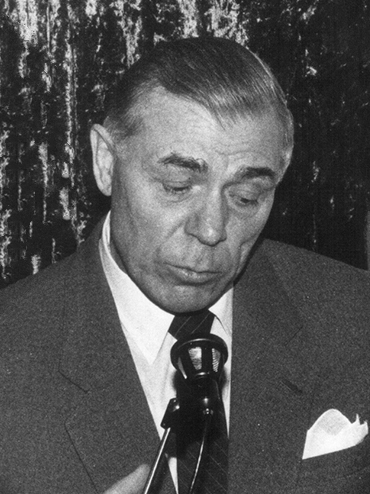
- Born: Anatoliy Yuriyovych Mokrenko; Анатолій Юрійович Мокренко; 22 January 1933; Sumy, Ukrainian SSR, Soviet Union
- Died: 24 March 2020 (aged 87); Kyiv, Ukraine
- Education: Conservatorium Maastricht
- Occupations: Operatic baritone; Opera manager; Academic teacher
- Organizations: National Opera of Ukraine; Petro Tchaikovsky National Music Academy of Ukraine
- Awards: Shevchenko National Prize

Anatoliy Yuriyovych Mokrenko (Ukrainian: Анатолій Юрійович Мокренко; 22 January 1933 – 24 March 2020) was a Ukrainian operatic baritone who appeared internationally. He was also the director of the National Opera of Ukraine and a professor at the Petro Tchaikovsky National Music Academy of Ukraine.

== Life and career ==
Born Anatoliy Yuriyovych Mokrenko in a village near Terni in the Sumy district, he studied at the Kyiv Polytechnic Institute to become an engineering geologist, graduating in 1956. He worked for eight years in the Caucasus, in Northern Urals, Crimea, the Carpathians and in South Ukraine. He studied voice simultaneously at the Kyiv State Conservatory with Nikolai Zubarev and Alexandra Grodzinska, graduating in 1963.

He was a soloist of the National Opera of Ukraine from 1968 to 1996, also touring internationally. He performed around 40 leading roles and made recordings, also for radio and television. He took part in the 1975 world premiere of Heorhiy Maiboroda's Yaroslav Mudriy, which was recorded in 1982. In 1978, he was the baritone soloist in a recording of Prokofiev's music for Ivan the Terrible, with Irina Arkhipova (mezzo-soprano), speaker Boris Morgunov, the Ambrosian Chorus and the Philharmonia Orchestra, conducted by Riccardo Muti. He played as an actor in several films, such as Lucia di Lammermoor, a 1980 Russian movie based on Donizetti's opera from the Kyiv opera house conducted by O. Ryabov.

He was the general director and artistic director of the National Opera of Ukraine from 1991 to 1999. In 1992, he took the company to Paris to present two operas, as part of a five-months "showcase of the performing arts" from Ukraine. Mussorgsky's Khovanshchina and Tchaikovsky's Mazeppa were played at the Palais des congrès. Mussorgsky's work was sung in Russian in a 1963 production. Mazeppa, about a Ukrainian hero, was sung in Ukrainian in a 1991 production by Dmytro Hnatyuk. Mokrenko planned to focus more on Ukrainian operas, playing four of them each season, and encouraging the composition of new ones. In 1995, the National Ballet appeared at the Spoleto Festival and toured in Europe, Japan, China, and Singapore, performing Tchaikovsky's Swan Lake and the new Lisova Pisnia, with Anatoliy Chikeero as ballet master. The National Opera played Anton Rudnytsky's Anna Yaroslavna on a libretto by Leonid Poltava, at home and in France.

Mokrenko was a professor at the Petro Tchaikovsky National Music Academy of Ukraine. He initiated an annual children's choir competition in Terni, "Sing along", serving as its chairman and juror.

Mokrenko died on 24 March 2020.

== Awards ==
He was named a People's Artist of the USSR in 1976 and received the Shevchenko National Prize in 1978. Among his awards were also the Order of Friendship of Peoples, and of Yaroslav the Wise, and of Vladimir the Great.
