= Yaroslav Mudriy =

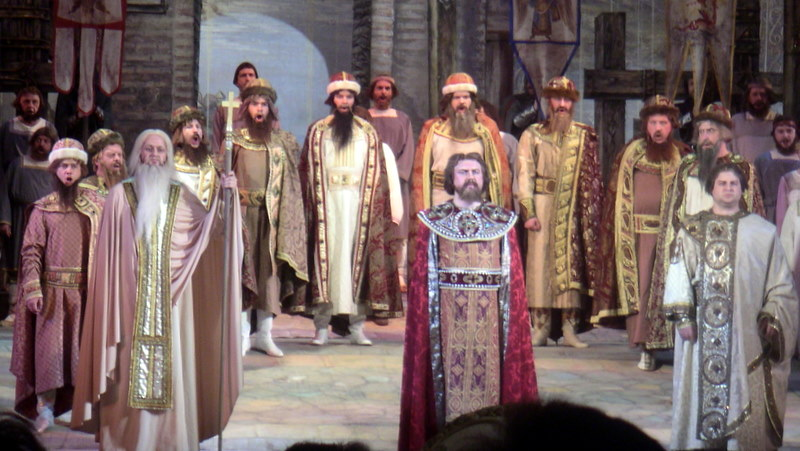
Yaroslav (Sergiy Magera, centre) is threatened by a horde of second-rate false beards in act 3 of Yaroslav Mudriy (Kiev Opera House production)

Yaroslav Mudriy (English: Yaroslav the Wise) is an opera in eight scenes, comprised in three acts, by the Ukrainian composer Heorhiy Maiboroda, written in 1973 and premiered in 1975. The composer himself adapted the libretto from a dramatic poem by Ivan Kocherga.

Conceived on a grand scale, and written in a straightforward diatonic style, the opera evokes comparisons (not entirely in its favour) to Mussorgsky's Boris Godunov and (especially in its last two scenes) Prokofiev's Alexander Nevsky.

== Roles ==
Role	Voice type	Premiere cast, Kiev Opera House, 1975 (Conductor: Stefan Turchak)
Yaroslav the Wise, Prince of Kiev	bass	Oleksandr Zgurovskiy
Ingigerda, his wife	soprano	Gisela Tsipola
Elizaveta, their daughter	soprano	Nadiya Kudelya
Anna, their daughter	mezzo-soprano	
Harald, a Norwegian noble	baritone	Anatoliy Mokryenko
Mykyta, a scribe	tenor	
Djemma, a Sicilian girl	mezzo-soprano	Galyna Tuftina
Zhureyko, a stonemason	tenor	Andriy Ishchenko
Mylusha, his wife	soprano	
Silvestr, head scribe	bass	Anatoliy Kocherga
Citizens of Kiev and Novgorod, nobles, Vikings, etc.

== Synopsis ==
11th century Kiev. Yaroslav is Great Prince of the Kievan Rus', married to the Swedish princess Ingigerda. The episodic plot of the opera - which contains a number of perplexing coincidences and bewildering changes of character by the leading roles, and scarcely testifies overall to the hero's wisdom - deals with Yaroslav's attempts to govern despite the destabilising influences of the town of Novgorod, the Viking Varangians, and the invading Pechenegs. Many of the characters are actual historical personages.

=== Act I ===
==== Scene 1 ====
The palace. The scribe Sylvestr supervises his pupils, including Mykyta who is in fact the son of Kosnyatyn, the governor of Novgorod, imprisoned by Yaroslav. Both Mykyta and the visiting Harald of Norway are struck by the beauty of Yaroslav's daughter, Elizaveta; Mykyta sets aside his intention of assassinating Yaroslav.

==== Scene 2 ====
Harald declares his love for Elizaveta, but Yaroslav says he must first win himself a kingdom. Zhureyko complains to Yaroslav that a Viking, Turvald, has attempted to rape his wife Mylusha and has murdered her brother. When Elizaveta pleads for clemency, Yaroslav remits the death sentence for a fine. Turvald however, continues to menace Mylusha – Zhureyko kills him and flees.

=== Act II ===
==== Scene 3 ====
Yaroslav broods over his problems. Enter Ingigerda, who pleads for another Viking, Ulf, whom Yaroslav wishes to exile. They argue, Ingigerda accusing him of being low-born. A noble enters to tell Yaroslav of the intended rebellion of Novgorod, and Yaroslav orders the death of Kosnyatin.

==== Scene 4 ====
Harald returns, having become King of Norway. He is espoused to Elizaveta to the jubilation of the population.

==== Scene 5 ====
Messengers from Novgorod tell Mykyta, who is musing over his loss of Elizaveta, of the death of his father. Djemma, a girl from Harald's retinue, declares her love for Mykyta, who vainly fobs her off, claiming he is a monk. He determines to take revenge on Yaroslav (but in fact does nothing). Zhureyko returns to Kiev in secret and happens to overhear Ingigerda plotting with Ulf to murder Yaroslav. He sends Mylusha to warn the prince, but she is captured and murdered by Ulf's henchmen. Zhureyko escapes them and denounces Ulf and Ingigerda, who is sent to a nunnery.

=== Act III ===
==== Scene 6 ====
Some years later. Mykyta and Djemma return from Norway (it is not explained what they were doing there) with news of the death of Elizaveta. The nobleman Myroslav then tells the distraught Prince Yaroslav that the Pechenegs are invading. Enter Zhureyko, who has somehow got early wind of this news and has been on his own initiative to Novgorod to get support against this new joint enemy. Mykyta makes a sarcastic comment that Yaroslav always has to rely on the Novgorodians whom he so maltreats; Yaroslav moves to strike him but is dumbfounded when Djemma reveals that he is Kosnyatyn's son.

==== Scene 7 ====
The battle against the Pechenegs is graphically described in a lively intermezzo for orchestra.

==== Scene 8 ====
Yaroslav has been triumphant, although Mykyta has died defending Kiev. The people praise their wise ruler.

== Recordings ==
- 1982; Stépan Tourtchak: Kievan State Academic Theater of Opera and Ballet Chorus and Orchestra; LP Melodiya C10 17729-34
