= Song about the Rushnyk =

1958 song about a rushnyk (familial embroidered cloth)

"Пісня про рушник"

Song by: Oleksandr Taranets; Dmytro Yaremchuk; Dmytro Hnatyuk; Kvitka Cisyk
- Language: Ukrainian
- English title: "Song about the Towel (Rushnyk)"
- Written: Andriy Malyshko
- Released: 1958
- Genre: lyrics
- Composer: Platon Maiboroda
- Lyricist: Andriy Malyshko

"Song about the rushnyk" (embroidered ritual cloth, Ukrainian: «Пісня про рушник», romanized: Pisnia pro rushnyk), also known as Rushnychok, Ballad to Mother, or "My dear mother" (Ukrainian: «Рідна мати моя», romanized: Ridna maty moya), is a popular Ukrainian song based on a poem by Andriy Malyshko. The poem and song recount a lyrical hero whose mother gives him a rushnyk, an embroidered cloth serving as a sort of familial talisman through one's life cycle, draped over religious icons and ritual foods, and also used for handfasting or as a prosperity blessing at weddings.

It was set to music by composer Platon Maiboroda (a native of the Poltava Region) for the soundtrack of the 1958 Soviet film Young Years (Ukrainian: Літа молодії) where it was performed by Oleksandr Taranets. The song was later popularized by Dmytro Hnatyuk, who is most often associated with this song. It has since been sung by such singers and groups as Kvitka Cisyk, Yaroslav Evdokimov, Aleksandr Malinin, Alla Pugacheva, Igor Krutoy, Syabry, Renata Babak, and Rushnychok. It is dedicated to motherly love and alternately titled "Ballad to Mother."

The song has been translated into a number of languages and is popular within Ukraine as well as the Ukrainian diaspora, as demonstrated by the Ukrainian-Canadian group Rushnychok taking its name from the song. An English translation of the song was done by Thomas Botting and was published in the magazine Soviet Life.
