= Heorhiy Maiboroda =

Ukrainian composer

People's Artist Heorhiy Maiboroda
- Георгій Майборода
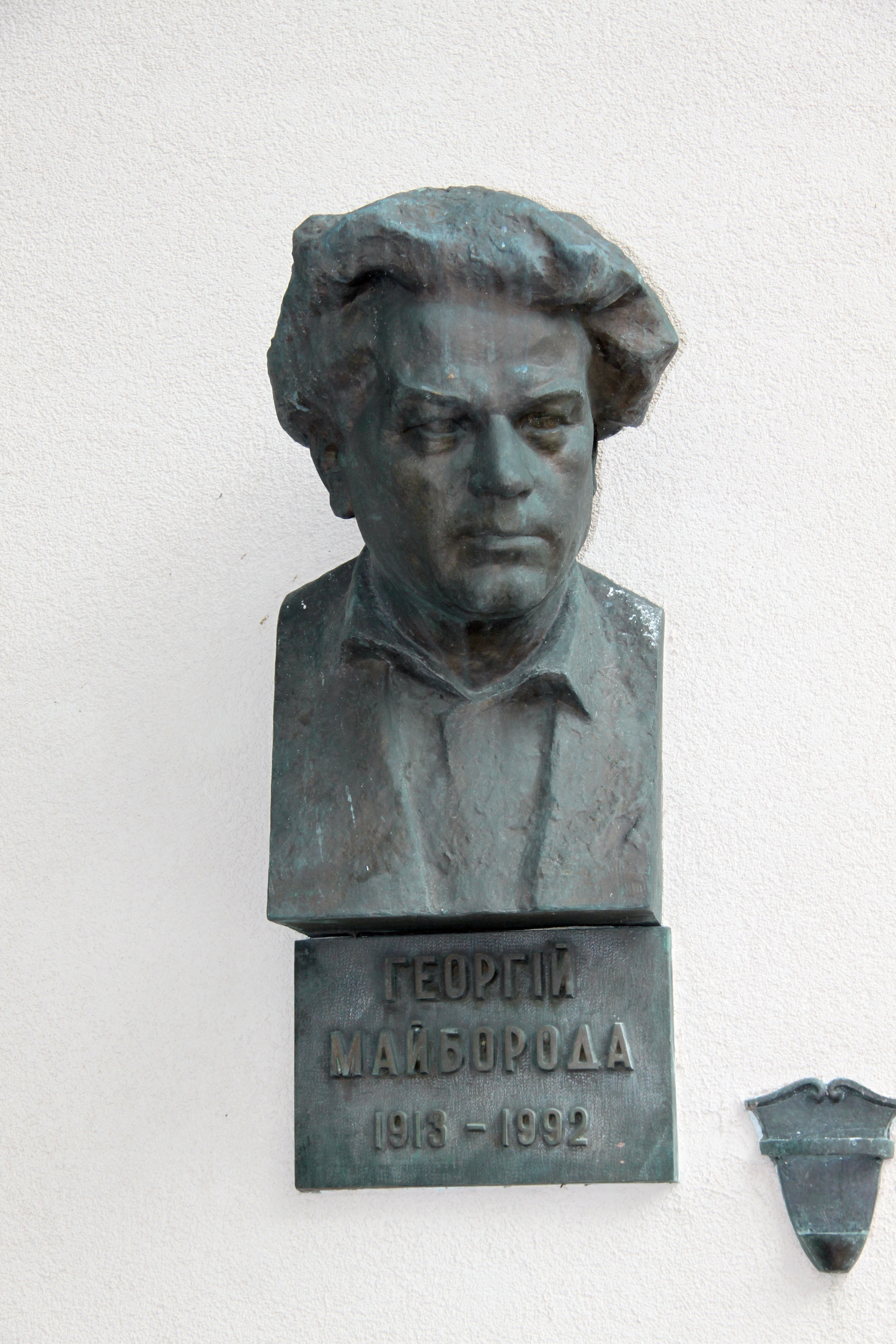
- Born: 1 December [O.S. 18 November] 1913; Pelekhivshchyna, Russian Empire
- Died: 6 December 1992 (aged 79); Kyiv, Ukraine
- Occupation: Composer
- Awards: Order of Lenin; Shevchenko National Prize

Heorhiy Ilarionovych Maiboroda (Note: Ukrainian: Георгій Іларіонович Майборода, romanized: Heorhii Ilarionovych Maiboroda, sometimes given as Georgiy Mayboroda) (1 December [O.S. 18 November] 1913 – 6 December 1992) was a Soviet and Ukrainian composer. People's Artist of the USSR (1960).

Maiboroda, whose brother Platon Maiboroda was also a composer (mainly of songs), studied at the Glière College of Music in Kyiv, where he studied under Levko Revutsky, graduating in 1941 and teaching there from 1952 to 1958. From 1967 to 1968 he was head of the Composers Union of Ukraine.

His musical career was based in Ukraine, and he set several operas to Ukrainian librettos, including Yaroslav the Wise (1973, published 1975), Arsenal (published 1961), Mylana (published 1960), and Taras Shevchenko (1964, published 1968; based on the life of the Ukrainian artist and poet of that name), all of which were produced at the Kyiv Opera House. He also prepared a performing edition of Semen Hulak-Artemovsky's opera, Zaporozhets za Dunayem.

Amongst other works, Maiboroda wrote a suite of incidental music to Shakespeare's King Lear, four symphonies, two piano concertos and a violin concerto, as well as numerous songs and romances.

In 1963 he was awarded a Shevchenko National Prize for his work by the Ukrainian SSR.
