= Andriy Malyshko =

Soviet-Ukrainian poet

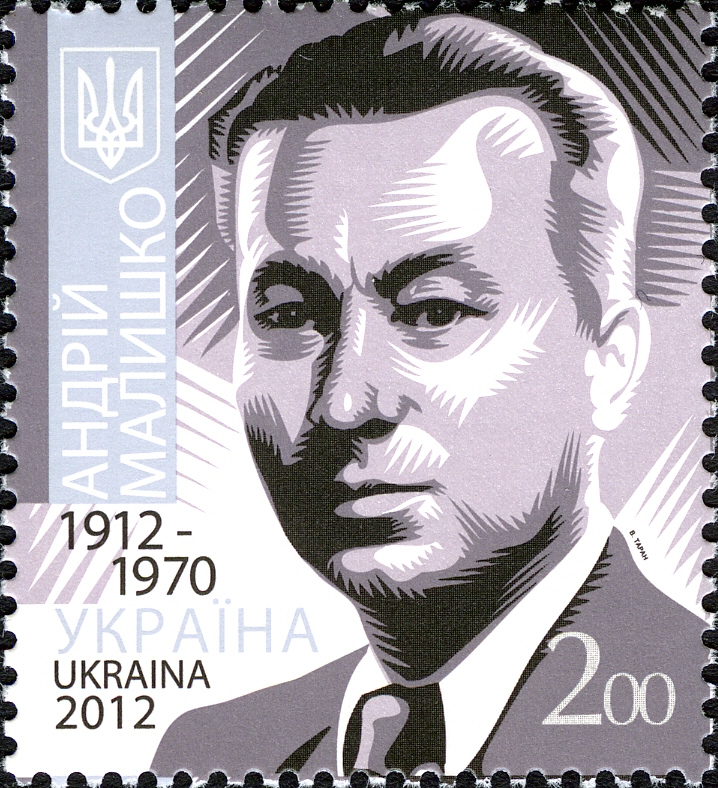
- Malyshko on a 2012 postage stamp
- Born: Andriy Samiylovych Malyshko; November 14, 1912; Obukhiv, Kiev Governorate, Russian Empire
- Died: February 17, 1970 (aged 57); Kiev, Ukrainian SSR, Soviet Union
- Occupations: Poet, translator, singer
- Writing career
- Notable awards: Shevchenko National Prize (1964)

Signature
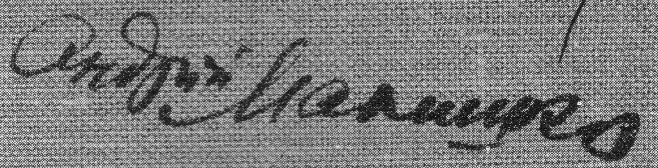

Andriy Samiylovych Malyshko (Ukrainian: Андрій Самійлович Малишко; 14 November [O.S. 1 November] 1912, Obukhiv – 17 February 1970, Kyiv) was a Soviet Ukrainian poet and translator. Many of his poems were made into songs.

== Biography ==
Malyshko was born on 2 (15) November 1912 in Obukhiv, now a city in Kyiv Oblast of Ukraine into a shoemaker's family. After graduating from the Kyiv Institute of Popular Education in 1932, he worked as a teacher and wrote articles for a number of Soviet Ukrainian newspapers. During the German-Soviet War Malyshko served as a war correspondent. In 1944 he was appointed editor of Dnipro magazine. Later in his career Malyshko served as member of the Supreme Soviet of the Ukrainian Soviet Socialist Republic (from 3rd to 6th convocation). He died in 1970 in Kyiv.

== Literary work ==
Malyshko started publishing his works in 1930. His early poems were dedicated to typical issues of the time and included the themes of civil war, reconstruction of national economy, socialism, collective labour, working man, Ukrainian history etc. However, already then Malyshko's works were characterized with deep lyricism, emotionality, presence of folklore motives and popular beliefs, feelings of beauty in relation not only to nature, but to also to the human soul. His wartime poetry can be seen as a sort of a diary showing fates and expressing feelings of different people in extraordinary circumstances.

After the war Malyshko published several collections of ideologically loaded romantic poetry. During this time he dedicated many of his poems to peasant life, which was depicted in an optimistic tone very different from the reality on the ground. Starting from the late 1950s the author could finally rid his creativity of superficial generalizations and excess pathos, producing new works with original content and masterful use of verse. Malyshko's later poems contain philosophical elements, concerning themselves with the topics of technical progress and place of humanity in the world.

Outside of poetry Malyshko was also known as a librettist, co-operating with composers Yuliy Meitus and Heorhiy Maiboroda, as well as literary critic and translator. A number of his poems were turned into songs, most famously Kyiv Waltz and Song about the Towel.

== Notable publications ==
=== Poetry collections ===
- Fatherland (Ukrainian: Батьківщина, 1936)
- Lyrics (Ukrainian: Лірика, 1938) - nominated for the 1947 State Prize
- From the Book of Life (Ukrainian: З книги життя, 1938)
- Birth of Sons (Ukrainian: Народження синів, 1939)
- Skylarks (Ukrainian: Жайворонки, 1940)
- Days of Dawn (Ukrainian: Зореві дні, 1940)
- Letters of Red Army Serviceman Opanas Baida (Ukrainian: Листи червоноармійця Опанаса Байди, 1940)
- March (Ukrainian: Березень, 1940)
- Rise for the Battle! (Ukrainian: До бою вставайте!, 1941)
- Over the Fires (Ukrainian: Понад пожари, 1942)
- My Ukraine! (Ukrainian: Україно моя!, 1942)
- Tale of the Campaign (Ukrainian: Слово о полку, 1943)
- Battle (Ukrainian: Битва, 1943)
- She-Prisoner (Ukrainian: Полонянка, 1944)
- Yaroslavna (Ukrainian: Ярославна, 1946)
- Spring Book (Ukrainian: Весняна книга, 1949)
- Beyond the Blue Sea (Ukrainian: За синім морем, 1950) - nominated for the 1951 State Prize
- Gifts to the Leader (Ukrainian: Дарунки вождю, 1952)
- Book of Brothers (Ukrainian: Книга братів, 1954)
- What is Written Down by Me (Ukrainian: Що записано мною, 1956)
- My Mother's Heart (Ukrainian: Серце моєї матері, 1959)
- Noon of Age (Ukrainian: Полудень віку, 1960)
- Oracular Voice (Ukrainian: Віщий голос, 1961)
- Letters at Dawn (Ukrainian: Листи на світанні, 1961)
- Transparency (Ukrainian: Прозорість, 1962)
- Distant Orbits (Ukrainian: Далекі орбіти, 1962) - nominated for the 1964 State Prize of Ukraine
- Road Under the Sycamores (Ukrainian: Дорога під яворами, 1964) - nominated for the 1969 State Prize
- Rue (Ukrainian: Рута, 1966)
- Blue Chronicle (Ukrainian: Синій літопис, 1968)
- August of My Soul (Ukrainian: Серпень душі моєї, 1970)

=== Poems ===
- Yaryna (Ukrainian: Ярина, 1938)
- Karmaliuk (Ukrainian: Кармалюк, 1940)
- Duma of Cossack Danylo (Ukrainian: Дума про козака Данила, 1941)
- Prometheus (Ukrainian: Прометей, 1946) - nominated for the 1947 State Prize

=== Literary criticism ===
- Thoughts on Poetry (Ukrainian: Думки про поезію, 1959)
- Word about a Poet. M.T. Rylskyi and his works (Ukrainian: Слово про поета. М. Т. Рильський та його творчість, 1960)

== Awards and honors ==
- Two Orders of Lenin (1960, 1962)
- Order of the Red Banner (1944)
- Order of the Red Banner of Labour (1967)
- Order of the Red Star (1943)
- Order of the Badge of Honour (1939)
- Two Stalin Prizes (1947, 1951)
- USSR State Prize (1969)
- Shevchenko National Prize (1964)

== Sources ==
- Українська Літературна Енциклопедія. — К., 1995. — Т. 3: К-Н. — С. 267-286.
