= R. Glier Kyiv Institute of Music =

Ukrainian music conservatory in Kyiv

R. Glier Kyiv Municipal Academy of Music
- Київська муніципальна академія музики імені Рейнгольда Глієра
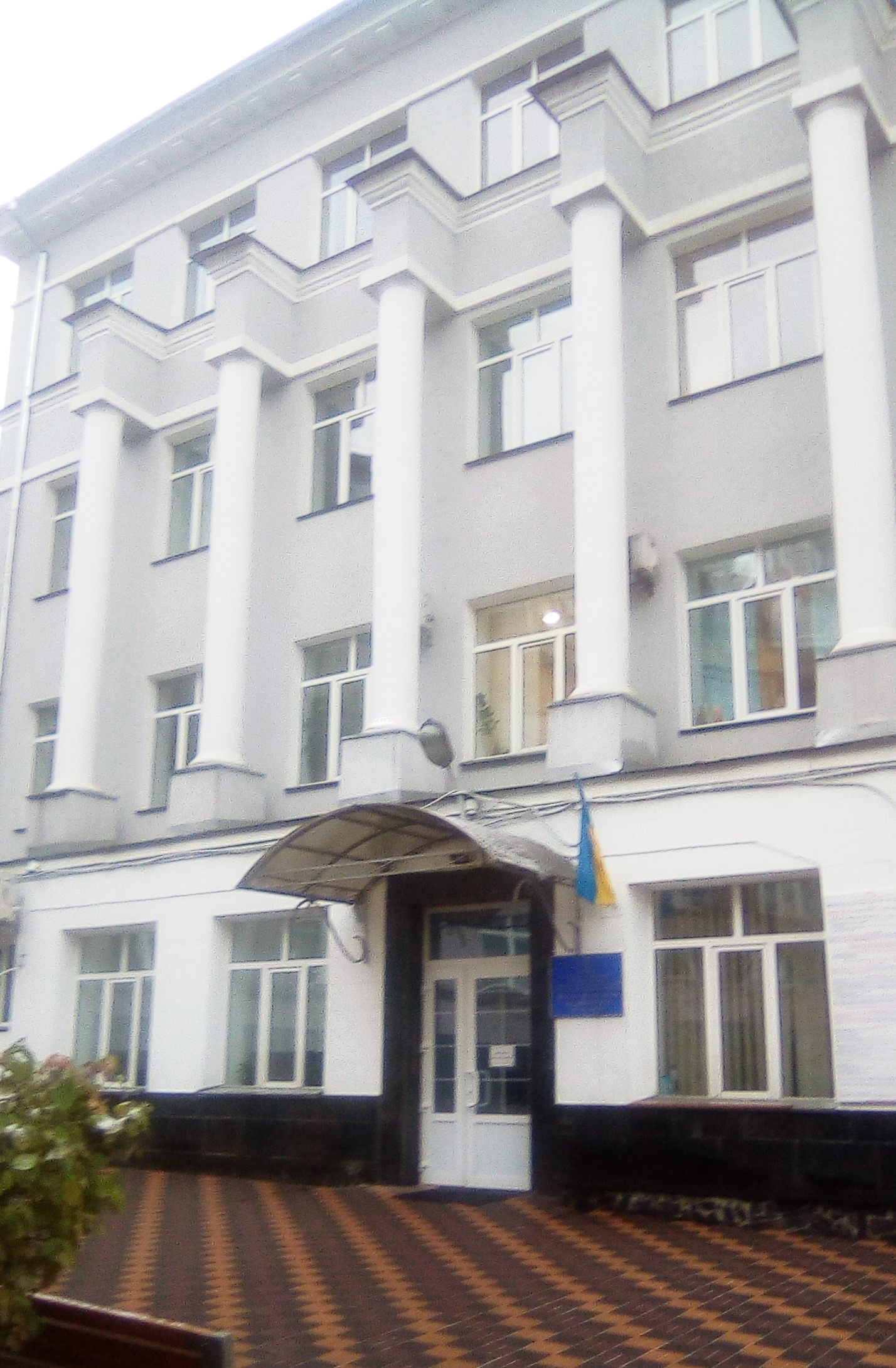
- Established: 1868
- Accreditation: Ministry of Education and Science of Ukraine
- Location: Kyiv, Ukraine
- Language: Ukrainian
- Website: glieracademy.org

The Glière Music College is the second oldest Ukrainian music conservatory established in the late 19th century in Kyiv, named for Reinhold Glière. In the early 20th century it was split into two music schools, Glière Music College and Kyiv Conservatory (now Kyiv Academy of Music). Over the past century, many world-famous musicians have graduated from this school, such as Vladimir Horowitz and Mélovin.

In 2008, the R. M. Glière Kyiv State Music University was reorganised into the R. M. Glière Kyiv Institute of Music.

In 2018, the institution celebrated its 150th anniversary at the state level, which became an occasion for another renaming. Since 2018 – Reinhold Glier Kyiv Municipal Academy of Music.

== Notable alumni ==
- Jerry Heil, singer
- Tina Karol, singer
- Alex Luna, Ukrainian countertenor
- Mélovin, singer
- Iryna Bilyk, singer
- Kateryna Buzhynska, singer
- Zlata Ognevich, singer
- Evgenia Vlasova, Ukrainian singer-songwriter.
- Lena Belkina, Ukrainian mezzo-soprano
- Liudmyla Monastyrska, Ukrainian spinto soprano
- Lyubov Uspenskaya, singer
- Vladyslav Buialskyi, opera singer
- Nina Andriievska, composer, journalist
- Vadym Shmatok, Saxophonist

== See also ==
List of universities in Ukraine
