= Comfy (Ukrainian retailer) =

COMFY
- Type: Retail chain
- Industry: Retail
- Genre: Home appliances and electronics
- Founded: 2005; 21 years ago
- Founder: Stanislav Ronis
- Divisions: 115 offline stores
- Website: https://comfy.ua/

Comfy — a chain of home appliances and electronics stores in Ukraine. As of December 30, 2025, the COMFY network comprises 115 stores. The eponymous online store Comfy.ua is among the top 5 largest online players in the market.

== Company history ==
COMFY began its active development in 2007 following a merger with Svitlana Hutsul's company "Pobuttekhnika". The shareholders of "Pobuttekhnika" and Comfy established a new company on equal terms. At the time of the merger, the COMFY network, which had entered the market in 2006, comprised 26 stores in 13 cities across the Dnipropetrovsk, Zaporizhzhia, Cherkasy, Kirovohrad, Poltava, and Mykolaiv regions. The "Pobuttekhnika" store chain was founded in 1992 in Donetsk and, at the time of the merger, consisted of 29 stores in 17 cities across the Donetsk, Luhansk regions, and Crimea.

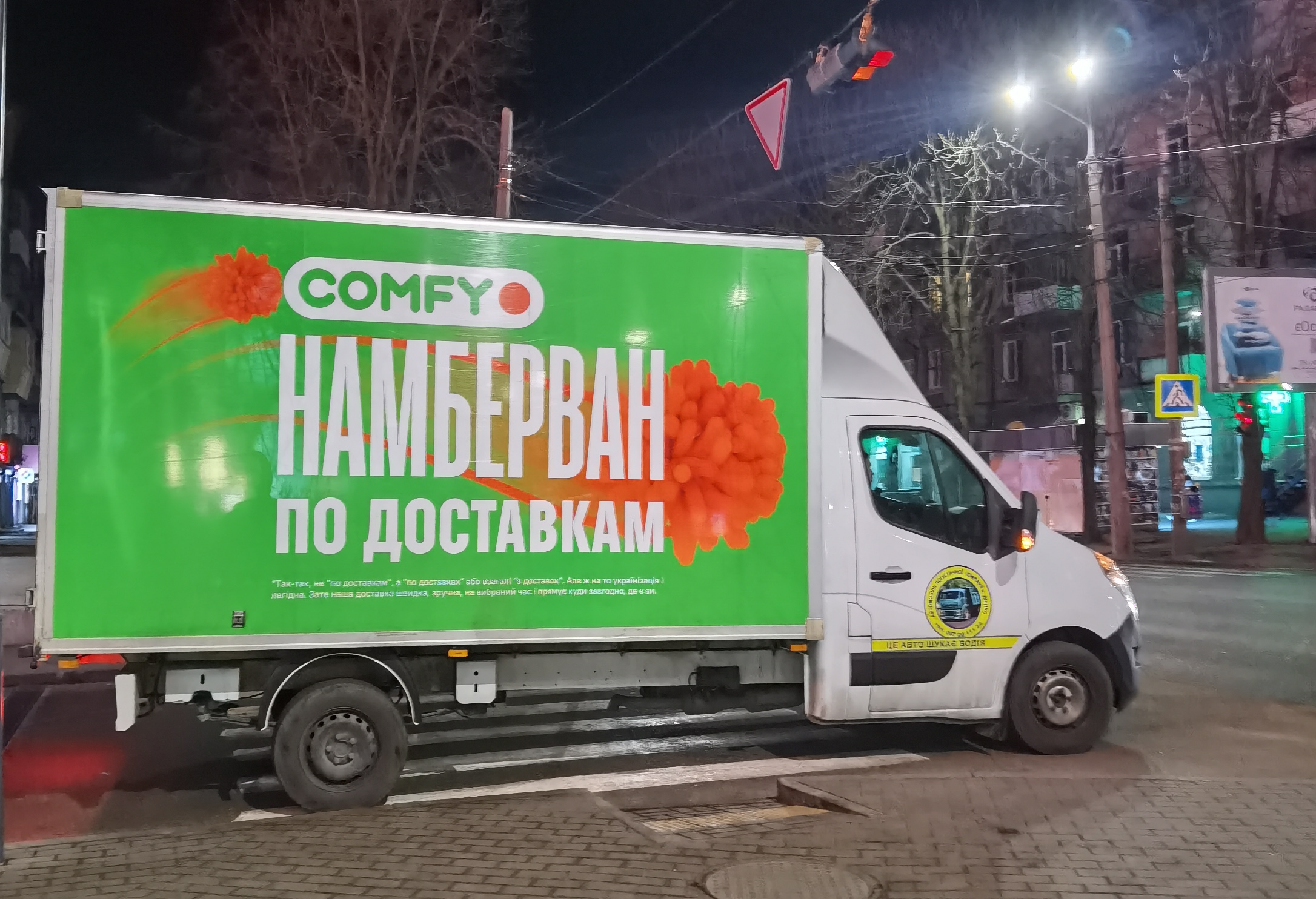
COMFY delivery van

In 2010, the company abandoned contraband "grey" goods. The transition to trading exclusively in legally imported goods was also supported by Foxtrot.

In 2011, COMFY opened 15 new and 50 renovated stores across Ukraine.

In 2013, the company came under pressure from tax authorities and the prosecutor's office as a result of its refusal to deal in contraband "grey" goods and, consequently, for not paying bribes to officials.

In 2014, the online store comfy.ua entered the top ten largest online shops in the Ukrainian internet segment.

From July 1, 2025, all stores in the network introduced "Quiet Hours". Every day from opening until 12:00, each store reduces lighting brightness, noise levels, and background music in the sales floor, while televisions, information panels with dynamic displays, and most equipment are switched off.

=== Appearance of a Ukrainian-language Interface ===
From 2006 to 2016, the Comfy website (comfy.com.ua, later comfy.ua) had an exclusively Russian-language interface. In September 2014, the company launched a test version of a Ukrainian-language interface. In late 2015, reports began appearing in the media about the rollout of a Ukrainian-language interface, and on March 3, 2016, eleven years after the company's founding it announced the launch of a full Ukrainian-language version of the website on its official blog.

== Social initiatives ==
In December 2020, Comfy and the Kiddo Charitable Foundation launched the "I Will Be...!" platform to collect donations for seriously ill children.

Since 2021, the company has been collecting used batteries in its stores in partnership with the organisation «Batteries, give yourselves up!.

Since 2023, the company has also been supporting Pride Month.

=== Support for the Military ===
On the first day of the invasion, Comfy transferred 30 million hryvnias to the National Bank of Ukraine account to support the Armed Forces of Ukraine, and in early March 2022 donated a further 30 million hryvnias. In autumn 2022, Comfy, together with the Serhiy Prytula Foundation, completed its own fundraising campaign for 15 Valkyria UAV systems.

In July 2025, COMFY joined a fundraising campaign by the band Okean Elzy and contributed 515,000 hryvnias for drones for the Defence Intelligence of Ukraine. As of December 2025, the total support provided to the military and volunteers since the beginning of the invasion exceeded 170 million hryvnias.

Comfy sells charitable merchandise under the name "Dobro nesetsya" ("Good is on its way"), with 100% of the profits transferred to the "Come Back Alive" foundation; from December 2023 to December 2025, this amount totalled 930,000 hryvnias. From the sale of goods marked "KRASHCH" at COMFY, nearly 6 million hryvnias were transferred to the Come Back Alive foundation.

== Logos ==
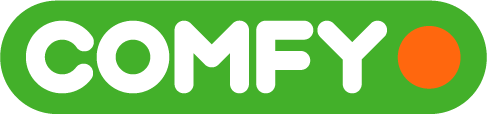

== Shops ==
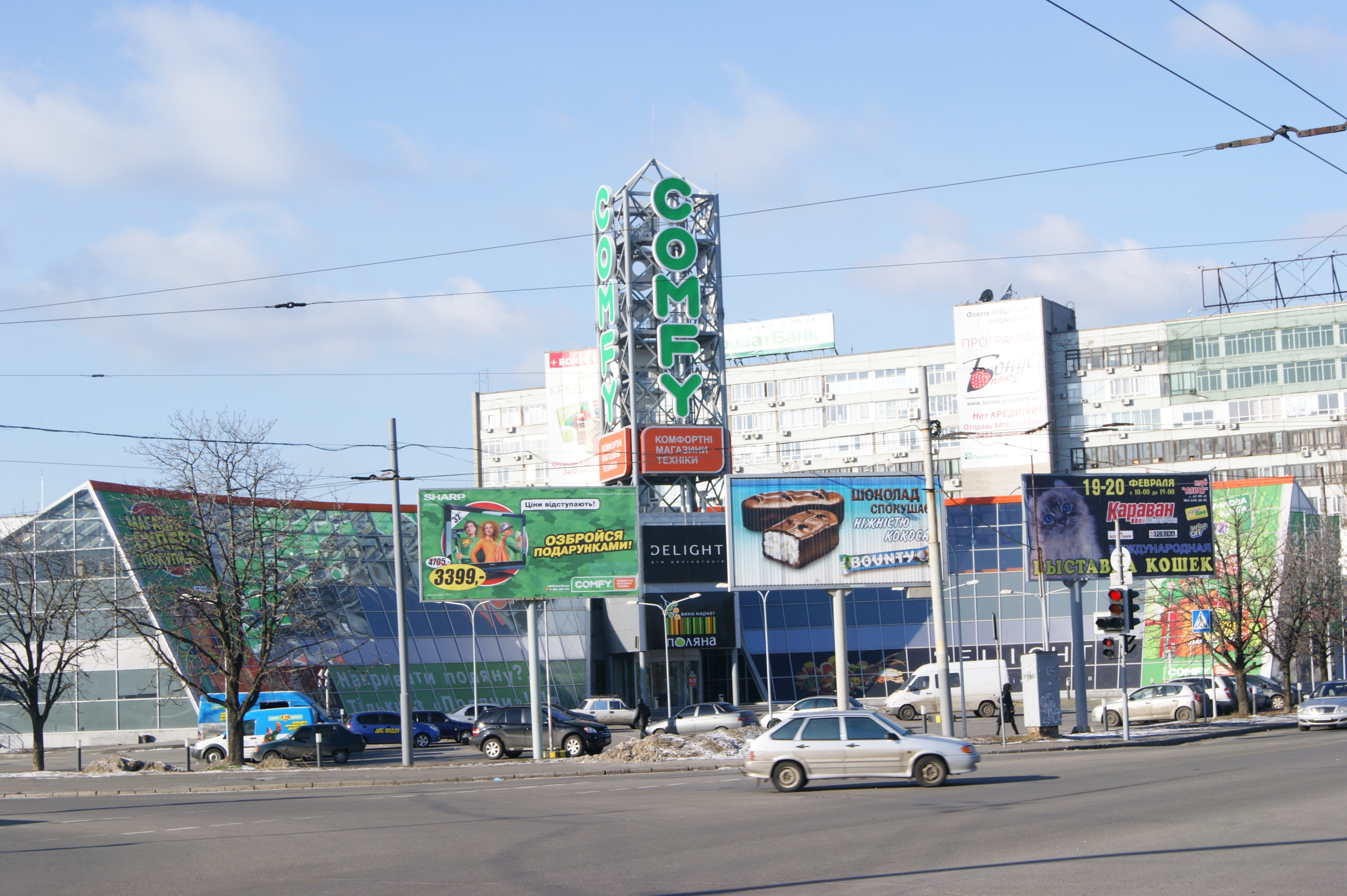

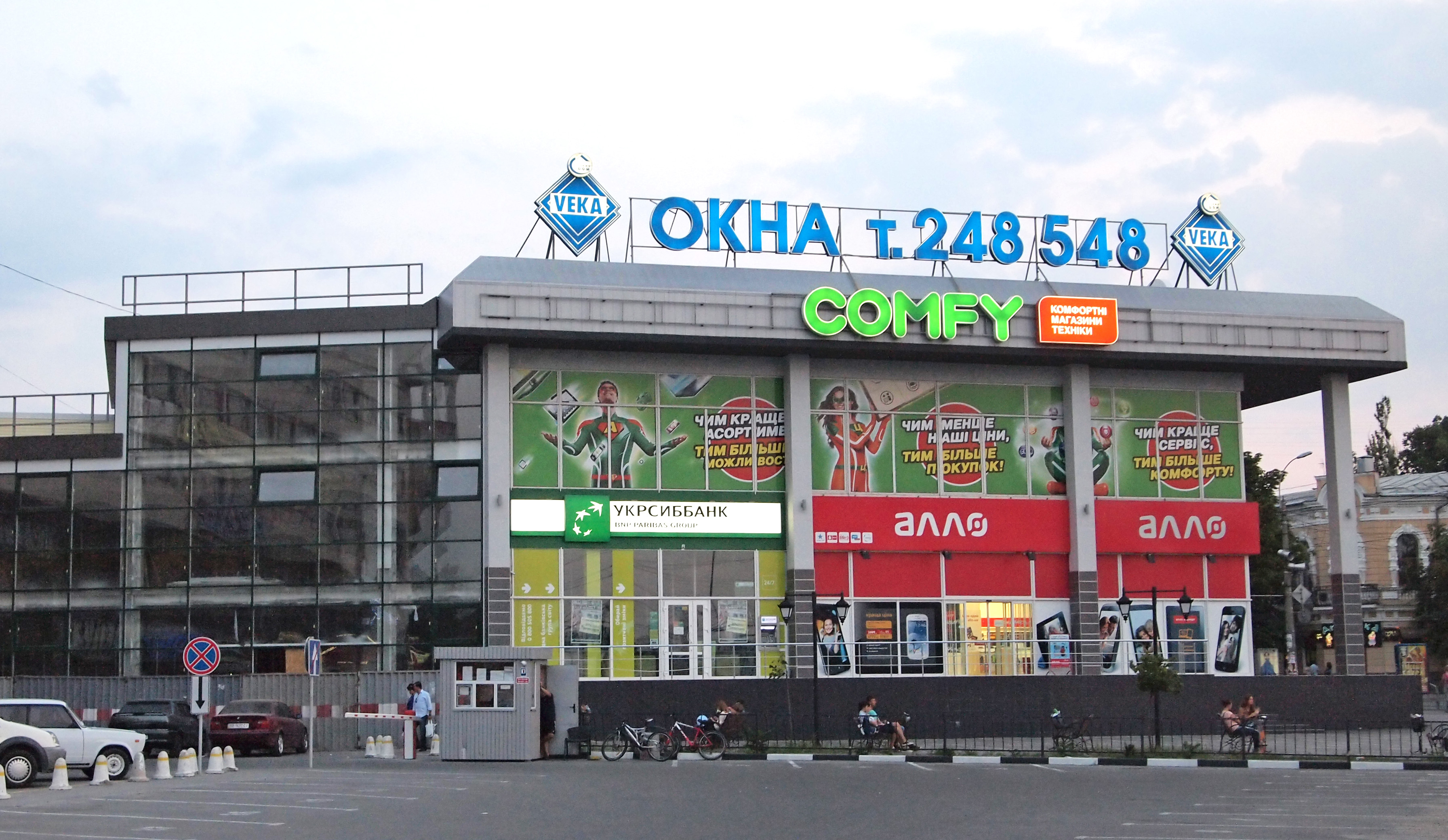

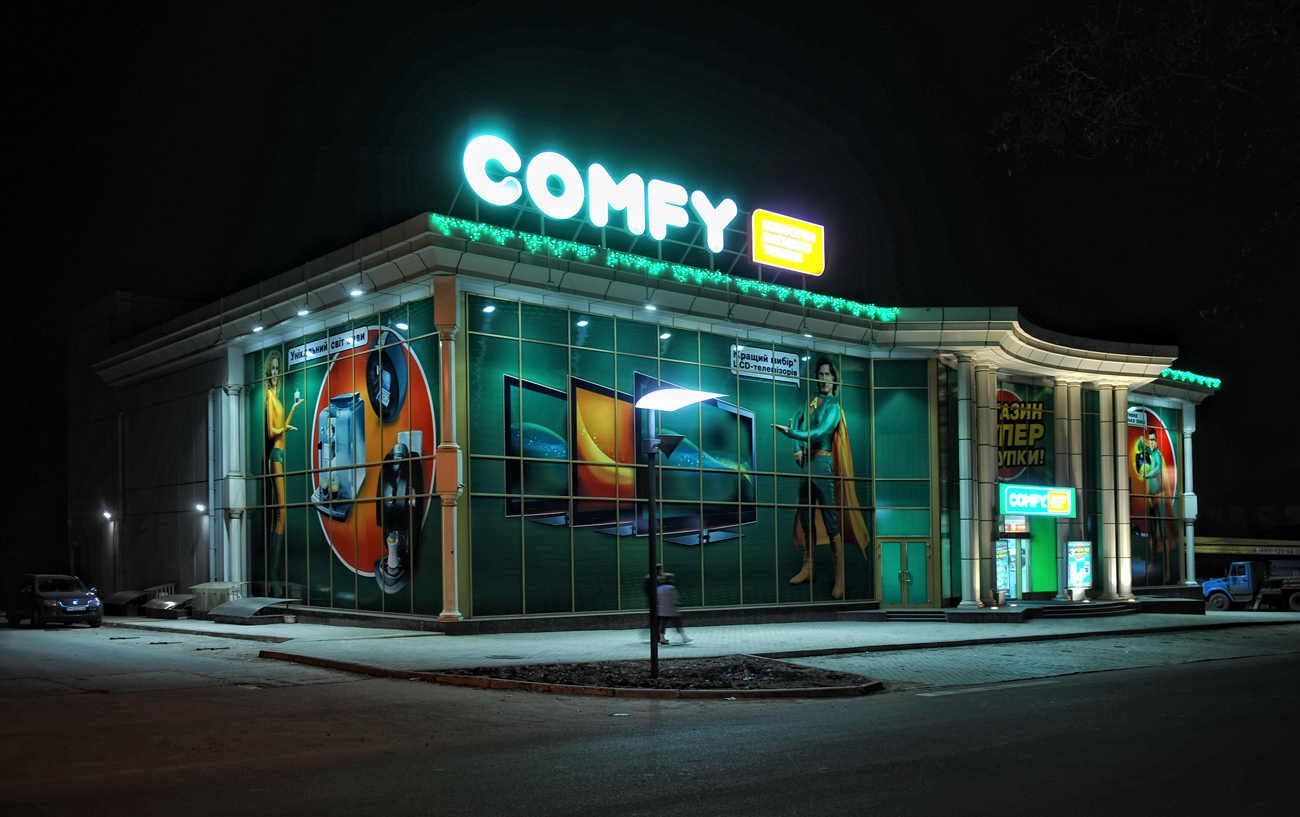

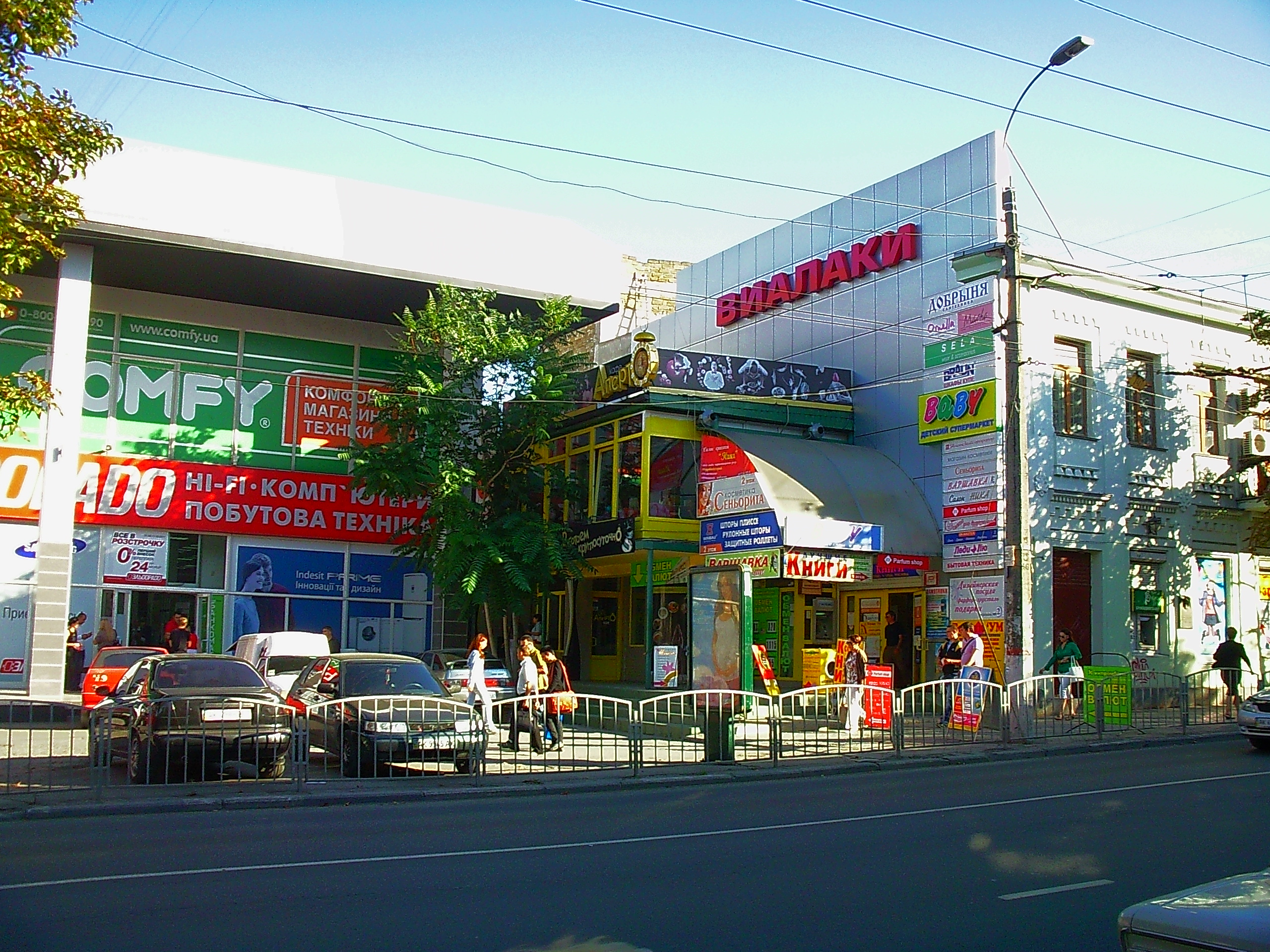

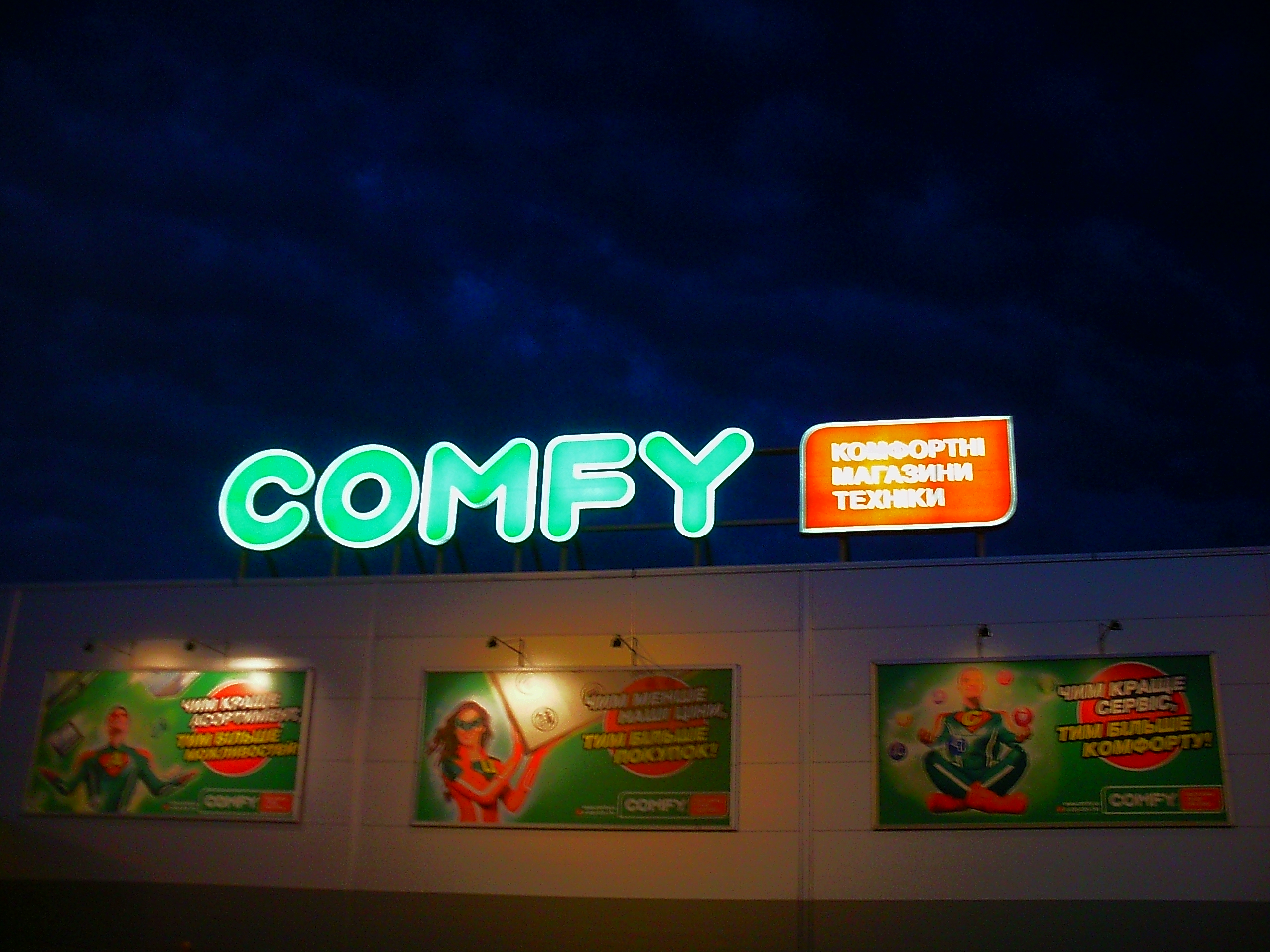

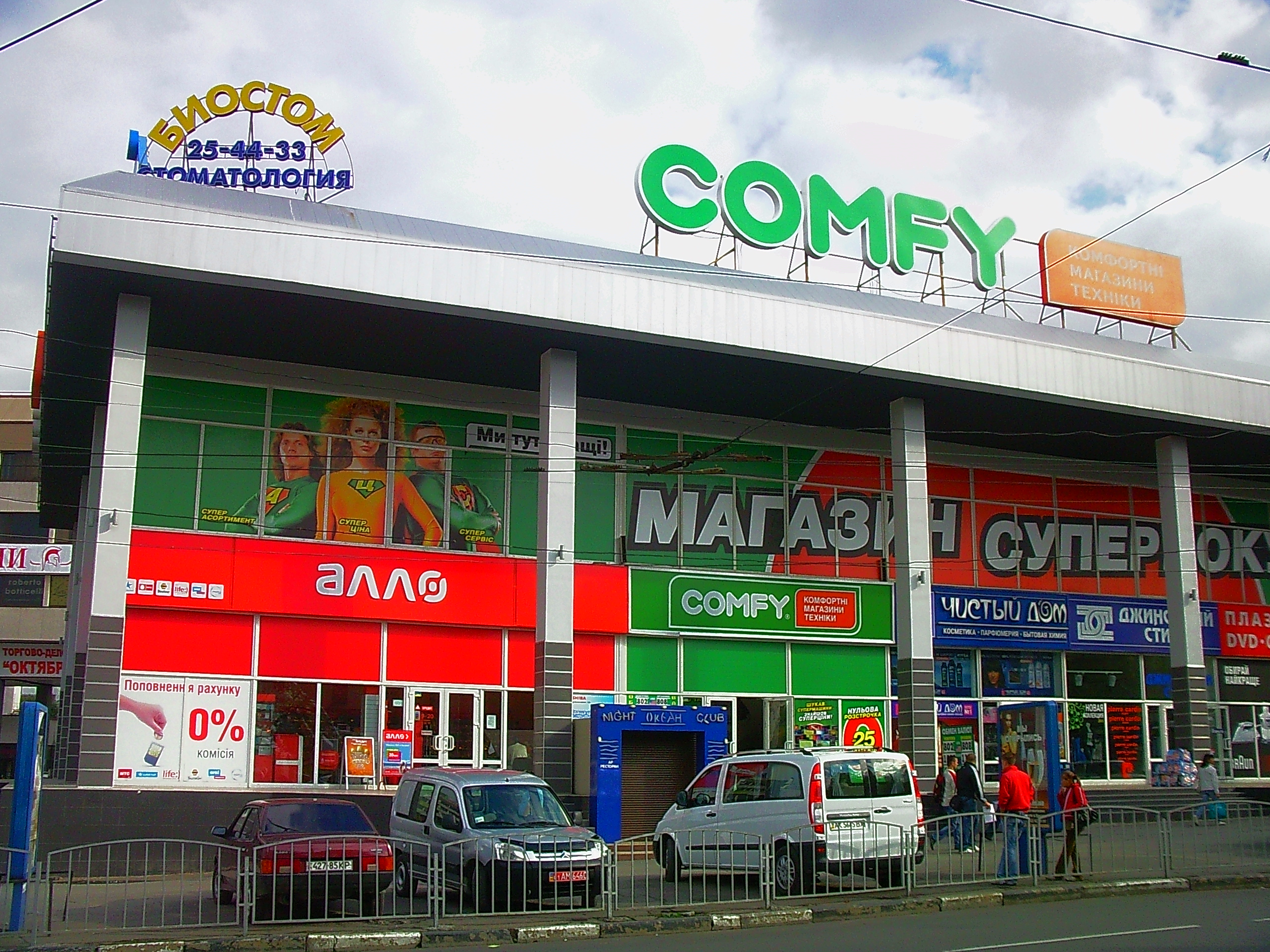
