= Hennadiy Vykhodtsev =

Ukrainian businessman (born 1960)

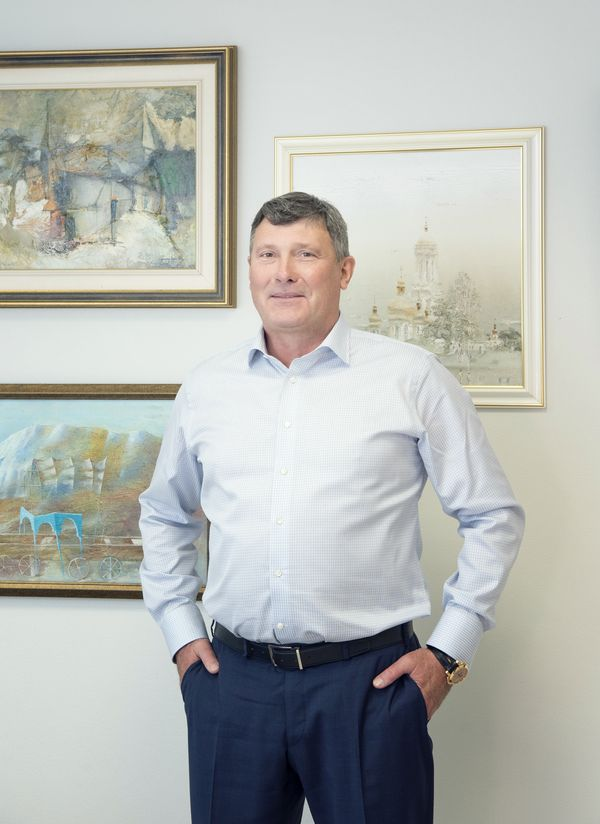
- Born: July 5, 1960 (age 66); Kyiv, Ukraine
- Citizenship: Ukrainian
- Education: National Pedagogical Drahomanov University
- Occupations: Entrepreneur, social activist
- Children: 3
- Awards: Order of St. Equal to Apostles Prince Vladimir

Hennadiy Anatoliyovych Vykhodtsev (Ukrainian: Геннадій Анатолійович Виходцев; born 5 July 1960) is a Ukrainian businessman. He is chairman of the board of founders of Foxtrot company.

== Biography ==
In 1977 he finished school № 23 in Kyiv. In 1981 he graduated from the M. Horkiy State Pedagogical University (nowadays National Pedagogical Drahomanov University of Kyiv).

Upon graduation, he worked as a general engineering teacher in Kyiv secondary school № 65.

From 1981 to 1983 he did his military service. Missile corps, Ukraine. After that, Hennadiy Vykhodtsev worked as a master of industrial training at Kyiv Construction Vocational School №20 for 7 years (from 1893 to 1990).

In 1994, Hennadiy Vykhodtsev and his partner Valerii Makovetskyi launched a wholesale electronics imports business and opened their first outlet under the Foxtrot brand in Kharkiv.

2004 – Hennadiy Vykhodtsev cofounded the Foxtrot Group of Companies and headed its board of founders. The Group gain the lead in its market segments: retail trade in household appliances, retail trade in watches, real estate management — at the end of 2018, the Foxtrot retail chain took the sixth place among Ukrainian retail chains and 76th place in the rating of the largest Ukrainian companies.

Since 2010 - Vykhodtsev is a Chairman of the Board of the Social Center "Perspective".

== Awards ==
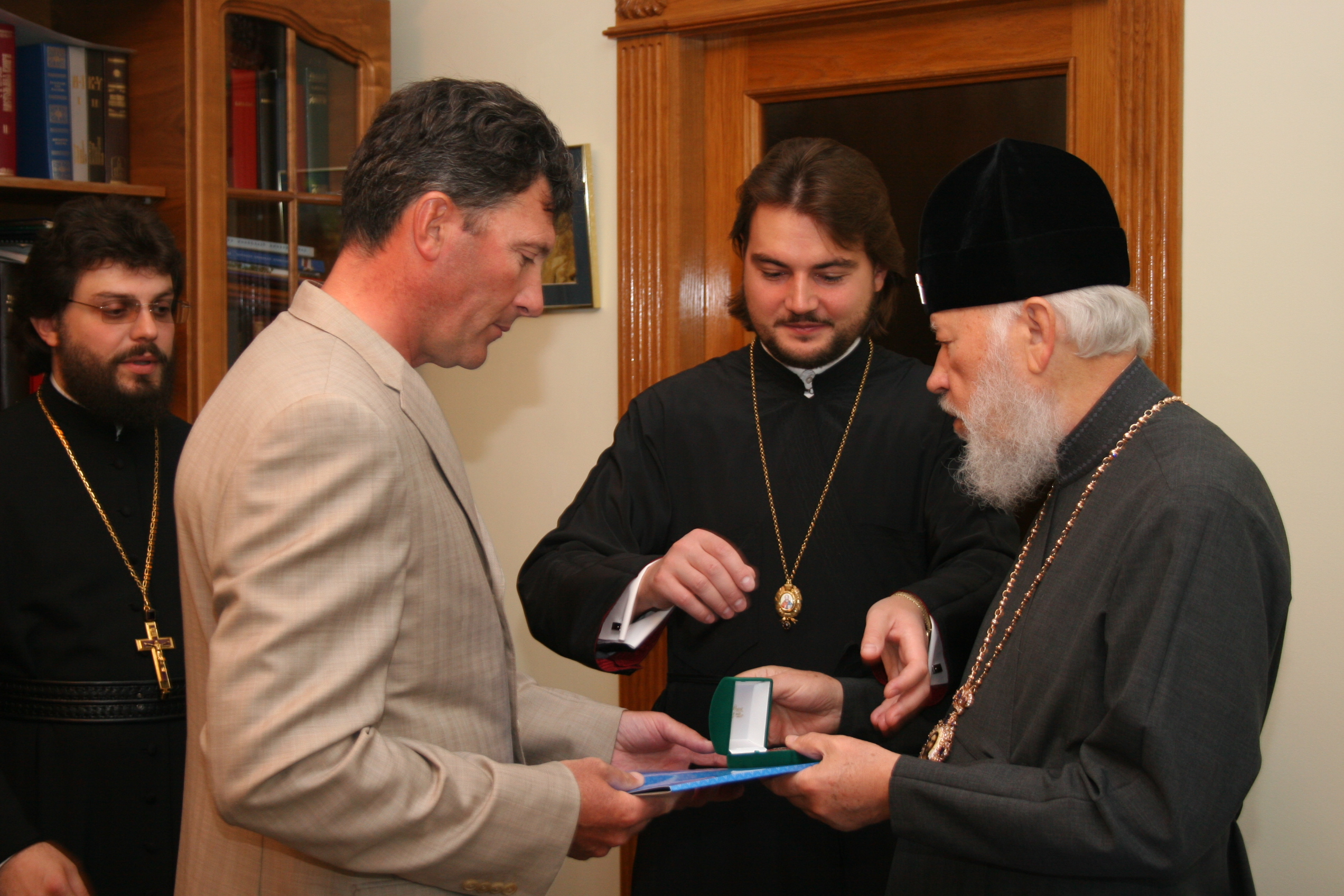

In 2008, the Ukraine's Orthodox Church conferred the Order of St. Equal to Apostles Prince Vladimir, 3rd Class, to Hennadiy Vykhodtsev for helping the Church to take care of children deprived of parental care (the social project «A big heart of a little life»).
