= Makovetsky =

Makovetsky is a surname. Notable people with the surname include:

- Sergei Makovetsky (born 1958), Soviet and Ukrainian-born Russian film and stage actor
- Valerii Makovetsky (born 1961), Ukrainian businessman, co-founder and chairman of the board to the Foxtrot company
