= Alexander Sparinsky =

Alexander Sparinsky Алекса́ндр Ио́сифович Спари́нский
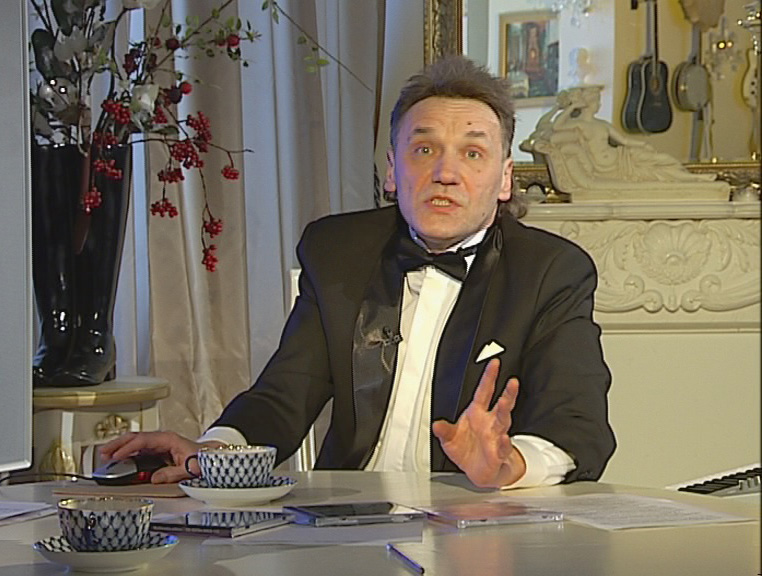

Background information
- Born: Lutsk, Ukraine
- Occupations: Musicologist, Composer, Producer
- Website: www.sparinsky.kiev.ua

Alexander Sparinsky (Russian: Алекса́ндр Ио́сифович Спари́нский, Ukrainian: Олекса́ндр Йо́сипович Спари́нський; is a Ukrainian musicologist, composer and producer. A member of Ukrainian Association of Cinematographers.

== Biography ==
Sparinsky studied at the Kyiv Pedagogical Institute (now National Pedagogical Dragomanov University), Music Pedagogical faculties from 1971 to 1975. In 1979 began composer's career.

== Principal works ==
1979–2016 – created children's, folk, pop, variety songs, character instrumental pieces, TV and Radio Regional and National Ad Jingles; choral works A Capella and with accompaniment; Oratorios On Earth A Big Family We Are and St. Michaels Blessing, music for theatrical performances, films (incl. animation, documentary, TV movies), children's musicals, operetta and folk opera.

His songs were performed by Ukrainian and Russian pop stars: Vakhtang Kikabidze, Natasha Koroleva, Ani Lorak; folk artists: Nina Matviyenko, “Veseli Muzyky” ensemble; Kyiv Chamber Choir, Revutsky Boys Choir and many others.

His music works Nativity of Christ, Spring Singers, Rejoice! and Midsummer Night Magic.

== Producer works ==
- 1995–2013 – All Ukraine center for Festivals, public events and concert programs "Kobzar" - composer, music editor, producer-supervisor.
- 2001–2016 – Atlantic Record company Freelance Producer.
- 1991–2016 – performances, concerts preparation and organization for the popularization of the Ukrainian Art on the West: USA, Great Britain, Germany, France, Spain, Belgium, Holland, Hong Kong, Japan, and China.

== Musicology ==
- 1996 – Discussions about the Ukrainian Music – Adelaide, Melbourne, Sydney (Australia).
- 1994, 1991 – Ukraine and Music – London, Nottingham, Manchester, Bradford, Keighley (Great Britain).
- 1991, 1994, 2002 – Art to the Children – Schools of Manchester, Bradford and London (Great Britain).
- 1984, 1995 – Variety – it is Music!, Children's Philharmonic – Kyiv (Ukraine).
- 1983–2013 – Freelance journalist – art critics – author of articles, Radio and TV programs devoted to music, musicians and culture.
