= Nadiya Kudelia =

Ukrainian singer

Nadiya Kudelia (Ukrainian: Куделя Надія Павлівна; 15 October 1936 – 15 September 2022) was a Ukrainian singer, coloratura soprano, Merited Artist of Ukraine, People's Artist of Ukraine (2021).

== Biography ==
She received her education at the Kyiv Conservatory in the class of Maria Donets-Tessier. As a student, she won the World Youth Festival in Vienna (1959). In 1964, she became a laureate of the J. Enescu Competition in Romania, and in 1967, she was awarded a diploma at the Young Singers Competition in Bulgaria.

In the 1960s and 1980s, she was a soloist at the Kyiv Opera. Her repertoire included about 30 roles, including Traviata from Verdi's opera of the same name, which she sang at the premiere of this opera in 1964. She taught at the Drahomanov National University.

== Awards ==
- Merited Artist of Ukraine
- People's Artist of Ukraine
