= Vitalii Dribnytsia =

YouTuber (born 1965)

Vox Veritatis
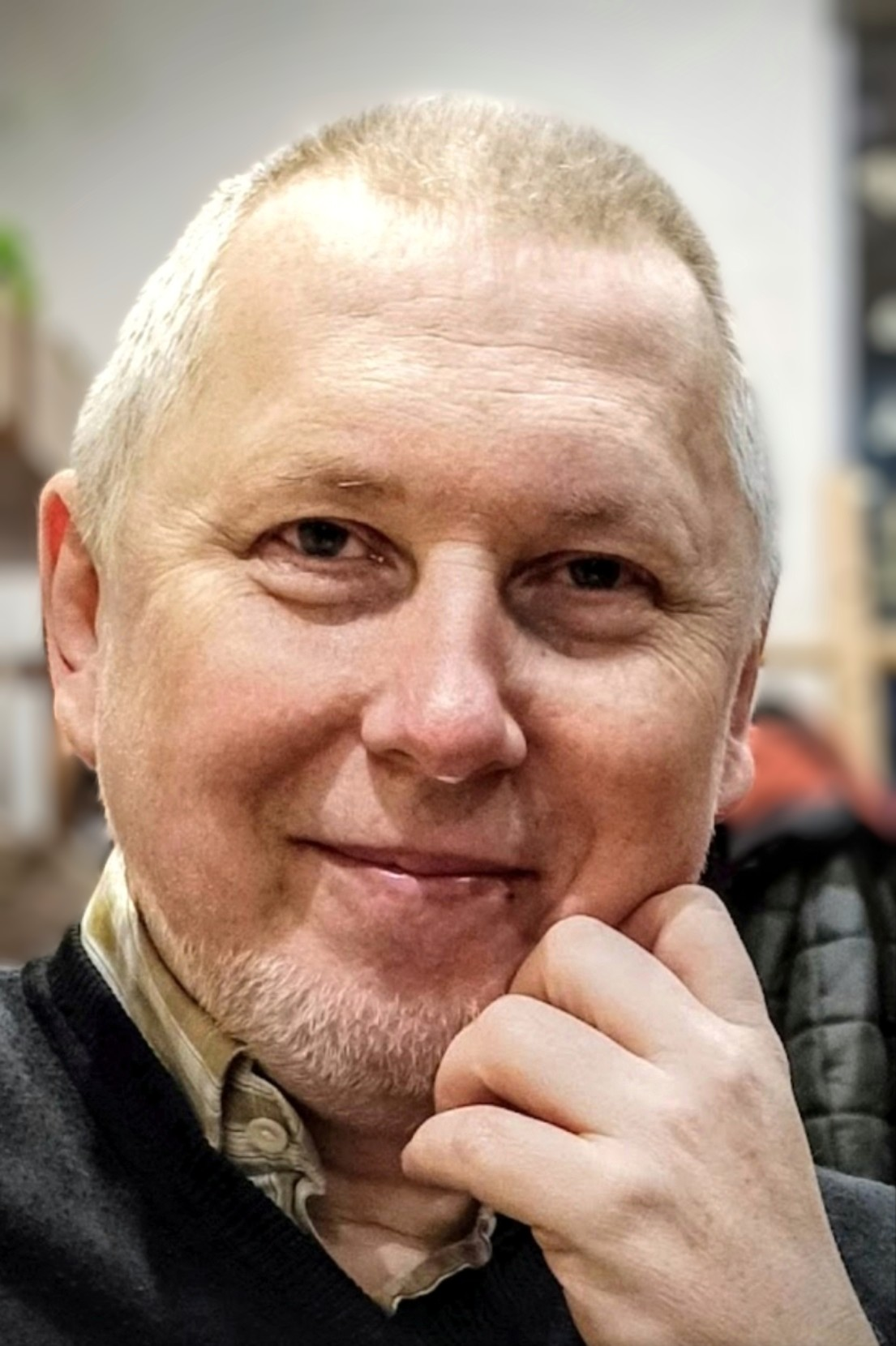
- Dribnytsia in 2020
- Born: Vitalii Oleksandrovych Dribnytsia; June 28, 1965 (age 61); Krivoi Rog, Ukrainian SSR, Soviet Union
- Occupations: Historian; teacher; co-author of school books; methodist

YouTube information
- Channel: Vox veritatis Голос правди
- Years active: 2021–present
- Genre: Chatting in Chat-roulette
- Subscribers: 609 thousand
- Views: 275.91 million
- Last updated: November 10, 2026

Vitalii Oleksandrovych Dribnytsia (Ukrainian: Віталій Олександрович Дрібниця; born June 28, 1965), known online as Vox Veritatis, is a Ukrainian historian and history teacher from Bila Tserkva. He is known as a co-author of school books and a YouTuber. He is a member of National Union of Journalists of Ukraine since May 31, 2025. He is an author of YouTube channels "Vox Veritatis" and "Fox Veritatis".

== Biography ==
Vitalii Dribnytsia was born on June 28, 1965, in a family of scientists in Kryvyi Rih in Dnipropetrovsk region. His father, Dribnytsia Oleksandr Vasyliovych, was a Candidate of Technical Sciences. From 1972 to 1982, he studied at Secondary School No. 8 in Kryvyi Rih, graduating from school with highest scores and receiving a gold medal.

After graduating from school, he went to the mining institute to the faculty of mechanical engineering in Kryvyi Rih, but later stopped his studies.

From 1983 to 1985, he served in the ranks of the Soviet Army in the Central Group of Forces (Czechoslovakia).

From 1986 to 1991, Dribnytsia studied in the historical department at the National Pedagogical Drahomanov University, receiving later a diploma with honors (so-called "Red Diploma").

From 1991 to 2001, he worked as a history teacher at secondary school No. 1 in Stavyshche and at Gymnasium No. 1 in Bila Tserkva from 2001 to 2003. After the collapse of the USSR, due to the old Soviet school history curriculum existed in 1990s, he printed several hundred copies of his own history textbook in a printing house without any coordination with the Ministry of Education. He wrote the second textbook together with his former teacher, then he began writing his ones alone. The textbook for 8th grade on world history was written in collaboration with associate professor, candidate of historical sciences of the Kyiv State Pedagogical Institute V. Kryzhanivska and in 1988, received the stamp "Recommended by the Ministry of Education of Ukraine".

From 2003 to 2020, he was a teacher of social sciences at the humanitarian and pedagogical college in Bila Tserkva and a teacher at the Department of Pedagogical Mastery of the Institute. In April 2020, he was one of the speakers at a historical webinar for teachers organized by the Ukrainian Institute for Holocaust Studies “Tkuma” and the Ukrainian Educational Publishing Center “Orion” (Kyiv) on the topic “Methodology: convenient for teachers and interesting for students”. In 2021, due to health reasons, he was forced to stop his teaching career.

Dribnytsia was a member of the jury of the IV stage of the All-Ukrainian Student History Olympiad from 2005 to 2013.

In 2021, he began blogging, refuting pro-Russian narratives about Ukraine in conversations with Russians in chat roulette. His own YouTube channel “Vox Veritatis” during the Russian invasion of Ukraine became one of the symbols of public dialogue with Russians, refuting hostile narratives against Ukraine.

In 2023, a blogger spoke about Russians’ perceptions of Ukraine: “For them, Ukraine is a historical part of Russia. And they absolutely consciously believe that they are returning their historical territories. This is what Putin said, but it is also what corresponds to the concepts of the ‘deep Russian people’. They consider Ukraine to be part of Russian territory that was either polonized or austrianized — something like that. But they honestly believe that this is their territory. And it is practically impossible to overcome this”.

He also founded the playlist "Historian in Every Saturday", where he invites professional historians (not lower than PhD) to a dialogue. Since September 2024, these conversations have been on the list of recommended by the Ministry of Education and Science of Ukraine.

In 2024, Vitalii Dribnytsia was included into the top-50 bloggers of Ukraine according to Focus. In 2025, he became a member of National Union of Journalists of Ukraine and a laureate of the Pavlo Shtepa International Prize.

In August 2026, it became known that Dribnytsia had been battling cancer for almost 10 years and his condition had deteriorated critically after another course of chemotherapy, so a fundraiser was announced for treatment. In September, he left for Germany, which led to a temporary suspension of broadcasts, which were gradually resumed a month later.

== Awards and honors ==
- Member 3rd Class of the Order of Merit (2025)
- 1998 — winner of the Kyiv regional stage and diploma winner of the Final of the All-Ukrainian competition "Teacher of the Year-1998" in the nomination "History"

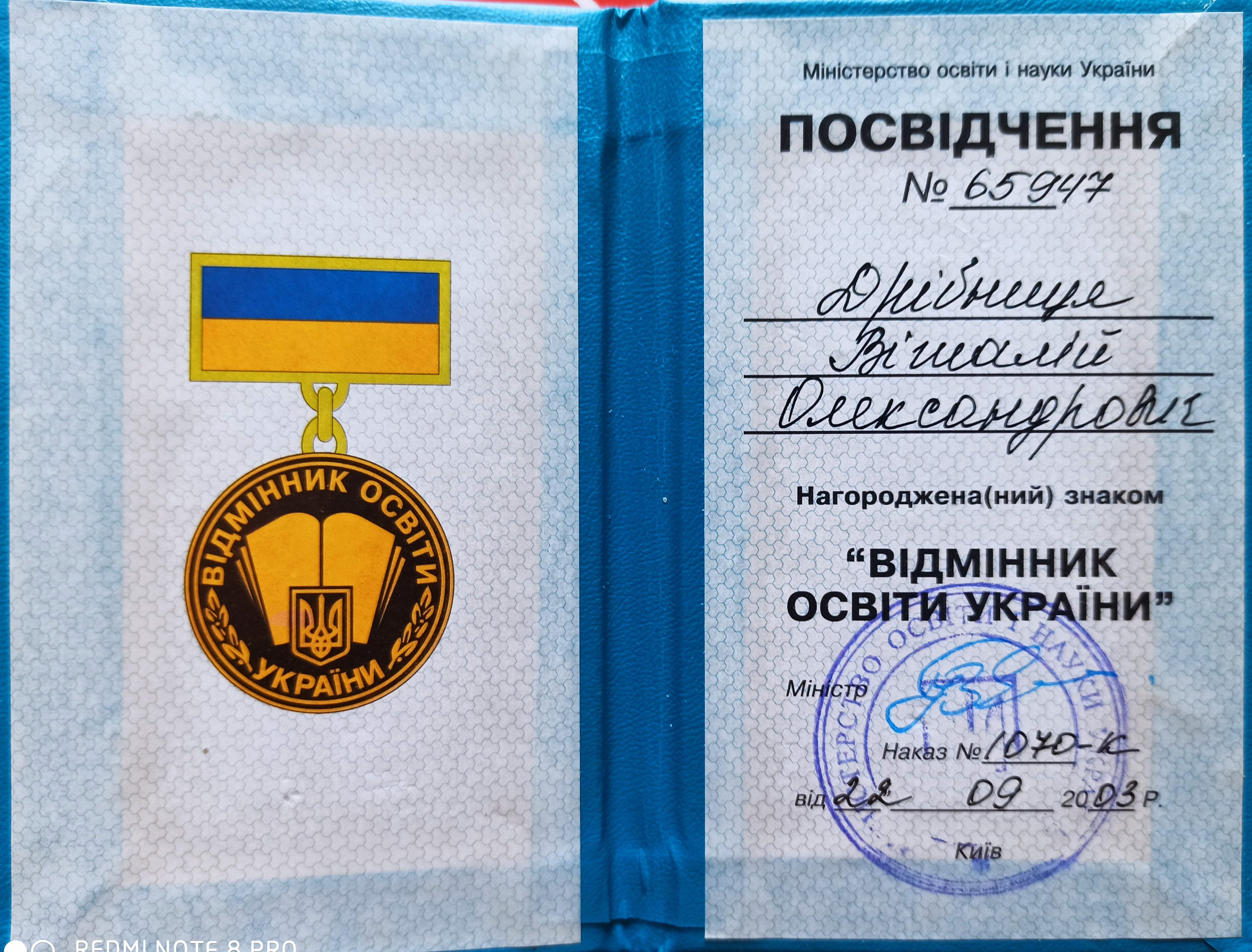
The "Excellent Educationist of Ukraine" title and diploma as it is awarded to Dribnytsia

- Excellent Educationist of Ukraine (September 22, 2003)
- Top 50 bloggers of Ukraine according to Focus, 17th place (2024)

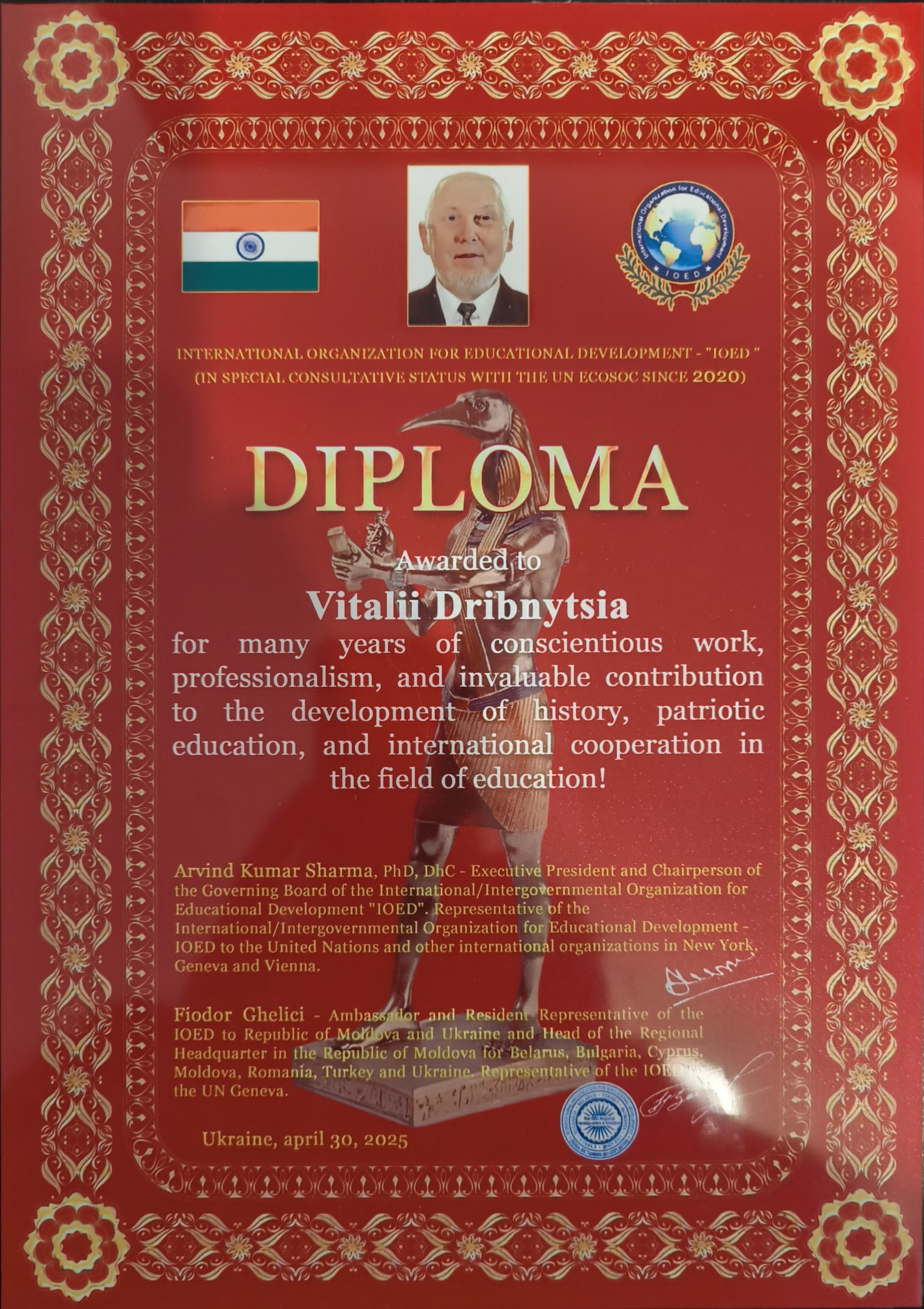
The diploma of IOED awarded to Dribnytsia

- Diploma of IOED (April 30, 2025).
- Breastplate "For Merit to the Kyiv Region" (2025)

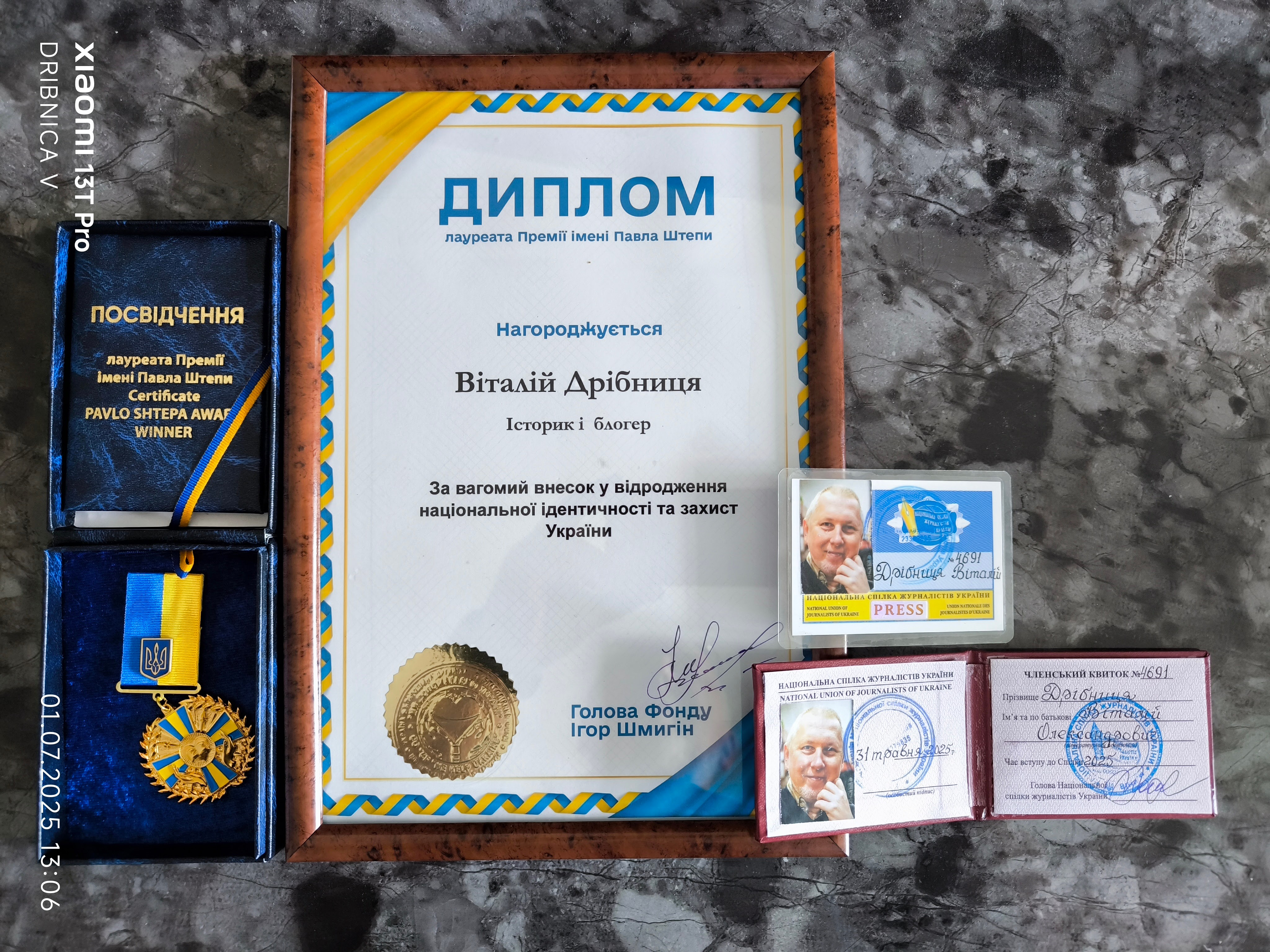
Diploma of the laureate of P. Shtepa International Prize and certificate of the National Union of Journalists of Ukraine of Dribnytsia

- Pavlo Shtepa International Prize (2025)

== School books and articles ==
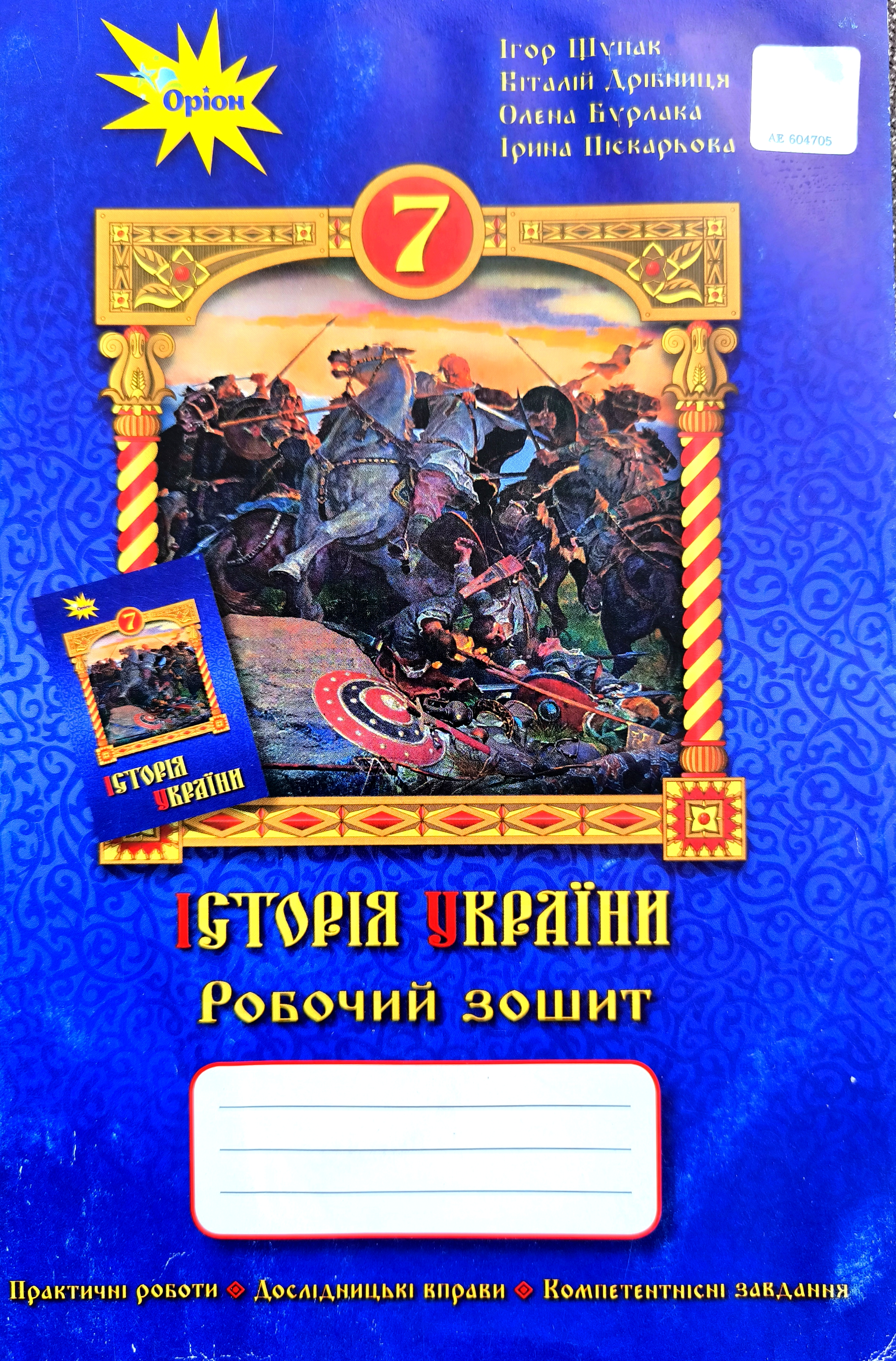
7th grade "History of Ukraine" textbook, co-written by Dribnytsia

- Дрібниця В. О. Новітня історія (1918-1945 рр.) [Текст] : навч.-метод. посібник з всесвітньої історії для 10 кл. / авт.-упоряд В. О. Дрібниця. — Суми, 1996. — Ч. 1. — 116 с.
- Дрібниця В. О., Загоруй Є. В. Нова історія (кінець ХVIIIст.-1918 р.) [Текст]: навч. посібник для 9-го кл. Суми : [б.в.], 1996. — 111 с.
- Дрібниця В. О. Всесвітня історія [Текст] : посібник з всесвітньої історії для вчителів та учнів 8 кл. — К., 1997.
- Дрібниця В. О. Нова історія (XVI- кінець XVIII століття) — [Б. м.] : [б.в.], 1997. — 127 с.
- Дрібниця В. О. Всесвітня історія. Нова історія (XVI - кінець XVIII ст.) [Текст] : підруч. для 8 класу — К. : А.С.К. : Дієз-продукт, 1998. — 224 с. ISBN 966-539-112-7
- Історія України (від найдавніших часів до початку ХХ століття): Екзаменаційні білети: запитання та відповіді [Текст]: посібник для підгот. до іспитів з історії України учнів 9 кл. серед. загальноосвіт. навч.-виховних закл., ліцеїв та гімназій всіх типів у 1999 році / авт.-упоряд. В. О. Дрібниця. — К. : Дієз-Продукт, 1999. — 63 с.ISBN 966-954-872-1
- Історія України та всесвітня історія ХХ століття: Екзаменаційні білети: запитання та відповіді [Текст] : посібник для підгот. до вип. іспитів з історії учнів 11 кл. серед. шк. і випускників загальноосвіт. навч.-вих. закл., ліцеїв та гімназій всіх типів у 1999 році / авт.-упоряд. В. О. Дрібниця. — К. : Дієз-Продукт, 1999. — 95 с.ISBN 966-954-871-3
- Дрібниця В. О. Всесвітня історія. Нова історія [Текст] : посібник для 9 кл. / авт.- упоряд. В. О. Дрібниця. — К. : Фаренгейт, 1999 . Ч. 2 : Кінець XVIII - початок ХХ століття. — К. : [б.в.], 1999. — 219 с.ISBN 966-954-879-9
- Дрібниця В. О. Всесвітня історія [Текст]; Нова історія (XVI - кінець XVIII століття) / В. О. Дрібниця, В. В. Крижанівська. — К. : Компанія "Дієз-продукт", 1999. — 224 с.ISBN 966-954-870-5
- Голованов С. О., Дрібниця В. О. Всесвітня історія. Історія стародавнього світу [Текст] : посіб. для 6 кл. / С. О. Голованов, В. О. Дрібниця. — К. : Фаренгейт, 1999. — 271 с.:іл. ISBN 966-954-873-X
- Дрібниця В. О. Історія України (від найдавніших часів до початку ХХ століття) [Текст] : посібник для учнів 9-х класів шкіл, ліцеїв та гімназій до екзаменів у 2000 році: Екзаменаційні білети: Історія України. — К. : Фаренгейт, 2000. — 64 с.
- Дрібниця В. О. Всесвітня історія [Текст] ; Нова історія (XVI - кінець XVIII століття) / В. О. Дрібниця, В. В. Крижанівська. — К.: А.С.К.: Фаренгейт, 2000. — 221 с. ISBN 966-539-112-7
- Дрібниця В. О. Історія України ХХ століття: Зразки відповідей на питання екзаменаційних білетів [Текст]: посіб. для уч. 11 кл. шкіл, випускників ліцеїв та гімназій відповідно до держ. підсумкової атестації у 2001 навч. році за 12-бальною системою оцінювання навч. досягнень / В. О. Дрібниця. — К. : Фаренгейт, 2001. — 124 с. ISBN 966-776-403-6
- Дрібниця В. О. Всесвітня історія. Нова історія (ХVІ- кінець ХVІІІ століття) [Текст] : підруч. для 8 кл. / В. О. Дрібниця, В. В. Крижанівська. — К. : Фаренгейт, 2001. — 256 с. ISBN 966-776-419-2
- Дрібниця В. О. Історія України XX століття [Текст] : посібник для уч. 11 кл. загальноосвіт. шкіл, випускників ліцеїв та гімназій відповідно до держ. підсумкової атестації у 2002 навч. році: Зразки відповідей на питання екзаменаційних білетів / В. О. Дрібниця. — К. : Фаренгейт, 2002. — 128 с. ISBN 966-776-421-4
- Дрібниця В. О. Історія України ХХ століття [Текст] : посіб. для випускників шкіл, ліцеїв та гімназій, абітурієнтів вищ. навч. закладів: Зразки відповідей на питання держ. підсумкової атестації: На допомогу абутурієнту / В. О. Дрібниця. — К. : Фаренгейт : Дієз-продукт, 2003. — 128 с.
- CD-ROM: Історія України, 11 клас. — К.: Фаренгейт, 2004. (Член авторського колективу електронного проекту).
- Дрібниця В. О. Історія України ХХ століття: Посібник для випускників шкіл, ліцеїв та гімназій, абітурієнтів вищих навчальних закладів. — К.: Дієз-продукт, 2004. — 132 с.
- Дрібниця В. О. Історична інформація в мережі Інтернет // Комп'ютер у школі та сім'ї. — 2004. — № 1.
- Дрібниця В. О. Всесвітня історія XX століття: Посібник для випускників шкіл, ліцеїв та гімназій, абітурієнтів вищих навчальних закладів. — К.: Дієз-продукт, 2004. — 80 с.
- Дрібниця В. О. Електронний підручник — сучасний засіб навчання // Історія в школі. — 2004. — № 2.
- Дрібниця В. О. Електронний підручник з історії для 11-го класу // Комп'ютер у школі та сім'ї. — 2004. — № 3.
- Дрібниця В. О. Електронний підручник — сучасний засіб навчання // Історія України. — 2004. — № 14.
- Дрібниця В. О. Історія України XX—XXI ст.: Посібник для випускників шкіл, ліцеїв та гімназій, абітурієнтів вищих навчальних закладів. — К.: Дієз-продукт, 2005. — 128 с.
- Дрібниця І., Дрібниця В. До джерел землеробства. Конспект уроку з використанням комп'ютерної програми «Трипільська культура». Історія України, 7 клас // Історія в школах України. — 2005. — № 3.
- Дрібниця В. Використання комп'ютера на уроках суспільно-гуманітарних дисциплін // Історія та правознавство. — 2005. — № 14 (42).
- Дрібниця В. «Геть від Москви!..» (Таки був правий Микола Хвильовий) // Історія України. — 2005. — № 18 (418).
- Дрібниця І., Дрібниця В. Розробка уроку з історії України за темою «Найдавніші землероби і скотарі» з використанням комп'ютерної програми «Трипільська культура». 7 клас // Історія та правознавство. — 2005. — № 16—18. — С. 3—33.
- Дрібниця В. О. Чи «паралельний» цей світ? (рецензія на видання «Нариси історії середньовічної та ранньомодерної України» Н. Яковенко) // Історія в школі. — 2006. — № 1.
- Дрібниця В. О. Історія України XX—XXI століття. Запитання та відповіді. — К.: Дієз-продукт, 2006.
- Дрібниця В. О. Впровадження курсу «Основні методологічні підходи до змісту історичної освіти» в процес підвищення кваліфікації вчителів суспільствознавчих дисциплін // Вісник післядипломної освіти: Збірник наукових праць. — Випуск 3 / Ред. кол.: В. В. Олійник (гол. ред.) та ін. — К.: Міленіум, 2006. — С. 82—92.
- Дрібниця В. О. Чи «паралельний» цей світ? (рецензія на видання «Нариси історії середньовічної та ранньомодерної України» Н. Яковенко) // Історія та правознавство. — 2006. — № 11.
- Дрібниця В. Основні вимоги до складання плану. Поради учасникам олімпіади з історії // Історія України. — 2006. — № 45.
- Дрібниця В. О. Порівняльний аналіз програмового педагогічного засобу з історії для загальноосвітніх навчальних закладів // Наукова програма та тези доповідей і виступів учасників Всеукраїнської науково-практичної конференції «Проблеми розробки та впровадження комп'ютерно-орієнтованих засобів навчання» 14-15 грудня 2006 року. — Київ-Біла Церква, 2006.
- Дрібниця В. О. Історія України XX—XXI ст.: Посібник для випускників шкіл, ліцеїв та гімназій, абітурієнтів вищих навчальних закладів. — К.: Дієз-продукт, 2007.
- Всесвітня історія. 8 клас (1998—2003 рр., разом із Крижановською В. В.).
- Історія України: підруч. для 7 кл. закладів загальної середньої освіти / В. О. Дрібниця, І.Я Щупак, О. В. Бурлака, І. О. Піскарьова. — Київ: УОВЦ «Оріон», 2020. — 176 с.: іл. ISBN 978-966-991-039-4
- Історія України: робочий зошит для 7 кл. закладів загальної середньої освіти: практичні роботи, дослідницькі вправи, компетентісні завдання / І. Я. Щупак, В. О. Дрібниця, О. В. Бурлака, І. О. Піскарьова. — Київ: УОВЦ «Оріон», 2021. — 80 с. : іл. ISBN 978-966-991-055-4
- Щупак І. Я., Бурлака О. В., Дрібниця В. О., Желіба О. В., Піскарьова І. О. Історія України: підруч. для 7 кл. закладів загальної середньої освіти / Київ: УОВЦ «Оріон», 2024, 192 с. : іл. ISBN 978-966-991-295-4
- Дрібниця В. О. Всесвітня історія: робочий зошит. Навчальний посібник для 6 класу закладів загальної середньої освіти / Київ: УОВЦ «Оріон», 2024. — 96 с. : іл. ISBN 978-966-991-353-1
- Дрібниця І. В., Дрібниця В. О. Історія України. Середні віки (IV — кінець XV ст.): робочий зошит для самостійної роботи. Навчальний посібник для 7 класу закладів загальної середньої освіти / Київ: УОВЦ «Оріон», 2024. — 96 с. : ISBN 978-966-991-354-8
- Дрібниця І. В., Дрібниця В. О. Всесвітня історія. Епоха Середніх віків (IV — кінець XV ст.): робочий зошит для самостійної роботи. Навчальний посібник для 7 класу закладів загальної середньої освіти / Київ: УОВЦ «Оріон», 2024. — 96 с. : ISBN 978-966-991-355-5
- Щупак І. Я., Старченко Н. П., Бурлака О. В., Власова Н. С, Врадій Є. А., Громенко С. В., Дрібниця В. О., Желіба О. В., Кронгауз В. О., Піскарьова І. О., Секиринський Д. О. Всесвітня історія: підруч. для 8 кл. закладів загальної середньої освіти / Київ: УОВЦ «Оріон», 2025, 187 с. : іл. ISBN 978-966-991-408-8
- Щупак І. Я., Старченко Н. П., Бурлака О. В., Власова Н. С., Галушко К. Ю., Дрібниця В. О., Желіба О. В., Піскарьова І. О., Репан О. А., Секиринський Д. О., Черкас Б. В. Історія України: підруч. для 8 кл. закладів загальної середньої освіти / Київ: УОВЦ «Оріон», 2025, 245 с. : іл. ISBN 978-966-991-409-5
