= National Pedagogical Drahomanov University =

University in Kyiv, Ukraine

Coordinates: 50°26′41″N 30°30′25″E

Dragomanov Ukrainian State University
- Український державний університет імені Михайла Драгоманова
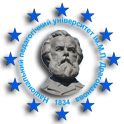
- Motto: Liber – a central figura
- Established: 1834; 192 years ago
- Affiliations: Ministry of Education and Science of Ukraine
- Rector: Viktor Petrovych Andrushchenko
- Students: ~36000
- Location: Pyrohova St, 9, Kyiv, Lubny, 01601, Ukraine
- Campus: Prague, Czech Republic
- Website: www.npu.edu.ua
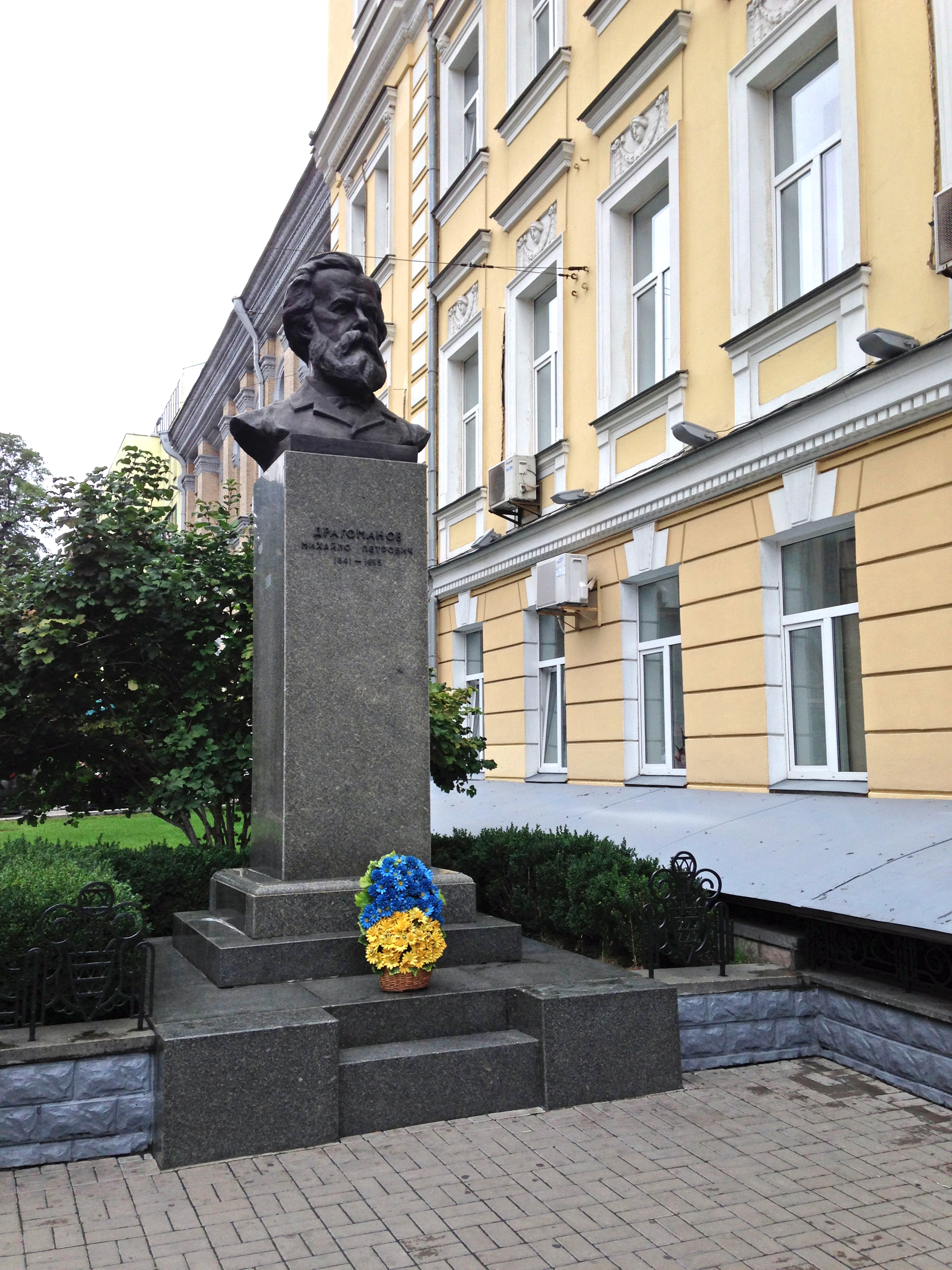

The Drahomanov Ukrainian State University is a Ukrainian higher education institution in Kyiv, which has a III-IV accreditation level. It is named after Mykhailo Drahomanov.

== History ==
1834 – Pedagogical Institute – the future National Pedagogical Drahomanov University – started as a branch of the Imperial St. Vladimir University.

1920 – Kyiv administration of high schools decided to create, on the basis of the aforementioned branch of St. Vladimir University and the Higher education courses for women, the Kyiv Higher Institute of Education.

1933 – Kyiv Pedagogical Institute.

1936 – Kyiv Pedagogical Institute named after A. M. Gorky

1991 – Kyiv Pedagogical Drahomanov Institute.

1993 – Kyiv State Drahomanov University.

1997 – National Pedagogical Drahomanov University

2015 – The university celebrated the 180th anniversary of its existence in April

2023 – Drahomanov Ukrainian State University

== Campuses and buildings ==
The university has six academic buildings, a library with 8 reading rooms, 7 dormitories, a sports complex with a swimming pool, computer classes, internet cafes, buffets and dining areas.

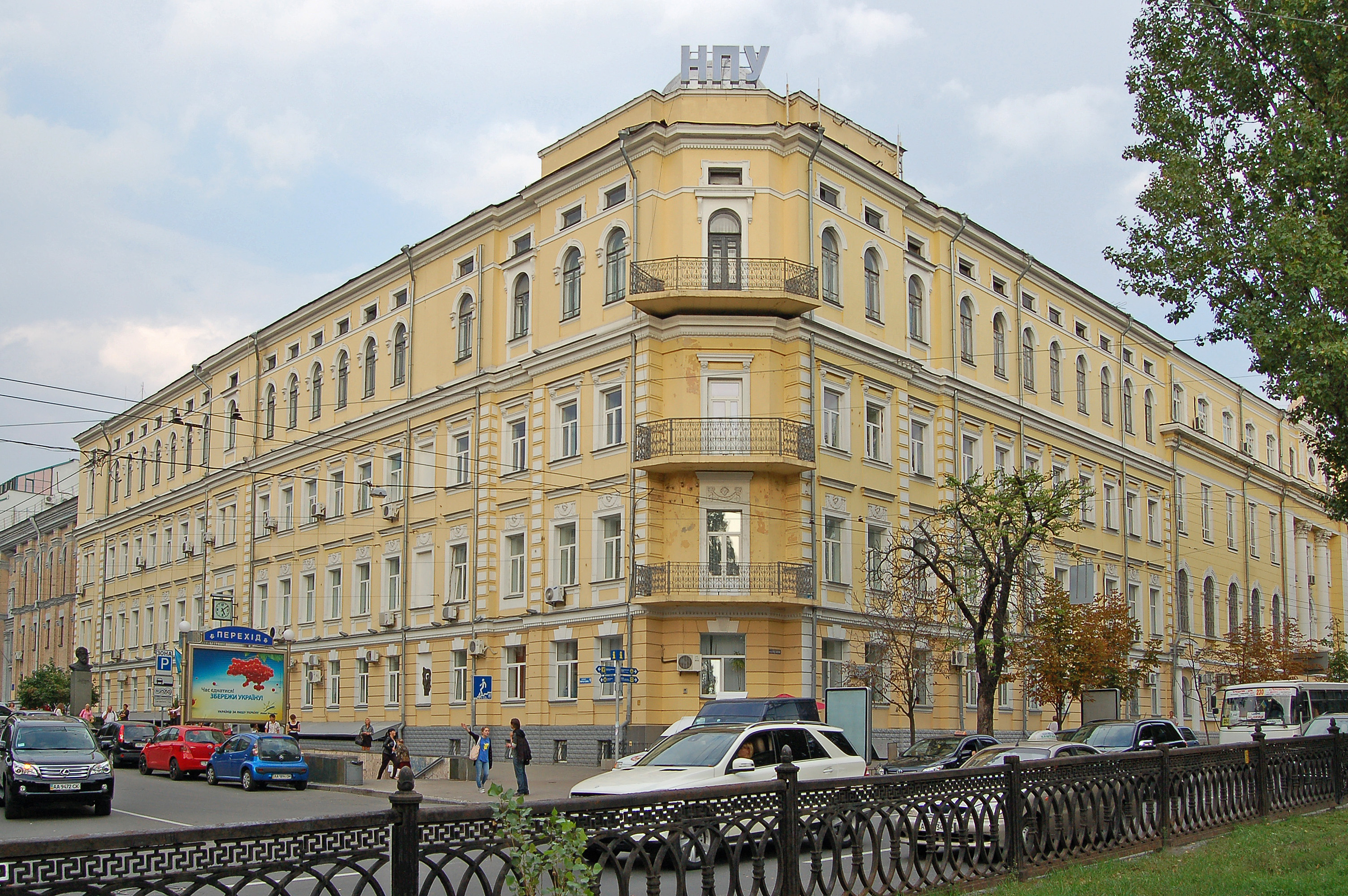
Main building

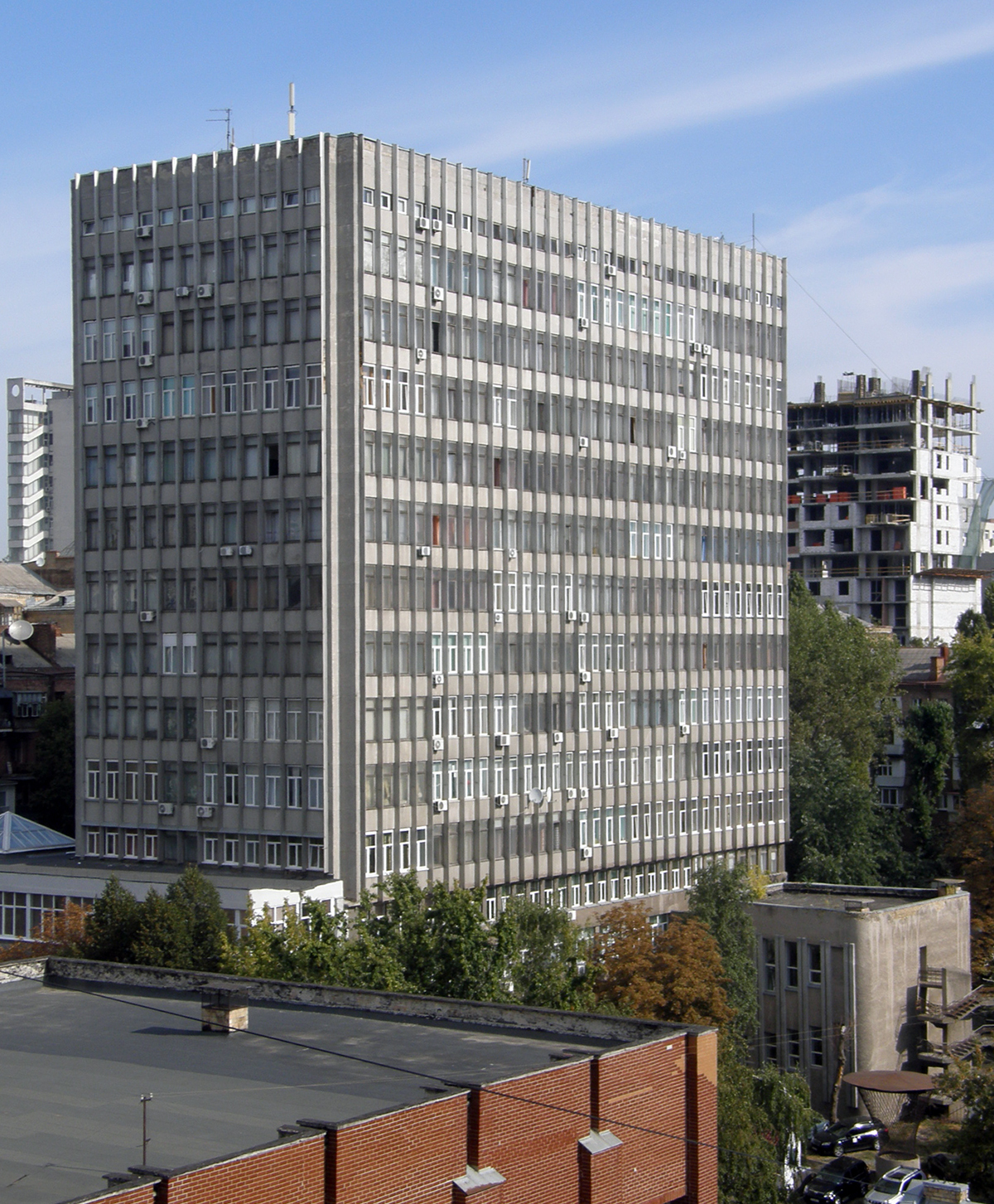
Building of the humanities

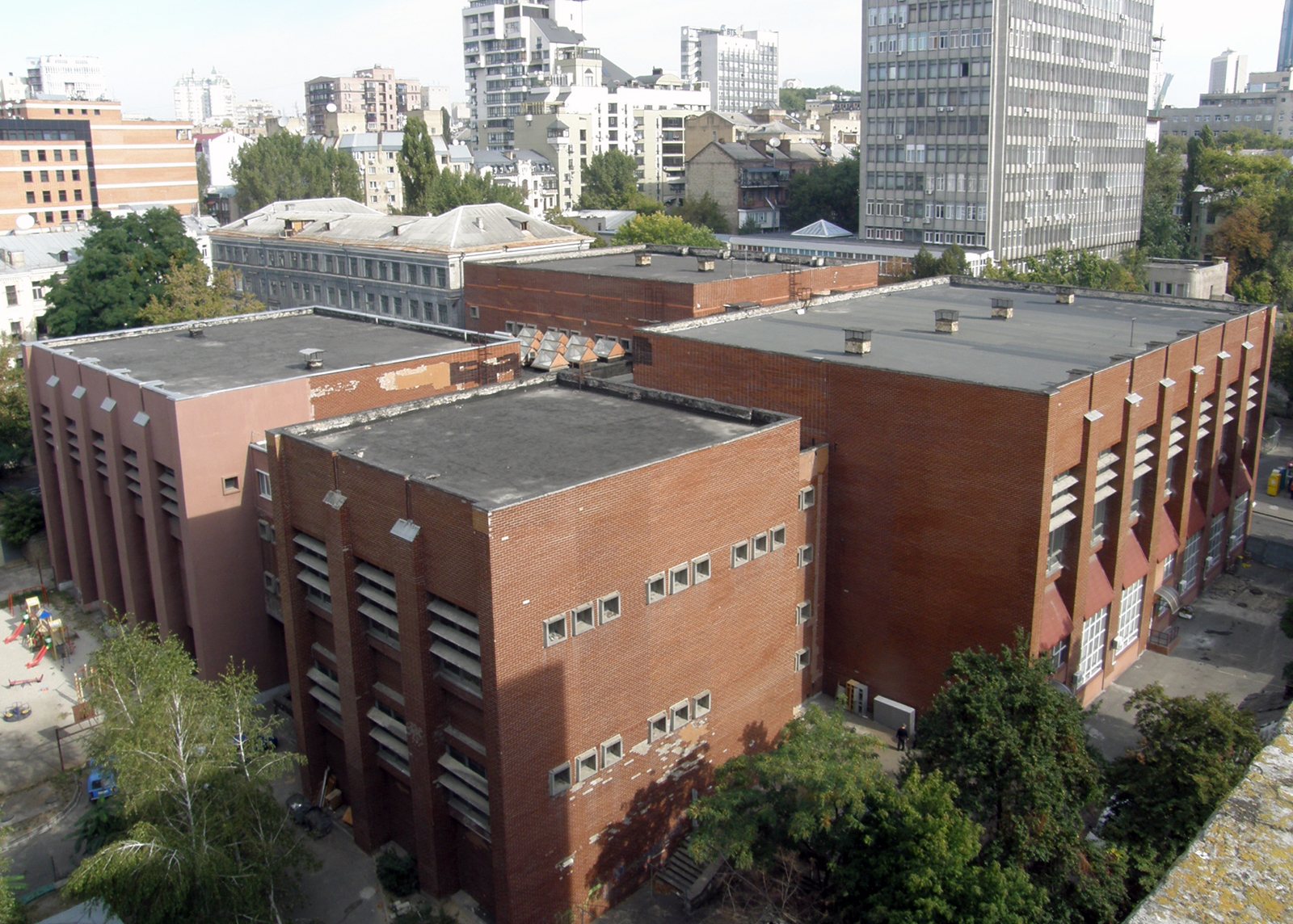
Sports complex

== List of faculties and institutes ==
=== Faculty of Engineering Education ===
Dean – Doctor of Pedagogical Sciences, professor Dmytro Kilderov. Faculty trains teachers of vocational education, drawing and craft, experts in information technologies, interior design, fashion design, small business management and auto transport. Since January 2016 the name has been changed to Faculty of Engineering Education.

=== Faculty of Foreign Philology ===
Dean – Doctor of Philological Sciences, PhD in Pedagogical Sciences, professor Alla Zernetska. Faculty, which was founded in 2003, provides training of specialists in English, French, German, Italian, Spanish, Polish, Russian, Japanese, Arabic, Chinese and Turkish languages and literature.

=== Faculty of Computer Science ===
Dean – PhD in Pedagogical Sciences, professor Vasyl Yefimenko. Historical background of the Faculty of Computer Science (former Institute of Informatics) goes back to the end of 1950s – beginning of 1960s, when studying of elements of cybernetics and basics of programming in the higher educational institutions in Ukraine began. As an independent unit, Institute was established in 2008 as a result of reorganization of the Institute of Physics and Mathematics and Informatics Education. Then it was renamed to Faculty of Computer Science. The main task of this faculty is to train teachers of computer science and economics.

=== Faculty of History ===
Dean – Doctor of Historical Sciences, professor Volodymyr Borysenko. During the last 30 years, Faculty of History (former Institute of Historic Education) trains teachers for secondary schools, specialized humanitarian institutions, university teachers and researchers of academic and specialized research institutions. Education within the faculty allows specialists to work as school teachers, work in archives and museums, government, political and social organizations and other educational and tourist institutions.

=== Faculty of Psychology ===
Dean – Doctor of Psychological Sciences, Honored Worker of Science and Technology of Ukraine, professor Irina Bulakh. Defectology department is one of the oldest departments of the university – it operates since 1920. In 2003 on its base the Institute for Special Education and Psychology was founded, which consisted of five departments: speech therapy, correctional psychopedagogy, sign language, blindness and education, special psychology and medicine. The institute has two scientific-methodical centres: rehabilitation of the disabled and inclusive education. Later on, it was renamed to Faculty of Psychology.

=== Faculty of Education and Science Management ===
Dean – Doctor of Historical Sciences, Laureate of the State Prize of Ukraine in the field of education, Professor Volodymyr Saveliev. As an independent unit, faculty was established in 2018. Specialists are trained at the bachelor's degree for the following educational programs: "Management", "Management of socio-cultural activities", "Documentation of information activities in the field of education", "Documentary and information support of personnel work", "Leisure pedagogy". According to the master's degree, the Faculty of Education and Science Management offers the following educational programs: "Higher School Pedagogy", "Public Administration in the Field of Education", "International Education", "Educational Policy", "Pedagogical Advising"; "State educational policy", "Management of socio-cultural activities", "Management", "Administrative management", "Management of educational institutions", "Knowledge management", "Project management", "Management of international educational activities", "Personnel management", "Management of public organizations", "Management of innovations in education", "Innovative management of an inclusive environment", "System analysis in management", "Analytics in management".

=== Anatolii Avdiievsky Faculty of Arts ===
Dean – Honored Artist of Ukraine, Doctor of Pedagogical Sciences, professor Vasyl Fedoryshyn. Training of students is conducted in the following specialties: music art and choreography. In the future, faculty plans to introduce new specialties, namely: organizer and psychologist of musical leisure of youth, sound specialist in musical acoustics, music director of children's and youth programs on radio and television, sound director, accompanist, concert performer, artist-singer (soloist), performer of pop and folk songs, arranger, music manager, organizer of musical education.

=== Faculty of Pedagogics and Psychology ===
Dean – Doctor of Pedagogical Sciences, professor Taras Olefirenko. Institute trains specialists in the following specialties: applied psychology, human's health, fine arts and elementary education. For students, there are choir, literature studio, workshops on painting, sculpture, decorative arts, history museum of fine arts, permanent exhibition of students' artwork.

=== Faculty of Natural and Geographical Education and Ecology ===
Dean – PhD in Pedagogical Sciences, professor Hanna Turchinova. Natural sciences were studied at the university since the beginning of its operation in the status of Pedagogical Institute (1834). Intensive training of teachers of chemistry, biology and geography began in the 1920s. In 1933, biological and geographical divisions were opened, which were later reorganized as Biology and Chemistry and Geography Departments. In 1972, on their basis, a natural geography faculty was established. As an independent unit, Institute of Natural and Geographical Education and Ecology functions since 2003. Recently it was renamed to Faculty of National and Geographical Education and Ecology.

=== Faculty of Political Science and Law ===
Dean – Doctor of Historical Sciences, professor Bogdan Andrusyshyn. Holistic training of lawyers and political scientists at the university began in 1992, in the structure of the newly formed social and humanities faculty. Before that, it was held within the specialization in the history faculty. In 2005, on the basis of social and humanities faculty an Institute of Politology and Law was organized, which was renamed to Faculty of Political Science and Law.

=== Faculty of Socioeconomic Education ===
Dean – Academician of the National Academy of Sciences of Ukraine, Soctor of Historical Sciences, professor Volodymyr Yevtukh. Studying of sociology started at the university in the mid-1990s. As an academic subject it was formed at the Department of Political Science and Sociology and the Faculty of Humanities. In 2007, an Institute of Sociology, Psychology and Management was established at the university, which trains specialists in such specialties: sociology, psychology, management of organizations, administrative management, school management, pedagogy of higher schools and others. Institute consists of the next departments: theory and methodology of sociology, theory and counselling psychology, management and European integration, history of educational systems and technologies and applied psychology and psychotherapy.

=== Faculty of Ukrainian Philology ===
Dean – PhD in Philological Science, professor Anatoly Vysotsky. Training of teachers of Ukrainian language and literature at the university is conducted since the 1920s. As an independent academic unit, Institute functions since 2003. Training of specialists conducted in the following specialties: philology, publishing, Ukrainian language and literature, publishing and editing. Recently, the name was changed to Faculty of Ukrainian Philology.

=== Faculty of Physical Education, Health and Sport ===
Dean – Doctor of Pedagogical Sciences, professor Oleksii Tymoshenko. Training at the faculty is conducted in the following specialties: physical education (football, tourism, practical psychology), human's health (adaptive physical education, fitness), sports (management, security business). In 1985, to improve the quality of the educational process a new sports building with total area of 8400 square meters was established.

=== Faculty of Physics and Mathematics ===
Dean – Doctor of Physical and Mathematical sciences, professor Mykola Pratsyovity. Training of teachers of mathematics and physics was conducted since the foundation of the institute, at first at the school faculty, then – at the faculty of social education. As a structural subdivision, department of physics and mathematics was created in 1934–1935, as a separate faculty – in 2006.

=== Faculty of Philosophy and Social Sciences ===
Dean – Doctor of Historical Sciences, professor Ivan Drobot. Philosophical training of teachers was conducted since the founding of the Pedagogical Institute in the structure of the St. Volodymyr University. It was provided by a series of philosophical departments, staffed by outstanding scholars and teachers, in particular, O.Novitsky etc. In the second half of the 20th century, Department of Philosophy of the Pedagogical Institute, and later of the university was headed by Prof. O.Pavelko, later – by Prof. G.Volynka. As an independent unit in the university, faculty was founded in 2004. There are 8 departments that conduct training of specialists in the following specialties: philosophy, cultural studies, design, advertising and public relations.

=== Faculty of Special and Inclusive Education ===
Dean - Doctor of Pedagogical Sciences, Honorary Member of the National Academy of Pedagogical Sciences of Ukraine, professor Maria Sheremet. The faculty trains special education teachers (defectologists) and special (clinical) psychologists.

=== Institute of Retraining and Further Training of teachers ===
Director – Honored Worker of Education of Ukraine, Doctor of Pedagogical Sciences, professor Volodymyr Serhiienko. The institute was established in June 2008 with a view to improving the process of retraining and skills development for all specialties, which are taught at the university. This division is the successor to the faculty of retraining, which existed at the university since 1974. The institute provides professional training in 11 specialties and provides an opportunity to obtain a second higher education. Now about 1000 students are enrolled in the institute.

== Honorary doctors, professors and notable alumni ==
- Nina Andriievska - composer, journalist and musicologist
- Roman Bezsmertnyi – politician, former Deputy Prime Minister of Ukraine.
- Oksana Bayrak – Ukrainian film director
- Olexandr Reyent – researcher of history of Ukraine in the 19th and 20th centuries
- Augusta Goldberg – first Doctor of Psychology in Ukraine
- Viktor Synyov – a Ukrainian scientist in the field of Special Education, legal and special psychology
- Vitali Klitschko – politician and professional boxer
- Wladimir Klitschko – professional boxer
- Leonid Kravchuk, former President of Ukraine
- Viktor Yushchenko, former President of Ukraine
- Rudolf Schuster, former President of Slovakia
- Evhen Bereznyak "Major Vyhr" – Hero of Ukraine, the savior of Kraków
- Hansjürgen Doss, former member of German parliament
- Moritz Hunzinger, German business leader
- Nadiya Kudelia – Ukrainian coloratura soprano singer
- Adalbert H. Lhota, former honorary consul general of Austria
- Axel Haas, Managing Partner of Arend Prozessautomation
- Alexander Sparinsky, Ukrainian composer, producer and musicologist
- Epiphanius, Metropolitan of Kyiv and All Ukraine
- Carlos Evaristo, Portuguese historian
- Vitalii Dribnytsia, historian, history teacher, co-author of school books and YouTuber

== Awards and reputation ==
According to the "Dengi" magazine, National Pedagogical Drahomanov University occupies fifth place in the ranking of Employers of Ukraine.

== See also ==
List of universities in Ukraine
