= Foxtrot (Ukrainian retailer) =

FTD-Retail, LLC
- Logo since 2019
- Trade name: Foxtrot
- Native name: ТОВ "ФТД-РИТЕЙЛ"
- Romanized name: Fokstrot
- Formerly: SAV-Distribution, LLC; Foxtrot equipment for the home, LLC
- Company type: Private
- Industry: Retail
- Founded: September 1, 1994; 31 years ago
- Headquarters: 04112 Dorohozhytska vulytsia, Kyiv, Ukraine
- Key people: Oleksii Zozulia (CEO)
- Products: Consumer electronics, appliances
- Number of employees: 4,600 (2021)
- Parent: Foxtrot Group
- Website: foxtrot.com.ua

Foxtrot (legally FTD-Retail, LLC) is a Ukrainian chain of electronics and home appliances stores.

Foxtrot's revenue in 2018 amounted to ₴12.2 billion, and net profit was ₴84 million. At the end of 2018, the Foxtrot network took the sixth place among Ukrainian retail chains and 76th place in the rating of the largest Ukrainian companies.

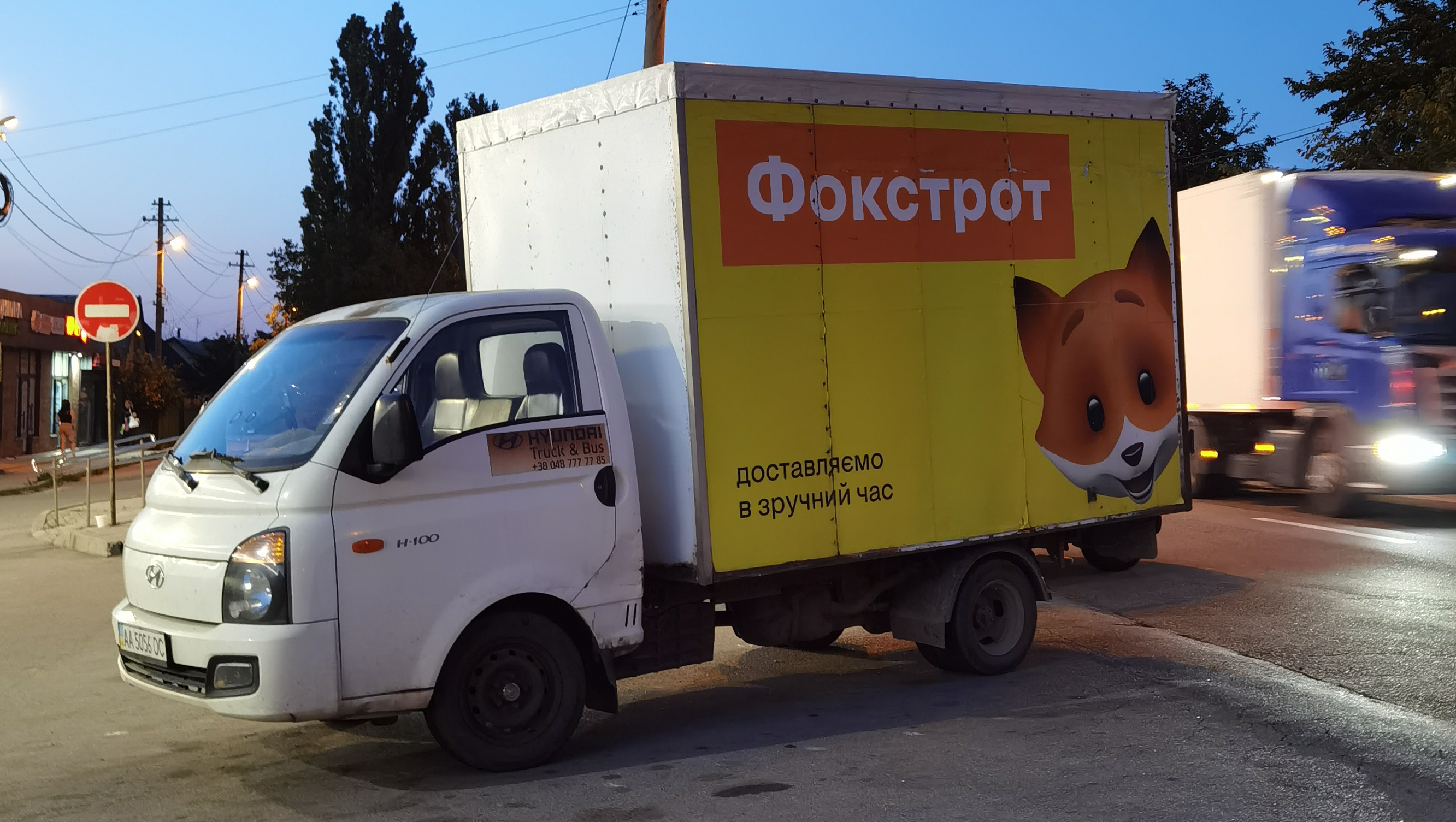
Foxtrot delivery truck

Since 2010 Foxtrot is the only Ukrainian member of Euronics — an international association of independent electrical retailers.

Founders of the company: Hennadiy Vykhodtsev and Valerii Makovetskyi.

In 2020 Foxtrot became one of the top 25 most successful Ukrainian brands.
