= Anton Sova =

Swedish talent executive, artist manager, A&R professional, and entrepreneur

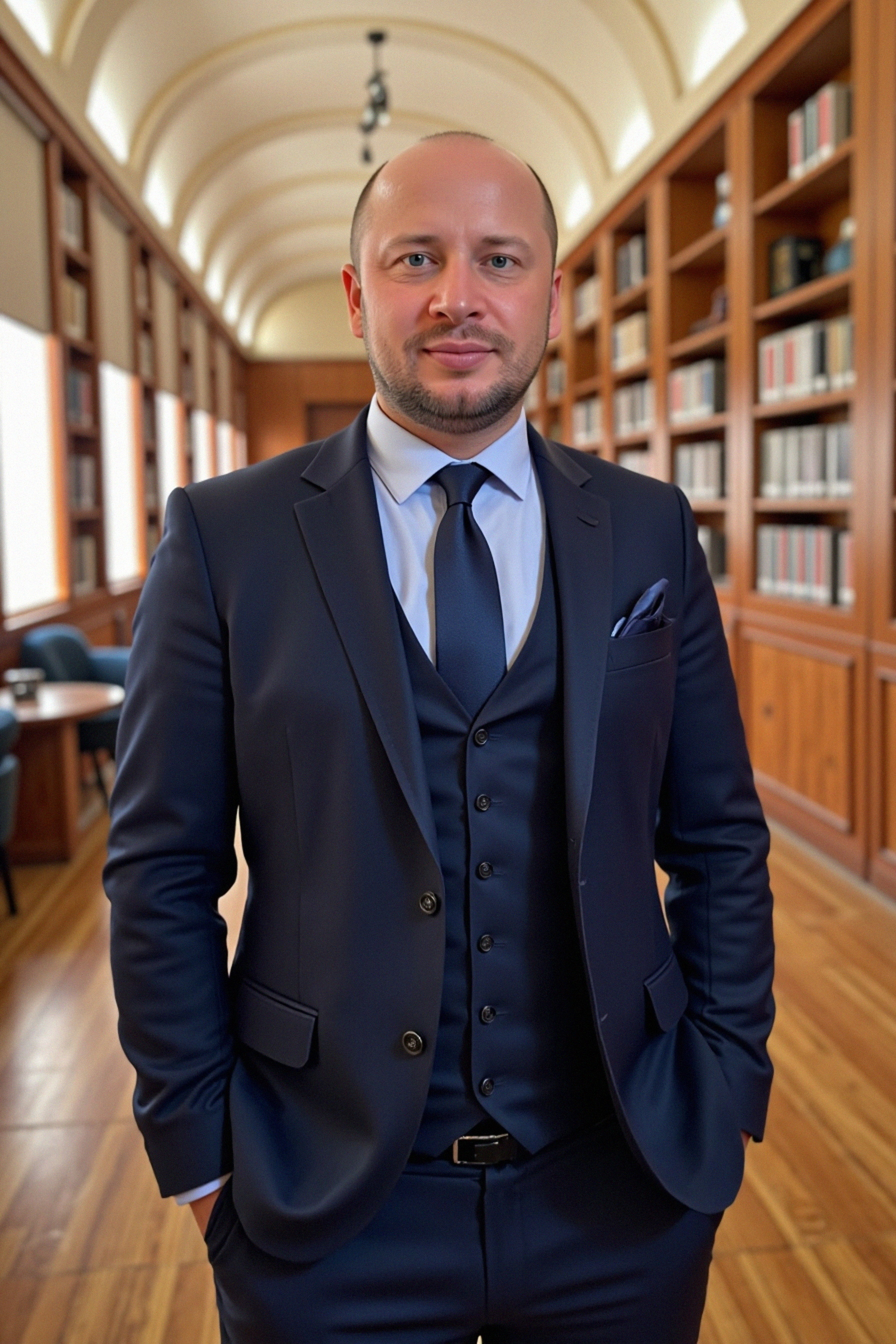
- Official portrait, 2021
- Born: Anton Carl Gustaf von Essen; 26 June 1981 (age 45); Kyiv, Ukrainian Soviet Socialist Republic, Soviet Union
- Other name: Anton Sova
- Education: Kyiv Slavonic University, National University of Life and Environmental Sciences of Ukraine, Dalarna University College, Stockholm University
- Occupations: Music manager; Talent manager; Entrepreneur; A&R; Artist manager; Film producer; Record executive; Music publisher; Business Man; Sports agent; Impresario
- Years active: 1996–present
- Known for: Founder and CEO of TUARON
- Website: www.antonsova.com

Signature
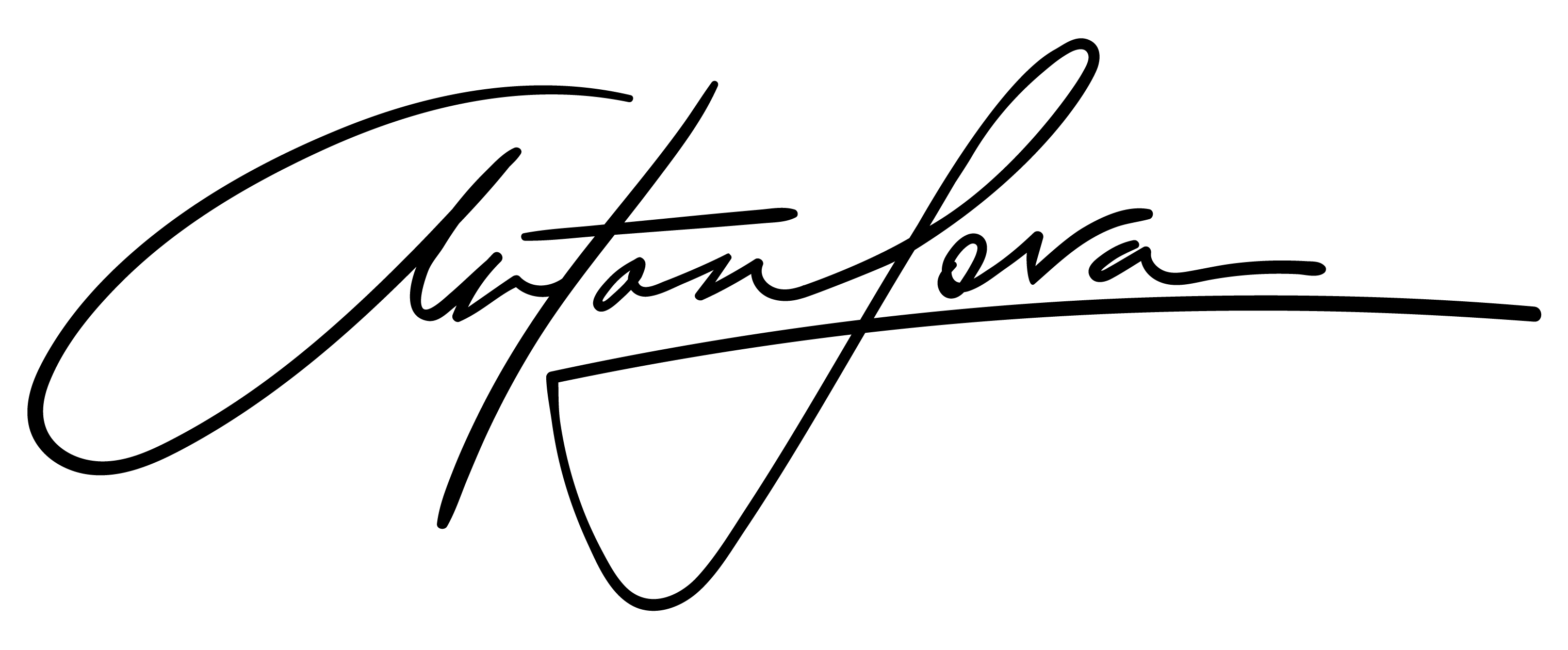

Anton Carl Gustaf von Essen (born June 26, 1981), known professionally as Anton Sova, is a Swedish talent manager, music entrepreneur, film producer, business manager, artist developer, and A&R executive.

== Biography ==
Anton Sova was born to Ukrainian parents, Mykola and Mariia, and grew up in Kyiv with his older brother.

He graduated from Gymnasium No. 264 in Kyiv in 1998 and studied at Kyiv Slavonic University's Faculty of Economics from 1998 to 2003.

Starting in 1999, he adopted the pseudonym Anton Sova.

From 2001 to 2003, Anton Sova underwent military training at the military department of the National University of Life and Environmental Sciences of Ukraine, achieving the rank of reserve lieutenant on March 9, 2004.

He subsequently attended Kyiv University of Culture, studying in the department for mass festival direction from 2003 to 2004.

Anton Sova became a permanent resident of Riga on June 22, 2010, where he worked as an A&R manager.

In 2011, he resumed his studies in Sweden, studying Slavic and Baltic languages at Dalarna University in 2014, and continuing at Stockholm University from 2015.

== Career ==
Anton Sova started working in 1996 as an advertising agent for a newspaper. In 1999, he founded the global talent agency TUARON, where he has held the position of chairman since its inception.

Anton Sova has been actively involved in discovering and managing a range of artists, including Tatjana Shirko and Stas Shurin, who won the Ukrainian "Star Academy", Fabryka Zirok 2010.

One of his initial projects was the formation of the music group Cherry, also known as Adamants, in 2003. By 2006, Anton had established collaborations with various Ukrainian artists, including Artur Bosso, Tatjana Shirko, Anna Mukhina, Andrew Boldar, the Freakballet show group, and the rock band Platinum.

Since 2008, Anton Sova has been active in Latvia, where he conducted auditions for Latvian artists and musicians, establishing collaborations with figures such as Alekss Silvers, Andrey Klad, Stas Shurin, and Gatis Timofeev. He also produced recordings with artists including Alex Luna, KAL1BR, Marco Giacomo, Daiga Berzina, and the rock band Luv Land.

On April 20, 2013, he introduced the Swedish pop group Dildorado to the Latvian audience, with support from the Swedish Embassy in Latvia.

In 2019, Anton Sova's grandfather, Kasyan Yevchenko, a renowned Ukrainian musician and master of folk instruments, passed away. Yevchenko was also a leader of ensembles and a soloist with the Veryovka Ukrainian Folk Choir. Following his grandfather's death, Anton Sova has continued to support and preserve his artistic legacy, handling organizational matters, protecting copyrights, and collaborating with the music school and museum named in his grandfather's honor.

In 2021, Anton Sova, together with Ukrainian film producer Mila Andriiash, presented the short war drama "God Will Forgive."

Anton Sova is a member of Music Managers Forum Sweden (MFF), an organization for Swedish music managers, A&R professionals, and talent scouts. He is also a member of the Swedish Performing Rights Society (STIM).

== Filmography ==
=== Producer ===
- 2021 – God Will Forgive

== Awards and honors ==
- 2023 Best Producer for God Will Forgive, Dresden Cinema Awards.
- 2023 Best Producer for God Will Forgive, Navy International Film Festival.

== Judge ==
Anton Sova functions as a jury member in numerous talent contests and international events within music and choreography. His jury roles extend to children's festivals such as "SmileFest," "Unison," and "Shlyakhom Mistetsva."

== Personal life ==
From March 2011 until 2015, Anton Sova was married and living in Stockholm. The couple separated at the start of 2015, with their marriage being legally terminated in August 2015. They had no children during their marriage.
