= Urban Rusnák =

Slovak diplomat and academic

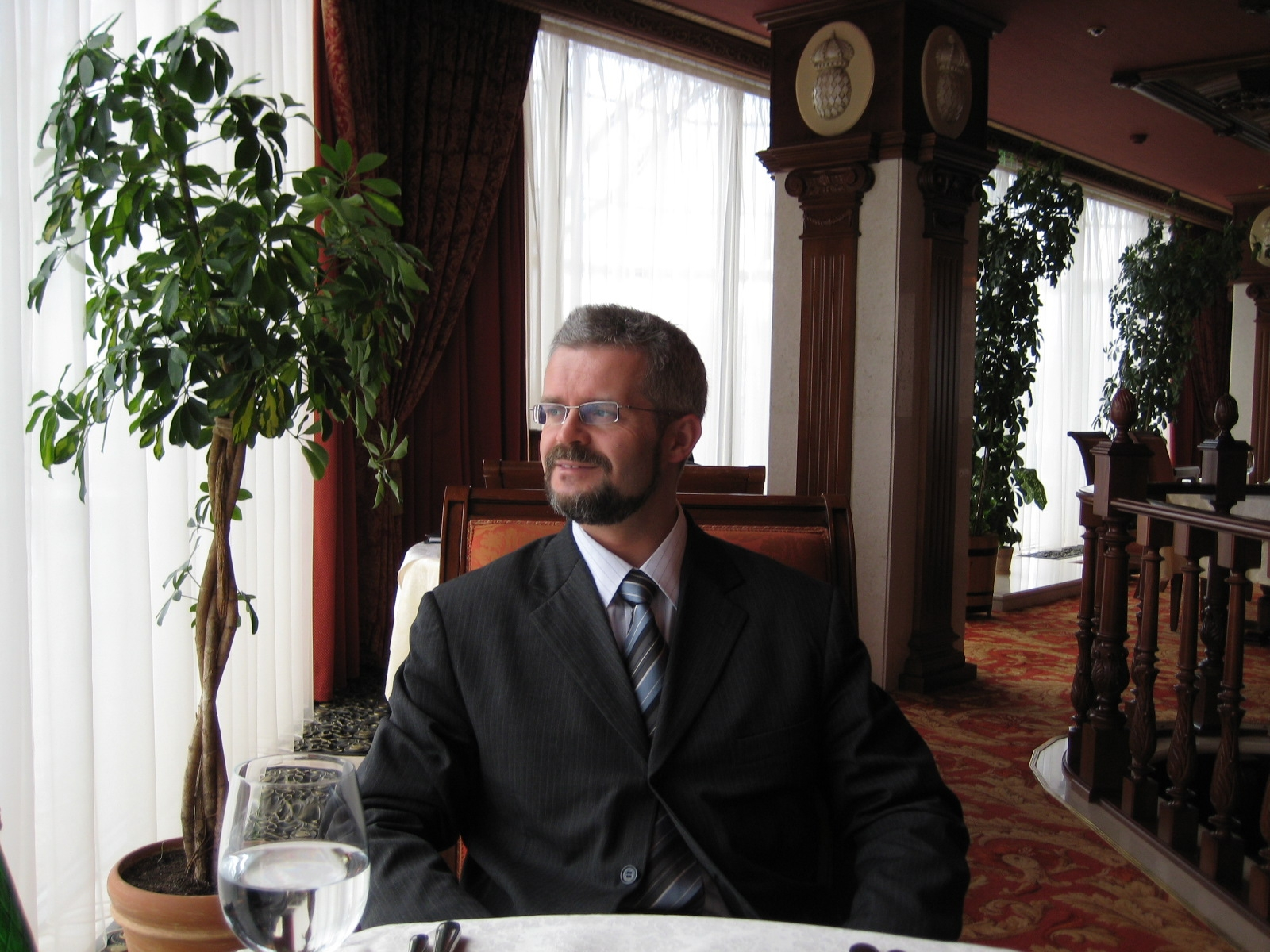

Secretary General of the Energy Charter
- Incumbent
- Assumed office 1 January 2012
- Preceded by: André Mernier

Ambassador of the Slovak Republic to Ukraine
- In office February 2005 – May 2009

Director of the International Visegrad Fund
- In office 2000–2003

Personal details
- Born: 9 September 1967 (age 59) Košice, Czechoslovakia (now Slovakia)
- Spouse: Anar Rusnáková
- Children: 2 sons
- Education: Gubkin Russian State University of Oil and Gas, Ankara University, Kyiv Slavonic University(Honorary Degree)

Urban Rusnák (born 9 September 1967) is a Slovak diplomat and academic. He holds a MSc from the Moscow University of Oil and Gas, and a PhD in Public Administration and Political Sciences from the Institute of Social Sciences of Ankara University. Rusnák wrote his thesis on the Geopolitics of Oil and Gas in the Caspian region.

== Diplomatic service ==
He joined the Czechoslovak foreign ministry and its diplomatic corps in 1992. Following the Velvet Revolution and the breakup of Czechoslovakia in 1993, he decided to stay with the newly formed Slovak Ministry of Foreign Affairs. Soon after he was assigned his first diplomatic mission, in Ankara, Turkey, .

Rusnák was the first Director of the International Visegrad Fund (IVF), a fund supporting in the cultural and political cooperation of the four countries involved in the Visegrád Group. Under his leadership the Fund gained significant recognition in the four respective nations and rapidly increased in size.

Rusnák served as the extraordinary and plenipotentiary ambassador of the Slovak Republic to Ukraine from 2005 to 2009. During his service in Kyiv, he was involved in the resolution of the 2009 Russia–Ukraine gas dispute, which caused a significant disruption of gas deliveries to the eastern countries of the EU such as Slovakia and Bulgaria.

On 29 November 2011, Rusnák was elected as the General Secretary of the Energy Charter Secretariat.

== Academics ==
Rusnák is a lecturer and author of professional articles on the topics of international relations, energy security and development. He was a lecturer at the Kyiv Slavonic University (2005–2009) and at the International Relations Faculty of the University of Economics in Bratislava (2000–2003). He also made guest appearances at University of Wolverhampton and Uzhhorod National University. He was chairman of the editorial board of the Slovak Institute for International Studies (2000–2003), editor in chief for the MFA International Issues Journal (1998–1999) and is on the editorial board of the Slovak Foreign Policy Association. He is author or co-author of several articles such as "Development Assistance and Cooperation".
