= Anders Johansson =

Anders Johansson may refer to:

- Anders Johansson (table tennis) (born 1955), Swedish table tennis player
- Anders Johansson (drummer) (born 1962), Swedish musician, drummer of bands HammerFall and Yngwie Malmsteen's Rising Force
- Anders Johansson (football manager) (born 1967), Swedish football manager
- Anders Johansson (comedian) (born 1972), Swedish comedian, television and radio presenter
- Anders Johansson (artist manager) (born 1973), Swedish artist manager
- Anders Johansson (singer), winner of series Fame Factory
