= Dildorado =

Swedish pop/disco band

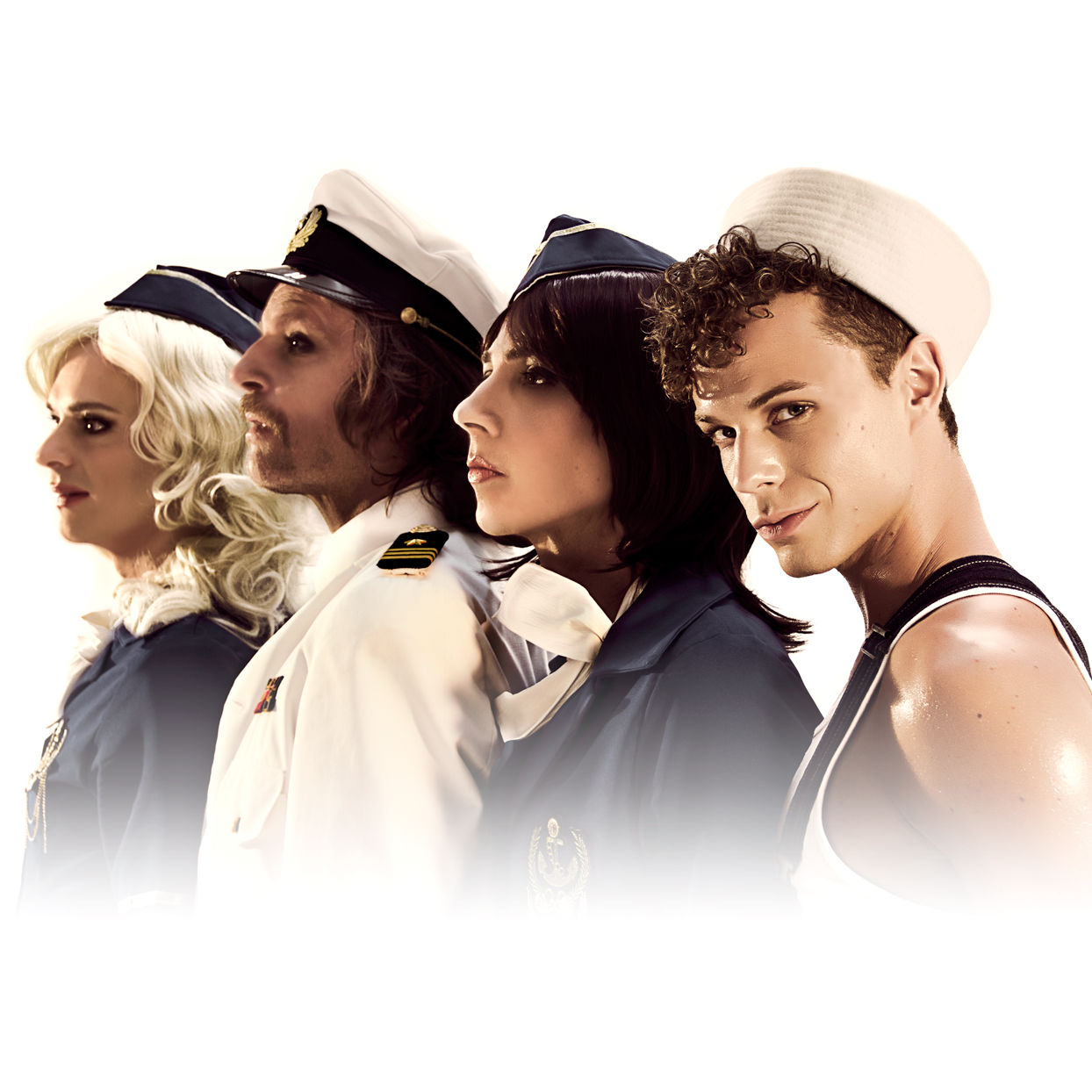

Background information
- Origin: Stockholm, Sweden
- Genres: Pop; europop; disco
- Years active: 2000–present
- Members: Michael Westlund; Edwin von Werder; Jöns Hellsing; Martin Sjögren

Dildorado is a pop band from Stockholm, Sweden, formed in 2000.

== History ==
Dildorado was established in 2000 by three members Captain, Horny & Misty after their performance in Barcelona. Originally, they were known by the name Los Amigos del Toro.

The group's first album was released in 2009. The album included three remixes of Hakan Lidbo's "Sailor boy". It was issued as a limited edition yellow 12-inch vinyl EP.

In 2011, Sailor boy joined the group. His first appearance was singing and acting with Ronald McDonald in "I'm lovin' it" video.

In 2012 the group release a controversial video, accompanied by a song "Sinners in the sun", in which Sailor boy undressed and teased an orthodox priest.

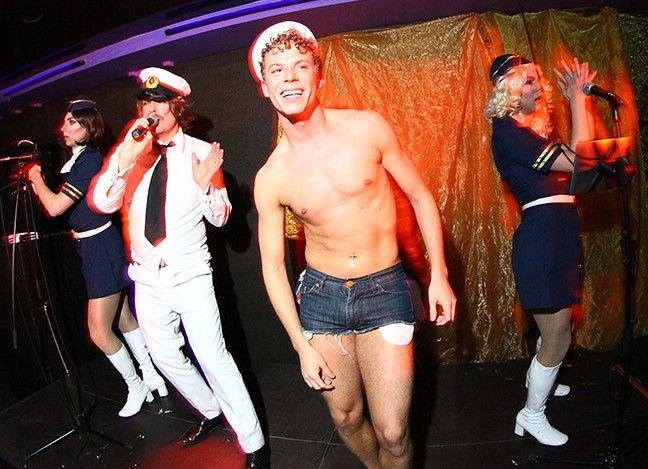
Dildorado performing in Riga, 2013

On 20 April 2013 the Swedish talent manager Anton Sova of the global talent agency TUARON, as part of the support of LGBT culture with the support of the Swedish Embassy in Latvia, presented for the first time the Swedish musical pop band "Dildorado" to perform on the stage of Riga's Golden club-bar at 33/35 Gertrudes Street.

They released a cover of ABBA's song "SOS" in 2013 with its original guitarist Janne Schaffer. The cover was created with permission of ABBA's Benny Andersson.

The group's song ”United fruit” was selected as official song of Stockholm Pride in 2015. In addition to being pride's anthem, the song is a tribute to Stonewall riot.

== Band members ==
- Michael Westlund as Sailor Boy (2011 – present)
- Edwin von Werder as Captain (2000 – present)
- Jöns Hellsing as Misty (2000 – present)
- Martin Sjögren as Horny (2000 – present)

== Discography ==
=== Singles ===
- 2012 — Sailor boy
- 2013 — SOS
- 2015 — United fruit

== Videography ==
- 2011 — I'm lovin' it
- 2012 — Sinners in the sun
- 2015 — United fruit
- 2017 — Push Push
