= Vitaliy Mykhaylovskiy =

Ukrainian historian (born 1974)

- Віталій Михайловський
- Born: Vitalii Mykolaiovych Mykhailovskyi; 10 November 1974 (age 51); Kamianets-Podilskyi, Khmelnytskyi Oblast
- Education: Kamianets-Podilskyi Pedagogical Institute
- Occupation: Historian

Vitaliy Mykhaylovskiy (Ukrainian: Віталій Миколайович Михайловський, romanized: Vitalii Mykolaiovych Mykhailovskyi; born 10 November 1974) is a Ukrainian historian. He earned a Doctor of Historical Science degree in 2013 and became a professor in 2016.

== Biography ==
Vitaliy Mykhaylovskiy was born on 10 November 1974 in Kamianets-Podilskyi, Khmelnytskyi Oblast.

In 1997, he graduated from the Kamianets-Podilskyi Pedagogical Institute. A student of Professor Natalia Yakovenko.

Between 1998 and 2005, Mykhaylovskiy worked at the Association of Ukrainian Writers. From 2005 to 2008, he was employed at Kyiv Slavonic University. Between 2008 and 2010, he worked at the National University of Kyiv-Mohyla Academy. Since 2010, he has been at the Borys Grinchenko Kyiv Metropolitan University, where he became department chair in 2015 and professor of the Department of History of Ukraine in 2016.

Mykhaylovskiy discovered the earliest written mention of Khmelnytskyi in the Central Archives of Historical Records: Ploskyrivtsi, which became the present-day Khmelnytskyi, was granted to Jan Czanstulowski by Polish King Władysław II Jagiełło in the Sopot on 10 February 1431 for one hundred hryvnias. According to Mykhaylovskiy, “This discovery happened quite unexpectedly. A layer of documents of that time was simply lifted".

== Works ==
Mykhaylovskiy's research focuses on the social history of the Ruthenian lands from the late 14th to the 17th centuries, the history of Podillia, parliamentarism in Ukrainian lands from the 14th to the 17th centuries, and the historical geography of Podillia in the 14th to 16th centuries.

Mykhaylovskiy has authored several monographs. These include "Elastychna spilnota. Podilska shliakhta v druhii polovyni XIV — 70-kh rokakh XVI st." (2012), "Prykladom svoikh predkiv... (Vstup) // 'Prykladom svoikh predkiv...'. Istoriia parlamentaryzmu na ukrainskykh zemliakh u 1386–1648 rokakh: Polske korolivstvo ta Rich Pospolyta" (2018, co-authored and edited by Mykhaylovskiy), "Bibliohrafiia parlamentaryzmu na ukrainskykh zemliakh do 1648 roku: Polske korolivstvi, Velyke kniazivstvo Lytovske, Rich Pospolyta" (2018), and "European Expansion and the Contested Borderlands of Late Medieval Podillya, Ukraine" (2019).

His other works include "Istoriia, mova, heohrafiia: toponimy seredniovichnoho Podillia" (2021), "Nashi koroli – reges nostri. Volodari ta dynastii v istorii Ukrainy (1340–1795)" (2023), "Reges nostri Władcy i dynastie w historii Ukrainy (1340–1795)" (2024), and "Reges nostri. Our Kings. Monarchs and dynasties in the history of Ukraine (1340–1795)" (2024).
