= List of ambassadors of Belgium to South Korea =

Belgian Ambassador to the South Korea
- Arms of the Kingdom of Belgium
- Incumbent; Peter Lescouhier since 2018
- Website: https://republicofkorea.diplomatie.belgium.be/en

The list of ambassadors of Belgium to South Korea began after diplomatic relations were established in 1901. The official title of this diplomat is "Ambassador of the Kingdom of Belgium to the Republic of Korea".

Belgian-Korean diplomatic relations were initially established during the Joseon period of Korean history.

After the Denmark-Korea Treaty of 1902 was negotiated, ministers from Denmark could have been appointed in accordance with this treaty. However, diplomatic affairs were initially handled by the Belgian representative in Seoul.

== List of heads of mission ==
=== Consuls-General ===
- Leon Vincart, 1901

=== Ambassadors ===
- 1982-1985: Marcel Van Roey
- 1989–1990 Andre Mernier
- 1990 – 1991: Jean-Marie Noirfalisse
- 1998 – 2000: Renier Nijskens
- 2004: Koenraad Rouvroy
- 2007: Victor Wei
- 2008 – Pierre Clément Dubuisson
- 2016-2018 : Adrien Théatre
- 2018-2021: Peter Lescouhier
- 2021–present: Francois Bontemps

== See also ==
- Belgium-Korea Treaty of 1901
- List of diplomatic missions in South Korea
