= God Will Forgive =

Ukrainian short drama film

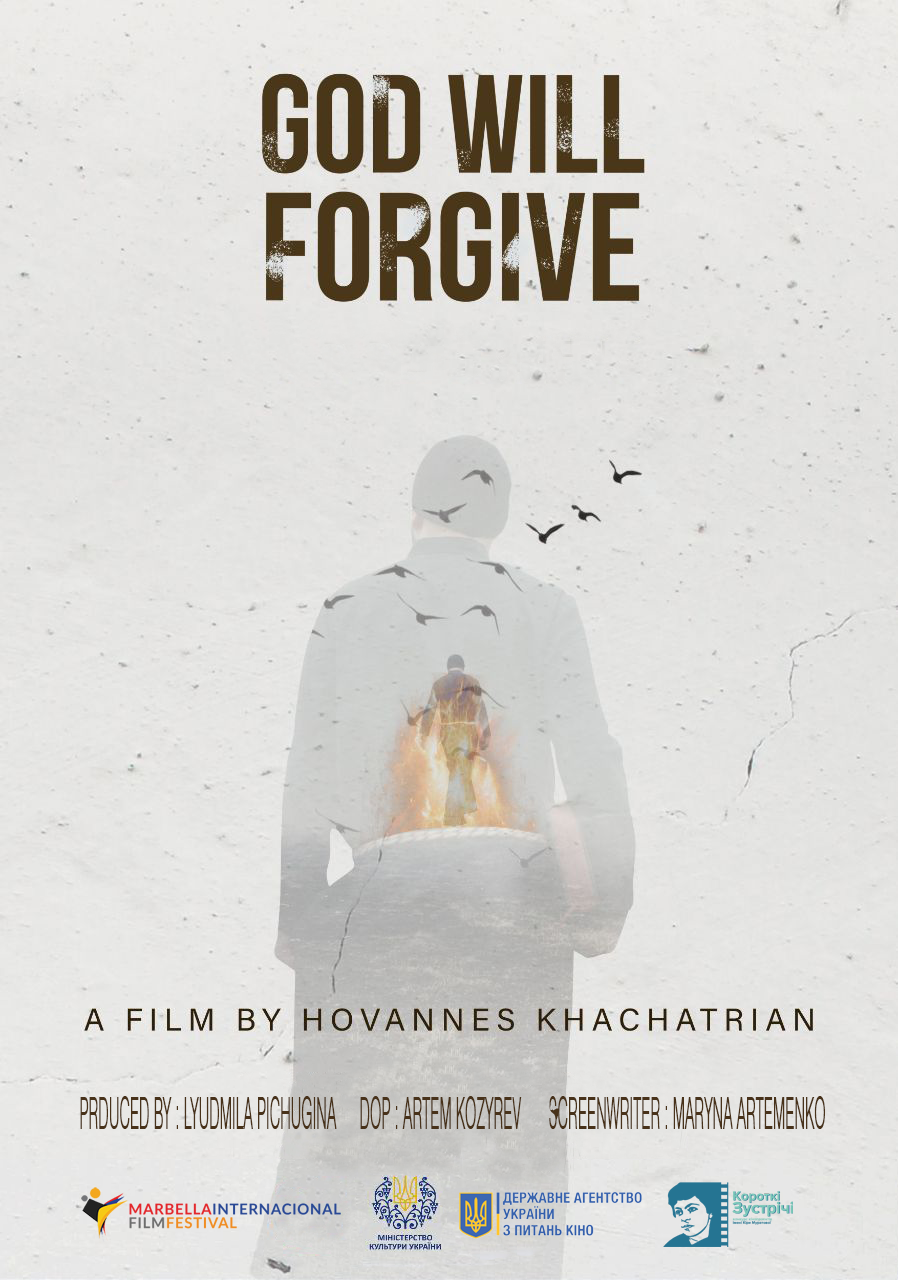
- Film poster
- Ukrainian: Бог простить
- Directed by: Hovhannes Khachatryan
- Written by: Maryna Artemenko
- Produced by: Mila Andriiash; Anton Sova; Olha Klymenko
- Starring: Viktor Zhdanov; Sergey Shadrin; Tamara Morozova; Danylo Braha
- Cinematography: Artem Kozyrev
- Edited by: Manvel Aramyan; Hovhannes Khachatryan
- Production company: Mila Andriiash
- Distributed by: TUARON (Worldwide)
- Release date: October 9, 2021 (KIFF)
- Running time: 17 minutes
- Country: Ukraine
- Languages: Ukrainian; Russian; English intertitles

God Will Forgive (Ukrainian: «Бог простить») is a Ukrainian short drama film directed by Hovhannes Khachatryan.

== Plot ==
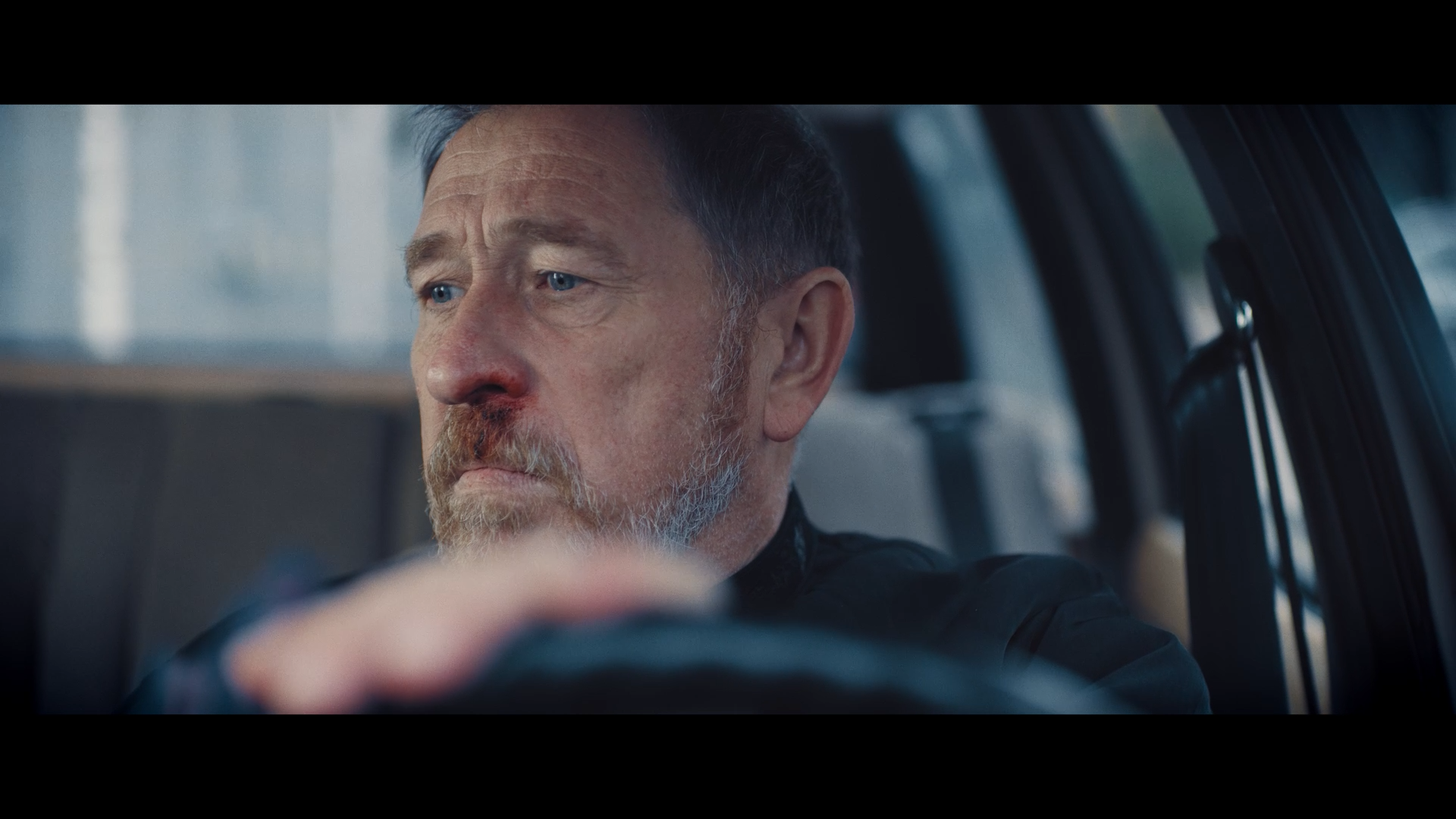
Viktor Zhdanov – Chaplain A still from the film.

The Ukrainian State Film Agency gives the following description of the film: "A Ukrainian priest, a chaplain, trying to get out of the grey zone, comes across a separatist convoy that has been shelled, where he meets a mortally wounded mercenary and is faced with a choice – to help or to keep running, but suddenly he accidentally steps on an anti-personnel mine."

On 9 July 2020, the short film God Will Forgive was one of the winners of the 13th Ukrainian State Film Council pitch and received funding after a vote by the State Council for the Support of Cinematography, and was also included in the selection of the 6 most interesting debut short film projects in the 13th Ukrainian State Film Council pitch.

On 8 November 2020, the Art Centre of Odesa Film Studio organised an award ceremony for the participants of the short film project Kira Muratova Short Encounters, where the script for God Will Forgive came second and received funding for the film project.

The film stars Viktor Zhdanov, who has also appeared in the films Cyborgs, Ex, Volcano, Zachar Berkut and other Ukrainian films and TV series.

The film was shot by Mila Andriiash with the help of the Ukrainian National Guard, which provided equipment and personnel. The film was produced by Mila Andriiash, Olga Klymenko and Swedish film producer Anton Sova.

The film reveals the acute problem of mined areas and was screened at international film festivals in Spain, Ukraine, Germany, US and Sweden.

== Cast ==
- Viktor Zhdanov — Chaplain
- Sergei Shadrin (1980–2021) — Separ
- Tamara Morozova — Mother
- Daniel Braga – Son

== Production ==
- How long did it take to find funding – 1 year
- How long did preparations take – 1.5 months
- How many days did it take to shoot the film – 4 days
- How long did the editing take – 1 month

External videos
- Official teaser of the film on YouTube

== Awards ==
- 2021 – 18th Kyiv International Film Festival "Kinolitopys" — Best Photography in a short film. Photographic Director: Artem Kozyrev.
- 2023 – 26th Golden Chicken International Film, Television and Radio Festival for Children and Youth — Best Feature Short Film.
- 2023 – Ukrainian Dream Film Festival — Best short film.
- 2023 – Direct Monthly Online Film Festival (DMOFF) — Best Ukrainian Director. Director: Hovhannes Khachatryan.
- 2023 – Dresden Cinema Awards — Best Producer: Mila Andriiash, Olga Klymenko, Anton Sova.
- 2023 – Navy International Film Festival — Best International Short Film and Best Producer: Mila Andriiash, Olga Klymenko, Anton Sova.
