= Alex Luna (Ukrainian singer) =

Ukrainian singer, male soprano, actor, film producer

- Олександр Тищенко
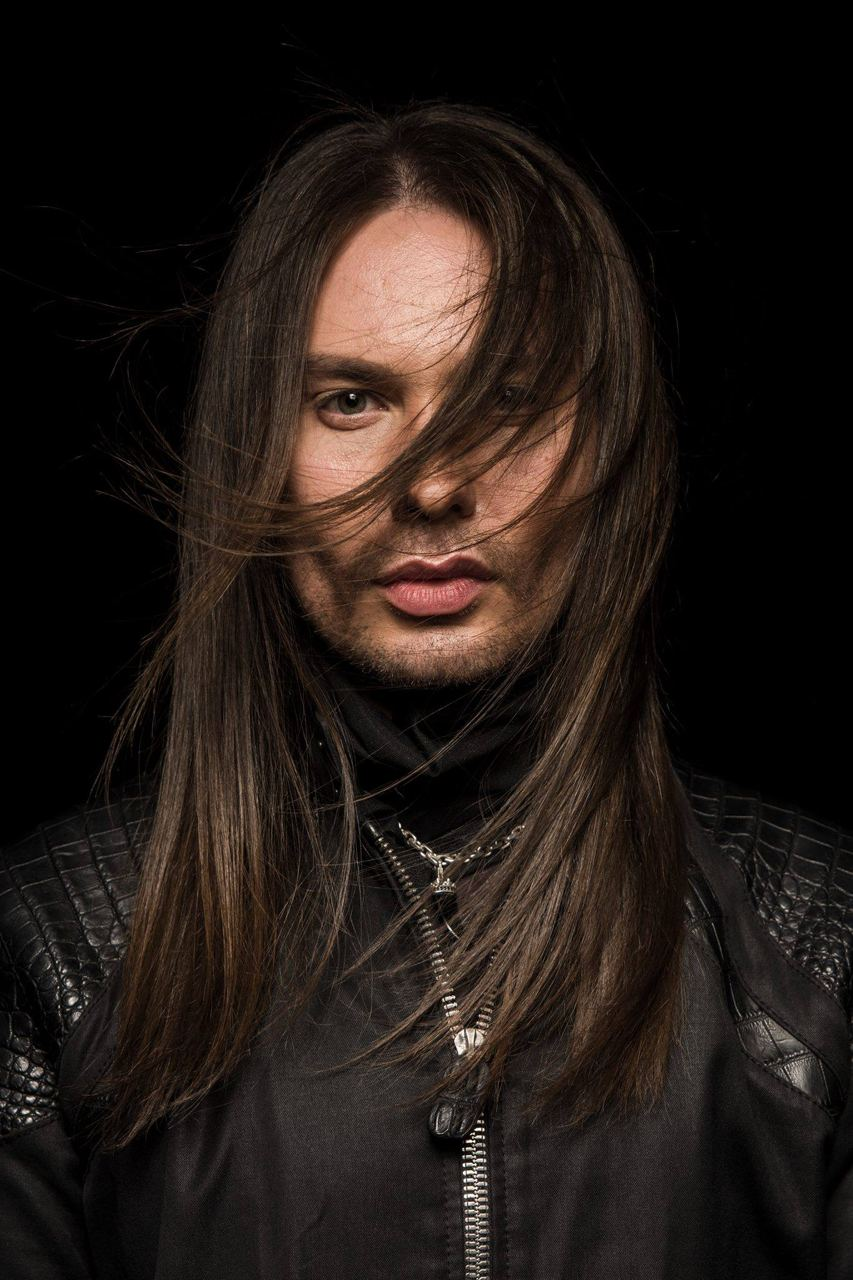
- Alex Luna in 2019
- Born: Oleksandr Tyshchenko; 2 March 1986 (age 40); Okhotsk, Khabarovsk Krai, USSR
- Other name: Alex Luna
- Citizenship: Ukraine
- Education: R. Glier Kyiv Institute of Music
- Occupations: Singer; film producer; actor
- Musical career
- Genres: Pop
- Instrument: Vocals
- Years active: 2003–present
- Labels: Catapult Music (2003–2008); TUARON (2009–present)
- Website: www.alexluna.eu

Oleksandr Tyshchenko (born 2 March 1986), known as Alex Luna, is a Ukrainian singer, who has been described as a male soprano, actor, film producer and public figure.

== Biography ==
Tyshchenko was born on 2 March 1986 in the city of Okhotsk, Khabarovsk Krai, USSR. In 1995 he moved with his family to the city of Bakhmach in Ukraine and in 1999 to the city of Kyiv.

In 2001, he entered the Kyiv Glier Institute of Music, graduating in 2005 with a degree in academic vocal performance.

In 2003, Oleksandr Zlotnyk invited Alex Luna to play one of the main roles (Voice of the South Sea) in the first Ukrainian musical Equator. Svitlana Loboda, Tina Karol, Vasyl Bondarchuk and Vasyl Lazarovych sang in the main cast with Alex Luna.

In 2007, Alex Luna signed his first professional contract with the music label Catapult Music. The result of the collaboration in 2008 was the debut album Svet luny (Moon Light). The presentation of the album took place in the Colonnade Hall of Kyiv City Hall. The first music video for the song "Light of the Moon" was created by American director Angel Gracia, who had previously worked with world stars Madonna and Enigma. During this time, legendary Italian composer Claudio Simonetti took an interest in the performer's voice to create an original musical style.

From 2007 to 2010, Alex Luna took part in numerous concepts dedicated to the end of the Second World War.

In 2008, he performed at the Ovation award ceremony.

Alex Luna has been working with the Swedish A&R and talent manager Anton Sova since 2009. The result of this collaboration was the release of the single "Hands to the Heavens" on the music label TUARON and further collaboration with the artist. The piano part of the single was played by the Ukrainian pianist Ignatijew Pawlo.

In 2009, Alex Luna received the "Man of the Year in the Dnieper Region" award. and Gallery magazine.

In 2010, the prima ballerina of the Bolshoi Theatre Anastasia Volochkova formed a tandem with Alex Luna and organized a joint tour "Nine Love Stories" and on 26 April Anastasia Volochkova and singer Alex Luna gave their first concert in Chernivtsi.

In August 2011, he performed the song "My Heart Will Go On" from the 1997 film Titanic at the 10th anniversary AIDs Gala in Berlin.

Since September 2011, Alex Luna has been the first official Goodwill Ambassador of the national information campaign for HIV/AIDS prevention "Don't give AIDS a chance!", organized by the Ukrainian Ministry of Healthcare and supported by GIZ (Deutsche Gesellschaft für Internationale Zusammenarbeit).

In October 2011, he performed at the 17th Opera Ball in Leipzig.

In 2011, he also took part in the opening of Ukraine's main Christmas tree with a children's ensemble and performed at the 3rd Presidential Charity Ball in Almaty, Kazakhstan.

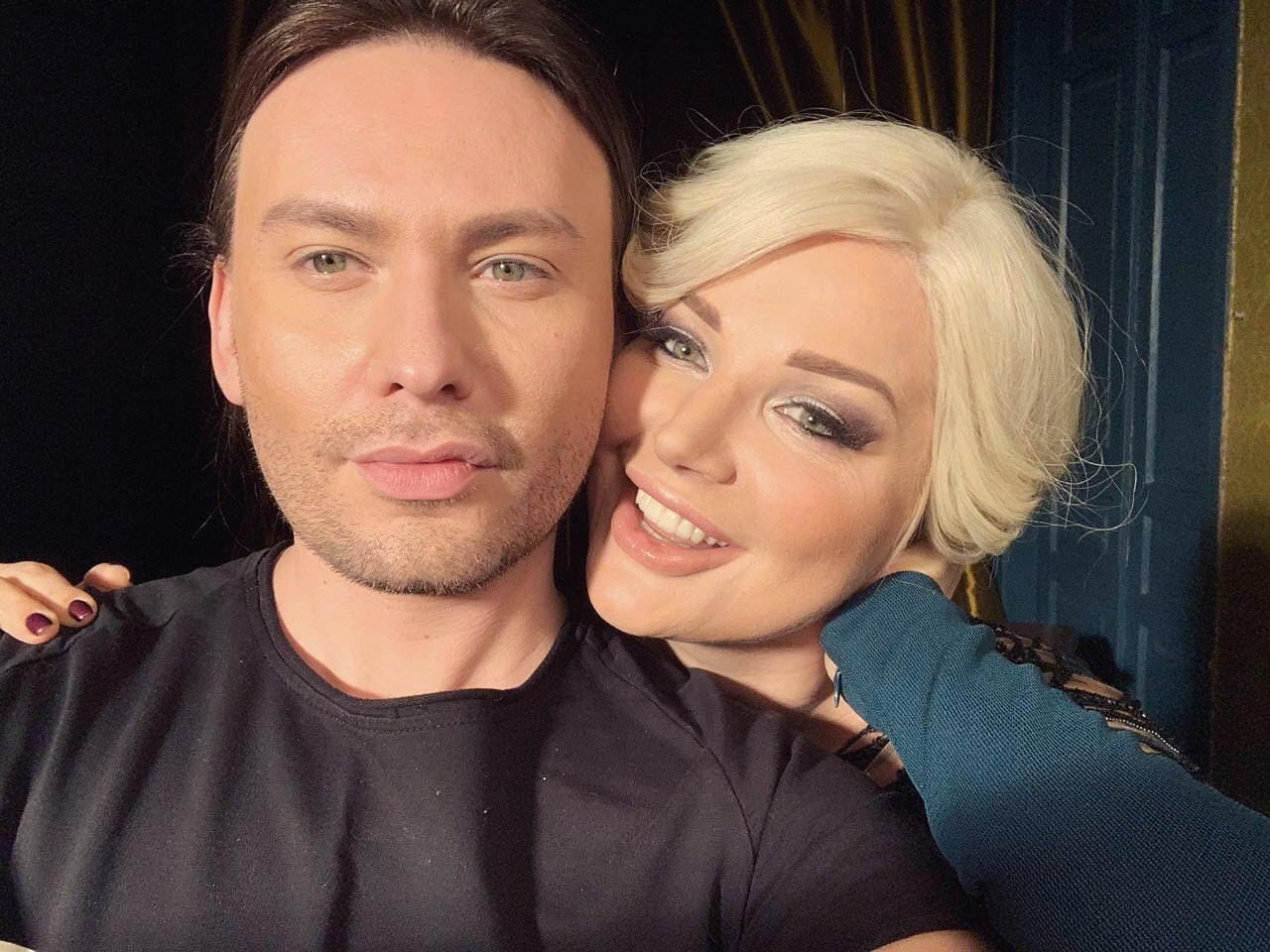
Alex Luna and Maria Maksakova

Alex Luna has been working with opera singer Maria Maksakova since 2017. For the first time, the artists performed their duet in Kyiv at the Vienna Ball. In 2018, the artists presented the concert program Queen of Spades on the stage of the Odessa Philharmonic and in the Kharkiv State Academic Opera and Ballet Theatre named after Mykola Lysenko.

In 2020, he co-produced the horror film In a Black-Black Room.

In 2021, Alex Luna created the art project Somnia Disaster, dedicated to the 35th anniversary of the Chornobyl tragedy. Ukrainian model Snijana Onopko took part in the art project. The presentation of the project took place on the anniversary of the tragedy on 26 April at the Civil Defense Museum "Wormwood Star" in the city of Chornobyl. On 28 April, at the National Conservation Area Saint Sophia Cathedral in Kyiv. On 14–21 August 2021, the project was presented at the 12th Odesa International Film Festival in Odesa.

Since 2022, Alex Luna has been a co-organizer of the Fundamentals of the Country charity foundation.

== Discography ==
=== Music videos ===
- 2007 – "Moonlight" (director: Angel Gracia)
- 2008 – "Night" (director: Yevgeniy Timokhin)
- 2009 – "Ruki k nebesam" [Hands to the heavens] (director: Alexey Fedosov)
- 2010 – "Nebesa" (Heavens)

=== Studio albums ===
- 2008 – Svet Luny [Moon Light]

=== Singles ===
- 2007 – "Moon light"
- 2008 – "Night"
- 2008 – "Ruki k nebesam" [Hands to the heavens]
- 2009 – "Mystery night"
- 2010 – "Nebesa" [Heavens]

== Filmography ==
=== Producer ===
- 2020 – "Black-Black Room"
