= International Visegrad Fund =

Central European donor organization

The International Visegrad Fund is an international donor organization promoting development and closer cooperation among the Visegrad Group (V4) countries—the Czech Republic, Hungary, Poland and Slovakia. The main aim of the fund is to strengthen the ties among peoples and institutions in Central and Eastern Europe through giving support to regional non-governmental initiatives. The fund is the only institutionalized form of regional cooperation among the Visegrad Group countries.

== Background ==
On 14 May 1999, at the Visegrad summit in Bratislava, the Prime Ministers of the V4 countries agreed that no institutional structures should be set up for the Visegrad Group, with the sole exception of the secretariat of the International Visegrad Fund in Bratislava. An agreement on the establishment of the fund was signed at the summit of the V4 Prime Ministers in Stiřín near Prague on 9 June 2000. Based on the agreement, the purpose of the fund is to promote and develop cultural cooperation in the fields of science, research, education and youth exchanges within the V4 region, and regional cooperation between the V4 region and other countries, especially in the Western Balkans and the EU's Eastern Partnership region.

=== Funding ===
The financial support distributed by the fund amounts to EUR 10 million a year and is provided by equal contributions of the V4 governments. In addition, since 2012 another EUR 6,4 million was provided by external donor countries (Canada, Germany, the Netherlands, South Korea, Sweden, Switzerland, the United States). The funding is channeled through grants for multilateral projects selected following calls for proposals and in the form of scholarships/fellowships for international mobility of individual scholars and artists.

== How it works ==
The fund's operations are run by an international staff of thirteen, consisting mostly of nationals of V4 countries and is managed by the executive director, who serves a rotating three-year diplomatic mission (order of rotation CZ, SK, PL, HU), as well as by the Deputy Executive Director (order of rotation PL, HU, CZ, SK). The V4 government are responsible for the supervision of the fund's activities and hold rotating, one-year presidencies. Czechia holds the IVF presidency from 1 January to 31 December 2022. The IVF Conference of Ministers and the Council of Ambassadors (composed of the ambassadors of the Visegrad countries accredited to the state which currently holds the IVF presidency) are the principal statutory bodies of the fund.

=== Executive directors ===
- 2000–2003 Urban Rusnák (Slovakia)
- 2003–2006 Andrzej Jagodziński (Poland)
- 2006–2009 Kristóf Forrai (Hungary)
- 2009–2012 Petr Vágner (Czech Republic)
- 2012–2015 Karla Wursterová (Slovakia)
- 2015–2018 Beata Jaczewska (Poland)
- 2018 – 2020 Andor F. Dávid (Hungary)
- 2020 – 2021 Edit Szilágyiné Bátorfi (Hungary)
- 2021 – 2024 Petr Mareš (Czech Republic)
- 2024 – now Linda Kapustová Helbichová (Slovakia)

=== Grant and mobility programs ===
- Visegrad Grants
- Visegrad Grants (focus on EaP and WB regions)
- Visegrad Strategic Grants
- Visegrad Scholarship Program
- Fellowships at Blinken Open Society Archives
- Visegrad Art Residencies—Visual & Sound Arts
- Visegrad Art Residencies—Performing Arts
- Visegrad Art Literary Residencies
- Visegrad Art Residencies in New York

== Eligibility ==
The fund provides funding to a diverse range of activities in all areas of life. Non-governmental organizations (NGOs), civil society organizations (CSOs), municipalities and local or regional governments, schools and universities, but also private companies are eligible for grant support, provided that their projects have a distinct focus on Visegrad region and further develop cooperation among project partners based in the Visegrad region.

Other beneficiaries, predominantly NGOs from non-EU countries neighbouring with the Visegrad region – from countries of the Eastern Partnership, such as Armenia, Azerbaijan, Belarus, Georgia, Moldova, Ukraine, and the Western Balkans – Albania, Bosnia and Herzegovina, Kosovo, North Macedonia, Montenegro and Serbia are eligible to receive support for projects focusing on the transfer of the unique experience and know-how of the Visegrad Group countries with the processes of democratic transformation and regional integration. An important element of this wider regional cooperation facilitated by the fund is to support activities contributing to political and socio-economic reforms in the partner countries with the aim to support political association and further economic integration between the European Union, the Eastern Partnership, and the aforementioned western Balkans countries.

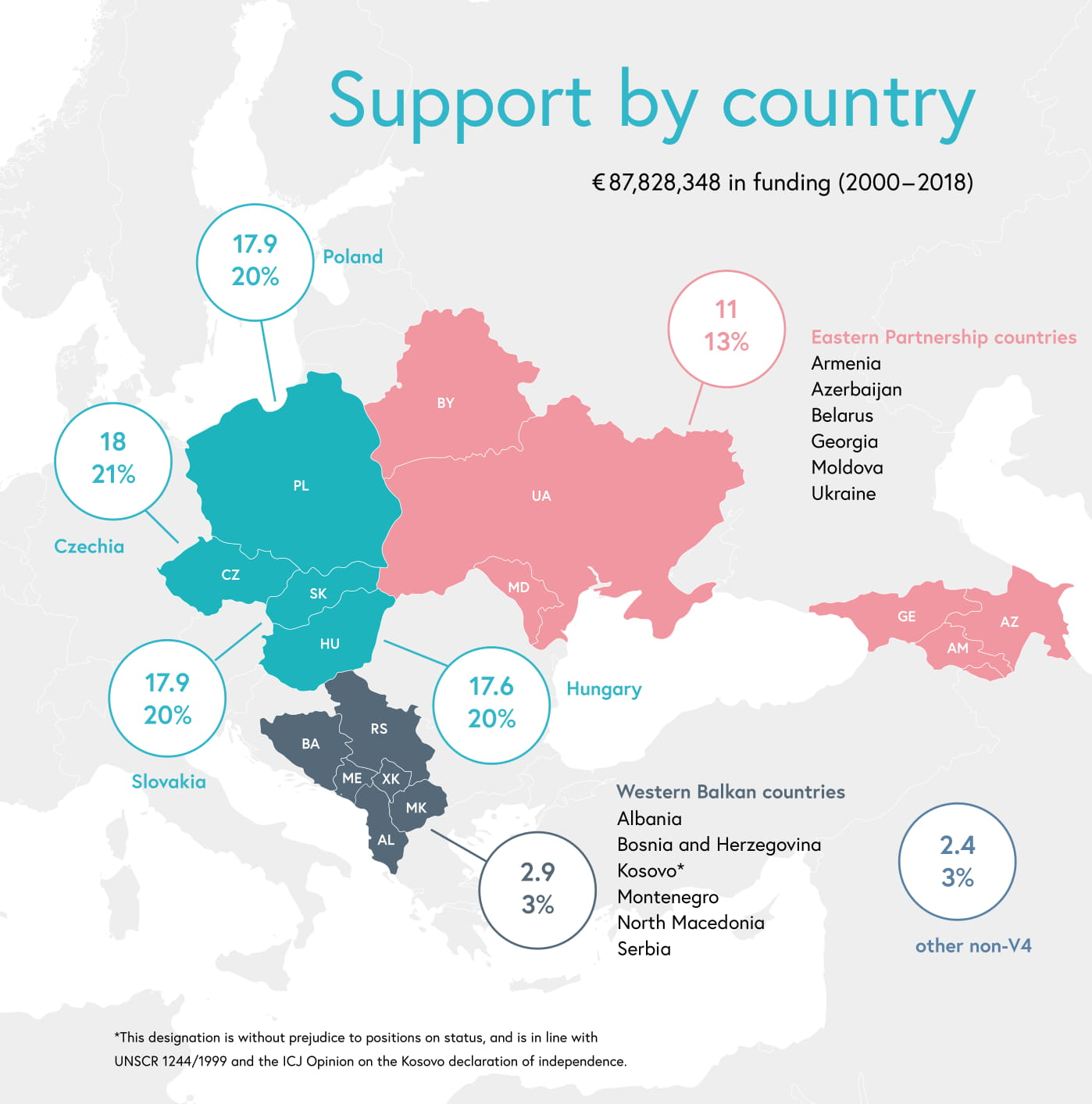
Regional cooperation support distributed by Visegrad Fund between 2000-2018

=== Areas of support ===
- Culture & Common Identity
- Education & Capacity Building^{[ibid]}
- Innovation, R&D, Entrepreneurship
- Democratic Values & Media
- Public Policy & Institutional Partnership
- Regional Development, Environment, Tourism
- Social Development
