= Belgium–Korea Treaty of 1901 =

1901 treaty between Belgium and Korea

The Belgium–Korea Treaty of 1901 was negotiated between representatives of the Kingdom of Belgium and the Korean Empire.

== Background ==
In 1876, Korea established a trade treaty with Japan after Japanese ships approached Ganghwado and threatened to fire on the Korean capital city. Treaty negotiations with several Western countries were made possible by the completion of this initial Japanese overture.

In 1882, the Americans concluded a treaty and established diplomatic relations, which served as a template for subsequent negotiations with other Western powers.

== Treaty provisions ==
The Belgians and Koreans negotiated and approved a multi-article treaty with provisions similar to other Western nations.

Ministers from Belgium to Korea were appointed in accordance with this treaty; and they were Leon Vincart, consul general, October 17, 1901, with Maurice Cuvelier as vice consul.

The treaty remained in effect even after the Japanese protectorate was established in 1905.

== See also ==
- Unequal treaties
- List of Ambassadors from Belgium to South Korea
