= Anders Johansson (artist manager) =

Swedish music manager (born 1973)

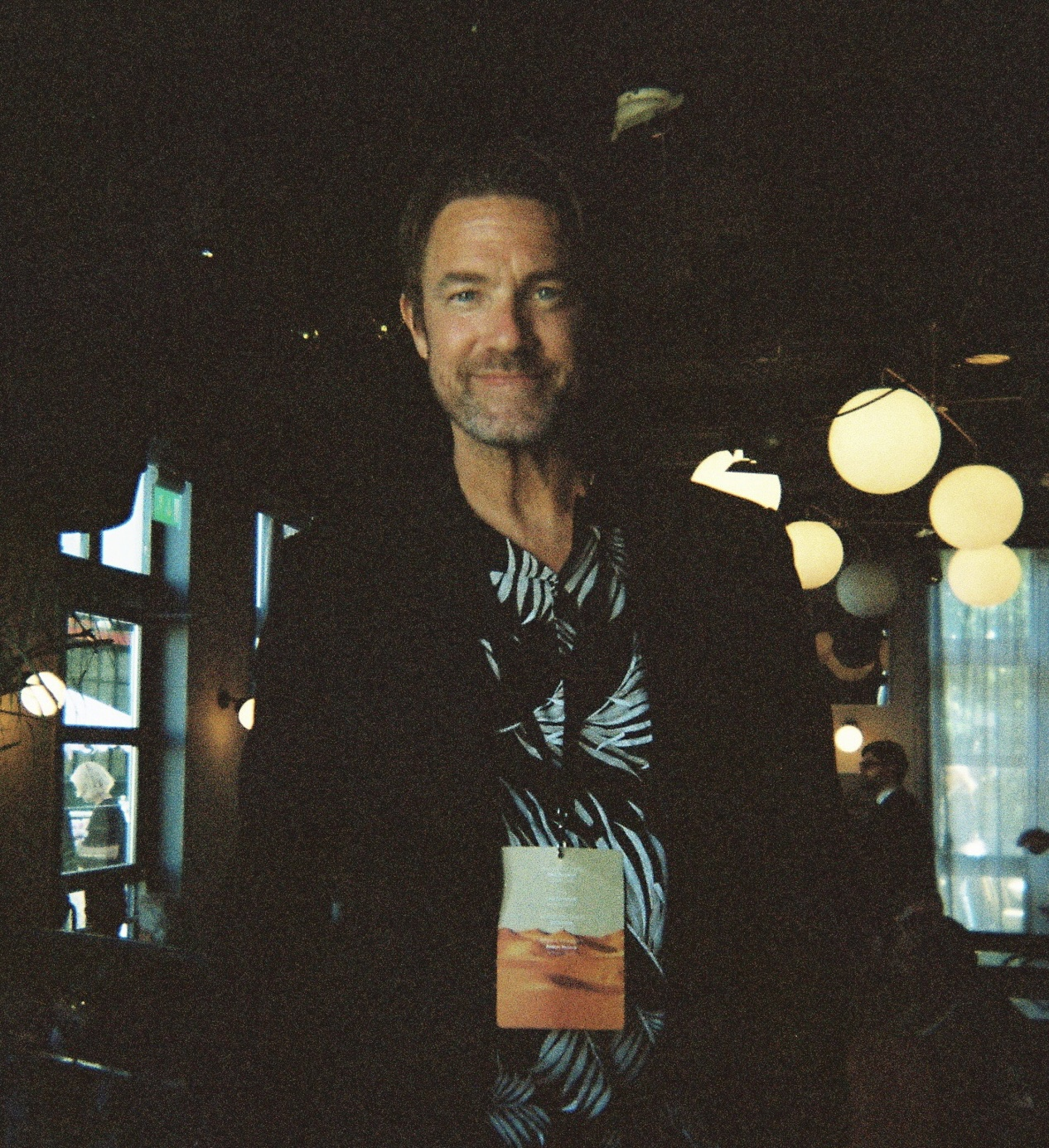
- Born: 4 July 1973 (age 53)
- Occupations: music manager, A&R
- Employer: Buddys

Lars Anders Johansson (born July 4, 1973) is a Swedish artist manager, A&R representative known as manager for A-Teens, Carola, Sahara Hotnights, Smith & Thell, Veronica Maggio and others.

== Biography ==
Anders Johansson grew up initially in Alnö, Sundsvall, but moved early to Stockholm. Following studies in England and United States, he joined Stockholm Records as an intern and later A&R manager, with Ola Håkansson as one of his mentors. Here, he signed LOK in 1997 and recruited the members of A-Teens, founded in 1998. In 2001, he became A&R manager at Universal following their acquisition of Stockholm Records.

Thereafter, Johansson founded his own artist management company, Albot & Albot in 2008, and became a manager for Veronica Maggio, Sahara Hotnights and Carola. In parallel, he was engaged by Melodifestivalen to manage A&R from 2012.

In 2016, he partnered with NYC-based Jon Allen under the Buddys name. Their clients have included Veronica Maggio, Smith & Thell, Sandro Cavazza, NOTD, Estraden, and others.

Since 2018, Johansson has been appointed board member of Music Managers Forum Sweden (MMF).

Johansson was awarded MVP at the Denniz Pop Awards 2022.
