= Anastasia Volochkova =

Russian prima ballerina

- Анастасия Волочкова
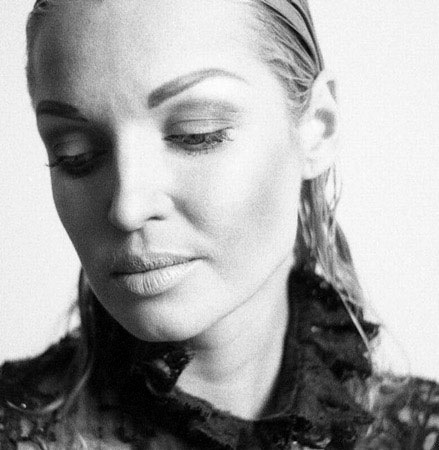
- Volochkova in 2008
- Born: Anastasia Yuryevna Volochkova; 20 January 1976 (age 50); Leningrad, Russian SFSR, Soviet Union (now Saint Petersburg, Russia)
- Occupation: Ballerina
- Years active: 1993–present
- Children: 1
- Anastasia Volochkova's voice Volochkova on the Echo of Moscow program, 21 April 2014
- Website: volochkova.ru

Anastasia Yuryevna Volochkova (Russian: Анастасия Юрьевна Волочкова; born 20 January 1976) is a former Russian ballet dancer.

== Early life ==
Volochkova was born into a middle-class family in Leningrad, Russian SFSR (now Saint Petersburg, Russia). Her father was a table tennis champion and coach, and her mother was a tour guide.

Volochkova was five years old, when her mother took her to see The Nutcracker at the Mariinsky Theatre. "When I left the hall, I told my mother I wanted to be a famous ballerina," Volochkova has said, "On the face of it, I didn't have the right build - I didn't have long legs, and I wasn't flexible, quick or springy - nothing. All I maybe had was a beautiful body and a big wish. I didn't just take classes - I also had private lessons at home with a teacher. I worked very hard."

Volochkova was trained at the prestigious Vaganova Ballet Academy by Natalia Dudinskaya. Still a student, Volochkova became the youngest soloist of the Mariinsky Ballet, making her debut as Odette-Odile in Swan Lake at the Mariinsky Theatre in 1993. She was a prima ballerina and student at the same time, the first in the history of the Mariinsky. The following year, she received her diploma with honours, and became a soloist of the Mariinsky Ballet. In 1996, Volochkova won the first prize and gold medal at the 2nd Lifar International Ballet Competition in Kyiv.

== Career ==
=== Mariinsky Ballet: 1994–1998 ===
Between 1994 and 1998, Volochkova danced as a soloist with the Mariinsky Ballet at the Mariinsky Theatre in Saint Petersburg, performing in productions of Don Quixote, Giselle, La Bayadère, Le Corsaire, Raymonda, Scheherazade, The Firebird, The Fountain of Bakhchisarai, The Nutcracker and The Sleeping Beauty. Together with the Mariinsky Ballet, she also got to tour all around the world, including Great Britain, Belgium, France, Spain, Italy, Greece, Austria, Germany, Denmark, Norway, Bahrain, South Korea, Japan, Canada and the United States, making her US debut at the Metropolitan Opera House in 1995.

=== Bolshoi Ballet: 1998–2000 ===
From 1998 to 2000, Volochkova danced as leading soloist with the Bolshoi Ballet at the Bolshoi Theatre in Moscow, guided by Ekaterina Maximova. Volochkova performed in productions of Giselle, La Bayadère, Raymonda, Russian Hamlet, Swan Lake and The Sleeping Beauty, touring throughout Europe as well. Additionally, she also headlined a performance at the Kennedy Center in Washington, D.C., the USA. In 2001, Yury Grigorovich personally invited her to return to the Bolshoi Ballet to dance the double-role of Odette-Odile in Swan Lake at the Bolshoi Theatre, for which Volochkova was awarded the prestigious Prix Benois de la Danse in 2002. In the same year, she was also awarded with the title of Honoured Artist of Russia.

After various disagreements with the Bolshoi Ballet over the years, Volochkova's contract was terminated in 2003. It became a major news story worldwide as it was reported that the Bolshoi Ballet had dismissed her for being too tall and heavy. A Moscow court ruled that the Bolshoi Ballet had to reinstate Volochkova immediately and awarded her thousands of US dollars in back pay and damages. Although the Bolshoi Ballet is officially Volochkova's employer, she has not been offered a single role by the company since 2004.

On being fired by the Bolshoi Ballet, Volochkova has said: "At that time, I was not dancing either at the Mariinsky or the Bolshoi, and I knew that I had two options - the first was to be afraid of the world of ballet, and the second was to create something new and unusual that would let me stand in front of an audience of my own, independently. I wanted to be a ballerina by my own right and to create in my own name."

=== Solo career: 1998–present ===
Once described as one of the biggest names in Russian ballet, Volochkova started her solo career in the late 1990s. She has since danced with the New National Theatre Ballet Tokyo, the Bordeaux Ballet and the English National Ballet. In Russia, Volochkova has danced as prima ballerina with the Hermitage Ballet and the Grigorovich Ballet, performing in Giselle, La Bayadère, Le Corsaire, Spartacus and Swan Lake. With the Grigorovich Ballet, she has mainly performed at the Krasnodar Theater, but also among others at the Mariinsky Theatre.

During the years, Volochkova has also given numerous gala performances and recitals in Moscow, Paris, London, Athens, Lausanne, Tel Aviv, Abu Dhabi, New York and many others. Solely in London, she has headlined performances at the Royal Albert Hall, Royal Opera House, Coliseum, Palladium and Sadler's Wells Theatre, where she made her debut in Rodion Shchedrin's Carmen Suite, based on the opera Carmen by Georges Bizet. The ballet was originally staged for Maya Plisetskaya at the Bolshoi Theatre by choreographer Alberto Alonso, and Plisetskaya personally directed the role for Volochkova. In New York, Volochkova has performed at the Alice Tully Hall of Lincoln Center for the Performing Arts.

In 2010, Anastasia Volochkova formed a tandem with Ukrainian countertenor Alex Luna and organise a joint tour "Nine Stories of Love".

As of 2010, Volochkova starred in her first tour of Chile, performing in Santiago, Antofagasta, La Serena, Viña del Mar, Talca, Temuco, Puerto Montt and Concepción. The Tales of Destiny show included fragments and highlights of some of the most famous ballets, including Don Quixote, Giselle and Swan Lake, as well as contemporary choreographies set to music by Nino Rota, Charles Dumont, Ara Gevorgyan and Karl Jenkins. In the show, Volochkova was supported by principal dancers and soloists of both the Bolshoi and Mariinsky Ballets.

With her benefit performances, Volochkova has helped to contribute funds for various causes, especially for Russian children, including children with health problems, orphanages of Saint Petersburg and the Beslan victims. She has also supported a secondary school in Saint Petersburg, for example, with a benefit performance at Sadler's Wells Theatre in London.

=== Other work ===
In addition to her career as a dancer, Volochkova has also worked as an actress and a model, starring in films and TV series as well as modelling for Chopard jewellery.

She appeared in the first season of ice show contest Ice Age.

== Personal life ==
Volochkova has been married once, and she has a daughter, Ariadna, born in 2005. They live in Saint Petersburg and Moscow.

In 2010, Volochkova graduated with an MBA from the Higher School of Economics. "I plan to create a network of schools of creative education, which will teach the choreography, visual arts, music and ethics", she has said regarding her future plans.

== Media personality ==
Volochkova is a celebrity in Russia, and has featured in newspapers, magazines, and TV shows, such as Ice Age, on a regular basis.

In 2003, it was reported that the Bolshoi Ballet had dismissed her for being too heavy and tall. Russian Minister of Culture Mikhail Shvydkoy had suggested her to accept lesser roles, such as minor part in Swan Lake, to which Volochkova responded: "I have played the leading role in nearly every classical ballet. Legally I should be reinstated into the same position as I was in before". In 2004, Volochkova filed a million dollar lawsuit against her former manager Anatoly Iksanov, claiming harm to her personal and professional reputation. She stated that "Ballet is not an art of kilograms; it is an art of the soul". The court found for her and awarded $6,400.

In 2011, after being part of the United Russia party for eight years, she quit its membership. In an interview with Radio Liberty, she said that she decided to quit the party after United Russia had duped her into signing condemnation of the imprisoned oligarch Mikhail Khodorkovsky.

In 2013, Volochkova compared Bolshoi Ballet to a brothel, citing that ballerinas were forced to have sex with the oligarchs, or, upon refusal, they would be expelled from the school or be banned from international tours.

She has been outspoken against the annexation of Crimea to Russia in 2014, and stated that, for her, Crimea would always be a part of Ukraine.

== See also ==
- List of Russian ballet dancers
