= TUARON =

Global talent management company, record label, publisher

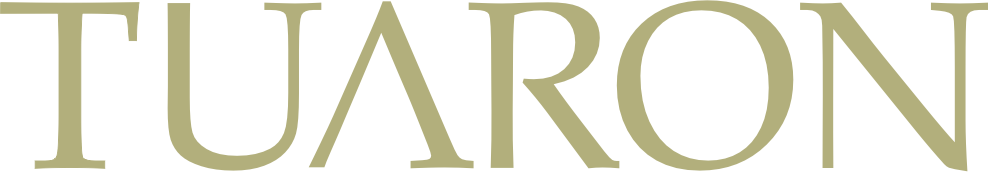
- Logo used since 2018

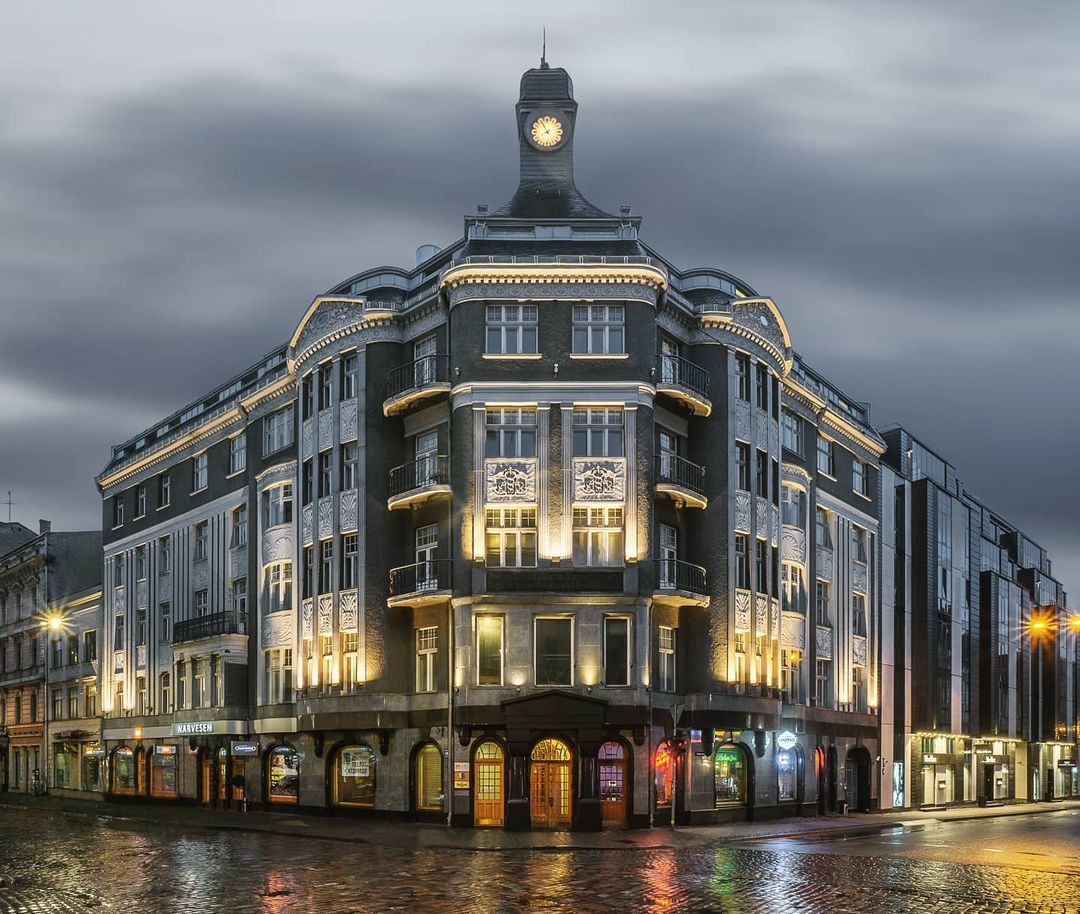
- Global headquarters in Riga, Latvia
- Company type: Private company
- Industry: Talent management; Talent and literary agencies; Music; Digital media; Entertainment; Publishing
- Founded: June 22, 2004; 21 years ago in Kyiv, Ukraine
- Founder: Anton Sova
- Headquarters: Riga, Latvia
- Number of locations: Berlin, Madrid, Stockholm, Paris, Vienna, Zürich, New York City, London
- Area served: Worldwide
- Key people: Anton Sova (CEO)
- Products: Music; Entertainment
- Services: Music rights management; Talent and artist management; A&R services; Digital marketing; Brand strategy; Film and audiovisual production
- Owner: Dizex, Inc.
- Number of employees: 213 (2023)
- Website: www.tuaron.com

TUARON is a global talent, model and sports scouting corporation, as well as a record label and publisher, headquartered in Latvia. Originally established in Ukraine in 2004, TUARON has grown into an influential player in the talent agency business, representing numerous clients. The company provides tailored solutions for artists, models, athletes, influencers, and various other talents seeking professional management to develop and enhance their careers.

== History ==
The TUARON music label was founded in June 2004 with the mission of supporting talented musicians. The company manages, publishes, and distributes albums by both Latvian and international artists spanning various music genres.

Over the years, the company has undergone multiple rebrandings, previously known as Tuaron Music and Tuaron Management. In 2018, TUARON unveiled a rebranded identity, introducing a new conceptual approach to artist collaboration and a registered trademark styled in all capital letters.

The company's distributor is the American firm Symphonic Distribution.

In its initial phase, the label's catalogue predominantly consisted of releases by artists Anton Sova collaborated with during TUARON's establishment. These included singers Artur Bosso, Andrew Boldar, Alex Luna, hip-hop artist Kal1br, and Latvian artists Giacomo and Andrey Klad.

The label's debut release occurred on February 12, 2012, with a single by Ukrainian singer Artur Bosso. The track was set to the music of Swedish band BWO (Bodies Without Organs), inspired by their song "Sunshine In The Rain", with original lyrics and a new title, "Amsterdam". Following contracts with Alex Luna and Andrew Boldar, the catalogue expanded to include their debut singles, "Hands to the heavens" and "Not together".

== Discography ==
- 2012 – Artur Bosso – Amsterdam
- 2012 – Giacomo – I am a slave of love
- 2012 – Giacomo – Memory. Memoirs
- 2012 – Giacomo & Chehonte – Day. Year. Infinity
- 2016 – Kal1br feat. Anubis – Up
- 2016 – Alex Luna – Hands to the heavens
- 2016 – Kal1br – Time
- 2016 – Andrew Boldar – So many falsehoods
- 2016 – Andrey Klad – To be one
- 2017 – Andrew Boldar – Not together

== Filmography ==
- 2021 – God Will Forgive

== Company Membership ==
As a music label, TUARON is a member of STIM (Svenska Tonsättares Internationella Musikbyrå), the Swedish collecting society for songwriters, composers and music publishers.

== See also ==
- List of record labels
- List of modeling agencies
- List of record labels starting with T
