= Kyiv University of Culture =

Private university in Kyiv, Ukraine

Coordinates: 50.4243°N 30.5345°E

- Київський університет культури
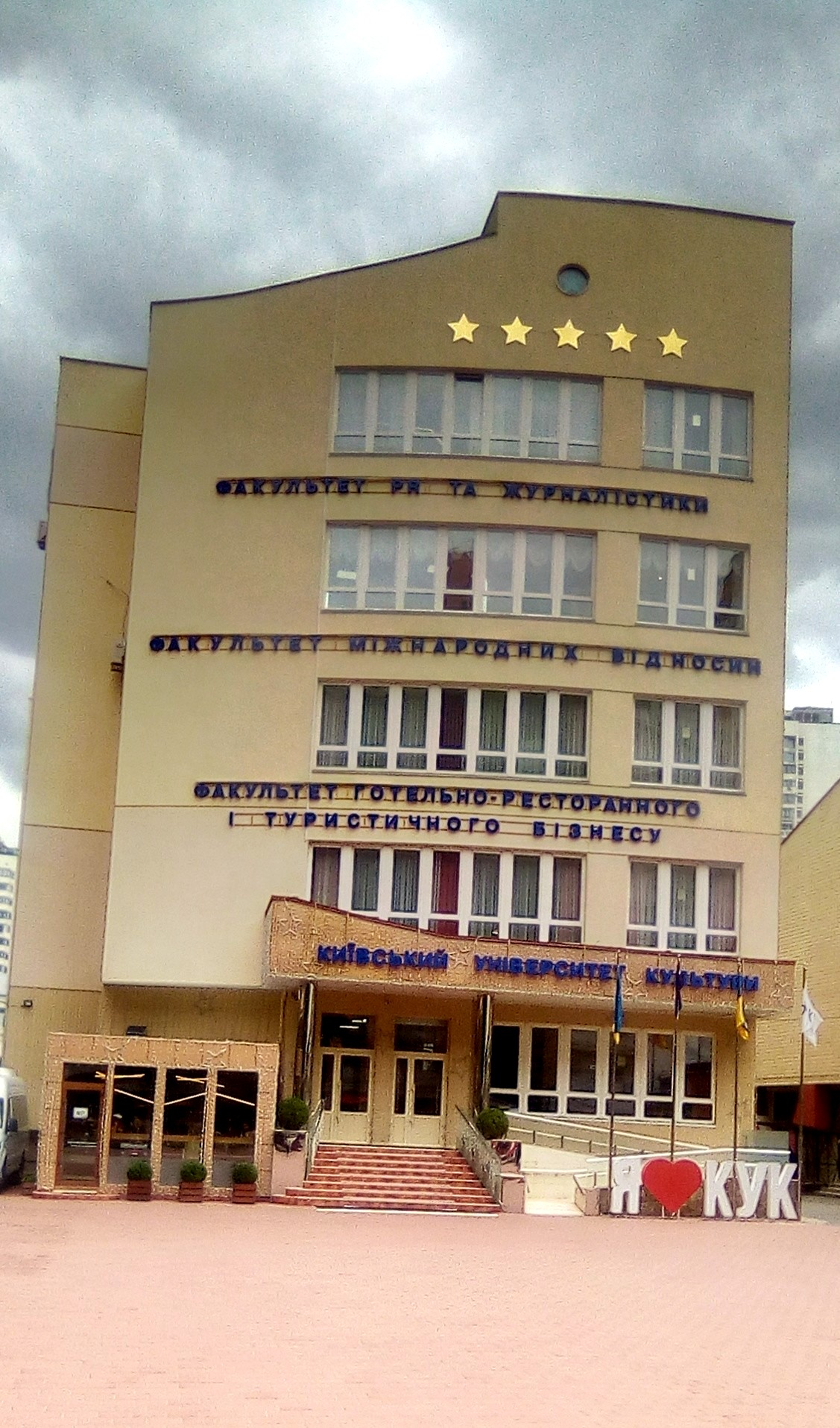
- Type: Private
- Established: 2000
- Accreditation: Ministry of Education and Science of Ukraine (2021)
- Rector: Volodymyr Pylypiv
- Location: Kyiv, Ukraine
- Language: Ukrainian
- Website: kuk.edu.ua

The Kyiv University of Culture (abbr. KUC, Ukrainian: Київський університет культури, romanized: Kyïvskyĭ universytet kultury) is a private higher education institution in Ukraine.

== History ==
Kyiv University of Culture carries out scientific and educational activities at the first (bachelor's), second (master's) and third (educational and scientific) levels of higher education. It was founded in 2000. KUC carries out its educational activities in accordance with the licence of the Ministry of Education and Science of Ukraine to provide educational services. KUC is accredited at the fourth, highest level of accreditation. It is located in Kyiv. The rector of the institution is Professor Volodymyr Pylypiv.

== KUC structure ==
As of 2023, KUC includes 2 institutes, 5 faculties, 1 college and a number of separate structural units in other cities of Ukraine and Poland.

Institutes

- Institute of Hotel, Restaurant and Tourism Business
- Institute of Public Administration and Law

Faculties

- Faculty of Arts
- Faculty of Choreographic Arts
- Faculty of Fashion Industry
- Faculty of Journalism and International Relations
- Faculty of Law

College

Professional College of Kyiv University of Culture
