= André Mernier =

Belgian diplomat (born 1943)

André Mernier (born 26 May 1943) is a former Belgian diplomat and Secretary General of the Energy Charter Secretariat. He held the post from 2006 to 2011, and has been retired since January 2012.

André Mernier is married and has two children.

== Early life ==
In 1963–1972 Mernier served as an officer in the Belgian Armed Forces, and, prior to that, attended a military academy in Brussels. In 1973 he received a law degree from the University of Louvain.

== Foreign service ==
In 1975, André Mernier joined the Ministry of Foreign Affairs of Belgium.

- 1976 - Vice-Consul at the Consulate in Amsterdam
- 1977–1978 - Chargé d'affaires at the Embassy in Cyprus
- 1978–1981 - Permanent Representation of Belgium to the NATO
- 1981–1985 - First Secretary at the Embassy in Washington, D.C.
- 1985–1988 - Consul at the Consulate in East Berlin
- 1988–1990 - Chief of the Belgian Military Mission in West Berlin and Consul General of Belgium
- 1990–1994 - Ambassador of Belgium to the Republic of Korea
- 1994–1996 - Director of the Disarmament Section, Ministry of Foreign Affairs
- 1996–1999 - Ambassador of Belgium in Geneva
- 2000–2004 - Ambassador of Belgium in Moscow, accredited also to Belarus, Moldova, Armenia, Georgia, Uzbekistan, Tajikistan, Kyrgyzstan and Kazakhstan
- 2005 - Director of Energy Services, Ministry of Foreign Affairs
