= Music Managers Forum Sweden =

Swedish music-industry organization

- Industry: Music
- Founded: 2008; 18 years ago
- Headquarters: Stockholm, Sweden
- Website: mmfsweden.com

Music Managers Forum Sweden (MMF) is a Swedish non-profit association, founded in 2008 with the name Music Managers Forum Sweden (MMF). It is a lobby and interest organisation for Swedish music managers, A&R and talent scouts, and music publishers. Since 2012, the MMF has been based at Johannesgränd in Stockholm.

== History ==
The MMF was founded in 2008 but the organisation was put on hold a few years later to be restarted in 2017 in its current form.

The organisation is a non-profit membership organisation that represents Swedish music managers from all over the country, large and small, established and new. Music Managers Forum Sweden (MMF) promotes issues of importance to the music industry, both domestic and international. Offers support and networking opportunities to its members. Represents around 50 of Sweden's leading music managers, A&R and talent scouts.

MMF Sweden is part of the international network European Music Management Alliance (EMMA). Through EMMA, MMF Sweden drives common issues at an international level. In 2023, EMMA is launching the EMMpower project, which aims to strengthen European music management.

The MMF's purpose is to represent its members and drive issues that are important to the music industry. The organisation works on issues such as copyright, streaming, distribution and marketing.

Current board: Per Kviman (Versity Music), Dita Kleman (Rec Sthlm), Marie Dimberg (Dimberg Management), Anders Johansson (Buddys Management), Helene Hillerstrom Miksche (COM Advokatbyrå), Noomi Hedlund (On A Boat), Anders Larsson (United Stage), Johan Soderholm (Sqream Management), Par Stavborg (iFPS), Karl Hogmo (Buddys Management), Naomi Wood (Wood Music).

The MMF Awards Sweden was initiated in 2024 with the aim of putting a light on the music industry teams and individuals behind the artists and campaigns. The Awards is to be held annually in Stockholm during the month of May.

- 2024 - The MMF Awards Sweden - winners
- 2025 - The MMF Awards Sweden - winners
