= Kyiv Slavonic University =

- Київський славістичний університет
- Type: Private
- Established: 1993
- Rector: Prof. Vladimir Domnich
- Location: Kyiv, Ukraine

The Kyiv Slavic University (Ukrainian: Київський славістичний університет) is a private higher education institution in Ukraine at IV level of accreditation, founded in 1993 under the Academy of Sciences as the Kyiv Institute "Slavic University".

== History ==
On 9 November 1993, the constituent meeting of the founding members of the non-governmental organization Kyiv Slavic University was held in the premises of the Presidium of the National Academy of Sciences of Ukraine. The collective members of the organization were: the National Academy of Sciences of Ukraine, the Drahomanov State Pedagogical University of Ukraine, the Stock Exchange of Ukraine, the Youth Committee of the Kyiv State Administration, the Main Department of Geodesy, Cartography and Cadastre of the Cabinet of Ministers of Ukraine, the Trade Union Federation of Ukraine, the Moscow Branch of the Prominvestbank of Ukraine, the Topographic and Geological Survey Colleges of Kyiv, the research and production company "TEP" and many other public and commercial organizations.

On 25 November 1993, the Ministry of Justice issued a law on the state registration of the Kyiv Slavic University (the date of its official foundation).

The purpose of the university was to train highly qualified specialists in a wide range of fields and specialties and to conduct research on Slavic studies.

30 December 1993. The Kyiv Slavic University was inaugurated in Kyiv. The university was inaugurated by Archimandrite Seraphim. The first lecture for the students of preparatory university education and secondary school students of Kyiv schools was delivered by the Ambassador Extraordinary and Plenipotentiary of the Slovak Republic to Ukraine Robert Harenchar.

== Institutes ==
- Institute of Slavic Studies and International Relations
- Institute of Economics and Management
- Interregional Humanitarian Institute
- Institute of Social Economy and Local Government
- Transcarpathian Department
- Chernihiv Department
- NCC for Crimea
- South Slavic Institute in Mykolaiv
- Rivne Institute of Slavic Studies
