= List of Ukrainian writers =

This list includes authors who wrote in the Ukrainian language or its historical predecessors (such as Old East Slavic and Ruthenian language), as well as authors who wrote in other languages, but had Ukrainian ancestry and dedicated their works to Ukrainian topics. Names are represented in chronological order and separated according to historical period.

== Medieval era ==
- Jacob the Monk (11th century)
- Theodosius of Pechersk (1009–1074)
- Metropolitan Hilarion (fl. 1049–-1054)
- Volodimer Monomakh (1053–1125)
- Nestor the Chronicler (c. 1056–c. 1114)
- Daniel the Traveller (fl. 1104–1107)
- Kirill of Turov (1130–1182)
- Kliment Smoliatich (fl. 1147–1164)
- Serapion of Pechersk (fl. 1247–1275)
- Cyprian, Metropolitan of Kiev (c. 1336–1406)
- Gregory Tsamblak (c. 1365–c. 1420)

== Early Modern period ==
- Pavlo Rusyn (c. 1470–1517)
- Stanislav Orikhovskyi (1513–1566)
- Ipatii Potii (1541–1613)
- Ivan Vyshenskyi (c. 1550–after 1621)
- Zacharias Kpystenskyi (fl. 1616-1627)
- Job of Pochayiv (c. 1551–1651)
- Pamvo Berynda (c. 1560–1632)
- Lavrentii Zyzanii (1560s–c. 1634)
- Meletius Smotrytskyi (1577–1633)
- Kyrylo Stavrovetskyi (1581–1646)
- Athanasius of Brest (c. 1595–1648)
- Petro Mohyla (1596–1647)
- Sylvester Kosiv (c. 1600–1657)
- Innocent Gizel (c. 1600–1683)
- Joannicius Galiatovskyi (c. 1620–1688)
- Lazar Baranovych (1620–1693)
- Marusia Churai (1625–1653, legendary)
- Danylo Tuptalo (1651–1709)
- Stefan Yavorskyi (1658–1722)
- Samiilo Velychko (1670–after 1728)
- Theophan Prokopovych (1681–1736)
- Emanuel Kozachynskyi (1699–1755)
- Vasyl Hryhorovych-Barskyi (1701–1747)
- Semen Klymovskyi (c. 1705–c. 1785)
- George Konyskyi (1717–1795)
- Hryhorii Skovoroda (1722–1794)
- Andriy Bachynskyi (1732–1809)
- Ipolyt Bohdanovych (1744–1803)
- Vasyl Kapnist (1758–1823)

== 19th century ==
- Ivan Kotliarevskyi (1769–1838)
- Vasyl Hohol (1777–1825)
- Hryhorii Kvitka-Osnovianenko (1778–1843)
- Vasyl Narizhnyi (1780–1825)
- Vasyl Dovhovych (1783–1849)
- Mykola Hnidych (1784–1833)
- Petro Hulak-Artemovskyi (1790–1865)
- Tymko Padura (1801–1871)
- Alexander Dukhnovych (1803–1865)
- Mykhailo Maksymovych (1804–1873)
- Oleksa Storozhenko (1806–1874)
- Pylyp Morachevskyi (1806–1879)
- Osyp Bodianskyi (1808–1877)
- Mykola Hohol (1809–1852)
- Markiian Shashkevych (1811–1843)
- Ivan Vahylevych (1811––1866)
- Yevhen Hrebinka (1812–1848)
- Izmail Sreznevskyi (1812–1880)
- Taras Shevchenko (1814–1861)
- Amvrosii Metlynskyi (1814–1870)
- Yakiv Holovatskyi (1814–1888)
- Mykhailo Petrenko (1817–1862)
- Oleksandr Afanasiev-Chuzhbynskyi (1817–1875)
- Mykola Kostomarov (1817–1885)
- Panteleimon Kulish (1819–1897)
- Leonid Hlibov (1827–1893)
- Bohdan Didytskyi (1827–1909)
- Hanna Barvinok (1828–1911)
- Danylo Mordovets (1830–1905)
- Marko Vovchok (1833–1907)
- Stepan Rudanskyi (1834–1873)
- Yuriy Fedkovych (1834–1888)
- Oleksandr Konyskyi (1836–1900)
- Sydir Vorobkevych (1836–1903)
- Ivan Nechuy-Levytskyi (1838–1918)
- Kornylo Ustiyanovych (1839–1903)
- Mykhailo Starytskyi (1840–1904)
- Marko Kropyvnytskyi (1840–1910)
- Pavlyn Svientsitskyi (1841–1876)
- Khrystyna Alchevska (1841–1920)
- Ivan Karpenko-Karyi (1845–1907)
- Orest Levytskyi (1848–1922)
- Panas Myrnyi (1849–1920)
- Olena Pchilka (1849–1930)
- Natalia Kobrynska (1855–1920)
- Ivan Franko (1856–1916)
- Andrii Chaikovskyi (1857–1935)
- Adrian Kashchenko (1858–1921)
- Uliana Kravchenko (1860–1947)
- Dniprova Chayka (1861–1928)
- Lyubov Yanovska (1861–1933)
- Petro Stebnytskyi (1862–1923)
- Borys Hrinchenko (1863–1910)
- Hrytsko Kernerenko (1863–1941)
- Olha Kobylianska (1863–1942)
- Pavlo Hrabovskyi (1864–1902)
- Mykhailo Kotsiubynskyi (1864–1913)
- Volodymyr Samiilenko (1864–1925)
- Hrytsko Hryhorenko (1867–1924)
- Osyp Makovei (1867–1925)
- Liudmyla Starytska-Cherniakhivska (1868–1941)
- Lesia Ukrainka (1871–1913)

== 20th century ==
- Vasyl Stefanyk (1871–1936)
- Mykola Voronyi (1871–1938)
- Ahatanhel Krymskyi (1871–1942)
- Vasyl Shchurat (1871–1948)
- Dmytro Verhun (1871–1951)
- Bohdan Lepkyi (1872–1941)
- Marko Cheremshyna (1874–1927)
- Katria Hrynevycheva (1875–1947)
- Hnat Khotkevych (1877–1938)
- Antin Krushelnytskyi (1878–1937)
- Oleksandr Oles (1878–1944)
- Osyp Turianskyi (1880–1933)
- Volodymyr Vynnychenko (1880–1951)
- Stepan Charnetskyi (1881–1944)
- Mykola Chaikovskyi (1887–1970)
- Natalena Koroleva (1888–1966)
- Mykhailo Drai-Khmara (1889–1939)
- Ostap Vyshnia (1889–1956)
- Mykola Zerov (1890–1937)
- Klym Polishchuk (1891–1937)
- Yurii Klen (1891–1947)
- Pavlo Tychyna (1891–1967)
- Petro Panch (1891–1978)
- Mykhail Semenko (1892–1937)
- Mykola Kulish (1892–1937)
- Stepan Tudor (1892–1941)
- Mykola Khvyliovyi (1893–1933)
- Vasyl Ellan-Blakytnyi (1894–1925)
- Oleksandr Dovzhenko (1894–1956)
- V. Domontovych (1894–1969)
- Mykhailo Yalovyi (1895–1937)
- Maik Yohansen (1895–1937)
- Todos Osmachka (1895–1962)
- Maksym Rylskyi (1895–1964)
- Ivan Le (1895–1978)
- Ivan Kulyk (1897–1937)
- Valerian Polishchuk (1897–1937)
- Myroslav Irchan (1897–1937)
- Leonid Mosendz (1897–1948)
- Yevhen Malaniuk (1897–1968)
- Yevhen Pluzhnyk (1898–1936)
- Volodymyr Sosiura (1898–1965)
- Hryhorii Kosynka (1899–1934)
- Borys Antonenko-Davydovych (1899–1984)
- Yurii Lypa (1900–1944)
- Yurii Smolych (1900–1976)
- Vasyl Chumak (1901–1919)
- Hryhorii Epik (1901–1937)
- Valerian Pidmohylnyi (1901–1937)
- Volodymyr Vladko (1901–1974)
- Yaroslav Halan (1902–1949)
- Yuriy Yanovskyi (1902–1954)
- Oksana Liaturynska (1902–1970)
- Geo Shkurupii (1903–1937)
- Natalia Zabila (1903–1985)
- Mykola Bazhan (1904–1983)
- Dokiya Humenna (1904–1996)
- Oleksandr Korniichuk (1905–1972)
- Olena Teliha (1906–1942)
- Ivan Bahrianyi (1906–1963)
- Oleh Olzhych (1907–1944)
- Iryna Vilde (1907–1982)
- Leonid Pervomaiskyi (1908–1973)
- Vasyl Barka (1908–2003)
- Bohdan-Ihor Antonych (1909–1937)
- Theodore Odrach (1912–1964)
- Andriy Malyshko (1912–1970)
- Mykhailo Stelmakh (1912–1983)
- Natan Rybak (1913–1978)
- Ihor Kostetskyi (1913–1983)
- Platon Voronko (1913–1988)
- Oles Honchar (1918–1995)
- Igor Kaczurowskyj (1918–2013)
- Mykola Rudenko (1920–2004)
- Anatoliy Dimarov (1922–2014)
- Pavlo Zahrebelnyi (1924–2009)
- Oles Berdnyk (1926–2003)
- Vira Vovk (1926–2022)
- Yevhen Sverstiuk (1928–2014)
- Ihor Rosokhovatskyi (1929–2015)
- Yurii Mushketyk (1929–2019)
- Zhenia Vasylkivska (1929–2021)
- Dmytro Pavlychko (1929–2023)
- Vsevolod Nestaiko (1930–2014)
- Hryhir Tiutiunnyk (1931–1980)
- Eliáš Galajda (1931–2017)
- Ivan Dziuba (1931–2022)
- Volodymyr Savchenko (1933–2005)
- Yuriy Tarnawsky (1934–2025)
- Vasyl Symonenko (1935–1963)
- Borys Oliinyk (1935–2017)
- Mykola Vinhranovskyi (1936–2004)
- Ivan Drach (1936–2018)
- Patricia Kilina (1936–2019)
- Yevhen Hutsalo (1937–1995)
- Vasyl Stus (1938–1985)
- Ihor Kalynets (1939–2025)
- Valeriy Shevchuk (1939–2025)
- Iryna Kalynets (1940–2012)
- Yurii Pokalchuk (1941–2008)
- Ivan Korsak (1946–2017)
- Moysey Fishbein (1946–2020)
- Hrytsko Chubai (1949–1982)
- Oleh Lysheha (1949–2014)
- Roman Babowal (1950–2005)
- Ihor Rymaruk (1958–2008)
- Oles Ulianenko (1962-2010)

== 21st century ==
- Lina Kostenko (born 1930)
- Emma Andijewska (born 1931)
- Yurii Shcherbak (born 1934)
- Oleh Koverko (born 1937)
- Pavlo Movchan (born 1939)
- Mykola Vorobyov (born 1941)
- Maryna (born 1968) and Serhiy Diachenko (1945–2022)
- Vasyl Holoborodko (born 1945)
- Viktor Morozov (born 1950)
- Vasyl Shkliar (born 1951)
- Yurii Vynnychuk (born 1952)
- Les Podervianskyi (born 1952)
- Mykola Riabchuk (born 1953)
- Lesia Voronyna (born 1955)
- Andriy Valentynov (born 1958)
- Petro Midyanka (born 1959)
- Maria Matios (born 1959)
- Oksana Zabuzhko (born 1960)
- Yurii Andrukhovych (born 1960)
- Oleksandr Irvanets (born 1961)
- Andrey Kurkov (born 1961)
- Ivan Malkovych (born 1961)
- Yurii Izdryk (born 1962)
- H. L. Oldie (born 1963)
- Volodymyr Tsybulko (born 1964)
- Vasyl Makhno (born 1964)
- Stepan Protsiuk (born 1964)
- Ihor Pavliuk (born 1967)
- Taras Prokhasko (born 1968)
- Halyna Petrosaniak (born 1969)
- Volodymyr Vakulenko (1972–2022)
- Natalka Sniadanko (born 1973)
- Alexander Zorich (born 1973)
- Marianna Kiianovska (born 1973)
- Andriy Bondar (born 1974)
- Oksana Lutsyshyna (born 1974)
- Serhii Zhadan (born 1974)
- Halyna Kruk (born 1974)
- Svitlana Pyrkalo (born 1976)
- Pavlo Arie (born 1977)
- Volodymyr Arenev (born 1978)
- Dmytro Lazutkin (born 1978)
- Dzvinka Matiiash (born 1978)
- Maryna Sokolian (born 1979)
- Irena Karpa (born 1980)
- Anna Bahriana (born 1981)
- Sofia Andrukhovych (born 1982)
- Iryna Tsilyk (born 1982)
- Tania Maliarchuk (born 1983)
- Max Kidruk (born 1984)
- Liubko Deresh (born 1984)
- Victoria Amelina (1986–2023)
- Iryna Shuvalova (born 1986)
- Anrii Liubka (born 1987)
- Markiian Kamysh (born 1988)
- Myroslav Laiuk (born 1990)
- Natalia Matolinets (born 1990)

== See also ==
- List of Ukrainian-language writers
- List of Ukrainian-language poets
