= Contemporary Ukrainian literature =

Ukrainian literature after the collapse of the Soviet Union

Contemporary Ukrainian literature refers to Ukrainian literature since 1991, the year of both Ukrainian independence and the collapse of the Soviet Union. From that year on, censorship in the Soviet Union ceased to exist and writers were able to break openly with the official socialist realism style of art, music, and literature. Principal changes had taken place in Ukrainian literature already under Perestroika (1985) and especially after the Chernobyl disaster. Some researchers consider that modern Ukrainian literature was born during the 1970s and founded by Soviet dissidents from the sixties generation.

Due to the increased freedom and openness of Ukrainian society to foreign influences and much broader access to the literatures of other countries, contemporary Ukrainian literature is different from the literature of the Soviet and Classical periods. Writers often turn to previously forbidden topics (Holodomor, sexuality, drugs, deviant behavior, etc.), using new styles (postmodernism, neo avant-garde, profanity, surzhyk), diversity and mixing of genres, shocking effects and reflecting upon social problems and historical memory.

Modern Ukraine also has a significant number of Russophone writers, who are especially successful in the genres of science fiction and fantasy.

== History ==
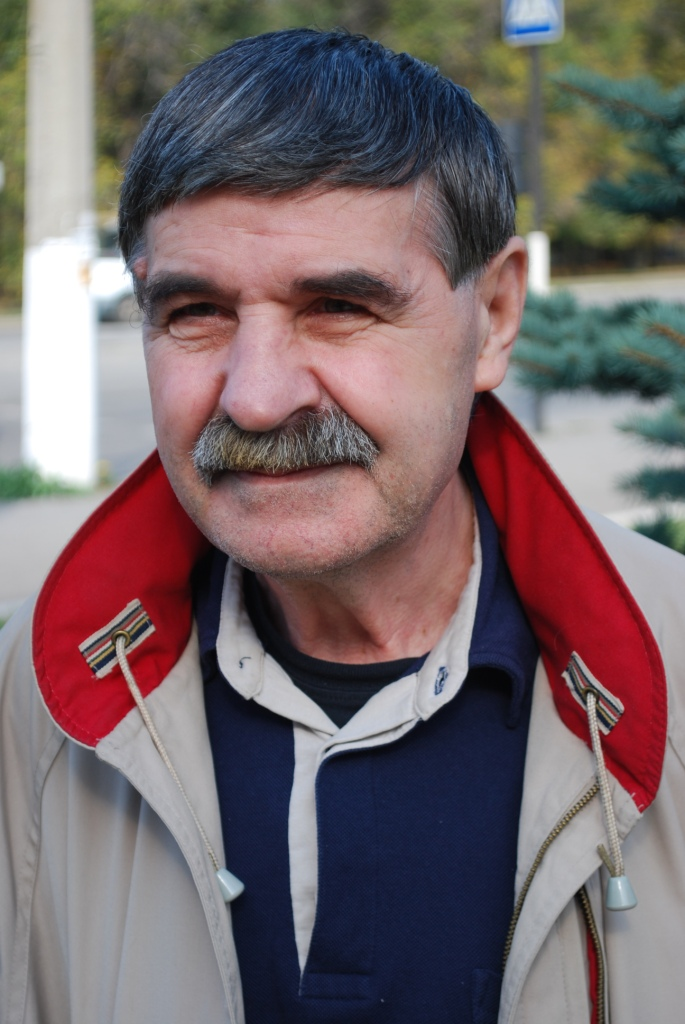
Vasyl Holoborodko a student of the Kyiv School of Poetry.

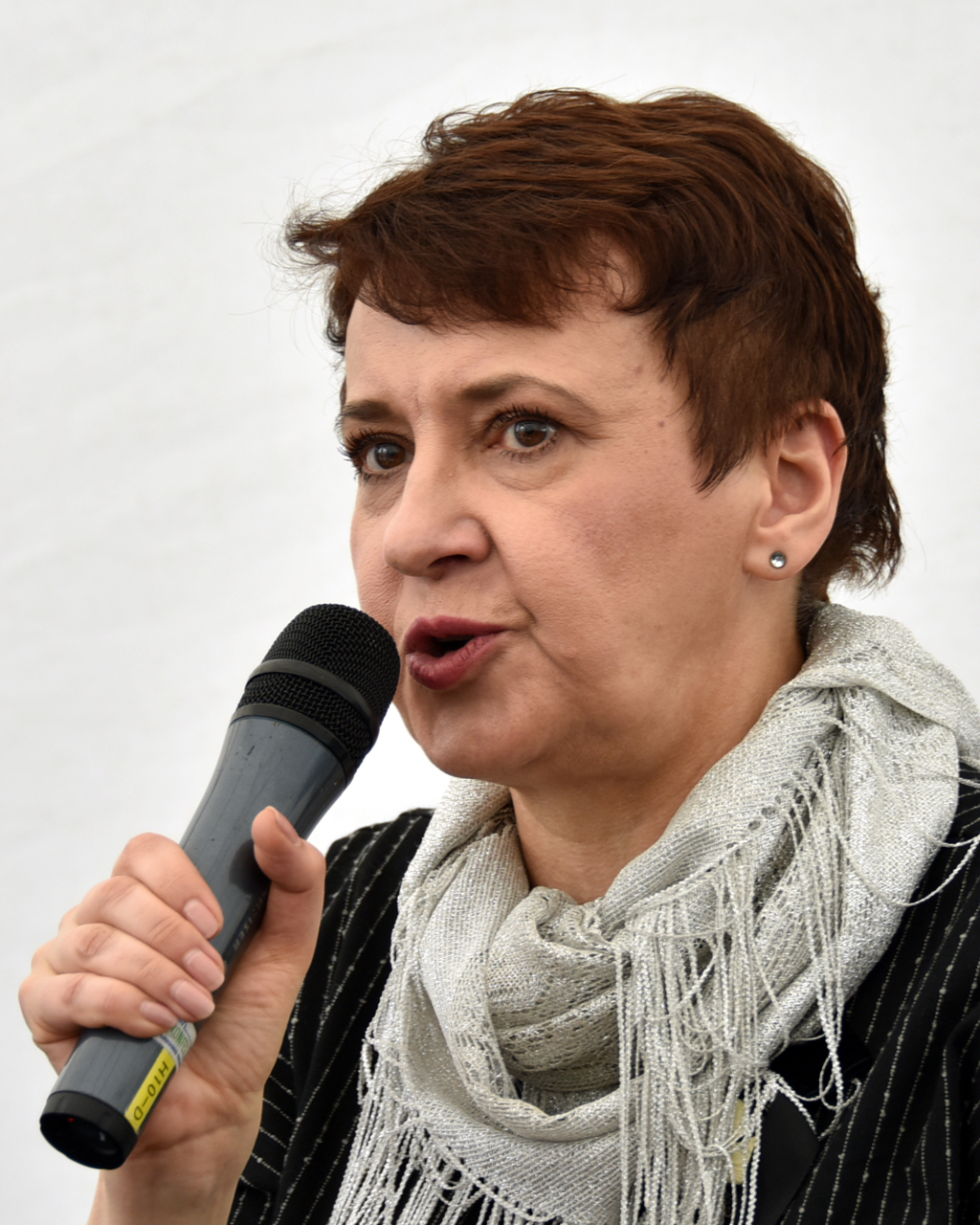
Oksana Zabuzhko.

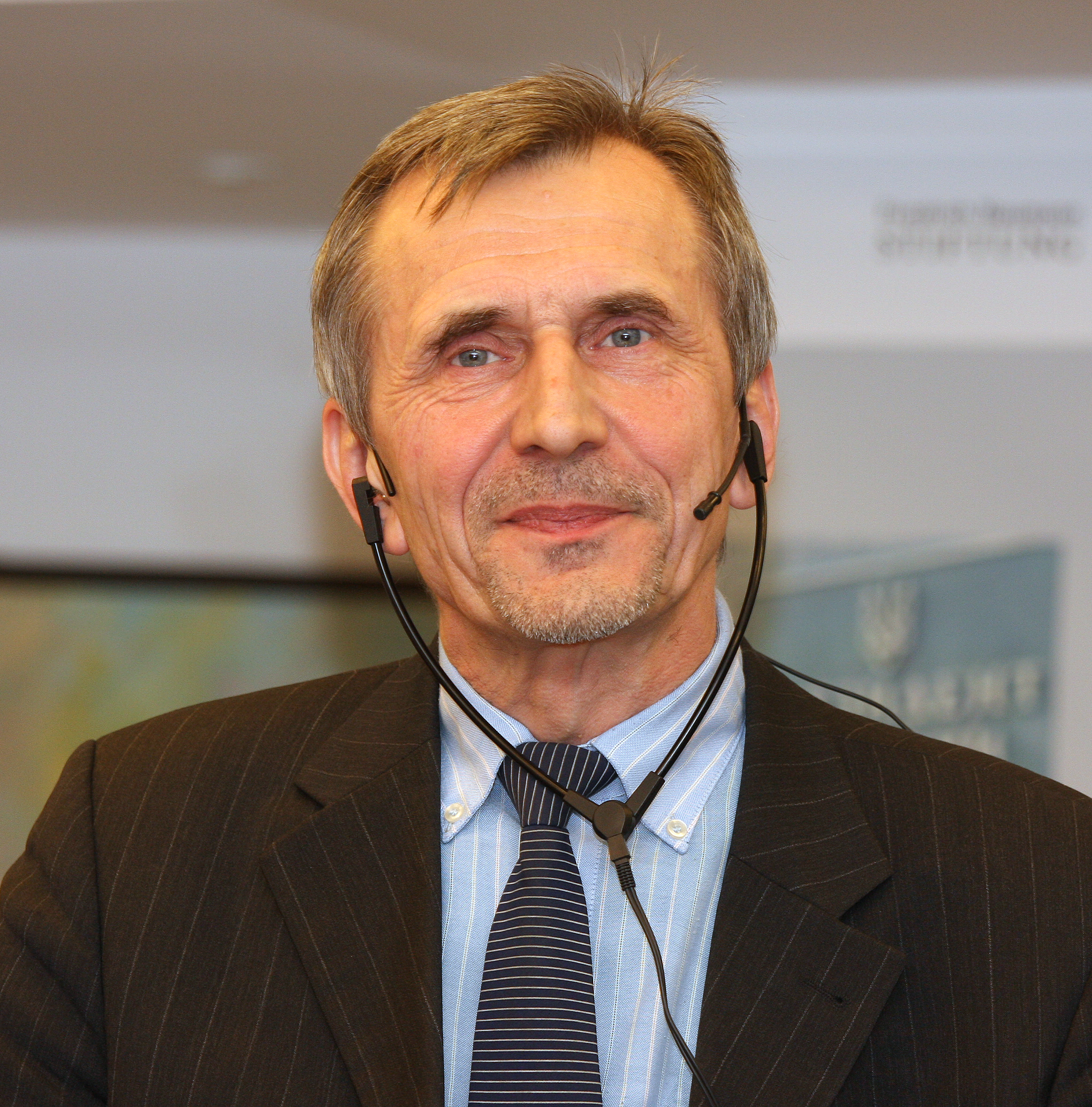
Mykola Rjabtschuk

As part of the Great Turn, Modernism in Ukrainian literature was snuffed out by new Soviet general secretary Joseph Stalin's systematic murder of the writers and poets who, under the post-1917 policies of Korenizatsiya and Ukrainianization, had created a literary movement that is now called the Executed Renaissance. Except in the Ukrainian diaspora, however, censorship, coercive socialist realism, forced Russification, and literary stagnation immediately followed and continued for decades. This has led many more recent Ukrainian authors to write in classical, modernist, or postmodernist styles to fill the historic void on their own terms.

During the later USSR some Ukrainian writers started to deviate from the officially approved literary style of socialist realism. Among these writers were Valeriy Shevchuk with his psychological prose and the authors of Chymeric Prose (Vasyl Zemlyak and Volodymyr Drozd) similar to magical realism. There existed also underground literary circles like the Kyiv school of poetry (Vasyl Holoborodko, Mykola Vorobyov, Viktor Kordun, Mykhaylo Hryhoriv), a circle of Lviv writers around the samizdat "Skrynya" almanac (Hryhoriy Chubay, Oleh Lysheha, Mykola Riabchuk, Viktor Morozov, Roman Kis, Orest Yavorskyi), separate dissident writers like Ihor Kalynets. Authors belonging to Kyiv ironic school (Volodymr Dibrova, Bohdan Zholdak, Les Podervianskyi) are considered to be the forefathers of Postmodernism in Ukrainian literature.

With advent of Perestroika, the censorship of all Soviet writers weakened. This allowed Ukrainian poets and writers to turn to previously prohibited styles, subjects, and themes.

The Ukrainian literary canon also had to be revised and the banned works from the 1920s "Executed Renaissance", from anti-communist writers and poets in the Ukrainian diaspora, and from Samizdat writers were openly published at long last.

Following the failure of the August coup against General Secretary Mikhail Gorbachev and the successful Ukrainian Declaration of Independence in August 1991, the Ukrainian people faced a decade of substantial social changes. Private sector publishing had to fill the vacuum left by the State-controlled publishing system, which had only supported and published writers considered blindly loyal and obedient to the Soviet regime.

The role of a writer in society was also reexamined. Regime loyal poets and writers in the Soviet Union had played a very specific social and political function, which the new postmodernist writers (especially the Bu-Ba-Bu group of poets including Yuri Andrukhovych, Viktor Neborak and Oleksandr Irvanets) began to satirise and debunk.

Some of the centers of the new Ukrainian literature were situated away from the political capital of Kyiv. The Stanislaviv Phenomenon emerged in Ivano-Frankivsk and included a group of eminent writers like Yuri Andrukhovych, Yuriy Izdryk, Taras Prokhasko, Halyna Petrosanyak and Mariya Mykytsey.

Mykola Riabchuk was an influential figure in Ukrainian literature in the end of 1980-s and beginning of 1990-s. He edited "Suchasnist", the most influential literary journal at that period. Thanks to Riabchuk many still to become famous writers were first published.

Contemporary Ukrainian literature has also been influenced by writers from the Ukrainian diaspora, and especially by the 1950s–1970s New York Group of Ukrainian Poets, who embraced literary modernism, surrealism, existentialism and many other trends in Western literature, while separating their politics from their art. Another influence is the now freely published work of Soviet dissidents and writers from the sixtiers generation, who had escaped censorship by circulating their writings via Samizdat, which they also used to call attention to religious persecution, the enforced Russification of Ukraine, and many other human rights abuses in Soviet Ukraine.

== Features ==
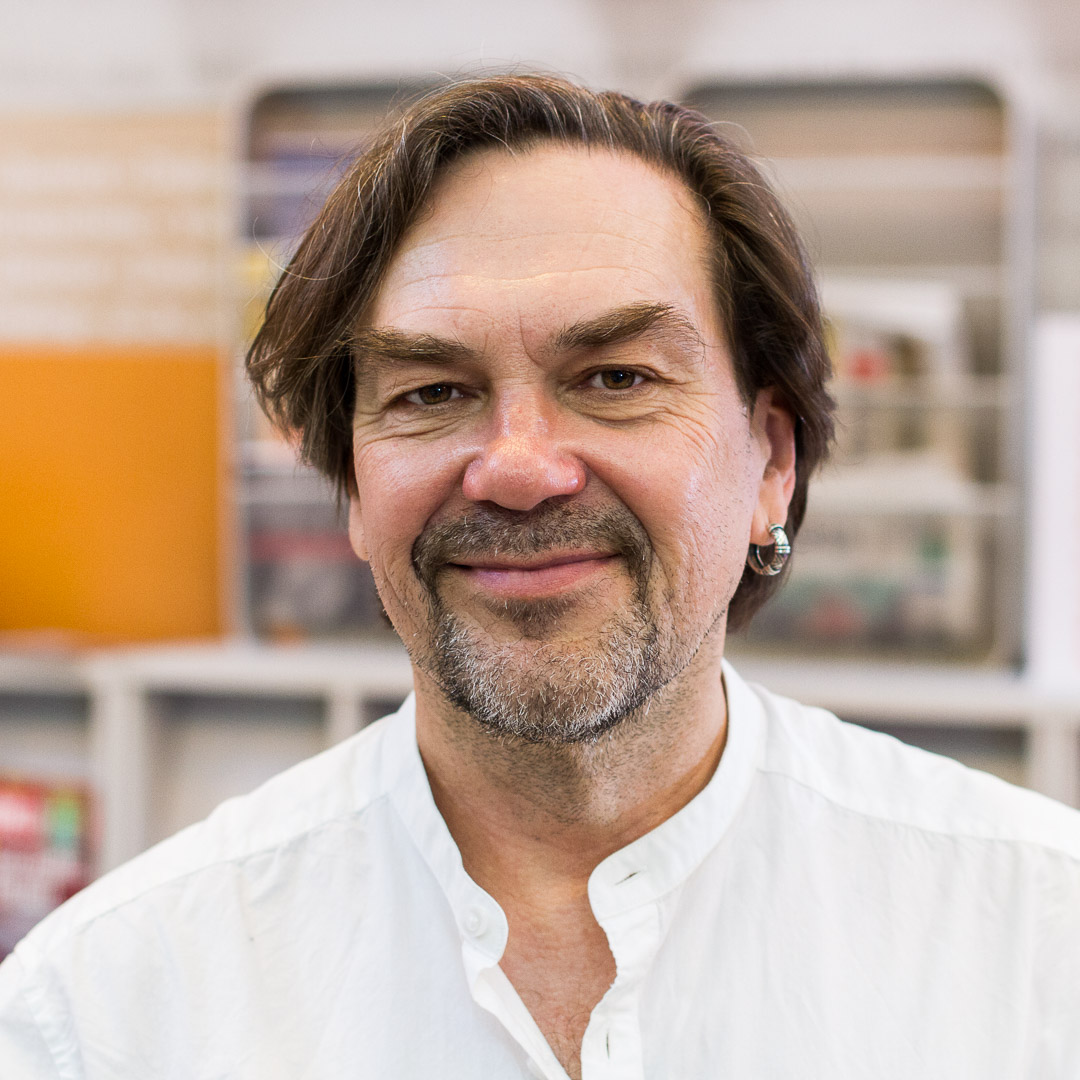
Yuri Andrukhovych

Many works of contemporary poets and writers concentrate on the darker sides of human life, such as violence and crisis. This is a reaction to decades of false but compulsory optimism in Soviet literature.

There are numerous literary festivals in Ukraine, most important are the Lviv international literary festival, Meridian Czernowitz and Kyivski lavry.

For comic effect, some post-independence Ukrainian authors choose to write in a pidgin language composed of mixed Russian and Ukrainian called surzhyk (Bohdan Zholdak, Les Podervianskyi, Volodymyr Dibrova, Mykhaylo Brynykh), as surzhyk is increasingly the language of the marginalized.

A number of writers in Ukraine continue to write in Russian. Andriy Kurkov is the best known of them. Also a great number of contemporary Russian language science fiction writers are originally from Ukraine or still live there (H. L. Oldie, Alexander Zorich, Yuri Nikitin, Andrey Valentinov, Marina and Sergey Dyachenko and Vladimir Arenev).

== Poetry ==
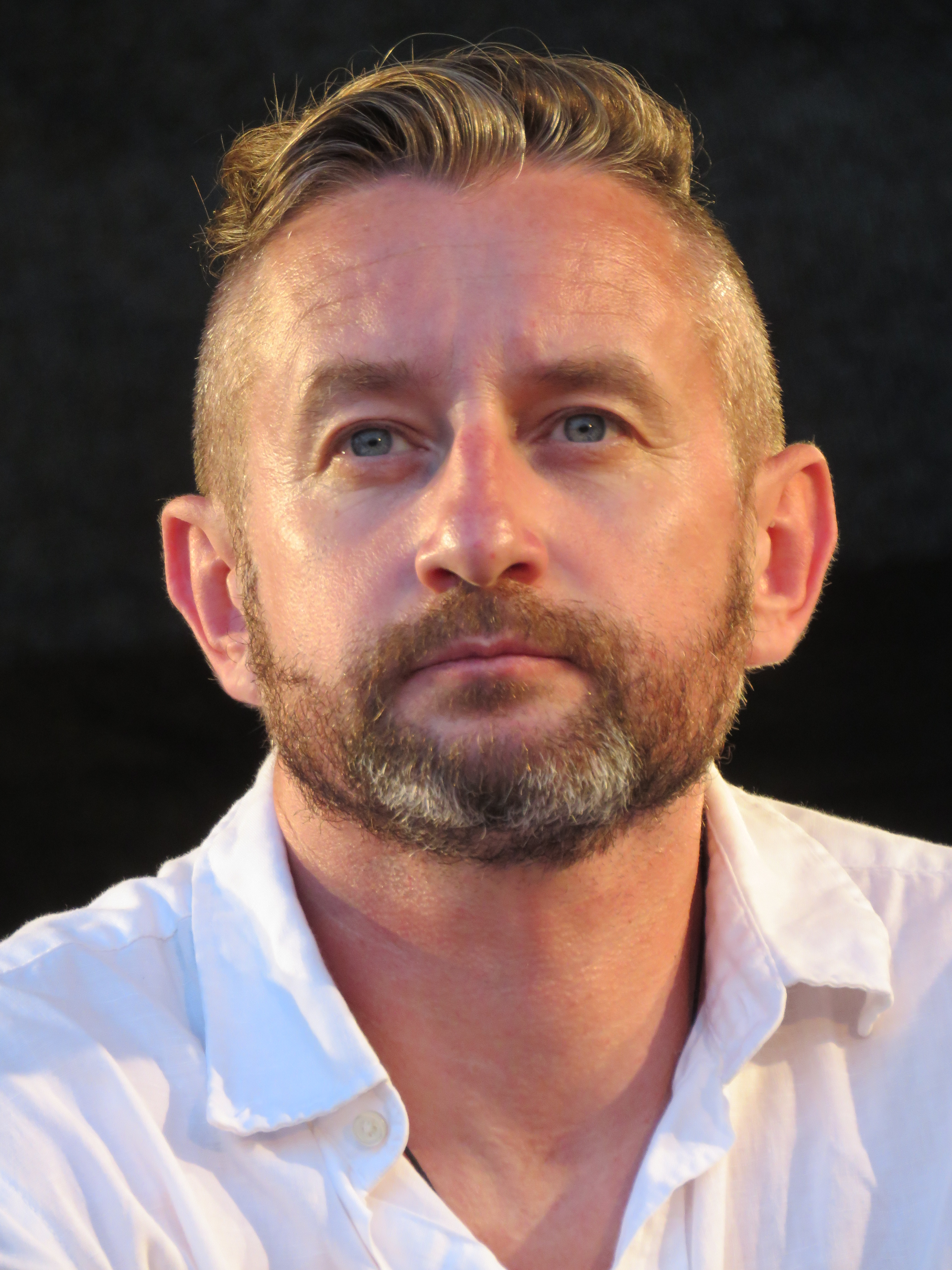
Serhiy Zhadan

Among the well-known Ukrainian poets are Yuri Andrukhovych, Les Beley, Andriy Bondar, Vasyl Herasymyuk, Vasyl Holoborodko, Marianna Kiyanovska, Pavlo Korobchuk, Oleh Kotsarev, Halyna Kruk, Dmytro Lazutkin, Oleh Lysheha, Andriy Lyubka, Ivan Malkovych, Bohdana Matiyash, Petro Midyanka, Kost Moskalets, Ihor Pavlyuk, Ihor Rymaruk, Iryna Shuvalova, Myroslav Laiuk, Ostap Slyvynskyi, Volodymyr Tsybulko, Oksana Zabuzhko, Serhiy Zhadan.

== Prose ==
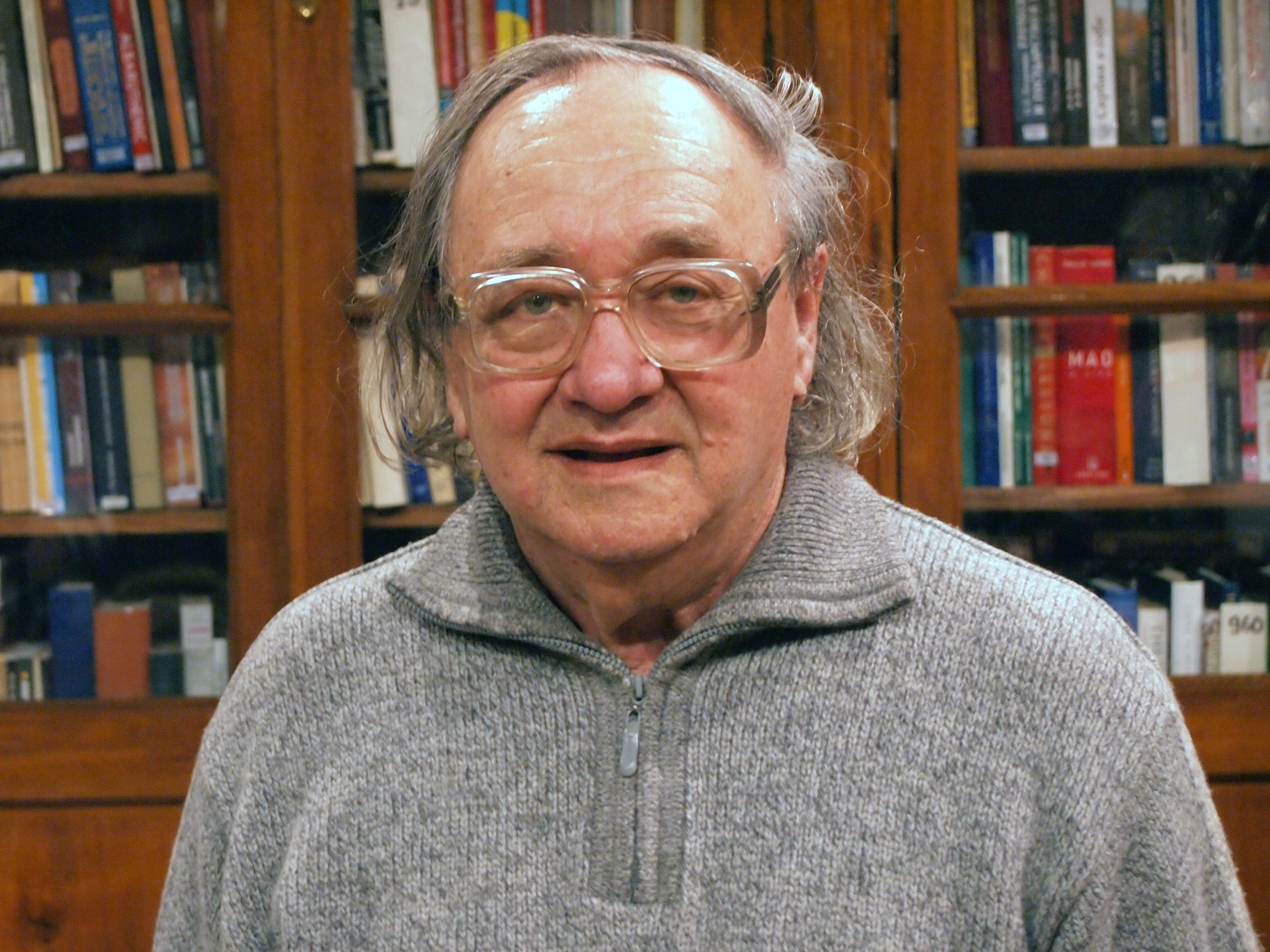
Valeriy Shevchuk

Prose writers: Valeriy Shevchuk, Volodymyr Dibrova, Yuriy Vynnychuk, Yuriy Hudz, Yuri Andrukhovych, Oksana Zabuzhko, Yuri Pokalchuk, Yuriy Izdryk, Yevhen Pashkovskyi, Oles Ulianenko, Stepan Protsyuk, Taras Prokhasko, Natalka Sniadanko, Serhiy Zhadan, Anatoliy Dnistrovyi, Dzvinka Matiyash, Myroslav Laiuk, Irena Karpa, Tanya Malyarchuk, Lyubko Deresh, Markiyan Kamysh, Victoria Amelina, Iryna Tsilyk, Oleksiy Chupa.

Well known essayists: Ivan Korsak, Mykola Riabchuk, Vitaliy Zhezhera, Yuri Andrukhovych, Oksana Zabuzhko, Vasyl Makhno, Oleksandr Boychenko, Yurko Prokhasko, Anatoliy Dnistrovyi, Andriy Bondar.

Notable novels: Fieldwork in Ukrainian Sex (1996) by Oksana Zabuzhko, Perverzion (1997) by Yuri Andrukhovych, Wozzek by Yuriy Izdryk, Sweet Darusya (2002) by Maria Matios, Stalking the Atomic City: Life Among the Decadent and the Depraved of Chornobyl (2015) by Markiyan Kamysh.

== Drama ==
Drama writers: Oleksandr Irvanets, Nadiya Symych, Neda Nezhdana, Les Podervianskyi, Pavlo Arie, Anna Bahriana, Olena Klymenko, Oleh Mykolaychuk-Nyzovets, Serhiy Shchuchenko, Artem Vyshnevskyi, Oleksandra Pohrebinska, Oleksa Slipets, Volodymyr Serdyuk, Ihor Pavlyuk.

== Translations into English ==
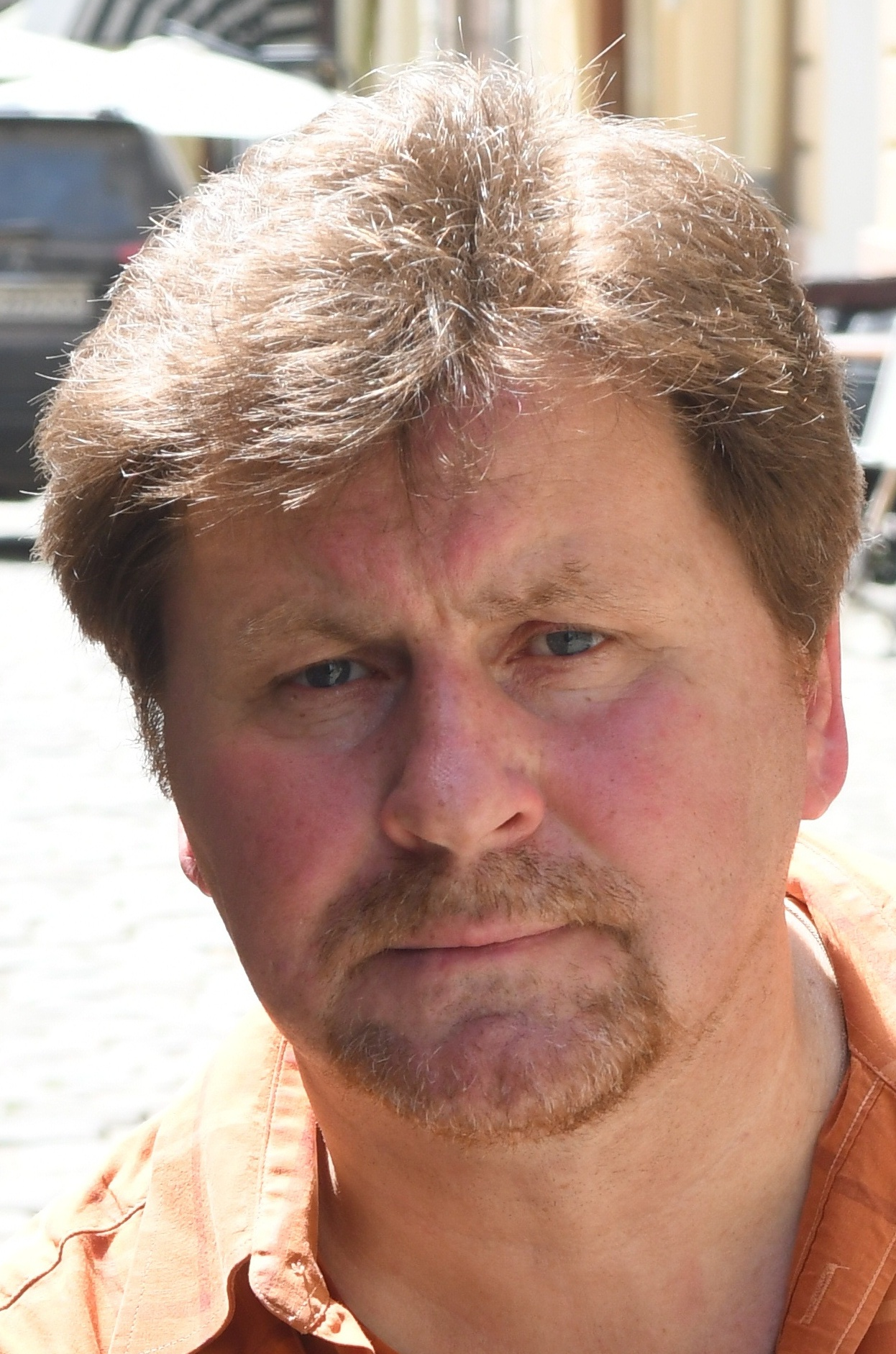
Ihor Pavlyuk

Many books by Yuri Andrukhovych, Oksana Zabuzhko, Serhiy Zhadan and Ihor Pavlyuk have been translated into English.

Ukrainian poet Ihor Pavlyuk was the winner of the 2013 English PEN Award. His book "A Flight over the Black Sea" became the winning book in the Writers in Translation competition organized by English PEN club. Academia.edu has included book "A Flight over the Black Sea" in the authoritative list "The Greatest Great Books List Ever".

The Ukrainian Literature magazine publishes English translations of contemporary writers. A special issue of the International Poetry Review was dedicated to Ukrainian poetry spanning from 1985 to 2010. Among active Ukrainian-English translators are Michael Naydan, Mark Andryczyk, Steve Komarnyckyj, Vitaly Chernetsky and others.

=== Anthologies of contemporary Ukrainian literature in English translation ===
- From Three Worlds. New Writing from Ukraine. Ed Hogan. Boston: Zephyr Press, 1996.
- Two lands, new visions: stories from Canada and Ukraine. Janice Kulyk Keefer, Solomea Pavlychko. Regina Saskatchewan: Coteau Books, 1998.
- Half a breath: a brief anthology of young Ukrainian writers. Teka Publishing House, 2009.
- AU/UA Contemporary poetry of Ukraine and Australia. Ternopil-Sydney: Krok, Meuse Press, 2011.
- Herstories: An Anthology Of New Ukrainian Women Prose Writers. Ed. by Michael M. Naydan. Tilburg and London: Glagoslav Publications, 2013.
- Words for War: New Poems from Ukraine. Ed. by Oksana Maksymchuk & Max Rosochinsky. Boston: Academic Studies Press, 2017.
- The Frontier: 28 Contemporary Ukrainian Poets. Ed. and transl. by Anatoly Kudryavitsky. Tilburg and London: Glagoslav Publications, 2017.
- The White Chalk of Days: The Contemporary Ukrainian Literature Series Anthology. Ed. by Mark Andryczyk. Boston: Academic Studies Press, 2017.
- Sunflowers Rising: Poems For Peace Anthology, 2025.

== See also ==
- List of Ukrainian literature translated into English

== Literature ==
- Vitaly Chernetsky. Mapping Postcommunist Cultures: Russia and Ukraine in the Context of Globalization. Mcgill Queens University Press, 2007.
- Mark Andryczyk. The Intellectual as Hero in 1990s Ukrainian Fiction. Toronto: University of Toronto Press, 2012.
- Contemporary Ukraine on the Cultural Map of Europe. Ed. by L.M.L. Zaleska Onyshkevych and M.G. Rewakowicz. – M.E. Sharpe, 2009. ISBN 978-0-7656-2400-0
- Solomiya Pavlychko. A Catfish for Your Thoughts: Ukrainian Literature at the Turning Point, 1994 // «Теорія літератури», К.: Основи — 2002, С. 525–533.
- Solomiya Pavlychko. Facing Freedom: The New Ukrainian Literature, 1996 // «Теорія літератури», К.: Основи — 2002, С. 553–559.
- Solomiya Pavlychko. Introduction (Two Lands New Visions: Stories from Canada and Ukraine), 1998 // «Теорія літератури», К.: Основи — 2002, С. 583–588.
