= List of Ukrainian-language poets =

The following is a list of Ukrainian-language poets (chronological by year of birth).

== 16th century ==
Poet	Portrait	Date	Birthplace	Notable Works
Jan Zhoravnytskyi		15??-1589	Lutsk (?), Grand Duchy of Lithuania or Kingdom of Poland	"Khto ydesh mymo, stan' hodynu..." (1575)
Herasym Smotrytskyi		15??-1594	Smotrychi (?), Podolian Voivodeship, Grand Duchy of Lithuania or Kingdom of Poland	"Zry siia znameniia kniazhate slavnaho..." (1580–81), "Vsiakoho chyna pravoslavyi chytateliu..." (1580-81)
Pamvo Berynda		1550s-70s - 1632		religious panegyrical poetry
Vitalii		second half of the 16th century - early 17th century		Religious poetry
Kyrylo Tankvilion-Stavrovetskyi		15??-1646		Panegyrical poetry
Kasiian Sakovych		1578-1647	Podtelychi, Bielsk county, Galicia	Panegyrical poems for Hetman Petro Sahaidachnyi
Oleksandr Mytura		late 16th - first half of the 17 century		Religious poetry
Stepan Berynda		late 16th - first half of the 17 century		Religious and panegyrical poetry
Havryiil Dorofiievych			Lviv (?), Galicia	Religious and panegyrical poetry
Damian Nalyvaiko		-1627	Ternopil region (?), Grand Duchy of Lithuania or Kingdom of Poland	Panegyrical poems for the Ostrogski dynasty
Davyd Andriievych				Religious poetry
Tarasii Zemka		-1632	Galicia, Ruthenian Voivodeship	Panegyrical poetry
Pavlo Domzhyv-Liutkovych		-1634		Religious poetry
Avraam Biloborodskyi		-17th century		"Nynu veselyi nam den' nastal"
Lavrentii Zyzanii		16th century-after 1634	Lviv (?), Ruthenian Voivodeship, Polish-Lithuanian Commonwealth	"Epihramma na Hrammatiku", "Stikhy ku mladentsiem, vuvudiashchiy ikh na dulo", "Typohraf mladentsiem"

== 17th century ==
Poet	Portrait	Date	Birthplace	Notable Works
Ivan Velychkovskyi		16??-1726	Cossack Hetmanate (?)	Virshi het’manovi Samoilovychevi (Poems for Hetman Ivan Samoilovych) and two manuscript collections of old-Ukrainian poetry, ‘Zegar ...’ (Clock ..., 1690) and ‘Mleko ...’ (Milk ..., 1691)
Petro Popovych-Huchenskyi		second half of the 17th century	Terebovlia region(?), Western Podolia, Polish-Lithuanian Commonwealth	Virshi Nyshchens'kii
Stefan Yavorskyi		1658-1722	Yavoriv, Polish-Lithuanian Commonwealth	
Theofan Prokopovych		1681-1736	Kyiv, Cossack Hetmanate	
Illia Bachynskyi		late 17th - early 18th century	western Ukraine	"Pisn svitova"

== 18th century ==
Poet	Portrait	Date	Birthplace	Notable Works
Oleksandr Padalskyi		18th century	Transcarpathia (?)	"Pisn' o sviti" (Song about the world, 18th century)
Ivan Pashkovskyi		18th century	Myshkovychi, Ternopil Region (?)	"Poky zh dumaty, bozhe, dai znaty" (1764), "Musysh ty sia pryznaty", "Tiazhkaia rich liubyty", "Okh, mni zhal ne pomalu"
Fedir Kastevych		18th century		"Pisnia o sviti marnom"
Yakiv Semerzhynskyi		18th century		"Kara z neba, sertse moie, yak zhadaiu...", religious poetry
Vasyl Pashkovskyi		18th century		"Pisn o bidnom syroti"
Ioann		18th century		"O slvanykh voienykh diisviiakh voisk zaporozkykh vkratsi z raznykh istorii prostorichno sochyneni" (1784)
Semen Klymovskyi		1705 (?) -1785 (?)	left bank Cossack Hetmanate or Lower Zaporozhian Host	"Ikhav kozak za dunai" (A Cossack rode beyond the Danube, mid 18th century)
Hryhorii Skovoroda		1722-1794	Lubny Regiment, Cossack Hetmanate	The Garden of Divine Songs that Sprang from the Seeds of Holy Scripture
Antin Holovatyi		c. 1732-1744 - 1797	Novi Sanzhary, Cossack Hetmanate	"Oi bozhe nash, bozhe mylostyvyi", Ei, hodi nam zhurytysia, pora perestaty" (Song of the Black Sea Army upon receiving the highest decrees on land, 1792)
Ivan Pastelii		1741-1799	Transcarpathia	"Pastyriu dushevnyi"
Ivan Nekrashevych		1742- after 1796	Vyshenky, Chernihiv regiment, Cossack Hetmanate	‘Spor dushi i tila’ (The Struggle of the Soul and the Flesh, 1773), versified dialogue ‘Ispovid'’ (Confession, 1789), and ‘Iarmarok’ (The Marketplace, 1790)
Yuliyan Dobrylovskyi		c. 1760-1825	Zinkiv, Polish-Lithuanian Commonwealth	"Dai, zhe Bozhe, dobryi chas" (Lord grant us a good time) and "Stan'mo brattia v kolo" (Let's gather in a circle brothers)
Ivan Kotliarevskyi		1769-1838	Poltava, Russian Empire	Eneida (1789), Natalka Poltavka (1819)
Vasyl Gogol-Yanovskyi		c. 1777-1825	Kubyntsi, Malorossia Governorate, Russian Empire	
Stepan Pysarevskyi		178?-1839	Sloboda Ukraine Governorate, Russian Empire	‘Za Neman' idu’ [I’m Going beyond the Neman], ‘De ty brodysh moia dole?’ [Where Are You Roaming, My Fate?]
Petro Hulak-Artemovskyi		1790-1865	Horodyshche, Novorossiya Governorate Russian Empire	‘Rybalka’ (The Fisherman) and ‘Tvardovs’kyi’
Yakiv Kukharenko		1799-1862	Stanytsia Medvedivska, Kuban Region	"Kharko, zaporoz'kyi koshovyi" (Kharko, the zaporozhian Kish Otaman)

== 19th century ==
Poet	Portrait	Date	Birthplace	Notable Works
Mykola Markevych		1804-1860	Dunaiets, Chernigov Governorate, Russian Empire	Ukrainskiia melodii (Ukrainian Melodies, 1831)
Levko Borovykovskyi		1806-1889	Myliushky, Poltava Governorate, Russian Empire	'Marusia' (1829)
Viktor Zabila		1808-1869	Kukurivshchyna estate (now Zabilivshchyna), Borzna county, Chernigov Governorate, Russian Empire	‘Hude viter vel’my v poli’ (The Wind Is Blowing Much in the Field) and ‘Ne shchebechy soloveiku’ (Don't Sing, Nightingale)
Markiyan Shashkevych		1811-1843	Pidlyssia, Złoczów Powiat, Kingdom of Galicia and Lodomeria, Austrian Empire	
Ivan Vahylevych		1811-1866	Yasen (today in Kalush Raion), Stanisławów Powiat, Kingdom of Galicia and Lodomeria, Austrian Empire	
Antin Mohylnytskyi		1811-1873	Pidhirtsi, near Kalush, Stryi county, Kingdom of Galicia and Lodomeria, Austrian Empire	
Yevhen Hrebinka		1812-1848	Ubizhyshche, (today – Marianivka), Poltava Governorate, Russian Empire	‘Ukrainskaia melodiia’ (A Ukrainian Melody, 1839)
Yakiv Holovatskyi		1814-1888	Chepeli, Kingdom of Galicia and Lodomeria, Austrian Empire	
Taras Shevchenko		1814-1861	Moryntsi, Zvenyhorodka Raion, Kiev Governorate, Russian Empire	Kobzar
Amvrosii Metlynskyi		1814-1870	Sary, Hadiach county, Poltava Governorate, Russian Empire	Dumky i pisni ta shche deshcho (Thoughts and Songs and Some Other Things, 1839)
Kostiantyn Dumytrashko		1814-1886	Zolotonosha, Poltava Governorate, Russian Empire	‘Chorniï brovy, kariï ochi’ [Black Eyebrows, Hazel Eyes, 1859]
Mykhailo Petrenko		1817-1862	Sloviansk, Sloboda Ukraine Governorate, Russian Empire	"Dyvlius ya na nebo" (I look up to the sky)
Panteleimon Kulish		1819-1897	Voronizh, Chernigov Governorate, Russian Empire	
Yakiv Shchoholiv		1823-1898	Okhtyrka, Sloboda Ukraine Governorate, Russian Empire	‘Priakha’ (The Spinner), ‘Cherevychky’ (Shoes), and ‘Zymovyi vechir’ (A Winter’s Evening)
Leonid Hlibov		1827-1893	Veselyi Podil, Khorol county, Poltava Governorate, Russian Empire	'Zhurba' (Sorrow)
Stepan Rudanskyi		1834-1873	Khomutyntsi, Vinnytsia county, Podolia Governorate, Russian Empire	‘Povii vitre, na Vkraïnu’ (Blow, Wind, on Ukraine)
Yurii Fedkovych		1834-1888	Putyla, Bukovina District, Austrian Empire	
Anatolii Svydnytskyi		1834-1871	Mankivtsi, Lityn county, Podolia Governorate, Russian Empire	
Oleksandr Konyskyi		1836-1900	Perekhodivka, Nezhinsky Uyezd, Chernigov Governorate, Russian Empire	Prayer for Ukraine
Sydir Vorobkevych		1836-1903	Chernivtsi, Bukovina District, Austrian Empire	
Pavlo Chubynskyi		1839-1884	Hora, Pereyaslav county, Poltava Governorate, Russian Empire	Shche ne vmerla Ukraina
Mykhailo Starytskyi		1840-1904	Klishchyntsi, Zolotonosha county, Poltava Governorate, Russian Empire	
Vasyl Mova		1842-1920	khutir near Starodereviankivska, Kuban Region, Russian Empire	
Ivan Manzhura		1851-1893	Kharkiv, Kharkov Governorate, Russian Empire	Stepovi dumy ta spivy (Steppe Dumas and Songs, 1889)
Ivan Franko		1856–1916	Nahuievychi, Kingdom of Galicia and Lodomeria, Austrian Empire	
Uliana Kravchenko		1860-1947	Mykolaiv, Zhydachiv county, Kingdom of Galicia and Lodomeria, Austrian Empire	
Borys Hrinchenko		1863-1910	Vilkhovyi Yar khutir, Kharkov Governorate, Russian Empire	
Hryts’ko Kernerenko		1863-1941	Huliaipole, Russian Empire	
Pavlo Hrabovskyi		1864-1902	Pushkarne, Okhtyrka county, Kharkov Governorate, Russian Empire	Prolisok (The Glade, 1894) and Z pivnochi (From the North, 1896)
Volodymyr Samiilenko		1864-1925	Sorochyntsi, Mirgorod county, Poltava Governorate, Russian Empire	Z poezii Volodymyra Samiilenka (From the Poetry of Volodymyr Samiilenko, published 1890), Ukraïni (To Ukraine, 1884-1906)
Osyp Makovei		1867-1925	Yavoriv, Kingdom of Galicia and Lodomeria, Austrian Empire	
Mykola Cherniavskyi		1868-1948	Torska Oleksiivka, Yekaterinoslav Governorate, Russian Empire	Pisni kokhannia (Songs of Love, 1895), Donets'ki sonety (Donets Sonnets, 1898), and Zori (Stars, 1903)
Lesia Ukrainka		1871-1913	Zviavel, Volynia Governorate, Russian Empire	
Mykola Voronyi		1871-1938	Rostov-on-Don, Don Cossack Region, Russian Empire	
Vasyl Shchurat		1871-1948	Vysloboky, Lviv county, Kingdom of Galicia and Lodomeria, Austro-Hungarian Empire	
Ahatanhel Krymskyi		1871-1942	Volodymyr-Volynskyi, Volynia Governorate, Russian Empire	three books of lyrical poetry on Oriental themes entitled Pal’move hillia: Ekzotychni poeziï (Palm Branches: Exotic Poems, 1901, 1908, 1922)
Bohdan Lepkyi		1872-1941	Krehulets, Husiatyn county, Kingdom of Galicia and Lodomeria, Austro-Hungarian Empire	
Mykhailo Yatskiv		1873-1961	Lesivka, Stanyslaviv county, Kingdom of Galicia and Lodomeria, Austro-Hungarian Empire	
Petro Karmanskyi		1878-1956	Chesaniv, Kingdom of Galicia and Lodomeria, Austro-Hungarian Empire	
Vasyl Pachovskyi		1878-1942	Zhulychi, Zolochiv county, Kingdom of Galicia and Lodomeria, Austro-Hungarian Empire	
Oleksandr Oles		1878-1944	Bilopillia, Sumy county, Kharkov Governorate, Russian Empire	Z zhurboiu radist' obnialas' (Joy and Sorrow Embraced, 1907)
Hrytsko Chuprynka		1879-1921	Hoholiv, Chernigov Governorate, Russian Empire	
Stepan Charnetskyi		1881-1944	Shmankivtsi, Chortkiv county, Kingdom of Galicia and Lodomeria, Austro-Hungarian Empire	V hodyni sumerku (In the Twilight Hour, 1908), V hodyni zadumy (In the Hour of Contemplation, 1917), Sumni idem (Unhappy We Go, 1920)
Khrystia Alchevska		1882-1931	Kharkiv, Kharkov Governorate, Russian Empire	
Mykyta Shapoval		1882-1932	Sriblianka, Bakhmut county, Yekaterinoslav Governorate, Russian Empire	Sny viry (Dreams of Faith, 1908) and Samotnist’ (Loneliness, 1910)
Ostap Lutskyi		1883-1941	Luka, Sambir county, Kingdom of Galicia and Lodomeria, Austro-Hungarian Empire	
Sydir Tverdokhlib		1886-1922	Berezhany, Kingdom of Galicia and Lodomeria, Austro-Hungarian Empire	V svichadi plesa (In the Mirror of the River's Surface, 1908)
Mykola Zerov		1890-1937	Zinkiv, Poltava Governorate, Russian Empire	
Pavlo Tychyna		1891-1967	Pisky, Kozelets county, Chernigov Governorate, Russian Empire	Soniashni kliarnety (Clarinets of the Sun, 1918; repr 1990)
Mykola Khvylovyi		1893-1933	Trostianets, Akhtyrsky Uyezd, Kharkov Governorate, Russian Empire	
Maksym Rylskyi		1895-1964	Kyiv, Kiev Governorate, Russian Empire	Synia dalechin’ (The Blue Distance, 1922), Poemy (Poems, 1924), Kriz’ buriu i snih (Through Storm and Snow, 1925), Trynadtsiata vesna (The Thirteenth Spring, 1926), Homin i vidhomin (The Resonance and the Echo, 1929), and De skhodiat’sia dorohy (Where the Roads Meet, 1929).
Volodymyr Sosiura		1898-1965	Debaltseve, Yekaterinoslav Governorate, Russian Empire	Love Ukraine, The Late Summer (Babyne Lito), To Maria, Stalin

== 20th century ==
Poet	Portrait	Date	Birthplace	Notable works
Natalia Livytska-Kholodna		1902-2005	Zolotonosha, Poltava Governorate, Russian Empire	
Ivan Bahrianyi		1906-1963	Kuzemyn, Kharkov Governorate, Russian Empire	
Olena Teliha		1906-1942	Ilyinskoye, Moscow Governorate, Russian Empire	
Bohdan Ihor Antonych		1909-1937	Nowica, Kingdom of Galicia and Lodomeria, Austro-Hungarian Empire	
Leonid Vysheslavsky		1914-2002	Mykolaiv, Kherson Governorate, Russian Empire	
Iryna Senyk		1926-2009	Lviv, Lwów Voivodeship, Second Polish Republic	
Lina Kostenko		1930-	Rzhyshchiv, Kyiv okruha, USSR	
Atena Pashko		1931-2012	Bystrytsia, Lwów Voivodeship, Second Polish Republic	
Emma Andijewska		1931-	Donetsk, Donetsk Oblast, Ukrainian SSR, USSR	
Vasyl Stus		1938-1985	Rakhnivka, Vinnytsia Oblast, Ukrainian SSR, USSR	
Bohdana Durda		1940-	Buchach, Chortkiv Raion, Western Ukraine	
Daria Chubata		1940-	Ternopil, Western Ukraine	
Hanna Chubach		1941-2019	Ploske village, Vinnytsya Oblast, Ukrainian SSR, USSR	
Roman Kudlyk		1941-2019	Jaroslaw, Western Ukraine	
Vasyl Holoborodko		1945-	Adrianopil, Ukrainian SSR, USSR	
Moisei Fishbeyn		1946-2020	Chernivtsi, Chernivtsi Oblast, Ukrainian SSR, USSR	
Yaroslav Pavuliak		1948-2010	Nastasiv, Ternopil Oblast, Ukrainian SSR, USSR	
Oleh Lysheha		1949-2014	Tysmenytsia, Stanislav Oblast, Ukrainian SSR, USSR	
Natalka Bilotserkviets		1954-	Kuianivka, Sumy Oblast, Ukrainian SSR, USSR	
Tetiana Yakovenko		1954-	Sobolivka, Teplyk Raion, Vinnytsia Oblast, Ukrainian SSR, USSR	
Ihor Rymaruk		1958-2008	Miakoty, Ukrainian SSR, Soviet Union	
Yurii Andrukhovych		1960-	Stanislav, Stanislav Oblast, Ukrainian SSR, USSR	
Ihor Pavliuk		1967-	Rozhysche Raion, Volyn Oblast, Ukrainian SSR, USSR	
Halyna Petrosaniak		1969-	Zakarpattia Oblast, Ukrainian SSR, USSR	
Taras Chubai		1970-	Lviv, Lviv Oblast, Ukrainian SSR, USSR	
Eugenia Chuprina		1971-	Kyiv, Kyiv Oblast, Ukrainian SSR, USSR	
Marianna Kiyanovska		1973-	Zhovkva, Lviv Oblast, Ukrainian SSR, USSR	
Mariana Savka		1973-	Kopchyntsi, Ternopil Oblast, Ukrainian SSR, USSR	
Tetiana Cherep-Perohanych		1974-	Stara Basan, Bobrovytsia Raion, Chernihiv Oblast, Ukrainian SSR, USSR	
Serhii Zhadan		1974-	Starobilsk, Luhansk Oblast, Ukrainian SSR, USSR	
Yurii Ruf		1980-2022	Berezhany, Ternopil Oblast, Ukrainian SSR, USSR	
Oksana Maksymchuk		1982-	Lviv, Lviv Oblast, Ukrainian SSR, USSR	
Kateryna Mikhalitsyna		1982-	Mlyniv, Rivne Oblast, Ukrainian SSR, USSR	
Iya Kiva		1984-	Donetsk, Donetsk Oblast, Ukrainian SSR, USSR	
Lyubov Yakymchuk		1985-	Pervomaisk, Luhansk Oblast, Ukrainian SSR, USSR	
Iryna Shuvalova		1986-	Kyiv, Kyiv Oblast, Ukrainian SSR, USSR	
Maksym Kryvtsov		1990-2024	Rivne, Rivne Oblast, Ukrainian SSR, USSR	
Myroslav Laiuk		1990-	Smodna, Kosiv Raion, Ivano-Frankivsk Oblast, Ukrainian SSR, USSR	
Yaryna Chornohuz		1995-	Kyiv, Kyiv Oblast, Ukraine	
