= Laiuk =

Laiuk is a surname. Notable people with the surname include:

- Myroslav Laiuk (born 1990), Ukrainian writer
- Olga Laiuk (born 1984), Ukrainian handballer player
