= Irena Karpa =

Ukrainian writer, journalist, and singer (born 1980)

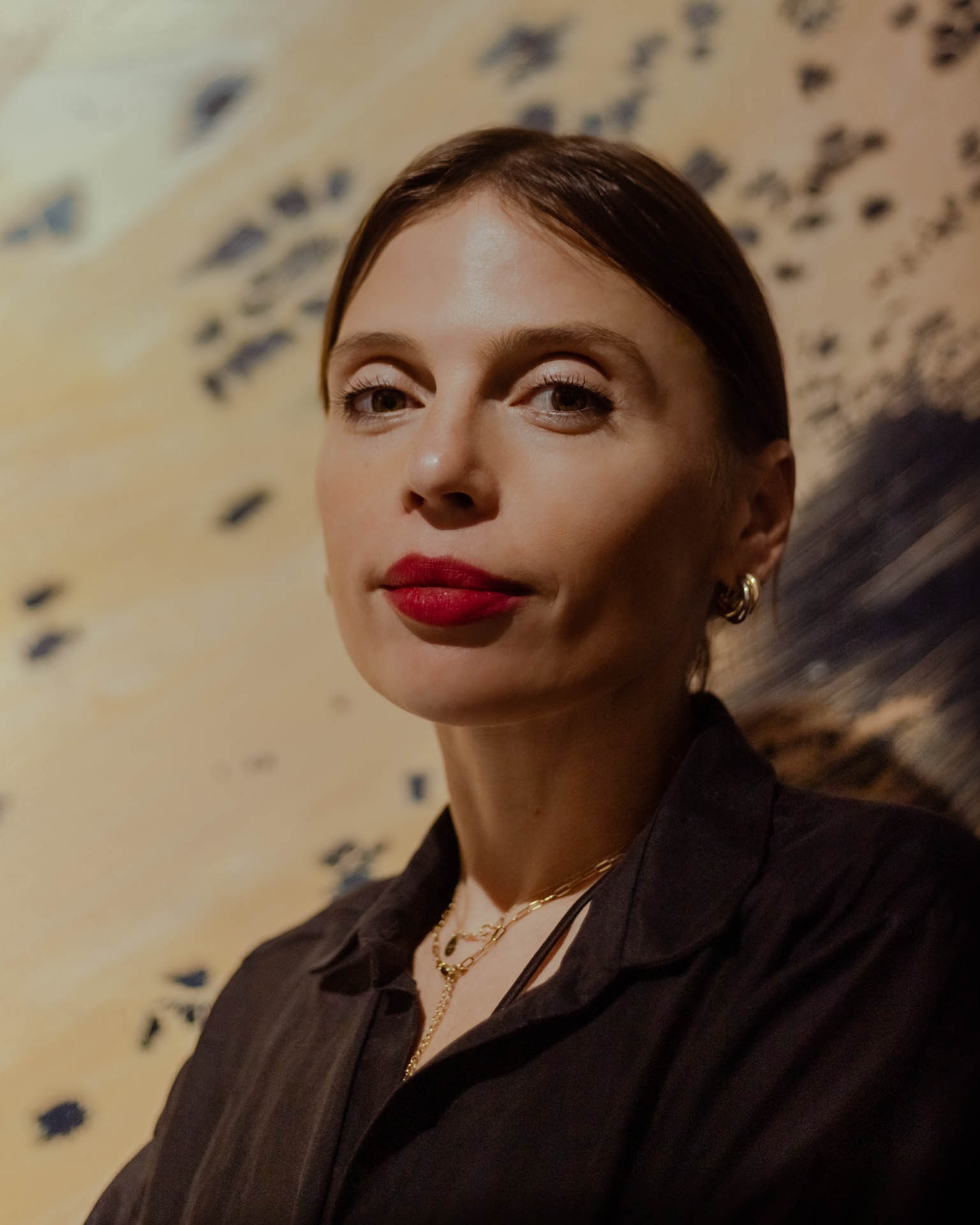
- Karpa in Gdansk, 2022
- Born: December 8, 1980 (age 45); Cherkasy, Ukraine
- Education: Kyiv National Linguistic University
- Writing career
- Language: Ukrainian
- Period: since 1999
- Notable awards: "Hranoslov" (1999) "Best Ukrainian Awards"(2006)

Irena Karpa (Ukrainian: Ірена Карпа) was born in 1980; she is a Ukrainian writer, journalist, and singer.

== Biography ==
Irena Karpa was born on 8 December 1980 in Cherkasy (Central Ukraine), and grew up in the Subcarpathian region (Prykarpattia).

Since 1999, she has been the frontwoman and songwriter of the band Faktychno Sami (later renamed Qarpa). Her first book was published in 2000 when she was a student at Kyiv National Linguistic University. In 2003, Karpa received a graduate's degree (magistar) in the English and French languages. After graduating, she traveled in Southeast Asia for a year. This sparked the appearance of her book Freud Would Cry.

From 2005 to 2008, she worked on TV (ICTV, Inter , and MTV Ukraine). In 2004, she was a film director in Kyiv. Limited Edition, and in 2006 starred in Oleh Anpilohov's film Autism and A. Yakushenkov's film Compote.

Some of her works have been translated into Polish, Czech, Bulgarian, and Russian.

On 13 October 2014, according to Euromaidan, the minister of culture of the self-proclaimed "Republic of Donetsk" signed a death warrant ordering that she be shot for publishing a cartoon considered inappropriate.

== Personal life ==
On May 17, 2008, Karpa married journalist and writer Anton Friedland, but in 2009, they divorced. In September, she married an American financier, Norman Paul Hansen. They have two daughters.

== Selected works ==
- "Знес Паленого" (2000)
- "50 хвилин трави" (2004)
- "Фройд би плакав" (2004)
- "Перламутрове Порно (Супермаркет самотності)" (2005)
- "Bitches Get Everything" (2007)
- "Супермаркет самотності. Перламутрове порно" (2008)
- "Добло і зло" (2008)
- "Цукерки, фрукти і ковбаси" (2010)
- "Піца "Гімалаї"" (2011)
- "З роси, води і калабані" (2012)

== See also ==
- Contemporary Ukrainian literature
