= Ukrainian literature =

The term Ukrainian literature (Ukrainian: Українська література) is normally used to describe works of literature written in the Ukrainian language. In a broader sense, it can also relate to all literary works created in the territory of Ukraine.

Ukrainian literature developed mostly under foreign domination over Ukrainian territories, mainly by the Polish–Lithuanian Commonwealth, Poland, the Russian Empire, the Kingdom of Romania, the Austro-Hungarian Empire, and the Ottoman Empire.

Ukrainian literature can be traced back to Kievan Rus' when Rus' chronicles and epic poetry were written in Old Church Slavonic and Church Slavonic. Oral folktale also appeared at the time. Old Church Slavonic was used mostly in written documents, but the common spoken language in the territories which it dominated was Old East Slavic, which eventually divided into Ukrainian, Russian, and Belarusian. Ukrainian culture was thriving under the rule of Ukrainian Cossacks, although their state was eventually divided into eastern and western parts dominated by various neighbours. From the 19th century, Ukrainian literary works started to be written in a colloquial form. Poems, novels, plays, and other works were published. Following the trend, Ukrainian nationalist and independence movements started to grow. The Russian Empire and the following Soviet Union, however, often suppressed and restricted the use of the Ukrainian language, methods of expression, and literary subjects.

== Definition ==
According to the standard definition inherited from the period of Romanticism, Ukrainian literature has been frequently confined exclusively to literary works written in the vernacular Ukrainian language, which established itself in writing during the 19th century. This point of view has been argued against by authors such as Dmytro Chyzhevsky and George Grabowicz, who state that a single literary tradition may use different languages at different stages of its development. According to this point of view, literary works written in literary languages dominant in Ukrainian lands during the eras preceding the rise of Ukrainian as a language of literature, for example the Old East Slavic Tale of Igor's Campaign, Polish-language poetry of Ivan Velychkovskyi or Russian-language prose by Hrebinka, Kvitka and Shevchenko, make up an essential part of Ukrainian literature.

In the language sense, modern Ukrainian literature can be broadly divided into Ukrainian-speaking writers and Russian-speaking writers who live in Ukraine and write on Ukrainian themes. However, works written in Surzhyk, or Ukrainian by foreign authors, can also be seen as Ukrainian literature. Works written in Crimean Tatar language or foreign languages by Ukrainian people also count. (Note: For the Crimean Tatar language, there is Emil Amit; for Ukrainian people living abroad,, there's Marjana Gaponenko who born in Odesa but moved to Germany.)

Ukrainian literature of the past has been rediscovered and repositioned through historical traces. Russian literature has also a similar process. In history, the relationship between Ukraine and Russia has been fluid. This is because they were not separated in the past, and there are multiple criteria for classification, making it difficult to determine. (Note: Scholars have some criteria to determine the work's belonging, including the author's ethnicity, language, self-identification, and the setting of the work. Historically, some Ukrainian writers who wrote in Russian have a Russian (or the Soviet Union later) identity. For example, Kulish and Kostomarov of the Ukrainian nationalist movement Brotherhood of Saints Cyril and Methodius chose the path of improving Ukraine's status within Russia rather than Ukrainian independence.) Since Ukrainian independence, there's a trend toward Ukrainianization and Derussification of publishing, and the proportion of Ukrainian works continues to increase.

== History of Ukrainian literary studies ==
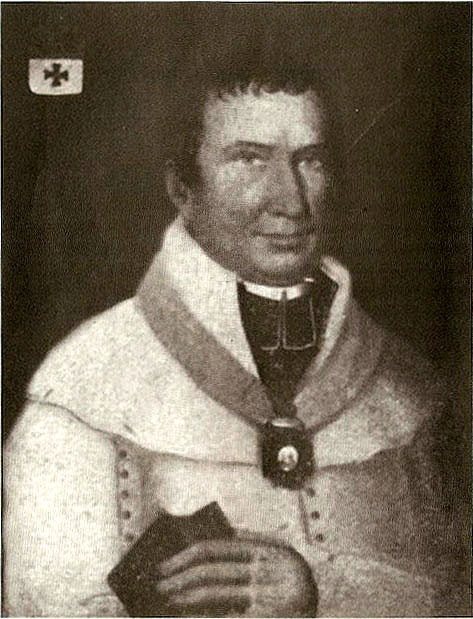
Ivan Mohylnytsky, creator of the first historical summary of Ukrainian literary works

The first systematic collection of Ukrainian literary works was published in 1829 by Galician Greek Catholic priest Ivan Mohylnytsky in the appendix to his fundamental work on Ruthenian language. Mohylnytsky's list covered works created during the timespan starting from the Medieval era to the Early modern period and included legal documents, such as the Statutes of Lithuania, translations from the Bible, as well as texts by Ivan Kotliarevsky and other authors from Dnieper Ukraine. The narrative of Ukrainian literature's historical continuity was developed by Ivan Vahylevych in his Notes on Ruthenian Literature (1848), and in January 1849 a series of lectures on the topic was presented by Yakiv Holovatsky at Lviv University. Unlike Austrian-ruled Ukraine, the reviews of Ukrainian literature under Russian rule during that time were generally limited to contemporary works. An exception from this trend was the history of "Little Russian" literature by Ivan Pryzhov, which was translated into Ukrainian in 1869 by Anatole Vakhnianyn.

The first academical works on the history of Ukrainian literature were created by Kiev Theological Academy professor and future member of the Ukrainian Academy of Sciences Nikolai Petrov, who in 1880 presented his overview of 18th century Ukrainian Baroque drama, and in 1884 published a study on Ukrainian literary works of the 19th century. Petrov's work led to the start of a discussion, which was nevertheless limited by Russian censorship. Russian imperial ideology claimed that the only future of literature in Ukrainian lands lay in union with Russia. In opposition to those claims, in 1892 Ivan Franko presented his own work dedicated to Ukrainian literature of the 16th-18th centuries. According to Franko, the chronology of Ukrainian literary process should be started not from 1798, but from the Medieval era. The publication of the History of Ruthenian Literature (1887-1893) by Lviv professor Omelian Ohonovsky further radicalized the discussion, with Russian scientists such as Alexander Pypin denying the claims of Ukrainian literature's line of descent from the literary works of Rus period. In 1909-1912 Bohdan Lepky, who then worked as professor of Ukrainian language and literature at the Jagiellonian University in Kraków, published two volumes deicated to the history of Ukrainian literature from the Medieval era and up to the times of Ivan Kotliarevsky; a third volume was destroyed in 1914 during the Russian invasion of Galicia.

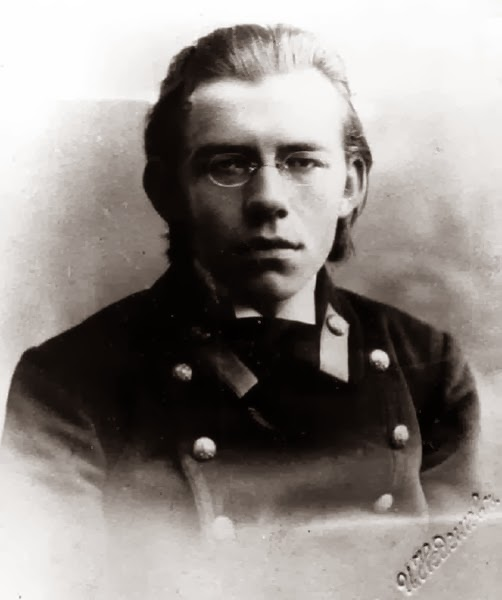
Dmytro Chyzhevsky, author of the fundamental History of Ukrainian Literature (1956)

First published in 1911, Serhiy Yefremov's History of Ukrainian Writing became an influential work on Ukrainian literary history, undergoing numerous editions. In 1923 Mykhailo Hrushevsky published the first part of his History of Ukrainian Literature, whose last volume would see the light only 1995. Other publications on the topic emerged in the Poland and among Ukrainian emigrants in Czechoslovakia. An early analysis of Ukrainian modernist literature was presented in 1910 by Mykola Yevshan. In 1929 Mykola Zerov published a study of works by 19th-century Ukrainian authors, making an emphasis on the figures of Gregory Skovoroda and Panteleimon Kulish. Starting from 1942 a number of studies on the history of Ukrainian literature was developed by Dmytro Chyzhevsky, resulting in his History of Ukrainian Literature: from the Beginnings to the Age of Realism (1956) published in the United States. Chyzhevsky's works were met with hostility in the Soviet Union, where the official narrative denied the continuity of literary process in Ukraine and proclaimed the emergence of a "new Ukrainian literature" following the October Revolution. Soviet-published History of Ukrainian Literature in 8 volumes saw the light in 1967-1971.

Postmodernist era led to the reevaluation of the very notion of literary history, applied to the Ukrainian context by George Grabowicz in his article On the History of Ukrainian Literature (1997). Other works on the topic from that period include the study of Ukrainian modernism by Solomiia Pavlychko, as well as publications by other authors concerning topics such as regional literature and literary works created by women. Between 2013 and 2025 a new academical work on the history of Ukrainian literature was published in 12 volumes.

== History ==
=== Ukrainian literature’s precursor: writings in Old-Church Slavonic and Latin in Ukraine ===
Prior to the establishment of Ukrainian literature in the 18th century, many authors from Ukraine wrote in "scholarly" languages of the Middle Ages – Latin and Old-Church Slavonic. Among prominent authors from Ukraine who wrote in Latin and Old-Church Slavonic are Hryhorii Skovoroda, Yuriy Drohobych, Stanislav Orikhovsky-Roxolan, Feofan Prokopovych, Jan-Toma Yuzefovych, Pavlo Rusyn-Krosnyanyn and others.

=== Beginnings of oral Ukrainian literature ===
During this period of history there was a higher number of elementary schools per population in the Hetmanate than in either neighboring Muscovy or Poland. In the 1740s, of 1,099 settlements within seven regimental districts, as many as 866 had primary schools. The German visitor to the Hetmanate, writing in 1720, commented on how the son of Hetman Danylo Apostol, who had never left Ukraine, was fluent in the Latin, Italian, French, German, Polish and Russian languages

Late 16th and early 17th century included the rise of folk epics called dumy. These songs celebrated the activities of the Cossacks and were oral retellings of major Ukrainian historical events in modern Ukrainian language (i.e., not in Old-Church Slavonic). This tradition produced Ostap Veresai, a renowned minstrel and kobzar from Poltava province, Ukraine.

=== Beginnings of written Ukrainian literature ===
Ivan Kotlyarevsky (1769–1838)	Taras Shevchenko (1814–1861)	Ivan Franko (1856–1916)	Mykhailo Kotsiubynsky (1864–1913)	Lesya Ukrainka (1871–1913)

The establishment of Ukrainian literature is believed to have been triggered by the publishing of a widely successful poem Eneida by Ivan Kotliarevsky in 1798, which is one of the first instances of a printed literary work written in modern Ukrainian language. Due to Kotliarevsky's role as the inaugurator of Ukrainian literature, among literary critics he is often referred to as "the father of Ukrainian literature". Modern Ukrainian prose was inaugurated by Hryhorii Kvitka-Osnovianenko’s novel Marusya (1834).

=== Contemporary literature ===
Contemporary Ukrainian literature refers to the period after the Perestroika and the foundation of Bu-Ba-Bu. Since the late 1980s, and particularly after the independence of Ukraine (1991) and disappearance of Soviet censorship the whole generation of writers emerged: Sofia Maidanska, Ihor Kalynets, Moysey Fishbein, Yuri Andrukhovych, Serhiy Zhadan, Oksana Zabuzhko, Oleksandr Irvanets, Yuriy Izdryk, Maria Matios, Ihor Pavlyuk and many others. Many of them are considered to be "postmodernists".

== Events, Prizes, Organisations ==
Following the 2000s, literature events like book fairs and book forums are increasing. Noticeable events are Arsenal Book Festival held in Kyiv in May, Book Forum Lviv held in Lviv in September. In addition to book introductions, these events will feature film screenings, concerts, and plays. (Note: In 2017, 50,000 people visited the Arsenal Book Festival, and 15,000 visited the Book Forum Lviv. 。) Ukrainian publishers also attend various international book fairs, such as Frankfurt Book Fair.

Literary prize includes Shevchenko National Prize, Koronatsiya Slova, and Book of the Year BBC Ukraine. Shevchenko National Prize is the highest state prize of Ukraine for works of culture and the arts, awarded for achievements in various fields of Ukraine. There are up to six prizes in the Shevchenko National Prize, including Literature, Journalism, Music, Theatre, Film, and Performing Arts. Koronatsiya Slova established in 1999. There are up to five prizes in it, including Novels, Lyrics, Film scripts, Plays, and Children's literature. "Book of the Year BBC Ukraine" is established by BBC, awarding adult and children's Ukrainian literature.

There was an artists' organisation called "Union of Ukrainian Writers" since the Soviet era. However, the younger generation held a negative reputation for it. (Note: When the Soviet Union responded to the Prague Spring with a military intervention, the only opponent of the intervention from the group is Lina Kostenko.) In 1997, therefore, the Union of Ukrainian Writers was founded, and in 1998, PEN Ukraine was founded.

== See also ==
- Belarusian literature
- Contemporary Ukrainian literature
- Eneida
- The Forest Song
- Shevchenko National Prize – the national literary and artistic award
- Ukrainian Book Institute
- Ukrainian speculative fiction
- Ukrainian studies
- List of libraries in Ukraine
- List of Ukrainian writers
- List of Ukrainian-language writers

== Bibliography ==
- A History of Ukrainian Literature (From the 11th to the End of the 19th Century): With an Overview of the Twentieth Century (Annals of the Ukrainian Academy ... and Sciences in the U.S., Inc, Vol 17–19) by Dmitrij Tschizewskij, George S. N. Luckyj, Dolly Ferguson, and Doreen Gorsline
- Ukrainian Literature Through the Ages by Yevhen Shabliovsky, Abraham Mistetsky, and Andrew Marko (Paperback – 1 January 2001)
- Toward a history of Ukrainian literature. Grabowicz, George G. / distrib. by Harvard University Press for the Harvard Ukrainian Research Institute / 1981 (104: SLA U 50 : 50s Bungehuis-Spuistraat 210, 2e etage)
- A history of Ukrainian literature, from the 11th to the end of the 19th century. Cyzevs'kyj, Dmytro / Ukrainian Academic Press / 1975 (UBM: H 77–63, Singel 425, UB magazijn)
- Ukrainian literature. Kasinec, Edward / Harvard University / 1977 (UBM: Br. f\0 L m 9)
- Ukrainian literature in the twentieth century: a reader's guide. Luckyj, George S.N. / Univ. of Toronto press / 1992 (UBM: H 96-1818)
- Ukrainian Literature in English, 1980–1989 by Marta Tarnawsky
