= Petro Midyanka =

Ukrainian poet and teacher (born 1959)

- Петро Мідянка
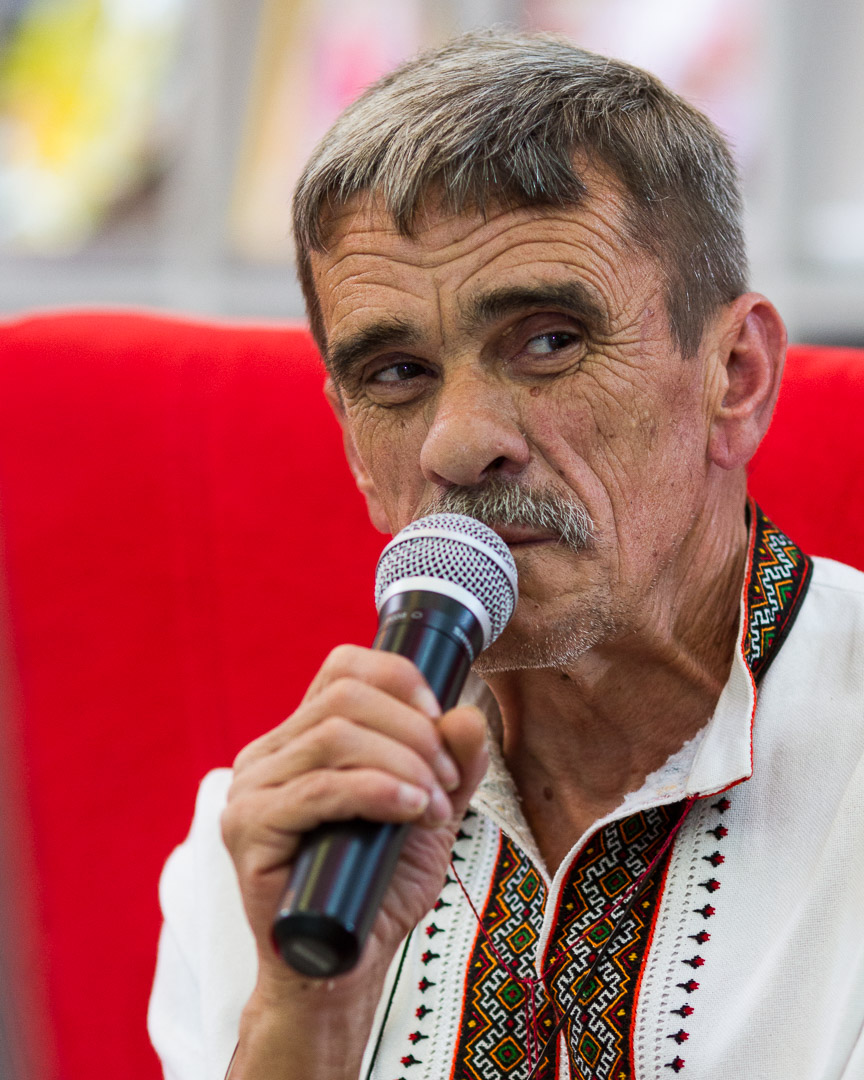
- Midyanka in 2015
- Born: Petro Mykolayovych Midyanka; 14 May 1959 (age 67); Shyrokyy Luh, Zakarpattia oblast, USSR (now Ukraine)
- Other name: Ropet Kamidyan
- Education: Uzhhorod National University
- Occupations: Poet; teacher
- Spouse: Lyudmyla Zagoruyko
- Awards: see §

Petro Mykolayovych Midyanka (Note: Ukrainian: Петро Миколайович Мідянка) (born 14 May 1959), also known by his pen name Ropet Kamidyan, is a Ukrainian poet and teacher who became the a member of the National Writers' Union of Ukraine since 1994. He has spent almost his whole life, or more than 30 years, as a member of current Ukrainian literature, and he has never been overlooked for the highest literary accolades or the interest of readers and critics.

== Early life and education ==
Born on 14 May 1959, in the Ukrainian village of Shyrokyy Luh. Midyanka received his secondary education in Khust, and later obtained his degree from Uzhhorod National University's Faculty of Philology. Following his graduation from university in 1982, he goes back to his hometown and starts teaching in the nearby town of Novoselytsia, then Tysolovo in Tiachiv Raion.

== Poetry work ==
Midyanka is based in Transcarpathia and works there. His debut novel, Поріг (1987), was published by a publishing firm in Kyiv. He produced additional collections Фараметлики (1994), Осередок (1994), and Зелений фирес (1999), all in Uzhhorod. He continued to create even in the turbulent 1990s, when censorship vanished and with it governmental backing for the book and publishing business after the fall of the Soviet Union.

Midyanka instructs students in the language and literature of Ukraine. Along with his accomplishments in education, he was the 1998 Teacher of the Year competition winner. Užhorodské kavárny. Ужгородські кав'ярні, another intriguing novel written by Midyanka, is published in Prague in 2004 by a Ukrainian initiative in the Czech Republic. He released the book Мідянкув язік і стіл in 2007, with the sponsor of the Slovak Ministry of Culture. In Ukraine, the most excellent book of the year was declared to be Ярмінок (2008), the most recent collection.

A discussion with Midyanka took held in the Khust Central City Library reading room on 26 May 2023. His wife moderated the meeting.

Midyanka has been known to have written in Hungarian, Czech, Romanian. His poetry have been translated into English, Czech, Serbo-Croatian, Russian, and Hungarian. He published his poems in Slovakia and the Czech Republic in two different collections.

== Books ==
Midyanka has published the following poetry books:

- Поріг (1987)
- Осередок (1994)
- Фараметлики (1994)
- Зелений фирес (1999)
- Трава Господня (2001)
- Дижма (2003)
- Užhorodské kavárny. Ужгородські кав'ярні (2004)
- Срібний прімаш (2004)
- Ярмінок (2008)
- Луйтра в небо (2010)
- Вірші з поду (2011)
- Марамороський розлом (2011)
- Ільмовий листочок (2012)
- 40 сонетів і гербарій (2013)
- Карпати на трьох (2016), with Nazar Fedorak and V. Zelenchuk

== Personal life ==
Midyanka claimed in a 2008 interview that his father, a 95-year-old logger, respected education much but not literature. His mother, on the other hand, was descended from musicians. It should be mentioned that his father was born in Austria-Hungary at the close of the 19th century.

Lyudmyla Zagoruyko, an author of four books, is the spouse of Midyanka. She left Uzhhorod for Shyrykyy Lug, where she met him at the age of 55.

== Awards and recognitions ==
Midyanka has received awards and recognitions such as:

- Bu-Ba-Bu Award for Best Poem of the Year (1995)
- Blagovist Award (1995)
- Fedor Potushnyak Regional Award (1999)
- Shevchenko National Prize (2012)
- Member of the National Writers' Union of Ukraine (1994)
- Honorary citizen of the city of Khust
