= Igor Rosokhovatski =

Ukrainian writer (1929–2015)

Ihor Markovych Rosokhovatśkyi (Ukrainian: Ігор Маркович Росоховатський; 30 August 1929 — 8 June 2015) was a Ukrainian writer.

== Works (selected) ==
- 1990 — And Man Created Syhom
