= Volodymyr Vladko =

Ukrainian journalist, writer and theatre critic (1901–1974)

- Native name: Володимир Миколайович Владко
- Born: Volodymyr Yeremchenko; January 8, 1901 Saint Petersburg, Russian Empire
- Died: April 21, 1974 (aged 73) Kiev, Ukrainian SSR, USSR
- Resting place: Baikove Cemetery
- Occupation: fantasy writer, journalist, literary critic, theatre critic
- Language: Russian, Ukrainian
- Education: Voronezh Institute of Popular Education
- Period: 1926-1971
- Genre: science fiction
- Notable works: Argonauts of the Universe, Descendants of the Scythians
- Notable awards: Order of the Badge of Honour (1967)
- Spouse: Marina

Signature
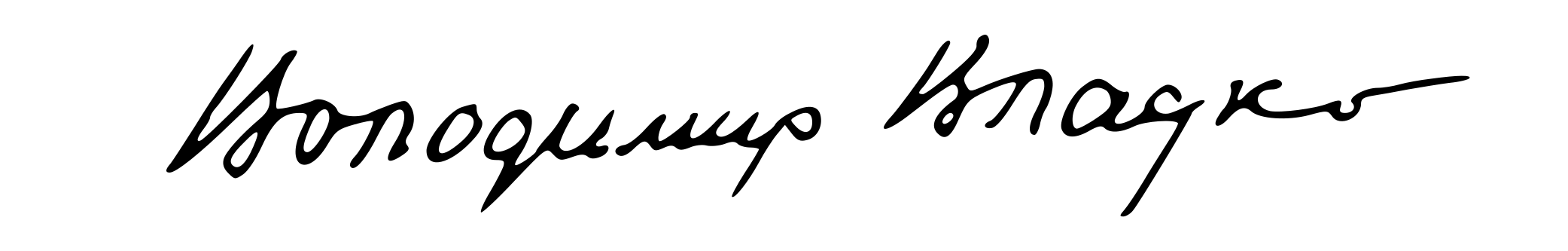

Volodymyr Yeremchenko (Ukrainian: Володи́мир Микола́йович Єре́мченко, 8 January 1901 – 21 April 1974), better known under his pen name Volodymyr Vladko, was a Soviet Ukrainian fiction writer, journalist and theatre critic. He was a member of the Union of Soviet Writers (1934).

== Early life and education ==
Volodymyr was born in Saint Petersburg, in the family of a newspaper technician and a midwife. He received his primary education in a real school, and later he graduated from the Voronezh Institute of Popular Education. He was fluent in English and Latin. After losing his father at the age of 15, he started working as a copyist in various print publications.

His first publications dates to 1917, when he began working as a reporter. From 1917 to 1919 he worked as a feature writer for the Voronezh Commune newspaper, and from 1919 to 1921, as head of the propaganda department of Tsentropechat in Voronezh.

Working at a newspaper in Leningrad and then in Voronezh, he signed his first publications as Vladimir Eremchenko. But a typographical error was made in the pages of one article: "Vlad" remained from the first word, and the ending "ko" from the second, leading him to adopt pseudonym "Vladko".

He moved to Kharkov in 1921, where he worked as a literary employee of the editorial office of Kharkov Proletarian newspaper, a Ukrainian-language correspondent for the newspaper For Industrialisation and executive secretary of the Radio magazine.

Vladko died on April 20, 1974, in Kiev at the age of 73. He was buried at the Baikove Cemetery.

== Literary career ==
His first book Donbas – the land of gold, was released in 1930. He made his debut as a science fiction writer, with the story The Robots Go, which was awarded a prize at the all-Ukrainian competition in 1929. During that time period he released other books, including such titles as: The Wonderful Generator, Argonauts of the Universe, 12 stories, and Descendants of the Scythians.

In the late 1930s, he became a senior lecturer at the Department of theory and practice of the party press at the Ukrainian Institute of Journalism in Kharkiv. Later he worked as a literary employee of the editorial office of Socialist Kharkivshchyna newspaper.

In October 1935 the Kyiv magazine completed the publication of Volodymyr Vladko's fantastic novel "The Argonauts of the Universe". It had an enormous success, so "Dytvydav" publishing house immediately signed an agreement with the 34-year-old author.

In a well-twisted plot of "The Argonauts of the Universe" it was the first time when the main heroes went to Venus, not the Mars or the Moon. The story contains a lot of astronomical curiosities, as well as an exotic route of an interplanetary expedition and the first Ukrainian "literary" astronaut.

The 1956 edition underwent a significant revision by Soviet Union censorship committee. In the light of the latest scientific achievements, it was significantly supplemented, and new characters were introduced. The old characters were substituted by the new ones: Borys Guro was replaced with a Chinese professor Wang Lun (at that time, friendship with China was a trend in Soviet politics), and Vasyl Ryzhko was replaced with the female student Halyna Ryzhko.

The science fiction writer predicted many things in his previous novel "Aerotorpedoes turn back", published by Dytvydav in 1934.

In it, a kind of European country (in the pictures, its soldiers are shown with a swastika on their clothes) attacks the USSR, and the bombers drop the first bombs at 4 a.m. (this is exactly what happened seven years later in June 1941). Almost all copies of the print run were withdrawn from sale and destroyed due to censorship (Ukrainian language). At the time Vladko flourished in his literary activity the Soviet regime killed most of Ukrainian intellectual élite, so called Executed Renaissance. It is still unknown how he escaped from being imprisoned or killed.

After releasing The Grey-haired Captain, Vladko fell silent for 15 years. During the Second World War, Vladko was a political commentator on the Taras Shevchenko radio station in Saratov. Subsequently, he became a special correspondent of the Radinformburo, an in-house correspondent of the Pravda newspaper, head of the Central Repertoire Committee of Ukrainian SSR, and head of Literaturna Gazeta (Literature Newspaper). In 1944, he became a member of the Communist Party of Soviet Union.

In 1956, Vladko returned to writing science fiction, writing the stories Borrowed Time, Purple Death, the collection Magical Stories, as well as reissuing The Gray-haired Captain.

Vladko's works have been translated into Belarusian, Bulgarian, English, Hungarian, Lithuanian, German, Serbian, Czech and Japanese. In particular, Argonauts of the Universe was published six times in Japan.

== Selected works ==
- "The Iron Riot" ("The Robots Go") (1931, 1967)
- "The Wonderful Generator" (1935)
- "12 stories" (1936)
- "Aerotorpedoes turn back" (1937)
- "Argonauts of the Universe" (1935, 1956)
- "Descendants of the Schythians" (1939)
- "Grey-haired Captain" (1941, 1959)
- "Borrowed Time" ("Savings Bank of Time") (1961)
- "Magical Stories" (1962)
- "Purple Death" (1963)
- Works in five volumes (1970–1971)

== Sources ==
- Ukrainian Soviet Encyclopedia: in 12 volumes / ch. ed. M. P. Bazhan; editor: O. K. Antonov and others. — 2nd edition. — K.: Main editorial office of USE, 1974–1985.
- Volodymyr Vladko. The last «Ukrainian Jules Vern»? Archived 11 February 2017 in Wayback Machine.] 06.03.2013 Dzerkalo Tyzhnia
- "The writer Volodymyr Vladko has died" // "Svoboda", part 89, May 10, 1974, p. 1 [Archived 9 July 2016 in Wayback Machine.]
- Biography on UaModna, 24 April 2015
- Fiction in the times of industrialization: 6 strangest novels Archived 10 January 2019 у Wayback Machine.]
- https://www.istpravda.com.ua/blogs/2015/11/26/148740/
- https://chtyvo.org.ua/authors/Vladko/Descendants_of_the_Scythians_anhl/
