= Lyubko Deresh =

Ukrainian writer

- Любко Дереш
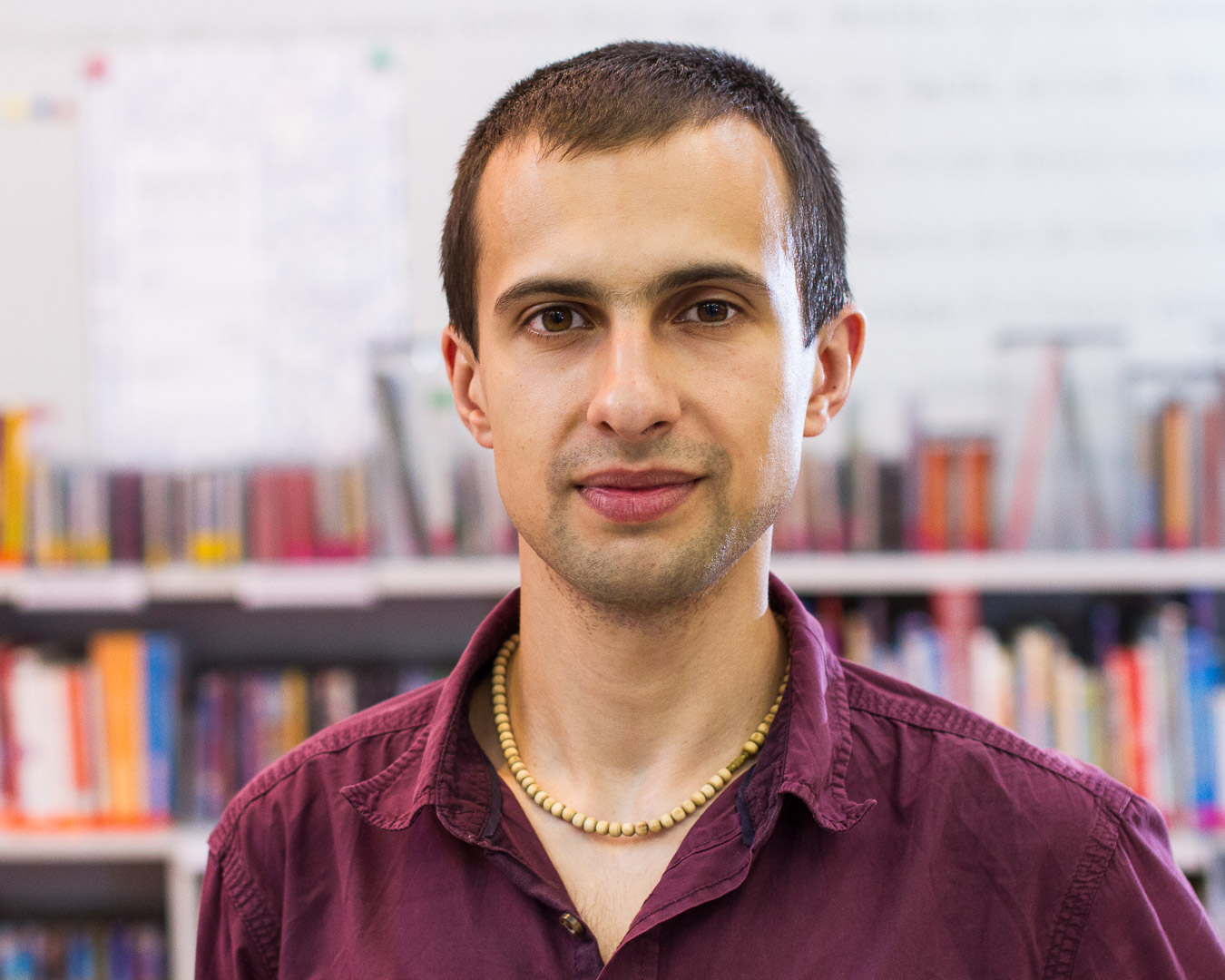
- Deresh in 2015
- Born: 3 July 1984 (age 42); Pustomyty, Lviv Oblast, Ukrainian SSR, Soviet Union
- Writing career
- Language: Ukrainian
- Years active: 2001–present
- Period: 21st century
- Notable works: Kult (2001); Where the Wind Blows (2021)

Lyubko Deresh (Ukrainian: Любко Дереш, born 3 July 1984) is a Ukrainian author. His debut novel, Cult, was published in 2001, when Deresh was just seventeen. Since then, he has remained one of Ukraine's most popular authors.

Deresh has been nicknamed the "Stephen King of Ukraine" due to the themes of his earlier works, which typically feature teenage protagonists experiencing supernatural events.

In 2023, Deresh launched a charity sale of his unpublished works to fundraise for the Armed Forces of Ukraine. Deresh's works have been translated into German, French, Italian, Polish, Serbian, Bulgarian, and Romanian. As of 2025, none of his works have yet been published in English.

== Personal life ==
Deresh was born in Pustomyty in Lviv Oblast. He studied economics at the University of Lviv. He is married to the singer Polina Yerko.

== Books ==
- 2001 — Культ (Cult)
- 2002 — Поклоніння ящірці
- 2005 — Архе
- 2006 — Намір! (Intent!)
- 2007 — Трохи пітьми (A Bit of Darkness)
- 2011 — Голова Якова (Head of Jacob)
- 2013 — Остання любов Асури Махараджа (Last Love of Asura Maharaja)
- 2013 — Миротворець (Peacemaker)
- 2014 — Пісні про любов і вічність (Songs of Love and Eternity)
- 2017 — Спустошення (Devastation)
- 2021 —Там, де вітер (Where the Wind Blows)
- 2024 — Погляд Медузи. Маленька книга пітьми (The Look of Medusa, or, The Little Book of Darkness)
