= Hryts'ko Kernerenko =

Jewish-Ukrainian poet

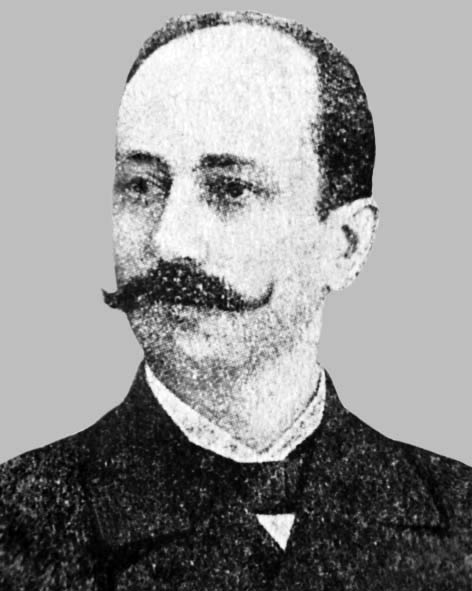
Hryts’ko Kernerenko

Hryts’ko Kernerenko (Ukrainian: Грицько Кернеренко, born Grigorii Borisovich Kerner; 1863–1941) was a Jewish-Ukrainian poet. He may have been the first poet of Jewish descent to write in Ukrainian, and was the first to write on the topic of Jewish-Ukrainian identity.

== Biography ==
Kernerenko was born into a wealthy Russian-speaking family in Huliaipole. Due to the quota then in place in the Russian Empire limiting restricting the number of Jews able to attend university, Kernerenko was instead sent to study agronomy at a polytechnic college in Munich. He apparently traveled through Europe and visited Austria and Italy in 1883, and upon finishing his studies returned to Huliaipole to become a manager of his own estate.

He began publishing poems in Literaturno-Naukovyi Vistnyk ("Literary Scientific Herald," the most important Ukrainian periodical of the time) and other magazines in the 1880s. His poems were widely anthologized.

Kernerenko published four books of poetry, as well as short stories and plays. He also translated works by Sholem Aleichem, Shimen Frug, Semyon Nadson, Heinrich Heine, and Alexander Pushkin into Ukrainian.

Many of Kernerenko's poems center on feelings of love and loneliness but he also wrote on Ukrainian national themes. After 1900 he began writing poems with Jewish subject matter and expressing support for Zionism.

He married Rebecca Gordskoff and had three sons: Yakov, Victor, and Emile. Records are scarce, but the family appears to have left Ukraine for Turkey after the Russian Revolution, subsequently moving on to France. Kernerenko died in Paris in 1941.

== Sources ==
- Shandrij, Myroslav. "The Jewish Voice in Ukrainian Literature" The Ukrainian Quarterly, Vol. LXII, No. 1, Spring 2006.
