= Vasyl Holoborodko =

Ukrainian poet

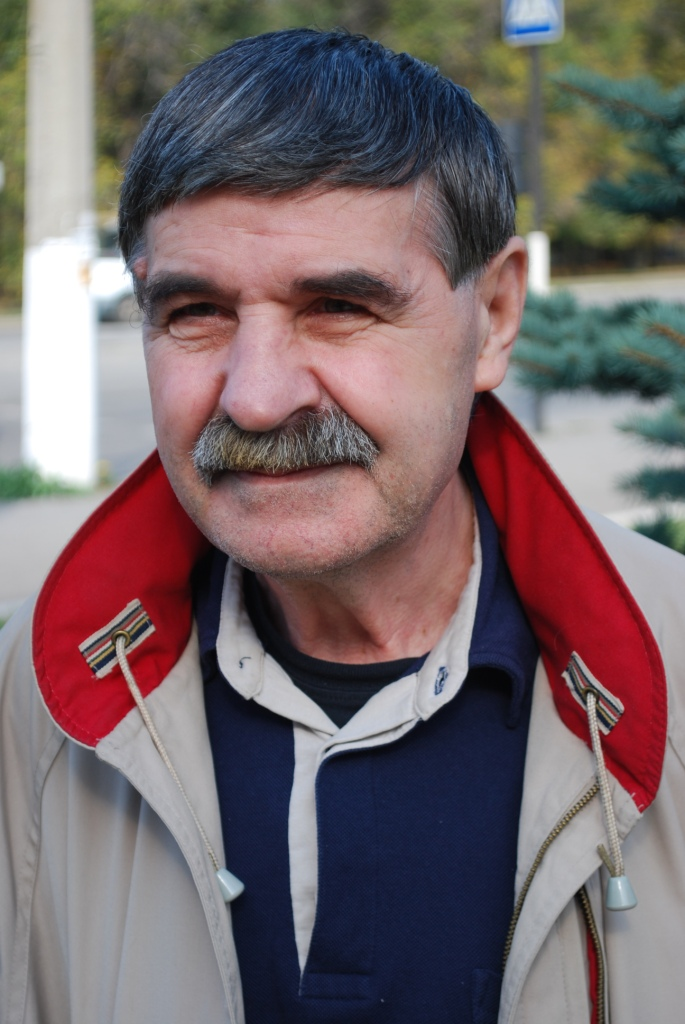
- Born: 7 April 1945 (age 81); Adrianopil, Ukrainian SSR, Soviet Union (now Ukraine)
- Occupation: Poet
- Writing career
- Genre: Ukrainian literature
- Notable work: Icarus with Butterfly Wings
- Notable awards: Shevchenko National Prize, 1994
- Literary movement: Kyiv school of poetry

Vasyl Ivanovych Holoborodko (Ukrainian: Василь Іванович Голобородько, born 7 April 1945) is a Ukrainian poet and representative of the "Kyiv School of Poetry." His poems are characterized by their Ukrainian fairytale-like style. Holoborodko's books have been translated into English, Portuguese, Polish and German. Separate poems have also been translated into French, Romanian, Croatian, Serbian, Spanish, Estonian, Latvian, Lithuanian, Swedish and Russian.

== Biography ==
Holoborodko was born in Ukraine on April 7, 1945, in Adrianopil, a village in Perevalsk Raion, Luhansk Oblast. After graduating boarding school and going to work in a mine where he could earn a better income, Holoborodko continued to read and write poetry, and prepared for his entry into university.

His first book of poetry called "Letyuche vikontse" (Flying Window) was prepared for a publication in 1963, but was not able to be published due to his refusal to collaborate with KGB.

In 1964, he began his study of Ukrainian at the University of Kyiv, and several of his poems appeared in the literary periodicals Literaturna Ukraïna and Dnipro, after which he fell into official disfavor and was no longer published in Ukraine.

In 1966 Holoborodko was expelled from the University of Donetsk, for circulating samizdat literature, including Internationalism or Russification? by Ivan Dziuba (from whom he later received accolades for his work). In 1967 he tried to continue his studies at the Maxim Gorky Literature Institute, but he was not allowed to take exams.

In 1968–1970 he served in the army in the Far East. After this he worked as a miner and in kolkhoz. His poems began to appear again in Ukrainian periodicals after the declaration of glasnost and perestroika in 1985. In 1988, with the change in the political climate, Holoborodko published several collections of poetry and was able to resume his university studies.

Holoborodko was only able to receive his tertiary education in 2001, at the University of Luhansk. He then continued to live in Luhansk, but due to the war in Donbas of 2014, has now relocated to Irpin.

His first poetry collection to be published in Ukraine was in 1988 entitled, Zelen den’ (A Green Day), followed by Ikar na metelykovykh krylakh (An Icarus with Butterly Wings) in 1990 and Kalyna ob Rizdvo (A Viburnum Tree on Christmas) in 1992. A book of his poetry inspired by folk songs and accompanied by his theoretical study of folk customs of match-making in Ukrainian folk fairy tales, was published in Luhansk in 2002 under the title Soloveiku, svatku, svatku... (Nightingale, You Match-Maker...). In 2006, a volume of his selected writings was published under the title My idemo (We Are Going On).

== Awards and recognition ==
- 2014 - Panteleymon Kulish Literary Prize
- 2012 - International Mykola Hohol Award "Triumph"
- 1994 - Shevchenko National Prize for books "Ikar na metelykovyh krylah" (1990) and "Kalyna ob Rizdvi" (1992)
- 1988 - Vasyl Symonenko Prize for the poetry book "Zelen den" (Green Day)

In July 2014 Oksana Zabuzhko proposed to nominate Vasyl Holoborodko for the Nobel Prize in Literature.

== Works ==
- Flying Window (Poetry) «Летюче віконце (Поезії)» (1970)
- Green Day «Зелен день» (1988)
- Icarus with Butterfly Wings «Ікар на метелекових крилах» (1990)
- Nightingale's Mansion «Соловейків теремок» (1991)
- Viburnum at Christmas «Калина об Різдві» (1992)
- Words in Embroidered Shirts «Слова у вишиваних сорочках» (1999)
- Mythopoetic transformation of the Ukrainian Rite of Match-Making in Ukrainian Folk Tales «Міфопоетична трансформація українського обряду сватання в українських народних казках» (2002)
- The Sower «Посівальник» (2002)
- Ukrainian Birds in the Ukrainian Landscape «Українські птахи в українському краєвиді» (2002)
- Dead Cat «Дохла кішка» (2004)
- Flying Window (Collected Poems) «Летюче віконце» (Вибрані вірші) (2005)
- We are Going (Collected Poems) «Ми йдемо» (Вибрані вірші) (2006)
- A Glove Full of Verses «Віршів повна рукавичка» (2010)
- A Cuckoo Bashing Butter «Зозуля масло колотить» (2010)
- White Room Plants «Білі кімнатні рослини» (2013)

== Translations in English ==
- V. Holoborodko, Icarus with butterfly wings & other poems, Toronto : Exile Editions, 1991
