= Ihor Pavlyuk =

Ukrainian writer

- Ігор Павлюк
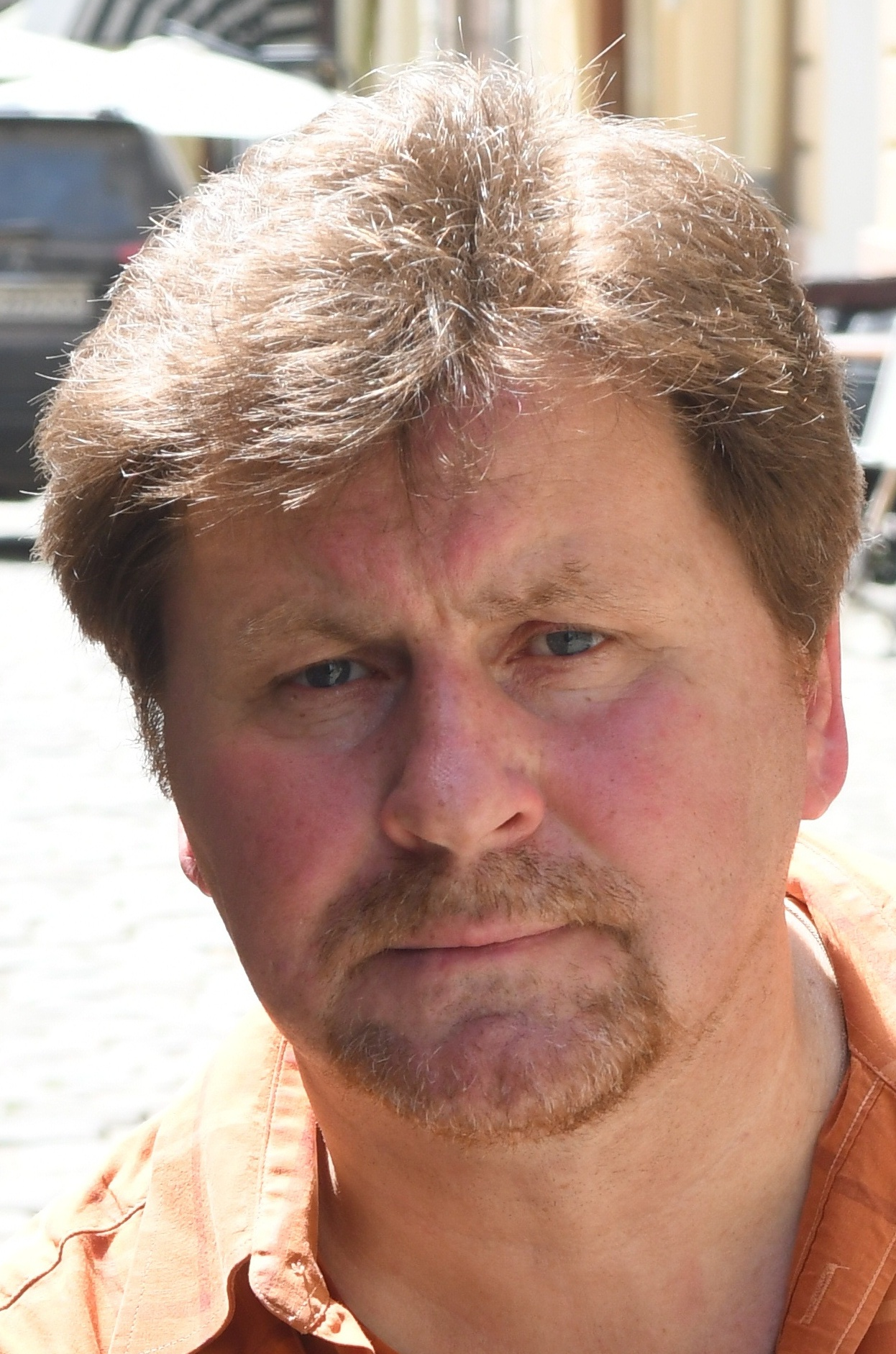
- Ihor Pavlyuk in 2019
- Born: January 1, 1967 (age 59); Rozhysche Raion, Volyn Oblast, Ukraine
- Occupations: poet, novelist, essayist
- Writing career
- Genre: Ukrainian literature
- Notable works: A Flight over the Black Sea (2014), Arthania (2020), Cultivating Diamonds (2026)
- Website: ihor-pavlyuk.ucoz.ru

Ihor Pavlyuk (sometimes spelled as Ihor Pawlyuk, Igor Pavlyk, Igor Pavluk, Ihor Pavyluk; Ukrainian: І́гор Зино́війович Павлю́к, Russian: Игорь Зиновьевич Павлюк, born 1 January 1967 in Rozhysche Raion, Ukrainian SSR) is a Ukrainian writer, translator and research worker. Named People's Poet of Ukraine in 2020.

Honored Worker of Arts of Ukraine (2026).

He is the winner of a 2013 English PEN Award, and the winner of the Switzerland Literary Prize 2021.. He also holds a doctorate in Social Communication, professor.

Ihor Pavlyuk is a member of the English PEN and member of the European Society of Authors, Past Honorary Chancellor of the National Federation of State Poetry Societies (NFSPS) in the USA.

== Life and career ==
Ihor Pavlyuk was born in the Volyn region on January 1, 1967. His mother died ten days after giving birth to him. He was raised by his grandfather and grandmother on his mother's side, both of whom were migrant peasants (Operation Vistula) from the Helm region (now Poland). Ihor Pavlyuk's family on his father's side, also from Volyn, was repressed for participating in the national liberation struggle, sent to a special settlement at Kiselyovsk in 1947 and rehabilitated in 1991.

He studied at the Saint Petersburg military engineering-technical university, which he left to pursue his career as a writer. As a result he was sentenced to a period of hard labour in the Taiga (Zabaykal'skiy region) but continued to write as best he could, driven by a nostalgia for his Ukrainian homeland, until he was freed when the Soviet Union fell.

In 1992, Ihor Pavlyuk graduated with honours from the Department of Journalism at Lviv University. and worked as a correspondent for religious press and radio in Lviv. He has participated in various international literary festivals, including Estonia, Georgia, Russia, Belarus, Germany, Italy, the United States, Poland, Turkey, Ireland, Pakistan, England, Czech Republic, Switzerland, Austria.

Ihor Pavlyuk is presently a Leading Researcher at the Taras Shevchenko Institute of Literature of the National Academy of Sciences of Ukraine in Kyiv, Professor of Ukrainian media at the Ivan Franko National University of Lviv, a member of the editorial boards of literary, art and scientific magazines: "Золота пектораль", "Дзвін", "Українська літературна газета", "Вісник Львівського університету".

Works of Ihor Pavlyuk have been translated into Russian, Belarusian, Polish, English, French, Chinese, Latvian, Bulgarian, Japanese, Italian, and other languages and published in such magazines as "Acumen", "The Apple Valley Review" (Volume 7, Number 2 (Fall 2012), "Muddy River Poetry Review", "Asymptote", "Gold Dust" (Issue 23), "The Adirondack Review", "The Recusant", "Metamorphoses", "Eurasia Review", "The world poets quarterly", "The Guardian", "Critical Muslim" (2022), "Spillwords press" (2023), "Of Poets & Poetry" (2023), Chinese magazines "Fleurs des lettres", «Foreign literature and art (外國文學藝術)», journal of Ukrainian poetry in English, Hindi and Ukrainian language “Uyava Chronicle” (A Trilingual Journal of Ukrainian Poetry), «Sunflowers Rising: Poems For Peace Anthology» and many others.

Ihor Pavlyuk is the protagonist of the film "Between Bug and God" and film "Voice".

The work of Ihor Pavlyuk is included in the official school curriculum with Ukrainian literature.

Ihor Pavlyuk is engaged in charitable activities.

The book of Ihor Pavlyuk "A Flight over the Black Sea" became the winning book within Writers in Translation competition by English PEN club. Academia.edu has included book "A Flight over the Black Sea" in the authoritative list “The Greatest Great Books List Ever”.

On 9 June 2024, Ihor Pavlyuk spoke at the National Federation of State Poetry Societies of the United States of America. and in 2025 he became co-editor and author of the foreword to its international poetry anthology "Sunflowers Rising": Peace Poems Anthology: by Poets for Peace", the proceeds of which go to help orphaned children..

Ihor Pavlyuk is married. His wife Lyudmyla Pavlyuk (Ukrainian: Павлюк Людмила Степанівна is Associate Professor at Department of Journalism of Lviv University. They have two daughters and a grandson.

== Selected publications (books) ==
=== Poetry ===
- Islands of youth (Острови юності), 1990, ISBN 5-7745-0296-1
- Not this of place wind (Нетутешній вітер), 1993, ISBN 5-7745-0546-4
- Voice of daily Moon (Голос денного Місяця), 1994, ISBN 5-333-01392-6
- Glass tavern (Скляна корчма), 1995, ISBN 5-7707-7767-2
- Allergy to eternity (Babylonia) (Алергія на вічність), 1999, ISBN 966-7255-11-5
- Disaster (Стихія), 2002, ISBN 966-8017-04-8
- Masculine fortunetelling (Чоловіче ворожіння), 2002, ISBN 966-665-053-3
- The angel (or) English language? (poems by Ihor Pavlyuk in English), 2004, ISBN 966-665-164-5
- Magma (Магма), 2005, ISBN 966-603-409-3
- Rebellion (Бунт), 2006, ISBN 978-966-361-195-2
- The Tuning Fork (Камертон), 2007, ISBN 978-966-516-267-4
- Lyrics (Лірика), 2008, ISBN 978-966-665-502-1
- Ukraine at smoke (Україна в диму), 2009, ISBN 978-966-626-452-0
- Stratosphere (Стратосфера), 2010, ISBN 978-617-517-024-3
- Catching Gossamers (New York City) (Ловлячи осінні павутинки, Ловя осенние паутинки), 2011, ISBN 9781461089490
- Confessions of the last sorcerer (Saint Petersburg) (Исповедь последнего волхва, Сповідь останнього волхва) (poems by Ihor Pavlyuk in Russian), 2012, ISBN 978-5-91419-730-5
- Masculine fortunetelling (Lublin) (Męskie wróżby (poems by Ihor Pavlyuk in Polish. Translator Tadej Karabovich), 2013, ISBN 978-83-62495-30-6
- Teamster (Kyiv), (Погонич), 2014, Погонщик (poems by modern Russian poet Yevgeny Chigrin in Ukrainian. Translator Ihor Pavlyuk. Forewords by Yevgeny Rein, Ihor Pavlyuk), ISBN 978-617-7015-14-6
- A Flight over the Black Sea (London, Waterloo Press), (Політ над Чорним морем), 2014 (poems by Ihor Pavlyuk in English. Translated from Ukrainian by Stephen Komarnyckyj, foreword to a book written recipient of the Nobel Prize for Literature Mo Yan and Naomi Foyle, Steve Komarnyckyj, Dmytro Drozdovskyi), ISBN 978-1-906742-70-6
- Game and Battle (Гра і битва), 2014, ISBN 978-966-10-4010-5
- Magma of Polissya (Magma polésien: poèmes / Traduction française par Dmytro Tchystiak et Athanase Vantchev de Thracy. Rouen, Christophe Chmomant éditeur, 2015.). (The book of poetry in French, Rouen), ISBN 978-2-84962-319-0
- The Pilgrim: A verse novel (Паломник: Роман-медитація у віршах), 2018. ISBN 978-617-7390-48-9
- Crack (Kyiv) (Трещина, Тріщина) (poems by Ihor Pavlyuk in Russian), 2019, ISBN 978-617-7583-63-8
- Salt (English Edition): Selected Poems (New York, 2019) (Сіль) (poems by Ihor Pavlyuk in English), ISBN 978-109-0994-56-1
- Carrier of dreams (Перевізник мрій), 2019, ISBN 978-966-372-743-1
- Black flax (Чорний льон), 2019, ISBN 978-966-372-756-1
- Arthania: Selected Poems (United States, Dorrance Publishing Company), (Arthania), 2020 (poems by Ihor Pavlyuk in English. Translated from Ukrainian by Yurii Lazirko, editors: Hilary Sheers, Hanna Kosiv. The painting «The Sun» by Andrei Kotzyk was used to illustrate the cover of this book. Foreword to a book written recipient of the Nobel Prize for Literature Mo Yan, ISBN 978-1647023065
- Spas (The Saviour): a book of spiritual lyrics (Спас: книга духовної лірики), 2021, ISBN 978-966-441-639-6
- Cossack Mamay Dance: Poems of 2017-2022 (Танець Мамая: Вірші 2017—2022 років), 2023, ISBN 978-966-986-545-8
- Turf: Lyrics (Торф: Лірика), 2025, ISBN 978-617-8477-66-0
- Kalpna Singh-Chitnis (Калпна Сінг-Чітніс). Bare Soul (Оголена Душа): Poems/ Translator – Ihor Pavlyuk (Ігор Павлюк). Language: English and Ukrainian. Editor – Matvii Smirnov (Матвій Смирнов). – USA: River Paw Press, 2026. – 200 p., ISBN 979-898-9660-72-8

=== Prose ===
- Biography of the tree of tribe of poets (Біографія дерева племені поетів), 2003, ISBN 966-665-053-3
- Forbidden Bloom (Заборонений цвіт), 2007, ISBN 978-966-8770-99-9
- Out of Range (Поза зоною), 2012, ISBN 978-966-10-2806-6
- Cultivation of Diamonds (Вирощування алмазів), 2016, ISBN 978-617-629-336-1
- Mesozoic (Мезозой), 2018, ISBN 978-966-399-477-2
- The Bug (Буг), 2020, ISBN 978-966-914-237-5
- Vacuum (Вакуум), 2022, ISBN 978-617-8000-78-3
- Unity with God. Notes of the poet Ihor Pavlyuk: The first book (Богоєднання. Записки поета Ігоря Павлюка: Книга перша), 2023, ISBN 978-966-441-755-3
- Unity with God. Notes of the poet Ihor Pavlyuk: The second book (Богоєднання. Записки поета Ігоря Павлюка: Книга друга), 2024,, ISBN 978-966-441-793-5
- «Cultivating diamods: Novel and poems. – USA: Buster Bodhi Press, LLC, 2026. – 154 p.»,, ISBN 979-899-915-045-5
- «Pavlyuk Ihor. Written Under Fire: A Ukrainian Poet's Diary. — USA: Buster Bodhi Press, 2026. — 324 p.», ISBN 979-899-915-048-6
- «Pavlyuk Ihor. Mesozoic: A Novel. — Kyiv: Oleh Fedorov Printing House, 2026. — 256 p.», ISBN 978-617-8832-62-9
- Unity with God. Notes of the poet Ihor Pavlyuk: The second book (Богоєднання. Записки поета Ігоря Павлюка: Книга третя), 2026,, ISBN 978-966-441-840-6

=== Drama ===
- The Medium. History of Ukraine in dramatic poem (Бут. Історія України у драматичних поемах), 2024, ISBN 978-966-372-910-7
- Hunger and Love. Poetic Dramaturgy (Голод і любов. Поетична драматургія), 2026, ISBN 978-966-372-979-4

=== Monographs ===
- Writer – Power – Press: historical and typological analysis (Митець – Влада – Преса: історико-типологічний аналіз), 1997, ISBN 966-517-033-3
- Diagnostics and prognosis of lie: digressions in the theory of communication (Діагностика і прогностика брехні: екскурси в теорію комунікації), 2003, ISBN 966-665-129-7
- There are writers in a press (Письменники у пресі), 2010, ISBN 978-966-361-525-7
- Intimate breath of the era. Articles, reviews, interviews (1994—2010). — Volume 1. (Library of the magazine "Golden Pectoral") (Інтимне дихання епохи. Статті, рецензії, інтерв'ю (1994—2010 рр.). — Том 1.), 2017, ISBN 978-966-626-452-0.
- Intimate breath of the era. Articles, reviews, interviews (2010—2015). — Volume 2. (Library of the magazine "Golden Pectoral") (Інтимне дихання епохи. Статті, рецензії, інтерв'ю (2010—2015 рр.). — Том 2.), 2017, ISBN 978-966-626-452-0.
- Intimate breath of the era. Articles, reviews, interviews (1997—2017). — Volume 3. (Library of the magazine "Golden Pectoral") (Інтимне дихання епохи. Статті, рецензії, інтерв'ю (1997—2017 рр.). — Том 3.), 2017, ISBN 978-966-626-452-0.
- Ukrainian literary journalism 1920-2000 s: Monograph (Українська письменницька публіцистика 1920-2000-х років: Монографія) 2019, ISBN 978-620-0-23600-5.
- Stories of emotions: About texts and life texts of modern writers (Історії емоцій: Про тексти та життєтексти сучасних літераторів. – Львів, Світ, 2021. – 352 с.) ISBN 978-966-914-163-7.
- Intimate breath of the era. Articles, interviews (2018—2021). — Volume 4. (Library of the magazine "Golden Pectoral") (Інтимне дихання епохи. Статті, інтерв'ю (2018—2021 рр.). — Том 4.), 2022, ISBN 978-617-7578-18-4.

=== Book for children ===
- The Flying Cauldron (Літаючий казан: п’єса), 2003, ISBN 966-7964-14-0
- Flute: Poems for Schoolchildren ("School Library") (Сопілка: вірші для школярів) («Шкільна бібліотека»), 2017, ISBN 978-966-441-495-8.

== Awards ==
Switzerland Literary Prize

- People's Taras Shevchenko Prize
- Hryhorii Skovoroda prize
- International Nikolai Gogol literary prize "Triumph"
- Winner of a 2013 English PEN Award
- Winner of the Switzerland Literary Prize 2021
- Art prize «Kyiv»
- Dmytro Kremin All-Ukrainian Literary Prize
- International Literary Award named after Leonardo da Vinci (2024)

== See also ==
- Ukrainian literature
- Contemporary Ukrainian literature
