= Volodymyr Tsybulko =

Ukrainian poet and politician

- Цибулько Володимир Миколайович
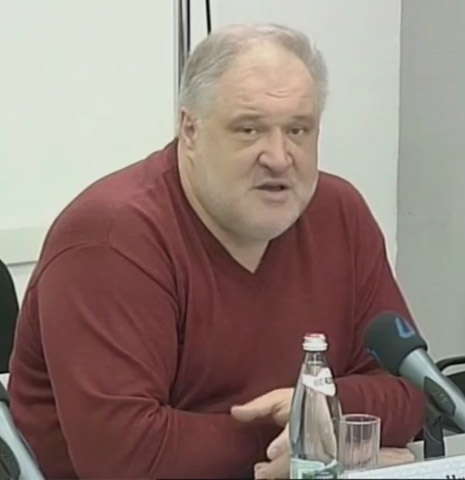
- Volodymyr Tsybulko, Ukrainian politician, former People's Deputy of Ukraine
- Born: May 27, 1964 (age 62); Khmilna, Cherkasy Oblast, Ukrainian SSR, Soviet Union (now Ukraine)
- Education: Kyiv University; Latvian State University
- Occupations: Poet, politician
- Spouse: Uliana (singer)
- Children: Ivan (b. 2001), Denis (b. 2002)
- Writing career
- Language: Ukrainian, Belarusian, English
- Notable works: Key (1988); Tail of a lizard (1991); Pyramid (1992); Angels and texts (1996); Angel of resistance (1997, in Belarusian); Majn Kajf (2000); Angels in a Pyramid (2002, in Ukrainian and English); Selected, pulled, winning, washed... (2003); A book of warnings (2003)
- Website: Official website

Volodymyr Tsybulko (Ukrainian: Цибулько Володимир Миколайович) is a Ukrainian poet and politician. Tsybulko served as a People's Deputy of Ukraine in the Verkhovna Rada during a by-election after Viktor Pynzenyk left the post to become Minister of Finance, serving from 2005 to 2006.

== Early life ==
Volodymyr was born on May 27, 1964, in the village of Khmilna, Cherkasy Oblast, in the Ukrainian SSR of the Soviet Union (in present-day Ukraine). He graduated from the Kyiv University and the Latvian State University majoring in philology. He later studied at the Ternopil Academy of National Economy and the Ukrainian Academy of Banking of the National Bank of Ukraine also.

Tsybulko is an author of a dozen books of poetry in Ukrainian, as well as in Belarusian and English languages: "Key" (1988), "Tail of a lizard" (1991), "Pyramid" (1992), "Angels and texts" (1996), "Angel of resistance" (1997, in Belarusian), "Majn Kajf" (2000), "Angels in a Pyramid" (2002, in Ukrainian and English), "Selected, pulled, winning, washed..." (2003), "A book of warnings" (2003), etc. He was also a director of cultural events in Ukraine during this time before entering politics, including Chervona Ruta, Vyvykh, and Wind from the East.

== Political career ==
In 1995, he became a referent-consultant to the MP Mykola Ratushnyi. For a long time, Tsybulko was an advisor to the third president of Ukraine Viktor Yuschenko. He was elected to the Ukrainian parliament of 4th convocation by the party list of Viktor Yushchenko Bloc Our Ukraine, where he joined a faction of Ukrainian People's Movement. He attempted to for another term later in the 2012 Ukrainian parliamentary election as a self-nominated candidate for the Kyiv single-mandate district No. 220, but lost the race.

== Personal life ==
He speaks Polish, Ukrainian, Belarusian, and English. His wife, Uliana, is a singer. They have two sons, Ivan (2001) and Denis (2002).
