= Dzvinka Matiyash =

Ukrainian prose writer, children's author, poet and translator

- Дзвінка Валентинівна Матіяш
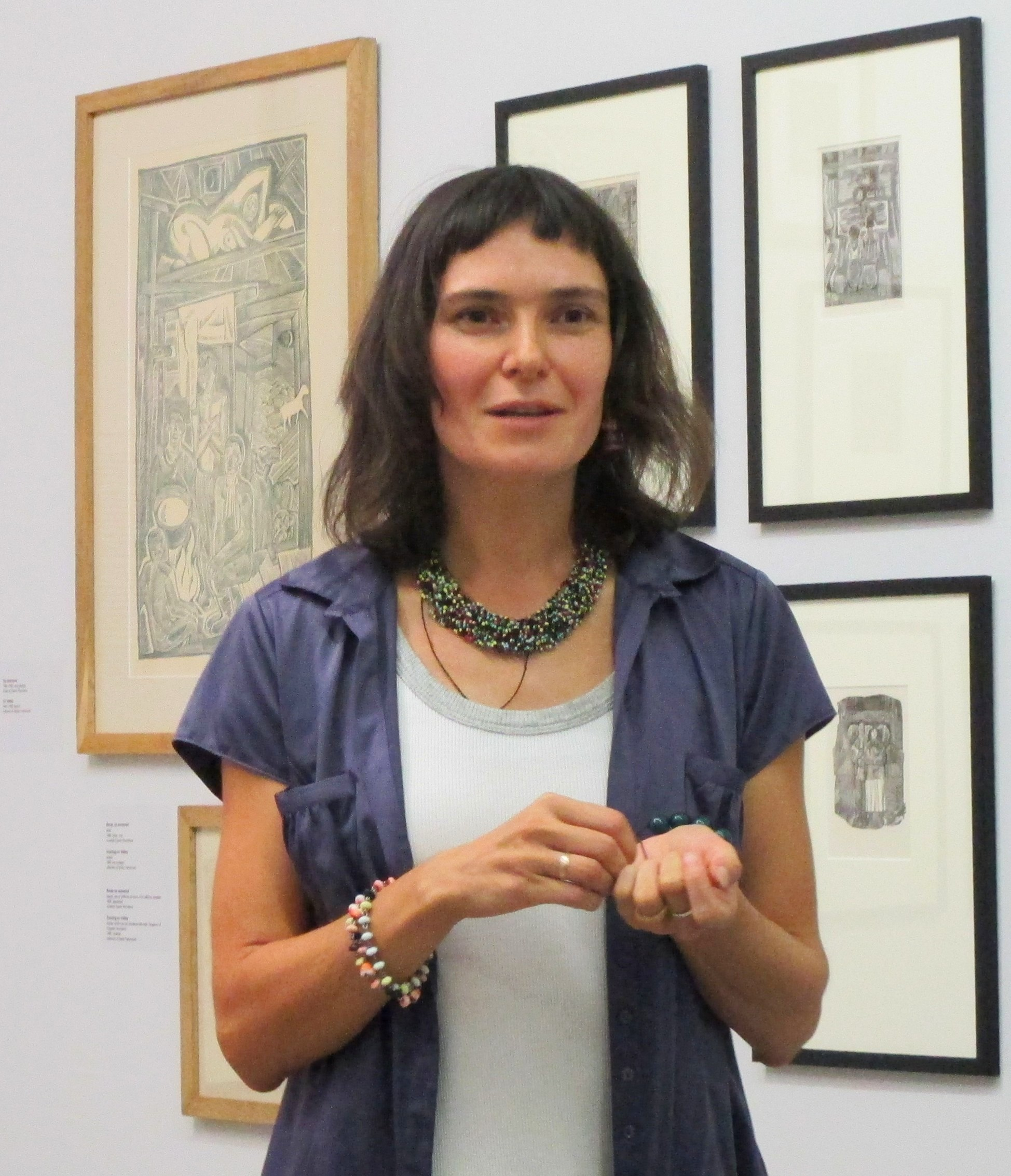
- Born: 16 November 1978 (age 47); Kyiv
- Education: National University of Kyiv-Mohyla Academy
- Occupations: writer, translator

Dzvinka Matiyash (Ukrainian: Дзвінка Валентинівна Матіяш; born 1978) is a Ukrainian prose writer, children's author, poet and translator.

== Early life and education ==
Dzvinka Matiyash was born on 16 November 1978 in Kyiv. One of her sisters is the poet Bohdana Matiyash. From 1995 to 2002 she studied literature at the National University of Kyiv-Mohyla Academy, then continued her education with postgraduate studies at the European Collegium of Polish and Ukrainian Universities (2002–2006) in Lublin, Poland.

== Career ==
Dzvinka Matiyash debuted in 2005 with a meditative book of prose titled A Requiem for November and has since published works for adults and children. Her books have received two nominations for the BBC Ukrainian Book of the Year title and the French translation of Stories of Roses, Rain and Salt by Justine Donche-Horetska was nominated for the 2020 Drahomán Prize. Works by Matiyash have been translated to Polish, French, Chinese, English, German, Italian and Serbian.

Matiyash's writing is praised for stylistically masterful monologues which invoke the tradition started by Yuriy Izdryk and Taras Prokhasko. Her prose is considered clear and often touching upon the philosophical, with themes of beauty, goodness and God. She draws inspiration from Catholic mysticism.

She translates from Polish, Belarusian, Russian and English. Among her published book translations are works by poets Andrei Khadanovich and Jan Twardowski, as well as texts by the Polish journalist Ryszard Kapuściński.

== Publications ==
- Реквієм для листопаду ("A Requiem for November"), 2005
- Роман про батьківщину ("A Novel about My Homeland"), 2006
- Казки П’ятинки, 2010
- Історії про троянди, дощ і сіль ("Stories About Roses, Rain and Salt"), 2012
- День Сніговика, 2014
- Марта з вулиці Святого Миколая, 2015
- Перше Різдво, 2016
- Дорога святого Якова, 2017
- Подарунок від святого Миколая, 2018
- Мене звати Варвара, 2021
- Histoires sur les roses, la pluie et le sel, translator Justine Donche-Horetska, Paris: les Éditions Bleu & jaune, DL 2020. ISBN 9791094936092
