= Mykola Vorobyov =

Ukrainian poet

Mykola Panasovych Vorobyov (born 12 October 1941 in Melnykivka) is a Ukrainian poet. He is a founding member of the Kyiv School of Poetry He won a 2005 Shevchenko National Prize in Literature.

In 1968, he was expelled from Taras Shevchenko National University of Kyiv.

== Works ==
- «Букініст» (1966)
- «Без кори» (1967)
- «Пригадай на дорогу мені» (1985)
- «Місяць шипшини» (1986)
- «Ожина обрію» (1988)
- «Прогулянка одинцем» (1990)
- «Верховний голос» (1991)
- «Іскри в слідах» (1993)
- «Човен» (1999)
- «Срібна рука» (2000)
- «Слуга півонії» (2003)
- «Оманливий оркестр» (2006)
- «Без кори. Вибране» (2007)
- «Скринька з прикрасами» (2014)
- «Гора і квітка» (2018)
- «Намальовані двері» (2019)

=== Works in English ===
- Wild Dog Rose Moon, 1992 Exile Editions, ISBN 9781550961652
- Mountain and Flower: The Selected Poems of Mykola Vorobiov, Maria G. Rewakowicz translator, Lost Horse Press, 2020 ISBN 9781733340052
