= Myroslav Laiuk =

Ukrainian poet

- Myroslav Laiuk on the book fair Frankfurt (Germany) October 2026.
- Born: 31 July 1990 (age 36)
- Education: National University of "Kyiv-Mohyla Academy"
- Occupations: Novelist, poet, screenwriter
- Writing career
- Language: Ukrainian

Myroslav Laiuk (Ukrainian: Мирослав Миколайович Лаюк; born 31 July 1990) is a Ukrainian writer.

== Biography and artworks ==
Myroslav Laiuk was born in 1990 in Smodna, Kosiv Raion, Ivano-Frankivsk Oblast, Ukraine.

Living in Kyiv, Ukraine he graduated from National University of Kyiv-Mohyla Academy and received a PhD degree for "Philosophy and Literature" program there. Since 2018, Laiuk teaches a creative writing course at his alma-mater university.

In 2018, Myroslav Laiuk was included to the list of Top 30 Under 30 of 2018 by Kyiv Post, an award for young innovative Ukrainians achieving outstanding results in different fields.

His works are translated into different foreign languages, with published books in Lithuania, Slovakia, Belarus, and Poland.

In 2018, he became a recipient of the Emerging Writer on Tour award. He was a participant of Poetry Africa Festival (South Africa), Festival of World Literature (Croatia), Authors' Reading Month (Czech Republic, Slovakia, Poland, Ukraine), StAnza (Scotland International Poetry Festival), and others.

His first poetry book Osote! (tr: Thistle!) was published in 2013. The book was awarded the Smoloskyp Prize, Kovalevykh Foundation Prize and Litakcent Roku Award as the best poetry book of the year in Ukraine. The second poetry book, Metrophobia (2015) was also awarded by Litakcent Roku as the best poetry book of 2015. Myroslav's debut novel, Babornia (tr: The Old Ladies House) (2016) was shortlisted by the Book of the Year BBC Award, Espresso Readers Choice Prize and Litakcent Roku Award. It was named as the strongest debut and one of the most remarkable books of the year by numerous Ukrainian media.

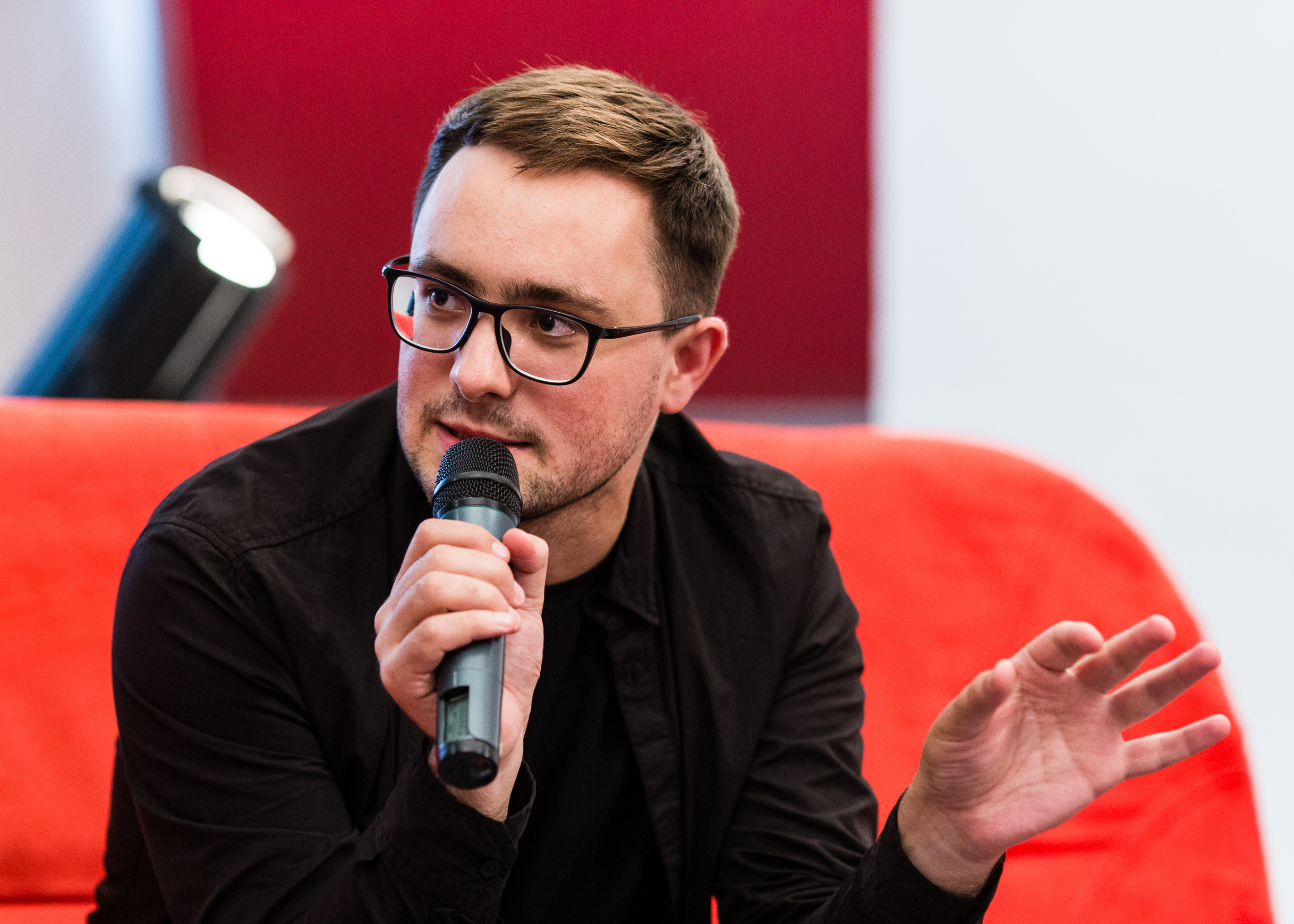
Myroslav Laiuk on Authors’ Reading Month 2019, Wrocław, Poland

In 2018, he compiled Anthology of Young Ukrainian Poetry of the III Millennium. In 2019 Myroslav became a host of the show «The Poetry Time» on UA: PBC.

== Books ==
- Thistle! (Осоте!) : [poetry]. — Kyiv, 2013. — 224 p.
- Metrophobia (Метрофобія) : [poetry]. — Lviv : Old Lion Publishing House, 2015. — 176 p.
- Old Women's House (Баборня): [novel]. — Lviv : Old Lion Publishing House, 2016. — 304 p.
- The World is not Created (Світ не створений): [novel]. — Lviv : Old Lion Publishing House, 2018. — 288 p.
- Rose (Троянда) : [poetry]. — Lviv : Old Lion Publishing House, 2019. — 176 p.
- Zaurys and his brother (Заврик і його молодший брат): [children's literature]. — Lviv : Old Lion Publishing House, 2019. — 36 p.
- Kivi Kivi (Ківі Ківі): [children's literature]. — Lviv : Old Lion Publishing House, 2020. — 64 p.
- Iron Water (Залізна вода): [novel]. — Lviv : Old Lion Publishing House, 2021. — 264 p.
- Bakhmut, 2025

== English publications ==
- “calm rhythm” — a poem by Myroslav Laiuk — New Statesman
- poems by Myroslav Laiuk — Poetry International
- Myroslav Laiuk — Agenda — Four poems (pp. 28 – 30)
- poems — The Frontier: 28 Contemporary Ukrainian Poets, An Anthology
- The World is not Created, fragments — New Books from Ukraine – 2019 — The Ukrainian Book Institute for The Frankfurt Book Fair)
- Iron Water, excerpt — Apofenie

== Book translations ==
- Metrofobia — poetry, translated into Polish by Marcin Gaczkowski, Kolegium Europy Wschodniej;
- Zaurus and his Brother — children book, translated into Belarusian and Slovak.

== Sources ==
- Myroslav Laiuk at Poetry International
- Myroslav Laiuk at Versopolis
- Myroslav Laiuk at New Statesman
- Meet the winners of Top 30 Under 30 of 2018
