= A Duckling Swims in the Tisza =

Ukrainian folk song

"Пливе кача по Тисині"
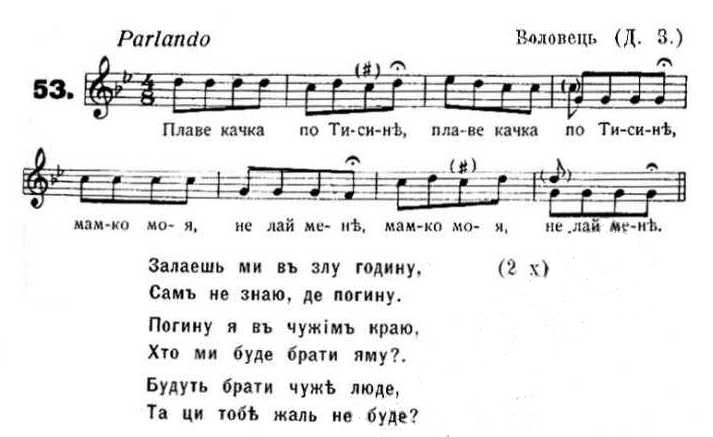

Song by: Vira Baganych; Oksana Bilozir and Victor Morozov; Pikkardiyska Tertsiya; Plach Yeremiyi; Taras Chubay; Skryabin
- Language: Lemko dialect
- English title: A Duckling Swims in the Tisza
- Released: 1944
- Genre: Ukrainian folk music

Performance of the song by Revutsky Chapel

'A Duckling Swims in the Tisza" (Ukrainian: «Пливе́ ка́ча по Тиси́ні», romanized: Plyve kacha po Tysyni), also known as 'Hey, a Duckling Swims in the Tisza" («Гей, пливе кача по Тисині», Hey, plyve kacha po Tysyni) is a Lemko folk song that became well-known in the 21st century Ukraine due to its frequent use as a requiem for protestors killed during the 2013-2014 Euromaidan, the 2014 Revolution of Dignity, and the ongoing Russo-Ukrainian War.

== Origins ==
According to the Ukrainian foklorist Ivan Khlanta, "A Duckling Swims in the Tiszla" was first recorded by Ukrainian conductor Dezső Zádor in the village of Volovets in Zakarpattia Oblast in the 1940s. However, the text of the composition is present in an earlier folklore collection published by ethnographer Vasyl Grendzha-Donsky in Uzhhorod in 1923. The song was first published in the 1944 compilation album Narodni pisni pidkarpatskikh rusyniv (English: "folk songs of the Subcarpathian Ruthenians").

In traditional versions of the song, the lyrics follow the life and death of a young woman who refuses to marry a man she does not love, going against her mother's wishes. During the 1940s, the lyrics were substantially reworked by the Transcarpathian writer Vasyl Grendzha-Donsky to tell the story of a soldier preparing to go to war. In most versions of the lyrics, the titular duckling crossing the river represents death and passage to the afterlife.

== History of recordings ==
=== 1960s to 1980s ===
The first known public performance of "A Duckling Swims in the Tisza" is believed to have occurred during the 1960s, by Transcarpathian folk singer Vira Baganych. In 1972, a recording of Baganych performing the song was included on the compilation album Melodiya (Russian: Мелодия, lit. 'Melody').

In 1986, "A Duckling Swims in the Tisza" re-emerged on the Ukrainian cultural scene when it was added to the repertoire of the Lviv-based musical ensemble Vatra. It was first performed by soloist Oksana Bilozir, and was subsequently performed as part of a duet between Bilozir and Victor Morozov.

In 1988, the song was recorded by the Ukrainian Canadian band Cheremshina Ensemble, and was included in their album Cheremshina (volume 3).

=== 2000s to the present ===
In 2000, "A Duckling Swims in the Tisza" was included in the album Nashi partyzany (Ukrainian: Наші партизани, lit. 'Our partisans') performed by Taras Chubay, Plach Yeremiyi, and Skryabin. The song enjoyed more commercial success in 2002 when it was included on a cappella group Pikkardiyska Tertsiya's album Eldorado.

"A Duckling Swims in the Tisza" subsequently became a staple of Ukrainian choirs, including the Revutsky Academic Choir and the Kyiv Orthodox Theological Academy Choir. The song was performed at the Festival Internazionale Musica Sacra Virgo Lauretana in Italy.

In 2015, the Danish neofolk band Die Weisse Rose performed a cover of "A Duckling Swims in the Tisza" during a performance in Kyiv; a recording was subsequently included in their live album White Roses in Bloom in Kyiv.

== Use during the Euromaidan and subsequent events ==
In January 2014, a 2002 recording of "A Duckling Swims in the Tisza" by Pikkardiyska Tertsiya was used during the funeral of Belarusian Euromaidan activist Mykhailo Zhyznevskyi, who had previously shared with friends that the song was among his favourites. The song's lyrics and meaning have led to it being frequently used in memorials for killed protestors in the Euromaidan, the Revolution of Dignity, and the Russo-Ukrainian War, with it being called the "unofficial anthem" for fallen protestors and soldiers.

An instrumental version the song (a set of variations) was written by Roman Turovsky in several versions, for lute, theorbo, harpsichord, and organ.

== Russian use during the siege of Mariupol ==
In 2022, pro-Russian performers Akim Apachev and Daria Frey performed a cover of "A Duckling Swims in the Tisza" under the name "Пливе кача" (plyve kacha, "a duckling swims"), set to footage of the siege of Mariupol. That same year, Russian state-controlled television channel RT released a music video for the song filmed in the ruins of the Azovstal Iron and Steel Works. YouTube subsequently removed the video due to it breaching its policy on hate speech.
