= Hryhoriy Chubay =

Hryhoriy "Hrytsko" Chubay (Ukrainian: Григорій (Грицько) Чубай, also transliterated as Hryhorii Chubai; 23 January 1949, Berezyny, Rivne Oblast – 16 May 1982, Lviv) was a poet, translator and one of the central figures of Ukrainian underground culture under the Soviet rule. His main work is a collection of poems known as Pentateuch (Пʼятикнижжя). Chubay became a victim of government repression due to his participation in samvydav publications.

== Biography ==
Born in Volhynia, Chubay moved to Lviv in 1969 and gained popularity in local underground circles with his poem Vertep (1968), taking its name from a Ukrainian nativity play. Through his acquaintances Ihor and Iryna Kalynets, Chubay established contacts with the Ukrainian dissident movement and its illegal publications. He belonged to a circle of Lviv's nonconformist artistic youth, which included Oleh Lysheha, Viktor Morozov, Mykola Riabchuk, Roman Kis, Yuriy Vynnychuk and others.

In 1971 Chubay took part in publication of the almanac Skrynia ("The Chest"), which, among others, featured his poems and a translation of a play by Tadeusz Różewicz. Despite its apolitical content, the publication was considered subversive by the KGB. As a result, in 1972 Chubay was arrested and spent three days in a KGB prison as part of a wider crackdown against the dissident movement. After being released from under arrest, Chubay found himself in an isolated position, unable to find meaningful employment. In 1978 he managed to enroll in the Maxim Gorky Literature Institute in Moscow. He died in 1982 at the age of 33. In 1995 Chubay's remains were reburied at Lychakiv Cemetery.

== Poetry ==
Chubay was influenced by European modernist literature, and his achievement lies in continuing the legacy of Ukrainian modernism in spite of its suppression by Soviet authorities. His poems are characterized with complex metaphors and religious imagery, and explore themes of conformity, isolation, human companionship. His oeuvre and his persona had a big influence on the new generation of Ukrainian authors, which emerged during the 1980s (so-called Eightiers), and in independent Ukraine, Chubay's life and works achieved a cult status.

== Legacy ==
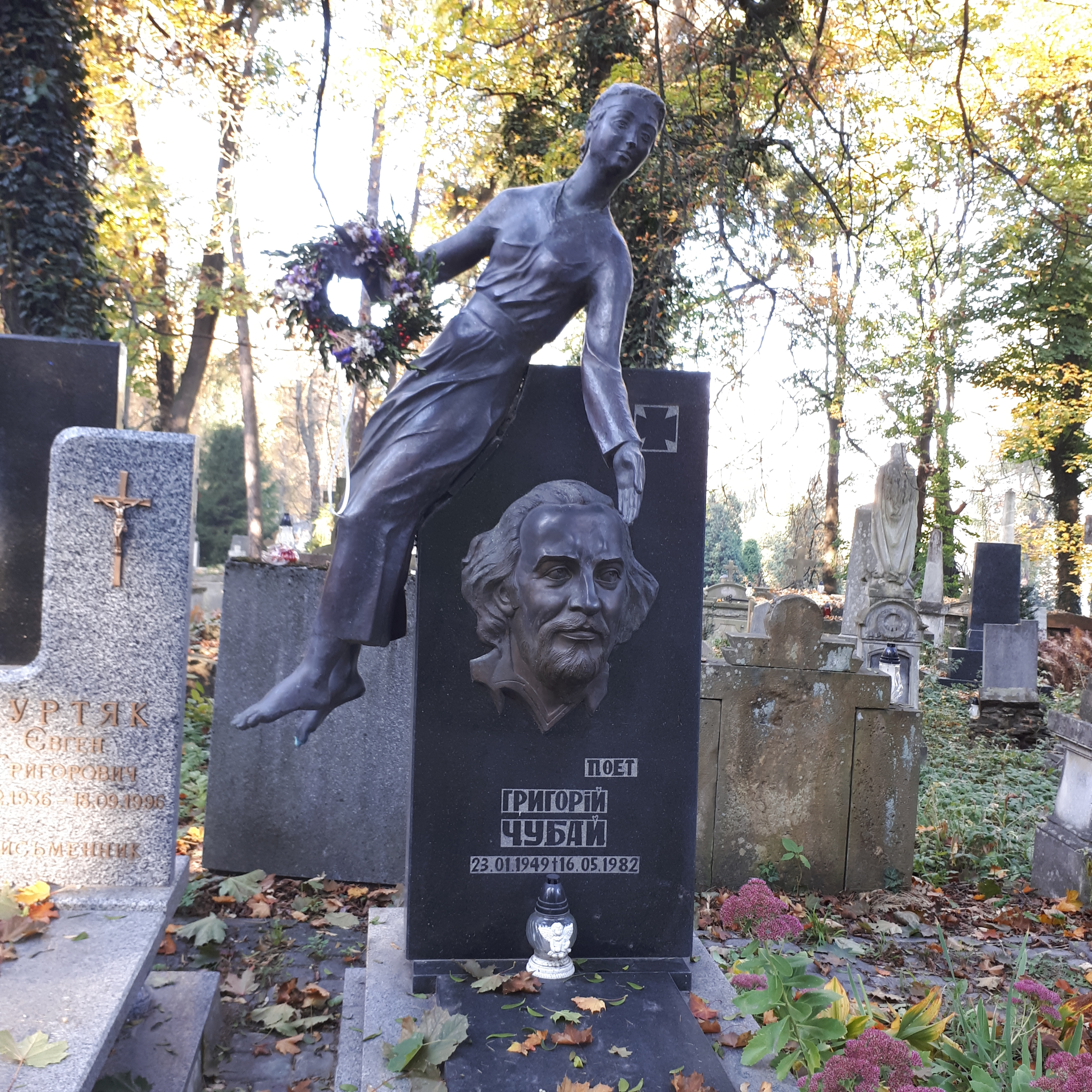
Grave of Hryhoriy Chubay in Lviv

Chubay's works have been analyzed by literary critics and scholars, including Yuriy Andrukhovych. His poems have been translated into several languages, including English, Polish, Spanish and Russian. Many of Chubay's texts have been set to music, with some of them being performed by his son Taras Chubay. In 2014 a documentary film dedicated to Hryhoriy Chubay was created by Oleksandr Fraze-Frazenko.

In 2023, one of the streets of Lviv was renamed after Hrytsko Chubay.

== Family ==
Hryhoriy Chubay was the father of Ukrainian musicians Taras and Solomiya Chubay.

== List of works ==
- Pentateuch (Пʼятикнижжя):
  - I.Silhouette of the Voice (Постать голосу)
  - II.Vertep (Вертеп, 1968)
  - III.Search for the Involved (Відшукування причетного)
  - IV.Jeremiah's Lament (Плач Єремії, 1969)
  - V.Light and Confession (Світло і сповідь, 1970)

Posthumous publications:

- Speaking, staying silent and speaking again (Говорити, мовчати і говорити знову, 1990)
- Jeremiah's Lament (1999)
- Tongue Twisters are Not For Wolves (Скоромовка не для вовка, 2008) - children's poems
- Pentateuch (2013)
