= Taras Prokhasko =

Ukrainian writer

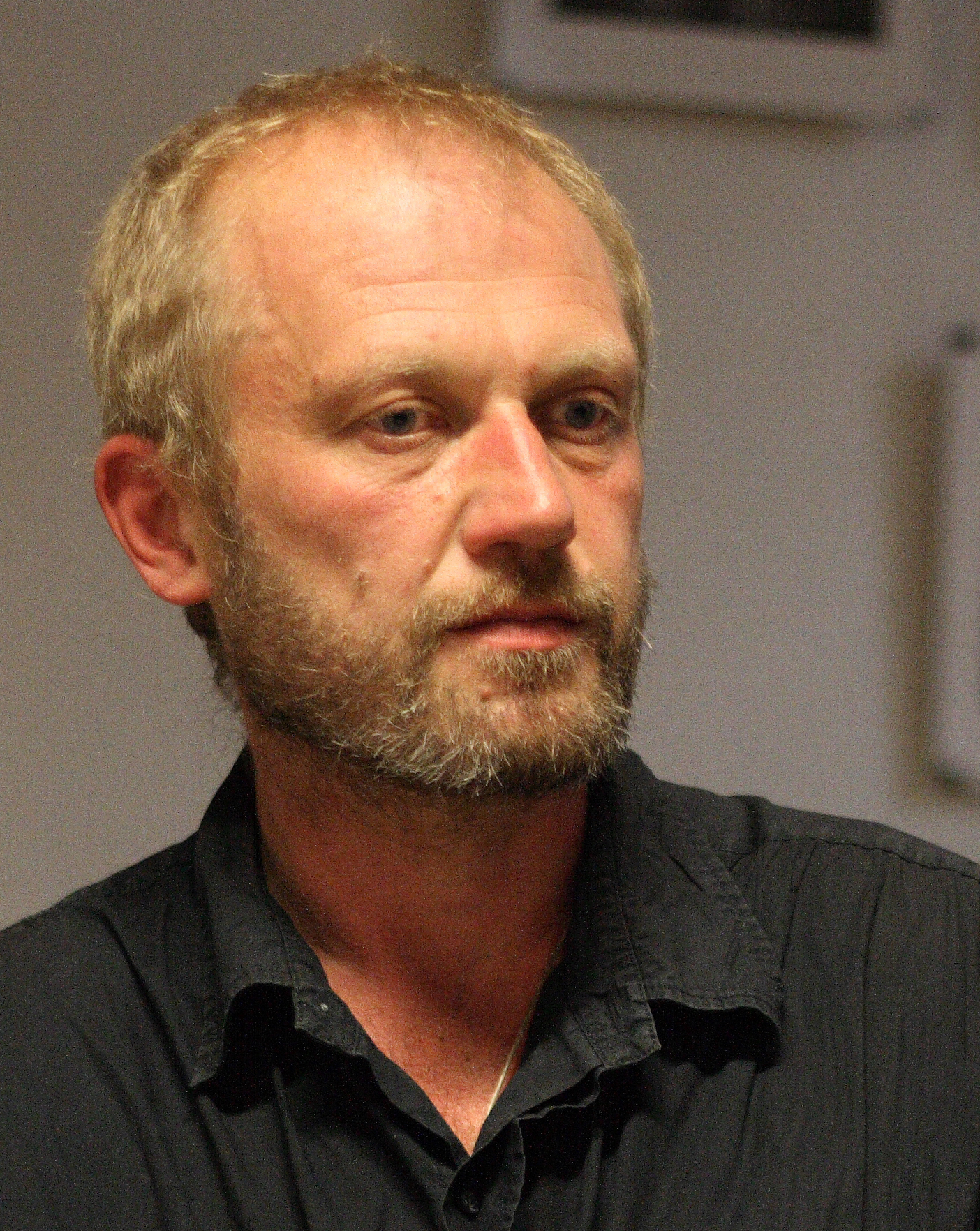
- Born: 16 May 1968 (age 58); Ivano-Frankivsk, Ukrainian SSR, Soviet Union
- Occupations: novelist, essayist
- Writing career
- Genre: Ukrainian literature
- Notable work: The UnSimple (2002)
- Literary movement: Stanislav phenomenon

Taras Prokhasko (Ukrainian: Тарас Богданович Прохасько; born 16 May 1968) is a Ukrainian novelist, essayist and journalist. Together with Yuri Andrukhovych a major representative of the Stanislav phenomenon, a group of postmodernist writers in Ivano-Frankivsk. Writing of Taras Prokhasko is often associated with magical realism, his novel «The UnSimple» has been compared to One Hundred Years of Solitude by Gabriel García Márquez. Biologist by education Prokhasko's prose has been called to have features of "philosophy of a plant" for its dense and meditative character.

== Biography ==
Taras Prokhasko decided to become a writer when he was 12 years old.

From 1989 to 1991, he participated in student protests for Ukraine's independence, including the Revolution on Granite, and began writing during this time.

In 1992, Prokhasko graduated with a degree in botany from Lviv University.

From 1992 to 1993, after graduation, he worked various jobs, including as a school teacher, bartender, and animator at "Vezha" radio, as well as in art galleries, newspapers, on TV, and at the Ivano-Frankivsk Institute of Carpathian Forestry.

From 1992 to 1994, he edited the avant-garde literary magazine "Chetver" (Ukrainian: Четвер, lit. 'Thursday').

In 1993 and 1994 he acted in short films "Flowers of St. Francis" and "Escape to Egypt" (winner of the Delyatyn video art festival). Worked as a journalist at "Express", "Postup", "Telekrytyka" and "Halytskyi korespondent" newspapers.

In 2004 Prokhasko spent several months in Kraków on the «Stowarzyszenie Willa Decjusza — Homines Urbani» foundation scholarship.

== Family ==
He is nephew of writer Iryna Vilde and brother of translator and essayist Yurko Prokhasko. Prokhasko is a father of three sons.

== Awards and recognition ==
- 1997 – Smoloskyp prize
- 2006 – first prize for fiction from "Korespondent" journal
- 2007 – third prize for documentary writing from "Korespondent" journal
- 2007 – Joseph Conrad prize from the Polish Institute in Kyiv
- 2013 – BBC Book of the Year, Litakcent roku for "Who will make the snow"
- 2019 – BBC Book of the Year, Essays category, for "Tak, ale…" (Ukrainian: Так, але..., lit. 'Yes, but…')
- 2020 – Taras Shevchenko National Award of Ukraine for the book "Tak, ale…"
- 2023 – The Best Children’s Books of 2023 of The New York Times for the book "Who Will Make the Snow?"

== Bibliography ==
- Other Days of Anna (Інші дні Анни)
- FM Halychyna (FM Галичина)
- The UnSimple (НепрОсті)
- Lexicon of Mysterious Knowledge (Лексикон таємних знань)
- One Could Make Several Stories from This (З цього можна зробити кілька оповідань)
- Port Frankivsk (Порт Франківськ)
- «Ukraina» together with Serhiy Zhadan
- «Galizien-Bukowina-Express» with Jurko Prokhasko and Magdalena Blashchuk
- Cause it's This Way (БотакЄ) /
- Who Will Make the Snow (Хто зробить сніг) with Maryana Prokhasko
- One and the Same (Одної і тої самої)
- Taras Prokhasko conducted a series of long interviews with contemporary Ukrainian writers and intellectuals (Oleh Lysheha, Yuriy Izdryk, Yuri Andrukhovych, Oksana Zabuzhko, Borys Gudziak, Yaroslav Hrytsak, Vasyl Herasymyuk), which were published in "The Other Format" book series
- Yes but... (Так, але...)
- Because it is so (Бо є так)

== Translations ==
Prokhasko's writings were translated in English, German, Polish, Hungarian, Belarusian and Russian.

=== Texts available in English ===
- «Necropolis» in «Two Lands, New Visions» (1998) anthology
- «The UnSimple», 2011
- FM Galicia
