= Taras Chubay =

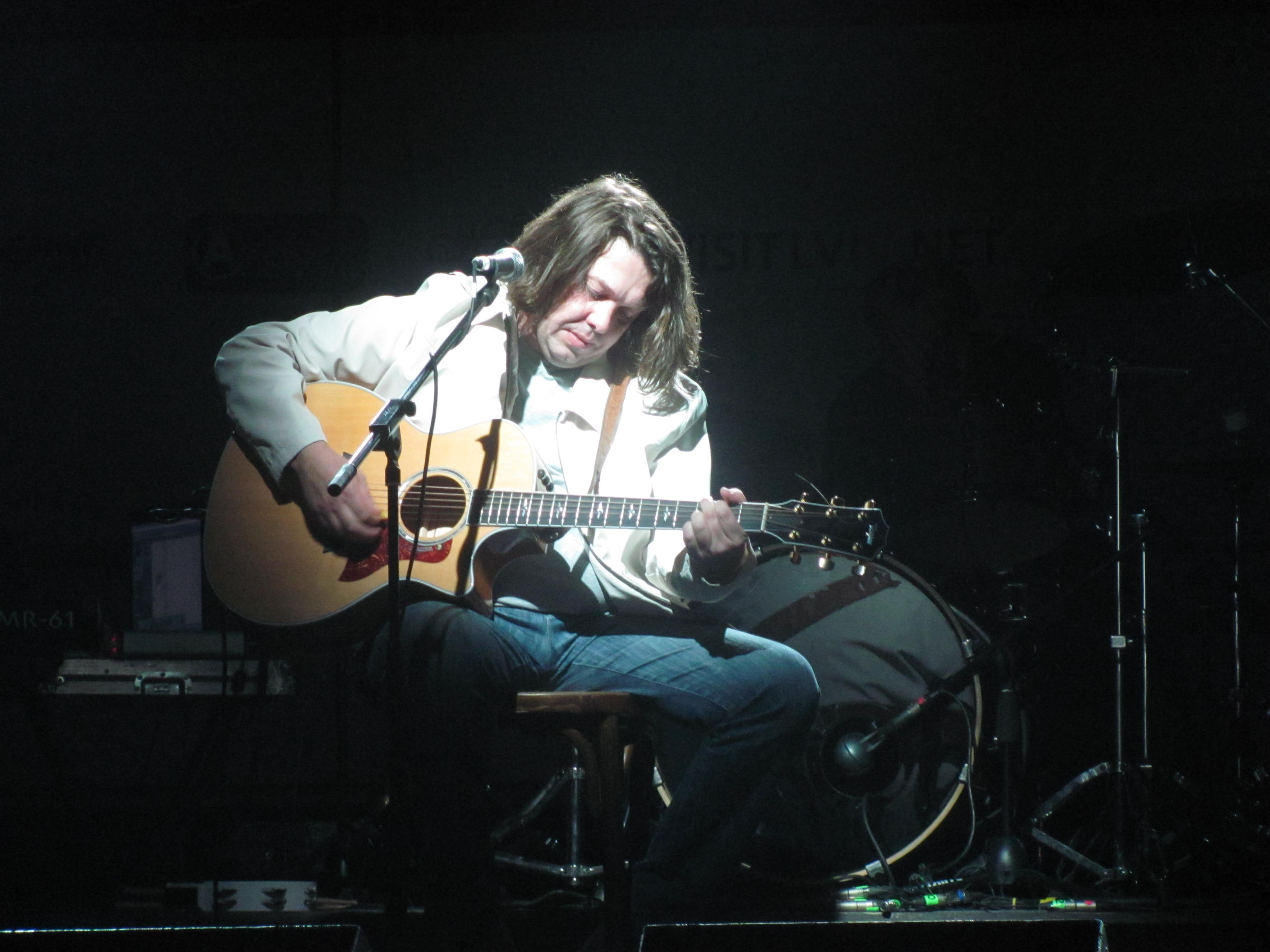
Chubay in 2011

Taras Hryhorovych Chubay (Ukrainian: Тарас Григорович Чубай), (born on 21 June 1970 in Lviv) is a Ukrainian musician and poet, singer and composer, leader of the Ukrainian rock band Plach Yeremiyi.

== Biography and personal life ==
Taras Chubay was born on 21 June 1970 in the city of Lviv in the family of poet Hryts'ko Chubay and his wife Halyna.

In 1976, young Taras went to the Opera and Ballet House for the first time. Together with his father, they attended Czeslaw Neman's concert. Taras primarily grew up on Czeslaw's music, and thanks to him, Taras later began singing poetry.

Taras studied at the “Lviv Krushelnytski Music School”, where he played in the orchestra. While all the boys played football, Taras rigorously practised the violin. Chubay already knew all about what they were learning in school at that time, which is why he never showed up to classes in Grades 7 and 8."

In 1982 his father died, but his poetry, library, and music library had remained which was all ground on which Taras grew. Thanks to his father, Taras Chubay had a passion for music. He discovered his father's poetry many years after his death, around 5-7 years. Chubay realized that these must be sung so that more people can hear his father's voice in the poems. This is one of the reasons why Taras began making music in the first place. Taras' father - a sample of high poetry, his authority does not allow Taras writing songs with random and meaningless text.

His love for rock music began as a young schoolboy when he played keyboard for his band “Cyclone”, from 1984 to 1986. It was then that Taras met Vsevolod Dyachyshyn – the band's bassist, with whom he plays to this day. They gathered at the club by the village's hospital emergency room and rehearsed. They even managed to perform their very own concert: they printed their tickets themselves and then their friends sell them for rubles. They sold around three or four hundred tickets which at that time represented a substantial sum of money.

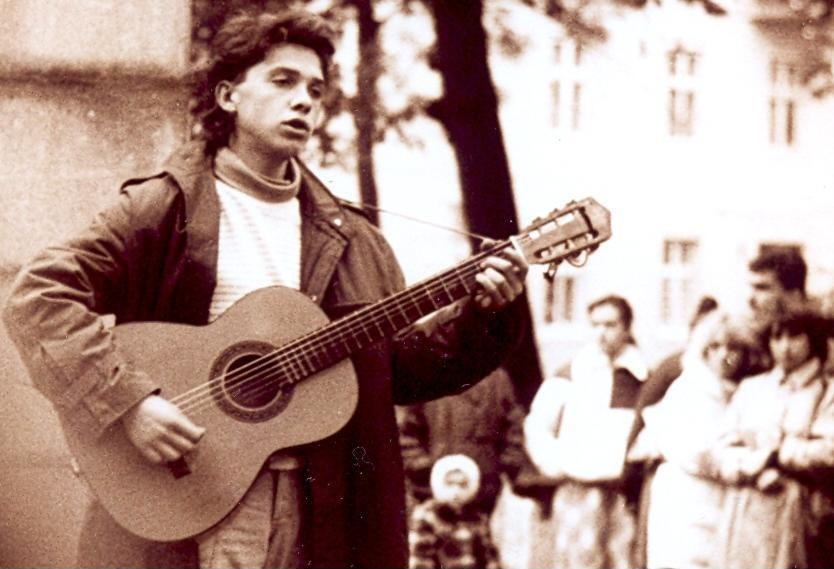
Chubay performing at a concert in memory of Bohdan-Ihor Antonych in Lviv, 1987

In the summer of 1987, Chubay picked up a guitar and in two days, he learned how to play it and in the following two weeks, he had about thirty or forty songs written (some of which he still uses today). Taras played his first song “Koly do hub tvoyikh” for his mother and only after the consent of his mother, Chubay began to perform that song. After another two weeks Taras appeared on stage, and then went on tour.

Together with other figures of Lviv’s alternative culture scene (Viktor Morozov, Iurii Vynnychuk), Taras formed the cabaret group Ne Zhurys’ (Don’t Worry), which performed for thousands in glasnost-era, and post-Soviet, Ukraine, as well as abroad. The group satirized Soviet existence and unearthed both new Ukrainian culture and proscribed past cultural achievements.

In 1991, Taras formed the rock band Plach Ieremii (Jeremiah’s Cry) which quickly became one of the most popular bands in newly independent Ukraine. Composing and performing songs to verse written by poets of a new literary generation emerging in post-Soviet Ukraine (such as Viktor Neborak, Yurii Andrukhovych, Kostiantyn Moskalets’ and Ivan Malkovych), Taras played a central role in the advancement of post-Soviet Ukrainian literature in the 1990s.

He graduated from the Lviv Conservatory (class of viola). From 1988 to 1990, he participated in performances of the theatre-studio "Don't Worry”. In 1990, Taras started a band with his bassist Vsevolod Dyachyshyn called "Plach Yeremiyi", which for several years has taken a leading position in the charts Ukrainian music.

In 1999, Chubay moved to Kyiv for Olha, the girl he fell in love with, after meeting her at a Plach Yeremiyi concert in Austria. They had a difficult time adapting to life in Kyiv with only two hundred dollars in their pocket, yet they managed to find friends to stay with for seven or eight months until they rented their own apartment. Shortly thereafter, Taras and Olha got married.

In 2006, their first daughter Melanie, was born and on 5 November 2007 Taras became a father for the second time to another girl, Ivanka. On 28 June 2010 Taras and Olha had a son. In March 2008 on "New Channel" project launched author Taras - music program "Live Sound". In 2008, the President of Ukraine awarded Taras Chubay the title of Merited Artist of Ukraine.

Chubay's hit "Vona" was a real lyrical and romantic archetype turbulent in the 1990s. Thanks to him, the same young people across the country sang a rebel song "Lenta Za Lentoyu." Sometimes Taras and his wife organize house concerts: Taras - viola, Olha - piano and the children, listening.

Taras resided in Hostomel, near Kyiv, until he had to flee due to the Russian invasion in 2022. His home studio was damaged by missiles and the collection of guitars got stolen.

== Other information ==
Taras Chubay founded the Plach Yeremiji rock band in February, 1990. The songs of Chubay and his band are usually serious, philosophical poems accompanied by rock.

The musician has created more than 100 songs and one overture for an orchestra. He is also known for his active social position, taking part in democratic and pro-European movement gatherings. The old UPA song Lenta za Lentoyu performed by Chubay had become a hit at events organized by the "orange forces" and was performed at the meetings of Narodna Samooborona Movement.

In 2006, the rock band Plach Yeremiji and its frontman took part in the "Concert for Angels" devoted to the memory of Kyiv students killed during the Battle of Kruty.

Taras has recorded several albums including "Dveri kotri naspravdi ye" (the Doors Which really are) and "Nai bude vse iak ye" (Let all be as Is), which introduced the hits Vona (She), Hryfon (the Griffin) and Litaiucha Holova (Flying Head) to fans of Ukrainian music.

Taras has also recorded three albums featuring his interpretations of traditional and popular songs—the songs of Volodymyr Ivasiuk, Ukrainian Insurgent army songs, and Ukrainian Christmas carols. Taras has performed in Eastern and Western Europe, Canada, and the U.S., as well as at over one hundred concerts in Ukraine, including a 2003 solo performance at Kyiv’s Palace "Ukraine".
