= The Moscoviad =

1992 novel by Yurii Andrukhovych

The Moscoviad (Ukrainian: Московіада) is a 1992 novel by Ukrainian author Yuri Andrukhovych. His second novel, it was translated from the original Ukrainian into English by Vitaly Chernetsky in 2009. It may be regarded as a part of the trilogy which also includes Perverzion and Recreations. The three novels are not logically connected but all of them feature the postmodern style and deal with the same type of the protagonist — a picaresque Ukrainian poet. The Moscoviad depicts the adventures of Otto von F., a student of Moscow Literary Institute, which take place in the course of one summer day in 1991 in Moscow shown as a diverse, multicultural and disorganized city controlled by KGB and having imperial ambitions. The text is written in a rich and vivid language, exhibiting the elements of magic realism and mentioning multiple historical and cultural figures. Although the original text's language is Ukrainian, it contains many sentences in Russian and German spelled in Ukrainian for a more pronounced comic effect.

== Plot summary ==
Although the novel has one clearly defined plot of action, the narrative is sometimes interrupted by the hero's reminiscences as well as by his appeals to the fictitious Ukrainian king Olelko the Second. Other non-linear elements include alternative outcomes (endings) and multiple references to famous historical and cultural figures who do not appear directly in the novel.

Ukrainian poet Otto von F. wakes up in his Moscow dormitory room. He comes down to take a shower in the basement where he has sex with an unknown Malagasy girl. Returning from the shower to his room, he discovers his three older friends (Yura Holitsyn, Arnold Horobets and Boris Roitman) who talk him into going to a disreputable bar with them. At the bar (bar-na-Fonvizina), the four friends consume a large quantity of low-quality beer. Otto pronounces a speech that calls for Ukraine's separation from Russia, to everyone's applause.

Soon Otto departs because he has an appointment with his colleague Kyryl at Kyryl's apartment. But before seeing Kyryl he has to buy presents for his friends' children at the big superstore "Dytiachyi Svit". On the way to the store Otto decides to visit his girlfriend Halya, a snake tamer. At Halya's he consumes some vodka, has sex with her, and, after getting into fight with her, narrowly escapes, leaving his cloak and audio-cassette with Mike Oldfield's music behind.

He stops by at a cheap and dirty restaurant and narrowly escapes unhurt as it explodes. At "Dytiachyi Svit" he visits a man's room where he walks past a middle-aged man of Southern or possibly Roma origin whom he at first takes for a homosexual and nicknames "the baron". Soon afterwards he discovers that his wallet has disappeared from his backpack and realizes that only the baron could possibly steal it. The wallet contains some money, but, most importantly, a plane ticket to Kyiv which was very hard to obtain. Otto pursues the baron who has just disappeared behind one of the doors that leads to the storage rooms of "Dytiachyi Svit". The wild chase through a maze of basement corridors ends in a brief encounter between the two. The baron is victorious as Otto groans on the floor with an injured leg. The triumphant baron, however, falls through an open sewer hatch by oversight, thus leaving Otto alone in the basement. Otto realizes that the store must be closed by now and all the doors leading to the top must be locked. After some attempts he stumbles across a door that opens but when he steps inside he finds himself inside a tunnel of the Moscow subway.

He is soon arrested by armed rat-catchers who promptly deliver him to the hands of KGB, still underground. Otto, himself formerly recruited by KGB, is locked in a cage but is unexpectedly presented to Halya who, as he learns, is another KGB spy. She helps him to get out, and after fooling security guards Otto enters a large hall where a banquet is taking place. This is a celebration of KGB and perhaps some other clandestine governmental organizations. He runs into his old acquaintance, the poet Yezhevikin who also seems to be a KGB agent. Some drinking ensues, and Yezhevikin procures a couple of prostitutes for himself and Otto. But the latter, under the influence of the mix of the alcoholic drinks consumed in the course of the day, is unable to contain himself and rushes to a bathroom where he throws up. In the bathroom he meets an old man who, after some admonition, assists Otto to attend a symposium of the dead. To get there, Otto must wear a mask and he chooses the mask of a clown. Once inside, he sees a number of masked figures who represent the powerful leaders from the Russian history – Ivan the Terrible, Lenin, Dzerzhinsky etc. A terrible plot is brewing. A mysterious figure in a black pantyhose pulled over its head announces a plan to amass the power of the Empire at the expense of subjugating other countries (Finland, France, Israel etc.) and turning its citizens into docile slaves. Otto faces a choice – either to sit back and let the plan go ahead, or to do something to defuse it. He borrows a gun from a KGB agent who is demoted as a consequence of Otto's escape, and shoots the Russian leaders, one by one. They tumble down as sacks stuffed with straw. Then Otto shoots himself.

But later he reappears alive and boards a train to Kyiv as Moscow is destroyed in a giant flood.

== See also ==
- List of Ukrainian-language poets
- List of Ukrainian-language writers
- Ukrainian literature
