= Plach Yeremiyi =

Ukrainian rock band

- Origin: Lviv, Ukraine
- Genres: Rock, progressive rock
- Years active: since 1990
- Members: Taras Chubay; Vsevolod Diachyshyn; Yurko Duda; Andriy Nadolskyy
- Past members: Oleksandr Kamianetskyi

Plach Yeremiyi (Ukrainian: Плач Єремії) is a Ukrainian rock band from Lviv, Ukraine. The band was actually formed in February 1990, but the two most constant musicians – Taras Chubay and Vsevolod Dyachyshyn have played together since 1984 in the band Tsyklon (Циклон).

== History ==
The band's first official performance was in February-March 1990 in the theatre-studio of "Don't Be Sad" during a series of concerts supporting the candidacy of Ukrainian politician Viacheslav Chornovil. As Chubay later recalled, during this time they played without drums and with a cello and were more of a quiet acoustic group. They eventually transitioned into a rock band with drums on 9 May 1990, and they performed their first major gig at the "Vyvykhv" festival in Lviv at the end of May 1990. A year later they performed at the Chervona Ruta festival, which was held in Zaporizhzhia that year. In the genre of rock music, they received second place from the jury at the festival. In 1993, they released their first studio album with 10 songs entitiled "The doors, which indeed exist" which were written to the lyrics of the poems of poet Hryhoriy Chubay (the father of the lead singer Taras).

For their album, Leave it all as it is (released in 1995), in 1996 they were awarded the "Golden Firebird" award from the Tavrian Games held in Kakhovka. In 2000, in a joint album release with Skryabin entitled "Our Partisans", the band recorded Ukrainian Insurgent Army (UPA) repertoire and most notably the folk Lemko song "A Duckling Swims in the Tisza" which would later become widely known during Euromaidan. Their last new album for many years was released in 2003, and in 2005 they rereleased Light and Confession. Chubay stated in 2010 that the band was preparing for a new album, and said that it was taking such a long time between releases because of the spread of piracy of music, as the band did not profit much from releasing any new albums due to this and did not have any motivation to release new music.

== Musical style ==
Plach Yeremiyi songs are usually serious, philosophical poems, many of which were composed by lead vocalist Taras Chubay's father Hryhoriy Chubay and given a contemporary rock sound. The group's name comes from Taras Chubay's father's Magnum opus Plach Yeremiyi posthumously published in 1999. Among other authors whose texts were used in the band's songs are Yurii Andrukhovych, Kostiantyn Moskalets, Volodymyr Ivasiuk. The music in the songs sounds hard, then changes to an easy ballad and again explodes, overfilled by emotions. All this has a specific "Lviv" colouring.

== Accolades ==
- Chervona Ruta-1991 (Zaporizhzhia): 3rd place among rock performers.
- Best Ukrainian concept rock band of 1993.
- Tavriyski Ihry-1996 (Kakhovka): best rock band of Ukraine (Golden Firebird prize).

== Albums ==
- Dveri kоtri naspravdi ye... (Двері, котрі насправді є, The doors, which indeed exist) (1993)
- Nay bude vse yak ye (Най буде все як є..., Leave it all as it is) (1995)
- Khata moya (Хата моя, My house) (1997)
- Dobre (Добре, It's good) (1998)
- Ya pidu v daleki hory (Я піду в далекі гори, I will go to the distant hills) (1999)
- Nashi partyzany (Наші партизани, Our partisans) (1999)
- Yak ya spala na seni (Як я спала на сені, As I slept on hay) (2000)
- Nash Ivasiuk (Наш Івасюк, Our Ivasiuk) (2002)

=== Compilations ===
- Rock legends of Ukraine (Рок-легенди України)

=== Taras Chubay with friends ===
- Nashe rizdvo (Наше різдво, Our Christmas)
- Nashi partyzany (Наші партизани, Our partisans)
- Nash Ivasyuk (Наш Івасюк, Our Ivasyuk) (2003)

=== Taras Chubay ===
- Svitlo i spovid'. (Світло і Сповідь, Light and Confession) (2003)
