= Bu-Ba-Bu =

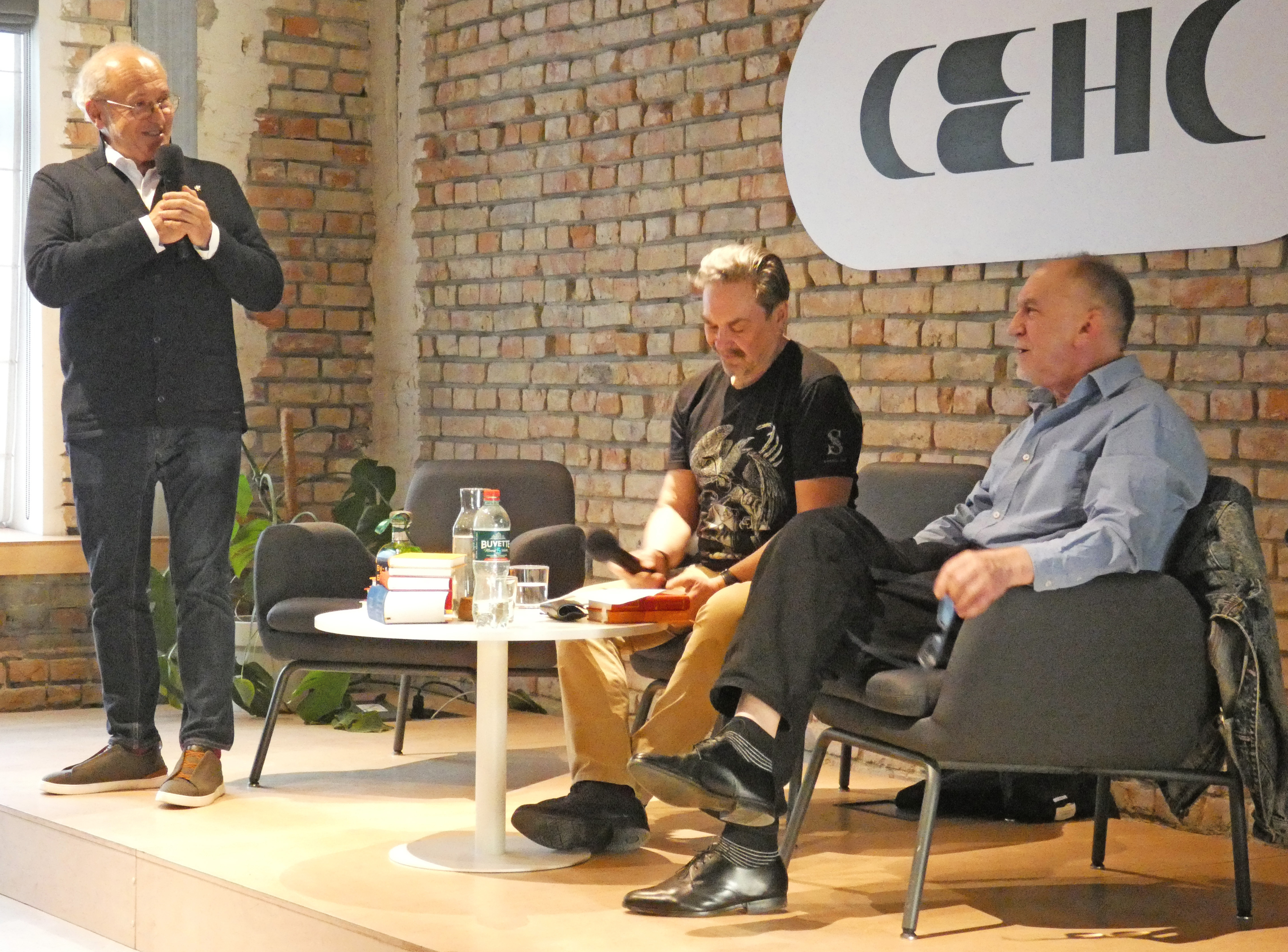
Anniversary evening on the occasion of the 40th anniversary of Boo-Ba-Boo. From left to right: Ivan Malkovych, Yuri Andrukhovych, and Oleksandr Irvanets. Photographed in 2025, Kyiv

Bu-Ba-Bu (Ukrainian: Бу-Ба-Бу) is a literary performance group founded on April 17, 1985 in Lviv by three Ukrainian writers Yurii Andrukhovych, Viktor Neborak, and Oleksandr Irvanets. The group's three syllables stand for "burlesque, balagan, and buffoonade". The idea behind the group's formation was in order to present a carnival like interpretation of events in Ukraine.

The first public evening of Bu-Ba-Bu took place in late 1987 in Kyiv. The period of the most active activity of Bu-Ba-Bu (23 concert poetry evenings) was 1987–1991.

The apotheosis of Bu-Ba-Bu was the Vyvykh-92 festival in 1992 (youth festival of alternative culture and non-traditional genres of art in Lviv). The brightest part of the festival were four performances of 1–4 October 1992, poetry opera Chrysler Imperial by Bu-Ba-Bu (directed by S. Proskurnia).

In 1995, the first joint book of bubabists Bu-Ba-Bu. T.v.o.[…]ry was printed in the publishing house "Kamenyar".

In 1996, the Chrysler Imperial (Thursday-6) print project effectively ended the "dynamic period" of Bu-Ba-Bu's existence.

The literary grouping became the embodiment of carnival neo-Baroque thinking inherent in the metahistorical carnival culture of humanity. The social foundation of the metahistorical carnival in Ukraine was the subconscious massive fracture syndrome that accompanied the collapse of the empire and caused two metapsychic components: social depression and massive carnival laughing reflection on the cataclysm of the system. The work of Bu-Ba-Bu members within the literary group itself became a situational and conceptual artistic response to social reflection. Bu-Ba-Bu founded its own Academy.

The theater, which the summer group "Bu-Ba-Bu" tried to create, was based on the shocking destruction of the norms of traditional poetry. This was realized by the development of taboo poetic themes, the use of profanity, stylistic smashing. Readers' reactions ranged from categorical rejection to enthusiastic commentary, but neither the group's supporters nor their enemies noticed that they were involved in a kind of game and that they were not playing - they were being played.

== The new literary tradition ==
A separate branch of literature and literary tradition, in the old style we might call it Ho-Hei-Go - Hoffmann, Heine and Gogol" - this is how George Shevelov defines Bubab The role of the group is - the most outstanding - carnival-like expression of Ukrainian postmodernism. The Bu-Ba-Bu group emerged in 1985, marking the cultural tension between Lviv and Kyiv. The group's authors live in In Lviv and Kyiv, from Ivano-Frankivsk, Rivne and Lviv; they arranged "poetic friendly gatherings" in various "enclosed spaces", as one of their wry As written - apartment, workshop and attic; its first public performance took place at the Kyiv Youth Theater on December 22, 1987. Members of the group - Yurii Andrujovich, Viktor Neborak and Alexander Il Vaniecs - the name is called "burlesque slapstick comedy" ("Balahan"). As is the case with contemporary Ukrainian literature, the Buffoonery will be "a radical way of overcoming depression, an antidepressant" (Neborak). The group grew out of the three writers' friendship and youth ("it was a mutual love and understanding"); that is, it was a bohemian phenomenon, but above all, it was a game-changer. "Simply put, we turned games into poetry," Irvanets wrote.

== Literary Performance: Concepts and Characters ==
Bu-Ba-Bus' distinctive approach to the interplay between literature and performance stems from the artistic vision the group has formulated for itself, and can be disclosed through an analysis of the performative aspects that pervade the work of its three members. Since its inception in 1985, Bu-Ba-Bu's shared aim has been to instill the spirit of carnival in Ukrainian literature, challenge the boundaries of literature, and reconfigure the role of Ukrainian writers. Besides adopting a literary persona (playing with the notion of subjectivity) in their poetry, Andrukhovych, Irvanets, and Neborak boldly experimented with the Ukrainian language, deconstructing and reconstructing it. Rabelais' Tragicomic Literary Festival and Mykhailo Bakhtin's interpretation of them inspired Bu-Ba-Bu, two authors who became mentors to young Ukrainian writers who sought to transform the conventional image of Ukrainian literature in society.

== Bu-Ba-Bu Academy ==
Bu-Ba-Bu Academy unites Bu-Ba-Bu members and poets awarded theBu-Ba-Bu Award for "Best Poem of the Year":

- Ivan Malkovych (1988)
- Nazar Gonchar (1989)
- Vihta Sad (1990)
- Volodymyr Tsybulko (1991)
- Mykhailo Barbara (1992)
- Olena Buyevich (1993)
- Petro Midyanka (1994)
- Mykola Kholodny (1995)
- Halyna Petrosanyak (1996)
- Yurko Pozayak (1997)
- Serhiy Zhadan (1999)

== See also ==
- Stanislav phenomenon
