= Mykola Riabchuk =

Ukrainian journalist, poet and writer

- Микола Рябчук
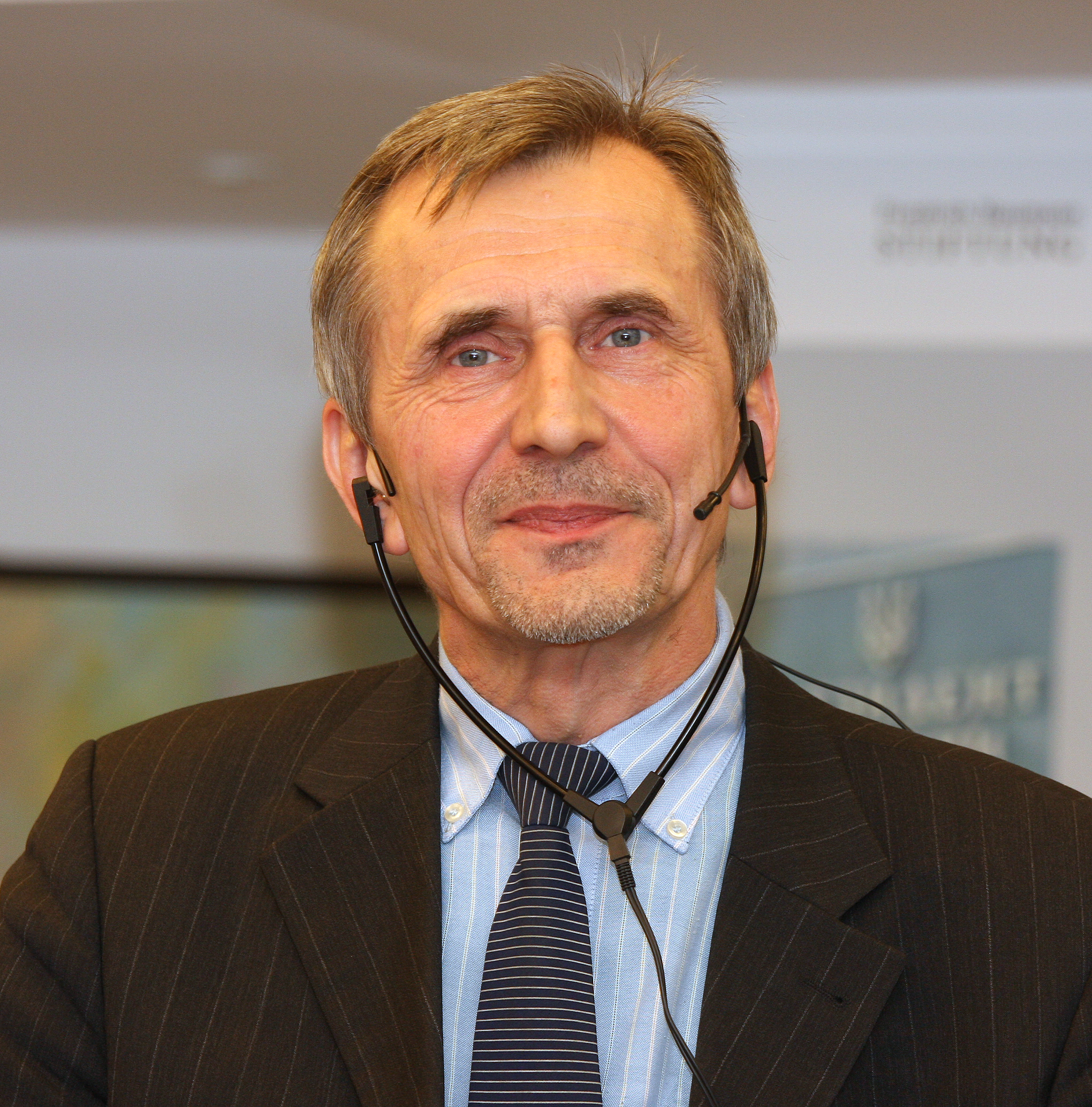
- Riabchuk in 2009
- Born: September 27, 1953 (age 73); Lutsk, Ukrainian SSR, Soviet Union (now Ukraine)
- Occupations: Public intellectual, journalist, political analyst, literary critic, translator, writer
- Spouse: Natalka Bilotserkivets (poet)
- Awards: Shevchenko National Prize

Mykola Riabchuk (Ukrainian: Рябчук Микола Юрійович; born September 27, 1953) is a Ukrainian public intellectual, journalist, political analyst, literary critic, translator and writer. Riabchuk is known for his analytical articles and essays on Ukrainian politics, national identity and analysis of Ukrainian history from postcolonial perspective. Married to Ukrainian poet Natalka Bilotserkivets.

== Biography ==
Riabchuk was born in Lutsk in western Ukraine. He studied engineering at Lviv Polytechnic. He was a member of the literary group around Hryhoriy Chubay with whom he authored the samizdat literary almanach "Skrynya", for which he was expelled from the university. Consequently, he took different jobs including working for the railway, theater electrician, etc. In 1988 Riabchuk graduated from Maxim Gorky Literature Institute in Moscow. From 1985 till 1994 Riabchuk worked as an editor of the "Vsesvit" journal dedicated to translations of literature from foreign languages. In the 1990s Riabchuk was the editor of Suchasnist magazine, which published new Ukrainian literature, he is responsible for bringing several now famous Ukrainian writers to the broad audience. Riabchuk was one of the founders of the Krytyka magazine. Since 1997 he is a member of the Association of Ukrainian Writers. Writes a weekly column for "Gazeta po-ukrayinsky". Riabchuk is currently a research fellow at the Ukrainian Center for Cultural Studies in Kyiv. In 2005 he received a Candidate Degree in Political Science at the Institute for Political and Ethnic Studies National Academy of Sciences of Ukraine.

== Awards ==
- POLCUL Award, 1998
- Polish-Ukrainian Capitula Award in 2002 for his contribution to Polish-Ukrainian reconciliation.
- Book of the Year Award, 2000 and 2003
- Antonovych prize in 2003 for outstanding achievements in the humanities

== Books ==
- Winter in Lviv (collection of poems)
- Ukraine on Its Meandering Path Between East and West (Interdisciplinary Studies on Central and Eastern Europe) by Andrej N. Lushnycky (Editor), Mykola Riabchuk (Editor) (2009)
- Mykoła Riabczuk Od Małorosji do Ukrainy ISBN 83-242-0098-3 (2003)
- Od Malorusije do Ukrajine. - Beograd: Svetozar Markovic, 2003
- Mykoła Riabczuk Dwie Ukrainy ISBN 83-89185-07-5 (2004)
- Mykoła Riabczuk Ogród Metternicha Wrocław: Kolegium Europy Wschodniej, 2010
- Riabchuk De La Petite Russie a L'Ukraine ISBN 2747551342 (2003)
- Mykola Rjabtschuk Die reale und die imaginierte Ukraine ISBN 978-3-518-12418-5 (2005)
- Mykola Riabchuk Gleichschaltung. Authoritarian Consolidation in Ukraine 2010–2012 (ENG) ISBN 978-617-684-001-5 (2012)
