= Larysa Bilozir =

Ukrainian politician

- Лариса Білозір
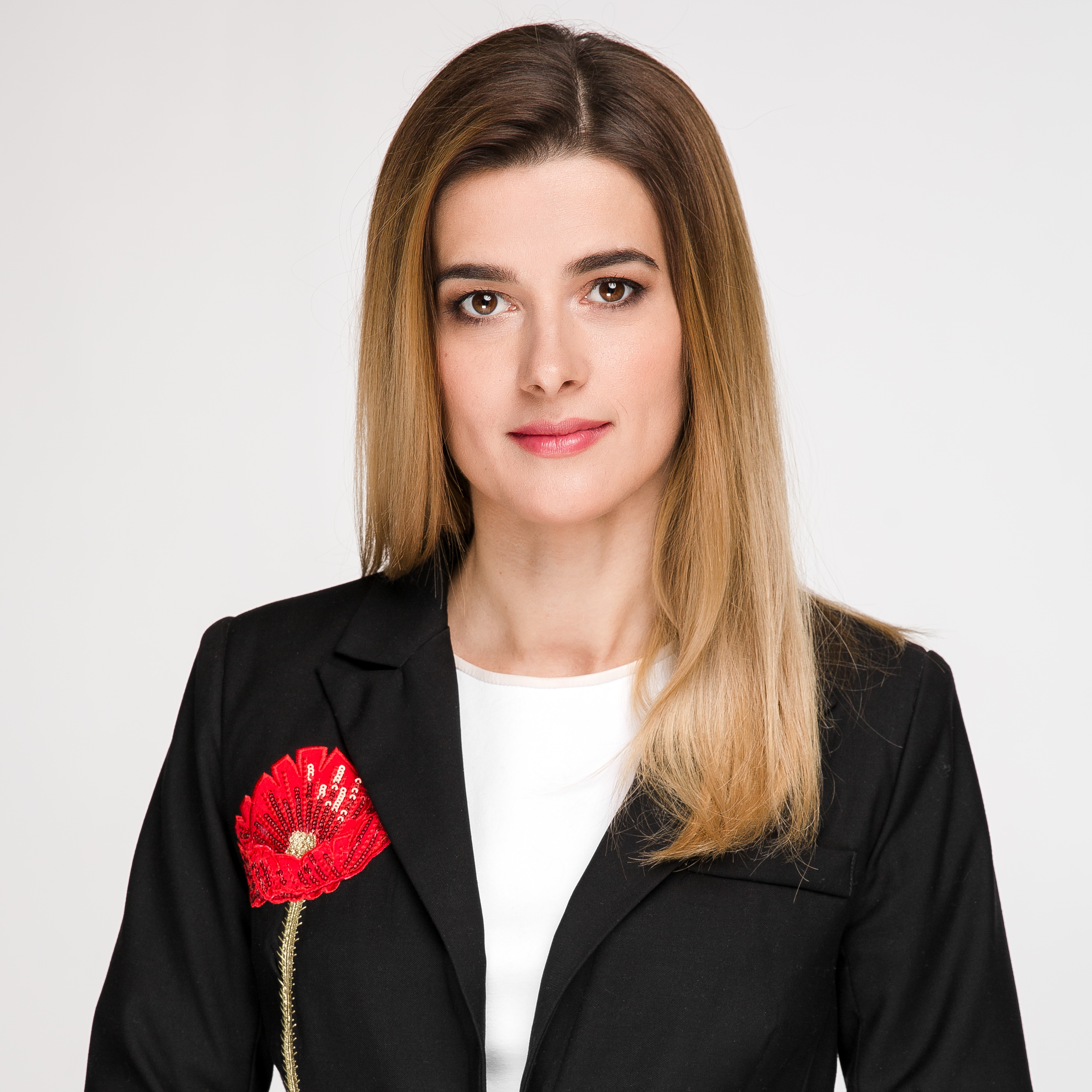
- Bilozir in 2018

People's Deputy of Ukraine
- Incumbent
- Assumed office 29 August 2019
- Preceded by: Ivan Sporysh
- Constituency: Vinnytsia Oblast, No. 15

Personal details
- Born: Larysa Mykolayivna Kucher; 24 June 1981 (age 45) Trostianets, Ukrainian SSR, Soviet Union (now Ukraine)
- Party: Independent
- Other political affiliations: Dovira; Petro Poroshenko Bloc
- Education: Taras Shevchenko National University of Kyiv

Larysa Mykolayivna Bilozir (Ukrainian: Лариса Миколаївна Білозір; née Kucher; born 24 September 1981) is a Ukrainian politician currently serving as a People's Deputy of Ukraine representing Ukraine's 15th electoral district as an independent member of Dovira since 2019.

== Biography ==
Larysa Mykolayivna Kucher was born on 24 September 1981, in the family of agronomist Mykola Kucher and a librarian in the village of Trostianets, Vinnytsia Oblast, where she spent her childhood and went to school.

After graduating from school, she entered the Institute of International Relations of the Taras Shevchenko National University of Kyiv, where she received a degree in economics and, over time, the degree of Candidate of Economic Sciences. After that, she continued her studies at the International Institute of Management in Brussels and received a master's degree in business administration.

Since 2004, Bilozir has worked in the structures of the agro-industrial complex, private business, and the social sphere.

== Political career ==
In 2015, she was elected a deputy of the Vinnytsia Regional Council from the Petro Poroshenko Bloc party, and was the head of the Charitable Foundation for Aid to Children with Cancer. Heads the public organization "Life and Development of Communities".

In 2019, Bilozir was elected a People's Deputy of Ukraine in Ukraine's 15th electoral district (Murovanokurilovetsky, Tomashpilsky, Tulchynsky, Chernivtsi, Shargorod districts) as a self-nominated candidate. At the time of the election: Executive Director of the NGO "Life and Development of Communities", non-partisan. Lives in Kyiv.

== Family ==
Bilozir's father is Mykola Kucher, a Ukrainian politician and former Soviet party functionary currently serving as a People's Deputy of Ukraine. Her husband is Andriy Bilozir, the son of composer Ihor Bilozor and singer Oksana Bilozir. She has two daughters.
