= Oleksandr Irvanets =

Ukrainian writer, playwright and poet

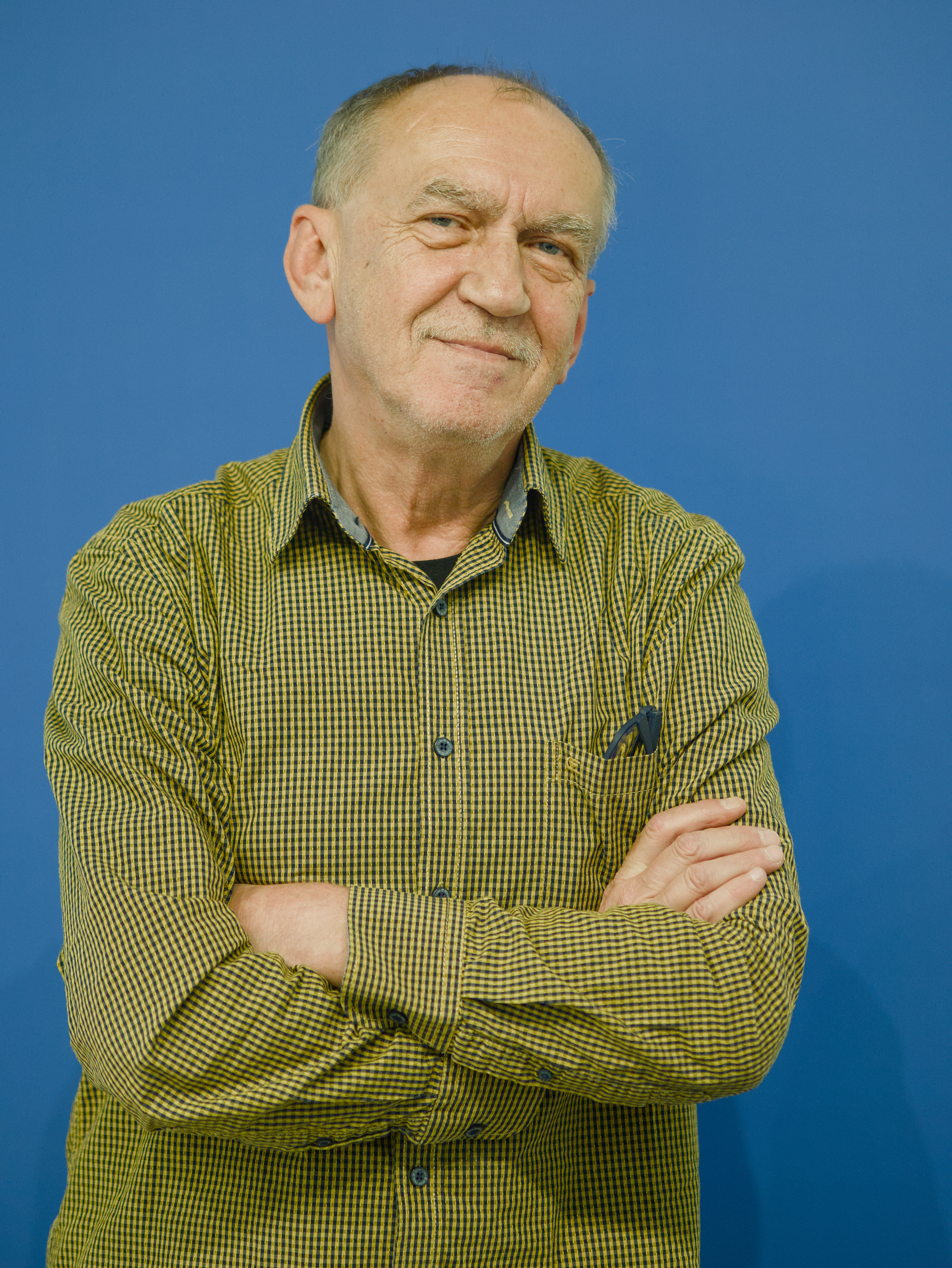
Oleksandr Irvanets at the Frankfurt Book Fair 2025

Oleksandr Vasyliovych Irvanets (Ukrainian: Олександр Васильович Ірванець; born 24 January 1961) is a Ukrainian poet, writer, playwright, and translator.

== Biography ==
Born in Lviv, Irvanets spent his childhood in Rivne, where he attended school. In 1980 he graduated from Dubno pedagogical institute. In 1985 together with Yurii Andrukhovych and Vasyl Neborak Irvanets formed the literary group Bu-Ba-Bu, whose member he remains to this day. In 1989 he finished studies at the Maxim Gorky Literature Institute in Moscow. Since 1993 Irvanets has resided in Irpin.

His works have been translated into numerous languages, including English, German, French, Swedish, Polish, Czech, Belarusian, Russian, Italian and Croatian. Since the early 2000s Irvanets has dedicated himself to drama and prose. He is the author of more than 20 books, as well as numerous publications in American and European journals.

== Bibliography ==
- Fire in the Rain (Lviv, 1986)
- Shadow of the Great Classic (Kyiv, 1991)
- Verse of the Last Decade (Lviv, 2001)
- Rivne/Rovno (Wall) (Lviv, 2002; Kyiv, 2006; Kharkiv, 2010)
- Five Plays (Kyiv, 2002)
- Ochamymria (Kyiv, 2003)
- Love!.. (Kyiv, 2004)
- Nutcracker-2004 (Kyiv, 2005)
- Preambles and texts: a collection of poems (Kyiv, 2005)
- Libenkraft's Disease (Kharkiv, 2010)
- My Cross (Kharkiv, 2010, Graffiti series with postscriptum by Serhiy Zhadan)
- Satiricon-XXI (Kharkiv, 2011)
- Fifth Feather. Selected essays (Lutsk, 2011)
- Songs of War: verse of the last years (Kyiv, 2014)
- Kharkiv 1938 (Kyiv, 2017)
