= Halyna Petrosanyak =

Ukrainian poet and translator

- Галина Іванівна Петросаняк
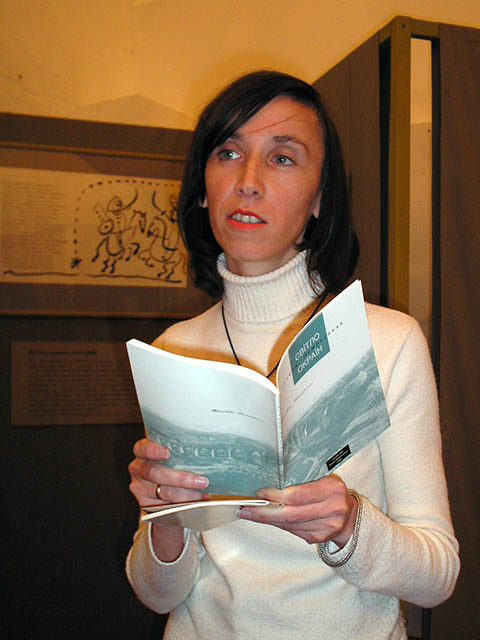
- Halyna Petrosanyak in 2005
- Born: 1969 (age 56–57)
- Education: Vasyl Stefanyk Precarpathian National University
- Occupations: writer, translator

Halyna Petrosanyak (Ukrainian: Галина Іванівна Петросаняк; born 1969) is a Ukrainian poet, writer, and translator.

== Life ==
Halyna Petrosanyak was born in 1969 in a remote village in the Ukrainian Carpathians. She graduated in German and Russian studies from Vasyl Stefanyk Precarpathian National University.

Petrosanyak was among the authors linked to the group known as the Stanislav phenomenon. She debuted in 1996 with her poetry book Парк на схилі ("Park on the hill"). A poem from the publication was awarded with the Bu-Ba-Bu "Best Poem of the Year" award. Petrosanyak is also the laureate of Hubert-Burda-Preis für junge Lyrik (2007) and the Ivan Franko Prize (2010). Her works have appeared in various literary magazines and almanacs and have been translated into several languages, including English, German, Polish, Russian, Czech and Italian.

Petrosanyak works as a translator from Czech and German into Ukrainian. She has translated, among others, the autobiographies of Alexander Granach and Soma Morgenstern.

In 2021, the author's first novel "Villa Anemona" was published in Ukrainian. Also in 2021, the Ukrainian translation of the novel "Next Year in Jerusalem" by Andrè Kaminski was published.

In 2022, the essay collection, "Our Neighbour Albert Hoffmann" was published in Ukrainian. Furthermore, the Ukrainian translation of the Sonnets to Orpheus by Rainer Maria Rilke was published in the same year. Also, the poetry collection "Exophonies" was published in 2022 with a foreword by Ruth Schweikert. In the same year, the author attained membership in the Bavarian Academy of Fine Arts and was awarded the Literature Prize of the Kunststiftung NRW-Straelen.

== Publications ==
=== Poetry ===
- Парк на схилі (“Park on the hill”), 1996
- Світло окраїн (“Light of outskirts”), 2000
- Спокуса говорити, 2008
- Екзофонія (“Exophonium”), 2019
- Exophonien. Im Rhythmus der Landschaft ("Exophonies. In the Rhythm of the Landscape"), 2022

=== Other ===
- Політ на повітряній кулі, 2015 – essays and poetry
- Не заважай мені рятувати світ (“Don’t hinder me to save the world”), 2019 – short stories
