= Akim Apachev =

Russian artist and propagandist

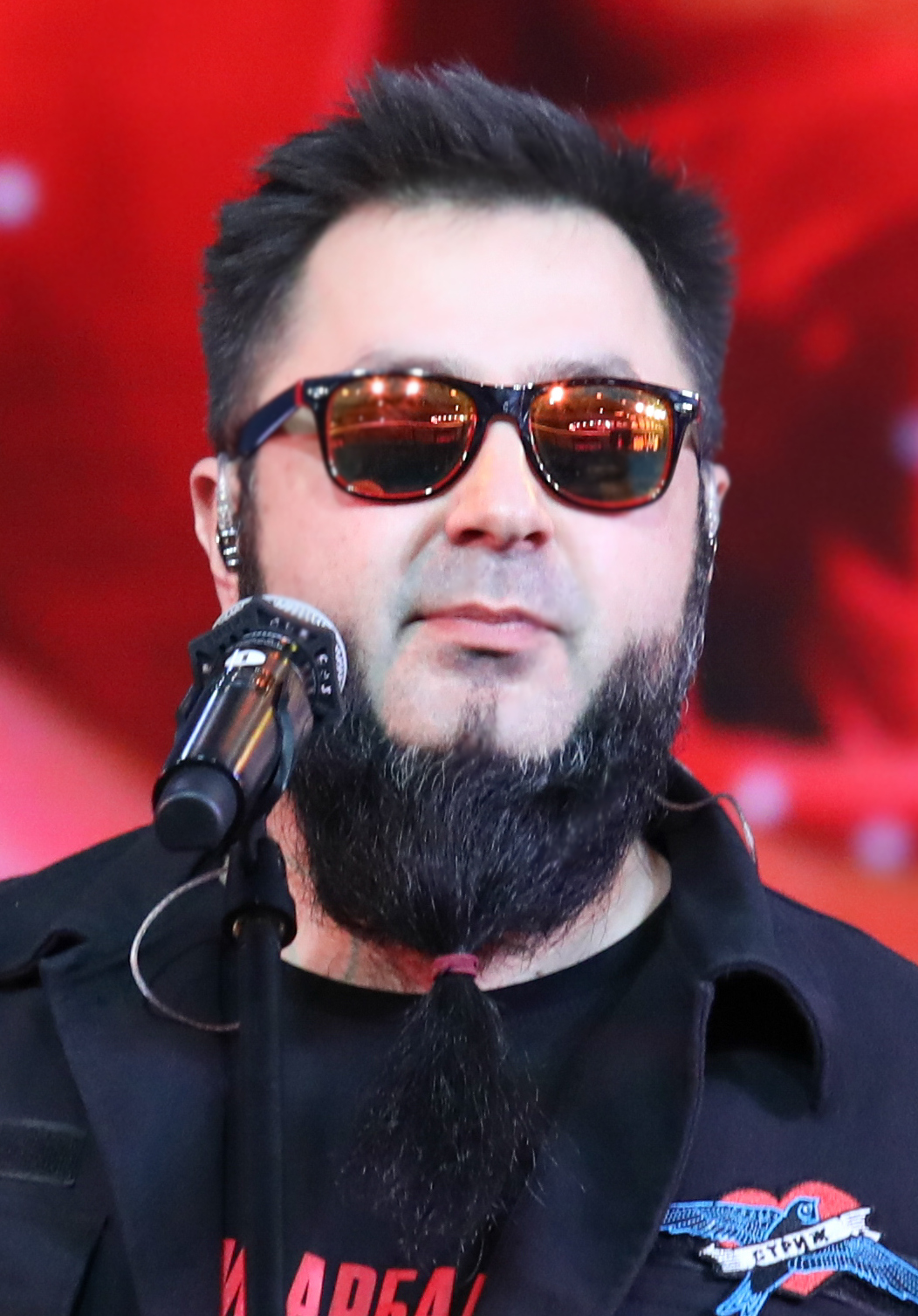
- Akim Apachev at a concert in 2024
- Born: Akim Vladimirovich Gasanov; April 4, 1985 (age 41); Mariupol, Ukrainian SSR
- Citizenship: Russian
- Occupations: Russian rapper, and journalist
- Notable work: Лето и Арбалеты; ХМЕЙМИМ; Армата
- Website: https://vk.com/akimapachev

Akim Apachev (Russian: Аким Апачев; April 4, 1985) is a pro-Russian rap artist and propagandist. He gained global popularity after the release of his song "Лето и Арбалеты" (Summer and Crossbows), a song about the Wagner Group and its activities in Ukraine, Libya, and Syria.

== Early life ==
Akim Apachev was born Akim Vladimirovich Gasanov on April 4, 1985, in Zhdanov (now Mariupol), Ukrainian SSR. His father was an Azerbaijani immigrant named Volodymyr Gasanov.

After graduating from the Secondary School of Zhdanov, Akim Apachev served with the Ukrainian Army for a short time.

== Personal life ==
Akim Apachev does not advertise whether or not he has a wife or children. Very little is known about Apachev's personal life outside of what he posts on VKontakte.

A 2023 article from The Moscow Times stated that Apachev was friends with Igor Mangushev, a Russian mercenary and political strategist who was executed by unknown soldiers in February 2023. However, deceased Russian warblogger Andrey Morozov on Telegram claimed that Mangushev was executed by PMC Wagner mercenaries. Quoted in an article from Ukrainska Pravda, Apachev said "He [Mangushev] died. Yesterday I visited Igor together with his wife Tatiana in the hospital."

Apachev is also believed to be close with the pro-Russian philosopher Aleksandr Dugin.

In April 2023, Russian news agency TASS reported that Akim Apachev attended the funeral of Russian military blogger Vladlen Tatarsky after his assassination in 2023. The article states that Apachev was a "close personal friend" of Tatarsky.

Apachev is a baptized adherent of the Russian Orthodox Church. He revealed this in a 2023 interview, stating "For me, the theme of Orthodoxy is near, I am baptized, Orthodox..."

== Career ==
Akim Gasonov changed his stage name to Akim Apachev in the early 2010s. The name is likely a reference to the American AH-64 Apache attack helicopter and his call sign, as his Instagram username is Akim_Apache, and it fits with his military persona.

Beginning in 2014, Akim Apachev served with the 5th Brigade "Oplot" of the Russian Orthodox Army in Eastern Ukraine.

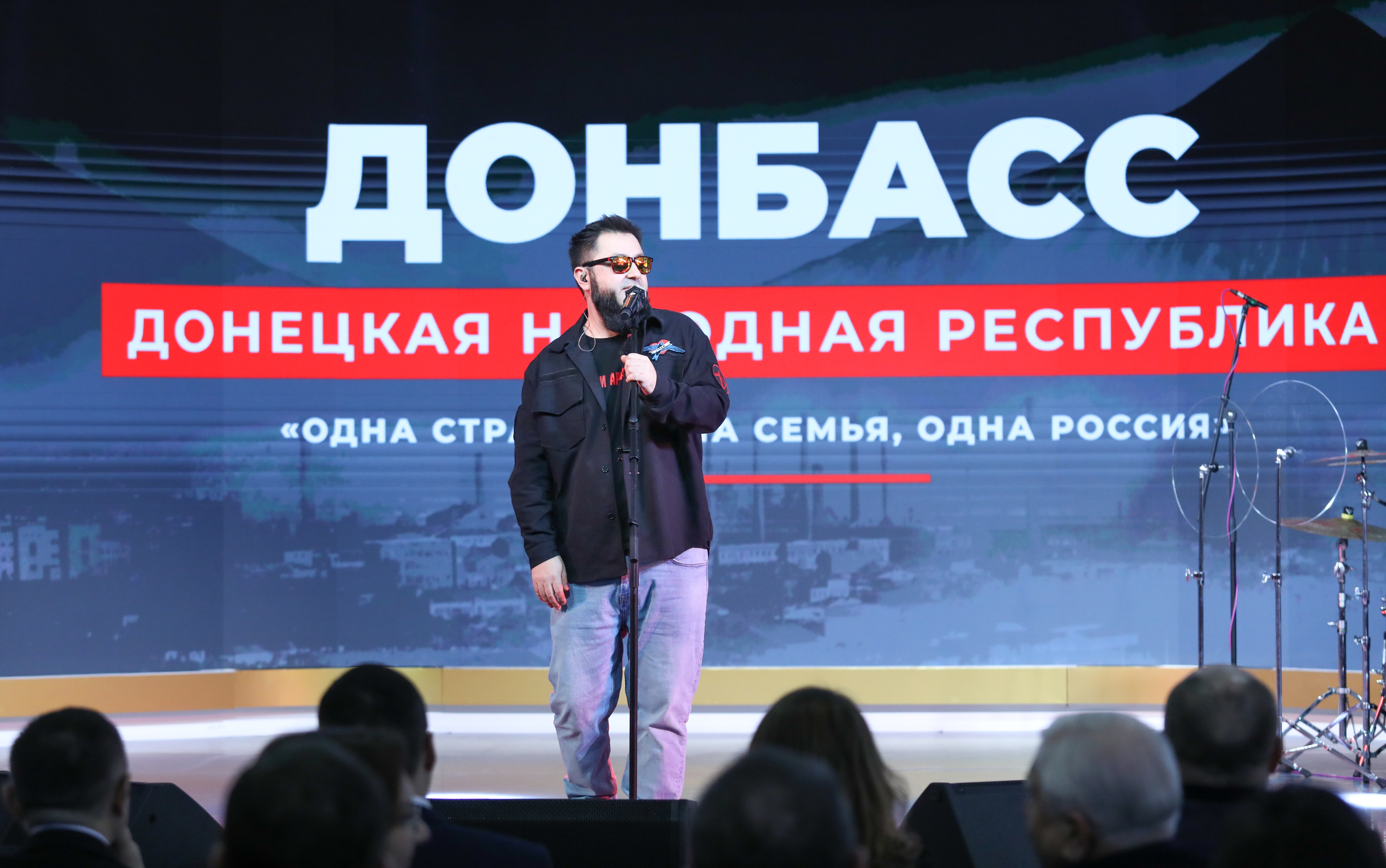
Akim Apachev speaking at an event in 2024.

Apachev's career began in Ukraine as a cameraman and director of short clips and music videos for local up-and-coming musical artists. He moved to Donetsk and co-founded the TV station Novorossiya TV, working as the chief director there for a short time before moving to Moscow.

In 2014, after the Russian annexation of Crimea, Apachev was ANNA's military correspondent for the Russian intervention in Syria and the War in Donbas for a short time.

In May 2022, shortly after the end of the Siege of Mariupol, Akim Apachev, along with fellow Russian singer Daria Frey, sang "A Duckling Swims in the Tisza" inside the ruins of the Azovstal Iron and Steel Works in Mariupol, Ukraine. The video was released by Russian TV channel RT.

In 2023, Akim Apachev founded the Russian military music radio station "Arbalet FM," which operates out of Donetsk, Ukraine.

Throughout Russia's 2022 invasion of Ukraine, Apachev, along with other Russian artists, has visited the front lines to entertain Russian troops.

== Political activity ==
In a 2022 interview with the Russian state media website Ukraina.ru, Akim Apachev repeated common anti-Ukrainian conspiracy theories, telling interviewers "I think that we must first get away from ourselves inside, at home, at home, in our workplace... on our street, and then move on to this more important clash - ideological - with the new Ukrainian terrorist state."

In April 2023, Apachev wrote a letter to the Russian Ministry of Culture in order to prevent a concert performance by Kazakh rapper Jah Khalib. He accused Khalib, who had been a vocal supporter of Ukraine, of trying to "support the terrorist Ukrainian army, but also finance the Armed Forces of Ukraine." As a result, Jah Khalib's performance in Moscow was canceled, and he was barred from performing in Russia indefinitely.

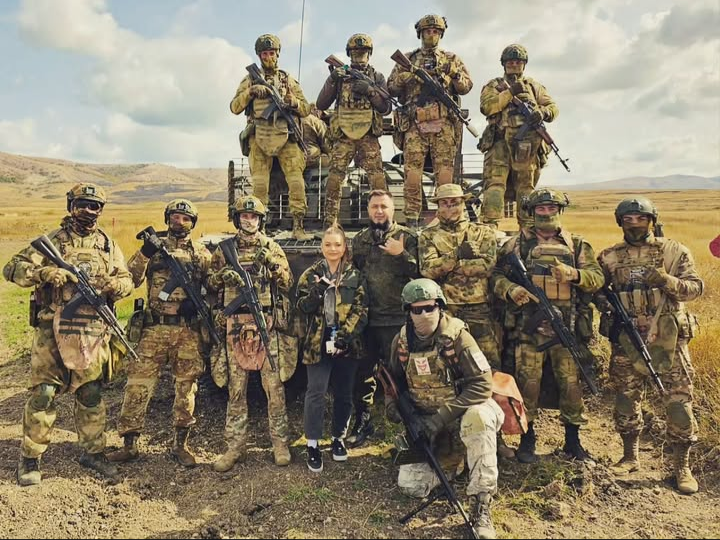
Akim Apachev (bottom, center) posing with Russian soldiers in Ukraine, posted to his Instagram account in 2023.

In a 2023 interview with Anton Krasovsky, Apachev said "We must kill all those who carry Ukrainian idea," and advocated for the extermination of 10% of the Ukrainian population. In a separate interview, he referred to Ukraine as a country of "heretics, [and] non-Christians."

Akim Apachev has repeatedly expressed contradictory views on issues relating to Ukraine and Donbas. During a 2024 interview with Russian journalist Ksenia Sobchak, Apachev said, referencing his childhood as a Russian speaker in Ukraine, that "There were never any language problems. I spoke both Ukrainian and Russian perfectly. ... There was never anything," while discussing the supposed persecution of Russian speakers in Ukraine. In response, Sobchak told him "You do realize that the main thesis of Russian propaganda is that 'we are going to liberate them because they ban the Russian language'. You are now refuting this thesis." Apachev responded to this by stating "After 2014, of course, they began to squeeze out the Russian language. But before that, in the East, we did not have this. The east has always been Russian."

In March 2025, Akim Apachev faced widespread criticism in Russia after spray painting anti-Ukrainian slogans on buildings in Sudzha. Apachev visited Sudzha for a propaganda stunt shortly after Ukrainian forces withdrew from the town. He graffitied anti-Ukrainian slogans such as "Khokhols suck dick." This move was heavily criticized by residents of Sudzha, resulting in a Russian court ordering Apachev to pay 70,000 rubles in fines.

== Music use in psychological operations ==
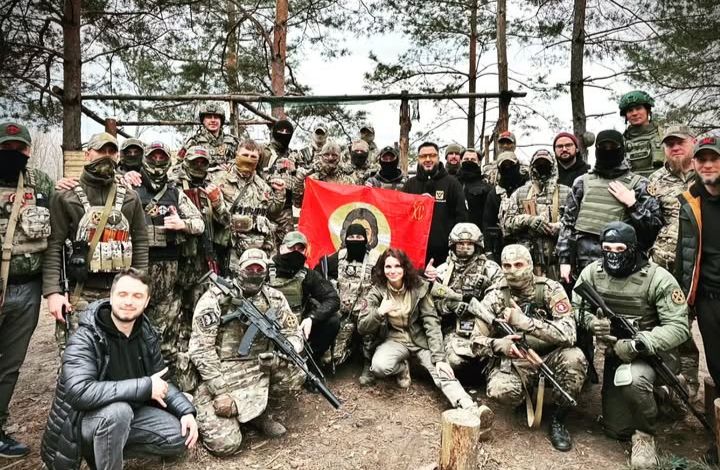
Akim Apachev (holding flag, right) posing with members of the Russian 141st Special Motorized Regiment in a 2023 Instagram post.

During the 2022 Siege of Mariupol, there were unconfirmed reports of Russian soldiers, specifically Wagner mercenaries, using vehicle-mounted speakers to play Akim Apachev's song "Лето и Арбалеты" in the direction of Ukrainian positions.

This was most likely a psychological warfare strategy, meant to demoralize besieged Ukrainian troops as well as deny them sleep.

== Controversy and content removal ==
In late 2022, in the wake of the initial Russian invasion of Ukraine, Akim Apachev's YouTube and TikTok accounts were disabled as part of a wave of pro-Russian account deletions and suspensions by the two platforms. The deletions only occurred after Google and ByteDance were contacted by reporters from The Sunday Times, who identified several accounts and videos that violated both platforms' terms of service.

According to a YouTube spokesperson, Akim Apachev's music videos could be classified as "content intended to praise, promote, or aid violent extremist or criminal organisations..." because they often advocated the donation of money and weapons to the Wagner Group, along with glorifying the group's actions and encouraging recruitment.

== Discography ==
=== Albums ===
- Говорит Донбасс - released in 2021
  1. Говорит Донбасс (Рингтон 1)
  2. Беседа с Татарским 1
  3. Браза Донбасс
  4. Говорит Донбасс (Рингтон 2)
  5. Беседа с Татарским 2
  6. Витя Проффесор
  7. Говорит Донбасс (Рингтон 3)
  8. Беседа с Татарским 3
  9. Лето и арбалеты (Тик Ток)
- Гуляйполе - released in 2023
  1. Джамбо
  2. Русский хулиган
  3. Окопный дэнс
  4. Лето и арбалеты
  5. Естественный отбор
- Полковник Свет - released in 2024
  1. Братья по оружию
  2. Праздник
  3. На Западном фронте без перемен
  4. Моя Россия
  5. Аэропорт
  6. Крысы
  7. Покажи мне мир
  8. Полковник Свет
  9. Кто-то нажал на кнопку
  10. Тьма
  11. Акт Победы
  12. Когда закончится война
- Всех убить! Все отнять! - released in 2024
  1. Слушай
  2. Русский Терминатор
  3. Раз, два, три
  4. ФАБы и арбалеты
  5. Дарденейра
  6. Мама, я контужен
  7. Всех убить! Все отнять!
- Русский мир - released in 2025
  1. Нет ума-штурмуй дома!
  2. Нога
  3. Каждому Огнеборцу
  4. Пульгасари
  5. Бобры
  6. Барс
  7. Русский мир
- Регинлейв - released in 2025
  1. Поднимите мне веки
  2. Регинлейв
  3. Последний лепесток
  4. Под ракитою зелёной
  5. Кони привередливые
  6. В голову
  7. Маяки Русского мира
  8. Кайр

=== Singles ===
- Последний лепесток
- Нацики и комуняки
- Снежинки
- Бобры
- Волга 149.200
- Жди меня
- Ой чий то кiнь стоiть
- Спят курганы темные
- Но сначала
- У Райских врат
- Солдат
- Они ушли
- Мы
- Уходим на войну(as a feature)
- Лепестки
- Из Донецка с любовью
- Украина - ДНР
- Башар Асад
- Бородатый Триполи
- ХМЕЙМИМ
- Армата
- Не ходи за мной
- Урожай
- Перед взлётом
