= Oksana Bilozir =

Ukrainian singer and politician

- Оксана Білозір
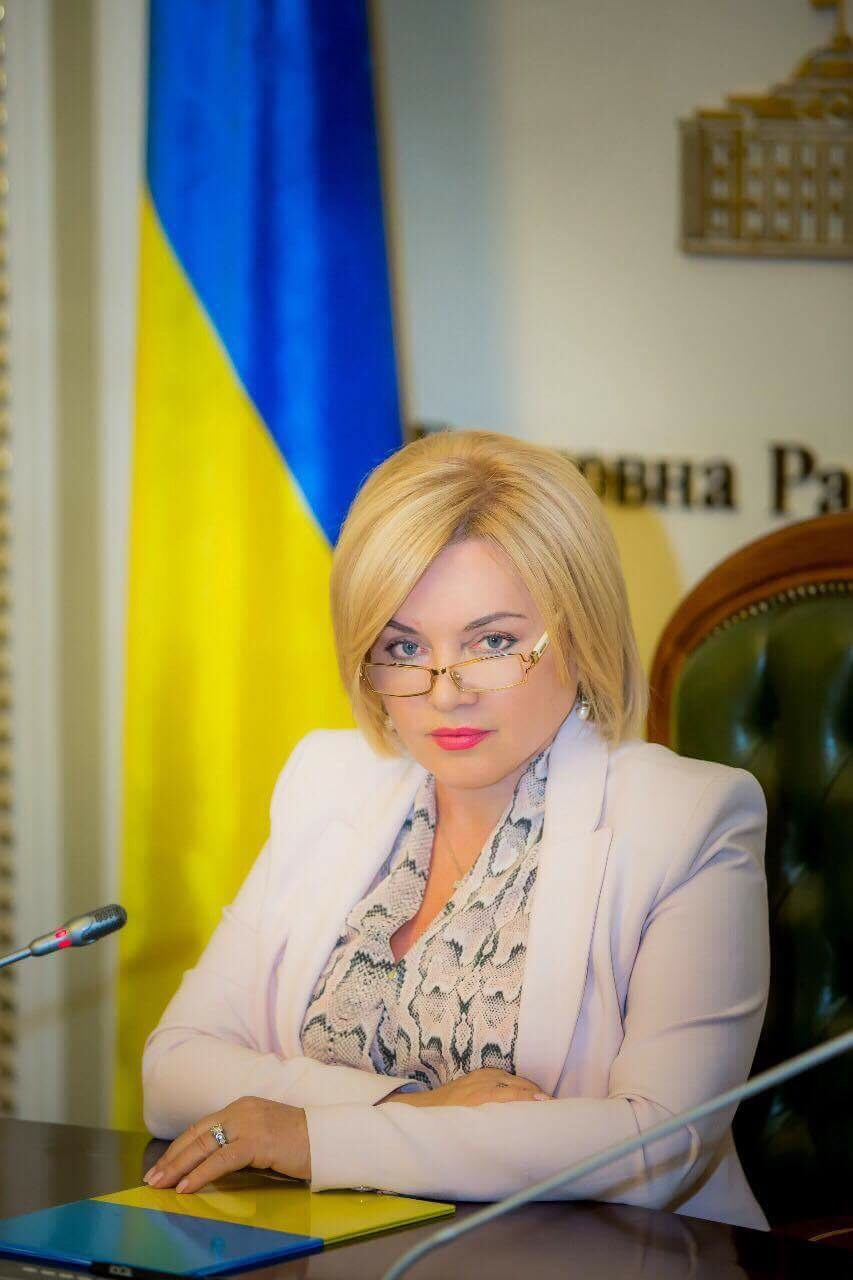
- Bilozir in 2017
- Born: Oksana Rozumkevych; 30 May 1957 (age 69); Smyha, Dubno Raion, Rivne Oblast, Ukrainian SSR, Soviet Union
- Occupations: Singer; politician
- Political party: Our Ukraine
- Spouses: Ihor Bilozir; Roman Nedzelsky
- Children: 2

Oksana Volodymyrivna Bilozir (Ukrainian: Оксана Володимирівна Білозір, née Rozumkevych, Ukrainian: Розумкевич; born 30 May 1957) is a Ukrainian singer and politician, and People's Artist of Ukraine (1994), who served as a People's Deputy of Ukraine and, from February to September 2005, the Minister of Culture and Tourism of Ukraine.

== Biography ==
Oksana Bilozir was born on 30 May 1957 in Smyha settlement, Dubno Raion, Rivne Oblast, Ukrainian SSR (now Ukraine).

=== Education ===
- 1976 – Lviv Musical-Pedagogical College named after F. Kolessi.
- 1981 – Lviv State Conservatory named after M. Lysenka.
- 1999 – Diplomatic Academy of Ukraine, affiliated with MFA of Ukraine, with qualification of Master of foreign policy and diplomacy.

=== Family ===
- Father: Volodymyr Rozumkevych (born 1930), retired.
- Mother: Nina Vasylivna (1933–2004).
- 1st spouse, Ihor Bilozir (1955–2000), Ukrainian famous composer and singer, the frontman of VIA "Vatra", was tragically murdered in May 2000, in Lviv.
- 2nd spouse, Roman Nedzelsky, is the Director of the state enterprise "Ukraina Gastrol'na" (eng. – Touring Ukraine) under Ministry of Culture of Ukraine.
- Sons: Andriy Bilozir, a former member of the Kyiv city council, wife of whom was elected to parliament in the 2019 Ukrainian parliamentary election, and Yaroslav Nedzelsky.
- Daughter-in-law is a politician Larysa Bilozir; her father is a fellow politician Mykola Kucher.

Oksana Bilozir is close to the family of former Ukrainian President Yushchenko. She is as well the godmother of one of the daughters of Petro Poroshenko.

== Artistic achievements ==
Oksana Bilozir started her concert activity in 1979, as soloist of VIA "Vatra", founded by her first husband. Since 1994 she has been the lead singer of music band "Oksana". She released 15 albums, a DVD, and 10 music films.

== Teaching activities ==
1996 – Professor, Pop Singing Department at Kyiv National University of Culture and Arts, Head of Department, professor of the Kyiv State School of variety and circus arts. In 1996–1997 Oksana Bilozir was teaching at Kyiv State Institute of Culture.

== Politics ==
Oksana Bilozir became the People's Deputy of Ukraine three times, twice from the bloc Our Ukraine (in 2002–2005 and in 2006), and from the bloc Our Ukraine – People's Self-Defense during early parliamentary elections in 2007. In 2004–2005 she led the Social Christian Party (in October 2008 that party merged with United Centre), later became a member of the party Our Ukraine, with the President Viktor Yushchenko acting as the Honorary chairman. In February 2008 Bilozir and several prominent members left Our Ukraine; she became a member of United Centre. Bilozir voted for the dismissal of the second Tymoshenko Government in February 2009. In September 2010 she became a member of Christian Democratic Union. Bilozir took part in the 2012 Ukrainian parliamentary election as an independent candidate in single-member districts number 66 (first-past-the-post wins a parliament seat) located in the town Malyn; with a third place (with 12.13% of the votes) in the district she was not (re-)elected in parliament. In the 2014 Ukrainian parliamentary election Bilozir was a candidate of Petro Poroshenko Bloc; placed 80th on the electoral list. But the party won only 63 seats on the electoral list; hence she was not (re-)elected into parliament.

== See also ==
- 2007 Ukrainian parliamentary election
- List of Ukrainian Parliament Members 2007
- Verkhovna Rada
