= Yuriy Izdryk =

Ukrainian journalist and poet (born 1962)

- Юрій Романович Іздрик
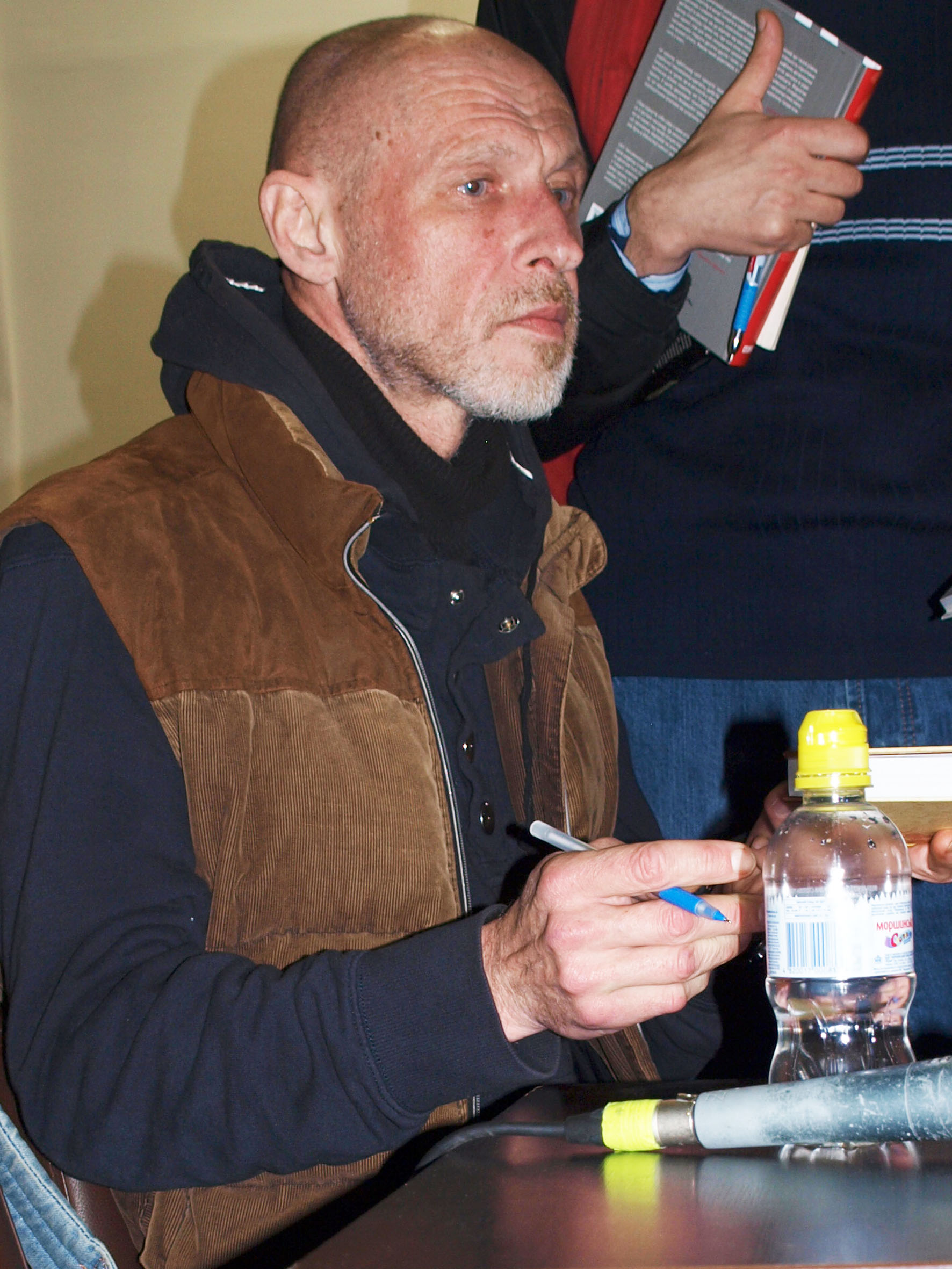
- Born: Yuriy Romanovych Izdryk; 16 August 1962 (age 64); Kalush, Ukrainian SSR, Soviet Union
- Education: Lviv Polytechnic National University
- Occupations: Writer; poet
- Writing career
- Language: Ukrainian
- Movement: Postmodernism

Yuriy Romanovych Izdryk (Ukrainian: Юрій Романович Іздрик; born 16 August 1962) is a Ukrainian writer, poet, actor, and the creator of the conceptual magazine project Chetver (Thursday). He is the author of the novels Wozzeck & Woczkurgia (1996, 1997), Double Leon (2000) and AM™ (2004), as well as the poetry collection Stanislav and his 11 Liberators (1996), several essay and short story collections (including The Island of Krk and Other Stories, 1993), plus cultural and literary criticism articles. A co-founder of the Stanislav phenomenon, a group of postmodernist post-Soviet writers, Izdryk is also a visual artist, music composer, and theater practitioner. He lives and works in his birthplace, Kalush, Ukraine.

== Biography ==
=== Early life and education ===
Izdryk's father, Roman Andriiovych, spent his youth in the village of Gremyachinsk of the Perm region. He and five of his brothers and sisters were deported there with their mother while their father, Father Andrii Izdryk, was imprisoned in Stalinist concentration camps.

Izdryk excelled in school, especially in mathematics, and played in a school music ensemble. Around the same time, his interests in literature began, reading Vsevolod Nestayko, Stepan Rudansky, Aleksandr Kuprin, and the Great Soviet Encyclopedia. At age 14, he wrote his first poem in Russian.

Izdryk graduated from music school in cello and piano, and also played guitar and mandolin. After graduation, he entered the Lviv Polytechnic Institute's Faculty of Mechanics and Technology, where he studied art history, played in rock bands, and participated in productions of an amateur student theatre.

=== Early career ===
After graduating in 1984, Izdryk began working as an engineer at a machinery plant in Ivano-Frankivsk. In 1986, he transferred to the Kalush Research Institute of the Khalkaria and worked there until 1990.

At the end of the 1980s, he participated in numerous official and unofficial artistic events and exhibitions and collaborated with the Komsomol oblast newspaper.

In 1989, he began work on the magazine Chetver. The first two editions were self-published. In 1990, at one of the artistic events (during the preparation of the biennial "Impreza" that took place in Ivano-Frankivsk), Izdryk met with Yurii Andrukhovych, which became a decisive factor in his life. He asked Andrukhovych to edit Chetver with him, and for several years the two artists worked on the magazine together.

=== Artistic establishment ===
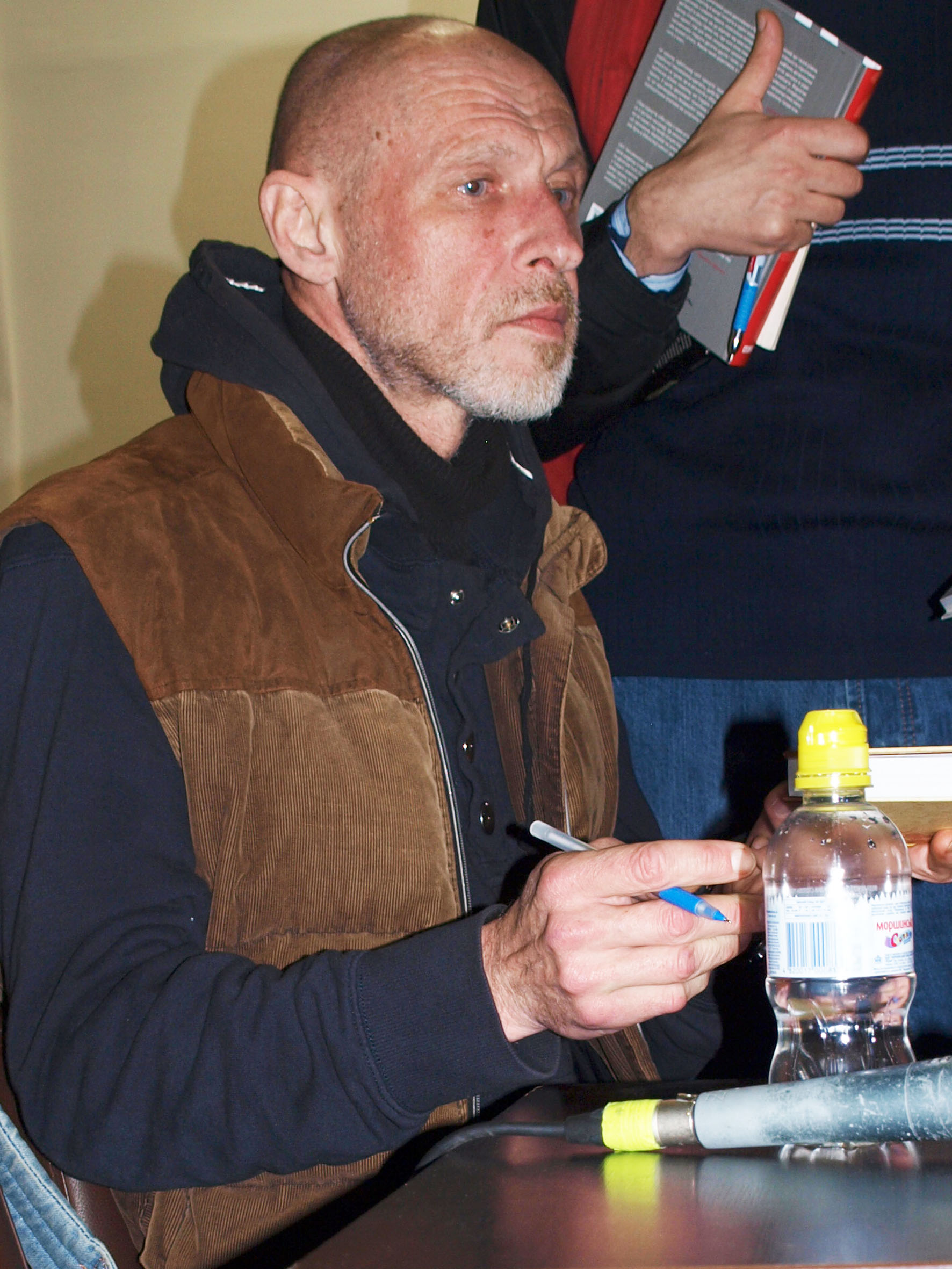
Yurko Izdryk on the Book Arsenal. Kyiv, 2016

Izdryk's first works appeared in the self-published editions of the magazines Chetver and Breaking (Poland). These included the serial The Last War and the poetic cycle Ten poems about the Motherland. The style of these early works led some critics to believe that Izdryk was a pseudonym of Andrukhovych, as certain stories, characters and phrases are similar – which later came to distinguish the creators of the Stanislav phenomenon. Over time, Izdryk declared himself an extraordinary artist, and plagiarism was dismissed.

Visual art briefly interrupted Izdryk's writing. He began to actively engage in painting, and participated in exhibitions between 1990 and 1994. He also engaged the artistic design of books and magazines and conducted personal exhibitions. His drawings were popular and he was able to make a living from them. For a time he was fascinated by theatre and wrote staging for The Cricket on the Hearth and The Catcher in the Rye, which were used by the Chernihiv regional youth theatre in the early 1990s.

In 1994, Izdryk returned to literary endeavours. His short story "Island Krk" appeared in the mainstream magazine Modernity in 1994, and was received positively by critics. A Polish translation later appeared in the magazine Literatura na Świecie, and the story was featured in the 1993 collection The Island of Krk and Other Stories.

Izdryk published his first novel, Wozzeck, in 1997. He followed this with Double Leon in 2000 and AM™ in 2004. He continued to edit Chetver until its publication was suspended in 2008. In 2009, Izdryk published the collections of essays and sketches Flash 2GB and TAKE, for which he received a 2010 Book of the Year award from BBC-Ukraine. In 2011, Izdryk published Underwor(l)d, a collection of poetry and essays. In 2013, he published Izdryk. Yu a collection of poetry originally published in his blog, "Dead Diary".

Izdryk's focus returned to music. He had written music cycles on poems by Andriyovych and Anna Kirpan. He collaborated on joint musical projects with poet and musician Hryhorii Semenchuk.

In 2014, while attending the International Scholarship for Poets, Meridian Czernowitz in Chernivtsi, Izdryk began collaborating on the Summa media project, which involves the constant communication of the authors with the audience. The end product of Summa was to be a book of the same name.

In June 2018, he recorded a videoconference in support of the Ukrainian director in prison, Oleh Sentsov.

== Stanislav phenomenon ==
Izdryk is considered one of the primary representatives of the Stanislav phenomenon. According to Ukrainian literary scholars, the writers of the Stanislav phenomenon are the most representative branch of Ukrainian postmodern literature. In this form of postmodernism, authors try to answer the question of whether members of this group are really postmodernists, or if they are some type of modern avant-garde.

== Works ==
=== Prose ===
- The Island of Krk and Other Stories (1993)
- Wozzeck & Woczkurgia (1997)
- Double Leon (2000)
- "Another format: Yurko Izdryk" (Ivano-Frankivsk: Lilia-NW, 2003)
- AM™ (Lviv: Calvaria, 2004)
- "3:1" is "Krk Island", "Wozzeck" and "Double Leon" (Kharkiv: "Family Leisure Club", 2009)
- "TAKE" (Kharkiv: "Family Leisure Club", 2009).
- "Flash-2GB" (Grani-T, 2009. ISBN ISBN 978-966-465-222-0).
- "Flash. Defragmentation "(" Such ", 2009)
- "Nomination. All Prose of Izdryka "(Lviv:" The Publishing House of the Old Lion ", 2016)
- "Summa" (with Evgeniya Nesterovich; Chernivtsi: Meridian Czernowitz, 2016)

=== Poetry ===
- "Yu" (Lviv: "The Publishing House of the Old Lion", 2013)
- "After prose" (Chernivtsi: Meridian Czernowitz, 2013)
- "AB OUT" (Lviv: "Old Lion Publishing House", 2014)
- "Calendar of Love" (Lviv: "Old Lion Publishing House", 2015)
- "Papiorsi" (Chernivtsi: Meridian Czernowitz, 2017)
- "Sloth and tender" (K .: A-ba-ba-ha-la-ma-ha, 2018)
- "Smokes" [Dual-language edition: Ukrainian-English] (Sandpoint, Idaho: Lost Horse Press, 2019)

=== Essay ===
- "Flash stick" (2007)
- "Flash stick–2GB" (K.: Grani-T, 2009. ISBN ISBN 978-966-465-222-0)
- "Atthecitymiddle. Topology of deja vu" ("Flash stick–2GB". K.: Grani-T, 2009. 146-159. ISBN ISBN 978-966-465-222-0).
  You are not funnied by beardy anecdote about the Globe of Ukraine anymore? Me too. But simply because it's not an anecdote at all.
  — Yurko Izdryk, Atthecitymiddle. Topology of deja vu

=== Film ===
- Starring as Felix in Iryna Tsilyk's Rock Paper Grenade

== See also ==
- List of Ukrainian literature translated into English
- List of Ukrainian-language writers
