= Mykola Kucher =

Ukrainian politician and entrepreneur

- Микола Кучер
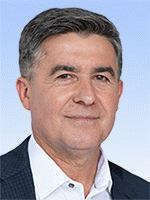
- Official portrait, 2019

People's Deputy of Ukraine
- Incumbent
- Assumed office 27 November 2014
- Preceded by: Hryhoriy Zabolotnyi
- Constituency: Vinnytsia Oblast, No. 17

Personal details
- Born: 24 July 1959 (age 66) Hordiyivka, Ukrainian SSR, Soviet Union (now Ukraine)
- Party: Independent
- Other political affiliations: Ukrainian People's Party (2005–2010); PPB (2014–2019); Dovira (since 2019)

Mykola Ivanovych Kucher (Ukrainian: Микола Іванович Кучер; born 24 August 1959) is a Ukrainian politician and entrepreneur. Since 26 November 2014, he has been serving as a People's Deputy of Ukraine.

== Education ==
In 1981, he graduated from the Ukrainian Agricultural Academy with a degree in agronomy.

== Career ==
- 1981 – the main agronomist of collective farm, Trostianchyk village, Trostianets Raion
- 1989–1992 – chair of Trostianets regional agro-industrial corporation
- 1992–1994 – director of agricultural and food management of Trostianets regional administration
- 1994–1995 – deputy manager of agriculture and food management of Vinnytsia Oblast government
- 1995–1999 – Head of Department managing Vinnytsia oblast administration
- 1999–2000 – Head of department deputy manager Ukraine's Bread (Kyiv)
- 2000–2002 – first deputy manager Bread of Ukraine
- 2002–2004 – chairman of the board of directors of Bread of Ukraine
- 2004–2013 – director of Grain Product MHP
- Since 2013 — Department director Mironivsky Hliboproduct

== Political career ==
- Since 2010 — Deputy of Vinnytsia Oblast Council (Ukrainian People's Party).

In the 2014 Ukrainian parliamentary election Kucher won electoral district No. 17 (Vinnytsia Oblast) as an independent candidate with 47.64%.

- 27 November 2014– — member of the Verkhovna Rada Committee on agriculture policy and land relations and member of faction of the Petro Poroshenko Bloc "Solidarity"

In the 2019 Ukrainian parliamentary election Kucher was re-elected in single-seat constituency 17 again as an independent candidate with 34.97% of the votes.

In December 2018, he sent a request–the court–take on bail the former acting Myroslav Prodan, head of the Fiscal Service of Ukraine (suspected of illegal enrichment of UAH 89 million in 2016–2018).

== Private life ==
He is married, with two children. In the 2019 Ukrainian parliamentary election Kucher's daughter Larysa Bilozir was elected in single-seat constituency 15.

== Recognition ==
- A Candidate of Agricultural Science (Ukraine)
- Honoured Agricultural Worker of Ukraine
- Order of Merit, 3rd Class (Ukraine)
