= Ihor Bilozir =

Ukrainian composer and musician (1955–2000)

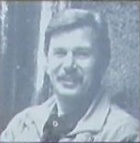

Background information
- Born: Ihor Yosypovych Bilozir; March 24, 1955; Radekhiv, Lviv Oblast, Ukrainian SSR, Soviet Union
- Origin: Ukrainian SSR → Ukraine
- Died: May 28, 2000 (aged 45) Lviv, Ukraine
- Occupations: Composer; Musician; Performer; People's Artist of Ukraine; Band leader

Ihor Yosypovych Bilozir (Ukrainian: Ігор Йосипович Білозір; March 24, 1955 – May 28, 2000) was a Ukrainian composer, musician, performer, People's Artist of Ukraine, and leader of the Vocal-Instrumental Ensemble "Vatra".

== Biography ==
Ihor Bilozir was born on March 24, 1955, in the town of Radekhiv, Lviv Oblast, Ukrainian SSR. He studied at Radekhiv Secondary School No. 1. His first musical compositions were performed by the school's vocal-instrumental ensemble, and his first professional recording took place in 1969 on Lviv Radio's program Wandering Meridian.

Later, he moved to Lviv, where he lived at 4 Fredra Street. A memorial plaque now hangs on the building, and his apartment has been converted into a museum dedicated to the composer. Bilozir studied at the Lviv Music and Pedagogical College and the Lviv Conservatory. He also trained in the United States and Canada.

From 1977, he was the leader of the vocal-instrumental ensemble "Rhythms of the Carpathians" at the Lviv Bus Factory. From 1979, he served as the artistic director and soloist of the Vatra ensemble under the Lviv Regional Philharmonic, which continues to perform many of his songs. Bilozir wrote songs for his wife, vocalist Oksana Bilozir, and performed some of his compositions himself.

On May 8, 2000, Bilozir was assaulted in the "Tsarska Kava" café on Shevchenko Avenue in Lviv. The attack occurred because his songs were deemed disruptive by a group of patrons, including Dmytro Voronov and Yurii Kalinin, who were singing and listening to Russian chanson. Due to the injuries sustained, he died on May 28, 2000, in a Lviv emergency hospital. He was buried at the Lychakiv Cemetery in Lviv (Field No. 2).

On August 7, 2002, the Lviv Oblast Appellate Court sentenced Dmytro Voronov, accused of Bilozir's murder, to 10 years in prison. Yurii Kalinin, charged as an accomplice, was sentenced to eight years. The court also ordered an internal investigation at the medical facility where Bilozir died.

== Creative work ==
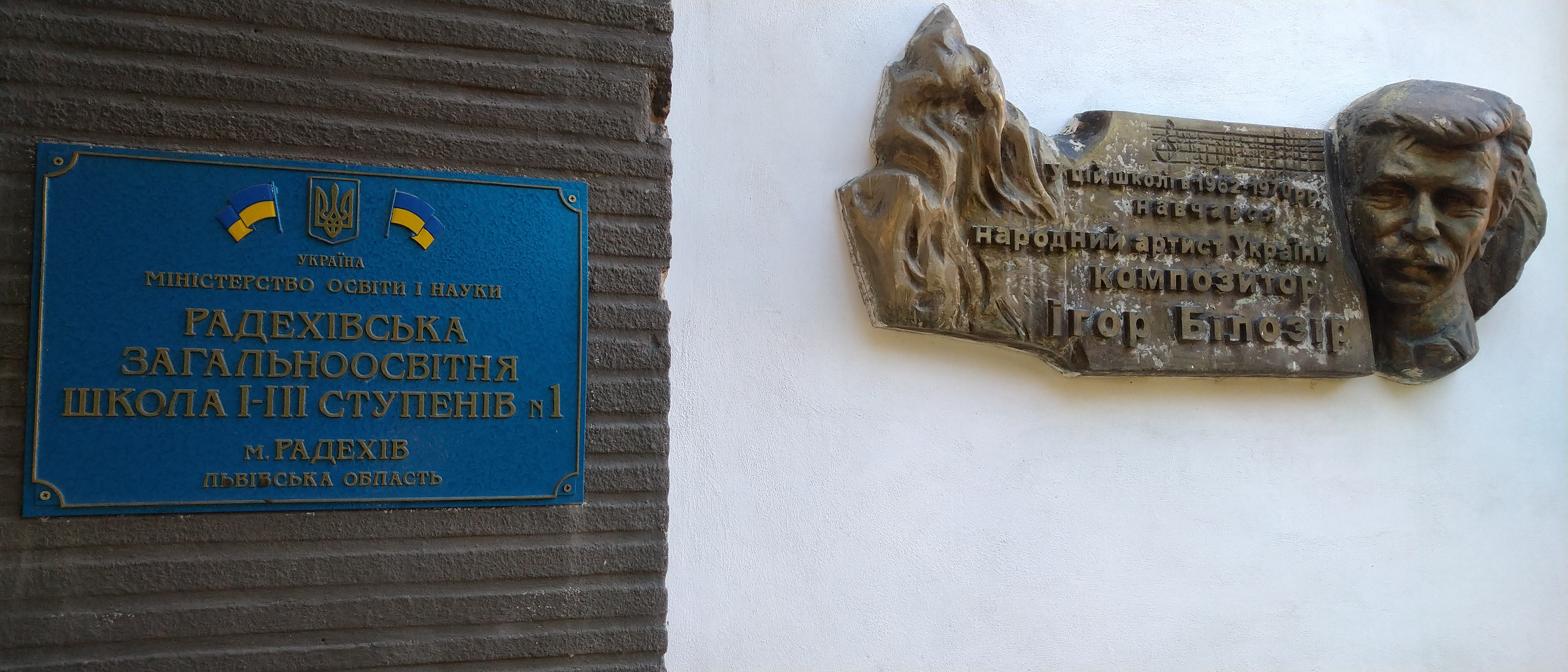
Memorial plaque to Ihor Bilozir in Radekhiv

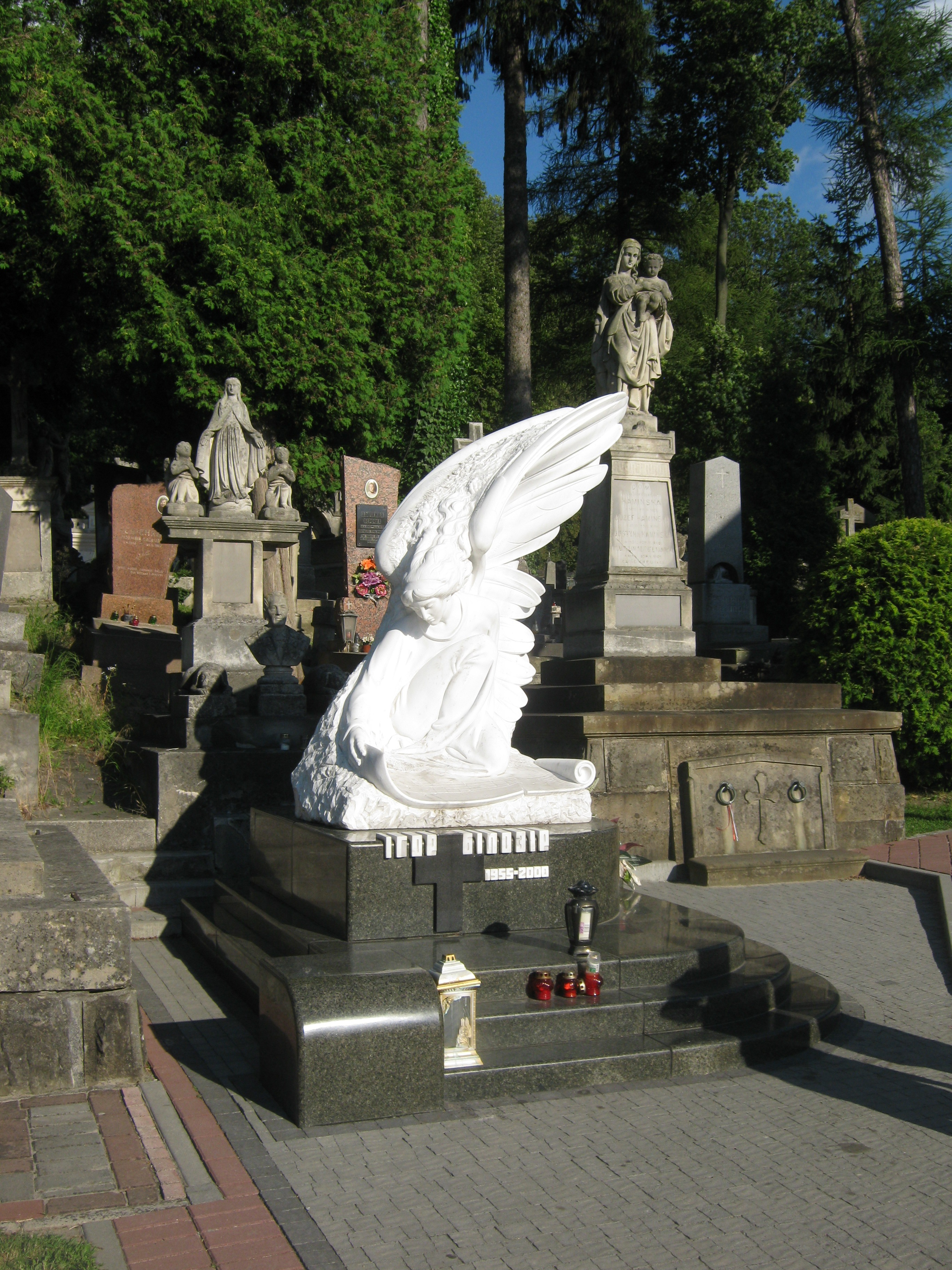
Monument to composer Ihor Bilozir at Lychakiv Cemetery, Lviv (2013)

Bilozir was a composer of pop songs, chamber-instrumental compositions, orchestral works, and music for theatrical productions. His notable songs include:

- "Wheat Sheaf", "Mother's Room" , "Wedding March" – lyrics by Bohdan Stelmakh;
- "As If Yesterday" , "Beloved" – lyrics by Petro Zapotichny;
- "Blue Snow" , "Knights" – lyrics by Anna Kanych.

His work gained recognition in the United States, Canada, Germany, Poland, and Russia. In 1996, he was awarded the title of People's Artist of Ukraine.

== Commemoration ==
- In Radekhiv, a street (formerly Zirkova) and the music school where Bilozir studied were named after him, making it the first such tribute in Ukraine. A bronze memorial plaque, created by sculptor Anatoliy Halyan, was installed on the school's façade.
- On August 19, 2013, a monument in the form of a white angel, crafted from Italian marble, was consecrated at Bilozir's grave in the Lychakiv Cemetery museum-reserve. The monument, created by sculptors Andriy and Volodymyr Sukhorsky and architect Kostiantyn Maliarchuk, took over one and a half years to complete. The ceremony was attended by relatives, friends, and over 500 Lviv residents. Oksana Bilozir spoke at the event, saying:

"August 19 is the feast of the Transfiguration of the Lord, and Ihor, his life, and his mission were one of suffering and devotion. It is like the transformation of an ordinary person into God's design, God's providence, and God's plan. His death also became a tremendous shock for many Ukrainians, prompting them to reflect on who they are and why they are here."

- On the same day, at 7:00 pm, a concert titled "Trace on the Earth," dedicated to Bilozir's memory, was held at the National Academic Ukrainian Drama Theatre named after Maria Zankovetska. The composer's songs were performed by Vatra, Vatrovi, Oksana Bilozir, Maryan Shunevych, Ihor Bohdan, the band "19th Class," Antonina Matviyenko, Oksana Hryb, Oleh Martsynkivsky, Oleh Yarema, Maria Hev, and others. Memories were shared by Fedir Stryhun, Bohdan Stelmakh, Petro Zapotichny, and others.
- On August 18, 2022, the Lviv City Council renamed Herzen Street in the Halytskyi District of Lviv to Ihor Bilozir Street.

== Sources ==
- Golden Fund of Ukrainian Pop Music (in Ukrainian)
