= Stanislav phenomenon =

Ukrainian avant-garde art group, 1989–1996

The Stanislav Phenomenon was an avant-garde art group which was active in the city of Stanislav (now Ivano-Frankvisk) between 1989 and 1996. It was a group of artists and writers living in Ivano-Frankivsk who were affiliated with the Western postmodernism after the collapse of the Soviet Union. The writers include Yuri Andrukhovych, Halyna Petrosanyak, Yuri Izdryk, Volodymyr Yeshkiliev, and Taras Prokhasko.
