= Victor Morozov =

Ukrainian singer-songwriter

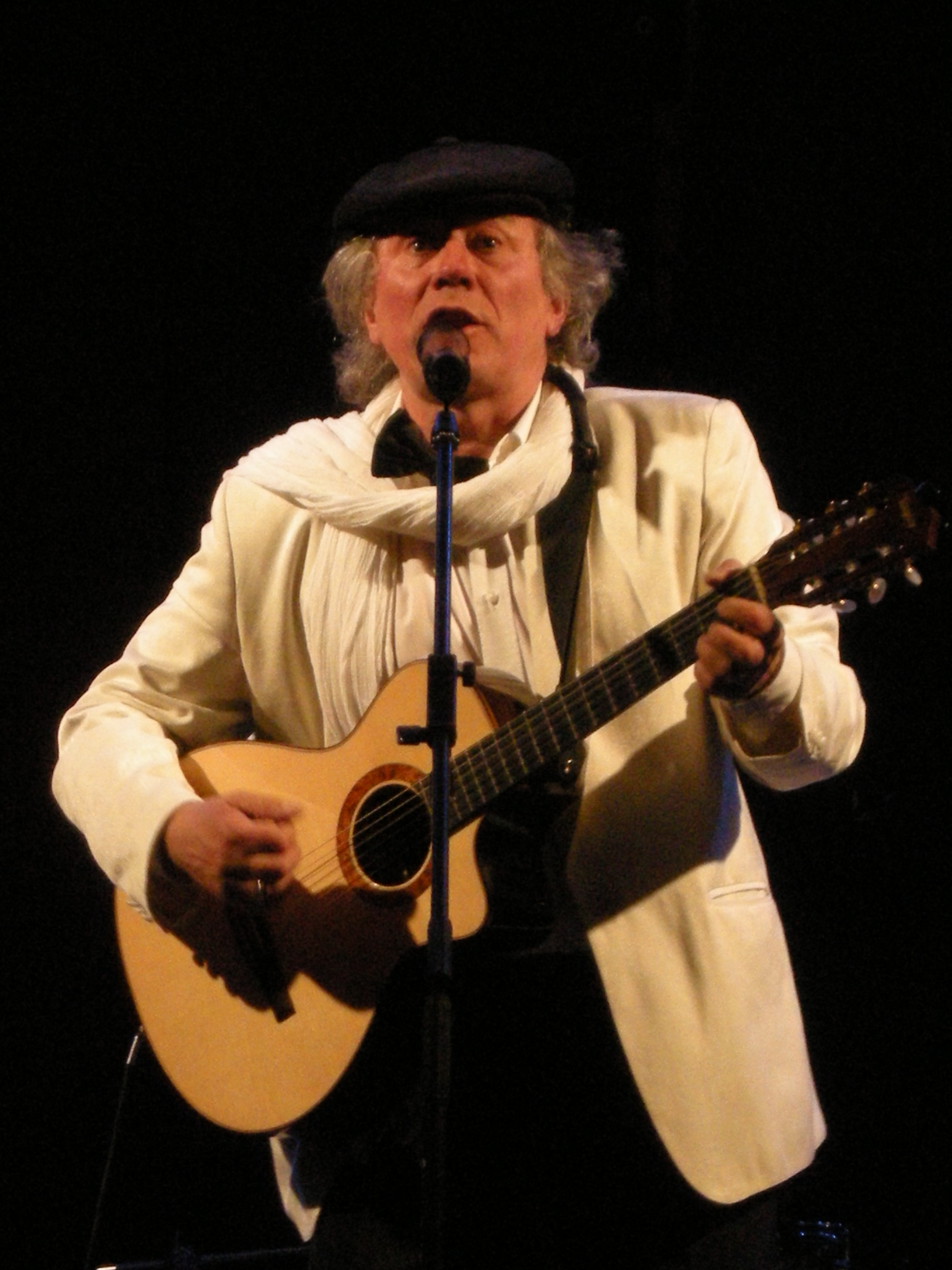
Victor Morozov in May 2010

Victor Yevhenovych Morozov (Ukrainian: Віктор Євгенович Морозов; born June 15, 1950) is one of Ukraine's most popular singer-songwriters.

== Musical career ==
Victor Morozov was born on June 15, 1950, in Kremenets, a city in western Ukraine. He began his musical career in the early seventies in Lviv, where he created two of the first Ukrainian rock groups – "Quo Vadis" in 1971 and "Arnika" in 1972. By 1976, Victor was hired as a soloist with the ensemble "Vatra" and in 1979 became a soloist with the popular group "Smerichka". This gave him the opportunity to work closely with other well-known musicians and composers, such as Ihor Bilozir, Oksana Bilozir, Vika, Nazariy Yaremchuk and Volodymyr Ivasyuk. With these ensembles Victor also had the chance to travel and represent Ukraine, and the former Soviet Union, at many international music festivals.

In 1988, Victor became one of the founders and artistic director of "Ne Zhurys!" ("Don't Worry!"), a cabaret-style musical theater group that mixed political satire with song. Their numerous musical-theatre productions often sharply criticized and mocked the Soviet regime and were instrumental in raising national awareness in Ukraine prior to its independence. They were bold enough to perform songs banned by Soviet censors and in 1989 became the first group to publicly perform Mykhailo Verbytsky's "Shche ne vmerla Ukraina" ("Ukraine's glory has not perished"), the once and future national anthem of independent Ukraine, which was officially banned at the time.

Victor's popularity has afforded him other artistic opportunities, both on television, as host of the popular music video request show "Vy nam pysaly" ("You wrote us"), and on stage, as an actor or master of ceremonies at various concerts and productions.

Victor has entertained audiences in Afghanistan, Argentina, Australia, Belgium, Brazil, Canada, England, Germany, India, Laos, Latvia, Lithuania, Mongolia, Paraguay, Poland, Russia, the United States and many other countries. He has also had the honour of being selected to perform before Hillary Clinton, the First Lady of the United States of America, during her visit to Ukraine.

== Current musical projects ==
In the early nineties, Victor formed "Chetvertyj Kut" ("The Fourth Corner") with Oleh Yarema, a young virtuoso guitarist and composer, and Roman Lozynsky, a violinist and sound engineer. Their self-titled debut album, an acoustic music project which interlaced instrumental compositions with romantic ballads, became one of the top 10 selling albums in Ukraine for 1994. "Chetvertyj Kut" has grown to include bassist Oleh "John" Suk and drummer/percussionist/sound-engineer Andrij Piatakov in many of their recordings. "Alina", a song from their album "Treba Vstaty i Vyjty" ("Stand Up and Leave"), soared to the No. 1 position on Lviv's hit parade after only 3 days of radio airtime.

Victor Morozov is currently performing as a soloist, continuing his work with the "Chetvertyj Kut" project and "Ne Zhurys!", as well as collaborating with the groups "Mertvyj Piven'" (the CD "Aphrodisiacs" was released in March 2003) and "Batiar-Band Halychyna" (releasing a CD of Lviv batiar songs – "Tilku vi Lvovi" ("Only in Lviv") – in November 2002).

Victor often sits as a member of the jury in various Ukrainian music festivals.

== Translator ==
In addition to his music career, Viktor Morozov is also a highly regarded translator. His translations of T.S. Eliot's essays, The Exorcist" by William Peter Blatty and other works were published in various Ukrainian literary journals throughout the 1980s. Victor's translations of world famous Paulo Coelho's novels "The Alchemist)" (May 2000), "Veronika Decides to Die" (December 2001) and "The Devil and Miss Prym" (September 2002) were published by "Klasyka" of Lviv. His translation of Benedict Anderson's "Imagined Communities" was published in April 2001 by Kyiv's "Krytyka". Victor's translation of J. K. Rowling's world bestsellers "Harry Potter and the Philosopher's Stone" (April 2002), "Harry Potter and the Chamber of Secrets" (September 2002), "Harry Potter and the Prisoner of Azkaban" (December 2002), "Harry Potter and the Goblet of Fire" (May 2003), "Harry Potter and the Order of the Phoenix" (November 2003), "Harry Potter and the Half-Blood Prince" (October 2005) and "Harry Potter and the Deathly Hallows" (September 2007) was published by Kyiv's "A-BA-BA-HA-LA-MA-HA".

Viktor Morozov was selected as a "Galician Knight" for 2003 in the "Writer of the Year" category for his translation of the Harry Potter series into Ukrainian.

== Family ==
Viktor Morozov is the father of singer Mariana Sadovska.
