= Perverzion =

Perverzion is a novel written by Ukrainian author Yuri Andrukhovych. The novel is considered to be part of Ukrainian post-modernist literature. It was originally written in 1997 in Ukrainian but was translated into English by Michael M. Naydan and published in 2005. The book was published by Northwestern University Press, ISBN 0-8101-1964-1. It tells the tragicomic last days of a poet in Venice.

Some literary scholars and critics have identified a conditional trilogy consisting of the novels Recreation, Moscoviada, and Perversion: the hero (antihero) of each of them is a bohemian poet who finds himself in the midst of the fatal transformation of “physics into metaphysics” and vice versa. All of the novels are a rather tangible mixture of genres and styles (confession, “black realism,” thriller, gothic, satire), and the time of the action in them is very limited and condensed: one night in Recreation, one day in Moscoviada, five days and nights in Perversion. Oleksandra Hnatiuk noted that these works are united by postcolonial discourse. The author himself did not insist on this understanding of his novels.

== See also ==
- List of Ukrainian-language poets
- List of Ukrainian-language writers
- Ukrainian literature
