= Oleksandr Fraze-Frazenko =

Ukrainian filmmaker, poet, musician, translator

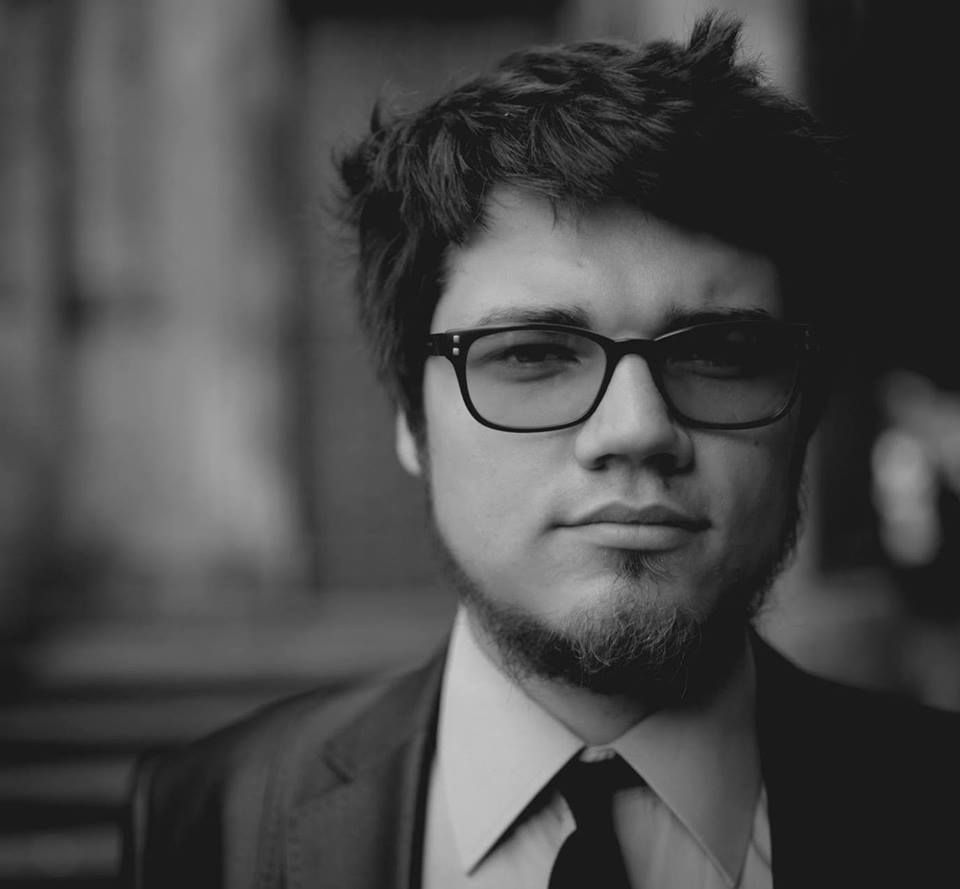
The portrait of a Ukrainian film director Oleksandr Fraze-Frazenko

Oleksandr Fraze-Frazenko (Ukrainian: Олександр Фразе-Фразенко; born 16 June 1989, Lviv) is a Ukrainian poet, filmmaker, author, photographer, translator, and musician. He is a co-founder of the OFF Laboratory production company and is known for his poetic documentaries about Ukrainian literary and artistic figures.

== Biography ==
Oleksandr Fraze-Frazenko was born on 16 June 1989 in Lviv, Ukraine. He studied at the School of Joy (Школа радості) and later at the Lviv Humanitarian Gymnasium, before graduating from the Ukrainian Academy of Printing with a degree in editing and journalism.

During the early years of the Russo-Ukrainian war, Fraze-Frazenko remained in Ukraine, active in cultural and volunteer initiatives. In January 2025, Ukrainian press reported that he left for the United States citing political pressure and threats. He is currently a writer-in-residence at City of Asylum, Pittsburgh.

== Career ==
=== Film ===
Fraze-Frazenko works predominantly in documentary and experimental film. His first feature film, Don’t Lie to Me, premiered in 2016 at the Wiz-Art Lviv International Short Film Festival.

He is best known for poetic documentaries focusing on Ukrainian modernist poets, including Chubai (2014), The House on Seven Winds (2015), and An Aquarium in the Sea (2016). Harvard professor George G. Grabowicz described An Aquarium in the Sea as “not just a documentary” but a work combining documentary and artistic vision.

=== Literature and Translation ===
Fraze-Frazenko has published several poetry collections and a novel Nothing is Under Control.

He also published a Ukrainian translation of Jim Morrison’s poetry — the first such translation. Additionally, he has translated English Restoration poets, including John Wilmot, Earl of Rochester. Some of his film scripts have been published as books, such as An Aquarium in the Sea: The Complete Script and The House on Seven Winds: The Complete Script.

=== Music and Art ===
Fraze-Frazenko’s music spans improvisation, indie rock, and experimental styles. His discography includes more than 100 albums. He leads bands Fraze-Frazenko & The Happy Lovers and Ceramic Knives, which fuse Ukrainian poetry with rock instrumentation. His photography and visual art have been exhibited internationally, with works in collections in Ukraine, the United States, Germany, and Canada.

== Selected works ==
=== Filmography ===
- Chubai (2014)
- The House on Seven Winds (2015)
- An Aquarium in the Sea (2016)
- Don’t Lie to Me (2016)

=== Bibliography ===
- The Story of a Killer (2007)
- First. Middle. Last (2008)
- Twilight House (2009)
- Mass (2010)
- The Days of Loss (2014)
- The Hole. Short selected (2015)
- Happy Lovers (2021)
- FAQ Ukraine (2024)
- Nothing Is Under Control (2025)
