= Yurii Andrukhovych =

Ukrainian writer, poet, essayist and translator

- Юрій Андрухович
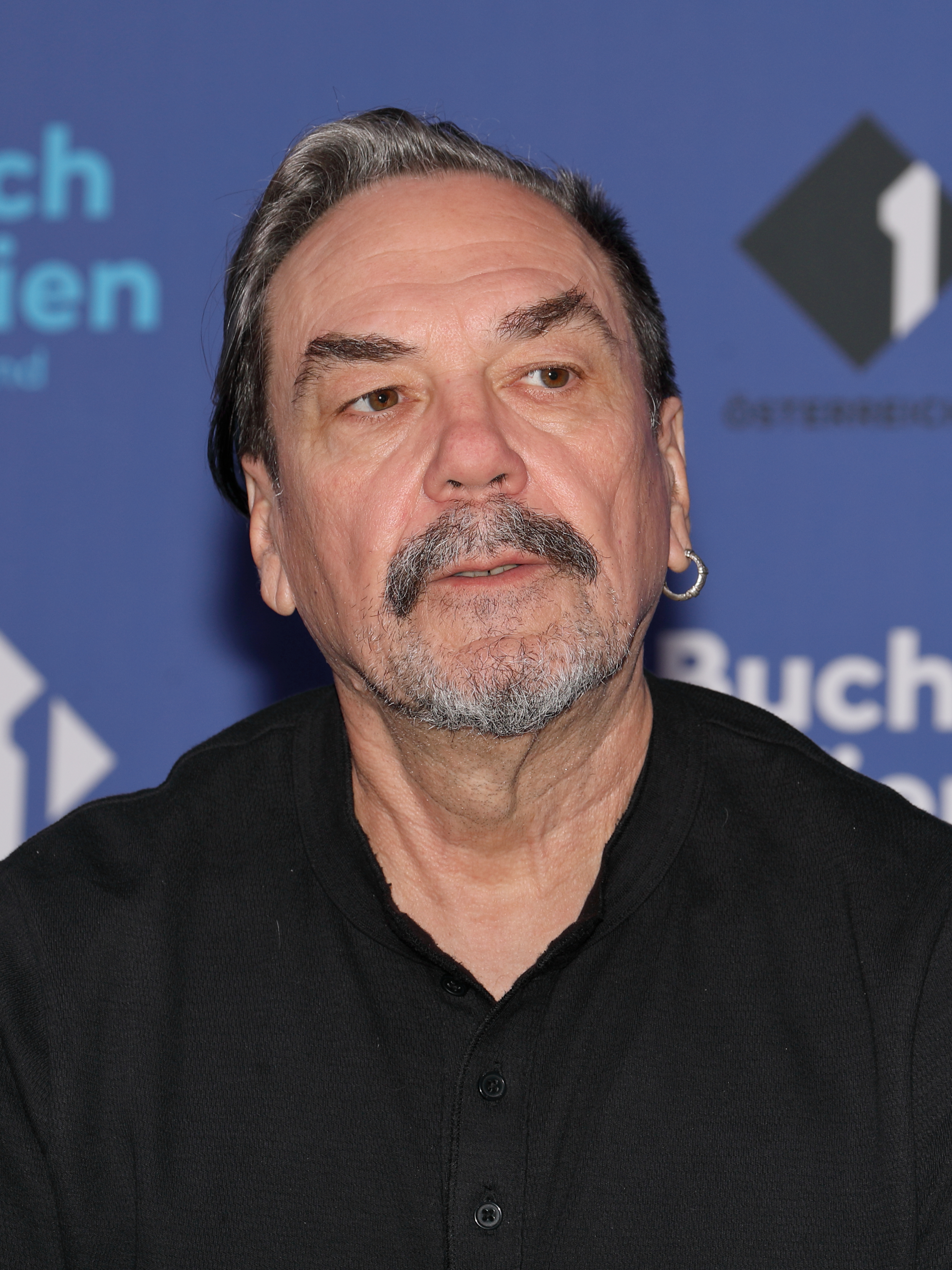
- Andrukhovych in 2025
- Born: Yurii Ihorovych Andrukhovych; 13 March 1960 (age 66); Stanislav, Ukrainian SSR, Soviet Union
- Occupations: Prose writer; poet; essayist; translator
- Children: Sofia Andrukhovych
- Writing career
- Language: Ukrainian

Yurii Ihorovych Andrukhovych (Ukrainian: Юрій Ігорович Андрухович, pronounced [ˈjur⁽ʲ⁾ij ɐndrʊˈxɔwɪt͡ʃ]; born March 13, 1960), who spells his name as Yuri Andrukhovych in English, is a Ukrainian prose writer, poet, essayist, and translator.

Andrukhovych is a representative of the Stanislav phenomenon, a group of Ivano-Frankivsk postmodernist writers and co-founder of the poetic group Bu-Ba-Bu.

== Biography ==
As a child Andrukhovych attended a school with a focus on studying German language and dreamt to become an archaeologist or a rock star. According to his own memoirs, after recognizing his poor prospects in archaeology he decided to study journalism. In 1982 Andrukhovych graduated with a degree in editing from the Ukrainian Printing Institute in Lviv. In the following years he worked for a newspaper and completed army service.

In 1985, Andrukhovych co-founded the Bu-Ba-Bu poetic group, which stands for «burlesque, side-show, buffoonery» (Ukrainian: бурлеск, балаган, буфонада) together with Oleksandr Irvanets and Viktor Neborak. The authors aimed to revive the carnival and comedic literary style. As a member of the group Andrukhovych received the title "partiarch of Ukrainian literature".

In 1989 Andrukhovych was accepted as a member of the National Writers' Union of Ukraine, but in 1991 left the organization and initiated the creation of an alternative organ known as Association of Ukrainian Writers, later serving as its vice-president. In 1991 he graduated from literature courses at the Maxim Gorky Literary Institute in Moscow.

Between 1991 and 1995 Andrukhovych worked as an editor in a number of Ukrainian literary publications. He also authored the cultural review in Den newspaper and together with Yurko Izdryk founded Ukraine's first postmodernist journal. In 1996 Andrukhovych became Candidate of Sciences after submitting a thesis on the works of Bohdan-Ihor Antonych. He also read a masters' course on contemporary Central and Eastern European literatures at Lviv University, but refused to pursue a career in literary science. Since 2005 Andrukhovych has been co-operating with Polish experimental band Karbido, writing song texts and performing as a singer.

== Family ==
Yuriy Andrukhovych is the father of the Ukrainian writer Sofia Andrukhovych.

== Political views ==
Starting from the late 1980s Andrukhovych was an active participant of the liberal-democratic People's Movement of Ukraine. Andrukhovych writes in Ukrainian and is known for his pro-Ukrainian and pro-European views. In his interviews, he said that he respected both the Ukrainian and Russian languages and claims that his opponents do not understand that the very survival of the Ukrainian language is threatened. During the 2004 presidential elections in Ukraine he signed, together with eleven other writers, an open letter in which he called Sovietic Russian culture: "language of pop music and criminal slang".

== Works ==
Andrukhovych has published novels, poetry collections, short stories, and essays, as well as literary translations from English, German, Polish, and Russian.

=== Poetry ===
- The Sky and Squares (Небо і площі, 1985)
- Downtown (Середмістя, 1989)
- Exotic Birds and Plants (Екзотичні птахи і рослини, 1991)
- Songs for the Dead Rooster (Пісні для мертвого півня, 2004)

=== Novels ===
- Recreations (Рекреації, 1992)
- The Moscoviad, (Московіада, 1993)
- Perverzion (Перверзія, 1996)
- Twelve Rings (Дванадцять обручів, 2003)
- The Secret. Instead of a Novel (Таємниця. Замість роману, 2007)
- Lovers of Justice (Коханці юстиції, 2017)
- Radio Night (Радіо Ніч, 2020)

=== Short story collections ===
- On the Left, Where the Heart Is (Зліва, де серце, 1989)

=== Essays ===
- Disorientation on Location (Дезорієнтація на місцевості, 1999)
- My Europe (Моя Європа, 2001), co-authored with the Polish writer Andrzej Stasiuk
- The Devil's Hiding in the Cheese (Диявол ховається в сирі, 2006)

=== Translations ===
- The Day Mrs Day Died (День смерті Пані День, 2006), an anthology of Ukrainian translations of American poetry from the 1950s and 1960s
- "Majdan! Ukraine, Europa", 2014, co-authored with Yaroslav Hrytsak and others (in German)

Andrukhovych's works have been translated and published in Poland, Germany, Canada, Hungary, Finland, Croatia (separate books), United States, Sweden, Spain, Russia‚ Austria (separate publications)

Translations of Yurii Andrukhovich's works into foreign languages were published by the following publishing houses: Wydawnictwo Czarne (Poland), Suhrkamp Verlag (Germany), Knihovna Listů, Fra, Vĕtrné Mlyny (Czech Republic), BAUM, Kalligram, Absynt (Slovakia), József Attila Kör, Ráció, Gondolat (Hungary), Polirom, ALLFA (Romania), Klio (Serbia), Cankarjeva Založba (Slovenia), Fraktura (Croatia), "Парадокс" (Bulgaria), "Македонска реч" (North Macedonia).

Andrukhovych's poetry was set to music by the Ukrainian bands "Mertvyi Piven" (The Dead Rooster) and "Plach Ieremii" (Jeremiah’s Lament), and by the Polish group Karbido.

== Awards and honors ==
For his literary writings and activity as a public intellectual, Andrukhovych has been awarded numerous national and international prizes, including the following:

- 2001 — Herder Prize, German international award.
- 2005 — Special award of Erich Maria Remarque Peace Prize.
- 2006 — Leipzig Book Award for European Understanding, German international literary award.
- 2006 — Angelus Award, Polish international literary award. Andrukhovych was the first winner of this award.
- 2014 — Hannah Arendt Prize, German human rights award.
- 2016 — Goethe Medal, German international award.
- 2017 — Vilenica International Literary Prize, Slovenian international award.
- 2022 — Heinrich Heine Prize, presented by the German city of Dusseldorf.

Andrukhovych is a member of the editorial board of Ukrainian periodicals Krytyka and Potyah 76. He is also a juror for the Zbigniew Herbert International Literary Award.

== See also ==
- List of Ukrainian literature translated into English
- List of Ukrainian-language writers
