= Printing in Ukraine =

History of printing and book publishing in Ukraine

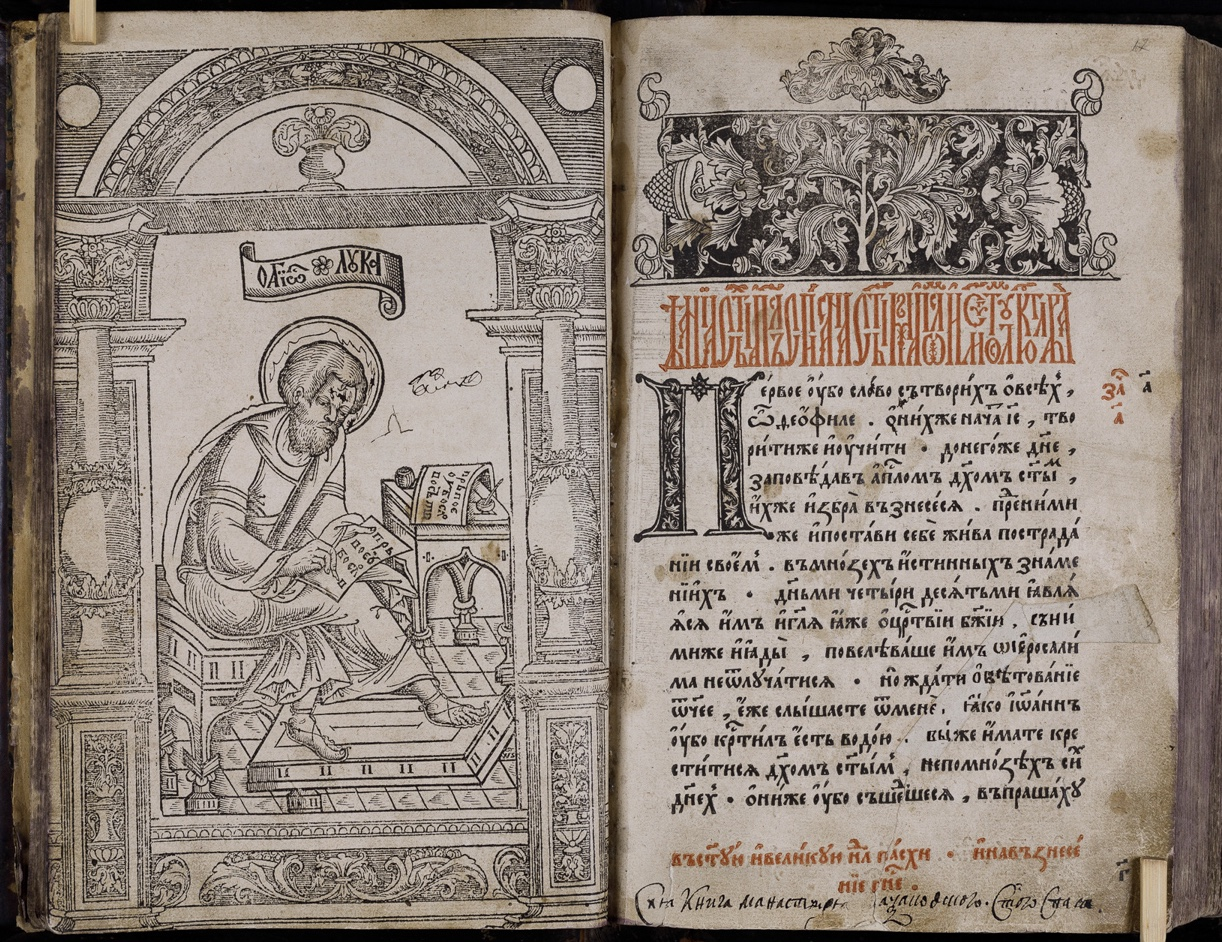
The Lviv Apostol (1574), the oldest surviving book printed in the territory of Ukraine

Printing in Ukraine (Ukrainian: Друкарство в Україні) refers to the interrelated branches of culture and economy involving book publishing, the printing industry itself, and the distribution of printed matter on the territory of modern Ukraine. Printing is reliably documented in Ukraine from the 16th century onward, and from the 15th to the 20th century it was the principal means of mass-disseminating knowledge, news, and ideas. With the development of new media, printed books and periodicals retain a significant role, but the scope of the printing industry has changed.

== History ==
=== Predecessors of Ukrainian printing ===
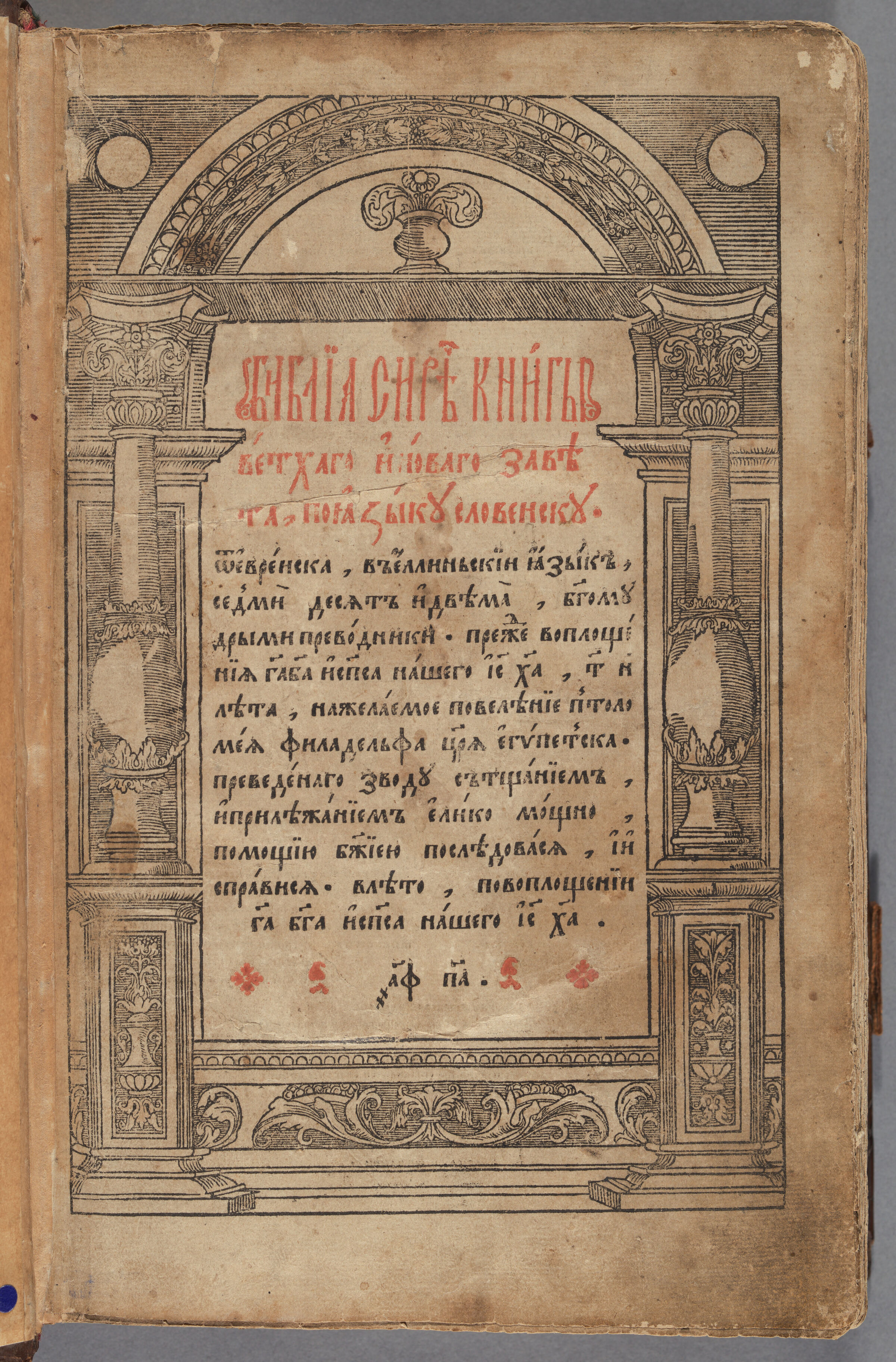
Title page of the Ostrog Bible (1581), the first complete printed edition of the Bible in Church Slavonic

The forerunner of printing was the production of impressions from carved wooden blocks (xylography). In Ukraine, paper icons and depictions of monasteries that were distributed to pilgrims were produced in this manner.

Movable-type printing was known in China from the 11th century, first using ceramic type and later wooden and metal type. The European tradition of printing in the modern sense, however, became possible only after Johannes Gutenberg's development in the 1440s of a device for casting metal type in matrices. From Germany, printing spread quickly to Italy (from 1465), France (from 1470), Poland (from 1473), Hungary (from 1473), and other European countries. Within the 16th century roughly 500,000 book titles were printed in Europe, and during the 17th century around 3 million.

Among the early Cyrillic printers active in this period was Schweipolt Fiol, who in Kraków around 1491 printed liturgical books in Church Slavonic for Eastern Orthodox readers, including Oktoechos and Horologion. These editions are considered direct predecessors of East Slavic printing.

=== Beginning of Ukrainian printing ===
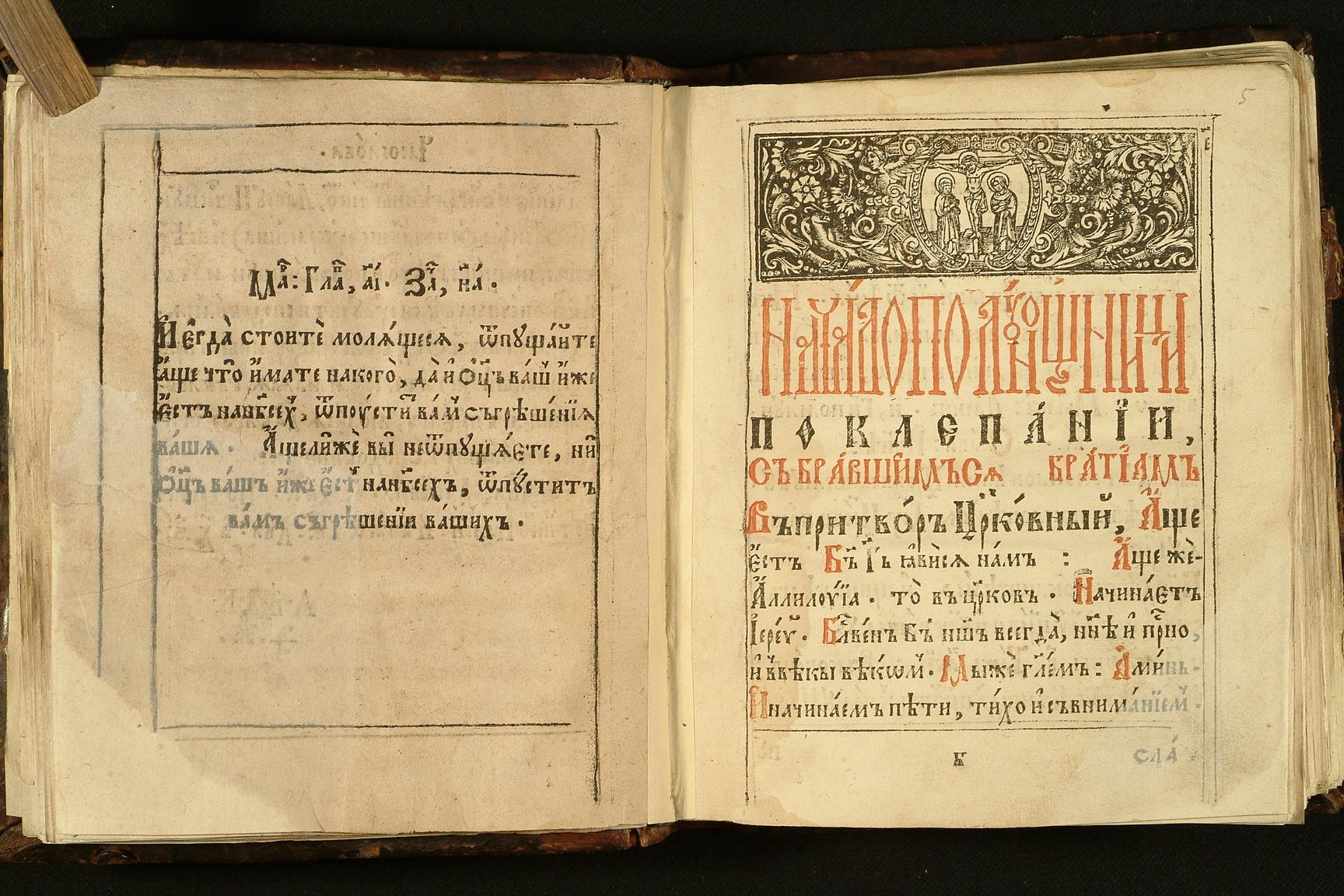
Book of Hours (1616), the first book printed in Kyiv

The Russian printer Ivan Fedorov (Fedorovych), who had earlier worked in Moscow and Zabłudów, settled in Lviv in 1572. There in 1574 he printed two books that mark the conventional starting point of Ukrainian printing: the Apostol (a liturgical edition of the Acts of the Apostles and Epistles) and a Primer (Bukvar), the first known printed schoolbook in the Eastern Slavic lands. Fedorov subsequently moved to Ostroh, where, under the patronage of Prince Vasyl-Kostiantyn Ostrozky, he printed the celebrated Ostrog Bible in 1581, the first complete printed Bible in Church Slavonic.

Following Fedorov's death in 1583, his Lviv press was acquired by the Lviv Dormition Brotherhood, whose printing house became one of the most influential publishing centres in Eastern Europe in the 17th century, producing liturgical, polemical, and educational books in Church Slavonic and Ruthenian.

A regional tradition of printing developed in Volhynia from the late 16th century, with presses operating in Ostroh, Derman, Pochaiv, Lutsk, Kremenets, and other towns. The Pochaiv Lavra press, founded in the early 17th century, became one of the leading Uniate printing centres of the Polish–Lithuanian Commonwealth and remained active into the 19th century.

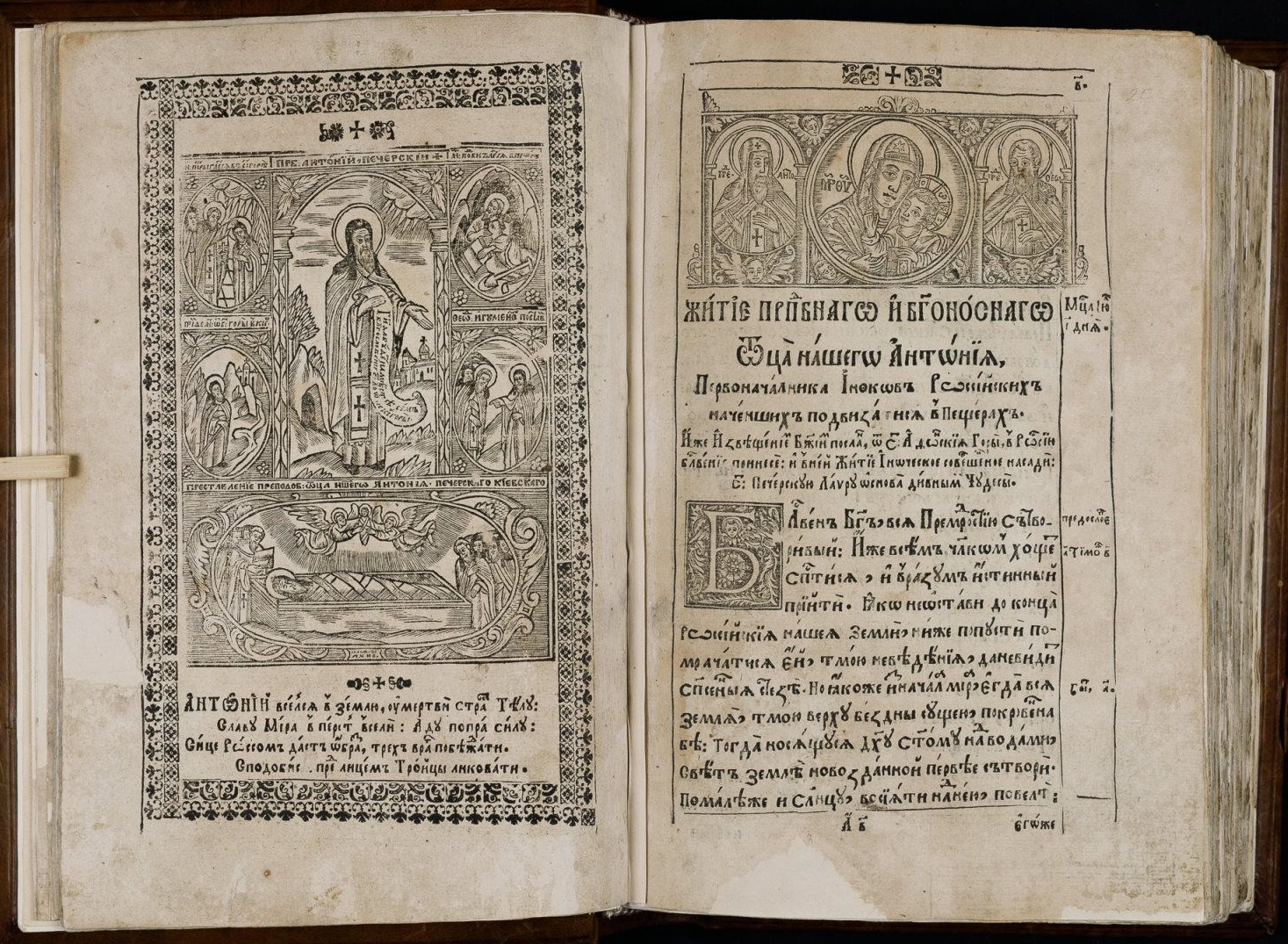
Kyiv Caves Patericon (1661), printed at the Kyiv Pechersk Lavra press

In the 17th century, printing developed extensively across the territory of modern Ukraine. The press of the Kyiv Pechersk Lavra, founded in 1615 under Yelisey Pletenetsky, became the largest in the Cossack Hetmanate; in 1616 it produced its first book, the Book of Hours, the first book printed in Kyiv. Printing presses also operated at Pochaiv Lavra, Chernihiv, Novhorod-Siverskyi, Univ, and elsewhere. These presses produced not only liturgical books but also works of theology, polemics, history, and grammar, including Meletius Smotrytsky's influential Slavonic Grammar (1619).

=== Period of tsarist censorship ===
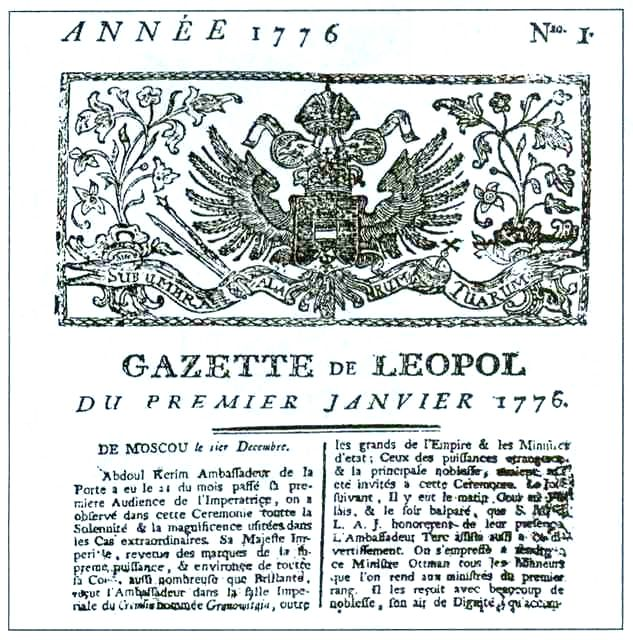
Gazette de Léopol (1776), the first newspaper published in the territory of Ukraine, in French in Lviv

After the political incorporation of Left-bank Ukraine into the Tsardom of Russia under the Treaty of Pereyaslav (1654) and the subsequent absorption of Kyivan church institutions into the Moscow Patriarchate (1686), Ukrainian-language printing came under direct control of the imperial authorities. A ukase of Peter the Great in 1720 forbade the Kyiv Pechersk Lavra and Chernihiv presses from printing any books except those that fully matched Russian editions in language and content. The decree effectively ended independent Ukrainian-language ecclesiastical and scholarly printing in the territory under Russian rule.

In the western Ukrainian lands, which were under Polish and later Austrian rule, printing continued more freely. In Lviv, the first newspaper on the territory of Ukraine, Gazette de Léopol, was published in French in 1776.

=== First publications in vernacular Ukrainian ===
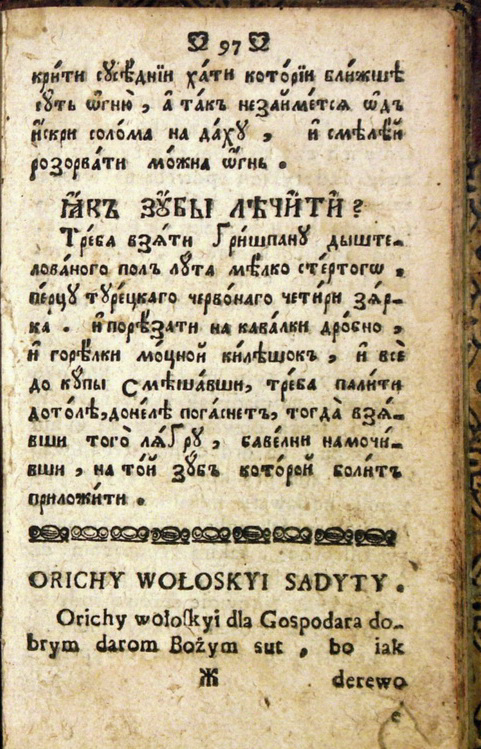
Knyzhytsia dlia hospodarstva (1788): pages in the colloquial Ukrainian language of the period

The publication of Ivan Kotliarevsky's burlesque travesty Eneida in Saint Petersburg in 1798 is conventionally regarded as the beginning of modern Ukrainian-language literature in print. The first complete edition of the poem was published in Kharkiv in 1842. Other early publications in the vernacular included works by Petro Hulak-Artemovsky, Hryhorii Kvitka-Osnovianenko, and the literary almanacs of the Kharkiv Romantics.

In Galicia, the literary group known as the Ruthenian Triad (Markiian Shashkevych, Ivan Vahylevych, Yakiv Holovatsky) published the almanac Rusalka Dnistrovaia in Buda in 1837, the first book printed in vernacular Ukrainian using a phonetic spelling.

=== Period of Russian imperial bans ===
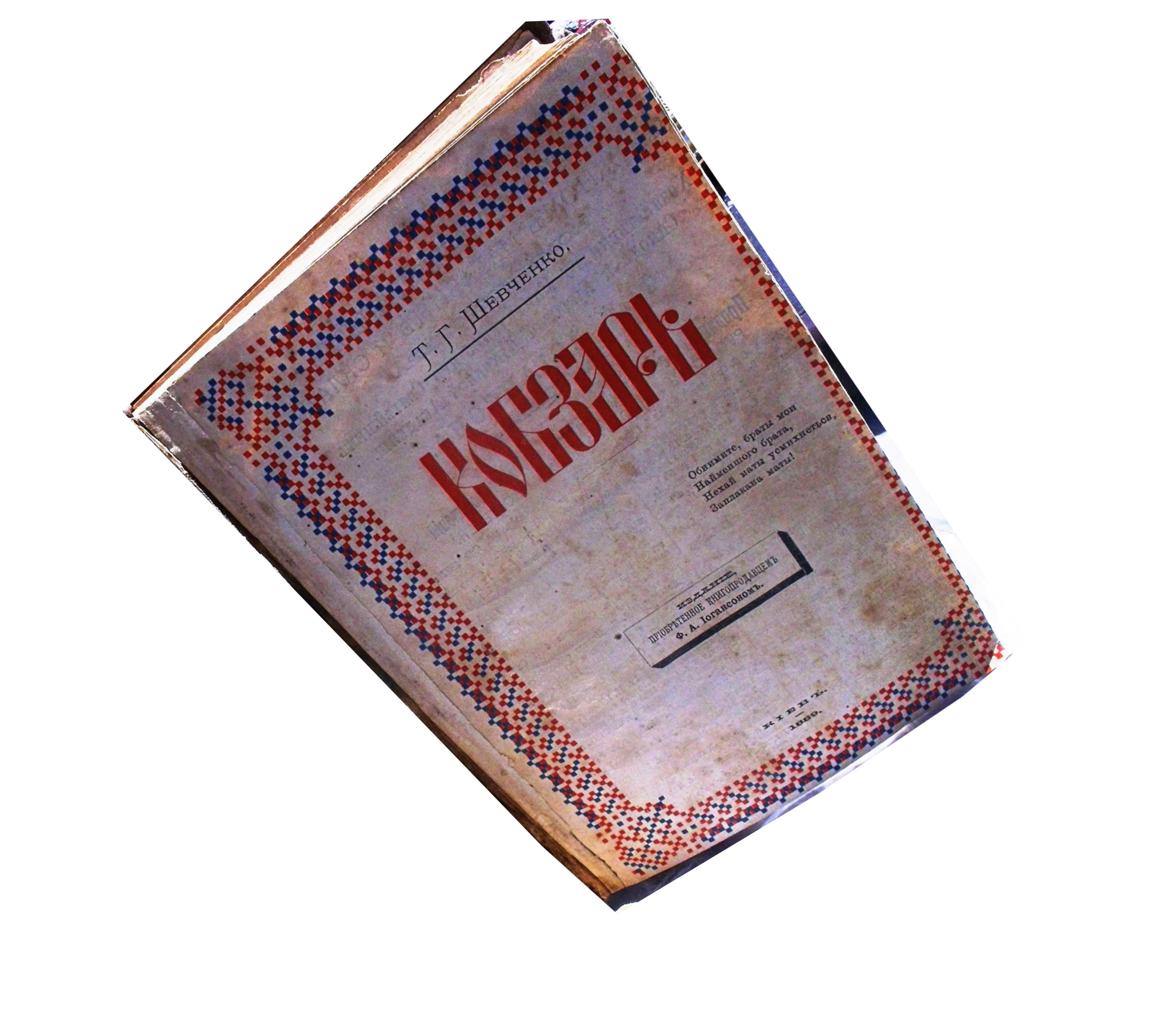
First Kyiv edition of Taras Shevchenko's Kobzar (1889), delayed for decades by imperial censorship

Two notorious imperial decrees sharply restricted Ukrainian-language publishing within the Russian Empire. The Valuev Circular of 1863, issued by Interior Minister Pyotr Valuev, banned the publication of religious and educational books in Ukrainian. The Ems Ukaz of 1876, issued by Tsar Alexander II, extended the prohibition to virtually all original works and translations into Ukrainian, including theatrical performances, song lyrics, and the import of Ukrainian books from abroad.

As a result, between the 1860s and the early 20th century, Ukrainian-language printing in the Russian Empire was either driven underground or relocated to Galicia under Austro-Hungarian rule. In Lviv and other Galician centres, the Shevchenko Scientific Society (founded 1873, reorganised 1892) and the Prosvita society became the principal publishers of Ukrainian-language scholarship, fiction, and popular education. The first Kyiv edition of Taras Shevchenko's Kobzar could only appear in 1889 because of these restrictions.

=== After the 1905–1907 Revolution ===
The Russian Revolution of 1905 led to a partial relaxation of imperial censorship. Ukrainian-language newspapers, journals, and books appeared legally in Dnieper Ukraine for the first time in decades. Notable titles included the daily Rada (Kyiv, from 1906) and the literary monthly Literaturno-Naukovyi Vistnyk, whose editorial offices were transferred from Lviv to Kyiv in 1907 under the leadership of Mykhailo Hrushevsky. The renewed restrictions of 1910–1914 again narrowed the field, but the publishing infrastructure that emerged in this period laid the basis for the rapid expansion of Ukrainian publishing during the revolutionary years of 1917–1921.

=== After the First World War ===
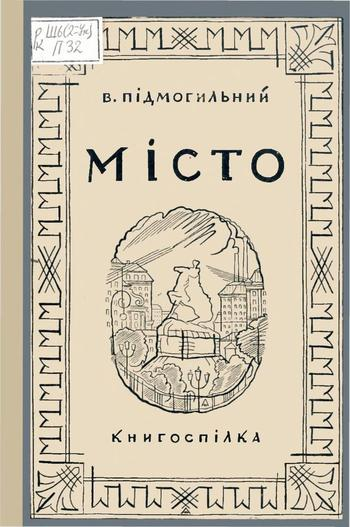
The City (1928) by Valerian Pidmohylny

The collapse of the Russian Empire and the establishment of the Ukrainian People's Republic (1917–1920) prompted an explosive growth in Ukrainian-language publishing. According to estimates, more than 1,000 Ukrainian-language periodicals appeared during the revolutionary period, and the output of books in Ukrainian increased many times over.

In the early years of the Ukrainian Soviet Socialist Republic, the policy of Ukrainization (especially after 1923) further accelerated this trend. State publishers such as Knyhospilka and the State Publishing House of Ukraine (DVU) issued large editions of Ukrainian classics, contemporary literature, and translations of world authors. Major writers of the period whose works were widely published included Pavlo Tychyna, Maksym Rylsky, Mykola Khvylovy, Valerian Pidmohylny, and Mykola Zerov.

In Western Ukraine, by then under Polish, Czechoslovak, and Romanian rule, an independent Ukrainian publishing sector continued to operate. The largest Ukrainian publishing concern in interwar Galicia was Ivan Tyktor's Ukrainska Presa (1923–1939), based in Lviv.

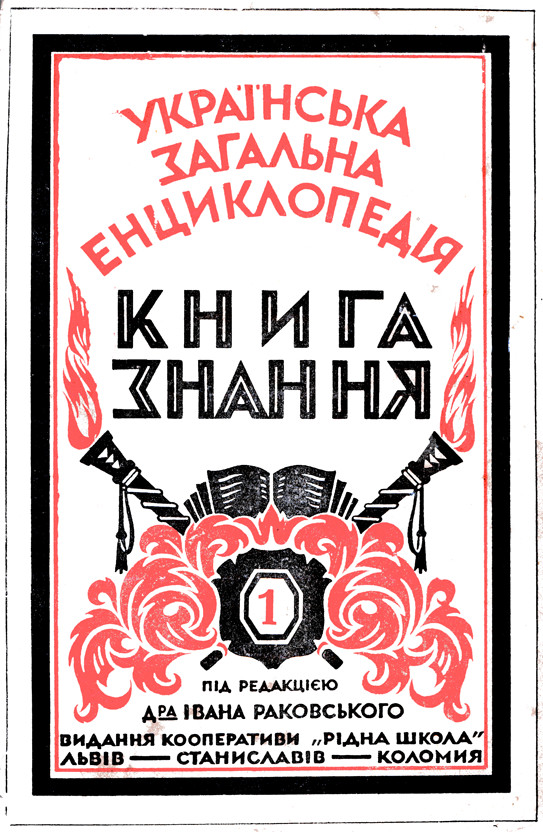
Ukrainian General Encyclopedia, volume 1, Lviv, 1930

=== During Stalinism ===
The Ukrainization policy was reversed in the early 1930s, and the Great Purge devastated the Ukrainian literary and publishing scene in what later became known as the Executed Renaissance. Many writers were arrested, executed, or sent to the Gulag, and their works were withdrawn from libraries and bookshops. Soviet censorship, administered by the Glavlit of the Ukrainian SSR, imposed strict ideological controls on every aspect of book production.

The use of Ukrainian in print was sharply reduced relative to the late 1920s. By the late 1930s, Russian-language editions dominated the publishing programmes of Soviet Ukraine's state publishers, and significant categories of Ukrainian historical and religious literature were entirely banned.

=== Post-war period ===
After the Second World War, the Soviet authorities consolidated state control over publishing across the entire territory of the Ukrainian SSR, including the newly incorporated western regions. Specialised state publishing houses were established for different fields: Dnipro (literature), Naukova Dumka (academic and scientific works), Veselka (children's books), Mystetstvo (the arts), Radianska Shkola (educational publishing), and others.

The post-war decades saw both major scholarly achievements, including the multi-volume Ukrainian Soviet Encyclopedia (1959–1965; second edition 1977–1985) and the Dictionary of the Ukrainian Language (in 11 volumes) (1970–1980), and intensified Russification, with print runs of Russian-language books in Ukraine consistently exceeding those of Ukrainian-language books from the late 1960s onward. Persecution of writers and dissidents resumed in the 1960s and 1970s, with the Sixtiers generation suffering arrests, internal exile, and publishing bans.

=== Independence era ===
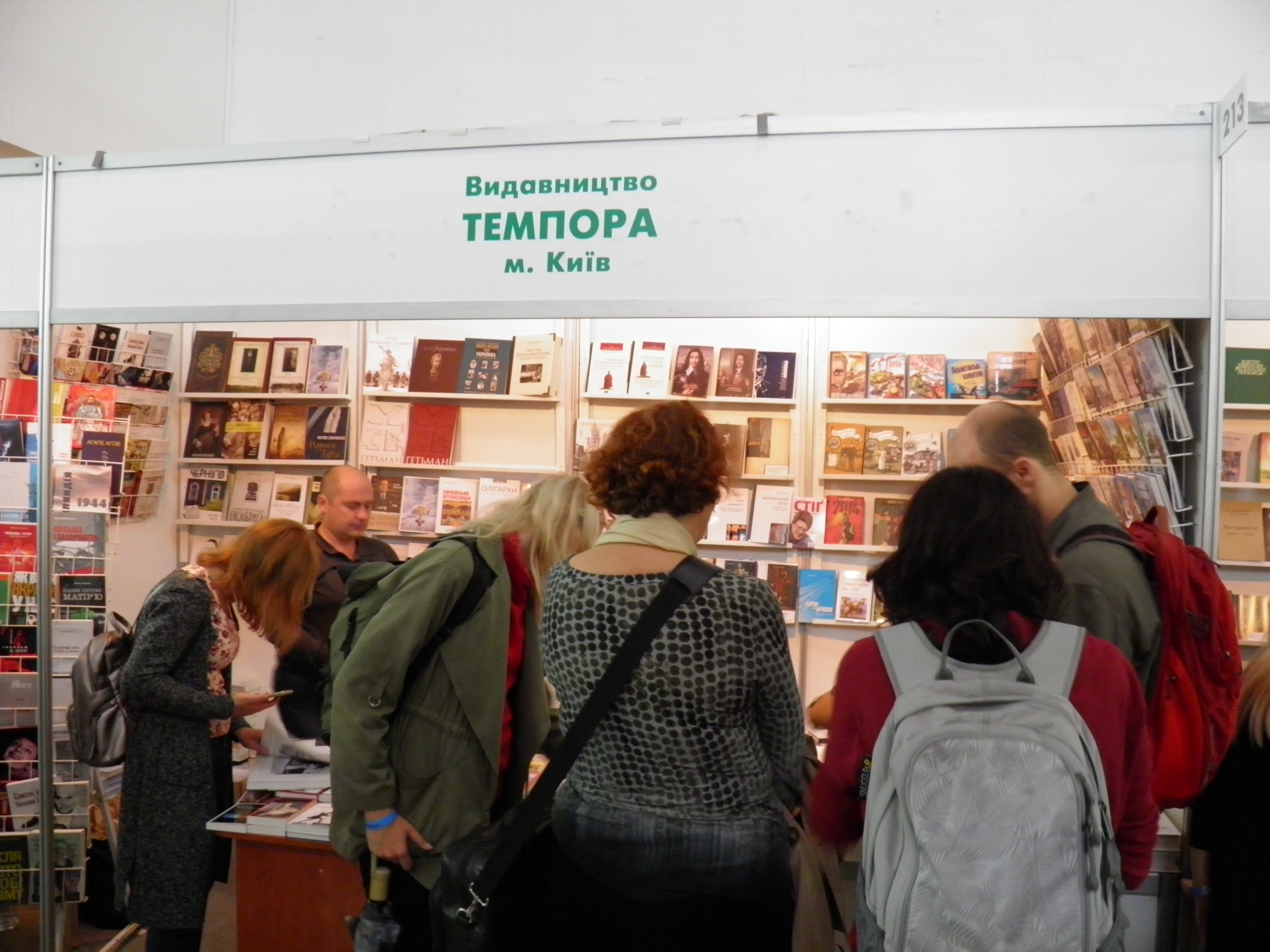
The Publishers' Forum in Lviv, the largest book fair in Ukraine

The restoration of Ukrainian independence in 1991 transformed the publishing industry. State monopolies were dismantled, dozens of new private publishers emerged, and previously banned authors and works, including Mykhailo Hrushevsky's monumental History of Ukraine-Rus', became freely available.

The 1990s were nevertheless a difficult decade for Ukrainian-language publishing because of economic dislocation, the dominance of low-priced imports from Russia, and weak state support. The situation gradually improved in the 2000s and 2010s, with the emergence of strong domestic publishers such as A-BA-BA-HA-LA-MA-HA, Folio, Vydavnytstvo Staroho Leva (Old Lion Publishing House), Nash Format, and Knyholav.

The Publishers' Forum in Lviv (founded 1994) became the largest annual book fair and literary festival in the country. The annual Book Arsenal festival in Kyiv (founded 2011) emerged as the second major industry event.

After the Revolution of Dignity (2014) and especially after the start of the full-scale Russian invasion in 2022, the share of Ukrainian-language editions in the domestic market increased significantly, while imports of Russian-language books were restricted by law.

== Printing in Ukraine by language ==
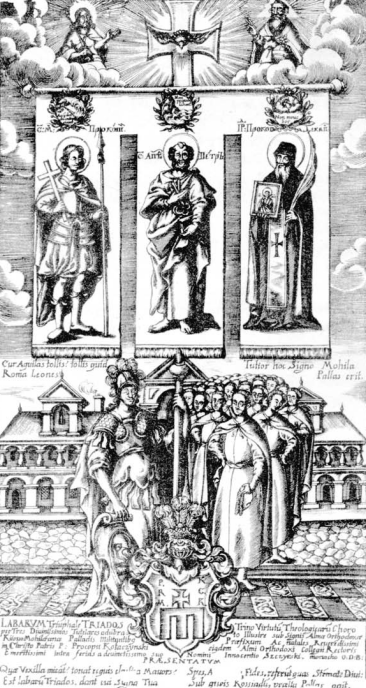
Emblematic sheet of Kyiv-Mohyla Academy from 1705, with dedication printed in Latin

The early printed output of Ukrainian lands and presses was multilingual and reflected the region’s complex ecclesiastical, educational, and political affiliations. Liturgical and theological works were commonly printed in Church Slavonic, which remained the dominant sacred language of Orthodox and Greek Catholic print culture well into the early modern period.

Alongside this, Ruthenian was widely used in chronicles, polemical literature, legal-administrative texts, and early educational works, particularly in the 16th–17th centuries, before its gradual displacement by Polish and later vernacular forms. From the late 16th century onward, Latin became increasingly important in scholarly, theological, and political printing, especially in the context of Jesuit education, the Ostroh Academy, and broader European intellectual exchange.

In the Polish–Lithuanian Commonwealth, particularly in urban centres such as Lviv, Polish-language printing expanded significantly during the 17th and 18th centuries, reflecting administrative integration, nobility culture, and the dominance of Polish in public life.

Certain confessional institutions, most notably the Dormition Brotherhood in Lviv, also produced editions in Greek, especially liturgical texts intended to maintain ties with Eastern Orthodox tradition and the wider Greek-speaking ecclesiastical world.

Finally, from the late 18th century onward and increasingly in the 19th century, vernacular Ukrainian began to appear in printed literature, initially in limited genres such as poetry, ethnographic collections, and popular religious or educational texts, marking the gradual transition toward a modern Ukrainian literary language.

=== German-language printing in Ukraine ===
Charter granted to the University of Czernowitz (Chernivtsi) by Franz Joseph I in 1875

German-language printing played a significant role in parts of Ukraine under Habsburg and, to a lesser extent, Russian imperial rule, particularly in Galicia, Bukovina, and the Black Sea region. In the Habsburg province of Galicia, with its capital in Lviv, German functioned as an important administrative, educational, and scholarly language, alongside Polish and Ukrainian. German-language newspapers, official gazettes, and academic publications circulated widely among imperial administrators, military personnel, and urban elites. In Bukovina, which it's center in Chernivtsi, German was particularly prominent as a lingua franca of administration and higher education under the Habsburg Monarchy. The University of Chernivtsi, founded in 1875, operated primarily in German, and the city developed a vibrant German-language press that coexisted with Romanian, Ukrainian, Polish, and Yiddish publishing traditions. In southern Ukraine, particularly in Odessa and the Black Sea region, German-language printing was also connected to the presence of German colonial settlements established in the late 18th and early 19th centuries. These communities maintained German-language schools, religious publications, and local newspapers, contributing to a broader multilingual print environment in the Russian Empire’s southern territories. German-language publishing in Ukraine thus functioned not as a unified national press, but as a layered imperial and colonial print system, reflecting the administrative needs of the Habsburg Monarchy and the settlement policies of the Russian Empire. Its decline began after the First World War and the collapse of imperial structures, as Ukrainian, Polish, Romanian, and Soviet institutions replaced multilingual imperial frameworks.

=== Jewish printing in Ukraine ===
Jewish printing in Ukrainian lands developed within two parallel traditions: Hebrew religious print culture, which was centred on religious texts, commentaries, and liturgy and Yiddish secular print culture, which expanded rapidly in the late 19th and early 20th centuries. Under the Russian Empire, Jewish printing was heavily regulated, but cities such as Vilna, Kyiv, Odessa, and Lviv became important regional centres for Hebrew and Yiddish publishing networks. By the late 19th century, Yiddish publishing expanded significantly alongside the growth of modern Jewish political movements (Bundism, Zionism, and socialist circles), with newspapers, pamphlets, and literary works circulating widely in the urban centres of the Pale of Settlement, including Kyiv and Odessa. This period marked the emergence of Yiddish as a modern secular literary language in Eastern Europe.

After the 1917 revolutions, the early Soviet period initially supported Jewish cultural autonomy under the policy of korenizatsiya, which included the expansion of Yiddish-language education, publishing, and press institutions. Ukraine, particularly Kyiv and Kharkiv, became one of the most important centres of Soviet Yiddish publishing, with state-supported newspapers, literary journals, and educational materials produced for Jewish workers and rural populations.

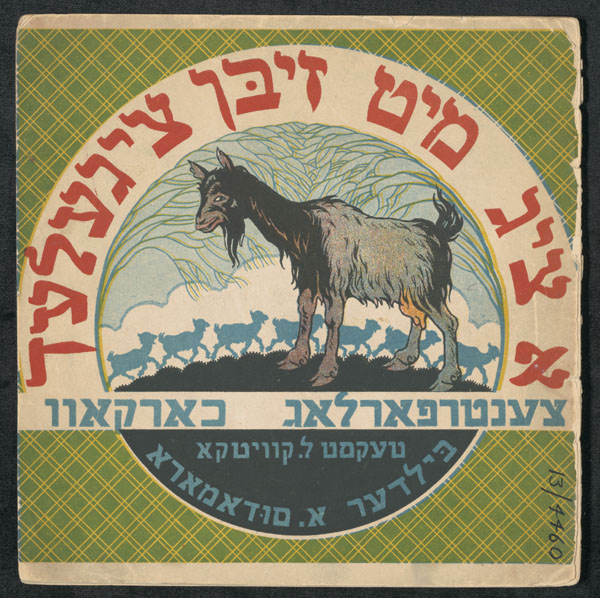
A book of Yiddish children's stories by Leyb Kvitko, published in Kharkiv in 1928

During the 1920s, Yiddish publishing in Soviet Ukraine reached its peak, with a wide network of state publishing houses producing secular literature, political texts, and translations of world literature. At the same time, Hebrew publishing declined sharply due to Soviet secularisation policies, which discouraged religious-language print culture.

Jewish printing in Soviet Ukraine during the Stalinist period was primarily conducted in Yiddish, which functioned as the main secular Jewish literary language under Soviet nationality policy in the 1920s. During the early Soviet period, Ukraine, particularly Kyiv and Kharkivm, was one of the largest centres of Yiddish publishing in the USSR, with a dense network of state and party-controlled presses producing newspapers, textbooks, literature, and ideological works for Jewish workers and collective farms. By the early 1930s, however, the reversal of korenizatsiya policies led to a sharp contraction of Yiddish-language publishing, alongside similar restrictions on other minority-language presses in the USSR. Many Yiddish newspapers and publishing houses were closed or merged into centralised Soviet structures, and editorial control increasingly shifted to Moscow. Despite this contraction, a limited number of Yiddish-language publications continued in Soviet Ukraine into the late 1930s, often under strict ideological supervision. These included party newspapers, literary journals, and translations of Soviet literature, but the range of permitted topics narrowed significantly, with increased censorship of Jewish historical, religious, and non-Soviet cultural content. By the late Stalin period, especially after the late 1930s purges and the destruction of much of the Jewish intelligentsia, Yiddish publishing in Ukraine was reduced to a minimal, state-controlled presence, and most independent Jewish cultural printing had effectively ceased.

=== Tatar printing in Ukraine ===
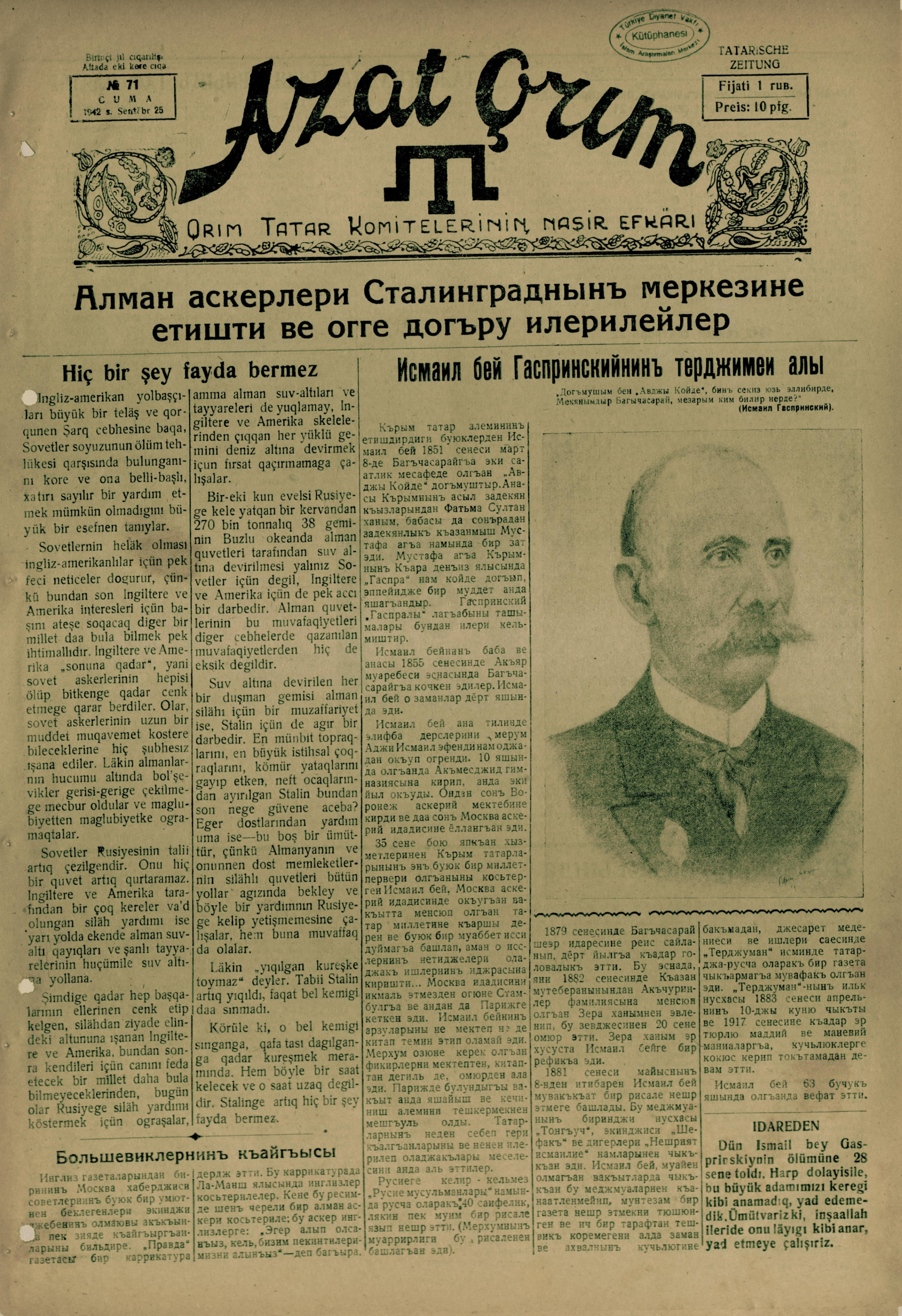
Azat Qrım, a Crimean Tatar newspaper published in Crimea under German occupation in 1942-1944

Printing in Crimean Tatar and other Tatar-related Turkic languages in Ukraine was historically concentrated in Crimea, which for most of its history functioned as a separate political and cultural space but became administratively linked to modern Ukraine in the 20th century. The earliest forms of Tatar manuscript and print culture in the region were closely connected to Islamic religious education, with Arabic-script texts circulating through mosques and madrasas.

By the late 19th century, under the Russian Empire, a modest but significant Crimean Tatar print tradition emerged, particularly in Bakhchisarai and Simferopol, where newspapers, religious works, and educational materials began to be printed in Crimean Tatar using Arabic script. This development was closely associated with the reform movement led by Ismail Gasprinsky, whose newspaper Tercüman (published in Bakhchisarai from 1883) became one of the most influential Turkic-language publications in the Russian Empire and circulated widely, including in Ukrainian imperial territories.

After 1917, the early Soviet period initially expanded Crimean Tatar cultural autonomy under korenizatsiya policies, leading to the establishment of Tatar-language publishing houses, newspapers, and educational printing programmes in Crimea. These included secular literature, political texts, and textbooks produced in both Arabic script (early Soviet years) and later Latinisation reforms.

During the 1920s, Crimean Tatar printing developed into a structured publishing system integrated into Soviet state publishing networks, with Simferopol serving as the main centre. However, this system was gradually dismantled in the 1930s as part of the wider reversal of korenizatsiya and increasing repression of minority cultural institutions.

=== Romanian-language printing in Ukraine ===
Romanian-language printing in Ukrainian territories developed primarily in Bukovina and Bessarabia, regions with significant Romanian-speaking populations and shifting imperial rule between the Habsburg Monarchy, the Russian Empire, and later Romania. In Bukovina under Austrian rule, Romanian-language publishing emerged alongside German, Ukrainian, Polish, and Yiddish presses. Early Romanian-language religious and educational texts were printed for the Orthodox population, often under the patronage of the Bukovinian Orthodox Church and local cultural societies.

Following the establishment of the University of Chernivtsi in 1875, Romanian intellectual life expanded further, and Romanian-language newspapers, literary journals, and political publications became an important part of the region’s multilingual print environment. These publications played a key role in the development of Romanian national consciousness in Bukovina while coexisting with German and Ukrainian press traditions. In Bessarabia, under the Russian Empire, Romanian-language printing was more restricted due to imperial censorship policies, especially in the 19th century. Nevertheless, religious texts and limited educational materials were occasionally published, often using Cyrillic-based Romanian orthography until the gradual adoption of Latin script in the early 20th century. After 1918, when Bessarabia became part of Greater Romania, Romanian-language publishing expanded significantly in the region, particularly in educational and administrative printing.

Romanian-language printing in Ukrainian lands therefore reflects the broader multi-imperial print ecology of the region, shaped by Habsburg liberal cultural policies in Bukovina and more restrictive Russian imperial censorship in Bessarabia, followed by a major expansion in the interwar Romanian state.

=== Hungarian-language printing in Ukraine ===
Hungarian-language printing in Ukrainian territories was concentrated primarily in Transcarpathia, a region that formed part of the Kingdom of Hungary within the Habsburg Monarchy until 1918. In this multilingual borderland, Hungarian functioned as the principal language of administration, secondary and higher education, and urban print culture, coexisting with Ruthenian, German, and Slovak languages. From the 18th century onward, Hungarian-language newspapers, official gazettes, and educational publications circulated in towns such as Uzhhorod, Mukachevo, and Berehove. These publications primarily served administrative elites, the Hungarian-speaking bourgeoisie, and state institutions, reflecting the integration of Transcarpathia into the broader political and cultural framework of the Hungarian half of the Habsburg Empire.

During the 19th century, Hungarian-language printing expanded significantly as part of the broader modernization of the Kingdom of Hungary. The press in Transcarpathia increasingly included political newspapers, religious publications, especially Catholic and Reformed, and educational materials aligned with Hungarian state policies of linguistic integration. However, Hungarian print culture in the region remained closely tied to urban centres and state institutions rather than rural populations, where Rusyn and other vernacular languages dominated. Following the collapse of the Austro-Hungarian Empire in 1918, Transcarpathia was incorporated into Czechoslovakia, where Hungarian-language publishing continued under minority-language protections. Newspapers, cultural journals, and school publications persisted, although under changing political conditions and increasing competition with Czech, Slovak, and Ukrainian-language presses. Hungarian-language printing in Ukrainian territories thus reflects the broader imperial and post-imperial multilingual press system of the Carpathian region, shaped by Habsburg administrative structures and later by interwar minority-language regimes.

=== Greek-language printing in Ukraine ===
Greek-language printing in Ukrainian lands reflected the long-standing presence of Greek communities in the northern Black Sea region and in major commercial centres such as Lviv, Nizhyn, Mariupol, and Odesa. The earliest significant Greek printing activity was associated with the Lviv Dormition Brotherhood, whose press, established in the late sixteenth century, issued several liturgical and educational works containing Greek texts or parallel Greek and Church Slavonic versions, intended for Orthodox clergy and scholars throughout Eastern Europe.

During the late eighteenth and early nineteenth centuries, Greek merchant colonies in southern Ukraine, especially in Odesa, fostered a vibrant Greek-language press. Odessa became one of the most important centres of the Greek diaspora outside the Ottoman Empire, publishing newspapers, commercial bulletins, educational materials, and political pamphlets. Greek printers and booksellers in the city played a notable role in the intellectual movement that preceded the Greek War of Independence, and Odesa served as a major conduit for the circulation of Greek Enlightenment literature. Greek-language publishing continued throughout the nineteenth century, supported by the substantial Greek populations of Odesa and the Azov region, particularly around Mariupol, where descendants of Crimean Greeks maintained schools, churches, and communal institutions. Publications included religious texts, schoolbooks, community newspapers, and commercial directories, serving both the urban mercantile elite and rural Greek-speaking communities.

By the early twentieth century, Greek-language printing in Ukraine had declined relative to Russian and Ukrainian publishing, though important newspapers and communal publications continued to appear in Odesa and Mariupol. The upheavals of revolution, civil war, and subsequent Soviet nationalities policies transformed Greek publishing, which briefly revived during the korenizatsiya period before facing severe repression in the late 1930s.

== Statistics ==
=== Number of Ukrainian-language book titles published by year ===
Under Russian and Habsburg rule (1848-1913)

Year	Russian Empire	Habsburg Monarchy	
Year	Russian Empire	Galicia	Transcarpathia
1848	3		
1862	41		
1865	5		
1870	5		
1875	30	62	4
1877	2		
1880	0		
1894	30	177	3
1913	246	326	22

World War I and Interwar era

Year	Ukrainian People's Republic/ Ukrainian SSR		Poland
Year	In Ukrainian	% of total	Poland
1917	747		
1918	1084	71	
1919	665		
1921	214	32	
1923	385	16	
1924-1925	1813	40	195
1927	2566		321
1928	3225	57	450
1929			391
1931	6455	80	
1934	2536	59	
1938			476
1939	1895	43	

World War II and postwar years

Year	Publications in Ukrainian SSR		
Year	Titles	% of total	Circulation, millions
1940	2012	41,5	41,3
1946	1311	61	
1950	1856	45	62,2
1952	1947		
1953	1924		
1954	2266		
1955	2378	49	
1958	3975	60	88,4
1959	4048	59,5	75,3
1961	4041		
1974			104,8
1978	2288		
1979	2414		
1980	2164		

In independent Ukraine

Year	Book titles	% of total	Circulation, millions	
Year	2005	10258	65,3	33,2
2006	10602	66,8	30,1	
2007	11825	65,7	28,8	
2008	16417	68,3	32,6	
2009	14797	65,8	27,5	
2010	14852	65,8	24,7	
2011	14962	65,5	23,5	
2012	16342	62,8	31,6	
2013	16310	62	37,9	
2014	14145	64,2	30,4	
2015	14117	70,7	23,7	
2016	14900	69,9	34	
2017	15789	72	32,9	
2018	16857	74,5	38,1	
2019	18142	74,3	52,5	
2020	14798	78	36,5	
2021	16206	76,8	39,9	
2022	7968	82,2	10,6	
2023	12688	83,5	22,6	
2024	12597	86,9	31,5	
2025	13379	88,8	30,8	

== See also ==
- Ivan Fedorov (printer)
- Ostrog Bible
- Kyiv Pechersk Lavra
- Lviv Dormition Brotherhood
- Valuev Circular
- Ems Ukaz
- Executed Renaissance
- Lviv Book Forum
