= Alphabet War =

Dispute about orthography of the Ukrainian language

The Alphabet War, (Note: Ukrainian: Азбучна війна, romanized: Azbučna vijna) also called the Alphabet Blizzard, (Note: Ukrainian: Азбучна завірюха, romanized: Azbučna zaviŕucha) was a controversy in the 19th century among Galician Ukrainians, which concerned attempts to romanize the Ukrainian alphabet.

The name may be derived from the discussions that took place in the early 1830s about the orthography of the Slovenian language ― the term (in German: ABC-Krieg) was first used by Matija Čop in an article of the same name, published 27 July 1833 in the magazine Illyrisches Blatt. It is still unclear when the term was first used in the context of linguistic and orthographic discussions in Galicia.

The first stage of the Alphabet War began in 1834 after the publication of a work by Joseph Lozynskyi in which it was argued that Latin letters, in contrast to the "dead" Cyrillic alphabet, could more fully and accurately reflect the nature of the Ukrainian language. Its second stage began in 1859 after the publication of a proposal by Josef Jireček to remake the Ukrainian writing system on the basis of the Czech alphabet. Discussions of the alphabet question lasted until the 1880s, but fell in and out of public discourse.

The competition between the Cyrillic and Latin alphabets acquired the features of an interethnic confrontation between Poles and Ukrainians. For Ukrainians, Cyrillic was a symbol of identity: first religious identity, as Cyrillic was associated with the Eastern Orthodox liturgical rite, and then national identity. Both sides did not take into account the fact that Latin conveyed the peculiarities of Western Ukrainian speech much more accurately.

Despite its small scale, the Alphabet War somewhat revived the cultural life of Galicia and became an important event in both the scientific and socio-political arenas.

The Alphabet War became one of the pretenses for the intensification of the Ukrainian national movement in Galicia, contributing to the consolidation of forces in the struggle against Polonization and the development of national culture. This common vernacular and ethnic awareness united the Ukrainian population of Austria-Hungary and the Russian Empire, but distracted the Ukrainian national movement from solving other problems.

The Alphabet War contributed to the emergence of Russophilia and Ukrainophilia in Galicia. Russophiles believed that the introduction of Latin was aimed at destroying the "all-Russian unity" of Ukrainians, Belarusians and Russians, which, in their opinion, was ensured through the use of Cyrillic. Proponents of Latin separated the Cyrillic Church Slavonic language from the living Ukrainian vernacular, thus becoming the predecessors of Ukrainophiles – proponents of the development of the Ukrainian language on a folk basis.

== First stage ==
The prologue to the Alphabet War was the publication in 1833 of Vaclav Zaleskyi's book Polish and Ruthenian Songs of the Galician People (Polish: Pieśni polskie i ruskie ludu galicyjskiego), which was a collection of both Polish and Ukrainian folk songs printed using Polish letters. In the introduction to the book, he expressed the hope that soon all the Slavic people would switch to Latin and therefore join the rest of European literature. For Zaleskyi, the Cyrillic alphabet was a cultural marker that separated European from non-European culture.

The first outbreak of the Alphabet War was caused in 1834 by the appearance in the Lviv weekly publication Rozmaitości Lwowskie of Joseph Lozynskyi's On the introduction of the Polish alphabet in Ruthenian writing (Polish: O wprowadzeniu abecadła polskiego do piśmiennictwa ruskiego) in which Lozynskyi, under the influence of Zaleskyi and Jernej Kopitar, proposed the replacement of the " dead" Cyrillic alphabet, which did not correspond to the phonetic system of the Ukrainian language, with a system based on the Polish alphabet. He called this alphabet Abecadło. The Polish alphabet, in his view, was more rational, more adapted to the everyday use, and more suited to the learning of reading and writing. In 1835 Lozynskyi published the ethnographic work Ruskoje wesile, written with Latin letters, to further elaborate on his ideas.

Lozynskyi's proposal was sharply criticized, including by members of the Ruthenian Triad, a literary group that included Galician poet Markiyan Shashkevych, who published the pamphlet Azbuka and Abecadło in 1836. Many Ukrainian researchers of the 20th and 21st centuries have agreed with the opinion expressed by Shashkevych that the Latinization of the Ukrainian alphabet risked the alienation of Western Ukraine from Eastern Ukraine. Critics of the adoption of Abecadło during the Alphabet Wars feared such a division could undermine national unity and the development of a Ukrainian culture in lands that were divided between Austria-Hungary and the Russian Empire, and would increase the threat of cultural assimilation of Ukrainians. Shashkevych's pamphlet played a key role in ending the first "Alphabet War." Lozynskyi's responses to criticism were rejected by a censor, and were not published until 1903, by O. Makovei.

Other critics of the adoption of Latin letters included D. Zubrytskyi, who wrote Apology of the Cyrillic or Ruthenian Alphabet (Polish: Apologia cyryliki czyli Azbuki ruskiej), and was among the first to oppose Lozynskyi, and J. Levytskyi, who wrote Response to the proposal to introduce the Polish alphabet in Ruthenian writing (Polish: Odpowiedź na zdanie o zaprowadzeniu abecadła polskiego do piśmiennictwa ruskiego) in 1834.

On the other hand, attempts to introduce Latin were supported by some Polish writers, such as A. Belowski, A. Dombczanski, and L. Semenski.

== Second stage ==
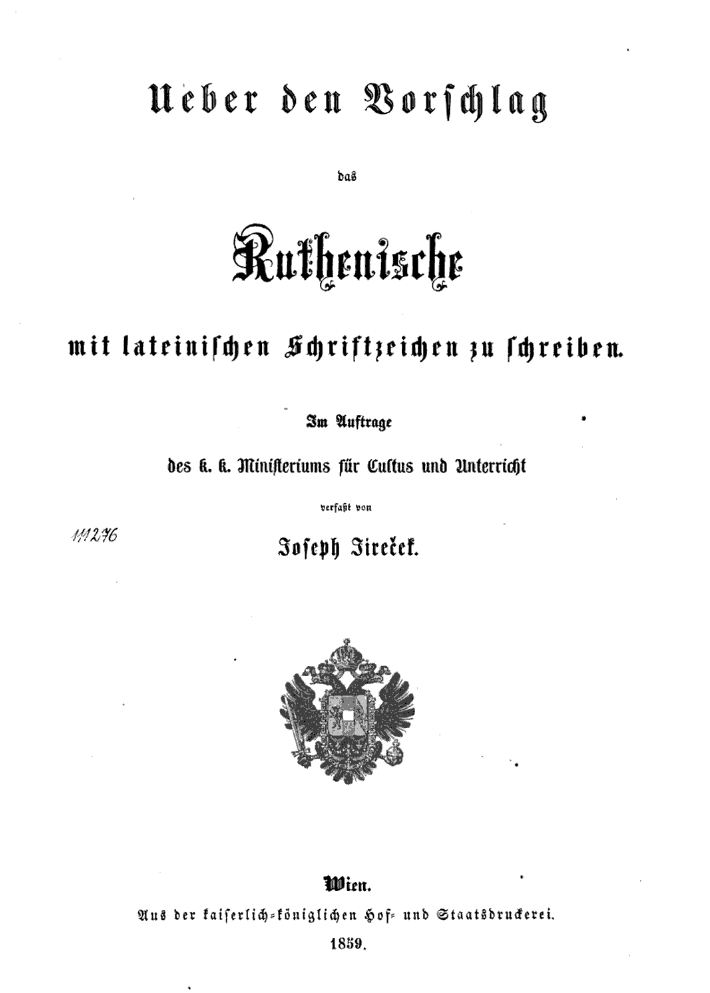
Jireček's "Proposal", published in 1859 in Vienna.

The second outbreak of the Alphabet War was caused by an attempt by the governor of Galicia Agenor Romuald Gołuchowski in 1859 to introduce a Latin alphabet, developed by the Czech philologist Josef Jireček on the basis of the Czech alphabet, into Galician schools.

Both Moscophiles (including Bohdan Dedyckiy) and intellectuals who initially spoke in favor of Jireček's project opposed the reform. Even Joseph Lozynskyi voted against the introduction of Latin, considering the change a politically and culturally harmful act for Ukrainians. Other opponents included the Greek Catholic Metropolitan of Lviv Spyrydon Lytvynovych. The protests were also supported by other Slavists from Austria, including Franz Miklosich and even Jireček's father-in-law, Pavel Šafárik. To counter allegations of inconsistency of the Church Slavonic script with the vernacular Ukrainian language, they proposed to reform the Cyrillic alphabet "like Karadžić," rather than replace it.

This wave of opposition was extremely strong among the intelligentsia, and a ministerial commission rejected the bill (7 votes to 2: two more abstained) in 1861. As a result, the Austrian Empire ended efforts to introduce the Latin script to Galicia.

However, not long afterward a decree was issued by the Kaiser on 10 April 1861, stating that the administration and courts of the Austrian Empire did not have to, but could use Cyrillic in Ukrainian-language documents. This permissive wording allowed the Galician imperial authority (staffed mostly by Poles) to resist using the Cyrillic alphabet even in Ukrainian-language documents.

== See also ==
- War of the Languages
