= Abecadło =

Lozynskyi's abecadło (/ˌɑːbɛˈtsɑːdloʊ/ ah-bet-SAHD-loh; Ukrainian: абецадло, Polish: abecadło) was a kind of Latin alphabet for the Ukrainian language, which was developed on the basis of the Polish alphabet and published in Galicia in 1834 by Joseph Lozynskyi. Lozynskyi proposed to adopt this alphabet instead of the Church Slavonic Cyrillic alphabet. The idea failed due to criticism from the Ukrainian Galician intelligentsia, including the Ruthenian Triad.

== History ==
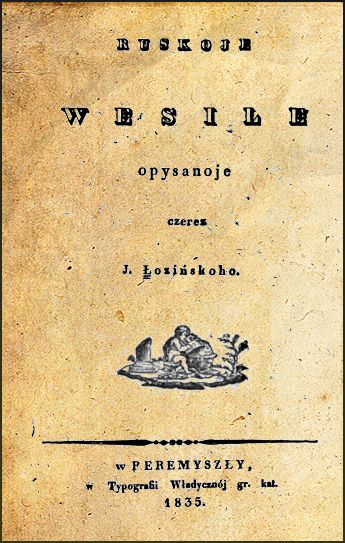
Lozynskyi's work "Ruskoje wesile", which became a presentation of his project in practice.

In 1834, Joseph Lozynskyi proposed the complete translation of the Ruthenian (Ukrainian) language into the Latin alphabet, writing an article on the introduction of the Polish alphabet to the Ruthenian alphabet (O wprowadzeniu abecadła polskiego do piśmiennictwa ruskiego) and elaborating (in Ukrainian) the manuscript the book "Ruskoje wesile" (1835). He based his alphabet on Polish spelling. Lozynskyi was not the first to express this idea: in the early 19th century. Schletzer suggested something similar in his work on Nestor the Chronicler, Josip Voltiggi in the Dictionary of Illyrian, Italian, and German, and a few years later Jernej Kopitar and A. Pachmayer.

Lozynsky's grammar was approved by Erney Kopitar, but neither its first nor the second edition was published. The reason for this in the first attempt of the publication was that Lozynskyi undertook new research, while the second edition was rejected by the Lviv censor Venedikt Levitsky. Lozynsky's grammar was an attempt to solve the problem of unsuitability of the Church Slavonic Cyrillic alphabet for the new literary Ukrainian language, which began to develop in the early 19th century, based on the vernacular. Despite the fact that some Ukrainian figures supported this idea (for example, Ivan Holovatsky, the brother of Yakov Holovatskyi), in general it did not gain wide recognition. In particular, Ukrainian cultural figures protested against this — the Ruthenian Triad (in particular, Markiian Shashkevych in the article "Azbuka and Abecadło"), Yosyp Levytskyi (the article Odpowiedź na zdanie o zaprowadzeniu abecadła polskiego do piśmiennictwa ruskiego).

Polish figures were also interested in adopting the Latin alphabet for Ruthenian writing. In 1836, Lucian Semensky's article "Literatura krajowa" appeared, in which the author defended Lozynsky's idea.

Lozynsky's project was called the "Abecadło" (from the Polish abecadło — the alphabet), and the controversy over the introduction of Ukrainian Latin — the "Alphabet War". Despite the failure of the idea of universal adoption of the alphabet for the Ukrainian language, it was sometimes used to print books in Ukrainian — both in Austria and later in interwar Poland, and even during World War II. In addition, in 1852, the Austrian Emperor Franz Joseph I ordered to respond to the appeal of Ukrainians in Ukrainian in the Latin alphabet of Lozynsky.

== Orthography ==
Lozynskyi's project was based mainly on the phonetic principle of spelling. However, it also had a number of etymological features.

The first of these are listed at the beginning of the book «Ruskoje wesile» in «Uwahach dla czytajuczych»:

1. The letter е́ is used, which is pronounced as /i/ (méd, nés, rék that reads like mid, nis, rik);
2. The letter о́ is used, which is pronounced as /і/ (Bóh, kóń, zlóśť, wón, stół, sposób, póznaty that reads like Bih, kiń, złyśť, win, stił, sposib, piznaty);
3. The letter ł means not only the solid /l/, but also /w/ (był, łapał, dół, horiłka, opysał, perekonał that reads like byw, łapaw, dyw, horiwka, opysaw, perekonaw).
4. Designation of assimilative palatalization: zlóśť, świt, świdok, świato, śpiwaje, widomóśť.
5. After the vowels /ji/ is not written, only i: twoi, swoi, moim, Ukraina, naródnyi, uroczystyi, kotryi.

== Alphabet ==
Lozynskyi based his alphabet on the Polish alphabet and several Czech and Slovak letters to denote consonants that are not softened in Polish: Ďď, R'r', Ťť.

Aa	Bb	Cc	Ćć	Czcz	Dd	Ďď	Ee	Éé
Ff	Gg	Hh	Ii	Jj	Kk	Ll	Łł	Mm
Nn	Ńń	Oo	Óó	Pp	Rr	R'r'	Ss	Śś
Szsz	Tt	Ťť	Uu	Ww	Yy	Zz	Źź	Żż

Digraphs

- я, є, ю, ї = ja, je, ju, ji
- x = ch, just like in Polish.
- dz, dź, dż.

== See also ==
- Alphabetical War
- Ukrainian Latin alphabet
- Polish orthography
