= Kanehl =

Kanehl (Kanehl the spice merchant, compare Muskat, Zimt, Safran and so on) is a surname. Notable people with the surname include:

- Oskar Kanehl (1888–1929), German poet and communist activist
- Rod Kanehl (1934–2004), American second baseman and outfielder

== See also ==
- Muscat (disambiguation)
- Muscat (surname)
