= Svitlana Pryzynchuk =

Ukrainian orientalist and art critic

- Призинчук Світлана Юріївна
- Born: April 21, 1989 (age 37)
- Education: Master
- Alma mater: Beijing Normal University, Kyiv International University
- Occupations: Orientalist, art critic, publisher
- Organization: Safran Publishing

Svitlana Pryzynchuk (Ukrainian: Призинчук Світлана Юріївна, Chinese: 施拉娜; pinyin: Shī lānà; born 21 April 1989) is a Ukrainian orientalist, art critic, and the founder of Safran Publishing.

== Biography ==
Svitlana Pryzynchuk was born on 21 April 1989. She is the only daughter of historian parents. The family speak Ukrainian, while her ancestors were Kulaks. The family has therefore experienced almost all the disasters that have occurred in Ukraine, including Holodomor. These family memories shaped Svitlana's Ukrainian identity from an early age. From childhood, Svitlana was fascinated by languages, literature, culture, and history. She initially wanted to be an archaeologist.

Pryzynchuk later studied international law and Chinese language at Kyiv International University, and was particularly interested in the latter. In her junior year of college, she became an exchange student at Tianjin University of Technology and Nankai University in China. After graduating, she pursued a master's degree in art history at Beijing Normal University. After six years of studying in China, Pryzynchuk earned her master's degree. Her thesis examined the influence of Wassily Kandinsky on Wu Guanzhong. She later learn Spanish in six months in Quito, Ecuador introduced by a friend.

Pryzynchuk returned to Ukraine in 2015. She considered starting a publisher during an internship at a publishing house, but dropped the idea during the Maidan Revolution. In 2016, she reconsidering her idea and noticed the lack of Ukrainian publications in Ukraine, especially Asian literature. As a result, she decided to start a publishing house that focuses on Asian publications in Ukrainian.

In 2018, Pryzynchuk established Safran Publishing. It was one of the few publishers focused on Asian publications. In 2019, Safran Publishing attended the Arsenal Book Festival with the flagship translation of Zhuangzi and The Classic of Tea. That same year, Zhuangzi was named one of the best books in 2019 by PEN Ukraine, while The Classic of Tea won a special prize at the Book Forum Lviv.
