= Safran Publishing =

Independent publisher in Ukraine

- Native name: Сафран
- Company type: Books
- Industry: Publishing industry
- Founded: 2018
- Headquarters: Kyiv, Ukraine
- Key people: Svitlana Pryzynchuk
- Products: Translating Asian publications
- Revenue: 4,552,900 hryvnia (2025)
- Total assets: 4,008,300 hryvnia (2025)
- Website: Official website

Safran Publishing (Ukrainian: Сафран) is a Ukrainian publishing house that was founded in 2018 by Svitlana Pryzynchuk. Safran translates Asian publications into Ukrainian. It is the first publishing house in Ukraine to focus on Asian publications. It primarily publishes classical literature, modern literature, and Asian comics. The company's translations received awards from PEN Ukraine and Book Forum Lviv.

== History ==
Svitlana Pryzynchuk developed the idea of publishing historical Asian works from earlier times. Her initial plan was to launch a magazine focused on Asia, distribute it in public spaces such as airports, and attract investment from Asian companies through advertising as the magazine's primary business model. It did not realise because the Maidan Revolution halted her idea. When Pryzynchuk rethought her idea of publishing in 2016, she noticed the lack of Ukrainian publications in Ukraine, especially Asian literature. She therefore decided to start a publishing house that focuses on Asian publications and researched various publishing houses in Europe.

Pryzynchuk established Safran Publishing in 2018, named after saffron, with the goal of "introducing Asian culture to Ukraine", and "bringing Ukraine into the world and foster global exchange". The company has some full-time staff, including a director and an accountant. The rest of the staff primarily work on a freelance basis, with each project consisting of an independent team chosen by the company. Translators are primarily experts in Oriental Studies, and will switch in each project. As of 2024, Safran Publishing has collaborated with 80 experts.

There are three core fields that Safran Publishing works on: classical literature, modern literature, and Asian comics, including manga, manhwa, and manhua. It mainly translates works that have not yet been translated into Ukrainian. The most popular fields are Taiwanese manhua and The Classic of Tea, while classical literature, modern literature, and non-fiction are relatively unpopular. Most readers are over 18 years old and have no background in Asia (such as doing business with Asian companies). Its book selection is primarily based on editorial preferences.

In 2019, Safran Publishing attended the Arsenal Book Festival with the flagship translation of Zhuangzi and The Classic of Tea. That same year, Zhuangzi was named one of the best books in 2019 by PEN Ukraine, while The Classic of Tea won a special prize at the Book Forum Lviv. At a book fair in that year, Pryzynchuk met Yu-Hsuan Hsu (徐裕軒), director of the Taiwan Trade Center in Kyiv. The meeting sparked her interest in Taiwanese literature, with the support of the Taiwanese government for translation projects. After translating The Stolen Bicycle by Wu Ming-yi, Pryzynchuk became interested in Guardienne by Nownow and began translating the work. Taiwanese manhua and Korean manhwa subsequently became the main focus of the company's translations.
