= Muskat =

Muskat (Muskat the spice merchant, compare Kanehl, Zimt, Safran and so on) is a surname. Notable people with the surname include:

- Joyce Muskat, American television writer
- Lisa Muskat, American film producer
- Morris Muskat (1906–1998), American petroleum engineer
- Tamir Muskat, Israeli musician

== See also ==
- Muscat (disambiguation)
- Muscat (surname)
