= Lviv International Literary Festival =

Ukrainian literary festival

The Lviv International Literary Festival (Litfest) is a literary and art festival which takes place each September since 1997 within the Lviv Publishers’ Forum. NGO "Publishers’ Forum" is the organizer. Over the years 536 writers from 38 countries have participated in it.

== History ==
- 1997 – The Literary Festival separates from the Forum. This Festival is very popular among the youth of Western Ukraine.
- 2001 – Foreign guests start to participate in the Literary Festival.
- 2006 – The Literary Festival becomes international.

== Focus themes of the Festival ==
Each year, a focus theme of the Festival is chosen. It unites a series of discussions and round-table meetings.

- 2006 – The Limits of Europe
- 2007 – Different Europes, Different Literatures
- 2008 – Literature in the Epoch of Mass-Media
- 2009 – Modern Literature: National vs Global
- 2010 – The Dialogue between Generations
- 2011 – Ukrainian Book Publishing Industry during the Crisis: the Time for Changes
- 2012 – Journeys to Literature
- 2013 – Women in the World That Changes
- 2014 – The Short 20th Century – the Great Epoch

== Main events ==
- Contest and Festival “Young Republic of Poets”
- Night of poetry and music
- TRANSLIT international translation festival
- CONTEXT festival of cultural management and literary criticism

Over the years, 1200 events were held within the Festival. 313 events were held within the 8th Lviv International Literary Festival (2013)

Each year, the Festival issues an almanac. Thematic texts and excerpts from the works of the participants are published in it. The almanac is distributed among libraries, foundations, cultural centers.

== Participants ==
The most famous foreign participants:

- Jostein Gaarder
- Zygmunt Bauman
- Janusz Leon Wiśniewski
- Janet Paisley
- Danuta Wałęsa
- Olga Tokarczuk
- Martin Pollack
- Erlend Loe
- Marek Krajewski
- Adam Michnik
- Lev Rubinstein
- Tatyana Tolstaya
- Terézia Mora
- Anna "Umka" Gerasimova
- Jeremy Strong
- Linor Goralik
