= Yakiv Holovatsky =

Galician historian and literary scholar

- Яків Головацький
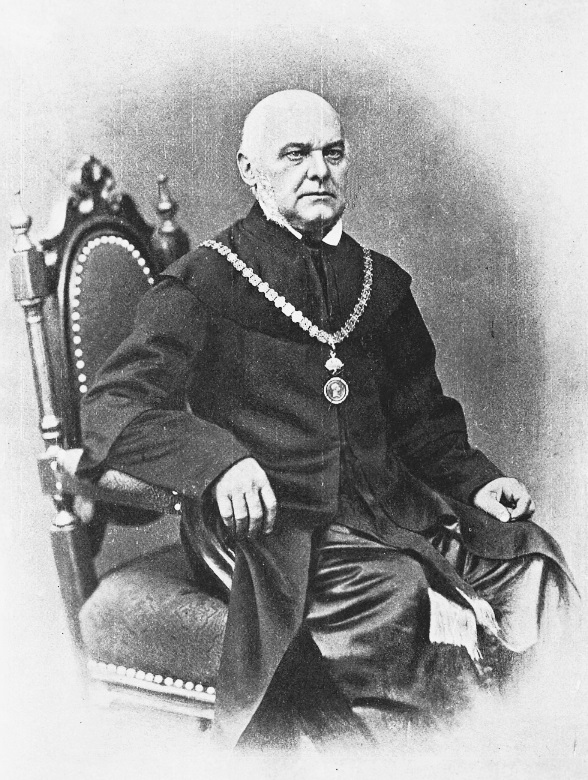
- Holovatsky in 1864
- Born: 17 October 1814; Chepeli, Kingdom of Galicia and Lodomeria, Austrian Empire
- Died: 13 May 1888 (aged 73); Vilna, Vilna Governorate, Russian Empire
- Citizenship: Austria-Hungary
- Education: Theological Seminary (Lviv)
- Alma mater: University of Lviv (1841)
- Occupations: historian, literary scholar, ethnographer, linguist, bibliographer, lexicographer, poet, priest, and pedagogue
- Writing career
- Pen name: Havrylo Rusyn
- Notable works: The Dniester Nymph, 1836
- Movements: Ruthenian Triad, later Pan-Slavism

Yakiv Holovatsky (Ukrainian: Яків Головацький, Russian: Яков Головацкий, romanized: Yakov Golovatsky; 17 October 1814 – 13 May 1888) was a Galician historian, literary scholar, ethnographer, linguist, bibliographer, lexicographer, poet and leader of Galician Russophiles. He was a member of the Ruthenian Triad, one of the most influential Ukrainian literary groups in the Austrian Empire.

== Biography ==
Holovatsky was born in Chepeli, to a family of a priest Fedir Holovatsky (Hlavatsky) whose heritage takes roots in the city of Mykolaiv (today in Lviv Oblast). Ivan Holovatsky, grandfather of Yakiv, was a szlachtycz of the Polish Prus coat of arms family and burg-minister of Mykolaiv. Yakiv's mother Fekla Yakymovych also was from the family of a priest in Tur, Zloczow powiat.

He received his education in Lviv, where he later enrolled in the Theological Seminary at the University of Lviv. As a student he traversed Galicia, Bukovina, and Transcarpathia collecting folk songs.

In 1832, at Lviv University he formed the Ruthenian Triad (Ruska Triitsia) with Markiyan Shashkevych, and Ivan Vahylevych, and played an important role in the Ukrainian national revival in Galicia. The three published the first Halych almanac in the vernacular language, Rusalka Dnistrovaia (The Dniester Nymph, 1836), with included several of Holovatsky's poems. In 1946–47 he published Vinok rusynam na obzhynky (A Garland for Ruthenians at the Harvest Feast), an anthology of 20 Serbian songs in Ukrainian translation.

In 1842 he became a Greek Catholic priest and later received an appointment to the village of Mykytyntsi near Kolomyia. Due to the Revolution of 1848, he was appointed the first professor of Ruthenian (Ukrainian) philology and literature at Lviv University, where he lectured from 1848 to 1867. Holovatsky served as rector (rector magnificus) of the university from 1864 to 1866.

When Austria began to support Galician Poles in political reaction, disillusioned and influenced by Mikhail Pogodin's Pan-Slavist ideas, Holovatsky adopted a Russophile attitude in the 1850s. Dismissed from the university for his views, in 1867 he moved to Russian-ruled Vilnius to head the archaeographic commission there. The most important work among his ethnographic and literary studies was Narodnye pesni Galitskoi i Ugorskoi Rusi (Folk Songs of Galician and Hungarian Ruthenia, 4 vv, 1878).
