= Muscat (disambiguation) =

Muscat is the capital and largest city of Oman.

Muscat may also refer to:

== Places in Oman ==
- Muscat Governorate, the region of Oman which includes the capital city
  - Muscat District of Muscat Governorate.
  - Muscat Securities Market, the stock exchange in Oman
  - Muscat International Airport
  - Muscat (football club), a football club in Oman
- Muscat and Oman, the predecessor state of Oman
- Old Muscat, the historic city of Muscat in Oman

== Other uses ==
- Muscat (surname), a Maltese surname
- Muscat (grape), a variety of grape used for wine, table grapes, and raisins
- Muscat Stadium, a Japanese baseball stadium
- Muscats Motors, a car dealership in Malta
- Muscat (film), a Canadian short drama film

== See also ==
- Muskat, a surname
- Maskut, the historic tribes of the Caucasus
