= Ivan Vahylevych =

Ukrainian Romantic poet, philologist, and ethnographer

- Іван Миколайович Вагилевич
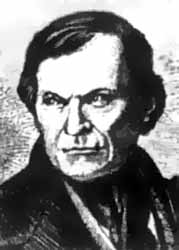
- Born: 2 September 1811; Yasen, Kingdom of Galicia and Lodomeria
- Died: 10 May 1866 (aged 54); Lemberg, Kingdom of Galicia and Lodomeria
- Citizenship: Austrian Empire
- Education: University of Lviv
- Occupations: Poet, philologist, ethnographer, public activist
- Writing career
- Pen name: Dalybor Vahylevych
- Notable works: The Dniester Nymph, 1836
- Movement: Ruthenian Triad

Ivan Mykolaiovych Vahylevych (Ukrainian: Іван Миколайович Вагилевич) or Jan Wagilewicz (2 September 1811 – 10 May 1866) was a Ukrainian Romantic poet, philologist, and ethnographer of the Galician revival in Western Ukraine.

== Biography ==
Ivan Vahylevych was born in 1811 in Yasen, near Stanislaviv, into the family of a Greek Catholic priest.

While studying at University of Lviv and at the Greek Catholic Theological Seminary in Lviv, he associated with Markiyan Shashkevych and Yakiv Holovatsky, and the three of them formed the Ruthenian Triad. Together with them, he co-created the almanac Русалка днєстровая / Ruthenische Volks-Lieder, published in 1837. Vahylevych neglected his studies at the university frequently in order to make field trips to villages in western Ukraine, where he conducted archaeological and ethnographic fieldwork. He completed the seminary in 1839, but was not ordained until 1846.

Because of his populist activities, cultural nationalist views, and correspondence with scholars in the Russian Empire, namely Mikhail Pogodin, Izmail Sreznevsky, and the Ukrainians Mykhailo Maksymovych and Osyp Bodiansky, he suffered harassment by the church and Austrian civil authorities.Vahylevych considered himself Ukrainian and devoted most of his life to researching and collecting Ukrainian folklore, language, and history. He viewed Ukrainian identity within the broader context of Slavic culture and is often described as a Slavophile.

He served as a pastor in Nestanychi for a while. During the Revolution of 1848–1849 in the Habsburg monarchy he supported a democratic Polish-Ukrainian political federation. Being a democratic Polish-Ukrainian political federation sympathizer, he took up the editorship of Dnewnyk Ruskij, the weekly run by the Ruthenian sobor, written in the Ruthenian language using Latin letters.

Later that year he left the Ukrainian Greek Catholic Church in protest against the church hierarchy's sanctions against him and converted to Lutheranism. In 1851, he worked as curator of the Ossoliński Library in Lviv, then from 1862 to 1864 as scientific director of the Lviv City Archives. He died in poverty in 1866. In his final years, he lived in a small house on a side street off Zielona Street, which was named after him after his death. The location of his grave is uncertain. The monument standing in the Lychakiv Cemetery, erected only in 1987, is symbolic in nature.

== Literary works ==
In 1836, he co-edited Русалка днєстровая / Ruthenische Volks-Lieder, the first Galician Ukrainian almanac. He published in the journals such as Časopis českého Museum, Biblioteka Naukowego Zakładu im. Ossolińskich and Москвитянин, and many others mainly Polish and Russians.

Vahylevych was also involved in Polish cultural life. He collaborated with August Bielowski on Monumenta Poloniae Historica, among other things by translating and annotating the Primary Chronicle. Together with him, he co-edited the second edition of Linde’s Dictionary of the Polish Language. He was also a co-editor of Castle and land acts from the times of the Polish Commonwealth. He also wrote in Polish Demonologia and Slavic Symbolism, though these works were never published.

In fact, many of Vahylevych’s works either remained unpublished or unfinished. It is known that he worked on collections of Ruthenian songs, a dictionary of that language, and studies in Slavic mythology and demonology.

Among his published works, apart from articles, one should mention: Grammar of the Little Russian Language in Galicia (1845, in Polish) and The Skete Monastery in Manyava (1848, in Polish). In 1996, his Polish manuscript of Polish Writers of Ruthenian Origin, along with the supplement Latin Writers of Ruthenian Origin, was published in Przemyśl.

== Commemoration ==
In 1995, a museum dedicated to him was established in his hometown of Vagilevich. Streets named after him can be found in most Ukrainian cities.

== See also ==
- Ukrainian literature
- Revolutions of 1848 in the Habsburg areas
