= Josip Voltiggi =

Josip Voltiggi or Josip Voltić (1750–1825) was a Venetian linguist from Istria.

In 1803, he published his Grammatica illirica, in Ricoslovnik illiricskoga, italianskoga i nimacskoga jezika s’ jednom pridpostavljenomm grammatikom illi pismenstvom: sve ovo sabrano i sloxeno od Jose Voltiggi Istranina (A dictionary of the Illyrian, Italian and German languages with a grammar and orthography), in Vienna.

Because of his Pan-Slavic views, he was subject to harassment from the Austrian police. He died in a hospital and in great poverty.

== Sources ==
- Viktor Novak: Vuk i Hrvati (Vuk and the Croats)
