= Bohdan Dedyckiy =

Ukrainian Muscovite writer (b. 1827, d. 1908)

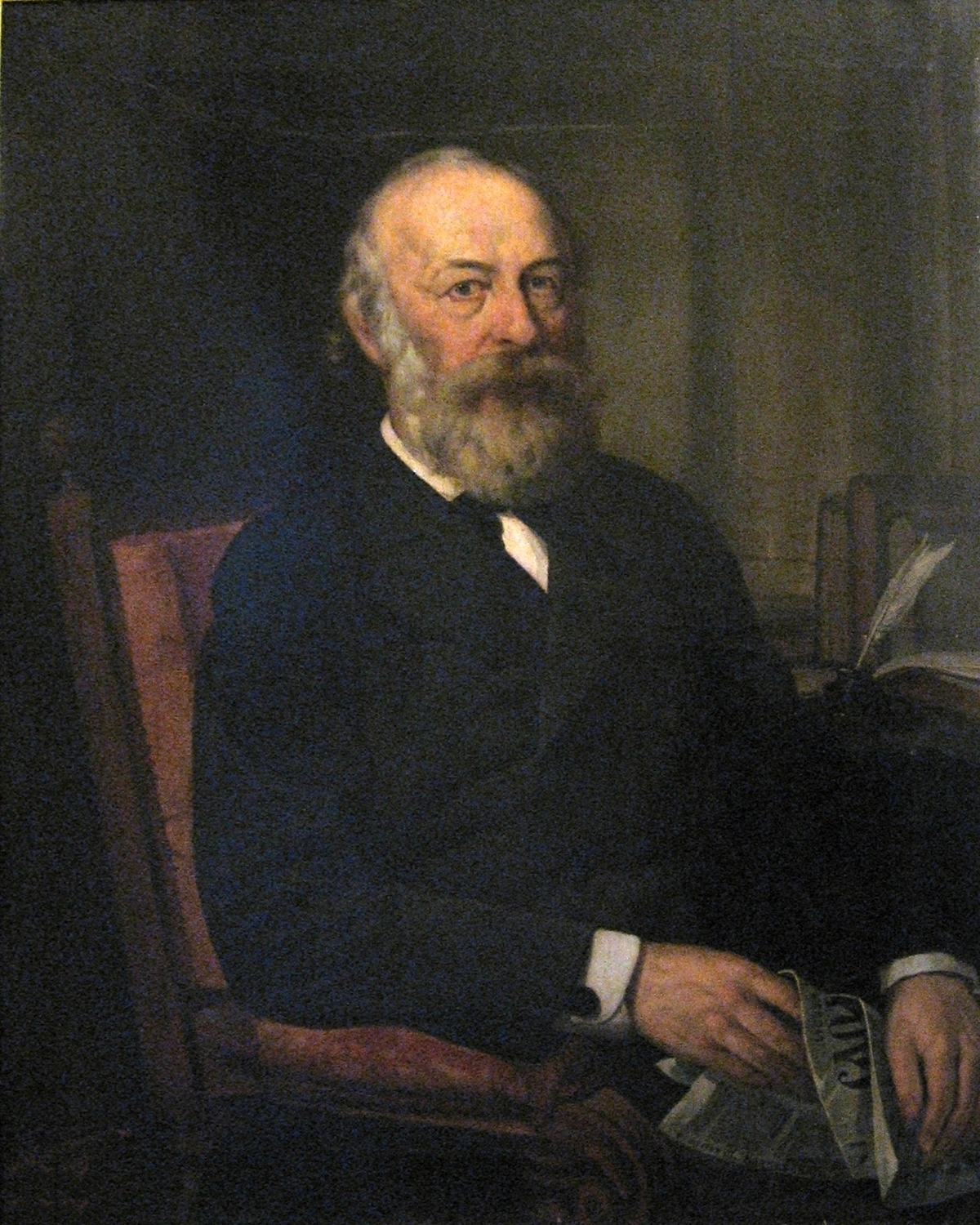
- Bohdan Dedyckiy 1889 by Teofil Kopystynski 1844-1916
- Born: 1827
- Died: 1908 (aged 80–81)
- Resting place: Lychakiv Cemetery, Lviv
- Occupations: Writer, poet, journalist
- Known for: Editor of Słowo and Zoria Hałyćka newspapers

Bohdan Dedyckiy (1827–1908) was a Ukrainian Moscophile writer, poet and journalist from Galicia.

He was the editor of the "Słowo" and "Zoria Hałyćka" newspapers. He promoted the view that there is only one Russian language, with two pronunciations - Russian and Ukrainian, and denied the existence of a separate Ukrainian language.

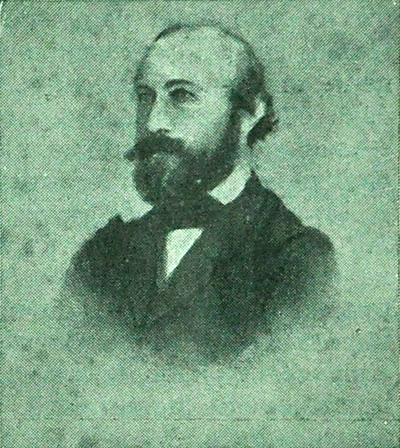
Bohdan Dedyckiy

He published in iazychie, in the same dialect, he published an anonymous brochure in 1866 in Lviv: "W odin czas nauczitsja małorusinu po wełykoruski". He was of the opinion that in this way the knowledge of Russian literature would become popular among the Galician Rusyns (Ukrainians).

Bohdan Dedyckiy is buried at the Lychakiv Cemetery in Lviv, in the Russian journalists Bed of Honor.

== Bibliography ==
- Енциклопедія українознавства, Lviv 1993, t. 2, s. 520
