= Safran (disambiguation) =

Safran is a French conglomerate involved in defense, aerospace propulsion and equipment.

Safran, Sáfrán and Şafran may also refer to:

== People with the surname ==
- Alexandru Șafran (1910–2006), Romanian and Swiss rabbi
- Don Safran (1930–2014), American film and television screenwriter, producer and marketing executive
- Hannah Safran (born 1950), Israeli feminist, activist and researcher
- Henri Safran (born 1932), French-born Australian television director
- Jeremy D. Safran (1952–2018), Canadian-American clinical psychologist
- John Safran (born 1972), Australian documentary maker and media personality
- Jonathan Safran Foer (born 1977), American writer
- Joshua Safran (active 2014), American television producer and writer
- Mátyás Sáfrán (born 1986), Hungarian sprint canoer
- Mihály Sáfrán (born 1985), Hungarian sprint canoer
- Nadav Safran (1925–2003), Egyptian expert in Arab and Middle East politics
- Naomi Safran-Hon (born 1984), Israeli artist
- Peter Safran (born 1965), American film producer and manager
- Roald Safran (birth name of Roald Hoffmann, born 1937), American theoretical chemist
- Scott Safran (1967–1989), American video gamer
- William Safran (1930–2026), German-born American academic in political science

== Businesses ==
- Safran Publishing, a Ukrainian publisher translating Asian publications

== See also ==
- Saffron, a spice
- Renault Safrane, an executive car manufactured 1992–2000
- Safran SR305-230, a diesel piston aircraft engine manufactured by SMA Engines
