= Muscat (surname) =

Muscat is a fairly common surname among people of Maltese descent. The following people have the surname Muscat:

== Arts and entertainment ==
- Angelo Muscat (1930–1977), Maltese actor
- Brent Muscat (b. 1967), American rock guitarist
- Emma Muscat (b. 1999), Maltese singer and model, represented Malta in the Eurovision Song Contest 2022
- Jessika Muscat (b. 1989), Maltese singer and actress, represented San Marino in the Eurovision Song Contest 2018
- Mike Muscat (b. 1952), American actor

== Politics ==
- Joseph Muscat (b. 1974), former Prime Minister of Malta
- Josie Muscat (b. 1943), Maltese politician

== Sport ==
- Alex Muscat (b. 1984), Maltese footballer
- Carmel Muscat (1961–2025), Maltese cyclist
- Charles Muscat (1963–2011), Maltese footballer
- Kevin Muscat (b. 1973), Australian football coach
- Manny Muscat (b. 1984), Maltese-Australian footballer
- Mario Muscat (b. 1976), Maltese footballer
- Nicola Muscat (b. 1994), Maltese swimmer
- Richard Muscat (b. 1992), Australian motor-racing driver
- Rowen Muscat (b. 1991), Maltese footballer
- Zach Muscat (b. 1993), Maltese footballer

== Other fields ==
- John Nicholas Muscat (1735–c.1800), Maltese philosopher

== See also ==
- Ġużè Muscat Azzopardi (1853–1927), Maltese writer and lawyer
- Muskat
