= Arsenal Book Festival =

Ukrainian book festival

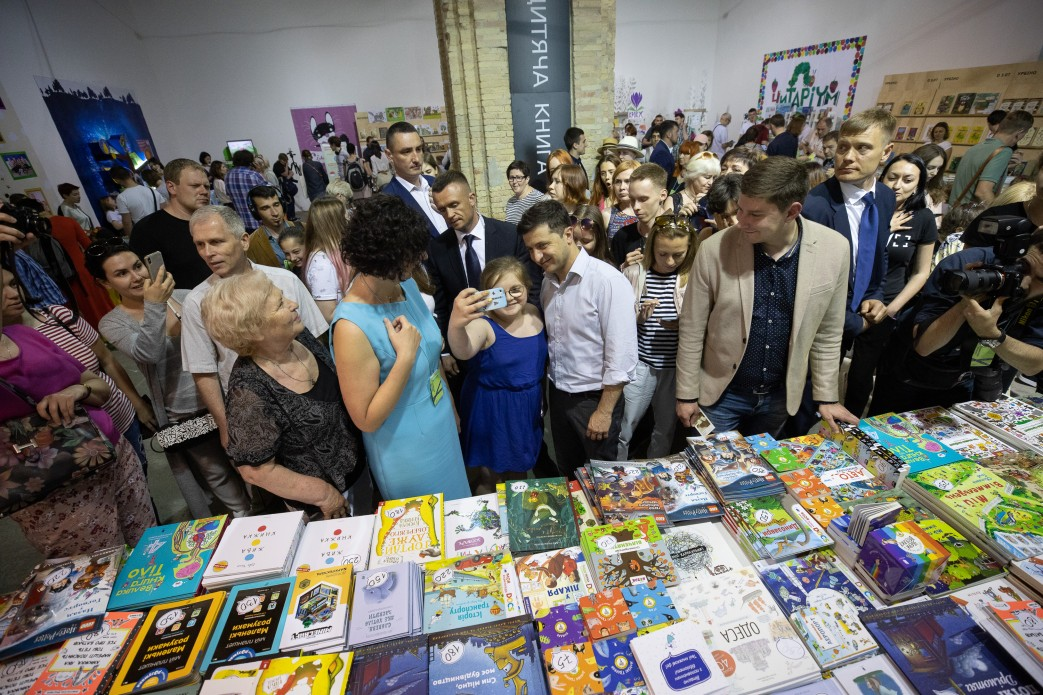
- Volodymyr Zelenskyy visiting Book Arsenal in 2019
- Status: Active
- Genre: Book fair
- Location: Kyiv
- Country: Ukraine
- Inaugurated: 1994; 32 years ago
- Organiser: Mystetskyi Arsenal
- Website: Official website

The International Arsenal Book Festival takes place annually in spring in Kyiv, Ukraine. It is a nationwide event founded by Mystetskyi Arsenal and was first held from May 28 to June 1, 2011, being curated by Olha Zhuk.

== Festival ==
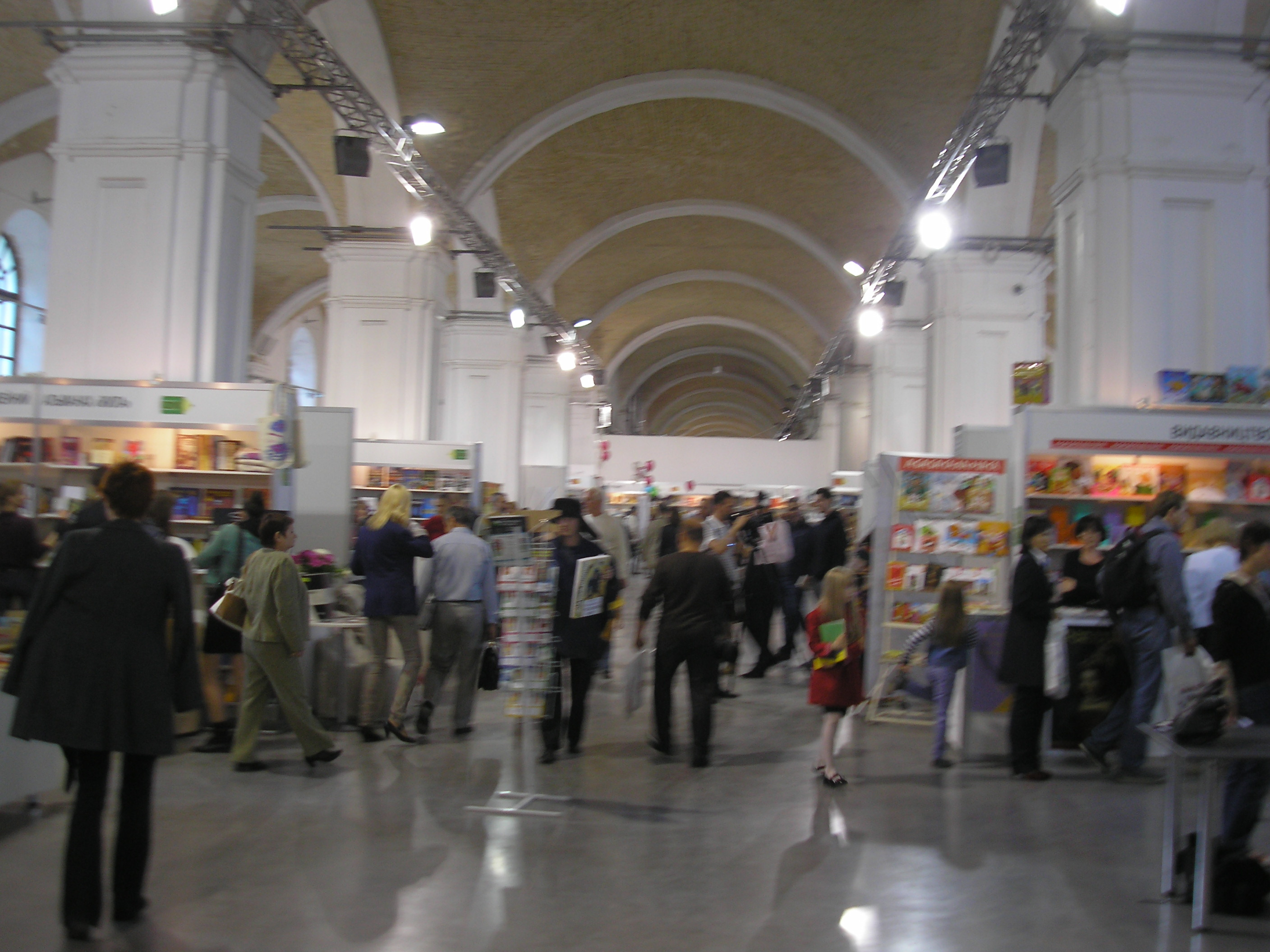
Opening of the Arsenal Book Festival in 2013

The Arsenal Book Festival is a fair intended for artists and writers. It is reported that more than 150 Ukrainian publishers attend yearly for presentations, and that more than 500 writers and artists of different disciplines from over 50 countries have attended.

=== Themes ===
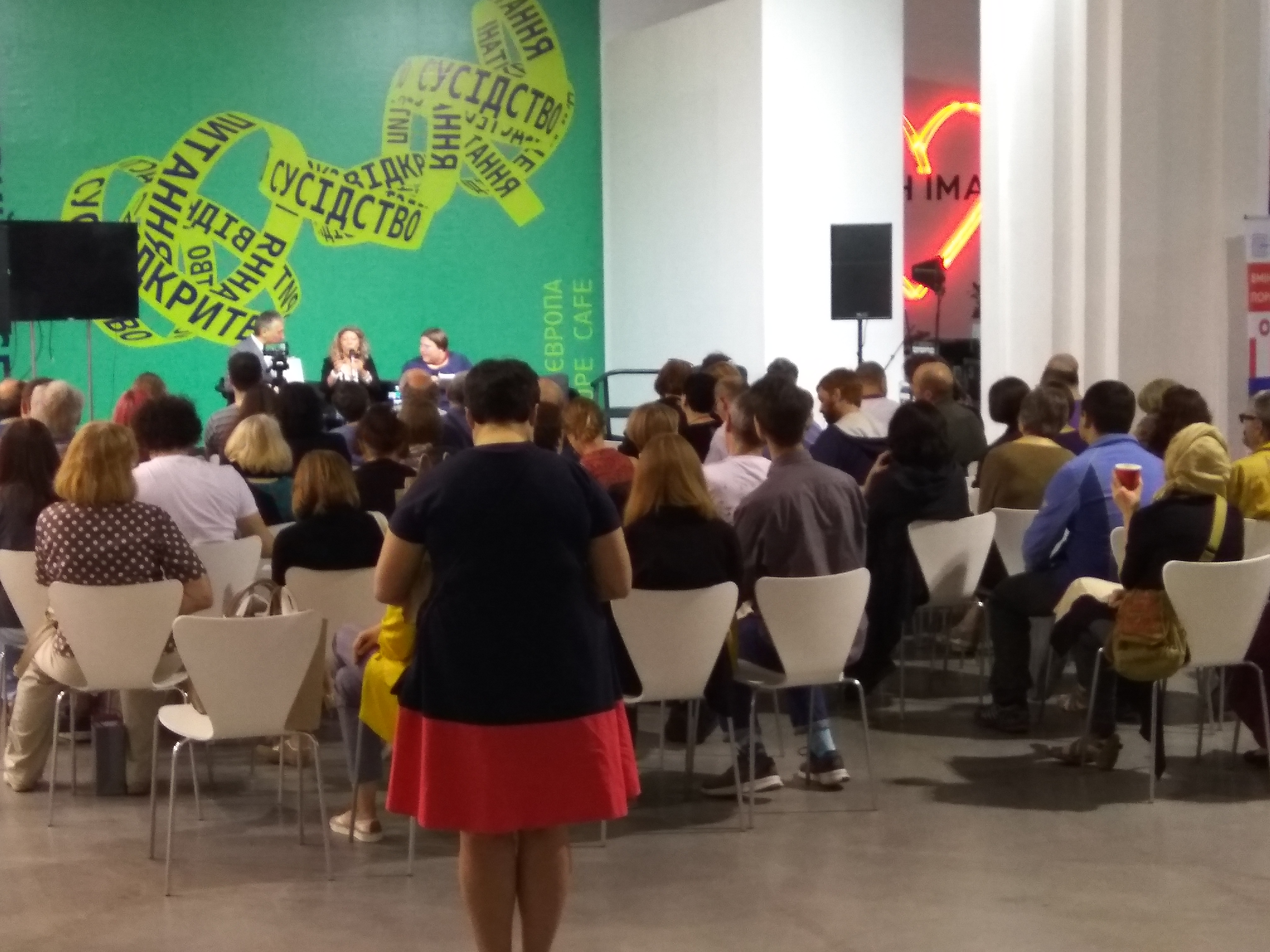
Presentation in the 2019 festival

Beginning in 2017, organizers have selected an intended theme for entries to focus on and discuss.

In 2017, the theme "Laughter. Fear. Power" was chosen in response to the 175th anniversary of the publication of "Eneyida" by Ivan Kotlyarevskyi’, and the festival was curated by Tetyana Terekhova.

In 2018, the theme "The Project of Future" was chosen and the festival was curated by Vira Baldyniuk.

In 2019 the theme "Neighborhood: Open Discussion" was chosen and the festival was curated by Vira Baldyniuk.

The theme "Optimist Skeptics" was chosen for the 2020 festival to be curated Rostyslav Semkiv. However, due to the COVID-19 pandemic, the 10th festival was postponed until May 26 through 30th of 2021.

== See also ==
- Book Forum Lviv
