= Ruthenian Triad =

19th-century Galician literary group

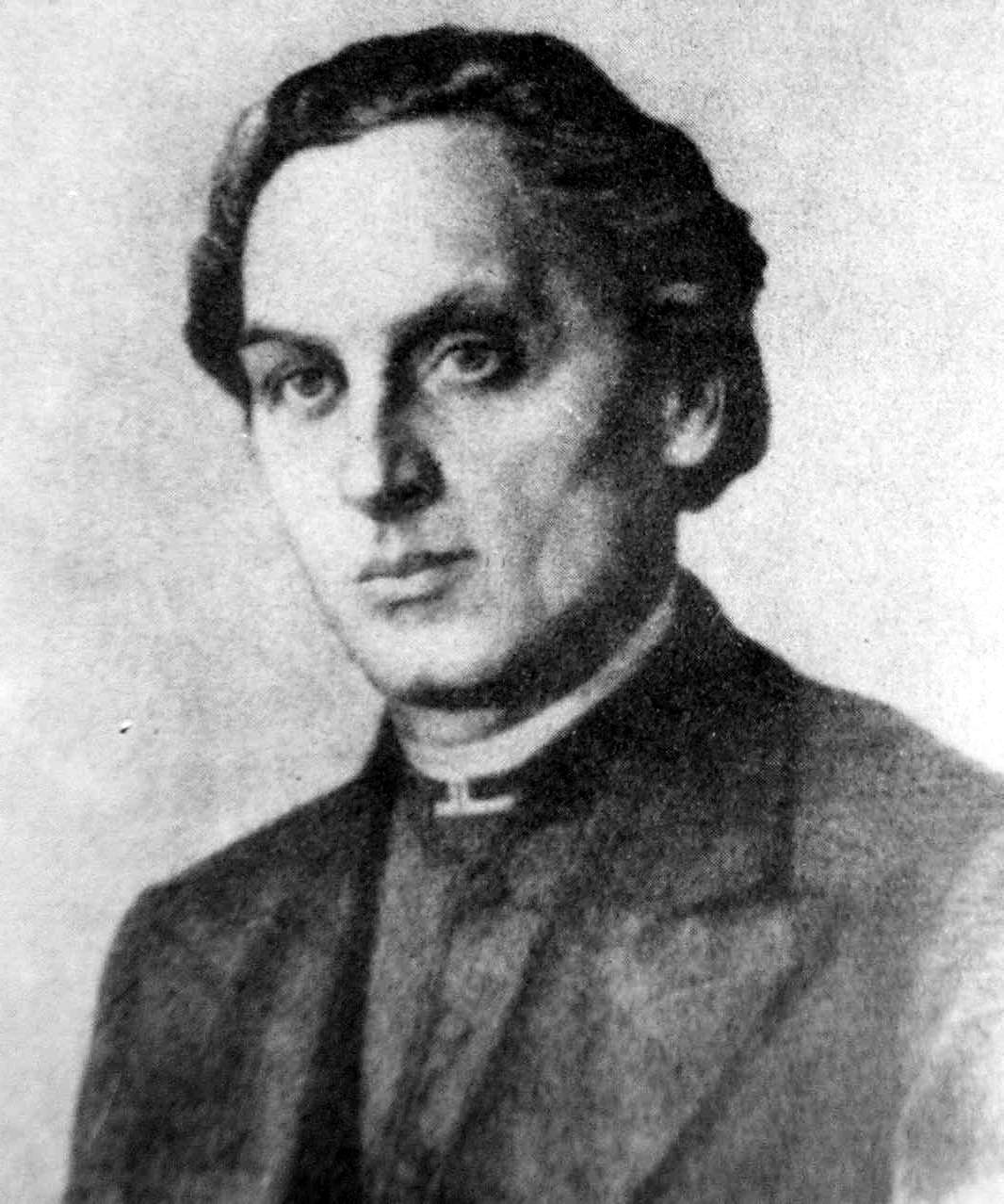
Markiyan Shashkevych (1811-1843)

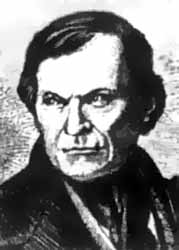
Ivan Vahylevych
(1811-1866)

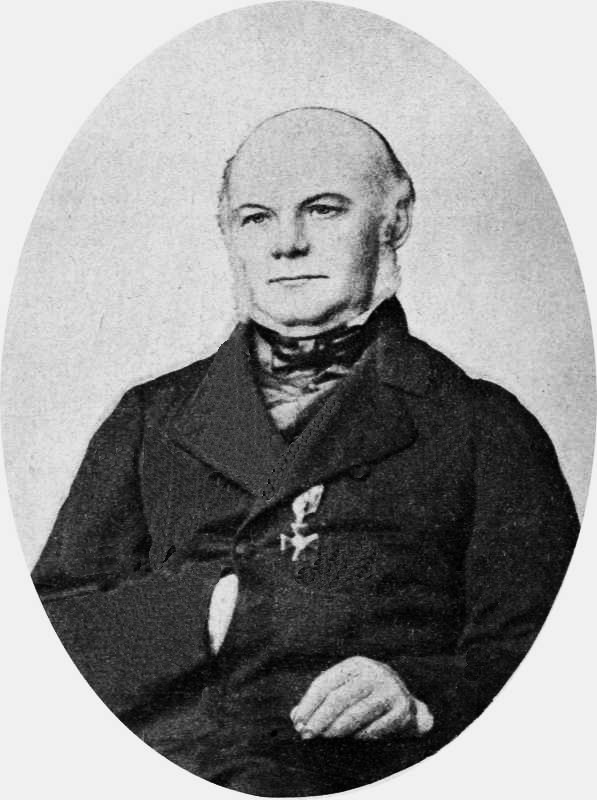
Yakiv Holovatskyi
(1814-1888)

The Ruthenian Trinity (Ruthenian: Руська троица; Ukrainian: Руська трійця, romanized: Ruska triitsia) was a Galician literary group led by Markiian Shashkevych, Yakiv Holovatskyi, and Ivan Vahylevych, which began a national and cultural revival in the western Ukrainian lands in the early-to-mid 19th century (1833–1837). They were representatives of Romantic nationalism in Ukraine and played a crucial role in the development of Ukrainian nationalism. The three all first met as students at the Greek Catholic Theological Seminary in Lviv. They also represented Galician Russophilia, and supported union with Russia.

== Overview ==
The group formed during the romantic period. It focused on folklore and history. It also aimed for pan-Slavic unity. The members used Old Slavic pseudonyms. Shashkevych was called Ruslan. Vahylevych was Dalybor. Holovatsky was Yaroslav.

The group attracted young supporters. They wanted to help their community. Some members joined Polish revolutionary groups. Others collected folk stories and studied Ukrainian history. They also translated Slavic works and wrote their own.

The group believed in a unified Ukrainian identity. They said the Ruthenians of Galicia, Bukovyna, and Transcarpathia were one people. They had their own language and culture. The group was inspired by Ukrainians under Russian rule. They looked up to works by Ivan Kotliarevskyi and others.

The Triad tried to publish their works. Their first two collections were not published. These were Syn Rusi ("Sons of Russia") in 1833 and Zoria in 1834. Their third collection, Rusalka Dnistrovaia ("Mermaid of the Dniester"), was published in 1836 in Budapest. Most copies were taken away soon after.

In 1834, the Ruthenian Triad attempted to publish a folklore and literary collection, Zora, in which folk songs, works by members of the group, and materials condemning foreign oppression and glorifying the heroic struggle of Ukrainians for their liberation were to be published. However, censorship banned its publication, and the compilers of the collection were closely monitored by the police.

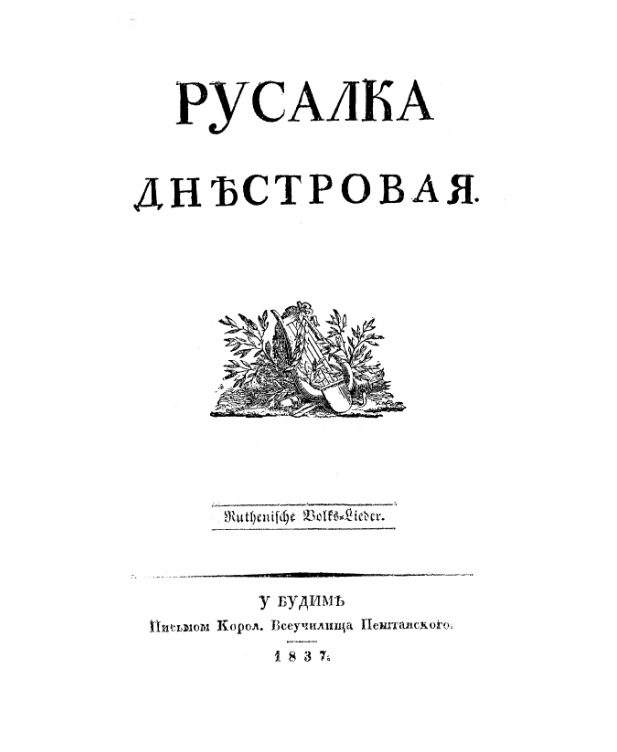
Cover of Rusalka Dnistrovaia

A significant merit of the Ruthenian Triad was the publication of the almanac Rusalka Dnistrovaia (Buda, now Budapest, 1837), which, instead of Iazychie, introduced a living vernacular in Galicia, starting a new Ukrainian literature there. The idea of Slavic reciprocity permeated by the Dniester Mermaid is related to Kollar's poem Slavy dcera (1824), which greatly inspired the activities of the Ruthenian Triad. Czech Slavist Jan Kovbek also had.

Rusalka Dnistrovaia was banned by the Austrian government. Only 200 out of 1,000 copies were sold, given to friends and kept for themselves, the rest were confiscated.

The Ruthenian Triad group ceased its activities in 1843 after the death of Shashkevych.

The collection was important. It used spoken Ukrainian language. This was new for literature in Austria-Hungary. The Triad's work had similarities with Jan Kollár's sonnets. Kollár's collection was Slávy dcera.

The Ruthenian Triad is important in Ukrainian literature. They helped develop a Ukrainian national identity. They also promoted the use of Ukrainian language in literature.

== Honoring the memory ==
- On January 1, 2012, the world's first monument to the Ruthenian Trinity was unveiled in Ivano-Frankivsk (sculptor Volodymyr Dovbeniuk).
- On July 30, 2015, in the same Ivano-Frankivsk square, where this monument stands, it was renamed the Ruthenian Trinity Square.
- In the same city of Ivano-Frankivsk there are also Markiian Shashkevych Street and Ivan Vahylevych Street.

== Further reading (in Ukrainian) ==
- Енциклопедія українознавства : Словникова частина : [в 11 т.] / Наукове товариство імені Шевченка ; гол. ред. проф., д-р Володимир Кубійович. — Париж—Нью-Йорк : Молоде життя, 1955–1995.
- Франко І. Нарис історії українсько-руської літератури до 1890 р. / І. Франко. — Львів : Накладом Укр.-рус. вид. спілки, 1910. — V, 444 c.
- Маркіян Шашкевич на Заході / упоряд., ред. і вступ Я. Розумний. — Вінніпег: Інститут-Заповідник Маркіяна Шашкевича, 2007. — 383 с.
- Шах С. О. Маркіян Шашкевич і галицьке відродження. — Париж-Мюнхен, 1961.
- М. Шашкевич, І. Вагилевич, Я. Головацький: бібліографічний покажчик / укл.: М. П. Гуменюк, Є. Є. Кравченко. — Львів : Львівська бібліотека Академії наук Української РСР, 1962. — 132 с.
- Марунчак<span typeof="mw:Entity" id="mwbA">&nbsp;</span>М. Маркіян Шашкевич на тлі доби. — Вінніпеґ : Загальна Бібліотека «УКТ», 1962. — 96 с.
- Луців Л. Маркіян Шашкевич. — Нью-Йорк : в-во «Свобода», 1963. — 118 с.
- Історія української літератури: у восьми томах / голова редколегії — Є. Кирилюк. — т. II. — К. : Наукова думка, 1967.
- Стеблій Ф. І. Руська трійця // Енциклопедія історії України : у 10 т. / редкол.: В. А. Смолій (голова) та ін. ; Інститут історії України НАН України. — К. : Наукова думка, 2012. — Т. 9 : Прил — С. — С. 395. — 944 с. : іл. — ISBN 978-966-00-1290-5
- Kozik J. Ukraiński ruch narodowy w Galicji w latach 1830–1848. — Kraków, 1973. (пол.)
