= Markiian Shashkevych =

Ukrainian journalist and writer

- Маркіян Шашкевич
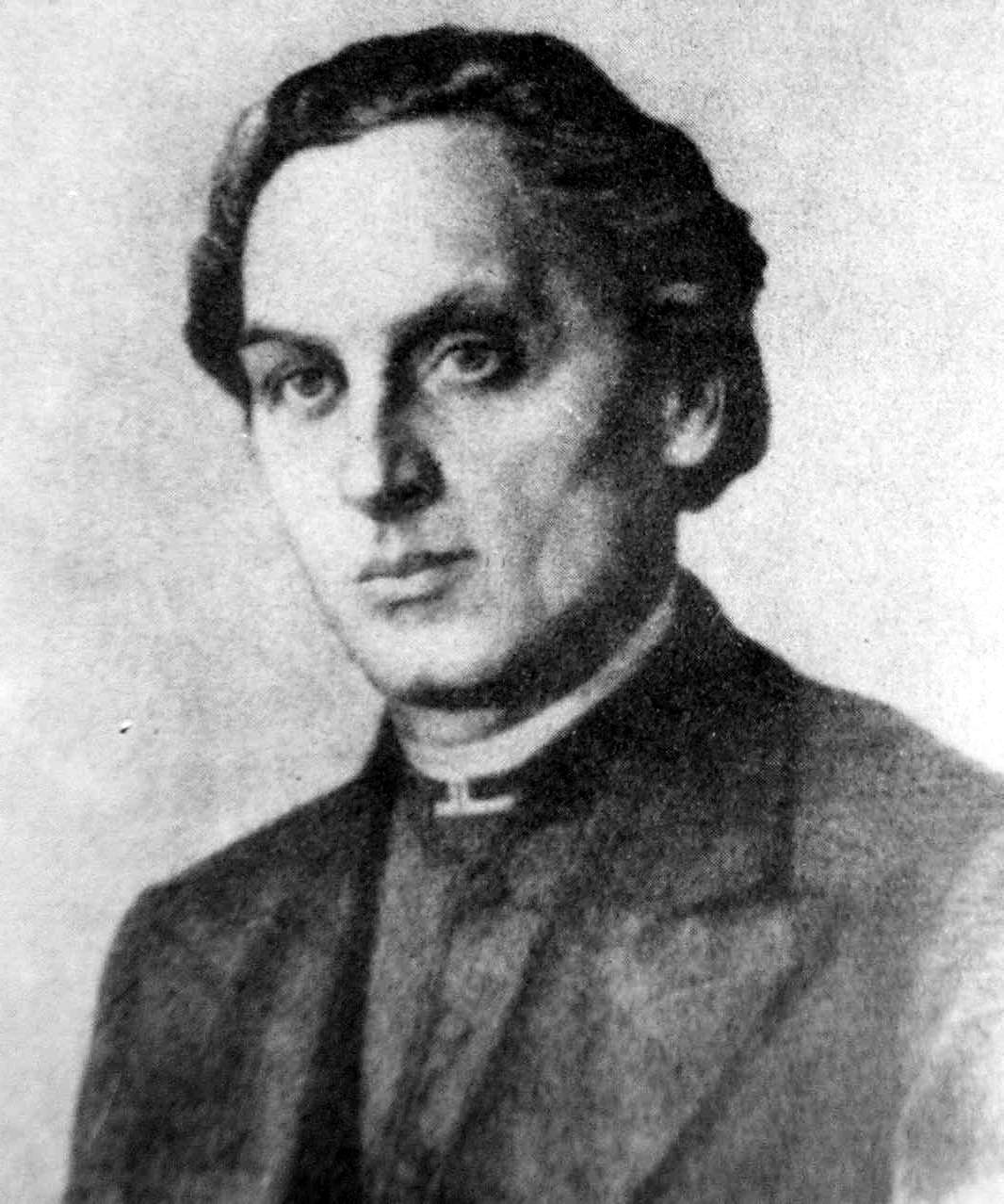
- Pencil portrait of Shashkevych by Ivan Trush
- Born: November 6, 1811; Pidlyssia, Kingdom of Galicia and Lodomeria
- Died: June 7, 1843 (aged 31); Novosilky, Kingdom of Galicia and Lodomeria
- Citizenship: Austrian Empire
- Education: Greek Catholic Theological Seminary
- Alma mater: University of Lemberg (1838)
- Occupations: writer, poet, priest, translator
- Writing career
- Genre: vernacular folklore
- Literary movement: Ruthenian Triad

Markiian Semenovych Shashkevych (Ukrainian: Маркіян Семенович Шашкевич; November 6, 1811 – June 7, 1843) was a priest of the Ukrainian Greek Catholic Church, a poet, a translator, and the leader of the literary revival in Western Ukraine.

Shashkevych's parents were Simon Shaskevych (Szaszkiewicz) and Elizabeth Audykowska, who was the daughter of Rev. Romanus Audykowski, the Greek Catholic parish priest in Pidlyssia. In 1832, Shashkevych and fellow students organized a group aimed at the rise of the Ukrainian dialect free of Church Slavonic and alien 'styles' up to the literary language. He graduated from the Greek Catholic Theological Seminary at University of Lviv in 1838 and worked as a priest in the rural Lwow powiat. During his studies he met Yakiv Holovatsky and Ivan Vahylevych, with whom he formed the Ruthenian Triad (aka Ruska Triitsia).

The activities of the Shashkevych circle constituted not only a literary phenomenon, but a social and democratic movement. Its greatest achievement was the publication of an almanac entitled Rusalka Dnistrovaia ('The Mermaid of the Dniester', 1837), which was the first collection of Ukrainian literature to appear in Western Ukraine. However, the publication was immediately banned by Austrian authorities, and Shashkevych himself received a death sentence from his fellow seminary students. Although this threat was never realized, the compromised clergyman lost his chance to seek a better parish and spent the rest of his days in poverty.

Along with Rusalka Dnistrovaia, during his short life Shashkevych made several other important contributions to the Ukrainian national revival. Together with fellow members of the Ruthenian Triad, he introduced the first phonetic orthography of the Ukrainian language. He also opposed the introduction of Latin alphabet, publishing his article Azbuka i abecadlo.

After his death in 1843, at the age of 32, Shashkevych was buried in Nowosilky, present-day Zolochiv Raion of the Lviv Oblast. In 1891 his mortal remains were transferred to the Lychakiv Cemetery.

== Commemoration ==
Shashkevych became a cult figure among Ukrainian intelligentsia in Galicia, and the celebrations of his centenary reportedly overshadowed even the memorial events in honour of Ukrainian national poet Taras Shevchenko.

== See also ==
- Ukrainian literature
