= Book Forum Lviv =

Biggest book fair in Ukraine

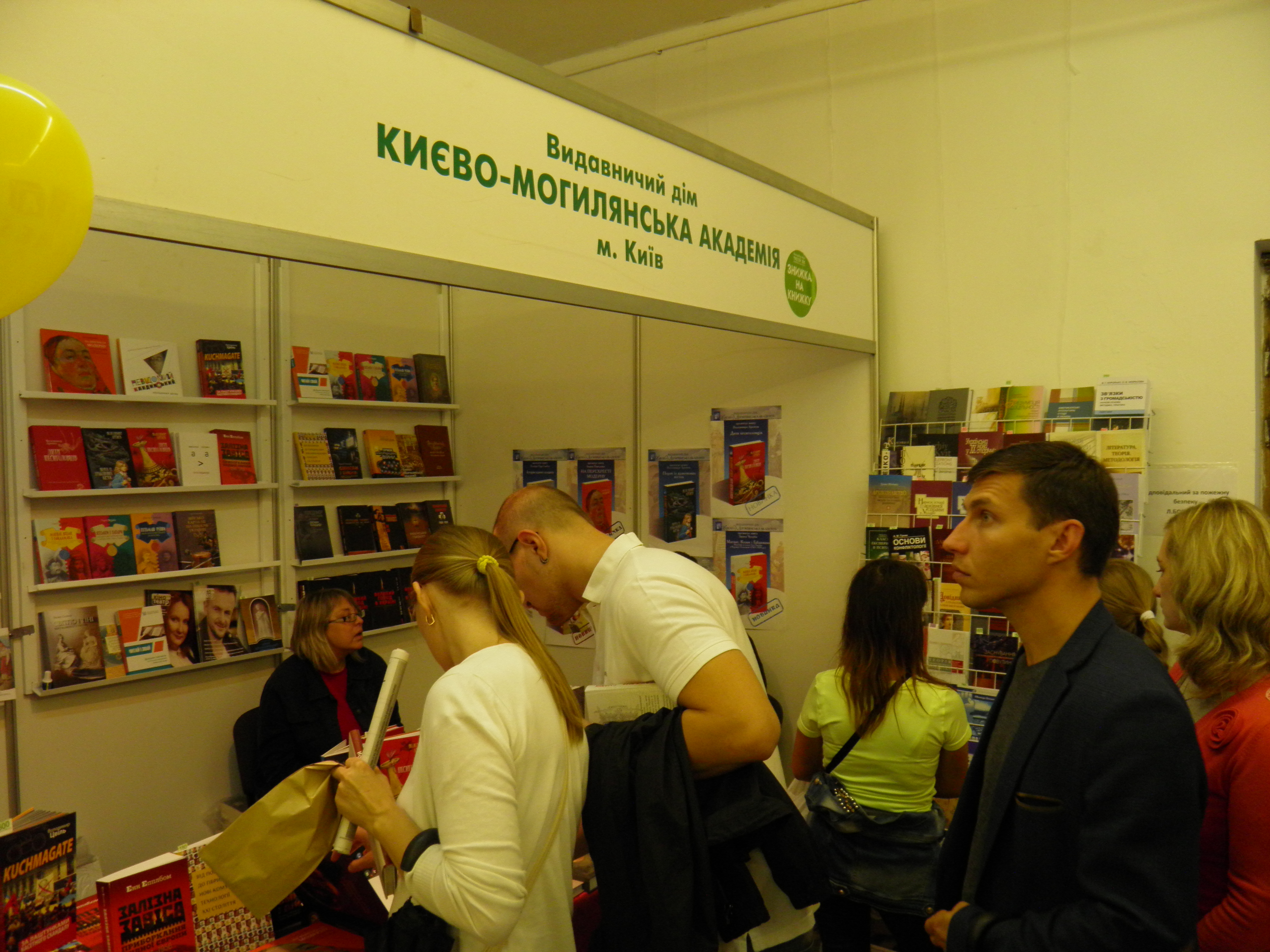
- Book Forum Lviv 2018
- Status: Active
- Genre: Book fair
- Venue: Potocki Palace, Lviv
- Location: Lviv
- Country: Ukraine
- Inaugurated: 1994; 32 years ago
- Organiser: Publishers' Forum
- Website: Official website

Book Forum Lviv (formerly The Lviv Publishers' Forum; Ukrainian: Львівський книжковий форум) is the biggest book fair in Ukraine. It has been held in Lviv each September since 1994 and is organized by the Publishers' Forum, an NGO founded after the success of the initial Lviv book forum. It is the largest book fair in Ukraine and one of the largest events of its kind in Eastern Europe. It has also been called Lviv's most popular event. Main expositions are located in the Palace of Arts near the Potocki Palace.

The forum program includes literary events and contests, presentations of publishing houses and authors, meetings with authors, literary readings, autograph sessions, discussions, round-table meetings, and performances. It participates in the organization of collective expositions at the international book fairs in Warsaw, Moscow, Frankfurt, Leipzig, Pisa, and Vilnius.

== History ==
=== 1994 ===
The Lviv Publishers' Forum was founded in September 1994 by the National Museum of Lviv. At the time, the Ukrainian book market collapsed after a nationwide economic crisis in 1992-1993. Oleksandra Koval, then organiser and person in charge in future, decided to establish a book fair to get publishers together and survive in a hard time. It was founded by the International Renaissance Foundation, and the fair collaborates with the Ukrainian Association of Publishers and Book Distributors (Ukrainian: Українська асоціація видавців та книгорозповсюджувачів). The fair held a series of 25 professional and literary events, including literary events and competitions, presentations of publishing houses and authors, author meetings, literary readings, autograph sessions, discussions, round tables, performances, etc. The forum was modelled after the Warsaw Book Fair (pl) in Poland.

The Frankfurt Book Fair had attended the forum for several years until early 2000, when Ukraine stopped requesting cooperation anymore. Starting this year, the NGO "Publishers' Forum" has been participating in the organisation of collective exhibitions at international book fairs in Warsaw, Moscow, Frankfurt, Leipzig, Pisa, and Vilnius.

The logo of the book fair was designed by Mykhailo Moskal, depicting two snails supporting a vertically placed book with their shells. Snails symbols "infinity, rebirth, indomitability, determination, perseverance, and interaction". It had been used until 2018.

=== 1995 ===
The Publishers' Forum Best Book Award was established.

=== 1997 ===
The Literary Festival, a highly popular event among Ukrainian youth, separates from the Forum.

=== 2001 ===
Foreign guests start to participate in the Literary Festival.

=== 2002 ===
The "Best Young Reader of Ukraine" contest is established. Over the years around 500 thousand children from all over Ukraine have taken part in it.

=== 2005 ===
The contest "The Best Young Reader of Ukraine" becomes nationwide.

=== 2006 ===
An annual charity event, "Present a Child with a Book!", is introduced.

=== 2006 ===
The Literary Festival becomes international.

=== 2007 ===
"The Best Young Reader of Ukraine" and the Festival "Bookmania" became a part of the "Publishers' Forum for Children" which is an event devoted to children's literature and reading.

=== 2007 ===
Within the Lviv Publishers' Forum the publishers' business forum, a program of professional events for book publishers, is established.

=== 2007–2010 ===
The International Educational Forum "Education" takes place. It includes a specialized exhibition of educational technologies, educational and instructional materials and educational institutions and the International Colloquium "The European Dimension of Ukrainian Education" with the chiefs of the Ministry of Education and Science of Ukraine and scientists involved.

=== 2008–2012 ===
Each year two weeks before the "Publishers' Forum for Children" the "Readers' Marathon" is held during which Ukrainian writers visit schools in Lviv and run contests, readings, discussions, etc.

=== 2010 ===
Within the Lviv Publishers' Forum, a program of professional events for librarians, called "Biblioforum", is held. Within the Lviv Publishers' Forum, the TRANSLIT international translation festival is established.

=== 2011 ===
Due to the extension of the format and geography of the festival, the "Publishers' Forum for Children" changes its name to the Lviv International Children's Festival.

=== 2011–2012 ===
The international project «ArtDrome: literature and more» within the program of cultural managers exchange "TANDEM: Ukraine European Union Moldova".

=== 2012 ===
NGO "Publishers' Forum" organizes Ukraine's stand at the Leipzig Book Fair.

=== 2012 ===
NGO "Publishers' Forum" becomes the local partner of the project "Book Platform" in Ukraine.

=== 2012 ===
Within the Lviv Publishers' Forum, the festival of cultural management and literary criticism CONTEXT is established.

=== 2013 ===
Within the Lviv Publishers' Forum, the status "Country Guest of Honor" is established and inaugurally granted to Poland.

=== 2017 ===
Author Larysa Denysenko is forced to cancel her talk at the Forum as the event organizers felt they couldn't guarantee safety after receiving threats, including a letter from 15 radical far-right nationalist groups, based on the content of her children's book that included same-sex parents.

=== 2020 ===
Held online due to the COVID-19 pandemic.

== See also ==
- Arsenal Book Festival
