= Larisa Matveyeva =

Larysa Matvyeyeva Лариса Матвєєва
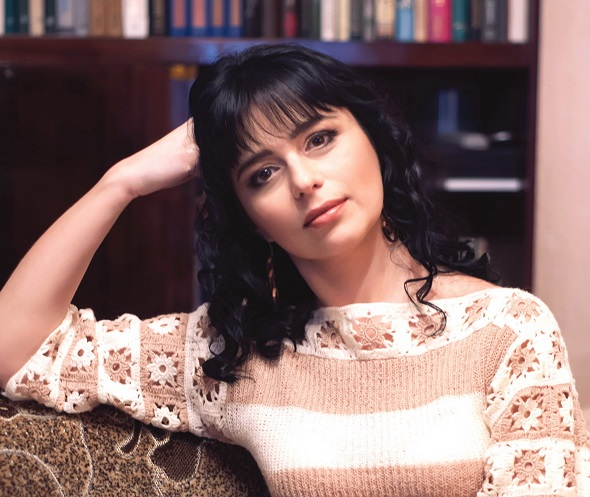
- Born: May 9, 1969; Mykolaiv, Ukraine
- Occupations: poet, novelist, playwright, translator
- Writing career
- Language: Russian, Ukrainian
- Genres: poetry, drama, novel, song lyrics
- Notable awards: The Golden Harp (1995, Ukraine), Diploma of the Festival of Folk Creativity Friendship (1997, Ukraine), Diploma of The Festival of Modern Pop Song Horizon (2001, Ukraine)

Larysa Vitaliivna Matveyeva (Ukrainian: Лариса Віталіївна Матвєєва; born May 9, 1969, Mykolaiv, Ukraine) is a poet, novelist, playwright, and translator. She is a member of The National Writers' Union of Ukraine (1998).

== Biography ==
Larysa Matvyeyeva was born on May 9, 1969, in Mykolaiv, Ukraine.

Matvyeyeva graduated from The Mykolaiv National Pedagogical University (now—The Mykolaiv Vasyl Sukhomlynskyi National University) in 1992 (Faculty of History and Law). She has worked at the Mykolaiv State Enterprise "Shipyard named after 61 Communards" -- "UkrOboronProm" since 1993 in the Computer and Information Department of Administrative Systems, and since 2007—she has been a chief second to the head-chief of the department.

Matvyeyeva has written poetry since her youth. She attended The Literary Studio "Borviy" led by the Ukrainian poet Dmytro Kremin at the Mykolaiv Regional House of Creative Arts. Her first poetry publication appeared in the Mykolaiv Regional Youth Newspaper Lenin's Followers in 1990. She employs a range of poetic forms. Her first book of poetry, Motif of Destiny, was published in 1994. She won the Mykolaiv poetry award for young writers, The Golden Harp, in 1995.

Matvyeyeva has published in a number genres: poetry, prose, essay, translation, poetic drama, and song lyrics. A number of Ukrainian composers and singers have created over 30 songs using her poetry for lyrics.

She is one of the editors for the international online magazine, Literary Mykolaiv.

A great amount of Matvyeyeva's work has seen publication in the local Mykolaiv and Ukrainian national press. She has received many awards for her contributions to the cultural development of Mykolaiv Region and Ukrainian culture and literature.

"I would say, no exact diagnosis
Exists in the medical archives other than this one:
The more worse your heart feels and soul suffers,
The better poetry you write!"

(Larysa Matvyeyeva, from the poetry collection, "Soul")

== Works ==
=== Collections of poetry ===
- 1994 Motif of Destiny («Мотив судьбы»)
- 1996 Broken Pieces («Осколки»)
- 2000 Full Moon («Полнолуние»)
- 2016 Soul («Душа»)
- 2018 Mosaic of Poems («Мозаика стихов»)
- 2020 Let Saint Nicholas To Guard It («Пусть Николай Святой его хранит»)

=== Plays ===
- 1996 His Majesty («Светлейший»)

=== Novels ===
- 2002 Prohibited Luxury («Непозволительная роскошь»)

=== Translations ===
Larysa Matvyeyeva has translated into the Russian language literary works by the following authors:

- Valerii Boychenko
- Volodymyr Sosiura
- Svitlana Ishchenko
- Omar Khayyam

== Awards ==
- Winner of The Golden Harp Poetry Contest (1995)
- Diploma in Strengthening of Nations' Friendships and The National Societies Council Anthem—The Festival of Folk Creativity Friendship (1997)
- Diploma in Creative Work With Children and Youth and Song Lyrics—The Festival of Modern Pop Song Horizon (2001)
- Diploma in Development of the National Literature from The Culture Department of Mykolaiv Regional Administration (2004)
- Certificate in the Ukrainian Culture Development from the mayor of the city of Kyiv (2004)
- Diploma of The Mykolaiv Regional Council of People's Deputies for contribution to the cultural development of the Mykolaiv Region (2014)
