= Taisiia Nakonechna =

Ukrainian writer and translator

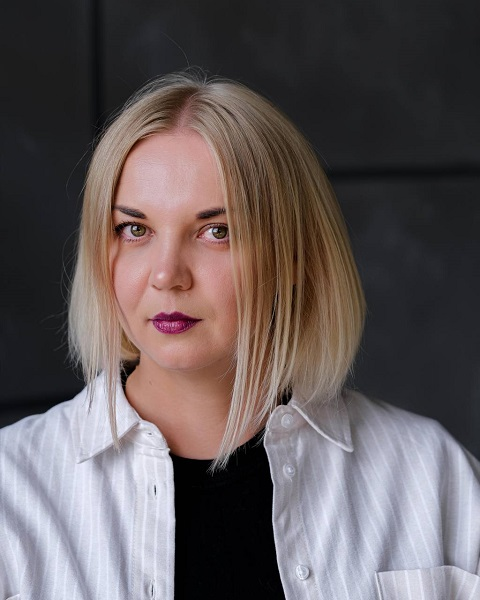
- Born: May 2, 1985 (age 41); Chernivtsi, Ukraine
- Education: Yuriy Fedkovych Chernivtsi National University
- Occupations: writer, publisher, translator, artist, cultural manager
- Partner: Ihor Nakonechnyi
- Website: taisiianakonechna.com

Taisiia Viktorivna Nakonechna (Zaplitna) (Ukrainian: Таїсія Вікторівна Наконечна (Заплітна); born 1985) is a Ukrainian writer, translator and cultural manager. She is the founder and editor-in-chief of Parasolia Publishing.

== Biography ==
Taisiia Nakonechna was born in 1985 in the Chernivtsi region, Ukraine. Her mother was a medical professional, while her father worked as a freestyle wrestling coach, educator, and entrepreneur.

=== Education ===
Nakonechna completed her early education in Kruhlyk, later attending the Kamianets-Podilskyi Municipal Lyceum (Khmelnytskyi region), where she specialized in philology. She graduated from Yuriy Fedkovych Chernivtsi National University with a degree from the Faculty of Foreign Languages.

After graduation, she worked as an English language instructor and taught linguistic disciplines at the Department of Communicative Linguistics and Translation. She also served as Deputy Dean for Educational Affairs. Nakonechna completed her postgraduate studies at the Department of English Language at Chernivtsi National University.

She studied Dutch at Ghent University and fine arts at the Saint Luke Academy in Ghent, Belgium.

== Literary Career ==
Nakonechna has been writing since childhood. She was the recipient of multiple literary awards in her youth, including a 2002 award from the Junior Academy of Sciences in Kyiv. In 2003, she won the Vadym Koval Young Authors Literary Competition in Chernivtsi, the same year her debut poetry collection Bezrichchia (Thinglessness) was published.

Nakonechna's works have appeared in the literary journals Буковинський журнал (Bukovyna Journal) and Університетський вісник (University Herald), on the online literary platform Інша література (Other Literature), and in the anthologies Вигране (Vyhrane) and 70 віршів (70 Poems).

Following a period of reduced literary activity, Nakonechna resumed publishing in 2017 with her poetry collection Solovyi z Shaolinia (Nightingales from Shaolin) with Lileya-NV. In 2018, she published two more books: Bezrichchia 2.0 and Zhittia pid Parasoleiu (Under My Umbrella), both with 21 Publishing House.

In 2021, her translation of Belgian poet Alain van Clooster’s Fresh Cheese with Wormwood (Platte kaas met alsem) was published. In 2022, her translation of the Mechelen urban legend The Extinguishing of the Moon (Maneblusser) was released in Belgium. That same year, Parasolia Publishing released her collection of short stories To See Paris, with blurbs by Rostyslav Semkiv and Tetiana Vlasova.

In 2023, her novella Сокотиха (Sokotykha) was shortlisted in a war prose competition organized by Білка (Bilka Publishing House). The work was subsequently included in Альманах 2023 (Almanac 2023).

In 2024, her short story Хлопчик збирає мушлі (Nice Day For Collecting Seashells) was included in the contemporary Ukrainian prose anthology Переступи (Transgressions), published by Пабулюм (Pabulum Publishing House).

In 2024, the author's poetry collection "Kerygma" was published by the Old Lion Publishing House, with a foreword by Hanna Uliura and illustrations by Serhii Mirchuk.

In 2026, her short story Божі комашки (God's Little Creatures) appeared in Баби-онучки (Grandmothers and Granddaughters), a collection published by Creative Women Publishing.

Her novella За Брюсcельським часом (Brussels Time) was included in the anthology of contemporary Ukrainian short fiction Мереживо долі або вишиванка (Embroidered by Fate: The Vyshyvanka), which was presented in 2026. The anthology was issued in Ukrainian, Polish, and English editions by Szwajpolt Fiol Publishing House, with the support of Fundacja św. Włodzimierza (St. Volodymyr Foundation) in Kraków..

In 2026, Nakonechna also published the children's short story collection Принесіть мені дитинку (Hanna's Baby Project) with Bohdan Publishing House.

Her works have been translated into Polish and English. She has also translated several of her own poems into Dutch and English. Her book "Het land dat weigert kapot te gaan" appeared in 2026 in Dutch.

Nakonechna is a member of PEN Vlaanderen. On February 24, 2025, an online event took place, at which PEN club member Taisiia Nakonechna read Dutch translations of poems by Victoria Amelina, Artur Dron, and Lyubov Yakymchuk.

=== Parasolia Publishing ===
In March 2021, Nakonechna founded Parasolia Publishing, a Ukrainian publishing startup dedicated exclusively to Ukrainian authors. Between 2021 and 2024, the publishing house released over 20 titles.

Books from Parasolia have received accolades including recognition at the Best Book Design – 2022 competition organized by Mystetskyi Arsenal, and have been recommended by Ukrainian PEN and the Book of the Year awards. Notably, the publisher won the Kids Book nomination with A Tale of the Black Square. Titles from the publisher have been translated into Polish, German, Greek, and English.

== Public Activities ==
Nakonechna actively participated in Ukraine’s Orange Revolution and the Revolution of Dignity. Following the full-scale Russian invasion of Ukraine in 2022, she co-organized a crisis headquarters in Ghent, Belgium, and helped establish the Ukrainian Refugee Committee in Belgium.

Since 2005, she has been an active member of Plast, the National Scout Organization of Ukraine. She served as head of the Chernivtsi branch and was awarded the Order of St. George in bronze —the highest distinction of senior scouts — for her contributions.

Nakonechna founded Plast kurin (troop) No. 74 named after Iryna Vilde and coordinated national-level work with adult volunteers. She is currently involved with Plast in Belgium.

She is also engaged in establishing a platform for cross-cultural exchange in Belgium.

In 2024, Taisiia Nakonechna ran as a candidate for the Ghent City Council as part of the electoral bloc of the incumbent mayor, Voor Gent, listed as number 39 on the party’s slate. Although she was not elected, she received 606 personal votes.

== Bibliography ==
Poetry

- Bezrichchia (2003), Misto Publishing, Chernivtsi
- Solovyi z Shaolinia (2017), Lileya-NV
- Bezrichchia 2.0 (2018), 21 Publishing House
- Kerygma (2024), Old Lion Publishing House

Etudes

- Zhittia pid Parasoleiu (2018), 21 Publishing House

Prose

- To See Paris (2022; 2nd ed. 2023), Parasolia Publishing
- Bring Me a Baby: Short Stories (2026), Bohdan Publishing House

Anthologies

- Вигране(2006)
- 70 Віршів (2010)
- Альманах 2023 (Almanac 2023), Білка (Bilka Publishing House)
- Переступи (Violations, anthology, 2024), Pabulum Publishing
- Баби-онучки (2026), Creative Women Publishing
- Мереживо долі або вишиванка (Embroidered by Fate: The Vyshyvanka, 2026), anthology of contemporary Ukrainian short fiction, Szwajpolt Fiol Publishing House, with the support of Fundacja św. Włodzimierza (St. Volodymyr Foundation)

Translations (from Dutch into Ukrainian)

- Fresh Cheese with Wormwood by Alain van Clooster (2021), 21 Publishing House
- The Extinguishing of the Moon (2022, published in Belgium)
- Doe je mee?(2024) Alles over vriendschap, Pauline Oud, Ранок (Ranok Publishing House)
- Wat voel jij? (2024), Pauline Oud, Ранок (Ranok Publishing House)
- Noa krijgt een bril (2024), Pauline Oud, Ранок (Ranok Publishing House).
- Als je papa en mama gescheiden zijn (2025), Pauline Oud, Ранок (Ranok Publishing House).
- Ik kan wachten (2025). Alles over geduld, Pauline Oud, Ранок (Ranok Publishing House).
- Alsjeblieft, dankjewel (2026). Alles over respect en beleefdheid, Pauline Oud, Ранок (Ranok Publishing House).
