= National Writers' Union of Ukraine =

Association of professional writers, critics, and translators

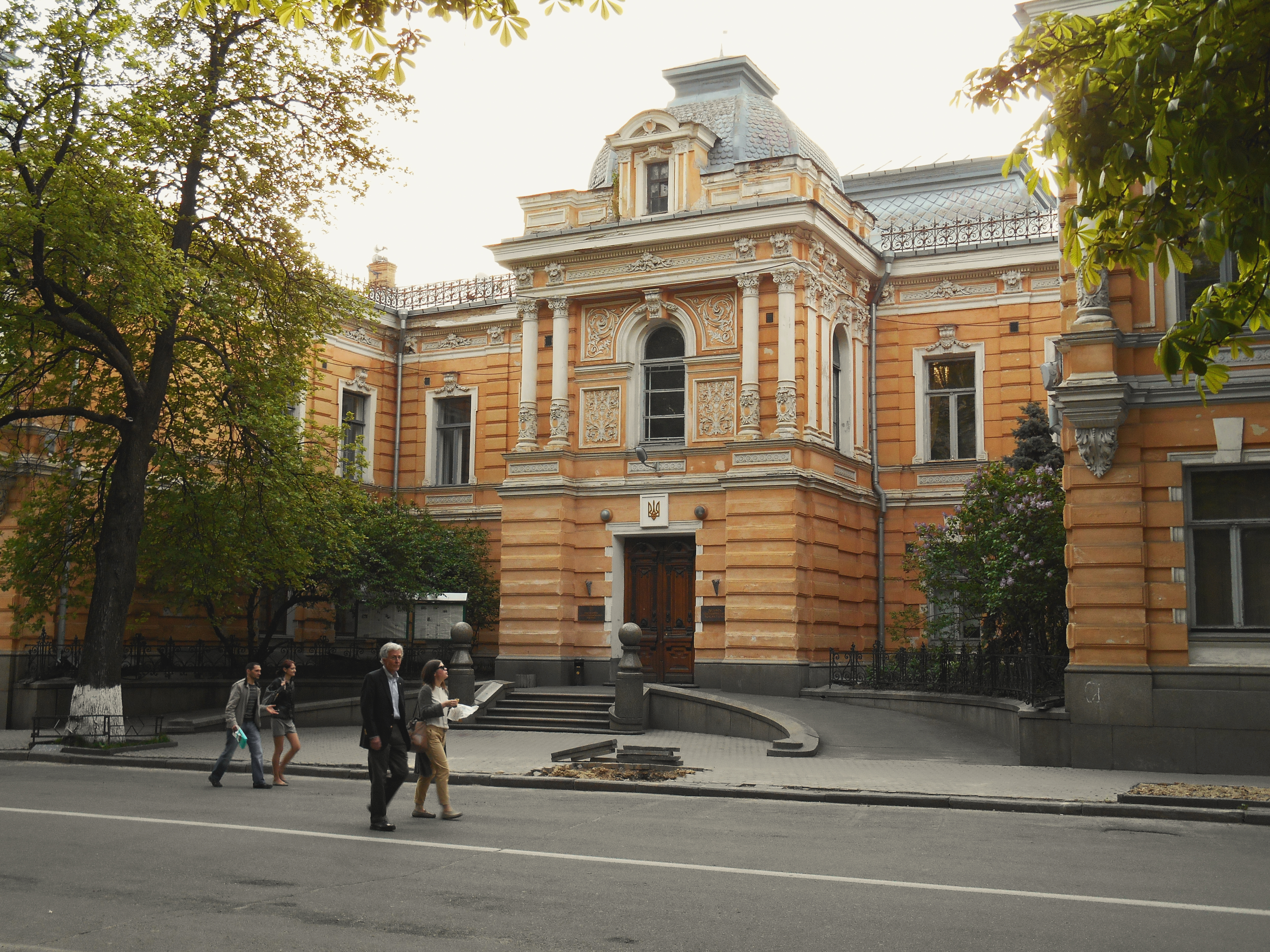
House of Liberman on Bankova Street - office of the NWUU

The National Writers' Union of Ukraine (Ukrainian: Національна спілка письменників України, romanized: Natsionalna spilka pysmennykiv Ukrainy) (NSPU)) (НСПУ) is a voluntary social-creative association of professional writers, poets, prose writers, playwrights, critics, and translators.

== History ==
The National Writers' Union of Ukraine was founded in 1934 as the Ukrainian SSR Union of Writers, a part of the Union of Soviet Writers, which was established in the same year.

In post-communist time, the Writers' Union of Ukraine declared its independence from any Soviet structures (1991).

In 1997 the Union split, losing some of its members who created a new organization, the Association of Ukrainian Writers.

In 2020, the Union blacklisted publications from countries that politically opposed the "territorial integrity of Ukraine." The list included Russia, Belarus, China, and Armenia.

After the 2022 Russian invasion of Ukraine, the NSPU called for the Mikhail Bulgakov Museum to be closed. Mikhail Bulgakov, who the museum honors, was accused of anti-Ukrainian and imperialist attitudes.

== Organisation ==
Today the National Writers' Union of Ukraine has over 1,800 members, including 84 writers living abroad. The majority of NSPU members write in the Ukrainian language, while others write in Russian, Moldavian, Yiddish, Hungarian, Greek, etc. Regional organizations of the Union are situated in every oblast centre of Ukraine and large cities.

The supreme body of the National Writers' Union of Ukraine is the Congress of Ukrainian Writers, which is gathered in five years. In the between time, the Union is managed by the Council and Presidium of the National Writers' Union of Ukraine. Executive functions are delegated to the Secretariat.

The National Writers' Union of Ukraine has special literary awards to honour the best achievements in corresponding fields, among which are Lesia Ukrainka Prize, the Ivan Franko Prize, the Pavlo Tychyna Prize, the Maksym Rylsky Prize, "Blahovist" (Church Bells), and others.

The headquarters of the Union is located at 2 Bankova Street, the former residence of Trepov and later Liebermann.

== Notable members ==
- Anatoly Kasheida, writer, poet, and journalist
- Pavlo Zahrebelnyi, Ukrainian novelist
- Mykola Chaban, Merited Journalist of Ukraine and Dnipropetrovsk regional studies specialist
- Larisa Matveyeva, poet, novelist, and playwright
- Ihor Pavlyuk, Ukrainian writer, translator and research worker.
- Dmytro Kremin, poet and journalist
- Larysa Khorolets, Ukrainian actress and Minister of Culture
- Svetlana Ischenko, poet, stage actress and translator
- Yuri Pokalchuk, head of the international department
- Felix Krivin, prosaist and screenwriter
- Ivan Holovchenko, militsiya general
- Ivanna Blazhkevych, children's writer, public figure and educator
- Efim Alexandrov, stand-up comedian and Yiddish folk music performer
- Mykola Bazhan, Soviet Ukrainian writer, poet, and public figure
- Oleksandr Korniychuk, playwright, literary critic, and state official
- Ivan Kulyk, poet, writer, translator, diplomat, and Communist Party activist
- Volodymyr Yavorivsky, poet, writer, journalist, and politician
- Oles Honchar, writer, public figure, and Soviet Ukrainian World War II veteran
- Tetiana Yakovenko, poet, literary critic, teacher
- Olena Teliha, poet, literary critic, member of The Organization of Ukrainian Nationalists
- Petro Midyanka, poet and teacher
- Andriy Bondar, poet and translator
- Borys Bilash, poet and politician
- Hanna Chubach, poet and journalist
- Natalia Kharakoz, journalist and writer
- Oleksandr Mokrovolskyi, writer and translator
- Maksym Strikha, writer and translator
- Leonid Topchiy, poet, writer, journalist, and translator
