= Svetlana Lavochkina =

Ukrainian writer

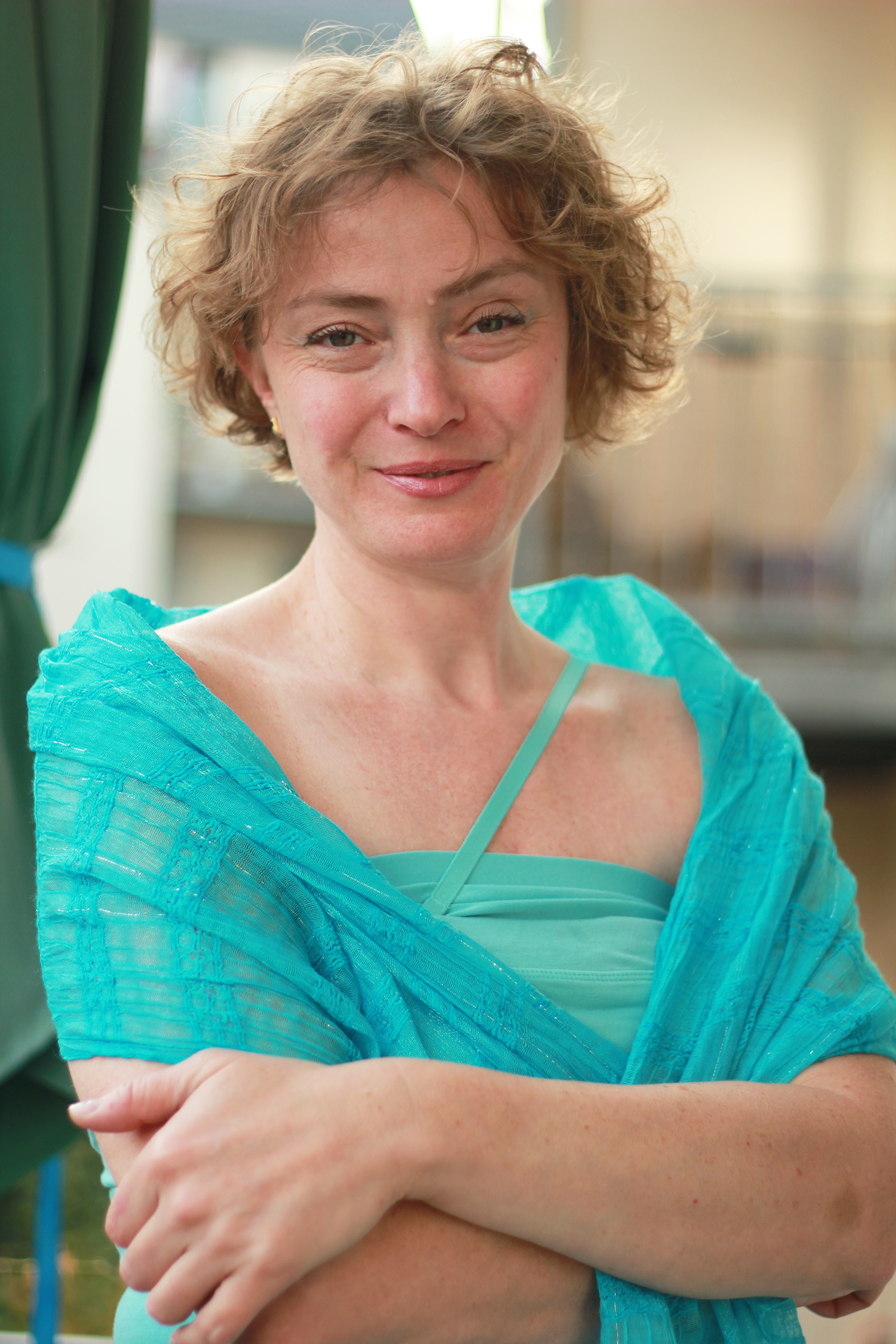
- Lavochkina in 2019
- Born: 1973 (age 52–53) Zaporizhzhia, Ukrainian SSR, Soviet Union
- Occupation: Writer, literary translator
- Language: English

Svetlana Lavochkina (Ukrainian: Світлана Лавочкіна; born 1973) is a Ukrainian writer and literary translator. She lives in Leipzig. The language of her literary work is English. Her novel Zap was published in German translation in 2019 under the title Puschkins Erben.

== Biography ==
Lavochkina grew up as the only child of her parents in Zaporizhzhia in southeastern Ukraine. Her mother was a piano teacher, her father an engineer and photographer. She studied languages at a pedagogical college. At the age of 26, she moved to Germany with her husband as a Jewish quota refugee. They could choose whether they wanted to live in Dresden, Chemnitz or Leipzig.

In her own words, she had to develop a "new identity" in Germany. Most Jews in Ukraine had adapted to the Soviet lifestyle since the 1960s after the second wave of purges under Stalin, which was mainly directed against Jews. Lavochkina's parents were not particularly religious, but traditional dishes were served on holidays such as Passover and the Jewish New Year. As a child, she first learned from her grandmother that they were Jews. At her grandmother's insistence, she attended an English-language school, unusual for a Soviet child at the time; English became her second language and created a distance from her surroundings. She did not directly experience antisemitism in her childhood. Today she sees herself as a global citizen and is proud of her Jewish origins. Lavochkina belongs to the Jewish community in Leipzig. She has taught her two sons what it means to be Jewish.

In addition to her work as a writer and translator, Lavochkina works as an English teacher at the Waldorf School in Leipzig and writes for the English-language international literary magazine LeipGlo.

In 2025 Lavochkina taught poetry translation at the Translating Ukraine Summer Institute, held from 7 to 18 July at the Ossolineum in Wrocław. The programme is co-organised, among others, by the Ukrainian Research Institute at Harvard University.

== Works ==
Lavochkina has translated Ukrainian and Russian poetry into English, including poems by Osip Mandelstam, Vasyl Holoborodko, Dmytro Kremin, Mykola Bazhan, Lyuba Yakimchuk and Borys Khersonsky. She has written short stories and poems published in British and American anthologies and literary magazines. Her success as a writer began with her novella Dam Duchess. She submitted the unpublished manuscript to a literary competition run by the Paris bookshop Shakespeare and Company and won second prize in 2013.

The novella Dam Duchess was published by Whisk(e)y Tit in 2018 and translated into German by Diana Feuerbach under the title Die rote Herzogin in 2022. It is set in Zaporizhzhia in the late 1920s during the construction of the Dnieper Hydroelectric Station and serves as a prequel to Puschkins Erben, the German translation of Lavochkina's debut novel Zap. In the Leipziger Internet Zeitung, Die rote Herzogin was described as an "overture" to Puschkins Erben; the review highlighted the satirical portrayal of Stalinism during the construction of the Dnieper dam. The title Zap refers to the English abbreviation of Zaporizhzhia.

Zap, published in German translation by Diana Feuerbach under the title Puschkins Erben, is set in Zaporizhzhia in the 1970s. Lavochkina depicts the coexistence of Russian, Ukrainian, Jewish, Cossack and Roma families, with the Jewish families Winter, Knoblauch and Katz at the centre of the narrative. Frankfurter Allgemeine Zeitung reviewer Christiane Pöhlmann wrote that Lavochkina traced the atmosphere of the Brezhnev era, marked by dreariness and provincial narrowness. According to Pöhlmann, the novel addresses antisemitism, misogyny, the silence surrounding the Stalinist period and the denigration of the province in a vivid literary picture; beneath its entertaining surface, it tells a serious story of shattered dreams and life plans.

Lavochkina's novel in verse Carbon: Song of Crafts was published by Lost Horse Press in 2020. The work is written in polyphonic verse and deals with the eastern Ukrainian city of Donetsk against the background of industrial history, post-Soviet society and the war in the Donbas. Diana Feuerbach's German translation was published by Voland & Quist in 2024 under the title Carbon. Ein Lied von Donezk. In 2022, the Ukrainian self-translation of Carbon won second prize at the Lviv literary award "The Winged Lion".

== Bibliography ==
=== Novels ===
- Dam Duchess (novella). Whisk(e)y Tit, 2018, ISBN 978-0-9996215-5-4.
  - Die rote Herzogin. Translated into German by Diana Feuerbach. Voland & Quist, Berlin/Dresden 2022, ISBN 978-3-86391-323-6.
- Zap (novel). Whisk(e)y Tit, Rochester 2017, ISBN 978-0-9967646-7-4.
  - Puschkins Erben. Translated into German by Diana Feuerbach. Voland & Quist, Berlin/Dresden 2019, ISBN 978-3-86391-242-0.
- Carbon: Song of Crafts (novel in verse). Lost Horse Press, Sandpoint 2020, ISBN 978-1-7333400-4-5.
  - Carbon. Ein Lied von Donezk. Translated into German by Diana Feuerbach. Voland & Quist, Berlin/Dresden 2024, ISBN 978-3-86391-405-9.

=== Translations ===
From Ukrainian into English:

- A Violin from the Other Riverside (Eine Geige vom anderen Flussufer by Dmytro Kremin). Lost Horse Press, 2023, ISBN 979-8-9865715-3-9.
- Apricots of Donbas (Abrykosy Donbasu by Lyuba Yakimchuk). Translated by Oksana Maksymchuk, Max Rosochinsky and Svetlana Lavochkina. Lost Horse Press, Contemporary Ukrainian Poetry Series, 2015, ISBN 978-1-7364323-1-0.
- Borys Khersonsky: Queen Saturday. Translated by Svetlana Lavochkina and Oksana Rosenblum. Lost Horse Press, announced for 2026.

=== Translations in anthologies ===
- The White Chalk of Days. The Contemporary Ukrainian Literature Series Anthology, edited by Mark Andryczyk. Academic Studies Press, Boston 2017, ISBN 978-1-61811-662-8, pp. 320–343.
- Words for War. New Poems from Ukraine, edited by Oksana Maksymchuk and Max Rosochinsky. Academic Studies Press, Boston 2017, ISBN 978-1-61811-666-6, pp. 19–24, 155, 160.
- Quiet Spiders of the Hidden Soul: Mykola (Nik) Bazhan's Early Experimental Poetry, edited by Oksana Rosenblum and Lev Fridman. Academic Studies Press, Boston 2020, ISBN 978-1-64469-394-0, pp. 2–10, 32, 34, 122–132.
