= Felix Krivin =

- Фе́лікс Кри́він
- Born: Felix Davidovich Krivin; June 11, 1928; Mariupol, USSR
- Died: December 24, 2016 (aged 88)
- Occupations: writer, poet, screenwriter
- Years active: 1962–2016
- Style: Humor

Felix Davidovich Krivin (Ukrainian: Фе́лікс Дави́дович Кри́він, tr. Félix Davídovich Krívin; June 11, 1928 – December 24, 2016) was a Soviet, Ukrainian and Israeli writer and poet, author of intellectual humoristic prose, screenwriter.

== Early life ==
Felix Davidovich Krivin was born June 11, 1928, in a Jewish family in Mariupol. His family moved to Odessa in 1933. In 1945, after evacuation, Krivin moved to Izmail, where he finished evening school. He graduated from the Kiev State Pedagogical Institute in 1951.

== Career ==
Krivin worked as a mechanic apprentice before becoming a mechanic on the "Edelweiss" barge of Danube Shipping Company. He later became a night shift proofreader in "Pridunayskaya Pravda" ("Danubian Truth") where his first poems were published, and a radiojournalist at the Izmail regional Radio Committee.

Krivin worked as a teacher in Mariupol from 1951 to 1954. After living in Kiev in 1954-1955, he moved to Uzhhgorod, where he worked as a contributing editor at Zakarpattia Oblast publishing house. In 1962, he was accepted to the Writers' Union of Ukraine. In 1990, Krivin was a laureate of the Korolenko republican award.

Krivin was the author of more than 25 books which were published starting from the 1960s by various Soviet publishing houses. He collaborated with comedian Arkady Raikin, for whom he wrote interludes. In 2006, he became a laureate of the Subcarpathian Rus independent literature "Russian award".

One of his most famous creations are the "half-legends"; in 2018, a few of the stories were the first of his work to be published in English in the online edition of the World Literature Today journal, translated from Russian by Anna Burneika.

== Personal life and death ==
Krivin moved to Israel, where he settled with his wife in Beersheba in 1998. He died on December 24, 2016, at the age of 88.
