= The Songs of the Jewish Shtetle =

The Songs of the Jewish Shtetle is a cultural musical project aimed at preserving Jewish cultural heritage. The project has gathered songs in Yiddish, a language put on the Red List of Threatened Languages by UNESCO. Before World War II, the number of native Yiddish speakers was approximately 11 million people. During the Holocaust, 6 million Jewish people were killed, thus the number of Yiddish speakers halved. The language continued in literature, oral speech, Ashkenazi folklore, and in songs. The project is as unique as the Jewish songs in Yiddish, which had been persecuted in various places that Jews had settled, and generally played only by small klezmer ensembles beforehand, were for the first time performed by a large symphony orchestra.

== Reception ==
Efim Alexandrov, the author, art director and soloist of the project, Honoured Artist of the Russian Federation, singer and custodian of the Yiddish song tradition, was awarded for his cultural activities including this project, with the Russian National Award “Person of the Year” in 2001 and the “Person of the Year – 5764” Award of the Federation of Jewish Communities of Russia in 2004. At "The Golden Nine" annual ceremony, a ceremony that recognizes contributions made to all the spheres of Israeli society, Efim Alexandrov was awarded by Israel television channel Israel Plus the special prize of "The Golden Nine" for his contribution to the world Jewish culture.

== Concert programs ==
In 2001, the first night of The Songs of Jewish Shtetle was held at the Novaya Opera theatre in Moscow under the patronage of the International Charity Fund of Yuri Bashmet.

The concert program included not only the songs created in Jewish shtetles in the Yiddish language, but also those that were written by people who left the shtetles after the Pale of Settlement had been abolished. In the 10 years since the project commenced, several concert programs have been created, and over 150 The Songs of Jewish Shtetle concerts have been played in the USA, Canada, Germany, Israel, Australia, Russia, and CIS countries. Together with the Russian State Symphony Cinema Orchestra conducted by Sergey Skripka. Efim Alexandrov recorded several CDs of songs from Jewish shtetles of Russia, Belarus, and Ukraine. Two concerts, one at the Novaya Opera theatre in Moscow, and the other at the State Central Concert Hall “Rossiya”, were filmed and later broadcast in many countries. The project presents traditional Jewish folk songs, as well as songs composed by S. Kemelmakher, E.Alexandrov, V.Shainsky, I.Lyublinsky, lyrics by S.Kemelmakher, B.Zitserman, M.Tanich, I.Kerler and others. Since 2001 several concert programs have been created.

The first concert program of The Songs of Jewish Shtetle featured songs that were included in "The Songs of Jewish Shtetle" music album:

- Lechaim (Yiddish: לעכײַם)
- Kinder yorn (Yiddish: קינדער יאָרן)
- Kuzine(Yiddish: די גרינע קוזינע)
- A yidishe mame (Yiddish: אַ ייִדישע מאַמע)
- Fregt vos ken ikh
- Gefilte fish (Yiddish: געפֿילטע פֿיש)
- Moishele main fraint (Yiddish: משהלע מײַן פֿרײַנד)
- Rebe (Yiddish: רעלע)
- Koift zhe papirosn (Yiddish: קױפֿט זשע פּאַפּיראָסן)
- Tumbalalaika
- Ich hob dikh tsufil lib (Yiddish: איך האָב דיך צופיל ליב)
- Itsik hot shoin khasene gehat (Yiddish: איציק האָט שוין חתונה געהאַט)
- Potpourri of Jewish songs

The second concert program of The Songs of Jewish Shtetle featured songs that were included in "The Songs of Jewish Shtetle-2" music album:

- Lechaim. Theme from Fiddler on the Roof by Jerry Bock
- A kleinichker vintele
- Bai mir bistu shein (Yiddish: בײַ מיר ביסטו שײן)
- Main Bershad. (Yiddish: מײַן בערשאד)
- Yidishe maiholim
- Tzip tzip hemrl
- Main tate (Yiddish: מײַן טאטע)
- Wu nemt men a bisele mazl (Yiddish: ?װוּ נעמט מען אַ ביסעלע מזל)
- A koshere kachke
- Sholem aleihem (Yiddish: שאלעם אלייכעם)

== Participants ==
- Directors: Aleksej Garnizov (2001) and Ljubov Grechishnikova (2005)
- Choreographers: Jurij Carenko (2001) and Nikolaj Androsov
- Art director: Aleksandr Grimm
- Sound producers: Gennadij Papin, Sergej Remezov
- Conductor: Sergej Skripka
- Directors of television versions:
- Lina Arifulina (2001) and Artjom Shadrov (2005)
- Arranger: Jurij Jakushev
- Literary editors and advisers:
- Boris Zicerman, Marija Kotljarova and Aleksandr Gercberg

The Musical and the Theatrical group:

- Russian State Symphony Cinema Orchestra
- Group of solo-instrumentalists of the State Jazz Music Chamber Orchestra of O.Lundstrem
- The State Ballet "Kostroma" (2001)
- The Moscow State Ensemble of Dance “Russian seasons”
- The vocal ensemble “A' cappella express”.
- The vocal ensemble "Vocal-Band"
- The vocal ensemble "Moscow-Transit"
- An academical chorus under the leadership of Ljudmila Urman
- A concert chorus under the leadership of V. Rybin
- Actors of the Theatre of National Art under the leadership of V. Nazarov
- The Boys’ Choir of the Moscow Choral School named after Sveshnikov
- Children's choreographic ensemble "Buratino"
- “The Moscow Music-Hall”
