= Efim Alexandrov =

Russian singer

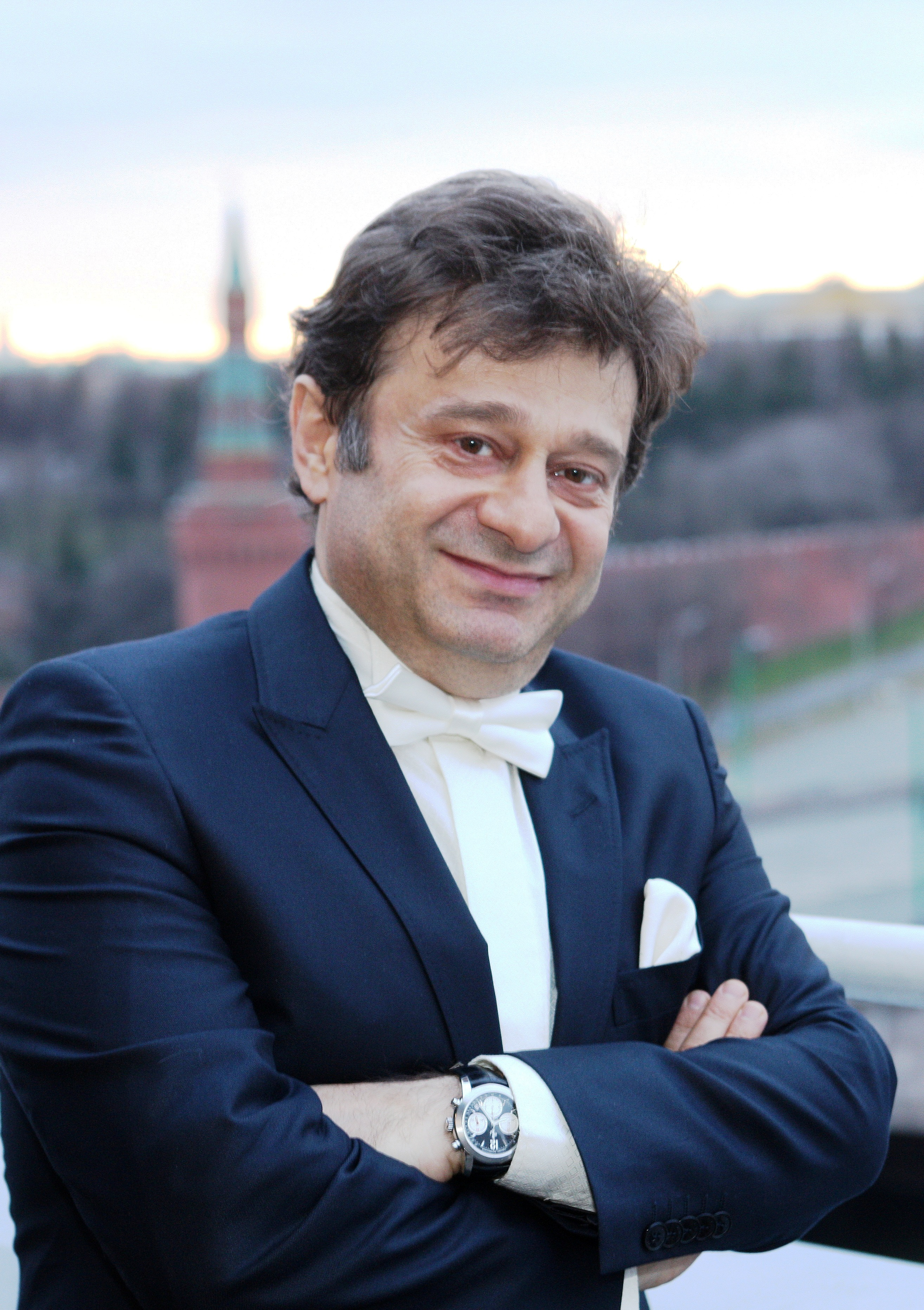

Efim Alexandrov (born Efimian Ziсerman; 13 May 1960, Pidvolochysk Raion, Ternopil Oblast, Ukrainian SSR) is a Russian artist of the "spoken word” genre (stand-up comedian) and performer of Jewish music. He focuses in particular on Yiddish folk songs, intent on preserving a culture of Klezmer that is considered endangered in Eastern Europe and Russia. He is a Meritorious Artist. (2007).

== Parents ==
Alexandrov's parents, Lubov Efimovna and Boris Mikhailovich Ziсerman, were born in the township of Bershad in Vinnytsia Oblast and later interned as Bershad Ghetto prisoners. After the liberation of Bershad in 1944, Boris Ziсerman was called up for military service in the Soviet Army. Following the end of the war in Western Ukraine and his military discharge, he attended and graduated from Lviv University. He then worked as letters department manager in the neighborhood papers of Pidvolochysk Raion and, later, Volochysk of Khmelnytskyi Oblast. Lubov Efimovna graduated from secondary medical school, then worked for 40 years as a nurse in the infectious disease ward at Pidvolochysk regional hospital.

== Early life ==
While in secondary school, Efim Ziсerman also attended and graduated from a music academy with a specialty in clarinet. His family moved to Volochysk in 1968, where he actively participated in amateur talent groups. In 1976, after finishing nine classes in Volochysk secondary school, he enrolled in a state theatre school in Dnipropetrovsk and took part in a variety of entertainment television programs. He also joined the local Writers' Union of Ukraine. A number of his poems and reviews were published in various Ukrainian newspapers and magazines. After his graduation from state theatre school, Alexandrov first worked with the Ternopol puppet theatre, then joined the faculty of the Lunacharsky Russian Academy of Theatre Arts.

Alexandrov actively cooperated with the Bureau of Propaganda of the Composers Union of the USSR. He was also invited to be a soloist in the Jewish Chamber Musical Theatre, where he debuted in "Khelem Wise Men” on its opening night. He was later invited to the “Rosconcert” in the Theatre of Musical Parodies where, under the direction of Vladimir Vinokur, he served as both a performance artist and a producer.

== Creative activity ==
In 1993 Efim Alexandrov published his first musical album entitled "A Gic In Parovoz,” an idiomatic expression in Yiddish. It featured Jewish folk music, as well as songs composed by Ilya Lubinsky and poems written by Mikhail Tanich. The following year, a Kyiv television studio adapted the album into a musical concert film of the same name.

In 2004 the Federation of Jewish Communities of Russia named Efim Alexandrov "Man of the Year 5764." They also honored him with "The Golden Nine," an award decided by the votes of hundreds of thousands of Russophone Israelis that recognized his contribution to world Jewish culture. In recent years he has also been working with The Songs of the Jewish Shtetle project.
