= Taras Kremin =

Ukrainian politician (born 1978)

- Тарас Кремінь
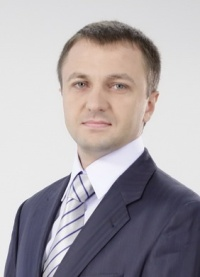

State Language Protection Commissioner
- In office July 8, 2020 – July 8, 2025
- Preceded by: None
- Succeeded by: Olena Ivanovska

Personal details
- Born: Тарас Дмитрович Кремінь; 10 June 1978 (age 48) Kazanka, Mykolaiv Oblast, Ukrainian SSR, USSR
- Party: People's Front
- Parent: Dmytro Kremin (father)
- Education: Mykolaiv National University (2000); T.H. Shevchenko Institute of Literature (2004); Hryhorii Skovoroda University in Pereiaslav (2013)
- Occupation: politician, teacher, lecturer, lawmaker, ombudsman
- Website: Taras Kremin's Official Website at Verkhovna Rada

Taras Dmytrovych Kremin (Ukrainian: Тарас Дмитрович Кремінь; born June 10, 1978) is a Ukrainian politician, scientist and public figure.

In 2014, Kremin became the chairman of the 6th convocation of the Mykolaiv Oblast Council. He was also a people's deputy from the People's Front party during the 8th convocation of the Verkhovna Rada.

Since 8 July 2020, by the decision of the Government of Ukraine, Kremin was approved to be State Language Protection Commissioner.

Taras Kremin is the son of Ukrainian poet and Shevchenko Prize laureate Dmytro Kremin.
