= Mykolaiv Oblast Council =

Legislature of Mykolaiv Oblast, Ukraine

Type
- Type: Unicameral
- Houses: 1

Leadership
- Speaker: Anton Tabunshchik (acting)

Structure
- Seats: 64
- Political groups: Government (34): Opposition Platform — For Life (18); Servant of the People (16); Opposition (30): Our Land (10); European Solidarity (8); Proposition (7); For the Future (5)

Elections
- Last election: 25 October 2020

Meeting place
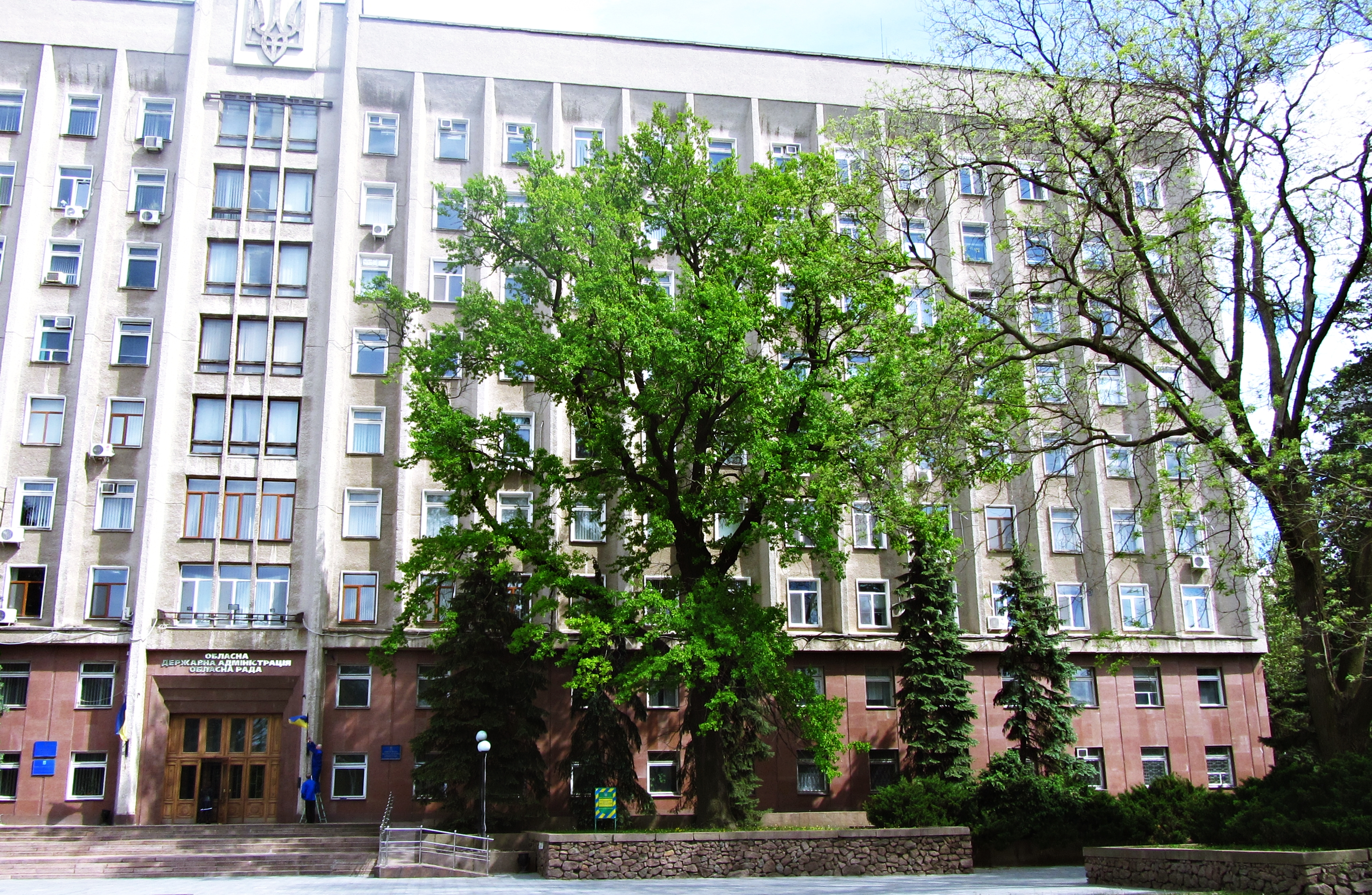
- Mykolaiv, Mykolaiv Oblast

Website
- https://www.mk-oblrada.gov.ua/

The Mykolaiv Oblast Council (Ukrainian: Миколаївська обласна рада) is the regional oblast council (parliament) of the Mykolaiv Oblast (province) located in southern Ukraine.

Council members are elected for five year terms. In order to gain representation in the council, a party must gain more than 5 percent of the total vote.

== Recent elections ==
=== 2020 ===
Distribution of seats after the 2020 Ukrainian local elections

- 18 Opposition Platform — For Life
- 16 Servant of the People
- 10 Our Land
- 8 European Solidarity
- 7 Proposition
- 5 For the Future

Election date was 25 October 2020

=== 2015 ===
Distribution of seats after the 2015 Ukrainian local elections

- 17 Opposition Bloc
- 15 Solidarity
- 10 Our Land
- 7 Fatherland
- 7 UKROP
- 4 New State
- 4 Revival

Election date was 25 October 2015

== Chairmen ==
=== Regional executive committee ===
- Onufri Stolbun (1937–1938)
- Ivan Filippov (1938–1941, 1943–1944)
- Panteleimon Borisov (1944–1947)
- Stepan Tereshchenko (1947–1949)
- Mikhail Sivolap (1949–1953)
- Ivan Nazarenko (1953–1961)
- Vasily Vednikov (1961–1964)
- Vasily Vednikov (1963–1964, agrarian)
- Vladimir Andrianov (1963–1964, industrial)
- Timofey Barylnik (1964–1967)
- Nikolai Kulish (1967–1975)
- Fyodor Zaivy (1975–1982)
- Viktor Ilyin (1982–1989)
- Ivan Hritsay (1989–1990)
- Mikhail Bashkirov (1990–1991)

=== Regional council ===
- Ivan Hritsay (1990–1994)
- Anatoliy Kinakh (1994–1995)
- Volodymyr Chaika (1995–1996)
- Valentin Chaika (1996–2000)
- Oleksiy Harkusha (2000–2001)
- Mykhailo Moskalenko (2001–2004)
- Oleksiy Harkusha (2004–2005)
- Mykhailo Moskalenko (2005–2006)
- Tetyana Demchenko (2006–2010)
- Ihor Dyatlov (2010–2014)
- Taras Kremin (2014)
- Oleksandr Smirnov (acting, 2014–2015)
- Volodymyr Lusta (2015)
- Viktoria Moskalenko (2015–2020)
- Hanna Zamazieieva (2020–2023)
- Anton Tabunshchik (acting, since 2023)
