= Hanna Zamazieieva =

- Ганна Замазєєва
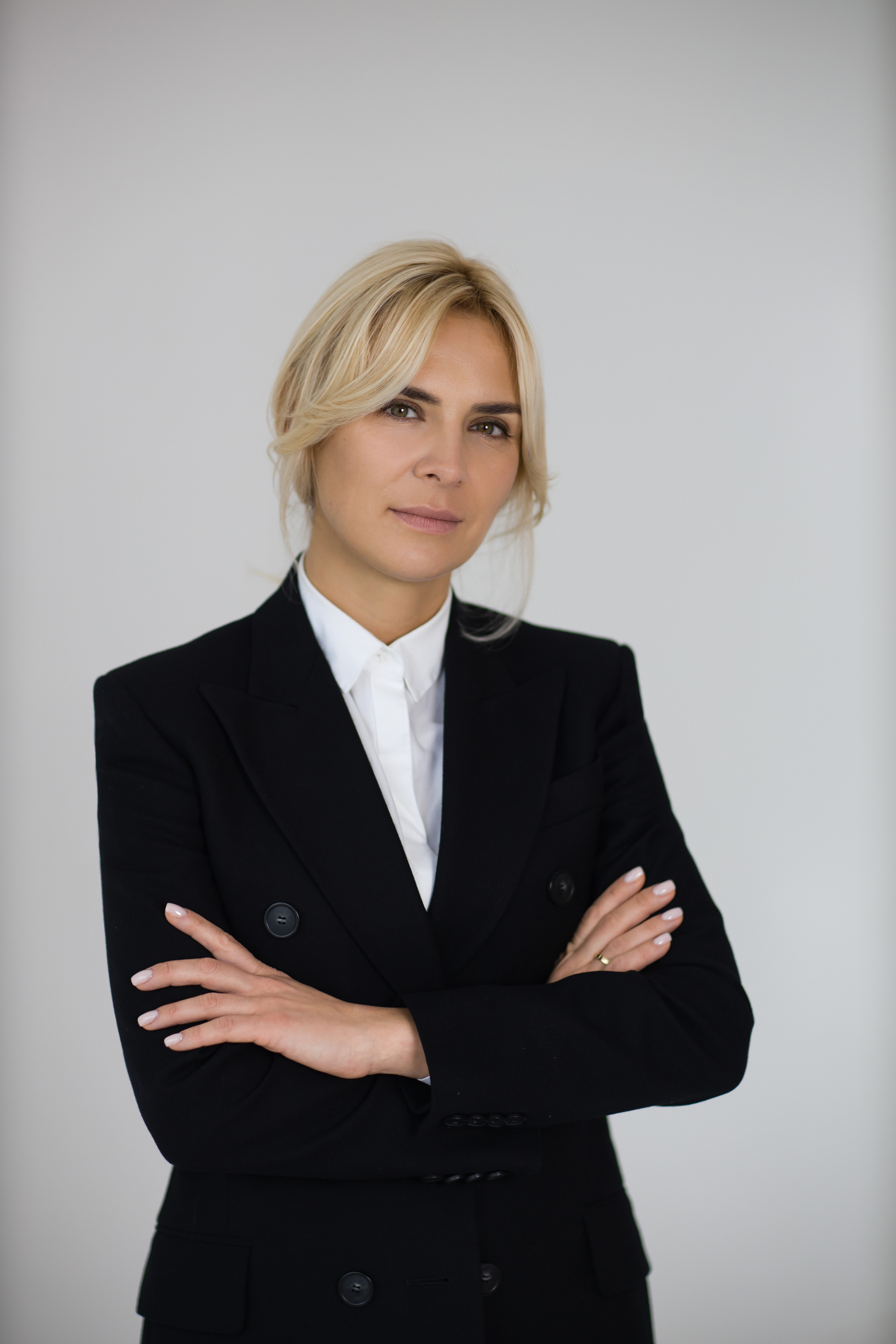

Personal details
- Born: Hanna Volodymyrivna Zamazieieva; October 26, 1980 (age 45) Mykolaiv, Mykolaiv Oblast, Ukrainian SSR, Soviet Union
- Citizenship: Ukraine
- Party: Servant of the People
- Children: 2 (daughter Oleksandryna and son Mykhailo)
- Education: National University of Kyiv-Mohyla Academy; Taras Shevchenko National University of Kyiv; Odesa National Law Academy; European University, Ukraine
- Occupation: Politician • public official
- Awards: Order of Princess Olga, 3rd class

Hanna Volodymyrivna Zamazieieva (Ukrainian: Ганна Володимирівна Замазєєва; born 26 October 1980) is a Ukrainian statesman and the current Head of the State Agency for Energy Efficiency and Energy Saving of Ukraine. She previously served as the Head of the Mykolaiv Oblast Council from 9 December 2020 to 10 March 2023.

== Professional career ==
Zamazieieva's political career began in October 2020, when she was elected as a deputy to the Mykolaiv Regional Council representing the Servant of the People party. On December 9, 2020, she was appointed Head of the Mykolaiv Regional Council.

On 10 March 2023, the Cabinet of Ministers of Ukraine appointed her as the Head of the State Agency for Energy Efficiency and Energy Saving of Ukraine.

== Social and public activities ==
Following the onset of the full-scale Russian invasion in 2022, she founded the Humanitarian Headquarters of the Mykolaiv Region. This organization provides vital aid to the communities most severely affected by the war in the Mykolaiv and Kherson regions.

== Awards ==
- Order of Princess Olga, 3rd class (8 December 2021) — recognized for significant contribution to state building and local self-government.
