= Leonid Topchiy =

Soviet poet, writer, journalist, translator

Leonid Ivanovich Topchiy
- Born: 23 March 1913; Kharkiv, Kharkov Governorate, Russian Empire
- Died: 24 September 1974 (aged 61); Kazan, Tatar Autonomous Soviet Socialist Republic, RSFSR, USSR
- Occupations: Poet; Writer; Journalist; Translator
- Writing career
- Language: Russian
- Years active: 1939–1974
- Genre: Poem
- Notable works: У синего моря (By the Blue Sea, 1940)

Leonid Ivanovich Topchiy (10 March 1913 – 24 September 1974) was a Soviet poet, writer, journalist, and translator from Kharkiv, Kharkov Governorate, Russian Empire, who later lived in Kazan, Tatar Autonomous Soviet Socialist Republic, RSFSR, USSR.

He graduated from the Kharkiv State School of Art. After working various jobs and gaining life experience, he entered the literary field, writing poetry in Russian and publishing two poetry collections. He was a member of the Soviet Writers' Union and served as the head of the sector of the Kharkiv branch of the National Writers' Union of Ukraine. He was published in periodicals. During the Great Patriotic War, he refused to evacuate and remained in Kharkiv, which was soon occupied by the Germans. From 1941 to 1943, he worked for the newspaper Nova Ukraina, published under the occupation authorities, but gradually lost the trust of the editorial board. After the liberation of Kharkiv by Soviet forces in 1944, he was repressed and spent ten years in the Gulag, where he lost an eye. In 1954, he settled in Kazan, where he continued his literary work. He published several poetry collections and translated works by Tatar writers. Topchiy's work is particularly noted for its military lyricism, with his poems often incorporating autobiographical themes. His poetry is confessional, filled with reflections on the state of the country, his personal life, struggles with alcohol, and romantic passions. He died in 1974 after being struck by a police vehicle. His work has not been studied systematically.

== Biography ==
=== Kharkiv, Germans, and the Camp ===
Leonid Ivanovich Topchiy was born on 10 March 1913 in Kharkiv. According to other sources, he was born on February 23, 1913, or in 1914.

He began writing poetry during his school years, and from a young age, he was drawn to music and painting. He graduated from the Kharkiv State School of Art. He worked as an artist, painter, and laborer, which greatly enriched his poetry with insights into the lives and conditions of workers. He wrote in Russian. He was a member of the Soviet Writers' Union and served as head of the sector for working with young authors at the Kharkiv branch of the National Writers' Union of Ukraine. He was a staff member of the newspaper Kharkiv Worker, Young Leninist, and actively published in the Kharkiv Literary Journal. In Kharkiv and Kyiv, he published his first two poetry collections: By the Blue Sea (1940) and Wartime (1941). His works were translated into Ukrainian by T. Masenko and V. Svidzinsky.

My heart foretells disaster,
It tells I'll fall into the clutches
Of the Soviet NKVD,
Or the German Gestapo.

For offending two leaders
With my art.
But honestly, I swear,
I've never seen any of them.

I've never gone out with them
To have some beer neiter//or tea.
I simply spoke the truth,
And for that, I answer.

I said that people die in vain,
The wretched human.
Joseph sends some to their deaths,
While Adolf maims others.

Who else should pity people,
If not a poet?
As for the offended leaders,
I care not a bit.

— L. Topchiy.

After the Great Patriotic War began, Topchiy was named unfit for service in the Red Army due to partial loss of vision (or, according to other sources, flat feet). He did not evacuate from Kharkiv, staying to care for his gravely ill father. During the war, he published in the newspaper Socialist Kharkivshchyna, and the magazines Soviet Ukraine and Perets, contributing patriotic poems, articles, and essays about the "strength of the Russian spirit and arms," asserting that "the beloved city would not fall to the enemy". In 1942, his poem in the collection Battle Songs was set to music by composer S. N. Tartakovsky as the song Cavalry.

After the German occupation of Kharkiv, Topchiy sought to participate actively in the city's literary life, publishing in the newspaper Nova Ukraina under the occupation authorities from 1941 to 1943. Some staff members of newspapers in occupied territories collaborated with the Germans consciously, driven by ideological anti-communist motives, aiming to contribute to the fight against the Stalinist regime and promote ideas of Ukrainian nationalism. Others adapted to circumstances, striving to perform their duties diligently to avoid deportation to Germany or to prove loyalty to the new German authorities and evade punishment for prior pro-Soviet activities. Historians suggest that Topchiy's collaboration with the occupation press was motivated by such pragmatic considerations.

According to Yurii H. Boiko, the poet "hung around the editorial office," but "we didn't trust him, and we were right". The newspaper staff developed a negative attitude toward Topchiy as a Russian-language poet, leading him to stop visiting the editorial office. He was often seen in tattered clothing on city streets, surviving on odd jobs, working as a loader, and painting signs. Soviet literature claimed that Topchiy "lived in the Urals after the war". In reality, in 1944, he was unjustly repressed under Article 58, serving ten years in labor camps for collaborating with German newspapers and writing an unflattering poem about Stalin. He lost his right eye during logging work. According to another account, his eye was struck by a rifle butt by a Red Army soldier during the Soviet entry into Kharkiv.

=== Life in Kazan ===
Topchiy did not blame anyone for what happened to him, living an ordinary life after his release from the camp, still considering himself a son of Ukraine. In 1954, he moved to Kazan. He collaborated with the newspaper Soviet Tataria and the magazine Chayan, the almanac Literary Kazan, and served as a literary consultant for a pioneer newspaper. He translated works from Tatar by A. Ishak, Sh. Mannur, and Dj. Tardjemanov. In 1959, he published his third poetry collection, Poems, released by the Tatar Book Publishing House. He later authored poetry collections such as The Coming Day (1960), My Happiness (1964), Conversation with the Reader (1964), and I Live Not for Myself (1970), published in Kazan and Moscow. According to fellow writers, these books were tiny, the size of a notebook and as thin as a first-grader's exercise book. His poems were also published in the collective collection Under the Russian Sky (1983) and in periodicals. His work received positive reviews from A. T. Tvardovsky and A. V. Smelyakov.

He dreamed of a more complete book, he dreamed... Hardship haunted him, but I don't recall him complaining about any ailment; even a cold didn't touch him, though he wore a lightweight coat and hat in winter, likely not out of bravado, and seemed underdressed in the heat. Frail, all sinew, always coughing lightly to avoid laughing loudly. Once, at a seminar, hearing the poetic complaints of a young, self-satisfied poetess, he said: "No, go chop wood for a neighbor! She smears herself across the mirror like porridge..." This wasn't the harshness of a veteran but the awareness of a worker's duty, a craftsman.

Despite chronic financial problems and personal issues, Topchiy never lost his sense of kindness and hope. He struggled with alcohol, a habit developed during the war, remarking that "only the sick, secret police, and careerists don't drink". He was the subject of numerous anecdotal stories among Kazan's writers, often involving his alcohol-fueled adventures, invariably featuring his head with a pirate-like eyepatch. He was repeatedly detained by the police while intoxicated, but eventually, out of respect for his poetry, they stopped taking him to the station or sobering-up facility, instead driving him home. According to R. A. Mustafin, Topchiy was "a personality who didn't fit into the hypocritical totalitarian era": "Perhaps he drank and caused trouble because he refused to be a conformist. He despised sycophancy and falsehood".

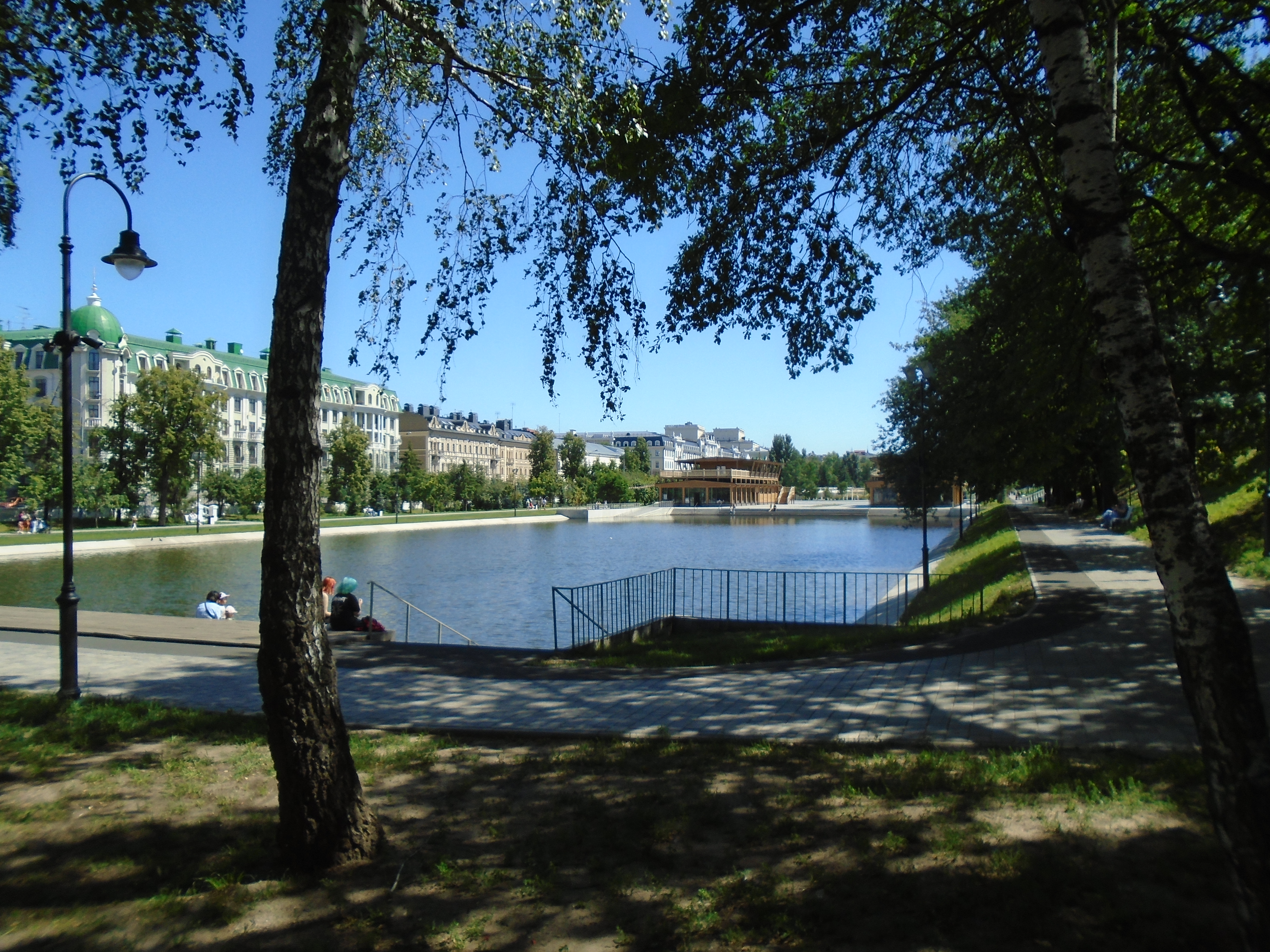
Black Lake, Kazan

Topchiy could often be seen on Bauman Street or in Black Lake Park, writing poetry in a notebook while sitting on a bench. His colorful figure, with a flowing coat, resembled the one-eyed Admiral Nelson. He repeatedly applied to the Writers' Union of the Republic of Tatarstan for creative assignments to the republic's regions to write poems and epics about workers and rural laborers, but his requests were often denied. When his persistent requests were finally granted, he wrote expository pamphlets against local authorities. He recognized no superiors or authorities, criticizing the local writers' organization for "servility to the regional committee". He particularly despised literary careerists, stating: "Knock the official's chair out from under him, and he's nothing, a nobody. But push a poet off a stool, and he remains a poet". After being expelled from the Writers' Union, he repeatedly sought reinstatement, but to no avail. In 1971, alongside writers Y. V. Belostotsky and A. Kh. Taktash, he was questioned by the KGB regarding the distribution of Chronicle of Current Events and samizdat materials in Kazan's literary circles.

Topchiy was tall, sturdy, and lean, with long, sinewy arms and knobby fingers. His face bore poorly healed scars from his time in the camps, and he wore a black eyepatch, resembling Admiral Nelson, in a long, flowing coat, swaying in the wind, wearing his only pair of trousers with stretched knees, cutting a striking figure in Tatarstan's literary community. Despite his appearance, he was well-educated and widely read, knowing S. A. Yesenin by heart, playing the piano, and painting in oils. He also earned money writing epitaphs for gravestones and selling lyrical landscapes. His lifestyle and poetry were similar to those of other Kazan poets G. N. Kapranov and Y. A. Makarov. He was friends with war veteran writers T. K. Zhuravlyov, G. A. Paushkin, and V. I. Kostrigin. Topchiy was married to Valentina Ivanovna (née Denisova) and had a daughter, Marina (born 1956), who, according to her, was kept unaware of her father's identity as a poet, as he feared his lifestyle might harm her. He later lived in a de facto marriage with poetess Yuliya Bader-Dubyago, who was also repressed. He resided at Galeev Street, house no. 8.

Now, few people mention his name in conversation. But there was a time when you could meet Leonid Ivanovich Topchiy on Bauman Street almost every day. I saw him as someone who had endured much, and thus unpretentious, yet with his "quails" tucked under his arm. He bore the cross of his fate lightly, not burdening others. "Lightly" is a deceptive word, for he looked like a gaunt old man with bumps and healed bruises. In essence, he depended on no one. He could vanish and melt away like a sudden snow cloud, reappear elsewhere, and take root. His ability to live anywhere shone through his wanderer's skin. From time to time, he painted simple oil landscapes. For whom? Why? He could have composed music if an instrument were at hand. But paper and pen, the most essential and unassuming tools, proved most suitable for heartfelt conversation.

=== Death and legacy ===
Leonid Topchiy died on September 24, 1974, in Kazan. Ten days earlier, on September 14, he was struck by a police vehicle near Vostaniya Street. Intoxicated and without documents, he was mistaken for a homeless person and taken to a hospital. Before his death, Topchiy briefly regained consciousness, and after days of searching, Bader-Dubyago found him, allowing him to bid her farewell. According to other accounts, he was hit by an ambulance or a sobering-up facility van. His funeral was held on September 27, organized with the help of the Writers' Union, represented by M. D. Zaretsky and Y. V. Belostotsky. His daughter saw her father for the first time only at his funeral. He was buried at Arskoe Cemetery. According to colleagues, his life ended tragically, as he lived, without receiving rehabilitation as a victim of repression.

Most of Topchiy's poems remained unpublished during his lifetime due to Soviet censorship. His third and final Kazan collection, My Golden Autumn, was published posthumously in 1983. In 1993, he was posthumously rehabilitated due to the efforts of his daughter, Marina Rakhmatullina, who received official notification from Kyiv. For about thirty years, Topchiy's manuscripts were carefully preserved by his friend, poet R. Kutuy, in a pre-war leatherette suitcase at his home.

In 2003, the poetry collection Resurrection was published by the publishing house of the magazine Kazan. The book was edited by Topchiy's daughter, who compiled all known manuscripts and published works, deciphered his handwriting and obscure passages, presenting the most significant part of her father's creative legacy, reflecting his worldview and understanding of historical events. Topchiy did not seek fame during his lifetime. He left behind hundreds of poems, dozens of epics, and translations, but his work has not been comprehensively analyzed and remains understudied by literary scholars.

== Poetry ==
=== Wars and poetry ===
For twenty years I stood on a pedestal,
Then one day the sergeant-major went
To see what people had become,
How his family and wife now lived.
He approached the abandoned house,
Knocked on the cherished window,
But his wife was setting the table for another,
Confused, for he hadn’t been there in so long,
Dead, yet suddenly standing there.
Trouble's brewing. Yet it sank in.
"It's alright," he said, "live in peace,
It's hard for lonely women.
I'm dead, made of stone,
I'm memory. Respect him, the living one.
I see you live with the old folks,
Don't mistreat my elders."
[...]
"I see you have kind souls,
So I didn’t fight in vain." —
And he left. Listened to an accordion in the village
And calmly returned to the pedestal.

— Monument, L. Topchiy

Leonid Topchiy's poems are largely autobiographical and confessional, reflecting the poet's complex life path, his perception of reality, and his contradictory personality, allowing readers to understand his worldview. His poetry is an Encyclopedia of Life, exploring love, betrayal, pride, the search for meaning, loss of bearings, physical and spiritual ailments, vices, and sins. The lyrical hero is a soldier of the Great Patriotic War, a worker of the post-war years, and the poet's artistic double, through whom Topchiy reveals ideological and psychological similarities, flamboyance, a zest for life, and respect for freedom. In poems about the homeland, Topchiy continues the traditions of Yesenin's poetry, celebrating nature with fervor and strength of feeling, addressing the common working people. He wrote candidly about camp life, rejecting conformism, as seen in lines: "It seems to me there won't be an announcement, / Underlined in red from top to bottom, / That tomorrow morning, on Sunday, / Communism will arrive in Russia."

War occupies a central place in Topchiy's work, though he did not fight in battles, having "equated the pen to the bayonet". Notable works of military poetry include Birch, "Monument," "Don't Forget…," and "Accordion," distinguished by simple melodiousness and piercing intonation. Topchiy depicts war as a merciless disease, and his heroes, part of the "Lost Generation," suffer from loneliness, emptiness, and pain, often turning to alcohol. He expresses confidence that people are born for happiness, with ordinary soldiers as the true heroes of war, their understanding of it akin to Tolstoyan ideals.

In the poem "Fili," war is shown through the eyes of a child observing Kutuzov's military council: "The girl watched from the stove, / Barely overcoming her fear." Topchiy emphasizes the suffering of children, forced to mature and starve, yet offers hope for victory: "The Fatherland has emerged / From darkness more than once." In "The Candle Stub Burns," he portrays soldiers' lives between battles: "The candle stub burns, / Their crosses gleam." Faith, songs, and alcohol help them forget war's horrors, with intertextual parallels to Fatyanov's We Haven't Been Home in So Long, linking two patriotic wars. In "Old Veteran," the tragedy of a legless war returnee is depicted: "Crutches aren't legs, / The pension's pennies." Society disrespects the veteran, leaving him in poverty, with alcohol as his only solace.

The Russian soul wept within Topchiy's poetry is marked by a broken rhythm, unconventional word combinations, artistic sound patterns, and tropes (epithets, metaphors, antitheses), creating a timeless poetic world. Time and space often merge into infinity, with poem dates rarely specified, emphasizing their universality. Topchiy considered it a misfortune that many poems were censored, yet he remained truthful, denouncing tyranny under Hitler and Stalin. In "My Heart Foretells Trouble…" (1941), he boldly criticized both leaders, and after Stalin's removal from the mausoleum, wrote: "You crows and magpies, don't touch the dead eagle." His post-war dream is captured in: "And now the world is at / Peace and grace."

Topchiy's lyricism blends informativeness (intellectuality, precise knowledge) and psychologism (emotions, sensory connection), using antitheses for confessional depth. In his cycle about his mother's death, he speaks of life through death, using varied verb tenses ("wept," "prepare," "sing") to affirm the need to keep living. Autumn dominates his poetry as a symbol of maturity, with dark blue hues evoking early twilight, cold, and calm.

{{quote|Leonid Topchiy, neither in life nor poetry, struck the pose of a sullen, rejected man. He loved life with the optimism of a healthy heart, preferring companionship to solitude. He avoided ornate metaphors, recreating the soul's image with "prosaic" words, striving for the truth of feeling. He could not think ill of his hero, elevating him above mundane life: "We are all drafts for future people".

=== Confession ===
Spoon — knife,
So what?
Spoon — little fork.
On the table lies sprat
Next to anchovy.
Semolina porridge,
Foggy night,
It drained me, wore me out,
The cursed thing.
Enough, brothers, feasting,
Eating beef.
The dancer got fifteen years
Of sentence.
The accordionist and singer
A bit less —
They ended up at war
Surrounded.
Hey, guys,
Widen the circle.
Where are the girls?
Without girls.
And they went to and fro
Staggering.
Rejoice, my soul,
Yet I want to cry.

— Banquet, L. Topchiy

The primary subject of Leonid Topchiy's lyricism is the physical and spiritual ailments of the main hero. Critics highlight the poem titled Confession, in which the poet does not repent his sins before God, stating, "religion doesn't touch me, since childhood I've been steeped in sin." The poem belongs to the author's lyricism and is a confessional monologue of a lonely poet, a portrait of a creative personality weary of disappointments, a weak person with a "tearful gaze," choosing marginality and épater as forms of social protest. In describing his spiritual ailments, which developed into physical and social illness, the poet employs his personal motif of drunkenness, intoxication, and oblivion, which becomes a central theme of the work. Topchiy, through his lyrical hero, suggests that alcohol consumption leads to self-realization as a poet, as "if not for wine, but only kvass, / There'd be no poet, no tale." He posits that "wine, which elevates the soul, is inseparable from poetry," with the hero transforming, escaping aggression and discontent into a sublime reality, marked by words like "I melt" and "I blur," and lofty epithets for wine such as "elevating" and "bright." Following J. G. Byron, A. S. Pushkin, A. A. Blok, and V. S. Vysotsky in the motif of creative intoxication, Topchiy's lyrical hero admits that alcohol is salvation from mundanity and boredom, for "an excess of feelings, joy, inspiration / Good wine brings us."

Drunkenness may reflect the poet's protest against the unjust structure of the state and social inequality. Having lived through the 1917 Revolution, Topchiy confesses: "I didn't need a Constitution, / I was neither poor nor rich, / I didn't want war or revolution / And am guilty before no one." He notes that the emergence of the new state did not improve the people's lives, he himself failed to thrive in this political system, many dream of "foreign goods" but lack the means to buy them, and the Bolshevik slogan "Freedom, Equality, Brotherhood" only produced new "masters" who parade "lordly exits in the guise of cars" amidst poverty. The hero sees himself as a materially disadvantaged "simpleton," unable to change anything, wearing "old trousers" and a "worn jacket." Realizing that poetry brings no material wealth, the sixtist poet continues his beloved craft, rebelling through drunkenness, his own tool of social struggle. Having given all earnings to his parents since childhood, never having means for a comfortable life, Topchiy rethinks the revolution, asserting through his hero that appearance doesn't matter: "As long as the word ‘comrade' exists, who cares about master".

The poet always sought connection with people, dreamed of being useful, helped aspiring poets, and longed for family happiness, making the theme of love a significant part of Confession. His first true love was stolen by a "jerk," a math teacher: "Far away faded the white apron, / Clouding my tearful gaze, / Leaving me with a photograph, / Cherished to this day." Later, Topchiy's hero frequently fell in love, faced disappointments, and experienced unrequited love, never recapturing that first feeling, which played a fateful role in his life. The motif of grievances and hurts related to love recurs in his work; his hero avenges women "for boyish longing," embarking on adultery: "Kissing wives, they're to blame themselves, / Young, beautiful, damn them, / I mocked their husbands, / Old, sated men." Having abandoned his lawful wife, who bore him a daughter, Marina, Topchiy never forgave himself, with guilt haunting his life. He states that "the magnet of words and bitter wine / Parted us for long," but I live, not forgetting you, / My daughter, like a dream." The poet considered his daughter his greatest achievement, though he rarely saw her, ashamed of his lifestyle and unwilling to interfere. Unable to participate in her upbringing, before his death, Topchiy wrote "To My Daughter Instead of a Letter," addressing Marina with love and hope. In Confession, he seeks forgiveness: "And when my life counts out my years / And the end comes, / Beyond the title of poet, / Simply call me: father." Topchiy seems to foresee his end, as Marina truly discovered her father's work only after his death.

The hero, through the poet, assures readers that as a creative personality, he cannot live otherwise. Critics note that the poem's central figure is a sick individual, whose illness stems from low political and social status, leading to profound spiritual ailment and ultimately rebellion. The hero repents, wishes to rewrite his life, though acknowledges its impossibility. The hero's active nature and desire for change are expressed through disyllabic iamb, conveying both the poet's turmoil and the fleetingness of time, the necessity of confession, and repentance for deeds. The surrounding world is crafted with epithets like "vile potion," "multicolored banners," "rebellious, burning, red color," "yellow-mouthed dames," "lecherous hands," "unbloomed rose. The poet's inner world is revealed through verbal metaphors ("the due hour will chill and stop the blood," "I gathered scraps only from a generous table," "the soul of words is captive"). Thus, the poem presents two contrasting worlds – a turbulent poetic one and an indifferent reality, with the poet expressing hatred for vulgar surroundings while revealing the lyrical hero's pursuit of purification. Confession, despite its candor, is not Topchiy's final work but reinforces his confidence that he will be heard and understood.

=== Lost Little Paradise ===
The poem Lost Little Paradise extends Topchiy's confessional lyricism, portraying "paradise" as spiritual and physical unity for a "little person." Written as an epistolary poem, it has three parts: the hero's past, redemption in "paradise," and return to reality. Once hectic, the hero seeks peace, rejecting societal roles. Though married, he pursues women, confessing: "If you love, love openly." His inner world is revealed through repetitions ("or rather," "as if"), emphasizing emotion over reason. Love is "eternally young" and "ancient": "It came and didn't ask: / Who are we, what?" Alcohol was an escape for him: "I loved and used to drink much wine, / But… / Never drank under a blanket." Love heals his dependency, but he regrets time lost to drinking. Time is cyclical, marked by "March, first year." The "little paradise" is a secluded "two-window house" with a garden of apple trees, parsley, and dill: "It looks like a chicken's estate, / But it's mine." Paradise is naturalness, with "no locks or bolts."

In the "little paradise", the hero heals but remains lonely, unmasked. Love destroys this "paradise," like the Fall of Adam. In the third part ("March, second year"), he bids farewell to his lover out of pity for his wife: "You must sacrifice your feeling / To the one who loves." He regrets: "I now see I traded gold / For pennies." In the postscript, the "paradise" is locked, yet he dreams of returning. Loneliness grows as his wife, alien to his poetry, misunderstands him. He breaks his word, returning to the "paradise" where "all is dear and close," rejecting hypocrisy: "Come in, feel at home." Struggling with professional failure, he seeks meaning in "paradise," confessing without expecting forgiveness, growing spiritually.

== Bibliography ==
=== In Ukrainian ===
- Kravchenko, H. O. (1960). Kravchenko, H. O. (ed.). Художня література, видана на Україні за 40 років, 1917—1957 [Fiction Published in Ukraine Over 40 Years, 1917–1957] (in Ukrainian). Vol. 2: Russian Fiction, Literature of Other Peoples of the USSR, Literature of Foreign Countries. Kharkiv: Publishing House of the Book Chamber of the Ukrainian SSR. p. 540.
- Boiko, Yurii H. (1974). Вибране [Selected Works] (in Ukrainian). Vol. II. Munich: Ukrainian Publishing House "Dniprova Khvylia". p. 412.
- Rybalchenko, Rostyslav K. (2003). "Муза несповнених надій" [Muse of Unfulfilled Hopes]. In Morozko, L. H. (ed.). Культурна спадщина Слобожанщини: збірка наукових статей за матеріалами міжнародної наукової конференції «П'яті Слобожанські читання» [Cultural Heritage of Slobozhanshchyna: Collection of Scientific Articles Based on the Materials of the International Scientific Conference "Fifth Slobozhanshchyna Readings"]. Section "Art Studies and Cultural Studies" (in Ukrainian). Kharkiv: Kursor. p. 106. ISBN 9667810437.
- Rybalchenko, Rostyslav K. (2005). "Топчій Леонід Іванович" [Topchii Leonid Ivanovych]. Харківська культурна еміграція 1942—1943 років [Kharkiv Cultural Emigration of 1942–1943] (in Ukrainian). Kharkiv: Kursor. pp. 130–131, 187. ISBN 9789667810733.
- Tytarenko, Dmytro M. (2006). Людський фактор в окупаційній періодичній пресі Східної України (1941—1943 рр.) [The Human Factor in the Occupation Periodical Press of Eastern Ukraine (1941–1943)]. History (in Ukrainian). Kharkiv: Unknown.

=== In Russian ===
- Smirnov, Dmitry A., ed. (1963). Под Российским небом: коллективный сборник стихов [Under the Russian Sky: Collective Collection of Poems] (in Russian). Moscow: Sovetskaya Rossiya Publishing House. p. 183.
- `Хроника текущих событий. Суд над Владимиром Буковским [Chronicle of Current Events. The Trial of Vladimir Bukovsky] (PDF) (in Russian). Frankfurt: Posev Publishing House. 1972. p. 142.`
- Khillig, G.; Marochko, V. (1997). Свидетельства искренней дружбы: воспоминания К. С. Кононенко о А. С. Макаренко [Testimonies of Sincere Friendship: K. S. Kononenko's Memoirs about A. S. Makarenko] (in Russian). Marburg: Marburg University. p. 114. ISBN 978-3-8185-0243-0.
- Khasanov, M. (1998). Топчий Леонид Иванович [Topchiy Leonid Ivanovich]. Tatar Encyclopedic Dictionary (in Russian). Kazan: Institute of Tatar Encyclopedia, Academy of Sciences of the Republic of Tatarstan. p. 580. ISBN 0953065030.
- Gazizova, Liliya R., ed. (2005). Как время катится в Казани золотое…: антология русской поэзии Казани, 1940—2005 [How Time Rolls Golden in Kazan...: Anthology of Russian Poetry of Kazan, 1940–2005] (in Russian). Kazan: Tatar Book Publishing House. pp. 424–431. ISBN 5298041787.
- Akhmetyev, Ivan A., ed. (2010). Русские стихи 1950–2000 годов. Антология (первое приближение): в двух томах [Russian Poems 1950–2000. Anthology (First Approximation): In Two Volumes] (in Russian). Vol. 1. Moscow: Letniy Sad. p. 920. ISBN 9785988561118.
- Lukin, B. (2016). Война и мир. Антология: Великая Отечественная война (1941—1945) в русской поэзии XX-XXI вв.: в десяти томах [War and Peace. Anthology: The Great Patriotic War (1941–1945) in Russian Poetry of the 20th–21st Centuries: In Ten Volumes] (PDF) (in Russian). Vol. V: T–Ya (Authors Born Before 1927). Tyumen: Tyumen Publishing House. p. 600. ISBN 9785928803162.
- Aynutdinov, Rais A.; Gilazev, Zufar Z., eds. (2018). Казанская периодика XIX-XXI вв.: энциклопедический справочник для представителей средств массовых коммуникаций [Kazan Periodicals of the 19th–21st Centuries: Encyclopedic Reference for Media Representatives] (PDF) (in Russian). Kazan: Tatar Book Publishing House. p. 197. ISBN 9785298036955.
- Sysoeva, I. V.; Koryukova, I. I., eds. (2020). Ноты, опалённые войной: указатель нот, изданных в годы Великой Отечественной войны (из фондов СОУНБ им. В. Г. Белинского) [Notes Scorched by War: Index of Sheet Music Published During the Great Patriotic War (from the Collections of the V. G. Belinsky Sverdlovsk Regional Universal Scientific Library)] (PDF) (in Russian). Yekaterinburg: Sverdlovsk Regional Universal Scientific Library named after V. G. Belinsky. p. 128.
- Akhunova, Nailya G. (2018). Чёрная бабочка: эссе и миниатюры [Black Butterfly: Essays and Miniatures] (in Russian). Kazan: Tatar Book Publishing House. p. 111. ISBN 9785298035675.
- Bader-Dubyago, Yuliya V. (1998). Рояля выбитый клавиш… [The Broken Key of the Piano…] (PDF). Kazan (Magazine) (in Russian). Казань: Журнал "Казань". p. 136.
- Balashov, Yuriy A. (2003). Доброе сердце поэта [The Kind Heart of the Poet]. Kazan (Magazine) (in Russian). Kazan: Журнал "Казань". p. 74.
- Bozhkova, Galina N. (2014). Художественная антитеза как средство создания образа лирического героя в поэтическом наследии Л. И. Топчия [Artistic Antithesis as a Means of Creating the Image of the Lyrical Hero in the Poetic Legacy of L. I. Topchiy] (PDF). Journal "Philological Sciences. Issues of Theory and Practice" (in Russian). Vol. 1. Tambov: Gramota Publishing House. pp. 45–47. ISSN 1997-2911.
- Bozhkova, Galina N.; Saushkina, Anastasiya I. (2017). "Пороки и недуги лирического героя в поэме казанского поэта Л. И. Топчия «Потерянный мини-рай»" [Vices and Ailments of the Lyrical Hero in the Poem by Kazan Poet L. I. Topchiy "Lost Mini-Paradise"]. Development of the creative potential of a person and society: materials of the V international scientific conference on January 17—18, 2017 (PDF) (in Russian). Prague: Sociosphera-CZ Scientific Publishing Center. pp. 88–95. ISBN 9788075261649.
- Danilov, Ivan I. (2014). "В русле памяти нам никаких не воздвигнуть плотин!" ["In the Stream of Memory, We Cannot Build Any Dams!"] (PDF). Kazan Almanac (in Russian). Kazan: Казанский альманах. pp. 25–56.
- Karimullin, Abrar G. (1962). Татарская литература в переводах на русский язык: библиографический указатель, 1917–1960 [Tatar Literature in Russian Translations: Bibliographic Index, 1917–1960] (in Russian). Kazan: Kazan University Publishing House. p. 89.
- Lavrishko, Vladimir N. (2003). Занозы в памяти [Splinters in Memory]. Kazan (Magazine) (in Russian). Kazan: Журнал "Казань". pp. 70–83.
- Leron, Lyabib (2013). Стихотворное заявление [Poetic Statement] (PDF). Kazan Almanac (in Russian). Kazan: Казанский альманах. pp. 155–157.
- Matsuev, Nikolay I. (1952). Советская художественная литература и критика, 1938—1948: библиография [Soviet Fiction and Criticism, 1938–1948: Bibliography] (in Russian). Moscow: Sovetsky Pisatel Publishing House. p. 434.
- Monser, A.; Mushinsky, A. (2008). Леонид Топчий. Я в стихах предпочитаю прозу [Leonid Topchiy. I Prefer Prose in Poems] (PDF). Kazan Almanac (in Russian). Kazan: Казанский альманах. pp. 98–108.
- Mustafin, Rafael A. (2006). "А он писал стихи от злости… (Леонид Топчий)" [And He Wrote Poems Out of Anger… (Leonid Topchiy)]. Силуэты. Литературные портреты писателей Татарстана [Silhouettes. Literary Portraits of Writers of Tatarstan] (PDF) (in Russian). Kazan: Tatar Book Publishing House. pp. 292–300. ISBN 5298039324.
- Mustafin, Vil S. (2010). Khasanov, Mansur Kh. (ed.). Топчий Леонид Иванович [Topchiy Leonid Ivanovich]. Tatar Encyclopedia (in Russian). Vol. 5: R–T. Kazan: Institute of Tatar Encyclopedia, Academy of Sciences of the Republic of Tatarstan. p. 660. ISBN 9785902375074.
- Prokhorova, Mariya S.; Bozhkova, Galina N. (2015). Виды хронотопов в сборнике стихов Л. И. Топчия «Воскрешение» [Types of Chronotopes in L. I. Topchiy's Poetry Collection "Resurrection"] (PDF). Journal "Philological Sciences. Issues of Theory and Practice" (in Russian). Vol. 2. Tambov: Gramota Publishing House. pp. 163–165. ISSN 1997-2911.
- Saushkina, Anastasiya I.; Bozhkova, Galina N. (2016). "Пороки и недуги в поэме казанского поэта Л. И. Топчия «Исповедь»" [Vices and Ailments in the Poem by Kazan Poet L. I. Topchiy "Confession"] (PDF). Приоритетные направления развития науки и образования: материалы X Международной научно–практической конференции (Чебоксары, 16 октября 2016 г.) [Priority Directions for the Development of Science and Education: Materials of the X International Scientific-Practical Conference (Cheboksary, October 16, 2016)] (PDF) (in Russian). Cheboksary: Interactive Plus Scientific Cooperation Center. pp. 107–111. ISSN 2411-9652.
- Saushkina, Anastasiya I.; Bozhkova, Galina N. (2017). Образ лирического героя в лиро-эпических произведениях казанского поэта Л. И. Топчия [The Image of the Lyrical Hero in the Lyrical-Epic Works of Kazan Poet L. I. Topchiy] (PDF). Journal "Alley of Science" (in Russian). Tomsk: Quantum Publishing Center. pp. 236–239. ISSN 2587-6244.
- Saushkina, Anastasiya I. (2018). "Военная лирика Л. И. Топчия" [Military Lyrics of L. I. Topchiy]. Научные исследования и разработки — 2018: XXXIV Международная научно-практическая конференция (Москва, 23 марта 2018 г.) [Scientific Research and Development — 2018: XXXIV International Scientific-Practical Conference (Moscow, March 23, 2018)] (in Russian). Moscow: Olimp Publishing House. pp. 37–39. ISBN 9785604064030.
- Startsev, Ivan I. (1961). Детская литература. Библиография: 1958—1960 [Children's Literature. Bibliography: 1958–1960] (in Russian). Moscow: Molodaya Gvardiya Publishing House. p. 647.
- Ucharov, Eduard R. (2018). "Памятник Леониду Топчию" [Monument to Leonid Topchiy]. Стиходворения: стихи, проза, эссе [Poetry: Poems, Prose, Essays] (in Russian). Kazan: Academy of Sciences of the Republic of Tatarstan Publishing House. pp. 245–249. ISBN 9785969004856.
