= Lyuba Yakimchuk =

Ukrainian poet, playwright, and screenwriter

Lyuba Yakimchuk, also known as Lyubov Yakymchuk (Ukrainian: Любов Якимчук; born 1985), is a Ukrainian poet, playwright, and screenwriter, living in Kyiv, Ukraine. Her work includes Apricots of Donbas (2015).

== Early life and education ==
Yakimchuk was born and raised in Pervomaisk, Luhansk Oblast, a small coal-mining town near Luhansk in Ukraine's industrial east.

She graduated from the University of Luhansk and the National University of Kyiv-Mohyla Academy.

== Life and work ==
Having moved to Kyiv, Yakimchuk visited her parents at their family home in Pervomaisk in 2014, when the town came under the control of Russian-backed forces during the War in Donbas.Her parents and sister became internally displaced persons. Yakimchuk's book of poems, Apricots of Donbas, focuses on that time and the conflict in the area. Maria G. Rewakowicz wrote in the Los Angeles Review of Books that "Both [Serhiy] Zhadan and Yakimchuk come from the conflict-ridden Donbas and, even though they no longer live there, have emerged as the region's trusted spokespersons."

Her play The Wall was produced at the Ivan Franko National Academic Drama Theater in Kyiv. She wrote the script for the film "Slovo" House: Unfinished Novel (2021), about Ukrainian artists living in the Slovo Building, persecuted by the totalitarian system, against the backdrop of the Holodomor.

As of 2022 Yakimchuk lives to the north of Kyiv with her husband, and their 11-year-old son. However, due to the 2022 Russian invasion of Ukraine, for the first month her son resided with relatives. During the invasion, Yakimchuk managed to travel to speak at cultural events in Paris, Warsaw, and St Andrews, and intends to return to Kyiv. At the 2022 Grammy Awards, she performed her poem "Prayer" in English as part of John Legend's performance of his song "Free"; they were joined by Ukrainian artists Siuzanna Iglidan and Mika Newton. Abbey White, for The Hollywood Reporter, highlighted:

Legend's performance featured a chorus and a backdrop of images from the crisis in Ukraine, as well as a segment from Lyuba Yakimchuk [...]. In a take on The Lord's Prayer, Yakimchuk described "parents whose house is in the line of fire and who won’t abandon it like a tomb," and said of our daily bread, "give to the hungry." "And forgive us our destroyed cities even though we do not forgive for them our enemies," she continued. "Shoot and protect my husband, my parents, my child and my motherland."

== Publications ==
=== Books of poetry by Yakimchuk ===
- , як МОДА (Iak Moda) = Like Fashion. Lviv: Kamenyar, 2009. ISBN 9789666070688. In Ukrainian.
- Apricots of Donbas
  - Абрикоси Донбасу(Abrykosy Donbasu). Lviv: Old Lion, 2015. ISBN 9786176791355. In Ukrainian.
  - Morele Donbass. Poznań, Poland: Provincial Public Library and Culture Animation Center, 2018. Polish-language version.
  - Donbassi Aprikoosid. Allikaäärne, 2019. ISBN 9789949724475. Translated by Mathura. Estonian-language version.
  - Apricots of Donbas. Lost Horse Press Contemporary Ukrainian Poetry. Sandpoint, ID: Lost Horse, 2021. ISBN 978-1-7364323-1-0. English translation by Oksana Maksymchuk, Max Rosochinsky, and Svetlana Lavochkina. With an essay by Yakimchuk ("Reaching a Common Language") and an introduction by Maksymchuk and Rosochinsky. English-language version.
  - Aprikoser i Donbas. Stockholm, Sweden: Nirstedt/litteratur, 2023. Swedish-language version, translated by Ida Börjel and Nils Håkanson.
  - Les Abricots du Donbas. Paris, France: Éditions des femmes — Antoinette Fouque, 2023. French-language version, translated from Ukrainian by Iryna Dmytrychyn and Agathe Bonin. Bilingual Ukrainian–French edition.
  - Donbasa aprikozes. Riga, Latvia: Orbīta, 2025. Latvian-language version, translated by Ingmāra Balode, Māra Poļakova and Māris Salējs.
  - Meruňky Donbasu. Prague, Czech Republic: Fra, 2025. Czech-language version, translated by Alexej Sevruk.
  - Donbaszi sárgabarackok. Budapest, Hungary: Prae Kiadó, 2026. Hungarian-language version, translated by Vonnák Diána.
- Виробництво ніжності / Produkcja czułości. Sejny, Poland: Pogranicze, 2023. Ukrainian–Polish bilingual edition, translated into Polish by Aneta Kamińska. ISBN 978-83-66143-79-1. National Library of Ukraine catalogue.

=== In English-language poetry anthologies ===
- The Frontier: 28 Contemporary Ukrainian Poets: An Anthology. Glagoslav, 2018. Edited and translated from the Ukrainian by Anatoly Kudryavitsky. ISBN 978-1911414490.
- The White Chalk of Days: The Contemporary Ukrainian Literature Series Anthology. Academic Studies, 2018. Edited by Marko Andryczyk. ISBN 978-1618116611.
- Words for War: New Poems from Ukraine. Boston: Academic Studies, 2017. Co-edited by Oksana Maksymchuk and Max Rosochinsky.

=== In other publications ===
- Ukraine: Stop Tanks with Books. Nazraeli, 2022. Photographs by Mark Neville with short stories by Yakimchuk. Edited by David Campany. ISBN 978-1-59005-564-9.

== See also ==
- List of Ukrainian-language poets
- List of Ukrainian literature translated into English
