= Dmytro Kremin =

Ukrainian poet (1953–2019)

Dmytro Kremin Дмитро Кремінь
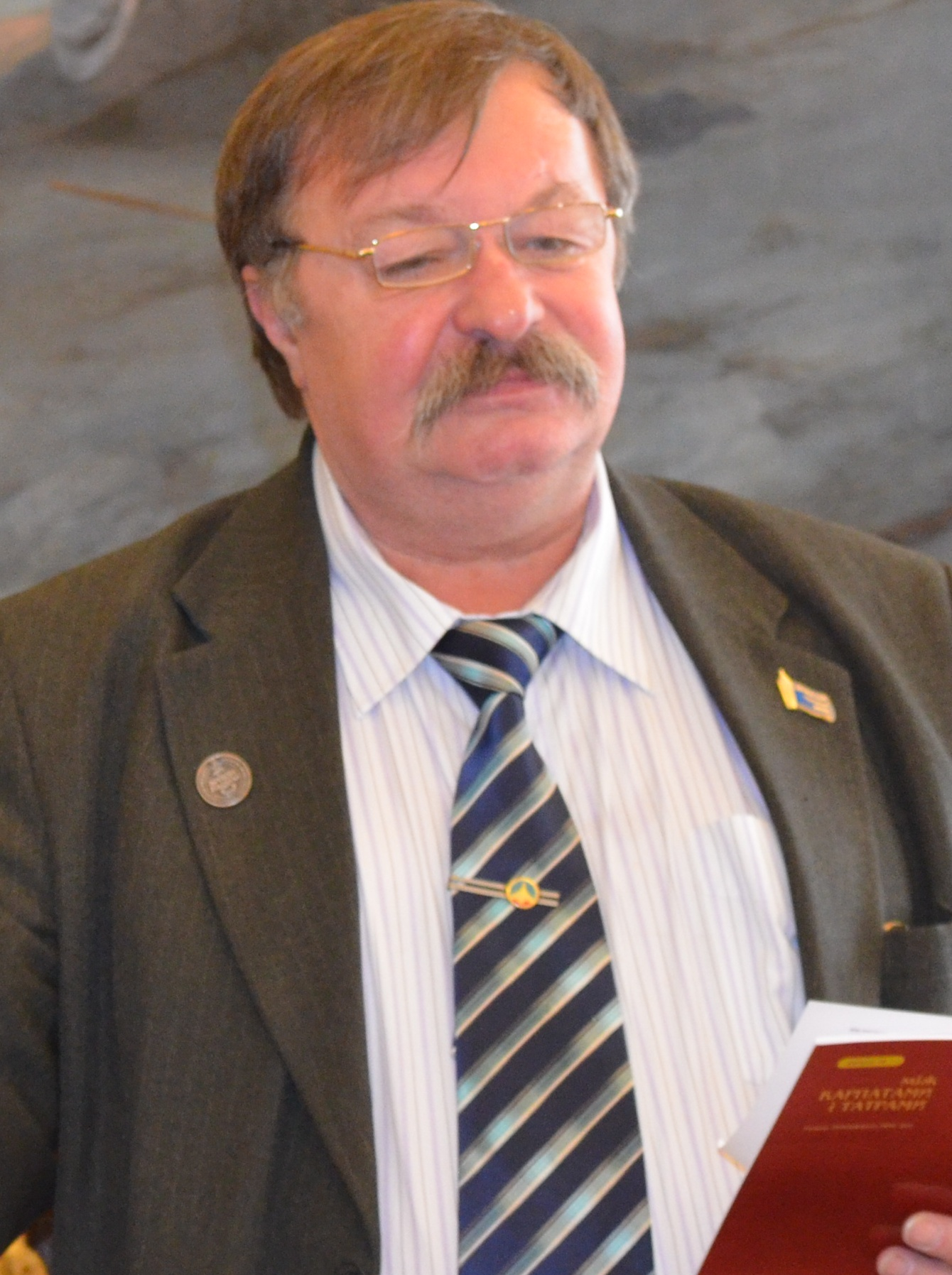
- Born: 21 August 1953; Irshava, Ukraine
- Died: 25 May 2019 (aged 65); Mykolaiv, Ukraine
- Education: Uzhhorod National University
- Occupations: Poet, essayist, journalist, translator
- Writing career
- Language: Ukrainian
- Genres: Poetry, essay, translation, song lyric
- Notable awards: Taras Shevchenko National Literary Prize, 1999; Honored Worker of Arts of Ukraine, 2016

Dmytro Dmytrovych Kremin (Ukrainian: Дмитро Дмитрович Кремінь; 21 August 1953 – 25 May 2019) was a Ukrainian poet, journalist, translator, and scholar. Kremin was one of the laureates of The Taras Shevchenko National Literary Prize in 1999, for the book of poems called Pectoral.

== Biography ==
Dmytro Kremin was born on 21 August 1953 in the village of Suha in the Irshava district of Transcarpathia (Zakarpattia region), Ukraine. He graduated with degree in Philology from the Uzhhorod National University in 1975. After graduation, he went to work in the town of Kazanka in the Mykolaiv region as a school teacher of Russian Language and Literature, and then of Ukrainian Language and Literature. Later, he worked for the Kazanka district newspaper.

In 1979, Kremin moved with his wife Olha and a one-year-old son Taras to the city of Mykolaiv, which became a second home to the poet. There, he took a position of a professor for the Ukrainian Literature Department at the V.G.Belinskii National Pedagogical Institute of Mykolaiv (1979–1981). At this time, he served as the head of the Regional Literary Studio Dzherela ("Sources"). From 1981–1990 he was one of the department heads for the region’s biggest youth newspaper Leninske Plemia ("Lenin's Young Followers"). From 1991–2008, he was the editor second to the editor-in-chief as well as the head of the Culture and Spirituality department for the newspaper Ridne Prybuzhzhia ("Native Prybuzhzhia"), the main newspaper of the Mykolaiv regional government. From 2010 to the present he has been the head of the Mykolaiv Branch of the National Writers' Union of Ukraine and the editor-in-chief for the magazine Soborna Vulytsia ("Cathedral Street").

Kremin's poetry debut was in his student years on the pages of the literary journal Vitryla ("Sails") in 1970-1971. Later, there were publications in the magazine Ranok ("Morning") and in the Zakarpathian Komsomol press, and active participation in the work of a literary group at the Zakarpathian Branch of The National Writers' Union of Ukraine, membership in the editors' committee for this group as an editor in the poetry publications department, and contact and friendship with well-known figures in Transcarpathian literature who were central to the artistic life of the region—Petro Skunts, Ivan Chendei, and Felix Kryvin. At that time, Dmytro Kremin was acquainted with Vasyl Gusti, who introduced him to the poets' circles of the University, and to Mykola Matola, Ivan Petrovtsii, Petro Keshelia, Yosyp Kleiman, V. Demydov, A. Stepanian, Y. Zhelitski, and G. Fodor.

Kremin is holder of the honorary title The Honored Worker of Arts of Ukraine (2016), a member of The National Writers' Union of Ukraine (1979), a member of The Association of Ukrainian Writers (1997), a member of The Association of the Pop Art Professionals of Ukraine (1999), the head editor of the literary magazine Soborna Vulytsia ("Cathedral Street").

He was the father of Taras Kremin, formerly a Ukrainian politician in the Mykolaiv regional government and currently the People's Deputy of Ukraine in the Verkhovna Rada.

== Years of resistance ==
Artistic activism was subsequently curtailed during the Brezhnev era. When the government of the time took its search for those critical of the Soviet regime to Zakarpattia, Ivan Chendei was mocked and harassed for his book Bereznevyi Snih ("The March Snow") and his ingenious movie script for film director Serhii Parajanov's Tini Zabutyh Predkiv ("Shadows of Forgotten Ancestors"). Petro Skunts was criticized for his poem Rozpiattia ("Crucifixion"). The publication of new books by Mykola Matola was cancelled. All printed copies of Felix Kryvin’s novel Podrazhanie Teatru ("Imitation of Theatre") were destroyed.

According to Dmytro Kremin, the arrests of members of the intelligentsia was purposeful and targeted; however, radical youth remained undeterred. Kremin’s appreciation of student volnytsia ("freedom"), his trips to Lviv with Ivan Chendei, acquaintanceships with Gryhorii Chubai, Mykola Riabchuk, Oleh Lysheha, Viktor Morozov, Volodymyr Ivasiuk, and Roman Bezpalkiv—all this positioned Kremin for resistance against the political system. When Kremin and Mykola Matola started their own press, they used an old typewriter to type the issues of their literary journal Skrynia ("Chest") and, later, a series of chapbooks. It was in this period that copies of Skyrnia came into the hands of the punitive departments of the government. As a result, the government brought criminal charges against both Kremin and Matola, and government repression of Kremin began.

In early 1974, when Kremin’s first book was ready to be published, and among other texts the symphony-style pieces "Garden", “Paranoiac Zone ‘A’", “A Dance of the Travelling Fire", "Adam's Horses", and the poem "Memorandum of Gershtein" were included, a form of criticism popular at the time called "creative report" was organized for the student Kremin by the head of the Yurii Hoyda University Literary Studio and docent of the university at a special gathering of the Studio. The result was that the works by Dmytro Kremin were put under "microscopes" of criticism, and Kremin was accused of free-spirited thinking, being unclear, misunderstanding the use of imagery, and so on.

The police subsequently threatened Dmytro Kremin with expulsion from the university. Kremin was saved by Dmytro Chepur, the president of the university. Chepur admitted that Kremin's sources for his "incomprehensible writing" were in fact the poetic lyrics of the eminent Ukrainian poets Taras Shevchenko, Bohdan Ihor Antonych, and Pavlo Tychyna, poetic figures Kremin admired and considered his literary teachers.

== Books of poetry ==
- Travneva Arka ("May Arch") 1978
- Pivdenne Siayvo ("Southern Splendour") 1982
- Tanok Vohniu ("Dance of Fire") 1983
- Burshtynovyi Zhuravel ("An Amber Crane") 1987
- Shliah po Zoriah ("Pathway Beneath the Stars") 1990
- Skifske Zoloto: poezii ("Scythian Gold: poems") 1996
- Pektoral ("Pectoral") 1997
- Elehiya Troianskoho Vyna ("Elegy For Trojan Wine") 2001
- Litopys: Vybrane ("Chronicle: Selected Poems") 2003
- Atlantyda Pid Verboiu: Vybrani Poeziyi ("Atlantis Under the Willow Tree: Selected Poems") 2003
- Synopsys ("Synopsis") 2005
- Poliuvannia na Dykoho Vepra (The Hunt for the Wild Boar") 2006
- Litnii Chas ("Summertime") 2007
- Vybrani Tvory ("Selected Works") 2007
- Lampada nad Syniukhoiu ("A Candlelight Above Syniuha" in co-authorship with Andrii Antoniuk, the People's Artist of Ukraine) 2007
- Skifske Zoloto ("Scythian Gold") 2008
- Dva Bereha ("Two Shores") 2008
- Zamurovana Muzyka ("Walled-up Music") 2011
- Medovyi Misiats u Karfaheni ("Honeymoon in Carthage") 2013
- Lito Hospodnie (The Year of the Lord") 2016
- Skrypka z Toho Bereha ("A Violin on the Other Shore") 2016
- Sliozy Suhoho Fontanu ("Tears of the Dry Fountain") 2016

== Works of translation ==
Dmytro Kremin’s translations into Ukrainian:

- from Russian, the poetry of Borys Pasternak, Andrii Voznesenskii, Eugen Evtushenko, A. Chernov, L. Hryhorieva, Volodymyr Puchkov, Tamara Hordiyenko
- from Georgian, the poetry of Lasha Nadareishvili, M. Tsyklauri, Shota Nishnianidze, Nikoloz Baratishvili, M. Khetaguri
- from Ossetian, the poetry of S. Mindiashvili, V. Ikayev, N. Bakati
- from German, the poetry of Heinrich Heine, Johann Wolfgang Goethe
- from Polish, the poetry of Zbigniew Herbert, Yezhy Herasymovych, Tadeusz Różewicz, Leopold Staff, Julian Przyboś, Konstanty Ildefons Gałczyński
- from Slovak, the poetry of L'ubomir Feldek, Jan Kostra, Emil Boleslav Lukáč

Poems by Dmytro Kremin translated from Ukrainian:

- into Russian by Oleksandr Pavlov, Volodymyr Puchkov, Emil Yanvariov
- into English by Svitlana Ischenko, Russell Thornton, Svetlana Lavochkina
- into Latin by R. Chylachava, I. Auzin
- into Slovak by Valeria Yurychkova
- into Chinese by Zhang Zhizhun

Collections of translations of Dmytro Kremin's poetry:

- Olviyskii Transit ("An Olbian Transit", 2006) – translations into Russian by Oleksandr Pavlov
- Dva Berehy ("Two Shores", 2007) -- a trilingual book: translations into Russian by Volodymyr Puchkov, translations into English by Svitlana Ischenko and Russell Thornton—this book was awarded The Arsenii and Andrii Tarkovskii International Prize in 2010
- Osinni Yafyny ("Autumn Blueberries", issue 17, 2011) in the book series Mizh Karpatamy i Tatramy ("Between Carpathian and Tatry Mountains") translation into Slovak by Valeria Yurychkova
- Poems From the Scythian Wild Field (published in Canada by Ekstasis Editions, 2016) -- a selection of the poetry of Dmytro Kremin translated into English by Svetlana Ischenko and Russell Thornton:

== Poetry and journalism ==
Works by Kremin has been published in many prestigious literary magazines such as Vitchyzna ("Motherland"), Kyiv, Suchasnist ("Modern Times"), Kurier Kryvbasu ("Kryvbas Courier"), Dzvin ("Ringing"), Muzeinyi Provulok ("A Museum Back-lane"), Ukraine, Vezha ("Tower"), More ("The Sea"), Druzhba Narodiv ("Friendship of Nations"), Sobornist ("Joining of the Spirits"), London Magazine, Prism International, Hayden's Ferry Review, The Malahat Review, Eclectica, and in numerous newspapers, on internet websites and in e-magazines.

Some of Kremin's essays have received national attention: Tayemnytsia Sarkofaha ("The Mystery of a Sarcophagus"), Kozak Mamai u Suzirri Mankurta ("Cossack Mamai in the Constellation of Mankrut"), Kudy Orel Nese Delfina (Where an Eagle Carries a Dolphin"), Tryzubom po Dvohlavomu Gorobtsiu ("With a Trident for a Two-Headed Sparrow"), Planeta pid Verboiu ("A Planet Under a Willow Tree") and others, published between the 1980s and 1990s. His literary portraits of famous contemporary figures have gained special popularity: these include pieces on the visual artists Andrii Antoniuk, Volodymyr Bakhtov, Ivan Bulavytskyi, Anatolii Zavhorodnii, Mykhailo Ozernyi, and Mykhailo Riasnianskyi; the actor Vasyl Burdyk; the stage director Oleh Ihnatiev; the poets Petro Skunts, Ivan Chendei, and others.

Kremin’s essay Pischanyi Hodynnyk Ukrainy ("A Sand Clock of Ukraine") in collaboration with his son Taras Kremin has been published by the Solomon's Red Zirka Publishing House in 2011.

== Awards ==
- The Vasyl Chumak Ukrainian National Literary Prize (1987)
- The Mykola Arkas Cultural Prize (1994)
- The Taras Shevchenko National Literary Prize (1999)
- The Citizen of the Year in the Arts nomination (Mykolaiv, 1999)
- The Diploma of the Verkhovna Rada of Ukraine (2010)
- The Volodymyr Svidzinskyi Ukrainian National Literary Prize (2011)
- The Zoreslav Ukrainian National Literary Prize (2013)
- The Volodymyr Sosiura Ukrainian National Literary Prize (2013)
- The Leonid Vysheslavskyi Ukrainian National Literary Prize (2013)
- The Ivan Koshelivets International Literary Prize (2014)
- The Honored Worker of Arts of Ukraine (2016)

== Sources ==
- Музика поезії над рікою життя... : до 60-річчя від дня народження Дмитра Дмитровича Креміня: біобібліогр. покажч. / склад.: М. В. Тасинкевич; ред.: Т. С. Астапенко, Л. М. Голубенко; Миколаїв. обл. універс. наук. б-ка ім. О. Гмирьова. – Миколаїв, 2013. – 220 с. (укр.).
- Пророча правда поетової сльози // «Рідне Прибужжя», 10 жовтня 2014
- Кремінь Дмитро Дмитрович // Шевченківські лауреати 1962–2001. Енциклопедичний довідник. — Київ: Криниця, 2001. — 578 с. — С. 278–280.
- Агеев, Ю. «На золотій, на скифській пекторалі»/ Ю. Агеев // Южная правда. — 1999. — 27 апр. — С.1.
- Бойченко, В. Бенефіс на Голготі / В. Бойченко // Южная правда. — 2003. — 21 авг. — С.1,2.; Вересень. — 2003. — № 3. — С. 1–5.
- Гужва, В. Незнищенність поезії / В. Гужва // Укр. культура. −1998. — № 11–12. -С.12–13.
- Дмитро Кремінь: біограф. довідка // Література рідного краю: Письменники Миколаївщини: посібник-хрестоматія / Ред. Н. М. Огренич. — Миколаїв: Вид-во МОІПЛО, 2003. — С.188–191.
- Єжелов Г. "Співати мало: «Ще не вмерла» // Київ. — 1999. — № 11. — С.138–139.
- Золота В. «Величава мова» поезії Дмитра Кременя / В.Золота // українська мова та література. −2002. — № 40. — С.41–42.
- Качан А. Поетична іскра Дмитра Кременя / А.Качан // Літ. Україна. — 1999. — 13 трав. — С.1.
- Ковалів Ю. Літописна історіософія Дмитра Кременя / Ю. Коваль // Кремінь Д. Літопис: вибране / Д. Кремінь. — Миколаїв, 2003. — С.5–16.
- Кремінь Д.: [коротка біогр. довідка] // Хто є хто в українських мас-медіа. — К.: «К. І. С.», 1999. — С.351.
- Кремінь Д.: [коротка біогр. довідка] // Хто є хто в Україні. — К., 2000. — С.239.
- Кремінь Д.: [коротка біогр. довідка] // Письменники Радянської України.1917–1987: біобібліограф. словник. — К.,1988. — С.321–322.
- Кремінь, Д. Кремінь теж Сізіф: бесіда з поетом Д. Кременем / зап. О. Гаврош // Україна молода. — 2004. — 30 вересня. — С.13.
- Креминь Д. Д.: [биограф. справка] // Николаевцы.1789–1999: энцикл. словарь.-Николаев, 1999. — С.182.
- Логвиненко, О. На вагу духу вимірюється нова книжка поета Д. Кременя «Пектораль» /О.Логвиненко // Урядовий кур'єр. — 1999. — 15 черв. — С. 8.
- Маляров, А. Елегія троянського вина Дмитра Кременя /А. Маляров // Вітчизна. — 2001. — № 9–10. — С.146–147.
- Сизоненко, О. Дмитрові Кременю — на вручення Шевченківської премії /О. Сизоненко // Рад. Прибужжя. — 1999. — 3 квіт. — С.4.
- Старовойт, Л. В. «На розпутті великих доріг»: Образ України у збірці Дмитра Кременя «Полювання на дикого вепря» / Л. В. Старовойт // Письменники Миколаївщини: навч. посібник / Л. В. Старовойт. — Миколаїв, 2007. — С. 78–84.
- Шуляр, В. І цвістиме його сад упродовж століть! /В. Шуляр // Вересень. — 1999. — № 1. -С.35–38.
- Шуляр, В. Поетичне світовідчуття Дмитра Кременя / В.Шуляр // Дивослово. — 2000. — № 1. — С.47–50.
- Гладишев В. В. «Треба жити, щоб жила — вона…» / В. Гладишев // Методичні діалоги. — 2011. — № 9–10. — С. 37–43.
- Тасинкевич-Кирилюк М. Талант в трех измерениях : [ко дню рождения Дмитра Креминя] / М. Тасинкевич-Кирилюк // Южная правда. – 2014. – 21 авг. (№ 95). – С. 3.
- Kemp, Penn; Sitoski, Richard-Yves (2022). Poems in Response to Peril -- an Anthology in Support of Ukraine. London, Ontario, Canada: Pendas Productions/Laughing Raven Press, 2022. pp. 51–53. ISBN 978-1-927734-37-7.
- Kremin, Dmytro. "The Lost Manuscript". The Walrus (June 2022). Toronto, Ontario, Canada: 28.
- Magazine "The Walrus", June 2022, Toronto, Canada: Dmytro Kremin "The Lost Manuscript" translated by Svetlana Ischenko and Russell Thornton
