= Svetlana Ischenko =

Ukrainian poet

- Світлана Вікторівна Іщенко
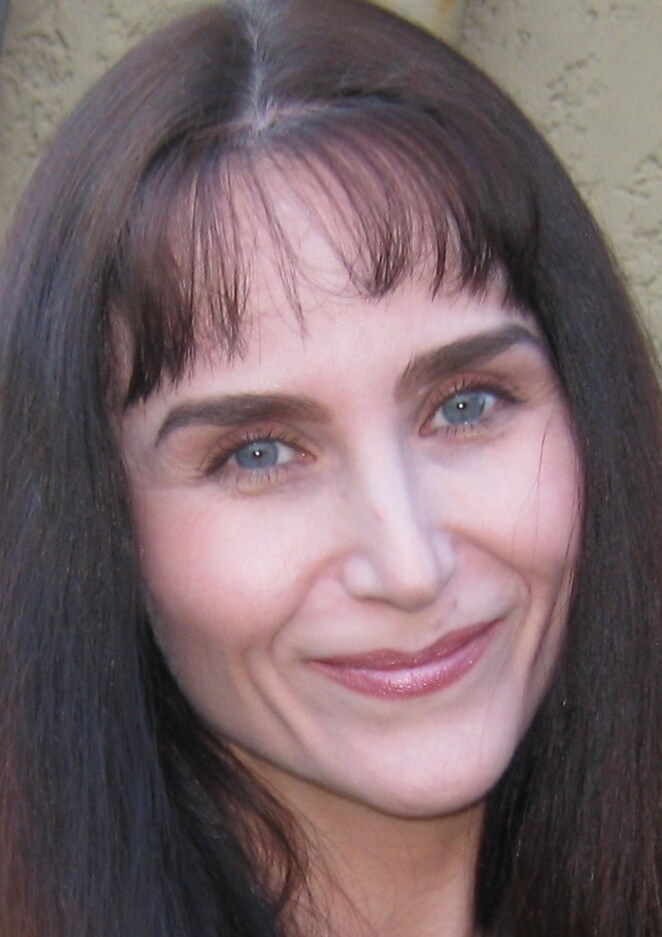
- Born: July 30, 1969; Mykolaiv, Ukraine
- Occupations: poet, translator, stage actress, teacher, artist
- Writing career
- Language: Ukrainian, English
- Genres: poetry, drama
- Notable awards: New names of Ukraine and The Golden Harp (Ukraine), Burnaby Writers’ Society Poetry Contest (Canada), The Ivan Koshelivets International Literary Prize (Israel), The Panteleimon Kulish International Literary-Artistic Prize (Ukraine)

Svetlana Viktorivna Ischenko (Ukrainian: Світлана Вікторівна Іщенко, born July 30, 1969, Mykolaiv, Ukraine) — poet, translator, stage actress, teacher, artist. She is a member of The Ukrainian Writers’ Association (1997) and The National Writers' Union of Ukraine (1998).

== Biography ==
Svetlana Ischenko was born on July 30, 1969, in Mykolaiv, in the steppe region of the south of Ukraine.

She graduated from Mykolaiv public school number 38. Svetlana pursued her childhood love of music at the Mykolaiv Rimsky-Korsakov Music School, and graduated in piano in 1986. She received a College Diploma in Acting, Stage Directing and Visual Art from the Mykolaiv State College of Culture in 1988. She later attended the Mykolaiv Branch of the Kyiv State University of Culture and Arts and received a BA in Recreation Management and Pedagogy in 1998.

For several years (1988–2001), Ischenko was a stage actress at the Mykolaiv Ukrainian Theatre of Drama and Musical Comedy. She played a number of significant characters from classic Ukrainian and European plays, among them Marusia (Marusia Churai by Lina Kostenko), Catherine (Catherine by Taras Shevchenko), Motrya (Kaydash's Family by Ivan Nechuy-Levytsky), Yaryna (Where There are people, There is Sin by І. Tobilevych), Ryna (Myna Mazaylo by Mykola Kulish), Prince (Dregs by Janusz Glovatsky), Julie (The Family Weekend by Jean Poiret), and Countess Rosine (Marriage of Figaro by P. Beaumarchais). Svetlana also created many poetic texts and songs for thematic programs, plays and musical shows for the Mykolaiv Ukrainian Theatre of Drama and Musical Comedy.

A number of Ukrainian composers and singers have created songs using Ischenko's poetry for lyrics—Viktor Ures, Viktor Piatygorsky, Oleksandr Nezhyhai, Olena Nikishenko, Oleksandr Honcharenko, Anna Oliynykova, and others.

In 2001, Ischenko immigrated to Canada. She lives in North Vancouver, British Columbia. Svetlana continues to keep in close contact with Ukraine. She writes in Ukrainian and English. Her literary achievement includes translations. Svetlana Ischenko is a co-translator of English versions of poetry by Dmytro Kremin, winner of the Taras Shevchenko Ukrainian National Literary Prize.

Ischenko's field of work in Canada is creating and teaching children's programs in visual arts, ballet, creative dance, jazz, hip-hop, and musical theatre at Recreational Centres in North Vancouver. She has given poetry readings at the Vancouver Public Library in the “World Poetry Reading Series” and radio interviews on Vancouver's Co-op Radio as well as Voice of America (“Musical Rainbow” by Alexandr Kaganovsky) in the U.S.

== Publications ==
Ischenko's poems were first published in the Mykolaiv regional newspaper The Soviet Prybuzhia on December 14, 1991. Svetlana's literary work has appeared widely in a variety of publications in Ukraine, including magazines such as Dzvin (Lviv), Kyiv (Kyiv), Gorozhanin (Mykolaiv), Dyvoslovo (Kyiv), Art-Line (Kyiv), Vitchyzna (Kyiv), Kurier Kryvbasu (Kryviy Rih), and Vezha (Kropyvnytskyi), almanacs such as Borviy (Mykolaiv), Buzsky Gard (Mykolaiv), and Osvityanski vitryla (Mykolaiv), and in poetry anthologies such as Pochatky (Kyiv, Smoloskyp Press, 1998) and The Mykolaiv Oberih (Mykolaiv, Mozhlyvosti Kimmerii Press, 2004). Svetlana's poems have also been published in Canadian literary magazines such as The Antigonish Review (Antigonish, Nova Scotia), Lichen (Whitby, Ontario), Event (Vancouver, British Columbia), and in poetic anthologies such as From This New World (Vancouver, Canada, 2003) and Che Wach Choe—Let the Delirium Begin (Lantzville, British Columbia, 2003).

Ischenko's co-translations of the poetry of Dmytro Kremin, winner of the Taras Shevchenko Ukrainian National Literary Prize, have appeared in well-known literary magazines such as London Magazine (London, England, 2007), Prism International (Vancouver, Canada, 2007), and Hayden’s Ferry Review (Arizona, US, 2009), in the trilingual collection Two Shores (Mykolaiv, Iryna Hudym Publisher, 2007) and in the book Poems From The Scythian Wild Field (Ekstasis Editions, Victoria, B.C., Canada, 2016) -- a selection of the poetry of Dmytro Kremin translated into English by Svetlana Ischenko and Russell Thornton

…Where a country lies under a willow tree,
Where the steppe spreads wide,
There is your motherland, lad,
The sun and the crepe of the sky.
Where the hellish history of the nation lies deep,
Where the snowball tree and hawthorn grow --
There is your spring water,
The Ukrainian world.

— Svetlana Ischenko, from the poem "Source"

== Books of poetry ==
- 1995 Chorals of the Earth and Sky (Ukrainian Writer—Vyr Press, Kyiv, Ukraine), including A Crane’s Cry, a dramatic play based on the novel by Roman Ivanychuk
- 1998 B-Sharp (Mozhlyvosti Kimmerii, Mykolaiv, Ukraine)
- 2005 In the Mornings I Find a Crane’s Feathers in My Damp Braids (Leaf Press, Lantzville, BC, Canada)
- 2019 The Trees Have Flown Up In Couples (Viktor Shvets Publishing House, Mykolaiv, Ukraine)
- 2024 Nucleus: A Poet's Lyrical Journey From Ukraine To Canada (Ronsdale Press, Vancouver, BC, Canada)

== Works of translation ==
From Ukrainian into English

- Dmytro Kremin The Horse Constellation (magazine The Malahat Review, issue 188, Victoria, B.C., Canada, 2014), The Lost Manuscript (magazine The London Magazine, issue June–July 2007, London, England), Don Quixote From the Estuary (magazine Prism International, issue 45:4, Summer 2007, Vancouver, Canada), The Tower of Pisa, The Tendra Mustungs' Odyssey, Wild Honey, A Church in the Middle of the Universe, Christmas in Bohopil, The Hunt For the Wild Boar (magazine Hayden's Ferry Review, issue 44, spring-summer 2009, Virginia, Arizona, US).
- Poems From The Scythian Wild Field (Ekstasis Editions, Victoria, B.C., Canada, 2016) -- a selection of the poetry of Dmytro Kremin translated into English by Svetlana Ischenko and Russell Thornton
- Dmytro Kremin The Lost Manuscript (magazine The Walrus, issue June 2022, Toronto, Canada)
- Гліб Бабіч/ Hlib Babich Камуфляжна Мадонна/ A Camouflaged Madonna -- bilingual book of selected poetry translated by Svetlana Ischenko (Mykolaiv, Ukraine, Іліон Press, 2026)

From Russian into Ukrainian

- Sergei Yesenin Persian Motives in the book B-Sharp (Mykolaiv, "Можливості Кіммерії", 1998)
- Alexandr Pushkin To the Fountain of the Bakhchisaray Palace in the book The Trees Have Flown Up In Couples (Mykolaiv, «Видавництво Віктора Швеця», 2019)
- Larisa Маtveyevа (selected poems) in the book The Trees Have Flown Up In Couples (Mykolaiv, «Видавництво Віктора Швеця», 2019)

From English into Ukrainian

- Seven Canadian poets in translation in Variations on the Word Love: Anthology of Canadian Poets (magazine Kyiv, issue 7-8, 2017, Ukraine)
- Canadian Poetry translated by Svetlana Ischenko (magazine "Soborna Vulytsia" (Cathedral Street), Mykolaiv, December 2017)

== Awards ==
- in Ukraine: The New Names of Ukraine and The Golden Harp, 1995
- in Canada: Burnaby Writers’ Society Poetry Contest, 2003
- in Israel: The Ivan Koshelivets International Literary Prize, 2013
- in Ukraine: The Best Mykolaiv Book of the Year 2019 in Poetry nomination: Svetlana Ischenko The Trees Have Flown Up In Couples, 2019
- in Ukraine: The Panteleimon Kulish International Literary-Artistic Prize for Nucleus: A Poet's Lyrical Journey From Ukraine To Canada, 2025

== Visual Art displayed ==
- Mykolaiv Central Library of Marko Kropyvnytsky, Mykolaiv, Ukraine, 2000 and 2017
- Art portal online Ukrainian Woman
- Fundraiser / Exhibition "My Connections: Ukraine - Canada", The Polygon Gallery, North Vancouver, BC, Canada, August 22 2023
- Lions Gate Community Centre, North Vancouver, BC, Canada, August 2023 - February 2024

== Sources and external links ==
- Entry in Encyclopedia of Modern Ukraine
- Poetry in internet-magazine The Literary Mykolaiv
- Songs using Svetlana Ischenko’s poetry for lyrics available in internet-magazine The Literary Mykolaiv
- Poetry, songs, biography on web-portal Zhinka-Ukrainka
- Photo Gallery on web-portal Zhinka-Ukrainka
- Paintings by Svetlana Ischenko
- Poems From The Scythian Wild Field (a selection of the poetry of Dmytro Kremin translated from Ukrainian by Svetlana Ischenko and Russell Thornton)
- Poetry in Vitchyzna magazine issue 1-2, 2007
- Poetry on Bukvoyid website
- Three sonnets from a crown of sonnets “A Woman” on Bukvoid website
- Poetry After the Song of Solomon on Dotyk Slovom website
- Dmytro Kremin re: Svetlana Ischenko (video) on internet magazine The Literary Mykolaiv issue 4 – 2012
- Personal thanks to a Poet -- Dmytro Kremin, an article on the 60th birthday of the poet D. Kremin
- Entry in Mykolaiv Regional Viktor Liagin Library for children website
- Poem on Leaf Press, Canada website
- Information on chapbook on Leaf Press, Canada website
- Interview with S. Ischenko by Inna Bereza, “A Dialogue with a Compatriot” in Prosvita Khersonschyny—Visnyk Tavriyskoyi Fundatsiyi, issue 4, 2007
- Mykolaiv Scientific-Pedagogic Library: Svetlana Ischenko -- Biography
- Entry in Mykolaiv Central Marko Kropyvnytskyi Library website
- Interview with Svetlana Ischenko, TV channel "Mykolaiv", Ukraine, June 23, 2017
- "Poems From the Scythian Wild Field" -- poetry readings at the Marko Kropyvnytskyi Library, TV channel "Mykolaiv, Ukraine June 23, 2017
- Video and photos from the poetry readings by Dmytro Kremin and Svetlana Ischenko at the Marko Kropyvnytskyi Library, Mykolaiv, Ukraine, June 23, 2017
- Paintings by Svetlana Ischenko gifted by the author to the Marko Kropyvnytskyi Library, Mykolaiv, Ukraine
- V.S.Horbatiuk, P.S.Malish, V.C.Mihaylevsky, A.E.Romasiukov. Південний Буг: літературний альманах [Southern Buh: Literary Almanac] (in Ukrainian). Khmelnytsky: 2019. p. 256. ISBN 978-617-513-593-8.
- V.Shuliar, K.Kartuzov. #ЄТекстМиколаївщини: літературно-художня антологія [#Є Text of Mykolaiv: Literary Anthology] (in Ukrainian). Mykolaiv: "Іліон", 2020. p. 216. ISBN 978-617-534-594-8.
- Ischenko, Svetlana. "Svetlana Ischenko: Portraits in Free-Verse and Sonnets". Kyiv (in Ukrainian) (1–2, 2022). Kyiv, Ukraine: 111-118.
- Kemp, Penn; Sitoski, Richard-Yves (2022). Poems in Response to Peril -- an Anthology in Support of Ukraine. London, Ontario, Canada: Pendas Productions/Laughing Raven Press, 2022. p. 51-53. ISBN 978-1-927734-37-7.
- Kremin, Dmytro. "The Lost Manuscript". The Walrus (June 2022). Toronto, Ontario, Canada: 28.
- Canadian Literary Magazine "The Walrus", June 2022: Dmytro Kremin "The Lost Manuscript" translated by Svetlana Ischenko and Russell Thornton
- "Dmytro Kremin: A Portrait" poem by Svetlana Ischenko (video)
- An interview "North Vancouver fundraiser supports Ukrainians affected by Russian invasion" about an arts and poetry fundraiser "My Connections: Ukraine - Canada" organized by Svetlana Ischenko at the Polygon Gallery in North Vancouver, The Early Edition CBC Radio, Vancouver, August 22 2023
- "Nucleus: A Poet's Lyrical Journey From Ukraine to Canada" by Svetlana Ischenko, Ronsdale Press, Vancouver, BC
- BC BookWorld interview, winter 2023-2024
- "Nucleus" - Book Trailer
- CBC Books, spring 2024
- All Lit Up: An interview with poet Svetlana Ischenko, April 23 2024
- The Literary Ukraine:"Світлана Іщенко: Мені хотілося розповісти про Україну, її історію і культуру через свій особистий досвід і погляд"(interview in Ukrainian), Jan.12 2025
- The British Columbia Review: Resilience, transformation, memory (Jan.23 2025)
