= List of translators from Ukrainian =

The following is a list of translators from Ukrainian of works of Ukrainian literature and humanities into other languages. They are listed by the language into which they translated these works.

== Albanian ==
Name	Life	Translated Authors	Reference
Eaton Kelmendi (uk)	1978–	Sergey Dzyuba	

== Armenian ==
Name	Life	Translated Authors	Reference
Mesropyan Anushavan		Olena Galeta	

== Azerbaijani ==
Name	Life	Translated Authors	Reference
Abdullah Abbas (uk)	1940–	Ivan Drach, Taras Shevchenko	
Hasanadze Rauf		Stepan Protsyuk	
Iskanderzade Elgin		Stepan Protsyuk	
Kim Medina		Ivan Andrusyak (uk)	

== Belarusian ==
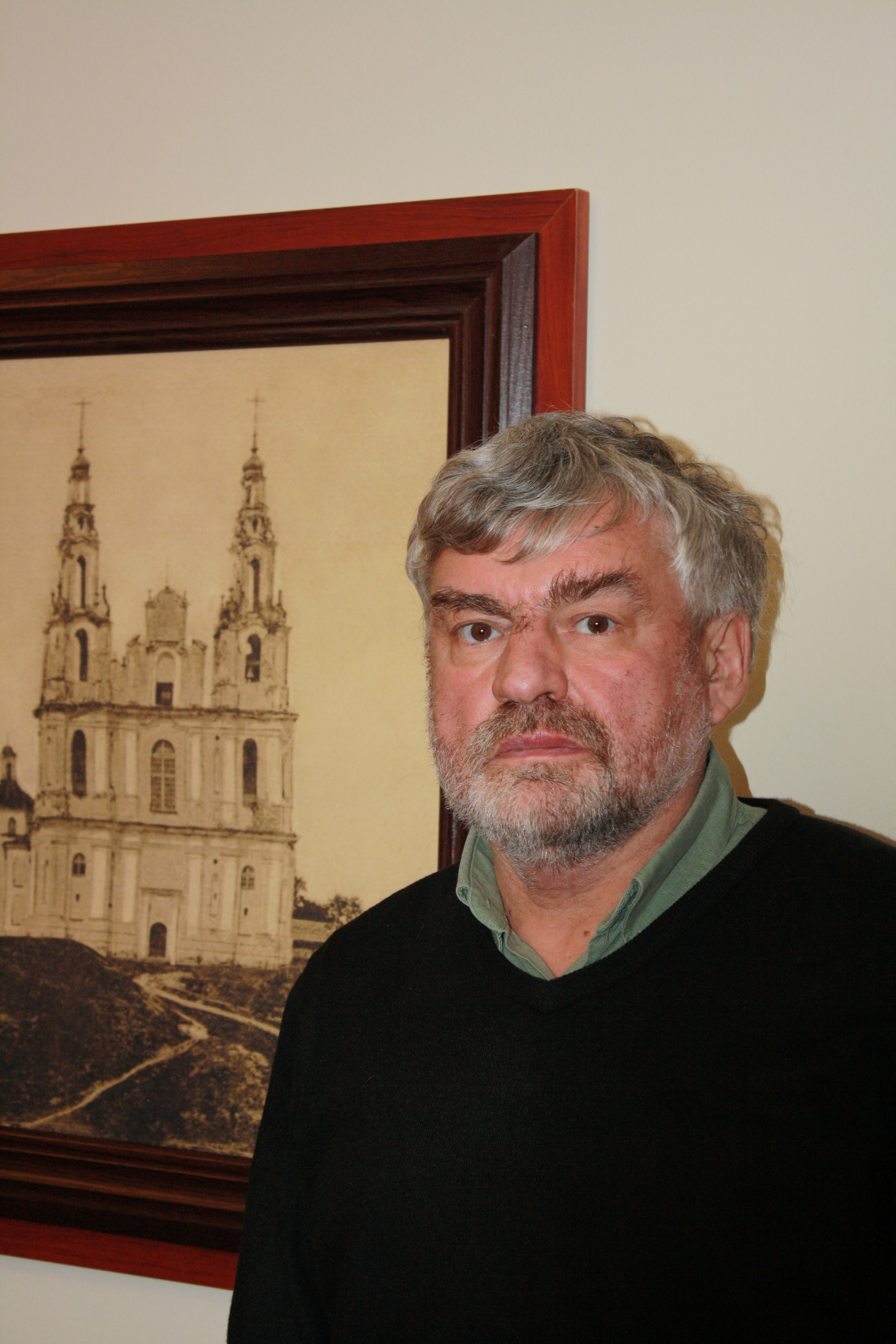
Vladimir Orlov

Name	Life	Translated Authors	Reference
Vladimir Orlov (uk)	1953–	Alexander Irvanets	
Maria Martysevich (uk)	1982–	Galina Kruk	
Mikhas Skobla (be)	1966–	Ivan Andrusyak (uk)	
Andrey Khadanovich (uk)	1973–	Yurii Andrukhovych	
Shoda Marina		Yurii Andrukhovych	

== Bengali ==
Name	Life	Translated Authors	Reference
Mridula Ghosh (uk)		Gregory Skovoroda, Taras Shevchenko, Pavlo Chubynsky, Ivan Franko, Lesya Ukrainka, Mykola Voronyi, Oleksandr Oles	

== Bulgarian ==
Name	Life	Translated Authors	Reference
Kamberova Raina		Yuriy Vynnychuk	
Totomanov Ivan		Yurii Andrukhovych	

== Catalan ==
Name	Life	Translated Authors	Reference
Girona Catalina		Antonovsky Valerievich	

== Danish ==
Name	Life	Translated Authors	Reference
Toger Thorsten		Galina Kruk	

== Dutch ==
Name	Life	Translated Authors	Reference
Selman Helen		Oksana Zabuzhko	

== English ==
Name	Life	Translated Authors	Reference
Constantine-Henry Andrusyshen(uk)	1907–1983	Ivan Franko, Vasyl Stefanyk, Mykhailo Kotsyubynsky, Mykola Khvylovy, Marko Cheremshina, The Ukrainian Poets (1189-1962) anthology	
Mark Andryczyk(uk)	1970–	Yuri Andrukhovych, Volodymyr Rafeyenko, Taras Prokhasko,The White Chalk of Days, Writing from Ukraine, and Ukraine 22 anthologies	
Svitlana Bednazh		Larysa Denysenko Dmytro Pavlychko, Taras Shevchenko	
Anatole Bilenko		Oleksandr Dovzhenko, Oles Honchar	
Uilleam Blacker		Taras Prokhasko, Oleh Sentsov, Maik Yohansen	
Martha Bohachevsky-Chomiak		Ivan Drach, Vitaly Korotich, Lina Kostenko, Vasyl Symonenko	
Theodosia Boresky		Ivan Franko	
Bohdan Boychuk(uk)	1927-2017	Volodymyr Svidzinsky(uk)	
James Brasfield	1952–	Oleh Lysheha	
Marco Carynnyk(uk)	1944–	Osadchy Grigorovich, Leonid Ivanovich, Ihor Kalynets, Mykhailo Kotsiubynsky, Oksana Zabuzhko	
Vitaly Chernetsky(uk)		Yuri Andrukhovych, Sofia Andrukhovych, Alevtina Kakhidze(uk), Ostap Slyvynsky, Letters from Ukraine anthology	
Patrick John Corness		Lesia Ukrainka	
Reilly Costigan-Humes		Andriy Lyubka, Markiyan Kamysh, Serhiy Zhadan	
Percival Cundy(uk)	1871–1947	Ivan Franko, Lesya Ukrainka	
Gladys Evans		Dmytro Pavlychko, Maksym Rylsky, Lesya Ukrainka	
Katie Farris	1983–	Lesyk Panasiuk(uk)	
Fedynsky Peter		Taras Shevchenko	
Olia Ferbey Prokopiw		Olena Teliha	
Amelia Glaser		Halyna Kruk, Iya Kiva	
Andrew Gregorovich		Taras Shevchenko	
John Hennessy		Yuri Andrukhovych, Serhiy Zhadan, New York Elegies anthology	
Ed Hogan		From Three Worlds anthology	
Dominique Hoffman		Yaroslav Hrytsak, Oleksii Nikitin(uk), Olena Stiazhkina(uk)	
Marta Horban		Oksana Zabuzhko	
Halyna Hryn		Oksana Zabuzhko	
David Ignatow	1914–1997	Bohdan Boychuk(uk)	
Yuliya Ilchuk		Halyna Kruk, Iya Kiva	
Roman Ivashkiv		Yuriy Izdryk	
Olena Jennings		Artem Chekh, Kateryna Kalytko, Vasyl Makhno, Yuliya Musakovska, Iryna Shuvalova	
Ilya Kaminsky	1977–	Lesyk Panasiuk(uk), In the Hour of War anthology	
Victoria Kholmogorova		Valeriy Shevchuk	
Oles Kovalenko(uk)	1945–2012	Ivan Nechuy-Levytsky	
Stanley Kunitz	1905–2006	Ivan Drach	
Ali Kinsella		Natalka Bilotserkivets, Halyna Kruk, Taras Prokhasko, Stanislav Kulchytsky, Love in Defiance of Pain anthology	
Ostap Kin		Yuri Andrukhovych, Serhiy Zhadan, Babyn Yar and New York Elegies anthologies	
Watson Kirkconnell		Taras Shevchenko, The Ukrainian Poets (1189-1962) anthology	
Svetlana Lavochkina	1973–	Dmytro Kremin, Lyuba Yakimchuk	
Hanna Leliv		Kateryna Babkina, Ivan Baidak(uk), Markiyan Kamysh, Ihor Mysiak, Oleksandr Mykhed(uk), Olesya Yaremchuk(uk)	
Orysia Love		Olena Teliha	
George S. N. Luckyj	1919–2001	Ivan Drach, Vitaly Korotich, Lina Kostenko, Mykola Khvylovy, Mykhailo Kotsiubynsky, Panteleimon Kulish, Valerian Pidmohylny, Taras Shevchenko, Vasyl Symonenko, Before the Storm anthology	
Moira Luckyj		Panteleimon Kulish, Valerian Pidmohylny	
Gavur Luba (uk)	1957–	Ivan Andrusyak, Oles Ulyanenko	
Oksana Lutsyshyna (uk)	1974–	Artem Chekh, Kateryna Kalytko	
Grace Mahoney		Iryna Starovoyt, Ostap Slyvynsky	
Oksana Maksymchuk	1982–	Alex Averbuch, Marianna Kiyanovska, Lyuba Yakimchuk, Words for War anthology	
Taras Malkovych		Ostap Slyvynsky	
Clarence A. Manning	1893–1972	Ivan Franko, Taras Shevchenko	
Askold Melnyczuk	1954–	Yuriy Vynnychuk, Oksana Zabuzhko, From Three Worlds anthology	
Bohdan Melnyk		Ivan Franko, Ivan Kotliarevsky	
Robert Hay Morrison	1915–2004	Australia's Ukrainian Poets anthology	
Nina Murray		Stanislav Aseyev, Oksana Lutsyshyna, Lesia Ukrainka, Iryna Vikyrchak(uk), Serhiy Zhadan, Oksana Zabuzhko	
Yuliya Musakovska	1982–	Artur Dron	
Patricia Nell Warren	1936–2019	Mykhailo Kotsyubynsky, Vasyl Stefanyk, Ukrainian Dumy	
Florence Randal Livesay (uk)	1874–1953	Taras Shevchenko, Yuriy Fedkovych, Stepan Rudansky, Sidir Vorobkevych, Hryhoriy Kvitka-Osnovyanenko, Songs of Ukraina anthology, Ukrainian Folk Tales	
George Mihaychuk		Volodymyr Vynnychenko	
Michael Naydan(uk)	1952–	Yurii Andrukhovych, Bohdan Ihor Antonych, Natalka Bilotserkivets, Larysa Denysenko, Yuri Vynnychuk(uk), Oles Ilchenko(uk), Lina Kostenko, Hryhoriy Kvitka-Osnovyanenko, Dmytro Pavlychko, Bohdan Rubchak(uk), Irene Rozdobudko(uk), Maksym Rylsky, Hryhory Skovoroda, Pavlo Tychyna, A Hundred Years of Youth and Herstories anthologies	
Paul Nemser		Ivan Drach, Bohdan Ihor Antonych	
Dzvinia Orlowsky		Natalka Bilotserkivets, Halyna Kruk, Dmytro Pavlychko	
Marko Pavlyshyn(uk)	1955–	Yurii Andrukhovych, Yuriy Izdryk	
Wanda Phipps		Oleh Lysheha, Serhiy Zhadan, In a Different Light anthology	
Orest Popovych(uk)	1933–	Vasil Makhno	
Maria G. Rewakowicz		Mykola Vorobyov	
Vera Rich	1936–2009	Ivan Franko	
Max Rosochinsky	1986–	Alex Averbuch, Marianna Kiyanovska, Lyuba Yakimchuk, Words for War anthology	
Mark Rudman	1948–	Bohdan Ihor Antonych, Bohdan Boychuk(uk), Ivan Drach	
Bohdan Rubchak(uk)	1935-2018	Volodymyr Svidzinsky(uk)	
Olha Rudakevych		Emma Andijewska	
Myroslav Shkandrij(uk)	1950–	Mykola Khvylovy, Serhiy Zhadan	
Iryna Shuvalova		Ostap Slyvynsky	
Mary Skrypnyk	1915–2012	Dniprova Chayka, Olha Kobylianska, Petro Kravchuk, Dmytro Pavlychko, Taras Shevchenko, Vasyl Stefanyk, Ivan Franko, Ukrainian Folk Tales	
Danylo S. Struk(uk)		Ivan Drach, Vitaly Korotich, Lina Kostenko, Vasyl Symonenko	
Eleonora Solovey		Volodymyr Svidzinsky(uk)	
Isaac Stackhouse Wheeler		Andriy Lyubka, Serhiy Zhadan, Ivan Baidak(uk)	
Myroslava Stefaniuk		Vasyl Holoborodko	
Yuriy Tarnawsky	1934–	Ukrainian Dumy	
Virlana Tkacz	1952–	Oleh Lysheha, Serhiy Zhadan, In a Different Light anthology	
Yuri Tkacz (Tkach)	1954–	Borys Antonenko-Davydovych, Oles Berdnyk, Ivan Franko, Oles Honchar, Andriy Kokotiukha(uk), Maria Matios, Vasyl Shevchuk(uk), Before the Storm and On the Fence anthologies	
Zenia Tompkins		Stanislav Aseyev, Artem Chapeye, Tanja Maljartschuk, Olesya Yaremchuk(uk), Love in Defiance of Pain anthology	
John Weir		Ivan Franko, Taras Shevchenko	
Lidia Wolanskyj		Stanislav Aseyev, Oksana Kis(uk), Yuri Kostenko	
Svitlana Yakovenko		Oleksa Storozhenko, Maik Yohansen, Geo Shkurupiy, Hryhorii Skovoroda	
Larissa M. L. Zaleska Onyshkevych		An Anthology of Modern Ukrainian Drama	

== German ==
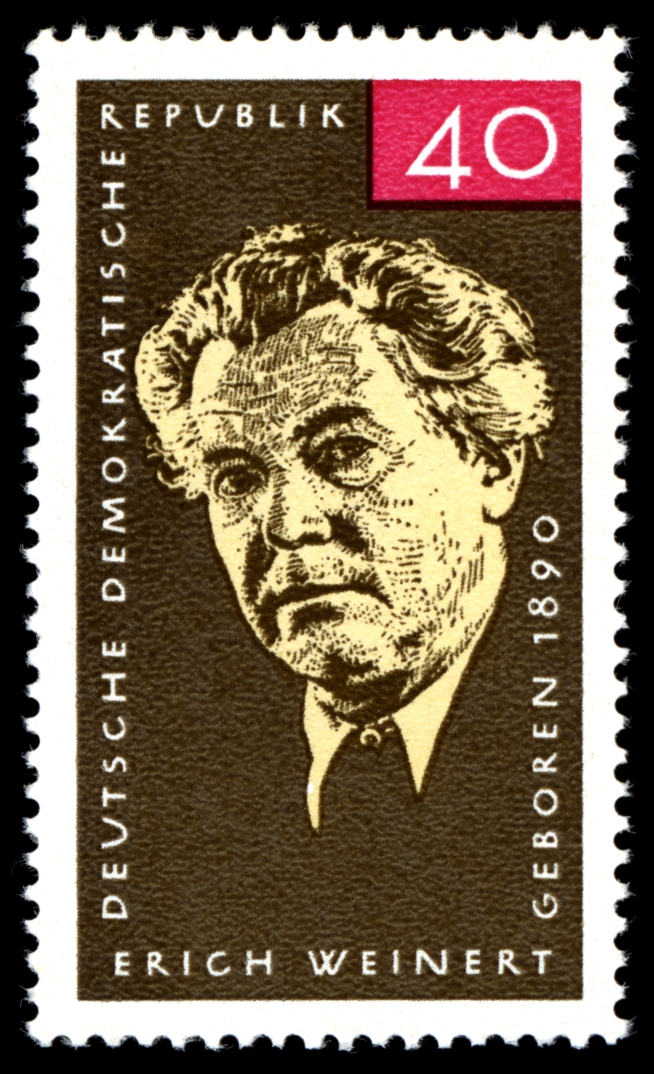
Erich Weinert on a 1965 East German postage stamp

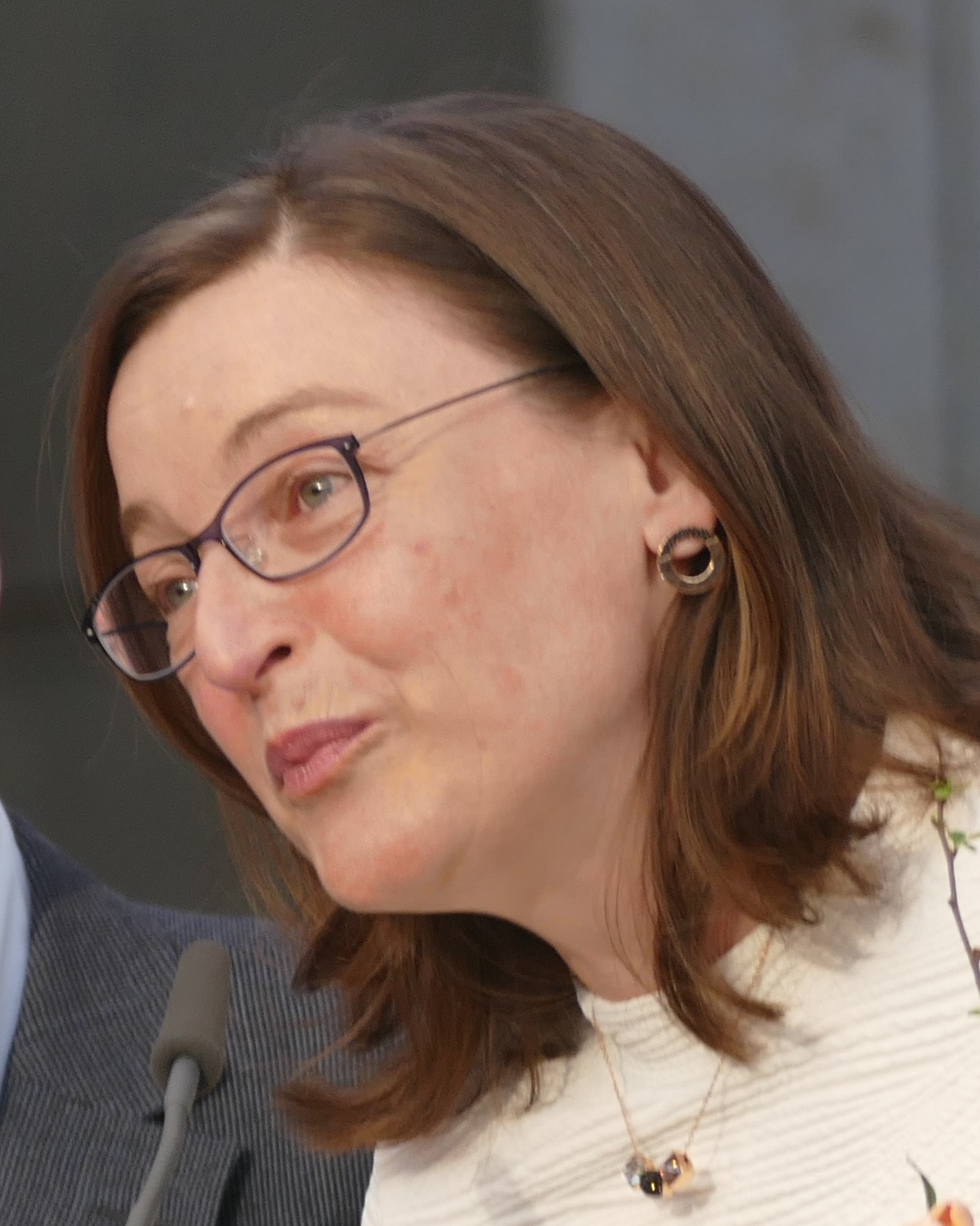
Sabine Stöhr at the 2018 Leipzig book fair

Name	Life	Translated Authors	Reference
Klara Blum	1904–1971	Taras Shevchenko	
Kati Brunner	1977–		
Christian Weise	1960–	Vasyl Makhno, Olesya Yaremchuk, Mykola Davydyuk, Kyrylo Tkachenko, Vakhtang Kipiani,	
Erich Weinert	1890–1953	Taras Shevchenko, Ivan Franko	
Maria Weissenböck	1980–	Lubko Deresh, Sophia Andruchovych	
Gunhild Wesselmann		Alexander Irvanets	
Alois Woldan	1954–	Halyna Kruk, Yuriy Andrukhovych	
Anna-Galya Gorbach	1924–2011	M. Kotsyubynsky, G. Khotkevych . V. Stus, E. Sverstyuk, V. Marchenko, I. Kalinets, V. Shevchuk, Yu. Andrukhovych, Stepan Protsyuk, Viktor Kordun, Oles Ulyanenko	
Claudia Dathe	1971–	Serhiy Zhadan, Halyna Kruk, Maria Matios, Oksana Zabuzhko	
Michael Donhauser	1956–	Yuriy Andrukhovych, Andriy Bondar, Serhiy Zhadan, Natalka Bila Tserkva, Oleh Lysheha, Emma Andievska	
Juri Durkot	1965–	Yuriy Andrukhovych, Serhiy Zhadan	
Adolf Endler	1930–2009	Mykola Bazhan	
Joachim Sartorius		Yuriy Andrukhovych, Andriy Bondar, Serhiy Zhadan, Natalka Bila Tserkva, Oleh Lysheha, Emma Andievska	
Kachanyuk-Spekh Iryna		Lesya Ukrainka, Taras Shevchenko, Ivan Franko, Volodymyr Mykhailo Yaniv, Yendyk Rostyslav, Dmytro Pavlychko, Ivan Kalinets, Lina Kostenko and others.	
Karin Keller		Sergey Grabar	
Kostecki Igor	1913–1983	Oles Gonchar	
Elisabeth Cottmeier	1902–1983	Oles Gonchar	
Alexander Kratochvil		Oksana Zabuzhko, Yuriy Vynnychuk, Sophia Andruchovych	
Nagel Lydia	1977–	Natalka Snyadanko	
Sofia Onufriv	1970–	Yuriy Andrukhovych	
Lisa Palmes	1975–	Serhiy Zhadan, Yevhen Polozhiy, Natalka Snyadanko, Sashko Ushkalov	
Oskar Pastior	1927–2006	Andriy Bondar, Serhiy Zhadan, Natalka Bila Tserkva, Oleh Lysheha, Emma Andievska	
Stefanya Ptashnyk		Yuriy Andrukhovych	
Hans Thill	1954–	Yuriy Andrukhovych, Andriy Bondar, Serhiy Zhadan, Natalka Bila Tserkva, Oleh Lysheha, Emma Andievska	
Ubersprecher Bettina		Galina Kruk	
Anja Utler	1973–	Yuriy Andrukhovych, Andriy Bondar, Serhiy Zhadan, Natalka Bila Tserkva, Oleh Lysheha, Emma Andievska	
Harald Fleischmann		Timothy Gavrilov	
Sabine Stöhr	1968–	Yuriy Andrukhovych, Lyubko Deresh, Serhiy Zhadan	

== Latvian ==
Name	Life	Translated Authors	Reference
Vizma Belševica		Mykola Vinhranovsky, Ivan Drach	

== Lithuanian ==
Name	Life	Translated Authors	Reference
Dekshnis Vitas		Halyna Kruk, Serhiy Zhadan	
Ioninas Antanas		Natalka Tserkva, Lyudmila Taran	

== Polish ==
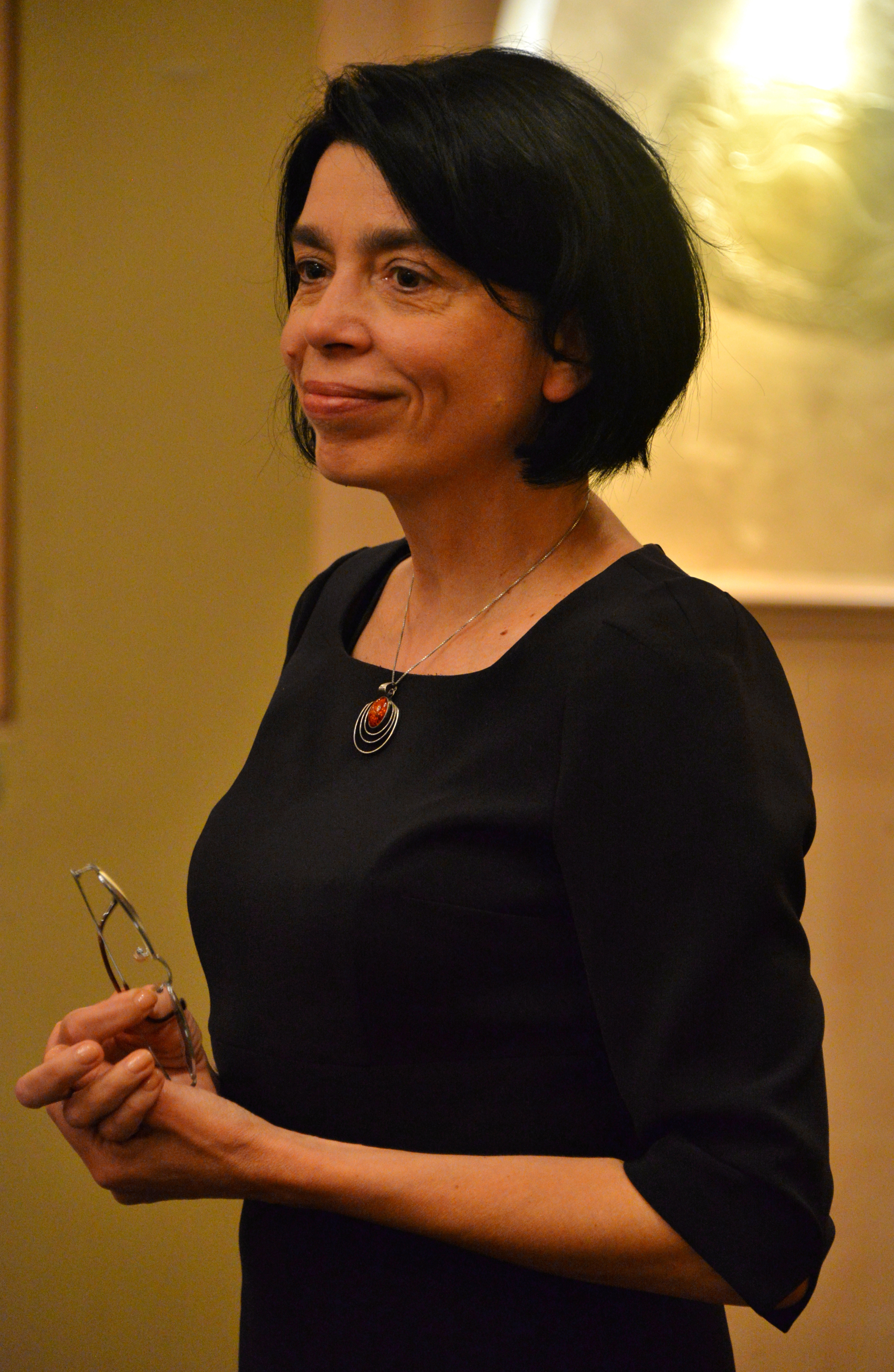
Alexandra Hnatyuk presenting a report in Toronto in 2016

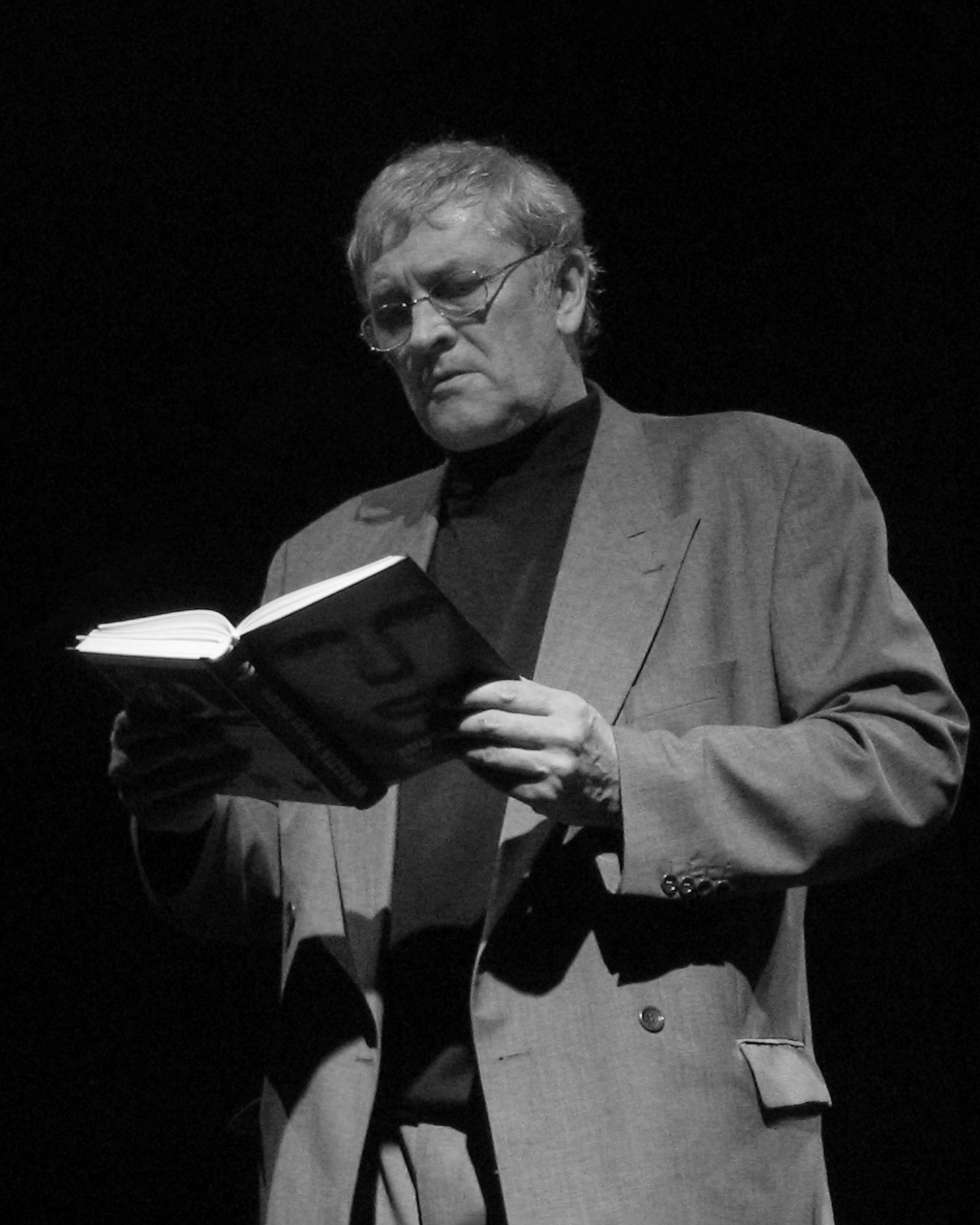
Polish poet, writer, and translator Bohdan Zadura

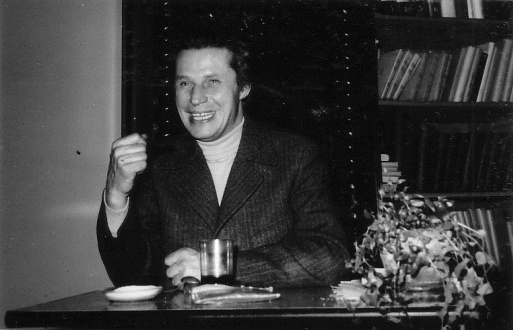
Tadeusz Śliwiak

Name	Life	Translated Authors	Reference
Vitvitskaya-Rutkovskaya Ursula		Galina Kruk	
Marcin Gaczkowski		Layuk Myroslav Mykolayovych, Yatsenko Petro Oleksandrovych, Stus Vasyl Semenovych, Malyarchuk Tetyana Volodymyrivna, Zavadsky Yuriy Romanovych	
Aleksandra Hnatiuk	1961–	Yuriy Andrukhovych, Natalia Yakovenko, Mykola Ryabchuk	
Bohdan Zadura	1945–	Dmytro Pavlychko, Yuriy Andrukhovych, Andriy Bondar, Vasyl Makhno, Serhiy Zhadan, Ostap Slyvynsky, Natalka Bilotserkivets, Emma Andievska, Halyna Kruk, Andriy Lyubka	
Aneta Kamińska	1976–	Oksana Zabuzhko, Viktor Neborak, Yuriy Izdryk, Maria Shun, Nazar Honchar, Roman Sadlovsky, Ivan Luchuk, Ivan Andrusyak, Marianna Kiyanovska, Mariana Savka, Oksana Lutsyshyna, Dmytro Lazutkin, Katrina Haddad, Olena Husetsayav, Oleg Lyubov Yakymchuk, Bohdan-Oleg Gorobchuk, Andriy Lyubka	
Tadeusz Karabowicz	1959–	Emma Andievska, Sofia Maidanska	
Kotyńska Katarzyna	1973–	Yuriy Andrukhovych, Oleksandr Irvanets	
Lazarus Anna		Galina Kruk	
Ewa Mazur		Sofia Maidanska	
Mihał Petryk		Halyna Kruk, Yuriy Andrukhovych, Serhiy Zhadan	
Renata Rusnak		Natalka Snyadanko, Taras Prokhasko, Yuriy Andrukhovych, Serhiy Zhadan	
Slavinska Anna		Galina Kruk	
Tadeusz Śliwiak	1928–1994		
Lidia Stefanowska	1960–	Yuriy Izdryk, Yuriy Andrukhovych	
Przemyslaw Tomanek	1967–	Yuriy Andrukhovych	
Czech Jerzy		Neda Nezhdana, Oleksandr Irvanets	
Magdalena Sharetskaya		Yuriy Vynnychuk, Halyna Kruk	

== Portuguese ==
Name	Life	Translated Authors	Reference
Vira Vovk	1926–	V. Holoborodko, Serhiy Dziuba, Oksana Lutsyshyna, Dmytro Lazutkin	

== Tatar ==
Name	Life	Translated Authors	Reference
Yunus Kandymov		Taras Shevchenko, Lesya Ukrainka, Mykhailo Kotsyubynsky, Mykola Voronyi, Pavlo Tychyna, Volodymyr Sosyura	
