= List of Ukrainian women writers =

This is a list of women writers who were born in Ukraine or whose writings are closely associated with that country.

== A ==
- Anastasia Afanasieva (born 1982), physician, poet, writer, translator
- Svetlana Alexievich (born 1948), Ukrainian-born Belarusian novelist, journalist, works translated into English
- Victoria Amelina (1986–2023), Ukrainian novelist and poet; winner of the Joseph Conrad Literary Award
- Emma Andijewska (born 1931), poet, short story writer, novelist, some works translated into English
- Nadija Hordijenko Andrianova (1921–1998), translator, journalist, writings in Esperanto
- Sofia Andrukhovych (born 1982), novelist, translator
- Hanna Arsenych-Baran (1970–2021), novelist, poet and prose writer
- Rose Ausländer (1901–1988), Ukrainian-born German-language poet

== B ==
- Kateryna Babkina (born 1985), poet, writer and playwright.
- Anna Bahriana (born 1981), novelist, poet, playwright, translator
- Oleksandra Bandura (1917–2010), teacher, literature scholar, writer
- Hanna Barvinok, pen name of Oleksandra Kulish-Bilozerska (1828–1911), writer and folklorist.
- Marie Bashkirtseff (1858–1884), diarist, painter, sculptor
- Natalia Belchenko (born 1973), poet, translator
- Nina Bichuya (born 1937), novelist, children's writer
- Svitlana Biedarieva (fl 2014), art historian, editor
- Nella Bielski (1930s–2020), Ukrainian-born French novelist, actress
- Natalka Bilotserkivets (born 1954), poet, translator
- Inna Bulkina (1963–2021), literary critic and editor

== C ==
- Dniprova Chayka, pen name of Liudmyla Vasylevska (1861–1927), poet, short story writer, translator, wrote in Russian and Ukrainian, some works translated into English
- Olena Chekan (1946–2013), film, stage and television actress, voice artist, television screenwriter and editor, political journalist and social activist, columnist, short story writer, essayist, humanist and feminist
- Tetiana Cherep-Perohanych (born 1974), poet, novelist, playwright and journalist
- Daria Chubata (born 1940), Ukrainian physician, writer, poet
- Eugenia Chuprina (born 1971) Ukrainian poet, novelist, writer, playwright

== D ==
- Anastasia Dmitruk (born 1991), poet, writing in Russian and Ukrainian
- Raya Dunayevskaya (1910–1987), Ukrainian-born Russian-American, historical writings on Marxism and feminism, author of Marxism and Freedom: From 1776 Until Today
- Ariel Durant (1898–1981), Ukrainian-born Russian-American non-fiction writer, co-author of The Story of Civilization with her husband Will Durant
- Bohdana Durda (born 1940), writer, poet, songwriter
- Maryna Dyachenko (born 1968), novelist, short story writer together with her husband Serkiy Dyachenko

== G ==
- Zuzanna Ginczanka, pen name of Zuzanna Polina Gincburg (1917–1945), Ukrainian-born Polish-Jewish poet
- Lydia Grigorieva (born 1945), poet, photographer, now living in London
- Alyona Anatolievna Gromnitskaya (born 1975), poet and political spokesperson
- Nataliya Gumenyuk (born 1983) Ukrainian journalist, writer

== H ==
- Lyubov Holota (born 1949), novelist, poet, journalist, children's writer
- Hrytsko Hryhorenko, pen name of Oleksandra Sudovshchykova-Kosach (1867–1924), poet, short story writer, translator, poetry in Ukrainian, Russian and French
- Maryna Hrymych (born 1961), novelist, non-fiction writer, historian, translator
- Katrya Hrynevycheva (1875–1947), writer, journalist and community leader
- Tamara Hundorova (born 1955), literary critic and culturologist

== I ==
- Svetlana Ischenko (born 1969), poet, actress, translator, now living in Canada
- Oksana Ivanenko (1906–1997), children's writer and translator

== K ==
- Iryna Kalynets (1940–2012), poet, educator, human rights activist
- Vera Kamsha (born 1962), Ukrainian-born Russian journalist, fantasy novelist
- Patricia Kilina, pen name of Patricia Nell Warren (1936–2019), novelist, poet, editor and journalist who wrote in English and Ukrainian.
- Iya Kiva (born 1984), poet, translator, journalist, critic
- Marianna Kiyanovska (born 1973), poet, translator and literary scholar
- Nataliya Kobrynska (1851–1920), short story writer, editor, feminist
- Olha Kobylianska (1863–1942), novelist, poet, playwright, feminist
- Natalena Koroleva (1888–1966), writer
- Sonya Koshkina (born 1985), journalist, editor-in-chief
- Lina Kostenko (born 1930), popular poet, children's writer, known for her historical novel in verse
- Uliana Kravchenko, pen name of Julia Schneider (1860–1947), writer, educator and poet of German-Ukrainian ancestry
- Yevheniia Kucherenko (1922–2020), writer and pedagogue
- Olena Kysilevska (1869–1956), social activist, journalist and writer.

== L ==
- Salcia Landmann (1911–2002), writings in German in support of the Yiddish language, non-fiction writer
- Marina Lewycka (born 1946), British writer of Ukrainian origin, novelist, author of A Short History of Tractors in Ukrainian
- Clarice Lispector (1920–1977), Ukrainian-born Brazilian novelist, journalist, short story writer
- Lera Loeb (born c. 1979–1980), Ukrainian born American fashion blogger and publicist
- Lada Luzina (born 1972), pseudonym of Vladislava Kucherova, Ukrainian Russian-language author and former journalist
- Oksana Lutsyshyna (born 1974), poet, translator, and author

== M ==
- Olesya Mamchich (born 1981), poet, children's writer
- Maria Matios (born 1959), poet, novelist, some works translated into English
- Dzvinka Matiyash (born 1978), writer, poet, children's author and translator
- Natalia Matolinets (born 1990), writer
- Anastasia Melnichenko (born 1984), journalist
- Kateryna Mikhalitsyna (born 1982), poet, children's writer, translator and editor

== N ==
- Irène Némirovsky (1903–1942), Ukrainian-born French-language novelist, biographer, author of Suite française
- Bohdana Neborak (born 1995) is a writer with a podcast

== O ==
- Margarita Ormotsadze (born 1981), journalist, poet, novelist, non-fiction writer on economics

== P ==
- Atena Pashko (1931–2012), chemical engineer, poet, social activist
- Olena Pchilka (1849–1930), acclaimed poet, publisher, novelist, playwright, feminist
- Halyna Petrosanyak (born 1969), poet, writer and translator
- Mariyka Pidhiryanka (1881–1963), poet, remembered mainly for her poems for children
- Svitlana Pyrkalo (born 1976), journalist, columnist, novelist, essayist

== S ==
- Mariana Savka (born 1973), poet, children's writer, translator and publisher
- Iryna Senyk (1926–2009), poet
- Iryna Shuvalova (born 1986), poet, translator and scholar
- Lyubov Sirota (born 1956), poet, playwright, essayist, author of the Chernobyl Poems
- Żanna Słoniowska (born 1978), novelist

== T ==
- Olena Teliha (1906–1942), poet, literary activist
- Liudmila Titova, Jewish-Ukrainian poet remembered for her 1941 poem on the massacre of Ukrainian Jews
- Nika Turbina (1974–2002), Russian-language poet, writing while still a small child, several poems translated into English

== U ==
- Lesya Ukrainka, pen name of Larysa Petrivna Kosach-Kvitka (1871–1913), celebrated poet, playwright, essayist, some works translated into English

== V ==
- Iryna Vilde, pen name of Dary′na Dmy′trivna Makoho′n (1907–1982), short story writer, novelist
- Marko Vovchok, pen name of Mariya Vilinska (1833–1907), prominent short story writer, novelist, translator, wrote in Ukrainian and Russian
- Vira Vovk, pen name of Vira Ostapivna Selianska (1926–2022), poet, novelist, playwright, translator, now living in Brazil

== Y ==
- Tetiana Yakovenko (born 1954), poet, literary critic, teacher
- Lyubov Yanovska (1861–1933), short story writer, playwright, novelist
- Yevheniya Yaroshynska (1868–1904), short story writer, translator, wrote in German and Ukrainian

== Z ==
- Oksana Zabuzhko (born 1960), poet, novelist, essayist, non-fiction writer
- Iryna Zhylenko (1941–2013), poet, essayist, some of her poems translated into English

== See also ==
- List of women writers
