= Denysenko =

Denysenko is a Ukrainian surname, derived from the given name Dennis. Notable people with this surname include:

- Filaret (Denysenko) (1929–2026), Ukrainian Orthodox primate
- Iaroslav Denysenko (born 1991), Ukrainian Paralympic swimmer
- Kateryna Denysenko (born 1994), Ukrainian Paralympic swimmer
- Larysa Denysenko (born 1973), Ukrainian writer and lawyer
- Leonid Denysenko (1926–2020), Ukrainian-Australian artist
- Petro Denysenko (1920–1998), Ukrainian athlete
