= Vasyl Makhno =

Ukrainian poet, essayist, and translator (born 1964)

- Ukrainian: Василь Махно
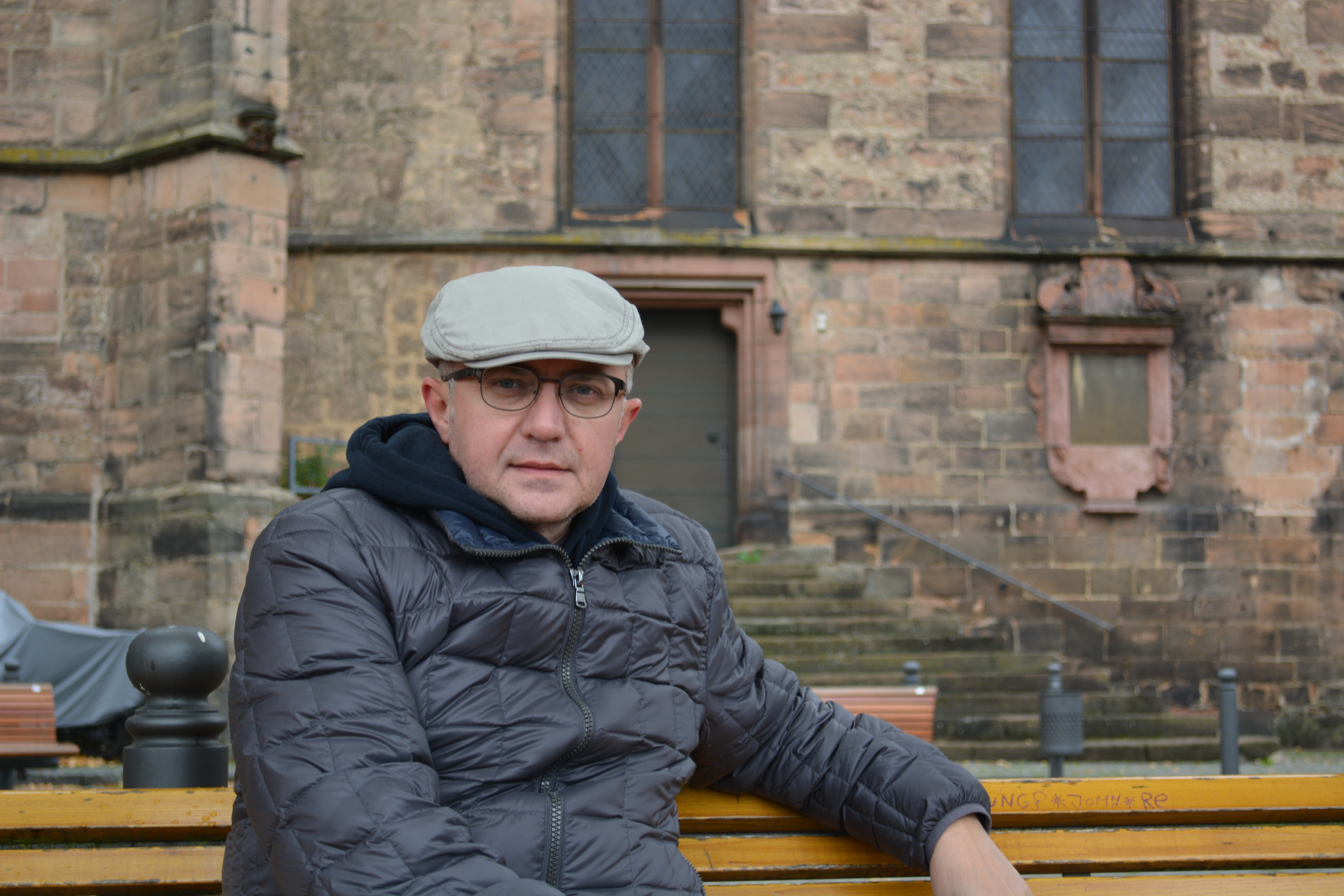
- Vasyl Makhno
- Born: October 8, 1964 (age 61); Chortkiv, Ukraine
- Education: Ternopil National Pedagogical University
- Occupations: poet, essayist, translator
- Writing career
- Language: Ukrainian
- Notable awards: International Morava Poetry Prize (2013)

Vasyl Makhno (Ukrainian: Василь Махно, born October 8, 1964, in Chortkiv) is a Ukrainian poet, essayist, and translator. He is the author of nine collections of poetry, including Winter Letters and Other Poems, translated by Orest Popovych (Spuyten Duyvil, 2011) and, most recently, I want to be Jazz and Rock’n’Roll (Ternopil, Krok, 2013). He has also published two books of essays, The Gertrude Stein Memorial Cultural and Recreation Park (2006) and Horn of Plenty (2011). Makhno has translated Zbigniew Herbert’s and Janusz Szuber’s poetry from Polish into Ukrainian. His poems and essays have been translated into 25 languages, and he is the 2013 recipient of Serbia’s Povele Morave Prize in Poetry. Makhno currently lives in New York City.

== Biography ==
The poet Vasyl Makhno was born in Chortkiv, in the Ukrainian province of Ternopil, in 1964. After completing his studies at the Pedagogical Institute in Ternopil, he graduated in literature and worked as a lecturer at the college. In 1999 his doctoral thesis about Bohdan-Ihor Antonych, a prominent representative of Ukrainian modernism, was published.

Makhno’s early collections of poetry, including Knyha pahorbiv ta hodyn (1996; t: The book of hills and hours) and Liutnevi elehii ta inshi virshi (1998; t: February elegies and other poems) are still in this modernist tradition. After his travels to Western Europe and after teaching at the Jagiellonian University in Kraków in the late nineties, he moved to New York City in 2000. His collection of poetry, Plavnyk ryby (2002; t: The fish fin) – half written in Europe, half in the United States is a visible testimony to this transition. In Makhno’s "complex metaphorical imagery and dense verbal texture of his poetry, as well as the nearly anarchic utilization of grammar in his works, with virtually no punctuation", new images emerged (translator Michael M. Naydan). Verve and variety, as well as the profane, now dominate the observant cadence of his free verse and create a stimulating contrast to his weighty diction and nature metaphors. "Our Ukrainian culture... is part of the tradition that assumes a romanticized approach to poets, to poetry writing and so on. Because of that, various taboos took root: you can write about this, but not about that. Thus, for many people it is hard to let go of these stereotypes", the poet commented in an interview about developments in recent Ukrainian poetry, which he has helped to carry forward.

"Makhno poetic melos is shaped by a number of prosodic systems – vers libre, metric versification, stanzaic arrangement, thus rendering it richly polyphonic. It is rich in resonant alliterations, internal and disjoint rhymes without however becoming overly musical and without impeding its central function – its narrative propensity". - John Fizer, Professor-Emeritus at Rutgers University

"With a foundation in the international community of letters, Winter Letters reminds us of the universal power of art". -Judith Baumel about the collection Winter Letters

"Whoever believes in the power of language and of imagery to first stun then capture rather than explain reality will also love these poems. Makhno gift is his meticulous riffs fed by memory and imagination. Everything superfluous is cut out and concentrated into a single intensity that blows through the reader like a saxophone riff or a late-night blizzard that overtakes her/him in the wintry orchards of New York City streets". - Dzvinia Orlowsky about the collection Winter Letters

"Makhno’s living speech of the reality of his homeland is combined with his strive for the new discoveries, and together they create rich and poignant poetry. It is the living speech of the new Ukrainian poetry, liberated from the discourse of liberation. Or perhaps it is not quite so; perhaps, poetry is the space of silences between home and the brave new world; between old home and new home; poetry is exempt". - Oksana Lutsyshyna about the collection Winter Letters

"Vasyl Makhno celebrates New York with all its ups and downs, even if at first he does so with a dose of considerable hesitation if not outright reluctance. His New York comes across as a site of archaeological importance, a site in which he digs layer upon layer of textual deposits left by his predecessors and contemporaries". - Maria Rewakowicz about the collection Cornelia Street Café

== Bibliography ==
=== Collections ===
Poetry

In Ukrainian:

- Skhyma (Schyma). 1993.
- Samotnist’ Tsezaria (Loneliness of Caesar). 1994.
- Knyha pahorbiv ta hodyn (The Book of Hills and Hours). 1996.
- Liutnevi elehii ta inshi virshi (February Elegies and Others Poems). 1998.
- Plavnyk ryby (The Fish’s Fin). 2002.
- 38 virshiv pro N’iu-Iork i deshcho inshe (38 Poems About New York And Something Else). 2004.
- Cornelia Street Café. 2007
- Zymovi lysty (Winter Letters). 2011
- Ia khochu buty dzhazom i rok-n-rolom (I want to be Jazz and Rock’n’Roll). 2013
- Jerusalem poems. 2016
- Paperovyi mist (Paper bridge). 2017

Prose

- Dim v Beyting Hollow (The house in Baiting Hollow). 2015
- Vichnyi kalendar (The eternal calendar). 2019

Anthology

- Deviatdesiatnyky: Antolohiia novoi ukrains’koi poezii (Poets of Nineties: An Anthology of New Ukrainian Poetry). Edited by Vasyl Makhno. Ternopil, Lileia 1998.

Translations from Polish

- Zbigniew Herbert. Struna svitla, 1996.
- Janusz Szuber. Spiimanyi u sit’, 2007

Literary Criticism

- Khudozhnii svit Bohdana-Ihoria Antonycha (The Artistic World of Bohdan-Ihor Antonych). 1999.

Essays

- Park kultury i vidpochynku imeni Gertrudy Stain (The Gertrude Stein Memorial Culture and Recreation Park), 2007
- Kotyllasia torba (Horn of Plenty), 2011
- Okolytsi ta pohranychchia (Neighborhoods and borders), 2019.
- Usdovzh okeanu na roveri (On a bike along the ocean), 2020.

Plays

- Coney Island, 2006
- Bitch/Beach Generation, 2007

Books in English translation

- Thread And Selected New York Poems, 2009
- Winter Letters: & Other Poems, 2011

Books in Polish translation

- Wedrowcy. Poznan, 2003
- 34 wiersze o Nowym Jorku i nie tylko. Wroclaw, 2006
- Nitka, Sejny. 2009
- Dubno, kolo Lezajska. Lezajsk, 2013
- Listy i powietrze. Lublin, 2015
- Kalendarz wieczności. Warsaw, 2021

Books in Russian translation

- «Куры не летают». Kharkov, 2016
- Частный комметарий к истории. Dnipro, 2018
- Вечный календарь. Kharkov, 2021

Books in Serbian translation

- Crna rupa poezije. Filip Visnic, 2013
- Свадбарски купус. Beograd 2017

Book in Romanian translation

- Fiecare obiect îşi are locul său: poezii alese. Craiova, Scrisul Românesc Fundația Editura, 2009

Book in German translation

- Das Haus in Baiting Hollow. Leipzig 2020

Critical writings about Vasyl Makhno;

- Chernetsky, Vitaly. From Anarchy to Connectivity to Cognitive Mapping: Contemporary Ukrainian Writers of the Younger Generation Engage with Globalization Canadian-American Slavic Studies; 2010, Vol. 44 Issue 1-2, p. 102
- Lutzyshyna, Oksana. “Winter Letters” Across Time and Space. The Ukrainian Weekly. 2012, June 10, p. 10
- Rewakowicz, Maria. Thread and Selected New York Poems. Journal of Ukrainian Studies;2010/2011, Vol. 35/36, p. 391
- Rudnytzky, Leonid. A Poetical Voice of the Ukrainian Diaspora: Random Notes on the Poetry of Vasyl Makhno. Ukrainian Quarterly; Spring-Winter 2012, Vol. 68 Issue 1-4, p. 158

== Awards ==
- International Morava Poetry Prize (2013)
- BBC Ukraine Book of the year (2015)
- Encounter: The Ukrainian-Jewish Literary Prize (2020)
