= Yuliya Musakovska =

Ukrainian poet

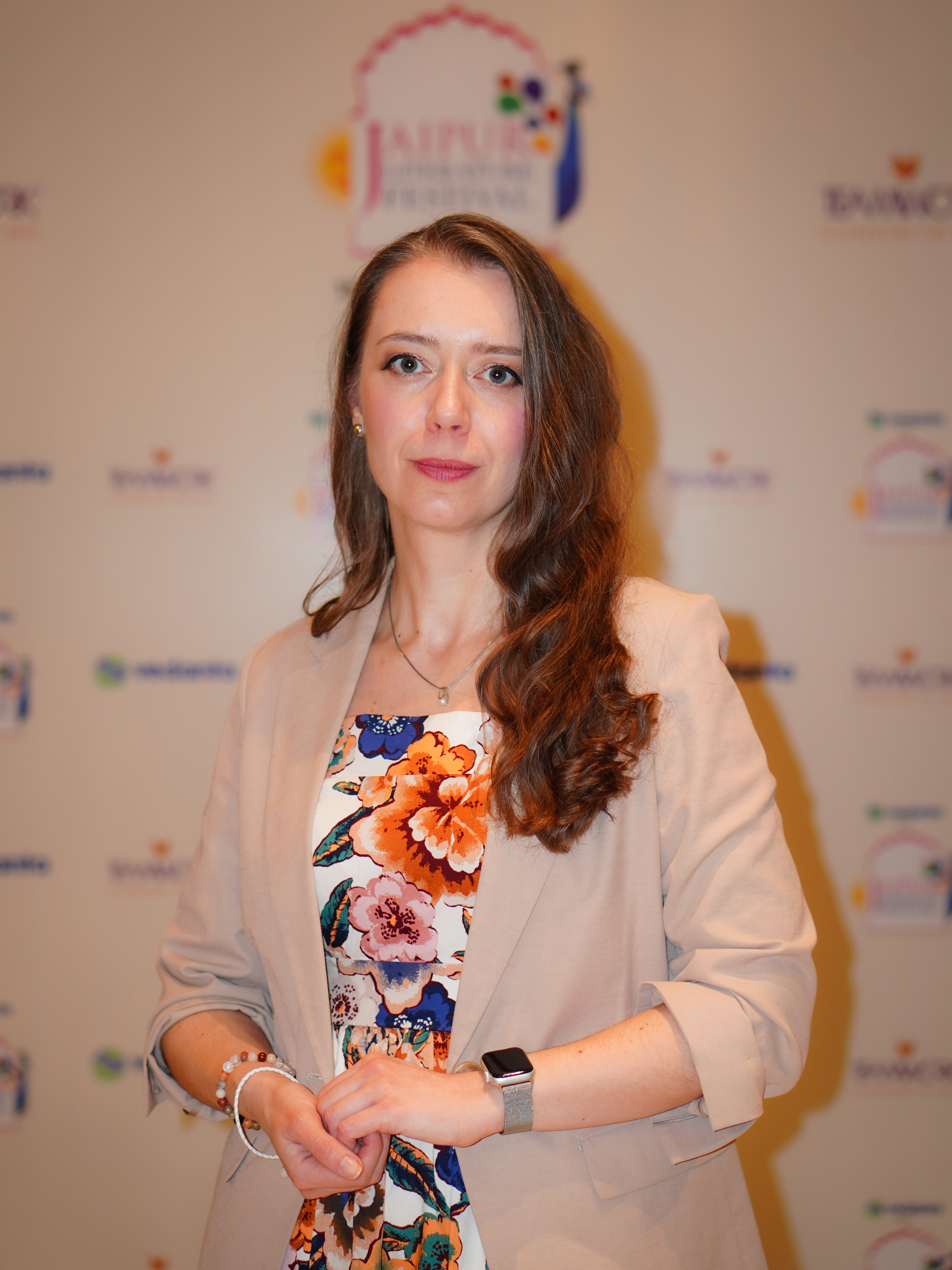
- Born: 9 July 1982 (age 44)
- Occupations: poet and translator
- Writing career
- Subjects: poetry and translation of Swedish and English into Ukrainian
- Notable awards: The Asian Prize for Poetry (2025), The Diana Der Hovenessian Prize (2025), DICTUM Prize (2014), Smoloskyp Prize for Poetry (2010)

Yuliya Musakovska (born July 9, 1982, Lviv, Ukraine) is a Ukrainian poet and translator. She is the author of poetry collections such as Exhaling, Inhaling (2010), Masks (2011), Hunting for Silence (2014), Men, Women and Children, The God of Freedom (2021), and Stones and Nails (2024). Collections of her poetry in translation have been released in Poland and Sweden. Her poems have been translated into over thirty languages and widely published across the globe. A full length English translation of Musakovska's poetry, The God of Freedom, was published by Arrowsmith Press in 2024.

She has received numerous literary awards, including the prestigious Smoloskyp Prize for young authors (2010) and the DICTUM Prize, awarded by the Krok Publishing House (2014). Musakovska has participated in various festivals and cultural events in Ukraine and abroad. She is also a member of PEN Ukraine.

== Biography ==
Yuliya Musakovska was born in Lviv in 1982, where she lives and works. In 2005, she received a master's degree in international affairs from Lviv National University. Since 2007, she has worked in the IT industry in the field of marketing and communications. She is a frequent speaker at professional events and a guest lecturer at the Lviv Business School of the Ukrainian Catholic University.

Musakovska has participated in literature festivals in Ukraine and abroad, including BookForum, Meridian Czernowitz, Book Arsenal, Book Space, Air Fest (Ukraine); Kaunas Literature Week (Lithuania), Katowice Jazz Art Festival (Poland), Authors' Reading Month (Czech Republic), Mediterranean Literature Festival (Malta), Norwegian Literature Festival, Oslo International Poetry Festival, Akerselva Literature Festival (Norway), and Poetry Africa (South Africa).

== Literary work ==
The first major selection of Musakovska's poems appeared in the Kyivan Rus literary journal in September 2008. Her work has been published in major Ukrainian magazines including Zolota Doba (Golden Age), Chetver (Thursday), Berezil, Kurier Kryvbasu (Courier of Kryvbas), and RADAR, as well as in numerous anthologies.

Her debut poetry collection was published in 2010 by the Fakt publishing house in Kyiv. In the same year, Musakovska won several literary awards in Ukraine, including the prominent Smoloskyp Poetry Prize for young authors, which led to the publication of her collection Masks in 2011. Later she received the DICTUM Prize from the Krok Publishing House, which resulted in the publication of her third poetry collection, Hunting for Silence, in 2014.

In 2015, The Old Lion Publishing House released her book of poetry, Men, Women and Children, featuring artwork by the Agrafka Art Studio. The following year, the collection won the Best Design of the Year award at the Book Arsenal Festival in Kyiv.

In 2021, Musakovska's book The God of Freedom was published. This poetry collection was included in PEN Ukraine's 2021 Best Books list and the 2021 New Books From Ukraine catalogue, which comprises books recommended for translation by the Ukrainian Book Institute.

Musakovska's works have been published in the following anthologies in English:

- The Frontier: 28 Contemporary Ukrainian Poets: An Anthology (A Bilingual Edition), Glagoslav Publications, 2017;
- Letters from Ukraine: Poetry Anthology, Krok, 2016;
- New York Elegies: Ukrainian Poems on the City, Academic Studies Press, 2019;
- Voice of Freedom: Contemporary Writing from Ukraine, 8th & Atlas Publishing, 2022;
- In the Hour of War: Poetry from Ukraine, Arrowsmith Press, 2023

== Translations ==
Yuliya Musakovska's poems have been translated into more than thirty languages, including English, Swedish, Norwegian, Polish, Lithuanian, Estonian, German, Italian, Spanish, Portuguese, Georgian, Maltese, Hebrew, Malayalam, and Chinese. Her work has been widely published in literary periodicals, anthologies, and online publications abroad.

In 2022, her bilingual collection Iron [Залізо/Żelazo], with Polish translation by Aneta Kaminska, was published by the Borderland Foundation in Poland.

In December 2022, American historian Timothy Snyder translated Musakovska's poem "Such Problematic, Such Frightful Poems" ["Такі незручні, такі страшні вірші…"] about Russia's full-scale invasion of Ukraine and recited it in Lecture 22 of his Yale University course “The Making of Modern Ukraine,” which has been widely viewed on YouTube. Professor Snyder also published his translation and commentary on his blog.

In 2023, Musakovska's collection Stones and Nails [Stenar och spik], translated by Mikael Nydahl, was published in Sweden in collaboration between the publishers ellerstroms and Ariel.

== Bibliography ==
- Exhaling, Inhaling [На видих і на вдих] (Fakt, 2010)
- Masks [Маски] (Smoloskyp, 2011)
- Hunting for Silence [Полювання на тишу] (Krok Publishing House)
- Men, Women and Children [Чоловіки, жінки і діти] (The Old Lion Publishing House, 2015)
- The God of Freedom [Бог свободи] (The Old Lion Publishing House, 2021)
- Iron [Залізо/Żelazo] (Borderland Foundation, 2022)
- Stones and Nails [Каміння і цвяхи] (The Old Lion Publishing House, 2024)

Musakovska translates Swedish poetry into Ukrainian and has published her translations of Tomas Tranströmer's work on Lyrikline.org. She also translates contemporary Ukrainian poets into English. She is a translator of the frontline poetry collection We Were Here by a Ukrainian soldier poet Artur Dron' (Jantar Publishing, 2024).

== Awards ==
- “Hranoslov” Poetry Award, 2008;
- Bohdan Antonych Poetry Prize, 2009;
- Ostroh Academy's “Vytoky” Award for Poetry, 2010;
- “Smoloskyp” Prize for Poetry, 2010;
- “Koronaciya Slova” Prize for Song Lyrics, 2011;
- DICTUM Prize by Krok Publishing House, 2014;
- Best Book Design of the Year for the poetry collection “Men, Women and Children” illustrated by Agrafka Art Studio, 2016.
- The Diana Der Hovanessian Prize for poetry translation, 2025;
- The Asian Prize for Poetry, 2025.

== Multimedia projects ==
- A poetry film [Глина] “The Clay,” created by director Oleksandr Fraze-Frazenko, with poems and voice by Yuliya Musakovska. The premiere took place in 2016 at the Book Arsenal International Festival in Kyiv and in 2017 at the BookForum Festival in Lviv.
- A project called [Кругообіг] “Circulation,” based on Musakovska's poems and with music by bass guitarist Taras Puzyr and percussionist Luka-Teodor Hanulyak, was presented in 2018 at the BookForum Festival.
- A project called [Пришестя] “The Coming,” based on the poems from her book “The God of Freedom” in collaboration with Michael Balog, a musician, composer, and founder of the Vedel School of modern music. It was presented in 2021 as a part of the Poetry and Music Night program at the BookForum Festival.
- A project called “Cultural Intervention,” in collaboration with singer and actress Marichka Shtyrbulova and director Ira Melkonyan, was presented at the 2022 Mediterranean Literary Festival organized by Inizjamed in Valletta, Malta.
- A mural based on Musakovska's poem, “Safe Place,” initiated by cultural center Katowice Miasto Ogrodow and commissioned by the European Cultural Foundation. It was created by the artist Bohdana Davydyuk in Katowice, Poland, in September 2022.

== Translated works ==
=== English ===
- “A Home to Freedom”, "The Spartan Boy", "Jesus of War", Apofenie, May 16, 2022.
- “4 poems by Yuliya Musakovska”, Springhouse Journal, March 2022.
- “The August Story”, The Common, May 2023.
- “Boyhood”, “The Scratch”, Two Lines Journal, April 2023.
- “Words,” “Safe Place”, “Metaphors”, VerseVille, Issue XXXIII, June 2022.
- "Such Love", AGNI, Issue 95, 2022.
- “Tenderness”, One Art: A Journal of Poetry, August 25, 2022.
- “The Spartan Boy”, The Red Letters, August 26, 2022.
- “Poems by Yuliya Musakovska,” ExiledInk Magazine, Issue 5, 2022
- “A Portfolio of Poetry”, Tupelo Quarterly, December 14, 2022.
- “Five Hearts”, “The Hatching”, NELLE #6, 2023.
- “Summer's End”, “A Decade-Long Road”, The Continental Literary Magazine, Spring 2023.
- “Angel of Maydan”, “The Sorceress' Oath”, The Common, April 2023 Poetry Feature
- “People like these,” an essay by Yuliya Musakovska, Chytomo, April 5, 2023.
- “Five Poems by Yuliya Musakovska,” AzonaL #6, 2023.
- "Lord, Tell Me", "A Soldier is Born", London Ukrainian Review, August 24, 2023.
- The God of Freedom, Arrowsmith Press, 2024 [full length poetry collection].

=== Other languages ===
- Yuliya Musakovska's poems translated into Spanish by Jacobo Bergareche, The Objective, September 2, 2022
- “Em meio à fumaça negra” — two poems by Yuliya Musakovska translated into Portuguese by Fergath, Revista A Palavra Solta, June 1, 2022
- “Chi ha detto che ora le parole non hanno valore?” — a poem by Yuliya Musakovska translated into Italian by Emilia Mirazhiyska, Inkroci Literary Magazine, March 17, 2022
- “Un'orto fatto d'ossa” — a poem by Yuliya Musakovska translated into Italian by Alessandro Achilli, Di Sesta e di Settima Grandezza — Avvistamenti di poesia, a cura di Alfredo Rienzi, June 19, 2022
- “Hver melding om død” — selected poems translated into Norwegian by Marina Gobbel, the Blog of Oslo Public Libraries, March 27, 2022
- Poems from the collection “Men, Women and Children” translated into Lithuanian by Vytas Dekšnys and Daiva Čepauskaite, Metai Literary Journal, issue 7, 2017
- Yuliya Musakovska's poems translated into Maltese by Adrian Grima, Antoinette Borg, and Alex Farrugia, Torca, September 4, 2017
- “‘המלחמה שאת סוחבת בכיס החזה” — selected poems translated into Hebrew by Olexander Averbuch, the Blog of the National Library of Israel, March 10, 2022
- “如此的爱", "紧急逃生包” — two poems by Yuliya Musakovska translated into Chinese, edited by Tong Wei, 今天 issue 133, April 2022

== Media materials ==
- "Hunting for Silence" — a review of Yuliya Musakovska's book by Svitlana Bohdan, Krytyka, December 2015, Year XIX, Issue 7-8 (213-214)
- Safe Place: An Interview with Ukrainian Poet Yuliya Musakovska from Lviv, Ukraine by Laima Vince, May 3, 2022
- For the Record: Conversations with Ukrainian Writers During War by Arrowsmith Production — Yuliya Musakovska
- PEN Dialogues on War: Yuliya Musakovska and Dave Eggers
- A poem [Хто сказав, що слова зараз не мають ваги?] “Words” read by the author for PEN International's 2023 Video Poetry Marathon for Mother Language Day "Making Silenced Languages Visible”
- Selected poetry by Yuliya Musakovska read by the author and others, SoundCloud
- “Lord, tell me…” — a poem by Yuliya Musakovska in English translation | read by Kirk Lawrence-Howard
