= Kateryna Kalytko =

Ukrainian poet, writer and translator (born 1982)

- Катерина Калитко
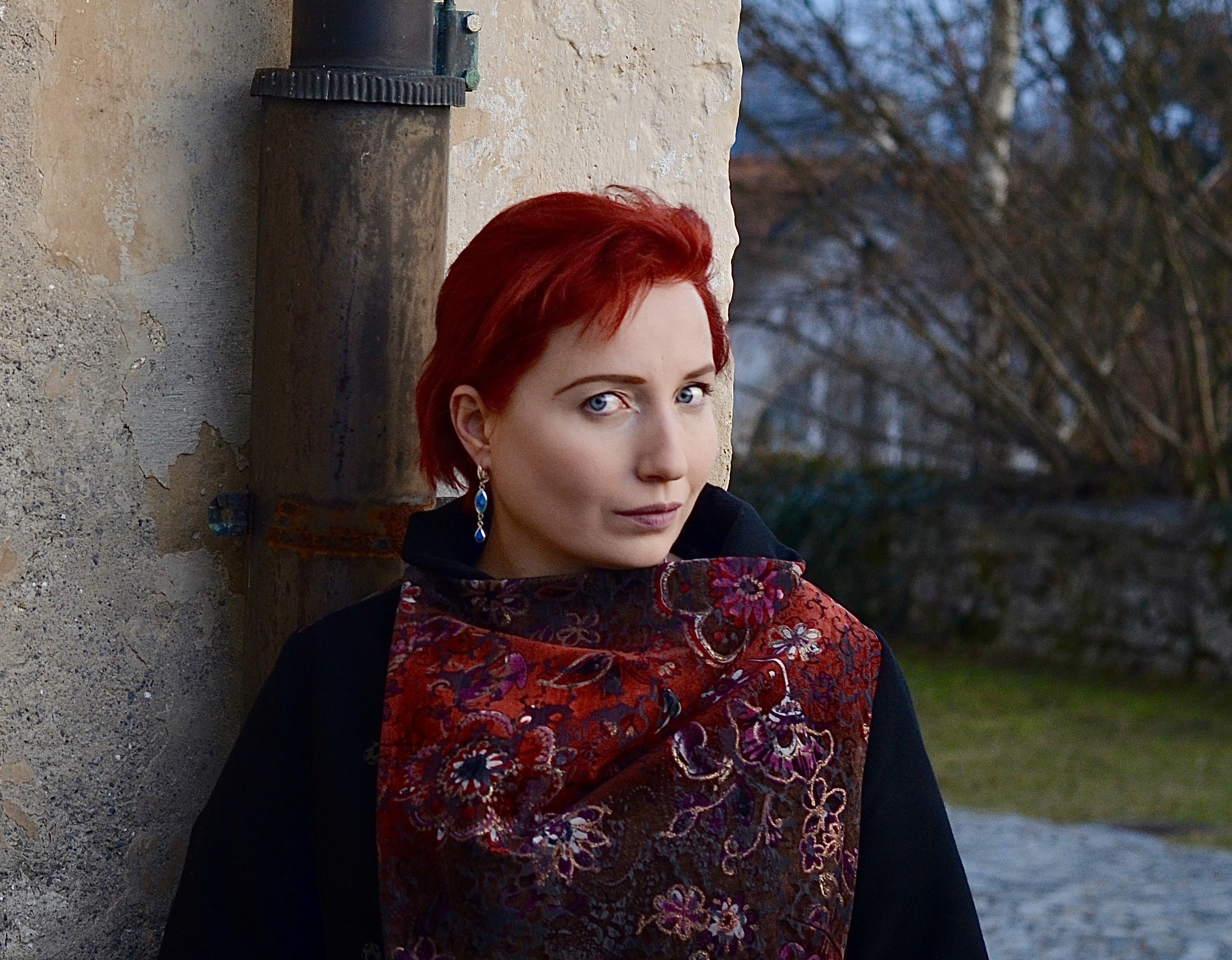
- Kalytko in 2019
- Born: 8 March 1982 (age 44); Vinnytsia, Ukrainian SSR, Soviet Union
- Education: National University of Kyiv-Mohyla Academy
- Occupations: Poet; writer; translator
- Awards: see here

Kateryna Oleksandrivna Kalytko (Ukrainian: Катерина Олександрівна Калитко; born 8 March 1982) is a Ukrainian poet, writer and translator, She is a member of PEN Ukraine, and since 2000 the National Writers' Union of Ukraine.

Her poetry is distinguished by intricate imagery, which frequently captures the associativeness of the poet and the tragedy of existence.

== Early life and education ==
Born on 8 March 1982, in the Ukrainian city of Vinnytsia. Kalytko attended the National University of Kyiv-Mohyla Academy to study political science and media from 1999 to 2005. Apart from Vinnytsia, Kalytko also resides in Sarajevo, where she studies and translates Bosnia and Herzegovina's contemporary literature, namely pieces by Emir Kusturica, Milet Prodanovich, Mykhailo Pantych, Uglesh Šaytinats, and others.

== Career ==
Kalytko co-wrote the short prose book М.істерія with the Kyiv publishing company "Fact" in 2007. The book Land of the Lost, or Little Scary Tales, which was released by Old Lion Publishing House, won the 2017 BBC Book of the Year Award. The collection won the 2019 LitAccent of the Year award under the Poetry category. He received an invitation to compose a piece for the Radio Dictator of National Unity in 2023. That same year, the Shevchenko National Prize was awarded to Kalytko, for the poetry collection Орден мовчальниць won her an award.

English, German, Polish, Armenian, Lithuanian, Slovenian, Serbian, Bulgarian, Italian, and Hebrew translations are among her works. She received the Metaphora translation award as well as the magazine prize known as the Кур’єр Кривбасу for her translations.

== Works ==
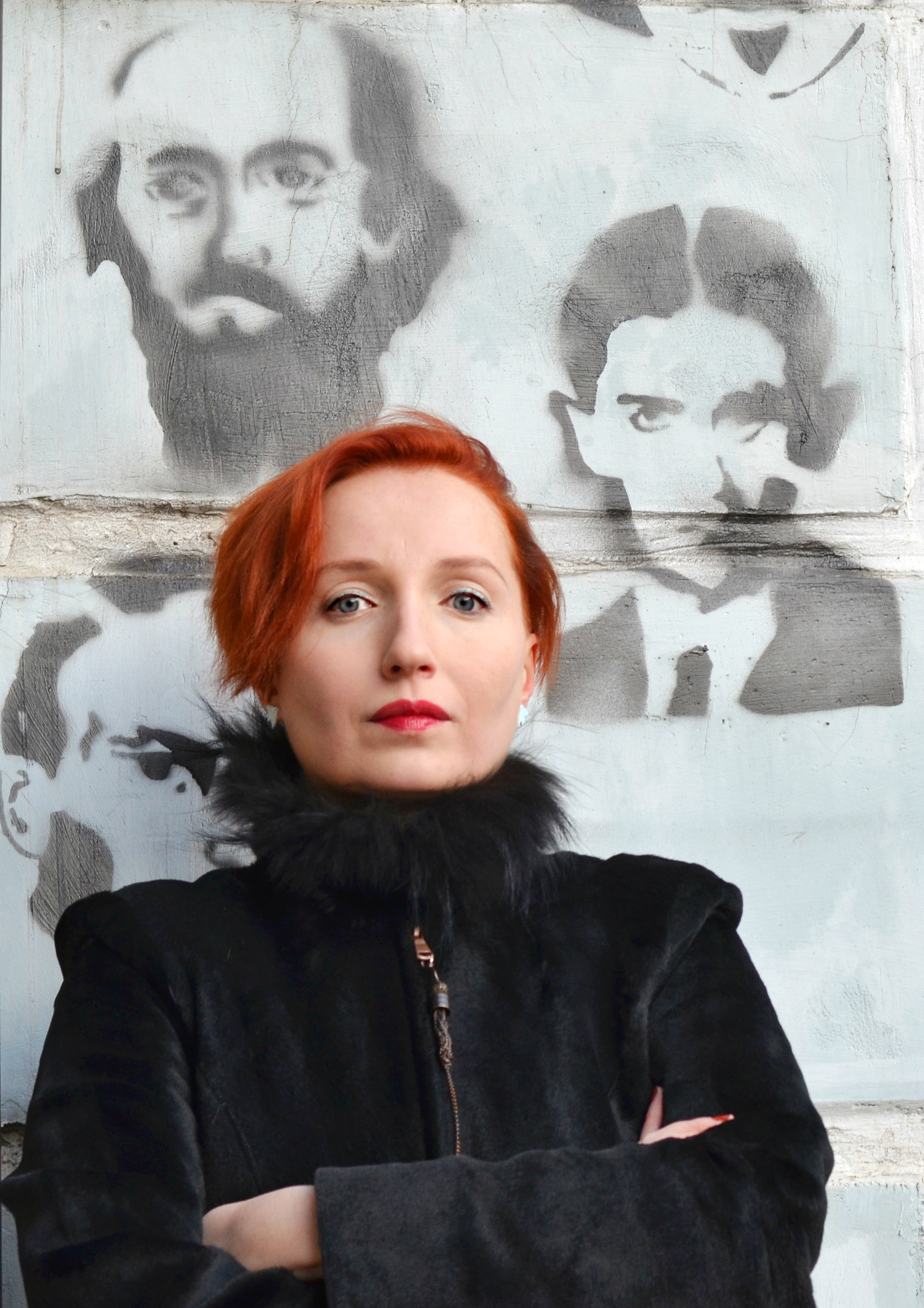
Kalytko in 2017

=== Poetry ===
Sources:

- Посібник зі створення світу (1999)
- Сьогоднішнє завтрашнє (2001)
- Портретування асфальту (2004)
- Діалоги з Одіссєем (2005)
- Сезон штормів (2013)
- Катівня. Виноградник. Дім (2014)
- Бунар (2018)
- Ніхто нас тут не знає, і ми – нікого (2019)
- Орден мовчальниць (2021)

=== Translation ===
- Туфлі до вручення Оскара (Melina Kamerić, 2013)
- Історії про людей і тварин (Miljenko Jergović, 2013)
- Срда співає в сутінках, на Трійцю (Miljenko Jergović, 2014)
- Смерть – неперевірена чутка (Emir Kusturica, 2014)
- Сагіб (Nenad Velychkovych, 2014)
- Аркадія (Mileta Prodanovich, 2015)
- Прогулянка хмарами (Mykhailo Pantych, 2015)
- Дуже скромні дари (Uglješa Šajtinac, 2016)
- Сараєво для початківців (Ozren Kebo, 2017)
- Дервіш і смерть (Meša Selimović, 2017)
- Іншалла, Мадонно, іншалла (Miljenko Jergović, 2018)

== Influences ==
Spanish poet and scholar Federico García Lorca, a proponent of pantheism and a master of connections and intuitive sense of the universe, is one of her favorite writers.

== Political positions ==
Kalytko claimed in an interview that she had always known a Russian-Ukrainian conflict was inevitable. She was critical of Ukrainian society before the Revolution of Dignity, stating that "everyone here is infantile, idealess, and when the war begins, everyone will run away somewhere." She later felt terrible guilt over this.

== Personal life ==
Kalytko's mother suffered a great deal when giving birth to her as a result of the callous disregard for her needs displayed by physicians and midwives who, on March 8, insulted her sentiments and refused to listen to her pleas. Instead, they hurriedly sat down to celebrate International Women's Day. As an adult, she detests March 8 in its current form, her birthday, and the lack of female camaraderie and respect that older women show for younger ones. Additionally, when she was five years old, she quietly informed her grandma that she had no intention of getting married and that guys just caused her trouble since they were bothersome.

== Awards and recognitions ==
Kalytko has received awards and recognitions such as:

- Shevchenko National Prize (2023)
- LitAccent of the Year (2019)
- Laureate of Women in Arts Award's Literate category (2019)
- The Lviv — UNESCO City of Literature Award (2019)
- Joseph Konrad-Kozhenowski Literary Prize (2017)
- BBC Book of the Year Award (2017)
- Vilenica Crystal (2016)
- Fellowship at the Writer's Program of the Central European Initiative (2015)
- Metaphora Award (2014)
- Blagovest Award (2001)
