= Vitaly Korotich =

Ukrainian poet and journalist (1936–2025)

- Виталий Коротич; Виталій Коротич
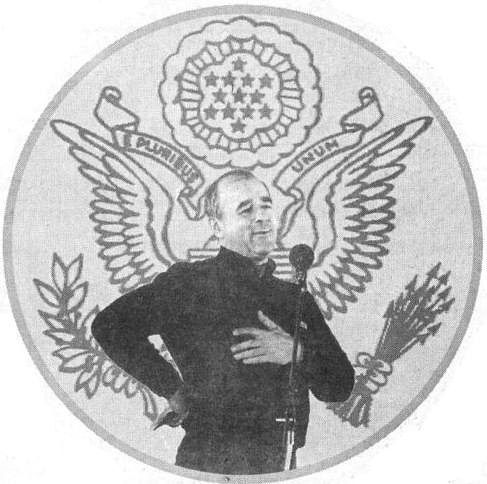
- Born: 26 May 1936; Kyiv, Ukrainian SSR, USSR
- Died: 29 September 2025 (aged 89); Moscow, Russia
- Education: Kyiv Medical University
- Occupations: Writer, journalist

Vitaly Alekseevich Korotich (Russian: Виталий Алексеевич Коротич; Ukrainian: Віталій Олексійович Коротич, Vitaliy Oleksiyovych Korotych; 26 May 1936 – 29 September 2025) was a Soviet, Ukrainian and Russian writer, journalist, poet and KGB agent.

== Life and career ==
Korotich was born on 26 May 1936 in Kyiv. He graduated from the Kyiv Medical University in 1959 and worked as a doctor between 1959 and 1966. Later, he became a full-time writer, and served as an officer of the Union of Soviet Writers.

In the late 1970s, Korotich became the editor of Vsesvit, a Ukrainian literary magazine in Kyiv specializing in publishing literary works translated from foreign languages. His magazine was described at the time as one "that probably prints more of the latest American fiction than any magazine in Moscow."

In 1976, Korotich spent three weeks as a writer-in-residence at the University of Kansas in Lawrence, Kansas. In 1984, still the editor-in-chief of Vsesvit, he was in New York as a member of the Ukrainian SSR's delegation at the United Nations General Assembly. In 1985, he visited Canada as well, participating in a campaign for world peace and for nuclear disarmament.

In the late 1980s and early 1990s Korotich was editor-in-chief of Ogonyok magazine in Moscow, which made, some say, a substantial contribution to the promotion of media freedom in the former USSR. The Ogonyok magazine, at the time when Korotich was at its head, was regarded as a "megaphone" for the perestroika and glasnost policies of the last USSR President Mikhail Gorbachev.

In 1992 Korotich went to the United States and was a visiting professor of journalism at Boston University, also lecturing at Boston College on 19 October.

According to Korotich, he did not have a Ukrainian passport. He believed that Crimea should be under Russian protectorate and independent from Ukraine. He later approved of the Russian invasion of his native Ukraine. In 2024, he stated that "a war is being waged against Russia", while "Ukraine is just an expandable." He also called Volodymyr Zelenskyi "one of the most obedient American satellites" and said that Americans "forbid him from negotiating peace" and "could oust Zelensky" if he tried to negotiate with Russians again. Korotich died on 29 September 2025.

== Cooperation with KGB ==
In 1963, he was recruited by the KGB and was referred to as Agent Yanvarsky. His three-month stay in Canada in 1965 was believed to "contribute to the process of further disintegration of Ukrainian nationalist organisations abroad." Korotich was also informing the KGB against Ukrainian dissident poet Ivan Drach and the head of the Association of United Ukrainian Canadians, Petro Kravchuk.

== Literary activities ==
Korotych was an author of several works of prose and poetry in Ukrainian language.
