= Iryna Starovoyt =

Ukrainian poet, essayist, translator and critic

Iryna Starovoyt (Ukrainian: Ірина Миколаївна Старовойт; born 6 July 1975) is a Ukrainian poet, essayist, translator cultural studies scholar and literary critic. She has published a number of essays and three collections of poetry. Staravoyt is a professor at the Ukrainian Catholic University, and was awarded the Key to the City by the Lviv City Mayor.

== Early life and education ==
Starovoyt was born in Lviv in 1975. In 1997, she graduated from the Faculty of Philology at the University of Lviv. She defended her thesis on Ukrainian postmodernism in 2001.

== Career ==
From 2004 to 2016, Starovoyt taught at the Department of Literary Theory and Comparative Literature at the University of Lviv, and since 2016 at the Department of Cultural Studies at the Ukrainian Catholic University, where she is an associate professor. She has been a virtual writer-in-residence at Trent University and Durham College in Canada, and a Visiting Fellow at the University of Oxford.

Starovoyt writes in Ukrainian, Polish, Russian, Yiddish and English. Starovoyt’s work has been translated into Polish, Lithuanian, English, Romanian and Armenian. She writes about “the neglected 20th century generational memories and new traumatic context of its retelling in Eastern Europe and particularly in Ukraine”. Stravoyt's poetry debut was Vzhe ne prozori [No Longer Limpid] which was published in 1997. In 2017 Starovoyt’s poetry collection A Field of Foundlings was the first of her work published in English translation. It was published by the Lost Horse Press in the US, and translated by Grace Mahoney.

Staravoyt hosted a literary review programme on regional television.

Starovoyt was awarded the Key to the City by the Lviv City Mayor. She is the Head of the Jury for the transnational literary prize UNESCO's City of Literature based in Lviv, and is an appointed expert for the "Translate Ukraine" program.

== Publications ==
- No Longer Limpid (1997) (Ukrainian: Вже не прозорі)
- Groningen manuscript (2014) (Ukrainian: Гронінгенський рукопис)
- A Field of Foundlings: Poems (2017) (Translated by Grace Mahoney)
