= Dzvinia Orlowsky =

American poet

- Дзвіня Орловська
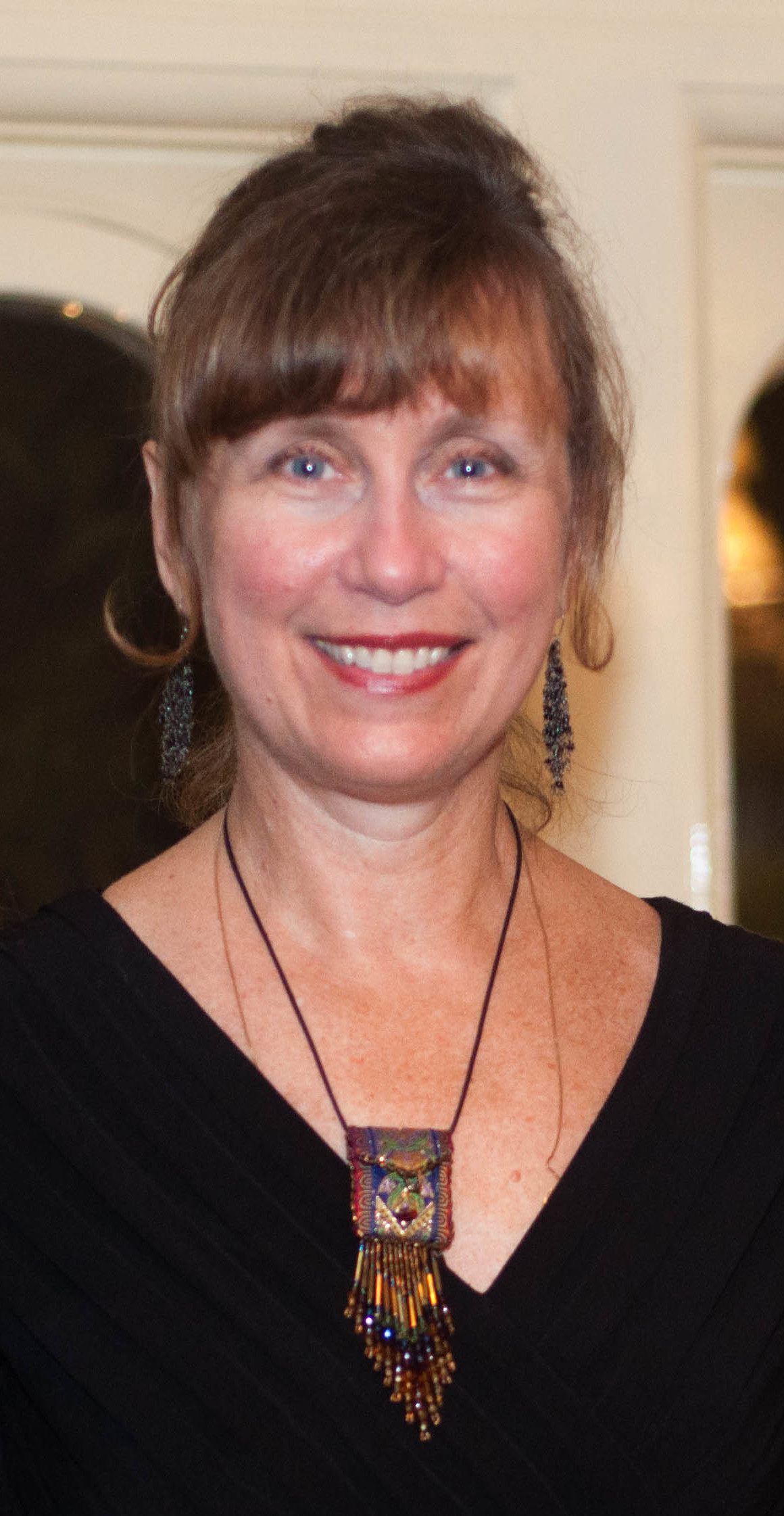
- After a reading at Boston University in 2014
- Born: Cambridge, Ohio, United States
- Occupations: Poet; translator; editor; teacher
- Writing career
- Notable awards: 2026 David Ferry and Ellen LaForge Prize in Poetry and Poetic Translation 2026 Pushcart Prize 2025 PEN Award for Poetry in Translation finalist 2022 1st Ampersand Poetry Prize for Poetry and Fiction selected by Bruce Weigl 2021 New England Poetry Club's Diana Der Hovanessian Prize selected by Jean Dany Joachim 2019 New England Poetry Club’s Samuel Washington Allen Prize selected by Robert Pinsky 2007 Pushcart Prize
- Literary movement: Deep image; New Internationalism

Dzvinia Orlowsky is a Ukrainian-American poet, translator, and editor. She is the author of seven poetry collections published by Carnegie Mellon University Press, including Those Absences Now Closest (2024).

Her honors include two National Endowment for the Arts Literature Translation Fellowships and a 2007 and 2026 Pushcart Prize. A founding editor of Four Way Books, Orlowsky is known for her work co-translating contemporary Ukrainian poetry with Ali Kinsella, including the writings of Natalka Bilotserkivets and Halyna Kruk, as well as Oleksander Dovzhenko’s The Enchanted Desna. In her recent work, she introduced a variation of the cento form called the numbered-line cento, composed entirely from lines occupying the same ordinal position in source poems. Orlowsky serves as Writer-in-Residence in Poetry at the Solstice MFA Program at Lasell University, and is a contributing editor to Solstice Literary Magazine, and AGNI.

== Life ==
Dzvinia Orlowsky was born in Cambridge, Ohio, to Ukrainian immigrant parents. She earned a Bachelor of Arts degree from Oberlin College and a Master of Fine Arts from the Warren Wilson College MFA Program for Writers. She interned for Adventures in Poetry, New York City, 1975 and attended the Jack Kerouac School of Disembodied Poetics, Naropa Institute in 1976.

Jeff Friedman's and her co-translation of Memorials by Polish poet Mieczyslaw Jastrun for which she and Friedman were awarded a 2016 National Endowment for the Arts Literature Translation Fellowship was published by Dialogos in 2014.

Her co-translations with Ali Kinsella from the Ukrainian of selected poems by Natalka Bilotserkivets, Eccentric Days of Hope and Sorrow, was published by Lost Horse Press in fall, 2021 and short-listed for the 2022 Griffin International Poetry Prize, the Derek Walcott Poetry Prize, the ALTA National Translation Award, and awarded the 2020-2021 American Association for Ukrainian Studies Translation Prize. Their co-translations from the Ukrainian of Halyna Kruk's poetry, Lost in Living, for which they were awarded a 2024 National Endowment for the Arts Translation grant was published by Lost Horse Press in 2024 and was a finalist for the 2025 PEN Award for Poetry in Translation. In 2026 Lost Horse Press published their co-translation from the Ukrainian of Oleksander Dovzhenko's The Enchanted Desna.

In addition to the above, other honors include a Pushcart Prize (2007; 2026); A Massachusetts Cultural Council Professional Development Grant (1999); a Massachusetts Cultural Council Poetry Grant (1998); She has also been a finalist in the Grolier Prize, The Academy of American Poets Prize at Ohio State University, and the New Literary Awards Prize. Her poem sequence “The (Dis)enchanted Desna” was a winner of the 2019 New England Poetry Club's Samuel Washington Allen Prize, selected by Robert Pinsky, and her and Kinsella's co-translation from the Ukrainian of Natalka Bilotserkivets's poem sequence "Allergy" was winner of the New England Poetry Club's Diana Der Hovanessian Prize in Translation. More recently, Dzvinia Orlowsky's poem "Our Wagons Were Made Entirely Out of Wood" was selected by Bruce Weigl for the 2022 1st Annual Ampersand Award for Poetry and Prose, sponsored by Pulse & Echo magazine. She is the 2026 recipient of the David Ferry and Ellen LaForge Prize in Poetry and Poetic Translation.

Her work has appeared in numerous journals and magazines including "Agni" "Field" "Los Angeles Review, American Poetry Review as well as anthologies anthologies including Griffin Poetry Prize Anthology (Adam Dickinson, Editor, House of Anasi Press, Inc. 2022); Oxford Anthology of Translation (Oxford University, 2022); Ukrainian-American Poets Respond (Virlana Tkacz, Olena Jennings, Editors, Poets of Queens Press, 2022) The Knowledge: Where Poems Come from and How to Write Them (Dzvid Kirby, Editor, FlipLearning, 2021); Border Lines: Poems of Mirgration (Michaela Moscaliuc, Michale Waters, Editors, Alfred A. Knopf, 2020); Subterranean Fire, Selected Poems by Natalka Bilotserkivets, (Michael Naydan, Editor, Glagoslav Press, 2020); Voices Amidst the Virus: Poets Respond to the Pandemic (Eileen Cleary, Christine Jones, Editors, Lily Poetry Press, 2020); A Cast-Iron Aeroplane That Can Actually Fly: Commentaries from 80 Contemporary American Poets on Their Prose Poetry, (Peter Johnson, Editor, MadHat Press, 2019) Nothing Short of 100: Selected tales from 100 Word Story (Outpost19, 2018) Nasty Women Poets: An Unapologetic Anthology of Subversive Verse (edited by Grace Bauer and Julie Kane, Lost Horse Press, 2017); Plume Anthologies 2-6; The Working Poet: 75 Writing Exercises and a Poetry Anthology (Autumn House Press, 2009); Never Before, Poems about First Experiences (Four Way Books, 2005); Poetry from Sojourner, A Feminist Anthology (University of Illinois Press, 2004); Dorothy Parker’s Elbow (Warner Books, 2002); A Hundred Years of Youth: A Bilingual Anthology of 20th Century Ukrainian Poetry (Lviv, 2000). A Map of Hope: An International Literary Anthology (Rutgers University Press, 1999); and From Three Worlds: New Writing from the Ukraine (Zephyr Press, 1996).

A founding editor (1993-2001) of New York-based Four Way Books, she is also contributing editor to Agni and served as Editor for Poetry in Translation for Solstice: A Magazine of Diverse Voices (2014-2017). She has taught poetry at the Mt. Holyoke Writers' Conference; The Boston Center for Adult Education; Emerson College; Gemini Ink; Keene State College Summer Writers Conference; Stonecoast Summer Writers’ Conference; Stonecoast MFA Program in Creative Writing; Writers in Paradise; the 2005 Solstice Summer Writers’ Conference at Pine Manor College; and as 2012-2013 Visiting Guest Poet and Adjunct Assistant Professor and 2013-2021Special Lecturer, Poetry and Creative Writing at Providence College. She is also founder and director of NIGHT RIFFS: A Solstice Literary Magazine Reading and Music Series. Dzvinia Orlowsky currently serves as Writer-in-Residence of poetry at The Solstice Low-Residency MFA in Creative Writing Program, Lasell University, Newton, Massachusetts. She lives with her husband, Jay Hoffman, in Marshfield, Massachusetts.

== Published works ==
- The Enchanted Desna by Oleksander Dovzhenko co-translated from the Ukrainian by Orlowsky and Kinsella (Lost Horse Press, 2026)
- Those Absences Now Closest (Carnegie Mellon University Press, 2024)
- Lost in Living: Selected Poems by Halyna Kruk co-translated from the Ukrainian by Orlowsky and Kinsella (Lost Horse Press, 2024)
- Eccentric Days of Hope and Sorrow: Selected Poems by Natalka Bilotserkivets co-translated from the Ukrainian by Orlowsky and Kinsella (Lost Horse Press, 2021)
- Bad Harvest (Carnegie Mellon University Press, 2018)
- Memorials: A Selection, by Mieczyslaw Jastrun translated by Orlowsky and Friedman (Dialogos, 2014)
- Silvertone (Carnegie Mellon University Press, 2013)
- A Handful of Bees (Carnegie Mellon University Press Classic Contemporary, 2009)
- Convertible Night, Flurry of Stones (Carnegie Mellon University Press, 2009)
- The Enchanted Desna by Alexander Dovzhenko translated from Ukrainian (House Between Water, 2006)
- Except for One Obscene Brushstroke (Carnegie Mellon University Press, 2004)
- Edge of House (Carnegie Mellon University Press, 1999)
- A Handful of Bees (Carnegie Mellon University Press, 1994)
- The Four Way Reader 2 edited by Carlen Arnett, Jane Brox, Dzvinia Orlowsky, Martha Rhodes (Four Way Books 2001)
- The Four Way Reader 1 edited by Jane Brox, Dzvinia Orlowsky, Martha Rhodes (Four Way Books 1996)
