= Bohdana Neborak =

Ukrainian cultural commentator and journalist

- Born: 1995 (age 30–31)
- Education: University of Lviv
- Parent: Victor Neborak

Bohdana Neborak (born 1995) is a Ukrainian cultural commentator and journalist. She is Editor-in-Chief of the magazine The Ukrainians! and host of the podcast “Наразі без назви”.

== Early life and education ==
Neborak grew up in Lviv. Her father, Viktor Neborak, is a writer. She earned a bachelor's degree in law at the University of Lviv.

== Career ==
She served as Head of Translation at the Ukrainian Book Institute. Here she worked to promote Ukrainian literature internationally. She worked on a programme called Translate Ukraine, which connected publishers and translators to spread Ukrainian art around the world. By the end of 2020, over 50 new translations of Ukrainian books had been created internationally. In 2020 the Kyiv Post named Neborak as one of Ukraine's Top 30 Under 30.

Neborak joined the magazine The Ukrainians!, where she was responsible for the reading section and worked to promote literature. Her first podcast, “Vzyala i Prochytala” (Up and Read), covered violence, hate speech and Ukrainian literature.

Neborak rose to prominence during the Russian invasion of Ukraine. At the start of the invasion she returned to Lviv. She has commented on the significance of historical artists on understanding the Russian invasion of Ukraine. She called for the world to elevate Ukrainian voices over Russian ones, and promoted Ukrainian authors in pop-up bookshops that opened during the Ukrainian blackouts.

Her podcast, “Наразі без назви” (Currently Untitled), was recognised as the best cultural podcast in 2022. The Guardian newspaper described her as one of Ukraine's most hopeful young women of 2023.
