= Tadeusz Śliwiak =

Polish poet

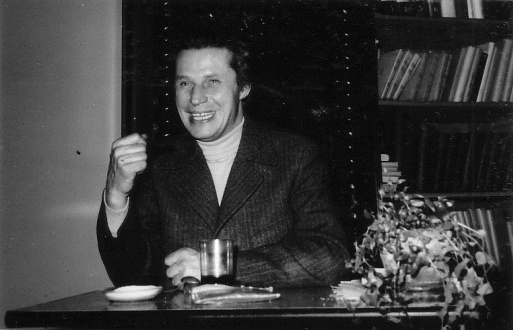
Tadeusz Śliwiak

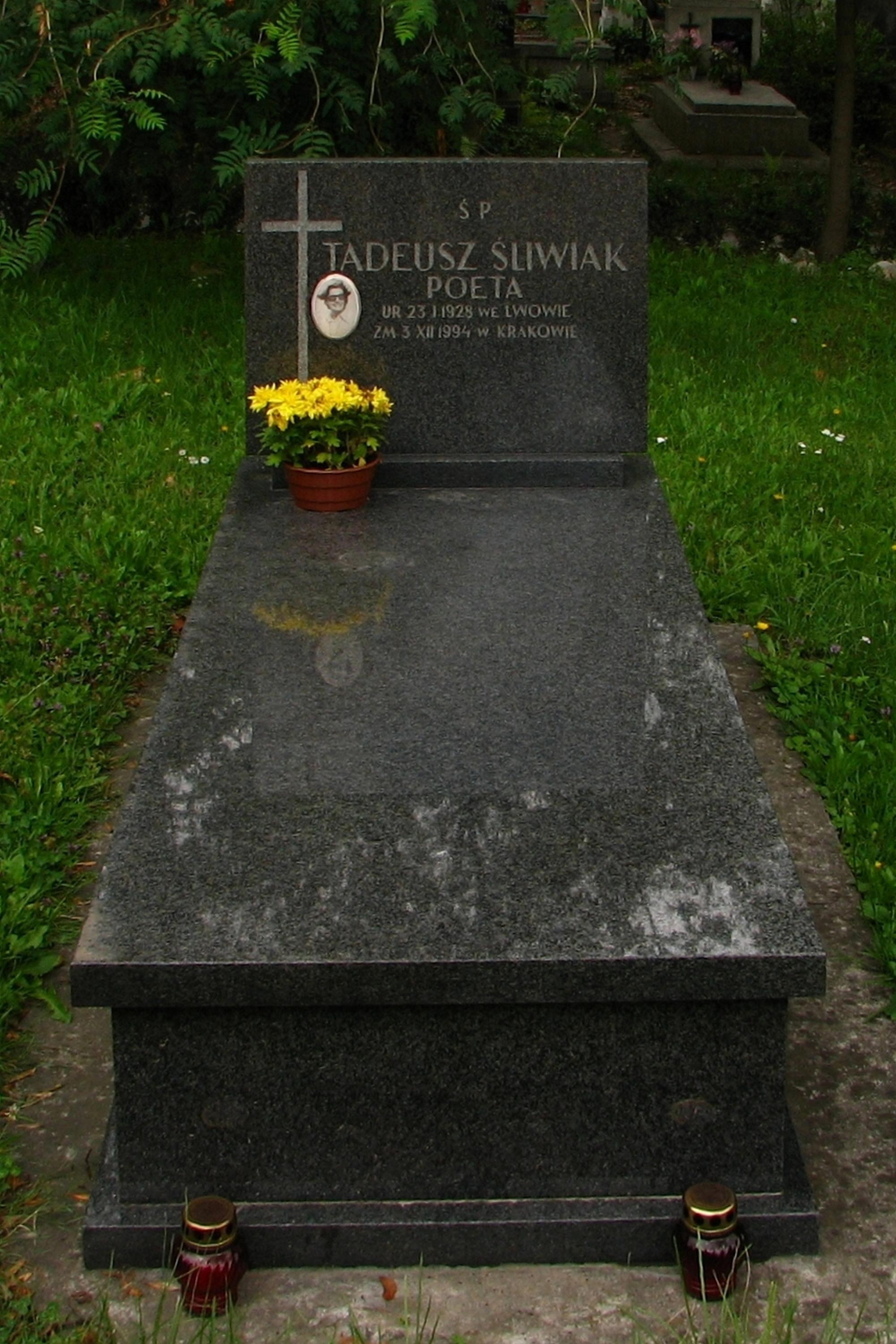
Sliwiak's grave

Tadeusz Śliwiak (23 January 1928 − 3 December 1994) was a Polish poet. He was born in Lviv and died on 3 December 1994 in Kraków.

Śliwiak was the son of Władysław Śliwiak and Anna née Wojtowicz. He spent the years of World War II in Lviv, initially occupied by the USSR and then by Nazi Germany. His father worked as a driver in a Lviv slaughterhouse, which had an impact on his son's sensitivity and creative predispositions. Later in a book, he wrote "A Poem about a Municipal Slaughterhouse"; in 1965.

== Poetry books ==
- Astrolabium z jodłowego drzewa (1953)
- Drogi i ulice (1954)
- Co dzień umiera jeden bóg (1959)
- Koncert na leśnej polanie (1959)
- Imieniny pana Fleta (1961)
- Wyspa galerników (1962)
- Żabki z Rabki (1963)
- Szczygle figle (1964)
- Żywica (1964)
- Poemat o miejskiej rzeźni (1965)
- Lody pana Chmurki (1966)
- Ptasi telewizor (1967)
- Święty wtorek (1968)
- Czytanie mrowiska (1969)
- Ruchoma przystań (1971)
- Widnokres (1971)
- Rajskie wrony (1972)
- Żabi koncert (1973)
- Znaki wyobrażni (1974)
- Totemy (1975)
- Dłużnicy nadziei (1978)
- Solizman (1981)
- Chityna (1982)
- Odmroczenia (1982)
- Słownik wyrazów światłoczułych (1988)
- Dotyk (1989)
