= PEN Ukraine =

Ukrainian branch of PEN International

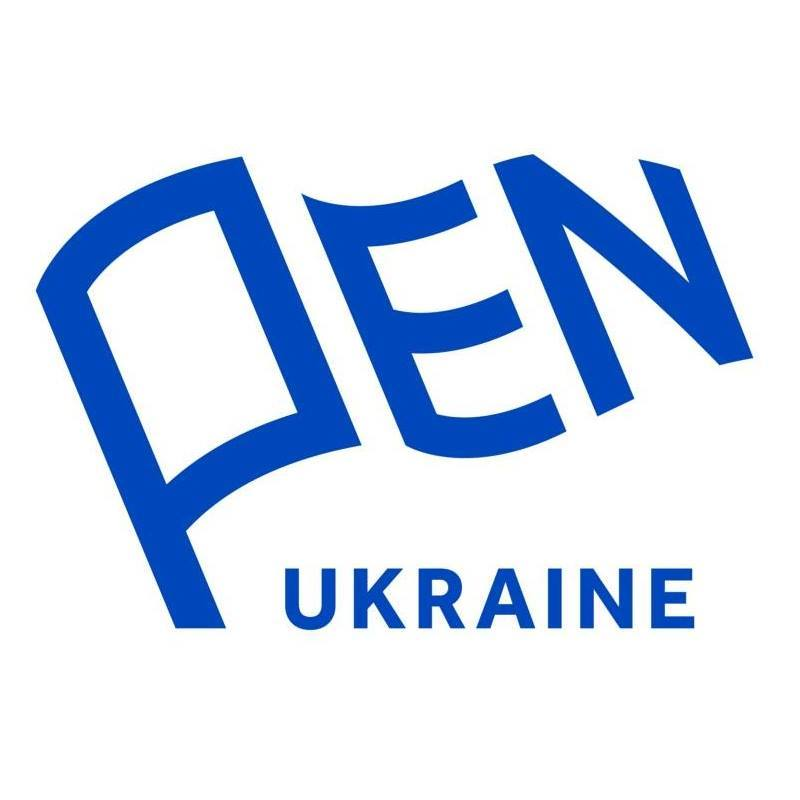
Logo of PEN Ukraine

PEN Ukraine is a Ukrainian non-governmental organization established to protect freedom of speech and authors' rights, promote literature and international cultural cooperation. It is part of the network of national centers of the International PEN.

The Ukrainian Center for International PEN was founded in the fall of 1989, within the Writers' Union of Ukraine. Mykola Vinhranovsky, a Ukrainian poet, was elected the organization's first president.

The main governing body is the General Assembly, which elects an eight-member executive board, headed by a president and two vice presidents.

The abbreviation PEN stands for "poets, playwrights, essayists and novelists", but today PEN Ukraine accept members from outside of literary circles, and the organisation currently has 140 members.

== Structure ==
Today, there are 146 national PEN centers in the world. The headquarters of International PEN, which coordinates and advises other centers, is located in London. The largest PEN center in the world is PEN America, with 7,200 members.

Priorities in the activities of national PEN centers may be determined by the cultural and political situation in a particular country.

Every autumn, the International PEN organizes a PEN Congress in one of the world's countries, which brings together the heads and members of other national PEN centers to re-elect the international leadership and adopt PEN human rights resolutions. In 2017, the International PEN Congress was held for the first time in Ukraine (Lviv). It was in India (Pune) in 2018, in the Philippines (Manila) in 2019, and then online for 2020 and 2021. The congress for 2022 will be held from the 27th of September to the 1st of October in Uppsala, Sweden, with the title "The Power of Words: Future challenges for freedom of expression".

=== Membership ===
Firstly, PEN included only Writers, but the circle of potential members of the organization has expanded. The main criteria for joining the PEN are to share the values of the organization listed in its Charter and to have the desire to promote the development of literature and protect freedom of speech in Ukraine and the world. Currently, the Ukrainian PEN includes 140 members who are writers, human rights activists, translators, Journalists, humanities scholars, publishers, and Cultural managers.

According to the Charter of the Ukrainian PEN, the decision on the admission of new members is made by the Executive Council. Upon the invitation of the executive board, each new member must submit to its consideration two recommendations from other full members of the Ukrainian PEN, as well as a biography and bibliography.

=== Financing ===
Ukrainian PEN is a nonprofit organization that exists through the contributions of its members and the support of individual Donors.

== Management ==
=== Presidents of the Ukrainian PEN ===
- 1989-1993 — Mykola Vinhranovsky
- 1993-2010 — Yevhen Sverstiuk
- 2010-2014 — Myroslav Marynovych
- 2014-2018 — Mykola Riabchuk
- 2018-2022 — Andrey Kurkov
- since 2022 – Volodymyr Yermolenko

=== Vice presidents and Executive Director ===
In August 2018, journalist Tetyana Teren became the executive director of the Ukrainian PEN.

As of October 2019, the members of the executive board of the organization are Olena Styazhkina, Leonid Finberg, Yevhen Zakharov, Larysa Denysenko and Ostap Slyvynsky.

=== Honorary presidents ===
There are currently two honorary presidents, Myroslav Marynovych, human rights activist, journalist, religious scholar, and lecturer, and Mykola Riabchuk, poet, translator, prose writer and essayist.

== Activities ==
The scope of the PEN club's activities is outlined in the Charter of the International PEN (est. 1921). It describes PEN's main tasks as "Protecting freedom of speech and expression, defending minority rights, assisting persecuted writers, supporting cultural diversity, and promoting humanistic values through culture".

Ukrainian PEN has implemented the following projects:

- Participation and presentation of Ukrainian issues at International PEN Congresses: in South Korea (M. Marynovych, 2012) at the 78th Congress; in Kyrgyzstan (A. Kurkov, 2014) at the 80th Congress; in Galicia (M. Ryabchuk, A. Kurkov, G. Bekirova, 2016) at the 82nd Congress; and in Pune (T. Teren, V. Amelina) at the 84th Congress.
- Invitation to Ukraine of the International PEN president John Ralston Saul (Kyiv, Odesa, 2015), of the Department head for International Relations at American PEN Drew Menaker (Kyiv, 2016) and of the International PEN executive director Carles Torner (Lviv, Kyiv, 2017).
- Presentation of Ukrainian issues before the International PEN "Writers in Prison" Committee in Rotterdam, and the "International Cities of Refuge Network" in Lillehammer (Halya Coynash: 2014, 2017, 2019).
- Organization of the 83rd International PEN Congress in Ukraine.
- Annual regional conferences of Eastern European PEN clubs.
- Annual award of Ukrainian PEN's Yurii Shevelyov Prize for modern essays.
- Annual award of Ukrainian PEN's Vasyl Stus Prize.
- Annual award ceremony of the Gongadze Prize for Ukrainian journalists.
- Setting up the PEN Discussion Club. Discussions on topical issues are held at the Club and media projects discussions are implemented.
- Implementation of the "Literary readings in the towns of Ukraine" project.

In 2019, the Ukrainian PEN became a partner of the European Union Literary Prize, gaining the right to form a national jury and decide the prize-winner from Ukraine.

=== PEN Ukraine Translation Fund Grants ===
Ukrainian PEN held a competition to translate Oleg Sentsov's short story book "Life" into English, German and Polish as part of a joint mini-grant program with the International Renaissance Foundation PEN Ukraine Translation Fund Grants, which was announced in October 2018.

The book was translated into English by Dr. Uilleam Blacker (Deep Vellum Publishing). Writer, translator and critic Bohdan Zadura (Warsztaty Kultury) became the translator of the book into Polish.

On 6 December 2018, the Executive Council of the Ukrainian PEN selected the third winner of the competition for the translation of a book of short stories by Oleg Sentsov into German. The winner was the application of a group of translators consisting of Lydia Nagel, Claudia Dathe, Claraia Dathe, Alexander Kratochvil, Thomas Weiler, Andreas Tretner, Christian Körner, Olga Radetzkaja, Jennie Seitz, Irina Bondas and Kati Brunner. The book was published by Voland & Quist.

=== Kharkiv Literary Residence ===
The Kharkiv Literary Residence for Ukrainian Prose Writers was established by the Ukrainian branch of the International PEN Club and the Kharkiv Regional State Administration to support writers as well as promote Kharkiv and its culture in Ukraine and around the world.

Participants of the residency have the opportunity to live in Kharkiv for a month to work on their prose work, as well as to get acquainted with the city.

The participants of the residency today are writers Luba-Paraskevia Strynadyuk, Lyubko Deresh, Michael Zeller (Germany), and translator Yaroslava Strikha.

Several months of literary residencies for Ukrainian prose writers and translators are planned in Kharkiv.

== Human rights projects ==
Since 2014, the Ukrainian PEN has been trying to draw attention to the events in Ukraine, the occupation of Crimea and Ukrainian political prisoners in Russian prisons through a series of statements to the international community. In particular, the following were published:

- Statement on the cessation of escalating violence in Ukraine;
- Protest statement against political repression in Crimea and in defense of Ilma Umerov;
- Open letter to Dutch colleagues on the eve of the local referendum on the Ukraine-EU Association;
- Statement in support of journalist, member of the Ukrainian PEN Stanislav Aseev;
- Joint action of Hromadske.TV and Ukrainian PEN of Oleg Sentsov's story from the collection "Stories" performed by famous Ukrainians (Ada Rogovtseva, Marko Galanevich, Natalia Sumska, Mustafa Nayem, Larisa Denisenko, Igor Kozlovsky, Oleg Mykhalyuta and Nataliia Vorozhbyt).

On 21 August 2018, on the 100th day of the hunger strike of film director and writer Oleg Sentsov, Ukrainian PEN together with the Center for Civil Liberties held a rally "Solidarity with Oleg Sentsov" near the Russian Embassy in Kyiv.

On 15 November 2018, the International Day of Prisoner Writers, the Ukrainian PEN, and the Center for Civil Liberties held an "Empty Chairs" campaign in support of Ukrainian political prisoners in Russia and Crimea, as well as prisoners in the self-proclaimed republics in eastern Ukraine.

== Literary awards ==
=== Vasyl Stus Award ===
The Ukrainian PEN continued the Vasyl Stus Prize, founded in 1989 by the Ukrainian Association of Independent Creative Intelligence (UANTI), headed by Yevhen Sverstyuk, which was awarded annually on 14 January, St. Vasyl's Day.

The Vasyl Stus Prize is awarded annually to Ukrainian PEN authors (writers, artists, directors), regardless of their place of residence, for life, for special contribution to Ukrainian culture and stability of civic position.

The winner of the Vasyl Stus Prize receives a diploma and a distinction from the Ukrainian PEN and a partner of the Prize Kyiv-Mohyla Business School (KMBS).

=== Yurii Shevelov Prize ===
The Yurii Shevelov Prize was established in 2013. Its founders were also the Kyiv-Mohyla Business School, the publishing house "Duh i Litera" and the Harvard Ukrainian Research Institute.

The prize is awarded once a year to a Ukrainian author for artistic and scientific Essays published during the last year. The winner is announced annually during the ceremony on 17 December when it is the birthday of Yurii Shevelyov, who founded modern Ukrainian essays. The winner is awarded a statuette of the Bronze Angel, as well as a cash prize and a diploma.

The winners of the Shevelyov Prize in different years were: Taras Prokhasko, Andrii Portnov, Konstantin Moskalets, Oleksandr Boychenko, Vakhtang Kebuladze, Andriy Lyubka, Volodymyr Yermolenko, Diana Klochko.

=== Georgiy Gongadze Prize ===
The Georgiy Gongadze Prize is awarded once a year on 21 May, on Georgy Gongadze's birthday. This is a new award in the field of journalism in Ukraine founded by the Ukrainian PEN in partnership with the Association of Alumni of the Kyiv-Mohyla Business School and the publication "Ukrayinska Pravda".

The award is created to support those journalists who follow the principles and values of independent journalism, demonstrate professionalism, competence, innovation, create materials that lead to solving or understanding certain problems in society and changes in the country, and make a significant contribution to the media environment. The winner will receive a statuette, a diploma and a prize of $3,000.

The first winner of the Georgiy Gongadze Prize was a journalist, historian, editor-in-chief of the online publication Istorychna Pravda, as well as the founder of the Museum-Archive of the Press Vakhtang Kipiani.

=== Drahomán Prize ===
The Drahomán Prize is a prize for translation from Ukrainian, open to translators from across the world who have at least one published translation of literary or documentary work. The prize was launched in 2020 by PEN Ukraine, the Ukrainian Institute, and the Ukrainian Book Institute.

It is awarded for excellent translation and the international promotion of Ukrainian literature.

The winner of the prize in 2020 was Claudia Dathe from Germany, nominated for her translations of Serhiy Zhadan's collection “Antenna” and Oleksiy Chupa's novel “Fairy Tales of My Bomb Shelter”.

== Members ==
- Borys Gudziak (born 1960), bishop and theological writer
- Mykola Horbal (born 1940), Ukrainian poet, activist, and member of parliament of Ukraine
- Iya Kiva (born 1984), Ukrainian poet, translator, journalist, critic
- Marianna Kiyanovska (born 1973), Ukrainian poet, translator, literary scholar
- Myroslav Marynovych (born 1949), Ukrainian human rights activist, journalist, religious scholar, and lecturer
- Kateryna Mikhalitsyna (born 1982), Ukrainian poet, children's writer, translator, editor
- Alexander J. Motyl (born 1953), Ukrainian-American author
- Volodymyr Rafeienko (born 1969), Ukrainian writer, novelist, and poet
- Mariana Savka (born 1973), Ukrainian poet, children's writer, translator, publisher
- Iryna Shuvalova (born 1986), Ukrainian poet, translator, scholar
- Yevgen Zakharov (born 1952), Ukrainian human rights activist

== See also ==
- European Union Prize for Literature
- 100 Notable Books in Ukrainian, compiled in 2019 by members of PEN Ukraine
