= Larysa Denysenko =

Ukrainian writer, lawyer, human rights activist and TV and radio presenter

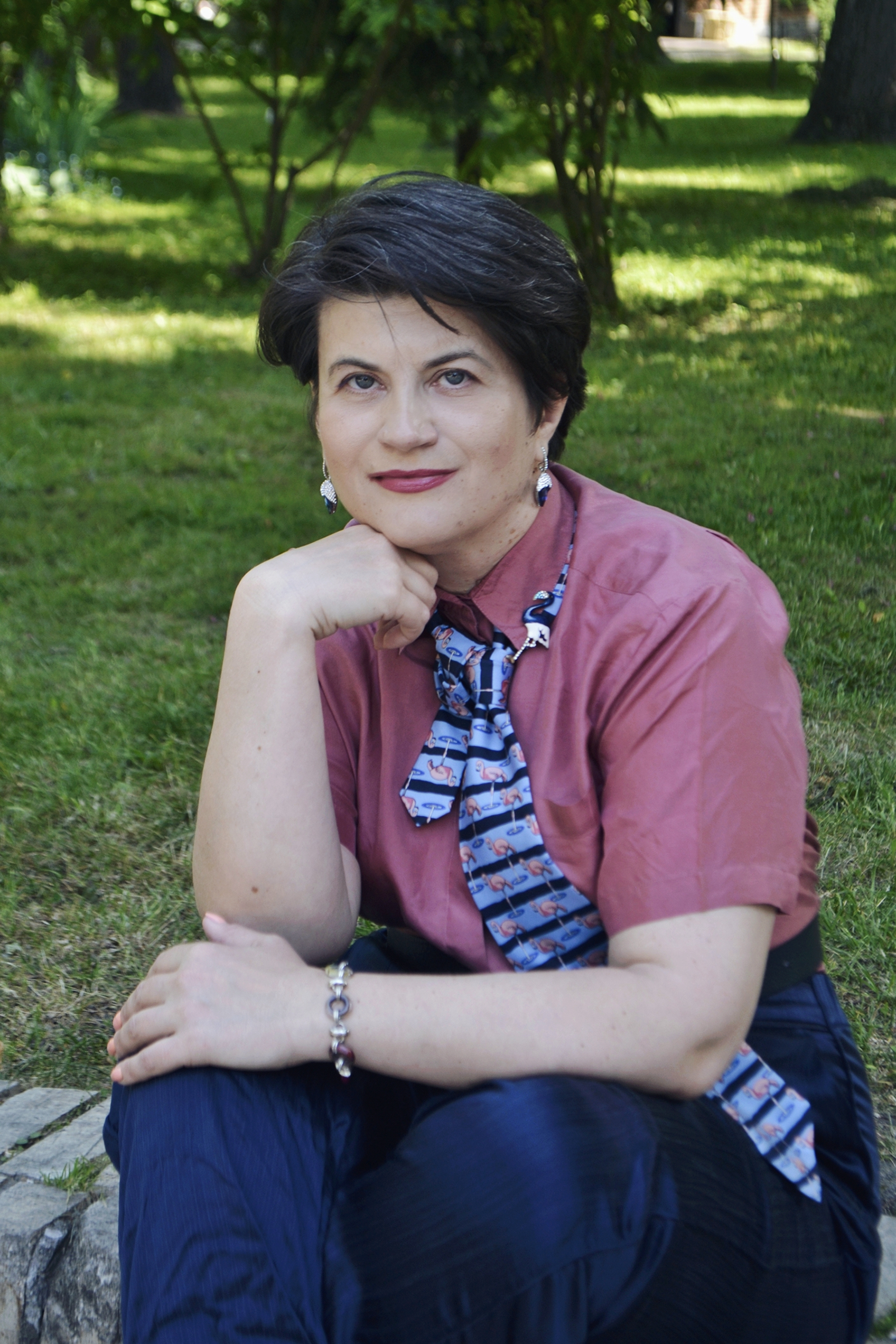
- Larysa Denysenko (May 2023)
- Born: Larysa Volodymyrivna Denysenko; 17 June 1973 (age 53); Kyiv, Ukrainian SSR, Soviet Union
- Occupations: Writer; lawyer; human rights activist; television presenter; radio presenter
- Children: 2

Larysa Volodymyrivna Denysenko (Ukrainian: Лари́са Володи́мирівна Денисе́нко; born 17 June 1973) is a Ukrainian writer, lawyer, human rights activist, TV and radio presenter, and member of the PEN Ukraine.

== Biography ==
Denysenko was born on 17 June in Kyiv. She is of Lithuanian-Greek origin with admixtures of Hungarian, Polish, Romani and Ukrainian blood. She mastered Ukrainian at the age of 23 when she started working at the Ministry of Justice of Ukraine. She graduated from the University of Kyiv, Law faculty, Central European University (Budapest) and attended a law course at the Ministry of Justice and Security.

Denysenko lives in Kyiv. She is in a civil marriage and has two sons. She also collects snails.

== Legal career ==
Denysenko conducts law practice. She is licensed to practice in Toronto and Ottawa on refugee and migrant matters. She is one of the lawyers representing the interests of citizens in the European Court of Human Rights (Strasbourg). She also worked as the director of the international law department of the Ministry of Justice of Ukraine, an adviser to the Minister of Justice, a scientific consultant to parliamentary committees, and headed the national branch of the international anti-corruption organization Transparency International.

== Literary career ==
Denysenko began her literary career by winning the Coronation of the Word competition. The book "Dancing in Masks" took 1st place in the ranking of the best Ukrainian book in the fiction genre of Korrespondent magazine in 2007. She is the author of 10 books (as of 2012). The book about the diversity of human relations in modern Ukraine by Maya and her mother, whose presentation was thwarted by right-wing radical forces, became widely known. After the incident, the author posted a PDF version of the book for free access. In 2019, the book "Me and the Constitution" was published, co-authored by Denysenko. It is a book that explains the Constitution for children in simple language and illustrations.

== Media career ==
Denysenko works for Hromadske Radio. She consistently uses femininities on the radio, during interviews and on television. She is the author and host of the culturological program "Document +" on TV channels "Studio 1+1" and "1+1 International".

== See also ==
- List of Ukrainian literature translated into English
- List of Ukrainian-language writers
- Contemporary Ukrainian literature
