= Ostap Slyvynsky =

Ukrainian poet, essayist, translator, literary critic, and academic

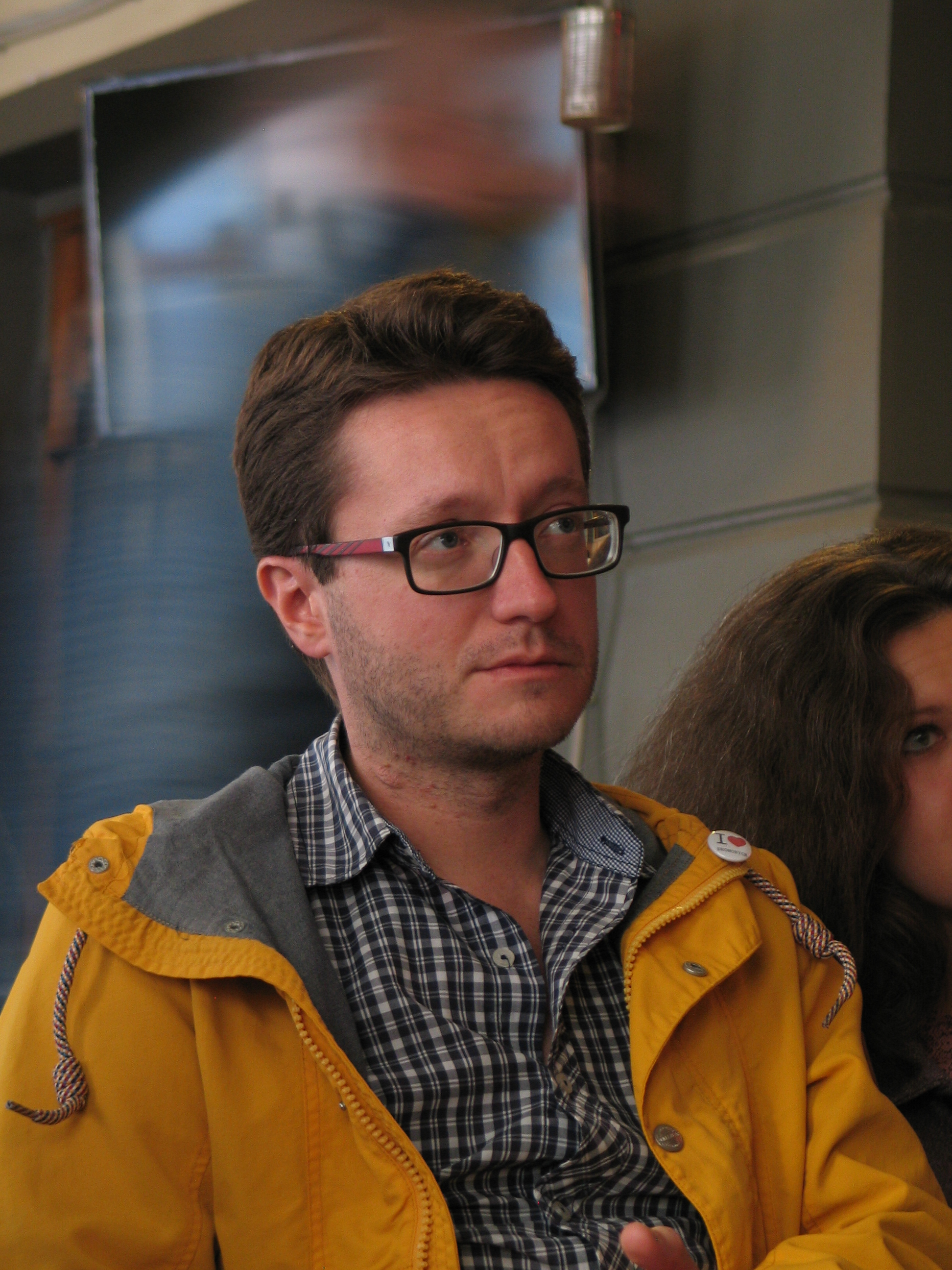
- Born: 14 October 1978; Lviv, Ukraine
- Occupations: poet, essayist, literary critic, translator
- Writing career
- Language: Ukrainian, Polish, English, Bulgarian, Macedonian, Belarusian, and Russian
- Period: 20th-21st century
- Notable works: Sacrifice of the Big Fish; Midday Line; Ball in the Darkness; Adam; The Winter King
- Notable awards: Antonych Literary Prize (1997); Hubert Burda Prize (2009); Kovaliv Fund Prize (2013)

Ostap Slyvynsky (born October 14, 1978) is a Ukrainian poet, essayist, translator, literary critic, and academic. He is the author of several collections of poetry and was a recipient of Ukrainian and international literary awards. He is also noted for translating several works of fiction from other languages into Ukrainian.

== Biography ==
Slyvynsky was born in Lviv, Ukraine. He completed his doctorate degree in 2007 at the Institute of Slav Language and Literature at the University of Lviv. His thesis, The Phenomenon of Silence, analyzed the works of Bulgarian writers from the 1960s to the 1990s.

Aside from writing poetry, Slyvynsky writes for different publications and has worked as an editor of anthologies of current and Belarusian literature. He also edited the literary magazine, Radar. He is a lecturer at the University of Lviv, where he teaches Polish language and literature. He also organized the institution's hosting of the International Literature Festival in the years 2006 and 2007.

Slyvynsky lives in Lviv.

== Works ==
By 2009, Slyvynsky had published four volumes of poetry, which were all translated in eleven languages. His poetic style is described as restless and noted for associations and images as well as reflections on language, history, and politics. Slyvynsky's poetry earned for him the Antonych Literary Prize (1997), the Hubert Burda Prize (2009), and the Kovaliv Fund Prize (2013).

Slyvynsky's translations included books authored by Czesław Miłosz, Hanna Krall, Andrzej Stasiuk, Olga Tokarczuk, Mikołaj Łoziński, Ignacy Karpowicz, Derek Walcott, William Carlos Williams, James Tate, and Georgi Gospodinov. He was recognized by the government of Ukraine for his translation works and also received the Medal of Merit for Polish Culture in 2014.

Together with Bohdan Sehin, Slyvynsky staged a media performance in 2015 called Preparation, which was dedicated to the victims of the war in Donbas.

=== Poetry ===
- Sacrifice of Big Fish, (Lviv, 1998)
- Midday Line, (Khmelnyts'ky-Kyiv, 2004)
- Ball in the Darkness (Kyiv, 2008)
- Driven by Fire (2009)
- Adam, (Chernivtsi, 2012)
- The Winter King, (Lviv, 2018)

=== Translations ===
- Running Fire by Bohdan Zadura, (Wrocław, 2009).
- Sand and Wine by Valéria Juríčková, (Brno, 2015).
- Orpheus by Stanislav Belsky, (Dnipro, 2017)

=== Anthologies ===
- The Frontier: 28 Contemporary Ukrainian Poets. An Anthology, translated by Anatoly Kudryavitsky. London: Glagoslav Publications, 2017. ISBN 978-1-911414-48-3
