= Natalka Bilotserkivets =

Ukrainian poet and translator

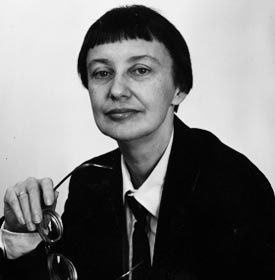
Natalka Bilotserkivets - Ukrainian poet and translator

Natalka Bilotserkivets (born November 8, 1954) is a Ukrainian poet and translator.

She was born in the village of Kuianivka near Sumy and was educated at Kyiv University. She married the critic Mykola Riabchuk and lives in Kyiv. She works as an editor for Ukrainian Culture magazine.

Her first collection of poems, Ballad about the Invincibles (Balada pro neskorenykh), was published in 1976, while she was still in university. She has also published the collections The Underground Fire ( Підземний вогонь) (1984) and November (Листопад) (1989). The collections Allergy (Алергія) (1999) and Central Hotel (Готель Централь) (2004) were the winners of Book of the Month contests in 2000 and 2004 respectively.

Virlana Tkacz and Wanda Phipps started translating Natalka Bilotserkivets's work in 1991 when Yara Arts Group performed a bilingual version of her poem “May” for the event "Fiver Years After," a commemoration of the Chornobyl nuclear accident, presented at the Ukrainian Institute of America in New York. The following winter Virlana used Bilotserkivets's “May” as the core text in Yara's theatre piece "Explosions" presented at La MaMa Experimental Theatre in New York. Tkacz and Phipps were awarded the Poetry Translation Prize by Agni Journal for their translation. Agni also published the poem in 1991.

In 2021, Lost Horse Press published Ali Kinsella and Dzvinia Orlowsky's co-translations from the Ukrainian of a selection of Bilotserkivets's poems Eccentric Days of Hope and Sorrow which was a finalist for the 2022 Griffin International Poetry Prize, the Derek Walcott Prize for Poetry, ALTA's National Translation Award in Poetry, and winner of the 2022 American Association for Ukrainian Studies 2020-2021 Translation Prize.

In 2022, Glagoslav Publications published Subterranean Fire, a selection of her poetry translated by James Brasfield with other translators.

== See also ==
- List of Ukrainian-language poets
- List of Ukrainian women writers
- List of Ukrainian literature translated into English
