= Iryna Shuvalova =

Ukrainian poet, translator and scholar

- Ірина Шувалова
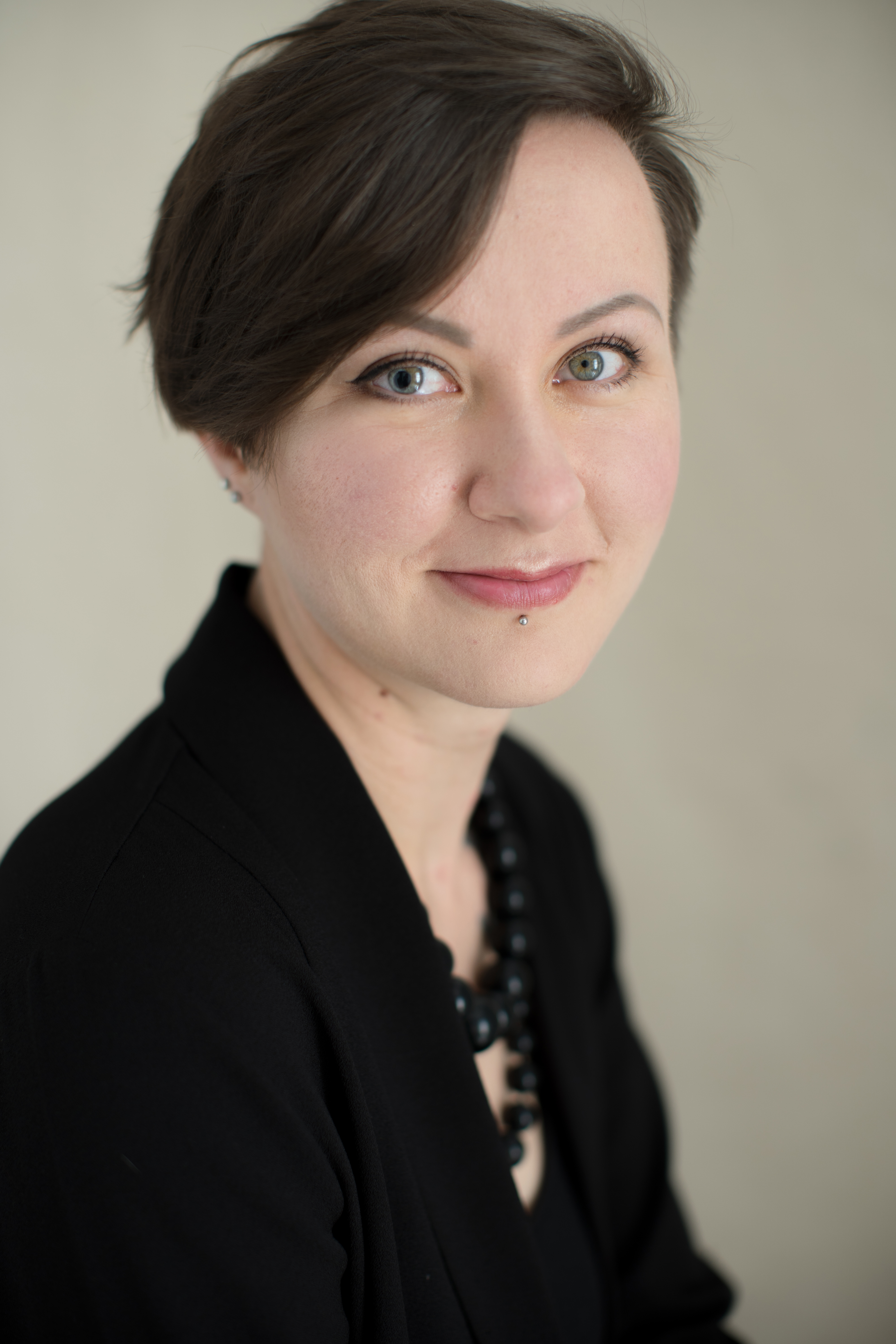
- Iryna Shuvalova (2018)
- Born: 1986 (age 39–40); Kyiv
- Education: Dartmouth College
- Occupations: Writer, Translator, Scholar

Iryna Leonidivna Shuvalova (Ukrainian: Ірина Леонідівна Шувалова; born 1986) is a Ukrainian poet, translator and scholar.

== Early life and education ==
Iryna Shuvalova was born in 1986 in Kyiv. She studied at the Taras Shevchenko National University of Kyiv. In 2014, she completed MA in Comparative literature at Dartmouth College, followed by a PhD in 2020 in Slavonic studies at the University of Cambridge on the topic of songs of the Russo-Ukrainian War created by affected local communities. At Dartmouth she was a recipient of a Fulbright scholarship, while at Cambridge she gained a Gates Cambridge Scholarship and taught Ukrainian.

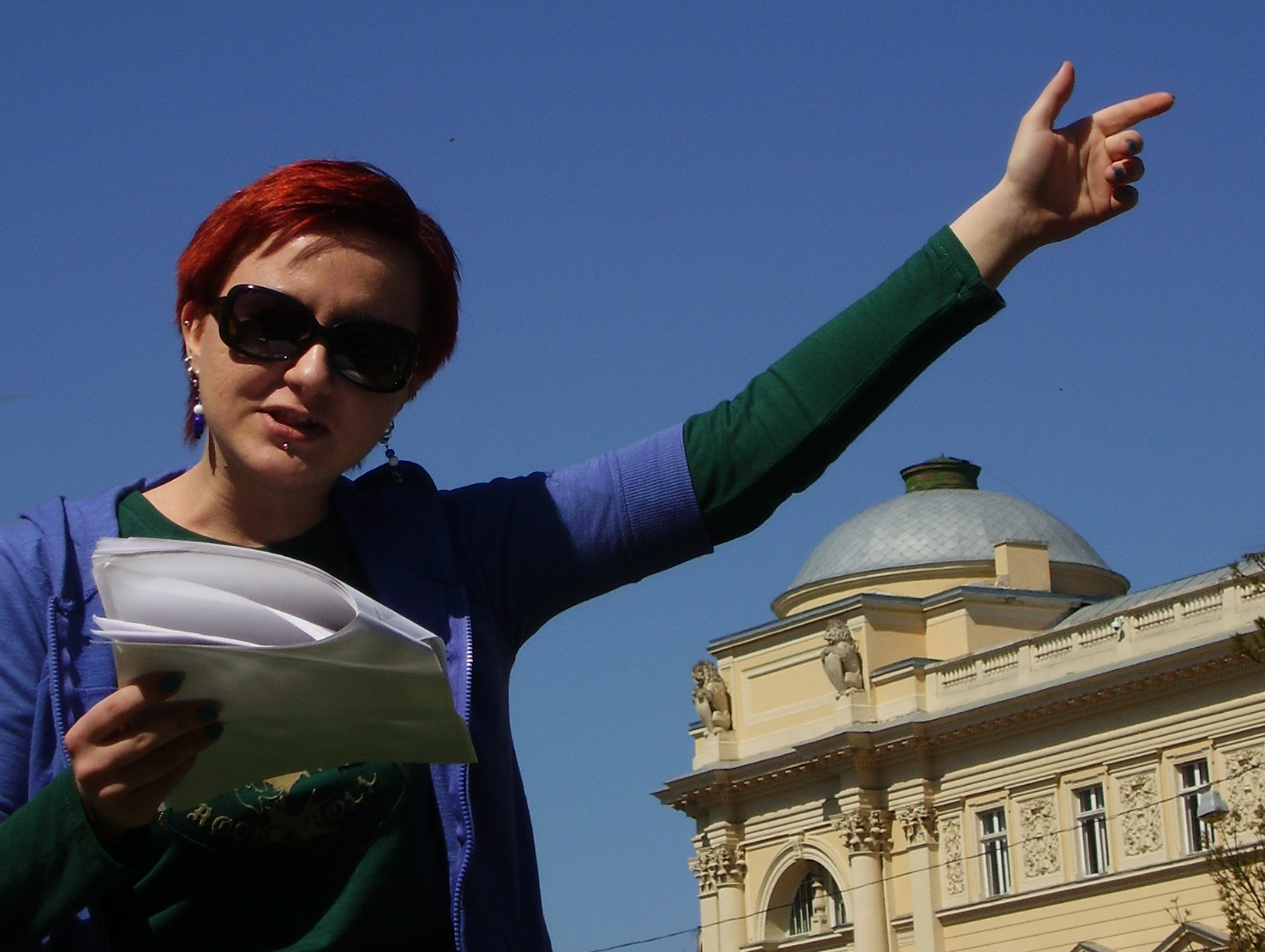
Iryna Shuvalova reads her poetry near Lviv National University during the Woman 3000 project tour (March 2010)

== Career ==
Shuvalova debuted in 2011 with her poetry book Ran. Her fourth book, the bilingual publication Pray to the Empty Wells was strongly influenced by Ukrainian folk culture and nature. Her poems have appeared in various anthologies and have been translated into nine languages. In 2019, she was a coeditor of 120 pages of "Sodom": the first anthology of queer literature published in Ukraine.

She works as a translator from English into Ukrainian and from Ukrainian and Russian into English. Shuvalova has translated, among others, Life of Pi by Yann Martel (2016) and Milk and Honey by Rupi Kaur (2019). Her translations into English have appeared in Modern Poetry in Translation and Words Without Borders.

Shuvalova has received a number of awards for her own work as well as translation, including the first prize in the Smoloskyp Literary Competition in 2010 and the Joseph Brodsky/Stephen Spender Prize for translating Sergei Chegra's poem The Prayer of the Touch.

Shuvalova is a member of PEN Ukraine and in 2017 became an expert on Ukrainian translations for the English PEN.

== Publications ==
- Ran
- Os
- Az
- Pray to the Empty Wells - bilingual publication
- Stoneorchardwoods
