= Oksana Lutsyshyna =

Ukrainian poet and writer (born 1974)

Oksana Lutsyshyna Shevchenko National Prize laureate
- Окса́на Луци́шина
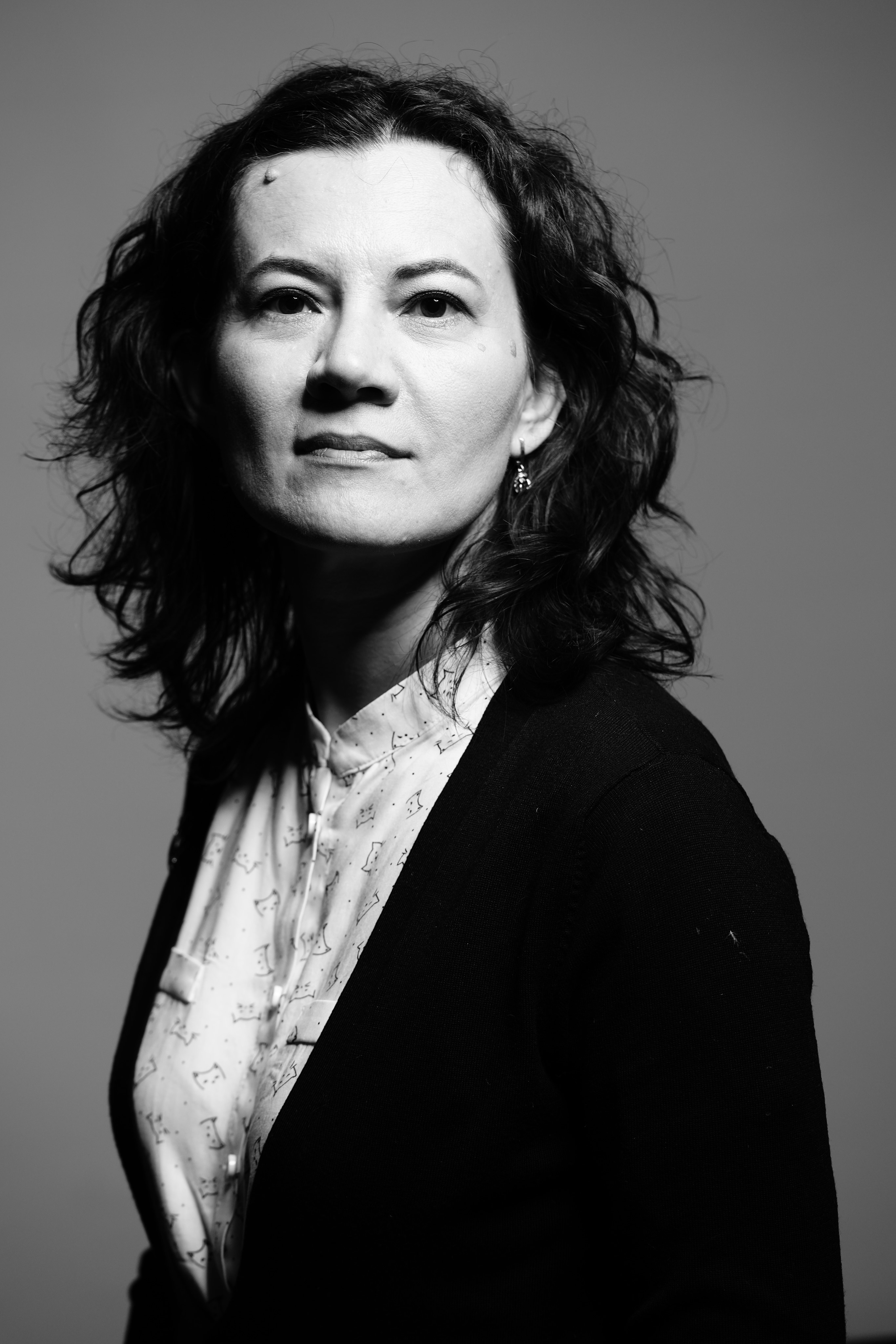
- Born: Oksana Petrivna Kishko; 10 October 1974 (age 51); Uzhhorod, Ukrainian SSR, Soviet Union (now Ukraine)
- Education: Uzhhorod National University; University of South Florida (MA); University of Georgia (PhD)
- Occupations: Poet; writer; professor
- Organization: Assistant professor at the University of Texas
- Awards: see here

Oksana Petrivna Lutsyshyna (Note: Ukrainian: Окса́на Петрі́вна Луци́шина) (née Kishko; born 10 October 1974) is a Ukrainian poet and writer who is a recipient of the Shevchenko National Prize, and member of PEN Ukraine. She primarily writes poetry and fiction in Ukrainian.

== Early life and education ==
Born on 10 October 1974, in the Ukrainian city of Uzhhorod. Lutsyshyna received her degree in 1995 from Uzhhorod National University's Faculty of Romano-Germanic Philology. Lutsyshyna received training at Kansas University in the United States from 1993 to 1994. Following her graduation, she worked as a teaching assistant in the Department of Foreign Languages at the Uzhhorod State Institute of Economics, Informatics and Law (1998–2001) and as an assistant in the Department of English at Uzhhorod National University (1995–1998).

== Career ==
The most prominent literary honors in Ukraine were given to Lutsyshyna's most recent book, Ivan and Phoebe (2019), in 2020 and 2021, respectively: the Taras Shevchenko National Prize in Fiction and the Lviv UNESCO City of Literature Prize. Deep Vellum Publishing published Nina Murray's English translation of the book in 2023. The English translation of her poetry book Persephone Blues was published by Arrowsmith in 2019. HURI Books will soon release the English translation of the author's second book, Love Life (novel). Along with Olena Jennings, she also does English translations of Ukrainian writers. Her original poems and translations are included inside the Words for War collection, an anthology of English-language Ukrainian poetry that responds to the continuing conflict in the Donbas region of eastern Ukraine.

== Works ==
Lutsyshyna's original writing has been published in Ukraine and consists of two novels, a collection of short tales, and three poetry collections. One of her books has been nominated for a Ukrainian BBC prize on the long list. She has written and published the following poetry and novels:

- Without Blushing (2007)
- The Sun Seldom Sets (2007)
- I Am Listening to the Song of America (2010)
- Love Life (2015)
- Felicity's Poems (2018)
- Ivan and Phoebe (2019)
- Persephone Blues (2019)

== Awards and recognitions ==
Lutsyshyna has received awards and recognitions such as:

- Shevchenko National Prize (2021)
- The Lviv – UNESCO City of Literature Award (2020)
- Fulbright Award (2012)
- Kovalevy Fund Award (2011)
- Blahovist Poetry Award (1998)
- Hranoslov Poetry Award (1996)

=== English editions and translations ===
- Persephone Blues, poetry (Arrowsmith, 2019), translated selections.
- Ivan and Phoebe (Deep Vellum, 2023), trans. Nina Murray, ISBN 978-1646052622.
- Love Life (HURI Books/Harvard Library of Ukrainian Literature, 2024), trans. Nina Murray, ISBN 978-0674297159 (pbk); 978-0674297166 (hc).
