= 100 Notable Books in Ukrainian =

The list of the 100 Notable Books in Ukrainian 'From Skovoroda to the Present Day' was compiled in 2019 by members of PEN Ukraine and the online magazine The Ukrainians to show the abundance and genre variety of Ukrainian literature and draw attention to significant works which, due to certain reasons, were forgotten or little known.

All works are characterised by a particular authorial style, offer new ideas and meanings and influence the development of the Ukrainian language and the formation of Ukraine. The list includes works in Ukrainian written between the 18th and 21st centuries. The list includes poetry, prose, drama, essays and memoirs, but excludes academic editions. A work is a novel, story, novella, short story, poem, as well as collections of stories, novels and poems, established by an author as one complete work. Each author is represented on the list with only one work.

The authors of the list emphasise that this list is not a canon of Ukrainian literature, as it does not represent a large and important layer of ancient literature, as well as works in other languages, which are an important part of Ukrainian literature.

The list is sorted alphabetically by the author's surname in Ukrainian.

== List ==
| No. | Author | Title | Year | Translation |
|---|---|---|---|---|
| 1 | Emma Andijewska | A Novel about Human Destiny / Роман про людське призначення | 1982 | |
| 2 | Sofia Andrukhovych | Felix Austria / Фелікс Австрія | 2014 | Felix Austria (2024) Harvard University Press, ISBN 978-0-674-29142-3. |
| 3 | Yurii Andrukhovych | Perverzion / Перверзія | 1996 | Perversion (2005) Transl. by Michael M. Naydan, Northwestern University Press, ISBN 978-0-8101-1964-2 |
| 4 | Borys Antonenko-Davydovych | Siberian novellas / Сибірські новели | 1989 | |
| 5 | Bohdan Ihor Antonych | The Green Gospel / Зелена Євангелія | 1938 | |
| 6 | Ivan Bahrianyi | Garden of Gethsemane / Сад Гетсиманський | 1950 | |
| 7 | Mykola Bazhan | Karby / Карби | 1978 | |
| 8 | Vasyl Barka | The Yellow Prince / Жовтий князь | 1963 | |
| 9 | Ivan Bilyk and Panas Myrnyi | Do Oxen Low When Mangers are Full? / Хіба ревуть воли, як ясла повні? | 1880 | Do Oxen Low When Mangers Are Full? (1990) Transl. by Oles Kovalenko, Dnipro publishers, ISBN 5-308-00763-2 |
| 10 | Natalka Bilotserkivets | Central Hotel / Готель Централь | 2004 | |
| 11 | Volodymyr Vynnychenko | Notes of a Pug-Nosed Mephistopheles / Записки кирпатого Мефістофеля | 1917 | |
| 12 | Yuriy Vynnychuk | Tango of Death / Танґо смерті | 2012 | Tango of Death (2019) Transl. by Michael M. Naydan and Olha Tytarenko. Spuyten Duyvil, ISBN 978-1-949966-33-6 |
| 13 | Ostap Vyshnya | The Hunter's Smiles / Мисливські усмішки | 1956 | |
| 14 | Iryna Vilde | The Richynski Sisters / Сестри Річинські | 1964 | |
| 15 | Mykola Vinhranovskyi | A Hundred Poems / Сто поезій | 1967 | |
| 16 | Marko Vovchok | Instytutka / Інститутка | 1862 | After Finishing School (1983) Transl. by Oles Kovalenko. Dnipro Publishers, 1983 |
| 17 | Mykola Vorobyov | Without Bark / Без кори | 1967 | |
| 18 | Vasyl Herasumiuk | Children of Thrills / Діти трепети | 1991 | |
| 19 | Vasyl Holoborodko | Flying Window / Летюче віконце | 1970 | |
| 20 | Ivan Dziuba | Reminiscences and Deliberations at the Finish Line / Спогади і роздуми на фінішній прямій | 2008 | |
| 21 | Alexander Dovzhenko | The Enchanted Desna / Зачарована Десна | 1956 | |
| 22 | V. Domontovych | Doctor Seraficus / Доктор Серафікус | 1947 | |
| 23 | Mykhailo Drai-Khmara | Sprout / Проростень | 1926 | |
| 24 | Ivan Drach | Weekday Ballades / Балади буднів | 1967 | |
| 25 | Oksana Zabuzhko | Fieldwork in Ukrainian Sex / Польові дослідження з українського сексу | 1996 | Fieldwork in Ukrainian Sex (2011) Transl. by Halyna Hryn, AmazonCrossing, ISBN 978-1-61109-008-6 |
| 26 | Pavlo Zahrebelnyi | Wonder / Дивo | 1968 | |
| 27 | Mykola Zerov | Kamena / Камена | 1924 | |
| 28 | Roman Ivanychuk | Mallows / Мальви | 1968 | |
| 29 | Yuriy Izdryk | Wozzeck / Воццек & воццекургія | 1997 | |
| 30 | Serhiy Zhadan | Voroshilovgrad / Ворошиловград | 2010 | Voroshilovgrad (2016) Transl. by Isaac Stackhouse Wheeler and Reilly Costigan-Humes, Deep Velum, ISBN 978-1-941920-30-5 |
| 31 | Iryna Zhylenko | Gospel of the Swallow / Євангеліє від ластівки | 2006 | |
| 32 | Maik Yohansen | Dr. Leonardo's Journey to Sloboda Switzerland with his Future Lover, the Beautiful Alcesta / Подорож ученого доктора Леонардо і його майбутньої коханки прекрасної Альчести у Слобожанську Швайцарію | 1932 | The Journey of the Learned Doctor Leonardo and His Future Lover, the Beauteous Alceste, to the Switzerland of Slobozhanshchyna (2021) Transl. by Svitlana Yakovenko. Sova Books. ISBN 978-0-6489485-2-0 Dr. Leonardo's Journey to Sloboda Switzerland with His Future Lover, the Beautiful Alcesta (2025) Transl. by Uilleam Blacker, Harvard Ukrainian Research Institute, ISBN 978-0-674-29195-9 |
| 33 | Ihor Kalynets | The Awakened Muse. The Muse of Captives / Пробуджена муза. Невольнича муза | 1991 | |
| 34 | Ivan Karpenko-Karyi | The Ill-Fated One / Безталанна | 1884 | |
| 35 | Hryhorii Kvitka-Osnovianenko | The Witch of Konotop / Конотопська відьма | 1833 | The Witch of Konotop (2023) Transl. by Michael M. Naydan Alla Perminova, GLAGOSLAV PUBLICATIONS B.V., ISBN 978-1-80484-117-4 |
| 36 | Leonid Kyseliov | You Live Only Twice .../ Тільки двічі живемо... | 1991 | |
| 37 | Marianna Kiyanovska | The Voices of Babyn Yar / Бабин Яр. Голосами | 2017 | The Voices of Babyn Yar (2022) Transl. by Oksana Maksymchuk and Max Rosochinsky, ISBN 978-0-674-26876-0 |
| 38 | Olha Kobylianska | Valse mélancholique / Меланхолі́йний ва́льс | 1898 | |
| 39 | Vasyl Kozhelianko | Defilade in Moscow / Дефіляда в Москві | 1997 | |
| 40 | Yuri Kosach | Aeneas and Life of Others / Еней і життя інших | 1946 | |
| 41 | Lina Kostenko | Over the Banks of the Eternal River / Над берегами вічної ріки | 1977 | |
| 42 | Ivan Kotliarevskyi | Eneida / Енеїда | 1842 | Aeneid (2004) Transl. by Bohdan Melnyk, The Basilian Press, ISBN 978-0-921537-66-3. |
| 43 | Mykhailyna Kotsiubynska | Book of Memories / Книга споминів | 2014 | |
| 44 | Mykhailo Kotsiubynsky | Shadows of Forgotten Ancestors / Тіні забутих предків | 1911 | Shadows of Forgotten Ancestors (1981) Transl. by Marco Carynnyk. Ukrainian Academic Press. ISBN 0-87287-205-X |
| 45 | Ahatanhel Krymsky | Andriy Lahovskyi / Андрій Лаговський | 1905 | |
| 46 | Mykola Kulish | Myna Mazailo / Мина Мазайло | 1929 | |
| 47 | Panteleimon Kulish | Black Council / Чорна рада | 1857 | |
| 48 | Oleh Lysheha | Friend Li Po, Brother Tu Fu. / Друже Лі Бо, брате Ду Фу | 2010 | |
| 49 | George S. N. Luckyj | Years of hopes and Losses / Роки сподівань і втрат | 2004 | |
| 50 | Arkadiy Liubchenko | Diary / Щоденник | 1945 | |
| 51 | Yevhen Malaniuk | Book of Observations / Книга спостережень | 1966 | |
| 52 | Ivan Malkovych | All is Near / Все поруч | 2010 | |
| 53 | Tanya Malyarchuk | From Top to Bottom / Згори вниз | 2006 | |
| 54 | Myroslav Marynovych | The Universe behind Barbed Wire: Memoirs of a Ukrainian Soviet Dissident / Всесвіт за колючим дротом | 2016 | The Universe behind Barbed Wire: Memoirs of a Ukrainian Soviet Dissident (2021) Transl. by Zoya Hayuk. University of Rochester Press. ISBN 978-1-58046-981-4 |
| 55 | Maria Matios | Sweet Darusia / Солодка Даруся | 2004 | |
| 56 | Taras Melnychuk | Knight of Dew / Князь роси | 1990 | |
| 57 | Attyla Mohylnyi | Kyiv Contours / Київські контури | 2013 | |
| 58 | Kostiantyn Moskalets | A Man on the Ice Floe / Людина на крижині | 1999 | |
| 59 | Viktor Neborak | Flying Head / Літаюча голова | 2005 | |
| 60 | Vsevolod Nestayko | Toreadors from Vasiukivka / Тореадори з Васюківки | 1973 | |
| 61 | Ivan Nechuy-Levytsky | Kaidash's Family / Кайдашева сім'я | 1879 | |
| 62 | Oleksandr Oles | Joy Embraced the Sorrow / З журбою радість обнялась | 1906 | |
| 63 | Oleh Olzhych | Near the Castle / Підзамче | 1946 | |
| 64 | Todos Osmachka | The Elder Boyar / Старший боярин | 1946 | |
| 65 | Valerian Pidmohylny | The City / Місто | 1928 | The City, translated with introduction by Maxim Tarnawsky. Harvard University Press, Harvard Library of Ukrainian Literature, 2024, ISBN 978-0-674-29111-9. |
| 66 | Yevhen Pluzhnyk | Three Collections / Три збірки | 1979 | |
| 67 | Leonid Plyushch | History's Carnival: a Dissident's Autobiography / У карнавалі історії | 1979 | History's Carnival: a Dissident's Autobiography (1980), HarperCollins, ISBN 978-0-00-262116-8 |
| 68 | Les Podervianskyi | Pavlik Morozov / Павлік Морозов | 2005 | |
| 69 | Yurko Pozaiak | Masterpieces / Шедеври | 1997 | |
| 70 | Taras Prokhasko | The UnSimple / НепрОсті | 2002 | The UnSimple Transl. by Uilleam Blacker |
| 71 | Maksym Rylsky | Under the Autumn Stars / Під осінніми зорями | 1918 | |
| 72 | Ihor Rymaruk | Diva Obyda / Діва Обида | 2000 | |
| 73 | Bohdan Rubchak | Myths of Metamorphoses, or Search for a Good World / Міти метаморфоз, або Пошуки доброго світу | 2012 | |
| 74 | Stepan Rudansky | Singing Rhymes / Співомовки | 1921 | |
| 75 | Mykola Riabchuk | Dilemma of Ukrainian Faust: Civil Society and "Statebuilding" / Дилема українського Фауста: громадянське суспільство і «розбудова держави» | 2000 | |
| 76 | Ulas Samchuk | Maria / Марія | 1934 | Maria: A Chronicle of Life. (2011) Transl. by Roma Franko. Language Lanterns Publications. ISBN 978-0-9877750-0-9 |
| 77 | Yevhen Sverstiuk | Ukraine's Prodigal Sons / Блудні сини України | 1993 | |
| 78 | Volodymyr Svidzinskyi | Harvesting Honey / Медобір | 1975 | |
| 79 | Ivan Svitlychnyi | I Have Only Words / У мене тільки слово | 1994 | |
| 80 | Mykhail Semenko | Kobzar / Кобзар | 1924 | |
| 81 | Hryhorii Skovoroda | The Garden of Divine Songs / Сад божественних пісень | 1861 | The Garden of Divine Songs and Collected Poetry of Hryhory Skovoroda (2016) Transl. by Michael M. Naydan, Glagoslav Publications B.V., ISBN 978-1-911414-04-9 |
| 82 | Vadym Skurativskiy | History and Culture / Історія та культура | 1996 | |
| 83 | Volodymyr Sosiura | The Third Company / Третя Рота | 1988 | |
| 84 | Mykhailo Starytsky | Chasing Two Hares / За двома зайцями | 1883 | |
| 85 | Vasyl Stefanyk | Blue Book / Синя книжечка | 1899 | |
| 86 | Vasyl Stus | Palimpsests / Палімпсести | 1986 | |
| 87 | Pavlo Tychyna | Clarinets of the Sun / Сонячні кларнети | 1918 | The Complete Early Poetry Collections (2016) Transl. by Michael M. Naydan, Glagoslav Publications, ISBN 978-1-911414-20-9 |
| 88 | Hryhir Tiutiunnyk | Three Gowks with a Bow / Три зозулі з поклоном | 1976 | |
| 89 | Hryhoriy Tiutiunnyk | Vortex / Вир | 1960 | |
| 90 | Lesya Ukrainka | The Forest Song / Лісова пісня | 1911 | The Forest Song: A Fairy Play (2025) Transl. by Virlana Tkacz and Wanda Phipps, Harvard University Press, ISBN 978-0-674-29188-1 |
| 91 | Oles Ulianenko | Stalinka / Сталінка | 1994 | Stalinka Part I, Stalinka Part II Transl. by Olha Rudakevych |
| 92 | Ivan Franko | Moses / Мойсей | 1905 | Moses Transl. Vera Rich |
| 93 | Mykola Khvyliovyi | I (Romance) / Я (Романтика) | 1924 | |
| 94 | Hnat Khotkevych | Stone Soul / Камінна душа | 1911 | |
| 95 | Hrytsko Chubai | Pentateuch / П'ятикнижжя | 2013 | |
| 96 | Taras Shevchenko | Kobzar / Кобзар | 1840 | Kobzar (2013) Transl. by Peter Fedynska, Glagoslav Publications, ISBN 978-1-909156-54-8 |
| 97 | Valeriy Shevchuk | House on a Hill / Дім на горі | 1983 | |
| 98 | George Shevelov | I – Myself – Me (and surroundings) / Я – менe – мені (і довкруги) | 1987 | |
| 99 | Geo Shkurupii | Door in Daytime / Двері в день | 1929 | |
| 100 | Yuri Yanovskyi | Master of the Ship / Майстер корабля | 1928 | |
