= Stepan Protsiuk =

Ukrainian writer

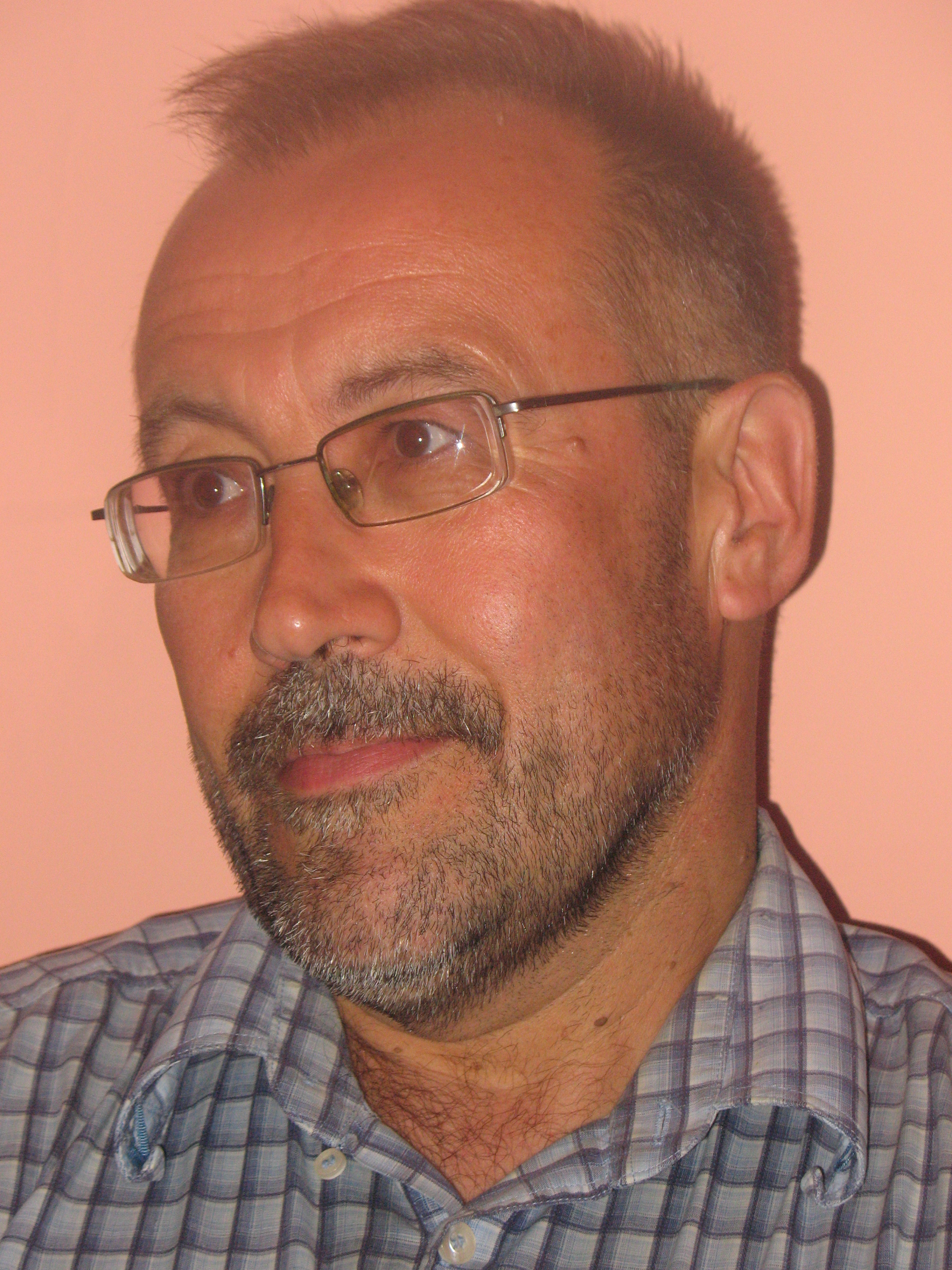
- Born: 13 August 1964 (age 62); Kuty, Lviv Oblast, Ukrainian SSR
- Occupations: Novelist, essayist
- Writing career
- Genre: Ukrainian literature
- Notable works: Infection (2002), Pan (2024)
- Notable awards: Merited Art Worker of Ukraine (2026)

Stepan Vasylovych Protsiuk (Ukrainian: Степа́н Васи́льович Процю́к; born 13 August 1964 in Kuty, Lviv Oblast) is a contemporary Ukrainian novelist, essayist and poet. The author of more than 30 books, he is known above all for his psychological prose and for a cycle of fictionalised biographies of Ukrainian writers and public figures. In 2026 he received the honorary title of Merited Art Worker of Ukraine.

== Biography ==
Stepan Protsiuk was born on 13 August 1964 in small village Kuty in Lviv Oblast of Ukrainian SSR. His parents were school teachers, and his father was a political prisoner who was sentenced for anti-Soviet propaganda before Stepan's birth. Shortly after his birth, Protsiuk's parents moved to Ivano-Frankivsk Oblast.

Stepan Protsiuk studied in Vasyl Stefanyk Precarpathian National University and obtained a PhD (Candidate of Sciences) degree in philology in the Institute of Literature of National Academy of Sciences of Ukraine. Since the early 1990s, he has been living in Ivano-Frankivsk; he taught Ukrainian literature at the Precarpathian National University alongside his writing career until 2020.

Stepan Protsiuk is a member the Ukrainian center of PEN International. Protsiuk was a member of National Writers' Union of Ukraine since 1995 until he quit the organization in 2017, claiming that he had "different views on the development of the Ukrainian literature".

Protsiuk is married, he is a father to two sons. He currently lives in Ivano-Frankivsk.

== Literary works ==
Stepan Protsiuk started his literary career as a poet in the early 1990s. Along with Ivan Tsyperdiuk and Ivan Andrusiak, he founded poetic group New Degeneration, which was among the most famous Ukrainian poetic groups in the early 1990s. New Degeneration created a controversy among prominent Ukrainian writers and literary critics as, for example, Oles Honchar criticized the group's approach to literature, while Lina Kostenko praised it. In 1992, the group published their first book New Degeneration (foreword by Yurii Andrukhovych), which included Protsiuk's collection of poems titled At the Edge of Two Truths. New Degeneration was active until the mid-1990s.

In the late 1990s, Stepan Protsiuk stopped writing poetry and gradually switched to prose works. His first novel Infection, which is one of his most famous works, was published in 2002 and devoted to social and psychological issues, being set in 20th-century Ukraine. Protsiuk received both praise and criticism for his depiction of national and mental problems of Ukrainians.

In his works, Protsiuk explores various social problems facing Ukraine today (Infection) or in the past (Tenth Line, The Grass Cannot Die), as well as existential problems, such as individual and collective being (Destruction of a Doll) or relationship between parents and children (Hit Your Head against the Wall). His literary style has been described as a mix of postmodernism and neo avant-garde.

In the late 2000s, Protsiuk debuted with his novels for children. First novel, Mariyka and Kostyk, was followed by two sequels, In Love with the Sun and Argonauts. All of them were published in Kyiv-based publishing house Grani-T. Protsiuk also authored three books for children published in Vinnytsia-based publishing house Teza.

Protsiuk is also known for what he calls his psychobiographical novels, devoted to prominent figures of Ukrainian culture. The cycle began with books on the writers Vasyl Stefanyk (The Rose of Ritual Pain), Volodymyr Vynnychenko (Masks Fall off Slowly) and Arkhyp Teslenko (Black Apple). It was continued by Hands and Tears (2022), about Ivan Franko, and Moon, Moon (2023), about Hryhir Tiutiunnyk; the latter was finished in early 2022 but its publication was delayed by the full-scale Russian invasion.

In 2024, Protsiuk published Pan, a novel about the entrepreneur, publisher and philanthropist Yevhen Chykalenko, which became his most decorated book. Since 2019 he has also run a YouTube channel, A Writer about Writers (Ukrainian: Письменник про письменників), devoted to the lives and works of 19th- and 20th-century Ukrainian authors; a book of essays under the same title appeared in 2024.

Protsiuk's major books include:

- At the Edge of Two Truths (Ukrainian: На вістрі двох правд, 1992; part of book New Degeneration, foreword by Yurii Andrukhovych), a book of poems.
- Always and Never (Ukrainian: Завжди і ніколи, 1999), a book of poems.
- Infection (Ukrainian: Інфекція, 2002), a novel.
- Totem (Ukrainian: Тотем, 2005), a novel.
- Sacrifice (Ukrainian: Жертвопринесення, 2007), a novel.
- Tightrope Walkers (Ukrainian: Канатохідці, 2007), a book of essays.
- Destruction of a Doll (Ukrainian: Руйнування ляльки, 2010), a novel.
- Blood Test (Ukrainian: Аналіз крові, 2010), a book of essays.
- The Rose of Ritual Pain (Ukrainian: Троянда ритуального болю, 2010), a novel.
- Masks Fall off Slowly (Ukrainian: Маски опадають повільно, 2011), a novel.
- Black Apple (Ukrainian: Чорне яблуко, 2011), a novel.
- Hit Your Head against the Wall (Ukrainian: Бийся головою до стіни, 2011), a novel.
- Tenth Line (Ukrainian: Десятий рядок, 2014), a novel.
- Under the Wings of the Great Mother (Ukrainian: Під крилами великої матері, 2015), a novel.
- The Grass Cannot Die (Ukrainian: Травам не можна помирати, 2017), a novel.
- Fingers in the sand (Ukrainian: Пальці між піском, 2017), a novel.
- Rejected and Risen: Essays on Writers and Society (Ukrainian: Відкинуті і воскреслі: Есе про письменників і суспільство, 2020), a book of essays.
- Hands and Tears: A Novel about Ivan Franko (Ukrainian: Руки і сльози. Роман про Івана Франка, 2022), a novel.
- Moon, Moon (Ukrainian: Місяцю, місяцю, 2023), a novel about Hryhir Tiutiunnyk.
- Pan: A Novel about Yevhen Chykalenko (Ukrainian: Пан. Роман про Євгена Чикаленка, 2024), a novel.

== Awards and recognition ==
Stepan Protsiuk is considered to be among the most popular Ukrainian intellectual writers of his generation.

On 26 June 2026, by a decree marking Constitution Day, President Volodymyr Zelenskyy conferred on Protsiuk the honorary title of Merited Art Worker of Ukraine (Ukrainian: Заслужений діяч мистецтв України).

He is the 2015 winner of the "Golden Ukrainian Writers" award for the largest circulation of books in Ukraine. Protsiuk's novels Infection and Tenth line were nominated for Shevchenko National Prize in 2003 and 2016, respectively. His novels Hands and Tears and Moon, Moon were shortlisted for the 2024 Shevchenko National Prize, and Pan for the 2026 award. Pan was also shortlisted for the 2024 BBC Book of the Year award, and in September 2025 it brought Protsiuk the eighth Ivan Korsak Literary Prize, an annual award for Ukrainian-language historical fiction, presented in Lutsk. Apart from nationwide awards, Protsiuk received various local awards in Ivano-Frankivsk Oblast, such as Ivan Franko Literary Award (2002) and Vasyl Stefanyk Literary Award (2003).

Protsiuk's works have been translated into several languages. In late 2008, Protsiuk's novel Totem was published in the Azerbaijani language in publishing house Vektor in Baku. His short stories and poems have been translated into the German, Russian, Slovak, Polish, Czech, and French languages. In 2025 his novel Hit Your Head against the Wall was published in Czech as Tluč hlavou o zeď by the Prague publishing house Volvox Globator, in a translation by Jiřina Dvořáková. Protsiuk's presentation were held in dozens of Ukrainian cities, as well as in Chicago (in Ukrainian Institute of Modern Art), New York, Rome (in the Embassy of Ukraine), Paris, Berlin, Helsinki, Kraków and other cities.

Several works by Stepan Protsiuk are included in the list of literature recommended for reading in middle and high school in Ukraine. Along with several other poetic groups created in the late 1980s and early 1990s, group New Degeneration co-founded by Protsiuk is included in the program of External independent evaluation, the statewide test used for admission to universities. Protsiuk's books for teenagers are recommended for reading in 7th grade, while his novel Infection is recommended for students of 11th grade.

Protsiuk's literary legacy is the subject of two scholarly books (by Bohdan Pastuh and Oleh Solovey), one play based on Protsiuk's novel Infection (Tetiana Kinzerska), and numerous scientific and journalist articles.

== Bibliography ==
Books about Stepan Protsiuk:

- Pastuh, Bohdan (2016). Одвічні суперечності серця: проза Степана Процюка. Discursus. (Eternal Discrepancies of the Heart: Stepan Protsiuk's Prose)
- Solovey, Oleh (2017). Оргазм і відчай (випадок Степана Процюка). Prostir literatury. (Orgasm and Despair (The Case of Stepan Protsiuk))

Fiction books based on Protsiuk's works:

- Kinzerska, Tetiana (2018). Перехрестя (інсценізація роману С. Процюка "Інфекція). Poltavskyi literator. (Crossroad (Adaptation of S. Protsiuk's Novel Infection))
