= Tiutiunnyk =

Tiutiunnyk, Tiutiunnik, Tyutyunnik, etc. is a Ukrainian-language surname. It is an occupational surname derived from ahy occupation related to growing/manufacturing/selling tobacco (tiutiun, тютюн in Ukrainian).

The surname may refer to:

- Hryhir Tiutiunnyk (1931-1980), Ukrainian writer
- Hryhoriy Tiutiunnyk (1920-1961), Ukrainian writer
- Katia Tiutiunnik (born 1967), Australian composer, scholar and violist
- Mykola Tiutiunnyk (born 1949), Ukrainian writer
- Vasyl Tyutyunnyk (1890-1919), Russian and Ukrainian military commander
- Vasyl Tyutyunnyk (singer) (1860-1924), Ukrainian singer, stage director, and music educator
- Yuriy Tyutyunnyk (1891-1930), Russian and Ukrainian military commander
