= The Yellow Prince =

1963 novel by Vasyl Barka

- 1968 edition
- Author: Vasyl Barka
- Original title: Жовтий князь
- Language: Ukrainian
- Genre: Novel
- Publication date: 1963 (1 vol.); 2008 (1+2 vol.)

The Yellow Prince (Ukrainian: Жовтий князь, romanized: Zhovtyi kniaz) is a 1963 novel by the Ukrainian writer Vasyl Barka. The novel was about the Holodomor genocide of the Ukrainian nation in 1932–1933.

== Publication history ==
Barka began writing down his memories and witness statements in 1943 while he was in a displaced Persons camp in Germany and began to analyse the records in New York in 1950. He has been thinking about the topic of the Holodomor genocide for 25 years whether to be a poem, drama or novel. He alleged that "Everything was somehow disorganised, first was a "working model" for the plot emerged. This plot is a true story of the fate of one family." Then Vasyl revised six hundred manuscript pages of the Zhovtyi kniaz thoroughly four times and rewrote everything from beginning to end.

The title of the work is an allusion to the biblical rider on a yellow horse in Revelation 6:8 (pale = pale yellow).

== Conception ==
The novel is based on Vasyl Barka's personal memoirs of the genocide of Ukrainians in 1932–1933, organised by the USSR government. Although Barka did not personally visit the village in those years, he preserved the exact memories of his brother, whose family was tortured by starvation. After that, he spent twenty-five years carefully collecting witness accounts of the Holodomor genocide, which gave rise to broad literary generalisations.

The writer depicts the catastrophe of the Ukrainian nation during the Holodomor through the personal tragedy of the Katrannyk family, of whom only the youngest son, Andriyko, survives: a typical situation from real life. The pictures of the family's life are filled with striking, frightening details. But in all situations, the characters remain faithful to provincial and human morality. Even the hungry, dying Myron Danylovych does not reveal the location of the church chalice, a shrine hidden from Komsomol gangs.

Andriyko also wants to share his last bread with a complete stranger, a woman on the verge of starvation. This story is in line with the numerous instances of charity witnessed in the face of death.

The novel ends optimistically, with a new day dawning on the earth, bringing hope.

When Radio Liberty commemorated the 30th anniversary of the Holodomor in 1963, the programme featured a speech by Vasyl Barka in which the author spoke about his novel Zhovtyi kniaz:

The novel Zhovtyi kniaz tells the story of one family in 1932-1933; one white house that turned black and turned into a coffin. Its fate is depicted against the backdrop of the life, or actually the dying, of the entire Ukraine during the famine, the 30th anniversary of which we are now observing.

The story is based on personal memories and many details of that time, collected over the years. Most typical cases of the terrible era are reflected in the novel. The story has three plans of content: the first, a completely realistic account of all the domestic dramas of one family and its clashes with the outside world, during trips and travels in search of food. The second plan of the story is entirely psychological, depicting the unusual changes in mental life caused by mass starvation. The dying people, though mortally indifferent to everything in the world except food, for the most part retained their humanity: in the deepest corner, at the bottom of their hearts. They remained people, better than those who caused the famine and lived contentedly during the national misery and death. The third plan of the story is metaphysical, purely spiritual: with the opening of the curtain from the mysterious and terrible world of the immaterial world, which is unknown to us, opposed to heaven and humanity. Here is one of the pages of the spiritual war of human souls against their enemy.

In this struggle, the whole nation suffers its greatest and most terrible test.

Barka worked on the second volume of the novel almost until the last days of his life, in a feverish hurry, anticipating that he would not have time to finish it properly. Bohdanna Monchak, who typed the handwritten text of this volume on a computer, recalls that the author managed to proofread only the first chapter. Nevertheless, the artistic quality of the second volume is in no way inferior to that of the first, and the psychological and metaphysical elements here are even superior to the previous ones.

Vasyl Barka also worked on the topic of the Holodomor genocide in other works, in particular in his poetry. There we find overlaps between biblical stories and the history of the Holodomor:

The sunflowers pray: The thunder on the cloud reads the Bible... the poplar whispers: How terrible is your cry, Isaiah!
The sunflowers are praying. Famine; a mother kills her baby... the poplar cries out: how great is my paradise, Isaiah!

== Main characters ==
- Myron Danylovych Katrannyk was the Daria's husband;
- Dariia Oleksandrivna Katrannyk was the Myron's wife;
- Mykola Myronovych Katrannyk was the first child of Daria and Myron;
- Olena Myronivna Katrannyk was the daughter of Dariia and Myron;
- Andrii Myronovych Katrannyk was the youngest son of Dariia and Myron;
- Kharytyna Hryhorivna Katrannyk was the Myron's mother.

== Publication history ==
The first volume of the novel (the author called it a novella) was published in 1963 by the publishing company "Suchasnist" (New York-Munich).

At the same time, the author addressed the following letter to Soviet writers in Ukraine:

In the year 1933, millions of sisters and brothers dear to all of us, our flesh and bone and blood, those from among whom we came, were despised and feared, and in this misery were crushed by the Juggernaut's chariot of organised, ordered famine - crushed to death.

But let's ask: why is it still forbidden to mention those ten million desecrated souls from our nation?

Silence! We understand and do not blame: because it is forbidden.

So, when it is still not allowed to raise your voice for the victims of the famine, at least read a modest story about them by an author who gave up everything in his life to finally be able to tell about them.

In 1968, the novel was reprinted in New York by the Ukrainian National Women's League of America.

And in 1981, Zhovtyi kniaz was published in French by the prestigious French publishing Gallimard (as Le Prince jaune) in a translation by Olha Yavorska with a foreword by the French writer Petro Ravych.

Zhovtyi kniaz was also published in German as Der Gelbe Fürst.

In Ukraine, Zhovtyi kniaz became available to readers in 1991: it was published by Dnipro publishing house with a foreword by academician Mykola Zhulynskyi.

After Ukraine's liberation from the USSR in 1991, Vasyl Barka's work was included in the Ukrainian literature curriculum in secondary schools. However, after Viktor Yanukovych came to the presidency, the Ministry of Education insisted on replacing this work with another that did not address the genocide of Ukrainians in 1932–1933. At the same time, Minister of Education Dmytro Tabachnyk demagogically referred to the low literary quality of Barka's work.

Based on this novel, Oles Yanchuk created the film Famine-33 at the Dovzhenko Film Studios. In December 1991, before the referendum, it was shown all night on all Ukrainian television channels, while Gorbachev's speech was also shown, where he threatened Ukraine with "blood, fire and devastation" if citizens voted for independence, and it undoubtedly influenced the viewers' decision to vote for Ukraine's independence.

== Reviews ==
Reviews of the French press after the publication by Gallimard: Art presse: "A good book. A terrible book... A great tragic work that is absolutely worth reading";

Le républikain Lorran: "Seven million Ukrainians died from persecution and starvation... this is a book so moving that even the hardened heart will respond to it."

La nouvelle revue française: "Organised Ukrainians should nominate the master of the creator word for the Nobel Prize"

In the US, the Secretary of Agriculture called this work "one of the main sources for studying the history of the USSR's agricultural policy".

== Translations ==
The novel has been translated into French (1981), Russian (1991 — magazine version, 2001 — book version), German (2009), Italian (2017) and Macedonian (2023).

== Sources ==
- Novel Zhovtyi kniaz in e-library ukrclassic.com.ua
- Magazine «Panianka»
- Українська література: Хрестоматія. 11 клас / Укладачі Т. О. Харахоріна, В. С. Адаменко, Т. В. Ткачук.
- Ася Гумецька Передмова. // Василь Барка. Жовтий князь: Документальний роман, том I і II
- Vasyl Barka. The Yellow Prince: A Documentary Novel, Volume I and II. — Харків: Видавництво «Майдан»; Нью-Йорк: Видання Українська Вільна Академія Наук у США, 2008. — 772с. — ISBN 978-966-372-240-5.
- Леонід Полтава, «Жовтий князь» з Свободи, 19 грудня 1967 р. Микола Вірний
- Д. О. Свідник. Василь Барка — письменник апокаліпсису // Поступ, 14.05.2003.
- M. Слабошпицький. Василь Барка. Із життєпису білого монаха // Українське життя в Севастополі
- Марко Роберт Стех. Пишучи роман про Голодомор, Василь Барка по кілька днів відмовлявся від їжі // zik.ua, 23.11.2017
- Раїса Мовчан. Самітник в океані життя, або Дні і Труди Василя Барки // День, 18.02.2011
