= Do Oxen Low When Mangers are Full? =

1875 novel by Panas Myrny and Ivan Rudchenko

- Cover of the 1990 English translation
- Author: Panas Myrny; Ivan Bilyk
- Original title: Хіба ревуть воли, як ясла повні?
- Language: Ukrainian
- Genre: Social novel, Literary realism, Epic, Fiction
- Published: 1880
- Publisher: MOST Publishing (in Ukrainian); Dnipro publishers (in English)
- Publication place: Switzerland; UkrSSR
- English publication date: 1990
- Media type: paperback
- Pages: 329
- ISBN: 5-308-00763-2
- Original text: Хіба ревуть воли, як ясла повні? at Ukrainian Wikisource

Do Oxen Low When Mangers are Full? (Ukrainian: Хіба ревуть воли, як ясла повні?, romanized: Khiba revut voly, yak yasla povni?, (Note: Originally written in Drahomanivka as «Хиба ревуть воли, јак јасла повні?») also translated as Do Oxen Bellow, When Their Mangers are Full?), sometimes called The Ruined Strength (Ukrainian: Пропаща сила, romanized: Propashcha syla) is an 1875 epic realist novel by Panas Myrny and Ivan Bilyk. Centred on the village of Pisky in present-day Poltava Oblast, the novel focuses on the village's history from the liquidation of the Zaporozhian Sich to the emancipation reform of 1861.

Originally published by Panas Myrny as a novella under the title of Chipka in 1872, the work was later expanded with the assistance of Ivan Bilyk, extensively broadening its scope and scale. Originally intended to be printed in mid-1876, publication was derailed by the Ems Ukaz, which banned the printing of the Ukrainian language, and it was sent to Geneva, where it was published by exiled Ukrainian intellectual Mykhailo Drahomanov in 1880. Do Oxen Low is Myrny's most-recognised work, and is considered by PEN Ukraine to be among the greatest works of Ukrainian literature in history. It has been praised for its depiction of serfdom in Russia, tsarist autocracy, and Ukrainian resistance to the Russian Empire.

== Plot ==
Do Oxen Low primarily focuses on the village of Pisky in Central Ukraine, though other locations, such as Southern Ukraine, Russia proper, and Hungary, are also included. There are three primary storylines throughout the novel, all of which occur simultaneously in the roughly century-long period between the 1775 liquidation of the Zaporozhian Sich to the 1861 emancipation reform that led to the abolition of serfdom. Two of them reflect Ukrainians' resistance to the Russian Empire, while one reflects landlordism in Ukraine.

The main character for three of the book's four sections is Nikifor Ivanovich "Chipka" Varenichenko, a peasant from Pisky and a bastard child. Chipka develops a strong sense of resentment towards the world after being bullied by other children, beaten by his mother, and enduring severe poverty. He develops a strong sense of justice and opposes "life which had divided people into masters and servants." One section of the book (part two) is divided between the Hudz family of Cossacks and the Polski family, landlords of Pisky. The stories of the Hudz and Polski families frequently intersect with Chipka's own, particularly as the story progresses.

=== Part one ===
Chipka becomes a herdsman for Ulas, a serf to the landlord Polski, and greatly enjoys the job, in contrast to his previous short-lived time as a cattlehand. Working for Ulas, Chipka's family finally begins to experience economic fortunes, which are furthered after a distant relative's death leads to them acquiring a plot of farmland. However, his grandmother's death, followed by Ulas revealing both his fear of being taken by his landlord and the true story of Chipka's father, both intensify Chipka's hatred of "the masters".

At the end of the summer, Ulas is made a house-servant, and Chipka proposes to the commune that he take his place as leader of the herdsmen. Rejected, he becomes a farmer on his family's plot, growing rye. While examining his crops one day, he encounters a woman, and instantly falls in love with her. She runs off, and Chipka becomes fascinated, returning the next day to find her making a Ukrainian wreath. After kissing her, the two briefly talk before she returns home. Having discovered where the woman lives and her name (Halya), Chipka loses much of his previous pessimism and begins frequently returning to his field, wanting to see her again.

The focus then shifts to Hritsko. After Ulas's departure, Hritsko becomes a seasonal worker and travels south. Hritsko devotes himself to his labour in an effort to earn money to purchase a homestead, but only earns one hundred rubles. Undeterred, he continues working over the winter, travelling to Kherson. While successful, he resolves to stay until the next autumn and continue to earn money. Upon his return, Hritsko purchases a homestead and becomes one of the more prestigious people in the village. His newfound wealth, however, brings him to look down on the poor. He eventually falls in love with a servant. Despite her lack of wealth or beauty, they marry, and the two move to Hritsko's homestead. There, they become an ideal couple to their fellow villagers, maintaining a positive relationship and continuing to earn wealth.

=== Part two ===
Part two begins by refocusing the story on the Hudz family. It starts with Mirin, a Zaporozhian Cossack. Following the Sich's liquidation, he marries Marina, the daughter of a fellow Cossack, and settles down. The couple's son, Ivan, becomes a peasant, maturing along the backdrop of increasing inequality on the former Sich lands, and Mirin laments that the former equality of the Sich has been replaced by Tsarist autocracy. He frequently debates with his fellow elders, while younger residents, discontented by life under Russia, come to his side. Following the annexation of Yedisan by Russia, Mirin allows Ivan to marry. With his wife, he has three sons. Maxim, the oldest, is fascinated by Mirin's stories of the Zaporozhian Sich, but the lord Polski, a former member of the szlachta who had risen to the rank of general under Russia, soon becomes lord of the manor of Pisky.

Mirin soon disappears. Not long after, the Russian army descends upon the village to enforce Polski's lordship. The population, in fear, disperses to their homes, but Mirin soon returns to Ivan with a government certificate guaranteeing the family's freedom from serfdom. The residents of Pisky are soon divided into two parts: the free and Polski's serfs. After General Polski's death, the land is taken over by his wife, who proves even more tyrannical and prone to Ukrainophobia. After the lady's death, she is succeeded by her eldest son. He takes as a servant Chipka's eventual father, only to find him useless.

Returning to the Hudz family, Ivan's sons are raised to enjoy their agrarian lifestyle. Maxim, however, craves freedom, and becomes a village prankster. Fed up, his parents order him to join the army, and he immediately agrees. He becomes a member of the Russian Imperial Guard. During this time, he discovers the Russian way of life and is disconcerted, contrasting the violence of Russia with peaceful life on the steppe. During the Hungarian Revolution of 1848, he is sent as part of Russia's expeditionary force to support Austria. Maxim watches his fellow Ukrainians die in battle, and is promoted to sergeant major.

He soon meets Yavdokha, a Ukrainian villager raised in poverty. The two have a child, named Halya, and Maxim returns to Pisky after thirty years of service to find a completely changed village. Maxim renovates his father's house to be large and spacious, but, like Hritsko, his wealth leads him to look down upon the peasantry. He soon moves away to a nearby hamlet, developing it. He becomes secluded and locks the hamlet off from the world, with many believing him dead.

=== Part three ===
By a decision of the Russian government, Chipka's land is handed over to a nephew of Chipka's deceased relative. He decides to sue, and in his rage, scares off Halya. He meets Porokh, who writes petitions for Pisky's villagers, and listens as he rants about how the Polski family has financially ruined him. Porokh's anger adds fuel to Chipka's again-rising hate for "the masters", and Chipka stays the night. The next day, he meets the Chief Court Clerk Chizik, who demands fifty rubles in order for Chipka to keep his land. Furious, Chipka leaves. At Porokh's hut, he drinks, and the alcohol, combined with his anger, causes him to fall asleep. Porokh steals Chipka's money - his mother's savings, which he had brought in order to pay for the lawsuit.

Returning to Pisky, Chipka pawns off his coat to drink. The other villagers soon gather to watch him drink as he expresses fury at the injustices of the government, and he makes three acquaintances: (Note: Referred to collectively as "the pals" or "Chipka's buddies" in the text.) Lushnya, Matnya, and Patsyuk, (Note: Ukrainian: Пацюк, lit. 'the rat'.) all three of whom are former serfs. The three take advantage of Chipka, pawning off his family's possessions to buy alcohol. Unable to cope, his mother has the volost office arrest him, but he is broken out by the pals, who go with him to shout at his mother. She leaves, and Chipka continues to fall into alcoholism.

Chipka and the pals decide to sell his rye in order to make a profit, but they encounter trouble when Chipka refuses to sell to a Jew. After becoming drunk from vodka Matnya stole, he reveals that he will only sell it to Hritsko. While discussing the sale with his friend, Chipka is brought to describe the loss of his land and Chizhik's bribery to Hritsko and his wife, and they are convinced. Hritsko's wife comes to sympathise with Chipka, comparing the injustice against him to her own experience as an orphan.

Amidst a drunken brawl with the pals, Chipka remembers Porokh and the injustice of the landlords, and decides to turn to thievery. He steals the local landlord's grain, kills a watchman, and is arrested afterwards. He feigns uninvolvement to officials, and is released. The next day, the volost chief is lassoed in his bedroom, and the attackers make off with his money. The volost clerk, too, is tied up in his home. Those responsible are not found: Chipka has hidden the money. Meanwhile, Hritsko, jealous of his wife's concern for Chipka, revels in telling her of his exploits, while she is horrified by his crimes.

With the two-year transition period underway following the emancipation reform, Pisky's residents become eager for emancipation, with the exception of Chipka and the pals, who are too drunk to care. Christmas brings drunken revelry, leading to widespread expression of resentment towards serfdom. When Epiphany comes, the villagers believe they have been cheated, as the lords demand compensation. They mobilise and march towards the Polskis' manor house, where they demand repayment for the past two years' work. The landlord refuses, and the serfs begin jeering and protesting, remaining in the courtyard of the manor house until nightfall.

The landlord flees, and a group of soldiers descends on Pisky to disrupt the serfs. Refusing to surrender, they come together in the centre of the village and begin fighting with the soldiers. In the ensuing chaos, Ulas falls to the ground and is dragged off. Chipka, witnessing Ulas's fall, is enraged, and joins the peasants. The pals flee, but Chipka persists despite continued beatings. He recognises the pals' uselessness and curses them, going to the tavern.

Chipka dreams of having killed the watchman, abandoned Ulas and his mother, and the landlords' oppression of the peasantry. He imagines Halya chastising him for his crimes, and curses her as Pisky goes up in flames. Waking, he finds the town silent, having been subdued by the soldiers.

In the distant Krutiy Yar, meanwhile, the pals contemplate returning to Pisky to see Chipka. Against the wishes of Lushnya and Matnya, Patsyuk decides that they should return. There, Lushnya lies that the three of them had been arrested. While laying on Chipka's oven, Lushnya listens as the former condemns the Tsarist autocracy and system of serfdom. He declares that the landlords, the priesthood, and the tavern keeper must all pay for their exploitation of the poor. He briefly discusses Halya before going to sleep. While he sleeps, Lushnya flees, and the three pals go to work at the tavern in Pobivanka.

Chipka then goes to see his mother, and apologises for his misdeeds, requesting forgiveness. His mother tells him to get a job, to which he agrees, working as a hand for a German in Krutiy Yar. Soon comes Shrovetide, and with it, freedom from serfdom. Riots for free distribution of land break out in Pisky, as in the rest of Ukraine, but Chipka is unaware; he is too busy refurbishing his house to prepare for his mother's return. He begins to rebuild his life and becomes foreman of the haymakers, resumes his friendship with Hritsko, and enlarges his property, buying a cow after landlords requisition livestock from former serfs. But he remains despondent about his lack of a woman, and crime in the region begins to increase.

=== Part four ===
Chipka goes out one night to meet with the pals, who bring five unknown men in tow. They have determined to rob Heshko, a Jew from Stavishche. As a rule, anyone who is captured during the robbery will be killed. Following their return, it is revealed that one of the men is Maxim. He again meets Halya, who is revealed to be Maxim's daughter. She expresses her disgust at Chipka for being a murderer, a characterisation he resists. Chipka then embraces and kisses her, only for her to run off. He returns to sleep, and leaves the next day.

A day later, Chipka meets Halya again, but his advances are rebuffed. He discovers she has been betrothed to Sidir, one of the five unknown men. The two again argue about the nature of banditry and justice, and Halya tells Chipka that continuing a relationship would be impossible. He then convinces Sidir to break off the engagement by paying him 25 rubles. Likewise, Halya tells Yavdokha that she cannot bear to be engaged to a soldier, and soon, with Hritsko as the matchmaker, the two are married. They begin living together, and, when the pals come to visit Chipka, he gives them a ruble so that they may leave him alone, as he enjoys spending time with Hritsko more. Halya becomes godmother to Hritsko's second son, who is born after Christmas of that year. After Easter, Chipka's house is expanded from one room to three, and the Varenichenko family becomes among the most prominent members of the town.

The next chapter describes how the abolition of serfdom led to a decrease in the powers of the nobility and caused the rise of the zemstvo as a means of peasant self-government. Upon being introduced to the system, Chipka (by now a local celebrity) brings his fellow villagers to support the system, voting decisively against the landlords. He is elected both to the zemstvo and the district council. However, soon, the landlords, using the grain theft case from Chipka's past, force him to resign. In response, Chipka, working with Porokh, files a complaint to annul elections to the district council; the young lord Polski, son of the landlord who had brought in soldiers against the serfs, is forced to resign.

Maxim soon dies, and Chipka's complaint is rejected. Yavdokha moves in, leading to further conflict, and Chipka's increasing involvement in politics upsets Halya. Chipka and his pals party, occasionally with Hritsko, though the conflicts between Hritsko and the pals soon become apparent. Chipka again turns to a life of crime, much to the complaint of Halya and his mother. Yavdokha soon dies, and Lushnya claims that Chipka's mother was responsible. The event leads to a rift in the family, undermining Chipka's local stature.

The next winter, the pals return with Sidir and others. They again go to undertake robberies, and they return after having killed a family and set their house aflame. Chipka and his gang are arrested, and Halya hangs herself. Soon, they are brought back through Pisky on the way to Siberia for hard labour. Hritsko and his wife take in Chipka's mother, who dies soon after. As the passage of time continues, the manor is bought by Danilo Kryazhov, the son of one of those who forced Chipka from the council, and it becomes the site of numerous parties. Meanwhile, Chipka's house, now deserted, is purchased by Hreshko and converted to a tavern. The burial mound of the family killed by Chipka, rising above Romodan, terrifies those who go there.

== History ==
=== Chipka (1872) ===
Panas Rudchenko, better known by the pen name of Panas Myrny, was first inspired to write a story about criminals after he was told that Hnydka, a locally-infamous mobster in Poltava Governorate, was sentenced to hard labour. While being told of Hnydka's sentencing during a stagecoach ride from the city of Poltava to Hadiach, Rudchenko was struck by the fact that the coachman was sympathetic towards Hnydka, saying that he had lived an unfortunate life. After the event, he first wrote an article and then spent four years writing the first version of what would eventually become Do Oxen Low, publishing it in 1871 or November 1872, under the name Chipka.

Unlike later versions of Do Oxen Low, Chipka is a novella singularly focused on its titular character. However, by this point, the peculiarities of Rudchenko's style of writing, namely the heavy usage of retrospection, had already begun to establish his difference from other Ukrainian writers of the period such as Ivan Nechuy-Levytsky, Ivan Franko, and Mykhailo Kotsiubynsky. In reviewing Chipka, Dmitry Pilchikov, an author and Rudchenko's acquaintance, assessed the work as having "French taste", which literary historian Leonid Ushkalov notes was likely in reference to Eugène Sue and Alexandre Dumas, among others.

=== Involvement of Ivan, expansion ===
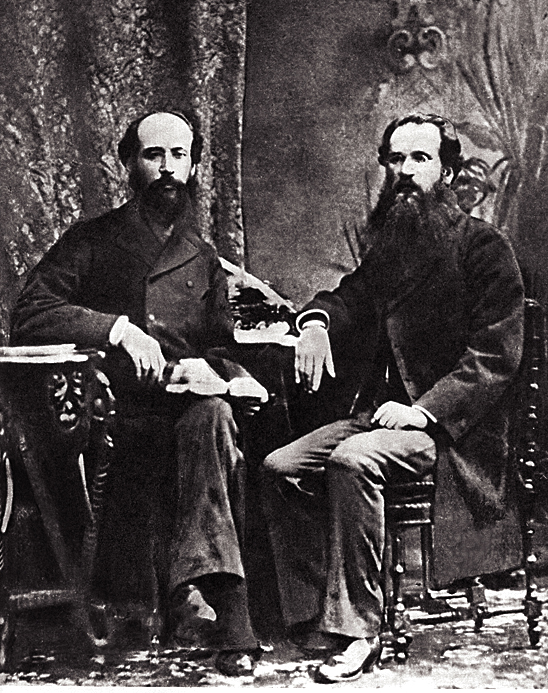
Brothers Panas Myrny and Ivan Bilyk, 1881. The two worked together on what would eventually become Do Oxen Low.

Another review by Rudchenko's brother Ivan, better known as author Ivan Bilyk, positively assessed the novella as containing strong elements of social realism in a similar style to that of Fyodor Reshetnikov. He particularly praised Chipka for its depiction of crime and punishment within Russian society. More negatively, however, Ivan criticised Chipka's depiction as unrealistic, arguing for his portrayal as a more exhausted, unenviable figure, and believed in the possibility for greater depiction of the Ukrainian national identity in the text. He also criticised a number of plot holes and excessive instances of both violence and repetition in the text.

Panas first made minor changes in accordance with Ivan's criticisms, later publishing a second edition. Working together to resolve the problems with the original, Ivan and Panas expanded the novel's scope dramatically both in terms of time (from a quarter-century to nearly one hundred years) and in terms of characters, creating numerous parallel plots to add further emphasis to the themes of resistance to Russia. "Do oxen low when mangers are full?", which would eventually become the book's title, came a letter from Ivan in which he quoted the Book of Job or the Book of Proverbs.

=== Publication ===
Do Oxen Low finished its extensive re-writing and expansion in mid-autumn 1875, and was sent to censors in Kyiv, who removed references to the Decembrist revolt, the Hungarian revolution, and scenes depicting the nobility in a negative light. It was then sent to Saint Petersburg to be published by Mikhail Stasyulevich under the supervision of Mykola Lysenko. The schedule was to print the novel between mid-May and early August 1876.

However, the passage of the Ems Ukaz meant that Do Oxen Low could not be published in the Russian Empire. It was smuggled abroad to Mykhailo Drahomanov, a Ukrainian intellectual living in exile in Geneva, and published by the Hromada secret society in 1880. It was first legally published in the Russian Empire in a censored form, known as The Ruined Strength, in 1903. Prior to its formal release, however, the full version had been already acquired popularity among underground circles. The full version was first published in Ukraine only in 1925, after Panas' death.

== Themes ==
=== Authoritarianism and serfdom ===
Among the most frequently-noted themes of Do Oxen Low is that of the Tsarist autocracy, serfdom in Russia, and Russian colonialism in Ukraine. Professor Roman Adrian Cybriwsky, during his description of the book as an example of opposition to Russian rule among Ukrainians, remarks, "A takeaway from the book is that Pisky would be much better off without the Russian Empire." Likewise, Ukrainian literary historian Rostyslav Mishchuk, in his introduction to the 1990, describes Chipka's grievances against "the masters" as "very real", and observes that "Unable to combat injustice singlehanded, he turns to crime."

==== Evil begetting evil ====
The character of Chipka has also been assessed as an example of evil furthering evil in a cyclical fashion. Ukrainian-Canadian academic Orest Subtelny suggests that the injustices facing Chipka result in the destruction of his belief in Ukrainian traditional values and bring him to "moral nihilism".

=== Social division and class conflict ===
Social division is one of the major issues presented in Do Oxen Low, though its relation to Marxist class conflict is a matter of some debate. Modern Ukrainian analysis, such as that of Nina Zborovska tends to present the work as cautioning against class hatred and blind pursuit in the beliefs of the collective whole, while Soviet-era Ukrainian literary historian Mykola Syvachenko asserts that Hritsko's individualism plays a role in Chipka's ultimate downfall.

=== Women's rights ===
Syvachenko argues that, like other works by Myrny, Do Oxen Low reflects sympathies towards first-wave feminism in a manner similar to the works of Taras Shevchenko and Nikolay Chernyshevsky. Noting the Polski family's abduction of young women and forcing them to work as servants, he also claims that elements of another, ultimately-unfinished work by Myrny, Before the War (which was to revolve around the rights of women) are included in Do Oxen Low, analysing the similarities between characterisations of Hristko's family and Ulyana, a servant who is kicked out after becoming pregnant, with the character traits of Maria Sheliukivna in Before the War.

== Critical response ==
Since its release, Do Oxen Low has achieved recognition as one of the greatest Ukrainian works of the 19th century, if not ever. Mishchuk, in the preface to the 1990 English translation, opined that it was "the far-ranging epic analysis of those causes which turned the people's strength, the flower of the Ukrainian nation, into the 'wasted strength'." Ushkalov argues that the work has a "unique place" in 19th-century Ukrainian literature. It is the first of the Ukrainian "peasant epics", a group of epic novels describing rural Ukrainian society. PEN Ukraine lists Do Oxen Low among 100 most notable works of Ukrainian literature in history.

More critically, others such as literary historian Oleksandr Biletskyi have complained of the occasionally-disjointed literature and vast scope of the book, with Biletskyi using the metaphor of "a house with many annexes and superstructures, made at different times and not according to a strict plan."
