= Derman Druha =

Rural locality in Rivne Oblast, Ukraine

Derman Druha Дермань Друга
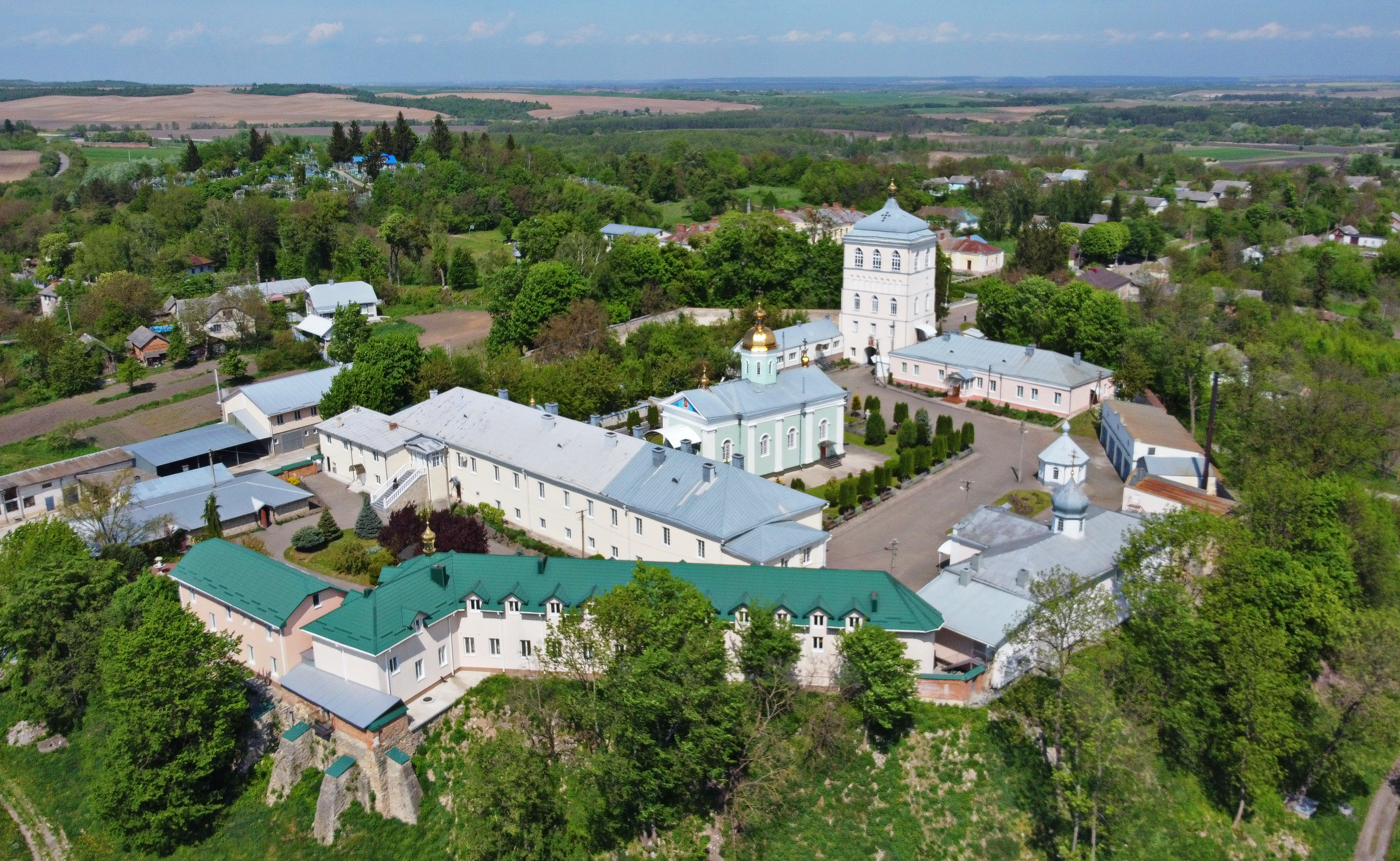
- Defensive walls of Derman Monastery

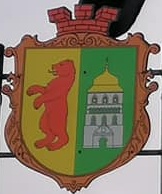
- Coat of arms

- Location in Rivne Oblast
- Coordinates: 50°22′12″N 26°14′59″E
- Country: Ukraine
- Oblast: Rivne Oblast
- Raion: Rivne Raion
- Hromada: Mizoch settlement hromada
- Time zone: UTC+2 (EET)
  - Summer (DST): UTC+3 (EEST)
- Postal code: 35751

Derman Druha (Ukrainian: Дермань Друга) is a village in the Mizoch settlement hromada of the Rivne Raion of Rivne Oblast in Ukraine.

== History ==
The first written mention of the village was in 1322.

In 1602 a monastery was established in Derman by prince Konstanty Wasyl Ostrogski. Soon thereafter part of the Ostroh printing house was moved to the village, and between 1604 and 1605 a number of religious books were printed there. Between 1625 and 1633 Meletius Smotrytsky served as an archimandrite of the monastery. Later the convent came into possession of Basilian monks. In 1821 Russian authorities transferred it to the Orthodox Church. A seminary functioned in the monastery until 1920, and soon thereafter a girls' school was established, which during the 1930s became a private Ukrainian gymnasium.

In early 1918 a rebel squad consisting of soldiers and local peasants headed by Baltic Fleet sailor Anton Dovbenko looted the monastery and the manor of Lubomirski family in Derman. In the aftermath, a detachment of Hetmanate police arrived from Mizoch and punished the detained insurgents by public whipping. In early 1919, a revolutionary committee was created in the village by Bolshevik Party members, proclaiming the so-called "Derman Republic", whose forces also controlled several neighbouring villages. On 3 March 1919 the "republic"'s forces advanced on Zdolbuniv, capturing several artillery pieces and shelling the city. However, the army of Symon Petliura regrouped and defeated the unit, forcing its fighters to disperse. Soon thereafter a Sich Riflemen unit arrived to Derman and suppressed the insurgency. The proclamation of "Derman Republic" was described in the writings of Ulas Samchuk, who was its personal witness.

On 19 July 2020, as a result of the administrative-territorial reform and liquidation of the Zdolbuniv Raion, the village became part of the Rivne Raion.

== Notable residents ==
- Ulas Samchuk (1905–1987), Ukrainian writer, propagandist, publicist, journalist

== Gallery ==
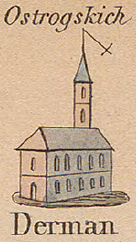
Derman on an old map, signed as a possession of the Ostrogski family

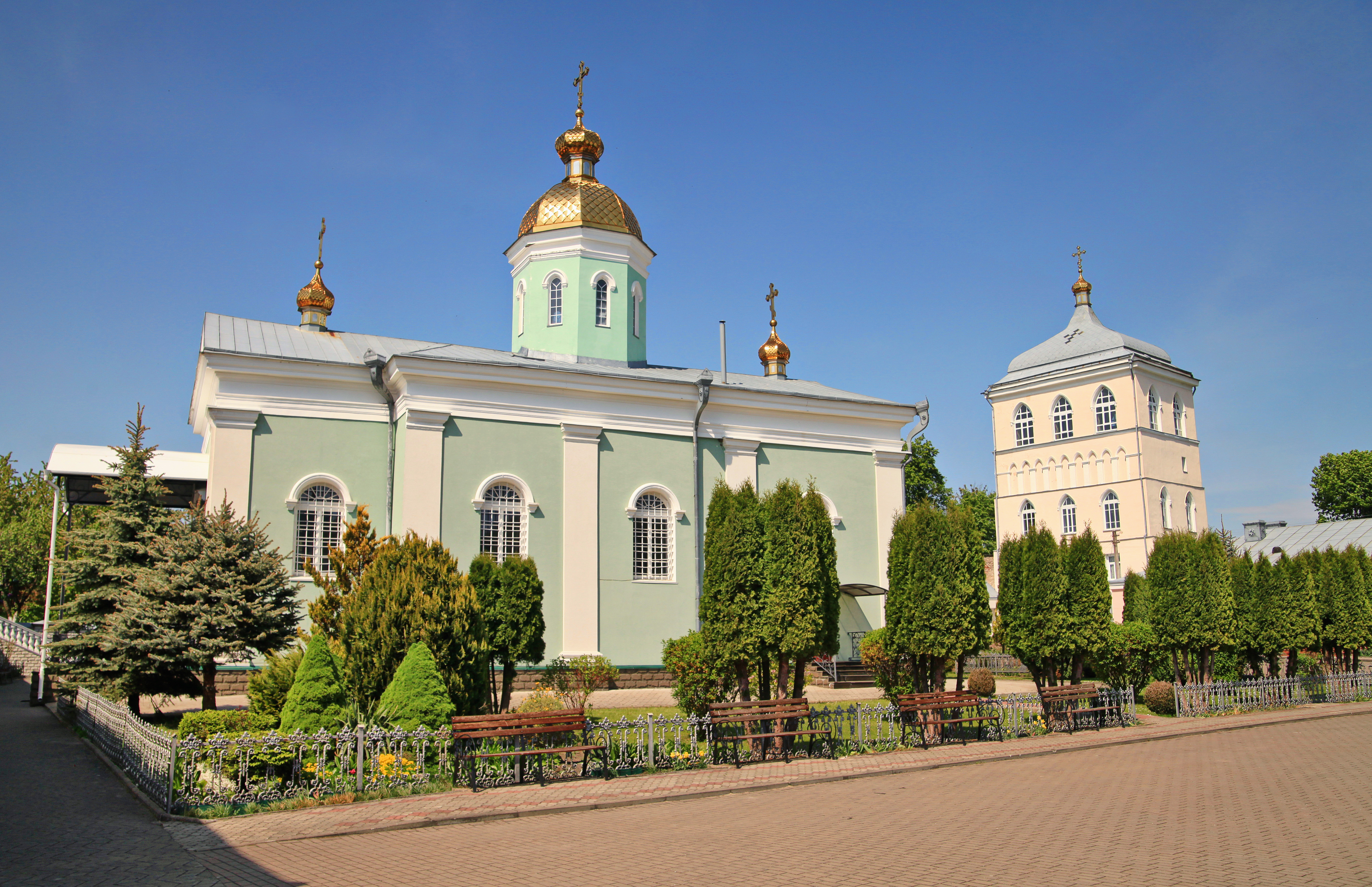
Derman Monastery

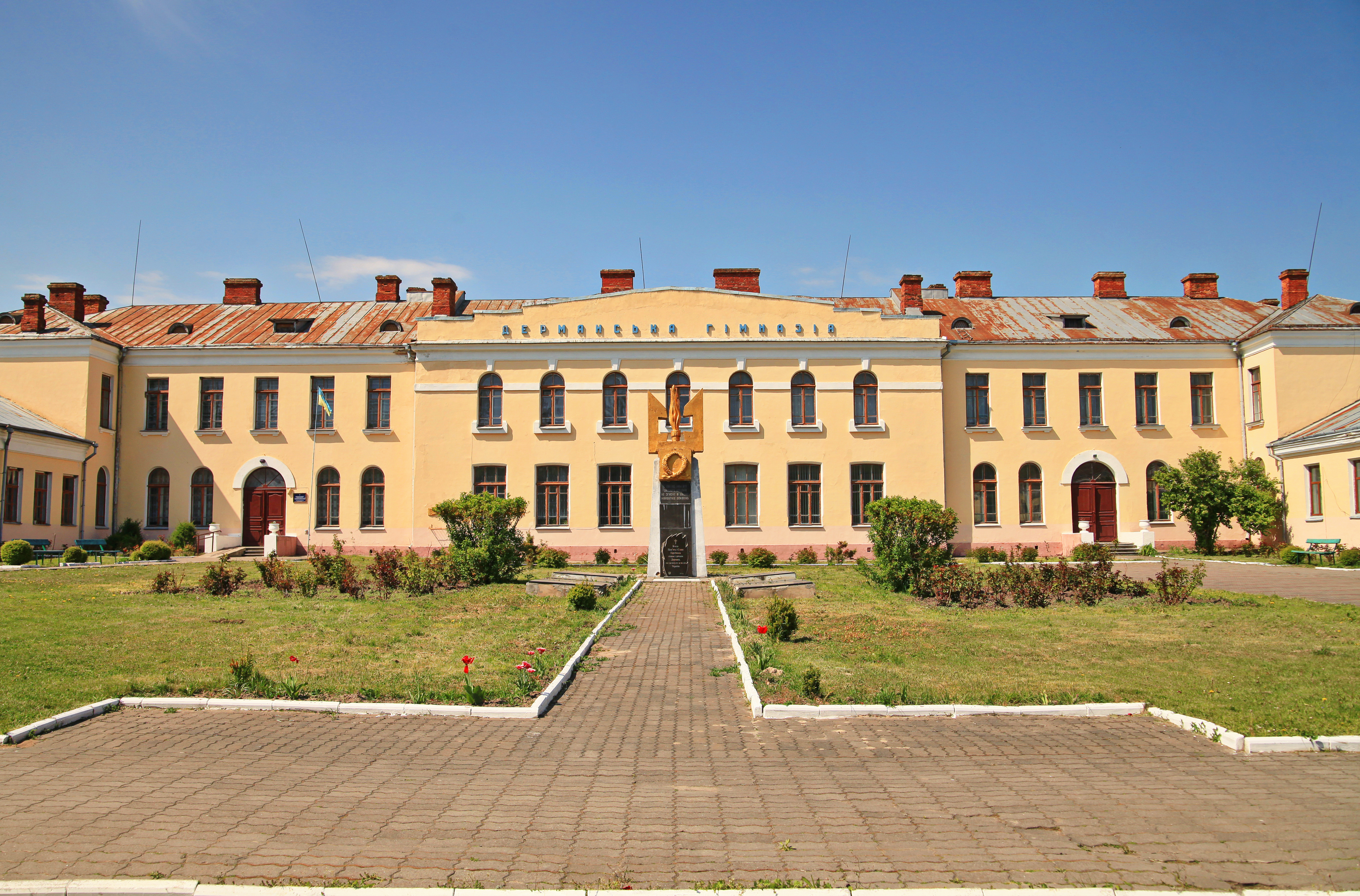
Historical seminary, now a gymnasium

== Sources ==
- "Dermań". Geographical Dictionary of the Kingdom of Poland (in Polish). 2. Warszawa: Kasa im. Józefa Mianowskiego. 1881. p. 8.
- "Dermań". Geographical Dictionary of the Kingdom of Poland (in Polish). p. 404.
