= Panas Myrny =

Ukrainian author

Panas Rudchenko Панас Якович Рудченко (Афанасий Яковлевич Рудченко)
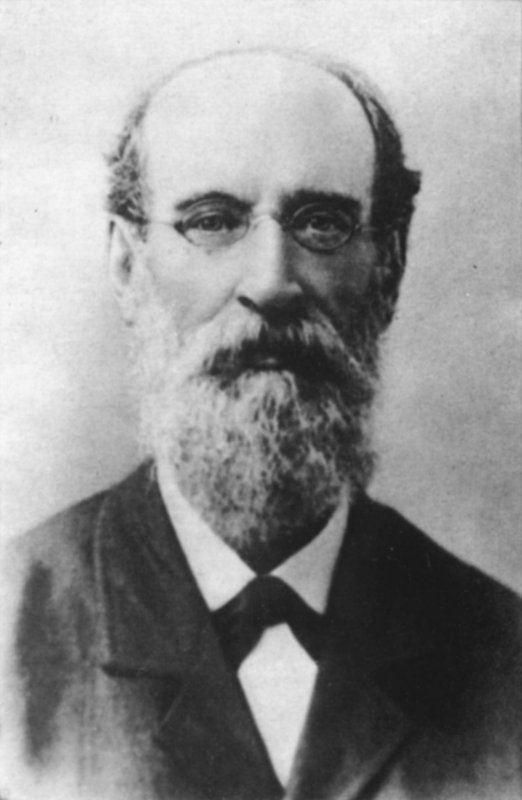
- Born: May 13, 1849; Mirgorod (Myrhorod), Poltava Governorate, Russian Empire
- Died: January 28, 1920 (aged 70); Poltava, Poltava Governorate, Ukrainian SSR
- Citizenship: Russian Empire
- Occupation: Writer
- Writing career
- Pen name: Panas Myrny
- Genre: social novel
- Movement: Realism

Panas Myrny (Ukrainian: Панас Мирний; real name is Panas Yakovych Rudchenko, 13 May 1849 - 28 January 1920) was a famous Ukrainian prose writer and playwright writing in Ukrainian language. He wrote in literary realism creating innovative social novels and stories from the life of the people.

== Biography ==
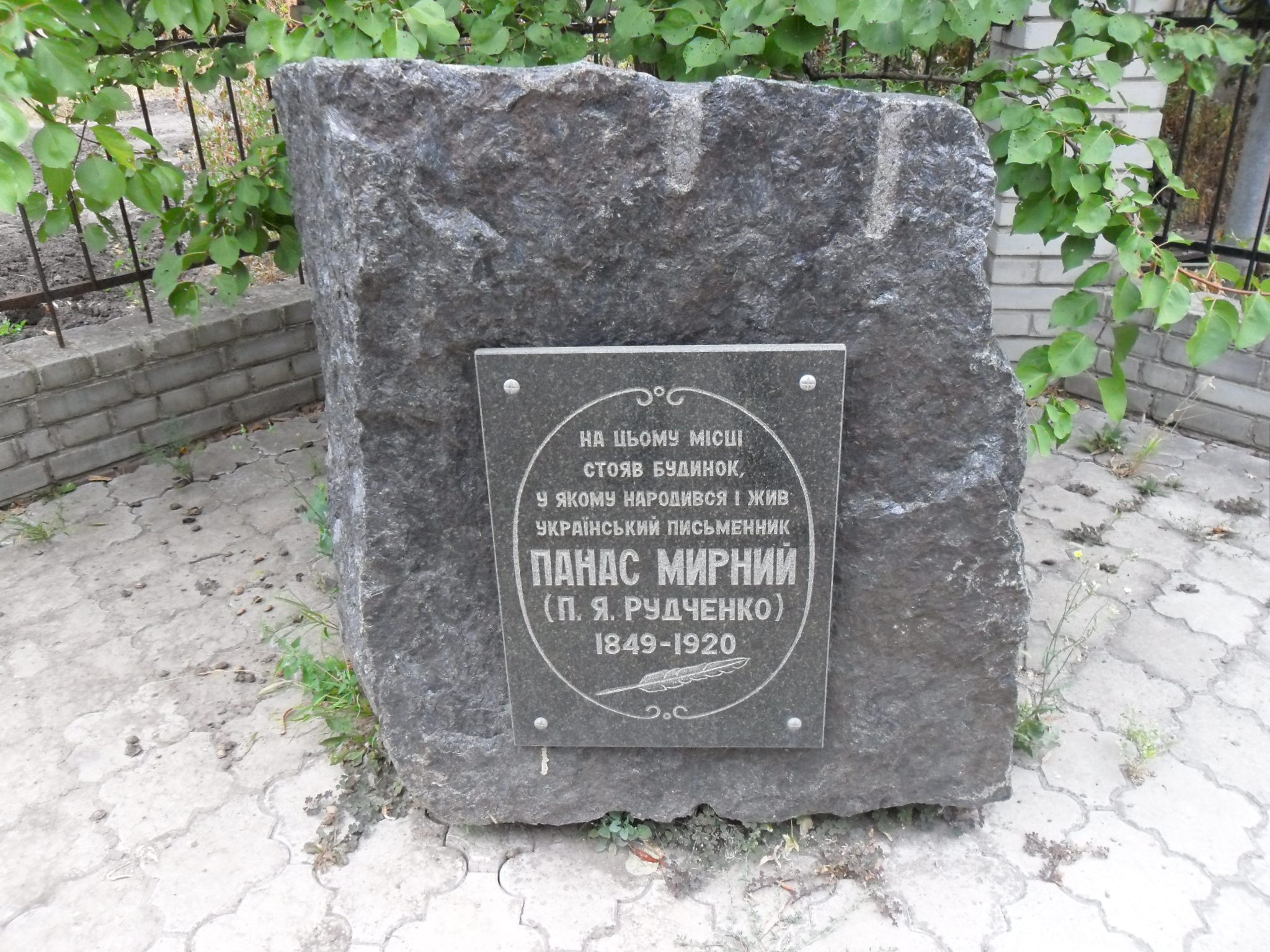
Birthplace of Panas Myrny

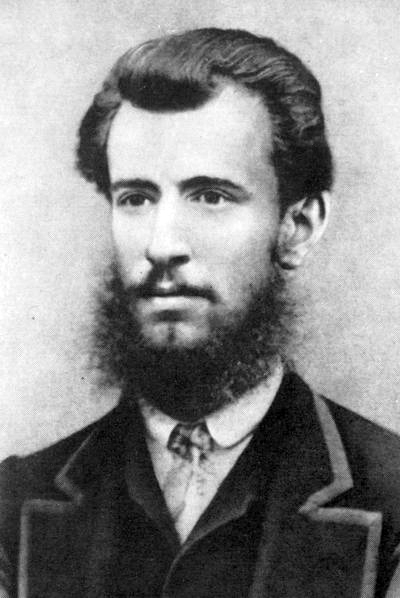
In 1870

Panas Rudchenko was born in 1849 into a family of an accountant of county treasury in Mirgorod (today – Myrhorod). After several years of studying in a parish school of Myrhorod and a county school of Hadyach, at his fourteen Panas had to earn money for living. In 1863 he worked as a petty official in Hadyach county court. Next year Myrny worked as an accountant assistant in the local county treasury. Later after a brief stint in Pryluky, he continued to work at same position in Myrhorod Treasury.

In 1871 Panas Rudchenko settled in Poltava, where he got the rank of State Councilor at the local government house. Literary activity became the real joy for Panas Myrny. Restless, he was sitting at his desk in the evening and enthusiastically devoted himself to his hobby. Shortly before his death in a letter to J. Zubkovsky he requested not to disclose his name:"Although many of my friends know who is Panas Myrny, but I'm in my lifetime would not want to advertise my name, seriously consider it unworthy of those glorifications, which were created around the name of Myrny”. Panas Myrnyi founded the "Zirka" publishing house for children in Poltava.

In 1951, at the writer's birthplace in Poltava, a monument was installed in the courtyard of his museum-estate.

== Works ==
Panas Myrny's best-known work is the novel Do Oxen Low When Mangers are Full?, which he coauthored with his brother, Ivan Rudchenko (also known as Ivan Bilyk). The work can be characterized as a sociopsychological novel-chronicle; it covers almost a century in the history of a Ukrainian village, from serfdom to the post-reform era. In it Myrny depicts social oppression, internal struggle between various social groups, the tsarist legal system, the stern life of a soldier during the time of Tsar Nicholas I, police violence, and spontaneous protests against lies and injustice. The novel was published in 1880 in Geneva with the help of political emigrant Mykhailo Drahomanov.

Myrny's second important sociopsychological novel, Poviia (The Loose Woman, 1884), describes new social processes caused by the reforms of 1861. Myrny also portrayed the changed social dynamics of the village after the abolition of serfdom in the story Lykho davnie i s'ohochasne (Ancient and Contemporary Evil, 1903) and Sered stepiv (Among the Steppes, 1903).

In addition to novels, Myrny also became the author of numerous short stories, some of which were dedicated to his views on future development of human society. Notable examples include the Tale of Right and Wrong (Казка про Правду та Кривду, 1883) and Dream (Сон, 1905), which contrast dystopian and utopian topics, engaging with the problems of economic and political power, social conflict and human quest for personal freedom. Inspired by Ukrainian folklore, Biblical stories and Baroque aesthetics, Myrny created the mystery drama Temptation (Спокуса). Some of Myrny's texts express manichaean ideas about duality of human nature, and also contain existentialist elements.

== Personal life ==
One of Myrny's ancestors was a member of the retinue of Vakhtang VI, King of Kartli, who emigrated to Ukraine in 1724.

Myrny was married to Alexandra Scheidemann, sister of Russian officer Eugen Scheidemann, who represented Poltava Governorate at the State Duma.

== Sources ==
- Encyclopedia of Ukraine
