= Pisky, Myrhorod Raion, Poltava Oblast =

Rural locality in Poltava Oblast, Ukraine

Pisky Піски
- Village
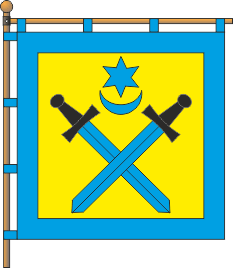
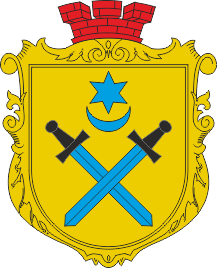
- Flag Coat of arms

- Location of Pisky within Ukraine
- Coordinates: 50°22′32″N 33°26′54″E
- Country: Ukraine
- Oblast: Poltava Oblast
- District: Myrhorod Raion
- Elevation: 105 m (344 ft)

Population
  - Total: 2,230
- Time zone: UTC+2 (EET)
  - Summer (DST): UTC+3 (EEST)
- Postal code: 37233
- Area code: +380 5356

Pisky (Ukrainian: Піски) is a village in Myrhorod Raion (district) in Poltava Oblast. It belongs to Zavodske urban hromada, one of the hromadas of Ukraine.

== History ==
The village was previously named "Пєсочень" ("Sandbox" in Ukrainian) and its first recorded mention was in 1092.

Pisky was previously located in Lokhvytsia Raion. The raion was abolished and its territory was merged into Myrhorod Raion on 18 July 2020 as part of the administrative reform of Ukraine, which reduced the number of raions of Poltava Oblast to four.
