= Ivan Rudchenko =

Ivan Bilyk

Ivan Yakovych Rudchenko (Ukrainian: Іван Якович Рудченко; 2 February 1845 – 14 November 1905) was a Ukrainian writer, ethnographer and literary critic. He is best known as an author of the novel Do Oxen Low When Mangers are Full?, written together with his brother Panas Myrny under the pen name Ivan Bilyk.

== Biography ==
Born in Myrhorod, Rudchenko stemmed from the family of a state official of Cossack ancestry. After graduating from a primary school in Hadiach, from the age of 14 he worked at the local treasury department. In 1863 he moved to Poltava, but next year left service and went to Kyiv in order to study at the local university. However, lack of funds forced him to leave the city and settle in Zhytomyr. As a young man, Rudchenko was involved in gathering of ethnographic material, which he sent to the Osnova magazine. In 1866–1867, he cooperated with Kievlyanin newspaper, where some of his ethnographic studies were printed.

Starting from 1867, his poems, translations and critical articles were published in the Lviv journal Pravda. Rudchenko also cooperated with the journals Vestnik Evropy and Kievskaya Starina. After returning into state service, Rudchenko made a career at the governorate control commission in Zhytomyr, later being transferred to Kyiv. Having spent some time working as an official in Vitebsk and Kherson, he eventually became a council member at the Ministry of Finance in Saint Petersburg. After 1880, Rudchenko ceased his activities in Ukrainian circles and reportedly developed a hostile attitude to the Ukrainian movement. He died in 1905 in Kyiv.

== Literary career ==
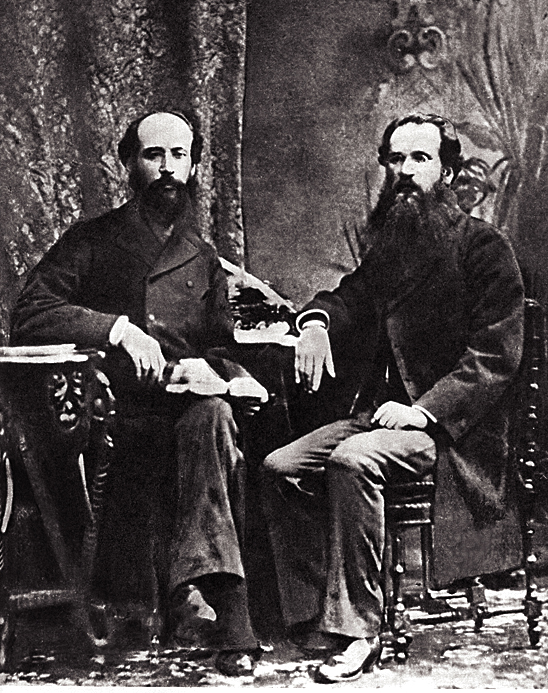
Ivan Bilyk (right) and Panas Myrny in 1881

Along with the pen name Ivan Bilyk, Rudchenko would publish some of his works under the pseudonyms Ivan Kyvaiholova, Ivan Ruina and Ivan Yakovenko.

=== Critic ===
As a litetrary critic, Bilyk was influenced by ideas of Belinsky, Chernyshevsky and Drahomanov, which made him adopt a sociological approach to literature. He saw the future of Ukrainian literature in social-democratic realism. Bilyk highly valued works of Russian literature, going on to translate some texts by Ivan Turgenev.

=== Author ===
Bilyk's few own works demonstrate the influence of Taras Shevchenko in terms of both form and ideology. Many of his poems remained unpublished and have been preserved only in handwritten form. Bilyk's participation in the writing of Do Oxen Low When Mangers are Full? was limited to a few chapters of the book, although he also advised his brother during the creative process; those advices were eventually published in the preface to the novel's original edition and promoted the positions of critical realism. In addition, Bilyk became the author of several children's school books, which were published by the Prosvita society in Lviv.

=== Translator ===
Bilyk translated works by Byron, Heine, Mickiewicz, Turgenev and other authors into Ukrainian language.

== Publications ==
=== As editor ===
- Popular South-Russian Tales (Народныя южно-русскія сказки, in 2 volumes, 1869–70)
- Chumak Folk Songs (Чумацкія народныя пЂсни, 1874)

=== As author ===
- Do Oxen Low When Mangers are Full? (1880, co-authored with Panas Myrny)
