= Maria (Ukrainian novel) =

1934 novel by Ulas Samchuk

Maria: A Chronicle of a Life
- Author: Ulas Samchuk
- Original title: Марія: хроніка одного життя : роман
- Translator: Roma Franko
- Genre: historical novel
- Publication date: 1934
- English publication date: 2011
- ISBN: 978-0-9877750-0-9 English translation

Maria (Ukrainian: Марія) is a 1934 historical novel by the Ukrainian author Ulas Samchuk. The novel, dedicated "to the mothers who died of hunger in Ukraine in 1932–33", follows the life of a village woman, Maria, between the 1861 emancipation of serfs to the 1932–33 Holodomor. Maria, the first work of fiction to treat the Ukrainian famine, has been included in post-1991 Ukrainian school curricula.

The book is organised into three parts: A Book about the Birth of Maria, A Book of Maria's Days, and A Book about Bread. Orphaned at the age of six, Maria is illiterate and forced into work when young. Her first three children die of infectious disease. Her son Maksym, before his murder by his father, is a poor farmer who evicts his parents, denounces his brother, and watches his sister starve. Maksym "combines many features of the Holodomor perpetrator: a quisling, communist, profiteer, sadist and Russian-speaking". Behind Maksym, as the 'Other' bearing ultimate responsibility for the famine, lies the Soviet state centered in Moscow. "Our country has not known such a Tsar-like plundering", exclaims one tortured character.

== Significance ==
The novel covers the history of a Ukrainian village from the time serfs were liberated from white slavery to the genocide of the starving times. It is considered critical to Ukrainian cultural identity. It is part of a larger body of fiction about the Holodomor written for readers of all ages.

== See also ==
- Samchuk, Ulas (2011). Cipwynk, Paul (ed.). Maria: A Chronicle of a Life. Translated by Franko, Roma. Language Lanterns Publications Inc. ISBN 978-0-9877750-0-9.
- Samchuk, Ulas (January 10, 2020). Марія (YouTube audiobook) (Video) (in Ukrainian). Archived from the original on 2025-09-25.
