= Famine-33 =

Famine-33 Голод-33
- Film poster
- Directed by: Oles Yanchuk
- Written by: Serhiy Dyachenko; Les Taniuk
- Produced by: Oleksiy Chernishov
- Cinematography: Vasyl Borodin; Mykhailo Kretov
- Music by: Viktor Patsukevych; Mykola Kolondionok
- Distributed by: Dovzhenko Film Studios
- Release dates: 1991 (Ukraine, Soviet Union)
- Running time: 90 minutes
- Languages: Ukrainian, Russian

Famine-33 (Ukrainian: «Голод-33», romanized: Holod-33) is a 1991 Soviet drama film by Oles Yanchuk about the Holodomor famine in Ukraine, and based on the novel The Yellow Prince by Vasyl Barka. The film is told through the lives of the Katrannyk family of six. The film was made on a voluntary basis. The main producer of the film was the Transcarpathian bank "Lisbank", which was to receive a share of rental income. However, after watching the finished film, the producers were so moved that they decided to refuse to return the money, and insisted that as many people as possible see the film.

== Synopsis ==
Following the Ukrainian Civil War, the Ukrainian People's Army was defeated, and Ukraine was incorporated into the Soviet Union. When Stalin rose to power in the late 1920s, the Communist Party imposed control over society and politics through systematic terror, targeting the peasantry first. Persistent peasant uprisings against the Bolsheviks in Ukraine posed a threat to the Communist regime. At the same time, Stalin struggled to repay foreign loans for industrialization projects under the First Five-Year Plan.

In 1932, a decree led to the deaths of millions: despite a fruitful harvest, authorities seized all crops, reserves, and even livestock through forced collectivization. Once deprived of food, people scavenged fields for leftover seeds, but the "Law of the Three Spikelets" imposed execution for anyone caught taking even the smallest amount. Starving Ukrainians resorted to eating weeds, mice, and eventually cases of cannibalism emerged in the villages. At the heart of the story is the Katran family, labeled "kulaks"—a father, his wife, children, and elderly mother, who is the first to die from the man-made famine. One by one, the children succumb, leaving only one surviving child, through whose eyes the audience witnesses the Red Army starving Ukraine into submission.

== Cast ==
- Halyna Sulyma as Dariya Katrannyk
- Heorhiy Moroziuk as Myron Katrannyk
- Oleksiy Horbunov as Bilshovyk
- Maksym Koval
- Olenka Kovtun
- Kostyantyn Kazymirenko
- Neonila Svitlychna
- Leonid Yanovsky
- Petro Beniuk
- Leo Okrent — episode
- Oleh Isayev
- Tetiana Slobidska
- Svetlana Romashko
- Larysa Kadyrova
- Alidzhan Soluyan
- Ivan Bondar — an episode
- С. Gordienko — episode
- Oleksandr Dubovych — episode
- Yuriy Dubrovin — episode
- Maksym Kondratiuk — episode
- Natalia Kononova — episode
- Myroslav Makoviychuk — episode
- Ihor Slobidskyi — episode
- Olena Yanchuk — episode

== Awards ==
1991 — 1st All-Ukrainian Film Festival in Kyiv — Main Prize.

2009 — the main prize of the Vincennes Film Festival — the Henri Langlois Prize.

== Facts ==
The film was made on a voluntary basis. The main producer of the film was the Transcarpathian bank Lisbank, which was supposed to receive a share of the profits from the distribution. However, after watching the finished film, the producers were so moved that they decided to refuse to return the money and insisted that as many people as possible see the film.

The film was broadcast on television on the UT-1 channel on the eve of the All-Ukrainian referendum on December 1, 1991, which resulted in Ukraine's independence.

The voice-over at the end of the film "Children, it's the last hour! For you have heard that the antichrist is coming, and now many antichrists have arisen... They came out of us, but they did not belong to us" - a quote from the Bible (John 2:18-19)

== See also ==
- The Undefeated (2000 film)
- The Guide (film)
- Bitter Harvest (2017 film)
- 1921–1923 famine in Ukraine
- Holodomor (1932–1933 human-made famine in Soviet Ukraine)
