= Ukrainian referendum, 1991 =

The Ukrainian referendum, 1991 can refer to either the:

- 1991 Ukrainian sovereignty referendum
- 1991 Ukrainian independence referendum
