= Ulas Samchuk =

Ukrainian writer and journalist (1905–1987)

- Улас Самчук
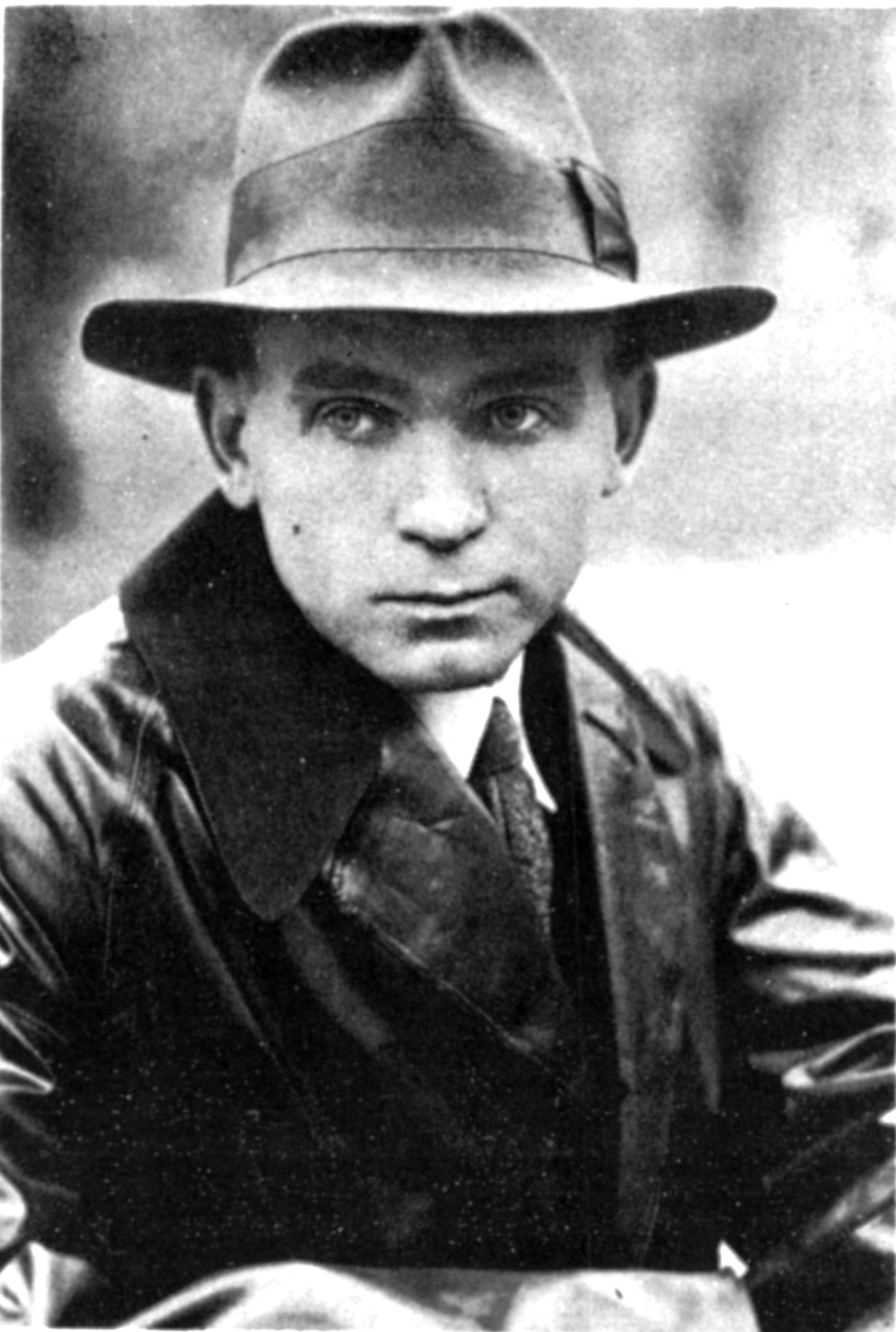
- Samchuk in c. 1937
- Born: 20 February [O.S. 7 February] 1905; Derman, Volhynian Governorate, Russian Empire (now Ukraine)
- Died: 9 July 1987 (aged 82); Toronto, Ontario, Canada
- Resting place: St. Volodymyr Ukrainian Cemetery
- Occupations: Writer; publicist; journalist
- Organization(s): Organization of Ukrainian Nationalists; Ukrainian Military Organization; Government of the Ukrainian People's Republic in exile Slovo Association of Ukrainian Writers in Exile
- Writing career
- Pen name: Danilchenko, V. Danilchuk, Perebendya, A. Ofirenko, Ivan Vlodko, Olga Volynyanka, Kai, F. Grak
- Notable work: Maria (1934)

Ulas Oleksiiovych Samchuk (Ukrainian: Улас Олексійович Самчук; 20 February [O.S. 7 February] 1905 – 9 July 1987) was a Ukrainian writer, publicist, journalist, Nationalist and proponent of Ukrainian independence. A member of the far-right Organization of Ukrainian Nationalists and the paramilitary Ukrainian Military Organization, Samchuk was a Nazi collaborator, propagandist and noted antisemite. Samchuk remains a controversial figure.

== Biography ==
Samchuk was born on 20 February [O.S. 7 February] 1905 in the selo of Derman, Volhynian Governorate (present-day Derman Druha, Ukraine). From 1917 to 1920 he studied at a four-grade elementary school in Derman. In 1921–1925 he studied at the Kremenets Ukrainian private gymnasium. Before he finished his secondary education, he was called up for service in the Polish Army in 1927, and later deserted in August of that year, escaping to Germany. In Germany he worked delivering coal, and with the help of a supportive German family, Samchuk continued his studies at the University of Breslau.

In 1929, Samchuk moved to Prague, Czechoslovakia. He was attracted by the city's vibrant Ukrainian community and the Ukrainian Free University in which he enrolled, and where he graduated in 1931.

In 1932, while in Prague, Samchuk first heard about the Holodomor famine, and traveled back into Soviet Ukraine to witness the event firsthand. In response, Samchuk wrote the novel Maria (1934), the first literary work about the famine, and village life at the time. In 1937, on the initiative of Yevhen Konovalets, a cultural office of the Ukrainian nationalist leadership headed by Oleh Olzhych was established. Prague became the centre of the Cultural Office, and one of the main institutions was the Section of artists, writers and journalists, chaired by Samchuk.

While Samchuks pre-war works did not appear antisemitic, to the contrary, they had described a childhood with close Jewish friends. During the war period his writings would go in the opposite direction, and would praise Hitler and call for support of the German army, while urging support to fight the "Judeo–Bolshevist" regime of the USSR, also espousing the ethnic cleansing of Ukraine. He wrote: "Where the Ukrainian state will be built, there will be no Jews there."

In 1941 he returned to Volyn as a member of the Organization of Ukrainian Nationalists. During 1941–1942, he worked for the Nazis within the Reichskommissariat Ukraine, as chief editor of the pro-Nazi newspaper Volyn. During this time, he wrote of the Babi Yar massacre “Today is a great day for Kyiv, the German authorities met the passionate desires of Ukrainians, ordering all Jews, of which there are still 150,000 remaining, to leave Kyiv.”

On September 1, 1941, shortly before the Babi Yar massacres Samchuk wrote on page 2 of Volyn: “The element that settled our cities, whether it is Jews or Poles who were brought here from outside Ukraine, must disappear completely from our cities. The Jewish problem is already in the process of being solved.”

Later that month, in the article "Zavoiovuimo misto" (Let's conquer the City) Samchuk added the following: “All elements that reside in our land, whether they are Jews or Poles, must be eradicated. We are at this very moment resolving the Jewish question, and this resolution is part of the plan for the Reich’s total reorganization of Europe.” "The empty space that will be created, must immediately and irrevocable be filled by the real owners and masters of this land, the Ukrainian people"

The Jewish Bolshevism theme would run throughout his articles during the war period. As an example on 30 November 1941, he wrote on witnessing the aftermath of destruction in Ternopil, caused during fighting between soviet partisan and Nazi forces, "All this occurred because of the will of the sons of Israel, who could find no better way of saving their native Soviet Union then by setting fire to the town as soon as the German army entered."

He remained the chief editor of Volyn until March 1942. In February 1942, after Nazi authorities implemented stricter media censorship regarding Ukrainian independence. In Volyn's 22 March 1942 issue, Samchuk penned an emotional editorial article titled "Tak bulo – Tak bude" (This is how it was – That is how it will be) that espoused Ukrainian independence. This resulted in his arrest and imprisonment by the Gestapo. He was released about one month later, and then began working for the Allgemeiner Deutscher Nachrichtendienst.

With Soviet forces approaching Galicia, Samchuk feared the repercussions of being a Nazi collaborator. He fled to Nazi Germany in 1944, where he founded and headed the literary-artistic organization MUR.

In 1948, he emigrated to Canada, where he became the leader of the Slovo Association of Ukrainian Writers in Exile. During this time, he published several books and regularly contributed articles to the Ukrainian Quarterly. During this time, his work began to depict Jewish characters in a more positive light than his earlier works. Some scholars claim that these later works area form of "expiation and atonement". Most notably, Samchuk's 1959 novel What Fire Does Not Heal (Choho ne hoit ohon)', has been called an "act of repentance".

Samchuk died in Toronto on 9 July 1987 and is buried at the St. Volodymyr Ukrainian Cemetery in Oakville, Ontario.

== Work ==
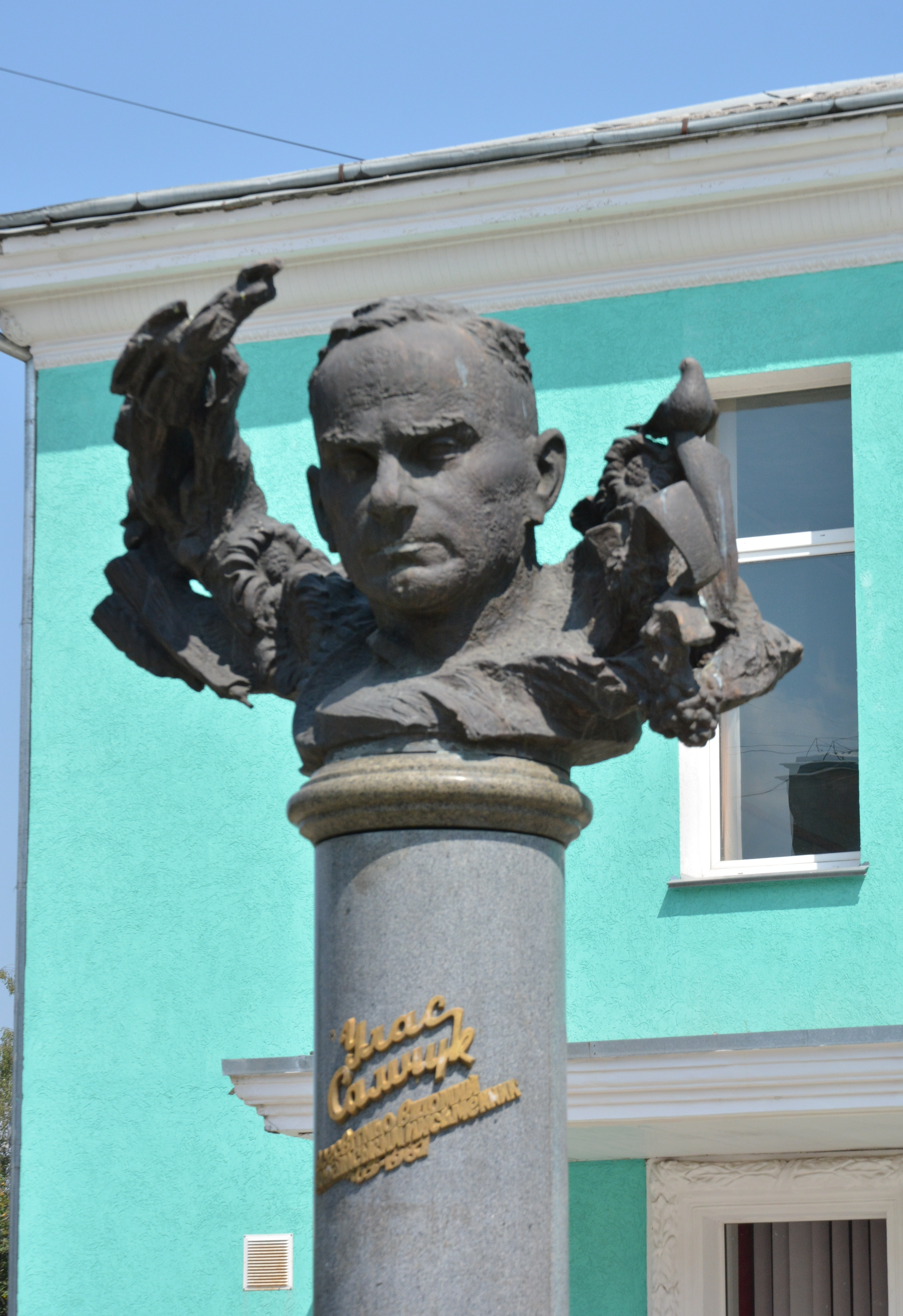
Monument to Ulas Samchuk in Zdolbuniv

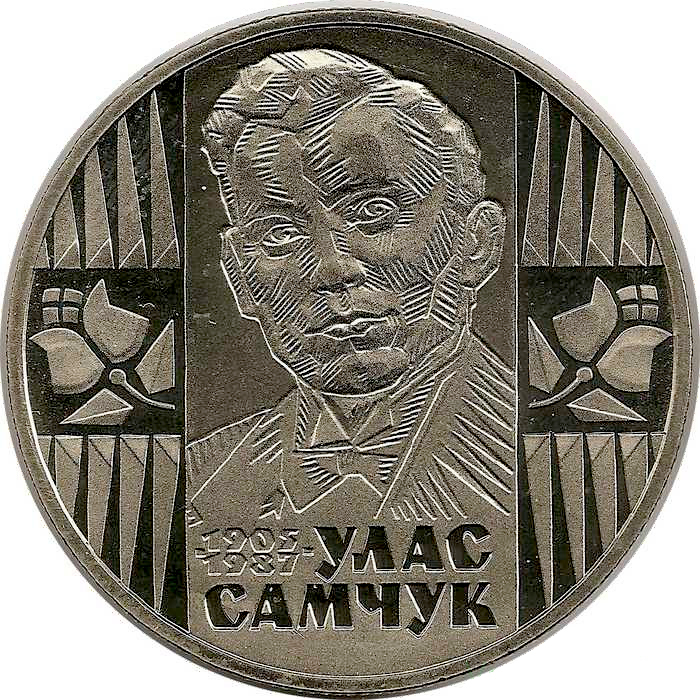
Ukrainian coin commemorating Ulas Samchuk (reverse)

Samchuk published his first short story, "On Old Paths", in 1926 in the Warsaw magazine Nasha Besida. Samchuk's Volyn trilogy (I–III, 1932–1937) portrays a collective image of a Ukrainian young man of the late 1920s and early 1930s. This archetypal young man seeks to find Ukraine's place in the world.

Beginning in 1929, he began to collaborate regularly with magazines based across several European cities. These included the Lviv-based Literary-Scientific Bulletin and The Bells, Chernivtsi-based The Independent Thought, Berlin-based Nation-Building, and Antimony, whose publication location changed.

Samchuk concurrently wrote the novel Kulak (1932) about the eternal commitment of the Ukrainian peasant to tilling the land and the undying optimism of farmers. His next important work was the two-volume novel The Mountains Speak (1934) which explored Carpatho-Ukraine's struggle against Hungary.

In 1947 he completed the play Noise of the Mill. His unfinished trilogy Ost: Frost Farm (1948) and Darkness (1957) depicted the Ukrainian man and his role in the unusual and tragic conditions of interwar and modern sub-Soviet reality.

Several of Samchuk's post-war novels depicted the struggle of the Ukrainian Insurgent Army in Volhynia and the life of Ukrainian emigrants in Canada. His best-known novel about the Ukrainian Insurgent Army in Volhynia was What Fire Does Not Heal (1959), and his best-known novel about the Ukrainian-Canadian experience was On Hard Land, (1967). His memoirs Five After Twelve (1954) and On a White Horse (1956) describe his experiences during World War II.

== Legacy ==
A street was named in honor of Samchuk in the Holosiivskyi district of Kyiv in April 2023.

== Works ==
- Volyn (1932–1937, 1941-1942)
- Kulak (1932)
- Mountains Are Talking [Hory hovoriat] (1934)
- Where the River Flows [Kudy teche richka?] (1934)
- Maria (1934), (English translation, Maria. A Chronicle of a Life 1952)
- Youth of Vasyl Sheremeta (1946–1947)
- Moroz's Khutir [Moroziv khutir] (1948)
- Darkness [Temnota] (1957)
- Escape from oneself [Vtecha vid sebe]
- People or Servants? [Liudy chy chern]
- Five After Twelve [Pyat po dvanadtsiatiy] (1954)
- On a White Horse [Na bilomu koni] (1956)
- On a Black Horse [Na koni voronomu] (1975)
- What Fire Does Not Heal [Choho ne hoit ohon] (1959)
- On Solid Earth [Na tverdiy zemli] (1967)
- In the Footsteps of Pioneers: The Saga of Ukrainian America (1979)

== Bibliography ==
- Ułas Samczuk, Wołyń, wyd. 2 (reprint), ISBN 83-88863-14-2 Biały Dunajec — Ostróg 2005, wyd. «Wołanie z Wołynia»
- Самчук У. Гори говорять. — К., 1996.
- Самчук У. Волинь: У 2 т. — К.: Дніпро, 1993. — Т.1, 2.
- Самчук У. Дермань. Роман: У 2 ч. — Рівне: Волинські обереги, 2005. — 120 с.
- Самчук У. На білому коні. — Львів: Літопис Червоної Калини, 1999.
- Самчук У. На коні вороному. — Львів: Літопис Червоної Калини, 2000.
- Самчук У. Темнота. Роман. — Нью-Йорк, 1957. — 493 с.
- Самчук У. Чого не гоїть огонь. — К.: Укр. письменник, 1994.
- Самчук У. Юність Василя Шеремети: Роман. — Рівне: Волин. обереги, 2005. — 329 с.
- Волинські дороги Уласа Сачука: Збірник. — Рівне: Азалія, 1993.
- Гром'як Р. Розпросторення духовного світу Уласа Самчука (Від трилогії «Волинь» до трилогії «Ost») // Орієнтації. Розмисли. Дискурси. 1997—2007. — Тернопіль: Джура, 2007. — С. 248—267.
- Улас Самчук. Ювілейний збірник. До 90-річчя народження. — Рівне: Азалія, 1994. 274
- Тарнавський О. Улас Самчук — прозаїк // Відоме й позавідоме. — К.: Час, 1999. — С. 336—350.
- Ткачук М. П. Художні виміри творчості Уласа Самчука // Українська мова і література в школі. — 2005. — № 6: — С. 43–47.
