= Vasyl Barka =

Ukrainian poet, writer, literary critic, and translator

Vasyl Ocheret
- Василь Очерет
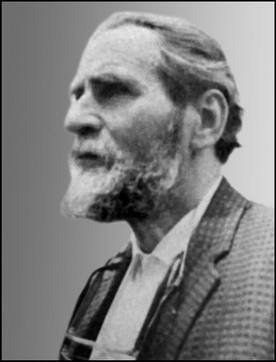
- Born: July 16, 1908; Solonytsia, Lubny Uyezd, Poltava Governorate, Russian Empire
- Died: April 11, 2003 (aged 94); Glen Spey, Sullivan County, New York, US
- Resting place: St Andrew's Cemetery, South Bound Brook, New Jersey, US
- Citizenship: Russia; Ukraine; Soviet Union; United States
- Occupations: Writer; Poet; Translator
- Writing career
- Pen name: Vasyl Barka (Ukrainian: Василь Барка; Ivan Vershyna (Іван Вершина
- Notable work: Zhovtyi kniaz

Vasyl Barka (Ukrainian: Василь Барка; real name — Vasyl Kostiantynovych Ocheret (Василь Костянтинович Очерет), another pseudo — Ivan Vershyna (Іван Вершина); 16 July 1908, Solonytsia– 11 April 2003, Glen Spey) was an American-residing Ukrainian poet, writer, literary critic, and translator.

== Biography ==
Vasyl Barka's family had a Cossack origin. In 1927, Barka graduated from Lubny Pedagogical College, and then worked as a teacher in a mining village in Donbas. There he did not get along with the local authorities, and went to the North Caucasus. In 1928, he entered the philology faculty of Krasnodar Pedagogical Institute and worked at the Krasnodar Art Museum. Supported by Pavlo Tychyna, Barka's work first appeared in print in 1929. The publication of his first book of poems in 1930 provoked much ideological criticism, including accusations of "bourgeois nationalism" and "religious carry-overs". Barka transferred from Krasnodar Institute to the postgraduate school of the Moscow Pedagogical Institute, wrote his thesis on the realistic and the fantastic in the Divine Comedy by Dante, and presented the thesis in 1940. He lectured at the Philology faculty at Rostov University.

In 1941, after the II World War broke out, Barka volunteered to join the people's militia, and in 1942 he was badly injured and caught in the occupation. After he recovered, he worked as a proofreader at a newspaper. In 1943, he was sent to Germany. After that, he lived in Germany, where he was active in the MUR literary association. In 1947, he moved to France, then, in 1950 to the United States. There he worked at Radio Liberty. Sometimes he was starving, and had to take any job: he worked as a fireman, a window cleaner, etc.

=== Works ===
Vasyl Barka was close to the New York group of Ukrainian poets. Barka's orphic works require intuitive rather than logical comprehension. His poetry developed and grew in stature, from the early lyrical collections to the monumental 4,000-strophe epic novel in verse, The Witness for the Sun of Seraphims, 1981. It addressed the theme of reconciliation between man and the Creator. His first novel, Rai (Paradise, 1953), deals with the Soviet 'paradise.' His second novel, Zhovtyi kniaz' (The Yellow Prince, 1963), about the Ukrainian Famine-Genocide of 1932–33, was translated into French (Paris 1981) and served as the basis for Oles Yanchuk's 1993 Ukrainian feature film Holod-33 (Famine-33).

Partial list of works:

- Pathways (1930, poetry)
- Workshops (1932, poetry)
- Apostles (1946, poetry)
- God's Earth (1947, poetry)
- Paradise (1953, novel)
- The lark's springs (1956, essays)
- The rose novel (1957, poetry)
- Psalm of the dove field (1958, poetry)
- Ocean (1959, poetry)
- True Poet (1961, essay on the works of Taras Shevchenko)
- Zhovtyi kniaz (The Yellow Prince) (1963, novel about the Holodomor in Ukraine, published in Ukraine in 1991)
- Sky rider (1965, religious and philosophical essays)
- Lіryst (1968, poetry)
- Creativity (1968, essays)
- Judgment Step (1992, poem)
- Caucasus (1993, a dramatic poem)

== Recognition ==
The novel Yellow Prince was twice nominated for the Nobel Prize. The novel is published in Ukraine in the School Library series, and is studied in schools. The novel was the basis for the 1991 film, Holod-33 (Eng. Famine-33), directed by Oles Yanchuk. In the Ukrainian National Opera, in 2008, the director Andriy Zholdak staged the play Lenin Love, Stalin Love based on Yellow Prince. In 1981, Vasyl Barka was awarded the inaugural Antonovych prize.
