= Ihor Rymaruk =

Ukrainian poet and editor (1958–2008)

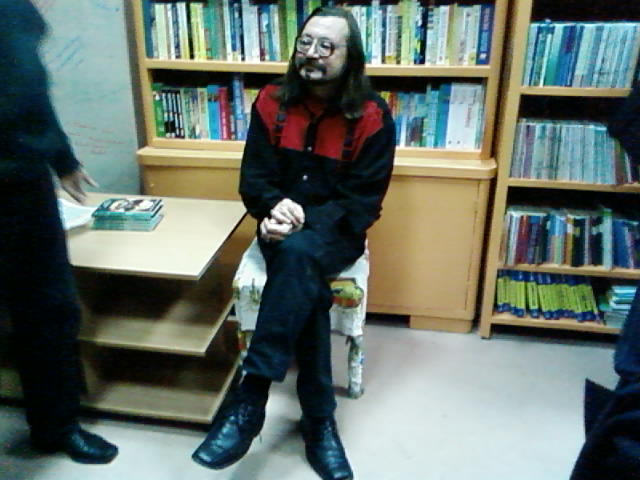
- Native name: Ігор Римарук
- Born: 4 July 1958; Miakoty, Ukrainian SSR, Soviet Union
- Died: 3 October 2008 (aged 50); Lviv, Ukraine
- Occupation: Poet, editor
- Language: Ukrainian
- Notable awards: Boychenko prize (1988), Bulayenko prize (1991), Book of the Year (2000), Shevchenko National Prize (2002)
- Spouses: Olha Unhuryan, Halyna Stefanova; Iren Rozdobudko; Larysa Andriyevska

Signature
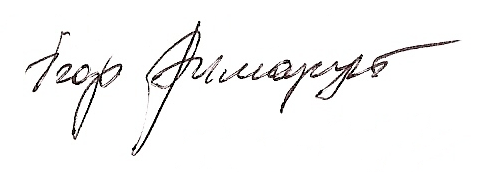

Ihor Mykolayovych Rymaruk (Ukrainian: І́гор Микола́йович Римару́к; 4 July 1958 – 3 October 2008) was a Ukrainian poet and editor.

== Biography ==
Ihor Rymaruk was the son of school teachers Mykola and Halyna Rymaruk. Rymaruk began writing poems while still at school. After graduating from school with a gold medal, he enrolled at the Taras Shevchenko National University of Kyiv, where he studied journalism and graduated with honors in 1979. In 1978 he made his debut in the Dnipro magazine, where he later became editorial director. From 1984 Rymaruk was a member of the National Writers' Union of Ukraine. In the same year his first volume of poetry, The High Water, was published. In 2002 he was awarded Shevchenko National Prize. In 2004 he became president of the Association of Ukrainian Writers. On October 3, 2008, Ihor Rymaruk died from a car accident. Three more volumes of his poetry were published posthumously.

== Poetry ==
Rymaruk's poems are characterized by the originality and richness of poetic images. He wrote both in the strict classical form, which is still widespread in Ukraine today, and in free verse. In doing so, he also applied the described criterion of responsibility to himself as an author. He saw himself as part of Ukrainian history and also placed his poems within a literary tradition. Both Yevhen Pluzhnyk and Yevhen Malanyuk were his role models. Rymaruk's poems also received notable recognition abroad: they were translated into many languages, including: English, Polish, Spanish, Romanian, Swedish and German. In these languages they were printed and published mainly in anthologies of Ukrainian literature. His volume of poetry “Diva Obyda” (2000), won the “Book of the Year” competition in the “Voice of the Soul” category.

== Editorship ==
Rymaruk worked as an editor at the News from Ukraine newspaper and at Molod and Dnipro (1991–1994) publishing houses. Rymaruk also worked as a chief editor of Suchasnist, which was the leading literary journal in Ukraine in 1990s.

In 1990, Rymaruk published the anthology The Eighties (Вісімдесятники), which brought together important authors of this generation who were unable to publish in the Brezhnev era. This Ukrainian 1980s generation, to which Rymaruk also belonged, turned against traditional forms in literature and oriented itself more towards European authors. This generation was also opposed to the previous Soviet generation of the Sixtiers and had a more hermetic and inward-looking poetic style.

== Books of poetry ==
- The High Water (Висока вода), 1984.
- During the Snowfall (Упродовж снігопаду), 1988.
- Voices of the Night (Нічні голоси), 1991.
- Golden Rain (Золотий дощ), German-Ukrainian Edition Poetry, Brodina, Reichelsheim, 1996.
- Virgin Obyda (Діва Обида), 2000, 2002.
- Bermuda Triangle (Бермудський трикутник), 2007.
- Tear of the Virgin (Сльоза Богородиці), 2009.
- Your good time (Твій добрий час), 2011.
- Divine Wind: Last Poems (Божественний вітер: останні вірші), 2012.

== Sources ==
- Римарук Ігор Миколайович
- Ігор Римарук мав чотири дружини
- 65 років від дня народження Римарука Ігоря Миколайовича
