= Hryhoriy Tiutiunnyk =

Ukrainian writer, poet (1920–1961)

- Григорій Тютюнник
- Born: Hryhoriy Tiutiunnyk; 23 April 1920; Poltava Governorate, Ukrainian SSR
- Died: 29 August 1961 (aged 41); Lviv, Ukrainian SSR, Soviet Union
- Occupations: poet, writer
- Writing career
- Notable awards: Shevchenko Prize (1963)

Hryhoriy Mykhailovych Tiutiunnyk (Ukrainian: Григорій Михайлович Тютюнник; 23 April 1920 – 29 August 1961) was a Ukrainian lyric poet, writer.

His brother was the writer Hryhir Tiutiunnyk.

Hryhoriy Tiutiunnyk began publishing in 1937. In 1938 he graduated from Zinkovskaya Secondary School and entered Kharkiv University, but stopped studying because of the war.

After World War II, Tiutiunnyk worked as a teacher in the selo Kamianka-Buzka of Lviv Oblast. From 1956, he worked for the Lviv magazine "Oktyabr".

The first story is "Miron Razbeigora" (published in 1950). In 1951 the first collection "Plowed Borders" of 10 short stories was published in Lviv. In 1952 the novel "A cloud will not obscure the sun" was published. In 1963 the novel-trilogy "Whirlpool" was published (in 1983 a feature film was made based on the novel). In 1963 Hryhoriy Tiutiunnyk was posthumously awarded the Taras Shevchenko National Prize.

After the writer's death, the poetry collection "Crane Keys" and the novel "Bug is noisy" were published.
