= Hryhir Tiutiunnyk =

Ukrainian writer

- Григір Михайлович Тютюнник
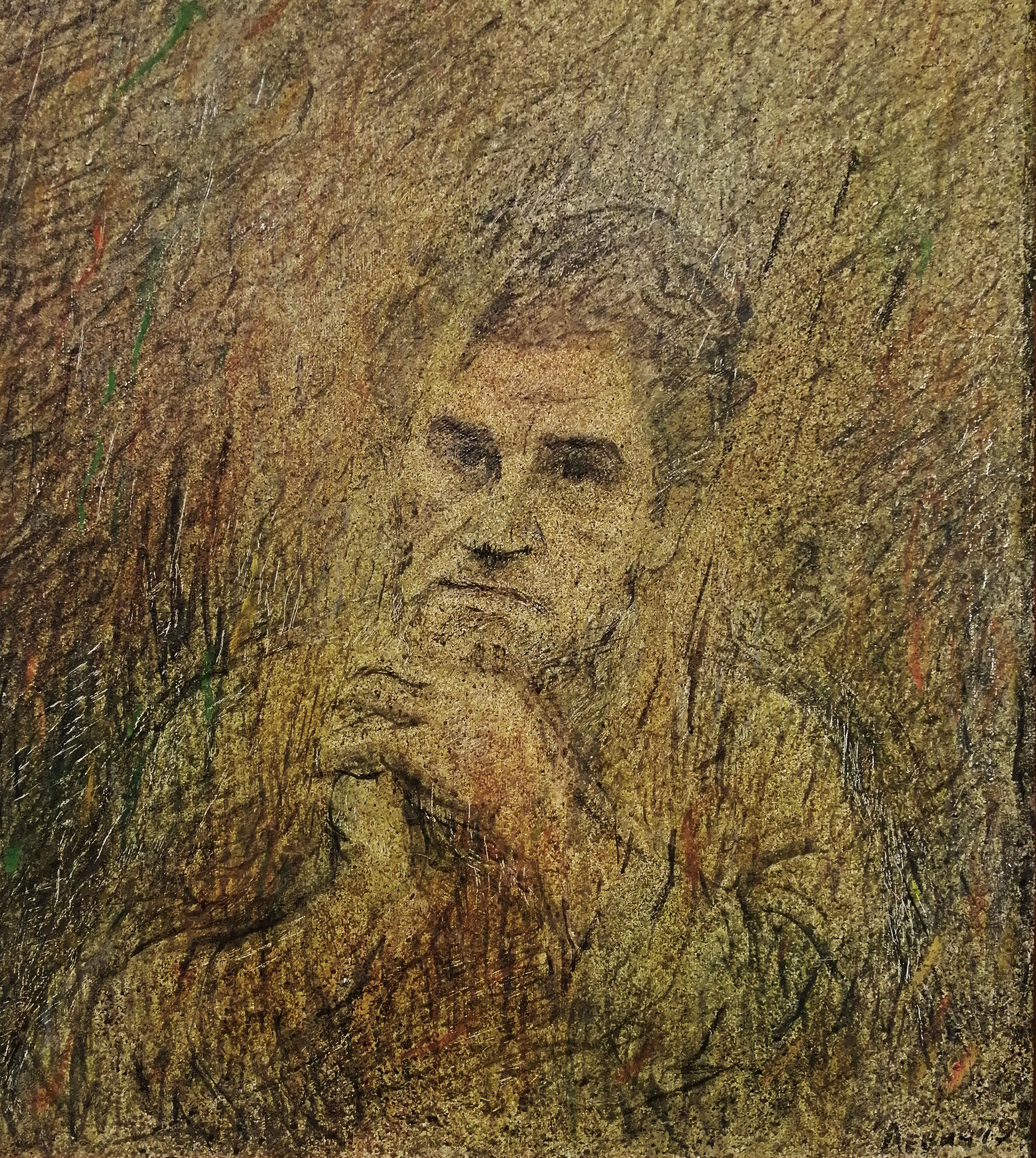
- A portrait painting of Tiutiunnyk dated to 1979.
- Born: December 5, 1931; Shilovka, Poltava Oblast, Ukrainian SSR, Soviet Union (now Ukraine)
- Died: March 6, 1980 (aged 48); Kyiv, Ukrainian SSR, Soviet Union (now Ukraine)
- Cause of death: Suicide
- Resting place: Baikove Cemetery
- Education: VN Karazin Kharkiv National University
- Occupation: Writer
- Relatives: Hryhoriy Tiutiunnyk
- Writing career
- Language: Russian language (1957-1961); Ukrainian language (1961-1980)
- Period: 1960s-1980
- Genre: Short stories
- Notable works: A Light Far in the Steppe; Three Cuckoos with a Bow
- Notable awards: Shevchenko National Prize
- Literary movement: Ukrainian rural prose

Hryhir Mykhaylovych Tiutiunnyk (Ukrainian: Григір Михайлович Тютюнник, 1931–1980) was a Ukrainian writer. He most extensively wrote in short stories, and is regarded as one of the most significant writers of twentieth-century Ukrainian literature. He was also the brother of Hryhoriy Tiutiunnyk. He is also considered a defining voice of the Sixtiers generation, a movement that reawakened literature in Ukraine and a sense of Ukrainian nationalism.

Tiutiunnyk was born in the village of Shilovka in Poltava Oblast, and during his childhood lived through the Holodomor, the Great Purge which led to his father's sentencing to the gulags and eventual execution, and World War II. These experiences would later shape his storywriting, as he extensively drew on his own life in his works. After living in Donetsk Oblast during his early years, he attended VN Karazin Kharkiv National University, which he graduated from in 1962. After graduating, he started his literary career. He was best known in his literary works for his psychological portrayals of ordinary rural Ukrainians, his refusal to conform to socialist realism, his use of extensive irony, and his frequent criticism of the Soviet government. His most notable works included "Three Cuckoos with a Bow," "Klymko," and "A Little Light Far in the Steppe," which are notable for their autobiographical foundations, their ethical foundations, and depictions of Soviet-era repression and its effects on individual lives and the Ukrainian national identity as a whole.

Tiutiunnyk was blacklisted from Soviet publishing houses during the 1972–1973 Ukrainian purge, although he continued to write until his death by suicide in Kyiv in 1980, which he blamed on the Soviet government for their control over his writings. He was posthumously awarded the Shevchenko National Prize in 1989 for his works.

== Early life ==
Tiutiunnyk was born on 5 December 1931 in the village of Shilovka, which was then part of Poltava Oblast in the Ukrainian SSR of the Soviet Union. He was the son of Mykhailo Vasylyovych (born 1897) and his second wife, Hanna Mykhailivna. He had one older brother, Hryhoriy, who was born a decade earlier to Mykhailo's first wife, a teacher named Ivha Fedotivna Budenna (originally Hryhoriy went under the name Heorhiy, but, according to a legend, his grandfather Feodot accidentally registered him under a false name after a night of drinking).

During the Holodomor from 1932–33, Hryhir's family greatly suffered, and he briefly stopped walking and speaking for a period of time. A few years later, during the Great Purge, his uncle, Pavlo, was arrested and executed in a prison in Poltava while Hryhir's own father was arrested by the NKVD for conducting "counter-revolutionary agitation" and was sentenced to ten years in the gulags. He was never informed of the death of his father in exile at Usollag in April 1943.

Following the sentencing of his father, he was taken by his mother to live with her brother, Filemon, in the village of Shchotove in the Donbas. He was initially sent to the Ukrainian first class, but it was disbanded shortly thereafter as it consisted of only several students. He was then sent to an exclusively-Russian speaking school for the rest of his secondary education. After fifth grade, he quit secondary school to attend the Zinkiv Craft School back in his native Poltava, when he received the specialty of a locksmith of the 5th category. He was also given some clothes and a ration of 700 grams of bread a day during his stay at the craft school during the famine of 1946-47.

== Early career ==
After graduating as a locksmith, he worked some odd jobs. First, he worked in Kharkiv at the Malyshev Factory, but his lungs soon came under stress and he fell ill and returned to Shchotove. Due to him not completing his mandatory three years at the plant in Kharkiv, as was standard, he was forced to serve 4 months in a colony before being allowed to work at the collective farm in the village and then at the mines near Debaltseve. He continued his streak of working odd jobs at the Myronivka Thermal Power Plant, then Mine No. 30, and finally as an auto mechanic at the mine construction unit of the Krasnolutska motor transport office. In November 1951, he decided to complete his mandatory service, and served for the next four years as a radio operator on the Pacific Fleet. While mobilized, he educated himself and was permitted to attend the Nakhodka Bay evening school and then the Vladivostok Evening School No. 1. In October 1955, he was also hired to work at the carriage depot in Schotove.

== University at Kharkiv ==
In 1957, he entered the VN Karazin Kharkiv National University, studying Russian philology at the university's Faculty of Philology. At the university, he first became interested in literary works, and in 1960 wrote his first short story entitled "At Dusk" in Russian, which was published in the magazine "Krestyanka" a year later in 1961. However, there are some older stories that have been discovered, such as "Beginners" which is dated to 1957, and published in the typewritten magazine "Enthusiast" in October 1958, alongside "The Apostate," which was published in December 1959. He almost never spoke of the two works, though, and while he had them printed in a book of memories, he did not include them in the definitive editions of his works. During his penultimate year before leaving the university, his elder brother, Hryhoriy, died in August. He decided to take up writing again, but this time in the Ukrainian language, following his brother's death. He first read Borys Hrinchenko's dictionary of the Ukrainian language, and then translated "At Dusk" into Ukrainian. As he later wrote, he said of this switch, "and since then I have never parted with [my native language], thank God, and will not part with it until my death." He graduated from the university in 1962, with his diploma thesis being on a psychological analysis of Leo Tolstoy.

== Later career ==
Following his graduation, he first worked as a teacher in Donetsk Oblast, before moving to Kyiv in 1963 to work in the editorial offices of the newspaper "Literaturna Ukraina". Over the following decades of his life, he would work in the script workshop of the Kyiv Film Studio named after Alexander Dovzhenko and in the publishing houses "Youth" and "Veselka". After completely devoting himself to solely his literary work, in 1966 he became a member of the Writers' Union of Ukraine. In 1968, in Nizhyn, Tiutiunnyk led a reading of "Medal", which was a story about a starving collective farm worker receiving a labour medal. This would have long-lasting consequences on Tiutiunnyk, as it was treated by party officials as anti-Soviet provocation. In 1969, alongside Ivan Chendei, he was extensively criticized in a Soviet newspaper for not incorporating socialist realism into his works and instead focusing on Ukrainian life and for the earlier Nizhyn incident. However, during the 1972–1973 Ukrainian purge, he was blacklisted from all publishing houses in the Soviet Union. His existing works were also subject to very strict censorship, which he extensively lamented about privately.

== Themes ==
Most of Tiutiunnyk's works were a reflection of his own life through characters, such as in "A Little Light Far in the Steppe" and "Three Cuckoos with a Bow". All touched on Soviet repression and his criticism of how Ukrainians were treated by the government, with a defining characteristic of his short stories being emotional depth. A frequent setting in his works was the rural post-World War II landscape of Ukraine, which he marked with material deprivation and fractured families. Also in extensive use in his stories is irony - which he explored in a full range from gentle humour to bitter sarcasm to tragic irony - which he used as a central artistic instrument. This was mostly due to what a scholar, Moroz, calls his care for ordinary Ukrainians while watching the Soviet system deform and diminish them, which Moroz argued made Tiutiunnyk feel irony. His contemporaries, such as Mochvan and Mushketyk, noted that irony was one of his most recognizable literary traits. He would extensively use irony as a survival strategy under censorship, writing political critique in forms that employed irony so that censors could not reform the works completely.

V.O. Kuzhmenko generally characterized Tiutiunnyk's style as "realistically psychological" with elements of impressionism, existentialism, and a look into irrational human behavior. Kuzhmenko attempted to describe him as such to push back against the common tendency to view Tiutiunnyk as a purely social realist or ethnographic chronicler, as is common, and instead focused on his philosophy.

== Works ==
Three Cuckoos with a Bow was a short story he published in 1976. It was one of his most charged workers. The father figure at the center of the story is Mykhailo, who was arrested and sent to a Siberian labour camp, mirroring Tiutiunnyk's own father, also named Mykhailo who was repressed. The story details absence, longing, and comments on human connections under a totalitarian system. The father in the story writes a letter from the camp, which is written in an anguished tone, that reflects Tiutiunnyk's own feelings about what he felt was taken from his generation by the Soviets - that is, to grieve openly. The story is also a reflection of the themes of ethical sensitivity and the refusal to cast people into roles or stark opinions that were present throughout most of Tiutiunnyk's works.

Later that year, he published the story "Klymko". The story, although fictional, draws on Tiutiunnyk's own experience walking from the Donbas back to Poltava Oblast through German-occupied territory in 1942 when he was 12. While it is not an autobiographical experience, it was mostly aimed at showing that ordinary people have a capacity for goodness, even under impossible conditions like occupation. "A Little Light Far in the Steppe" was published a few years later in 1979. Drawing on his own life, the protagonist, Pavlo, also has a difficult adolescence during World War II and attempts to practice emotional restraint even while in severe poverty like Tiutiunnyk did.

== Personal life and death ==
At the university in Kharkiv, he met his wife, Lyudmila Koretska, who was a student in the Ukrainian department. Together they had two children: Mikhail and Vasily.

In Hryhorii Avrakhov's memoirs, who was a friend of Tiutiunnyk, he was described as "tall, dark with an unruly forelock and an energy that commanded rooms." Avrakhov noted that while outwardly Tiutiunnyk seemed powerful, he was deeply fragile and vulnerable. Avrakhov and Tiutiunnyk's friendship was long-lasting after they first met at a "Literaturna Ukraina" editorial office in Cherkasy in 1964.

Feeling frustration over his ability to write in an atmosphere of bureaucratic control over his literature, he committed suicide on 6 March 1980 in his home in Kyiv. His final note wrote, "Torment someone else, and burn what belongs to me". Afterwords, he was buried at Baikove Cemetery in Kyiv.

== Awards and recognition ==
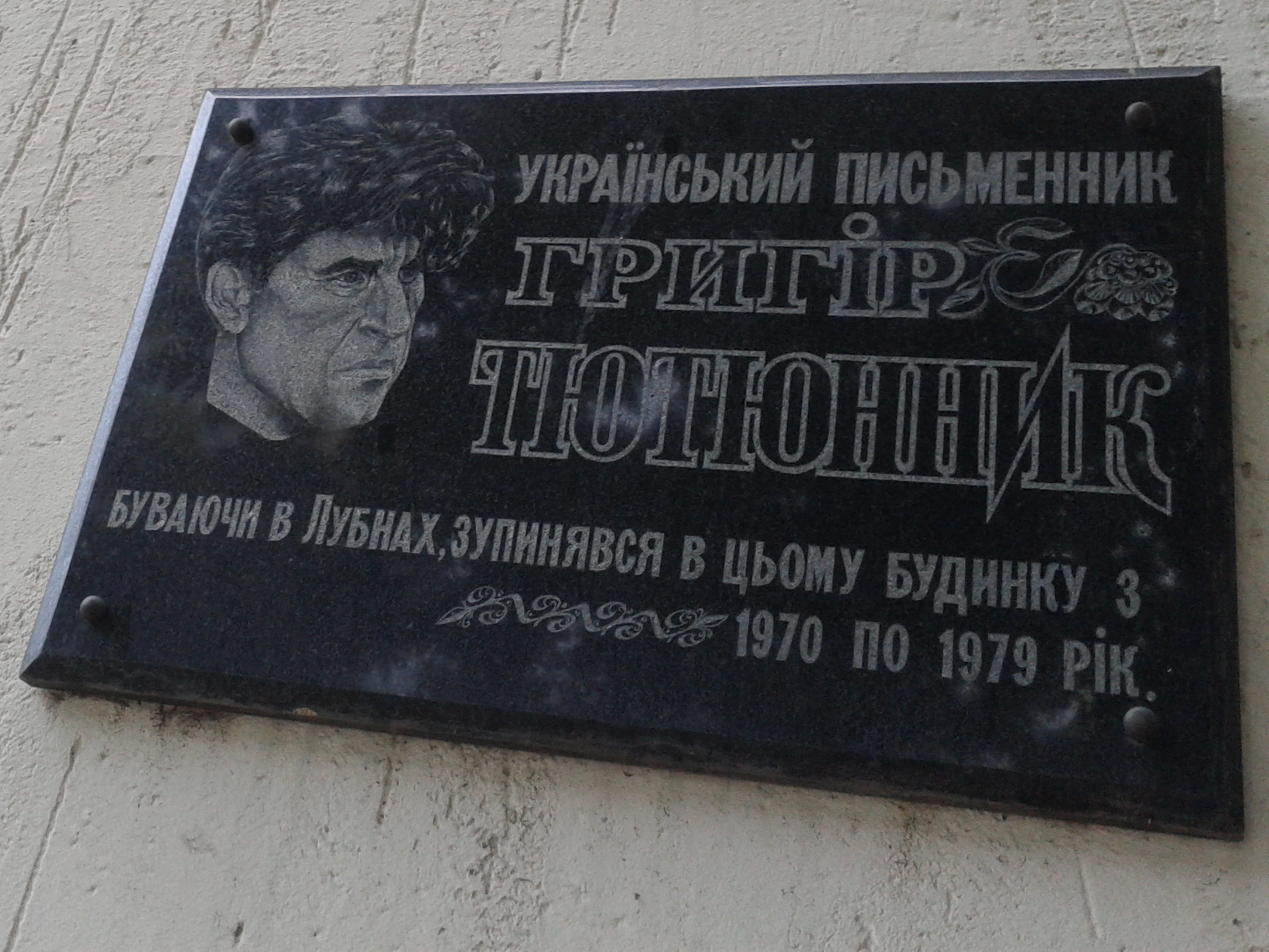
Memorial plaque to Tiutiunnyk in Lubny, Ukraine

There has been an extensive amount of memorials dedicated to Tiutiunnyk in Ukraine. At his grave in Baikove Cemetery, there is a bust of the writer on the high ceiling by sculptor V. Lutsak and architect Y. Kovbasa. There is also a literary-memorial homestead museum dedicated to him in the village of Verkhnia Manuilivka, Poltava Oblast, which is located at the home of his wife's family, where he wrote during his visits over the years. In 2021, a memorial plaque was installed there in his honour. Since the 2020s, the museum has been taken care of by his relatives, who have recreated his "green study", preserving manuscripts, writing tools, and personal items of his. Local journalists within the area have argued that even though the homestead is not officially recognized as a Ukrainian cultural heritage site, it should be and receive official museum status in order to ensure legal protections.

- 1980: Lesya Ukrainka Literary Prize of the Ukrainian SSR
- 1989: Shevchenko National Prize
- Memorial plaque on a house on Andriivskyi Descent St. in Kyiv

== Books ==
- Тютюнник Г. М. Зав'язь: Оповідання / Г. М. Тютюнник. – К.: Молодь, 1966. – 158 с.: іл.
- Тютюнник Г. М. Деревій: Повість та оповідання / Г. М. Тютюнник. – К.: Молодь, 1969. – 180 с.
- Тютюнник Г. М. Ласочка: Оповідання / Г. М. Тютюнник; Іл. Я. Левича. – К.: Веселка, 1970. – 20 с.
- Тютюнник Г. М. Лісова сторожка: Оповідання / Г. М. Тютюнник; Іл. Я. Левича. – К.: Веселка, 1971. – 29 с.: іл.
- Тютюнник Г. М. Батьківські пороги: Оповідання, спогади / Г. М. Тютюнник. – К.: Молодь, 1972. – 176 с.: іл.
- Тютюнник Г. М. Тысячелистник: Рассказы / Г. М. Тютюнник; Авториз. пер. с укр. Н. Дангуловой; Ил. Н. Т. Борисовой. – М.: Сов. писатель, 1972. – 216 с.: ил.
- Тютюнник Г. М. Степова казка: Оповідання: Для дошк. та мол. шк.. віку / Г. М. Тютюнник; Мал. Я. Левич. – К.: Веселка, 1973. – 24 с.
- Тютюнник Г. М. Лесная сторожка: Рассказы: [Для дошк. возраста] / Г. М. Тютюнник; Пер. с укр. Н. Шевченко. – М.: Дет. литература, 1974. – 48 с.: ил.
- Тютюнник Г. М. Однокрил: Оповідання / Г. М. Тютюнник. – К.: Веселка, 1974. –37 с.
- Тютюнник Г. М. Деревій / Г. М. Тютюнник; Перекл. Г. Райаметс та А. Яаксоо; Вступ. ст. П. Засенка. – Таллін: Періодика, 1974. – 92 с. (естонською мовою)
- Тютюнник Г. М. Крайнебо: Оповідання / Г. М. Тютюнник. – К.: Молодь, 1975. – 128 с.
- Тютюнник Г. М. Отчие пороги: Повесть и рассказы / Г. М. Тютюнник; Авториз. пер. с укр. Н. Дангуловой; Послесл. Б. Олейника; Худож. С. Соколов. – М.: Молодая гвардия, 1975. – 272 с.: ил.
- Тютюнник Г. М. Климко: Повість: [Для мол. шк.. віку] / Г. М. Тютюнник; Іл. В. Євдокименка. – К.: Веселка, 1976. – 87 с.: іл.
- Тютюнник Г. М. Коріння: Оповідання. Повість / Г. М. Тютюнник; Іл. І. М. Гаврилюка. – К.: Дніпро, 1978. – 294 с.: іл.
- Тютюнник Г. М. Вогник далеко в степу: Казка, оповідання, повісті: Для мол. шк.. віку / Г. М. Тютюнник; Худож. В. Євдокименка. – К.: Веселка, 1979. – 182 с.: іл.
- Тютюнник Г. М. Облога / Г. М. Тютюнник; Перекл. А. Богданський. – Варшава: Іскри, 1979. – 124 с. (in Polish)
- Тютюнник Г. М. В сутінки: Оповідання / Г. М. Тютюнник; Перекл. Р. Дворжакової-Жяранової, Ю. Андрійчик; Упоряд. та післямова Р. Жидліцького. – Кошіце: Східнослов. вид-во, 1979. – 279 с. (словацькою мовою)
- Тютюнник Г. М. Климко: Повесть / Г. М. Тютюнник; Пер. с укр. Н.Шевченко. – М.: Детская література, 1980. – 63 с.
- Тютюнник Г. М. Деревій: Оповідання і повісті / Г. М. Тютюнник; Упоряд., перекл., авторка передмови “Моряк із Шилівки” П. Аксенова. – Пловдів: Хр. Г. Данов, 1980. – 172 с. (in Bulgarian)
- Тютюнник Г. М. Климко: Казки, оповідання, повісті / Г. М. Тютюнник; Передм. М. Слабошпицького. Вічна загадка любові. – К.: Веселка, 1981. – 189 с.
- Тютюнник Г. М. Климко: Повість / Г. М. Тютюнник. – Вільнюс: Вага, 1981. – 87 с. (in Lithuanian)
- Тютюнник Г. М. Вибрані твори: Оповідання. Повісті / Г. М. Тютюнник; Передм. Б. Олійника. – К.: Дніпро, 1981. – 607 с.: портр.
- Тютюнник Г. М. Холодная мята: Повесть и рассказы / Г. М. Тютюнник; Авториз. пер. с укр. Н. Дангуловой; Худож. А. Соколов. – М.: Сов. писатель, 1981. – 335 с.: ил.
- Тютюнник Г. М. Холодная мята: Повесть. Рассказы / Г. М. Тютюнник; Авториз. пер. с укр. Н. Дангуловой; Послесл. В. Мельника; Худож. С. Хализов. – М.: Известия, 1981. – 379 с.: ил.
- Тютюнник Г. М. Степова казка / Г. М. Тютюнник. – К.: Веселка, 1982. – 32 с.
- Тютюнник Г. М. Климко: Повість / Г. М. Тютюнник; Пер. з укр. М. Дубенецького. – Мінськ: Юнацтва, 1982. – 63 с. (in Belarusian)
- Тютюнник Г. М. Климко: Повість / Г. М. Тютюнник; Пер. І. Колінько. – Берлін: Вид-во дит. літ., 1982. – 87 с. (in German)
- Тютюнник Г. М. Огонек далеко в степи: Рассказы и повести / Г. М. Тютюнник; Авториз. пер. с укр. Н. Дангуловой; Предисл. О. Гончара. – М.: Молодая гвардия, 1982. – 352 с.: ил.
- Тютюнник Г. М. Климко: Оповідання. Повісті / Г. М. Тютюнник; Худож. О. П. Никифоров. – К.: Рад. школа, 1984. – 272с.: іл.
- Тютюнник Г. М. Твори: У 2 кн. / Г. М. Тютюнник; Упоряд. А. Шевченко; Фот. В. Білоуса, Д. Чередниченка – К.: Молодь, 1984–1985. – Кн. 1: Оповідання / Передмова О. Гончар. Живописець правди. –1984. – 328 с., іл.; Кн. 2: Повісті / Післямова А. Шевченка Талант любові: Життєвий і творчий шлях Григорія Тютюнника. – 1985. – 328 с.: іл.
- Тютюнник Г. М. Ласочка: Оповідання / Г. М. Тютюнник. – К.: Веселка, 1987. – 14 с.
- Тютюнник Г. М. Огонек далеко в степи: Сказки, рассказы, повести / Г. М. Тютюнник; Пер. с укр. Н. Шевченко; Рис. В. Евдокименко. – К: Веселка, 1986. – 200 с.
- Тютюнник Г. М. Завязь: Повесть, рассказы / Г. М. Тютюнник; Авториз. пер. с укр. Н. Дангуловой; Худож. О. В. Бичко. – К.: Дніпро, 1988. – 335 с.: ил.
- Тютюнник Г. М. Климко: Повісті: Для мол. та серед. шк. віку / Г. М. Тютюнник; Худож. В. Савадов. – К.: Веселка, 1989. – 164 с.: кольор. іл.
- Тютюнник Г. М. Повести и рассказы / Авториз. пер. с укр. Н. Дангуловой. – М.: Сов. писатель, 1989. – 715 с.
- Тютюнник Г. М. Степова казка: Повісті, оповідання, казки: Для мол. та серед. шк. віку / Г. М. Тютюнник; Упоряд. Л. В. Тютюнник; Передм. “З вірою в любов і милосердя” М. Слабошпицького; Худож. В. Євдокименко. – К.: Веселка, 1989. – 300 с.: кольор. іл.
- Тютюнник Г. М. Тайна вечеря: Повісті й новели / Г. М. Тютюнник; Пер. з укр. В. Левицьки, Й. Георгіце та ін.; Передм. А. Шевченка. – Кишинів: Література артістіка, 1989. – 413 с. (in Moldovan)
- Тютюнник Г. М. Степова казка. Казки, оповідання, повісті: Для мол. та серед. шк. віку / Г. М. Тютюнник; Упоряд. Л. Тютюнник; Передм. М. Слабошпицького; Худож. В. Євдокименко. – 2-ге вид. – К.: Веселка, 1993. – 307 с.: іл., портр.
- Тютюнник Г. М. Климко: Повість: Для дітей середн. віку / Г. М. Тютюнник. – К.: Молодь, 1995. – 164 с.: іл.
- Тютюнник Г. М. Вибрані твори: Оповідання, повісті / Г. М. Тютюнник. – Дніпропетровськ: Січ, 2000. – 450 с.
- Тютюнник Г. М. Смерть кавалера: Повісті і оповідання / Г. М. Тютюнник; Передмова А. Шевченка. Щастя й злощастя Григора Тютюнника. – К.: Махаон, 2001. – 254 с.
- Тютюнник Г. М. Облога: Вибрані твори / Григір Тютюнник; Передм., упорядкув. та приміт. В. Дончика. – К.: Унів. вид-во ПУЛЬСАРИ, 2004. – 584 с.
- Тютюнник Григір. Облога: Вибрані твори / Григір Тютюнник; Передм., упорядкув. та приміт. В. Дончика. – 3-тє вид. – К.: Унів. вид-во ПУЛЬСАРИ, 2005. – 832 с.
