= List of Ukrainian-language writers =

Ukrainian-language writers
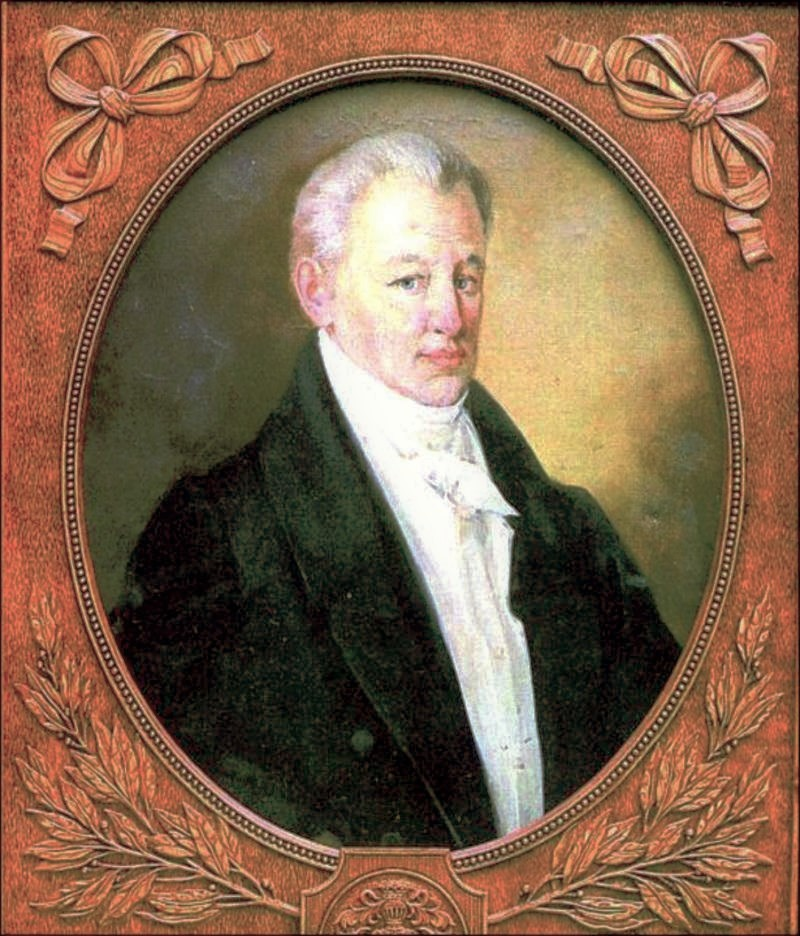
Kotliarevsky

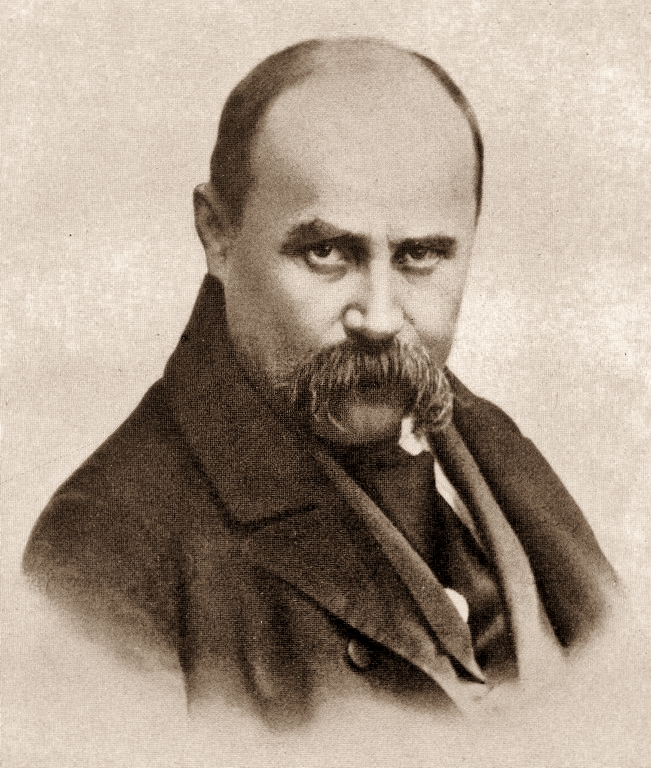
Shevchenko

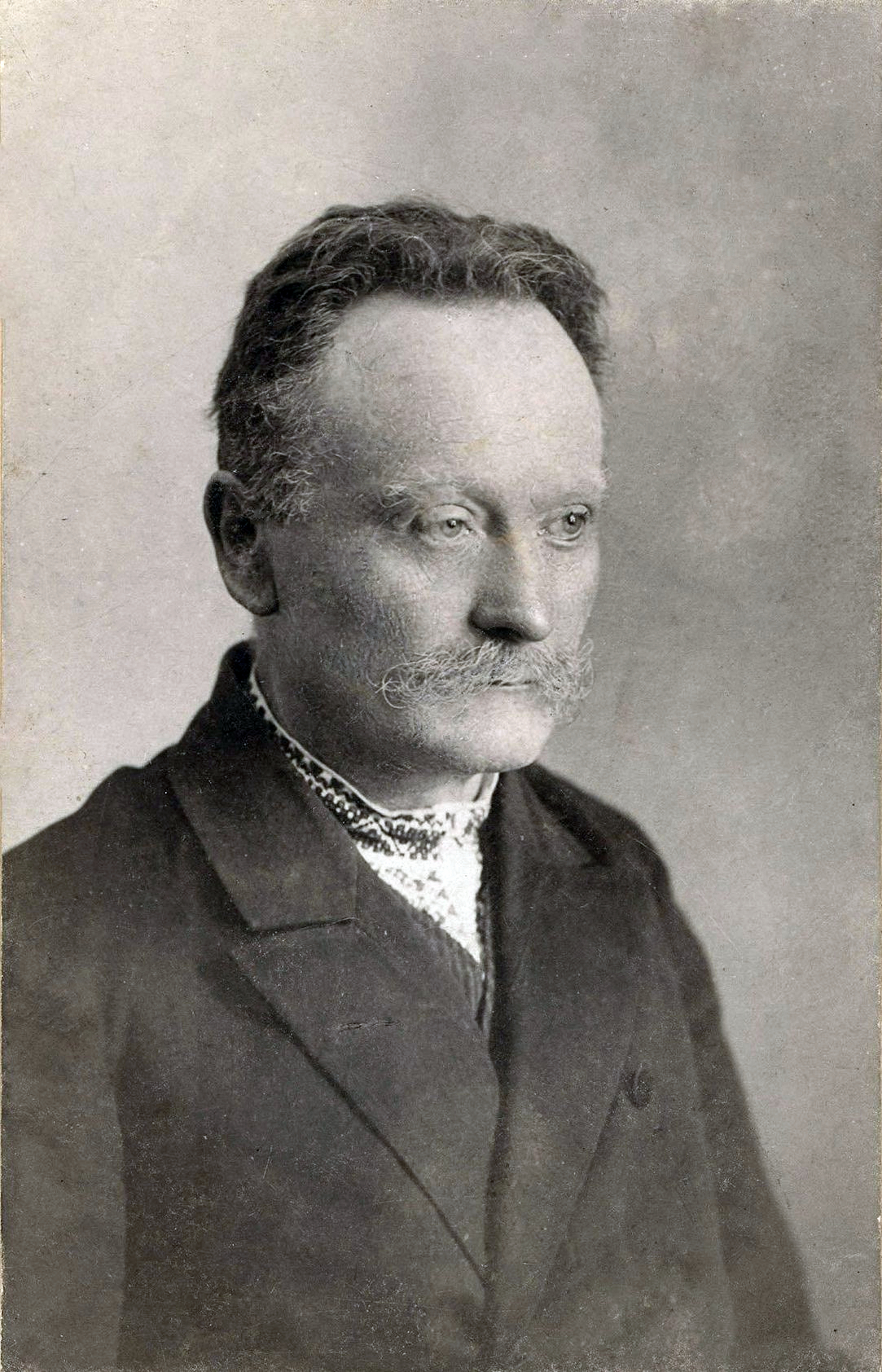
Franko

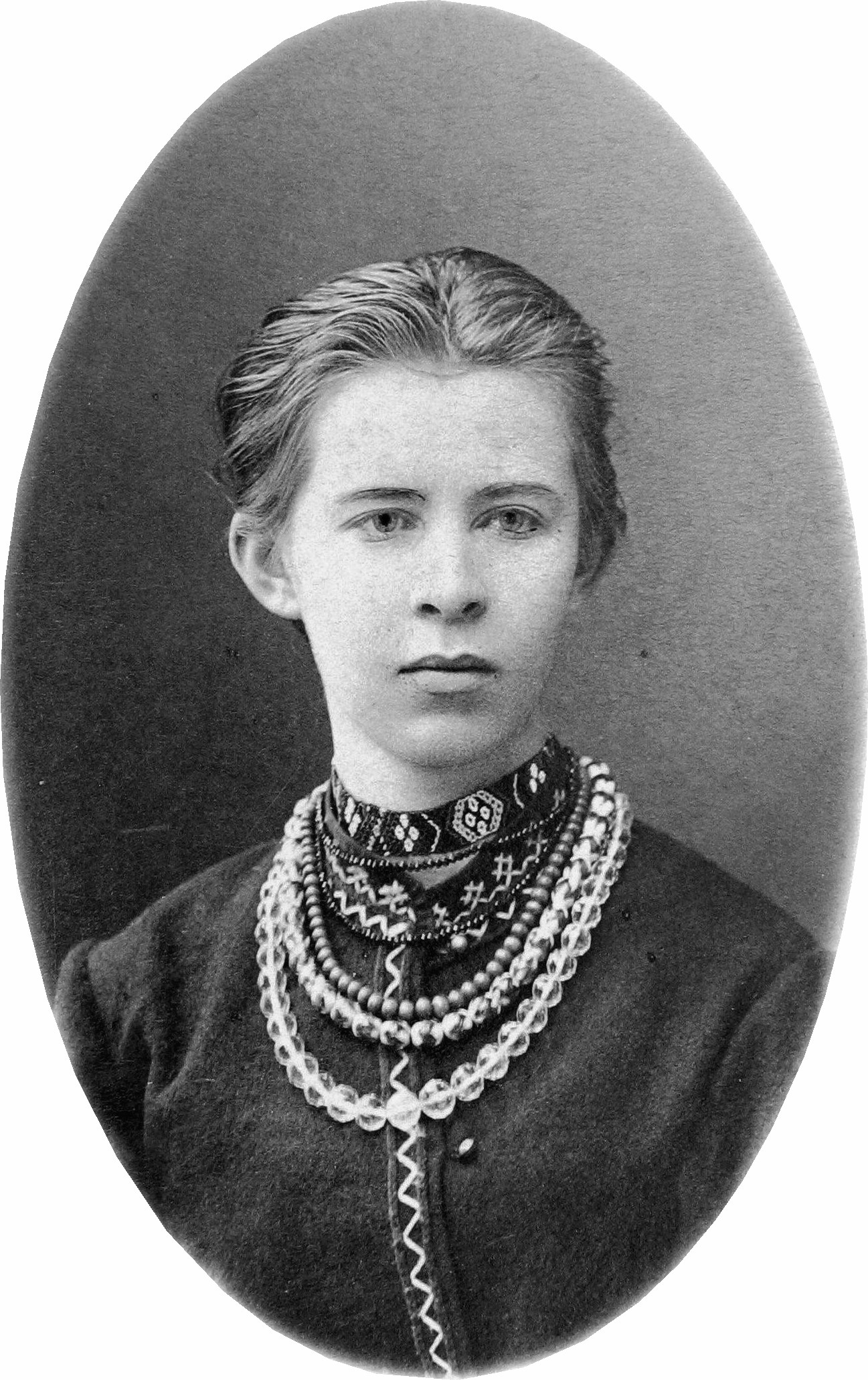
Ukrainka

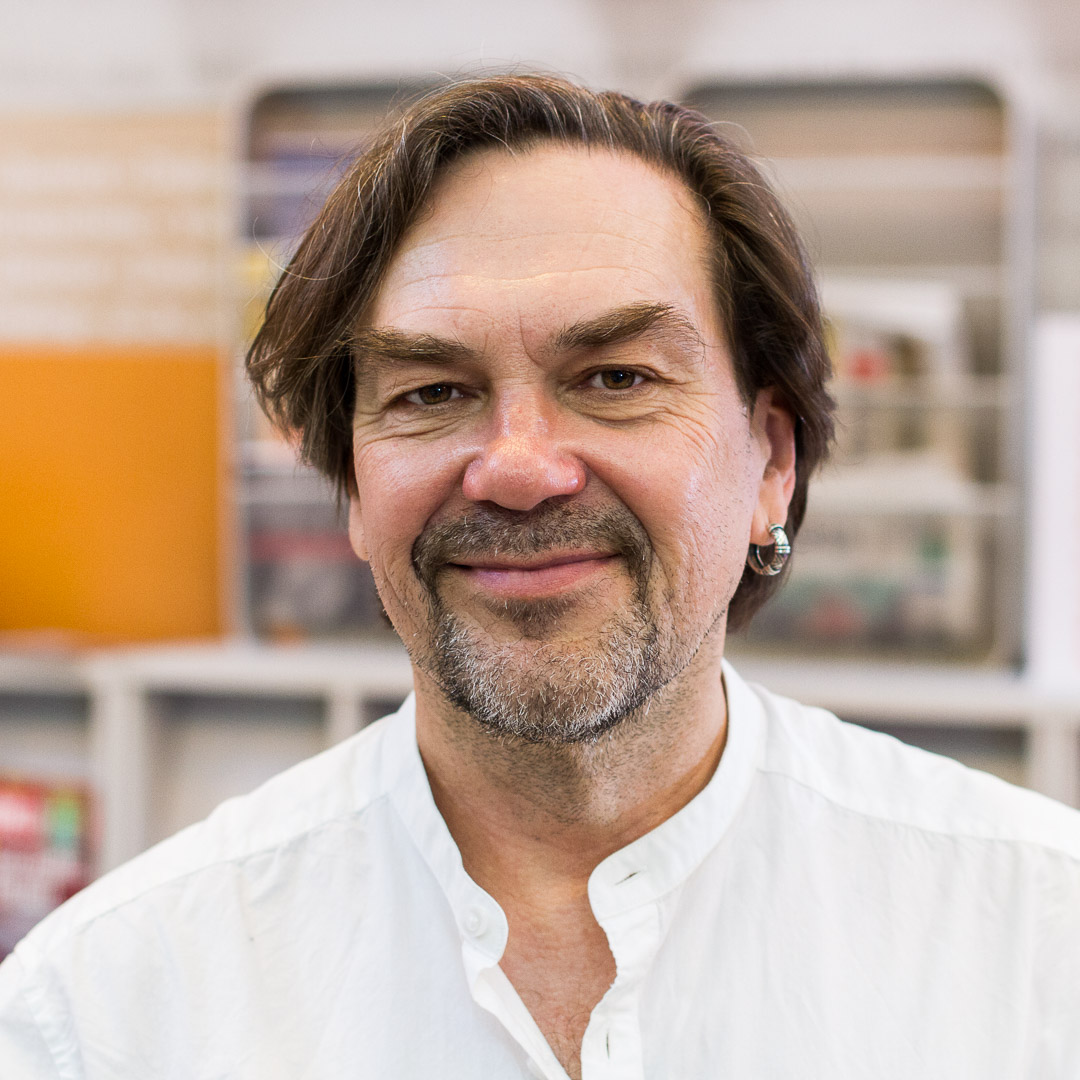
Andrukhovych

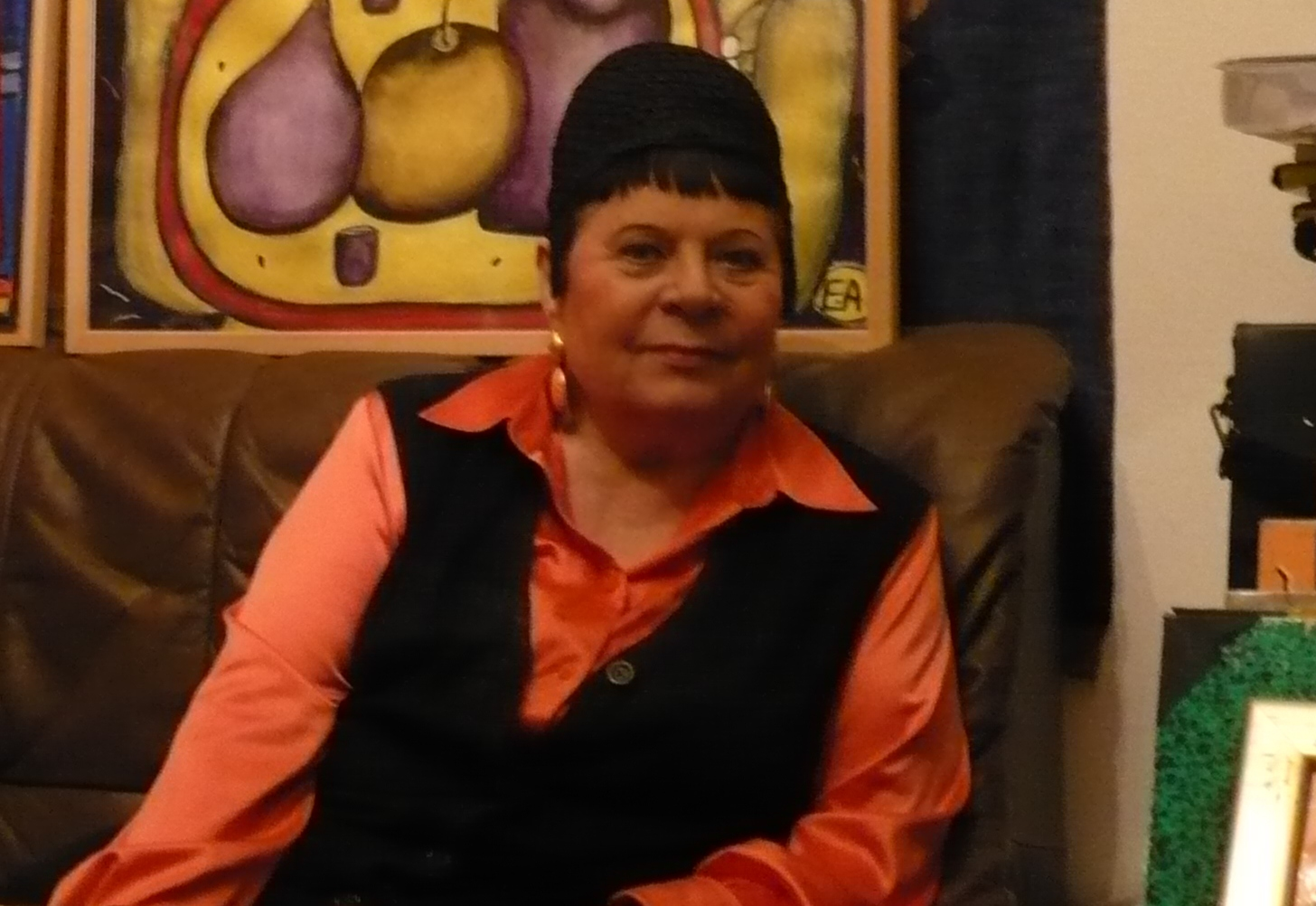
Andijewska

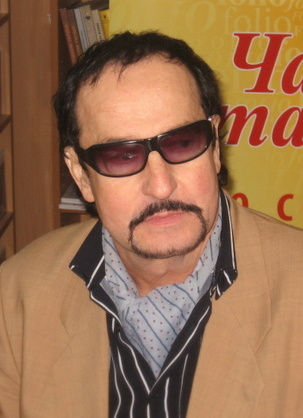
Pokalchuk

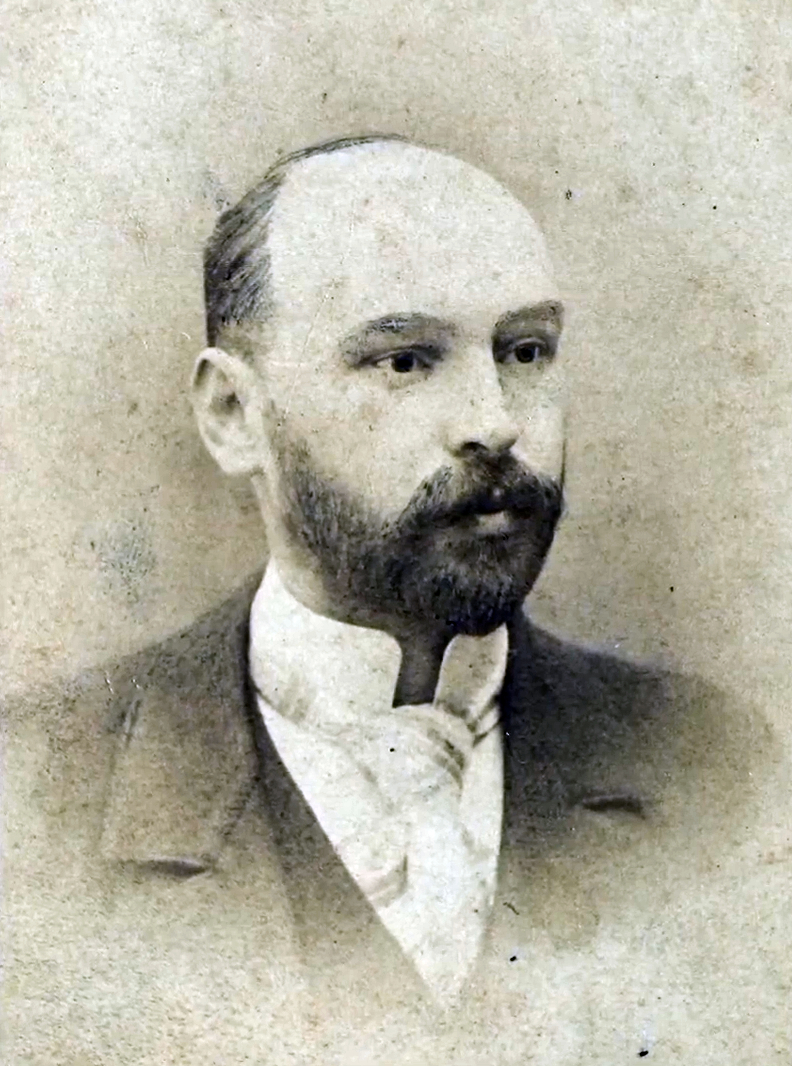
Kotsiubynsky

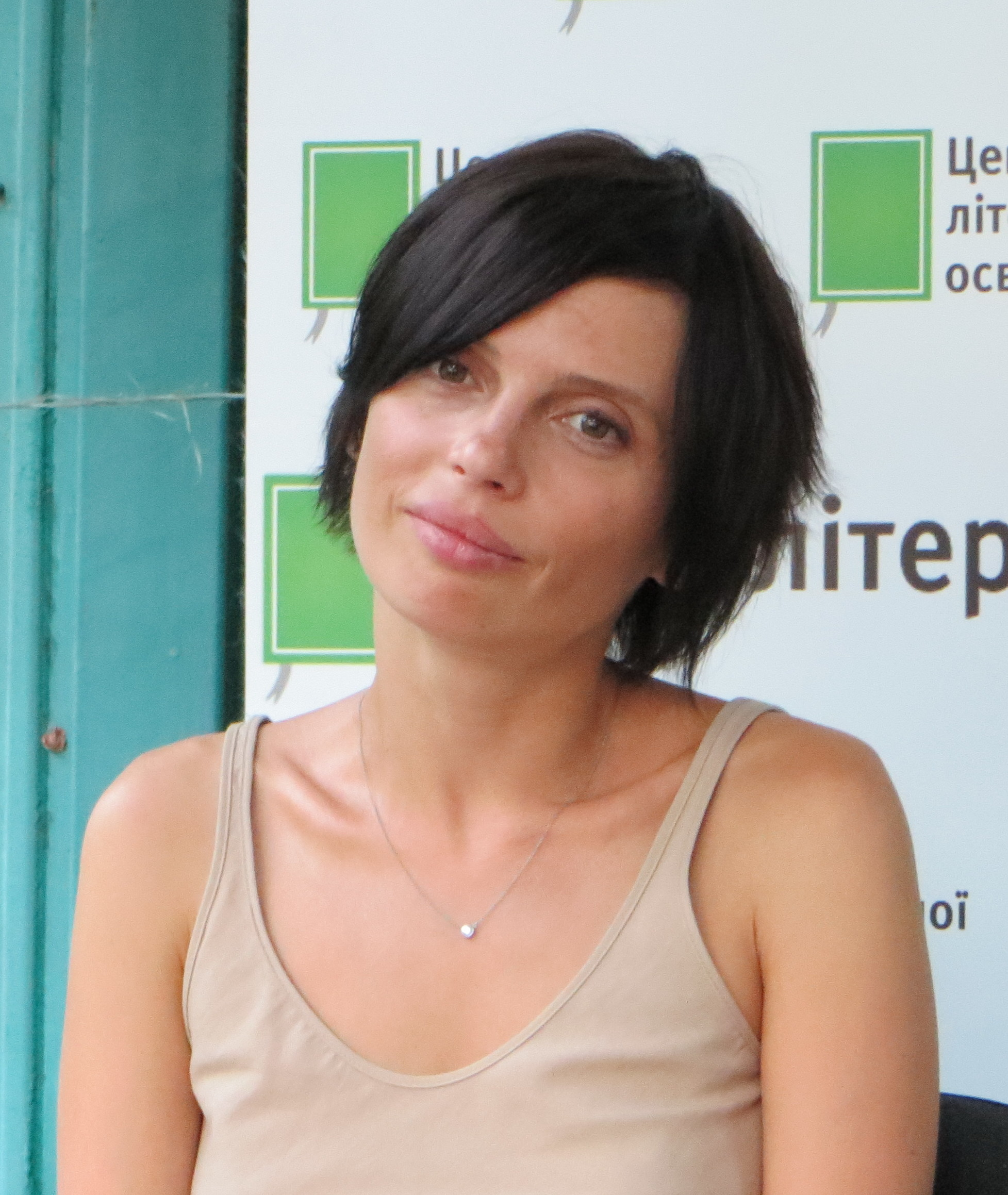
Karpa

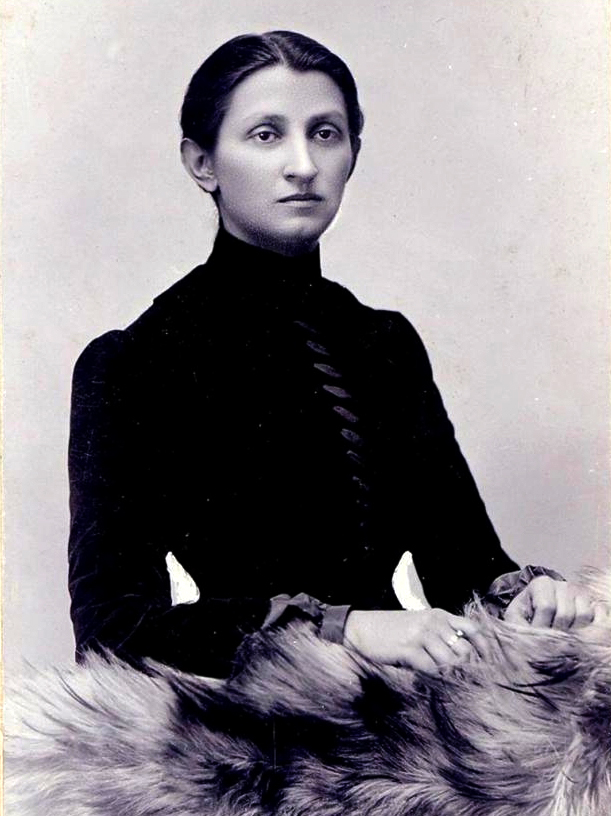
Kobylianska

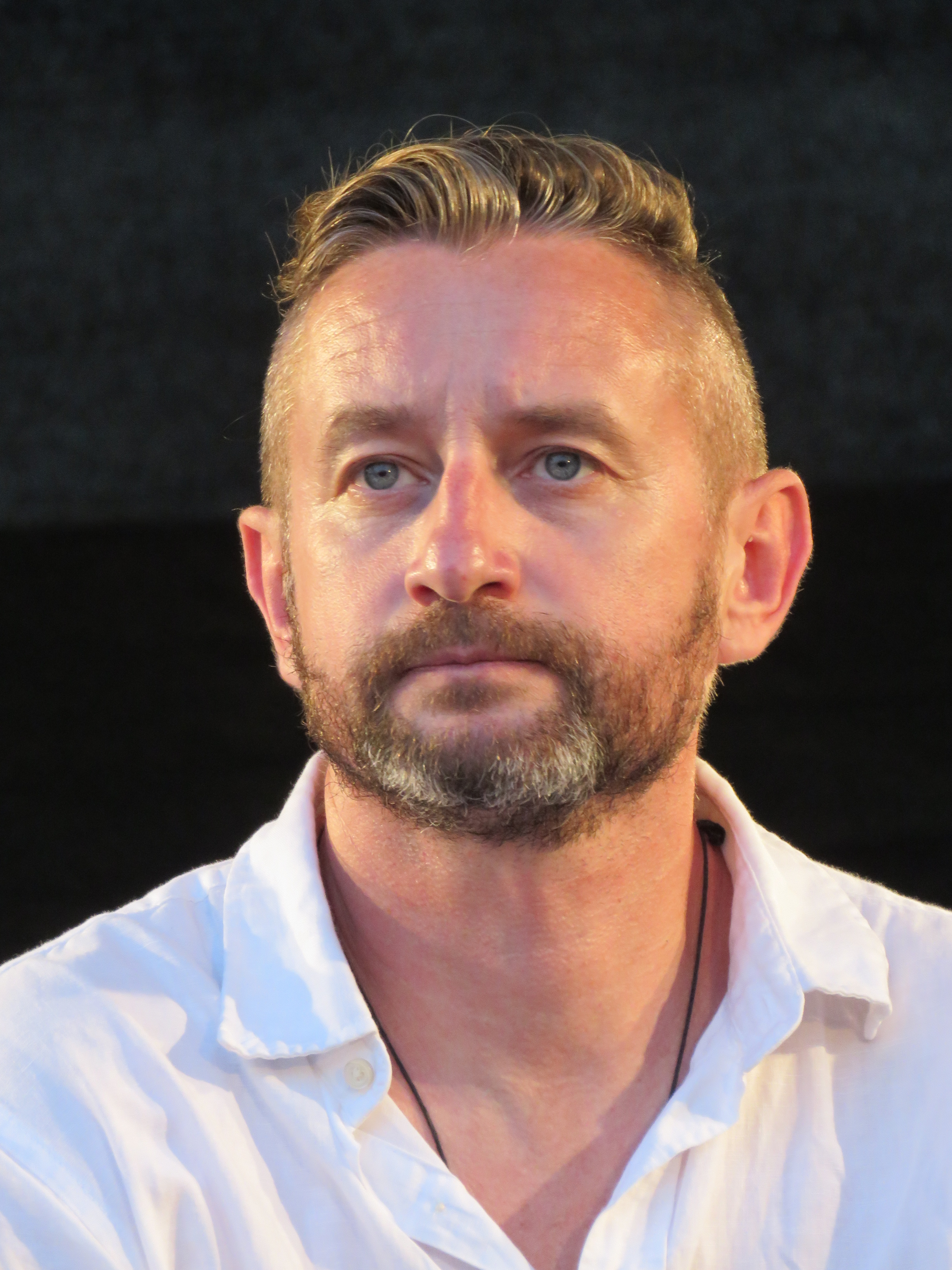
Zhadan

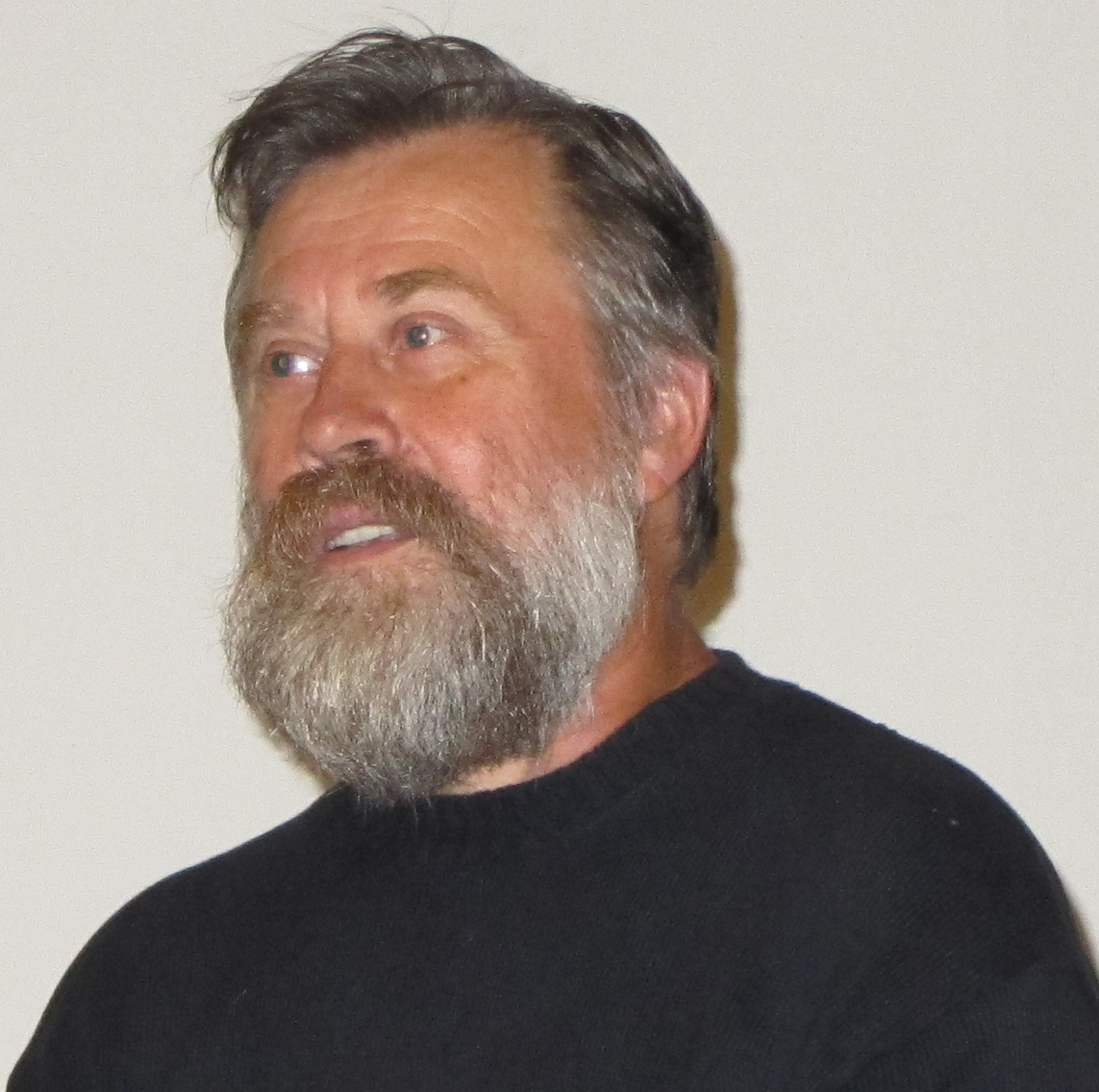
Lysheha

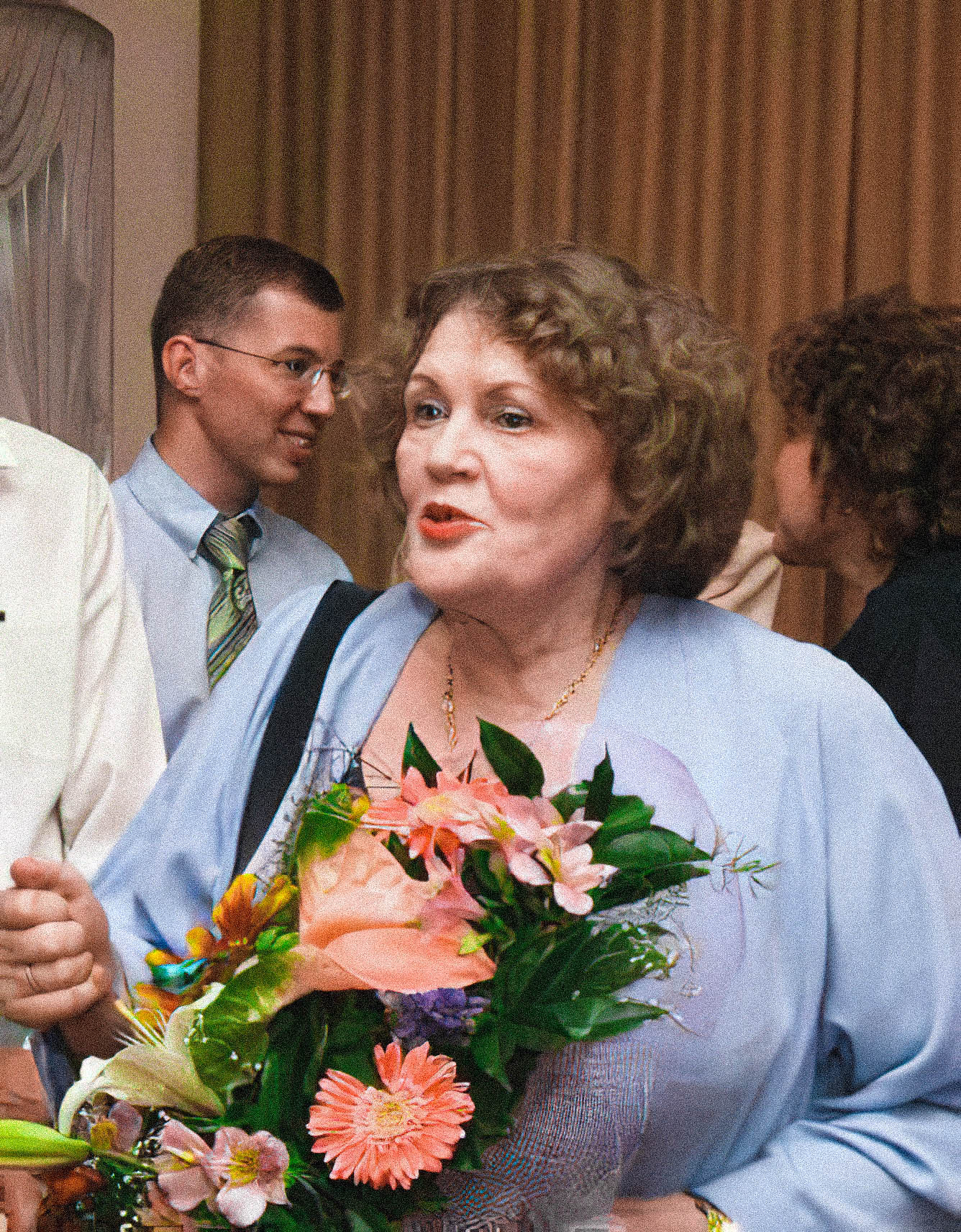
Kostenko

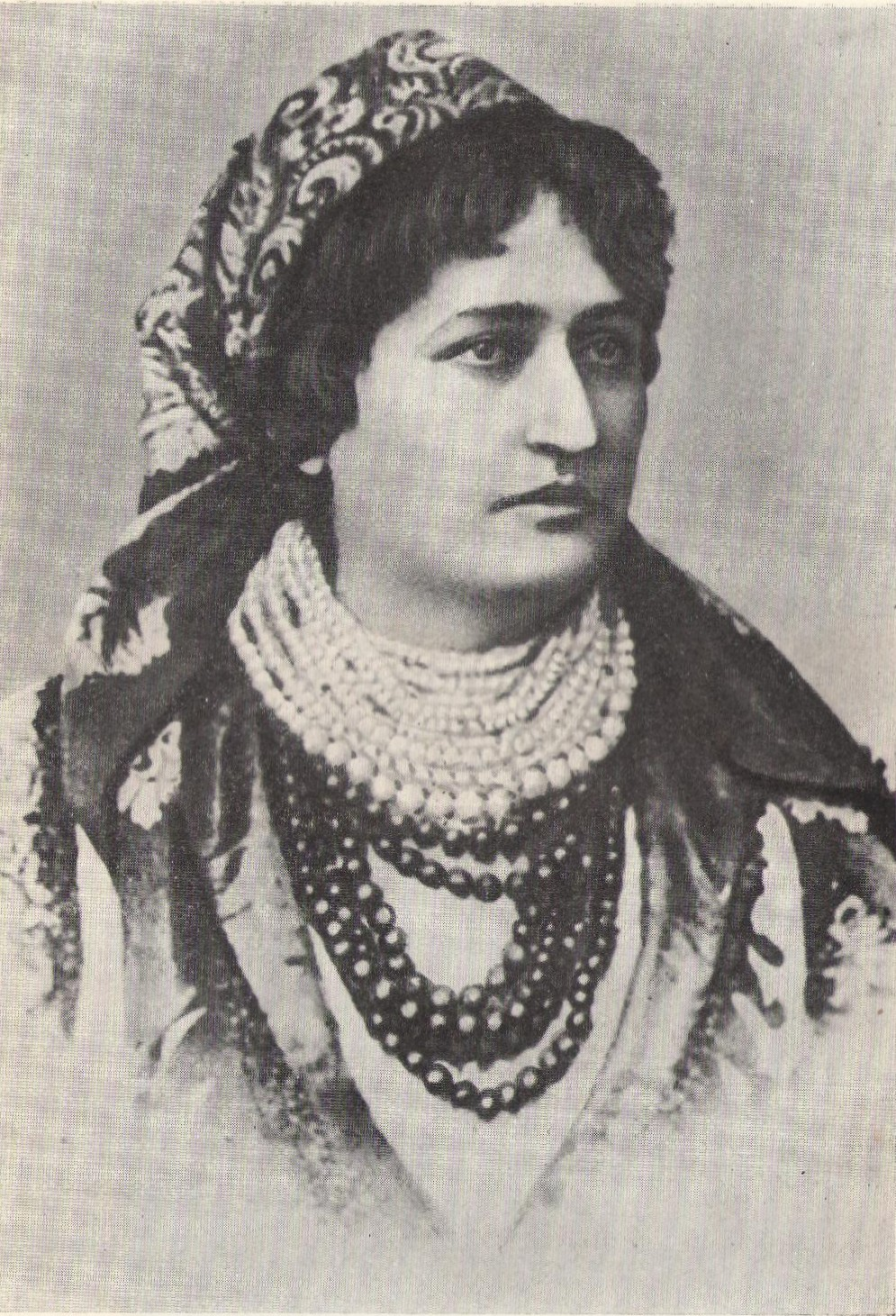
Kobrynska

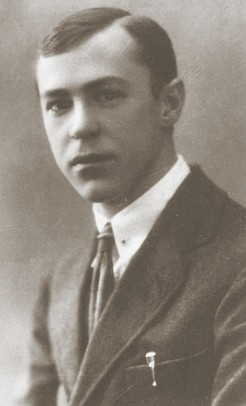
Pidmohylny

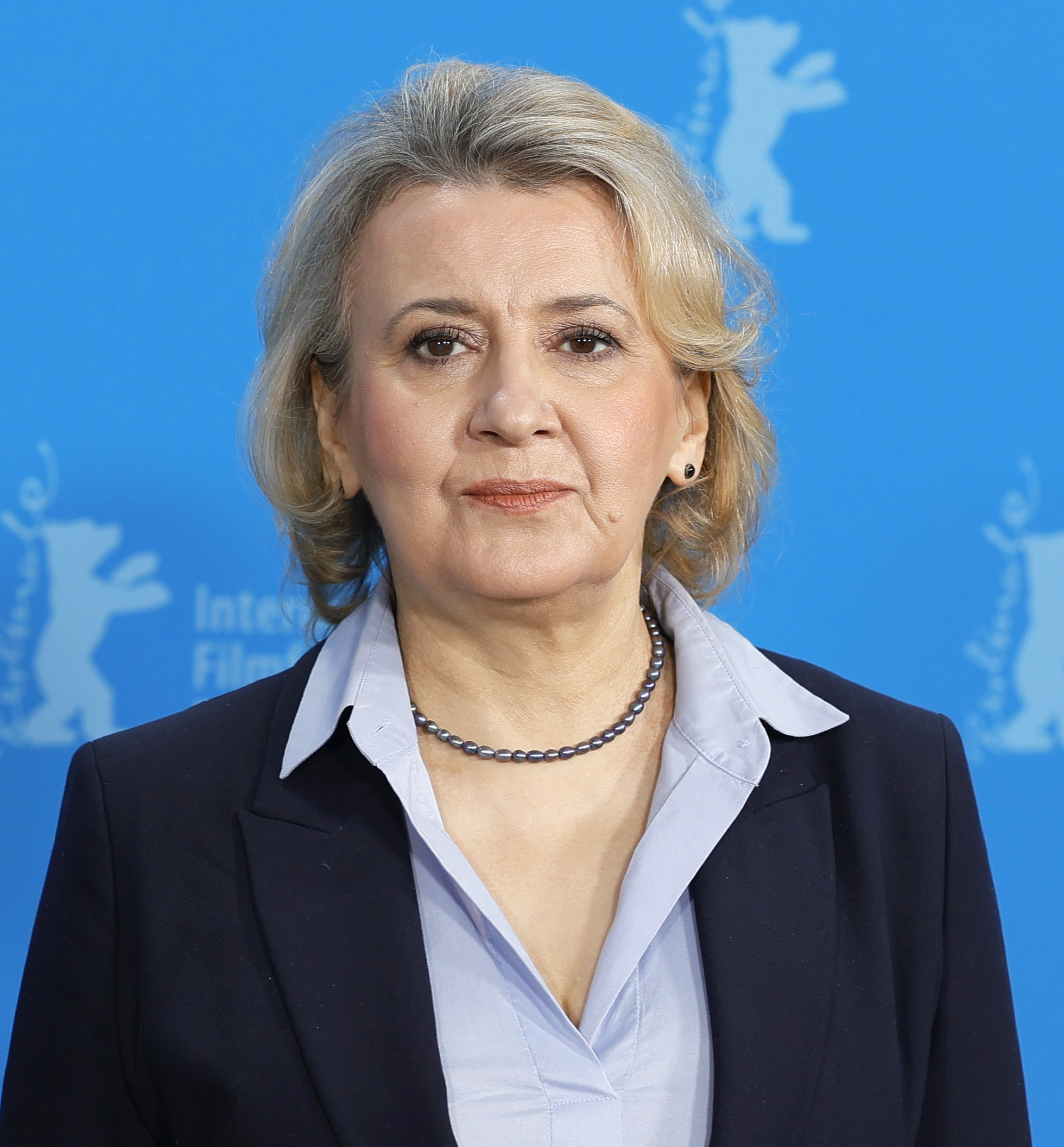
Zabuzhko

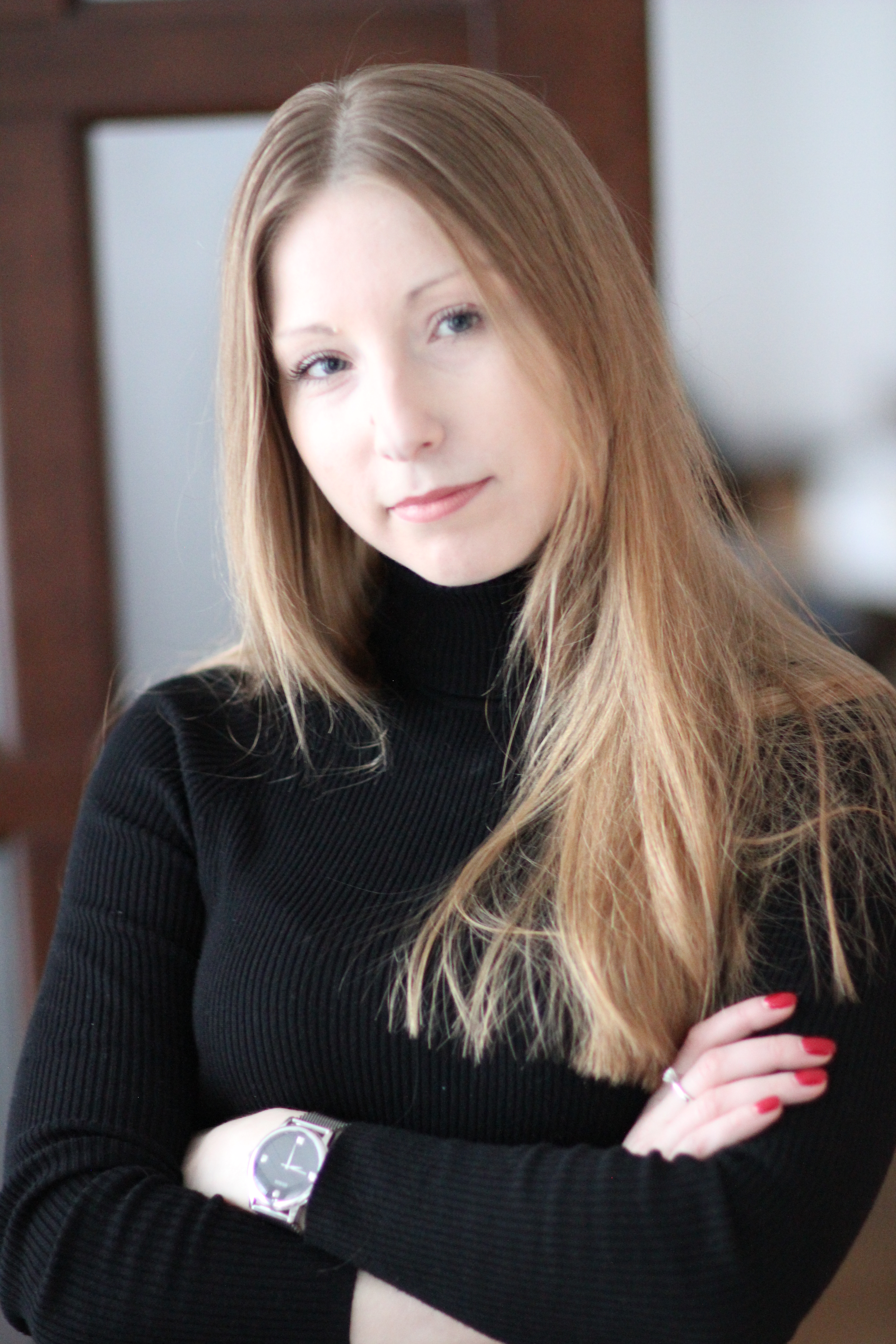
Amelina

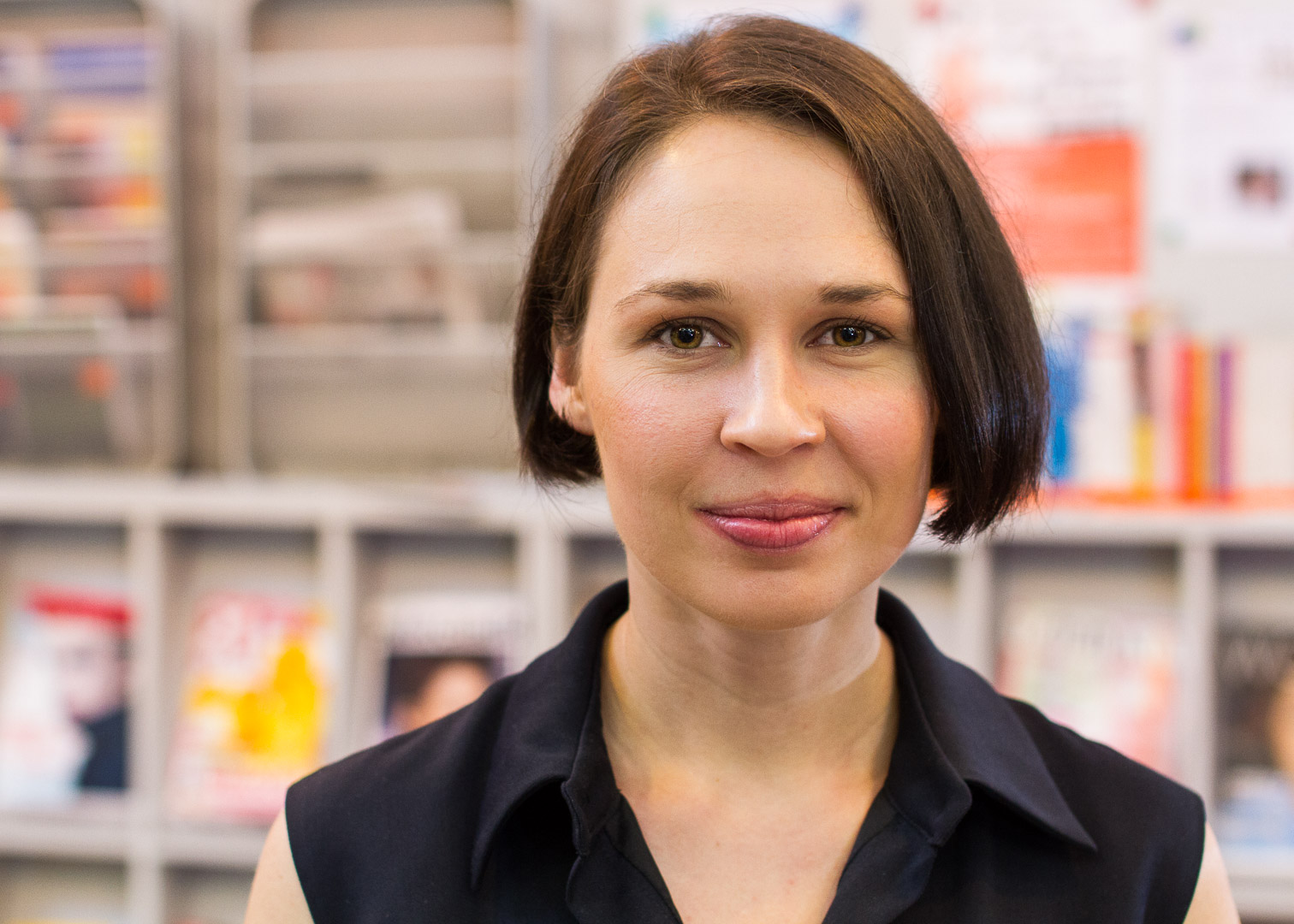
Andrukhovych

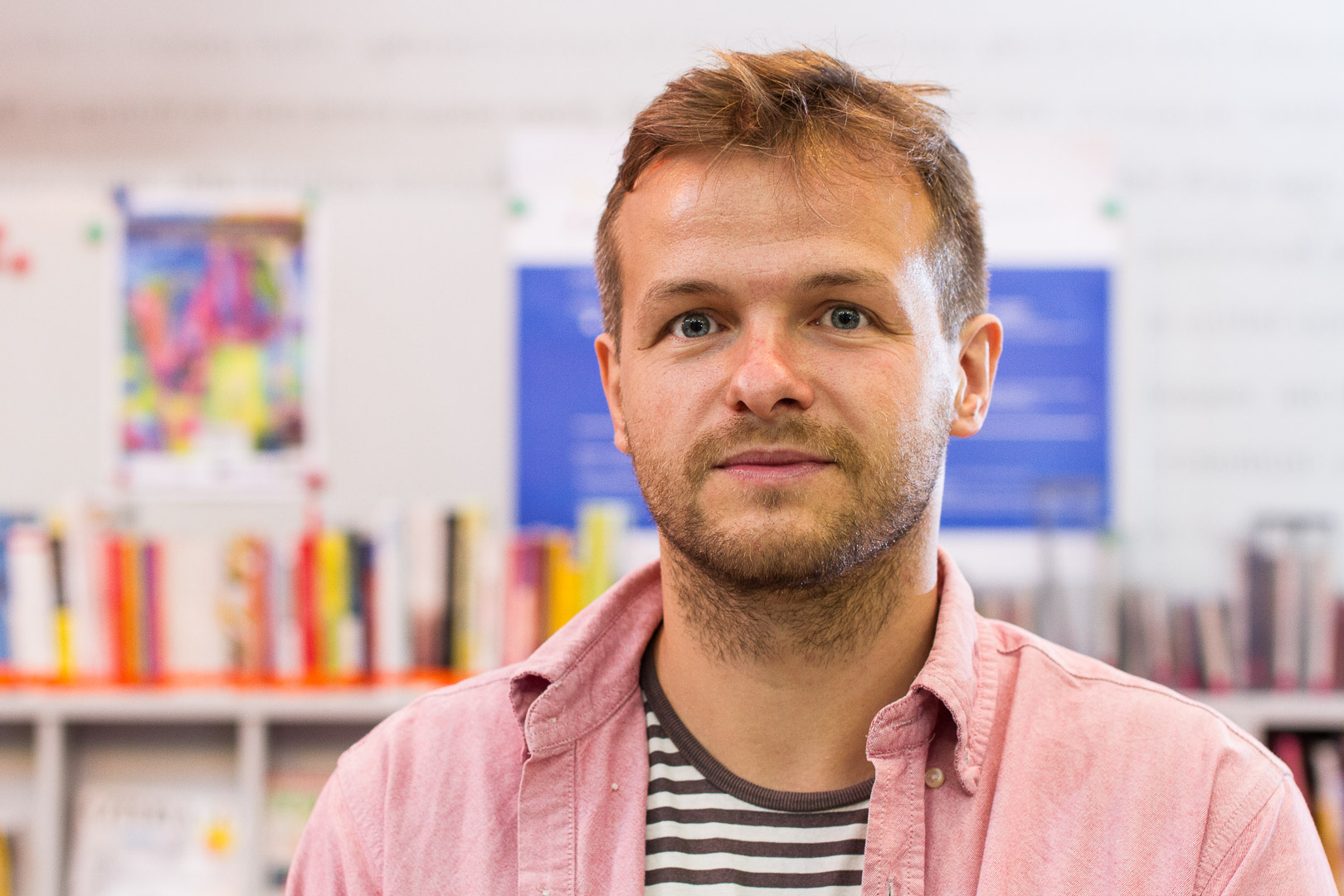
Chapeye

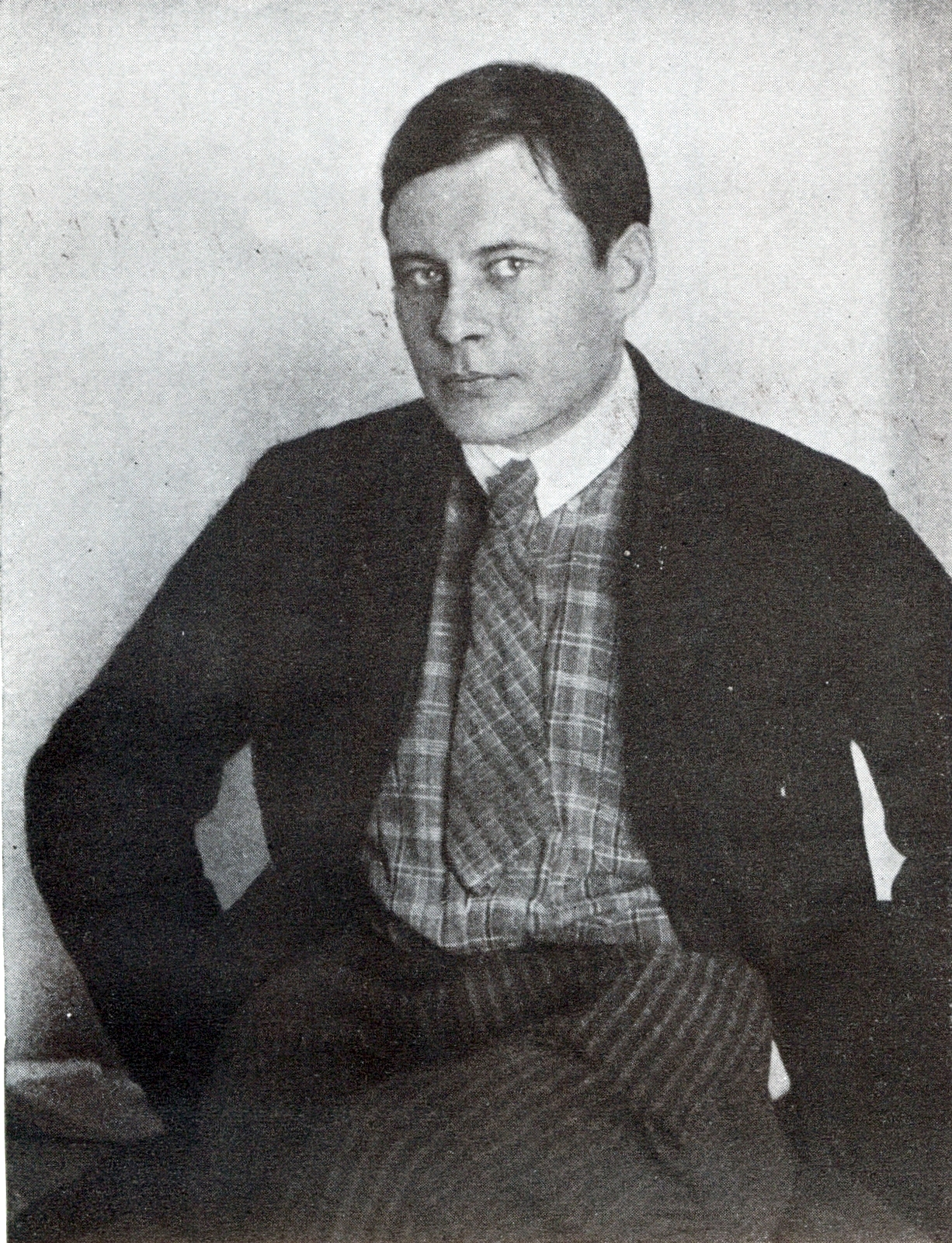
Yohansen

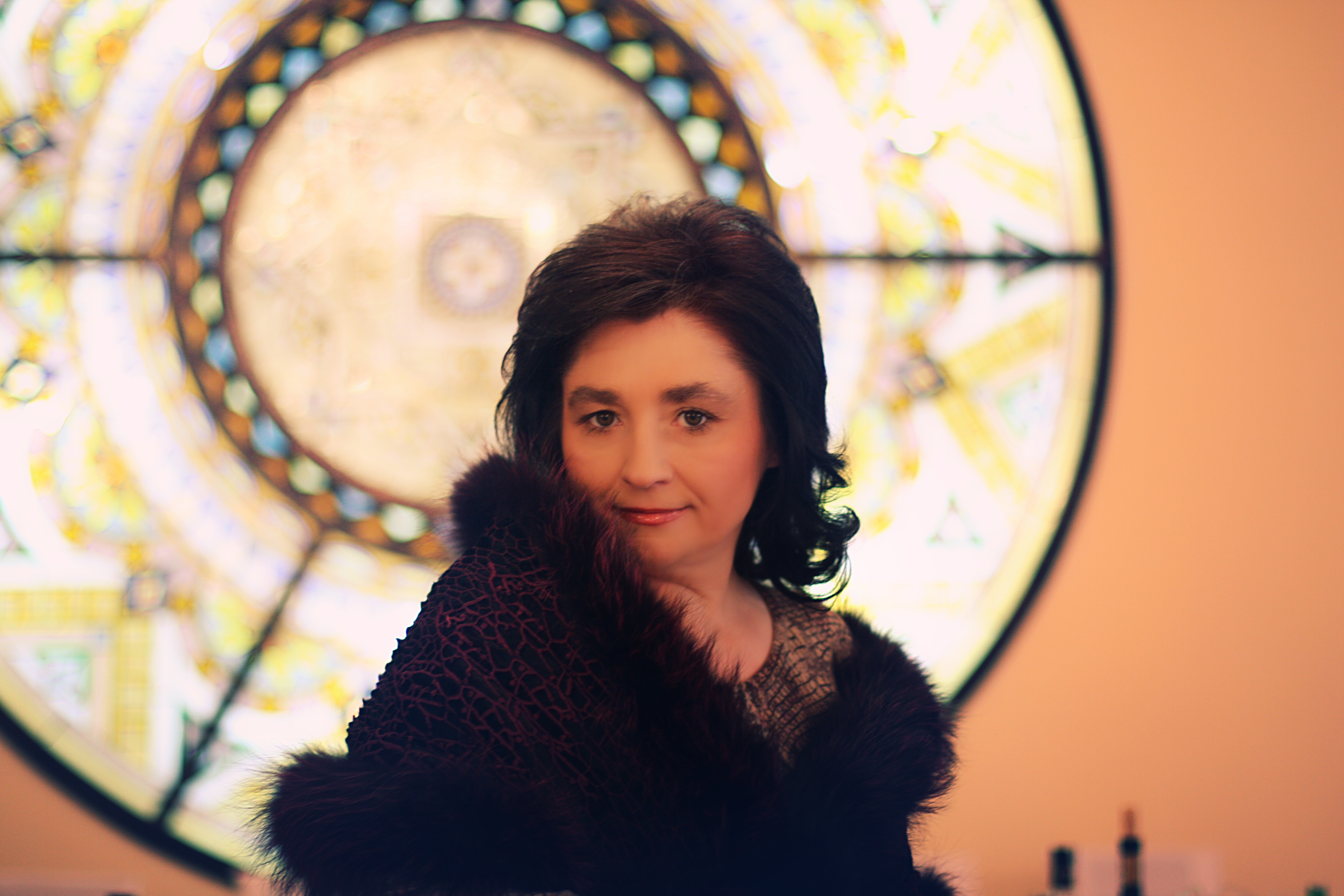
Matios

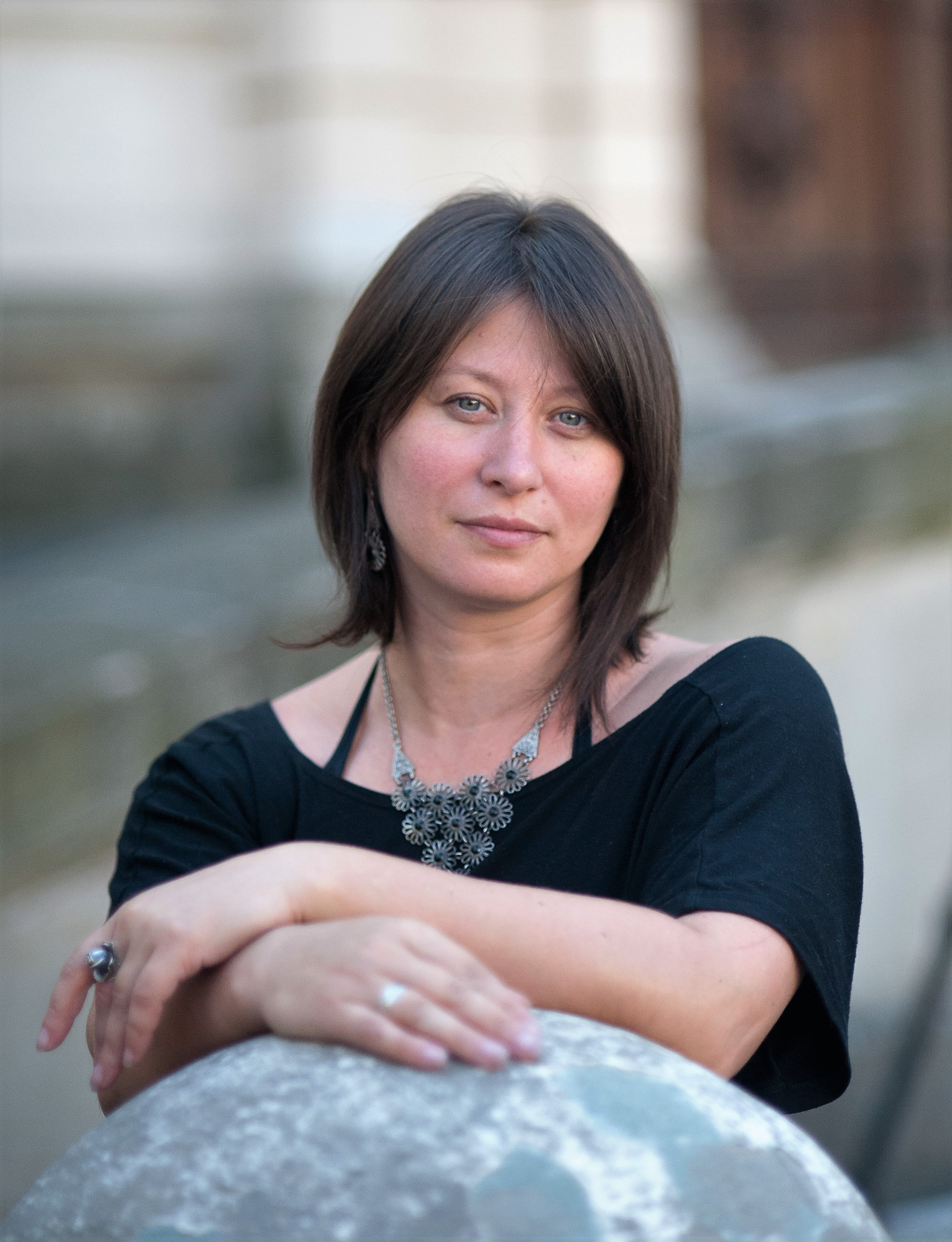
Kruk

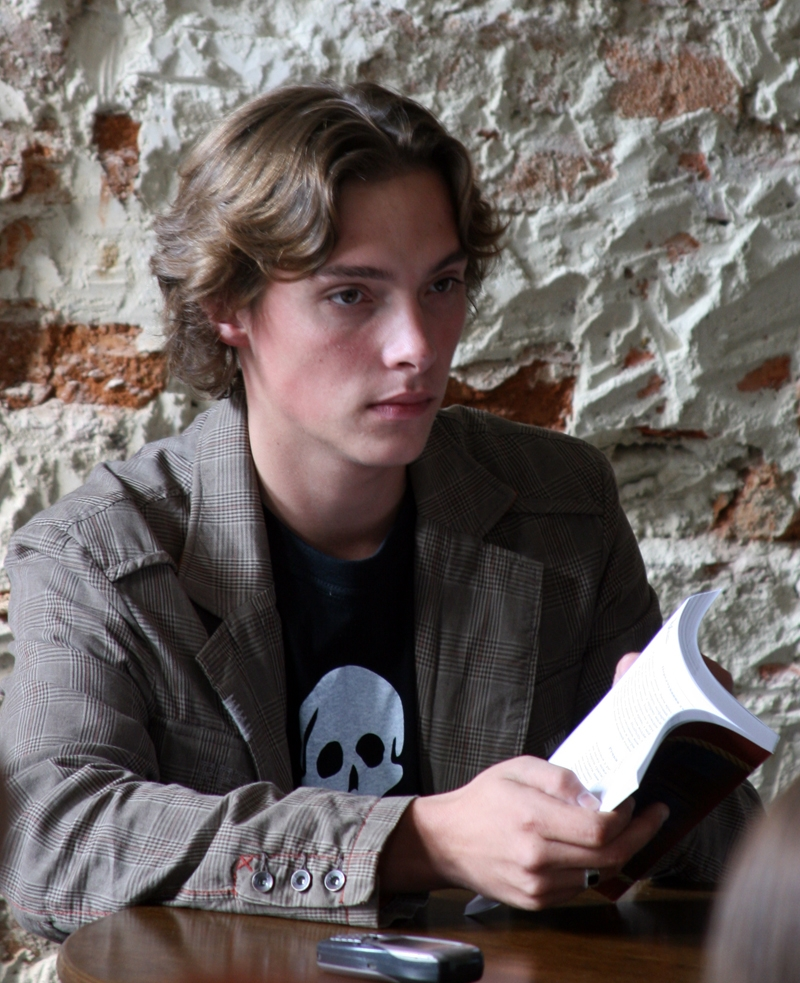
Lyubka

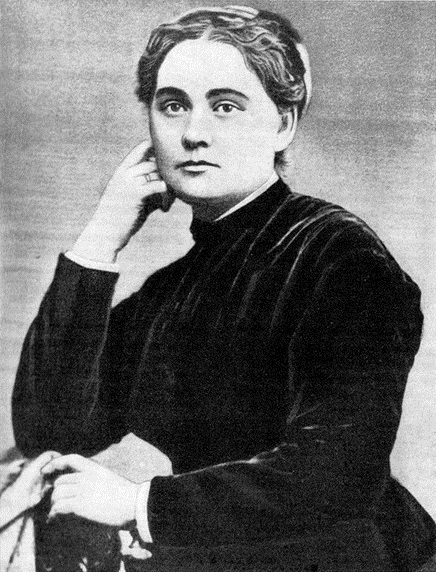
Vovchok

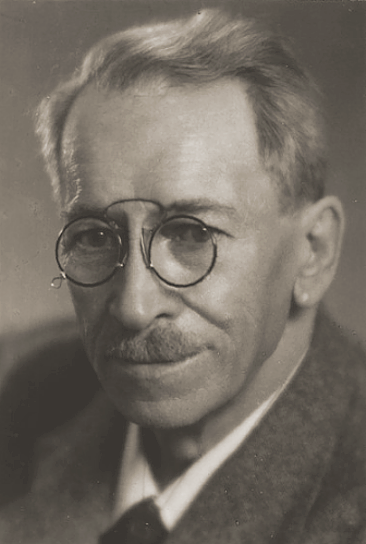
Oles

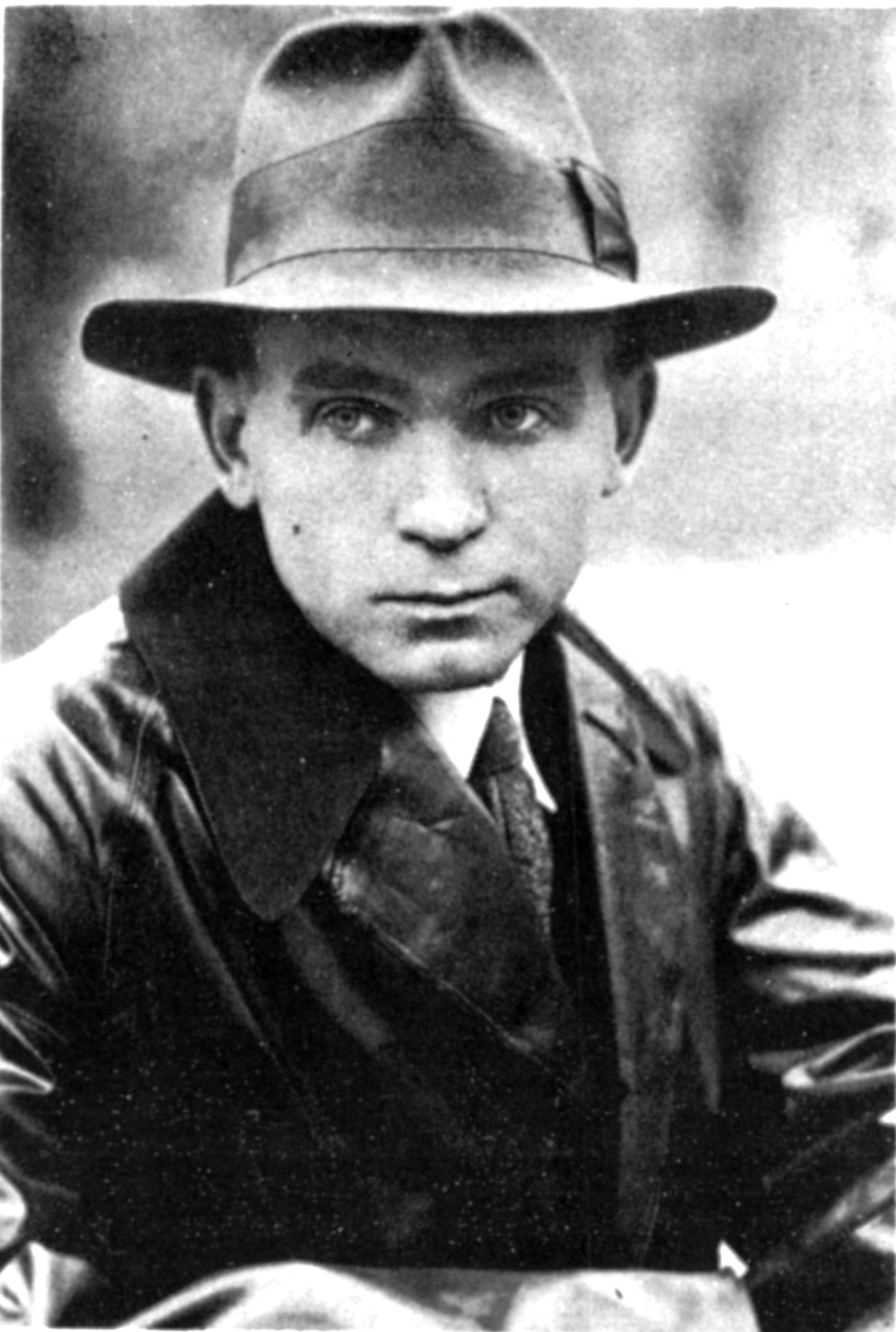
Samchuk

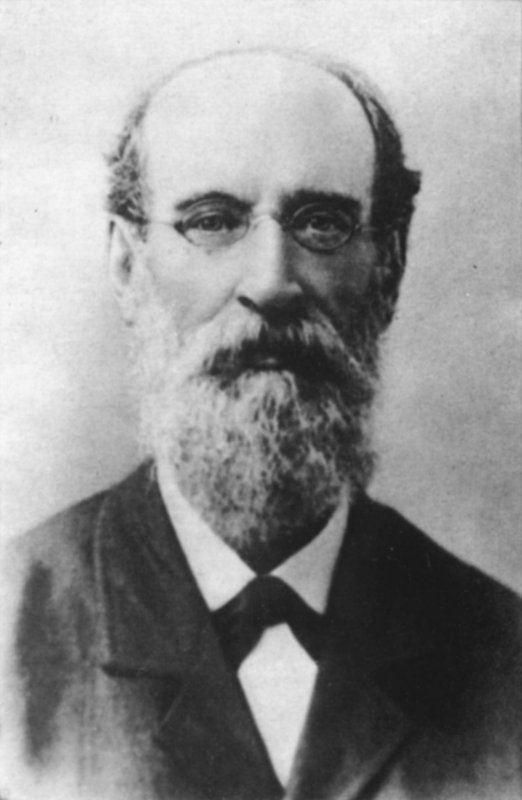
Myrny

This is a list of authors who have written works of prose and poetry in the Ukrainian language.

== A ==
- Victoria Amelina (1986–2023), poet and novelist
- Nikolai Amosov (1913–2002), novelist, essayist, and medical writer
- Emma Andijewska (born 1931), novelist, poet, and short story writer
- Nadija Hordijenko Andrianova (1921–1998), journalist, translator, and biographer
- Sofia Andrukhovych (born 1982), novelist, translator, and editor
- Yuri Andrukhovych (born 1960), novelist, poet, short story writer, essayist, and translator
- Borys Antonenko-Davydovych (1899–1984), writer, translator and linguist
- Bohdan Ihor Antonych (1909–1937), poet, translator, and editor

== B ==
- Kateryna Babkina (born 1985), poet, short story writer, novelist, playwright and screenwriter
- Anna Bahriana (born 1981), novelist, poet, playwright, and translator
- Ivan Bahrianyi (1906–1963), poet, novelist, and essayist
- Mykola Bakay (1931–1998), poet, and songwriter
- Vasyl Barka (1908–2003), poet, writer, literary critic, and translator
- Volodymyr Ivanovych Barvinok (1879–1943), historian, theologian, and bibliographer
- Hanna Barvinok (1828–1911), writer and folklorist
- Mykola Bazhan (1904–1983), poet, editor, and translator
- Natalia Belchenko (born 1973), poet and translator
- Oles Berdnyk (1927–2003), science fiction writer, futurist and globalist, philosopher and theologian
- Nina Bichuya (born 1937), novelist, and children's writer
- Natalka Bilotserkivets (born 1954), poet, and translator
- Dmytro Blazheyovskyi (1910–2011), historian, and theologian
- Osip Bodyansky (1808–1878), poet, memoirist, historian, and ethnographer
- Levko Borovykovsky (1806–1889), romantic poet, writer, translator, and folklorist.

== C ==
- Dniprova Chayka (1861–1927), poet, short story writer, and children's writer
- Artem Chapeye (born 1981), writer, reporter, translator, and activist
- Olena Chekan (1946–2013), actress, voice artist, screenwriter, journalist and social activist
- Artem Chekh (born 1985), writer and journalist
- Marko Cheremshyna (1874–1927), short story writer, and translator
- Tetiana Cherep-Perohanych (born 1974), poet, novelist, playwright and journalist
- Boris Chichibabin (1923–1994), poet
- Daria Chubata (born 1940), physician, writer, and poet
- Taras Chubay (born 1970), poet, and songwriter
- Pavlo Chubynsky (1839–1884), poet and ethnographer
- Eugenia Chuprina (born 1971), poet, writer, playwright

== D ==
- Larysa Denysenko (born 1973), writer, lawyer, human rights activist, TV and radio presenter
- Myroslav Dochynets (born 1959), novelist, short story writer, and journalist
- Dmytro Dontsov (1883–1973), editor, publisher, journalist, and literary critic
- Ivan Drach (born 1936), poet, screenwriter, and literary critic

and political activist

- Mykhailo Drahomanov (1841–1895), intellectual, publisher, economist, historian, philosopher and ethnographer
- Yuriy Drohobych (1450–1494), philosopher, science writer, theologian, and ethnographer
- Alexander Dukhnovich (1803–1865), poet, historian, and ethnographer
- Bohdana Durda (born 1940), writer, poet and songwriter
- Ivan Dziuba (1931–2022), literary critic, social activist and dissident
- Tetiana Dziuba (born 1966), writer, literary critic, journalist and translator

== E ==
- Vasyl Ellan-Blakytny (1894–1925), poet, and journalist
- Hryhorii Epik (1901–1937), novelist, short story writer, journalist, screenwriter, and publisher

== F ==
- Yuriy Fedkovych (1834–1888), short story writer, poet, folklorist, editor, and translator
- Moysey Fishbein (born 1946), poet, editor, and translator
- Ivan Franko (1856–1916), novelist, poet, literary critic, journalist, and translator
- Petro Franko (1890–1941), novelist, memoirist, and screenwriter

== G ==
- Vasyl Gogol-Yanovsky (1777–1825), poet, and playwright
- Yuriy Gorlis-Gorsky (1898–1946) writer, public figure
- Viktor Grabovskyj (born 1942), poet, translator, literary critic, and journalist
- Lydia Grigorieva (born 1945), poet
- Nataliya Gumenyuk (born 1983), journalist and writer

== H ==
- Pavlo Hai-Nyzhnyk (born 1971), poet, historian, science writer, and ethnographer
- Yaroslav Halan (1902–1949), playwright, publicist, journalist, translator and radio host
- Leonid Hlibov (1827–1893), poet, fabulist, children's writer, and editor
- Volodymyr Hnatiuk (1871–1926), folklorist, translator, ethnographer, and journalist
- Yakub Holovatsky (1814–1888), historian, ethnographer, bibliographer, and poet
- Oles Honchar (1918–1995), novelist, poet, short story writer, and journalist
- Yevhen Hrebinka (1812–1848), poet, fabulist, novelist, short story writer, and translator
- Borys Hrinchenko (1863–1910), historian, poet, and ethnographer
- Hrytsko Hryhorenko (1867–1924), poet, short story writer, translator, and journalist
- Volodymyr Huba (born 1938), poet
- Dokiya Humenna (1904–1996), writer
- Yevhen Hutsalo (1937–1995), poet, novelist, journalist, and children's writer

== I ==
- Myroslav Irchan (1897–1937), storywriter and playwright.
- Oksana Ivanenko (1906–1997), children's writer and translator
- Roman Ivanychuk (1929–2016), writer and politician
- Volodymyr Ivasyuk (1949–1979), poet, and songwriter

== K ==
- Igor Kaczurowskyj (1918–2013), poet, translator, novelist, short story writer, literary scholar, and journalist
- Ihor Kalynets (born 1939), poet
- Irena Karpa (1980), songwriter, and journalist
- Adrian Kashchenko (1858–1921), short story writer, historian, and publisher
- Hrytsko Kernerenko (1863–1941), poet
- Hnat Khotkevych (1877–1938), novelist, short story writer, ethnographer, and playwright
- Mykola Khvylovy (1893–1933), poet, short story writer, and novelist
- Max Kidruk (born 1984), novelist, short story writer, and travel writer
- Iya Kiva (born 1984), poet, translator, journalist, and critic
- Marianna Kiyanovska (born 1973), poet and translator
- Olha Kobylianska (1863–1942), novelist, short story writer, and playwright
- Oleksandr Konysky (1836–1900), novelist, poet, educator, and publisher
- Oleksandr Korniychuk (1905–1972), playwright, and literary critic.
- Ivan Feodosiyovych Korsak (born 1946), poet, novelist, short story writer, journalist, and editor
- Nataliya Kobrynska (1851–1920), novelist, short story writer, editor, and publisher
- Natalena Koroleva (1888–1966), novelist, short story writer
- Sonya Koshkina (born 1985), journalist, author
- Lina Kostenko (born 1930), poet, novelist, and children's writer
- Ivan Kotliarevsky (1769–1838), poet and playwright
- Mykhailo Kotsiubynsky (1864–1913), novelist and short story writer
- Uliana Kravchenko (1860–1947), educator, writer and poet
- Svitlana Kryvoruchko (born 1975), journalist, and editor
- Roman Kudlyk (born 1941), poet, editor, and literary critic
- Ivan Kulyk (1897–1937), poet, and translator
- Mykola Kulish (1892–1937), playwright, and poet
- Panteleimon Kulish (1819–1897), novelist, literary critic, poet, folklorist, historian, and translator
- Zenon Kuzela (1882–1952), journalist, historian, and editor
- Hryhory Kvitka-Osnovianenko (1778–1843), playwright, novelist, short story writer, and journalist

== L ==
- Bohdan Lepky (1872–1941), poet, and translator
- Serhiy Leshchenko (born 1980), journalist, and editor
- Oleh Lysheha (1949–2014), poet, playwright, and translator
- Myroslav Laiuk (born 1990), novelist, poet, scriptwriter

== M ==
- Mykhaylo Maksymovych (1804–1873), historian, educator, and folklorist
- Ivan Malkovych (born 1961), poet, and publisher
- Volodymyr Malyk (1921–1998), novelist
- Mykola Markevych (1804–1860), historian, ethnographer, and poet
- Yaroslav Melnyk (born 1959), novelist, short story writer, and literary critic
- Amvrosii Metlynsky (1814–1870), poet, ethnographer, and publisher.
- Eugene Miroshnichenko (born 1939), critic, historian and journalist
- Pavlo Movchan (born 1939), poet
- Panas Myrny (1849–1920), novelist, and playwright

== N ==
- Ivan Nechuy-Levytsky (1838–1918), novelist, short story writer, and playwright
- Vsevolod Nestayko (1930–2014), children's writer

== O ==
- Theodore Odrach (1912–1964), novelist, short story writer, and memoirist
- Oleksandr Oles (1878–1944), poet, and playwright
- Yaroslav Oros (born 1959), novelist and journalist

== P ==
- Tomasz Padura (1801–1871), poet, and songwriter
- Atena Pashko (1931–2012), chemical engineer, poet, social activist
- Dmytro Pavlychko (1929–2023), poet, translator, and screenwriter
- Ihor Pavlyuk (born 1967), poet, novelist, and essayist
- Olena Pchilka (1849–1930), poet, ethnographer, and translator
- Halyna Petrosanyak (born 1969), poet, writer and translator
- Viktor Petrov (1894–1969), novelist, and science writer
- Mariyka Pidhiryanka (1881–1963), poet, and children's writer
- Valerian Pidmohylny (1901–1937), novelist, short story writer, translator, and literary critic
- Les Podervianskyi (born 1952), playwright, and poet
- Yuri Pokalchuk (1941–2008), poet, novelist, short story writer, translator, and literary critic
- Valentyn Prodaievych (born 1960), journalist and writer
- Svitlana Pyrkalo (born 1976), novelist, essayist, editor, and journalist

== R ==
- Valentyn Rechmedin (1916–1986), novelist, journalist, editor, and literary critic
- Maksym Rylsky (1895–1964), poet

== S ==
- Ulas Samchuk (1905–1987), journalist, and publicist
- Mariana Savka (born 1973), poet, children's writer, translator and a publisher
- Mykhaylo Semenko (1892–1937), poet, and editor
- Iryna Senyk (1926–2009), poet
- Markiyan Shashkevych (1811–1843), poet, and translator
- Taras Shevchenko (1814–1861), poet, playwright, folklorist, and ethnographer
- Vasyl Shkliar (born 1951), writer and political activist
- Iryna Shuvalova (born 1986), poet, translator and scholar
- Lyubov Sirota (born 1956), poet, essayist, playwright, journalist, and translator
- Liudmyla Skyrda (born 1945), poet, translator, and literary critic
- Maryna Sokolyan (born 1979), novelist, short story writer, and playwright
- Volodymyr Sosiura (1898–1965), poet
- Mykhailo Starytsky (1840–1904), poet, novelist, and playwright
- Vasyl Stefanyk (1871–1936), short story writer
- Ivan Steshenko (1873–1918), poet, journalist, editor, and translator
- Vasyl Stus (1938–1985), poet, and publicist
- Vasyl Symonenko (1935–1963), poet, and journalist

== T ==
- Yuriy Tarnawsky (born 1934) fiction, poetry, plays, translations, and literary criticism
- Olena Teliha (1906–1942), novelist, short story writer, poet, playwright, translator, and literary critic
- Hryhoriy Tiutiunnyk (1920–1961), poet
- Tryzuby Stas (1948–2007), poet and songwriter
- Volodymyr Tsybulko (born 1964), poet
- Pavlo Tychyna (1891–1967), poet and translator

== U ==
- Lesya Ukrainka (1871–1913), poet, playwright, literary critic, and essayist

== V ==
- Ivan Vahylevych (1811–1866), poet, and ethnographer
- Iryna Vilde (1907–1982), writer and correspondent
- Lesya Voronyna (born 1955), writer, translator and journalist
- Marko Vovchok (1833–1907), novelist, short story writer, and translator
- Vira Vovk (born 1926), poet, novelist, playwright, and translator
- Volodymyr Vynnychenko (1880–1951), novelist, short story writer, and playwright
- Leonid Vysheslavsky (1914–2002), poet, literary critic, and translator
- Ostap Vyshnya (1889–1956), short story writer, and journalist

== Y ==
- Sofia Yablonska (1907–1971) writer, photographer and architect.
- Tetiana Yakovenko (born 1954), poet, literary critic, teacher
- Mykhailo Yalovy (1895–1937), novelist, poet, playwright, and editor
- Volodymyr Yaniv (1908–1981), poet
- Lyubov Yanovska (1861–1933), novelist, short story writer, and playwright
- Yevheniya Yaroshynska (1868–1904), journalist, short story writer, editor, and translator
- Volodymyr Yavorivsky (1942–2021), novelist, short story writer, poet, and journalist
- Dmytro Yavornytsky (1855–1940), historian, archeologist, ethnographer, folklorist, and lexicographer
- Serhiy Yefremov (1876–1939), journalist, and literary critic
- Volodymyr Yermolenko (born 1980), philosopher, essayist and translator
- Ivan Yizhakevych (1864–1962), painter and writer
- Olexiy Yurin (born 1982), poet

== Z ==
- Oksana Zabuzhko (born 1960), novelist, poet, essayist
- Pavlo Zahrebelnyi (1924–2009), novelist, and short story writer
- Mykola Zerov (1890–1937), poet, translator, and literary critic
- Serhiy Zhadan (born 1974), poet, novelist, essayist, and translator
- Iryna Zhylenko (born 1941–2013), poet, short story writer, and children's writer

== See also ==
- Ukrainian literature
- Contemporary Ukrainian literature
- List of Ukrainian-language poets
- List of Ukrainian women writers
