= Kryvoruchko =

Kryvoruchko or Krivoruchko (Ukrainian or Russian: Криворучко) is a gender-neutral Ukrainian surname. It may refer to:

- Aleksandr Krivoruchko (born 1984), Russian football player
- Nikolai Krivoruchko (1887–1938), Russian and Soviet soldier
- Orest Kryvoruchko (1942–2021), Ukrainian artist
- Svitlana Kryvoruchko (born 1975), Ukrainian journalist
- Yuriy Kryvoruchko (born 1986), Ukrainian chess grandmaster
- Yuriy Kryvoruchko (politician) (born 1966), Ukrainian politician
