= Bagryana =

Bagryana, Bagriana or Bahriana may refer to:

- 4400 Bagryana, an asteroid
- Elisaveta Bagryana (1893–1991), a Bulgarian poet and three-time Nobel Prize nominee

== See also ==
- Ivan Bahrianyi (1906–1963), Ukrainian writer
- Anna Bahriana (born 1981), a contemporary Ukrainian novelist, poet, playwright, and translator
