= Yuri Perohanych =

Ukrainian activist (1961-)

- Пероганич Юрій Йосипович
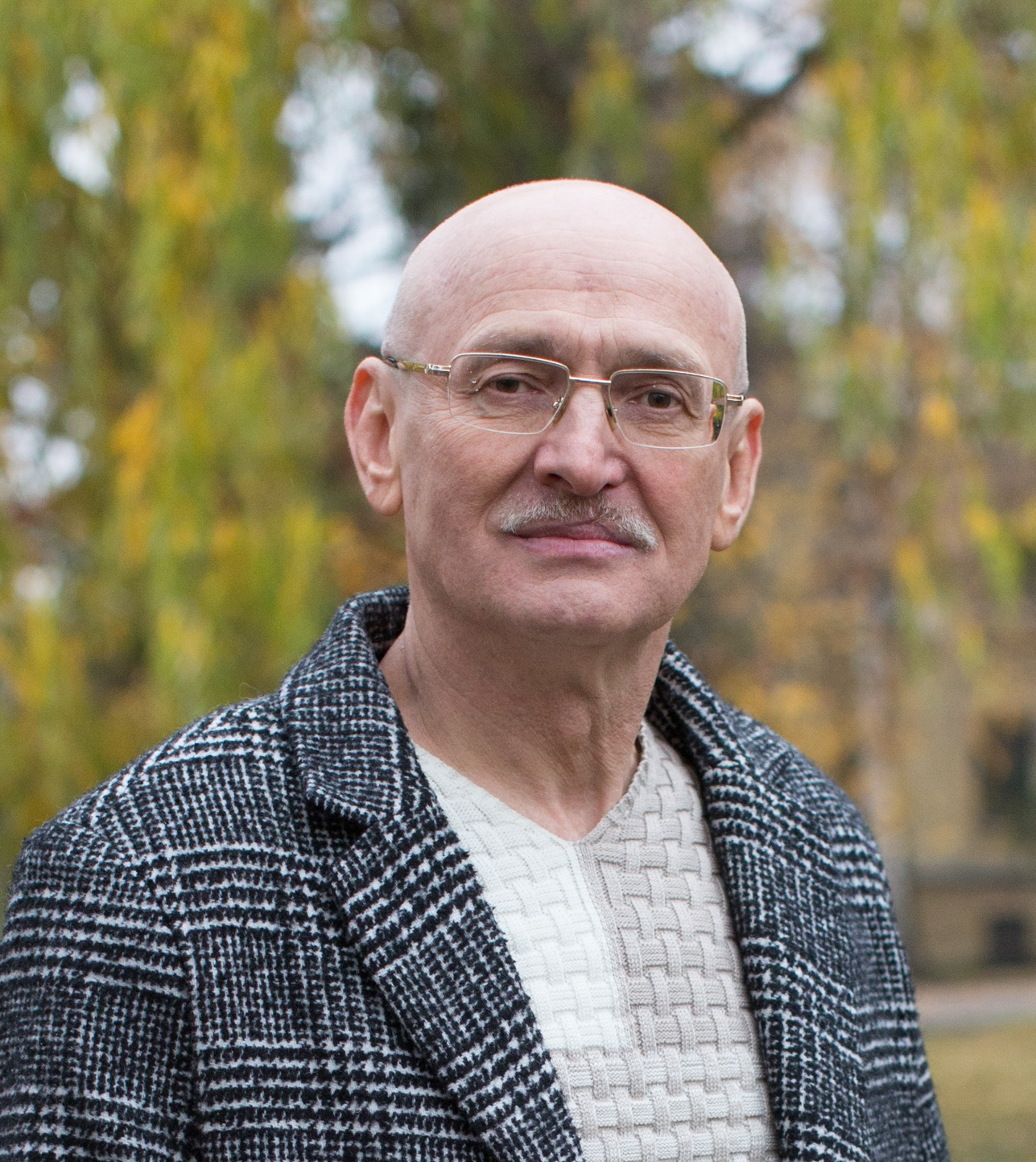
- Perohanych in 2021
- Born: July 11, 1961 (age 65); Smozhe, Lviv Oblast
- Education: Kyiv Professional College of Transport Infrastructure; Kyiv National Economic University; Taras Shevchenko National University of Kyiv.
- Spouse: Tetiana Cherep-Perohanych

Yuri Yosypovych Perohanych (Ukrainian: Ю́рій Йо́сипович Перога́нич; born 11 July 1961) is a Ukrainian writer, Wikipedia editor and activist in the sphere of information and communications technologies.

He is the co-founder of Wikimedia Ukraine and an individual member of the global Creative Commons network.

== Early life and education ==
Perohanych was born in the village of Smozhe in Lviv Oblast in the family of teachers. He graduated the Kyiv Professional College of Transport Infrastructure as a qualified technician-mathematician-programmer. Later Perohanych graduated as an engineer-economist from the Kyiv National Economic University and got his master's degree at the Institute of International Relations of the Taras Shevchenko National University of Kyiv.

== Career ==
From 1979 to 1991 Perohanych worked at the Computing Center of the Southwestern Ukrainian Railways, before being transferred to the Statistics Service of the South-Western Railway Department to the position of Deputy Head of the Service in 1992. From 1992 to 2000 he served as a Deputy Head of the Statistics Department and of the External Relations Department of Ukrzaliznytsia. Perohanych was responsible for coordinating the development and conclusion of international agreements between the Ukrainian and Polish Governments on their shared border. He prepared the Cabinet Ministers' resolution on Ukraine's accession to the Agreement on International Railway Freight Communication and the Agreement on International Passenger Railway Communication.

From 2000 to 2001, Perohanych worked as a chief consultant to the Committee on Construction, Transport and Communications of the Verkhovna Rada of Ukraine. He was also an editor of the electronic bulletin and deputy director of the publishing house "Unicon Press". In 2001–2003, he worked at the Association of International Forwarders of Ukraine as an assistant to the president for international relations. In 2003–2005, he was the head of the department of foreign economic relations at the Ministry of Transport and Communications of Ukraine. Perohanych was a member of the Ukrainian delegation to the 66th session of the Inland Transport Committee of the United Nations Economic Commission for Europe in 2004 in Geneva.

In 2009, Perohanych co-founded Wikimedia Ukraine, and served as a member of its board and executive director until 2013. From 2012 to 2014 he was a member of the Wikimedia Foundation Funds Dissemination Committee.

Perohanych has been a volunteer assistant-consultant to the People's Deputies of Ukraine Mykola Nosenko, Oleg Pankevych, Viktor Halasiuk, and as of November 2021, is a volunteer assistant-consultant to the People's Deputy of Ukraine Oleksii Zhmerenetskyi. In 2020–2022, he worked part-time as a senior lecturer at the Department of Journalism, Publishing, Printing and Editing of the Institute of Philology and Mass Communications of the university "Ukraine", specializing on the disciplines of "Media Law and Media Safety" and "New Media".

== Personal life ==
Perohanych is married to Tetiana Cherep-Perohanych, a Ukrainian writer.

== Publications ==
- Perohanych, Y. (2002). Index of terms of the Statute of the Railways of Ukraine". Scientific and practical edition. Kyiv: Osnova. p. 152. ISBN 966-7233-75-8.
- D. V. Zerkalov; V. G. Kushnirchuk; Y. Y. Perohanych, eds. (2002). Freight Forwarder's Handbook. Kyiv: Osnova.
  - Volume 1 (624 pages., ISBN 966-7233-90-1)
  - Volume 2 (528 pages., ISBN 966-699-001-6)
- "Railway Operator's Handbook". In eight books. Book One: Cargo Transportation/ Zerkalov D. V., Zayonchkovsky I. V., Perohanych Y. Y. and others. — Kyiv: Osnova, 2004. — 552 pages. ISBN 966-699-047-4
- "Final Documents of the World Summit on the Information Society". — Kyiv, 2006 / Yuriy Perohanych — arrangement and translation.
- The Road to Nowhere... and Back: Documentary, Notes, Poetry, Prose, Photos / Tetyana Cherep-Perohanych, Yuriy Perohanych. — Bila Tserkva: Chas Zmin Inform, 2025, — 168 p. + incl., ill. ISBN 978-617-8136-42-0
