= The Ukraine (book) =

2018 Ukrainian fiction and non-fiction collection

The Ukraine is a 2018 collection of short fiction and nonfiction by Ukrainian Artem Chapeye.

== Reception ==
In the Los Angeles Review of Books, Kate Tsurkan described the collection as a "heartfelt ode" to Ukraine and to the lives of ordinary Ukrainians. It was shortlisted for the 2025 EBRD Literature Prize.
