= Bank Television (Ukraine) =

Bank television (BTB) Ukrainian: Банківське телебачення (БТБ)
- Country: Ukraine

Programming
- Languages: Ukrainian, Russian

Ownership
- Owner: National Bank of Ukraine

History
- Launched: 2012.04.25
- Closed: 2015.08.01

Bank television (BTB) was a Ukrainian TV channel. It was an official television channel of the National Bank of Ukraine.

Created by the National Bank of Ukraine to improve the financial literacy of Ukrainian citizens. It is one of the first TV channels in Ukrainein which has a television production in HD. Exclusive Ukrainian partner of Bloomberg Television.

== History ==
BTB ("Bank Television" LLC) was established with a registered capital of 10 million UAH by the board of National Bank of Ukraine to information for citizens and society timely, accurate and complete information about the policy of the National Bank.

In July 2011, "Bank Television" received a satellite license. In August 2011, "Bank television" received air digital license in a national digital multiplex with the right to speak in HD ability.

Broadcasting started on 25 April 2012. Top managers: Ludmyla Obertynska (main producer), Svitlana Kryvoruchko (CEO), Svitlana Kolyada (editor-in-chief).

== See also ==
- Bloomberg Television
- Svitlana Kryvoruchko
