= Lesya Voronyna =

Ukrainian writer, translator and journalist

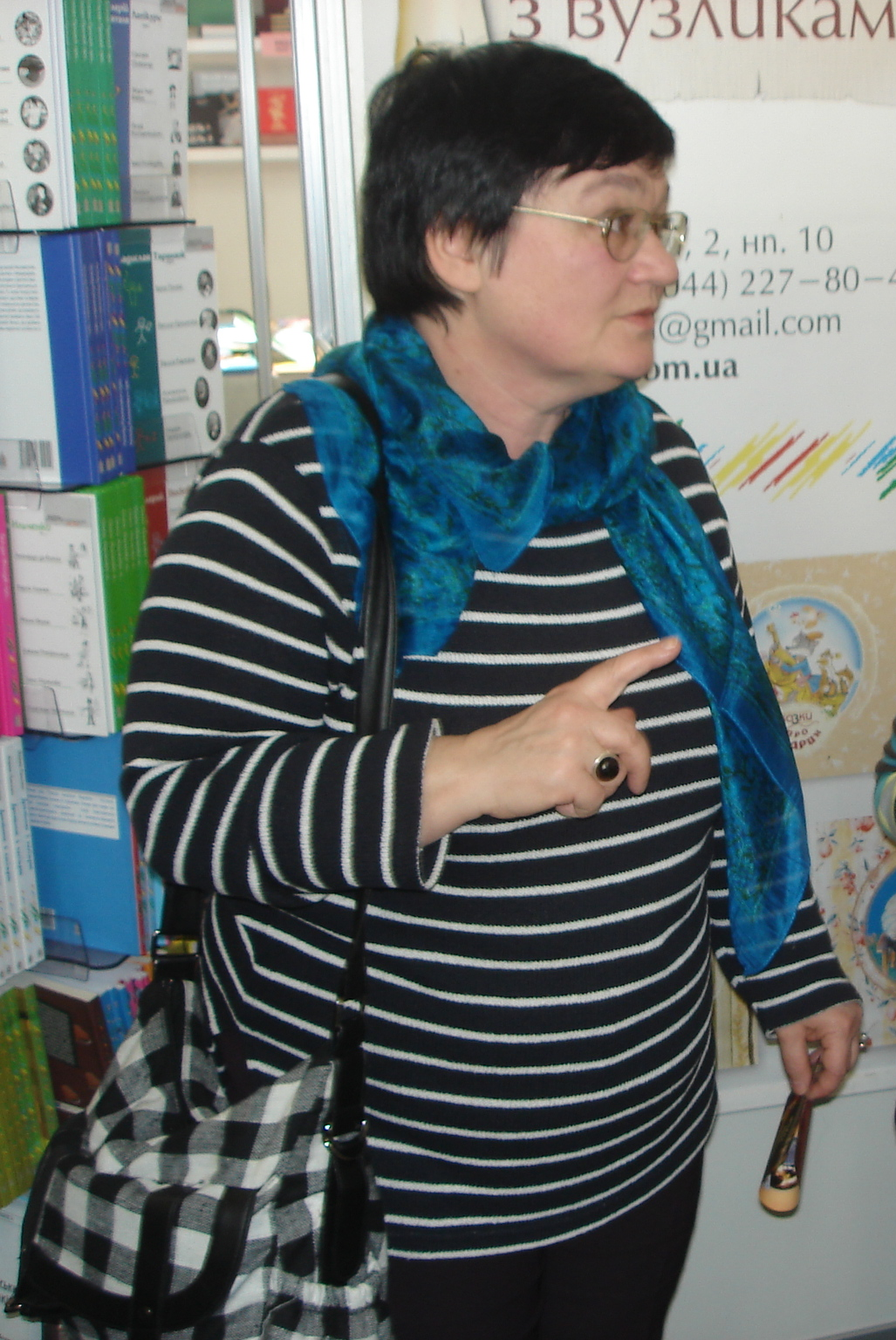
- Voronyna in 2010
- Native name: Леся Воронина
- Born: 21 March 1955 (age 71) Kyiv, Ukraine
- Occupation: Writer; journalist; translator

Olena Anastasiyivna Voronyna (Ukrainian: Олена Анастасіївна Воронина), popularly known as Lesya Voronyna (Ле́ся Воро́нина, born 21 March 1955 in Kyiv), is a Ukrainian children's book writer, translator, journalist, and member of the Association of Ukrainian Writers.

== Awards ==
In 2008, Voronyna won the "BBC Book of the Year" award for her book Нямлик і балакуча квіточка ("Nyamlyk and the Chatty Flower"). In 2009, her book Сни Ганса Християна ("Dreams of Hans Christian") won First Prize in "The Best Book of Ukraine 2009". In 2012, her book Таємне Товариство Боягузів та Брехунів ("The Secret Society of Cowards and Liars") won the "BBC Children's Book of the Year" award.

== Controversy ==
On 25 April 2025, Voronyna faced a wave of criticism on Ukrainian social media after referring to a 12-year-old boy with autism as "a creature that attracts attention to itself" during a children's books presentation in Kyiv. She later apologized for her words.

== Selected works ==
- Суперагент 000 (1996)
- Суперагент 000. Нові пригоди (2000)
- Таємниця смарагдового дракона (2001)
- Суперагент 000. Таємниця золотого кенгуру (2004)
- Таємниця пурпурової планети (2005)
- Прибулець з країни Нямликів (2007)
- Нямлик і балакуча квіточка (2008)
- Хлюсь та інші (2008)

== See also ==
- List of Ukrainian-language writers
- List of Ukrainian literature translated into English
- Ukrainian literature
