= Olexiy Yurin =

- Юрін Олексій Євгенович
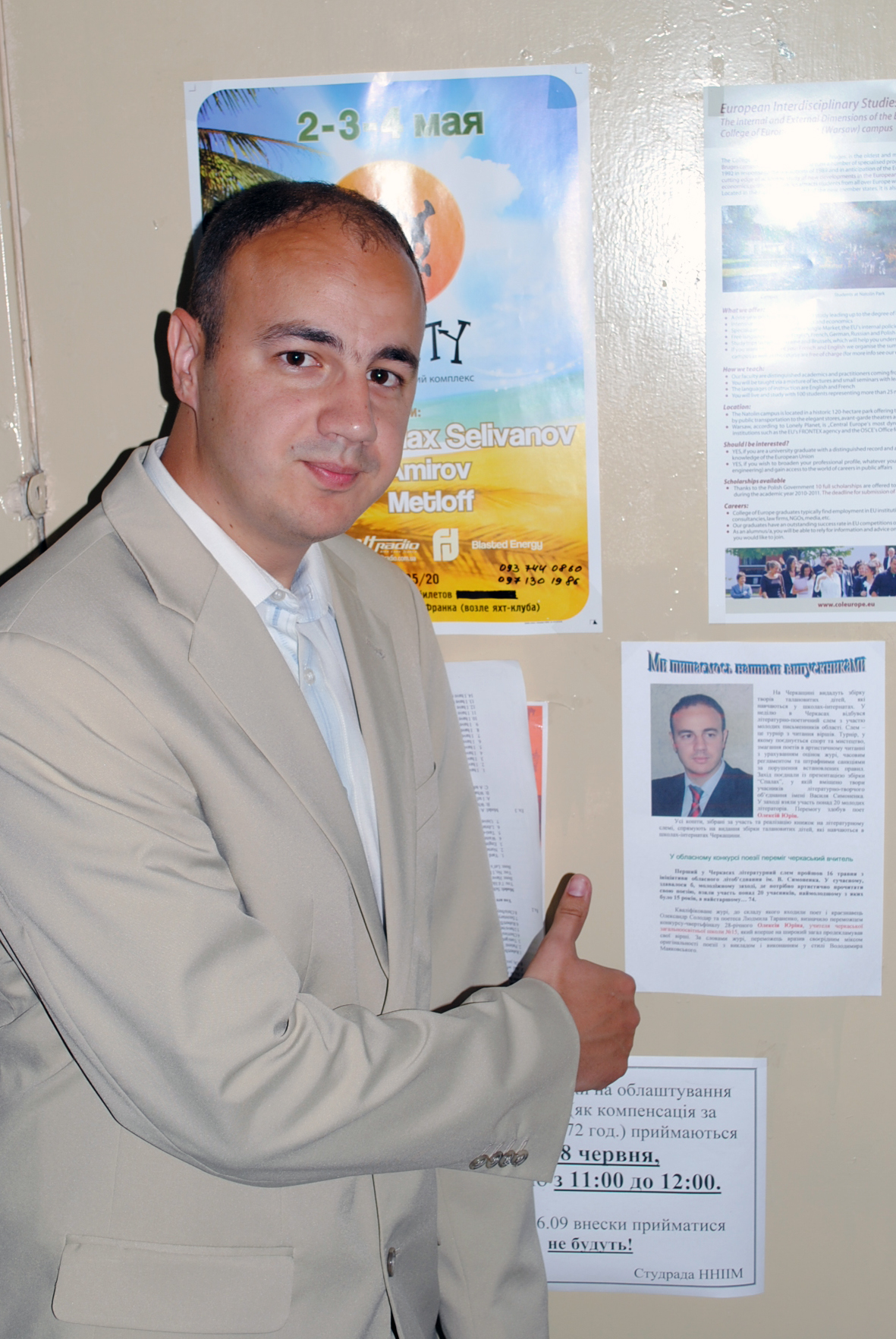
- Born: Olexiy Yevgenovych Yurin; 14 April 1982 (age 44); Cherkasy, Ukraine
- Occupations: Poet, interpreter, playwright
- Writing career
- Genres: philosophical lyrics, social realism, lyrics
- Notable works: "On Oneself", "Parampara", "Are all the women the same?", "Agia", "Where the Muses Live?", "Ambrosia", "Maria's Tango", "Hello, Jealousy", "Divine Tango"
- Notable awards: 2008 - "Слава Нації" (Nation's glory)
- Website: oye.at.ua

Olexiy Yevgenovych Yurin (Ukrainian: Юрін Олексій Євгенович; born 14 April 1982) is a Ukrainian poet, playwright, pedagogue and interpreter. His first book of poetry, On yourself, was published in 2008, and his next book, Parampara, was published in 2011. Next he wrote a collection of ironic poetry, Are all the women the same?, in 2013. He writes in Ukrainian and English.

== Life ==
Yurin was born in Cherkasy, Ukraine. He studied in the Cherkasy physical mathematical lyceum, later – at the department of the foreign languages of the Cherkasy National University by B. Khmelnytsky. Since 2004 O. Yurin is at the pedagogical work, has the first degree in teaching. He worked in the Peace Corps of the American Embassy in Ukraine. Since the end of 2013 Olexiy had been living in Bulgaria. In 2014 he came back to Ukraine. Now he works as a TV host and radio presenter in Suspilne (The Public Broadcasting Company of Ukraine) and as a teacher of English in school.

== Poetry ==
The future poet tried to write his first poems at the age of 7. In 2008 his first book of poems called On yourself was published. That year O. Yurin became the laureate of the National poetic contest “The Nation Glory”. In 2010 he won the Cherkasy regional poetic contest. In 2011 the book of poetry Parampara appeared, In 2013 - the collection of ironical poetry Are all the women the same? was published, and in March 2015 - the collection Agia, based on which a musical and poetic performance of the same name was created with the participation of actors of the Cherkasy Music and Drama Theater. In 2017, the collection Where the Muses Live?, in co-authorship with poet Lina Petlyak from Ivano-Frankivsk. The presentation took place in the Cherkasy Palace of Marriages. The poetry of O. Yurin is marked by emotiveness, philosophy, unusual images and rhymes. He writes in Ukrainian and English, poetry translated into Bulgarian and English. Yurin's poems were heard in performances of the Cherkasy Music and Drama Theater. He performed the role of Ivan Kotlyarevskyi in the play Silence and Thunder by Vasyl Simonenko. Together with the actors of the theater, he staged the musical and poetic play Fresh from Passion Fruit based on his own poetry. In 2016, he created the monologue "All living things have the right to life" based on his own biography and poetry. In the same year, he wrote the libretto for the Cherkasy Theater for the musical Maria's Tango based on the work of Astor Piazzola and Horacio Ferrer. The performance premiered on 23 June at the Cherkasy Regional Philharmonic. Olexiy translated the libretto for the opera Carmen into Ukrainian. The premiere with the participation of artists of the National Opera of Ukraine and Cherkasy Regional Symphony Orchestra was also held at the Cherkasy Regional Philharmonic. Collaborated with the Cherkasy Puppet Theater. Performed the main role in the theater play Hello, Jealousy based on the poetry of O. Yurin. The mystery Tangus dei (Divine Tango), the libretto of which was written by O. Yurin, was performed on the stage of the National Philharmonic. In 2019, the poetry collection Ambrosia was published.
