= Tetiana Cherep-Perohanych =

Ukrainian poet

- Тетяна Череп-Пероганич
- Born: November 18, 1974 (age 51); Bobrovytsia Raion, Chernihiv Oblast, Ukraine
- Citizenship: Ukraine
- Education: Taras Shevchenko National University of Kyiv
- Writing career
- Language: Ukrainian
- Period: since 1996
- Genres: poetry, novels, plays

Tetiana Pavlivna Cherep-Perohanych (18 November 1974, Stara Basan, Bobrovytsia Raion, Chernihiv Oblast, Ukraine) is a Ukrainian poet, novelist and playwright, journalist, translator, public figure, author of 15 books, member of the National Writers' Union of Ukraine, the National Union of Local Historians of Ukraine and the National Union of Journalists of Ukraine, winner of national and international awards.

== Biography ==
She attended secondary school in Stara Basan. She graduated from the Institute of Journalism of the Taras Shevchenko National University of Kyiv in 1999, specialising in journalism.

She was a communications expert for the World Bank project, editor-in-chief of the Ukrainian Culture magazine (2021-2022).

== Literary work ==
- It's raining (Ідуть дощі, 1996), a book of poems
- The Shore of Love (Берег любові, 2012), a book of poems
- Two paths from the garden (Із саду — дві стежини, 2012), a fiction-documentary novel, sketches
- Medicines for the Soul (Ліки для душі, 2013), a book of poems
- Irises for the Beloved (Іриси для коханого, 2014), etudes
- Mum's Warm Fairy Tales (Теплі мамині казки, 2014), poems for preschoolers
- Autumn of an Adult Woman (Осінь дорослої жінки, 2016), poetry, plays, works translated into other languages
- Towards the sun (Назустріч сонечку, 2017), stories for preschool and primary school age
- Boomerang (Бумеранг, 2018), Stories
- When Love Comes, or Happiness After Unhappiness (Коли приходить любов, або щастя після нещастя, 2018), a novel for middle and high school children
- Tango is not for us (Танго не для нас, 2020), a book of poems
- 20 Poems about Mum (20 віршів про маму, 2022), a book of poems
- My Angel — Kateryna Bilokur (Мій янгол — Катерина Білокур, 2023), a novel for high school children
- Happy rhymes (Щасливі віршенята, 2024), poems, lullabies for preschool and elementary school age
- The road to nowhere… and back (Дорога в нікуди… і назад, 2025), documentary, notes, poetry, prose, photos

== See also ==
- List of Ukrainian-language writers
- List of Ukrainian-language poets
- List of Ukrainian women writers
