= Viktor Grabovskyj =

Ukrainian poet

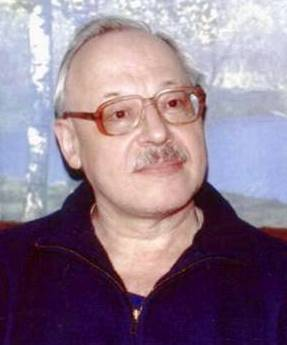
- Born: 7 November 1942 (age 83) Bagovytza, Ukraine
- Occupation: Poet, writer, translator, literary critic, journalist
- Notable awards: Awards of a name of Vladimir Sosjury and Dmitry Nitchenko

Viktor Grabovskyj (Hrabovsky or Hrabovs'ky, Ukrainian: Віктор Никанорович Грабовський; Grabovsky in Russian), (born 7 November 1942 in Bagovytza of Khmelnitsky area, Ukraine) – Ukrainian poet, writer, translator, literary critic, journalist. He is member of the National union of writers of Ukraine and the Honoured Worker of Arts of Ukraine.

== Biography ==
Viktor Grabovskyj was born on 7 November 1942 in the village of Bagovitsa in the Kamenetsky-Podolskyi region of Khmelnitsky area, Ukraine. He studied on Slavic branch of the philological faculty of the Lviv University. Since 1967 – on journalistic work. In the beginning 80 fulfilled duties of the head of department of criticism, and with 1985 for 1990 – of department publicism of the newspaper Literary Ukraine; worked as the assistant to the chief editor in the national newspapers Independent Ukraine, The Word of the Enlightenment, as the chief editor of the publishing house of the Kyiv National Economic University (KNEU) and in last time as the acting of the chief editor of Literary Ukraine.

== Awards ==
On 11 April 2007 Viktor Grabovskyj received the title of "Honored Artist of Ukraine" – a contribution to the development of Ukrainian journalism, the active defense of the ideals of freedom of speech and many years of honest work Also he is the prize winner of two literary awards: of the literary award of a name of Volodymyr Sosyura and of the International literary award of a name Dmitry Nytchenko.

== Creativity ==
Viktor Grabovskyj – the author of collections of poetry: The branches (Kyiv:"Molod’"|"Youth", 1983), Tree of a word (Kyiv: "Sovet writer"|"Radyans'kyj pysmennyk, 1987), Contemplation of a tree; Intoxicating joy (Kyiv-Nizhin: TOV "Aspect-Poligraf", 2005), Island of the Mercy (Kyiv: Publishing Center "Prosvita|Enlightenment", 2005), Song of the collector of a nectar (Kyiv: Izd KNEU, 2006), Palm Sunday (Kyiv-White Church: Publishing Center "Prosvita|Enlightenment", 2007), etc.

As example of poetry of Victor Grabovskyj, one poem written by him still in year Chernobyl catastrophe 1986 in English translation by Natalia Ryumina (2012):

Slow down, my friend!
'Be not like frozen waters,
nor like a bird that's soaring in the skies,
nor like a stone thrown down a chasm.
Slow down in your pathetic stress.
Today, right now —
instead of striving for the essence of the ozone,
you give yourself to it with all your heart,
beat by beat.
No matter where you are – in small or larger zones —
do not engage in measuring your soul,
don't rage!
When every tree branch radiates its love
in the eternal prayer to the Sun,
may no one cast a shadow from above —
not treason, and not strontium.
Don't run!
Be still, be quiet, thus remain:
if only every tiny bird,
or even little dew of pain
reflected in the eyes of the Eternal Son
with love.
Only in pure and silent inflorescence
that lies now at His feet,
you will cognize a fiery wing of parting
and an assurance that you’ve overcome and can defeat
yourself.
In that eternal struggle
that destroys – Create and form,
instead of lying still for yet another moment
like a helpless stone.

Viktor Grabovskyj is also a translator of Slavic languages. In particular he has translated from Slovak – Rudo Moric His great day (Kyiv: Veselka, 1978) from Serbian – Stevan Bulaich, Children from the Palm river (Kyiv: Veselka, 1979), for the Translation Anthology Serbo-Lusatian poetry "(Lviv:" Kamenyar, 1969); from Czech – Spring Vltava (Kyiv: "Youth", 1982); from Russian – Alexander Blok, The Scythians ("Literary Ukraine" from 24 November 2005), Yevgeny Yevtushenko Kazan University and My guest Chernobyl, Vasily Fedorov Another fire (Kyiv, Publishing House "Radyans'ka pysmennyk", 1983) and others; from Bulgarian – Let's be friends! (Kyiv-Sofіa: "Veselka" 1985); from Polish – Gustav Ehrenburg, Tomas-Aug Olizarovsky Myron Byaloshevsky et al.: An Anthology of Polish poetry in two volumes (Kyiv: "Dnipro", 1979), Karol Wojtyla (John Paul II) The Sacred object (Kyiv: "Dnipro, 2001). Interesting reflections of itself poet about personality and creativity of Karol Wojtyla in the art in the article "Love itself regulates the destiny".

Poems, translations, essays, pamphlets and literary articles by Viktor Grabovskyj entered into a number of many collective collections and were published in a lot of the literary magazines and newspapers of Ukraine.

Viktor Grabovskyj – the author of an interesting interpretation of The Tale of Igor's Campaign (Slovo o polku Ihorevim) in the modern Ukrainian language, in the study which put forward the hypothesis who was the original author of this masterpiece of ancient Ukrainian poetry (Literary Ukraine, 1985).

He is – the editor and compiler of a unique edition of the poetry of known Ukrainian poet Vasyl Stus into two languages: in Russian and Ukrainian Vasyl Stus And you same burn down, Kyiv, 2005 (with the Russian translations by known poet Lyubov Sirota).

Also Viktor Grabovskyj – one of the authors of the movie script about Chernobyl, Threshold of the famous director Rollan Sergienko, and one of the initiators of the International Annual Action "The Saved Planet", which already from the first step, 26 April 1998, found many supporters around the world.

== Books ==
- Konary / The branches: Poems. – Kyiv: Youth, 1983. – 96.
- Tree of Word: Poems. – Kyiv: Sovet writer / Radyans'kyj pysmennyk, 1987. – 94.
- P'yanka rozrada / Intoxicating joy: Poems. – Kyiv-Nizhin: TOV Aspect-Poligraf, 2005. – 100. – ISBN 966-340-037-4
- Island of the Mercy: Poems. – Kyiv: Publishing Center "Prosvita / Enlightenment", 2005. – 265. – ISBN 966-8547-41-1
- Song by the collector of nectar: Poems. – K., 2006. – 156.
- Palm Sunday. – Kyiv-White Church: Publishing Center "Prosvita / Enlightenment", 2007. – 134.
- Karol Wojtyla. Shrine – Kyiv: Dnipro, 2001. – 150. (Compiled by the author of the foreword and translator from Polish Viktor Grabovskyj) – ISBN 966-578-023-9
- Zhahalivka: Poems. – Uzhhorod: Gragda, 2011. – 232 p. – ISBN 978-966-176-047-8
- Nicanor Grabowskyj. Writing of red darkness: Private records 1980–1982 / Compiler and author of the preface Victor Grabowskyj. – Kyiv: Publishing House "Prosvita” ("Education"), 2010. – 447 p. – ISBN 978-966-2133-52-3
- No one lives for himself. Social novel about love and affection: – White Church, "Letter", 2012. . – 503 p. —ISBN 978-966-2133-88-2 (different edition)
- Love itself balances fate: Karol Wojtyla in prayer and poetry. / Victor Hrabowskyj – Kyiv: Publishing House "Prosvita” ("Education"), 2013. – 152 p. – ISBN 978-966-2133-92-9
- Victor Grabovskyj. Selected works in three volumes. – Kyiv: Publishing House "Prosvita” ("Education"), 2012. – ISBN 978-966-2133-80-6 (Volume II Economics conscience: journalism. – Kyiv: Publishing House "Prosvita” ("Education"), 2012. – 624 p. – ISBN 978-966-2133-81-3; vol II. Contemplation tree: Lyrics. Poems. Translations— Kyiv: Publishing House "Prosvita” ("Education"), 2012. – 648 p. – ISBN 978-966-2133-82-0; VOLUME III. Nobody lives for themselves: The social novel about love and Blonde. – Kyiv: Publishing House "Prosvita” ("Education"), 2012. – 576 p. – ISBN 978-966-2133-83-7)
- You – my mirror (Love and documents): Novel. – Kyiv: Publishing House of "Kyiv-Mohyla Academy", 2013. – 320 p. – ISBN 978-966-518-626-7
