= Eugene Miroshnichenko =

Russian-Ukrainian literature critic, historian, and journalist

Eugene Myroshnichenko
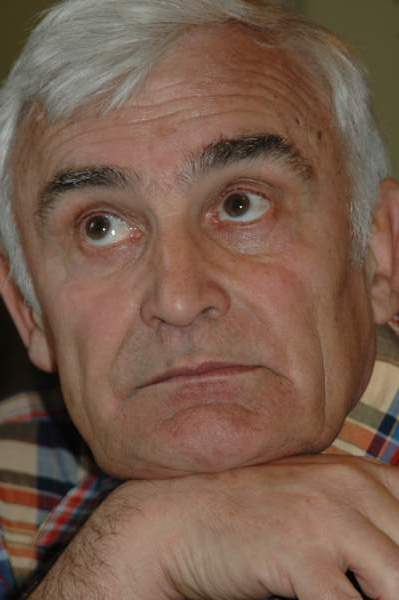
- Born: February 23, 1939 (age 86); Vitebsk, Byelorussian SSR, Soviet Union (now Belarus)
- Occupation(s): Literature critic, historian, journalist

Eugene Gordeyevich Myroshnichenko (also spelled as Yevhen Miroshnichenko, Russian: Евгений Гордеевич Мирошниченко) is a Russian-Ukrainian literature critic, historian, and journalist. In 1980, Myroshnichenko received his PhD in Russian literature from Moscow State University. His dissertation was on the role of the Literature Critic magazine in literature criticism of the 1930s.

From 1977 to 2005 Myroshnichenko was a professor at Mykolaiv State University in the southern Ukrainian city of Mykolaiv. Since 2005 he has been teaching at the Nikolaev branch of Ukraine University.

Myroshnichenko is a corresponding member of the International Cyril-Methodius Academy of Slavic Enlightenment. He is also a member of the Writers' Union of Russia and was awarded an International Prince Yuri Dolgoruki Literature Prize.

== Bibliography ==
=== Books ===
- 2008 - Literaturniy Nikolaev (putevoditel') (A Literature Guide to Nikolaev)
- 2007 - Gorod i mif (The City and a Myth)
- 2005 - Chayka nad Limanom (A Seagull over the Liman)
- 2003 - Vremya i bremya kul'tury (Time and Burden of Culture)
- 2001 - Ya zachem-to s'ezdil v Nikolaev (I happened to go to Nikolaev)
