= Artem Chapeye =

Ukrainian writer (born 1981)

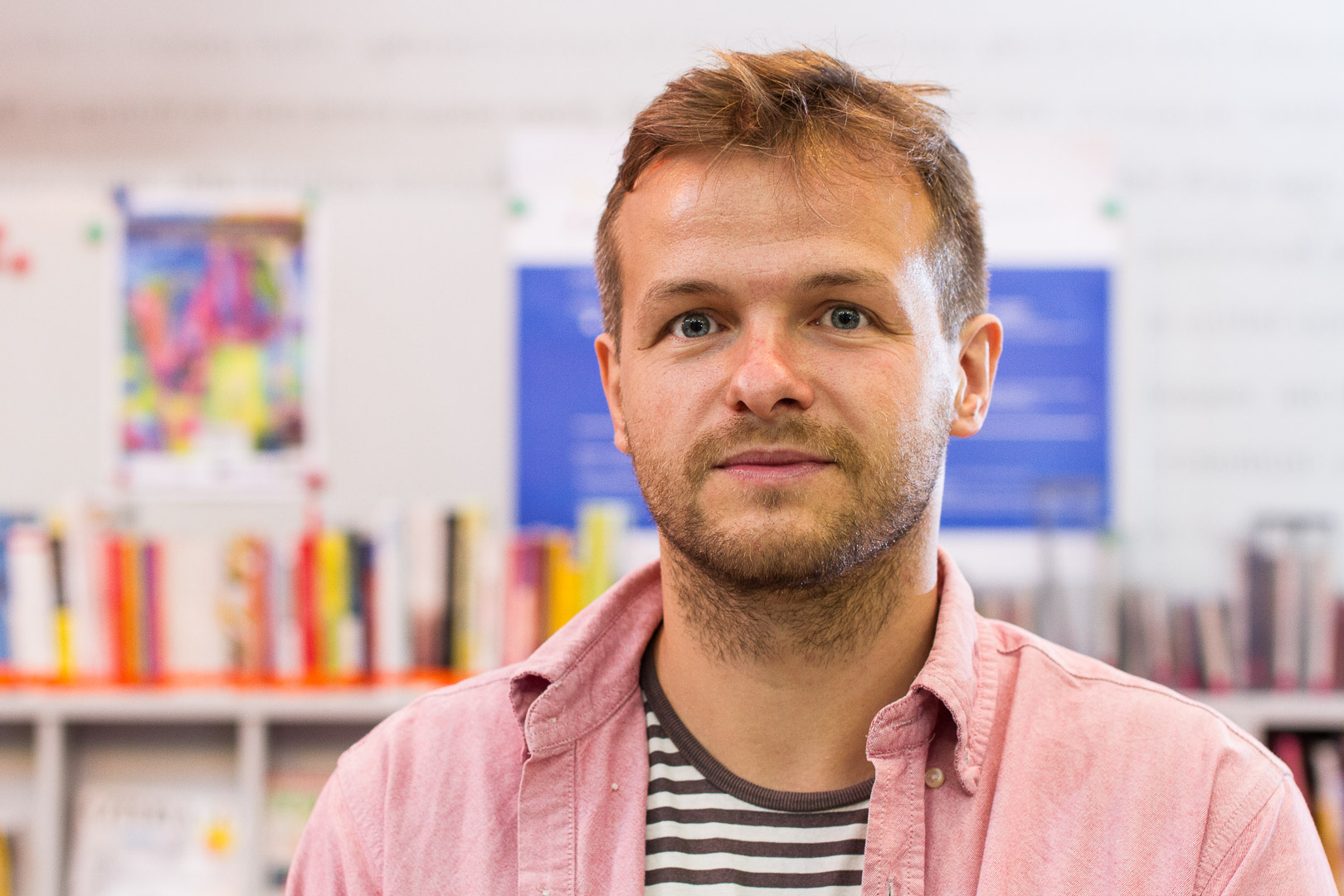
- Artem Chapeye in 2015
- Born: 2 December 1981 (age 44); Kolomyia, Ukraine
- Education: National Academy of the Security Service of Ukraine
- Alma mater: Kyiv-Mohyla Academy; Kolomyia Gymnasium
- Occupations: writer, author, photographer
- Known for: The Ukraine
- Website: https://instagram.com/artem.chapeye/

Artem Chapeye (Ukrainian: Артем Чапай), the literary pseudonym of Anton Vasilyovich Vodyanyi (Ukrainian: Антон Васильович Водяний, born 2 December 1981), is a Ukrainian writer, reporter, translator, and activist. He writes creative nonfiction as well as literary fiction. Artem is a five-time finalist of the BBC Ukraine Book of the Year Award.

== Biography ==
Artem was born and raised in Kolomyia, a small city in Western Ukraine. He spent most of his years living in Ukrainian capital Kyiv. He was one of the founders and prominent figures of the Save Old Kyiv movement against illegal construction by big developer business. After the 2022 Russian invasion of Ukraine, he evacuated his family to safety early in March, and enlisted in the Armed Forces of Ukraine. Politically, Artem supports anti-authoritarian and left-wing ideas.

== Career ==
He graduated from the Kolomyia Gymnasium in 1998. He was studying at the National Academy of the Security Service of Ukraine between 1998 and 2001, but he was forced to drop his studies during the protest campaign "Ukraine without Kuchma". He graduated with a degree in the field of philosophy from the Kyiv-Mohyla Academy in 2008. He received the Central European Initiative Fellowship for Writers in Residence in Slovenia and the Paul Celan Fellowship for Translators in Austria.

Artem had a career breakthrough when his second book Traveling with Mamayota: In Search of Ukraine (2011) was shortlisted for the BBC Ukraine Book of the Year Award. Artem was also recognised for his near-future dystopia The Red Zone (2014), There Goes the Neighborhood (2015) and The Ukraine (2018) which were also shortlisted for the BBC Ukraine Book of the Year Award.

Artem worked as a reporter covering the war in Donbas. In 2015, Artem collaborated with Kateryna Serhatskova, another Ukrainian journalist, o co-author and publish The Three Letter War, a collection of their reporting that was made in Donbas during wartime. He and Kateryna each provided three stories for the book The Three Letter War for which both of them were nominated as finalists for the Kurt Schork Award in the field of International Journalism.

His work has been translated into seven languages and has appeared in the Best European Fiction anthology. His collection of 26 essays and stories The Ukraine (the title is in English, not Ukrainian) was one of the finalists for the 2018 BBC Nonfiction Book of the Year Award. He has also translated non-fiction from English, including Humanism and Democratic Criticism by the Palestinian American intellectual Edward Said, Satyagraha in South Africa by the Indian anti-colonial leader Mahatma Gandhi, and The Responsibility of Intellectuals by the American linguist Noam Chomsky. After the 2022 Russian invasion of Ukraine, he volunteered for the army.
