= Yaroslav Oros =

- Born: April 18, 1959 (age 67) village Shyroky Lug, Ukraine

Yaroslav Oros (Ukrainian: Ярослав Орос) (born April 18, 1959, village Shyroky Lug, the west of Ukraine) is a writer and journalist. He graduated from the Storozhynets College of Forestry in 1978 and the journalism department of National Taras Shevchenko University of Kyiv in 1986.

Oros is the first recipient of the International Literature Prize “Granoslov-91” for his novel «Змагання катів» (“Fight of executioners”, 1992) . He worked as chief editor of the newspapers “Personal plus”(“Staff Plus”), “Ukrainska Gazeta”(“Ukrainian Newspaper”) and as the director of the magazine “Knyzhkovy Klub +”(“Book Club+”). Y.Oros was the author of the Ukrainian radio program “Chetverty Universal”(“The Fourth Universal”). He founded book series "Class Literature" in publishing house "Znannia" ("Knowledge").

== Bibliography ==
- 1991 – «Заповіти білих горватів» (“Testaments of White Croats”)
- 1992 – «Змагання катів» (“Fight of executioners”)
- 1995 – «Чотирикутна зірка. Арійські притчі» (“Quadrangular star. Aryan parables”)
- 1999 – «Кощуни. Хроніки волхва» (“Koshchuny. The Magi Chronicles”)
- 2001 – «Модуль Яфета» (“Modulus of Japheth”)
- 2006 – «Заповіти білих горватів» (2-ге вид., доповнене) (“Testaments of White Croats”, 2nd supplemented edition)
- 2009 – «Врата Сiмаргла» (“Gates of Simargl”)
- 2009 – «Яфет і Хам» (“Japheth and Ham”)
- 2011 – «Триликий Ной» (“Threefaced Noah”)
- 2012 – «Дримба» (“Jaw harp”)
- 2017 – «Витівки Ярґа» (“Brainchildren of Yarg”)
- 2019 - «Чара» (“Chara”)
- 2021 - «Чиненик» (“Chinenyk”)
- 2023 - "На порозі війни" ("At the threshold of war")
- 2025 - "Тесла покохав Чорногору" (Tesla fell in love with Chornohora)
