= Svitlana Kryvoruchko =

Ukrainian journalist

Svitlana Volodymyrivna Kryvoruchko (Ukrainian: Світлана Володимирівна Криворучко; born 21 November 1975) is a Ukrainian journalist, CEO in BTB and Kyiv TV channels. Merited Journalist of Ukraine.

== Biography ==
=== Early years. Education ===
Svitlana Kryvoruchko was born on 21 November 1975 in Poltava.

In 1998 graduated from the Institute of Journalism of the Taras Shevchenko National University of Kyiv. Candidate of philological sciences.

=== Career ===
- During 1995-1996 was editorial office chief of the newspaper «City»
- During 1996-1998 was editor of program «Daily Chronicle» (Ukrainian Independent TV Corporation)
- Since 1998 she has worked as a leading specialist of press service in Kyiv City State Administration. Since 2001 became head of the department.
- During 2007-2010 she served as Director of information and broadcasting journalistic in Kyiv TV channel
- On 20 December 2010, appointed CEO of Kyiv TV channel
- On 14 February 2012, appointed CEO of "Bank television"

== State awards ==
- Merited Journalist of Ukraine (since 13 November 2011)
