= Anna Bahriana =

Ukrainian writer and translator

Anna Bahriana Анна Багряна
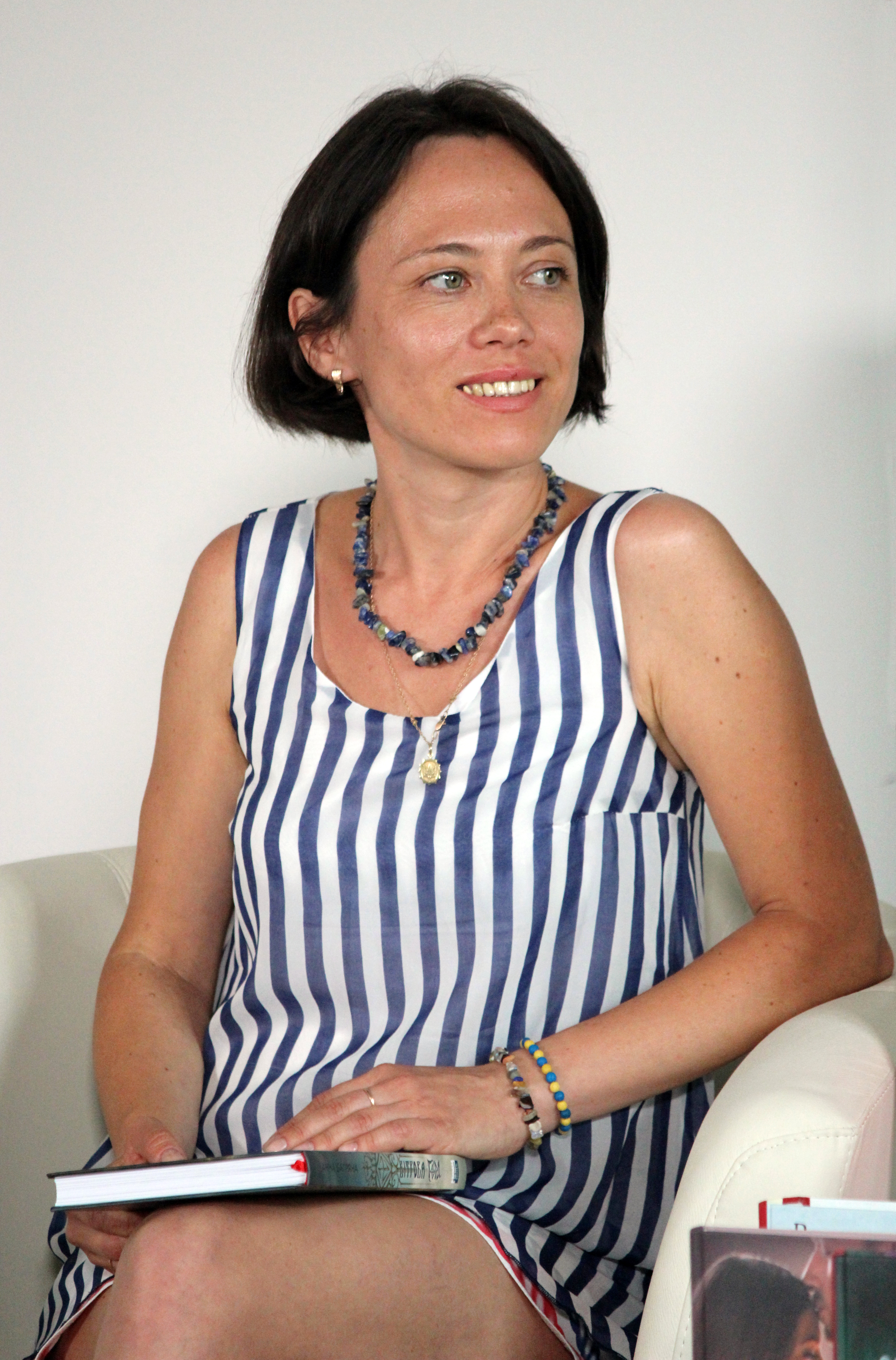
- Born: March 24, 1981 (age 45); Fastiv, Ukraine
- Citizenship: Ukraine
- Occupations: Poet and Translator

Anna Bahriana or Ваhryana (Ukrainian: Анна Багряна) (born March 24, 1981) is a Ukrainian novelist, poet, playwright, and translator.

== Biography ==
Bahriana was born on March 24, 1981, in the city of Fastiv, Kyiv Oblast. She graduated from the Language Institute of Taras Shevchenko National University of Kyiv in Ukrainian language and literature. Following this, she worked as a radio and television journalist. Currently, she is a member of the National Writer's Union of Ukraine, the Association of Ukrainian Writers, and the Slavic Academy of Literature and the Arts (Bulgaria).

Bahriana has published seven books of poetry, two collections of plays and three novels: "The Etymology of Blood" (Kyiv, 2008), "Such a Strange Love This is" (Kyiv 2010), and "The Pesterer" (Kyiv, 2012). She has also compiled and translated an anthology of contemporary poetry from the North Macedonia. Her novel, "Such a Strange Love This is" was translated into Macedonian. Her collection of dramatic pieces, "Plays," has been translated into Macedonian and Serbian (Štip, North Macedonia, 2011; Smederevo, Serbia, 2012).

== Books ==
=== Ukraine ===
Poems:

- The floscule of words. (Суцвіття слів). Poems. – Kyiv.: Prosvita. – 2000. – 94 p. ISBN 966-7551-32-6.
- Among lilac dreams. (Поміж бузкових снів). Poems. – Kyiv.: JUANA. – 2002. – 124 p. ISBN 966-95909-1-4.
- Between gods and us. (Між богами і нами). Poems. – Kyiv.: JUANA. – 2005. – 116 p. ISBN 966-95909-4-9.
- Walking a tightrope (Мандрівка линвою / Spacer po linie). Poems, translations. In Ukrainian and Poland. In collaboration whis Voicheh Pestka. Lviv-Radom: Kamenyar. – 2008. – 94 p. ISBN 978-5-7745-1064-1.
- Other lines. (Інші лінії). Poems. – Kyiv.: Prosvita. – 2009. – 200 p. ISBN 978-966-2133-20-2.
- The spell of love. (Замовляння із любові). Poems. – Luck.: Tverdynia. – 2011. – 84 p. ISBN 978-617-517-070-0.

Prose:

- The Etymology of Blood (Етимологія крові). Novel. – Kyiv.: Fact.– 2008. – 156 p. ISBN 978-966-359-296-1.
- Anna Bahriana about Maria Zankovetska, Olena Teliha, Vanga, Maria Prymachenko, Slava Stetsko: stories. For Children. (Анна Багряна про Марію Заньковецьку, Олену Телігу, Вангу, Марію Примаченко, Славу Стецько). – Kyiv.: Grani-T., 2010. – 96 p. (series "Living outstanding children"). ISBN 978-966-465-266-4.
- Such a Strange Love This is. (Дивна така любов). Novel-sonata. – Kyiv.: Nora-druk. - 2010. – 208 p. (series "Popular Books"). ISBN 978-966-2961-53-9.
- The Pesterer. (Дошкуляка). Novel. – Kyiv.: Nora-druk. – 2012. – 216 p. (series "Popular Books"). ISBN 978-966-2961-90-4.

Translations:

- Risto Vasilevski. The Temple and the Temple still (Храм, справді, храм). Poems. Compiler and translator from Macedonian: Anna Bahriana. – Luck.: Tverdynia. – 2011. – 148 p. (series "Modern Balkan poetry"). ISBN 978-617-517-091-5.
- Dimitar Hristov. Across the border. (Крізь кордони). Poems. Compiler and translator from Bulgarian: Anna Bahriana. – Luck.: Tverdynia. – 2012. – 64 p. (series "Modern Balkan poetry"). ISBN 978-617-517-103-5.
- Jeton Kelmendi. On the top of the time. (На верхів’ї часу). Poems. Compiler and translator from Albanian: Anna Bahriana. – Luck.: Tverdynia. – 2012. – 40 p. (series "Modern Balkan poetry"). ISBN 978-617-517-124-0.

Performances of plays and libretti:

- "Beyond Time" (dramatic poem) at the ERA Drama Theater (Kyiv) in 2006 and the Premiera Music & Drama Studio (Kyiv) in 2009
- "Gloria" (a musical) at the Donetsk National Ukrainian Academic Theater of Music and Drama, 2010
- "Rhododendron" (a tragicomedy in two acts) at the Homin Ukrainian Drama Theater (Chicago) in 2010

=== Poland ===
Poems:

- Create me in your dreams... (Wysnij mnie...). Translator from Ukrainian: Voicheh Pestka. – Częstochowa.: Leterackie Towarzystwo Wzaimniej Adoracji "Li-TWA". – 2008. – 39 p. ISBN 978-83-89108-79-1.

=== Azerbaijan ===
Poems:

- Two grains of sand (IKI ỌUM DƏNƏS). – Translators from Ukrainian: Elchin Iskenderzade, Arzu Huseinova. – Baku.: "Vektor" Nәşrlәr Evi. – 2009. – 72 p.

=== Bulgaria ===
Poems:

- The anchor for two (Котва за двама). Translator from Ukrainian: Dimitar Hristov. – Varna.: Slavic literary and artistic Academy. – 2011. – 80 p. ISBN 978-954-2930-02-0.

Translations:

- Two Bahriana's in Eternal and Holy (Двете Багряни във ВЕЧНАТА И СВЯТАТА). (bilingual Bulgarian-Ukrainian edition of poems of Elisaveta Bahriana, compiler and translator from Bulgarian: Anna Bahriana). – Varna.: Slavic literary and artistic Academy. – 2009. – 112 p. ISBN 978-954-92402-3-8.
- Dora Gabe. Sun, wait! (Сонце, почекай! / Почакай, слънце!). (Bilingual Bulgarian-Ukrainian edition, compiler and translator from Bulgarian: Anna Bahriana). – Varna.: Slavic literary and artistic Academy. – 2012. – 112 p. ISBN 978-954-2930-06-8.

=== North Macedonia ===
Dramaturgy:

- Plays. (Пиеси). Translators from Ukrainian: Dimitar Hristov, Vasil Mihailov, Ilia Arev, Trajche Kacarov. – Shtip. – 2011. – 120 p. ISBN 978-9989-9918-9-9.

Prose:

- Such a Strange Love This is. (Толку необична љубов). Novel-sonata. Translator from Ukrainian: Vera Chornyi-Meshkova. – Skopje.: MATICA. – 2011. – 118 p. ISBN 978-608-10-0169-3.

Poems:

- The tabouret. (Ѓерѓеф). Translator from Ukrainian: Vesna Acevska, Vera Chornyi-Meshkova. – Kochani. – 2012. – 48 p. ISBN 978-608-65280-4-1.

Translations:

- Modern Poetry of Republic of Macedonia. Anthology. Compiler and translator from Macedonian: Anna Bahriana. – Skopje. – Feniks. – 2012. – 160 p. (Series "Aura"). ISBN 978-9989-33-609-6.

=== Serbia ===
Dramaturgy:

- Plays (Комади). Translator from Ukrainian: Risto Vasilevski. – Smederevo.: Arka. – 2012. – 127 p. (Series "Scene"). ISBN 978-86-7610-126-9.

Poems:

- The Scythian woman (Скитска дева / Скіфська діва). Translator from Ukrainian: Vera Horvat. – Smederevo: Smederovo's Poet Autumn. – Meridijani. – 2012. – 80 p. ISBN 978-86-6255-013-2.

=== Belgium ===
Poems:

- The anchor (L'Ancre): Poems / Translator from Ukrainian: Dmytro Tchystiak. - Brussels: L'Esprit des Aigles, 2012, 40 p. ISBN 978-2-87485-012-7.

== Honors, awards and prizes ==
- The Ukrainian-German International Honchar Prize, 3rd place in the 2008 Crowning the Word competition, and 2nd Prize in the 2008 Smoloskyp Competition for her novel, "The Etymology of Blood."
- The 2009 "Silver Flying Pen" International Award Literary (Bulgaria) for her translation of a book of poetry by Elizaveta Bagriana.
- Winner of the 2009 Marusia Beck Literary Prize (WFUWO, Canada) for her short story, "Green Borshch."
- The Award of International Mediterranean Academy (R.Macedonia, 2012).
- The "Qiriu i Naimit" International Award Literary (R.Macedonia – R.Kosovo, 2012) for specific values of poetry.
