= List of Ukrainian literature translated into English =

This is a list of notable works of Ukrainian literature that have been translated into English.

This is a dynamic list and may never be able to satisfy particular standards for completeness. You can help by adding missing items with reliable sources.

| Original author | Translation title | Original title | Genre | First published | Translator | Publisher | Date | ISBN |
|---|---|---|---|---|---|---|---|---|
| Victoria Amelina | Looking at Women Looking at War: A War and Justice Diary | Щоденник війни і правосуддя: Дивлячись на жінок, що дивляться на війну | Non-fiction | 2025 | Daisy Gibbons, Uilleam Blacker | St. Martin's Publishing Group | 2025 | 978-1-250-36768-6 |
| Emma Andijewska | A Novel about a Good Person | Роман про добру людину | Novel | 1973 | Olha Rudakevych | Harvard University Press | 2018 | 978-1-894865-49-4 |
| Yuri Andrukhovych | The Moscoviad | Московіада | Novel | 1992 | Vitaly Chernetsky | Spuyten Duyvil | 2008 | 978-1933132525 |
| Sofia Andrukhovych | Felix Austria | Фелікс Австрія | Novel | 2014 | Vitaly Chernetsky | Harvard University Press | 2014 | 978-0674291393 |
| Stanislav Aseyev | In Isolation | В ізоляції | Non-fiction | 2018 | Lidia Wolanskyj | Harvard University Press | 2020 | 978-0-674-26879-1 |
| Mykola Bazhan | Quiet Spiders of The Hidden Soul. Mykola (Nik) Bazhan’s Early Experimental Poetry. | Із прірв свідомості: Рання експериментальна поезія Миколи (Ніка) Бажана | Poetry | 1920s | Oksana Rosenblum, Lev Fridma, Anzhelika Khyzhny | Academic Studies Press | 2020 | 978-1-64469-395-7 |
| Natalka Bilotserkivets | Eccentric Days of Hope and Sorrow | Ексцентричні дні надії та скорботи | Poetry | 2021 | Ali Kinsella, Dzvinia Orlowsky | Lost Horse Press | 2021 | 978-1-7364323-2-7 |
| Artem Chapeye | The Ukraine | The Ukraine | Collection of fiction and non-fiction | 2018 | Zenia Tompkins | Seven Stories Press | 2024 | 978-1644212950 |
| Artem Chapeye | The Weathering | Вивітрювання | Novel | 2021 | Daisy Gibbons | Seven Stories Press | 2026 | 978-1-911710-32-5 |
| Artem Chekh | Rock, Paper, Grenade | Хто ти такий? | Novel | 2021 | Olena Jennings, Oksana Rosenblum | Seven Stories Press | 2025 | 978-1644214275 |
| Yaryna Chornohuz | Nobody's Saffron | Нічийний шафран | Poetry | 2025 | Amelia M. Glaser | Arrowsmith Press | 2026 | 979-8-9915254-0-4 |
| Lyubko Deresh | Medusa's Gaze: A Little Book of Darkness | Погляд Медузи. Маленька книга пітьми. | Novel | 2024 | Dmytro Kyyan, Kate Tsurkan | Academic Studies Press | 2026 | 979-8-89783-278-1 |
| Oleksander Dovzhenko | The Enchanted Desna | Зачарована Десна | Autobiographical novel | 1956 | Ali Kinsella, Dzvinia Orlowsky | Lost Horse Press | 2026 | 979-8-9890965-5-8 |
| Artur Dron | We Were Here | Тут були ми | Poetry | 2023 | Yuliya Musakovska | Jantar Publishing | 2024 | 978-1-914990-26-7 |
| Artur Dron | Hemingway Knows Nothing | Гемінґвей нічого не знає | Non-fiction | 2025 | Hanna Leliv | Jantar Publishing | 2026 | 978-3-948259-37-2 |
| Yuliia Iliukha | My Women | Мої жінки | Short story collection | 2024 | Hanna Leliv | 128 LIT | 2024 | 979-8-9884471-1-5 |
| Markiyan Kamysh | Stalking the Atomic City: Life Among the Decadent and the Depraved of Chornobyl | Оформляндія або прогулянка в Зону | Novel | 2015 | Hanna Leliv, Reilly Costigan-Humes | Pushkin Press | 2022 | 978-1-78227-855-9 |
| Pavlo Kazarin | The Wild West of Eastern Europe | Дикий Захід Східної Європи | Non-fiction | 2021 | Dominique Hoffman | ibidem Press | 2024 | 978-3-8382-1842-7 |
| Iya Kiva | Silence Dressed in Cyrillic Letters | - | Poetry | - | Amelia M. Glaser, Yuliya Ilchuk | Harvard University Press | 2026 | 978-0674300996 |
| Andriy Kokotiukha | The Lawyer from Lychakiv Street | Адвокат iз Личакiвської | Novel | 2015 | Yuri Tkacz | Glagoslav Publications | 2020 | 978-1-912894-96-3 |
| Mykhailo Kotsiubynsky | At a High Cost | Дорогою ціною | Novel | 1901 | Nataliya Krynytska | UCL Press | 2018 | 978-1-9830-2067-4 |
| Borys Khersonskyi | Queen Saturday | Цариця Субота | Poetry | 2016 | Svetlana Lavochkina, Oksana Rosenblum | Washington State University Press | 2026 | 979-8-9890965-6-5 |
| Oksana Lutsyshyna | Ivan and Phoebe | Іван і Феба | Novel | 2019 | Nina Murray | Deep Vellum | 2023 | 978-1646052622 |
| Maria Matios | Sweet Darusya: A Tale of Two Villages | Солодка Даруся | Novel | 2003 | Michael M. Naydan, Olha Tytarenko | Spuyten Duyvil Publishing | 2019 | 978-1-947980-93-8 |
| Oleksandr Mykhed | The Language of War | Позивний для Йова. Хроніки вторгнення. | Non-fiction | 2024 | Maryna Gibson, Hanna Leliv,Abby Dewa | Penguin | 2024 | 978-0-241-69084-0 |
| Valerian Pidmohylnyi | The City | Місто | Novel | 1928 | Maxim Tarnawsky | Harvard Ukrainian Research Institute | 2025 | 978-0674291126 |
| Taras Prokhasko | Earth Gods | Непрості | Novel | 2002 | Ali Kinsella, Uilleam Blacker, Mark Andryczyk | Harvard Ukrainian Research Institute | 2025 | 978-0674291164 |
| Maksym Rylsky | The Selected Lyric Poetry of Maksym Rylsky | Вибрана лірика Максима Рильського | Poetry | | Michael M. Naydan | Glagoslav Publications | 2017 | 978-1-911414-41-4 |
| Taras Shevchenko | Kobzar | Кобзар | Poetry collection | 1840 | Peter Fedynsky | Glagoslav Publications | 2013 | 978-1909156548 |
| Olena Stiazhkina | Cecil the Lion Had to Die | Смерть лева Сесіла мала сенс | Novel | 2021 | Dominique Hoffman | Harvard Ukrainian Research Institute | 2024 | 978-0674291645 |
| Volodymyr Svidzinsky | Evasive Shadow of Life: Selected Poems | Невловима тінь життя | Poetry | 2017 | Bohdan Boychuk, Bohdan Rubchak | Canadian Institute of Ukrainian Studies Press | 2017 | 978-1-894865-46-3 |
| Pavlo Tychyna | The Complete Early Poetry Collections | Повне зібрання ранніх поетичних збірок | Poetry | 1920s | Michael M. Naydan | Glagoslav Publications | 2020 | 978-1-911414-20-9 |
| Lesia Ukrainka | The Forest Song: A Fairy Play | Лісова пісня | Poetic play | 1911 | Virlana Tkacz, Wanda Phipps | Harvard Ukrainian Research Institute | 2025 | 978-0674291881 |
| Oles Ulianenko | Stalinville | Сталінка | Novel | 1994 | Olha Rudakevych | Harvard Ukrainian Research Institute | 2026 | 978-0-674-30763-6 |
| Oksana Zabuzhko | Fieldwork in Ukrainian Sex | Польові дослідження з українського сексу | Novel | 1996 | Halyna Hryn | Amazon Crossing | 2011 | 978-1611090086 |
| Oksana Zabuzhko | The Museum of Abandoned Secrets | Музей покинутих секретів | Novel | 2009 | Nina Murray | Amazon Crossing | 2012 | 978-1611090116 |
| Serhiy Zhadan | Voroshilovgrad | Ворошиловград | Novel | 2010 | Reilly Costigan-Humes, Isaac Wheeler | Deep Vellum Publishing | 2016 | 978-1941920305 |
| Volodymyr Rafeyenko | Signals of Being, or Verbum Caro Factum Est: A Play in Three Acts | Мобільні хвилі буття | Play | 2022 | Mark Andryczyk | Harvard Ukrainian Research Institute | 2025 | 978-0674302631 |
| Yuriy Vynnychuk | Tango of Death | Танґо смерті | Novel | 2012 | Michael M. Naydan, Olha Tytarenko | Spuyten Duyvil Publishing | 2019 | 978-1-949966-33-6 |
| Yuriy Vynnychuk | The Night Reporter: A 1938 Lviv Murder Mystery | Нічний репортер | Novel | 2019 | Michael M. Naydan, Alla Perminova | Glagoslav Publications B.V. | 2021 | 978-1-914337-30-7 |
| Lyuba Yakimchuk | Apricots of Donbas | Абрикоси Донбасу | Poetry | 2015 | Svetlana Lavochkina, Oksana Maksymchuk, Max Rosochinsk | Lost Horse Press | 2021 | 978-1-7364323-1-0 |
| Maik Yohansen | Dr. Leonardo’s Journey to Sloboda Switzerland with His Future Lover, the Beautiful Alcesta | Подорож ученого доктора Леонардо і його майбутньої коханки прекрасної Альчести у Слобожанську Швайцарію | Novel | 1928 | Uilleam Blacker | Harvard University Press | 2026 | 978-0-674-29195-9 |
| Joseph Zissels | Consider My Inmost Thoughts. Essays, Lectures, and Interviews on Ukrainian Matters at the Turn of the Century. | Розсуди мої помисли | Essays, Lectures, and Interviews | 2021 | Zinaida Averina | ibidem Press | 2025 | 978-3838219752 |
| Serhiy Zhadan | The Orphanage | Інтернат | Novel | 2017 | Reilly Costigan-Humes, Isaac Stackhouse Wheeler | Yale University Press | 2021 | 978-0-300-24301-7 |
| Serhiy Zhadan | A Harvest Truce | Хлібне перемир'я | Play | 2020 | Nina Murray | Harvard University Press | 2024 | 978-0-674-29201-7 |

== See also ==
- Contemporary Ukrainian literature
