= List of paintings by Emma Andijewska =

Emma Andijewska is a Ukrainian poet, prose writer, and painter whose work is often associated with surrealism. She has produced many thousands of paintings over several decades, with her visual work noted for brightly coloured, phantasmagoric compositions inhabited by fantastical creatures and transformed everyday objects. This page lists a selection of Andijewska's paintings that have appeared in catalogues, auction records, and museum publications.

Andijewska has created many thousands of works; biographical and museum sources cite figures ranging from more than 9,000 to over 17,000 paintings. Some of her paintings are documented in independently published catalogues, often issued in small print runs at the artist's expense and without standard ISBN data. Her works are generally signed on the front with the initials E. A. and on the reverse with her name and the title of the painting in Ukrainian, and sometimes also in German, as reflected in several catalogue titles.

== Paintings ==
The following table summarizes selected paintings by Emma Andijewska as attested in catalogues, museum exhibition material, and auction records.

Year	Title
1988	Cosmogonic pair on a small shade — Siesta on yellow
1989	Two at the crossroads
1990	Plate with fish, paper, watercolor — Head, 25×32, paper, acrylic — Shared barriers, paper, watercolor — In the garden, 50×40, paper, acrylic
1991	Paris, Châtelet, 50×64, paper, acrylic — Pair, 69×50, canvas, oil — Walk in the park, 60×69, canvas, oil — The one who plants flowers, 60×69, canvas, oil — Figure with berries, 69×50, canvas, oil
1992	Figure with two hats, 69×50, canvas, oil
1993	Series Signs of the Zodiac — series Tarot — Figure with French bread, 50×64, paper, acrylic — Strength, 50×64, paper, acrylic
1994	Oktoberfest, 50×64, paper, acrylic — The one who fries soap bubbles, 50×64, paper, acrylic — Carnival, 50×64, paper, acrylic — Meditation on the theme of potatoes, 50×64, paper, acrylic — Flowers, 50×64, paper, acrylic
1995	Music, 80×108, paper, acrylic — South, 80×108, paper, acrylic — Flowers and insects, 80×100, cardboard, acrylic
1996	South, 80×108, paper, acrylic
1997	Venice, 80×108, paper, acrylic — Voices of the ancestors, 80×108, paper, acrylic
1998	Album Language of Dream = Segments — Flowers, 80×108, paper, acrylic — Bakery, 80×108, paper, acrylic — Two with a trumpet, 80×108, paper, acrylic — Sarastro from 'The Magic Flute', 54×80, paper, acrylic
1999	Golden crucifixion on a beige cross, 80×108, paper, acrylic — Two with a fish and insects, 80×108, paper, acrylic — South, 80×108, paper, acrylic — Memory, 80×108, paper, acrylic — Territory, 80×108, paper, acrylic
2000	Family, 80×108, paper, acrylic — Umbrellas, 80×108, paper, acrylic — Bridges, 80×108, paper, acrylic — Jungle, 80×108, paper, acrylic — Problem of the head, 39×54, paper, acrylic
2001	Warrior and insect, 80×108, paper, acrylic — Breakfast, 76×107, paper, acrylic — Visitors, 200×133, paper, acrylic — Over tea, 80×108, paper, acrylic — Invitation, 200×133, paper, acrylic
2002	Self-portrait, 40×50, newspaper paper, acrylic — 1001 Nights, 40×50, newspaper paper, acrylic — Ars amandi, 29×40, newspaper paper, acrylic — Crucifixion, 200×133, paper, acrylic — Kiss, 200×133, paper, acrylic — Birth of Kozak Mamai, 133×200, paper, acrylic
2004	Chernobyl, 140×100, canvas, acrylic

== Catalogues ==
Several catalogues and albums devoted to Emma Andijewska's paintings have been published in Germany and Ukraine since the early 1990s. Many of these are exhibition catalogues that reproduce paintings, sometimes with essays by critics and curators, and were issued in limited print runs.

Cover	Year	Title
	1993	Die Gemälden / Emma Andijewska. [Germany: s.n., 1993]. No pagination: ill.
	1994	Emma Andijewska / Emma Andijewska. [Munich: s.n., 1994]. [unpaged]: ill. Title of painting on cover: Blumen in der gelben Teekanne und Insekten.
	1995	Emma Andijewska / Emma Andijewska. [Munich]: [s.n.], [1995]. 64 p.: ill. Title of painting on cover: Hinter dem Rad.
	1996	Emma Andijewska / Emma Andijewska. Munich: s.n., 1996. 126 p.: ill. Title of painting on cover: Solokonstruktion.
	1997	Emma Andijewska / text by Vladimir Grigorjevic Besnosow; translation by Tom Kraft. Munich: Emma Andijewski, 1997. 128 p.: col. ill.; 24 cm.
	1998	Emma Andijewska / Emma Andijewska. [Munich: Tom Kraft], 1998. 160 p.: ill.
	1999	Emma Andijewska. Painting. Catalogue / Emma Andijewska; texts by G. A. Prasdnikow, W. Langsfeld. Munich, 1999. 163 p.: ill.
	2000	Emma Andijewska / ed. M. Marychevsky. Kyiv: Editorial office of the journal Fine Art, 2000.
	2001	Emma Andijewska im Bild: die Künstlerin und ihre Werke / photographs by Lisa Pfahler-Scharf; foreword by Wolfgang Längsfeld. 64 p.: col. ill.; 24 cm.
	2003	Emma Andijewska. Title of painting on cover: Gekreuzigter Christus (Crucified Christ).
	2013	Emma Andijewska. Katalog einer Ausstellung / Ukrainian Free University; foreword by Natalia Kosmolinska. Munich, 2013. 84 p.
