= Amadoka =

2020 novel by Sofia Andrukhovych

Amadoka (Ukrainian: Амадока) is a novel by Ukrainian writer Sofia Andrukhovych, first published in 2020 by Vydavnytstvo Staroho Leva. The book has three parts, each with their own protagonist. Part 1 is set after the Euromaidan, and follows an amnesiac veteran of the War in Donbas named Bohdan, and his wife Romana. Part 2 is set during The Holocaust, describing the life of Bohdan's grandmother. Part 3, also set after the Euromaidan, follows Sofia Zerova, whose son and husband were killed and executed, respectively. Parts 1 and 2 are narrated by Romana, an archivist who meets Bohdan, and attempts to piece together his identity.

The title "Amadoka" refers to a semi-legendary lake called Amadoka mentioned in Ptolemy's maps.
