= Viddana =

2020 drama film

- Ukrainian: Віддана
- Directed by: Christina Sivolap
- Written by: Alina Semeryakova
- Based on: Felix Austria by Sofia Andrukhovych
- Produced by: Nadiya Zayonchkovska
- Starring: Marianna Januszewicz, Alesya Romanova, Roman Lutsky
- Music by: Yevhen Filatov
- Production company: Film.UA
- Distributed by: Olga Ukraine
- Release date: 16 January 2020
- Country: Ukraine
- Language: Ukrainian

Viddana (Ukrainian: «Віддана», lit. 'Devoted') is a Polish-Ukrainian feature film based on the novel Felix Austria by Ukrainian author Sofia Andrukhovych. Starring Marianna Januszewicz in the lead role as Stefania Czorneńko, the film follows Stefania and her relationship with Adele, with whom she grew up and now works for as a maid.

== Plot summary ==
The film is a historical drama which takes place in the 19th century in the Kingdom of Galicia and Lodomeria, a part of the Austro-Hungarian Empire. It begins in the city of Stanislav in 1868, when a fire destroys the home of Dr. Anger. His wife is killed, but he is able to rescue his daughter Adela and the daughter of a servant, Stephania Czorneńko. Dr. Anger raises them together, and the film jumps forward 25 years.

The remainder of the film follows Stefania and her relationship with Adele, with whom she grew up with and now works for as a maid. The film uses their friendship and understanding as a frame for the inequality which is seen in the background throughout the movie.

== Production ==
The film is the directorial debut for Christina Sivolap and has been cited as one of the first Ukrainian production with European ambitions, with its source being translated into multiple languages and the movie attempting to appeal to an international audience through its cinematography. Singers Tina Karol and Yulia Sanina, of the band The Hardkiss, collaborated on a duet to create a part of the soundtrack of the movie.

Filming lasted 30 days, and was shot in Kyiv, Chernivtsi, Bila Tserkva, and Nizhylovychi. 34 actors and more than 500 extras were involved in the movie. Its cinematography was directed by Oleksiy Lamakh and Oleksandr Batenev, and the script was written by Alina Semeryakova.

The film's composer is musician Yevhen Filatov. The first soundtrack to the film was the song "Boat" by the band Odyn v kanoe, which debuted with the first teaser, in a new arrangement written by Filatov.

On December 12, 2019, the second soundtrack to the film Free was presented, with lyrics by rapper Alyona Alyona and a duet by Tina Karol and Yulia Sanina (lead singer of The Hardkiss).
