= Cecil the Lion Had to Die =

2021 novel by Olena Stiazhkina

Cecil the Lion Had to Die (Ukrainian: Смерть лева Сесіла мала сенс) is a bilingual novel by Ukrainian historian and writer Olena Stiazhkina, first published in both Ukrainian and Russian in 2021 by Staryi Lev Publishing House. It was translated into English by Dominique Hoffmann, and published in 2024 by the Harvard Ukrainian Research Institute. The title is a reference to the killing of Cecil the lion.

In a review in Asymptote, Lillian Posner writes that global attention to the 2015 killing of Cecil the lion eclipsed coverage of Russia's war against Ukraine, a contrast that Stiazhkina reworks as a metaphor in the novel. The book received the 2023 Lviv-UNESCO City of Literature Award.
