= Oksana Zabuzhko =

Ukrainian writer

Oksana Zabuzhko Shevchenko National Prize laureate
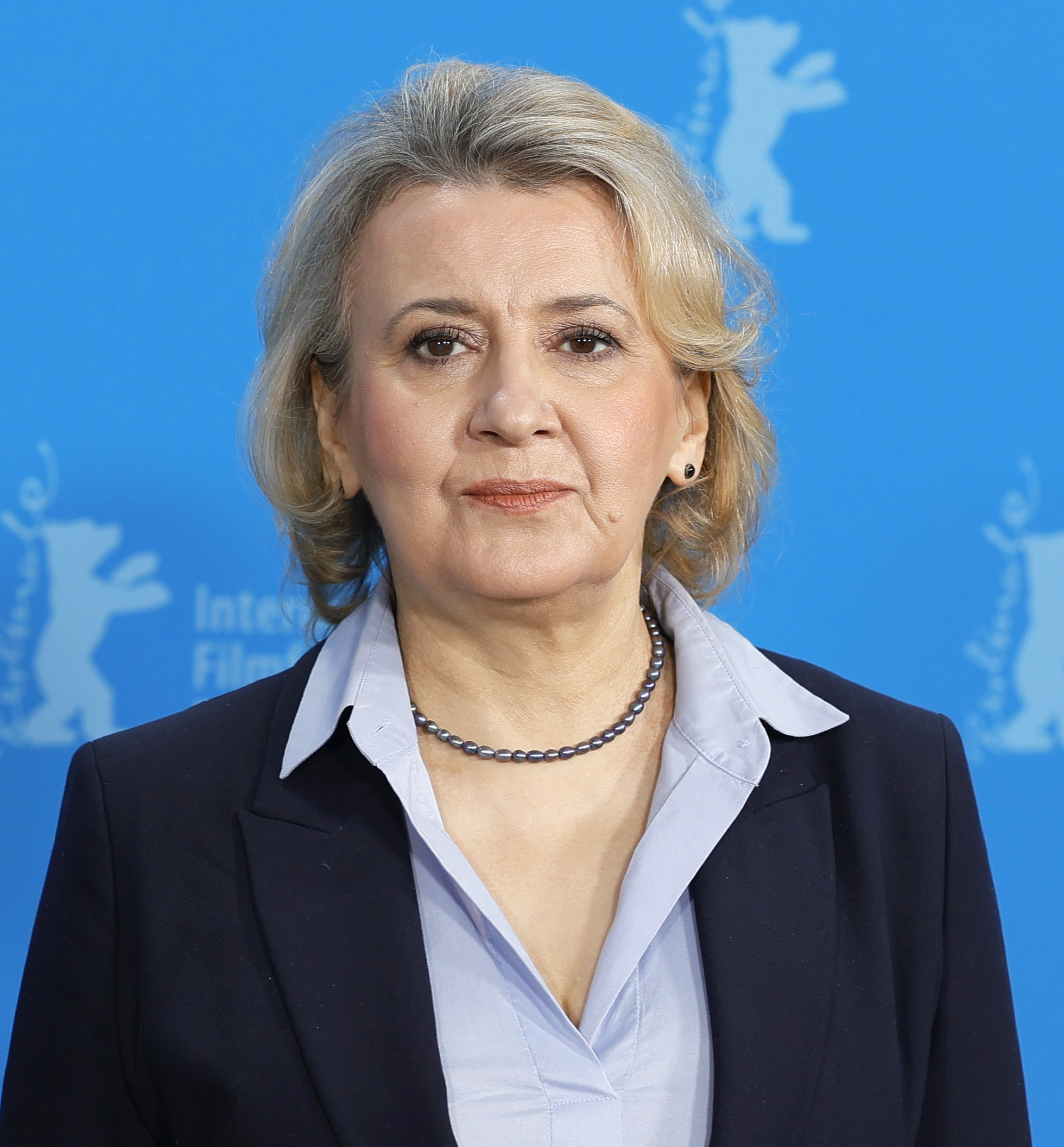
- Oksana Zabuzhko, 2024
- Born: 19 September 1960 (age 65); Lutsk, Ukrainian SSR
- Occupations: novelist, poet, essayist
- Writing career
- Genre: Ukrainian literature
- Notable work: Fieldwork In Ukrainian Sex (1996)
- Website: zabuzhko.com

Oksana Stefanivna Zabuzhko (Ukrainian: Окса́на Стефа́нівна Забу́жко, born 19 September 1960) is a Ukrainian novelist, poet, and essayist. Her works have been translated into several languages.

== Life ==
Zabuzhko was born 19 September 1960 in Lutsk, Ukraine. The writer's father, Stefan (Stepan) Ivanovych Zabuzhko (1926-1983) was a teacher, literary critic, and translator, the first to translate the stories of the Czech composer and writer Ilja Hurník into Ukrainian, and was repressed during Stalin's regime.

According to Zabuzhko, she received her philological education at home. The repressions against the Ukrainian intelligentsia that began in September 1965 forced the family to leave Lutsk, and since 1968 she has lived in Kyiv.

Zabuzhko studied philosophy at the Kyiv University, where she also completed her doctorate in aesthetics in 1987. In 1992, she taught at Penn State University as a visiting writer. Zabuzhko won a Fulbright scholarship in 1994 and taught Ukrainian literature at Harvard and the University of Pittsburgh. To date, Zabuzhko works at the Hryhori Skovoroda Institute of Philosophy of the National Academy of Sciences of Ukraine.

On 8 March 2022 Zabuzhko became the first person who is neither an EU citizen nor an official to address a plenary session of the European Parliament in Strasbourg.

Ukrainians are fighting to free Europe from the spectre of totalitarianism

— Oksana Zabuzhko

== Literary work ==
According to Uilleam Blacker, Oksana Zabuzhko's work has two main preoccupations: national identity and gender. Zabuzhko's first novel, Fieldwork in Ukrainian Sex, published in 1996, was met with great controversy both by the critics and by the readers. With its publication, the Ukrainian readership and the intellectual community faced innovative, provocative and complex feminist writing. According to a poll in 2006, this novel was recognized as "the book that most influenced Ukrainian society during the 15 years of independence". Today it is the most widely translated work of new Ukrainian prose in the world (15 languages), included in many reading lists and ratings of modern Eastern European classics.

Oksana Zabuzhko's most famous book in the non-fiction genre is Notre Dame d'Ukraine: A Ukrainian Woman in the Conflict of Mythologies (2007).

As a trained philosopher and cultural critic, Zabuzhko publishes essays and non-fiction works. Zabuzhko also turns to the Ukrainian history. Her most recent novel, The Museum of Abandoned Secrets (2009), deals with three different epochs (World War II, 1970s, and early 2000s), and, in particular, the topic of Ukrainian Insurgent Army, active in Ukraine in the 1940s and 1950s, and either demonized or silenced by the Soviet historiography.

Oksana Zabuzhko belongs to the generation that Tamara Hundorova, a literary scholar, calls «post-Chornobyl». The Chernobyl catastrophe (1986), according to Hundorova, is not only one of the biggest calamities of the modern times, but also a «symbolic event that projects post-apocalyptical text […] into the post-atomic era». Most importantly, Chernobyl also marks the end of the Soviet Union, at least the end of any legitimacy of its ideology, and the beginning of the new Ukrainian society and new Ukrainian literature, free from socialist realism or consciously dismantling its legacy. One important feature of Oksana Zabuzhko's writing is that it is «turned outward» to the world, to be accessible to the Western reader.

In 1995-2010 she was the vice-president of the Ukrainian branch of the PEN International. In the fall of 2004, she did much to draw international attention to Ukraine's presidential election. On the eve of the Orange Maidan, she published an article in the WSJ by Ukrainian Solidarity.

In June 2018, she supported an open letter from cultural figures, politicians and human rights activists calling on world leaders to speak in defense of Ukrainian director Oleg Sentsov, a prisoner in Russia, and other political prisoners.

== Awards ==
- Antonovych Prize (2009)
- Angelus Award (2013)
- Shevchenko National Prize (2019)
- Women in Arts Award (2020)
- BBC's 100 Women list (2023)

== Major works and style ==
Oksana Zabuzhko's first novel, Fieldwork in Ukrainian Sex, is one of the key texts in post-Soviet Ukrainian literature. It caused great controversy upon its publication, because the narrator expresses dissatisfaction with the established order of relationships between sexes, where a woman is subject to oppression, social and sexual, both by the traditional patriarchy, as a gendered subject, as well as a subject of totalitarianism. The novel was analyzed from the point of view of postcolonial theory. It also inspired a number of comparative studies, where Zabuzhko's novel was compared to the writings of Jamaica Kincaid, Assia Djebar, Angela Carter, Nicole Brossard, and others. The novel was also studied on account of its prominent style, with the «poetic» voice and the «intellectual» voice intermingling and creating an intricate structure. The novel engages some elements of écriture féminine, notably, writing (from) the body.

Oksana Zabuzhko's second novel, Museum of Abandoned Secrets, deals with Ukraine's resistance and opposition to the Soviet colonial regime in the 20th century. The novel presents the reality of the relations between the countries that within the structure of the USSR were seen by the West only in the context of the myth of the «friendships of nations», the myth that Putin's Russia would still like to perpetuate.

Oksana Zabuzhko's most famous non-fiction book is Notre Dame d’Ukraine. It focuses on the Ukrainian writer of the fin-de-siècle era, Lesya Ukrayinka (1871-1913), but is also a study of the Ukrainian intelligentsia of that time and their cultural values. Zabuzhko shows Ukraine's European legacy in regard to the tradition of chivalry and the ways in which it shaped the Ukrainian literature and mentality.

Her book Let My People Go won the Korrespondent magazine Best Ukrainian documentary book award in June 2006, The Museum of Abandoned Secrets — Best Ukrainian Book — 2010.

=== Selected bibliography ===
==== Poetry ====
- May Frost (1985) Травневий іній
- The Conductor of the Last Candle (1990) Диригент останньої свічки
- Hitchhiking (1994) Автостоп
- Second Attempt (2005) Друга спроба

==== Prose ====
- Fieldwork in Ukrainian Sex (1996) Польові дослідження з українського сексу
- Sister, Sister (2003) Сестро, сестро
- The Museum of Abandoned Secrets (2009) Музей покинутих секретів

==== Non-fiction ====
- Philosophy of the Ukrainian Idea and the European Context: Franko Period (1992) Філософія української ідеї та європейський контекст: Франківський період
- Shevchenko's Myth of Ukraine: An Attempt at a Philosophical Analysis (1996) Шевченків міф України: Спроба філософського аналізу
- The Fortinbras Chronicles (1999) Хроніки від Фортінбраса
- Let my People Go: 15 Texts About Ukrainian Revolution (2005) Let my people go. 15 текстів про українську революцію
- Notre Dame d'Ukraine: Ukrayinka in the Conflict of Mythologies (2007) Notre Dame d’Ukraine: Українка в конфлікті міфологій
- From the map of books and people (2012) З мапи книг і людей
- Ukrainian Palimpsest. Conversations of Oksana Zabuzhko and Iza Chruslinska. ""Ukraiński palimpsest". Rozmowy Oksany Zabużko z Izą Chruślińską" 2013.
- And again I get into the tank... Selected texts 2012—2016: articles, essays, interviews, memoirs (2016) І знов я влізаю в танк…. Вибрані тексти 2012—2016: статті, есе, інтерв'ю, спогади
- Wormwood Planet (2020) Планета Полин

=== Zabuzhko's texts translated in English ===
- O. Zabuzhko Girls, Arrowsmith Press, translated by Askold Melnyczuk.
- O. Zabuzhko I, Milena in: The Third Shore: Women's Fiction from East Central Europe (Writings from an Unbound Europe) (Paperback) by Agata Schwartz, Luise von Flotow. Also found in: Two Lands, New Visions: Stories from Canada and Ukraine by Janice Kulyk Keefer (Editor), Solomea Pavlychko (Editor).
- O. Zabuzhko Fieldwork In Ukrainian Sex, translated by Halyna Hryn. Las Vegas: AmazonCrossing, 2011
- A Kingdom of Fallen Statues. Poems and Essays by Oksana Zabuzhko Transl. by Marco Carynnyk, Askold Melnyczuk, Michael M.Naydan, Wanda Phipps, Lisa Sapinkopf, Douglas Burnet Smith, and Virlana Tkacz. Toronto: Wellspring Ltd., 1996
- O. Zabuzhko The Museum of Abandoned Secrets, translated by Nina Shevchuk-Murray. Las Vegas: AmazonCrossing 2012
- "No guilty people in the world? Reading Russian literature after the Bucha massacre" - The Times Literary Supplement, 22 April 2022
- Selected Poems (2022, English translations), Arrowsmith Press

== See also ==
- List of Ukrainian-language writers
- List of Ukrainian women writers
- List of Ukrainian literature translated into English
