= A Novel About Human Destiny =

1982 novel by Emma Andijewska

- Author: Emma Andijewska
- Original title: Роман про людське призначення
- Language: Ukrainian
- Genre: philosophical novel
- Publisher: Suchasnist
- Publication date: 1982
- Publication place: Germany

A Novel About Human Destiny is an epic magic realist novel by the Ukrainian writer Emma Andijewska written by the author from 1970 to 1980 and first published in 1982. The novel tells the stories of the lives of Ukrainians who found themselves in emigration. The work is distinguished by having over 500 characters and by the length of its sentences, which reach several pages.

The style and plot of the novel were remarked and studied by George Shevelov, Danylo Husar Struk and Ivan Fizer. The novel was published twice: in 1982 by the Munich publishing house "Suchasnist" and in 1992 by the Kyiv publishing house "Oriy".

In 1984, Emma Andijewska received the Antonovych prize for this novel. The novel was included in the list of 100 notable Ukrainian literary works compiled by PEN Ukraine.

== Particularities of the novel ==
The novel describes the events that took place in Ukraine and among the Ukrainian diaspora in different countries of the world. Historical figures known among the Ukrainian diaspora are often mentioned in the novel. Among others, these include: Vasyl Barka, Josyf Slipyj, Jacques Hnizdovsky, Gregor Kruk, Bohdan Stashynsky, Yosyp Hirniak, Ivanka Vynnykiv, Maria Dolnytska, Volodymyr Kubijovyč and his wife Daria Siyak, Valentyn Moroz and Catherine Desnitski.

The novel is set in multiple places all over the world: Munich, New York, New Zealand, Pennsylvania, Khust, Prague, Rome, etc. Despite this international setting almost all characters are Ukrainians with few exceptions.

Many characters of the book possess supernatural abilities. Such is Dzindra, an immortal cossack-kharakternyk and the author of the theory of mirrors, thanks to which one can pass through walls. The homeless inventor Ivan Bezruchko also has a special status in the novel. He appears to intervene in the fate of the characters as a higher power. Similar to the characters of Castaneda's novels, Bezruchko also hides his past. Bezruchko never leaves his stork-goose, Juno, who can speak Latin and swallow snakes. Among protagonists of the novel are further mythological characters such as Viktor Platonovych Kentavr (centaur), who is a patriot of Ukraine, a small sphinx and Neptune. There are several alchemists in the novel, one of whom resurrects the character Yevhen Poshelyuzhny. Some heroes can walk through walls, ride lightning, and see the future.

In addition to various transformations and visions, the characters use some magical items, some of which are described in detail:

- Bezruchko's linen tank
- Bezruchko's wheel of fortune
- The beam-mirror made of cast iron similar to an egg used by Dzyndra
- Holy Grail in the Kyiv caves
- A soft diamond
- Coils of time
- Vereta's wardrobe-companion
- Bodan Chaplya's necklace of evil
- Tsyzyo's fire striker

The novel is strongly anti-imperial. The Soviet government and the Russians are often called "unitarians", "happiers of humanity", who are trying to displace Ukrainians "on their own, but not so own land". In the novel, Stalin is called "Yoska", and Lenin "the bearded".

According to the researcher of Andievska's novels, O. Smerek, the novel attempts to create a myth of Ukraine.[3] The words of Taras Shevchenko were chosen as the epigraph to the work "... I will exalt these little dumb slaves!" The center of the earth in the novel is located in Kyiv on Khreshchatyk street. Kyiv is called the eternal city.

Similarly, Ukrainian national symbols (coat of arms and anthem) gain mythological importance. For example, in one of the episodes, Neptune with a trident (which is part of the Coat of arms of Ukraine) exclaims "Ukraine has not yet perished!", which is line from the National anthem of Ukraine.

The novel presents a broad picture of people from all strata of the population and professions among Ukrainian emigrants. This spectrum of characters ranges from farm and construction workers to professors, artists and inventors. Also, the characters belong to different generations of Ukrainians who were already born abroad and preserve or experience changes of their national identity.

== Plot summary ==
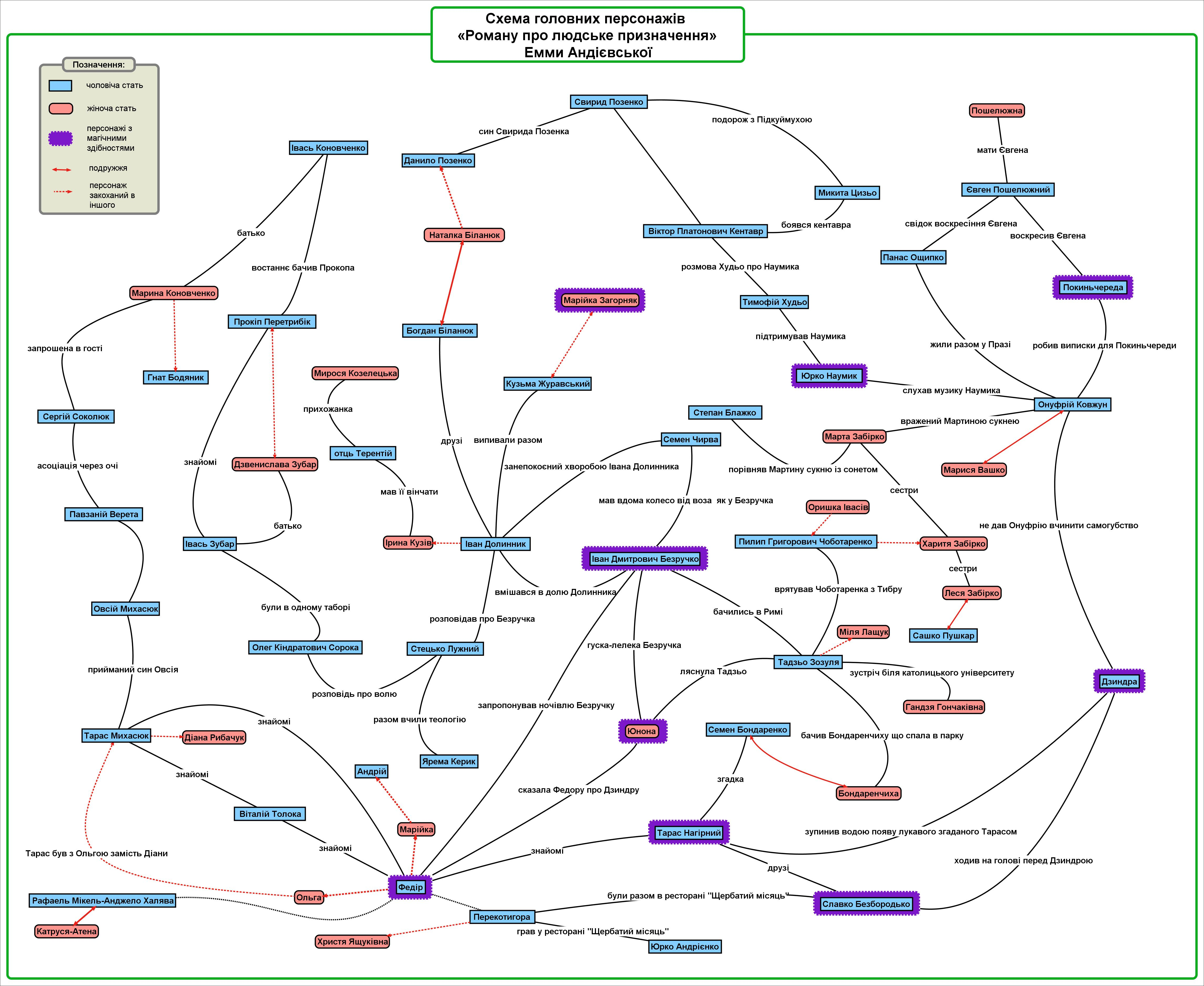
Main characters of the novel and their interrelationships.

The plot of the novel consists of life stories or life episodes of its numerous characters. The stories flow into each other with the mention of the next hero. George Shevelov called this text an anti-novel and a "river novel". Mystical events happen to many characters and the events are described with the author's characteristic surrealistic style.

The novel begins with a conversation between two guardian angels about human destiny. Angels stand in a circle.

Fedir, the architect, meets the homeless inventor Ivan Bezruchko. Bezruchko does not ever part with his mysterious invention, stored in a metal linen tank. Bezruchko's invention is related to Ukraine. He is also always accompanied by the stork-goose Juno, who can speak Latin and swallow snakes. The action of the novel begins in Munich, which is indicated by the mention of such places as Marienplatz, Azam Church and Englischer Garten. Bezruchko is the only character who appears throughout the novel, and Fedir is mentioned again at the end of the novel.

The immortal Dzyndra, author of the theory of mirrors from the 15th century, is another magical character similar to Bezruchko.

Fedir's acquaintance Taras Nagirny is also endowed with supernatural abilities. He is able to pass through walls and has phosphorescent eyes.

Raphael Michel-Angelo Khalyava is an arrogant musical genius whose ancestors tried to fake their origins to make them appear more ancient.

Ivan Dolynnyk, who is very gifted by nature, is introduced next. Ivan is a close friend of Bohdan Bilanyuk.

A significant part of the story is dedicated to Professor Oleh Kindratovych Soroka. Coming from russified Eastern Ukraine, he became interested in his Ukrainian identity.

The novel ends with a conversation between two angels, who are discussing the possibility of the Last Judgment.

== Sources ==
- Danylo Husar Struk. A Novel about Human Destiny, or the Andiievska Chronicle. Journal of Ukrainian Studies 18 # 1-2 (Summer-Winter 1993). P. 151—160.
- Struk, Danylo H. «Andievs'ka's concept of round time.» Canadian Slavonic Papers. 27. 1 (March 1985): 65-73.
- Ніла Зборовська. «Про романи Емми Андієвської». Слово і час. 1994. No. 3. стор. 77–81.
