= Volodymyr Rafeienko =

Ukrainian prose writer, poet, translator and literary and film critic

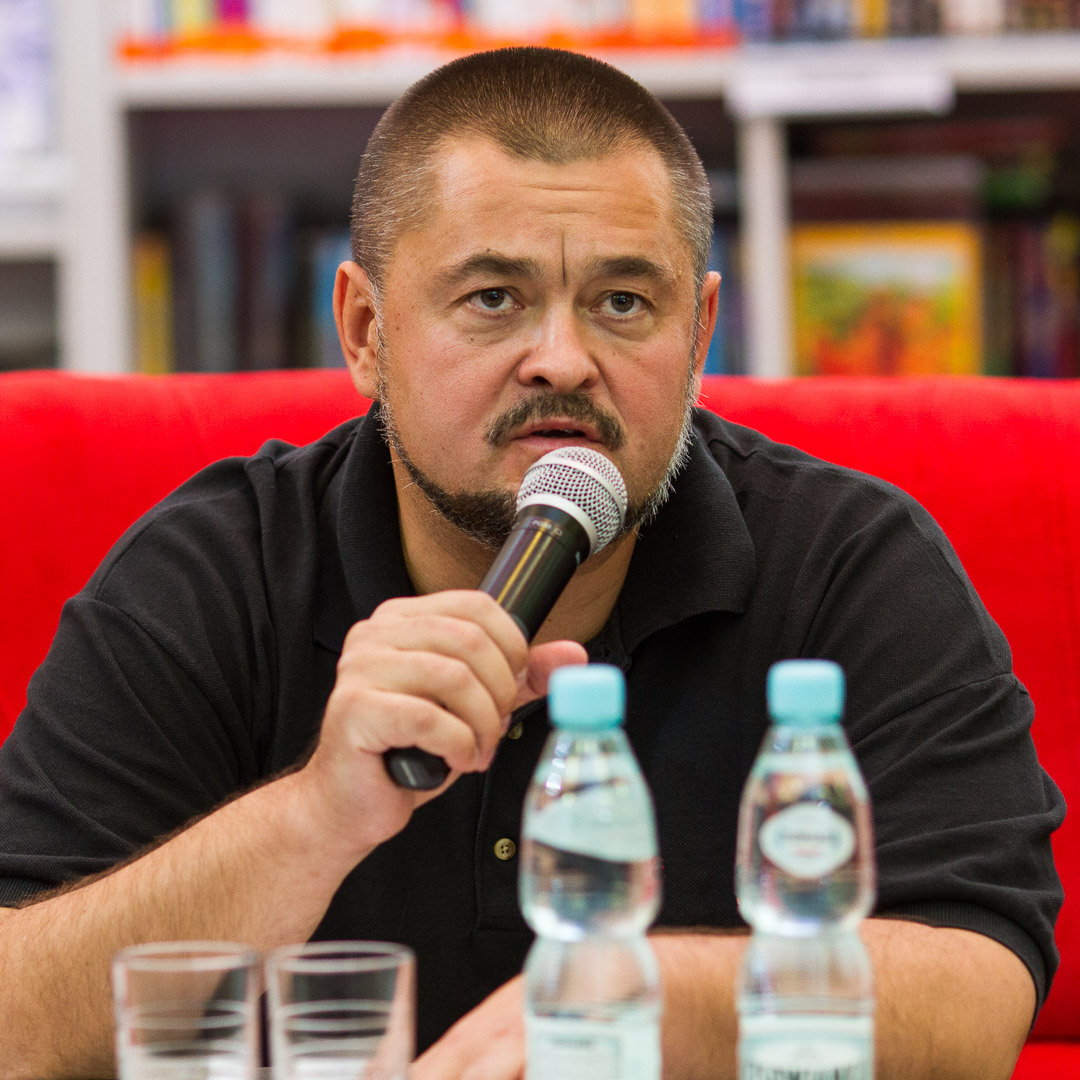
Volodymyr Rafeienko in 2015

Volodymyr Volodymyrovych Rafeyenko (born November 25, 1969) is a Ukrainian prose writer, poet, translator, literary and film critic, a member of PEN Ukraine. From 1992 to 2018, was writing in Russian, published his works mostly in Russia and was regarded as a representative of Russian literature. In 2014, having moved to the Kyiv region, learned Ukrainian, started writing his new novel in Ukrainian, and become a full-fledged representative of Ukrainian literature as well. In 2022, he moved to Ternopil escaping active fighting in Kyiv region. Rafeyenko is a representative of magic realism.

== Biography ==
=== Education ===
Rafeienko was born in Donetsk, Ukraine. He graduated from Donetsk University with a degree in Russian philology and cultural studies.

=== Career ===
Volodymyr Rafeyenko worked as an editor in such Donetsk publishing houses as "BAO" and "Kassiopeia", as a deputy editor in "Mnogotochiye" Magazine. He is an author and compiler of popular science and applicative books, detectives.

=== Bibliography ===
==== Prose books ====
- Brief Farewell Book (rus. "Краткая книга прощаний", 2000, ukr. "Мала книжка прощань", 2017)
- Holidays of Wizards (rus. "Каникулы магов", 2005)
- Irretrievable Verbs (rus. "Невозвратные глаголы", 2009)
- Moscow Divertissement (rus. "Московский дивертисмент", 2011, 2013) — a second-place winner of the 2010 Russian Prize in nomination of "Big Prose"
- All thorough the Summer (rus. "Лето напролёт", 2012)
- Decartes' Demon (rus. "Демон Декарта") — winner of the 2012 Russian Prize in nomination of "Big Prose"
- The Length of Days (rus. "Долгота дней" ukr. "Довгі часи", 2017).
- Mondegreen (Songs about Death and Love). (ukr. "Мондеґрін: пісні про смерть і любов")
- Petrichor: The Scent of the Earth after Rain (ukr. "Петрикор – запах землі після дощу", 2023).

==== Plays ====
- Mobile Waves of Life (ukr. «Мобільні хвилі буття», 2023)

==== Collections of poems ====
- Three Days in the Middle of the Week (rus. "Три дня среди недели", 1998)
- Private Sector (rus. "Частный сектор", 2002)
- Help across the Street (rus. "Переводы через дорогу", 2003).

==== Edited volumes ====
- The War 2022: Diaries, Essays, Poetry. (ukr. "Війна 2022: щоденники, есеї, поезія"

=== Awards ===
- Moscow Divertissement became a second-place winner in a category "Big Prose" of the Russian Literary Prizes "Russian Prize" (2010)
- Decartes' Demon is a winner of 2012 Russian Prize in nomination of "Big Prose" (2013)
- NOS (Nose) Award, short list for the novel Decartes' Demon (2014)
- Visegrad Eastern Partnership Literary Award for the novel The Length of Days (2017).
- Volodymyr Korolenko Award, National Union of Ukrainian Writers, for the novel Brief Farewell Book (2016)
- National Taras Shevchenko Prize of Ukraine, short list for the novel The Length of Days (2018)
- National Taras Shevchenko Prize of Ukraine, short list for the novel Mondegrin. Songs about Death and Life (2020)
- Angelus Central European Literature Award, short list for the novel Mondegrin. Songs about Death and Life (2021)

=== Language use ===
Volodymyr spoke Russian for 45 years of life. He was born in the east of Ukraine, in Donetsk, then, primarily a Russian-speaking city. His parents spoke Russian to him, the first books he read were in Russian; he had always spoken only Russian and studied in Russian. He learned Ukrainian when he moved to Kyiv in 2014. After Full-scale invasion started, he decided that none of his future books would be published in Russian. He reports that returning to his native Russian language is altogether impossible.

== See also ==
- List of Ukrainian-language writers
- List of Ukrainian literature translated into English
