= Yuriy Vynnychuk =

Ukrainian journalist, writer and editor (born 1952)

- Юрій Винничук
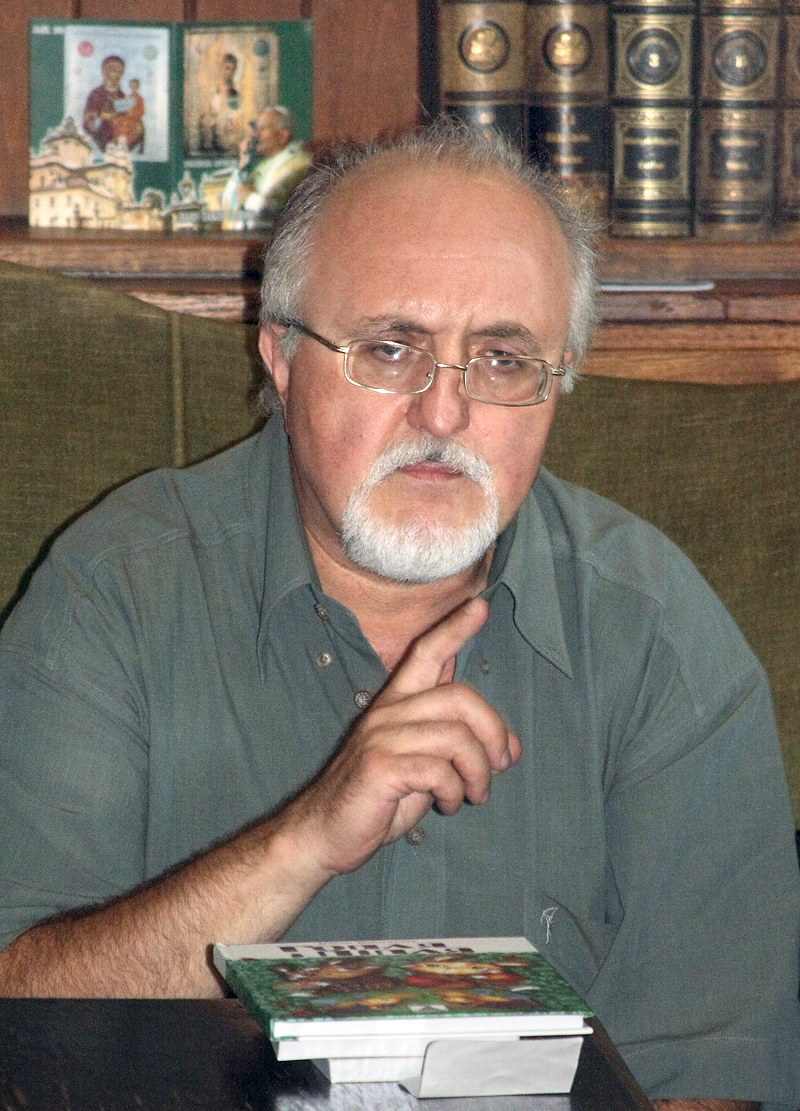
- Born: 18 March 1952 (age 74); Stanislaviv, Ukrainian SSR, Soviet Union (present-day Ivano-Frankivsk, Ukraine)
- Education: Vasyl Stefanyk Precarpathian National University
- Occupations: Journalist; writer; editor
- Writing career
- Language: Ukrainian

Yuriy Pavlovych Vynnychuk (Ukrainian: Юрій Павлович Винничук, pronounced [ˈjur⁽ʲ⁾ij ˈpau̯lowɪtʃ wɪnːɪˈtʃuk]; born 18 March 1952) is a Ukrainian journalist, writer and editor.

== Biography ==
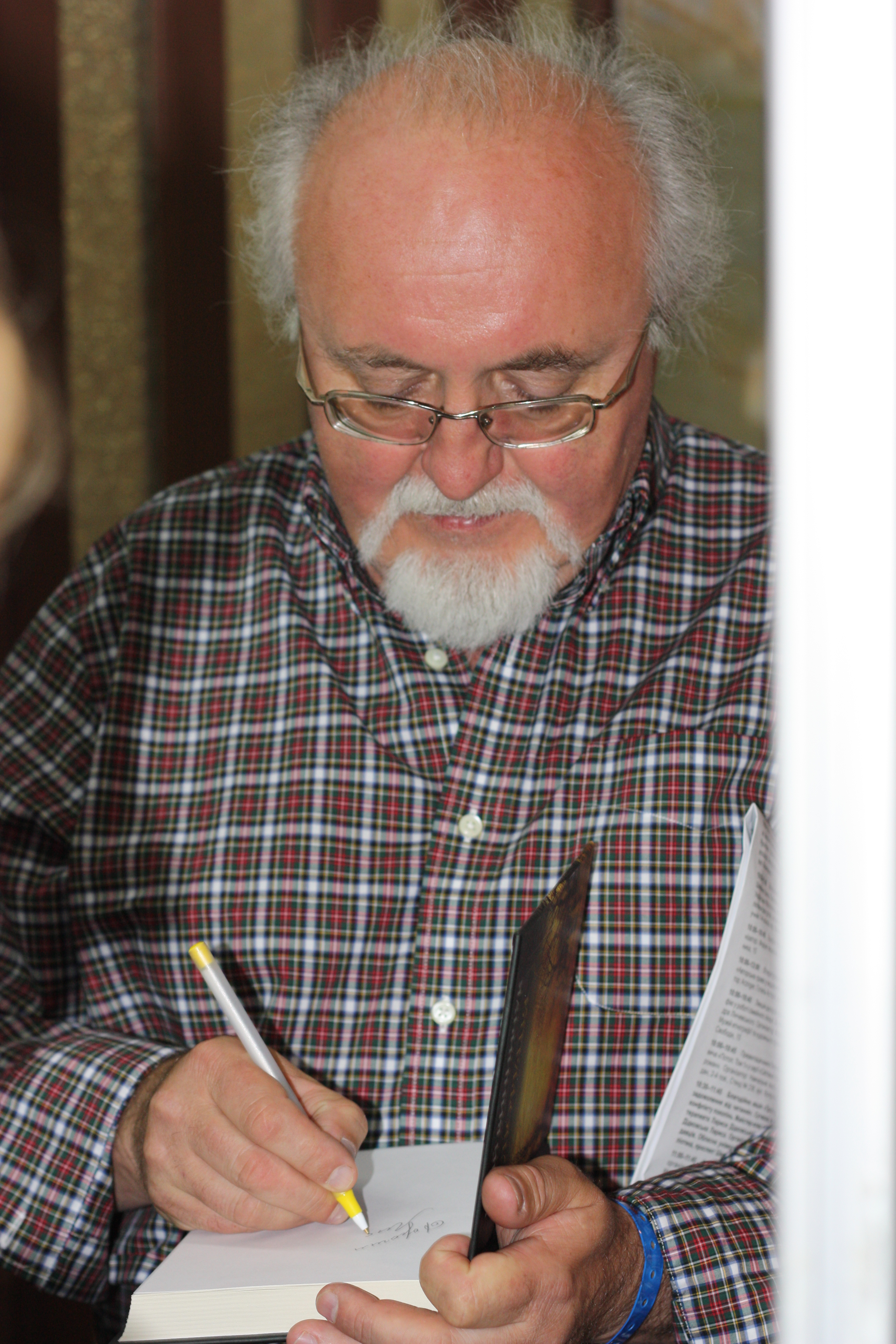
Vynnychuk at the 2017 Publishers' Forum in Lviv

Educated in the Vasyl Stefanyk Subcarpathian National University (formerly Ivano-Frankivsk Pedagogical Institute), Faculty of Philology (1969–1973 years), a teacher of Ukrainian language and literature.

In 1974, he moved to the city and worked as a loader, graphic designers.

1987–1991 — director of Lviv Theatre of Variety, "Do not worry!". He was the author of the script for the play "Do not worry!" and song lyrics. In 1990, he had to leave the theater and together with Stefka Orobets created "Cabarete Yurtsya and Steftsya".

1991–1994 — editor of mysticism and sensational newspaper "Post-Postup".

1995–1998 — chief editor of "Gulvіsa", Lviv.

1998–1999 — editor of the newspaper "Postup".

Since 2006 — chief editor of "Post-Postup" (restored).

Member of the Association of Ukrainian Writers (1997).

== Awards ==
Vynnychuk's novel Tango of Death was awarded the BBC Ukrainian Book of the Year for 2012. The novel is set in Lviv, in the interwar period. The novel is marked with Vynnychuk's trademark fusion of tragedy and humor. The award was Vynnychuk's second BBC Ukrainian Book of the Year. He won the inaugural award in 2005 for his novel Spring Games in Autumn Gardens.

== Political prosecution ==
On 23 January 2012, two police officers came to Vynnychuk's house and asked him to explain in writing about a poem he had recited a few months ago at the "A Night of Erotic Poetry" festival held in Kyiv. A complaint had been lodged with the Prosecutor General by Leonid Hrach, a communist People's Deputy of Ukraine who accused the writer of reciting a pornographic poem and inciting revolt against the Ukrainian government.

== Yuriy Vynnychuk's works translated in English ==
- The Fantastic Worlds of Yuri Vynnychuk (collected short stories). Translated in English by Michael M. Naydan. (Glagoslav Publications, 2016) ISBN 9781911414063
- Tango of Death (novel). Translated from the Ukrainian by Michael M. Naydan and Olha Tytarenko. Translation edited by Ludmilla A. Trigos. (Spuyten Duyvil, 2019) ISBN 978-1-949966-33-6

== See also ==
- List of Ukrainian-language writers
- List of Ukrainian literature translated into English
- Ukrainian literature
