= Maria Matios =

Ukrainian poet, novelist and official (born 1959)

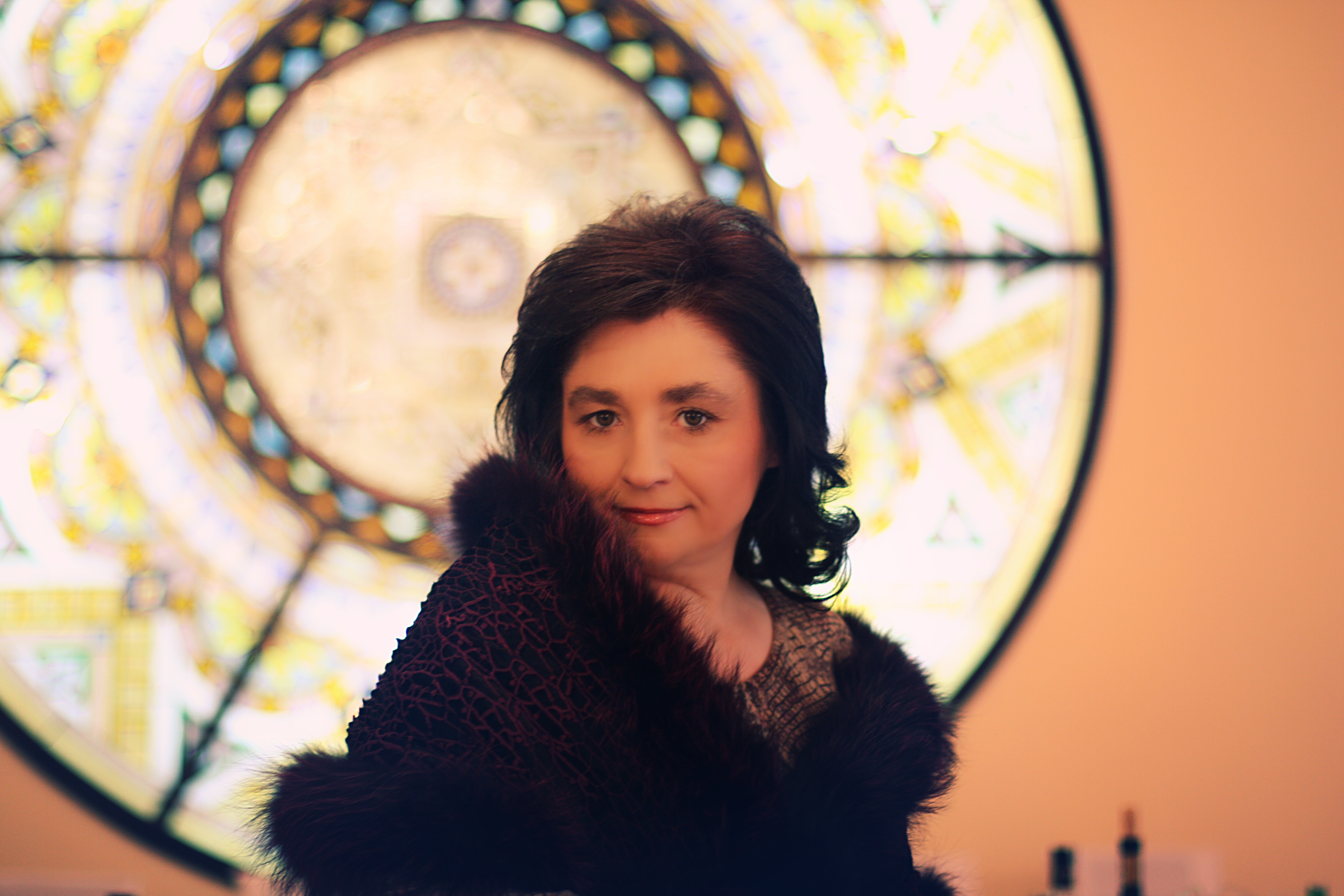
Matios in 2010

Maria Vasylivna Matios (Ukrainian: Марія Василівна Матіос; born 19 December 1959) is a Ukrainian poet, novelist and official. She won the "Book of the Year 2004" prize and the Taras Shevchenko National Prize.

== Biography ==
Matios was born in the village of Roztoky in the Bukovina region, and presently resides in Kyiv. She has authored 12 volumes of fiction and poetry, including the novel Sweet Darusya: A Tale of Two Villages (2003), and the collections of stories titled The Short Life (2001) and Nation (2002).

She has also published Banquet at Maria Matios', the first cookery book written by a contemporary Ukrainian writer, as well as the controversial Boulevard Novel. Her interests include psychology, ethnography, gardening and flower-growing.

Her prose works have been translated into Russian, Polish, English, Serbian, Belarusian (...Hardly Ever Otherwise).

Her first poems were published when she was fifteen years old. In 1992 she published her first prose writing in Kyiv Magazine. Maria Matios bases her books on the unique experiences of her family, whose roots in the Carpathian Mountains and the Hutsul community go back as far as 1790. She was the winner of the "Book of the Year 2004" prize and of the Taras Shevchenko National Award in 2005 (for her novel Sweet Darusya: A Tale of Two Villages).

Matios was elected to parliament, after being placed at number 2 on the electoral list of UDAR during the 2012 Ukrainian parliamentary election. In the 2014 Ukrainian parliamentary election Matios was re-elected to parliament after being number 7 in the top 10 of the electoral list of Petro Poroshenko Bloc. Matios did not take part in the 2019 Ukrainian parliamentary election.

== See also ==
- List of Ukrainian-language poets
- List of Ukrainian women writers
- List of Ukrainian literature translated into English
