= Andriy Bondar =

Ukrainian poet and translator (born 1974)

- Андрій Бондар
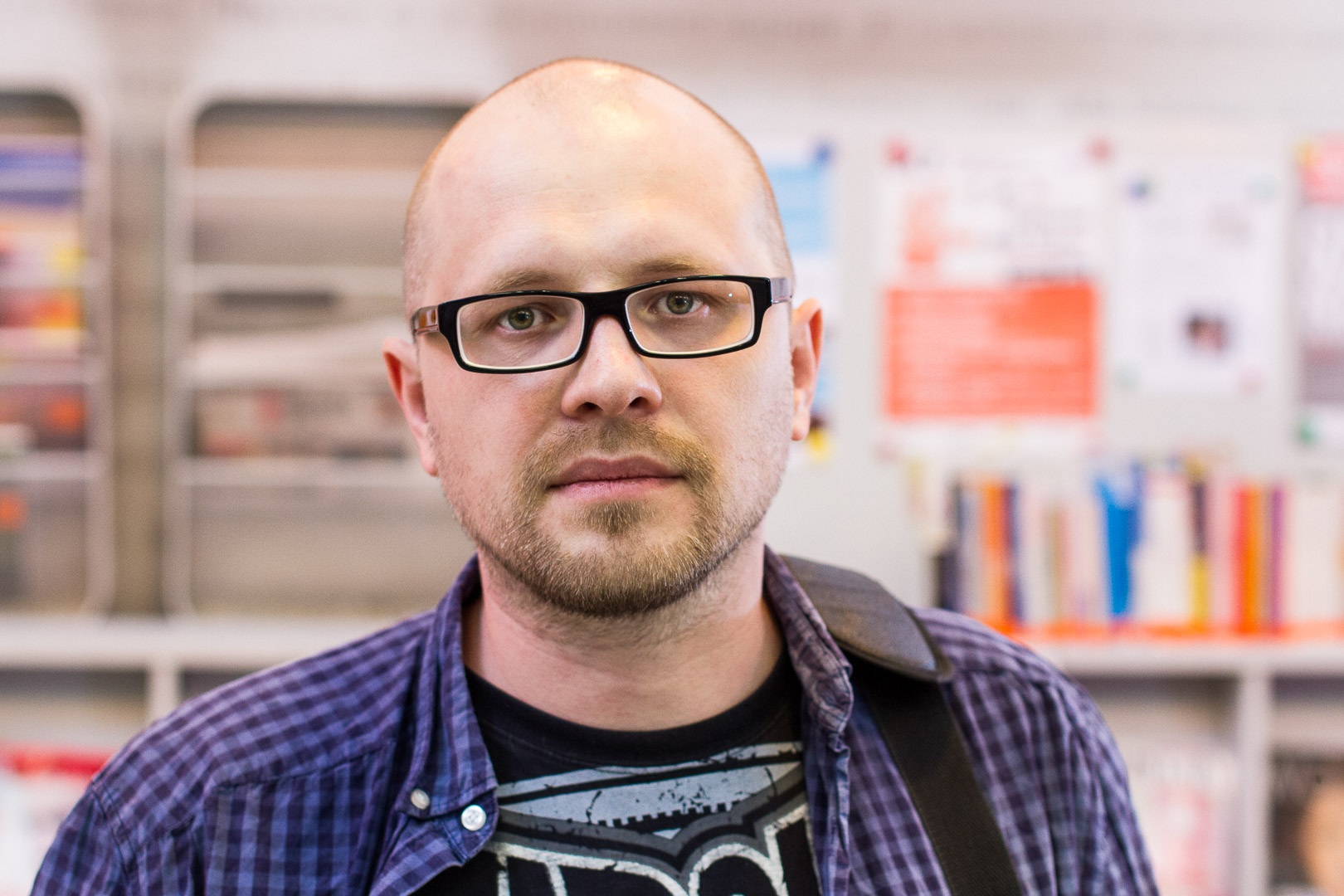
- Bondar in 2015
- Born: 14 August 1974 (age 52); Kamianets-Podilskyi, Khmelnytskyi Oblast, Ukrainian SSR, Soviet Union
- Education: Kamyanets-Podilsky Ivan Ohienko National University; National University of Kyiv-Mohyla Academy)
- Occupations: Poet; opinion writer; translator
- Spouse: Sofia Andrukhovych
- Awards: see here

Andriy Volodymyrovych Bondar (Ukrainian: Андрій Володимирович Бондар; born 14 August 1974) is a Ukrainian poet, interpreter, opinion writer and a member of the National Writers' Union of Ukraine in 1998. He is the husband of Ukrainian writer Sofia Andrukhovych.

== Early life and education ==
Born on 14 August 1974, in the Ukrainian city of Kamianets-Podilskyi. In 1991, Bondar received his diploma from Kamianets-Podilskyi High School No.9. He attended the Kamianets-Podilskyi Pedagogical Institute's (now Kamyanets-Podilsky Ivan Ohienko National University) Faculty of Philology from 1991 to 1994. He enrolled at the National University of Kyiv-Mohyla Academy to study history and literary theory in 1994 and graduated in 2001. After moving to Kyiv, he loses a large notebook that included all the poetry he had written over the previous three years within a few months of moving.

== Career ==
Editor-in-chief of the National Writers' Union of Ukraine publication Література плюс from 1998 to 2000; from 2001 to 2002, deputy editor-in-chief of the magazine Єва; editor of the Книжкова лавка literary page of the Дзеркало тижня newspaper (2001–2007), and later the columnist at Газети по-українськи in 2006.

Bondar's first book of poetry, Весіння єресь (Spring Heresy), was released in 1998. It was followed by Істина і мед (Truth and Honey), Примітивні форми власностіvlasnosti (Primitive Forms of Ownership) in 2004. Additionally, he is the author of the short story collections І тим, що в гробах (And for Those in the Graves) in 2016, and Морквяний лід (Carrot Ice) in 2012. He has written a great deal of essays, tales, and articles for different journals.

English, German, French, Polish, Swedish, Portuguese, Romanian, Croatian, Lithuanian, Belarusian, and Czech are among the languages into which his poetry and prose have been translated. He has translated more than forty volumes of Polish and English literary works, including poetry, fiction, nonfiction, and scholarly studies. He edited the bilingual Facebook community Eurolution.Doc (Ukraine on Maidan) from January to April of 2014.

Bondar has translated many books from English into Ukrainian, including Walking the Amazon (2012) by Ed Stafford and Short Walks from Bogota: Journeys in the New Colombia (2013) by Tom Freiling. The Science of Love and Betrayal by Robin Dunbar (2013), Nikolai Gogol and Edyta Bojanowska for the book Between Russian and Ukrainian Nationalism (2013), Michael Spence's The Next Convergence; Peter Pomerantsev's Nothing Is True And Everything Is Possible (2015); Robert D. Kaplan's Eastward to Tartary; Anthony Pagden's Worlds at War; and Michael Spence's The Future of Economic Growth in a Multispeed World.

== Works ==
Bondar has written and published the following poetry and translations:

=== Literature and poetry ===
- Весіння єресь (1998)
- Істина і мед (2001)
- MASKUL'T (2003)
- Примітивні форми власності (2004)
- 100 тисяч слів про любов, включаючи вигуки (2008)
- Метаморфози : 10 українських поетів останніх 10 років (2011)
- Морквяний лід (2012)
- 13 різдвяних історій (2014)
- І тим, що в гробах (2016)

=== Translations ===
- Ferdydurke by Witold Gombrowicz (2002)
- Weather for All by Marek Lavrynovych (2005)
- Lustyvnia by Michal Vitkovsky (2006)
- Funeral by Sacre by Pavel Smolensky (2006)
- Farewell to the Empire by Olya Hnatiuk (2006)
- The Poet Talks to the People by Bohdan Zadura (2007)
- Never in life! by Katarzyna Grochola (2008)
- Spot on the Ceiling by Piotr Zaremba (2008)
- Heart on the sling by Katarzyna Grochola (2009)
- You ate like a stone by Wojciech Tochman (2009)
- I'll show you! by Katarzyna Grochola (2010)

== Political positions ==
=== Renaming of Moskovsky Avenue ===
In honor of Stepan Bandera, Moskovsky Avenue in Kyiv was renamed. On 7 July 2016, 87 out of the 97 representatives of the Kyiv City Council voted in favor of this resolution. This is a foolish error, according to Bondar. He pointed out that Bandera stirs up a variety of emotions in their society and is a certain way to go afoul of Poles who are going through yet another round of image irritation in light of the Massacres of Poles in Volhynia and Eastern Galicia's anniversary.

=== Oleg Sentsov and Ukrainian political prisoners ===
Bondar backed an open letter sent in June 2018 to international leaders by lawmakers, human rights advocates, and prominent personalities in the arts urging them to stand up for Ukrainian filmmaker Oleh Sentsov and other political prisoners detained in Russia.

== Personal life ==
Bondar currently lives in Kyiv. Writer Sofia Andrukhovych is his spouse, and together they have a daughter, Varvara (born 10 March 2008).

== Awards and recognitions ==
Bondar has received awards and recognitions such as:

- BBC Book of the Year in the Essays category (2018)
- Member of the National Writers' Union of Ukraine (1998)
- Smoloskyp Publishing House Award (1997)
