= Tango of Death (novel) =

2012 historical novel by Yuriy Vynnychuk

- Author: Yuriy Vynnychuk
- Original title: Танґо смерті
- Translator: Michael M. Naydan; Olha Tytarenko
- Language: Ukrainian
- Genre: Historical novel
- Set in: Lviv (interwar and Second World War; contemporary frame narrative)
- Publisher: Folio, Spuyten Duyvil (English translation)
- Publication date: 2012
- Publication place: Ukraine
- English publication date: 2019
- Media type: Print
- Pages: 469 (English edition)
- Awards: BBC Ukrainian Book of the Year (2012)
- ISBN: 978-1-949966-33-6
- OCLC: 1104856874

Tango of Death is a Ukrainian historical novel by Yuriy Vynnychuk. It was first published in 2012 by Folio and received the BBC Ukrainian Book of the Year award for 2012.
