= Olena Stiazhkina =

Ukrainian historian and writer

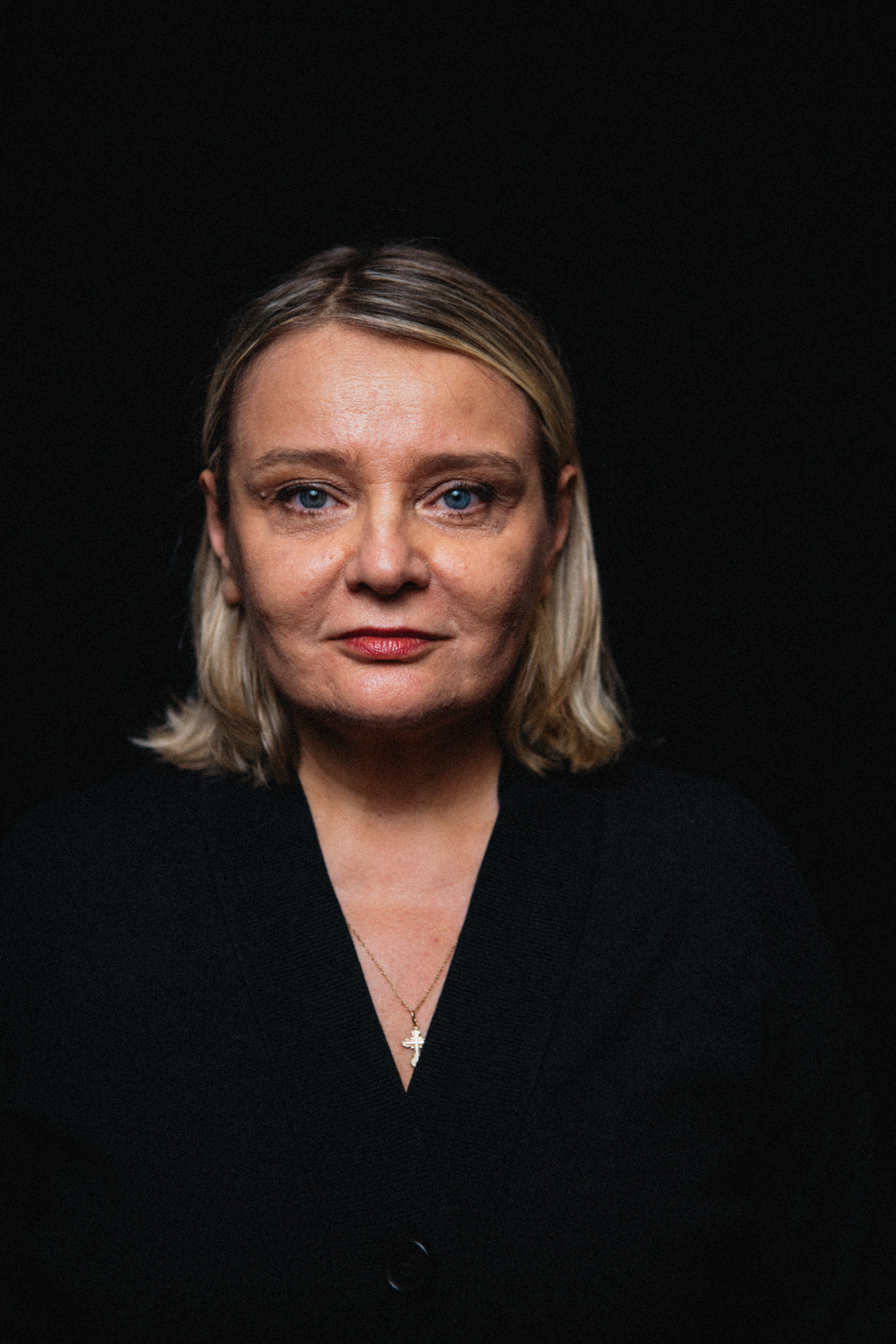
Stiazhkina in 2021

Olena Viktorivna Stiazhkina is a Ukrainian historian, academic and writer. She is a research fellow in history at the National Academy of Sciences of Ukraine. She is the author of "Cecil the Lion Had to Die", the war diary "Ukraine, War, Love: A Donetsk Diary", and the essay collection "Zero Point Ukraine: Four Essays on World War II". Her book "Cecil the Lion Had to Die" won the Lviv–UNESCO City of Literature Award in 2023.

== Early life and education ==
Stiazhkina was born in 1958 in Donetsk and has a Ph.D. in history.

== Academic career ==
From 1993 to 2014, she taught Slavic History at Donetsk National University.

After the Russian occupation of Donetsk in 2014, Stiazhkina left the city and taught at Mariupol State University from 2015 to 2016. A native Russian speaker, from 2014, Stiazhkina also began writing solely in Ukrainian.

Since 2016, Stiazhkina has worked as a research fellow in history at the National Academy of Sciences of Ukraine. She was also a virtual writer in residence at the faculty of medieval and modern languages at the University of Oxford's New College in 2023.

Stiazhkina has also published collections of novels and short stories in Ukrainian and Russian. Her second novel was the book "Cecil the Lion Had to Die", which was released in 2021. In 2023, she was a member of the jury for the Encounter: The Ukrainian-Jewish Literary Prize. In 2024, she released the war diary "Ukraine, War, Love: A Donetsk Diary".

== Critical reception ==
Of her book, "Cecil the Lion Had to Die", Asymptote said "Through this series of non-sequential pictures, Stiazhkina interweaves the stories of twelve characters over the course of thirty-four years. Each of them must grapple in their own way with the question of how to live in a globalized world."

In 2024, Publishers Weekly explained of Stiazhkina and the book: "Stiazhkina, a Russian native speaker, transitioned to writing in Ukrainian, and her linguistic shift is visually represented in the novel's design, with Russian text appearing as white on black pages and Ukrainian as black on white—a creative decision that mirrors Ukraine's cultural transformation."

Of her war diary, "Ukraine, War, Love: A Donetsk Diary", the New Eastern Europe said it was "Deeply personal and at times unnerving... depict[ing] an eastern Ukraine ravaged by Russian propaganda" that "Stiazhkina manages... to give voice to the human toll of the war in her entries. She focuses not necessarily on body counts,... Instead, she centres the focus on the individual, emotional toll individuals pay during wartime."

Publishers Weekly said the book "provides a harrowing account of Russia's 2014 takeover of the Ukrainian city of Donetsk... Filled with gut-wrenching anecdotes and rousing prose."

== Awards and honours ==
Stiazhkina was awarded the Lviv–UNESCO City of Literature Award (2023) for her novel "Cecil the Lion Had to Die".

== Selected works ==
- Olena Stiazhkina (author), Anne O. Fisher (translator). "Ukraine, War, Love: A Donetsk Diary". 2024. ISBN 978-0674291706.
- Olena Stiazhkina (author), Dominique Hoffmann (translator). Cecil the Lion Had to Die (2024) Harvard University Press. (English).
- Olena Stiazhkina. Cecil the Lion Had to Die (2021) (Ukrainian)
- Olena Stiazhkina. Zero Point Ukraine: Four Essays on World War II (2021) Ibidem Press. ISBN 978-3838215501.
- Olena Stiazhkina. Rozka. (2018)
- Olena Stiazhkina. In God's Language. (2016)
