= The Museum of Abandoned Secrets =

2009 novel by Oksana Zabuzhko

- Author: Oksana Zabuzhko
- Original title: Музей покинутих секретів
- Language: Ukrainian
- Publication date: 2009
- Publication place: Ukraine

The Museum of Abandoned Secrets (Ukrainian: Музей покинутих секретів) is a 2009 novel written by Oksana Zabuzhko. The novel, more than 800 pages long, spans six decades of contemporary Ukrainian history.

Critics have compared the book to Thomas Mann's Buddenbrooks. The novel, Zabuzhko's third, is a modern multigenerational saga which covers the years 1940 to 2004, framed as investigations by a journalist, Daryna Hoshchynska, of historical events in western Ukraine including the Holodomor, the Ukrainian Insurgent Army, and later political changes, ending just before the Orange Revolution.

The book won the 2010 award for best Ukrainian book, presented by Korrespondent magazine, and the 2013 Angelus Central European Literature Award, presented by the City of Wrocław. Angelus jury president, Natalya Gorbanevskaya, described the book as a "book that weaves into one history and modernity, the book that features magic, love, betrayal, and death."

== Content ==
The novel describes Ukrainian contemporary history over several decades as the story of several generations from the perspective of women, stretching up to 2003. The focus is on the journalist and television presenter Daryna Hoshchynska, who investigates the fate of a Ukrainian partisan who is betrayed to the Soviet authorities by her lover. During her research, Hoshchynska falls in love with her great-nephew. In the course of the research, the reader learns about the Holodomor, the famine in the Soviet Union in the 1930s in the Ukrainian Soviet Socialist Republic, the history and end of the UPA combined with struggles against Soviet rule and against Poland from 1943 to 1947. The story continues to the present day with the start of the Ukrainian national movement and the declaration of independence in late and post-communist Ukraine. Another storyline is the death of her best friend, a painter who was married to a member of parliament.

== See also ==
- List of Ukrainian-language writers
- Ukrainian literature
