= Sweet Darusya: A Tale of Two Villages =

2003 novel by Maria Matios

Sweet Darusya: A Tale of Two Villages is a 2003 novel by Ukrainian writer Maria Matios. First published in Ukraine, it was translated into English by Michael M. Naydan and Olha Tytarenko, and published in 2019. In 2005, Matios received the Shevchenko National Prize for the book.

== Reception ==
Writing in The Guardian, Jonathan Myerson wrote that the book offers a "heartbreaking insight into what, historically, it has meant to be Ukrainian and what it is that they’re now fighting for". World Literature Today called the book "a true family saga without a clearly outlined plot, showcasing a few storylines that overlap and tell a story through their own characters and events". The book has also been an object of academic study for some time.
