= A Novel about a Good Person =

1973 novel by Emma Andijewska

- Author: Emma Andijewska
- Original title: Роман про добру людину
- Translator: Olha Rudakevych
- Language: Ukrainian
- Genre: philosophical novel
- Publisher: University of Alberta Press
- Publication date: 1973
- Publication place: Germany
- English publication date: 2017

A Novel about a Good Person is an epic philosophical novel by the Ukrainian writer Emma Andijewska. The novel is set in the displaced persons camp for Ukrainians in Mittenwald (Germany) after World War II. The novel has a moral, philosophical and anti-imperial character. The particularity of the text are long sentences which sometimes reach several pages. The novel is written as a continuous text without division into chapters or sections. There are numerous episodic characters in the novel. The author worked on the novel in 1964–1968. The text was published twice: in 1973 by the Suchasnist publishing house in Munich and in 1993 by the Oriy publishing house in Kyiv. In 2017, the novel was translated into English by Olha Rudkevych and published with the foreword by Marko Robert Stech.

== Moral message of the novel ==
The main theme of the novel is goodness. This is included in the title of the work. According to the philosophy of the novel, one can be a good person even with ordinary human flaws. Father Gudziy and Stetsko Stupalka, who like to drink alcohol, are presented as such imperfect, but good characters in the novel. Also, the thief Dmytryk is portrayed as a person who is noble in the depth of his soul and who is gradually undergoing transformation into a good person. The author often sneers at highly educated characters who lack basic humanity. Another character, Hrytsykha, near whose house a magical sunflower grows, uses her magical abilities for good. Furthermore, Gudziy's wife is also distinguished by her boundless kindness.

Imperial influence on Ukraine is presented as a clear evil in the novel. On many occasions the author sharply condemns the oppression of the Ukrainian language and culture, the assimilation of Ukrainians, the rejection of the national identity of Ukrainians by the international community. This condemnation is based on the examples of characters in the novel who experience abuse from NKVD. The empire is identified with evil in grotesque images, such as Satan with the faces of Stalin.

== Plot summary ==
The novel begins with a philosophical paragraph about the rarity of infinite kindness in people and the fact that the whole world is maintained thanks to good people.

The setting of the novel is the Ukrainian camp for displaced persons in Mittenwald (Germany). The main character of the work, Dmytryk, is a camp thief who is able to skillfully sell the stolen goods. Dmytryk is the leader of a whole group which conducts its activities under his leadership. While telling anecdotes to Tymko, Dmyryk does not notice how his suitcase rolls down into the camp. He receives his suitcase from the camp's kind sorceress, Hrytsykha. A sunflower grows near her house, next to which there is the entrance to hell. Two children calmly pass through hell and return. After them, Stetsko Stupalka, a camp drunkard, also goes to hell. He ends up on Khreshchatyk, where monuments to Ukrainian national heroes Taras Shevchenko, Lesya Ukrainka and others are poured with dirt. Youngsters force Stetsko to do the same, but he hesitates and thereby saves himself from hell by doing a conscientious deed.

Fleeing from hell, Stetsko comes across Professor Kava and has a long philosophical conversation with him about goodness. The professor convinces Stetsko that he is good and that he should save one good person in the camp from death at night. He is magically transported to Samarkand. Upon his return, Stetsko tells Hevryk about his adventures. At this time, Dmytryk's next operation to steal a cow and sell its meat is unfolding near them. Everything went well, but after this operation, a cow appears to Dmytryk in a vision and his conscience awakens. People start turning to him for help. Pyatachykha asks him to break into the apartment, where she thinks to find her son with a girl. By breaking down the door, Dmytryk instead prevents the suicide of Petro Kopylenko, the inventor of biophotons, catalysts of good and destroyers of evil. Next Vasyl Tereshchenko asks Dmytryk to help hime, and Dmytryk testifies in Vasyl's favor. For his rescue, Tereshchenko thanks Dmytryk by giving him lessons in various sciences. Next, Dmytryk agrees to hide the murderer Yosyp among his boys at the request of his wife Teklya. Yosyp causes trouble in Dmytryk's group by temporarily becoming a member of it.

The novel ends with Dmytryk saying goodbye to the camp. He decides to start a completely new life. At the last dinner with the camp residents, he delivers a speech about a good person identical to the first paragraph of the novel. Having taken none of his possessions with him, Dmytryk leaves the camp with the desire to become a good person.

== Sources ==
- Смерек О. С. Романи Емми Андієвської: художньо-філософські шукання, міфологізм, поетика творчості. — Львів: НАН України; Львівське відділення Інституту літератури ім. Т. Г. Шевченка., 2007. — 191c. : іл. ISBN 966-02-4196-8.
- Struk, Danylo H. «Andievs'ka's concept of round time.» Canadian Slavonic Papers. 27. 1 (March 1985): 65-73.
- Зборовська, Ніла. «Про романи Емми Андієвської». Слово і час. 1994. No. 3. стор. 77–81.
