= Fieldwork in Ukrainian Sex =

Ukrainian book

Fieldwork in Ukrainian Sex is a 1996 novel by Oksana Zabuzhko. It caused significant controversy among critics and readers. This innovative and complex feminist writing was a new experience for the Ukrainian readership and intellectual community. In a 2006 poll, the novel was recognized as having the greatest impact on Ukrainian society during the 15 years of independence. The translation to English was made by Halyna Hryn and was published in 2011. It is now the most translated piece of new Ukrainian prose around the world, with translations available in 15 languages. It is often included in reading lists and considered a modern classic of Eastern European literature.

== Plot ==
In the center of the plot is the Ukrainian poet Oksana and her lover, a Ukrainian artist and sculptor, referred to as "Mykola K." Oksana tells the story of her relationship with Mykola, interspersed with episodes from the life of her family and friends. From time to time she digresses with some topics of the new Ukrainian history, the essence of love and passion, the identity of Ukrainians and, in particular, Ukrainian women.

Oksana met Mykola in Lutsk at a festival. He offered Oksana to show the local architecture, but she initially rejected the offer seeing him as a "cheap dude". However, despite a bad feeling, she left with Mykola. Both of them spent the night in the artist's studio. This was the beginning of the story of their relationship, which lasted the whole fall. The new relationship often made Oksana suffer because of the carelessness of her lover, his harsh words and avoidance. However, he was her first love, who spoke excellent Ukrainian and with whom she had common interests.

After three months Oksana received an invitation to teach in Cambridge, USA. Shortly after she told Mykola about the news, a fire started in the house where she was spending time with her friends. Oksana suspected that Mykola set it up and offered to go to the United States with her, but he refused.

While abroad, Oksana felt lonely, bothered by the feeling that Mykola would die in a car accident (which had almost happened several times already). She started going to the pool and the library to avoid negative thoughts, but it did not help. At the end of the winter, Oksana heard from her friend that their mutual friend had died in an accident. It made her delve into thoughts about getting older, she began to notice signs of aging in herself although she was only 34. After long contemplations about the tragedy, Oksana managed to contact Mykola on the phone. It turned out that he got into an accident and broke his ribs. Oksana's friend, Mark, offered to help to move Mykola to the US and find him a workshop.

Although Oksana and Mykola eventually met after all the unfortunate accidents, their life together in the United States was not very long. The couple constantly argued, and finally Mykola who ended up with no money, left Oksana.

In the end, she admits that her love for Mykola was still worth suffering since only free people can love, and love gets rid of fear. Her American friend Donna commented on her story saying that "Eastern European men are really rude, but at least they have passion, but what do ours have? ..."

== Writing style ==
Zabuzhko commented on the novel being autobiographical as a principled author's position: "Why did I give my character my own name and biography? This means that, as an author, I am responsible for the authenticity of the experience that is expressed in the work. I tell the reader to interpret this seriously. After all, I am also a product of Ukrainian literature with all its upbringing, so I tried to break through in myself, to remove certain taboos on saying certain things that were never talked about". The writing style of Zabuzhko in the novel is mostly a long monologue of the narrator which contains both colloquial, sometimes even vulgar language, and poetic language (the work contains fragments of poems by Zabuzhko and many other Ukrainian authors). The narrator's long monologue is sometimes interrupted by talking to a fictitious audience such as "Ladies and gentlemen." In general, the language of the main character is characterized by long, complex sentences, with many complications and punctuation marks. Some sentences can spread over a whole page or even more. The monologues in the novel are built in such a way that the narrator appears in them in the first, second and third persons.

== Themes ==
The author is interested in two themes - the identity of a woman and national identity. The novel focuses on Ukrainian national self-consciousness and the author's thoughts about the lack of reading of Ukrainian literature, about the lack of realization in the for he Ukrainian people. Oksana, in the voice of her hero, admits that if she had written, for example, in Russian or English, her books would not have been lying around for years on the shelves of Kyiv bookstores. A person in a post-colonial society experiences fear and "exposing the body" is a liberation from fear. Oksana Zabuzhko presents a new concept of sexuality and personality of a woman, which was formed on feminist views. In her work, the writer created a new type of woman character who is an intellectual and faces different gender issues. The character is an intellectual, an independent, self-sufficient woman, who is capable to speak.

== Reviews ==
- Berbenuik, Brianna (2015). We are all from the camps: A review of Oksana Zabuzhko's fieldwork in Ukrainian sex --- Brianna Berbenuik.
- Numéro Cinq.
