= Sofia Andrukhovych =

Ukrainian writer and translator

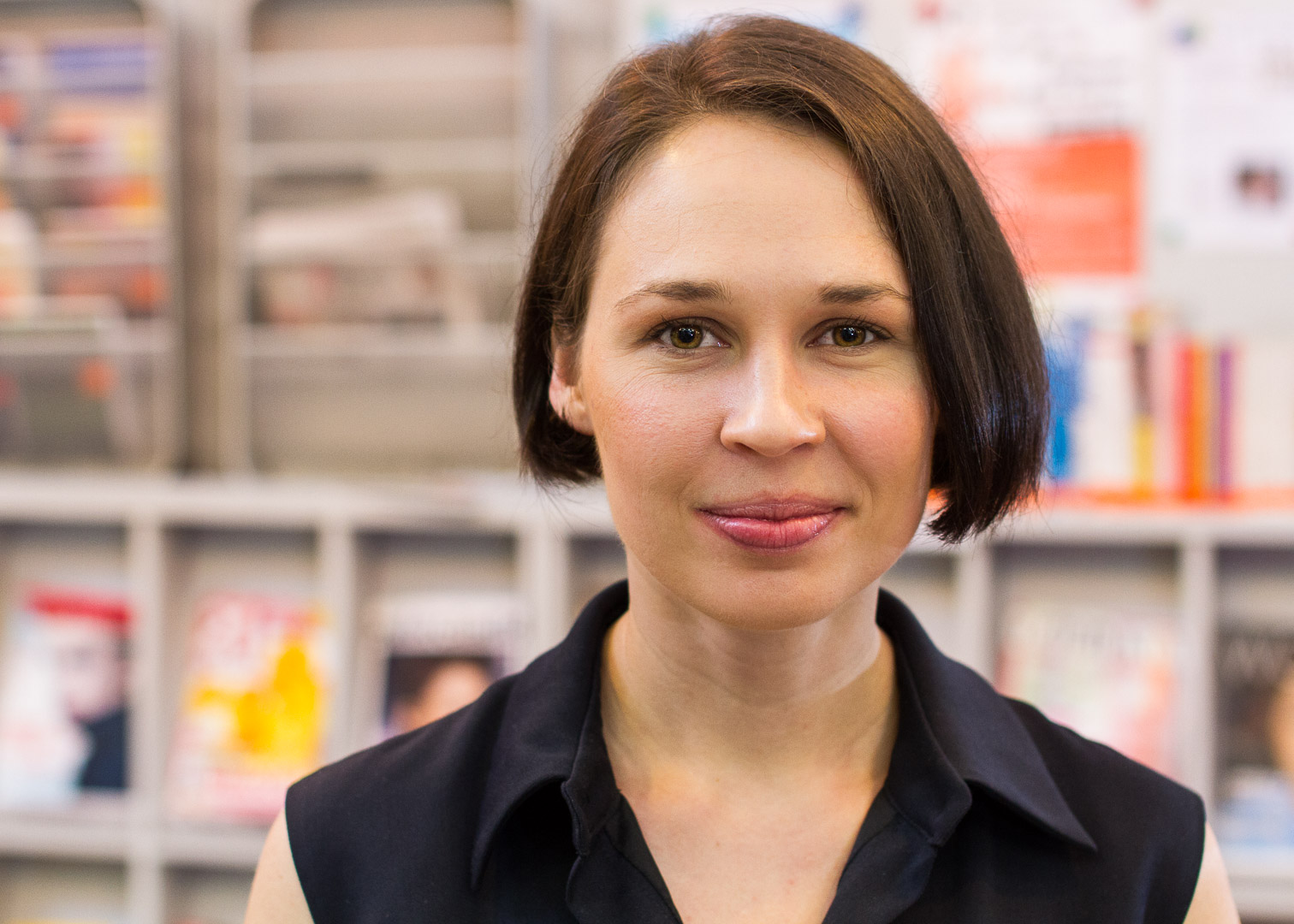
- Andrukhovych in Wrocław, 2015
- Born: 17 November 1982 (age 43); Ivano-Frankivsk, Ukrainian SSR, Soviet Union
- Occupations: Writer; translator
- Spouse: Andriy Bondar
- Relatives: Yurii Andrukhovych (father)

Sofia Yuriyivna Andrukhovych (Ukrainian: Софія Юріївна Андрухович, born 17 November 1982) is a Ukrainian writer and translator. She is the wife of Andriy Bondar, Ukrainian writer.

== Life and career ==
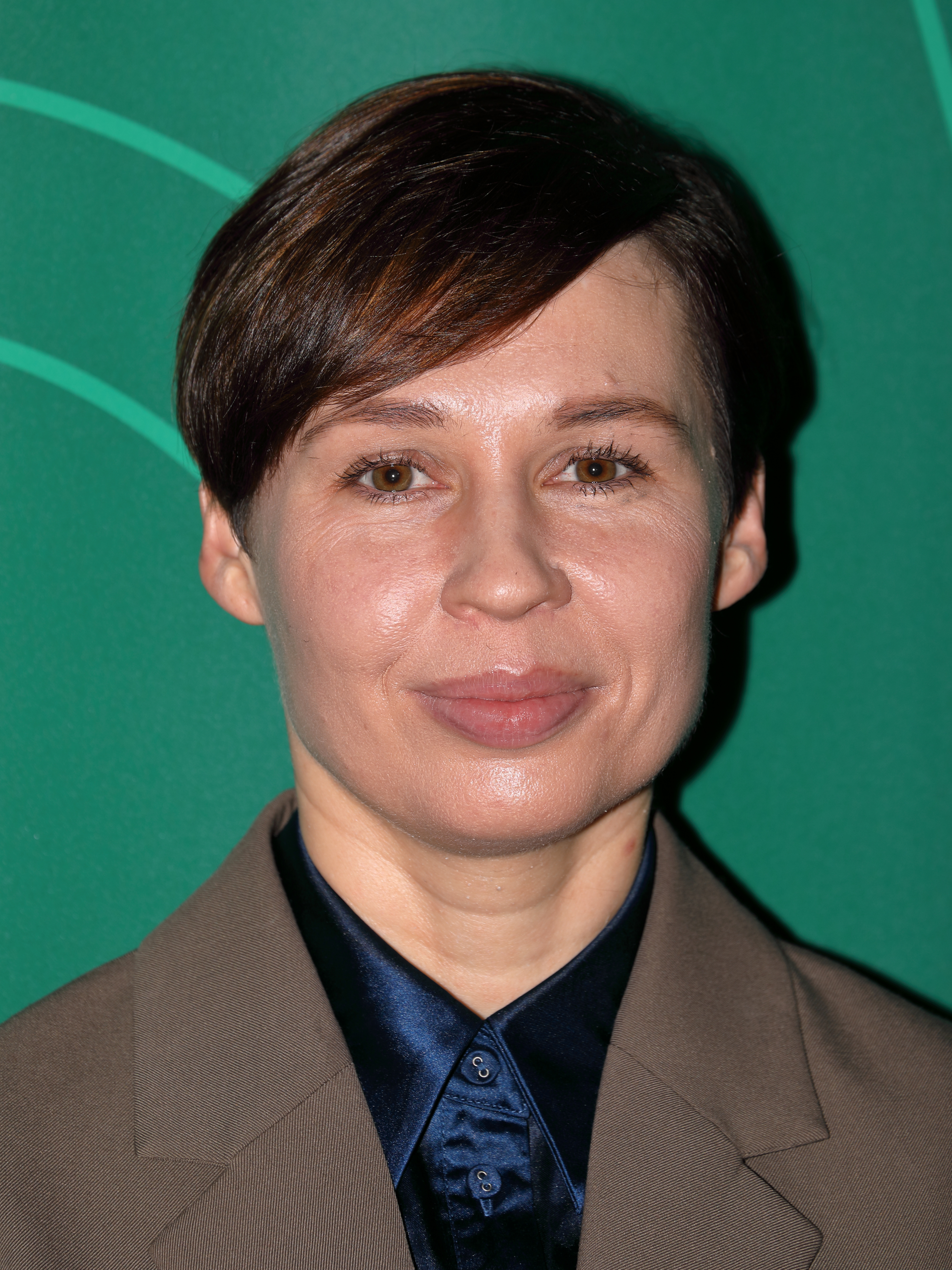
Andrukhovych at the Buch Wien 2024

Sofia Andrukhovych was born in Ivano-Frankivsk, the daughter of Yurii Andrukhovych. She is married to a Ukrainian writer Andriy Bondar, with whom she has a daughter Varvara, born 10 March 2008.

Andrukhovych is a co-editor of Chetver periodical. In 2004 she received a residence grant from Villa Decius Association in Kraków where she used to live. She now resides in Kyiv.

In December 2014, her novel Felix Austria won BBC Ukrainian's Book of the Year 2014 award. An additional publication inspired by the novel's contents, was a recipe book compiled with Marianna Dushar. A Ukrainian-Polish feature film Viddana by director Chrystyna Syvolap was released in 2020.

In March 2021, she received the Women in Arts Award in literature.

== Publications ==
=== Prose ===
- Літо Мілени (Kyiv, 2002).
- Старі люди (Ivano-Frankivsk, 2003).
- Жінки їхніх чоловіків (Ivano-Frankivsk, 2005).
- Сьомга (Kyiv, 2007).
- Фелікс Австрія (Lviv, 2014).
  - English translation Felix Austria forthcoming March 2024.
- Амадока (Lviv, 2020)
- Катананхе (Kyiv, 2024).

=== Translations ===
- Manuela Gretkowska. Європейка. Translation from Polish.
- J. K. Rowling. Гаррі Поттер і келих вогню. Translation from English (together with Viktor Morozov].

== See also ==
- List of Ukrainian-language writers
- List of Ukrainian literature translated into English
