= Felix Austria (novel) =

2014 novel by Sofiia Andrukhovych

- Book cover of 2024 English translation
- Author: Sophia Andruckhovych
- Original title: Фелікс Австрія
- Translator: Vitaly Chernetsky
- Language: Ukrainian
- Genre: Historical Fiction, Gothic Fiction
- Publisher: Old Lion Publishers, Harvard University Press [in English]
- Publication date: 2014
- Publication place: Ukraine; USA
- English publication date: 2026
- Media type: Hardcover
- Pages: 250
- ISBN: 978-0674291393 (2026 edition)

Felix Austria (Ukrainian: «Фелікс Австрія») is a novel by Ukrainian writer Sofiia Andrukhovych, published in 2014 by Old Lion Publishers.

The events happened at the beginning of the 20th century in Stanyslaviv, Austria, a city in the eastern part of the Empire (nowadays Ivano-Frankivsk, Ukraine). The novel is written in a style of a diary, every chapter being about a particular memory from Stefaniia’s, the main hero’s, life.

The book got recognition from Ukrainian critics, as well as the broad public abroad. Felix Austria has been translated into German, Polish, Czech, Hungarian, Croatian, and French. The novel became a laureate of many Ukrainian and foreign prizes and received various honors and awards.

== Plot ==
The events happened at the end of the 19th - the beginning of the 20th century in Stanyslaviv, Austria, a city in the eastern part of the Empire, which nowadays is Ivano-Frankivsk, Ukraine. Felix Austria has in the center the story of a lifelong relationship between the mistress Adelia Anger and her servant Stefaniia Chornenko. After the two survived a life-changing childhood tragedy, where their parents died in the fire, they were bound to be together.

Regardless of their constant conflicts and arguments, the girls can not imagine their life without each other. At the beginning of the novel, they visit various plays in theaters, entertaining performances, and even go together for a honeymoon when Adelia and Petro get married. After realizing he is stuck in a love triangle, Petro wants to get rid of Stefa, explaining that she should build her own life. However, Stefaniia is scared that her mistress will not survive on her own.

One evening a former student of Doctor Anger and an old friend of both girls, priest Josyf Ridny, comes over to visit the household; meanwhile, Stefaniia recalls all childhood and youth insults from Adelia. In a couple of days, Stefa comes to see Josyf to ask for confession, after which she unexpectedly sees Adelia and is curious to know what she is doing there alone and why she would need to see the priest.

However, their attention quickly shifted to Petro, who found a boy in his workshop. The boy has a rare disease that makes his joints extremely flexible, allowing him to hide anywhere. Adel decides to keep the boy, and later Petro chooses for the boy the name Feliks. He causes many troubles to the couple by hiding away for three days, painting over Dr. Anger's maps, but soon Petro becomes closer to the boy while Adelia struggles to get in touch with him.

Ernest Thorn, a magician from a circus troupe, comes to visit the family to take Feliks back, telling about his background story and suggesting compensation for the boy. Adelia immediately agrees, but Stefa refuses to do so. On her way to the clothing store, Stefaniia meets Velvele, who tells her about the rumors that she cannot live without her mistress and suggests she leaves with him to go overseas and start a new independent life, but she immediately rejects the offer.

Stefa's preparation for Adelia's birthday party does not go very easy as she sees how Josef, away from people's eyes, gave Adelia a piece of clothing and soon finds out that it was Adelia's stocking. After Petro and Adel left, Stefaniia read through Adelia's diaries to learn more about her and Josef's relations. However, she finds a letter written by Dr. Anger, where he explains his regret about adopting Stefa.

After having a couple of drinks at Adelia's birthday party, Stefa accused Adelia in front of all guests of having an affair with Josef. The relationship between the girls worsened, and Adelia explained all the misunderstandings that made Stefa suspicious of the infidelity. Stefa's emotions take over, and she accidentally starts a fire in the house. While the fire bursts, the statue where Feliks liked to hide, falls together with all the stolen jewelry from the temples. Meanwhile, Stefa gets rid of her illusions and plans to go overseas with Velvele.

== Main heroes ==
- Stefaniia Chornenko (Stefa) — the main hero, Ukrainian, the narrative comes from her perspective. Orphan, was adopted by Dr. Anger after the destructive fire, where her parents died. Became Dr. Anger’s servant, soon - lived with Adel and Petro and was their servant. Found her destiny in serving Adel’.
- Doctor Anger — Adel's father, adopted Stefa when her parents and his wife died in a fire. Raised Adelia and Stefa together, making Stefa believe that she cannot leave Adel’ alone.
- Adel’ Skolyk (Adelia) — Dr. Anger’s daughter, grew up together with Stefa. Half Polish, half German. Married Petro, was accused to have an affair with Yosyp Ridny.
- Petro Skolyk — a headstone sculptor, Ukrainian, studied in Vienna. Adel’s husband.
- Feliks — a child found in Petro's workshop. Had hyperelastic joints and stole valuables from temples and churches for Ernest Thorn.
- Ernest Thorne — a magician, Feliks’ mother participated in his circus troupe. Used Feliks to steal from temples.
- Yosyp Ridny — Dr. Unger’s student, later became a priest, Ivanka's husband.
- Ivanka Ridna — Josyp’s wife, bad at doing household duties, sick.
- Velvele — young Jewish, fish trader, offered Stefa to leave with him across the ocean.

== Writing ==
Andrukhovych has been writing the novel for over a year. Throughout the story, Andrukhovych uses various Galician dialectisms (Ukrainian: га́лицький го́вір), which is explained in the footnotes, to convey the atmosphere of the locale better. The main heroes live on Lypova Street, Stanislaviv, now Shevchenko Street, the city of Ivano-Frankivsk, where her parents live. Except for searching for inspiration in historical works about her hometown published in the “Moye Misto” series, Sofiia Andrukhovych also used the newspaper “Kurjer Stanisławowski,” issued at the beginning of the 20th century as a reference for the XX-century daily atmosphere and analyzed the life of local people.

When she started writing her novel, Andrukhovych lived in Krakow, in a dormitory named “Felix,” where she lived on a “Gaude Polonia” scholarship. After her father, Yurii Andrukhovych, found out about it, he suggested naming the book after the Austro-Hungarian slogan: Bella gerant alii, tu felix Austria, nube (Let others wage war, but you, happy Austria, marry).

The first edition of the book cover had the “Along the Shore” (1914) painting by Joseph Edward Southall. In 2019, The Old Lion Publishing House released an updated edition with a new front cover designed by Svitlana Dorosheva.

== Themes ==
One of the central themes explored in the book is the search for identity, internal conflicts, and human self-doubt. This struggle is represented by Stefaniia and her life within the limits she has set for herself. Throughout the book, the reader can see how Stefa has tied her life to her mistress, totally forgetting her own personality and setting aside decisions concerning her private life. Her unwillingness to break the promise she gave herself to take care of Adelia does not allow her to fully realize her worth of love, independence, and respect. However, while the narrative develops, Stefaniia goes through personal transformation, which Chernetsky compared to "an assertive postcolonial identity transformation."

This power dynamics between girls opens up a discussion about intertextual references to famous 20th-century female writers from Western Ukraine. Vitaliy Chernetsky, in his article "Sofiia Andrukhovych's Felix Austria: the postcolonial neo-Gothic and Ukraine's search for itself," discusses that: The references to Ol'ha Kobylians'ka are especially strong and numerous, in the emotionally intense relationship between female characters echoing her "Valse mélancolique," and also in the emotionally intense, homoerotically charged correspondence she carried on with Lesia Ukraïnka; Stefaniia's last name, Chornen'ko, directly hints at the latter, as khtos' chornen'kyi, "someone dark-haired," was the cryptonym for Kobylians'ka used in the correspondence."

== Rewards and acknowledgements ==
- 2014 — Special Award of Lviv Book Forum
- 2014 — BBC Book of the Year
- 2014 — Ukrainian Prize LitAccent of the Year
- 2015 — Kovalevykh Foundation Prize
- 2016 — Visegrad Eastern Partnership Literary Award

The novel is included into the “From Kulish to the Present-day: 100 Iconic Novels and Short Stories in Ukrainian” list compiled by PEN Ukraine.

== Reception ==
The book received wide recognition among critics in Ukraine and abroad, provoking robust discussions. One of the critics, Ievhen Stasinevych, noted the “various homages, witty winks at the reader, serious paraphrases and fruitful interpretive allusions,” emphasizing the importance of this literary work. Alongside Stasinevych, Andrii Drozda also highlighted Andrukhovych’s attempt to trick the readers as the illusionist Ernest Thorn - while she points out the beautiful pieces of art and sculpture, she quickly creates drama and intrigue and promptly dissolves it.

Nevertheless, Vladyslav Ivchenko poses many questions to the text and the author and concludes his critique in a negative way, highlighting that Andrukhovych created the book only for self-pleasure, without caring about the readers.

== Translations ==
In 2016, Felix Austria was translated into German and published by the Austrian publishing house "Residenz Verlag" under the title "Der Papierjunge" ("The Paper Boy"), translated by Maria Weissenböck. In the summer of 2016, the book was published in Poland. Moreover, the novel was translated into Czech, Hungarian, Croatian, and French. The book was translated into English by Vitaly Chernetsky and as of January 2026 is awaiting publication by Harvard University Press.

== Adaptation ==
Film.UA Group acquired the rights to film the novel. Nadiya Zayonchkovska became the movie producer on a partnership basis and worked with Khrystyna Syvolap as the director.

The role of Stefania is played by the Polish actress Marianna Januszewicz, and the roles of Adele and Peter are played by Olesya Romanova and Roman Lutsky, respectively. The movie was released in Ukraine on January 16, 2020.

The text of the audio performance (2016) is read by Sonia Sotnyk, accompanied by the composer and musician Yevdokym Reshitko
