= History of Ukrainian literature =

The History of Ukrainian literature includes laws of the historical and literary process, literary genres, trends, works of individual writers, features of their style, and the importance of artistic heritage in the development of Ukrainian literature.

Ukrainian literature has a thousand-year history. Its beginnings date back to the formation of Kievan Rus. However, even in prehistoric times (before the ninth century), the ancestors of Ukrainians had a developed oral art.

== Literature of Rus ==
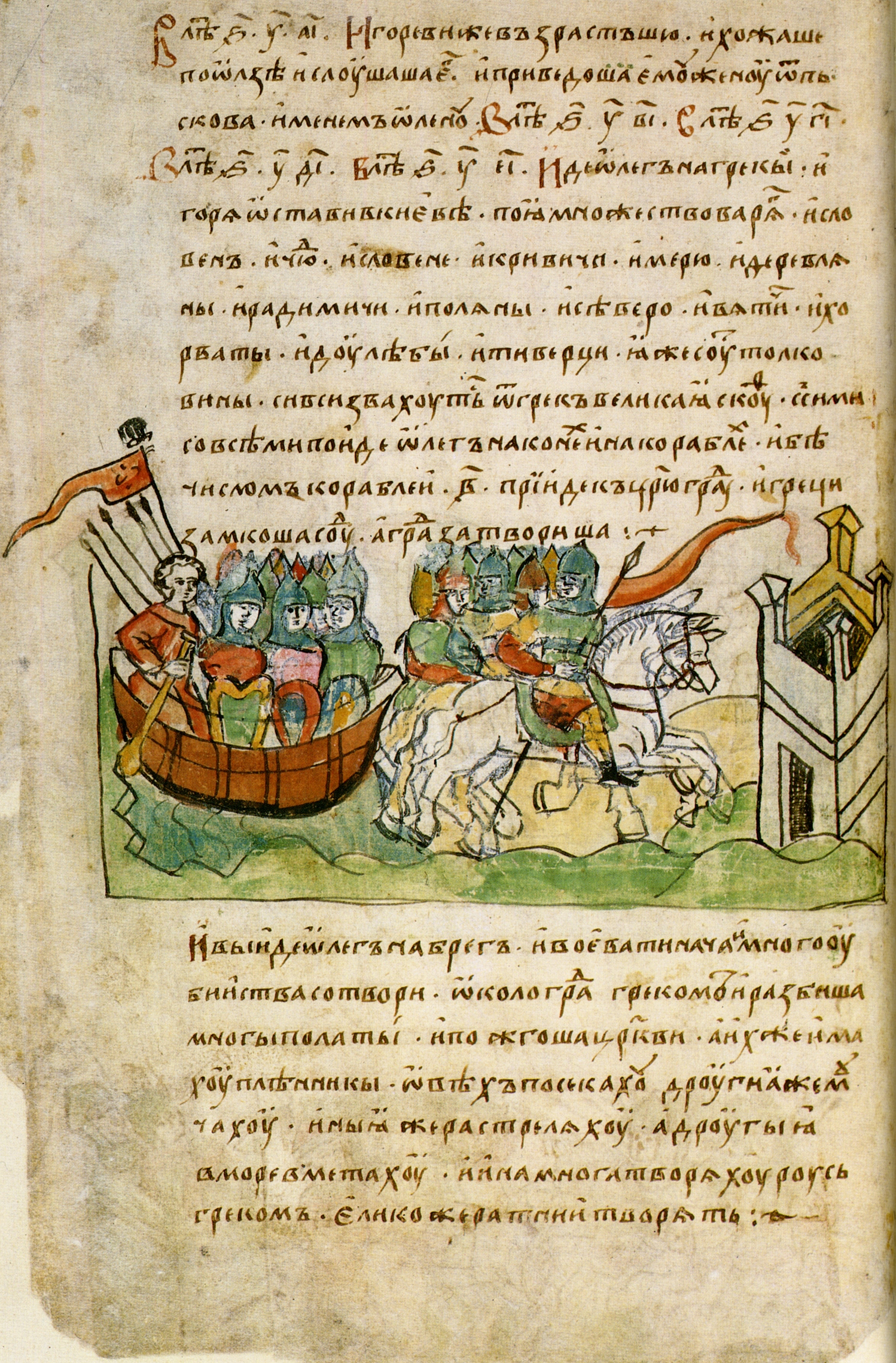
"The Tale of Past Years"

First works of literature in medieval Rus had a religious character and were influenced by the Byzantine Greek literary tradition. Early examples of written culture in Rus lands include the Ostromir Gospels (1057) and the Tmutarakan stone of prince Gleb Sviatoslavich (1068), as well as the Sermon on Law and Grace by Hilarion of Kiev. The latter has many common features with the most outstanding written monument of Kievan Rus, the chronicle Tale of the Past Years, which is not only a source of historical information but also a textbook of epic songs and legends of the era.

Didactic literature of the Rus period includes writings by prominent religious and political figures such as Theodosius of Pechersk, Vladimir Monomakh, Kliment Smoliatich, Kirill of Turov and others, as well as hagiographic works, such as the Kyiv Caves Patericon.

Some Rus chronicles also include elements of epic poetry. Epic tradition of the Rus culminated in The Tale of Igor's Campaign, a poetic masterpiece of medieval literature most likely created in the late 12th - early 13th century. According to Ukrainian literary critic Filaret Kolessa, The Tale is distinct from the rest of old Rus literature due to its entirely secular character, and its creation was likely inspired by traditions of folk poetry. This heroic epic absorbed the best examples of folk art of that time and became the property and pride of the whole Slavic world.

The main literary work created in the territory of modern-day Western Ukraine in the 13th century is the Galician-Volhynian Chronicle. Many of its passages are characterized with a colourful language reminiscent of secular epic literature. The chronicle is a valuable historical source and an important document of medieval European literature.

== Late Medieval and Early Modern Ukrainian literature ==
The Mongol invasion of Rus started a period of cultural decline, which continued for three centuries. Original works of literature created between mid-13th and mid-16th century in the territory of modern-day Ukraine are very rare. The number of compilations and rewritten works also declined during that time. This period is characterized by significant influence of Bulgarian culture on the literature of former Rus. The language used in written works created in Ukrainian ethnic territories during that era also contains some features influenced by Czech (especially in Galicia) and Belarusian languages. Translations and compilations of Western Catholic literature were also present.

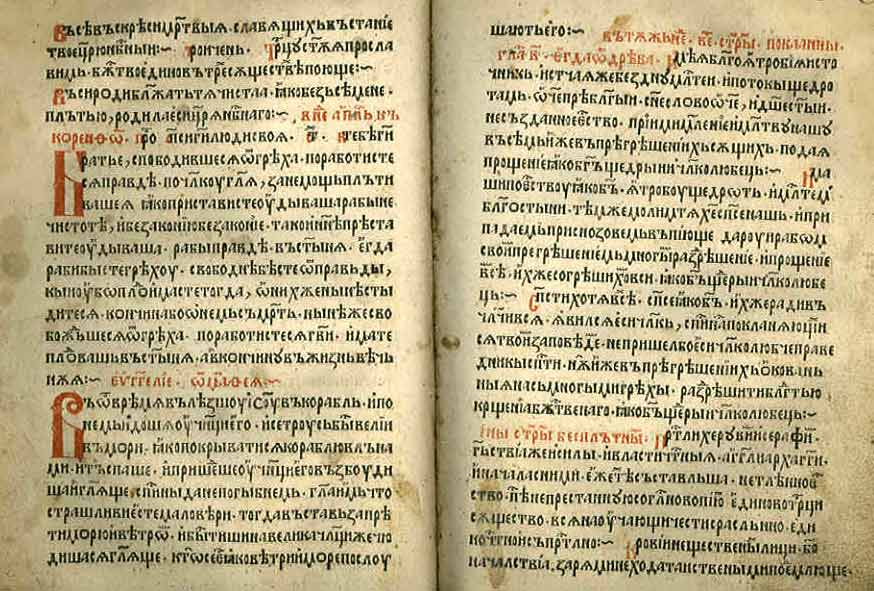
Schweipolt Fiol's Octoechos

A milestone in the history of Ukrainian and other Slavic literatures was the introduction of bookprinting. Among the first Slavic book publishers was Schweipolt Fiol, a native of Germany, who in 1491 opened the first Cyrillic printing press in Kraków and produced Orthodox religious literature. Judging from linguistic elements present in the books printed by Fiol, it is theoretized that his workers or customers may have stemmed from today's Ukraine.

In the mid-16th century literary tradition in lands of modern Ukraine saw a rise in activity due to the influences of Protestant Reformation. One of the authors inspired by Protestant ideas during that time was Stanisław Orzechowski, a Latin-language writer from a mixed Catholic-Orthodox family born in the Ruthenian Voivodeship of Poland, near the modern-day Polish-Ukrainian border. Orzhechowski's works argued for the protection of Orthodox Ruthenian traditions inherited from old Rus and condemned Catholic practices such as rebaptism and celibacy.

Another event which contributed to the development of a new literature in Ukrainian lands was the calendar reform introduced by the Catholic Church in 1582. Protesting against decrees prohibiting the Orthodox faithful from celebrating their feasts according to the old calendar, in 1587 Herasym Smotrytsky, rector of the Ostroh Academy, issued a pamphlet in defence of the Orthodox faith and Ruthenian people. Smotrytskyi's literary activities were supported by Konstanty Wasyl Ostrogski, an Orthodox Ruthenian prince and voivode of Kyiv.

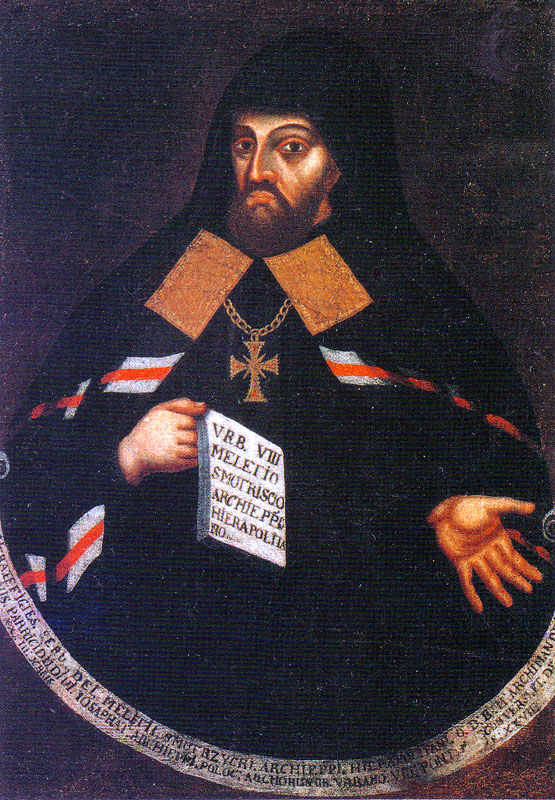
A posthumous portrait of Meletius Smotrytsky, 18th century

An important representative of early modern literature in Ukrainian lands was Ivan Vyshenskyi, an Orthodox monk from Galicia, who issued numerous polemic writings opposing the Union of Brest and defending the Lviv Orthodox brotherhood from Catholic persecution. Vyshenskyi's pamphlets were issued specifically for the population of "Little Rus", as Ukraine was known during that time, and corresponded with notable figures such as bishop Meletius Smotrytsky, and prince Ostrogski. Among Vyshenskyi's followers were Zacharias Kopystensky, Stefan Zyzanii and Yurii Rohatynets, who also created polemic literature in defence of the Orthodoxy. During the 1590s a group of writers emerged in Ostroh, the cultural and educational centre of Ukrainian lands in the Polish-Lithuanian Commonwealth. Most prominent among them was Demian Nalyvaiko, a fierce critic of the Uniate Church. Their opponent in polemics was Ipatii Potii, Uniate metropolitan of Kyiv.

Literature of Ruthenian (Ukrainian and Belarusian) lands of the Polish-Lithuanian Commonwealth also included works of political satire, some of which have been preserved to our day. Valuable memoirs from that time belong to Bozhko Balyka, a patrician from Kyiv, who travelled to Moscow during the Polish-Muscovite War in the early 17th century. Early modern period also saw the spread of poetry in Ukrainian lands, greatly contributed by the works of the Ostroh literary circle. An original genre of literature which emerged in Ukraine during that time were epic folk songs known as dumas, which were usually dedicated to the deeds of Cossacks.

== Ukrainian literature during the 17-18th centuries ==
Economic decline of cities under the pressure of landed gentry, as well the abolition of Orthodox hierarchy by Polish Catholic authorities, led to the decrease in cultural activities among the urban classes of today's Western Ukraine during the 17th century. As a result, the development of Ukrainian literature continued further to the east, in the lands of Dnieper Ukraine centered around Kyiv. Cultural development of that area was seriously influenced by Zaporozhian Cossacks, who used their political influence over the Commonwealth to support Ukrainian Orthodox clergy. This process was especially active during the hetmanate of Petro Sahaidachny. The main centre of literary activities and publishing emerged in Kyiv Pechersk Lavra, represented by authors and publishers such as Pamvo Berynda, Zacharias Kopystensky, Taras Zemka, Yelysei Pletenetskyi, Tymofii Verbytskyi, Spiridon Sobol, and Oleksandr Mytura.

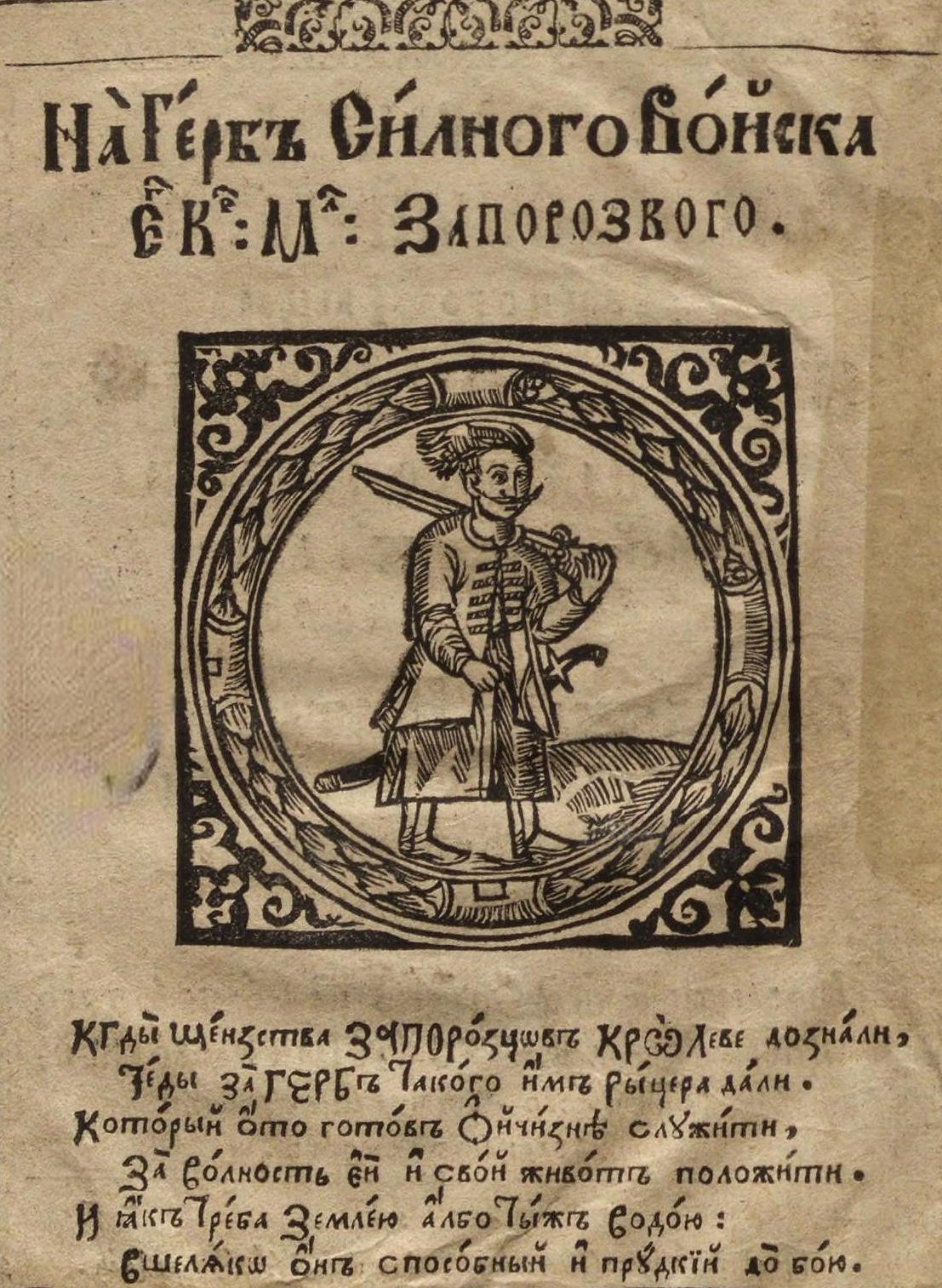
A page from Kasian Sakovych's Verses on the mournful burial of noble knight Petro Sahaidachny, 1622

Orthodox brotherhoods presented another important centre of literary activity in early 17th-century Ukraine. In Kyiv and Lutsk their members organized own schools, which provided education in Greek, Latin and Church Slavonic. A prominent author from Kyiv during that period was Kasian Sakovych, rector of the Kyiv Brotherhood School (future Kyiv-Mohyla Academy), known for his panegyric poem written for the burial of hetman Sahaidachny. The renewal of Orthodox hierarchy by Polish authorities in 1621-1622 contributed to a new literary discussion. This period in Ukrainian literature saw the emergence of the idea of Ukrainian Cossacks being a continuation of the old Rus state centered around Kyiv. Cultural orientation of Ukrainian authors during that time can be seen as an intermediary position between the Polish-Latin West and Oriental Muscovy.

A prominent figure of Ukrainian literature in the mid-17th century was Petro Mohyla, Orthodox Metropolitan of Kyiv, who was a creator of several works in the sphere of religious literature. Several works written by poets from Kyiv's orthodox schools were dedicated to the metropolitan during his lifetime. Activities of the Kyiv Brotherhood school, transformed by Mohyla into a collegium, contributed to the establishment of Baroque as the dominant style in the literature of Ukrainian lands during that era. Baroque period saw the emergence of new historical works such as the Hustyn Chronicle, Cossack chronicles of Samiilo Velychko and Hrabianka, as well as the Chronicle of Samovydets, which describe the events of Ukrainian history during the 16th and 17th centuries. Those chronicles inspired two important ideological works, which attained popularity in Ukraine during the Hetmanate and Russian Imperial eras: the Kievan Synopsis (1674) by Innokenti Gisel's circle and the History of the Ruthenians (first published in 1846). The latter text provided basis for the development of modern Ukrainian national identity.

Unlike Baroque, the style of Classicism, which came to prominence in the 18th century, didn't develop in Ukraine to a similar extent. Due to the abolition of Ukrainian autonomy in the second half of the century, both the Orthodox clergy and the political elite adopted Russian as their primary language. Classicist poets of Ukrainian origin, such as Ippolit Bogdanovich and Vasily Kapnist, became one of the most prominent representatives of this style in Russian literature. At the same time, the era of Classicism accelerated the process of transition from the old Ukrainian literary language, significantly influenced by Church Slavonic, to the new one, which was closer to speech used by the common people.

== New Ukrainian literature ==
=== Under Russian rule ===
At the end of the 18th century Ivan Kotliarevsky's burlesque travesty narrative poem Eneida marked the emergence of Ukrainian literary language and the beginning of modern Ukrainian literature. This work depicted ancient epic heroes and gods as the author's Ukrainian contemporaries, reflecting the richness of common Ukrainian speech and giving a valuable insight into the material culture of that era. Kotliarevsky also wrote the first plays in modern Ukrainian language: Natalka Poltavka and Moskal-Charivnyk. The humorous and satirical tone of Kotlyarevsky's works was picked up by other writers, primarily members of the so-called Kharkiv circle (most prominently Petro Hulak-Artemovsky, Hryhoriy Kvitka-Osnovyanenko), as well as Vasyl Hohol-Yanovsky. The first prose works in Ukrainian - Marusya, Konotopska vidma, and Saldatsky partret - were written by Kvitka-Osnovyanenko, who became the founder of modern Ukrainian fiction, breaking the tradition of using Ukrainian language only in comedic genres.

Starting from the late 1820s, Romanticism was adopted as a new style in Ukrainian literature. Poets of the so-called Kharkiv School of Romantics (Amvrosy Metlinsky, Mykola Kostomarov, Levko Borovykovsky, M. Petrenko, Yakiv Shchoholiv and others) made a great contribution to the development of Ukrainian literature. In Kyiv Romantic movement was boosted by activities of the Brotherhood of Saints Cyril and Methodius. Many romantic authors, such as Izmail Sreznevsky, also engaged in ethnographic work, publishing Ukrainian folk poetry, songs, proverbs etc. During that time so-called "Ukrainian schools" appeared in Russian and Polish literatures, most prominently represented by Yevhen Hrebinka and Tomasz Padura respectively.

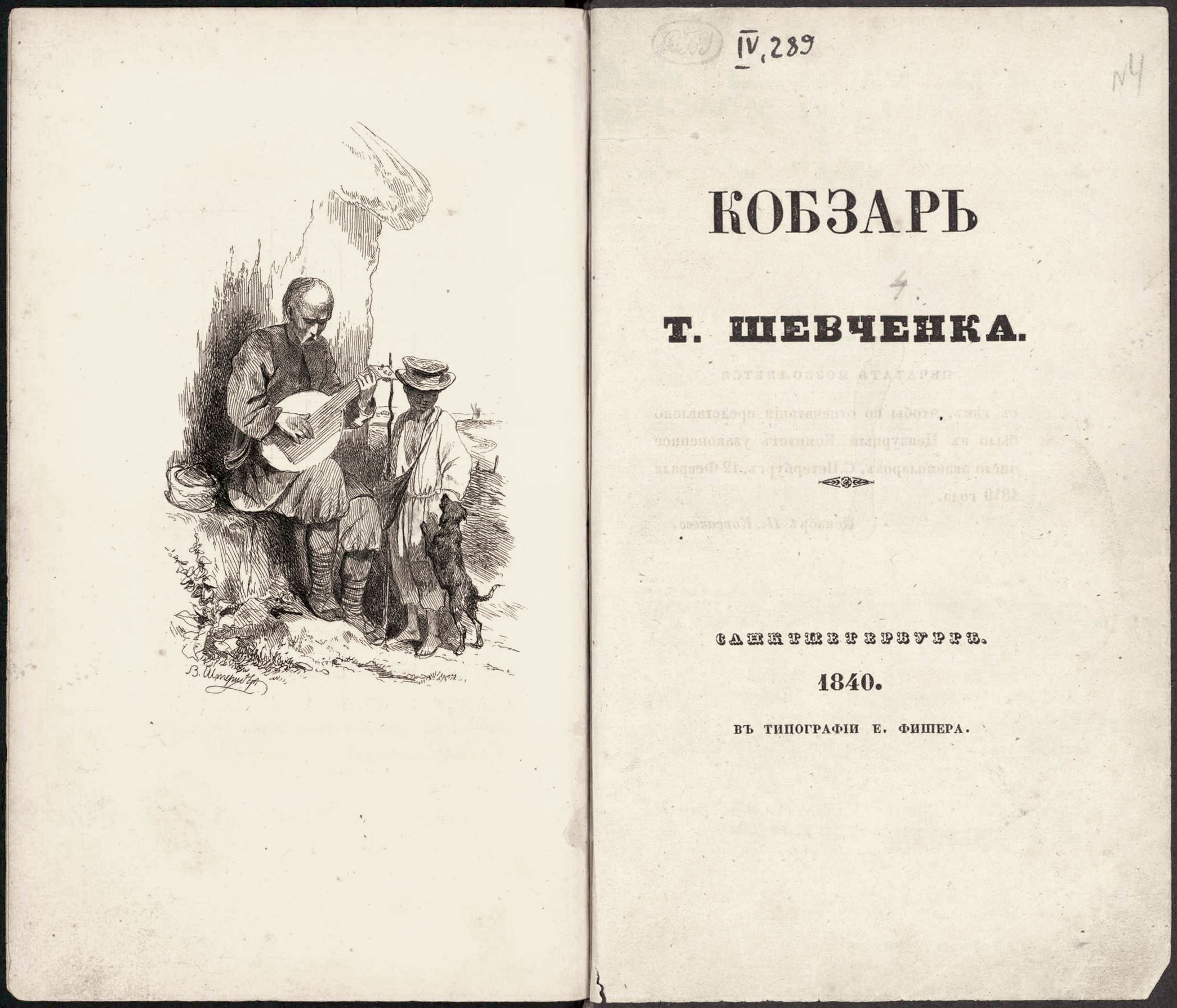
First edition of Kobzar by Taras Shevchenko, 1840

The most outstanding Ukrainian writer of the 19th century was Taras Shevchenko – a poet, artist, author of prose and dramatic works. He debuted in 1840 with his collection of poems Kobzar, followed by the poem Haidamaky (1841) and play Nazar Stodolia (1843). Shevchenko's latter poems Dream (1844), Caucasus, Naimychka , To the dead, and living..., Heretic (all 1845) sharply criticized Russian imperial rule over Ukrainians and other subjugated peoples, which eventually resulted in their author's exile by the tsarist government.

Despite the House of Romanov's colonial policy of coercive Russification of Ukraine, which included the 1863 Valuev Circular and 1876 Ems Ukaz, Ukrainian literature continued to develop and achieved significant success during the period of Realism. Among pioneers of Ukrainian realist prose were Anatol Svydnytsky and Oleksandr Konysky. Prominent authors from Russian-ruled parts of Ukraine during the second half of the 19th century included Leonid Hlibov, Panteleimon Kulish, Marko Vovchok, Marko Kropyvnytskyi, Oleksa Storozhenko, Ivan Nechuy-Levytsky, Panas Myrny, Mykhailo Starytsky. Starting from the mid-19th century, ethnographic realism achieved prominent positions in Ukrainian literature, being most prominent in the works of authors such as Hanna Barvinok and Stepan Rudansky. During that period ethnographic works and studies of Ukrainian folklore were published by prominent Ukrainian activists and scientists such as Volodymyr Antonovych, Mykhailo Drahomanov, Alexander Potebnia. A series of Ukrainian fables with satirical elements were created by Leonid Hlibov.

Among important Ukrainian authors of the late 19th and early 20th centuries were Ivan Karpenko-Karyi, Ivan Manzhura, Borys Hrinchenko, Mykhailo Kotsiubynsky, Lesya Ukrainka, Volodymyr Vynnychenko, Pavlo Hrabovsky, Mykola Voronyi, Oleksandr Oles, Spyrydon Cherkasenko and Arkhyp Teslenko, who made a significant contribution to the development of Ukrainian literature under the Russian rule. Ukrainian dramaturgy during that period is characterized by a fusion of romanticism and ethnographic realism, and is most prominently represented by works by Mykhailo Starytsky, Marko Kropyvnytsky and Ivan Tobilevych. Notable works of Realist poetry were created by Pavlo Hrabovsky and Olena Pchilka.

=== Under Austro-Hungarian rule ===
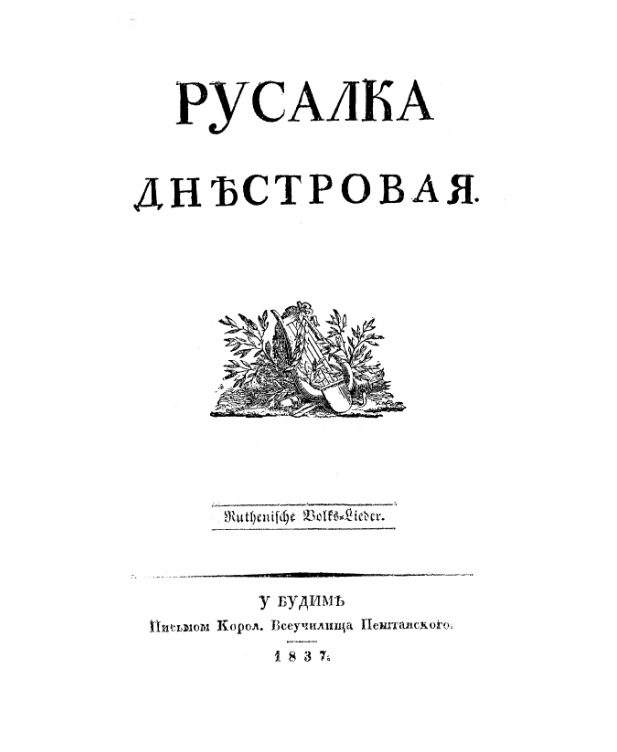
Title page of the almanac Rusalka Dnistrovaya published in Buda in 1837

In Western Ukraine Classicism with Baroque elements remained a dominant style into the 1830s. During that period local authors oriented themselves on the Russian literary tradition, but failed to achieve significant success. In Carpathian Ruthenia Vasyl Dovhovych created original verses with elements of common speech, and Mykhailo Luchkay followed the travesty tradition widespread in Dnieper Ukraine.

Starting from the late 1830s Ukrainian authors from Galicia (Eastern Europe) introduced themselves to the Romantic movement. This process was started by the publication of Rusalka Dnistrovaya, the first literary almanac to be published in common Ukrainian language, by members of the so-called Ruthenian Triad: Markiian Shashkevych, Yakiv Holovatskyi and Ivan Vahylevych. Works of literature from that period were published in Zoria Halytska, the first Ukrainian-language newspaper founded in 1848. Other prominent authors in Western Ukraine during the early and mid-19th century were Ivan Hushalevych, Ivan Mohylnytskyi, Mykola Ustyianovych and Yuriy Fedkovych.

In 1849 studies of Ukrainian literature became part of the curriculum of Lviv University, which contributed to further literary development in Western Ukraine. However, in the 1850s Moscophile ideas started dominating in Galician literature under the influence of Russian historian Mikhail Pogodin. An important representative of Sentimentalism in Carpathian Ruthenia during that time was Alexander Dukhnovych.

In Bukovina the transition from Romanticism to literary Realism took place under the influence of works by Yuri Fedkovych. In the second half of the 19th century Ukrainian literary revival under Austrian rule was spearheaded by the new generation of authors, most prominently Ivan Franko, Sydir Vorobkevych, Natalia Kobrynska, Olha Kobylianska, Osyp Makovei, Vasyl Stefanyk, Bohdan Lepkyi and others.

== 20th century ==
=== Ukrainian literary modernism ===
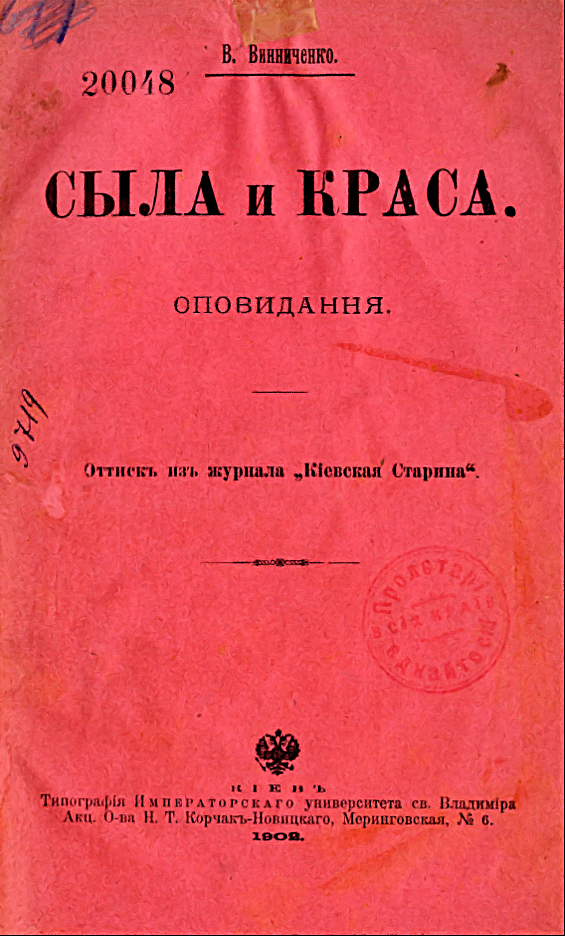
A cover of Strength and Beauty, an early novella by Volodymyr Vynnychenko

At the turn of the 20th century, Ukrainian authors started breaking with their previous orientation on rural topics under the influence of global trends. This led to the emergence of new movements in Ukrainian literature, such as Impressionism, Modernism, Decadent movement, Symbolism and Neo-Romanticism. Most Ukrainian authors of that time were not full-time professionals, but combined their literary activities with everyday jobs, which led to a slower development of literary process. Impressionist elements were first employed in Ukrainian literature by Mykhailo Kotsiubynsky. Neo-Romantic trends in Ukrainian prose were represented by Olha Kobylianska, Hnat Khotkevych, Lesia Ukrainka, Marko Cheremshyna and Stepan Vasylchenko. Along with Vasyl Stefanyk and Les Martovych, Cheremshyna abandoned the populist idealization of rural life in favour of a more sobering and critical perspective. Examples of heavily decorated historical prose from that period belong to Katrya Hrynevycheva.

The most famous Ukrainian prose writer of the pre-revolutionary era was Volodymyr Vynnychenko, whose realistic works were themselves partially inspired by early writings of Ahatanhel Krymsky. Other prominent early 20th-century Ukrainian Modernists of realistic direction were Spyrydon Cherkasenko, Arkhyp Teslenko, Osyp Makovei and Bohdan Lepky. Among prominent poets of the time were Dniprova Chayka and Volodymyr Samiilenko. An important force in the Ukrainian Modernist movement of Galicia was the "Young Muse" literary group, whose associates included Lepky, Stepan Charnetsky, Osyp Turiansky, Vasyl Shchurat and Oleksandr Oles. Another important figure in Ukrainian Modernist poetry of the early 20th century was Mykola Voronyi.

=== Ukraine under the Soviet rule ===
==== Revolution and early Soviet period ====
Front page of The City (1928) - an urban novel by Ukrainian author Valerian Pidmohylny

After the revolution, the literary process was particularly dramatic and complex in Ukraine, as in the entire USSR. On the one hand, Ukrainian literature at that time was experiencing an unprecedented zenith. On a rich literary palette, various art schools, styles, and trends coexisted – from radical proletarianism, whose theorists promoted the creation of a "purely proletarian culture" by "laboratory means" (V. Blaktyny, G. Mikhaylichenko, M. Khvylyovy) to futurism (M. Semenko) and even neoclassicism, whose representatives were guided by the creation of high harmonious art based on the development of classical samples of World Literature (a group of neoclassicists led by M. Zerov). At the same time, Ukrainian War of Independence led to the exile, death or fall out of favour of numerous Ukrainian authors from the previous generation.

A number of prominent young Ukrainian authors debuted during the revolutionary years of 1917-1921, including Mykola Zerov, Pavlo Tychyna, Klym and Valerian Polishchuk, Geo Shkurupiy, Hryhorii Kosynka, Vasyl Ellan-Blakytny, Mykola Khvylyovy, Volodymyr Sosiura and Maik Yohansen. That period in Ukrainian literature was dominated by the Futurist and Symbolist movements. A notable representative of Ukrainian Futurism was Mykhail Semenko. Semenko and his followers took part in the creation of a number of literary groups, such as Aspanfut and Nova Generatsiia. An alternative direction in Ukrainian literature of the 1920s was represented by the Neoclassicists, whose members included Zerov, Mykhailo Drai-Khmara, Oswald Burghardt and Maksym Rylsky. In their turn, "proletarian" authors, such as Ellan-Blakytny, Khvyliovy, Sosiura, Yohansen, Petro Panch, Dokiya Humenna and others, centered their activities around the Hart and Pluh literary organizations.

In 1925–1928, a "literary discussion" was held – a public discussion about the ways of development, ideologies, aesthetic orientation, and objectives of the new Ukrainian Soviet literature, the place, and role of the writer in society. The discussion arose due to deep differences in understanding of the nature and purpose of artistic creativity among Ukrainian writers, and the ideological and political competition of literary organizations. Initiated by Khvyliovy and his supporters Mykola Kulish, Mykhailo Yalovy, Oleksa Slisarenko, Arkadiy Lyubchenko and Mykola Zerov, the discussion resulted in the official condemnation and dissolution of VAPLITE by Communist Party leadership, and the creation of VUSPP, which followed the official party line in fight against "bourgeois nationalism". In 1931, most former VAPLITE members entered VUSPP following the dissolution of their own literary organization, Prolitfront. In 1932, on the initiative of Joseph Stalin, all "proletarian" literary organizations in Ukraine were dissolved and replaced with the government-controlled Soviet Writers' Union of Ukraine.

Among prominent Ukrainian novelists of the Soviet era the names of Yuriy Yanovskyi, Yuriy Smolych, Valerian Pidmohylnyi, Borys Antonenko-Davydovych, V. Domontovych and Zinaida Tulub should be mentioned. In the sphere of lyrical poetry during the Interwar period, notable works were created by Mykola Bazhan, Todos Osmachka, Yevhen Pluzhnyk, Ivan Bahrianyi and Volodymyr Sosiura. Ukrainian drama works of the period are represented by figures such as Myroslav Irchan and Mykola Kulish.

==== Executed Renaissance and aftermath ====
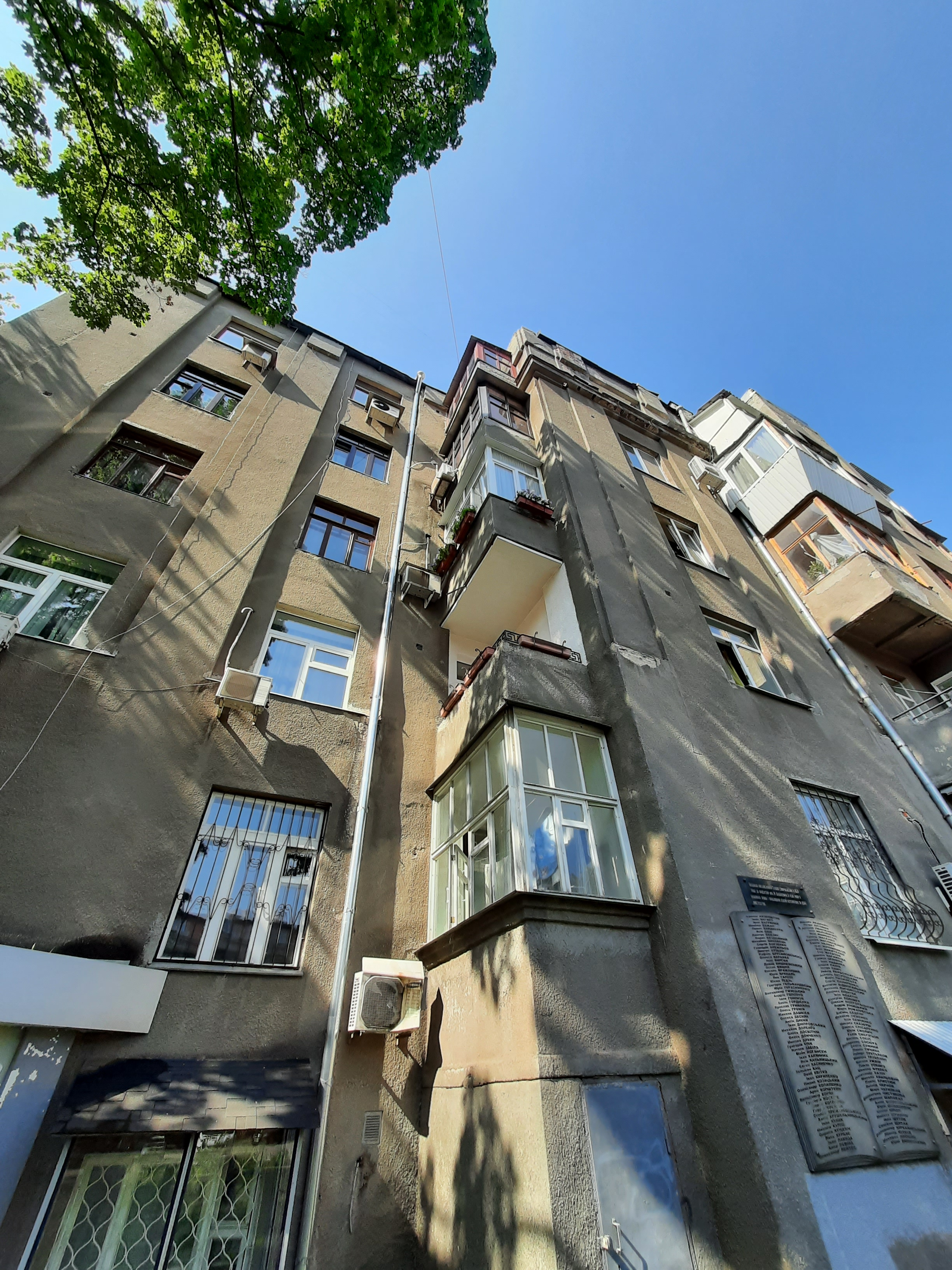
Slovo Building in Kharkiv, where many prominent representatives of the Executed Renaissance resided

Most representatives of the post-revolutionary wave of Ukrainian revival died during the Civil War, the Holodomor of 1932–33, Red Terror, and the Bolshevik repressions of the Great Purge of the 1930s. In 1938–1954, about 240 Ukrainian writers were repressed, although many of them were supporters of the Soviet government, fought for it, and became writers after the revolution. Some of them were shot, some died in prison, and the fate of some of them remained unknown after the arrests. The poet M. Rylsky, recognized by the Soviet authorities, was arrested and spent 10 years in the camps on charges of participating in a mythical Ukrainian military organization. H. Kosynka, M. Zerov, M. Kulish, Y. Pluzhnyk, and M. Semenko were shot. M. Khvylovy, who tried to save many comrades, committed suicide. The Experimental Theater "Berezil" was also banned, and its head – the world-famous director Les Kurbas – was arrested and shot. This generation of writers in the history of Ukrainian literature has become known as – "Executed Renaissance."

As a result of government repressions, the period between 1933 and 1941 saw a decline of literary activity in Ukraine. Most works produced during that time followed the line of official propaganda, and many of them had to be rewritten in order to comply with the officially imposed doctrine of Socialist realism. Notable authors of that period included Andriy Malyshko, Leonid Pervomayskiy, Natan Rybak etc. Following the disbandment of Berezil Theatre, Ukrainian troupes were also employed for the purpose of political agitation. The most prominent Ukrainian author of drama works during that time was Oleksandr Korniychuk.

==== WW2 and aftermath ====
As a result of the Second World War, Soviet authorities were forced to make certain concessions to Ukrainian authors and increase their artistic freedom. Among figures which reemerged on the Ukrainian literary scene during that time was Ukrainian writer Ostap Vyshnya. However, soon after the war's end, a new wave of repressions started after accusations of "Ukrainian nationalism" were made against many authors. A new generation of Ukrainian literators became prominent after the war, with Oles Honchar and Mykhailo Stelmakh being among its most notable authors. During that period, Kharkiv lost its role as the centre of Ukrainian literary development. In Lviv, local literary circles were dominated by loyalist authors such as Iryna Vilde and Stepan Tudor.

Despite the rigid framework of the Soviet style of Socialist realism, Ukrainian writers managed to create literature that has not lost its relevance today. These are, first of all, works by P. Tychyna, M. Rylsky, V. Sosiura, O. Dovzhenko, O. Honchar and others.

=== Western Ukraine and diaspora ===
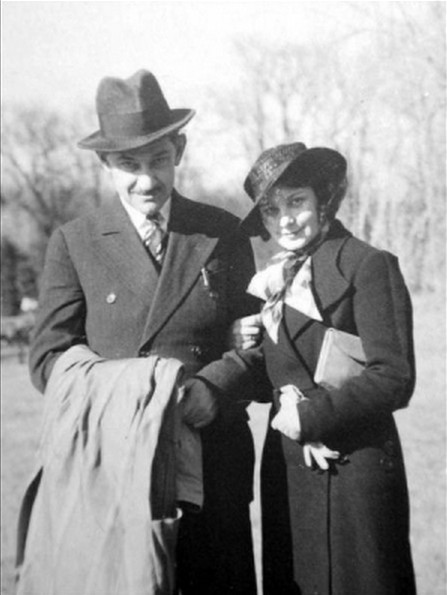
Dmytro Dontsov and Olena Teliha during the late 1930s

An important element of Ukrainian literature dedicated to the events of World War I and Ukrainian War of Independence were the Sich Riflemen songs somposed by authors such as Roman Kupchynskyi and Mykola Holubets. A notable poetess of Western Ukraine during the post-WW1 era was Mariyka Pidhiryanka. A pro-Soviet line in Western Ukrainian literature during the Interwar period was represented by works of Antin Krushelnytskyi. Anti-Communists, in their turn, united around the figure of Dmytro Dontsov, who settled in Prague, cooperating with Yevhen Malaniuk and several other authors. Another diaspora author, Oksana Liaturynska, became known for her use of folkloric inspirations in literary works. Almost all Prague-based Ukrainian authors of the time, such as Leonid Mosendz and Oleh Olzhych, also published their works in Lviv. Several notable personalities of Western Urkianian and diaspora literature, most prominently Yuriy Lypa and Olena Teliha, became members of the Organization of Ukrainian Nationalists and Ukrainian Insurgent Army. Realist movement among that group was represented by the works of Ulas Samchuk.

During the 1930s, another Ukrainian literary group emerged in Warsaw under the name My ("Us"). A group of Catholic authors emerged in Lviv and was represented, among others, by Bohdan Ihor Antonych and Natalena Koroleva. A multifaceted personality of Western Ukrainian literature and art of the Interwar era was Sviatoslav Hordynskyi. Memoirs of that period period include the works of émigré figures such as Dmytro Doroshenko, Oleksander Lototsky and Yevhen Chykalenko. Notable female authors from Western Ukraine were Sofia Yablonska and Uliana Kravchenko.

In 1945, Artistic Ukrainian Movement (MUR) was created as a literary organization of Ukrainian diaspora. Notable Ukrainian émigré authors of the postwar era included Dokia Humenna, Ivan Bahrianyi, Ulas Samchuk, Todos Osmachka and Vasyl Barka. Literary discussion in diaspora circles was promoted by the disputes between "organists" led by Yuriy Sheveliov, and their opponents of "European" orientation.

== Contemporary Ukrainian literature ==
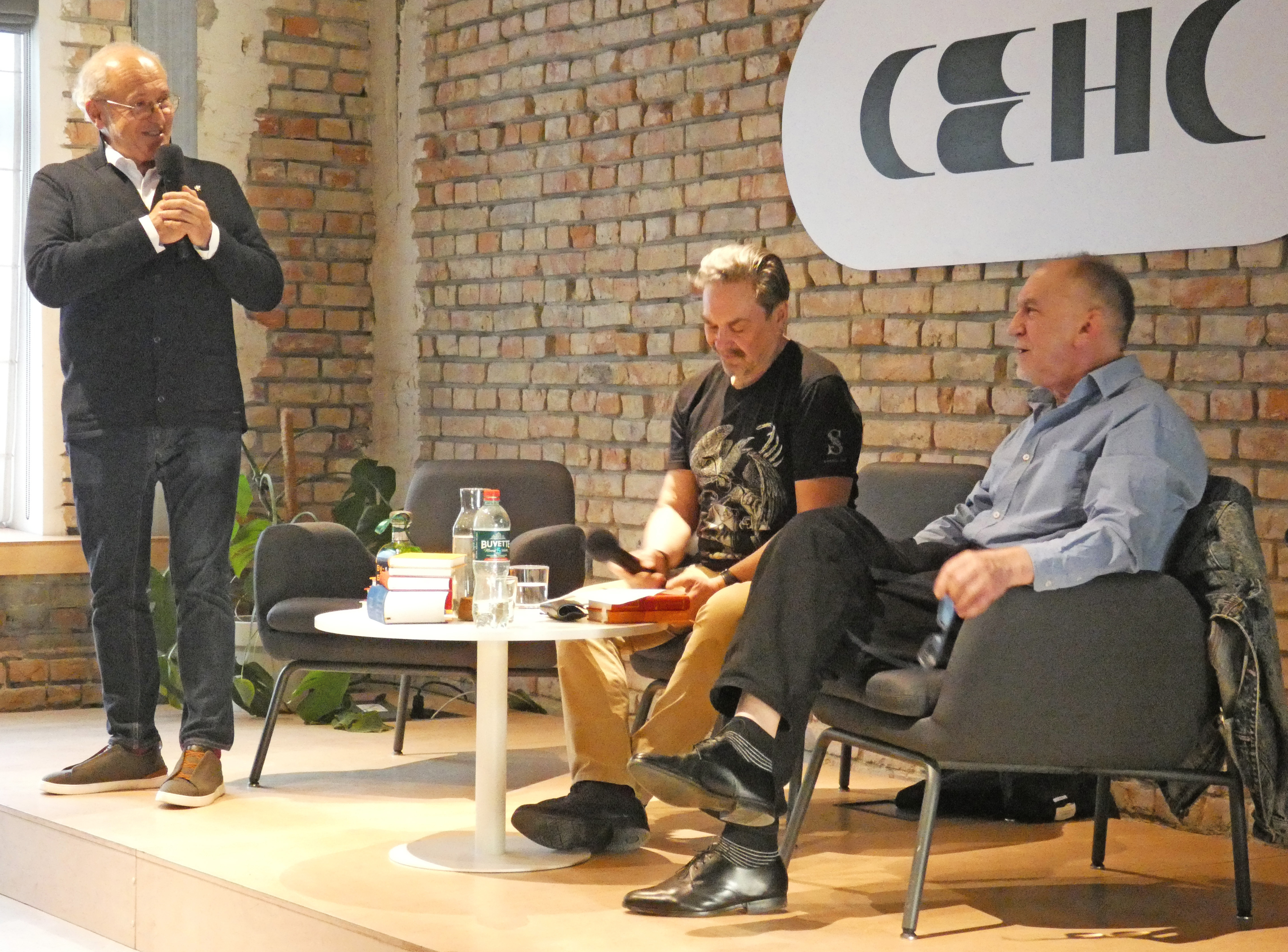
Ivan Malkovych, Yurii Andrukhovych and Oleksandr Irvanets during an event dedicated to the 40th anniversary of Bu-Ba-Bu literary group

Modern Ukrainian prose is the Ukrainian literature of recent decades, created by modern writers. the scientific literature does not specify exactly from what point Ukrainian literature should be considered modern. However, the concept of "modern Ukrainian literature" is most often understood as a set of works of fiction – written from the time of Ukraine's independence in 1991 to the present. This distinction is due to the disappearance after 1991 of the generally binding style of socialist realism for artists of the USSR and the abolition of Soviet censorship. Fundamental changes in Ukrainian literature occurred during the years of Perestroika (1985) and especially after the Chernobyl disaster (1986). Some researchers believe that modern Ukrainian literature begins in the 1970s after the generation of the Sixties.

== See also ==
- Ukrainian literature
- Executed Renaissance
- Contemporary Ukrainian literature
- Ukrainian war literature (post-2014)
- Samizdat
- Ukrainian Book Institute
- The Forest Song
- Lesya Ukrainka
- Taras Shevchenko

== Sources ==
- В. М. Лесин, О. С. Пулинець Словник літературознавчих термінів. «Радянська школа», Київ, 1971
- http://litopys.org.ua/chyzh/chy02.htm
- Історія України / Керівник авт. Ю.Зайцев. Вид.2-ге зі змінами. //- Львів: Світ, 1998. – с 207 −212
- Котляр М., Кульчицький С. Шляхами віків: Довідник з історії України// – К.: Україна,1993 – с 108–109.
- Український самвидав: літературна критика та публіцистика (1960–і – початок 1970–х років): Монографія / О. Є. Обертас. – К. : Смолоскип, 2010. – 300 c.
- Українська література в контексті соціокультурних перетворень ХХ століття: монографія / Т. Л. Шептицька; М-во освіти і науки України, Київ. нац. ун-т ім. Т. Шевченка. – Київ: ВПЦ «Київ. ун-т», 2013. – 151 с.

== Bibliography ==
- Історія української літератури: у 12 т. / редкол. : Віталій Дончик (голова) [та ін.]; Нац. акад наук України, Ін-т літ. ім. Т. Г. Шевченка НАН України. – Київ: Наукова думка, 2013 . – ISBN 978-966-00-1299-8.

Т. 1 : Давня література (Х – перша половина ХVI ст.) / [Юрій Пелешенко та ін.]; наук. ред. : Юрій Пелешенко, Микола Сулима; передм. Миколи Жулинського. – 2013. – 838 с. : іл. – 300 пр. – ISBN 978-966-00-1357-5 (т. 1): Т. 2 : Давня література (друга половина XVI–XVIII ст.) / [М. Сулима та ін.]; наук. ред:. Віра Сулима, Микола Сулима. – 2014. – 838, [33] с. : іл. – 300 пр. – ISBN 978-966-00-1358-2 (т. 2): Т. 3 : Кін. XVIII – кін. 30-х років ХІХ ст. / 2016. – 752 c.
Т. 4. Тарас Шевченко / І. М. Дзюба; ред.: М. Г. Жулинський. – 2014. – 781, [48] c.

- Історія української літератури ХІ – XVIII ст. : навч. посіб. / П. В. Білоус. – К. : Акад., 2009. – 424 c. – (Альма-матер). – Бібліогр.: с. 416–423.
- Історія української літератури кінця XVIII – 60-x років XIX століття: підручник / Л. М. Задорожна; Київ. нац. ун-т ім. Т. Шевченка. – 2-ге вид., переробл. та доповн. – К., 2008. – 479 c. – Бібліогр.: 87 назв.
- Історія української літератури ХІХ ст. : Підруч. для студ. філол. спец. вищ. навч. закл.: У 2-х кн. Кн. 1 / М. Г. Жулинський, М. П. Бондар, О. І. Гончар, Б. А. Деркач, Ю. О. Івакін, І. В. Лімборський, Л. З. Мороз, Є. К. Нахлік, В. Л. Смілянська, П. М. Федченко. – К. : Либідь, 2005. – 656 c. – Бібліогр.: с. 627–639.
- Історія української літератури ХIХ століття: Підруч. для студ. філол. спец. ВНЗ: У 2-х кн. Кн. 2 / М. Г. Жулинський, М. П. Бондар, Т. І. Гундорова, Л. О. Гаєвська, М. П. Кодак. – К. : Либідь, 2006. – 711 c. – Бібліогр.: с. 686–698.
- Українська література XX століття: моногр. / Микола Ткачук. – Тернопіль: Медобори, 2014. – 608 с.
- Історія української літератури ХХ – поч. ХХІ ст. : навч. посіб. : у 3 т. Т. 1 / В. І. Кузьменко, Гарачковська Оксана Олександрівна, М. В. Кузьменко, Т. В. Бикова, В. С. Брюховецький. – Київ: Академвидав, 2013. – 588 c.
