= Ukrainian Book Institute =

State organisation in Ukraine

- Parent institution: Ministry of Culture
- Established: 2016
- Location: Ukraine
- Website: ubi.org.ua

The Ukrainian Book Institute is a state institution under the Ministry of Culture of Ukraine. It is designed to shape state policy in the book industry, promote book reading in Ukraine, support book publishing, encourage translation activities, and popularize Ukrainian literature abroad.

== History ==
The Ukrainian Book Institute was established in 2016. Rostislav Semkiv was the first elected "acting" director of the institution, and in June 2017, the Institute had an "official" director — Tatiana Teren. She managed to lay the foundations of its activities: prepare documentation, organize working conditions. Six months later, Teren left. Prior to the election of the next director, the duties of the head of the Institute were performed by Sergey Yasinsky, then by Ruslan Mironenko. According to the results of the new competition, which took place on July 26, 2018, the winner was Olexandra Koval, director of the NGO "Forum of publishers." She started working as acting director on October 10, 2018. On December 12, Olexandra Koval was officially appointed to the post.

== Activities ==
=== Functions ===
- funding translations to and from Ukrainian
- implementation of state programs related to the popularization and support of reading
- organization and holding of competitions for the publication of books at public expense that have not yet been published
- implementation of residency programs for artists
- initiation of research and surveys on the publishing sector in Ukraine, forecasting its development
- support for publishers-Ukrainian and foreign, engaged in Ukrainian-language books
- development and organization of events to support Ukrainian book publishing
- establishing communication between publishing business entities
- cooperation with the media

=== Applications ===
1. The promotion of Ukrainian literature abroad — international projects, participation in foreign book fairs, creation of a global network of partners and people interested in Ukrainian literature.
2. The translation support program promoting the emergence of translations of Ukrainian literature by providing grants for foreign publishers.
3. The Ukrainian book program supports and promotes the development of the Ukrainian book market through financing new publications.
4. The digital library program is a project to create a complete digital database of Ukrainian classics, new books and rare publications available to everyone.
5. The reading promotion program in Ukraine is a number of national projects aimed at improving the level and quality of reading of the population.
6. The public library replenishment program-replenishment of public library collections throughout Ukraine with up-to-date publications.

=== Public Library replenishment program ===
In 2018, the Ukrainian Institute of books fully implemented the program of replenishment of public libraries, which began on October 5. For its implementation, the state provided ₴120 million, redistributing funds from the Ukrainian Book program. The Institute's team managed to implement it in an extremely short time.

The Ukrainian Book Institute received 2,779 applications from 137 publishers for consideration. The expert council selected from among them 741 books for purchase at state expense. A meeting of the tender committee, negotiation procedures with publishers, a meeting of the Supervisory Board, and publication of concluded contracts in the Prozorro system were held. According to the results of the program, public libraries received 984,449 copies from 91 publishing houses, which cost ₴114,397,900.

== International events ==
=== Frankfurt Book Fair ===
Presentation of national stands at book fairs and festivals abroad is one of the main tasks of the Institute. In 2018, an important achievement was the successful participation of Ukraine in the Frankfurt Book Fair, the largest publishing event in the world.

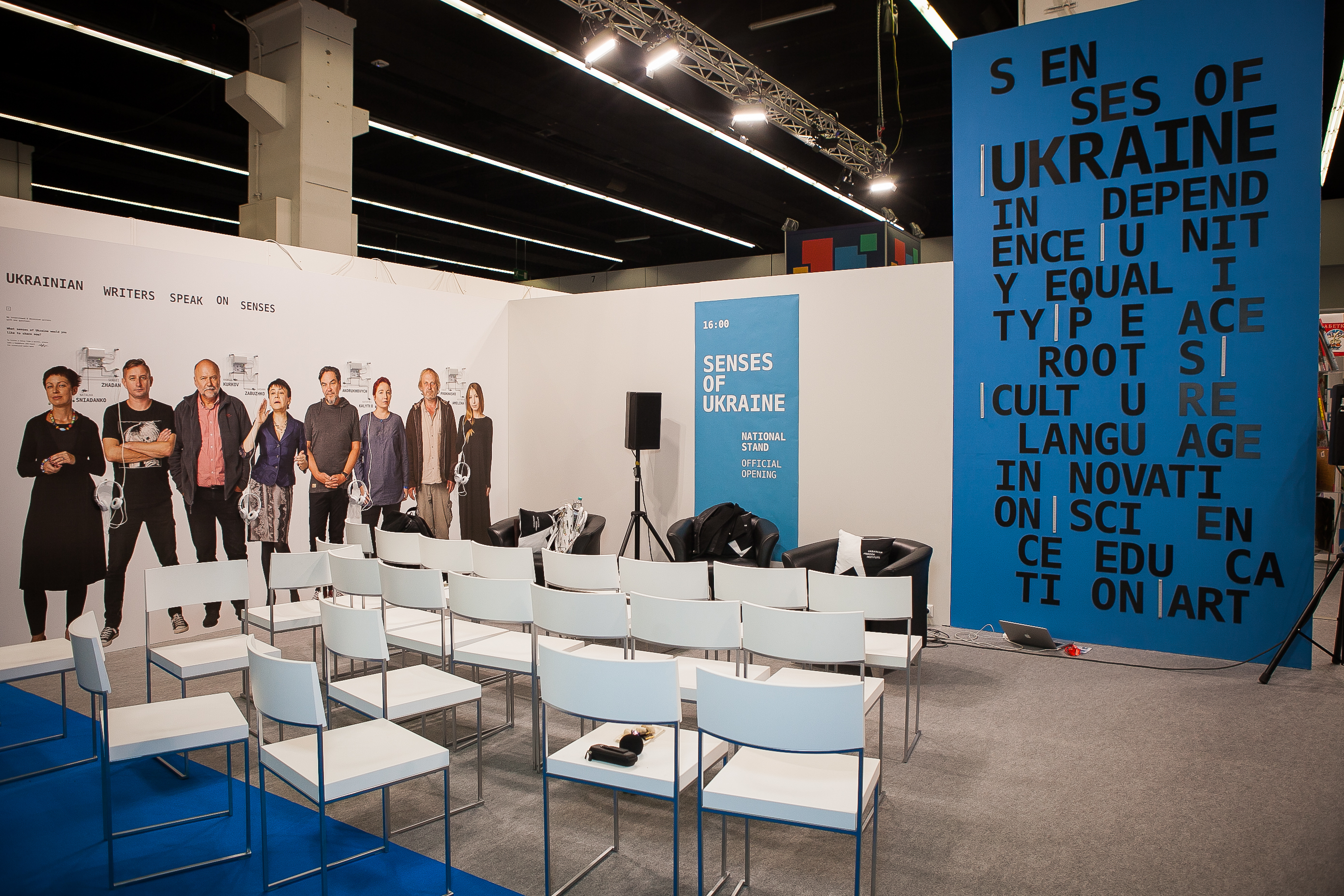
"Senses of Ukraine" was the slogan of the Ukrainian stand at the Frankfurt Book Fair in 2018

"Senses of Ukraine" was the slogan of the Ukrainian stand of 2018. It carries the double meaning of the English word senses — "sensations" and "meanings." The organizers taught about Ukraine using basic sensations: hearing, sight, touch, and taste. The visual concept of the Ukrainian stand was developed by Andrey Linik, a media artist, art historian, and curator of multimedia projects.

In an area of 140 square meters, you could see full-length images of the most famous Ukrainian writers and listen to what the "Senses of Ukraine" are to them. Also, with the participation of the Mystetskyi Arsenal, an interactive VR Zone "Getting to know Tukoni" was developed, based on Oksana Bula's books "Tukoni - a resident of the forest," "Bison Looks For A Nest," and "Bear Does Not Want to Sleep."

The opening of the Ukrainian stand was attended by the vice-president of the bookfair Tobias Foss. He addressed the guests together with Deputy Prime Minister of Ukraine Pavlo Rozenko, Deputy Minister of culture Yuriy Rybachuk, and chairman of the Association of publishers and book distributors Alexander Afonin.

One of the main attractions of Ukraine at the Fair was the illustrators, who were repeatedly recognized abroad. Their works were covered on the stand itself and in a separate catalog.

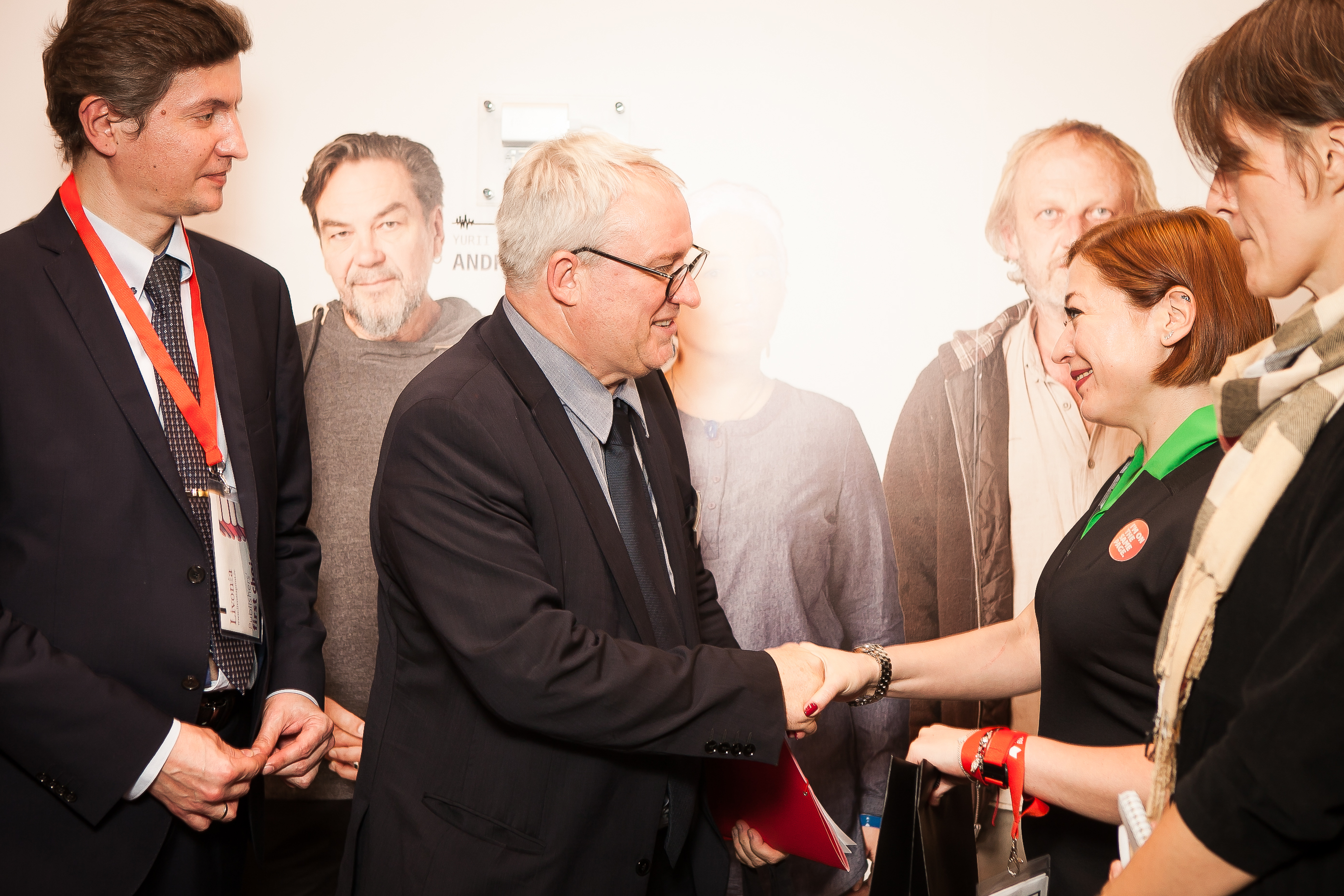
Tobias Voss, vice-president of the Frankfurt Book Fair, at the Ukrainian stand.

Along with the Ukrainian Book Institute, 16 publishers went to Frankfurt: "Th Old Lion Publishing House," "Folio," "Family Leisure Club," "Nash Format," Ivan Malkovich Publishing House - "A-ba-ba-ha-la-ma-ha," "Bohdan Books," "Fountain of Fairytales," "Summit Book," "KM books," "Perun," "Bright Books," "Lybid," "Art Nation," "Mamino," and the agency for cultural development.

Participants of the Ukrainian program were:

- Serhii Plokhy — historian, Professor at Harvard University, author of the books "Gates of Europe," "Chernobyl: a history of tragedy," and "Cossack myth"
- Yuri Durkot - best German translator of 2018
- Kateryna Kalytko — Ukrainian poet and writer, author of a number of poetry collections and a collection of short stories "Land of the lost"
- Victoria Amelina — Ukrainian writer, author of the books "Dom's Dream Kingdom," and "She did it"
- Evgeny Stasinevich - literary critic
- Mustafa Dzhemilev — Presidential Commissioner for the Crimean Tatar People, public figure, dissident, political prisoner
- Alim Aliyev - journalist, public activist, founder of the organization "Crimea SOS" and the center "Crimean house in Lviv," author of the book "Mustafa Dzhemilev: indestructible"

The "On the same page" campaign, dedicated to the 70th anniversary of the adoption of the declaration of human rights, has become an important focus of the Frankfurt fair. Within its borders, Ukraine organized an action in support of Ukrainian political prisoners who are illegally held on the territory of the Russian Federation. Famous writers read the stories of Oleg Sentsov, and staged a silent protest in front of the Russian stand.

=== Prague Book Fair "World of Books 2018" ===
The book Institute, together with the Embassy of Ukraine in the Czech Republic, organized a national stand at the Prague Book Fair "World of Books 2018." For the first time, a cultural institution participated in it, previously the stand was organized by local Ukrainians and representatives of the diaspora.

11 publishing houses took part in the Czech Fair: "A-ba-ba-ha-la-ma-ha," "Nash Format," "Old Lion Publishing House," "Komora," "Vydavnytstvo," "Perun," "Bright books," "Nebo Booklab Publishing," "Oko," "Book Chef" and the literary competition "Coronation of the Word." Among the writers, Ukraine was represented by Kateryna Kalytko, Iryna Tsilyk, Artem Chekh and Tanya Malyarchuk.

The Ukrainian stand was visited by the Minister of Culture of the Czech Republic Ilya Schmid, Ambassador of Ukraine to the Czech Republic Yevhen Perebiynis, and director of the State Book Institute "Czech Lit" Onjay Buddeus.

== Events in Ukraine ==
=== Publishers forum ===
The Ukrainian book Institute together with the NGO "Forum of publishers" became co-organizers of events at the 25th Book Forum.

The highest-profile event was "BookUp Night," during which publishing specialists talked about their funniest professional failures. It was attended by Ivan Malkovych, director of the publishing house "a-Ba-Ba-Ga-la-ma-ga," writer Oksana Zabuzhko, former editor-in-chief of the Ukrainian "Esquire" Alexey Tarasov, journalist and translator Irina Slavinskaya, and director of the publishing house "Nash Format" Anton Martynov.

In addition, the Ukrainian Book Institute organized a discussion about the film "The Wild Fields" based on Sergey Zhadan's bestseller "Voroshilovgrad." The film's director Yaroslav Lodygin spoke with Alexey Tarasov, representatives of the "Film UA" film studio and the author of a book about art at the intersection of literature and cinema. In addition, Lodygin presented footage of the film, which was released on November 8, 2018.

=== Creative Ukraine ===
The Ukrainian Book Institute team co-organized the seminar "Publishers' Guide: How to conquer Europe" within the framework of the forum "Creative Ukraine." The event was attended by Jax Thomas, director of the London Book Fair, who visited Ukraine for the first time. During her arrival, the participation of the Ukrainian stand in London was discussed. In addition, Thomas shared her experience in conducting large-scale literary events.

The seminar was also attended by Olga Brzezinska, president of the Krakow — City of Literature Foundation, board member of the New Art Foundation ZNACZY SIĘ, and program director of literary festivals. At the invitation of the Ukrainian book Institute, she held four meetings: she told Ukrainian publishers how to find their place in the market and develop their own brand, took part in a panel discussion, discussed issues with Forum visitors at the session, and conducted a public interview with Jax Thomas.

=== “The east reads” ===
The Ukrainian book institute became a partner of "The East Reads" project, where contemporary Ukrainian writers visited a number of libraries in the Luhansk and Donetsk regions. Through the mediation of the institute, more than two thousand Ukrainian books are being given to libraries. About 30 libraries in 15 localities took part in the project. It was organized by The Sergey Zhadan charitable foundation with the support of the International Renaissance Foundation.

Now Serhiy Zhadan, Andrey Kurkov, Evgeny Polozhiy, Ivan Andrusyak and Tanya Stus have already visited Starobilsk, Stanytsia Luhanska, Shchastia and Svatove.

They met with adults and children in local libraries, which became centers of social and cultural life here. Librarians and readers had the opportunity to communicate with the authors of books submitted to libraries in their cities as part of the program to replenish the collections of public libraries.

=== “Ukrainian Bookstore” ===
In early August 2023, the UIK put an end to the debate over the number of stationary bookstores in Ukraine and compiled all bookstore chains into one list. Initially, the UIK published data on 247 bookstores, and later this number increased to 378 (but it is not yet final). Thus, according to the UIC, as of August 2023, there are 378 bookstores in Ukraine,” said UIC director Oleksandra Koval.

== See also ==
- Ministry of Culture (Ukraine)
- Ukrainian Cultural Foundation
- Ukrainian literature
- History of Ukrainian literature
