= Aspanfut =

Ukrainian literary group (1921–1925)

Aspanfut (Ukrainian: Аспанфут, abbreviation from Асоціяція Панфутуристів - Asotsiyatsiya Panfuturystiv, "Association of Panfuturists") was a Ukrainian literary group established in 1921 in Kyiv. Among its prominent founding members were Mykhail Semenko, Oleksa Slisarenko and Geo Shkurupiy. The group's participants engaged in literary experiments, and their activities were seen as an attempt to put art in service of revolutionary propaganda. During a later period of its existence the organization was renamed into Association of Communist Culture (ASKK), also known as Aspankult-Komunkult. The group also established its own theatre, and its members worked on a number of movies.

Aspanfut's activities were based around the office of Bilshovyk newspaper edited by Semenko, which was located in the modern-day Ukrinform building. Among authors associated with the group were young authors Mykola Bazhan and Yuriy Yanovskyi. In 1923 panfuturists issued the "October collection", and in 1924 planned the creation of "October Arts Bloc" in cooperation with Berezil Theatre. Bazhan's contributions to the group resulted in the opening of its branch in Uman. Aspanfut eventually dissolved in 1924-1925, but many of its participants would later take part in Nova Generatsiia.
