= Orphanage (disambiguation) =

Orphanage is an institution dedicated to the care of orphans.

Orphanage or The Orphanage may also refer to:

== Film, television and video ==
- The Orphanage (company), California visual effects company founded in 1999
- The Orphanage (2007 film), Spanish horror drama directed by Juan Antonio Bayona
- The Orphanage of Iran, 2016 Iranian historical drama film directed by Abolqasem Talebi
- The Orphanage (2019 film), Danish-Afghan drama
- Orphanage the Haunting at Hollows Grove, 2014 American film
- "The Orphanage" (The Copenhagen Test), a 2025 television episode

== Music ==
- Orphanage, 1960s Irish band, featuring Phil Lynott and Brian Downey
- Orphanage (band), Netherlands metal band founded in 1993
- Orphanage, American rap group (List of Wu-Tang Clan affiliates#Orphanage)

== Other ==
- The Orphanage (book) (Інтернат, translit. Internat, lit. Boarding school), a 2017 Ukrainian novel by Serhiy Zhadan
- Orphanage Road in Birmingham, England
