= Zhadan i Sobaky =

Ukrainian ska band

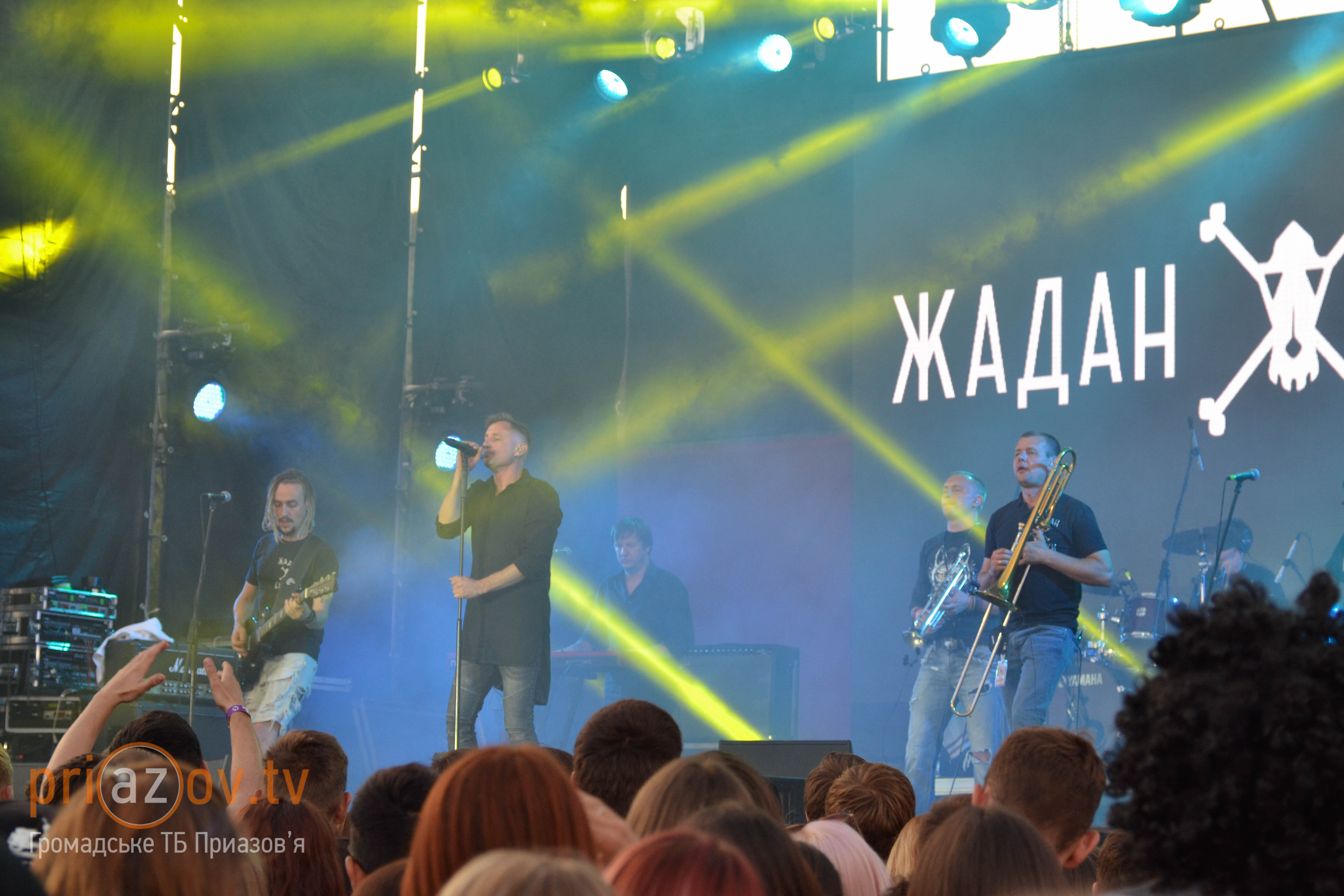
- Zhadan i Sobaky performing in 2017

Background information
- Origin: Kharkiv, Ukraine
- Genres: Ska punk
- Years active: 2000–present
- Members: Oleksandr Boldyryev; Andriy Pyvovarov; Ivan Pirozhok; Viktor Kondratov; Artem Dmytrychenkov; Serhiy Kulayenko; Serhiy Zhadan
- Website: sobaki.kh.ua%20svk

Zhadan i Sobaky (Ukrainian: "Жадан і собаки" [Zhadan and the Dogs]) is a Ukrainian ska punk band from Kharkiv founded in 2000 as Sobaky v Kosmosi (Ukrainian: "Собаки в космосі" [Dogs in the Outer Space]). After a long-term cooperation with Ukrainian writer Serhiy Zhadan the band changed its name to Zhadan i Sobaky.

== History ==
The band Sobaky v Kosmosi was formed in 2000. It released two studio albums by 2008 and performed at various Ukrainian festivals: Tavriyski Ihry, Raz. Liv, Muzychyi Ostriv, 5 ozer, MazepaFest, Den Nezalezhnosti z Makhnom, etc.

Since 2008 Sobaky v Kosmosi has collaborated with a famous Kharkiv-based writer Serhiy Zhadan. They collaborated on five studio albums: two under the label Serhiy Zhadan i Sobaky v Kosmosi, and three more as Zhadan i Sobaky.

As of now, Serhiy Zhadan is a lead vocalist of the bend and their lyrics author.

== Band members ==
- Oleksandr Boldyryev (vocals, guitar)
- Andriy Pyvovarov (bass, vocals)
- Ivan Pirozhok (trombone)
- Viktor Kondratov (drums)
- Artem Dmytrychenkov (trumpet)
- Serhiy Kulayenko (keyboards)
- Serhiy Zhadan (vocals)

== Discography ==
Sobaky v Kosmosi

- Vafli ("Вафли", 2002)
- Gruppa Ishchet Prodyusera ("Группа ищет Продюсера", 2008)

Serhiy Zhadan i Sobaky v Kosmosi

- Sportyvnyi Klub Armiyi ("Спортивний клуб армії", 2008)
- Zbroya Proletariatu ("Зброя пролетаріату", 2012)

Zhadan i Sobaky

- Byisya za Neyi ("Бийся за неї", 2014)
- Psy ("Пси", 2016).
- Madonna ("Мадонна", 2019)
