= Serhiy Zhadan =

Ukrainian poet, novelist, and translator (born 1974)

- Сергій Жадан
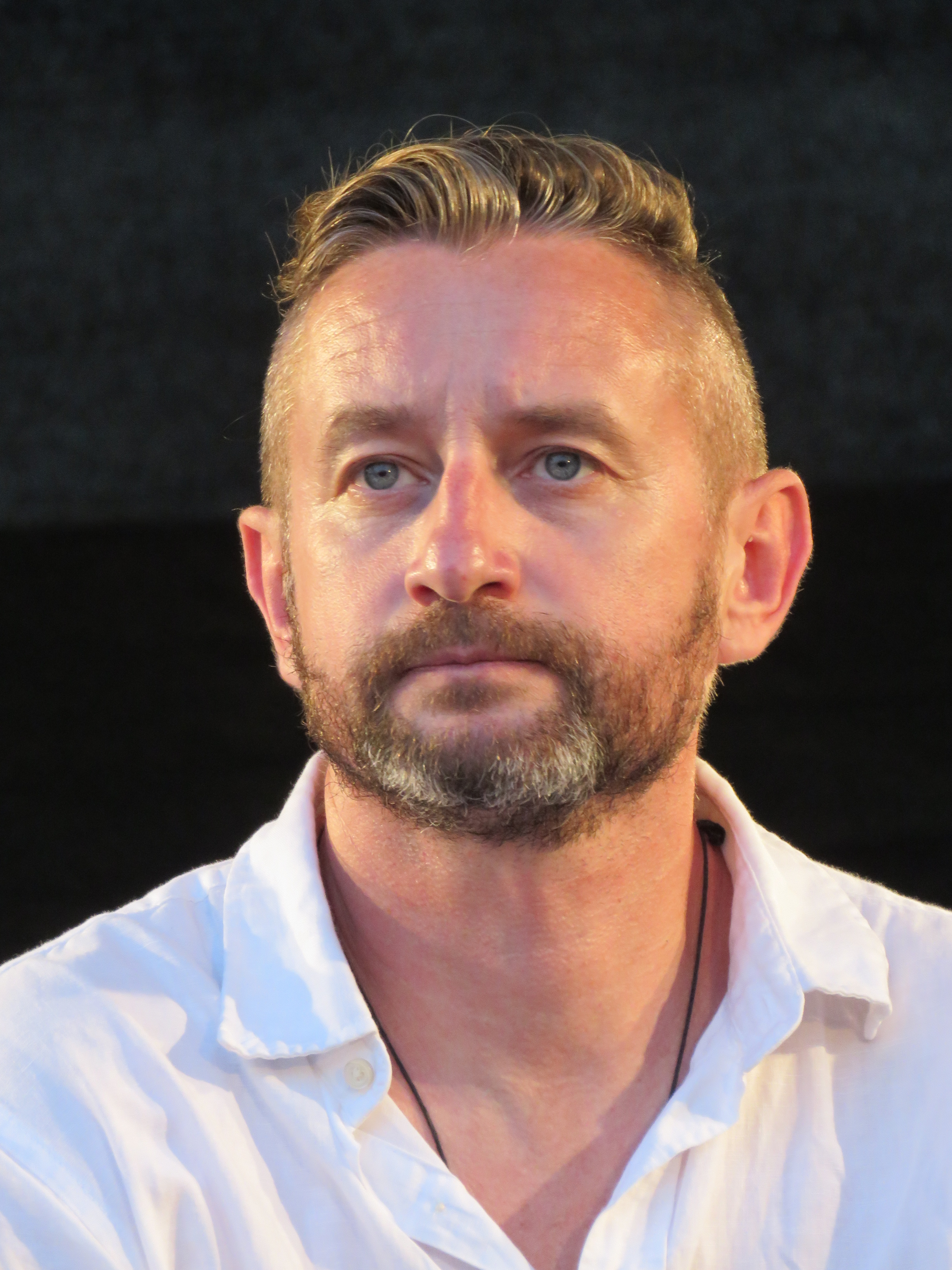
- Zhadan in 2022
- Born: 23 August 1974 (age 52); Starobilsk, Luhansk Oblast, Soviet Ukraine
- Education: H.S. Skovoroda Kharkiv National Pedagogical University
- Occupations: Poet; novelist; translator
- Musical career
- Genre: Ska
- Instrument: Vocals
- Years active: 2008–present
- Member of: Zhadan i Sobaky

Serhiy Viktorovych Zhadan (Ukrainian: Сергій Вікторович Жадан, Ukrainian pronunciation: [serˈɦii̯ ˈʋiktɔrɔwɪt͡ʃ ʒɐˈdan]; born 23 August 1974) is a Ukrainian poet, novelist, musician, translator, and social activist. He has been a member of the ska band Zhadan i Sobaky since 2008.

In early June 2024, Zhadan posted on his Facebook page that he had joined the 13th "Khartia" Brigade of the National Guard of Ukraine, which has been in active combat.

== Life and career ==
=== Early life and studies ===
Zhadan was born in Starobilsk, Luhansk Oblast, in Ukraine. He graduated from H.S. Skovoroda Kharkiv National Pedagogical University in 1996 with a thesis on the work of Mykhaylo Semenko and Ukrainian futurist writers of the 1920s. He then spent three years as a graduate student of philology and taught Ukrainian and world literature from 2000 to 2004. Since then, he has worked as a freelance writer.

=== Writing ===
He began writing in 1990, drawing upon his homeland, such as the industrial landscapes of eastern Ukraine, as in his 2010 novel Voroshilovgrad. Based on the book, Yaroslav Lodygin wrote and directed the 2018 film The Wild Fields.

Zhadan has published 12 books of poetry and 7 novels, and he has won more than a dozen literary awards. In 2008, the Russian translation of his novel Anarchy in the UKR made the shortlist of the National Bestseller Prize. It was also a contender for Book of the Year at the 2008 Moscow International Book Exhibition. In 2009, he won the Joseph Conrad-Korzeniowski Literary Prize. Voroshylovhrad won him the BBC Ukrainian Book of the Year award in 2010, the Jan Michalski Prize for Literature in Switzerland in 2014, the BBC Ukrainian Book of the Decade award in 2014, and the Brücke Berlin Prize. His 2014 book Mesopotamia won the Angelus Award in 2015, the Award of the President of Ukraine, and Ukrainian Book of the Year in 2016.

From 2016 to 2019, Zhadan was a member of the Taras Shevchenko National Award Committee of Ukraine.

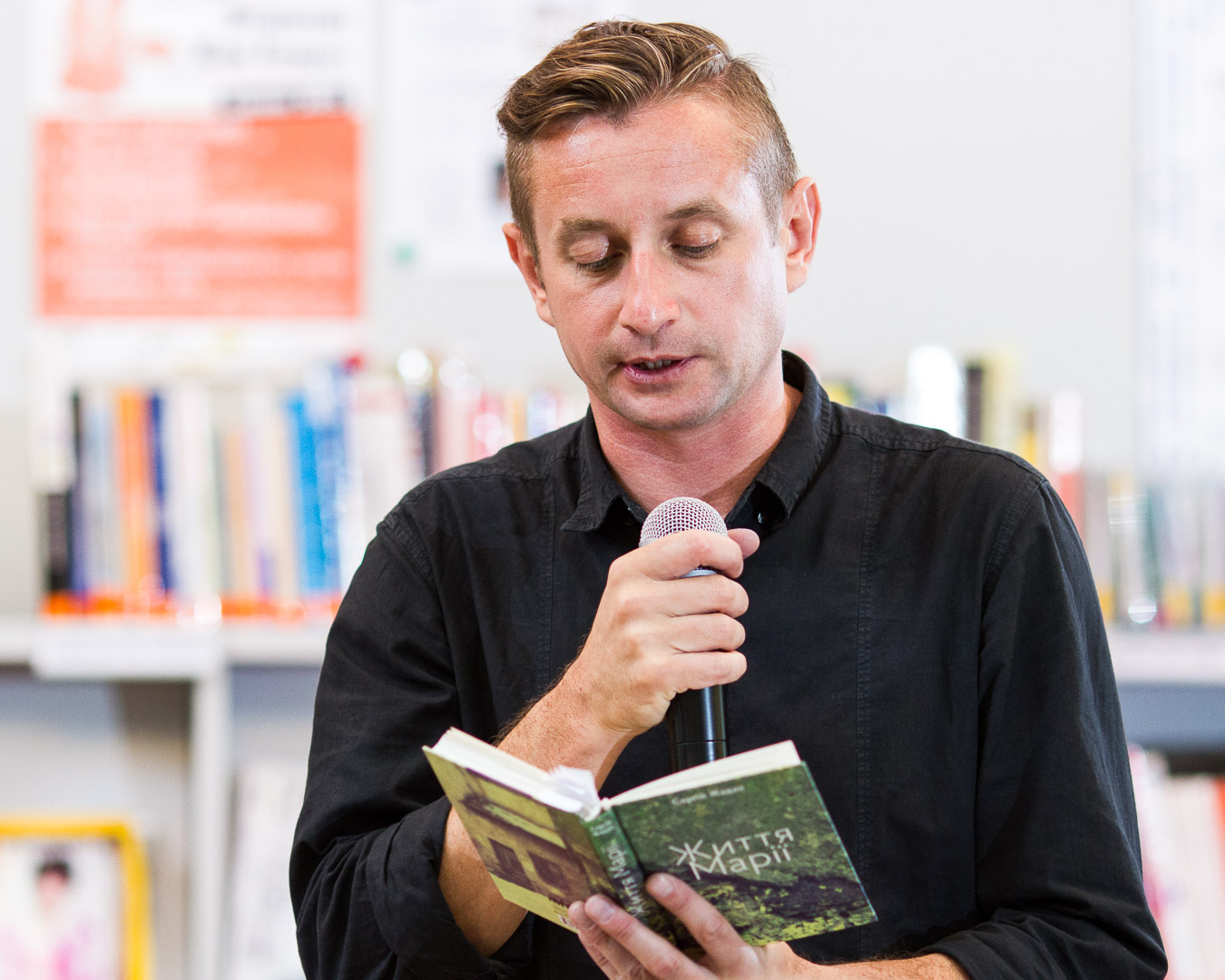
Zhadan in 2015

Zhadan has translated poetry from German, English, Belarusian, and Russian, from such poets as Paul Celan and Charles Bukowski. His own works have been translated into German, English, Dutch, Estonian, French, Italian, Swedish, Norwegian, Polish, Serbian, Croatian, Lithuanian, Latvian, Georgian, Belarusian, Russian, Hungarian, Armenian, and Czech.

His translated poetry has appeared in Ambit, Asymptote, Blackbird, Gulf Coast, The Manchester Review, Modern Poetry in Translation, Poetry International, Poetry International Web, Plume, The Threepenny Review, Tin House, and Virginia Quarterly Review.

In August 2024, Zhadan was featured reading a poem in a TV commercial for McDonald's in Ukraine.

=== Music ===
In 2008, Zhadan began collaborating with the band Sobaky v Kosmosi (Ukrainian: Собаки в космосі), who later changed their name to Zhadan i Sobaky (Ukrainian: Жадан і собаки). As of 2026, he has released five studio albums with them.

In 2021, recorded a full-length album titled Fokstroty with Yuriy Gurzhy, a Ukrainian-born, Berlin-based musician, DJ, and producer. In 2023, the duo followed it up with Skovorodance.

== Political activism and military service ==
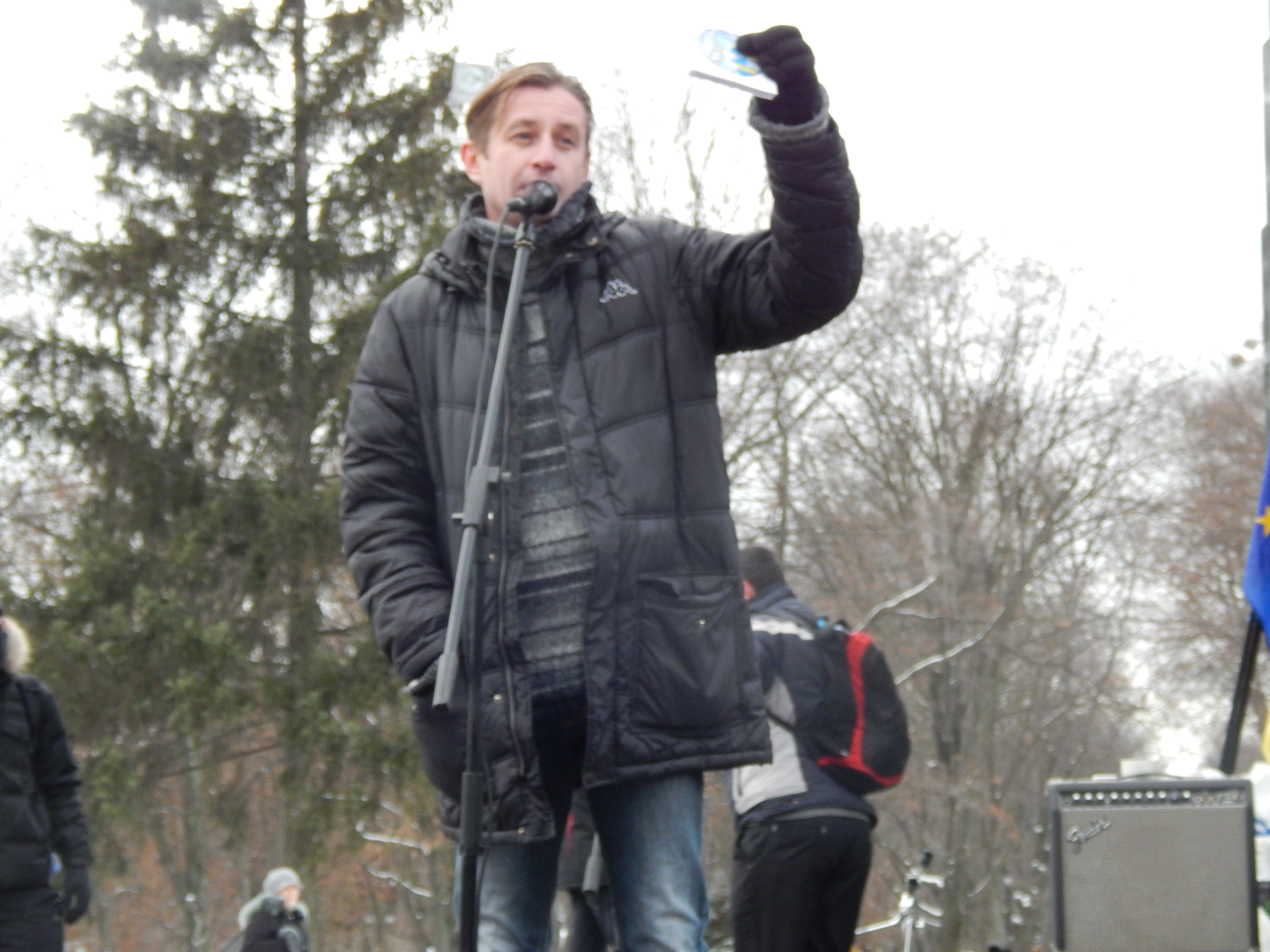
Serhiy Zhadan at the "Rock for Change" rally in Kharkiv, 2013

Zhadan's involvement in Ukrainian politics began while he was still a student. In 1992, he was one of the organizers of the Kharkiv-based neo-futuristic literary group "the Red Thistle". He participated in the 2004 Orange Revolution. He has repeatedly expressed sympathy for anarchists.

In 2013, he was a member of the coordination council of Euromaidan Kharkiv. In the aftermath of the 2014 Revolution of Dignity, he was assaulted by pro-Russian demonstrators outside the Kharkiv administration building.

When asked, Zhadan has described his political commitments in the following manner:

You're often described as 'left-wing'—is that accurate? I have never described myself as left-wing, but I'm always being told I belong among the left-wingers! It's all nonsense. Dividing people into left and right in modern Ukraine is not very constructive. I am a citizen of Ukraine who loves his country and tries to help.

Would you say you are a 'nationalist' or a 'patriot'? I'm not a nationalist. A patriot—yes. I'm a patriot and I love my country, my homeland. But the term 'patriot' in modern Ukraine and modern Europe has various connotations. I encounter this in Europe and America, where some members of the public equate 'patriot' and 'nationalist', or take a 'patriot' to be a conservative right-winger. But this is very inaccurate. In Ukraine, 'patriot' is a synonym for a person who is on the side of our soldiers on the frontlines—someone who supports our country.

Why wouldn't you call yourself a nationalist? Because I have known Ukraine's nationalist movement since the 1980s. I have a lot of friends in the nationalist movement, but the ideas of nationalism do not correspond to my vision of Ukraine. Ukraine is much more complicated and much less clear-cut.

After the 2022 Russian invasion of Ukraine, Zhadan remained in Kharkiv, helping to organize humanitarian aid. In June 2024, he posted on his Facebook page that he had joined the 13th Khartiia Brigade of the National Guard of Ukraine.

== Critical reception ==
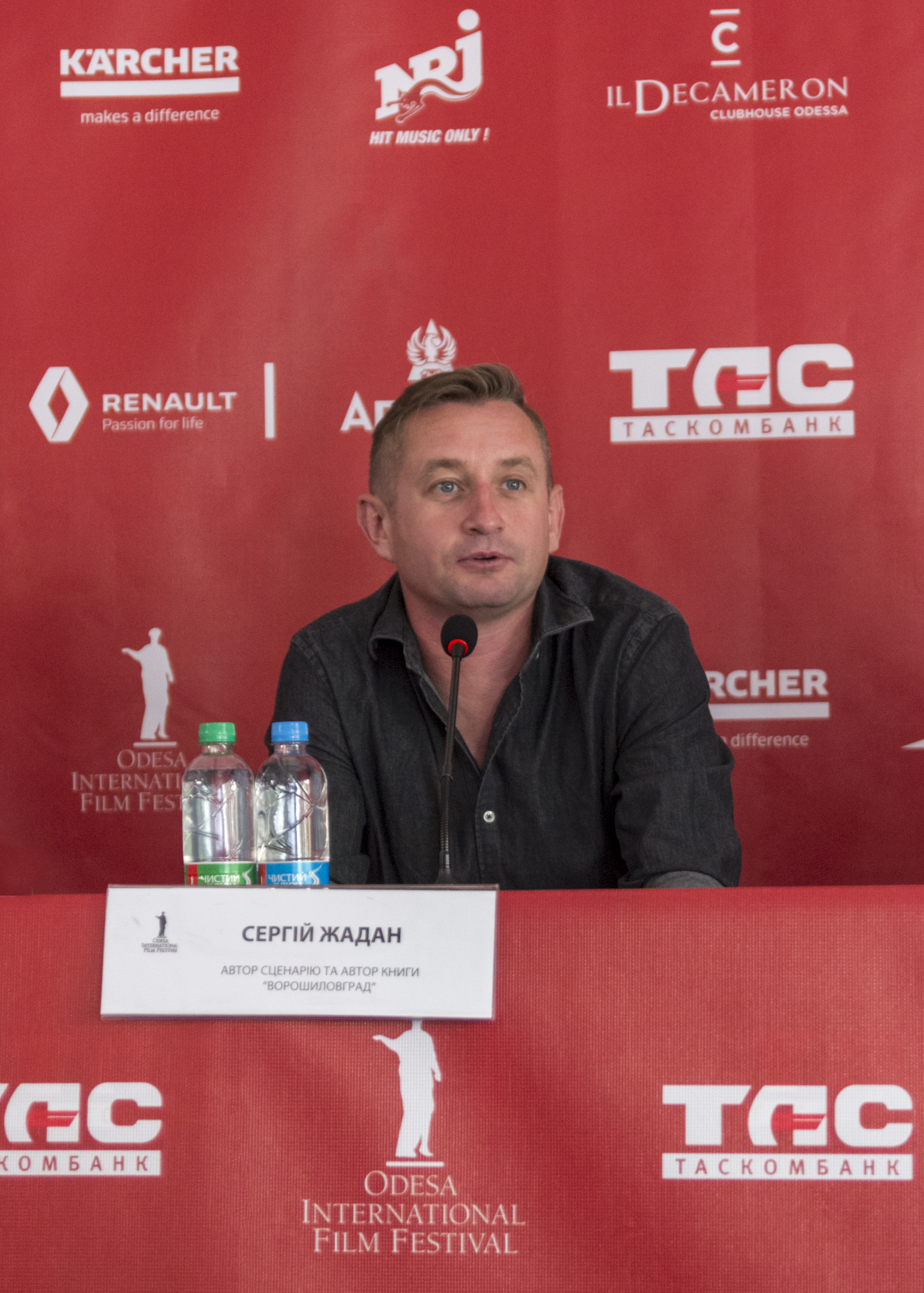
Zhadan at the 2017 Odesa International Film Festival

Rostislav Melnikov and Yuriy Tsaplin of the New Literary Review wrote in 2007:

Zhadan's prose is so poetic, his free verse so prosaic. It is difficult to assign a genre to his work: memoir, travelogue, timely or untimely meditation — or a mixture of all these, centered on the themes my generation and our epoch.

Kirill Ankudinov, writing for Vzglyad.ru in June 2008, said:

There is no summarizing the spicy, hot, sweet, vicious improvisations of Serhiy Zhadan — this is verbal jazz. When you read him, you fear for contemporary Russian literature: of those now writing in the Russian language, there is none among them who is so infernally free (and above all, free from "writerly" prose, from the tendency to "produce an impression").

In March 2022, the Polish Academy of Sciences nominated Zhadan for the Nobel Prize in Literature.

In July 2024, Zhadan received the title of honorary professor of philosophy from the Ukrainian Free University in Munich, Germany.

== Works ==
=== Poetry ===
- Quotations (Цитатник), (1995)
- General Judas (Генерал Юда), (1995)
- Pepsi (Пепсі), (1998)
- The Very Best Poems, Psychedelic Stories of Fighting and Other Bullshit: Selected Poems, 1992–2000 (Вибрані поезії), (2000)
- Ballads about War and Reconstruction (Балади про війну і відбудову), (2001)
- The History of Culture at the Beginning of This Century (Історія культури початку століття), (2003)
- UkSSR (У.Р.С.Р.), (2004)
- Maradona (Марадона), (2007)
- Ethiopia (Ефіопія), (2009)
- Lili Marlene (Лілі Марлен), (2009)
- Firearms and Knives (Вогнепальні й ножові), (2012)
- Life of Maria (Життя Марії), (2015)
- Templars (Тамплієри), (2016)
- Antenna (Aнтена), (2018)
- List of Ships (Список кораблів), (2019)
- Psalm to Aviation (Псалом авіації), (2021)
- What We Live for, What We Die For: Selected Poems (2019)
- How Fire Descends: New and Selected Poems (2023)

=== Prose ===
- Big Mac (Біґ Мак; short story collection), (2003)
- Depeche Mode (Депеш Мод), (2004); Glagoslav Publications Limited, (2013), ISBN 978-1-909156-84-5
- Anarchy in the UKR, (2005)
- Anthem of Democratic Youth (Гімн демократичної молоді), (2006)
- Big Mac² (Біґ Мак²; short story collection), (2007)
- Voroshilovgrad (Ворошиловград), (2010); Deep Vellum Publishing, (2016), ISBN 978-1-941920-30-5
- Big Mac and Other Stories (Біґ Мак та інші історії), (2011)
- Mesopotamia (Месопотамія; nine stories and thirty poems), (2014)
- The Orphanage (Інтернат), (2017)

=== Translated into English ===
- Arabesques: New Stories translated by Isaac Stackhouse Wheeler. (New Haven: Yale University Press, 2026)
- How Fire Descends: New and Selected Poems translated by Virlana Tkacz and Wanda Phipps. Foreword by Ilya Kaminsky, (New Haven: Yale University Press, 2023)
- Sky Above Kharkiv: Dispatches from the Ukrainian Front translated by Reilly Costigan-Humes. (New Haven: Yale University Press, 2023)
- The Orphanage, translated by Reilly Costigan‑Humes and Isaac Stackhouse Wheeler, (New Haven: Yale University Press, 2021) ISBN 978-0-300-24301-7
- A New Orthography: Poems, Sandpoint, Idaho: Lost Horse Press, 2020. ISBN 978-1-7333400-3-8
- What We Live for, What We Die For: Selected Poems translated by Virlana Tkacz and Wanda Phipps, (New Haven: Yale University Press, 2019). ISBN 978-0-300-22336-1
- Mesopotamia prose translated by Reilly Costigan-Humes & Isaac Stackhouse Wheeler; poetry translated by Viralna Tkacz and Wanda Phipps, (New Haven: Yale University Press, 2018). ISBN 978-0-300-22335-4
- Voroshilovgrad translated by Isaac Stackhouse Wheeler and Reilly Costigan-Humes, (Dallas: Deep Velum, 2016) ISBN 978-1-941920-30-5
- Depeche Mode translated by Miroslav Shkandrij (London: Glagoslav Publications, 2013). ISBN 978-1-909156-88-3

== Awards ==
- BBC Ukrainian Book of the Year award – Voroshylovhrad (2010)
- Jan Michalski Prize for Literature – Voroshylovhrad (2014)
- BBC Ukrainian Book of the Decade award – Voroshylovhrad (2014)
- Angelus Award – Mesopotamia, translated into Polish by Michał Petryk and Adam Pomorski (2015)
- EBRD Literature Prize – The Orphanage, translated into English by Reilly Costigan-Humes and Isaac Stackhouse Wheeler (2022)
- Friedenspreis des Deutschen Buchhandels (2022)
- Austrian State Prize for European Literature (2025)

== See also ==
- List of Ukrainian-language poets
- List of Ukrainian literature translated into English
