= Oleksandra Koval =

Ukrainian public figure and publisher (born 1957)

- Олександра Коваль
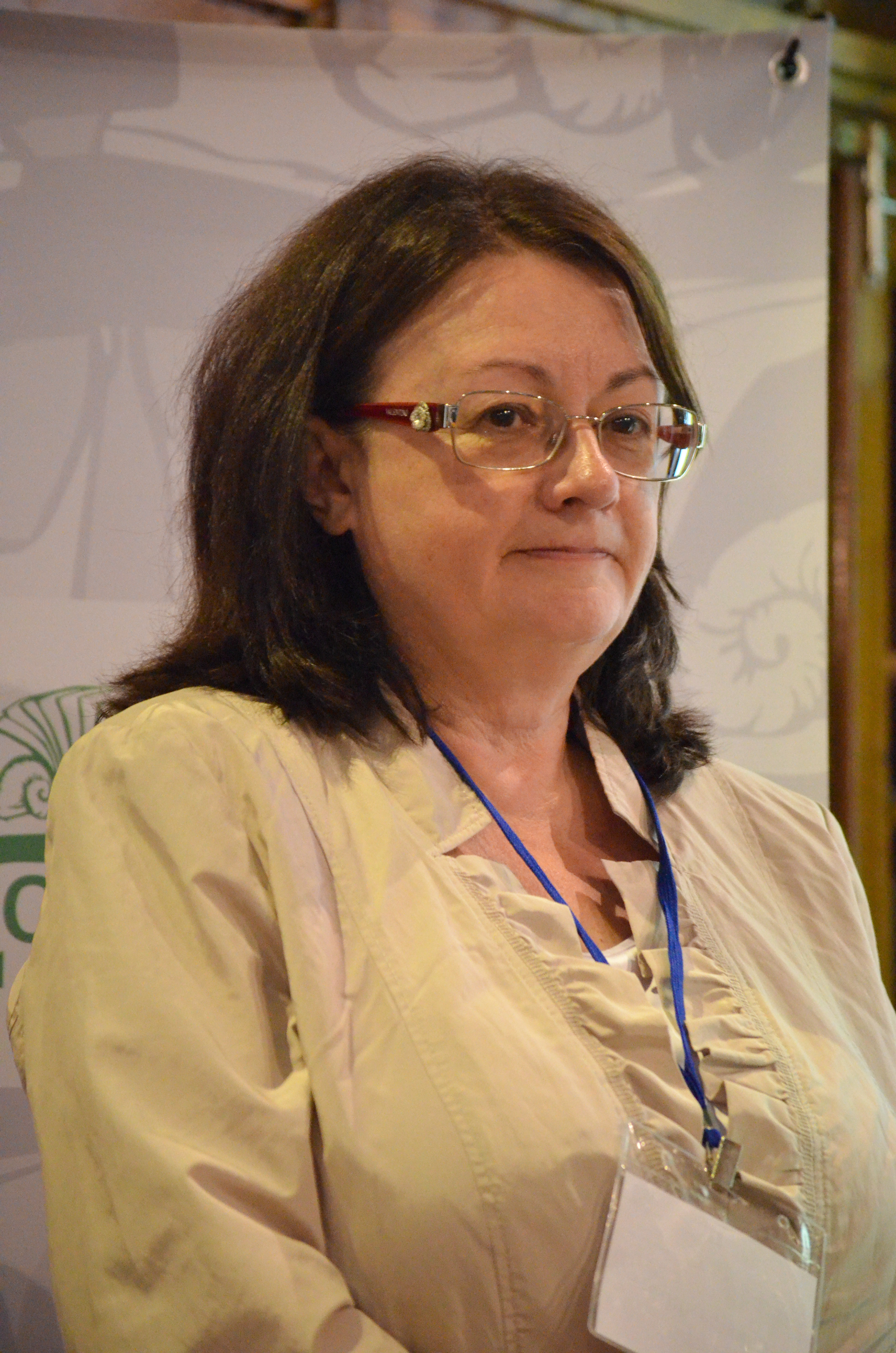
- Koval in 2014
- Born: Oleksandra Andriivna Koval; 20 October 1957 (age 68); Lviv, Ukrainian SSR, Soviet Union
- Education: Ukrainian National Forestry University
- Occupations: Public figure; publisher
- Organization: Co-founder of Aeros
- Known for: President of the Ukrainian Book Institute since 2018
- Awards: Vasyl Stus Prize
- Honours: Order of Princess Olga

Oleksandra Andriivna Koval (Ukrainian: Олександра Андріївна Коваль; born 20 October 1957) is a Ukrainian public figure and publisher who serve as the president of the Ukrainian Book Institute since 2018. She is also a member of PEN Ukraine.

== Early life and education ==
Koval was born on 20 October 1957 in Lviv. She graduated in 1979 from the Ukrainian National Forestry University with a degree in forestry.

== Career ==
From 1980 to 1989, Koval worked in a research department and was also a co-founder of the cooperative Aeros from 1986 to 1989, which specialised in developing aerostatics equipment for advertising and meteorological purposes. She served as deputy editor-in-chief of the Phoenix publishing house from 1990 to 1992, and then as director of the Taras Shevchenko Ukrainian Language Society Prosvita publishing house in Lviv from 1992 to 1997. Since 1995, she has headed the Lviv-based NGO Publishers' Forum. She also founded the Ukrainian Association of Publishers and Booksellers in 1995, and the Ukrainian Reading Association in 2010.

Koval has published several notable works, including Nervy lantsyuga (The Chain's Nerves: 25 Essays on Freedom, 2003), the Universal Dictionary-Encyclopaedia (1999), and the collected works of Vasyl Stus in six volumes (nine books, 1993–1996). She is also the creator and organiser of key literary and cultural events such as the Publishers' Forum for Children (since 1994), the Lviv International Children's Festival (since 2007), the Bookmania reading competition and festival (since 2002), the charity campaign Give a Child a Book! (since 2005), and the annual Book Forum Lviv (since 1994). Additionally, she has authored numerous publications on Ukrainian publishing.

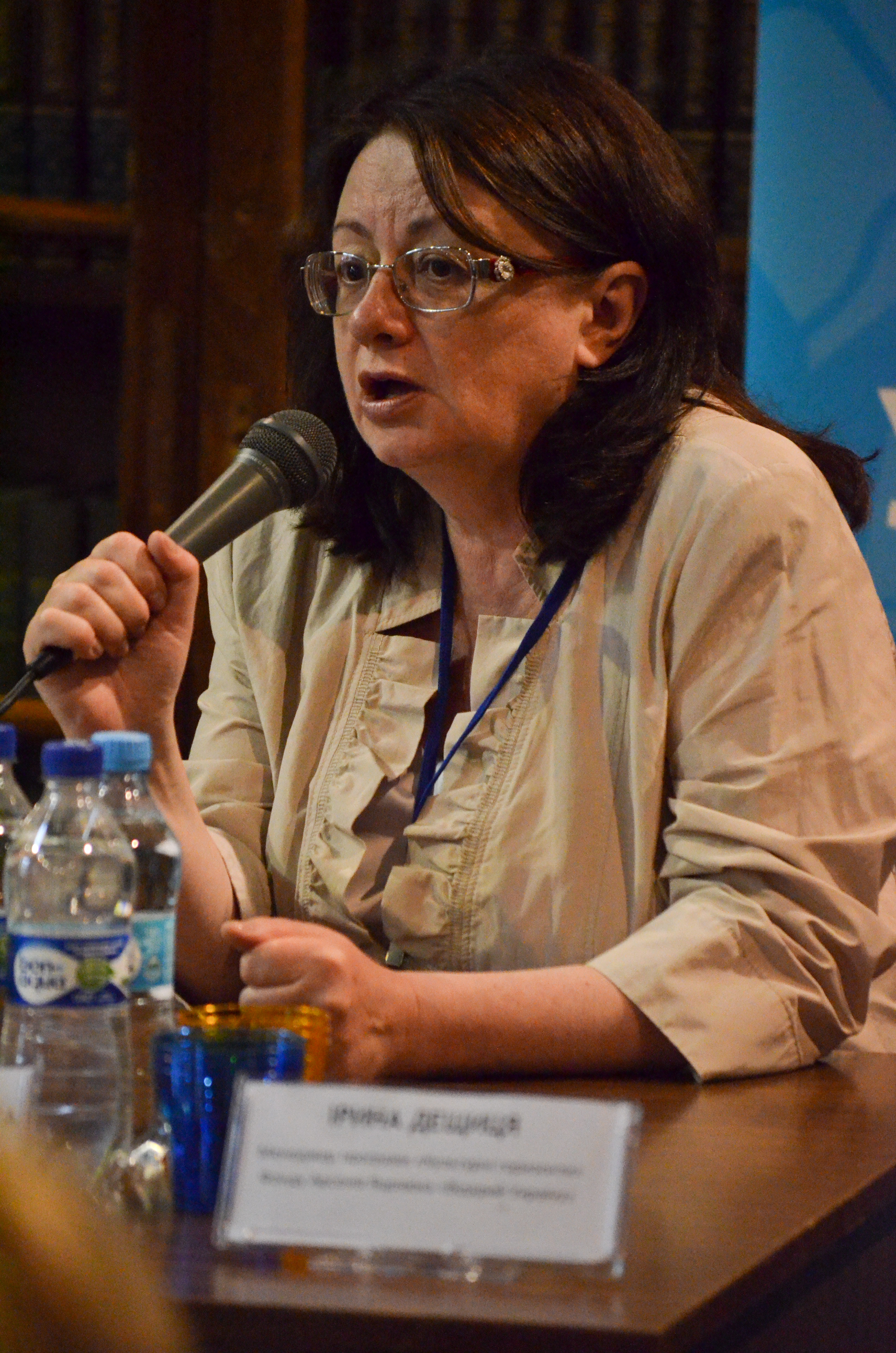
Koval in 2014

On 3 July 2013, Koval was appointed to the newly established Public Council on Publishing, representing her position as president of the public organisation Forum of Publishers. Later, on 10 October 2018, she officially assumed the role of acting director of the Ukrainian Book Institute, following her appointment by the Ministry of Culture of Ukraine. She had secured the position through a competitive selection process held in July 2018, emerging as the successful candidate among six contenders chosen by an expert committee.

== Political positions ==
=== 2018 FIFA World Cup boycott ===
Koval was one of the signatories of an international appeal urging world leaders to boycott the 2018 FIFA World Cup in Russia. The appeal condemned Russia's ongoing human rights abuses, including the imprisonment of Ukrainian political prisoners such as filmmaker Oleh Sentsov. Koval joined dozens of prominent writers, activists, and intellectuals in calling for solidarity with the prisoners and pressuring Russia to release them.

=== Ukrainian publishing ===
Koval advocates for cultural independence from Russia and strong state support for Ukrainian publishing. As director of the Ukrainian Book Institute, she has promoted local book production, supported reading initiatives, and helped expand Ukraine's presence at international book fairs. In 2023, she highlighted the growth of Ukrainian publishing and the rise in translated works. She also backed a national reading strategy and announced a major state programme to provide free books to adults in 2024, reinforcing her commitment to national identity through literature.

== Awards and honours ==
On 7 May 2009, during the final stage of the 3rd Forum of Publishers – Children festival, Koval was awarded the honorary medal "Great Friend of Little Readers" in recognition of her contributions.

- Vasyl Stus Prize (2016)
- Third Class of the Order of Princess Olga (9 November 2018)
