= To My Fellow Countrymen... =

1845 Ukrainian poem by Taras Shevchenko

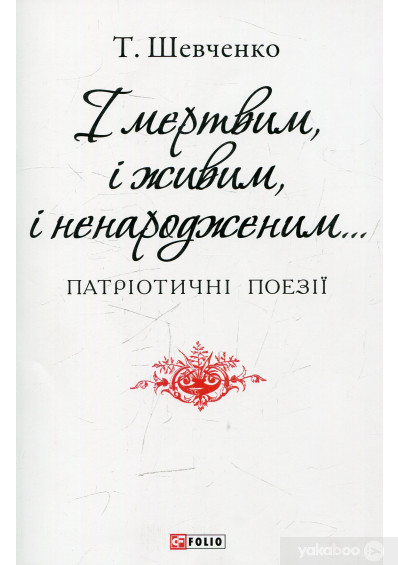
Cover of the poem's modern edition

To my fellow-countrymen, in Ukraine and not in Ukraine, living, dead and as yet unborn my friendly epistle (Ukrainian: І мертвим, і живим, і ненародженим замлякам моїм в Украйні і не в Украйні моє дружнєє посланіє) is an 1845 poem by Ukrainian author Taras Shevchenko, included into his poetry book Three Summers (Ukrainian: Три літа). It was first printed in 1859 in Leipzig. In the poem Shevchenko acts as a prophet who sees his role in proclaiming the truth to his own compatriots.

== Content ==
The poem starts with an epigraph from 1st John 4:20 declaring brotherly love to be the prerequisite of faith in God. The poem has numerous Biblical parallels, including images from the books of Jeremiah, Ezekiel and John's Revelation. The text condemns those noble Ukrainians who prided themselves with their knowledge of foreign scientific literature and proclaimed themselves to be Slavophiles, but at the same time didn't engage in the development of common Ukrainian people and their culture. Shevchenko harshly criticizes the Ukrainian elite's Cossack ancestors, proclaiming them to be "Toadies, slaves, the filth of Moscow, Warsaw’s garbage..." for their wish to serve either Russian tsarism or the Polish nobility, but not their own people. The author warns his compatriots about the oncoming hour of judgement, when the enserfed common folk will rise up against oppression, and pleads for all of them, irrespective of their social status, to recognize themselves as brothers and embrace each other for the sake of their mother Ukraine.

== Legacy ==
The poem was read by Shevchenko during a literary meeting in Kyiv, which was organized by Vasyl Tarnovsky and attended among others by Mykola Kostomarov and Vasyl Bilozersky. The text produced a furore due to its strong criticism of Cossack hetmans and their policies.
