= The Orphanage (book) =

2017 novel by Sergiy Zhadan

The Orphanage (Ukrainian: Інтернат, romanized: Internat, lit. 'boarding school') is a 2017 Ukrainian novel by Serhiy Zhadan. First published by Meridian Czernowitz in Chernivtsi, it follows a schoolteacher who traverses the warzone of the War in Donbas to bring his nephew home from a nearby orphanage. An English translation by Reilly Costigan-Humes and Isaac Stackhouse Wheeler was published by Yale University Press in 2021. The English translation won the EBRD Literature Prize in 2022.

== Reception ==
Publishers Weekly gave it a starred review and later included it in its list of the 20 best fiction books of 2021. Writing in Slavic Review, Tanya Zaharchenko described Internat as a "synchronous war novel". In Asymptote, Kate Tsurkan argued that the book's apparently apocalyptic atmosphere was grounded in the lived reality of the war in eastern Ukraine.

== Awards ==
- The English translation won the EBRD Literature Prize in 2022.
- The Polish translation, by Michał Petryk, was a finalist for the Angelus Central European Literature Award in 2020.
- The German translation, by Sabine Stöhr and Jurij Durkot, won the Leipzig Book Fair Prize for translation in 2018.

== Synopsis ==
The novel centres on Pasha, a thirty-five-year-old Ukrainian teacher who travels through a combat zone to retrieve his nephew Sasha. The journey out and back takes him through shelled streets, checkpoints, stranded civilians and shifting lines of control.
