= Geo Shkurupiy =

Ukrainian writer (1903-1937)

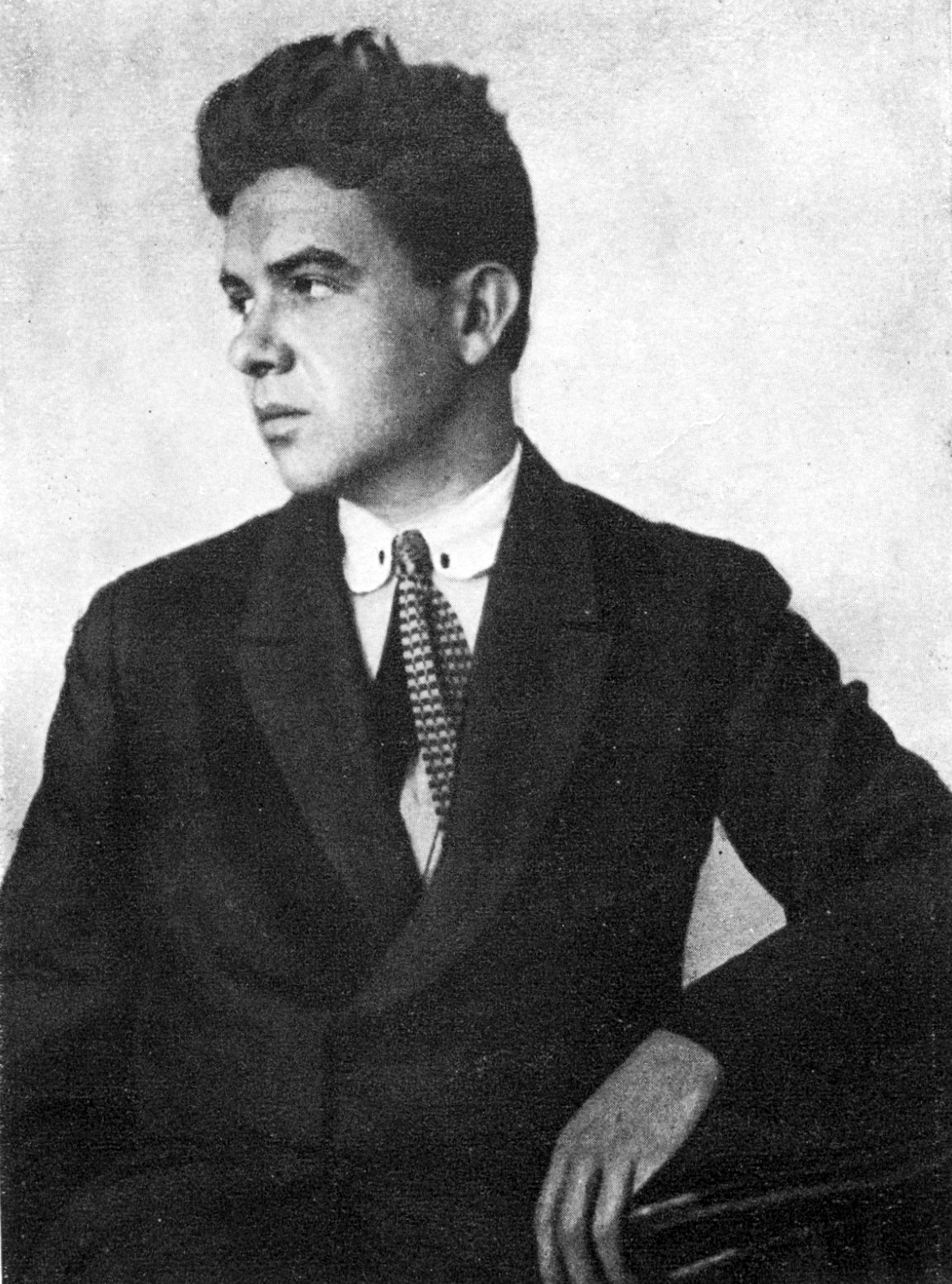

Geo Shkurupiy (Heorhii (Yurii) Danylovych; 20 April 1903, Tiahynia (Bender), Bessarabia – 8 December 1937, Leningrad) was a Ukrainian writer, screenwriter, and journalist. He was a representative of Panfuturism, "The King of Futurist Prairies". Shkurupiy was one of the prominent figures of the Executed Renaissance, a generation of Ukrainian intellectuals imprisoned and executed during the Soviet purges of the 1930s.

== Biography ==
He was born into a family of a railway worker and a teacher and spent his childhood in Podillia. In 1920 he graduated from a Kyiv Classical Gymnasium and published his first work in the Hrono almanac. He enrolled at the medical faculty of Kyiv University, where he studied there only for one year. Later, he attended the Kyiv Institute of Foreign Relations. His career included working as a railway worker, editor, screenwriter at a film studio, and as a staff member at a newspaper.

The writer was arrested in Kyiv on 3 December 1934, accused of belonging to the "Kyiv terrorist OUN" (Organisation of Ukrainian Nationalists). During two military tribunal hearings, Shkurupiy denied the charges and filed a complaint against unlawful investigative methods. On 27 April 1935, he was sentenced to 10 years in a labour camp on the Solovki Islands. His wife, Varvara Bazas, and their son were exiled from Kyiv as the family of an "enemy of the people". Shkurupiy was executed on 8 December 1937, and posthumously rehabilitated in 1957.

== Literary development ==
Shkurupiy's collections of poetry include:

- Psykhotezy (Psychotheses, 1922). Oleh S. Ilnytzkyj defined the collection as "distinguished by eroticism, narcissism, neologisms, Dadaist elements, and typographic experiments".
- Baraban (The Drum, 1923),
- Zharyny Sliv (The Embers of Words, 1925),
- More (The Sea, 1927), and
- Dlia Druziv Poetiv—Suchasnykiv Vichnosty (To My Friends the Poets, Contemporaries of Eternity, 1929).

His novellas and novels include:

- Dveri v Den (The Door to the Day, 1929),
- Zhanna Batalionerka (Zhanna the Battalion Member, 1930), and
- Mis Andriiena (Miss Andriena, 1934).

Shkurupiy's short stories include: 'Peremozhets drakona' (The Slayer of the Dragon, 1925), 'Pryhody mashynista Khorpa' (The Adventures of Khorp the Machinist, 1925), 'Shtab smerty' (Death Staff, 1926), 'Sichneve povstannia' (The January Uprising, 1928), 'Zruinovanyi polon' (Ruined Captivity, 1930), 'Strashna myt' (A Terrible Moment, 1930); and a collection of short stories, entitled Monhol's'ki Opovidannia (Mongolian Stories, 1930).

== Interesting facts ==
A contemporary Ukrainian composers and singers, Artem Pyvovarov and Klavdia Petrivna composed a song based on Geo Shkurupiy's poem "Baraban". Under thе sound of the song "Baraban", Ukrainian boxer Oleksandr Usyk made his entrance at a press conference with Tyson Fury on May 16, 2024, ahead of their fight.

== Bibliography ==
- Shkurupiy, Geo. "The Provocateur" (pp. 101–111) in Before the Storm: Soviet Ukrainian Fiction of the 1920s, 1986. ISBN 9780882335216
