= Natan Rybak =

Soviet writer

Natan Samiilovych Rybak (Ukrainian: Натан Самійлович Рибак; 3 January 1913 – 11 September 1978) was a Ukrainian and Soviet poet and writer of Jewish origin. Rybak published 3 collections of poetry in the 1930s. He published around 20 collections of short stories mostly in the 1930s and 1940s. He is best known for his novels. He was awarded the Stalin Prize in 1950 for volume 1 of the novel Pereiaslavs’ka rada. The novel Pomylka Onore de Bal’zaka was filmed in 1969.

== Bibliography ==
The bibliography is a selection from Encyclopedia of Ukraine.

- Harmaty zherlamy na skhid (1934) (in English Cannons with Muzzles Facing East)
- Kyïv (1936)
- Dnipro (2 volumes, 1937–8)
- Pomylka Onore de Bal’zaka (1940) (in English The Mistake of Honoré de Balzac filmed in 1969)
- Zbroia z namy (1943) (in English The Weapons Are with Us)
- Pereiaslavs’ka rada (volume 1 in 1948, was awarded the Stalin Prize in 1950 and volume 2 in 1953) (in English The Pereiaslav Council)
- Trilogien Chas spodivan’ i zvershen’ (1960) (in English A Time of Expectations and Achievements)
- Soldaty bez mundyriv (1966) (in English Soldiers without Uniforms)
- Collections of his works was published in 5 volumes in 1963–4 og 1981.
