= Voroshilovgrad (novel) =

2010 novel by Serhiy Zhadan

- Author: Serhiy Zhadan
- Original title: Ukrainian: Ворошиловград
- Translator: Reilly Costigan-Humes and Isaac Wheeler
- Language: Ukrainian
- Published: 2010
- Publisher: Folio
- Awards: Jan Michalski Prize for Literature
- ISBN: 978-966-03-5245-2

Voroshilovgrad (Ukrainian: «Ворошиловград», romanized: Voroshylovhrad) is a novel by Ukrainian author and social activist Serhiy Zhadan, published in 2010. In 2016, it was translated from Ukrainian into English by Reilly Costigan-Humes and Isaac Wheeler. The Wild Fields, a film based on the novel, was released in 2018.

Voroshilovgrad won the BBC Ukrainian Book of the Year award in 2010, its Book of the Decade award in 2014, and the Jan Michalski Prize for Literature in Switzerland in 2014. The novel has been translated at least into nine languages.

== Background ==
Voroshylovhrad is a city located in Donbas in eastern Ukraine known as Luhansk after the Soviet Union dissolved. English translators from Russia used historical Russian transliteration of the city's name (with i for и and g for г) when initially translated. In an effort to break the colonial tradition of writing names using Russian phonetics, guidelines from the Ukrainian government (with y for и and h for г) translate the title to "Voroshylovhrad". Both spellings are still used.

Donbas is an industrial region known for its steppe land and coal mining located along the Russian border. Under Stalin, Donbas became the setting for the Stakhanovite movement. In May 2014, when Voroshylovhrad was controlled by the self-declared Luhansk People’s Republic, Zhadan wrote the unrecognised state "exists exclusively in the fantasies of the self-proclaimed 'people's mayors' and 'people's governors.'"

== Plot ==
Herman, a young political expert working in Kharkiv, returns home to his home town to manage his brother's gas station after his disappearance. Herman works with Kocha and Injured, his brother’s faithful employees. They protect the gas station from a local, powerful businessman, Pastushok. Driven by nostalgia and combatting unfairness, Herman stays in Voroshilovgrad, distancing himself from his previous life towards an unknown future. The novel covers themes of making peace with the past and former friendships. It concurrently illustrates the legacy of Soviet administration on the Donbas region and the uncertain fate of its people.

== Reception ==
The novel garnered positive attention from magazines like Publishers Weekly, The New Yorker, and Los Angeles Review of Books. It was awarded the Book of the Year award in 2010 and later the Book of the Decade award in 2014 from BBC Ukrainian. The Jan Michalski Prize for Literature in Switzerland was given to Voroshilovgrad in 2014. It was featured on World Literature Today's Recommended Summer Reads in 2016.
