= Nova Generatsiia =

Ukrainian magazine

- Editor: Mykhailo Semenko
- Frequency: monthly
- First issue: October 1927
- Final issue: December 1930
- Language: Ukrainian

Nova Generatsiia (Ukrainian: Нова ґенерація), meaning "New Generation" in English, was a Ukrainian futurist magazine. The magazine was edited by Mykhailo Semenko (uk) and was published between October 1927 and December 1930 in Kharkiv. The magazine was the official organ of a group of Ukrainian futurists also led by Semenko who took their name from the magazine and believed that the end of bourgeois art and a period of destruction were necessary to bring about an age of synthesis and the creation of an altogether new and revolutionary form of art.

== Content ==
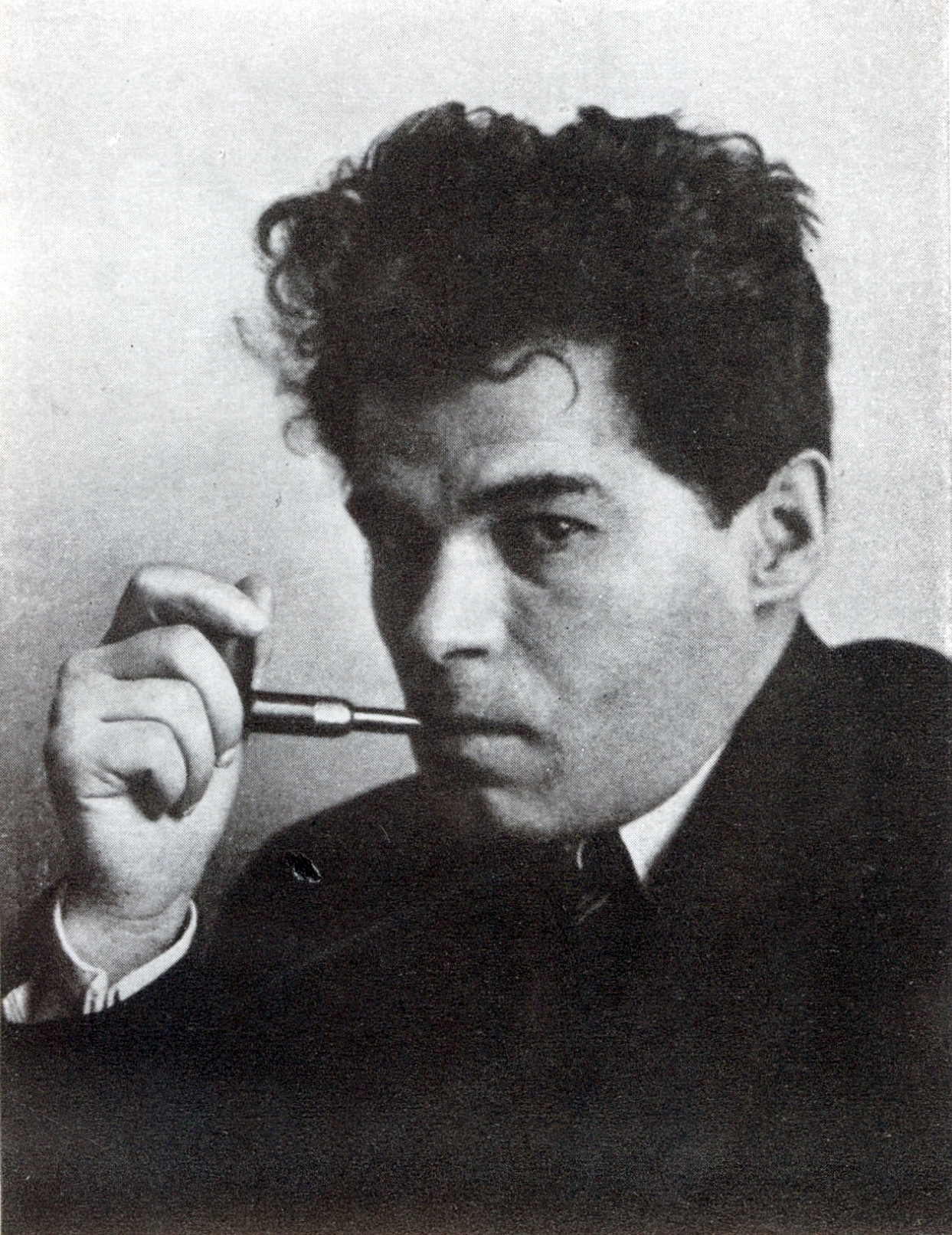
Mykhailo Semenko, founder of Ukrainian Futurism and editor of Nova Generatsiia

The goal of Nova Generatsiia was to promote avant-garde art to the general public of Ukraine. Although Nova Generatsiia was mostly an outlet for the literary works of the futurists (the majority works featured were poetry or prose), the magazine also placed a special emphasis on architecture, design, and city planning, following European and especially German developments in these areas very closely.

== Reactions ==
Ukrainian Futurism in general and Nova Generatsiia in particular were often criticized for their leftist politics, which were very clear in the magazine. The magazine was especially maligned by contemporaries, but was later recognized for its role in establishing Ukrainian art as an independent and modern institution. Additionally, the magazine has been praised for being the last in Ukraine to give in to the demands of the Communist Party when it sought to neuter and homogenize art and cultural activities in the latter half of the 1920s.
