= Natalena Koroleva =

Carmen-Alfonsa-Fernanda-Estrella-Natalena Koroleva (3 March 1888 – 1 July 1966) was a Ukrainian writer.

The daughter of Count Adrian Yurii Dunin-Borkovsky, of Polish descent, and Maria Clara de Castro Lacerda, from an aristocratic Spanish family, she was born Carmen-Alfonsa-Fernanda-Estrella-Natalena Dunin-Borkowska in San Pedro de Cardeña near Burgos, Spain. Her mother died while giving birth to her. Koroleva grew up in Spain, Ukraine, France and Italy. She was educated at the Convent of Notre Dame de Sion in France, the Kyiv Institute for Noble Maidens and the Archeological Institute in Saint Petersburg. She studied history, archaeology, philosophy, medicine and music theory and was fluent in a number of languages including French, Polish, Spanish, Arabic and Italian. Koroleva participated in archaeological expeditions to Pompeii, Alexandria, Armenia and Iran.

Her first work, written in French, was published in journals in Paris in 1909. She returned to Kyiv in 1914 because her father was ill. She served as a Red Cross nurse during World War I and was seriously wounded. In 1919, she moved to Czechoslovakia, where she worked as a translator for the Ukrainian diplomatic mission in Prague. In 1921, she published her first Ukrainian work, a short story, in the Ukrainian-language weekly Volia in Vienna. Her stories were published in various Ukrainian-language publications, especially Dzvony. She also translated works by other authors into Ukrainian.

Her first husband Iskander ibn Kurush was an Iranian serving in the Russian army who died in battle in 1915. Later, in Prague, she married Vasyl Koroliv-Stary, a Ukrainian writer and publisher; he died in 1941.

During her lifetime, she was criticized because her plots and characters were often abstract and did not reflect Ukrainian reality. Now, she is recognized for her unique contributions to Ukrainian literature.

She died in Mělník at the age of 78.

== Selected work ==
- Vo dni ony ("Once upon a Time"), stories (1935)
- 1913, novella (1935)
- Inakshyi svit ("A Different World"), stories (1936)
- Bez korinnia ("Without Roots"), autobiographical novella (1936)
- Son tini ("A Dream of a Shadow"), historical novel (1938)
- Legendy starokyïvs’ki ("Ancient Kyivan Legends"(, stories, 2 solumves (1942–3)
- Predok ("An Ancestor"), historical novella (1961)
- Quid est veritas, historical novella (1961)
- Bez korinnia, collected works (2007)
- Tvory ("Works"), collected works (2010)
