= The Wild Fields =

2018 Ukrainian film

- Ukrainian: Дике поле
- Directed by: Yaroslav Lodygin
- Screenplay by: Serhiy Zhadan; Natalia Vorozhbit; Yaroslav Lodigin
- Based on: Voroshylovhrad by Serhiy Zhadan
- Produced by: Volodymyr Yatsenko; Miklosh Himnesh
- Starring: Oleg Moskalenko; Vladimir Yamnenko; Oleksiy Gorbunov; Ruslan Khazipov; George Povolotsky; Eugene Muts; Igor Portyanko
- Cinematography: Serhiy Mykhalchuk
- Production companies: LIMELITE Production; Ukraine TV channel; Media Group Ukraine; Film Brut
- Release date: 9 November 2018 (Ukraine)
- Country: Ukraine
- Languages: Ukrainian; Russian
- Budget: 31 million ₴

The Wild Fields (Ukrainian: «Дике поле», romanized: Dyke pole, Russian: «Дикое поле», romanized: Dikoye polye) is a Ukrainian eastern film based on Serhiy Zhadan's 2010 novel, Voroshylovhrad. It was developed by LIMELITE Production, in collaboration with the Ukraine TV channel, Media Group Ukraine, the Ukrainian State Film Agency, and the Swiss production studio Film Brut. The film was released in Ukraine on 9 November 2018.

== Synopsis ==
Herman returns to his native Donbas after years spent away, in order to investigate his brother's sudden disappearance. He meets real and unreal characters, his childhood friends, and the local mafia. To his surprise, he decides to stay in his hometown with people who love and believe in him and need his protection.

== Cast ==
- Oleg Moskalenko as Herman
- Volodymyr Yamnenko as Kocha
- Oleksiy Gorbunov as Pastor
- Ruslana Khazipova as Olya
- George Povolotsky as Travma
- Eugenia Muts as Nikolai Nikolaevich

== Production ==
=== Pre-production ===
In February 2013, the Ukrainian director Yaroslav Lodygin announced that he, along with writer Serhiy Zhadan, had begun preparing a film adaptation of Zhadan's 2010 novel, Voroshilovgrad. Pre-production, including scriptwriting, fundraising, location sourcing, and casting, took six years, and filming began at the end of July 2017, on a budget of 1.1 million euros, 50% of which was provided by the Ukrainian State Film Agency.

=== Filming and post-production ===
Shooting began on 31 July 2017 in Starobilsk, Zhadan's hometown, where the novel's story takes place. After about a month, production moved to Kyiv. Filming wrapped up in 2018.

=== Language ===
Most of the film's characters speak a mixture of Ukrainian and Russian, called "surzhyk".

=== Soundtrack ===
Most of the musical themes in the film were written by the composer and pianist Fima Chupakhin.

== Release ==
The Wild Fields was released in November 2018.
