= Mykhail Semenko =

Ukrainian writer and poet (1892–1937)

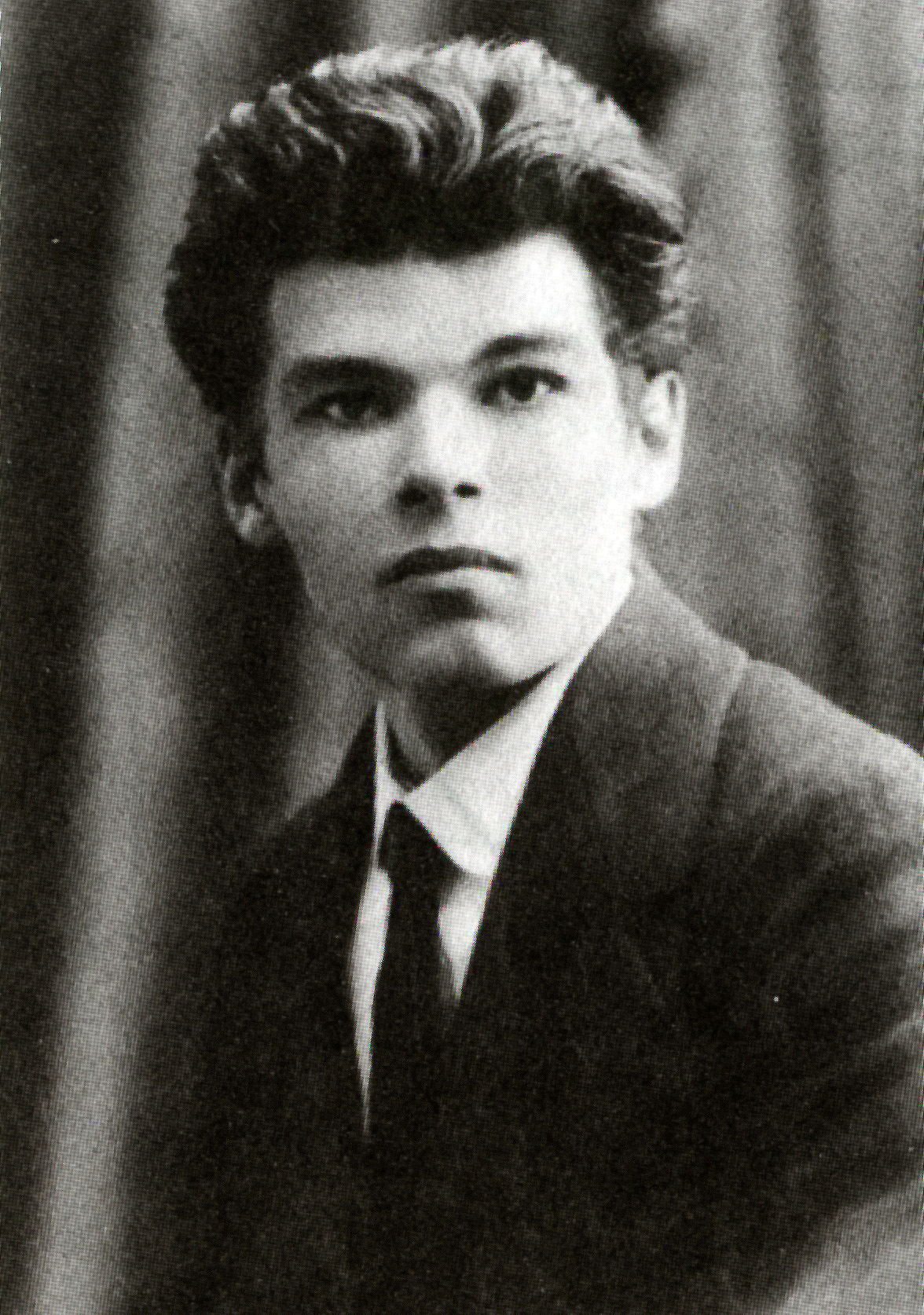
- Born: 31 December 1892; Kybyntsi, Russian Empire (today in Poltava Oblast, Ukraine)
- Died: 23 October 1937 (aged 44); Kyiv, Ukrainian SSR, Soviet Union
- Occupation: Poet
- Writing career
- Language: Ukrainian
- Literary movement: Futurism

Mykhail Semenko (Ukrainian: Миха́йль Семе́нко) or Mykhailo Vasyliovich Semenko (Миха́йло Васи́льович Семе́нко; 31 December 1892 – 23 October 1937) was a Ukrainian poet, and a prominent representative of the Ukrainian Futurist movement of the 1920s. He was a leading figure of the Executed Renaissance — a generation of Ukrainian poets, writers, and artists persecuted by the Soviet regime.

In his 1914 article Semenko criticized the cult of Ukrainian poet Taras Shevchenko and declared that he was burning his Kobzar. In 1924 he published his own collection of works titled after Shevchenko's most famous work.

Semenko founded the futurist groups Aspanfut, Komunkult, Nova Generatsiya, and Kverofuturism, known to the English-speaking reader as Panfuturism. He edited a couple of almanacs and the journal Nova Generatsiya. As a poet Semenko was focused on the urbanistics.

Semenko was an active participant of the movement that sought to break with the official Soviet cultural policy at the onset of the 20th century. His dissident art led him to establish avant-garde groups in Kyiv and Kharkiv. He established these futurist groups as an alternative to Russian Cubo-Futurism. Along with several Ukrainian intellectuals, he was arrested in 1937, sentenced to death and shot in Kyiv on 23 October 1937. In the 1957 he was rehabilitated by the Communists themselves.

== Sources ==
- Юрій Лавріненко. Розстріляне відродження: Антологія 1917–1933. — Київ: Смолоскип, 2004. (in Ukrainian)
- Encyclopedia of Ukraine. Semenko, Mykhailo
- Méheut, Constant (4 December 2024). "Stalin Silenced These Ukrainian Writers. The War Made Them Famous Again". New York Times.
