= Panfuturism =

Ukrainian art movement developed by Mykhaylo Semenko

Panfuturism (also known as Kverofuturism) is a Ukrainian avant-garde art movement developed by Mykhaylo Semenko, a Ukrainian poet.

== Overview ==
=== History ===
Panfuturism originated in Ukraine. Mykhaylo Semenko developed it in 1914.

=== Principles ===
Semenko outlined the following principles of Panfuturism in an essay, "What Panfuturism wants":

- Panfuturism "wants to be a scientific system which is attained by its being a system universal and synthetic."
- The goal of Panfuturism is to "abolish all 'isms' which is attained by neutralizing them...by regarding every single case as a private problem of the polyproblematic organism of art."
- Panfuturism is a "proletarian system of art."
- Panfuturism is an "organizational art."
- Panfuturism "is the whole art."
- Panfuturism "is at once Futurism, Cubism, Expressionism and Dadaism."
