= Hryhorii Epik =

Ukrainian writer and journalist

Hryhorii Epik Григорій Данилович Епік
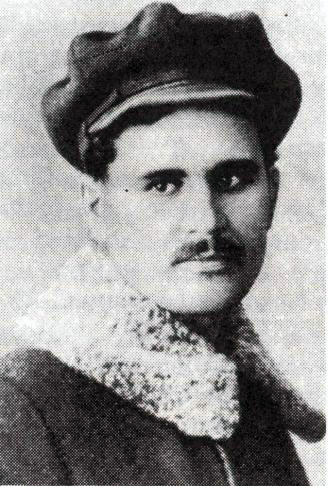
- Born: January 17, 1901; Kamianka, Yekaterinoslav Governorate, Russian Empire (now Dnipro, Ukraine)
- Died: November 3, 1937 (aged 36); Sandarmokh, Karelian ASSR, Russian SFSR, Soviet Union
- Occupations: Writer, journalist

Hryhorii Danylovych Epik (Ukrainian: Григорій Данилович Епік) (January 17, 1901 – November 3, 1937) was a Ukrainian writer and journalist. He supported the Soviet Ukrainization during the 1920s, which likely led to his arrest and execution during the Great Purge in the 1930s.

== Early life ==
After studies at a rural school in the big village of Kamianske, Yekaterinoslav Governorate (pop. ~20,000), he started to work at a railway workshop office. He was fired from his job in 1918 after he had taken part in the anti-Hetmanate uprising. In 1919, he joined the staff of the first volunteer Moscow regiment and took part in revolutionary events.

In early 1920, he joined the Communist Party and the Revolutionary committee in Kamianske. He later moved to Poltava, where he worked as a political instructor, secretary and chairman of the district executive committee. During the period of 1922–1924, Epik worked within the regional board of the Ukrainian branch of Komsomol and from 1924 to 1925, as an editor of Chervonyi Shliakh (Red Road) in Kharkiv.

Between 1925 and 1929, he studied in the department of Ukrainian history at the Kharkiv Institute of Red Professors. After graduating, he became the director of the Derzhlitvydav publishing house (State Publishing House).

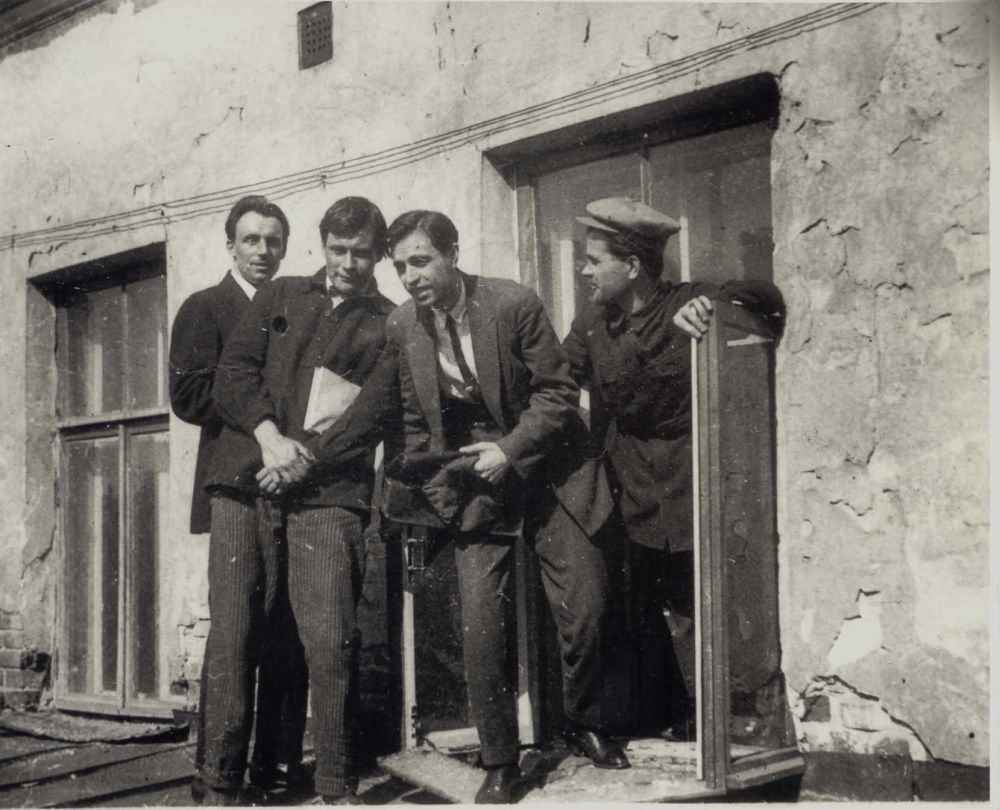
From left to right: Petro Panch, Maik Yohansen, Vasyl Vrazhlyvyi, and Hryhorii Epik. Kharkiv, 1926

Epik participated in the activities of cultural and educational societies, was a member of the Union of Peasant Writers "Plough", and later joined the VAPLITE group led by Mykola Khvyliovyi.

== Writings ==
Epik's writings started to appear in print in 1923. He was a member of several Ukrainian literary organizations such as the Plough, Prolitfront and VAPLITE (Free Academy of Proletarian Literature). These organizations gathered many young members of the Ukrainian intelligentsia, who in the 1930s suffered severely during the Great Purge.

In Epik's prose from the 1920s, he sharply criticized different aspects of the Soviet regime, particularly in Bez gruntu (1928), in which he harshly branded the conformists, whom he called "paperoids", who have developed a system of their existence: complete submission to the strong and merciless bullying of the weak. The novel "Autumn" shows the type of communist-regenerate who rules with impunity in a housing cooperative. In the novel "First Spring" (1931), Epic managed to truthfully show the desperate resistance of the peasantry to violent collectivization.

His last novels from the 1930s, however, were written in the Stalinist spirit. In 1932, he published the pro-Komsomol novel "Petro Romain", where he praised the growth of the Soviet technical intelligentsia.

During the late 1920s, Epik also was a screenwriter for the growing Ukrainian film industry.

== Repression and death ==
Even though Epik had continued to support the Communist Party, after the abrupt reversal of the Soviet Ukrainization policy in the early 1930s, he suffered from the purges. He was arrested on 5 December 1934, accused of being a Ukrainian nationalist and a member of a secret terrorist organization.

In contrast to those arrested in Kharkiv at the same time, such as Mykola Kulish, who for a long time denied the trumped-up charges, Epik admitted without resistance that he belonged to a mythical terrorist organization, which allegedly included Kulish, Klym Polishchuk, Valerian Pidmohylnyi, Yevhen Pluzhnyk, and Vasyl Vrazlivyi.

At the beginning of 1935, many writers were shocked by Epik's letter addressed to People's Commissar Vsevolod Balytskyi, in which the writer repented for the supposed criminal intentions of the entire group and stated that they should all be shot "like rabid dogs." This letter was read by the secretary of the Central Committee of the Communist Party of Ukraine Pavel Postyshev at the plenum of the board of the Union of Writers of Ukraine.

In early 1935, he was sentenced to ten years of forced labour and sent to the Solovki prison camp in the White Sea. While on Solovki, he continued to write and even sent one of his works, Solovki stories, to the NKVD in Moscow. He was, afterwards, discouraged and stopped writing, burning short stories and a novel he had written "in honor of Cheka".

Epik was one of the "lost transport" of prisoners shipped back to the mainland in 1937 from Solovki. It is now known that he was shot on 3 November 1937 at the killing field and burial ground called Sandarmokh near Medvezhyegorsk, in Karelia (then the Karelian ASSR), a site discovered in 1997 by the Memorial Society and its local head Yury Dmitriev.

Together with Epik, 289 other members of the Ukrainian intelligentsia—such as Mykola Kulish, Valerian Pidmohylnyi, Yulian Shpol, Valerian Polishuk, Les Kurbas, Myroslav Irchan, and Mykola Zerov—were shot at Sandarmokh.

Epik was posthumously rehabilitated in 1956 by the Military Collegium of the Supreme Court of the USSR.

== Bibliography ==
=== Short stories ===
- 1926 – Na zlomi (At the Break Point)
- 1928 – V snihakh (Amid the Snows)
- 1929 – Obloha (The Siege)
- 1930 – Tom satyry (A Volume of Satire)

=== Novels ===
- 1928 – Bez gruntu (Without Ground)
- 1929 – Zustrich (The meeting)
- 1930 – Nepiia (NEPia)
- 1931 – Persha vesna (The First Spring)
- 1932 – Petro Romen
