= Maik Yohansen =

Ukrainian poet and author (1896–1937)

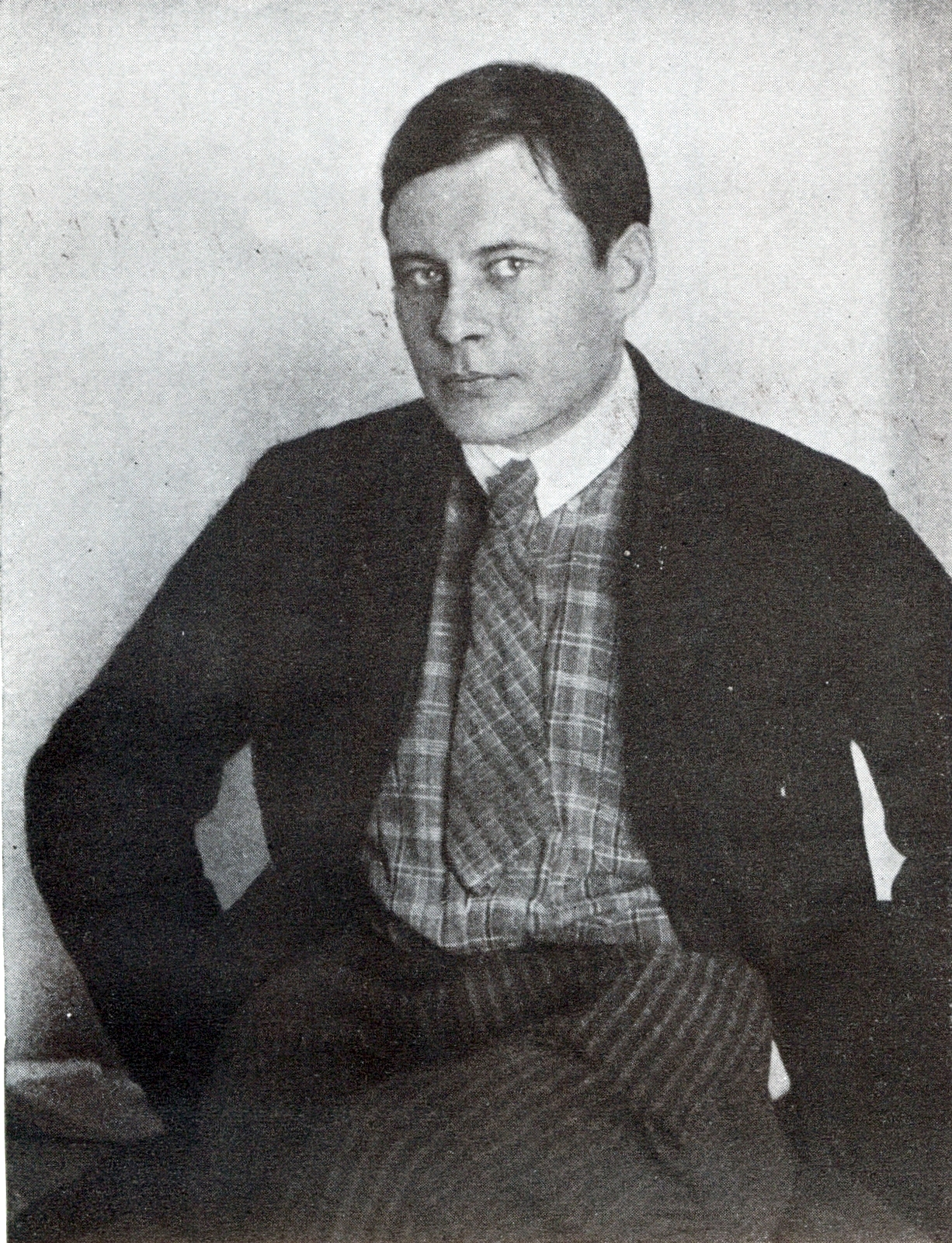
Yohansen in 1928

Maik (Mykhailo) Hervasiiovych Yohansen or Mike Johansen (Ukrainian: Майк Гервасійович Йогансен; pseudonyms Villi Vetselius [Willy Wetzelius] and M. Kramar; 16 October 1895 – 27 October 1937) was a Ukrainian poet, prose writer, dramatist, translator, critic and linguist. He was one of the founders of VAPLITE.

== Biography ==
Maik Yohansen was born on 16 October 1895 in Kharkiv. His father, a Latvian emigrant, was a teacher of German, and made sure his son had a proper education. Maik Yohansen received his secondary education at the Kharkiv Third Gymnasium. There he studied along with Hryhoriy Petnikov and Bohdan Hordeev (pseudo: Bozhydar), who later became well-known poet-futurists, as well as with Yuriy Platonov, a geographer and prose writer. Afterwards, Maik Yohansen studied at the Kharkiv University, which he successfully graduated in 1917, specialising in Latin. At Kharkiv University Maik Yohansen's linguistics lecturers included Leonid Bulakhovskyi and Oleksa Syniavskyi.

Later, Maik Yohansen mentioned the name of Oleksa Syniavskyi in his famous novel Doctor Leonardo's Travels through the Switzerland of Slobidska Ukraine (‘Podorozh doktora Leonardo po Slobozhans’kii Shvaitsariï’, 1928):

That same evening Don Jose Pereira booked train tickets for himself and Rodolfo. The next morning, he was lucky to find at Barcelona market Syniavsky's Grammar. He did not part with it until he reached the steppes. He enjoyed the sounds of the Ukrainian language great deal.

Maik Yohansen also collaborated with the following well-known Ukrainians: Mykola Khvyliovyi, Ostap Vyshnia, Yuriy Tiutiunnyk and Volodymyr Sosiura.

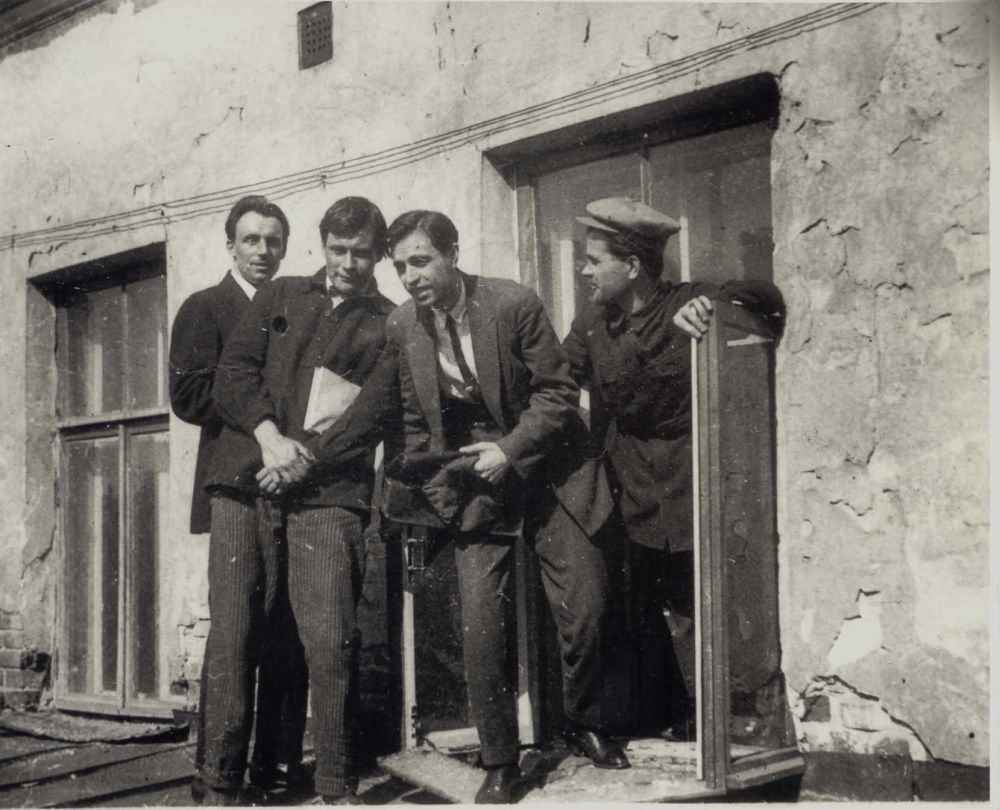
From left to right: Petro Punch, Maik Yohansen, Vasyl Vrazhlyvyi, Hryhoriy Epik. Kharkiv, 1926

In 1925 Maik Yohannsen with a group of his colleagues founded VAPLITE. The same year, whom king VAPLITE was forced to dissolve, in January 1928, Maik Yohansen founded Techno-Artistic Group A, which was officially banned in 1930. In 1934 Maik Yohannsen joined the Soviet Writers’ Union of Ukraine.

On 18 August 1937 the NKVD commissars seized Maik Yohansen from his apartment. During his interrogations Yohansen did not hide his political views. Among other things, he accused the Soviet government in targeted persecution of Ukrainian writers and other members of Ukrainian intelligentsia.

Maik Yohansen was accused in belonging to a fictitious ‘Ukrainian bourgeois-nationalist terrorist organisation'. The Military Collegium of the Supreme Court of the Soviet Union condemned him to death by firing squad.

The sentence was carried out on 27 October 1937 in the NKVD prison, Kyiv. The writer’s symbolic grave is located at Lukianivka Cemetery.

== Literary works ==
At the outset of his literary career Maik Yohansen wrote (especially poetry) mostly in German and Russian. However, since 1919 he began writing only in Ukrainian, having witnessed the brutality of Russian raids in Kharkiv.

=== Poetry ===
Depending on the period of the author’s writing career, critics define Maik Yohansen’s poetry as following: romantic, social-national and experimental – To the Peak (‘D'hori’, 1921), Revolution (Revoliutsiia’, 1923), The Dancing Circle (‘Krokoveie kolo, 1923), Prologue to the Commune (‘Proloh do komuny’, 1924), and Works Thus Far (‘Dorobok”, 1924); sophisticated – The Ash Tree (‘Yasen’, 1930); and social-realist – Ballads about War and Reconstruction (‘Baliady pro viinu i vidbudovu’, 1933).

=== Prose ===
As for Maik Yohansen's prose, his works are characterised as masterful and "excellent modern", avant-garde, experimental, “sophisticated literary mystifications” and “modernist transformation”. His most well-known experimental novel is Doctor Leonardo's Travels through the Switzerland of Slobidska Ukraine (‘Podorozh doktora Leonardo po Slobozhans’kii Shvaitsariï’, 1928).

1925 – 17 Minutes (‘17 khvylyn’), short story collection

1925 – The Adventures of MacLayston, Harry Rupert, and Others (‘Pryhody Mak-Leistona, Harri Ruperta ta inshykh’), novel

1928 – Dr. Leonardo’s Journey to Sloboda Switzerland with his Future Lover, the Beautiful Alcesta (‘Podorozh doktora Leonardo po Slobozhans’kii Shvaitsariï’), experimental novel

1931 – The Life of Hai Serhiievych Shaiba (‘Zhyttia Haia Serhiievycha Shaiby’), short story collection

1931 – Stories about Michael Parker (‘Opovidannia pro Maikla Parkera’), short story collection

1932 – The Journey of a Man Wearing a Cap (‘Podorozh liudyny pid kepom’), travel sketch

1933 – A Trip to Dagestan (‘Podorozh u Dagestan’), travel sketch

1936 – Kos-Chagil on the Emba River (‘Kos-Chahyl na Embi’), travel sketch

=== Translations ===
Maik Yohansen knew ancient Greek, Latin, German, French and English. He also had a good knowledge of Scandinavian and a number of Slavic languages. His translations include works of Friedrich Schiller, William Shakespeare, Edgar Allan Poe and others.

=== Screenplays ===
Maik Yohansen authored several scripts for theatrical productions. On several occasions he collaborated with famous Les Kurbas and his Berezil theatre. Some of his most notable works include a Ukrainian adaptation of Gilbert and Sullivan's Mikado and:

1927 – screenplay for Oleksander Dovzhenko's silent film Zvenyhora. The film is considered to be a landmark of Ukrainian cinema. Maik Yohansen co-wrote the screenplay with Yuriy Tiutiunnyk.

1929 – adaptation of Hello on Frequency 477 (‘Allo na khvyli 477’), (in collaboration with Mykola Khvyliovyi and Ostap Vyshnia)

=== Non-Fiction ===
Maik Yohansen participated in some major projects on Ukrainian language. He took part in creation of the standardardised Ukrainian orthography, which was officially adopted in 1928 and worked on the Latinisation of Ukrainian. He wrote studies on compiling dictionaries and on phonetics, such as on literary and dialectal Ukrainian pronunciation, particularly in Shyshaky and Myrhorod regions.

1922 – Elementary Rules of Versification (‘Elementarni zakony versyfikatsiï’)

1926 – How to Construct a Short Story (‘Iak buduvaty opovidannia’)

1926 – Russian-Ukrainian Dictionary (in collaboration with Mykola Nakonechnyi, Kostiantyn Nimchynov, and Borys Tkachenko)

1929 – Russian-Ukrainian Dictionary of Folk Sayings (in collaboration with H. Mlodzinskyi)

== See also ==
- List of Ukrainian-language writers
- List of Ukrainian literature translated into English

== Bibliography ==
- Maik Yohansen. The Journey of the Learned Doctor Leonardo and his Future Lover, the Beautiful Alceste, to the Switzerland of Slobozhanshchyna. 2021. ISBN 9780648948520
