= Klym Polishchuk =

Ukrainian journalist, poet and writer

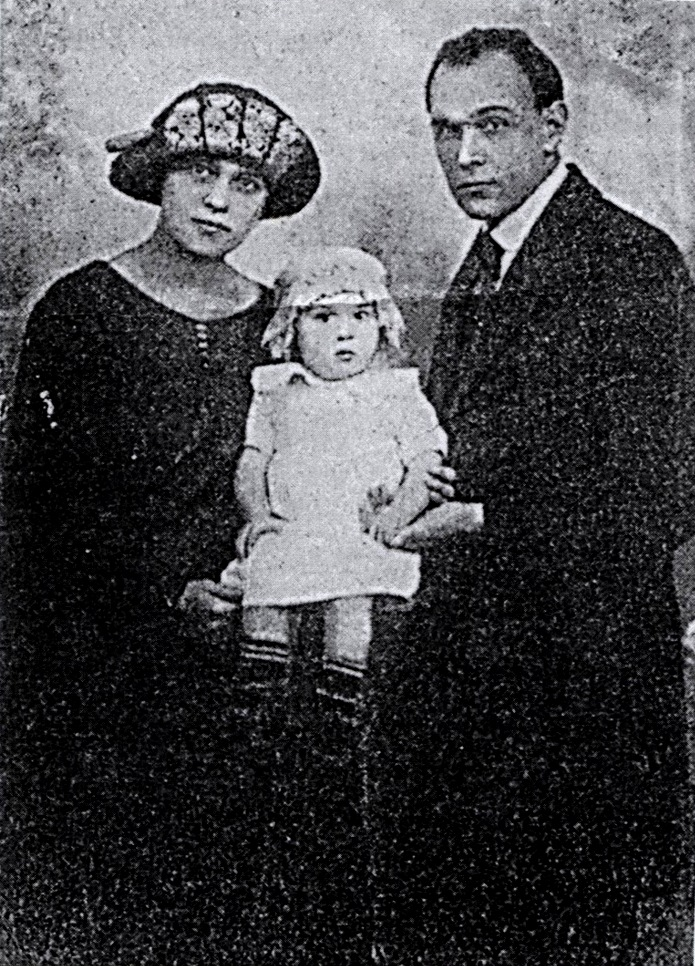
Klym Polishchuk with his wife Halyna Mnevska and daughter Lesia

Klym Lavrynovych (Lavrentiiovych) Polishchuk (Ukrainian: Клим Лавринович/Лаврентійович Поліщук, 25 November 1891, Krasnopil, Zhytomyr region, Ukraine – 3 November 1937, Sandarmokh, Russia) was a Ukrainian journalist, poet and writer.

== Biography ==
Klym Polishchuk was born into a peasant family. As a child he was home-schooled, along with his brother Fedir and sister Nastia, by their father. At a young age Klym was forced to work as a hired worker. In addition to being interested in literature, Klym Polishchuk was a skilled artist. In 1909, with the support of the Hromada benevolent organisation and a few individuals, Klym Polishchuk enrolled at the Art Drawing College, Art Academy, St Petersburg, Russia. In 1912, due to a lack of funds, Polishchuk withdrew from the college and returned to Zhytomyr.

In August 1914 Klym Polishchuk was arrested for "separatism" activities and exiled to Russia. In 1916 he was deployed to fight in World War I.

In 1920 Klym Polishchuk moved to Lviv, where in 1921 married an upcoming writer, Halyna Mnevska (Halyna Orlivna, pseudonym). The following year their daughter Lesia was born. Klym Polishchuk and Halyna Mnevska divorced in 1927.

On 4 November 1929, following the falsified charges, Klym Polishchuk was accused of 'bourgeois nationalism' and sentenced to exile and 10 years of hard labour in concentration camps.

Klym Polishchuk's last place of imprisonment, along with 289 other representatives of Ukrainian intelligentsia (including, Mykola Zerov, Hryhorii Epik, Marko Voronyi, Mykola Kulish, Valerian Pidmohylnyi, Yulian Shpol, Valerian Polishchuk, Les Kurbas, and Myroslav Irchan), was the Solovki island prison in the White Sea. He was executed at the peak of the Great Purge in Sandarmokh, Karelia, Russia, on 3 November 1937.

== Literary career ==
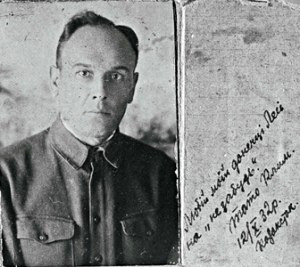
Klym Polishchuk

Klym Polishchuk's literary career began with poetry. At the age of fifteen his poem Watching God's World (Dyvliachys na Myr Bozhyi) was published in the Volyn newspaper (1906). Soon after that his first short story appeared in Dzvinok magazine.

In 1914 Klym Polishchuk's first book, Faraway Stars (Daleki Zori), was published.

In 1919, in Kyiv, Klym Polishchuk joined other Ukrainian authors such as Pavlo Tychyna, Yakiv Savchenko, Les Kurbas, Pavlo Phylypovych, Dmytro Zahul, Oleksa Slisarenko, Mykhailo Ivchenko and Mykhailo Zhuk in establishing Muzahet, a literature and art group that focused on the characteristics of Ukrainian national literature. In 1920 Muzahet was banned and most of its members were later sentenced and executed.

Thematically, Klym Polishchuk's prose works are divided into two major groups. The first group consists of works incorporating Ukrainian folklore and legends, including Handful of Earth: Halychyna Legends and Treasure of the Ages: Ukrainian Legends. The second group is composed of historical stories and novels, featuring revolutionary (October Socialist Revolution) and war (World War I) events, such as Red Mirage: Essays and Short Stories of the Revolution Period and Otaman Zelenyi.

Klym Polishchuk's literary style is often characterised by artful application of symbolism and gothic elements.

=== Major works ===
- 1921 – Handful of Earth: Halychyna Legends (‘Zhmenia zemli: Halytski lehendy’)
- 1921 – Red Mirage: Essays and Short Stories of the Revolution Period (‘Chervone marevo: narysy i opovidannia z chasiv revoliutsiyi’)
- 1921 – Treasure of the Ages: Ukrainian Legends (‘Skarby vikiv: Ukrainski Lehendy’)
- 1921 – Voyenko
- 1921 – Zvukolirnist (‘Zvukolirnist’)
- 1921[?] – Folk Tale of the Palace (Kazka palatsu)
- 1922 – A Crucified Soul (Rozpyata dusha)
- 1923 – Huliaypole Father (Huliaypilskyi batko)
- 1923 – Otaman Zelenyi (Otaman Zelenyi)
- 1929 – Polissya Sounds (Poliski Shumy) (Manuscript was never published due to the author's arrest).

=== Works translated into English ===
Polishchuk, K 2015, Treasure of the Ages: Ukrainian Legends [Skarby vikiv: Ukrainski Lehendy], trans. S Chornomorets, Sova Books, Sydney, original work published 1921
