= Nadezhdovka, Kursk Oblast =

Rural locality in Kursk Oblast, Russia

Nadezhdovka Надеждовка
- Village
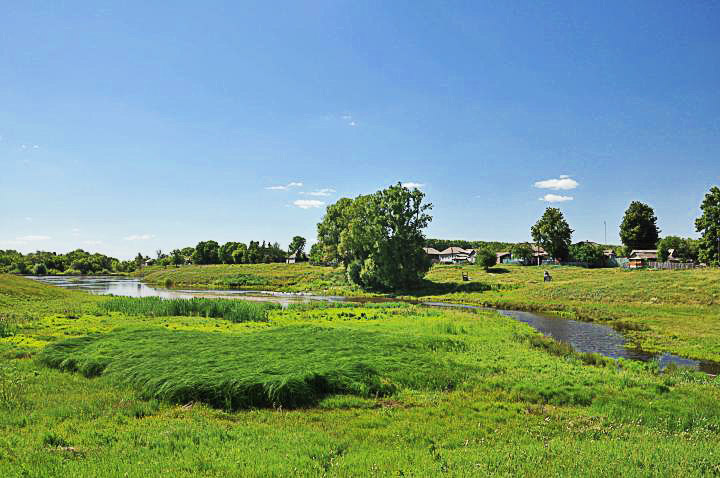
- Interactive map of Nadezhdovka
- Location of Nadezhdovka Nadezhdovka (Kursk Oblast)
- Coordinates: 51°34′12″N 35°02′23″E
- Country: Russia
- Federal subject: Kursk Oblast
- Administrative district: Lgovsky District
- SelsovietSelsoviet: Gustomoysky

Population (2010 Census)
  - Total: 68
  - Estimate (2010): 68 (0%)

Municipal status
  - Municipal district: Lgovsky Municipal District
  - Rural settlement: Gustomoysky Selsoviet Rural Settlement
- Time zone: UTC+3 (MSK)
- Postal code: 307712
- Dialing code: +7 47140
- OKTMO ID: 38622424171
- Website: gustomoy.rkursk.ru

Nadezhdovka (Russian: Надеждовка) is a rural locality (Russian: деревня, lit. 'village') in Gustomoysky Selsoviet Rural Settlement, Lgovsky District, Kursk Oblast, Russia. Population: 68 (2010 census); 134 (2002 census);

== Geography ==
The village is located in the Seym River basin, 38 km from the Russia–Ukraine border, 81 km south-west of Kursk, 17 km south-west of the district center – the town Lgov, 6.5 km from the selsoviet center – Gustomoy.

Climate

Nadezhdovka has a warm-summer humid continental climate (Dfb in the Köppen climate classification).

Climate data for Nadezhdovka
| Month | Jan | Feb | Mar | Apr | May | Jun | Jul | Aug | Sep | Oct | Nov | Dec | Year |
|---|---|---|---|---|---|---|---|---|---|---|---|---|---|
| Mean daily maximum °C (°F) | −3.6 (25.5) | −2.6 (27.3) | 3.4 (38.1) | 13.4 (56.1) | 19.6 (67.3) | 22.9 (73.2) | 25.3 (77.5) | 24.6 (76.3) | 18.4 (65.1) | 10.8 (51.4) | 3.7 (38.7) | −0.8 (30.6) | 11.3 (52.3) |
| Daily mean °C (°F) | −5.7 (21.7) | −5.2 (22.6) | −0.3 (31.5) | 8.5 (47.3) | 14.9 (58.8) | 18.5 (65.3) | 21 (70) | 20 (68) | 14.2 (57.6) | 7.5 (45.5) | 1.5 (34.7) | −2.8 (27.0) | 7.7 (45.8) |
| Mean daily minimum °C (°F) | −8.2 (17.2) | −8.3 (17.1) | −4.4 (24.1) | 3 (37) | 9.2 (48.6) | 13.1 (55.6) | 15.9 (60.6) | 14.9 (58.8) | 9.9 (49.8) | 4.1 (39.4) | −0.8 (30.6) | −5 (23) | 3.6 (38.5) |
| Average precipitation mm (inches) | 50 (2.0) | 44 (1.7) | 48 (1.9) | 50 (2.0) | 63 (2.5) | 70 (2.8) | 79 (3.1) | 52 (2.0) | 57 (2.2) | 56 (2.2) | 47 (1.9) | 48 (1.9) | 664 (26.2) |
Source: https://en.climate-data.org/asia/russian-federation/kursk-oblast/nadezhdovka-654288/

== Transport ==
Nadezhdovka is located 5 km from the road of regional importance 38K-017 (Kursk – Lgov – Rylsk – border with Ukraine) as part of the European route E38, 1 km from the road of intermunicipal significance 38H-112 (Ivanovskoye – Kolontayevka), on the road 38H-113 (38N-112 – Nadezhdovka), 6 km from the nearest railway halt Kolontayevka (railway line 322 km – Lgov I).

The rural locality is situated 88.5 km from Kursk Vostochny Airport, 148 km from Belgorod International Airport and 291 km from Voronezh Peter the Great Airport.
