= Yevhen Malaniuk =

Ukrainian poet

- Євген Филимонович Маланюк
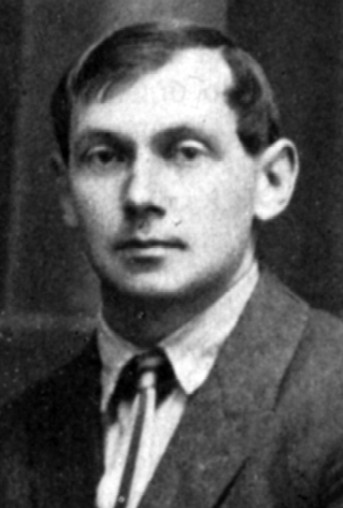
- Yevhen Malaniuk in 1924
- Born: 22 February 1897; Novoarkhanhelsk, Kherson Governorate, Russian Empire (now Ukraine)
- Died: 16 February 1968 (aged 71); New York City, United States
- Education: Ukrainian Husbandry Academy, Poděbrady (1923)
- Occupations: poet, publicist, literary critic, political activist
- Writing career
- Language: Ukrainian
- Period: 1922-1968
- Literary movement: Classicism, Symbolism, Baroque, Romanticism

Yevhen Fylymonovych Malaniuk (Ukrainian: Євген Филимонович Маланюк, Ukrainian pronunciation: [jeu̯ˈɦɛn fɪlɪˈmɔnowɪt͡ʃ mɐlɐˈnʲuk]; born 2 February (O.S. 20 January) 1897 - died 16 February 1968) was a Ukrainian poet, literary critic and community activist. His poetry belongs to the finest examples created by the 1920-1930s generation in Ukrainian literature. Malaniuk's works became influential in Ukrainian emigré circles, but were banned in Ukraine itself during the Soviet rule as a result of his nationalist views.

== Biography ==
Yevhen Fylymonovych Malaniuk was born on 20 January (2 February according to Gregorian calendar) 1897 in Novoarkhanhelsk, then a village in Olviopol County of Kherson Governorate, Russian Empire. His father was a peasant, but the family itself had Ukrainian Cossack origins. After finishing the gymnasium in Yelysavethrad in 1912, next year Malaniuk entered the St. Petersburg Polytechnic Institute, but his studies were interrupted by the outbreak of the First World War.

Mobilized into the army, in 1917 Malaniuk graduated from an officers' school in Kyiv and soon thereafter joined the military of the newly proclaimed Ukrainian People's Republic. After the defeat of Ukrainian forces in 1920 he was interned in Kalisz, Poland. There Malaniuk started his literary activities by becoming a co-founder and contributor of Veselka, a Ukrainian literary magazine. In 1922 he moved to Czechoslovakia to study at the Ukrainian Husbandry Academy, graduating next year. In 1929 Malaniuk returned to Poland, where he worked as an engineer in Warsaw and continued his career as a poet and publicist. During that time he became close to Dmytro Dontsov and contributed to his journal Vistnyk.

Towards the end of the Second World War he once again moved to Czechoslovakia, settling in Prague, but soon thereafter left for Regensburg in Germany, where he worked as a mathematics teacher at a Ukrainian gymnasium. In 1948 Malaniuk left Europe and emigrated to the United States, becoming an active participant of social and cultural life of Ukrainian emigration in that country. He died on 16 February 1968 in New York City.

== Literary style and ideas ==
The style and content of Malaniuk's poetry emerged as a reaction to the subjugation of Ukraine in the aftermath of its struggle for independence in 1917-1920. Main topics of his works are the fight for a national and social revival of Ukraine and its statehood, as well as frustration at the loss of political achievements of the revolutionary years as a result of Moscow's domination over the country. Ukraine in Malaniuk's works is romanticized through the image of "steppe Hellas".

Malaniuk's poetry is characterized by dynamism, frequent use of words with shock value, pathos, prophecy and reflections on the past. He most frequently used regular strophes with classical meter and rhyme schemes and was inventive in the use of visual imagery.

Malaniuk's anger visible in his poetry and publicism was directed not only against Ukraine's external enemies, but also at the internal weaknesses which he perceived to be present in his compatriots. He was especially critical of the so-called "Little Russian mentality", as well as anarchism, lack of discipline and organization, and anti-intellectualism.

== As a literary critic and translator ==
Malaniuk dedicated many of his articles to the study of Ukrainian literature. His analysis covered the works of prominent Ukrainian authors including Taras Shevchenko, Ivan Franko, Lesia Ukrainka, Panteleimon Kulish, Mykola Bazhan, Mykola Khvylyovy, Oleksandr Oles, Dmytro Dontsov, Yurii Lypa, Oleh Olzhych and others. He also created articles on the topic of Russian literature, analyzing the writings of Nikolai Gogol, Ivan Bunin, Anna Akhmatova, Mikhail Zoshchenko and other authors.

Malaniuk is also known for translating into Ukrainian several works of Josef Svatopluk Machar and Charles Baudelaire.

== Legacy ==
Malaniuk's poems have been translated into several languages, including Russian, Polish, Czech, English and French.

An edition of the author's selected works with extensive annotation and bibliography was published in 1991 in Prešov.

In 1992 Kirovohrad Pedagogocal Instutute (today - Central Ukrainian State University, Kropyvnytskyi) established an annual literary prize named after Yevhen Malaniuk.

== List of works ==
=== Poetry collections ===
- Stylet i stylos (1925)
- Herbarii (1926)
- Zemlia i zalizo (1930)
- Zemna madonna (1934)
- Persten' Polikrata (1939)
- Vybrani poezii (1943)
- Vlada (1951)
- Poezii (1954)
- Proshcha (1954)
- Ostannia vesna (1959)
- Serpen (1964)
- Persten i posokh (1969) - published posthumously

=== Poem ===
- Piata symfonia (1953)

=== Collections of essays ===
- Narysy z istorii nashoi kultury (Essays on the History of Our Culture, 1954)
- Do problemy bolshevyzmu (On the Problem of Bolshevism, 1956)
- Knyha sposterezhen (A Book of Observations, 1962)

=== Other publications ===
- Dumky pro mystetstvo (Thoughts about Art, 1923)
- Geokultura Ukrainy (Geoculture of Ukraine, 1953)
- Doba baroko (Age of Baroque, 1954)
- Do problem kulturnoho protsesu (On the Problem of Cultural Process, 1954)

== Sources ==
- Українська Літературна Енциклопедія. — К., 1995. — Т. 3 (Ukrainian Literary Encyclopedia)
- Encyclopedia of Ukraine
