= A Spring Evening =

Poem written by Taras Shevchenko

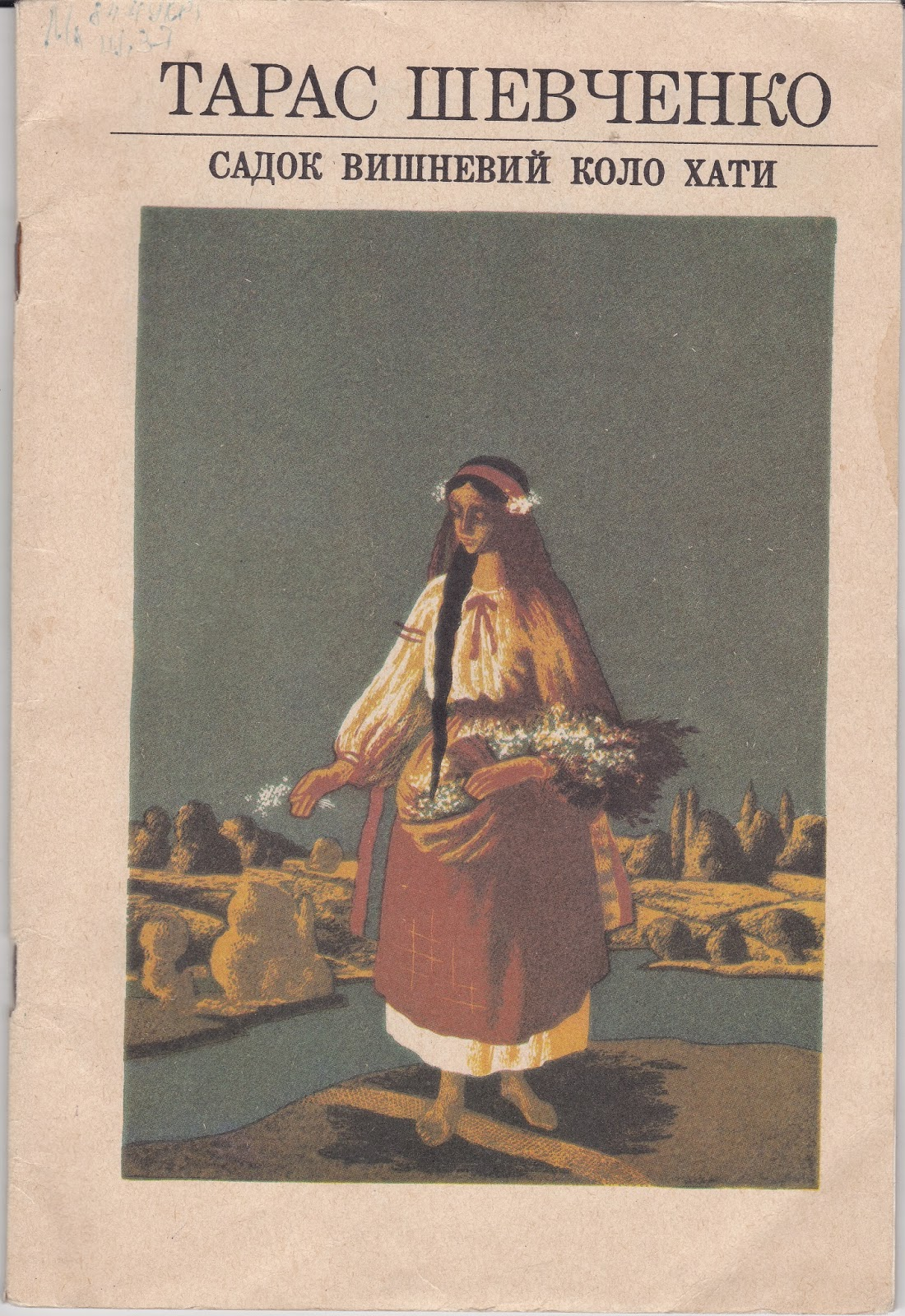
Illustration to the poem by Oleksandr Ivakhnenko

Singing performance of the poem set to music by Mykola Lysenko

A Spring Evening (Ukrainian: Весенній вечір) or May Evening (Ukrainian: Майський вечір) , also known as Beside the house, the cherry's flowering... (Ukrainian: Садок вишневий коло хати...) is a poem by Taras Shevchenko, written in 1847 during his imprisonment by the Third Department in Saint Petersburg.

== Publication ==
Included into the author's cycle In Casemate (Ukrainian: В казематі), the poem was first published in 1859, soon after its author's return from exile, and saw the light both in the original and in a Russian translation. In 1867 the poem's text was included into collections of Shevchenko's poetry published in Saint Petersburg and Lviv.

== Composition and analysis ==
Presenting an idyllic picture of Ukrainian village life, the poem is a characteristic example of Shevchenko's masterful use of recurrent words in order to achieve euphony. Scholars like R. Yu. Danilevsky have characterized the poem as presenting a "doomed idyll", as the poem depicts a peaceful Ukrainian rural life, but also has a tragic subtext, as at the time of its writing, Shevchenko was imprisoned. It has been suggested that the blessed imagery of the humming beetles and the evening meal in the poem serves as a dream of the unattainable for Shevchenko at the time, as a psychological escape. Danilevsky has further argued that Shevchenko's work in the poem echoes the "praise of rural life" that is present in the Bible and the works of Horace and the philosophy of Hryhorii Skovoroda. However, he says that unlike traditional European idylls that celebrate permanent stability, Shevchenko's version is inherently fragile because it is under constant threat of destruction.

== Text ==
Ukrainian original

Садок вишневий коло хати,
Хрущі над вишнями гудуть.
Плугатарі з плугами йдуть,
Співають, ідучи, дівчата,
А матері вечерять ждуть.

Сем’я вечеря коло хати,
Вечірня зіронька встає.
Дочка вечерять подає,
А мати хоче научати,
Так соловейко не дає.

Поклала мати коло хати
Маленьких діточок своїх,
Сама заснула коло їх.
Затихло все, тілько дівчата
Та соловейко не затих.

English translation by Honore Ewach

Close by the house the cherries flower,
Above the orchard the beetles hum,
Still singing, the girls homeward come,
The tired plowmen’s steps grow slower,
And mothers with supper wait at home.

Close by the house they eat their supper;
Just then the evening-star appears;
As daughter serves. Her mother cares
To teach to do things in ways proper.
The nightingale’s song interferes.

Close to the wall on the clay-benches
The mother lulls her Nell and Bill,
And falls asleep against her will.
All fall asleep... But the sweet wenches
And nightingales are singing still.

== Legacy ==
In the 1920s, the poem became popular with Ukrainian modernist writers like Mykola Kulish, who used its imagery to explore the tensions between traditional rural Ukrainian identity and the new Soviet reality following the civil war. He especially shows this in his play entitled "The Zone" from 1926, which copies the idyllic lines from A Spring Evening in order to highlight the poverty of a post-revolutionary village in Ukraine ironically. Kulish also later references the imagery of A Spring Evening in "Sonata Pathetique", which contrasts it with the "world of machines" and the violence of the Ukrainian War of Independence, which Kulish sees as a dream of national harmony that was never fulfilled.
