= Moysey Fishbein =

Ukrainian writer (1946–2020)

Moysey (Moses) Abramovych Fishbein (Ukrainian: Мойсей Абрамович Фішбейн; 1 December 1946 – 26 May 2020) was an influential Ukrainian poet and translator of Jewish origin.

== Biography ==
Moysey Fishbein was born on 1 December 1946 in Chernivtsi (then a city in the Ukrainian SSR). He graduated in philology in 1976 from Kyiv Pedagogical Institute. He later was an editor at the Ukrainian Soviet Encyclopedia. The early works of the young poet were noted and supported by famous Ukrainian author Mykola Bazhan, who played a significant role in promoting Fishbein's first publications.

In 1979 Fishbein was forced to make Aliyah to the State of Israel, for his role as a Soviet dissident. The limited opportunities for an author of Ukrainian poetry in Israel caused him to make Yerida to West Germany in 1982. There Fishbein worked as a journalist at the Ukrainian diaspora magazine Suchasnist ("Our Times"), as well as giving Ukrainian and Russian broadcasts of Radio Liberty between 1982 and 1995.

After the collapse of the USSR, the poet returned to Ukraine in 2003.

Moysey Fishbein considered himself a Ukrainian nationalist and took an active part in the social and political life of Ukraine. His speech on the requiem-meeting about the Holodomor tragedy in 2006 was often cited among the Ukrainians. In March 2008, the poet received a special award from Head of Ukrainian Greek Catholic Church for "zeal for God’s Glory and his great contribution in informing the public of Metropolitan Andrey Sheptytskyi’s and the Ukrainian Greek Catholic Church clergy’s sacrificial efforts to rescue Jews during the Holocaust."

The author was a member of the Writer's Union of Ukraine and Ukrainian center of International PEN Club.

According to the Jewish Encyclopedia, Fishbein helped to organize medical treatment in Israel and later in West Germany for the Ukrainian children injured by the Chernobyl disaster.

Fishbein died on 26 May 2020, aged 73. He was survived by his wife Olena. Also, his 4 granddaughters and his daughters Aviva (1985) and Maria (1976) from his first marriage to Ludmila.

== Works ==
- "Ranniy Ray" ("Early Paradise") – collected works
- "Zbirka Bez Nazvy" ("An Untitled Compilation")
- Дивний сад» / "Garden of Miracles", Vaselka, Kyiv, 1991 - poems for children
- «Апокриф» / "Apocrypha", Dnipro, Kyiv, 1996 - poems, translations, poetry
- «Розпорошени тини» / "Scattered Shadows", Calabria, Lviv, 2001 – poems
- «Аферизми» / "Stains", Pact, Kyiv, 2003
- «Ранний рай» / "Paradise at dawn", Pact, Kyiv, 2006 - selected works
- «Райнер Мария Рильке. Сто поезий у прекладі Мойсея Фишбейна» ("Rainer Maria Rilke. One hundred poems translated by Moisei Fishbein"), Libid, Kyiv, 2012
- «Пророк» / "Prophet", Labid, Kyiv, 2017 – poems, translations

One of the many books of poems and poetical translations of Fishbein was published in the "Suchasnist" publishing house in New York City in 1984.

The poet was one of the few Ukrainian authors, presented in the world anthology "Stanzas of the century" published in Russia at the end of 20th century.

Several of Fishbein's poems were translated into English by Roman Turovsky.
