= Maister korablia =

1928 novel by Yuriy Yanovskyi

Master of the Ship
- Author: Yurii Yanovskyi
- Language: Ukrainian
- Genre: Modernist novel
- Publication date: 1928
- Publication place: Soviet Ukraine
- Media type: Print

Maister korablia is a 1928 Ukrainian novel by writer Yuriy Yanovskyi. It was his first novel. English-language sources render the title in different ways, including Master of the Ship, The Ship’s Figurehead, and The Shipmaster.
