= Yudif Rozhavskaya =

Yudif Grigorevna Rozhavskaya (12 November 1923-10 March 1982) was a Ukrainian pianist and a versatile composer who worked in many genres, including serialism.

Rozhavskaya, whose nickname was “Didi,” was born in Kyiv. She began playing piano at age five, and was considered a prodigy. She earned graduate and postgraduate degrees at the Kyiv Conservatory (today the Ukrainian National Tchaikovsky Academy of Music) where her teachers included E. Slyvak (piano) and Matvey Akimovich Gozenpud (composition). She married the poet Rurik Nemyrovskyi.

During World War II, Rozhavskaya served with a concert brigade at the Stalingrad Front and was later awarded a medal for her service. After the war, she was admitted to the Union of Composers.

Rozhavskaya composed more than 100 songs and 50 romances, many for children, based on texts by Anna Akhmatova, George Byron, Ivan Franko, Vitalii Korotych, Mikhail Lermontov, Alexander Pushkin, Maksym Rylskyi, Taras Shevchenko, Volodymyr Sosiura, Pavlo Tychyna, Lesia Ukrainka and others. Other compositions included:

== Ballet ==
- Kingdom of Crooked Mirrors

== Cantata ==
- Glory to Women Workers (text by Olha Marunych)
- My Soviet Ukraine (based on text by Mykhailo Stelmakh)

== Cartoon Soundtrack ==
- Pushok i Druzhok
- Tyav and Gav
- Vesnyanka
- Vesyolyy Khudozhnik

== Chamber ==
- Elegy (violin and piano)
- Suite (violin and piano)
- Two Intermezzos (violin and piano)
- Variations on Russian Themes (violin, cello and piano)

== Opera ==
- Skazka o Poteryannom Vremeni (Tale of Lost Time; libretto by Rozhavskaya and Lidiia Kompaniets after Yevhen Schwartz)

== Operetta ==
- Conceited Leveret (for children; based on a story by Sergei Mikhalkov)
- Kazka Pro Zagublenii Chas (for children)

== Orchestra ==
- Dnipro Symphonic Poem
- Fantasy for Folk Instrument Orchestra

== Piano ==
- Piano Concerto
- Piano Sonata
- Variations on a Ukrainian Theme (two pianos)
