= VAPLITE =

Literary union in Ukraine

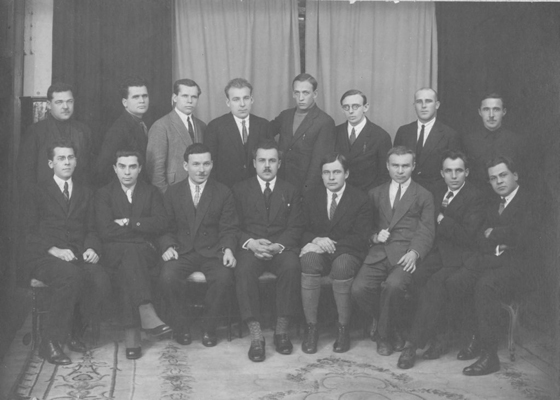
Members of VAPLITE in 1926, seated from left to right: Pavlo Tychyna, Mykola Khvylovy, Mykola Kulish, Oleksa Slisarenko, Mike Johansen, Gordiy Kotsyuba, Petro Punch, Arkady Lyubchenko. Standing, from left to right: Mykhailo Maisky, Hryhoriy Epik, Oleksandr Kopylenko, Ivan Senchenko, Pavlo Ivanov, Yuriy Smolych, Oles Dosvitniy, Ivan Dniprovsky.

The Vilna Akademia Proletarskoi Literatury (abbr. ВАПЛІТЕ, Ukrainian: Вільна академія пролетарської літератури, lit. 'Free Academy of Proletarian Literature') was a literary union in Ukraine. It was established in Kharkiv and existed from January 1926 to January 28, 1928.

Accepting the official requirements of the Communist Party, in literary policy VAPLITE has taken an independent position and was standing on the grounds of creating the new Ukrainian literature by qualified artists who put in front of them the demand of improvement and mastering the best achievements of western European culture. The virtual leader of the union was Mykola Khvylovy; the president were Mykhailo Yalovy, later - Mykola Kulish; and the secretary was Arkadiy Liubchenko.

In the organization actively worked, the above-mentioned, Mykola Khvylovy, Mykhailo Yalovy, Oles Dosvitny, Mykola Kulish, Hryhorii Epik, Pavlo Tychyna, Ivan Senchenko, Oleksa Slisarenko, Petro Panch, Mykola Bazhan, Yuriy Yanovskyi, Yuriy Smolych, Ivan Dniprovsky, Oleksandr Kopylenko etc. Alexander Dovzhenko was also a member of VAPLITE.

Prior to the organization of the association the major literary associations were the Union of Proletarian Writers Hart and the Union of Peasant Writers Pluh. Those organizations were mostly culturally enlightening which in actuality distracted them from their literary artistic goals.

In 1927, VAPLITE was issuing its magazine VAPLITE.

The views of Mykola Khvylovy led to criticism from the Party and government personnel of the Ukrainian SSR. Especially sharp attacks suffered his work, "Waldshnepy". Due to constant persecutions VAPLITE was forced to self-dissolve in 1928. The members of VAPLITE continued their literary activity in the literary almanac Literary Fair (1928–29) and the organization "Politfront". The members of VAPLITE were among the first victims of Stalin regime's repressions.

== Mission ==
The Organization was based on the notion that the creation of modern Ukrainian literature can be promoted by learning from the best works of Western European culture.

Despite agreeing to strict bureaucratic limitations made by the communist party, in questions related to literary agenda, VAPLITE had an independent stance and believed in founding the new Ukrainian literature by qualified artists who aimed at self-improvement and researching and adapting best practices of Western culture. The leader of VAPLITE was Mykola Khvylovy, the one to proclaim their famous motto "Away from Moscow!" The presidents of the organization was Mykhailo Yalovy (later Mykola Kulish), while Arkadiy Liubchenko was the secretary.

== Activities ==
Despite the fact that the members of this group used to belong to different parties, also studying different styles and directions in artistic creativity, VAPLITE was an ideological group. Their leading idea was the revival of the Ukrainian nation.

They paid great attention to the study of European languages.

Thanks to the contribution of Mykola Khvylovy who is considered the creator of a new worldview and ideology, in the activities of the literary association, a new idea of the image of Ukraine, the nature of Ukrainian culture and spirituality gradually began to form.

In 1926, two collections were published - "VAPLITE, the first notebook" (with articles and statements) and "VAPLITE, the first almanac" (works of art), and in 1927 - six issues of the two-month magazine "VAPLITE", which published art works, criticism, theoretical articles, current chronicle of literary events, etc. From the very beginning, the participants and the magazine came under the close scrutiny of official circles. The ideological criticism of VAPLITE and Mykola Khvylovy himself intensified and became especially coordinated after the formation of Molodnyak and VUSPP (All-Ukrainian Union of Proletarian Writers). In 1927, VAPLITE published the magazine VAPLITE, which published Nikifor Shcherbina, among others.

== Bibliography ==
- "Electronic materials from the Ukrainian culture". Issue #3: "Vaplite (1926–1927)". - Kyiv: Criticism, 2005. (Six numbers of the magazine "Vaplite" and the almanac "Vaplite" in pdf-file on a compact disc)
