= Svirlag =

Soviet forced labour camp

Coordinates: 60°46′45″N 33°18′40″E

Svirlag, SvirLAG (Svirskiy Lager' – Svir Camp, Russian: Свирлаг, also Свирьлаг / СвирЛАГ was a Soviet forced labour camp run by NKVD's GULAG Directorate. It was located by the river Svir (hence the name Svirskiy in Russian) in the forests north-east of Leningrad, in Leningrad Oblast. Headquartered in the town Lodeynoye Pole, it housed both political and criminal convicts and operated during 1931–1937. Estimated 100,000 persons in total were incarcerated in the camp at various times. SvirLAG camp was a supplier of wood for Saint Petersburg and its oblast.

== History ==
The camp was established on September 17, 1931.

The Lagpunkts (detachments) of Svirag were in various locations of Lodeynopolsky and Podporozhsky districts of Leningrad Oblast, as well as in Karelia. One of them was located in the medieval buildings of what was formerly the Alexander-Svirsky Monastery. Bolsheviks closed and vandalized the monastery in 1918 (it finally ceased in 1925). The holy relics were removed, monks expelled. The chief of the monastery archimandrite Evgeniy (Efim Trofimov), together with some other church personalities, was accused of anti-Soviet activities and executed on 2 November (20 October O.S.) 1918.

== Notable convicts ==
- Archbishop Augustine (Alexander Belayev) (imprisoned in SvirLAG in 1931–1934, executed November 23, 1937), Russian Orthodox archbishop.
- Stepan Rudnytsky – Ukrainian geographer, founder of Ukrainian geography (born in Tarnopol in 1877, then Austro-Hungary), sat in SvirLAG in 1933–1937 where he was also executed in 1937 .
- Yulian Shpol (literary name, in life: Mykhaylo Yalovyi – Ukrainian writer (born in Poltava region), arrested in 1933 and May 11, 1934 with special convoy sent to SvirLAG, 2,5 years later executed in SvirLAG November 3, 1937.
- Sampson Sievers – hieromonk (born of English mother) of Saint Petersburg's Alexander Nevsky Lavra was imprisoned and tortured in this camp (from 1932, what is witnessed by archival documents and personal testimonies), though survived.
- Vladimir Vorobyov (b. in 1876 in Russia's Saratov Region, sat in SvirLAG in 1931–1932, died in Kuybyshev prison in 1940 from heart paralysis) – archpriest of the Russian Orthodox Church
- Magzhan Zhumabayev – Kazakh poet, arrested by Soviet authorities in 1929, sent to Svirlag where he was imprisoned until June 2, 1934. Arrested again in 1935 in Alma-Ata, March 1938 he was executed by organs of NKVD.
