= Mykola Bazhan =

Ukrainian writer, poet, political and public figure (1904–1983)

Mykola Bazhan MFSTUkrSSR
- Микола Бажан
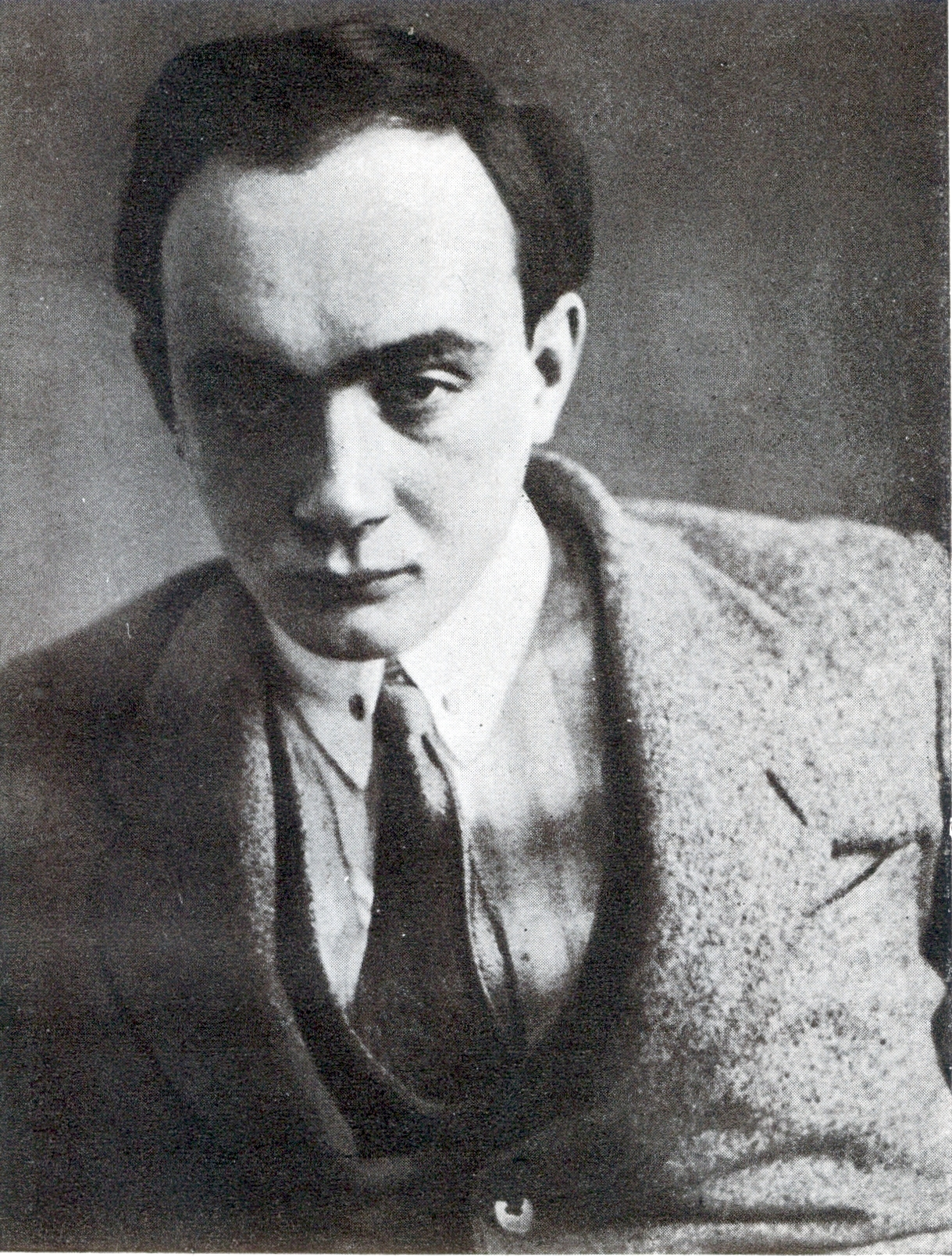
- Bazhan in 1928
- Born: 26 September 1904; Kamianets-Podilskyi, Russian Empire (today Khmelnytskyi Oblast, Ukraine)
- Died: 23 November 1983 (aged 79); Kiev, Ukrainian SSR, Soviet Union
- Occupations: Writer; poet; academician
- Writing career
- Language: Ukrainian
- Notable awards: Shevchenko National Prize

Mykola Platonovych Bazhan (Ukrainian: Микола Платонович Бажан; 9 October [O.S. 26 September] 1904 – 23 November 1983) was a Soviet Ukrainian writer, poet, highly decorated political and public figure. He was an academician of the Academy of Sciences of the Ukrainian SSR (1951), Merited Functionary in Science and Technology of Ukrainian SSR (1966), Distinguished Figure in Arts of Georgian SSR (1964), People's Poet of Uzbek SSR.

== Career ==
Bazhan was a People's Deputy of the Supreme Soviet of the Soviet Union for two of five convocations (1946–1962), and the Supreme Council of the Ukrainian SSR for six of nine convocations (1963–1980). He was a member of the Central Committee of the Communist Party of the Soviet Union and was elected to the Central Committee of the Communist Party of the Ukrainian SSR on several occasions at the party's congresses (17 of and 21 of 25). In 1943–49 Bazhan was a Deputy Chairman of the Council of Minister (Commissars) of the Ukrainian SSR.

== Biography ==
=== Childhood and early career ===
Mykola Bazhan was born in city of Kamenyets, an administrative center of Podolia Governorate, yet his youth years he spent in Uman, Kiev Governorate. His father Platon Artemovych Bazhan, a native of Poltava region, was a military cartographer and a veteran of the Ukrainian People's Army. During his time in Uman, at the age of 14, Bazhan joined the ranks of Plast movement.

In 1923 Mykola Bazhan graduated from the Uman Cooperative College and moved to Kiev where he studied at the Kiev Cooperative Institute (1921-1923) and in the Kiev institute of foreign relations (1923-1925). He was active in the Futurist literary movement, and his first poem «Ruro-marsh» («Руро-марш») was published in Kiev in 1923. Bazhan’s first book of poems, Seventeenth Patrol, published in Kharkiv in 1926, was markedly Futurist. Yet, in the same year Bazhan left the Futurist groups and joined VAPLITE, an artistic union affiliated with classic models of European culture and demanding literary excellence from its members. In this period, Bazhan developed a unique style combining features of Expressionism, Romanticism and Baroque art. The Buildings (1929) epitomized these literary ideas via complex imagery of a Gothic cathedral, a gate in the style of Ukrainian Baroque, and a Modernist house.

=== Work for the Soviet government ===
During the 1930s Bazhan's works were viewed as "anti-proletarian" and became a subject of a number official anti-nationalist campaigns. In 1937 he felt his arrest was imminent and he rarely slept at home. In 1939 Bazhan was awarded the Order of Lenin for his translation into Ukrainian of the epic poem "The Warrior in the Tiger's skin" by the medieval Georgian poet Shota Rustaveli. Bazhan found out about this, from a newspaper, while hiding from his imminent arrest in a city park in Kiev. He was eventually told by Nikita Khrushchev that his arrest had been ordered, but Stalin was fond of his Rustaveli translation, and changed his mind. In 1940 Mykola Bazhan joined the Communist Party of the Soviet Union and in the same year became a member of the Presidium of the Writers' Union of Ukraine.

During the Great Patriotic War Bazhan became a military reporter and the editor of the newspaper For the Soviet Ukraine. In 1943 he published a book, Stalingrad Notebook, for which in 1946 he received the Stalin Prize. In 1953-59 Bazhan headed the Writers' Union of Ukraine. As head of the Union, in May 1954, at the beginning of the Khrushchev Thaw, he sent a letter to the Central Committee of the Communist Party of Ukraine, in which he raised the issue of publishing works and introducing creative biographies of Vasyl Chumak, Myroslav Irchan, Mykyta Cherniavsky, Ivan Mikitenko, and Pilip Kapelhorodsky, most of which were killed or executed in 1937-1938, into the course of the history of Ukrainian Soviet literature. On July 2, 1956 he raised before the Central Committee of the Communist Party of Ukraine the issue of rehabilitation of several repressed writers: Vasyl Bobynsky, Hryhorii Epik, Ivan Kulyk, Mykola Kulish, and many more.

=== Later years ===
In 1970 Bazhan was nominated for the Nobel Prize in literature, but was forced by Soviet authorities to write a letter refusing his candidature.

From 1957 and until his death, Bazhan was the founding chief editor of the Main Edition of Ukrainian Soviet Encyclopedia publishing. The publishing was not completed in his lifetime; the first edition was, however, released as Ukrainian Soviet Encyclopedia in 17 volumes in 1959–1965. A second (and final, as events would develop) 12-volume work was released in 1977–1985. The enterprise was additionally responsible for a large number of other major Ukrainian reference works. Bazhan also was one of co-authors of the Anthem of the Ukrainian Soviet Socialist Republic. He died in Kyiv on 23 November 1983.

== Personal life and contacts ==
In 1926 Bazhan married Ukrainian writer and native of Kiev Halyna Kovalenko. They divorced in 1938, and he remarried, to Nina Lauer, shortly thereafter.

Moisei Fishbein, a notable Ukrainian poet was Bazhan's literary secretary.

== Bazhan in English ==
A collection of English translations of Bazhan's futurist poetry titled Quiet Spiders of the Hidden Soul was published by the Academic Studies Press in 2019. These include translations by Roman Turovsky.

== Awards and prizes ==
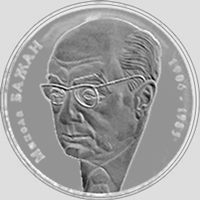
Coin of Bazhan by the National Bank of Ukraine

- Stalin Prize 2nd class (1946 and 1949)
- Taras Shevchenko State Prize of the Ukrainian SSR (1965)
- State Prize of the Ukrainian SSR (1971)
- Hero of Socialist Labour (27 September 1974)
- Order of Lenin (31 January 1939, 9 October 1954, 24 November 1960, 8 October 1964, 27 September 1974)
- Order of the October Revolution (3 July 1971)
- Order of the Red Banner (1 April 1943)
- Order of the Red Banner of Labour (23 January 1948, 28 October 1967)
