= Mykola Kulish =

Ukrainian writer and playwright (1892–1937)

- Микола Куліш
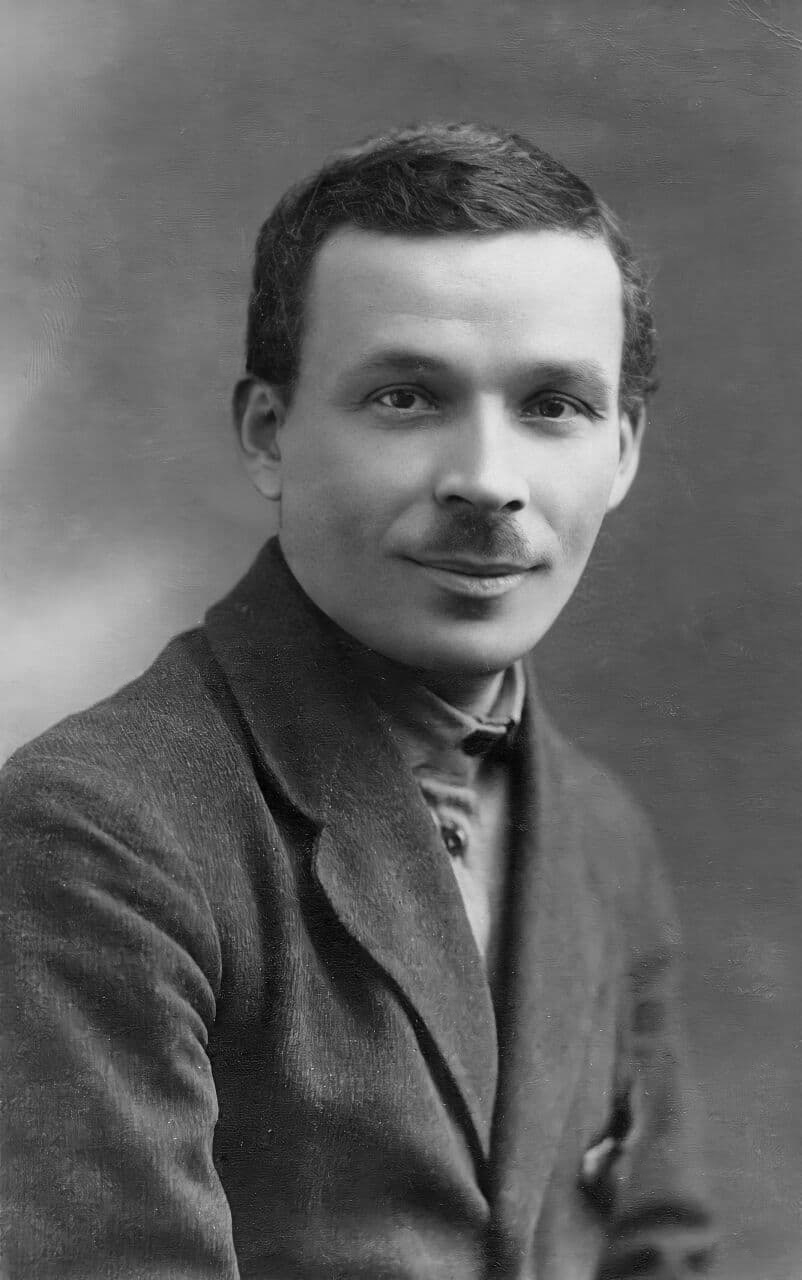
- Kulish in the 1920s
- Born: 18 December 1892; Chaplynka, Dneprovsky Uyezd, Taurida Governorate, Russian Empire
- Died: 3 November 1937 (aged 44); Sandarmokh, Medvezhyegorsk, Karelian ASSR, Russian SFSR, Soviet Union
- Occupations: Pedagogue; prose writer; playwright
- Spouse: Antonina
- Writing career
- Period: 1913–1934
- Notable work: Myna Mazailo
- Movements: Hart, VAPLITE, Politfront

Mykola Hurovych Kulish (Ukrainian: Микола Гурович Куліш; 18 December 1892 – 3 November 1937) was a Ukrainian prose writer, playwright, pedagogue, veteran of World War I, and Red Army veteran. He is considered to be one of the lead figures of the Executed Renaissance; he was murdered by the NKVD during Stalin’s Great Terror.

== Biography ==
Kulish was born in the village of Chaplynka, which in his letters he called Chaplyn. From age 9 he studied in a parish church and school. From 1905 Kulish studied at the Oleshky municipal eight-year school. Here he met with Ivan Dniprovskyi. In 1908 he enrolled into the Oleshky pro-gymnasium which was closed down before he could graduate. During his school years, he published several short verses and epigrams in students' hand-written magazines which gave him a certain degree of fame among his peers. In 1913 for the first time he wrote a play At fish catching (Russian: На рыбной ловле) which later became the base for his comedy That was how perished Huska (Ukrainian: Отак загинув Гуска).

At 22, he enrolled in the Novorossiysk University Philology Department. However his education was interrupted again because of World War I as he was drafted into the Army. At first, he served as a private in a reserve battalion. In 1914 he was sent to the Odesa school of praporshchiks (ensigns) after which he served at the front from 1915–1917. He continued to write short verses and small plays which were published in the military press-media. In 1917 already as an officer, he chose the side of the February Revolution.

From the start of 1918, he was the head of the Oleshky Council of Workers' and Peasants' Deputies. In July 1919 in Kherson, he organized the Dnipro Peasantry Regiment as part of RKKA. The regiment participated in the defense of Kherson and Mykolaiv from the forces of Anton Denikin. During the government of Hetman Pavlo Skoropadskyy, he was imprisoned for five months. After the return of the Red Army he was appointed as the chief of staff of Kherson and Dnipro uyezd Army groups.

After the demobilization in 1920 he worked as an instructor for several bodies of People's Education in Oleshky uyezd as well as edited the newspaper Chervonyi Shliakh in Zinovyevsk. During this time he put together a Ukrainian alphabet Pervynka. He also started to tour around the southern Ukraine organizing various schools and helping the hungry during the famine of 1921–1922. He later wrote a two-part story about this in Russian, Po vesiam i selam.

In 1922 he worked in the governorate department of People's Education in Odesa as a school inspector. In 1924 Kulish wrote a play 97 where he described the famine of the Kherson region in 1921–1922. Together with another play, Commune in steppes (1925), his works were staged in Kharkiv and brought him a general recognition. In Odesa he joined the writers' society of Hart. In 1925 returned to Zinovyevsk where he edited Chervony Shliakh. Later that year, he moved to Kharkiv, where he met with various prominent Ukrainian writers and poets such as Mykola Khvyliovyi, Ostap Vyshnia, Yuriy Yanovskyi, Volodymyr Sosiura, and many others. Here Kulish became a member of VAPLITE and worked with the theatrical group Berezil led by Les Kurbas.

In November 1926, he was elected as the president of VAPLITE until January 1928. Simultaneously with it, Kulish was a member of the editorial collegiate of Chervonyi Shliakh. His works were published in the almanac Literary Fair. Since the end of 1929, Kulish was a member of the presidium of a new literary union Politfront. Suddenly since 1930, all his fame started diminishing receiving all kinds of negative critical reviews. Kulish moved out of Kharkiv back to his native Kherson region. After the Holodomor of 1933, he grew more and more upset with the Soviet regime. During that time, his plays Narodnyi Malakhiy, Myna Mazailo, and Pathetic sonata were recognized as hostile to the communist regime.

== Repression and death ==
At the first All-Union Congress of Soviet Writers in Moscow (17 August – 1 September 1934) Mykola Kulish was publicly denounced as a bourgeois-nationalist playwright. Particularly critical of him was Ivan Kulyk, who also mentioned the theatrical troop of Les Kurbas as one who performed Kulish's plays.

In December 1934, after the burial of his friend Ivan Dniprovskyi, Kulish was arrested by the agents of NKVD and sent to the Solovki prison camp in the White Sea.

Kulish was one of the "lost transport" of prisoners shipped back to the mainland in 1937 from Solovki. It is now known that he was shot on 3 November with 289 other members of the Ukrainian intelligentsia at Sandarmokh near Medvezhyegorsk, Karelian ASSR. The site was discovered in 1997.

A few years after the death of Stalin in 1953, Kulish was posthumously declared innocent of the 1934 charges and rehabilitated.

== Works ==
- 97
- Commune in steppes
- Farewell, village
- That was how Huska perished
- Khuliy Khuryna
- Zone
- Nook (Zakut)
- Eternal mutiny
- Legend about Lenin
- Colonies
- Narodnyi Malakhiy
- Myna Mazailo
- Sonata Pathétique
- Maklena Grasa
- Autobiography from a notebook

== See also ==
- Chervonyi Shliakh
