= Yuriy Yanovskyi =

Ukrainian Soviet poet (1902–1954)

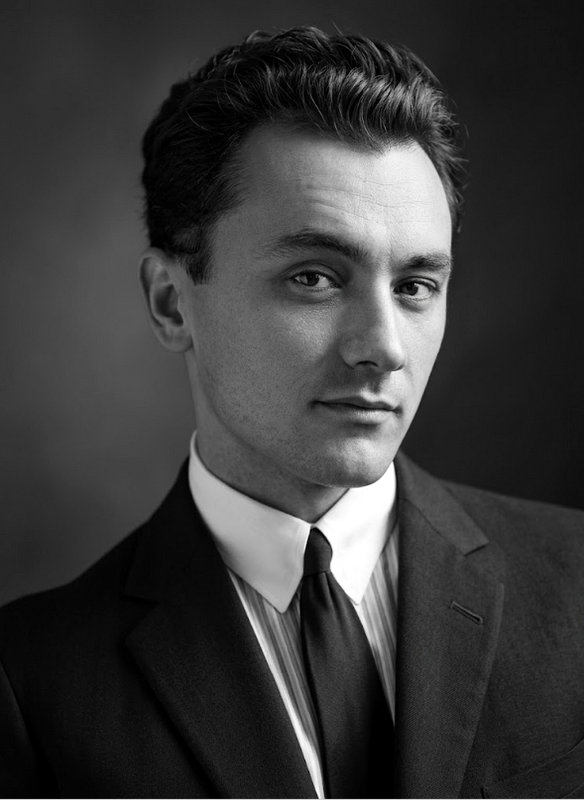
- Yanovskyi in 1928
- Born: August 12, 1902; Nechaivka village, Kherson Governorate, Russian Empire
- Died: February 25, 1954 (aged 51); Kyiv, Ukrainian SSR, Soviet Union
- Resting place: Baikove Cemetery
- Occupations: writer, poet, screenwriter
- Writing career
- Language: Ukrainian, Russian

Signature
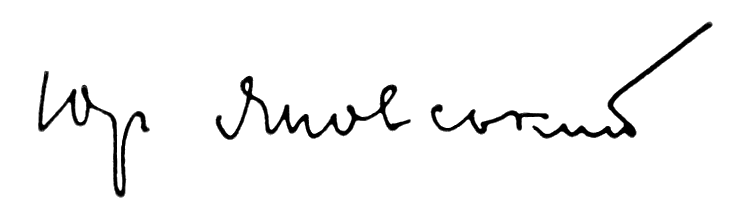

Yuriy Ivanovich Yanovskyi (Ukrainian: Ю́рій Іва́нович Яно́вський; 14 August [N.S. 27 August] 1902 – 25 February 1954) was a Ukrainian Soviet poet, playwright and screenwriter.

== Biography ==
Yanovskyi was born in a peasant family. After receiving his secondary education, he served as a soldier in the First World War, from which he was demobilized in 1918. There he worked in various jobs between 1919 and 1921, before settling in Kyiv in 1922 and enrolling at the Electrical Engineering Faculty of the Kyiv Polytechnic Institute. On 1 May 1922, his first poem, "The Sea" (Море) in Russian under the pseudonym Heorhij Nej (Георгій Ней) and "Bell" in Ukrainian under his own name appeared in the newspaper Proletarska Pravda.

In 1924 he was a freelance correspondent for the newspaper Bolshevik, in which his first prose piece, the short story "And then the Germans fled" (A potim nimtsi tikali), was published. In 1925 his collection Mammoth Tusks was published, which contains stories about specific events of the Russian Civil War, and in 1927 his book Blood of the Earth was published. From 1925 to 1926, Yanovskyi worked as an art editor at the Odessa film studios, where he wrote several screenplays.

In 1926-27 he lived in Odessa and worked there as chief editor of the All-Ukrainian Photo Cinema Administration (VUFKU). Here he met his wife, the Ukrainian theater actress Tamara Shevchenko-Yanovska. In 1927, Yanovsky returned to Kharkov where he belonged to the Kharkov literary youth that grouped around Mykola Khvylovy. In 1928, he published his first novel, Maister korablia. From 1939 onwards he lived in Kyiv. During the Second World War he was editor of the magazine Ukrainian Literature and a military correspondent for the First Ukrainian Front of the Red Army. After the war, he was a correspondent at the Nuremberg Trials in 1945.

His most important post-war work was the 1947 novel "Living Water" (Жива вода). However, after the novel was sharply criticized for its nationalism and its petty-bourgeois views, he was forced to make almost 200 corrections to it according to the principles of socialist realism. The novel was eventually published posthumously in 1956 under the title "Peace" (Мир). On February 16, 1954, the premiere of his play The Prosecutor's Daughter took place. Some of his later poems from the 1940s and 1950s were published in the five-volume collection of his works published in 1958/59.

His best known works have been translated into numerous languages and published in Bulgaria, the GDR, Poland, Hungary, Czechoslovakia, Austria, Italy and France.
