= Mykola Khvylovy =

Ukrainian author (1893–1933)

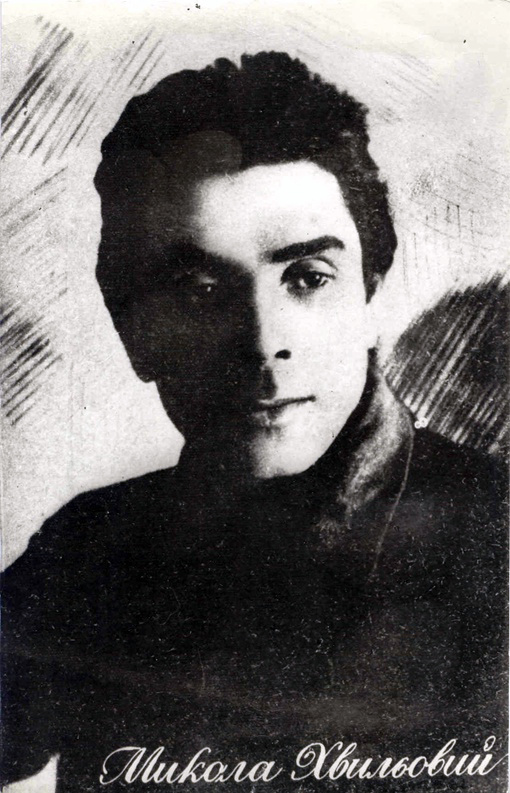
- Born: Mykola Hryhorovych Fitiliov; December 1, 1893; Trostianets, Akhtyrsky Uyezd, Kharkov Governorate, Russian Empire
- Died: May 13, 1933 (aged 39); Kharkiv, Ukrainian SSR, USSR
- Occupations: writer, poet
- Writing career
- Pen name: Mykola Khvylovy, Yuliya Umanets, Stefan Karol, Dyadko Mykola
- Language: Ukrainian
- Period: 1921–1933
- Genres: short story, pamphlet

Mykola Khvylovy (Ukrainian: Микола Хвильовий, romanized: Mykola Khvyliovyi [mɪˈkɔlɐ xwɪlʲoˈwɪj]; born Mykola Hryhorovych Fitiliov [Микола Григорович Фітільов]; 13 December [O.S. 1 December] 1893 – May 13, 1933) was a Ukrainian novelist, poet, publicist, and political activist, one of the founders of post-revolutionary Ukrainian prose, and one of the most famous representatives of the Ukrainian Renaissance in literature of the 1920s–1930s. Khvylovy was one of the main figures of Ukrainian 'National Communism' and the creator of the slogan "Away from Moscow!"

== Biography ==
Born as Mykola Fitilyov in Trostianets, Akhtyrsky Uyezd, Kharkov Governorate, Russian Empire to a Russian laborer father and Ukrainian schoolteacher mother. His father, Hryhoriy Oleksiiovych Fitilyov, had noble origins but was, as Khvylovy himself wrote, "a highly careless person" and a drunkard. He spoke Russian, and it was thanks to him that the boy read both Russian and foreign classics. Khvylovy shared his father's interest in the revolutionary movement of the 1860s, sympathised with the ideology of the Narodniks, the former Russian populists of that era, and was equally inspired by the works of Nikolay Dobrolyubov, Vissarion Belinsky and Dmitry Pisarev.

He studied at an elementary school in the village of Kolontayev, where his mother, Yelyzaveta Ivanivna (nee Tarasenko), was a teacher, then continued his studies at the Okhtyr Male Gymnasium, which he was forced to leave due to his participation in a so-called Ukrainian revolutionary circle, and later at the Bohodukhiv Gymnasium, from which he was expelled for his connections with socialists during the revolutionary unrest.

As a teenager, he traveled around Donbas and southern Ukraine in search of income. Later, he worked as a locksmith in a craft school, in the office of the parish council of the village of Rublivky, and participated in the work of the local "Prosvita".

Drafted in 1914, he was sent to the front in 1915, where he endured "three years of marches, hunger, terrible horror that I would not dare to describe; three years of squared Golgotha on the distant fields of Galicia, Carpathians, Romania and so on and so forth".

When the February Revolution brought down the Tsar, Khvylovy joined the Ukrainian Party of Socialist Revolutionaries ("UPSR") and eagerly embraced the causes of social revolution and Ukrainian independence. As the head of a volunteer unit of Free Cossacks, which he organized at the end of 1918 in the Kharkiv region, he fought against supporters of the Hetman, the Germans, the White Army forces led by Mikhail Drozdovsky, and the army of the Ukrainian People's Republic or "UNR", which he had originally supported, but which subsequently ordered his arrest. The civil war made him a convinced Bolshevik; in his words he "fully accepted the Bolshevik ideology" and joined the Communist Party in 1919. That same year, he married a teacher, Kateryna Gashchenko, who bore him a daughter, Iraida, but the marriage quickly fell apart due to Khvylovy's infidelity.

At the beginning of 1921, he went to "conquer" Kharkiv, then the capital of Ukraine. He worked as a locksmith and married Yulia Umantseva, who had a daughter from her first marriage, Lyubov, whom Khvylovy accepted as his own and affectionately called Lyubistka.

In the same year, he involved himself with writers connected to Vasyl Blakytny and the paper Visti VUTsVK (news from All-Ukrainian Central Executive Committee). In 1921, with Volodymyr Sosiura and Maik Yohansen, he signed the literary manifesto "Our Decree to the Ukrainian Workers and Ukrainian Proletarian Artists" (published in the collection Zhovten’). In the same year his poem "V elektrychnyi vik" (In the Electrical Age) and his poetry collection Molodist’ (Youth) were published.

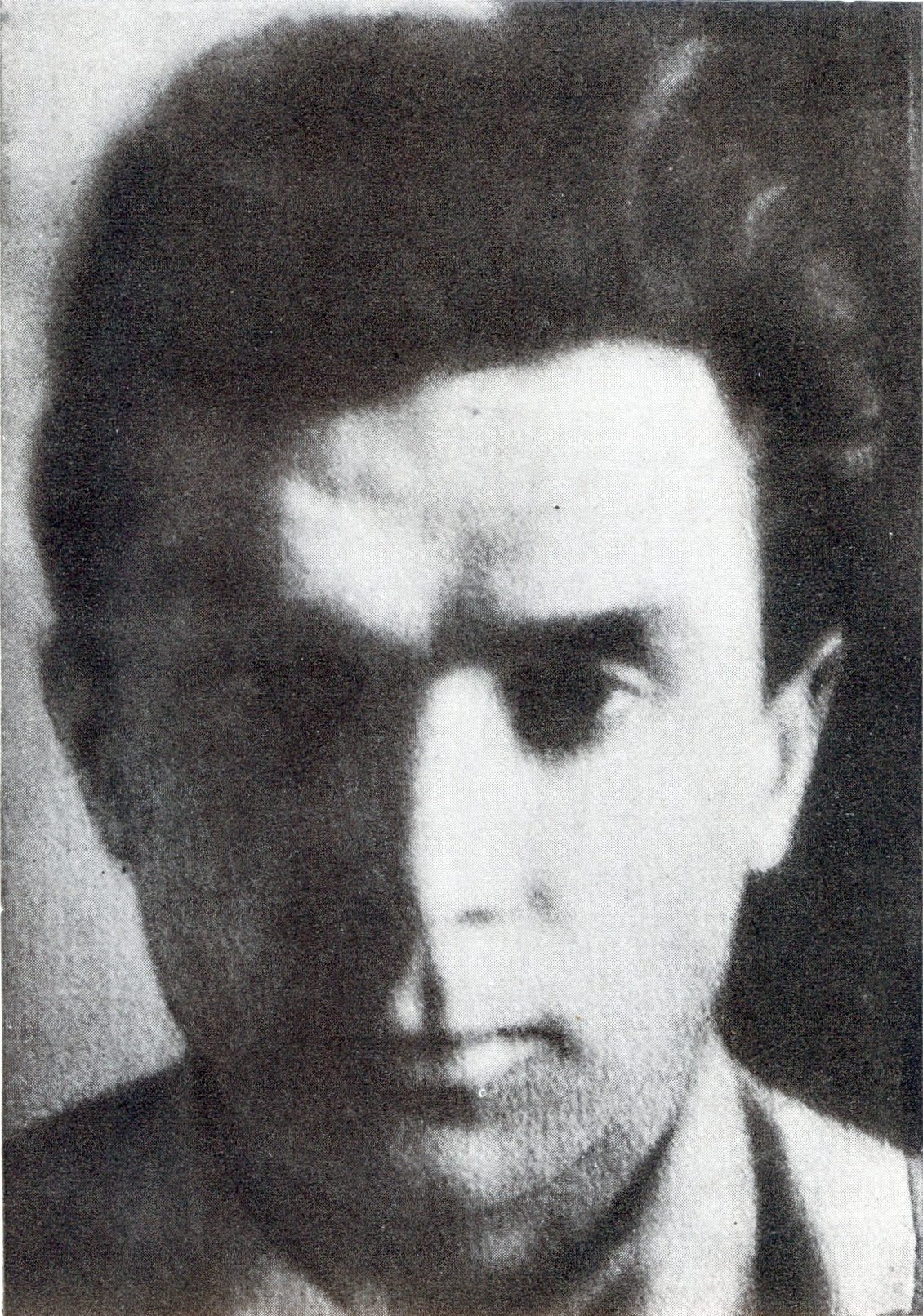
Mykola Khvylovy in 1928

In 1922, he began to focus more on prose writing. His initial collections Syni etiudy (Blue Etudes, 1923) and Osin’ (Autumn, 1924), generated approval from critics such as Serhiy Yefremov, Oleksander Biletsky, Volodymyr Koriak, Yevhen Malaniuk and Dmytro Dontsov.

Khvylovy also threw himself into organizing literary and artistic movements and organizations. During his brief time as a member of the literary organization Hart ("Hardening") he created the semi-official studio "Urbino", which was held in his apartment and was the prototype of VAPLITE, an organization of Ukrainian "proletariat" writers. He was also associated with the literary movement known as "Prolitfront", but became disenchanted with it due to its hostility to issues of Ukrainian identity.

Khvylovy was sharply critical of Russian literature, both past and present, and urged Ukrainian writers to look to the West instead. He considered the nineteenth century classics of Russian literature to be shot through with "passive pessimism" and populated by "cadres of 'superfluous people', or, to put it simply, parasites, 'dreamers', people 'without any given responsibility', 'whimperers', 'grey little people' of the 'twentieth rank'", and therefore useless as a model for the Ukrainian literature of the twentieth century. He adopted the slogan "Death to Dostoyevskism! Up with the cultural renaissance!"

He was just as critical of the Russian proletarian literature of the time, which he thought had substituted bureaucratic slogans and "all-Union Philistinism" for a genuine revolutionary attitude. Khvylovy was likewise dismissive of contemporary Ukrainian literature, which he condemned for lacking the "Faustian activist attitude" of an "inquisitive human spirit" characteristic of European civilization, but instead demonstrated "cultural epigonism" and "servile psychology," which produced "sluggish artists capable only of repeating what has already been done before, of aping".

These criticisms and insistence on Ukraine's separate identity put both Khvylovy and his like-minded colleagues in danger. In 1926 Joseph Stalin, by then the General Secretary of the Communist Party of the Soviet Union, wrote to the Secretary of the Ukrainian Communist Party:

"At a time when the proletarians of Western Europe and their Communist Parties are in sympathy with "Moscow", this citadel of the international revolutionary movement and of Leninism, at a time when the proletarians of Western Europe look with admiration at the flag that flies over Moscow, the Ukrainian Communist Khvilevoy has nothing better to say in favor of "Moscow" than to call on the Ukrainian leaders to get away from "Moscow" "as fast as possible". And that is called internationalism! What is to be said of other Ukrainian intellectuals, those of the non-communist camp, if Communists begin to talk, and not only to talk but even to write in our Soviet press, in the language of Khvylovy?"

Stalin's criticism triggered a campaign of denunciation of Khvylovy, who was singled out for criticism at the June 1926 Plenum of the Central Committee of the Ukrainian Communist Party, and Alexander Shumsky, a prominent political champion of Ukrainization. Yet while Khvylovy accepted the criticism and agreed to correct his errors, he continued to write critically about Ukraine's dependence on Russia, asking "Is Ukraine a colony or is it not?" His pamphlets and novels became subject to stricter censorship or, in some cases, suppressed entirely.

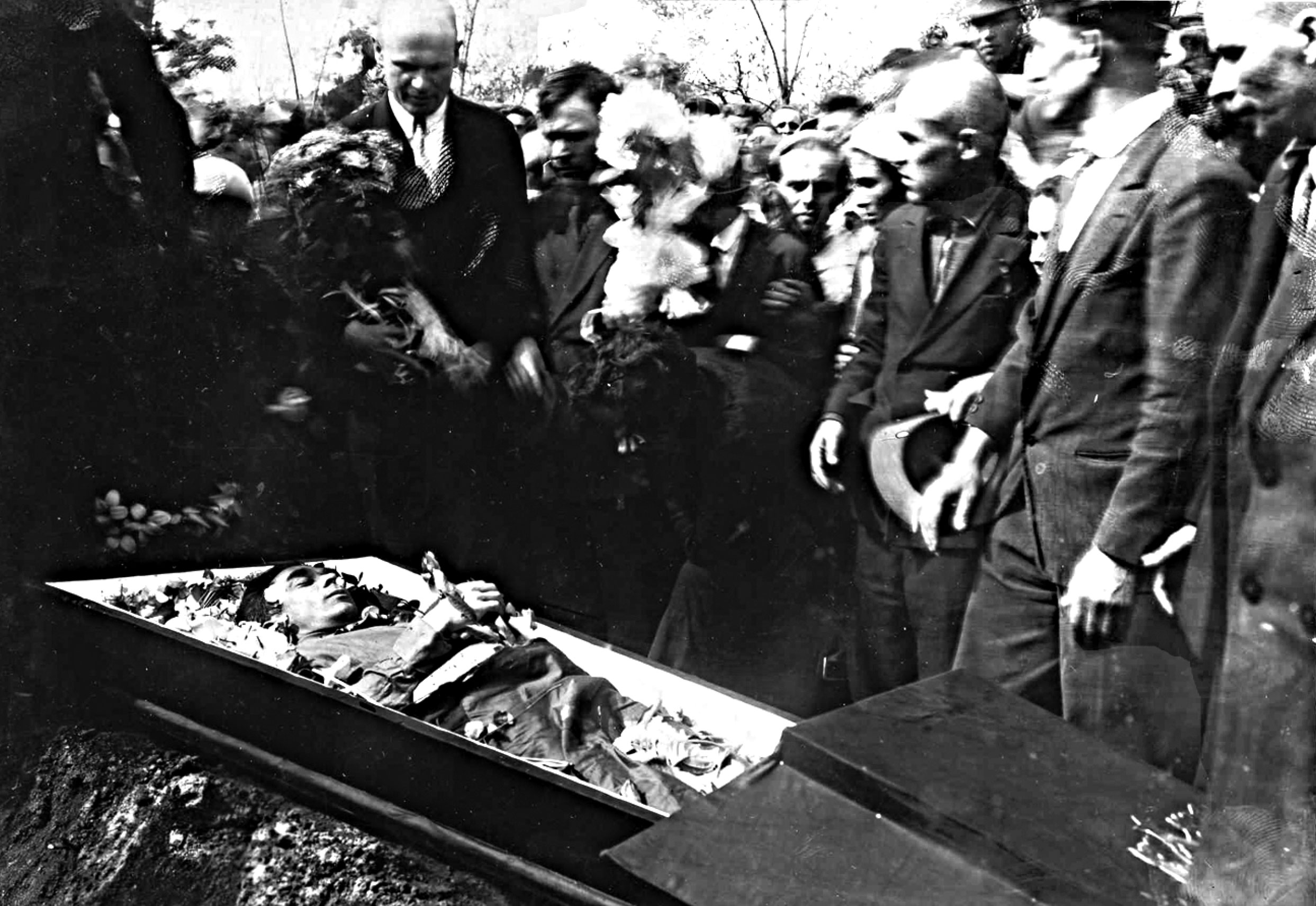
Funeral of Mykola Khvylovy. May 15, 1933

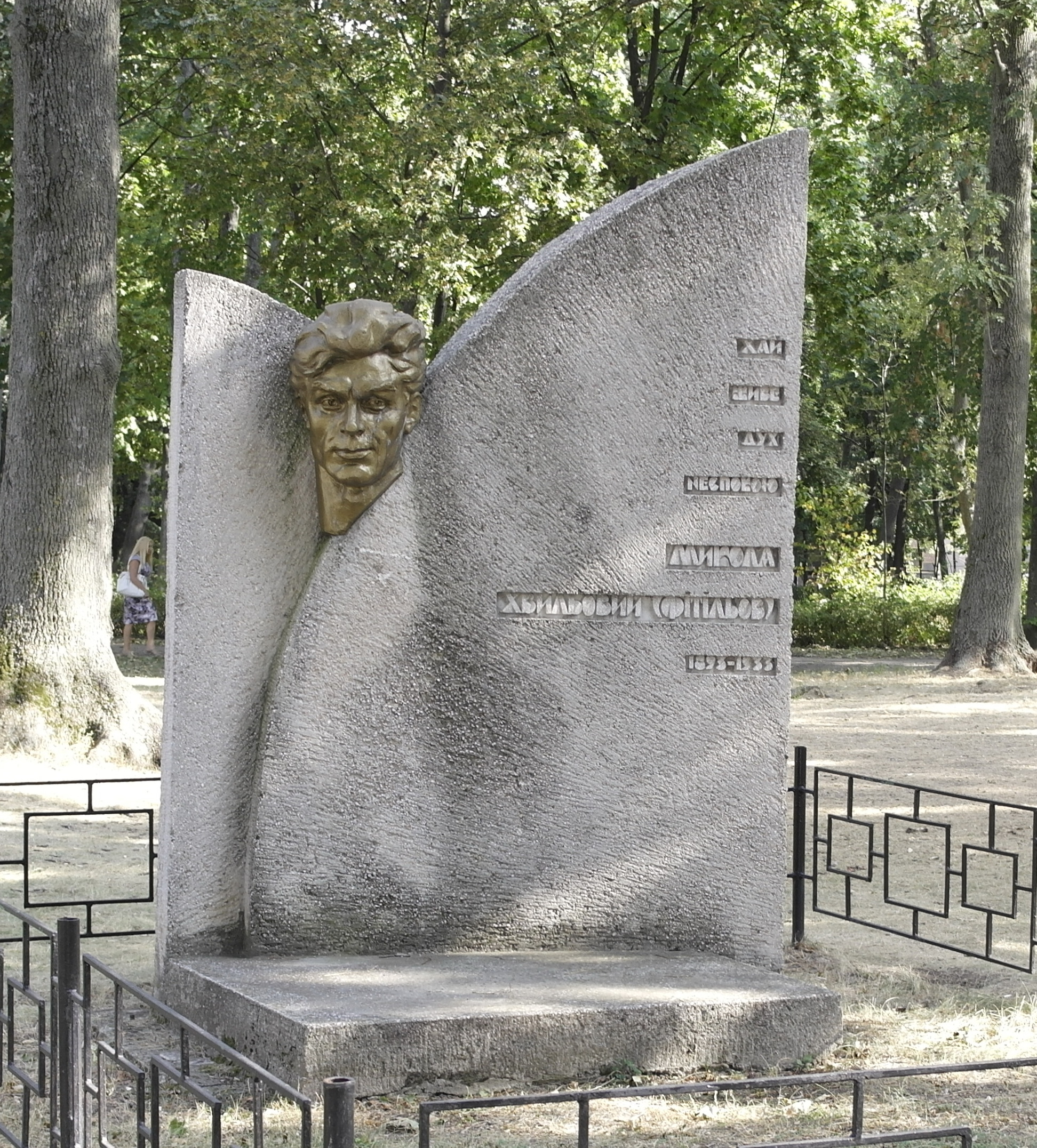
Grave of Mykola Khvylovy

At the same time VAPLITE, the literary movement he had helped found, was forced to dissolve. In its place Moscow created the All-Ukrainian Union of Proletarian Writers, or "VUSPP", which staunchly opposed Ukrainian cultural autonomy and favored proletarian literature designed to have mass appeal. Khvylovy tried to meet the challenge by creating another organization, Prolitfront, but it made so many concessions to the proletarian ethos and partisan ideology embodied by VUSPP that it ultimately lost any semblance of independence. It dissolved itself in 1931.

Khvylovy also changed his style to conform to the new standards of socialist realism, joining VUSPP and producing propaganda pieces for the Soviet regime. But the climate for any form of Ukrainian literature became grim, as Soviet authorities, in the midst of the Holodomor, required unqualified loyalty to the regime and eliminated those who had opposed it in the past. In April 1933 the secret police arrested Mykhailo Yalovy – former head of VAPLITE, closest companion and ally of Khvylovy. Yalovy was shot in Sandarmokh together with other luminaries of his generation such as Les Kurbas, Mykola Zerov, and Valerian Pidmohylny. 1111 prisoners were shot by the Soviets to mark the anniversary of the Bolshevik revolution.

Because of Stalin's repressions against his friends in the pro-Ukrainian Communist movement, Khvylovy committed suicide on 13 May 1933 in front of his friends in his apartment in Kharkiv. His suicide note said: "Arrest of Yalovy – this is the murder of an entire generation ... For what? Because we were the most sincere Communists? I don't understand. The responsibility for the actions of Yalovy's generation lies with me, Khvylovy. Today is a beautiful sunny day. I love life – you can't even imagine how much. Today is the 13th. Remember I was in love with this number? Terribly painful. Long live communism. Long live the socialist construction. Long live the Communist Party."

After his death, his works were banned in the Soviet Union and because of his symbolic potency were mostly not permitted until near the end or after the collapse of the Soviet Union.

== Works ==
Khvylovy wrote both poetry and short stories. His short stories are best known for their difficult narrative forms and complicated imagery.

A novel, titled Valdshnepy (The Woodsnipes), remained unfinished and unpublished when he died. Its second part — the first published in Vaplite in 1927 — had been confiscated.

He wrote a number of pamphlets presenting his views of the connection between politics and art. He advocated an orientation toward cultural trends in Western Europe in order to loosen Ukraine's dependence on Russian forms and inspiration, as he deemed excessive Russian influence on Ukrainian literature as something akin to colonialism. His pamphlets created a major controversy and divided representatives of the budding Ukrainian literary scene and created tensions with the authorities. In the second series, Dumky proty techyi (Thoughts against the Current), which appeared in Kul’tura i pobut in November–December 1925 and separately in 1926, Khvylovy further developed his argument against the "cult of epigonism". By adopting a psycho-intellectual orientation on Europe, he argued, Ukrainians can enter onto their own path of development.

Leaving aside poetry, from which the writer soon turned to prose, the work of M. Khvylovy following G. A. Kostyuk can be divided into three periods:

1921–1924 – the time of the experiment and the search, to which the plotless romantic, lyrical, everyday satirical studies and the stories “Life” (Zhyttya), “Puss in Boots” (Kit u Chobotyakh), “On the Deaf Road” (Na Hluhim Shlyakhu) belong, “Editor Kark” (Redaktor Kark), “Blue Leaf Fall” (Synii Lystopad), “Pig” (Svynia), “Arabesques” (Arabesky), the short story “I” and others.

1925–1930 – the period of creative maturity, the statement of style, theoretical understanding of art and a clear focus on the plot: the satirical stories “Ivan Ivanovich” and “The Examiner”, the socio-psychological novel “From Varya's Biography” (Iz Varynoï biografiï), the novel “Mother” (Maty), the story "Sanatorium zone" (The story about the sanatorium zone) and the novel "Woodcocks", polemic pamphlets "Kamo hryadeshy?", "Ukraine or Little Russia?" and so on.

1931–1933 – “the period of heroic patience”, the period of defeats, retreats, and recent attempts to find a place in the new emerging mainstream. A number of critics believe that after abandoning his views in penitential letters, Khvylovy ceased to exist as a writer. Then Khvylovy tried to rehabilitate himself in the eyes of the party leadership and dissociated himself from Khvylevism. The writer became entangled in a dangerous game and lost in a fight with the party leadership. Hopelessness led to a tragic ending. Dontsov believed that even if Khvylyovy himself pressed the trigger of the revolver, Moscow put the weapon in his hand. The last stage of his work includes “Hunting Stories” (Myslyvsky Opovidannya; the writer was an avid hunter), “From the Laboratory” (3 laborers), “Future Miners” (Maybutny Shakhtari), etc.

Preceded by Mykhailo Yalovy	Director of Chervony Shliach; 1927	Succeeded by Volodymyr Zatonsky
