= Mykhailo Yalovy =

Ukrainian poet, prose writer, and playwright (1895–1937)

Mykhailo Yalovy Михайло Омелянович Яловий
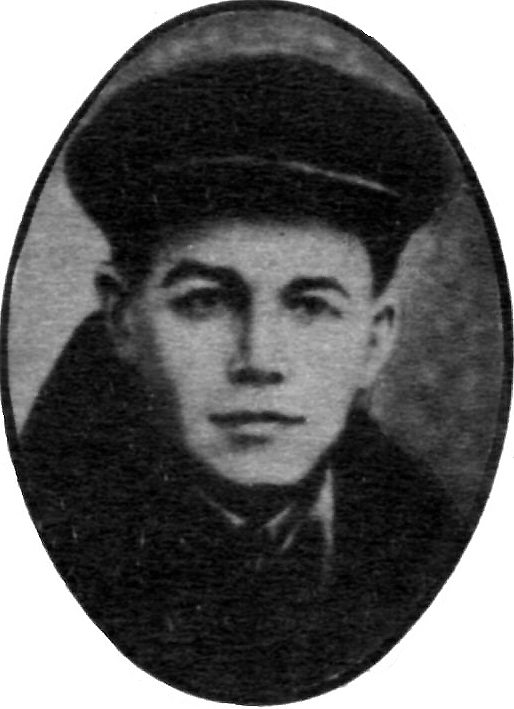
- Born: 5 June 1895; Kostiantynhrad uyezd, Poltava Governorate, Russian Empire
- Died: 3 November 1937 (aged 42); Svirlag OGPU, Lodeynoye Pole, USSR
- Occupations: poet, prose writer, playwright
- Writing career
- Pen name: Yulian Shpol
- Notable work: Golden fox-kits
- Literary movement: CPU(b), Hart, VAPLITE etc

Mykhailo Yalovy (Ukrainian: Михайло Омелянович Яловий) (5 June 1895 – 3 November 1937), also known under the pen name Yulian Shpol, was a Ukrainian communist poet-futurist, prose writer and playwright. He is considered to be one of the leading figures of the Executed Renaissance.

== Brief biography ==
=== Early years and the Revolution ===
Yalovy was born in 1895 in the village of Dar-Nadezhda, Kostiantynhrad uyezd, in the Poltava Governorate (today Kharkiv Oblast), into the family of a volost scribe. He had two brothers Kostiantyn and Hryhoriy. He obtained his general education in Myrhorod gymnasium in 1916. After that he enrolled in the Medical Department of the Kiev University of Saint Vladimir. There he completely dove into revolutionary activity, becoming a member of the socialist-revolutionaries ("Esery" or "SR"), one of the most influential parties of the time.

After the beginning of the February Revolution he returned to Kostiantynhrad (today Krasnohrad), where he headed a revolutionary committee. Later he was elected to the Executive Committee of the Kostiantynhrad Council of Workers' and Peasants' Deputies.

After the left wing of Esery split away in 1918 as a separate party of Borotbists he became their one of the most well-known members. He took an active part in the group's newspapers Borotba (Struggle) and Selianska bidnota (Poor peasantry), serving as director of the latter paper. About the same time he also worked as a chief editor of Peasant and Worker, the newspaper produced by the instructional-agitation train of the All-Ukrainian Central Executive Committee under the leadership of Grigory Petrovsky.

He conducted active underground work in Odessa and Kherson region, where he organized resistance against the German occupational forces and those loyal to the Second Hetmanate led by Hetman of Ukraine Pavlo Skoropadskyi. In 1919 he visited Halychyna as part of a Borotbist delegation.

=== Creative work and activism ===
In 1920 Yalovy joined the CPU(b). For some time he was located in Moscow as a representative of the Ukrainian government. In 1921, together with Mykahilo Symenko and Vasyl Aleshko, he created the Strike group of poet-futurists in Kharkiv. Together with Oleksa Slisarenko and Mykola Bazhan Yalovy became a member of Hart in 1925, later the same year with several members of Hart he created VAPLITE, becoming its president.

In 1926 Yalovy published an article Saint-Petersburg's kholuystvo (kholuystvo is a derogatory Russian word for ignorance) in the defense of the national Ukrainian culture that was triggered by another article of the Leningrad magazine Zhyzn isskustva (#14), Self-determination or chauvinism?. On 20 November 1926 he was dismissed, together with Mykola Khvylovy, from the editorial board of Chervony Shliakh by the order of the Politburo of the Central Committee of the Communist Party of Ukraine (bilshovyks). Later he, Dosvitny, and Khvyliovy left VAPLITE in order to save the organization, but in the end it was forced to dissolve.

=== Arrest and imprisonment ===
Mykhailo Yalovy was arrested on the night of 12–13 May 1933 during the search of his apartment by the agents of the CPU(b) of the Ukrainian SSR.

On 31 May 1933 he was expelled from the CPU(b) on the grounds that he had infiltrated its ranks with the aim of creating a counter-revolutionary fascist organization that had the goal of overthrowing the Soviet government. Yalovy was accused of spying for the Polish consulate, of Shumskism (support for Ukrainian autonomy and Ukrainizaton associated with Alexander Shumsky, and of preparing to assassinate Pavel Postyshev, the first secretary of the CPU(b). He refused to plead guilty to these crimes.

Yalovy was sentenced to ten years in labor camps (ITL, part of the GULAG).

=== Execution, burial and rehabilitation ===
A few years later, during the Great Purges, Yavlovy was summarily sentenced on 9 October 1937 at a session of the extrajudicial special NKVD troika of the Leningrad Oblast to be shot at one of the killing field-burial grounds in Karelia. The execution, a bullet to the back of the head in front of an already dug trench, took place a few weeks later on 3 November 1937 in Svirlag OGPU (Lodeynoye Pole). New data indicate that Yavlovy's final resting place may be among the thousands shot and buried at Sandarmokh near Medvezhyegorsk.

After Stalin's death, Yavlovy and the many thousands of other victims condemned to death by the extrajudicial troikas were rehabilitated. On 19 June 1957, the conviction was annulled by the Military tribunal of the Leningrad Military District (LVO) due to the "lack of a crime".

In December 2022 the Fyodor Tolbukhin lane in Kyiv, Ukraine was renamed to Mykhailo Yalovy lane.

== See also ==
- Chervony Shliakh

== Works ==
- Need to be chewed out. — 1920.
- (Collection of poetry) Tops. — Kyiv—Moscow—Berlin: Golfshtrem, 1923.
- (Comedy) Cathy's love, or construction propaganda. — Kharkiv, 1928.
- (Novel) Golden Fox-kits. — Kharkiv: Knyhospilka, 1929. (II ed. — Kharkiv: Knyhospilka, 1930.)
- Selected works / Organization, foreword, footnotes, and commentaries of Oleksandr Ushlakov. — Kyiv: Smoloskyp, 2007. (ISBN 966-8499-46-8)

== Bibliography ==
- Encyclopedia of Ukrainian Studies (10 volumes) / Chief editor Volodymyr Kubiyovych. — Paris, New-York: Molode Zhyttia, 1954–1989.
- Maystrenko, Ivan. History of my generation. Memoirs of a participant of revolutionary activities in Ukraine. — Edmonton, 1985.
- Ushlakov, Oleksandr. Greetings, Yulian Shpol! («Драстуй, Юліане Шпол!») // Yulian Shpol. Selected works. — Kyiv: Smoloskyp, 2007.
