= Volodymyr Sosiura =

Ukrainian poet (1898–1965)

- Володимир Сосюра
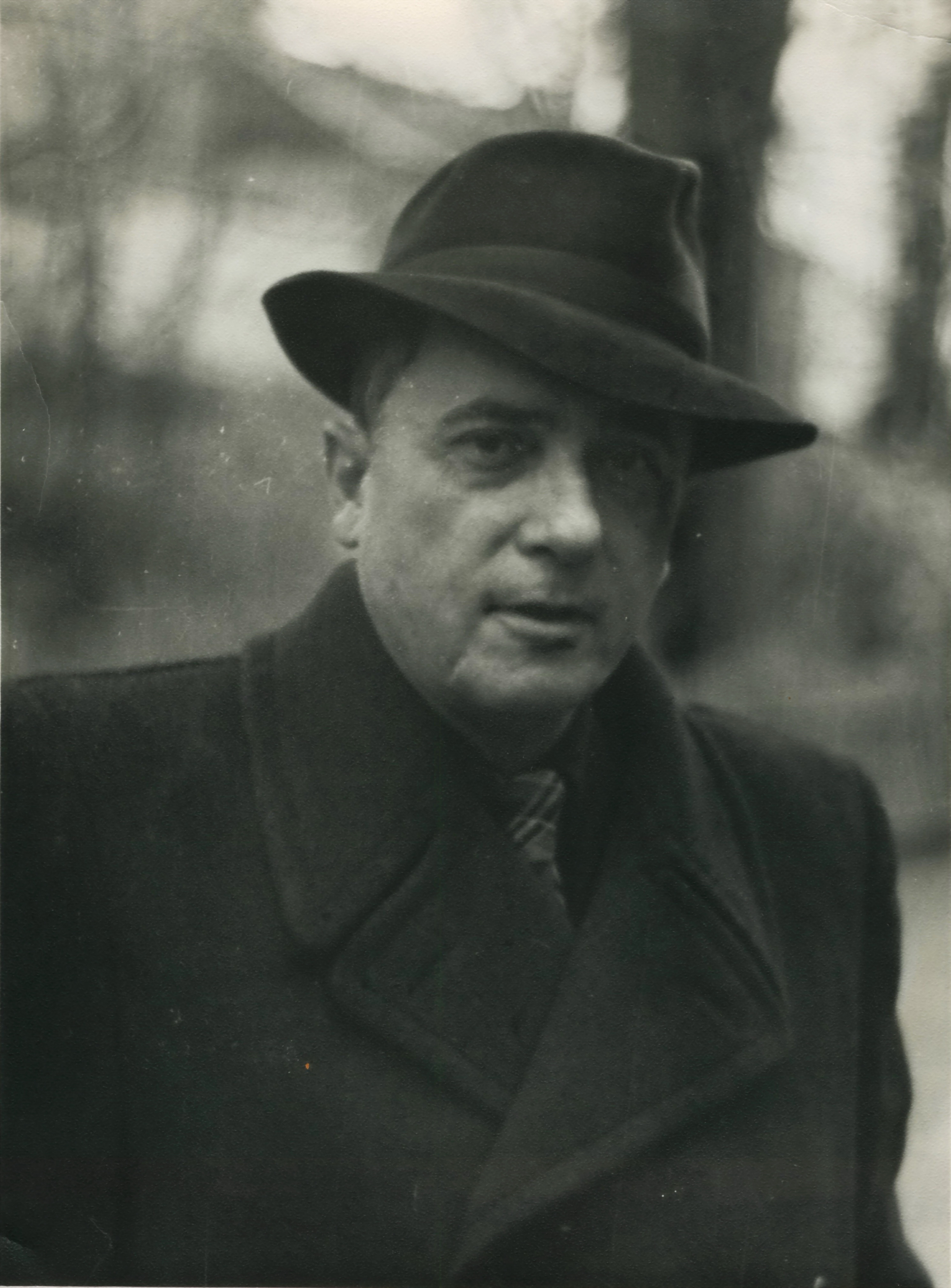
- Sosiura in 1956
- Born: 6 January 1898; Debaltseve, Yekaterinoslav Governorate, Russian Empire
- Died: 8 January 1965 (aged 67); Kyiv, Ukrainian SSR, Soviet Union
- Occupations: Poet, translator, journalist, war correspondent
- Spouse: Maria
- Writing career
- Language: Ukrainian
- Notable works: Love Ukraine (Любіть Україну), To Maria, Stalin etc
- Notable awards: Stalin Prize, 1st class (1948); Shevchenko Prize (1963)
- Movements: CPU(b), Ukrainian Proletarian Writers, VAPLITE etc

Volodymyr Mykolaiovych Sosiura (Ukrainian: Володимир Миколайович Сосюра; 6 January 1898 – 8 January 1965) was a Ukrainian poet, translator, journalist, war correspondent and a veteran of Ukrainian–Soviet War.

== Early life ==
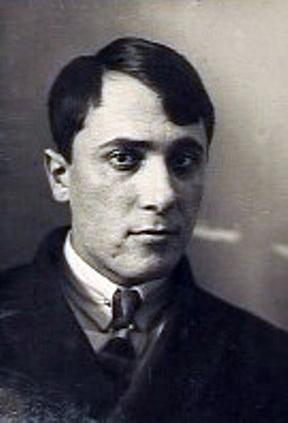
Sosiura in the 1920s

Volodymyr Sosiura was born on 6 January 1898 in a settlement within Debaltseve railway station (today the city of Debaltseve). His father, Mykola Volodymyrovych, worked in a variety of jobs and was of French heritage. Mykola's family was from the De Saussure lineage in Provence, until Volodymyr's grandfather, who was a soldier in Napoleon's army, ended up in the Russian Empire and the family's last name was changed to "Sosiura" by local scribes. His mother, Dmytrivna Lokotosh, was of Hungarian and Serbian descent. Dmytrivna's great-grandfather was of Serbian origin and, as the surname suggests, also Hungarian, since Lokotosh is extremely common in the Hungarian population of Zakarpattia where the family probably lived before moving to Luhansk and then later the modern-day Donetsk Oblast.

Volodymyr while growing up in Debaltseve, was educated by his father for his primary years, but was unable to obtain secondary schooling for some time because of the need for money in the family, so he initially started working in cooperage shops and as a telephone operator. In 1909, he started working at the Donets Soda Factory (also known as the "Third Company") in the settlement Verkhnee (today part of Lysychansk) where he worked for couple of years. In 1914–1918 he studied in an agricultural school (uchilische) in a settlement of Yama train station (today Siversk). In 1918, Sosiura was a member of the Donets Soda Factory insurgent workers group.

== Russian Civil War ==
Sosiura fought in Petliura's Ukrainian People's Army, first in the Bakhmut District Security Guarg as a voluntter, then the 3rd Haidamaka Regiment that was quartered in Bakhmut under Captain Zubko-Mokievsky during the winter of 1918 to the autumn of 1919. While stationed in Bakhmut, he also wrote his first Ukrainian poems in the youth magazine Vilni Dumky (Free Thoughts), entitled "Is It Not Time..." and "Evening". However, most of his frontline work with the UNR has not survived, such as his known connection Songs of Blood which was published in Proskuriv (now Khmelnytskyi). In autumn 1919, he was taken prisoner by Denikin's Volunteer Army. He was sentenced to death by shooting, but he survived because the wound turned out to be non-fatal and managed to escape. By late 1919, he started retreating with the UPR westward towards Podolia, and was stationed in the temporary capital of the UPR, Kamianets-Podilskyi. He was assigned to guard duty at the Osavulova mansion, which was the residence of the Main Directorate of the UPR and Petliura. Later, after the UPR was overrun, he joined the Red Army in Odesa in 1920. As part of the Red Army, he participated in battles against Nestor Makhno's forces and in the Polish–Soviet War.

His poetry from the frontlines has often been described as dualist and controversial, with a struggle between the Ukrainian patriot and coerced Soviet poet. His poem Red Winter from 1921, during his time with the Red Army, was long celebrated in Soviet history as the tale of a devoted Red Army soldier and became a Bolshevik anthem, although Sosiura himself contradicts this in his autobiography and implies the scenes in the poem were from his time as a volunteer in the UNR. However, he still replaces his haydamak in the poem for a budenovka, which effectively rewrote his Ukrainian cause into a revolutionary communism one, regardless if it was to escape imprisonment.

== Career ==
After the Russian Civil War in Ukraine ended (see Ukraine after the Russian Revolution), he moved to Kharkiv and was appointed press secretary of Agitprop. He then studied at the Artem Communist University in Kharkiv from 1922 to 1923, then at the workers' faculty of the Public Education Institute (Kharkiv) from 1923 to 1925. Sosiura belonged to the Ukrainian literary organizations Pluh, Hart, VAPLITE, and the All-Ukrainian Association of Proletarian Writers.

In the 1920s–30s Sosiura became very popular, but his ideological loyalties were torn between patriotic feelings for Ukraine and those for the Soviet Union and its often-changing ideologies. Even though he had long been a member of the CPU(b), he was frequently in conflict with it, and was twice expelled for "nationalistic undertones," he was even forced to undergo a "reeducation" at a factory in 1930–1931. Many of Sosiura's poems were not published. He was reinstated into the CPU(b) in 1940 after writing a personal letter to Joseph Stalin.

During World War II, he participated in writer's agitation groups, and published war poems such as Lst do zemliakiv ("Letter to Compatriots"), which was distributed as a leaflet across Ukraine. In 1942, he moved to Moscow and started working for the Ukrainian Radio Committee and the Ukrainian Partisan Headquarters. In 1942, the Central Committee reassigned him to the Political Directorate of the fronts for the Ukrainian SSR, and he started working as a war correspondent for Za chest Batkivshchyny ("For the Honor of the Motherland"). In 1944, he wrote his famous poem "Love Ukraine" (Любіть Україну), which was published on 16 May 1944 in Kyivska Pravda and Literatura ta Mystetstvo, and was initially very warmly received.

In 1948 he was awarded the highest honors of the Stalin Prize, but then he came under harsh criticism for his poem entitled Love Ukraine, which was deemed too nationalistic in its tone by several Soviet news-media including Pravda. Following a meeting with First Secretary of the Ukrainian SSR, Lazyr Melnikov, in July 1951 Sosiura was forced to publish a public "letter of repentance" in Pravda. During the scandal, he was publicly denounced by many prominent Ukrainian writers such as Andriy Malyshko and Oleksandr Korniychuk, which Sosiura later said he believed was due to them wanting to deflect suspicion from themselves. However, as he later learned, Nikita Khrushchev (who was previously First Secretary of the Ukrainian SSR), defended him, which prevented his arrest or execution. It was not until 1953, after Stalin's death, that most people who had publicly renounced him retracted their statements. In 1963, he won the Shevchenko Prize for Swallows on the Sun and Happiness of a Working Family.

== Personal life ==
His second wife, Maria Danylova, was secretly a KGB agent under the codename "Danina" started in 1941, where she was assigned to report on the activities of Ukrainian writers. In 1949, she was arrested for "disclosing state secrets" and sentenced to 10 years in a labor camp by the NKVD. While she was imprisoned, Sosiura was not made aware of where she was held, and so he married a third time but promptly divorced his third wife after Maria appealed her sentencing following Stalin's death.

Sosiura died in Kyiv at the age of 67.

== Works ==
His works include numerous poems that vary from the patriotic genre to love poems such as Love Ukraine, The Late Summer (Babyne Lito), To Maria, Stalin, and many others.

== Legacy ==
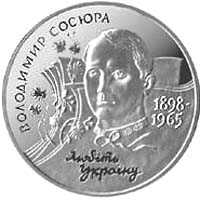
Two Hryvnia coin

His portrait and title of his poem, Love Ukraine, are featured on a two Hryvnia collectible coin.

Ukrainian composer Yudif Rozhavskaya used Sosiura's text for her songs.
