= Chervonyi Shliakh =

Ukrainian periodical (1923–1936)

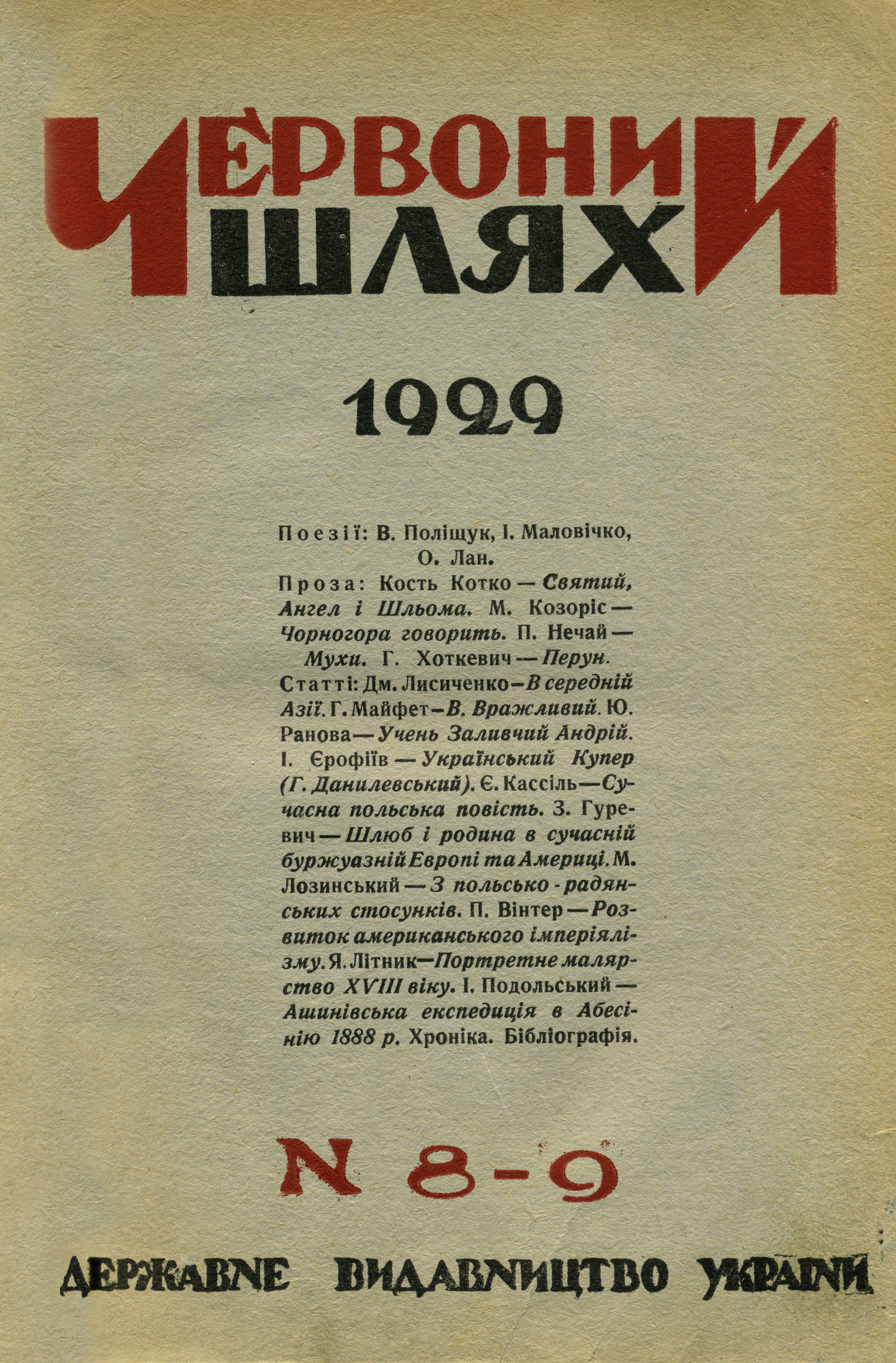
Title page of 1929

Chervonyi Shliach (Ukrainian: Черво́ний шлях) was a political and literary-scientific monthly that was founded in 1923 in Kharkiv, Ukraine. It continued to be published until February 1936.

The first directors of the magazine were prominent Ukrainian statesmen, Hryhoriy Hrynko, who was replaced, due to his transfer to Moscow sometime in mid 1923, by Oleksandr Shumsky. Shumsky was fired from the position as well as the position of People's Commissar of Education in 1926 for nationalistic deviation.

For a short period of time the position of director was given to Mykhailo Yalovy and Mykola Khvylovy, who were eventually displaced for nationalistic deviations. In 1927 the magazine was headed by Volodymyr Zatonsky.

The magazine published the work of major Ukrainian writers and journalists such as Ivan Kulyk, Pavlo Tychyna, Pavlo Khrystiuk, Mykola Skrypnyk, V. Yurynets, and many others.

During the 1920s the magazine published works representative of a variety of political orientations and fields of literature, art, journalism, history, economy, etc. The magazine reflected on its pages both the weak and strong in the processes of Ukrainian cultural Renaissance of the time.

The closing down of the magazine Chervonyi Shliakh was one of the last acts for the liquidation of a pluralistic cultural understanding. It was succeeded by the Literary Journal, which became a voice for socialist realism.

== Sources ==
- Encyclopedia of Ukraine
