= Kolontayevka, Kursk Oblast =

Rural locality in Kursk Oblast, Russia

Kolontayevka Колонтаевка
- Settlement
- Interactive map of Kolontayevka
- Location of Kolontayevka Kolontayevka (Kursk Oblast)
- Coordinates: 51°34′00″N 35°07′38″E
- Country: Russia
- Federal subject: Kursk Oblast
- Administrative district: Lgovsky District
- SelsovietSelsoviet: Gustomoysky

Population (2010 Census)
  - Total: 358
  - Estimate (2010): 358 (0%)

Municipal status
  - Municipal district: Lgovsky Municipal District
  - Rural settlement: Gustomoysky Selsoviet Rural Settlement
- Time zone: UTC+3 (MSK)
- Postal code: 307740
- Dialing code: +7 47140
- OKTMO ID: 38622424166
- Website: gustomoy.rkursk.ru

Kolontayevka (Russian: Колонтаевка) is a rural locality (a settlement) in Gustomoysky Selsoviet Rural Settlement, Lgovsky District, Kursk Oblast, Russia. Population: 358 (2010 census); 573 (2002 census);

== Geography ==
The settlement is located 37 km from the Russia–Ukraine border, 76 km south-west of Kursk, 12 km south-west of the district center – the town Lgov, 8 km from the selsoviet center – Gustomoy.

Climate

Kolontayevka has a warm-summer humid continental climate (Dfb in the Köppen climate classification).

Climate data for Kolontayevka
Month	Jan	Feb	Mar	Apr	May	Jun	Jul	Aug	Sep	Oct	Nov	Dec	Year
Mean daily maximum °C (°F)	−3.7 (25.3)	−2.7 (27.1)	3.3 (37.9)	13.3 (55.9)	19.5 (67.1)	22.7 (72.9)	25.2 (77.4)	24.6 (76.3)	18.3 (64.9)	10.7 (51.3)	3.7 (38.7)	−0.9 (30.4)	11.2 (52.1)
Daily mean °C (°F)	−5.8 (21.6)	−5.2 (22.6)	−0.3 (31.5)	8.4 (47.1)	14.8 (58.6)	18.4 (65.1)	20.9 (69.6)	20 (68)	14.1 (57.4)	7.4 (45.3)	1.4 (34.5)	−2.8 (27.0)	7.6 (45.7)
Mean daily minimum °C (°F)	−8.2 (17.2)	−8.3 (17.1)	−4.4 (24.1)	2.9 (37.2)	9.2 (48.6)	13.1 (55.6)	15.8 (60.4)	14.8 (58.6)	9.8 (49.6)	4.1 (39.4)	−0.9 (30.4)	−5 (23)	3.6 (38.4)
Average precipitation mm (inches)	51 (2.0)	44 (1.7)	48 (1.9)	50 (2.0)	63 (2.5)	71 (2.8)	76 (3.0)	53 (2.1)	57 (2.2)	57 (2.2)	47 (1.9)	49 (1.9)	666 (26.2)
Source: https://en.climate-data.org/asia/russian-federation/kursk-oblast/kolontaevka-317695/

== Transport ==
Kolontayevka is located 7 km from the road of regional importance 38K-017 (Kursk – Lgov – Rylsk – border with Ukraine) as part of the European route E38, on the road of intermunicipal significance 38H-112 (Ivanovskoye – Kolontayevka). There is a railway halt Kolontayevka (railway line 322 km – Lgov I).

The rural locality is situated 83 km from Kursk Vostochny Airport, 143 km from Belgorod International Airport and 285 km from Voronezh Peter the Great Airport.
