= Petro Panch =

Ukrainian writer (1891–1978)

- Петро Панч
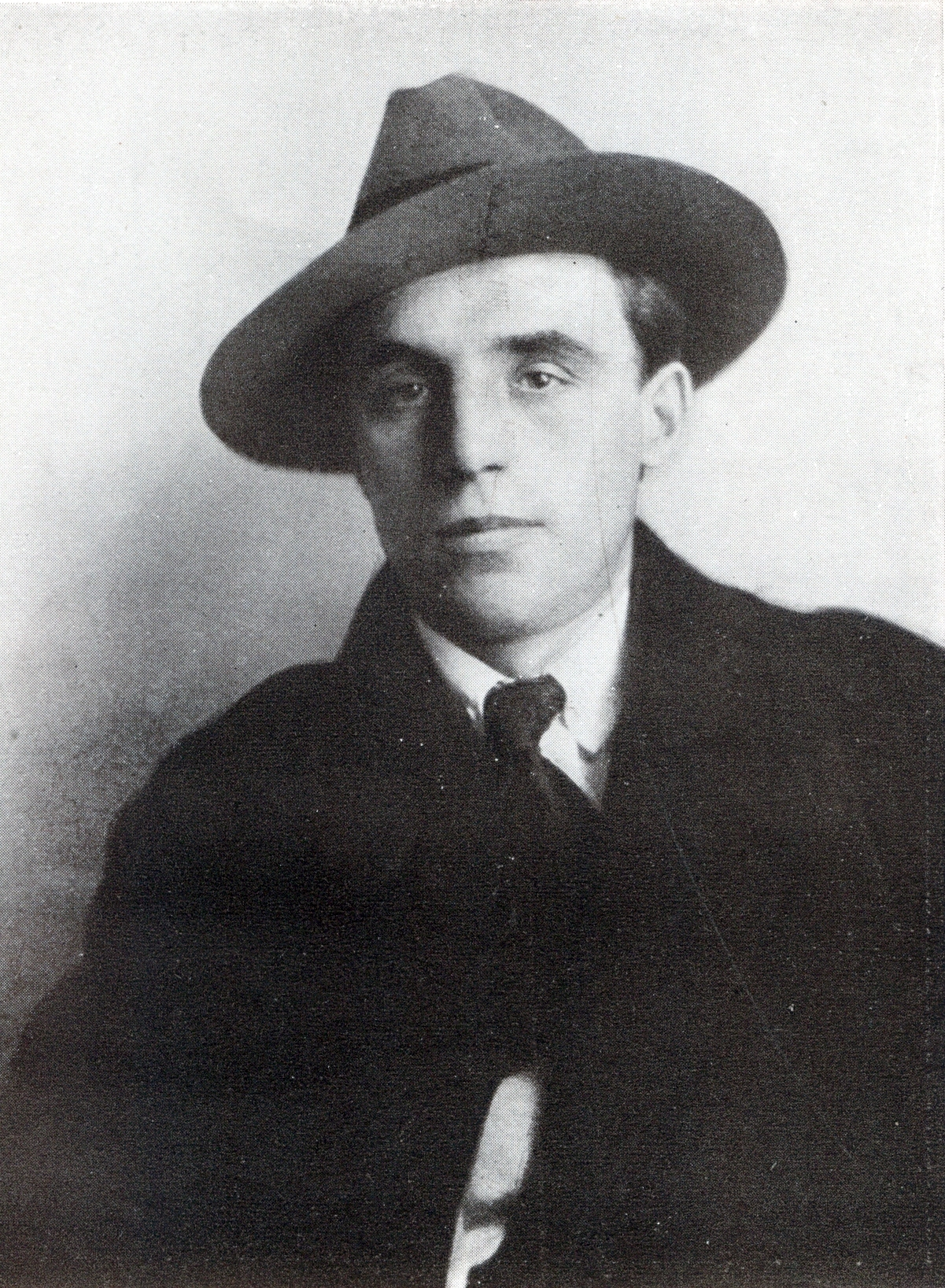
- Born: Petro Yosypovych Panchenko; 4 July 1891; Valky, Russian Empire
- Died: 1 December 1978 (aged 87); Kyiv, Ukrainian SSR, Soviet Union
- Occupations: Writer, playwright
- Writing career
- Notable awards: Shevchenko Prize (1966)

Petro Yosypovych Panch (Ukrainian: Петро Йосипович Панч; born 4 July [O.S. 22 June] 1891 in Valky, Russian Empire – died 1 December 1978 in Kyiv, Ukrainian SSR, Soviet Union) was a Ukrainian writer and playwright, one of founders of the Ukrainian Soviet literature. Member of the Soviet Writers' Union and the Writer's Union of Ukraine, former sotnik of the Ukrainian People's Army.
