= The Executed Renaissance =

1959 Ukrainian poetry and prose anthology

The Executed Renaissance, An Anthology, 1917–1933
- Editor: Yurii Lavrinenko
- Original title: Розстріляне відродження: Антологія 1917—1933
- Language: Ukrainian
- Genre: anthology
- Publisher: Kultura, Smoloskyp
- Publication date: 1959
- Publication place: France

The Executed Renaissance, An Anthology, 1917–1933: Poetry, prose, drama and essay (Ukrainian: «Розстріляне відродження: Антологія 1917—1933: Поезія—проза—драма—есей») is an anthology of works by Ukrainian poets and prosaists of the 1920s and 1930s. The term's origin is attributed to the Ukrainian émigré and literary critic Yuriy Lavrinenko, who published the anthology in 1959 in Paris with the support of Jerzy Giedroyc, a Polish writer and activist.

The anthology itself is based on the idea of the "Executed Renaissance," which Giedroyc coined to describe the hundreds of writers—both Ukrainian literati and intellectuals—who were arrested and executed under Joseph Stalin. This cultural elite became a target during the Great Terror (August 1937 to November 1938) because they were in a position to expose oppression and betrayal and could quickly become the targets of treason themselves. During the 1917 Revolution, the works of the poets were popular features and rallying chants. The body of literature was also recognized for its contribution to the emergence of the modern Ukrainian national idea.

== The history of publication ==
Lavrinenko was recommended to Giedroyc by Yurii Shevelov as a suitable compiler of an anthology of Ukrainian literature of the 1920s and 1930s.

The book appeared in the library of the Parisian magazine Kultura in 1959. The term "Executed Renaissance" is attributed to Giedroyc. It was first suggested as a title for the collection in a letter from Giedroyc to Shevelov dated 13 August 1958:

"And what about the name. It would be better to give as a common name The Executed Renaissance, An Anthology (1917–1933) etc. Such a name would have an effective sound. On the other hand, the humble title Anthology could only take the sting out of its promotion through the Iron Curtain. What do you think?"

After publication, Giedroyc sent copies, at the publisher's expense, to the Ukrainian Writers' Union in Kyiv and to magazines in the Ukrainian SSR. He used the ability of Kultura (legal or not) to send books through the Iron Curtain. After the anthology appeared, the term "Executed Renaissance" gained widespread notoriety in Ukrainian public language.

Materials for the anthology were taken from contemporary periodicals, libraries and archives, such as the Archive-Museum of the Ukrainian Free Academy of Sciences, the New York Public Library's Department of Slavic Studies, and from private collections (Sviatoslav Hordynsky, Hryhorii Kostiuk, Volodymyr Miakovsky, Yosyp Hirniak, Oksana Burevii and others), and from handwritten copies. In addition, Shevelov, Leonid Lyman, Ivan Koshelivets, Vasyl Barka, Vasyl Hryshko, Yar Slavutych and others helped to track down materials and offered advice.

== Structure of anthology ==
Ina preface to the edition, Lavrinenko, its editor, wrote about principium and the technique of choosing:

In this collected edition appeared only material, which had been publishing (rarely — only wrote) in Ukraine — mainly in USSR — for period 1917—1933 and which had banned and destroyed after 1933 due to new Moscow's course and turning Ukraine into colonial province.

Lavrinenko noted that part of the banned works had been printed during the occupation of Eastern Ukraine—between 1939 and 1946 and between 1956 and 1958—but it contained some corrections. The main principum was "to give only works, which had withdrawn after Moscow's terroristic and famine crack-downs on Ukraine." Works that were written in emigration were not represented because "this is anthology of works, which was in UkrSSR before 1933."

The anthology consists of four chapters: poetry, prose, drama and essay. Poetry was represented most fully: Firstly, because it "was in vanguard of contemporary literature;" and secondly, because "it is unpossible to cover even the most important examples of prose, drama and essay." Authors were placed «"n order of appearance of their first book after 1917."

=== Poetry ===
- Pavlo Tychyna — poems from collections «Sun Clarnets» (Ukrainian: Сонячні кларнети), «Instead of Sonnets and Octaves» (Ukrainian: Замість сонетів і октав), «Plough» (Ukrainian: Плуг), «A Wind from Ukraine» (Ukrainian: Вітер з України), «In the Cosmic Orchestra» (Ukrainian: У космічному оркестрі), poems «To the Memory of Thirty» (Ukrainian: Пам'яті тридцяти; published in Nova Rada, 1918), «From the Crimean Cycle» (dedicated to M. Rylsky) (Ukrainian: З кримського циклу; «The Life and the Revolution», 1926), «Mother peeled potato...» (Ukrainian: Чистила мати картоплю...; almanac «Vaplite», 1926)
- Maksym Rylsky — poems from collections «Under Autumn Stars» (Ukrainian: Під осінніми зорями), «A Blue Distance» (Ukrainian: Синя далечінь), «Poems» (Ukrainian: Поеми), «Through the Windstorm and Snow» (Ukrainian: Крізь бурю і сніг), «Thirteenth Spring» (Ukrainian: Тринадцята весна), «Where Roads Cross» (Ukrainian: Де сходяться дороги), «The Sound and the Echo» (Ukrainian: Гомін і відгомін); translation of preface of Adam Mickiewicz's «Pan Tadeusz»
- Yakiv Savchenko — poems «He Will Come on Mad Horse at the Night»(Ukrainian: Він вночі прилетить на шаленім коні…; «Poetry», 1918), «He Stands as a Wax and Cries Mournfull...» (Ukrainian: Стоїть. Як віск. І скорбно плаче…; Bohdan Kravtsiv's anthology «Strings, Putted Down», 1955), «A Sun Under Heads» (Ukrainian: Сонце під голови; Yar Slavutych's martyrology «The Executed Muse», 1955)
- Dmytro Zahul — poems «On the Other Side of Impenetrable Cover» (Ukrainian: За непроглядною заслоною; Literature and Science Herald, 1919), I am Listening a Song as through a Dream... (Ukrainian: Я чую пісню, мов крізь сон...; Bohdan Kravtsiv's anthology «Strings, Putted Down», 1955)
- Mykhayl Semenko — poems «Bronze Body» (Ukrainian: Бронзове тіло), «Conductor» (Ukrainian: Кондуктор), «Ocean» (Ukrainian: Океан) («Strings, Putted Down», 1955), «Unavoidable Days» (Ukrainian: Дні неминучі; «Piero peacocks», 1918)
- Oleksa Slisarenko — poems «Walt Whitman» (Ukrainian: Волт Вітмен), «In the Apiary» (Ukrainian: На пасіці)(«Strings, Putted Down», 1955), «To the Memory of Hnat Mykhailychenko» (Ukrainian: Пам'яті Гната Михайличенка; «An Alarm», 1921), «A Rime» (Ukrainian: Іней; «Vaplite», 1927)
- Mykola Zerov — poems from collections «Camenae» (Ukrainian: Камени, 1924) and «Sonnetarium» (1948) and single poem «HOI TRIAKONTA» (Yurii Klen (Oswald Burghardt) «Remembrance about Neoclassіcists», 1947)
- Vasyl Chumak
- Maik Yohansen
- Volodymyr Sosiura
- Volodymyr Svidzynsky
- Pavlo Phylypovych
- Todosii Osmachka
- Geo Shkurupii
- Dmytro Phalkivsky
- Vasyl Bobynsky
- Mykhailo Drai-Khmara
- Yevhen Pluzhnyk
- Leonid Chernov (Maloshyichenko)
- Stepan Ben
- Mykola Bazhan
- Marko Vorony
- Vasyl Mysyk
- Oleksa Vlyzko
- Kost Burevii (Eduard Strikha)

=== Prose ===
- Mykola Khvylovy — «Editor Kark» (Ukrainian: Редактор Карк), «I am (A Romantic)» (Ukrainian: Я (Романтика))
- Valerian Pidmohylny — «Ivan Bosy» (Ukrainian: Іван Босий)
- Hryhorii Kosynka — «A Form» (Ukrainian: Анкета; fragment)
- Ivan Senchenko — «From Kholui's Notes» (Ukrainian: Із записок Холуя)
- Borys Antonenko-Davydovych — «A Death» (Ukrainian: Смерть)
- Yurii Yanovsky — «Four Swords» (Ukrainian: Чотири шаблі)
- Ostap Vyshnia — «My Autobiography» (Ukrainian: Моя автобіографія; sic!), «Chukren» (Ukrainian: Чукрен), «Chukhrainians» (Ukrainian: Чухраїнці), «Something from Ukrainian Studies» (Ukrainian: Дещо з українознавства)

=== Drama ===
- Mykola Kulish — «People's Malachii» (Ukrainian: Народний Малахій; appeared in Stanislav Hordynsky's «Real People's Malachii» (Ukrainian: Справжній народний Малахій), 1953)
- Kost Burevii — historic drama «Pavlo Polubotok» in five acts (Ukrainian: Павло Полуботок; Kost Burevii «Pavlo Polubotok», 1948)

=== Essay ===
- Andrii Nikovsky — «Vita nova» (fragments; 1929)
- Yurii Mezhenko — «The Individuum's Creativity and the Collective» (Ukrainian: Творчість індивідуума і колектив; fragments; «Muzahet», 1919), «A VAPLITE's Proclamation» (Ukrainian: Відозва ВАПЛІТЕ; saved in Apkadii Liubchenko's archive)
- Mykola Khvylovy — fragments from pamphlets «Quo Vadis» (Ukrainian: Камо грядеши), «Upstream Thoughts» (Ukrainian: Думки проти течії) (appendix of «News of VUTsVK» «Culture and Life», 1925), «Apologists of Pysarism» (Ukrainian: Апологети писаризму) («Culture and Life», 1926), «Ukraine or Little Russia?» (Ukrainian: Україна чи Малоросія?; Andrii Khvylia «From the Flank — to the Abyss», 1928)
- Mykola Zerov — «Eurasian Renaissance and Poshekhonye Pines» (Ukrainian: Евразійський ренесанс і пошехонські сосни)(«Culture and Life», 1926)
- Volodymyr Yurynets — «Dialogs» (Ukrainian: Діялоги; Interludes to 135th book of «Literature Fair», briefly) («Literature Fair», 1929)
- Oleksander Dovzhenko — «To the Problem of Visual Arts» (Ukrainian: До проблеми образотворчого мистецтва; «Vaplite», 1926)
- Les Kurbas — «Ways of „Berezil”» (Ukrainian: Шляхи «Березоля»; «Vaplite», 1927)
- Mykhailo Hrushevsky — «In Shameful Memory» (Ukrainian: Ганебній пам'яті; «Ukraine», 1926)

== See also ==
- Executed Renaissance (the shooting of Ukrainian writers, poets, artists and dramatists)
- List of Ukrainian-language poets
- List of Ukrainian-language writers
- Ukrainian literature

== Literature ==
- О.С. Рубльов. Енциклопедія історії України : у 10 т. / редкол.: В. А. Смолій (голова) та ін.; Інститут історії України НАН України. — К. : Наук. думка, 2012. — Т. 9 : Прил — С. — С. 265. — ISBN 978-966-00-1290-5.

== Bibliography ==
- Лавріненко Ю. А. Розстріляне відродження: Антологія 1917—1933: Поезія — проза — драма — есей / Підгот. тексту, фахове редагування і передм. проф. Наєнка М. К. — К.: Вид. центр «Просвіта», 2001. — 794 с.
- Розстріляне відродження: Антологія 1917 — 1933: Поезія — проза — драма — есей / Упорядкув., передм., післям. — Ю. Лавріненка.; Післямова Є. Сверстюка. — К.: Смолоскип, 2008. — 976 с.: портр.
- Простір свободи. Україна на шпальтах паризької «Культури». Підготувала Богуміла Бердиховська. К.: Критика — 2005 р., 528 с.
- Єжи Ґедройць — українська еміґрація. Листування 1952—1982 років. Упорядкування, переднє слово і коментарі Боґуміли Бердиховської. — Київ: Критика, 2008 (див. листування з Юрієм Лавріненком у справі підготовки антології «Розстріляне відродження»)
