= Todos Osmachka =

Ukrainian writer and poet (1895–1962)

- Тодось Осьмачка
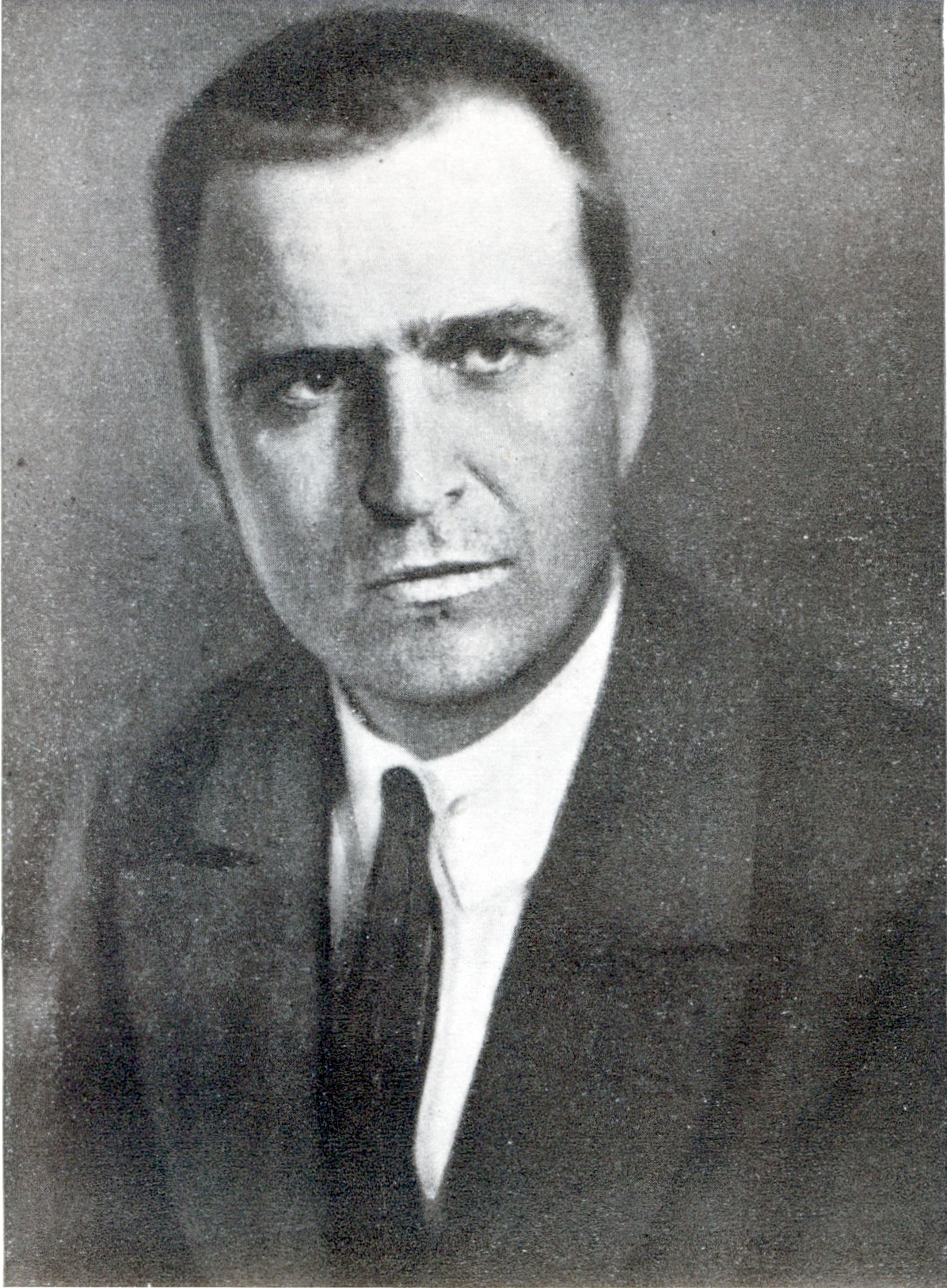
- Osmachka in 1928
- Born: Теодосій Степанович Осьмачка; Teodosiy Stepanovych Osmachka; 16 May [O.S. 4 May] 1895; Kutsivka, Cherkassy uezd, Kiev Governorate, Russian Empire (now Ukraine)
- Died: 7 September 1962 (aged 67); Brentwood, Suffolk County, New York, USA
- Resting place: St. Andrew Ukrainian Orthodox Cemetery
- Education: Kyiv Institute of Public Education, 1925
- Occupations: Poet; writer; translator

Signature
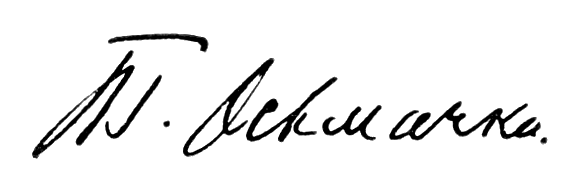

Teodosiy Stepanovych Osmachka (Ukrainian: Теодосій Степанович Осьмачка; 16 May [O.S. 4 May] 1895 – 7 September 1962), known as Todos Osmachka (Ukrainian: Тодось Осьмачка), was a Ukrainian writer, poet and translator. Representative of symbolism, expressionism, and neo-romanticism. Member of the writers' associations such as Association of Writers (Aspis) and "Lanka" (MARS). Translator of Shakespeare's works. Osmachka criticized the communist ideology and the intelligentsia that cooperated with the authorities of the Moscow government. Persecuted by the Soviet authorities, Osmachka immigrated to Germany and later to the United States.

== Early life and education ==
Teodosiy Stepanovych Osmachka was born on 16 May [O.S. 4 May] 1895 in the selo of Kutsivka, Cherkassy uezd (present-day, Cherkasy Raion, Ukraine) to the family of a rural laborer Stepan, who worked in the estate of the landowner Tereshchenko, and then single-handedly gained the profession and fame of a good veterinarian. All children in the family received secondary education. Osmachka acquired higher education on his own. In 1925 he graduated from the Kyiv Institute of Public Education.

== Early career ==
In 1916, Osmachka was drafted into the ranks of the Russian army to participate in the World War I.

His working career Osmachka started by teaching in folk schools. At the same time he started writing. During the World War I, for his poem Soldier's Thoughts he was put under military and political court in Russia. However the October revolution changed the political situation and he wasn't charged.

Since 1920, he has been an instructor for the training of education workers in Kremenchuk.

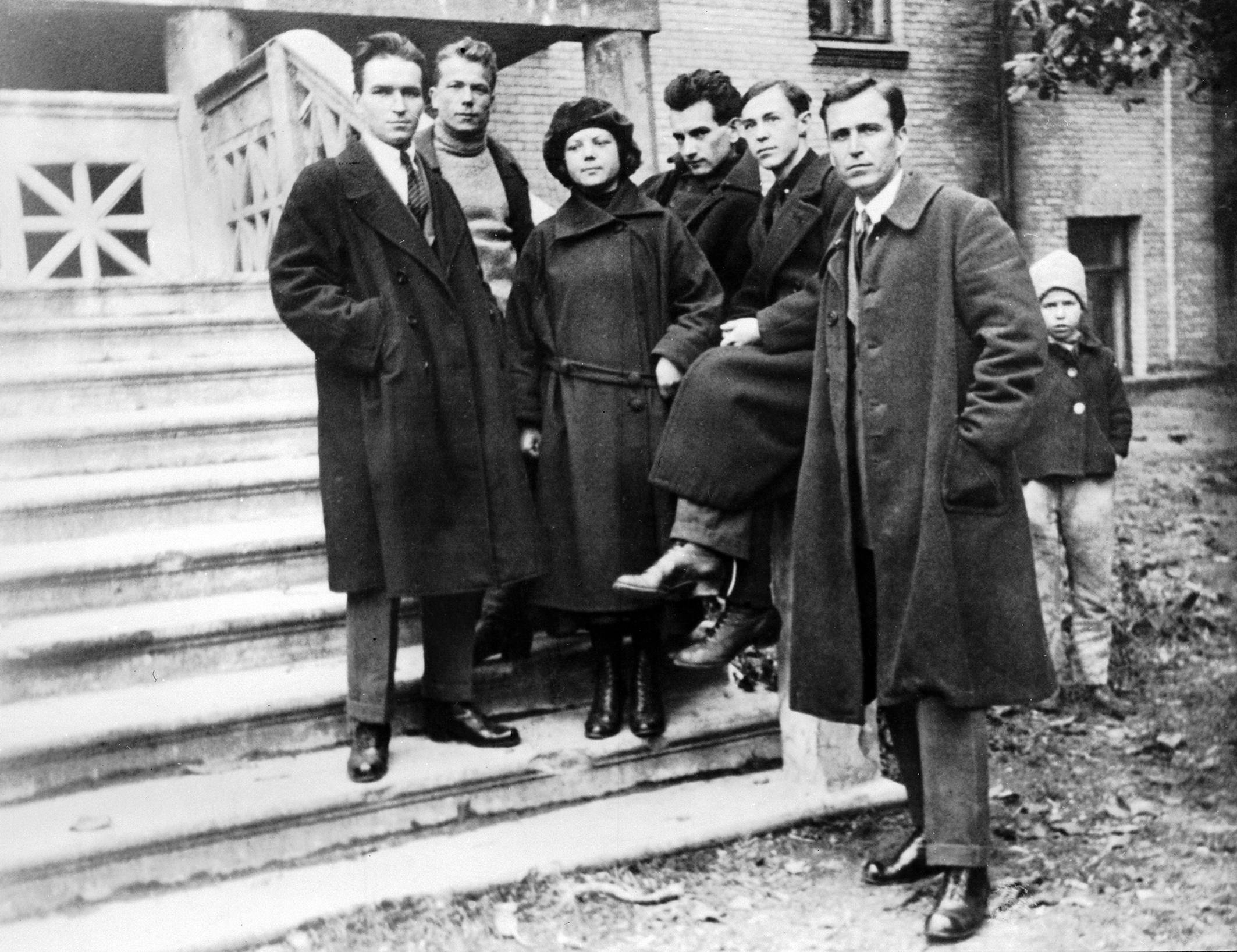
Members of the "Lanka" literary association. From left to right: Borys Antonenko-Davydovych, Hryhorii Kosynka, Maria Halych, Yevhen Pluzhnyk, Valerian Pidmohylny and Todos Osmachka. 1925.

== Literary activity ==
Osmachka's participation in literary life began during his student years. First, he was a member of the Association of Writers (ASPYS), which was headed by Mykola Zerov, and then "Lanka" (MARS), which included Hryhoriy Kosynka (Osmachka's closest friend), Borys Antonenko-Davydovych, Yevhen Pluzhnyk, Valerian Pidmohylny and Maria Halych.

The first collection of Osmachka's poems, Krucha, was published in 1922. Historian Serhii Yefremov in History of Ukrainian Literature noted it for the depth of imagery, brilliant vernacular, and epic style of thought. In 1925, the second book of poems Scythian fires, was published - which was dedicated to the Ukrainian steppe.

The last book by Osmachka, which was printed in Soviet Ukraine, was the collection Klekit (Kyiv, 1929). It was printed in the midst of preparations for the trial against the Ukrainian intelligentsia - the Union for the Liberation of Ukraine when the ideological press clamped down on individual freedom of creativity. The 1930s ideological persecutions known as the Executed Renaissance had already taken away the first close friends of the poet - Hryhoriy Kosynka, Dmytro Falkivskyi, and Valerian Pidmohylny.

== Persecution by the Soviet authorities ==
A wave of denunciations in the form of literary and critical articles branded Osmachka as the "enemy of the people". Escaping from repression, Osmachka made his way to Podillia, intending to cross the Polish border illegally. He was arrested and sent under escort to Sverdlovsk, but Osmachka escaped on the way and headed to Podillia again with the same intention. This time he was sent to prison on charges of espionage.

Expecting death, Osmachka makes the last decision - to fight, but "not as a means of strength, but as a means of weakness" and feigns madness. He was transferred to a psychiatric hospital in Kyiv. He was released, then arrested again. After another series of simulated seizures, Osmachka was released again. After that Osmachka began to hide wherever he could: in the houses of friends, cabins, in isolated farms and villages where he was not well known, sometimes even in his native village. He decided to move to Lviv after the German occupation of Ukraine began.

== Lviv period ==
In 1942, Osmachka arrived in Lviv with an unfinished verse novel The Poet. There he joined the literary life of the city, but imprisonment and torture left an imprint on his life. Osmachka became suspicious, mistrustful, withdrawn, and afraid of The People's Commissariat for Internal Affairs (NKVD), which made it difficult for him to communicate with people.

In Lviv, Osmachka published his fourth collection of poems, Contemporaries (1943), which marked a qualitatively new stage of his work. He was awarded a prize of 1,500 gold coins for the book.

In 1944, Osmachka wrote the story The Senior Boyaryn - the first lighthearted book, after the previous scary images of cruel life. However, only a year later, the poet returned to the "damned years" in the poem The Poet, full of personal impressions and experiences of repression.

== In emigration ==
Towards the end of 1944, Todos Osmachka, like Ulas Samchuk and many other writers, was forced to emigrate to the West. At first, he settled in Germany. Together with Ulas Samchuk Osmachka participated in the development of a new emigrant literary organization MUR (Ukrainian Art Movement). In 1953, the poetry collection Bouquets of Time was published, which collected poems from 1943 to 1948. In emigration, Osmachka's talent was revealed with new strength in his three prose works: The Senior Boyaryn (1946), Plan to the Yard (1951), and Rotunda of Soul Killers (1956). The poetic work of life was summarized in the book From Under the World (1954).

In Osmachka's travels around the world, he never stopped, haunted by the fear of reprisals against him by KGB agents. Having moved from Germany to the US, Osmachka wanted to focus on creative matters. He often spoke in front of Ukrainian communities, but fear and suspicion made him leave his place again and move from country to country.

Osmachka moved from Germany to the US, lived for some time in Canada, visited France, and traveled through Yugoslavia. On July 6, 1961, on one of the streets of Munich, he fell under the attack of nervous paralysis. Through the efforts of his friends, he was sent to the United States and placed for treatment at the Pilgrim State Hospital near New York. But on September 7, 1962, at the age of 67, Todos Osmachka died. He was buried at St. Andrew Ukrainian Orthodox Cemetery.

== Style ==
The work of Osmachka was significantly influenced by symbolism and expressionism. The influence of neo-romanticism is noticeable in late poetry collections. In his works, Osmachka paid particular attention to Ukrainian folk traditions and ethnography.

== Commemoration ==
- In Cherkasy, one of the alleys is named after Todos Osmachka.
- In his native village, one of the streets is named after Osmachka, and a memorial plaque has also been installed.
- The charitable foundation "Todos Osmachka" was founded.
- In 2004, the play "Day of Spirits," based on the works of Todos Osmachka, was staged at the Kyiv Young Theater.
- In 2005, Mykhailo Slaboshpytskyi published the biographical novel "Poet from Hell (Todos Osmachka)," for which he was awarded the Shevchenko National Prize.
- In 2013, the Todos Osmachka Literary Prize was established.
