= Maria Halych =

Ukrainian writer (1901–1974)

- Марія Галич
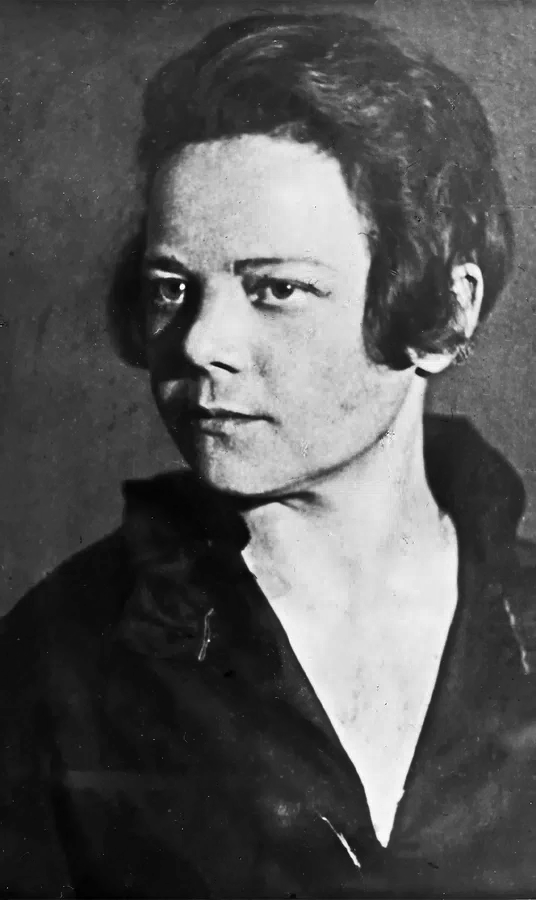
- Halych in 1930
- Born: Марія Олександрівна Галич; Maria Oleksandrivna Halych; 19 August [O.S. 6 August] 1901; Mokra Kalyhirka, Cherkassy uezd, Kiev Governorate, Russian Empire (now Ukraine)
- Died: 22 January 1974 (aged 72); Lviv, Ukrainian SSR, USSR
- Resting place: Lychakiv Cemetery (now Ukraine)
- Occupation: Writer

Maria Oleksandrivna Halych (Ukrainian: Марія Олександрівна Галич; 19 August [O.S. 6 August] 1901–22 January 1974) was a Ukrainian and Soviet writer of prose. In the 1920s Halych was a member of the Aspys and Lanka (later known as MARS) literary societies.

== Early life and education ==
Halych was born on 19 August [O.S. 6 August] 1901 in the selo of Mokra Kalyhirka, Cherkassy uezd (present-day Cherkasy Oblast, Ukraine) into a teacher's family with many children. After graduating from a two-class school, in 1918, she moved to Kyiv, where she worked at various jobs and studied at preparatory courses. In 1921, Halych entered the philological faculty of Kyiv National University of Theater, Cinema, and Television, which she graduated in 1926 without defending her diploma.

== Career ==
In the 1920s, Halych became a member of the Kyiv literary group Aspys, Lanka - Mars, where she was introduced to Ukrainian writer and novelist Hryhorii Kosynka.

Halych took part in the women's movement. She also participated in the efforts to eliminate illiteracy. From 1926 to 1930, she taught the Ukrainian language and literature in a workers' school. From 1928 to 29, Halych worked as a technical secretary of the Kyiv Local Committee of Writers and in 1930 as a film fiction writer at the Kyiv Film Factory. In 1931, Halych married and moved to Kharkiv, where she taught Ukrainian at the Agricultural Institute. In the 1930s, she withdrew from literary work, although she tried to return to it later.

After World War II, Halych lived in Lviv, where she taught Ukrainian language and literature at foreign language courses at the Teacher Improvement Institute and preparatory courses, and circles of scientific workers at the Lviv Forestry and Zooveterinary Institute. Together with her husband, S. Postrygan, she compiled the Terminological Dictionary of a Forester (Lviv, 1980).

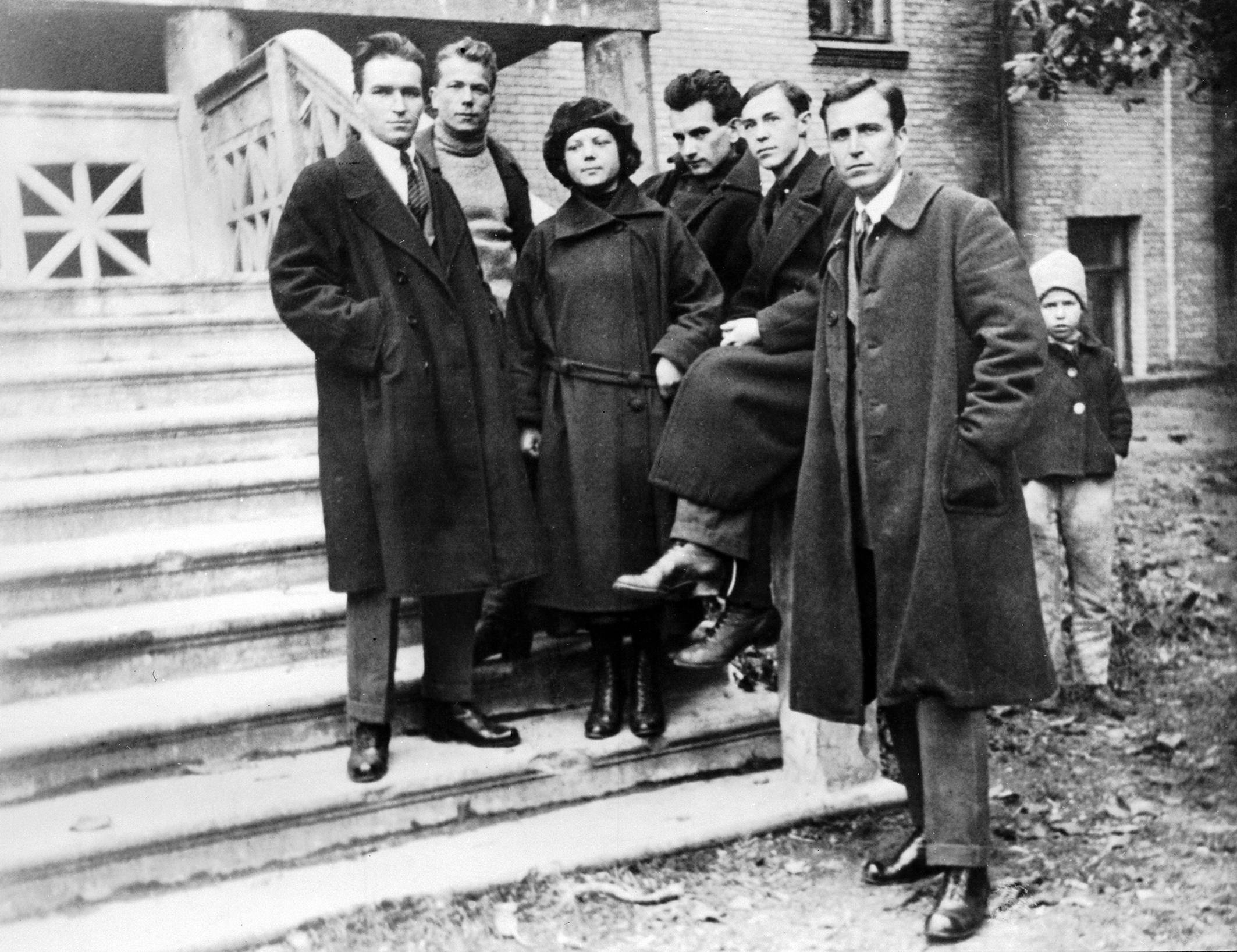
Members of the literary group Lanka, 1925. Left to right: Borys Antonenko-Davydovych, Hryhoriy Kosynka, Maria Halych, Yevhen Pluzhnyk, Valerian Pidmohylny, Todos Osmachka.

After the rehabilitation of the members of “Lanka,” Halych takes an active part in the Lviv evenings of commemoration and writes memories about Yevhen Pluzhnyk, Hryhorii Kosynka, and Valerian Pidmohylny, which remained in manuscripts.

Maria Halych died in Lviv and was buried on field 68 of the Lychakiv cemetery in Lviv.

== Works ==
Halych wrote Impressionist prose such as the collections Printer (1927), My Career (1930), short story Spring (1928), and memoirs. The works of Maria Halych describe the fate of women under new social conditions as well as human psychology in a critical, "borderline" situation.

The post-war works by Halych are marked by communist ideology: Kharitina (1956), Mothers and Children (1957), and Girl with a Gun (1954).
