= Aspys =

Ukrainian literary society (1923–1924)

- Association of Writers
- Асоціація Письменників (АСПИС)
- Abbreviation: Aspys
- Formation: 1923
- Dissolved: 1924
- Location: Kyiv, Ukraine SSR, USSR (now Ukraine)

The Association of Writers (Ukrainian: Асоціація Письменників, romanized: Asotsiatsiia pysmennykiv), known as Aspys (АСПИС), was a Ukrainian literary society active in Kyiv from the end of 1923 to 1924. Aspys was led by Mykola Zerov and Mykhailo Mohyliansky.

In 1924, disagreements about Ukrainian national heritage and the future of Ukrainian literature caused a split within Aspys and led to the formation of the Lanka (Ланка; lit. 'Link') literary society. Following the creation of Lanka, Aspys was dissolved.

== Members ==
- Borys Antonenko-Davydovych
- Vasyl Atamaniuk
- Pavlo Fylypovych
- Maria Halych
- Mykhailo Ivchenko
- Hryhorii Kosynka
- Jurij Meschenko
- Mykhailo Mohyliansky
- Valerian Pidmohylny
- Yevhen Pluzhnyk
- Natalya Romanovych-Tkachenko
- Maksym Rylsky
- Liudmyla Starytska-Cherniakhivska
- Dmytro Zahul
- Mykola Zerov
