= Executed Renaissance =

Ukrainian cultural figures persecuted, executed or repressed during the Stalinist regime

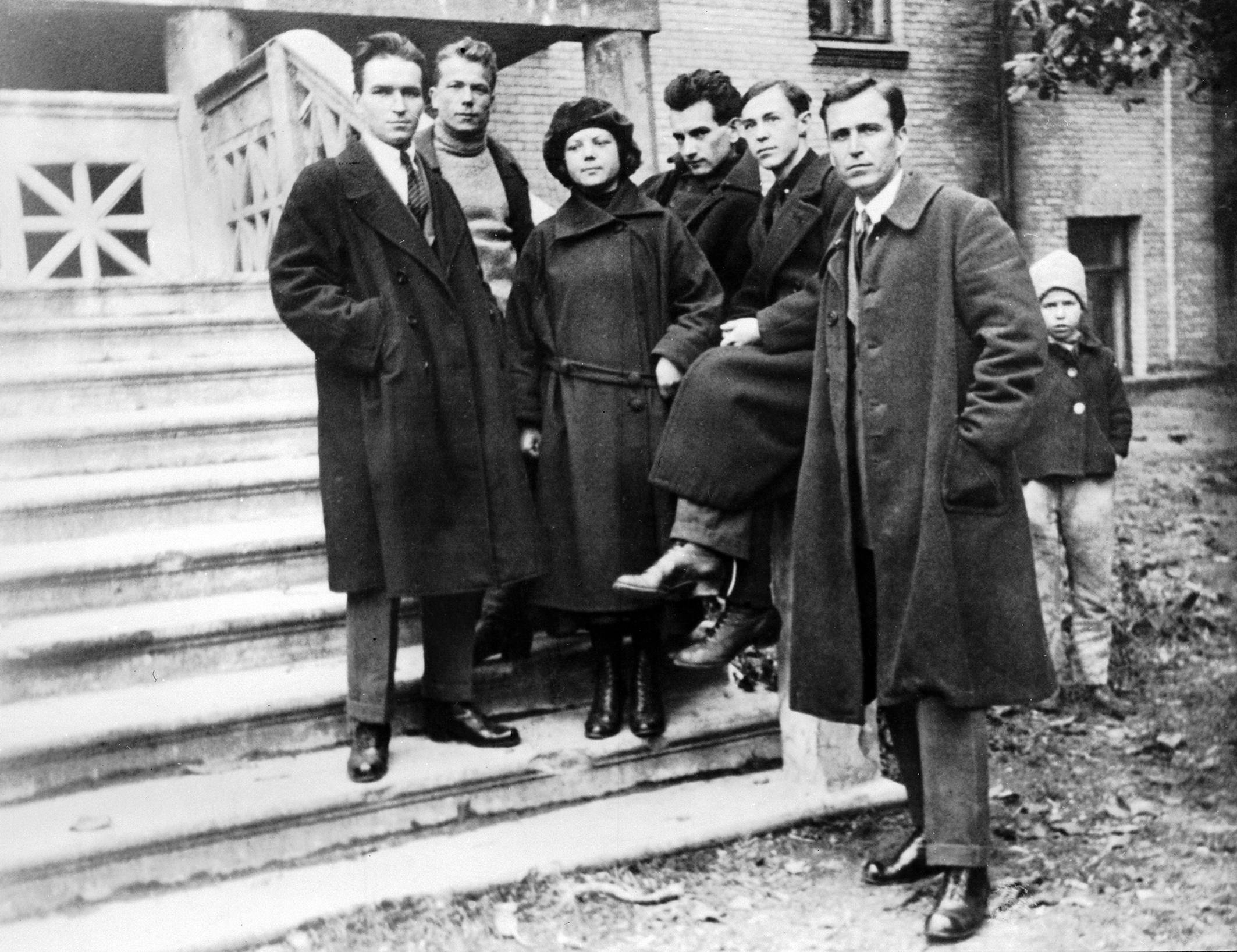
Members of the literary group Lanka in 1924. From left to right: Borys Antonenko-Davydovych, Hryhorii Kosynka, Maria Halych, Yevhen Pluzhnyk, Valerian Pidmohylny and Todos Osmachka. Kosynka, Pluzhnyk and Pidmohylny would all be executed under Stalin.

The Executed Renaissance (Ukrainian: Розстріляне відродження, romanized: Rozstriliane vidrodzhennia), or Red Renaissance (Ukrainian: Червоний ренесанс, romanized: Chervonyi renesans), was a generation of Ukrainian artists and intellectuals of the 1920s and early 1930s in the Ukrainian Soviet Socialist Republic who produced significant works in literature, philosophy, painting, music, theater, cinema, education, and science before being mostly destroyed during Stalin's Great Terror.

The 1920s were a period of national cultural flourishing in Soviet Ukraine, enabled by the collapse of the Russian Empire and the end of imperial censorship, along with the early Soviet policy of nativization. This was ended by the 1930 show trial of the Union for the Liberation of Ukraine, which convicted 45 Ukrainian intellectuals on charges of anti-state or counter-revolutionary activity; up to 30,000 more would be arrested, deported, or executed over the following decade, culminating in the Great Purge of 1937-38.

The term was coined in 1959 by the Polish émigré publisher Jerzy Giedroyc, editor of the influential Kultura magazine in Paris, who suggested it to Ukrainian émigré and literary critic Yuriy Lavrinenko as a title for his anthology of the period's best Ukrainian literature.

== Background ==
Following the collapse of the Russian Empire during the First World War, the Ukrainian War of Independence, and the occupation of the majority of the Ukrainian lands by the Bolsheviks, Ukraine was incorporated into the newly created Union of Soviet Socialist Republics as a Soviet republic. During the early years of Communist rule, Lenin believed that the promotion of national movements and their right to self-determination would help the Communist cause of a proletarian revolution. His argument was that in order to move away from the view of Russia as an oppressing nation and the mistrust of Russian government under the tsars, all nations within Russia should have an equal right to self-determination. In addition to Lenin's belief, the Soviet government saw the promotion of the Ukrainian language as a tool to win over loyalty of the local Ukrainian population, legitimize their rule, and to show the advantages of the newly formed Soviet-style system to the international community. This led to a more lenient stance on national self-expression, or Korenizatsiia. In the Ukrainian SSR, the Ukrainian language was promoted both on an administrative and on a societal level. In the early 1920s, the Ukrainian Soviet government passed multiple decrees to transition state institutions into the Ukrainian language while allowing Russian and other minority languages at a local level. In an effort to also lower the illiteracy rate in Soviet Ukraine, promotion of Ukrainian had also taken place in educational institutions and writing. By 1929, the number of higher education institutions that used Ukrainian as their language jumped to 69%, a massive increase from the 28.5% in 1926. Book publishing in Ukrainian also rose significantly. In 1923, only about a quarter of book copies were published in Ukrainian. By 1928, it was 60 percent. Prominent members of the Ukrainian intelligentsia such as Mykola Khvylovy also emerged during this time, combining both elements of communism and Ukrainian culture into national communism.

Despite the relaxation of restrictions on the Ukrainian language and culture, tensions still existed between the Soviet central government in Moscow and the Ukrainian intelligentsia. The main source of the tension was the question of whether the loyalty of the Ukrainian intelligentsia was to the Ukrainian national movement or to the Soviet government. Tensions escalated in the later 1920s due to a 1925-1928 literary discussion held by the Ukrainian intelligentsia. The discussion was centered on the issue of whether Ukrainian literature should take course on aligning more with European literature or with Russian literature. In one of those discussions, Mykola Khvylovy, one of the main figures of the Ukrainian intelligentsia, urged Ukrainian literature to get away from Moscow as much as possible. This caused outrage within the Soviet government and Joseph Stalin specifically, who complained about Khvylovy in his letter to Lazar Kaganovich and expressed the need to combat extremes like him. With the eventual consolidation of power under Joseph Stalin, Korenizatsiia was slowly reversed until it was abandoned in the late 1930s in favor of Russification.

== As a title ==
The term "Executed Renaissance" was first proposed in 1959 by Jerzy Giedroyc, editor of the Polish literary magazine Kultura in Paris, and it was devoted to publishing anti-communist writers from throughout the Polish diaspora. In a 13 August 1958 letter to Yuriy Lavrinenko, Giedroyc referred to an anthology of recent Ukrainian literature which Lavrinenko had prepared at Giedroyc's request:

"About the name. Could it be better to give it a generic name: Executed Renaissance. Anthology 1917–1933 etc. The name would then sound spectacular. On the other hand, the humble name Anthology can only facilitate penetration by the Iron Curtain. What do you think?"

"So be it," replied Lavrinenko.

The book The Executed Renaissance, An Anthology, 1917–1933: Poetry, Prose, Drama and the Essay, published in Paris by Kultura (1959), remains one of the most important sources for the history of Ukrainian literature during the period. It includes the best examples of Ukrainian poetry, prose, and essay-writing from the 1920s and early 1930s.

According to Ukrainian literary historian Yarina Tsymbal, The Executed Renaissance was "a good name for the anthology, but unsuitable for the whole generation of creative intelligentsia." In her view, the "Red Renaissance" is a more apt metaphor because it was a self-description. The latter term first appeared in 1925 when Olexander Leites' book The Renaissance of Ukrainian Literature and the poem "The Call of the Red Renaissance" by Volodymyr Gadzinskyi were published simultaneously and independently. That same year, the magazine Neo-Lif appeared with a preface by Gadzinskyi: "For us the past is only a means of cognizing the present and future," he wrote, "a useful experience and an important practice in the great structure of the Red Renaissance."

== A new elite ==
Lavrinenko, however, saw the "Executed Renaissance" as more than just the title of an anthology. He promoted it as a term encapsulating the martyrdom of Ukrainian poets and their legacy and power to resurrect Ukrainian culture. The Executed Renaissance paradigm, together with the national-communist perspective and as a framework for the nationalization of Ukraine's early Soviet intellectuals, would later emerge as part of an effort to establish a national opposition to the Communist regime with the new intellectual elite, eventually contributing to a struggle for an independent and united country.

The main elements in the outlook of the new Ukrainian intellectuals were rebellion, independent thought, and genuine belief in their own ideals. The intellectuals emphasised the individual rather than the masses. Like many other proponents of inner emigration in a police state, their outward "Sovietness" concealed deep searches and queries.

Many members of the new generation of Ukrainian artists came from lower class backgrounds, including the families of servants, priests, industrial workers, and peasants. War, famine, and the need to earn a living often prevented them from receiving a systemic education. Despite this, they sought out contact with international culture and engaged with contemporary artistic movements.

At this time, a new generation arose, bearing the moral burden of victories and defeats in the struggle for national independence, with an understanding of Ukraine's path in world history, independent in its judgements, with diverse ideas about the development of Ukrainian literature when, according to Solomiia Pavlychko, literature

"got a much wider audience than ever before. The level of education of this audience has increased. For the first time, a large number of writers and intellectuals worked in literature. For the first time, Ukrainian scientists spoke to the audience of national universities. For the first time, different artistic directions, groups, and schools were rapidly differentiated. However, the tendency for the modernization of cultural life coexisted from the outset with a parallel tendency for its subordination to ideology and then to complete destruction."

== Literary groups ==
For the most part writers were consolidated into literary organizations with different styles or positions. The period between 1925 and 1928 saw a "literary discussion" initiated by Mykola Khvylovy. One of its objects was to determine the ways in which the new Ukrainian Soviet literature would develop and define the role of the writer in society. Khvylovy and his associates supported an orientation towards West European rather than Russian culture; they rejected "red graphomania" but did not reject communism as a political ideology.

The main literary organizations of that time were:

- Hart (Ukrainian: Гарт, hardening) existed from 1923 to 1925. Its main goal was uniting of all kinds of proletarian artists with further development of proletarian culture. One of the requirements of "Hart" was using of Ukrainian language. The organization ceased to exist after the death of its leader Vasyl Ellan-Blakytny.
- VAPLITE (Ukrainian: ВАПЛІТЕ, "The Free Academy of Proletarian Literature") was created in 1926 by Mykola Khvylovy on the base of "Hart". Its goal was to create a new Ukrainian literature by adopting the best achievements of Western European culture. VAPLITE accepted Communism as political ideology but rejected the necessity for ideological meaning in literature as its main requirement Among the members of VAPLITE were Oleksandr Dovzhenko, Mykola Kulish, Les Kurbas, Mayk Johansen, Pavlo Tychyna, Oleksa Slisarenko, Mykola Bazhan, Yuriy Smolych and Yulian Shpol.
- MARS (Ukrainian: МАРС, "The Workshop of Revolutionary Literature") existed from 1924 to 1929 (primarily under name of "Lanka"). The main postulate of MARS was to honestly and artistically describe that epoch. Among its members were Valerian Pidmohylny, Hryhorii Kosynka, Yevhen Pluzhnyk, Borys Antonenko-Davydovych, Todos Osmachka, Ivan Bahrianyi and Maria Halych.
- Aspanfut (Ukrainian: Аспанфут), later Komunkult (Ukrainian: Комункульт) was an organization of Ukrainian Futurists. Their values were "Communism, Internationalism, Industrialism, Rationalization, Inventions and Quality". Among its members were Mykhayl Semenko, Heo Shkurupiy, Yuriy Yanovsky and Yulian Shpol.
- The Neo-Classicists (Ukrainian: Неокласики) were a literary movement of modernists among whose followers were Mykola Zerov, Maksym Rylsky, Pavlo Fylypovych and Mykhailo Drai-Khmara. They never established a formal organization or programme, but shared cultural and aesthetic interests. The Neo-Classicists were concerned with the production of high art and disdained "mass art", didactic writing, and propagandistic work.
- Pluh (Ukrainian: Плуг, plough), an organization of rural writers. Their main postulate was the "struggle against proprietary ideology among peasants and promotion of the Proletarian Revolution's ideals". Among its members were Serhiy Pylypenko, Petro Panch, Dokiia Humenna and Andrii Holovko.
- Zakhidna Ukraina (Ukrainian: Західна Україна; English: West Ukraine) after April 1926 it separated from Pluh as an independent literary organization of fifty writers and artists from West Ukraine based in Kyiv, Odesa, Dnipro and Poltava. Headed first by Dmytro Zagul, later by Myroslav Irchan.

== Innovation ==
The writers of the Ukrainian (Red) Renaissance divided prose in two: plot (narrative) prose and non-plot prose. In the non-plot works, it was not the sentence or the word that was paramount, but the subtext, the spirit, or as Khvylovyi put it, the "smell of the word". The style of strong feelings and penetration of phenomena is called "neo-romanticism" or "expressionism". Among the many Ukrainian-language authors working in this style were Mykola Khvylovy ("Julia Shpol"), Yurii Yanovsky, Andrii Holovko, Oleksa Vlyko, Les Kurbas and Mykola Kulish.

The main themes of Khvylovy's novel Ya (Romantyka) (I am (romance)) are disappointment in the Revolution, and the screaming contradictions and divided nature of human beings at that time. The main character is without a name, and therefore without personality or soul. For the sake of the Revolution he murders his mother and then reproves himself: "Was the Revolution worth such a sacrifice?" In Valeryan Pidmogylny's novel The City, for the first time in Ukrainian literature, elements of existentialism emerged. In pursuit of pleasure its protagonist advances from the satisfaction of his physical desires to the highest religious needs. Even with such a complex subject matter, however, the author does not turn his novel into a simple narrative of "people's" philosophy, but grasps it creatively in its application to a national worldview.

In the Ukrainian-language poetry of the time, the most interesting development is the quest pursued by the Symbolists Olexandr Oles and Pavlo Tychyna. In The Clarinets of the Sun, Tychyna reflected the breadth of an educated and subtle mind contemplating the richness of his national heritage and striving to uncover its root causes. When the Communist Party of the USSR realized it could not control such writers, it began to use impermissible methods of repression: it forced them into silence, subjected them to crushing public criticism, and arrested or executed them. Writers faced a choice between suicide (Khvylovyi in 1933) and the concentration camps (Gulag) (B. Antonenko-Davidovich and Ostap Vyshnya); they could retreat into silence (Ivan Bahrianyi and V. Domontovich), leave Ukraine (V. Vynnychenko and Yevhen Malaniuk), or write works that glorified the Communist Party (P. Tychyna and Mykola Bazhan). Most artists of this brief Renaissance were arrested and imprisoned or shot.

== Deportation, arrests and executions (1927–1938) ==
In 1927, Stalin abolished the New Economic Policy and turned to the forced industrialisation and the collectivization of agriculture of the First Five-Year Plan. Changes in cultural politics also occurred. An early example was the 1930 show trial of the Union for the Freedom of Ukraine process at which 45 intellectuals, higher education professors, writers, a theologian and a priest were publicly prosecuted in Kharkiv, then capital of Soviet Ukraine. Fifteen of the accused were executed, many more with links to the defendants (248) were sent to the camps; this was one of a series of contemporary show trials, held in the North Caucasus, 1929 in Shakhty, and in Moscow, the 1930 Industrial Party Trial and the 1931 Menshevik Trial.

The systematic elimination of the Ukrainian intelligentsia began in May 1933 when Mykhailo Yalovyi was arrested; in response Mykola Khvylovy committed suicide in the "Slovo" (Word) Building in Kharkiv. The campaign ran from 1934 to 1940, reaching a peak during the Great Terror of 1937–1938. A total of 223 writers were arrested and in a number of cases imprisoned and shot. Almost three hundred representatives of the Ukrainian Renaissance of the 1920s and 1930s were shot between 27 October and 4 November 1937 at Sandarmokh, a massive killing field in Karelia (northwest Russia). Some important representatives of this generation survived. Many remained in the Soviet Union: Oleksandr Dovzhenko, Pavlo Tychyna, Maksym Rylskyi, Borys Antonenko-Davydovych, Ostap Vyshnia, and Mykola Bazhan. A few emigrated: Ulas Samchuk, George Shevelov, and Ivan Bahrianyi.

=== Scale of the tragedy ===
According to historian Victoria Malko, more than 30,000 Ukrainian intellectuals were arrested, deported, or executed in connection with the 1930 Trial of the Union for the Liberation of Ukraine and subsequent repressions.

Figures for the fates of Ukrainian writers specifically are more precise. The "Slovo" Association (Ukrainian writers in emigration) sent its assessment on 20 December 1954 to the Second All-Union Congress of Writers in the USSR: in 1930, works by 259 Ukrainian writers were in print; after 1938 only 36 writers were published (13.9% of the earlier total). According to "Slovo", 192 of the "missing" 223 writers were deported, sent to the Gulag or executed; a further 16 disappeared; and eight writers committed suicide. These data are confirmed by The Altar of Sorrow (ed., Olexii Musiienko), a martyrology of Ukrainian writers, which numbers 246 writer-victims of Stalin's terror. Other sources indicate that 228 of 260 Ukrainian writers were deported, imprisoned or shot.

== See also ==
- Anti-Ukrainian sentiment
- History of Ukrainian literature
- Sandarmokh (killing field and memorial complex, Karelia)
- Slovo Building (Kharkiv)
- Slovo House (2017 film)
- The Executed Renaissance Anthology, Kultura: Paris (1959)
- 1937 mass execution of Belarusians
- Yurii Kerpatenko

== Bibliography ==
- Юрій Лавріненко. Розстріляне відродження: Антологія 1917–1933. — Київ: Смолоскип, 2004.
- Розстріляне Відродження
- Orest Subtelny. Ukraine: A History. University of Toronto Press, 2000 – 736 p.
- Mace James Ernest. Communism and the Dilemmas of National Liberation: National Communism in Soviet Ukraine, 1918—1933 / James Earnest Mace, Harvard Ukrainian Research Institute, Ukrainian Academy of Arts and Sciences in the United States. Cambridge: Distributed by Harvard University Press for the Harvard Ukrainian Research Institute and the Ukrainian Academy of Arts and Sciences in the U.S., 1983. — 334 pp.
- Розстріляне Відродження

=== Further reading ===
- Méheut, Constant (4 December 2024). "Stalin Silenced These Ukrainian Writers. The War Made Them Famous Again". New York Times.
