= MARS (literary organization, Ukraine) =

Ukrainian literary organization

Workshop of the Revolutionary Word
- Майстерня революційного слова (МАРС)
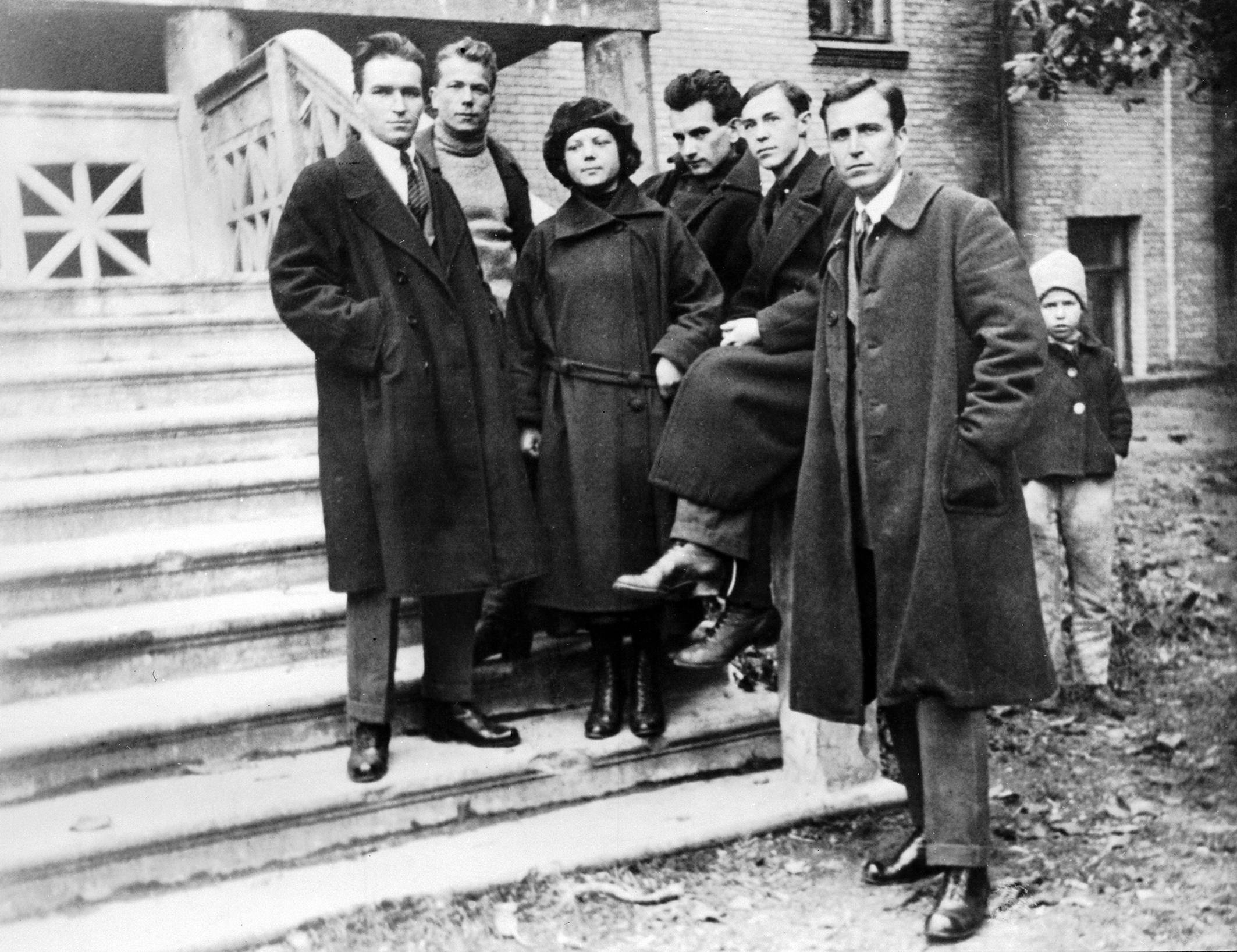
- Members of Lanka in 1925; left to right: Antonenko-Davydovych, Kosynka, Halych, Pluzhnyk, Pidmohylny, Osmachka
- Abbreviation: MARS
- Formation: 1924
- Dissolved: 1929
- Formerly called: Lanka (Ланка)

MARS (Ukrainian: МАРС, abbreviation from Майстерня революційного слова, lit. 'Workshop of the Revolutionary Word') was a Ukrainian literary group active in Kyiv.

== History ==
It was created in 1924 as Lanka (Ланка, lit. 'link'), and adopted its better known name in 1926. Members of MARS belonged to various literary movements, but were united with the goal of protecting their creative autonomy from official policies of the Communist Party. The group involved notable personalities, such as Borys Antonenko-Davydovych, Mykhailo Ivchenko, Yakiv Kachura, Hryhorii Kosynka, Todos Osmachka, Valerian Pidmohylny, Yevhen Pluzhnyk, and Yakiv Savchenko. Members of MARS beloned to the staff of Zhyttia i Revoliutsiya ("Life and Revolution") magazine and cooperated with Neoclassicists, opposing the politicization of literature by Communist authorities. As a result, the group was dissolved in 1929. Many of its members, including Kosynka, Pidmohylny, Pluzhnyk and Savchenko, were executed, while others were imprisoned and persecuted or had to emigrate.
