= Yurii Kerpatenko =

Ukrainian conductor (1976–2022)

- Юрій Керпатенко
- Born: 9 September 1976; Kherson, Ukrainian SSR, Soviet Union
- Died: 28 September 2022 (aged 46); Kherson, Ukraine
- Education: Kherson School of Music; Kyiv Conservatory
- Occupations: Conductor; orchestrator; accordionist
- Years active: 2000–2022

Yurii Leonidovych Kerpatenko (Ukrainian: Юрій Леонідович Керпатенко; 9 September 1976 – 28 September 2022) was a Ukrainian conductor, orchestrator, and accordionist who was the principal conductor of the Mykola Kulish Music and Drama Theatre from 2004 until his death in 2022. He was also the principal conductor of the Gileya chamber orchestra of the Kherson Regional Philharmonic from 2000 until 2022. Kerpatenko declined to cooperate during the Russian occupation of Kherson Oblast and was killed by Russian soldiers in his home in September 2022.

== Life ==
Kerpatenko was born 9 September 1976 in Kherson. He graduated in the accordion class from State Secondary School No. 1 in 1991 under teacher A.V. Kostrub. Kerpatenko attended the Kherson School of Music from 1991 until his graduation in 1995 where he studied under V.I. Melnichenko. He graduated from the Kyiv Conservatory in 2000 where he studied in the department of folk instruments and was part of the accordion class. He was considered a virtuoso player of the Bayan. In 2004, Kerpatenko also graduated with distinction from the department of opera and symphonic conducting under professor V.B. Hnyedash and instrumental science and orchestration under professor Lev Kolodub.

He became the principal conductor of the Kherson Regional Philharmonic's chamber orchestra, "Gilea" in 2000. Since August 2004, he was also the principal conductor of the Mykola Kulish Music and Drama Theatre. During the Russian occupation of Kherson Oblast, Kerpatenko continued posting defiant messages on Facebook through May 2022.

== Death ==
In September 2022, family members of Kerpatenko outside of Kherson lost contact with him. The Ukrainian Ministry of Culture and Information Policy reported that he had declined to participate in an upcoming October 1 concert hosted by the Russian occupiers. The Russian administration planned to feature Kerpatenko's Gileya chamber orchestra in a concert "intended by the occupiers to demonstrate the so-called 'improvement of peaceful life' in Kherson". Later, the Ukrainian ministry claimed that he was shot dead in his home by the Russian military due to refusing to cooperate with them during their occupation of Kherson Oblast. His death was reported on 13 October 2022.

=== Reactions ===
Ukraine's Kherson regional prosecutor's office is investigating his death "on the basis of violations of the laws and customs of war, combined with intentional murder." Musicians Dalia Stasevska, Semyon Bychkov, Vlad, and Roger O'Donnell and writer Andrey Kurko responded to the news of his death on social media.

== See also ==
- Executed Renaissance
