= Bogdan Czaykowski =

Polish Canadian writer and academic

Bogdan Czaykowski (1932–2007) was a Polish Canadian poet, essayist, literary translator and literary critic, professor emeritus and former Dean at the University of British Columbia.

Czaykowski was born in Równe, Poland. In 1940 his family was deported to Siberia by the Communists, and his father died in a Gulag concentration camp, while his brother died of starvation. He wrote numerous articles in academic journals and literary magazines, and was the subject of literary research papers. Czaykowski received the Killam Prize in 1996 and several Polish literary awards, among others, from Fundacja Kościelskich (1964) and Fundacja Turzańskich (1992).

His poetic debut was in the monthly Kultura paryska ("Kultura" Literary Institute, Paris, 1955). Czaykowski published also many essays on other writers and literary subjects.

Czaykowski died in 2007 in Vancouver, British Columbia, Canada.

== Published books of poetry ==
• Trzciny czcionek (London, 1957); • Sura (London, 1961); • Spór z granicami (Paris, 1964); • Point-no-Point (Paris, 1971); • Wiatr z innej strony ( Kraków, 1990); • Okanagańskie sady ( Wrocław, 1998, ISBN 83-7023-633-2); • Jakieś ogromne szczęście (Cracow, 2007, ISBN 978-83-240-0826-1).

In anthologies: • Ryby na piasku (London, 1965); • Postwar Polish Poetry (New York, 1965); • Een Gevecht om Lucht (Maasbree, 1979); • The Burning Forest (Bloodaxe, 1988); • Panorama der Polnishen Literatur des 20. Jahrhunderts (Zurich, 1996); Scanning the Century: the Penguin Book of the Twentieth Century in Poetry (London, 1999).

He was a frequent contributor to many literary journals and magazines, including Kultura (Paris), Kontynenty (London), Fraza (Rzeszów), Strumień (Vancouver), Twórczość (Warsaw) and others.

↑(all titles in original languages of publications - Polish, German, and English)
