= Giedroyc Doctrine =

Political doctrine urging reconciliation among European countries

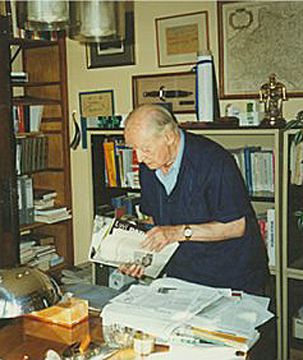
Jerzy Giedroyc (Maisons-Laffitte, 1997)

The Giedroyc doctrine (pronounced [ˈɡʲɛdrɔjt͡s]; Polish: doktryna Giedroycia) or Giedroyc–Mieroszewski doctrine was a political doctrine that urged reconciliation among Central and Eastern European countries. It was developed by postwar Polish émigrés, and was named for Jerzy Giedroyc, a Polish émigré publicist, with significant contributions by Juliusz Mieroszewski for whom it is also sometimes named.

== History ==
Giedroyc developed the doctrine in the 1970s in the journal Kultura with Juliusz Mieroszewski (the doctrine is sometimes called the Giedroyc-Mieroszewski doctrine) and other émigrés of the "Maisons-Laffitte group". The doctrine can be traced to the interwar Prometheist project of Józef Piłsudski.

The doctrine urged the need to rebuild good relations among East-Central and East European countries. The doctrine also claimed that the preservation of independence by the new post-Soviet states that lie between Poland and the Russian Federation is a fundamental Polish long-term interest. This called for Poland to reject any imperial ambitions and controversial territorial claims, and to accept the postwar border changes. The doctrine supported independence for Belarus and Ukraine. It also advocated treating all East European countries as equal in importance to Russia, and refusing special treatment for Russia. The doctrine was not hostile to Russia, but called on both Poland and Russia to abandon their struggle over domination of other East European countries — in this context, mainly the Baltic states, Belarus, and Ukraine (hence another name for the doctrine: the "ULB doctrine", where "ULB" stands for "Ukraine, Lithuania, Belarus").

Initially it addressed the attitude of post-World War II Polish emigres, especially around the Polish government-in-exile in London, and called for recognition of the post-war status quo. Later it emphasized the goal of moving Belarus, Ukraine, and Lithuania away from the Soviet, and later the Russian, sphere of influence.

The doctrine supported the European Union and aimed at removing East-Central and East European countries from the Soviet sphere of influence. After Poland regained its independence from Soviet influence following the fall of communism in 1989, the doctrine was implemented in Poland's Eastern foreign policies. Poland itself began integrating into the European Union, eventually joining the EU in 2004. Poland has likewise supported Ukrainian membership in the European Union and NATO. The doctrine has resulted in some tensions in Polish-Russian relations.

The doctrine has been questioned by some commentators and politicians, particularly in the 21st century, and it has been suggested that in recent years the doctrine has been abandoned by the Polish Foreign Ministry. Others, however, argue that the policy remains in force and is endorsed by the Polish Foreign Ministry. Pietrzak argues that "Although Giedroyć and Mieroszewski were idealistic, and they were very often criticized for the naïve character of their ideas, they were proven right, for they managed to inadvertently shape the future of the region and encourage most of the countries that border Russia to be more proactive in doing their utmost to preventing a domino effect in Eastern Europe – for Russia clearly attempted to implement a Sudetenland-type scenario in Ukraine in 2022".

== See also ==
- Intermarium (Międzymorze)
- Polish Government in exile
- Prometheism
- Territorial changes of Poland
