= Juliusz Mieroszewski =

Polish journalist, publicist and political commentator

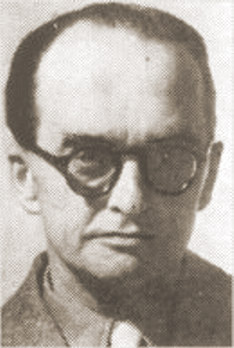
Juliusz Mieroszewski.

Juliusz Mieroszewski (Polish pronunciation: [ˈjuljuʂ mjɛrɔˈʂɛfskʲi]; 2 February 1906 – 21 June 1976) was a Polish journalist, publicist and political commentator. He wrote under the pseudonyms "J. Calveley" and "Londyńczyk" (Londoner).

He was born in Kraków.

In interwar Poland he was co-editor of Ilustrowany Kurier Codzienny (Illustrated Daily Courier), where his beat was German politics and policy.

During World War II he escaped from Nazi occupied Poland and worked for publications of the Polish government in exile, "Ku Wolnej Polsce" (For a Free Poland), "Orzeł Biały" (The White Eagle), "Parada" (Parade).

After the war, with Poland falling under communist rule, he decided to stay in Great Britain. He wrote columns for the émigré weekly Wiadomości Literackie ( Literary News). Between 1950 and 1972 he was chief editor of the "English section" of the influential Parisian émigré journal "Kultura". In the 1970s Mieroszewski was the closest collaborator of the journal's chief editor, Jerzy Giedroyc. While at the time Poland was an authoritarian communist state, controlled by the Soviet Union, Mieroszewski and Giedroyc, in the pages of the journal, sought to articulate a political programme for what they envisioned as a future independent Polish state and its relations with its former Kresy territories, annexed by Soviet Russia, known as the Gedroyc-Mieroszewski doctrine. Mieroszewski was not only a dedicated socialist, but was strongly opposed to communism and the Soviet domination of Eastern Europe. A crucial, and at the time unique, consideration of the Kultura programme was the Polish relationship with the national aspirations of the country's former minorities, the Belarusians, Lithuanians and Ukrainians. Mieroszewski was a political adversary of fellow socialist, Adam Pragier, with whom he engaged in political and literary polemics through their respective columns published in Paris and London.

Mieroszewski was also a translator - he translated George Orwell's 1984, as well as works by Bertrand Russell and Arnold Toynbee into Polish. He died in London in 1976 and was buried at South Ealing Cemetery (division HH).

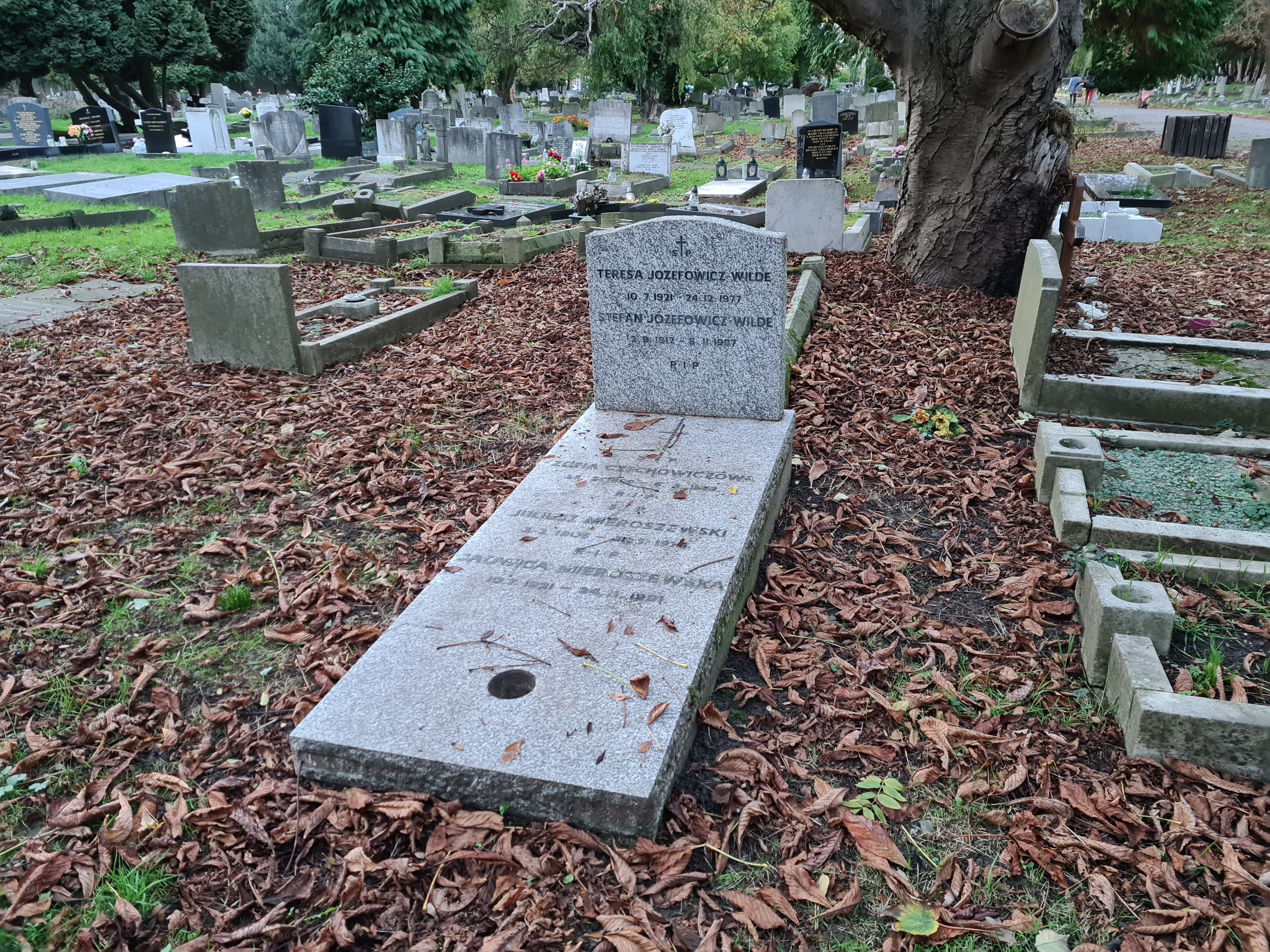
Juliusz Mieroszewski's grave

== Selected works ==
- Ewolucjonizm. Paris 1964, pub. Instytut Literacki
- Polityczne neurozy. Paris 1967, wyd.Instytut Literacki
- Modele i praktyka. Paris 1970, wyd. Instytut Literacki
- Materiały do refleksji i zadumy. Paris 1976, wyd. Instytut Literacki. II obieg – Krakowskie Towarzystwo Wydawnicze 1984
- Finał klasycznej Europy. (selected and edited by Rafał Habielski); Warsaw 1997: Wyd. Towarzystwo Opieki Archiwum Instytut Literacki Archive in Paris; Lublin 1997: published by Uniwersytet Marii Curie-Skłodowskiej, ISBN 83-227-1007-0, (Uniwersytet Marii Curie-Skłodowskiej in Lublin), Wers.
- Jerzy Giedroyc, Juliusz Mieroszewski Listy 1949-1956. Cz. 1 – 2; wybrał i wstępem poprzedził Krzysztof Pomian; przypisami i indeksami opatrzyli Jacek Krawczyk i Krzysztof Pomian; szkicem o Mieroszewskich i Mieroszewskim uzup. Piotr Wandycz. Warszawa 1999: Wyd. "Spółdzielnia Wydawnicza „Czytelnik”, ISBN 83-07-02474-9.
