= Doctrine =

Codification of beliefs

Doctrine (from Latin: doctrina, meaning 'teaching, instruction') is a codification of beliefs or a body of teachings or instructions, taught principles or positions, as the essence of teachings in a given branch of knowledge or in a belief system. The etymological Greek analogue is 'catechism'.

Often the word doctrine specifically suggests a body of religious principles as promulgated by a church. Doctrine may also refer to a principle of law, in the common-law traditions, established through a history of past decisions.

== Religious usage ==
Examples of religious doctrines include:

- Christian theology:
  - Doctrines such as the Trinity, the virgin birth and atonement
  - The Salvation Army Handbook of Doctrine
  - Transubstantiation and Marian teachings in Roman Catholic theology. The department of the Roman Curia which deals with questions of doctrine is called the Congregation for the Doctrine of the Faith.
  - The distinctive Calvinist doctrine of "double" predestination
  - The Methodist Church of Great Britain refers to the "doctrines to which the preachers of the Methodist Church are pledged" as doctrinal standards
- Yuga in Hinduism
- Postulation or Syādvāda in Jainism
- The Four Noble Truths in Buddhism

Roman Catholic and Orthodox doctrine generally comes from the writings of the Church Fathers, which has been clarified in various Ecumenical councils. Short versions can be found in brief statements of Christian doctrine, in prayer books. Longer versions take the form of catechisms. Protestants generally reject Christian tradition and instead derive their doctrine solely from the Bible.

== Philosophical usage ==
- Epicurus' 40 Principal Doctrines, the first four of which make up the Tetrapharmakos

== Measure of religiosity ==
According to sociologist Mervin Verbit, doctrine may be understood as one of the key components of religiosity. He divides doctrine into four categories: content, frequency (degree to which it may occupy the person's mind), intensity and centrality. Each of these may vary from one religion to the next, within that religious tradition.

In this sense, doctrine is similar to Charles Glock's "belief" dimension of religiosity.

== Military usage ==
The term doctrine also applies to the concept of an established procedure to execute an operation in warfare. The typical example is tactical doctrine in which a standard set of maneuvers, kinds of troops and weapons are employed as a default approach to a kind of attack.

Examples of military doctrines include:

- Guerre de course
- Hit-and-run tactics
- Mahanian of late 19th up to mid-20th century
- Manhunting doctrine, or assured individual destruction
- Shock and awe
- Soviet deep battle of World War II
- Trench warfare of World War I

== Cold War doctrines ==
The Cold War saw the enunciation of several strategic doctrines designed to contain Soviet expansion.

Carter Doctrine was announced in 1980 by American President Jimmy Carter after the Soviet invasion and occupation of Afghanistan. It declared that any Soviet aggression towards the Persian Gulf would be considered a danger to the essential interests of the United States. This led to the creation of significant American military installations in the area and the formation of the Rapid Deployment Force. The proclamation reinforced the previous Truman Doctrine and Eisenhower Doctrine and to some extent it rejected the Nixon Doctrine. See also Reagan Doctrine.

== Peacekeeping doctrines ==
In modern peacekeeping operations, which involve both civilian and military operations, more comprehensive (not just military) doctrines are now emerging such as the 2008 United Nations peacekeeping operations' "Capstone Doctrine" which speaks to integrated civilian and military operations.

== Political usage ==
By definition, political doctrine is "[a] policy, position or principle advocated, taught or put into effect concerning the acquisition and exercise of the power to govern or administrate in society." The term political doctrine is sometimes wrongly identified with political ideology. However, doctrine lacks the actional aspect of ideology. It is mainly a theoretical discourse, which "refers to a coherent sum of assertions regarding what a particular topic should be" (Bernard Crick). Political doctrine is based on a rationally elaborated set of values, which may precede the formation of a political identity per se. It is concerned with philosophical orientations on a meta-theoretical level.

== Legal usage ==
A legal doctrine is a body of interrelated rules (usually of common law and built over a long period of time) associated with a legal concept or principle. For example, the doctrine of frustration of purpose now has many tests and rules applicable with regard to each other and can be contained within a "bubble" of frustration. In a court session a defendant may refer to the doctrine of justification.

It can be seen that a branch of law contains various doctrines, which in turn contain various rules or tests. The test of non-occurrence of crucial event is part of the doctrine of frustration which is part of contract law. Doctrines can grow into a branch of law; restitution is now considered a branch of law separate to contract and tort.

== Doctor ==
The title of Doctor in fact means "one with the authority to establish doctrine in his or her respective field of study"; a doctorate is a terminal academic degree that legally confers said authority within its respective field. For more information, see Doctor (title).

== See also ==
- Betancourt Doctrine
- Bush Doctrine – Foreign policy principles of U.S. president George W. Bush
- Carter Doctrine – 1980 U.S. foreign policy
- Doxa – Greek word meaning common belief or popular opinion
- Dogma – Beliefs accepted by members of a group without question
- Drago Doctrine – 1902 Argentine policy on debt repayment
- Eisenhower Doctrine – American policy on the Middle East
- Giedroyc Doctrine – Political doctrine urging reconciliation among European countries
- Hallstein Doctrine – 1955–1970 one-Germany policy during the Cold War
- Monroe Doctrine – 1823 U.S. foreign policy on the Western Hemisphere
- Truman Doctrine – Anti-Soviet U.S. Cold War foreign policy
