= The City (Pidmohylny novel) =

1928 novel by Valerian Pidmohylnyi

- 1929 edition of the novel
- Author: Valerian Pidmohylny
- Original title: Місто
- Translator: Maxim Tarnawsky
- Language: Ukrainian
- Genre: Urban novel, philosophical novel
- Publisher: Knygospilka (in Ukrainian); Harvard University Press, Harvard Library of Ukrainian Literature (in English)
- Publication date: 1928
- Publication place: UkrSSR; USA
- English publication date: 2025
- Media type: Hardcover
- Pages: 300
- ISBN: 9780674291119

The City (Ukrainian: «Місто», romanized: 'Misto') is an urban novel by Ukrainian writer Valerian Pidmohylny, published in 1928. Its first English translation is The City, transl. with introduction by Maxim Tarnawsky. Harvard University Press, Harvard Library of Ukrainian Literature, 2025.

In this novel, Pidmohylny focuses on urban problems and touches upon philosophical questions of being. In this novel psyche of the characters is analyzed and the conflict takes place between people with different worldviews. Misto is the first urban novel in the Ukrainian literature, with new characters, issues and narrative style. At its core, the novel is a philosophical search for harmony in a world where our intellectual side expects rational order, whereas the instinctive natural world follows its own principles. The resulting alienation and disorientation reflect the basic principles of existential philosophy, in which Pidmohylnyi is close to his European counterparts of the day.

== History of writing ==
In the novel Valerian Pidmohylnyi described the Ukrainian peasant youth, who in the early 1920s went in thousands to the cities to conquer them, pour a fresh peasant blood into them, and liquidate the Ukrainian antagonism between the city and the country. The novel was not like a traditional populist prose of the 19th century because the European novel of the 19th – early 20th century guided the author. He learned tradition of Romance of Honoré de Balzac, Guy de Maupassant, Anatole France, Jack London, and domestic – Ahatanhel Krymsky, Volodymyr Vynnychenko.

== Features of plotline ==
The story presents the history of the Stepan Radchenko inner transformation. He is an energetic rural young man who arrives in Kyiv to get into the economic university and return with new knowledge. Initially, Stepan had nothing in the capital of Ukraine. He settles in the suburbs, where life is not very different from rural areas. Later, he moved closer to the center and rented a separate apartment. At the novel's end, he feels himself the owner of the city: "It lies humbly beneath wavy rocks, marked by points of fire, and stretches him from the darkness of the hills sharp stone fingers."

Stylistically, the story is Impressionism: from fragments of things, people, and sounds, the author portrays the city. As Stepan assimilates to Kyiv, his perception changes. The transformation is portrayed through the change in clothes. Initially, the bureau secretary advises Radchenko to change style: "All the Ukrainian woes are because of dressing badly." Upon visiting the store with fashionable and expensive clothes, Stepan still believes that it should only change his appearance, not personality. However, when he moves to a new house, Stepan burns his old clothes. During the novel, one can observe that Stephen rises the ladder of the city life. In Kyiv, he became interested in literature, began writing, and got famous. He was convinced that he went to conquer the city. Stepan thought the city needed "fresh blood of the village" that would change "its appearance and being."

Pidmohylnyi does not aim to make a documentary description of the writer's medium. He shows the author's birth, his successes and failures, and his wanderings in different worlds of the novel. The novel's last sentence ends at the instant when the story of Stepan Radchenko begins: "Then, in the silence of the lamp over the table, he wrote a story about people."

== Characters ==
- Stepan Radchenko – the protagonist
- Nadiia – a girl from the village
- Levko – a student
- Hanna and Niusia – Nadiia's friends
- Luka Hnidyi – a shopkeeper, who rents out to Stepan
- Tamara (Musinka) – a shopkeeper's wife, Stepan's mistress
- Maksym – a son of Tamara and shopkeeper
- Borys – a student, Stepan's friend
- Zoska – a city girl, Stepan's mistress
- Ryta – a ballerina
- Vyhorsky – a poet, Stepan's friend.

== See also ==
- List of Ukrainian-language writers
- Ukrainian literature
