= Kultura =

Former Polish literary magazine

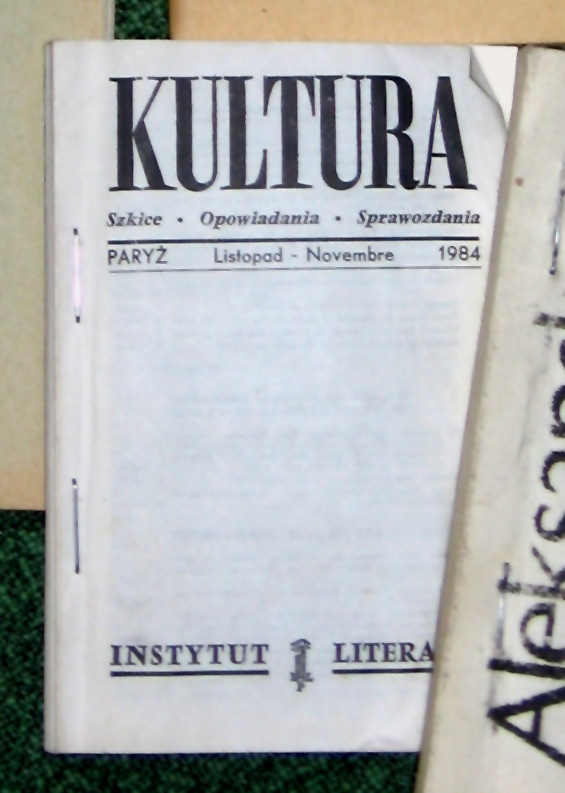
- 1984 cover of Kultura
- Editor: Jerzy Giedroyć
- Categories: Literature, politics
- Frequency: Monthly
- First issue: 1947
- Final issue: 2000
- Company: Instytut Literacki
- Country: Poland
- Based in: Paris, France; 91, avenue de Poissy 78600 Le Mesnil-le-Roi
- Language: Polish

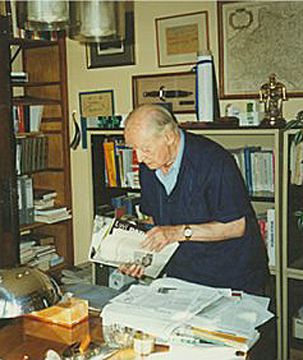
Jerzy Giedroyc, 1997

Kultura (Polish pronunciation: [kulˈtura], Culture)—sometimes referred to as Kultura Paryska ("Paris-based Culture")—was a leading Polish-émigré literary-political magazine, published from 1947 to 2000 by Instytut Literacki (the Literary Institute), initially in Rome and then in Paris. It was edited and produced by Jerzy Giedroyc and ceased publication upon his death.

== History ==
Giedroyc was one of the main reasons why Kultura enjoyed an unwavering prestige and a constant stream of esteemed contributors that enabled it to play a prominent role in Polish literary life. Kultura published polemics and articles, including those by Nobel Prize for Literature laureates Czesław Miłosz and Wisława Szymborska, as well as works by numerous other authors. Literary critics such as Maria Janion, Wojciech Karpiński, Jan Kott, and Ryszard Nycz also contributed. Kultura was and continues to be essential reading for students of Polish literature. Over the years it printed, and popularised the names of, many leading Polish writers and poets living under communism and as anti-communist political refugees throughout the Polish diaspora, such as Gustaw Herling-Grudziński, Witold Gombrowicz, Marek Hłasko, Juliusz Mieroszewski, Józef Czapski, Konstanty Jeleński, and Bogdan Czaykowski.

Kultura also played a major role in Poland's reconciliation with Ukraine, Belarus and Lithuania, as the first independent Polish intellectual circle to openly advocate, in the 1950s, recognizing Poland's postwar eastern borders. This involved renouncing Poland's claims to Lwów to a future independent Ukraine, and to Wilno to a future independent Lithuania. Kultura furthermore had a major role in Ukrainian literature publishing through the major work The Executed Renaissance, published by Ukrainian writer Yurii Lavrinenko with the support of Giedroyc. This book featured work by prominent Ukrainian writers and poets from the early period of Soviet Ukraine who were later arrested and executed in the 1930s.

The concept of supporting the independence of Poland's eastern neighbors, elaborated by Juliusz Mieroszewski and known as ULB ("Ukraine, Lithuania, Belarus")—and inspired by Józef Piłsudski's Interbellum Prometheist policy—has had a major influence on Poland's foreign policies since 1989.

== See also ==
- Polish literature
- Giedroyc Doctrine
- Mass media in Poland
- Category:People associated with Kultura (magazine)
