= Borys Antonenko-Davydovych =

Ukrainian writer (1899–1984)

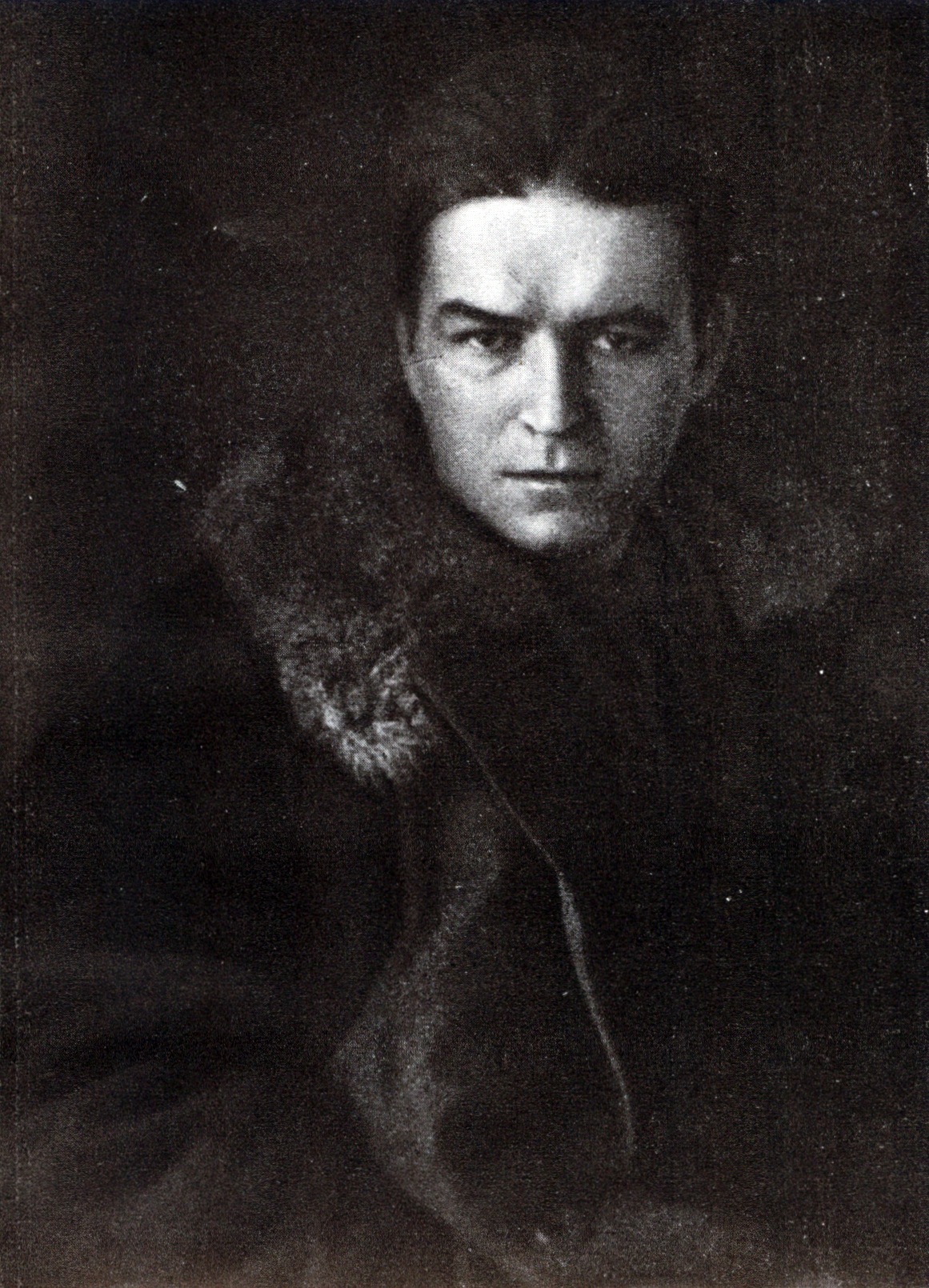
- photo, 1928
- Born: August 4 [O.S. July 23] 1899; Zasullya, Romensky Uyezd, Russian Empire
- Died: May 8, 1984 (age 84); Kyiv, Ukrainian SSR, Soviet Union
- Occupations: writer, translator
- Writing career
- Language: Ukrainian
- Genre: prose
- Notable awards: Shevchenko National Prize, 1992

Borys Antonenko-Davydovych (Ukrainian: Борис Антоненко-Давидович), born Borys Davydov (Ukrainian: Борис Давидов), was a Ukrainian writer, translator and linguist. During the Great Purge he was given a death sentence, later reduced to ten years jail in a gulag. Antonenko-Davydovych wrote a number of prose books; he had been translating from German and Russian. One of the most famous of his works is "How We speak" (Як ми говоримо) in which typical mistakes Ukrainian speakers made under the influence of Russian language are considered.

== Biography ==
Borys Antonenko-Davydovych was born on 4 August 1899 and grew in Bryansk, where his father, a hereditary honorary citizen, had moved from the outskirts of Romny. As a youth, Borys attended a gymnasium in Okhtyrka, and later studied at the universities of Kharkiv and Kyiv. During the Ukrainian War of Independence, in 1918-1919 Antonenko-Davydovych served in the Zaporizhian Corps under the command of Petro Bolbochan, and was appointed commandant of Melitopol.

After the end of the war Antonenko-Davydovych settled in Kyiv, where he belonged to the MARS literary society (from Ukrainian МАРС - Майстерня Революційного Слова - "Workshop of the Revolutionary Word") along with Yevhen Pluzhnyk, Valerian Pidmohylny and Hryhorii Kosynka. His literary group took left revolutionary positions, but differed from proletarian writers due to its emphasis on quality writing. MARS was widely perceived to be the Kyiv branch of VAPLITE.

During the Ukrainian Famine of 1933 Antonenko-Davydovych travelled from Kyiv to Poltava on bicycle together with authors Valerian Pidmohylny, Ivan Bahriany and Borys Teneta. After the suicides of Mykola Khvylyovy and Mykola Skrypnyk, which were followed by the start of government repressions against Ukrainian authors, Antonenko-Davydovych moved to Kazakhstan, but in 1935 was arrested and sentenced to 10 years of labour camps for his writings and reports skeptical of Communist doctrines. After fulfilling his term, he returned to Kyiv, but was once again detained and exiled for life to Krasnoyarsk Krai. Three years after the death of Stalin, in 1956, Antonenko-Davydovych was finally rehabilitated.

Being one of the few surviving members of the "Executed Renaissance" generation, after his liberation from imprisonment Antonenko-Davydovych had a big influence on the Sixtiers and the dissident movement. His refusal to serve as a witness in the trial of Valentyn Moroz led to his workes being banned from print.

== Works ==
In his 1967 essay Why I write in Ukrainian? Antonenko-Davydovych opposed the adoption of Russian as the main language of literature in all Soviet republics, and promoted the value of native language for creative self-realization. His 1970 book How We Speak was dedicated to speaking culture and criticized the use of calques from Russian in Ukrainian speech.

His novel Behind the Curtain (Ukrainian: За ширмою), which emerged in 1961 during the Khrushchev Thaw, depicted the assimilatory policy of Soviet authorities in Uzbekistan being performed with the hands of Ukrainians, who had themselves been assimilated. Antonenko-Davydovych's Siberian Novellas, containing memoirs of his imprisonment, could only be published in 1989.

== See also ==
- List of Ukrainian-language writers
- List of Ukrainian literature translated into English

== Sources ==
- Юрій Лавріненко. Розстріляне відродження: Антологія 1917–1933. — Київ: Смолоскип, 2004. (in Ukrainian)
