= Cherkassy uezd =

Subdivision of the Tsarist Kiev Governorate

Cherkassy uezd Черкасский уезд
- Uezd
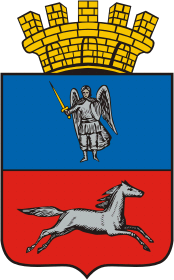
- Coat of arms

- Location in the Kiev Governorate
- Country: Russian Empire
- Krai: Southwestern
- Governorate: Kiev
- Established: 1797
- Abolished: 1923
- Capital: Cherkassy

Area
  - Total: 3,600 km^{2} (1,400 sq mi)

Population (1897)
  - Total: 307,542
  - Density: 85/km^{2} (220/sq mi)

The Cherkassy uezd (Russian: Черкасский уезд, romanized: Cherkasskiy uyezd; Ukrainian: Черкаський повіт, romanized: Cherkas'kyi povit) was one of the subdivisions of the Kiev Governorate of the Russian Empire. It was situated in the southeastern part of the governorate. Its administrative centre was Cherkassy (Cherkasy).

== Demographics ==
At the time of the Russian Empire Census of 1897, Cherkassky Uyezd had a population of 279,695. Of these, 84.9% spoke Ukrainian, 9.8% Yiddish, 4.2% Russian, 0.4% Polish, 0.4% Belarusian, 0.1% German and 0.1% Romani as their native language.
