= Jerzy Giedroyc =

Polish writer and activist (1906–2000)

Jerzy Giedroyć
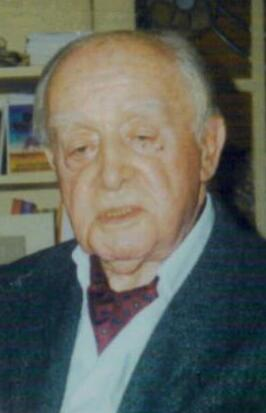
- Giedroyć in 1999
- Born: Jerzy Władysław Giedroyć; 27 July 1906; Minsk, Russian Empire
- Died: 14 September 2000 (aged 94); Maisons-Laffitte, France
- Resting place: Le Mesnil-le-Roi
- Education: University of Warsaw
- Writing career
- Language: Polish
- Genre: Publicist
- Subjects: Politics and literature
- Notable work: Editor of Kultura
- Literary movement: Independence

Jerzy Władysław Giedroyć (Polish pronunciation: [ˈjɛʐɨ ˈɡʲɛdrɔjt͡ɕ]; 27 July 1906 – 14 September 2000) was a Polish writer and political activist. For many years, he worked as editor of the highly influential Paris-based periodical, Kultura.

== Early life ==
Giedroyć was born in Minsk, into a Polish-Lithuanian noble family on 27 July 1906, with the title of kniaź, prince. His schooling in Moscow was interrupted by the October Revolution, when he returned home to Minsk. During the Polish–Soviet War of 1919–1921 his family left Minsk for Warsaw, where he finished the Jan Zamoyski gymnasium in 1924. He went on to study law and Ukrainian history and literature at the University of Warsaw.

== Career ==
Giedroyć worked as a journalist and civil servant in interwar Poland, he maintained contacts with leading Ukrainians and urged the Roman Catholic Church to improve relations with the Greek Catholic Church to which many Ukrainians belonged, insisting that Poland's success as a national state depended on satisfying the aspirations of minorities so that minority nationalists would not have convincing arguments against Polish statehood. He thus took the side of Józef Piłsudski against the National Democrats.

In 1930 he took over as editor of the weekly "Dzień Akademicki" (Academic Day) which he soon transformed into the biweekly "Bunt Młodych", renaming it Polityka in 1937.

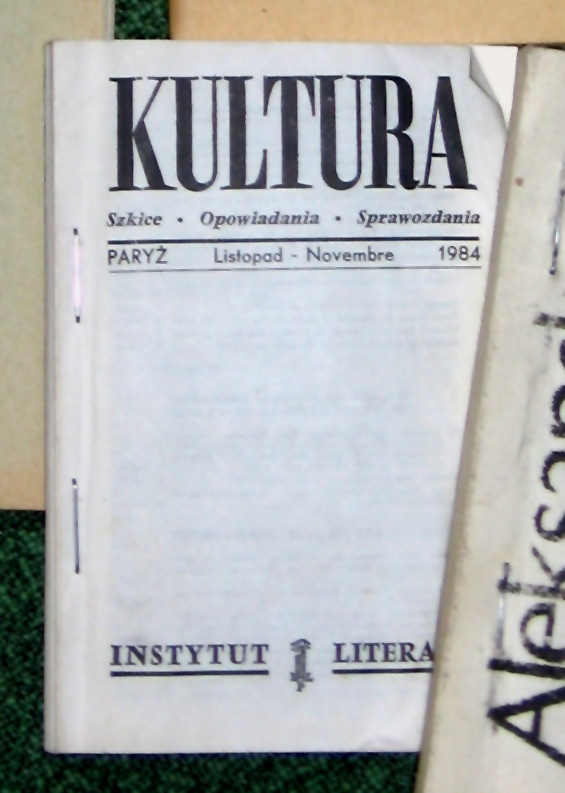
A 1984 copy of Kultura

During World War II he served under General Władysław Anders in the Polish Army and kept up friendly contacts with representatives of other nationalities. After the war he moved to Paris, where he published and edited a leading Polish-émigré literary-political journal, Kultura (1947–2000), which promoted a peaceful settlement of Poland's eastern borders, and accepted the results of the Molotov–Ribbentrop Pact and the Yalta Conference, the (Giedroyc-Mieroszewski doctrine), even though many Poles regarded these as betrayals of Poland. This helped to lay the groundwork for Poland's successful eastern policy after the fall of communism. His closest collaborator was Juliusz Mieroszewski, who provided the theoretical justification for Polish recognition of the borders with Ukraine, Belarus, and Lithuania (whose future independence he predicted long before it came about).

== Death and remembrance ==
He died of heart attack on 14 September 2000 in Maisons-Laffitte, Yvelines, Île-de-France, France.

In 2006 the Polish Sejm declared the year 2006 as the "Year of Jerzy Giedroyć".

== Awards and honours ==
- Order of the Crown of Romania, Romania (1930)
- Order of the White Star, Estonia (1932)
- Order of the Crown, Belgium (1938)
- Honorary degree of the Jagiellonian University, Poland (1991)
- Kisiel Prize, Poland (1992)
- Order of the White Eagle, Poland (rejected, 1994)
- Legion of Honour, France (1996)
- Order of the Lithuanian Grand Duke Gediminas, Lithuania (1998)
- Order of Merit, Ukraine (1998)

== See also ==
- Giedroyc Doctrine
- Jerzy Giedroyc Literary Award
