= Mykola Zerov =

Ukrainian writer and scholar

- Микола Зеров
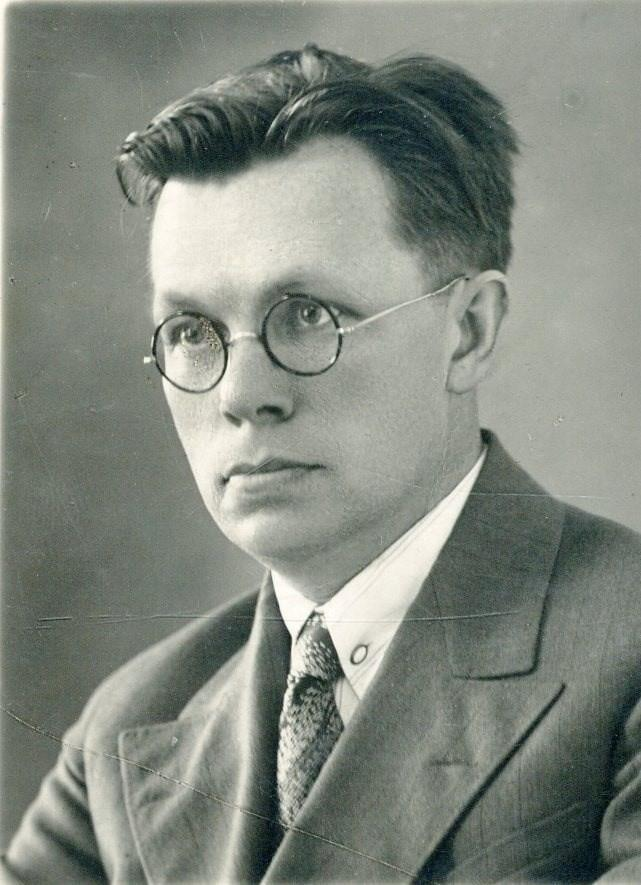
- Born: 26 April 1890; Zinkiv, Poltava Governorate, Russian Empire
- Died: 3 November 1937 (aged 47); Sandarmokh, Karelian ASSR, Russian SFSR, Soviet Union
- Occupations: Poet; translator; scholar; critic
- Known for: Leading figure of the Executed Renaissance, Neoclassicist poet

Mykola Kostiantynovych Zerov (Ukrainian: Микола Костянтинович Зеров; 26 April 1890 – 3 November 1937) was a Ukrainian poet, translator, classical and literary scholar and critic. He is considered to be one of the leading figures of the Executed Renaissance.

== Early life and education ==
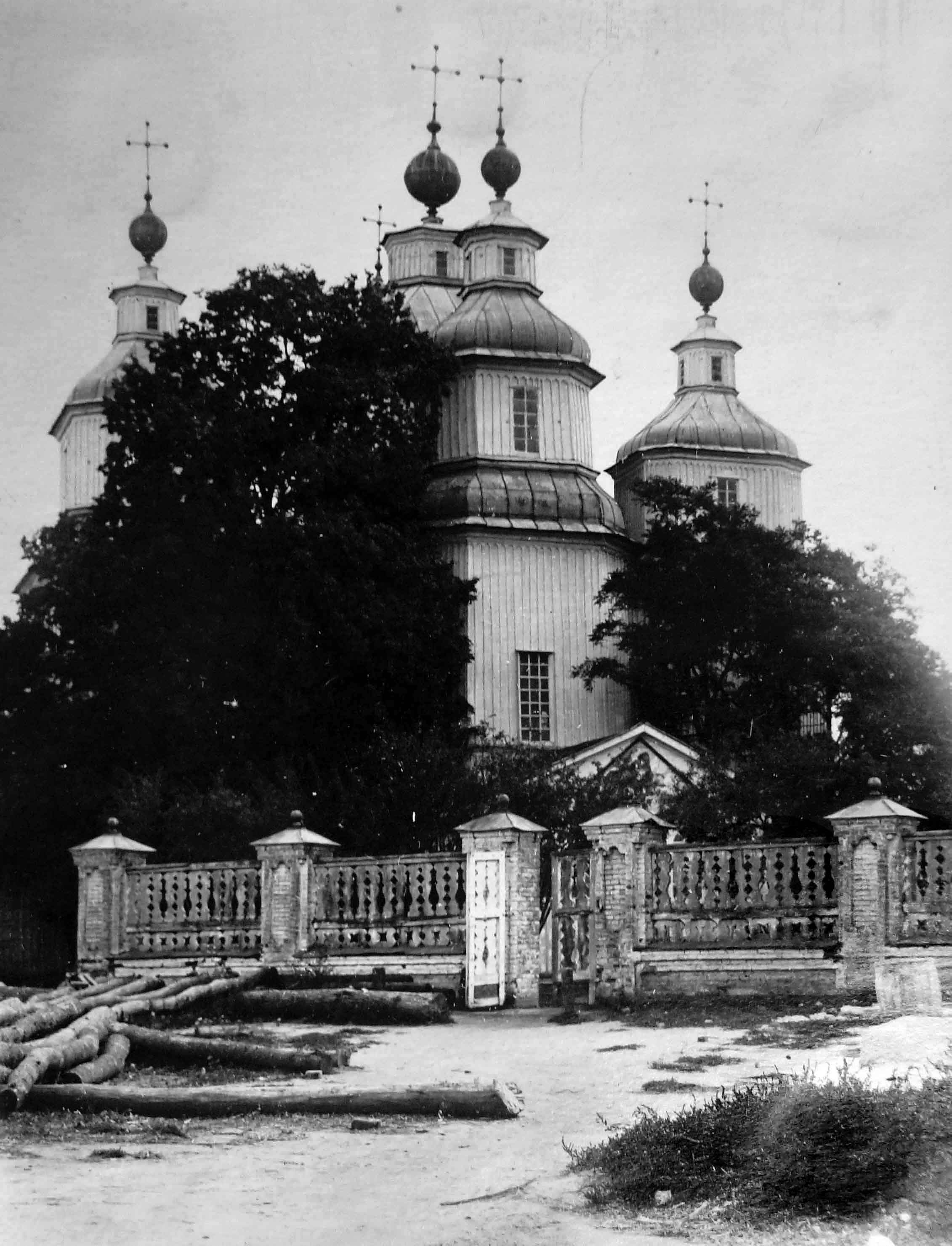
A church in Zinkiv (c. 1930), which is the town that Zerov was born in 1890.

Zerov was born on 26 April 1890 in the town of Zinkiv, which was then part of the Poltava Governorate in the Russian Empire (now in Poltava Oblast, Ukraine). He was the eldest of eleven children born to Kostyantyn Zerov and Maria Yakivna. Kostyantyn was of peasant origin from Bryansk, and after graduating from the Hlukhiv Teacher’s Institute, became a teacher at the Zinkiv Women's Gymnasium and an inspector of public schools. It was through him that Mykola became interested in literature, as Kostyantyn wrote "Stories for Children", although Kostyantyn considered himself Russian and demanded that the entire family speak the Russian language. Mykola's mother, Maria, was from the landowning Yaresko family from Dykanka and of Cossack lineage, and who, during Mykola's youth, told stories about Ukrainian folk songs and spoke Ukrainian around the children.

After studying in Zinkiv for elementary school, alongside fellow future Ukrainian writer Ostap Vyshnya, he then studied at the gymnasium in Okhtyrka, the Okhtyrka Male Gymnasium. At Okhtyrk, he developed a deep interest in history under his teacher M. Popov, and the memories of which would later inspire his sonnet "Vodnik". In 1903, however, Kostyantyn was appointed as inspector of a school in Pereiaslav, so the family then moved to the city of Kyiv and Mykola was enrolled in the First Kyiv Gymnasium, where he graduated from in 1908. During his gymnasium years, despite the ongoing protests at the time against the Russian government, he was described as indifferent and a "thing-in-itself". He also frequently visited Krolevets, after his father moved there for work two years later in 1905, and was the place he initiated the "Krolevets Brotherhood" and started a magazine. In 1909, he started studying philology at Saint Vladimir University in Kyiv. At the university, he attended the philosophical seminars of Volodymyr Peretts, which shaped his aesthetic taste and philosophical discipline later in his career. He also started to experience his "first impressions" of contemporary Ukrainian poetry by Oleksandr Oles, and thus in October 1909 attended a literary evening at the Ukrainian Club. He would later become a strong defender of Oles's work, whom he felt a deep connection to, and in winter 1909 again joined the Ukrainian Club to defend Oles's work, which he considered flawless. Due to this, he eventually became a leader in the Ukrainian student community, even delivering a farewell speech for the funeral of Borys Hrinchenko. He graduated in 1912, writing the research paper "The Grabianka Chronicle as a Historical Source and Literary Monument".

== Literary works ==
During the years 1911-1913, during and after his graduation from the university, he became part of the "Inseparable Krolevets Trio" with Petro Horetsky and Viktor Romanovsky. Together, they worked on a collective manuscript entitled the "Zaporozhians of the 20th Century", which was a "Sich chronicle" about their experiences in Ukraine, with Zerov being the primary compiler. The manuscript was around 55 pages long, but was eventually lost in 1918. In addition to their manuscript, they organized a youth Cossack camp near the village of Kamin (now in Sumy Oblast), which consisted of about 100 members. Zerov served as the chronicler for the camp, telling stories about the Cossacks.

In addition to his work with the trio, he was also probably the author of the appeal "For a Ukrainian University", which was published in 1912, where he called for the establishment of a Ukrainian-language university in the city of Lviv, and expressed solidarity against Chauvinism opposition. In the journalistic field, he started publishing regularly in the pedagogical magazine Svitlo (Light) and the newspaper Rada (Council). He also wrote his own works such as the ode "To Three Travelers", dedicated to his trio where he identified himself and the group as "bibliophages" (book-eaters).

From 1917 to 1920, he edited the bibliographical journal. He was a professor of Ukrainian literature at the Kyiv Architectural Institute (1918–1920), the Kyiv Co-operative Tekhnikum (1923–1925), and the Kyiv Institute of People's Education (1923–1935). He also taught the theory of translation at the Ukrainian Institute of Linguistic Education (1930–1933).

Mykola Zerov was perhaps the most talented of the Neoclassicist movement of poets in the 1920s Ukraine. Despite Communist demands that all creative works conform to socialist realism, the neoclassicist movement stressed the production of 'high art' for an educated and highly literate audience. Zerov, particularly, eschewed contemporary politics in his poetry, focusing on aesthetic and historical classical themes under a tight and difficult poetical structure.

== Troika and execution ==
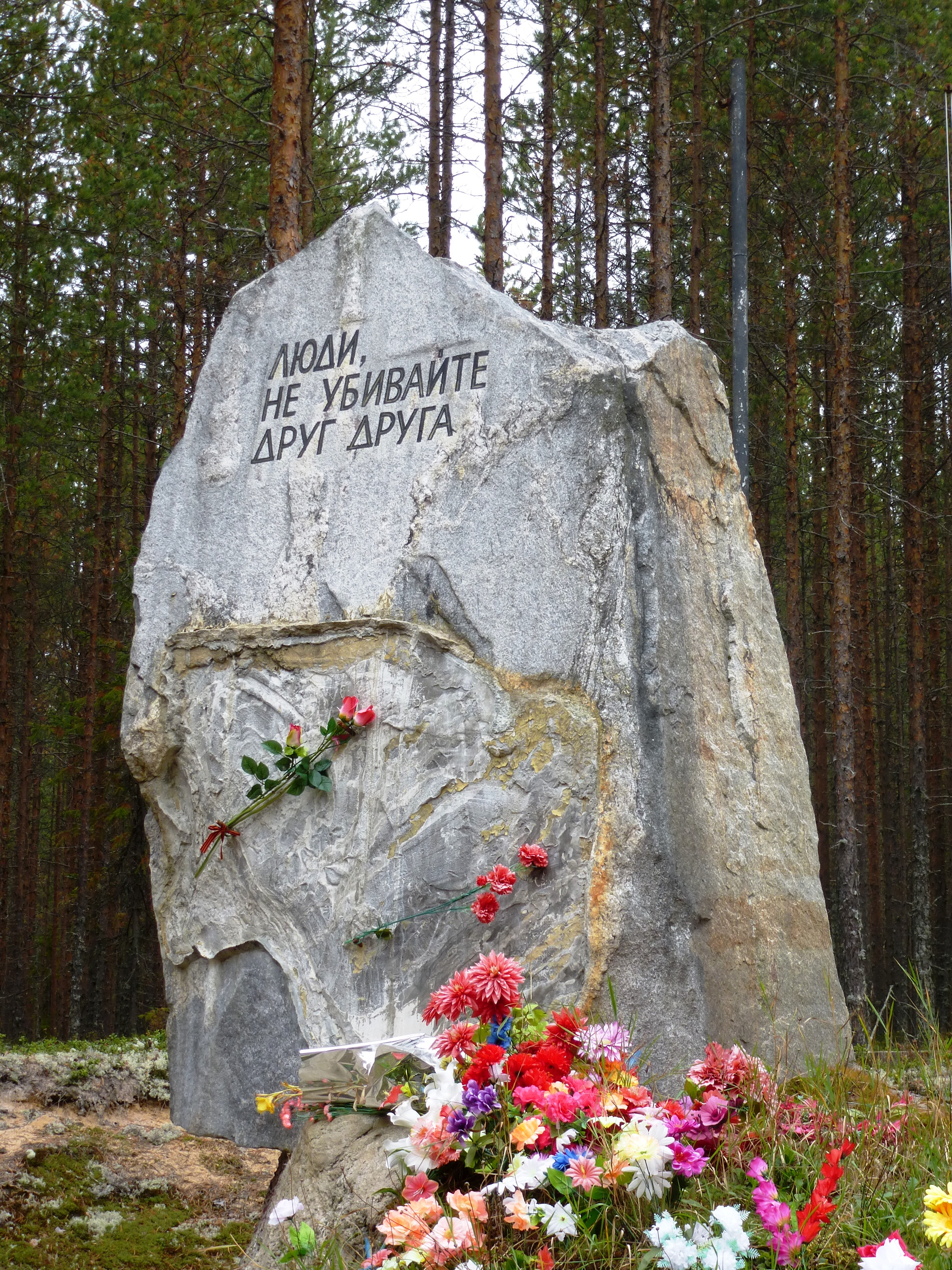
A monument at the village of Sandarmokh for the victims of the Great Purge executed there, including Zerov, which read "People, do not kill each other".

Zerov was arrested on the night of 27-28 April 1935 at the Pushkino railway station near Moscow by the NKVD. He was then transported to Kyiv on fabricated charges of leading a counter-revolutionary nationalist terrorist organization, which was stated to have the intent of overthrowing the Soviet government in order to establish an independent Ukrainian republic. During the investigation following his arrest, Zerov's house was searched, where authorities seized items that were found to be incriminating, including a copy of the book "Polityka" which was autographed by Hryhorii Kosynka (who was executed in 1934 and whose works were labeled nationalist and banned prior to Zerov's arrest), a copy of "Chorna Rada" by Panteleimon Kulish (whose works were also banned), and correspondence letters with an individual who was labeled as an exile.

Subsequently, during a July 1935 interrogation by the NKVD, Zerov was pressured into admitting a statement of guilt by confirming that his goal was to protect Ukrainian writers and cultural workers from so-called "Sovietization", which the state labeled as nationalism. In February 1936, after months of imprisonment, he was sentenced in a closed session of the Military Tribunal of the Kyiv Military District to ten years of imprisonment in a corrective-labor camp with the confiscation of all his property. He was then sent to the Solovki prison camp, but abruptly on 9 October 1937, Zerov's case was reconsidered by a special NKVD troika of the Leningrad Oblast. The troika changed his original sentence with the death penalty, and he was subsequently shot in the village of Sandarmokh on 3 November 1937, alongside other representatives of the Ukrainian intelligentsia. Following this, the Soviet government sought to cover up his death, and a falsified death certificate was issued to Zerov's wife stating he died on 13 October 1941 in Solovki of "cardiovascular paralysis".

Zerov was formally rehabilitated in 1958 by the Supreme Court of the USSR for a "lack of crime", and selections of his poetry were published in 1966, but a full rehabilitation was blocked by hostility from official critics.

== Memory ==
Streets were named after Zerov in Dnipro, Lviv, Vinnytsia, Rivne, Novomyrhorod. In 2020 Kyiv's Nikolai Ostrovsky Park was renamed Mykola Zerov Park (to comply with the 2015 Ukrainian decommunization laws).

The University of Melbourne appoints a Mykola Zerov Fellow in Ukrainian Studies.
