= Yevhen Pluzhnyk =

Ukrainian poet and playwright (1898–1936)

Yevhen Pluzhyk
- Євген Плужник
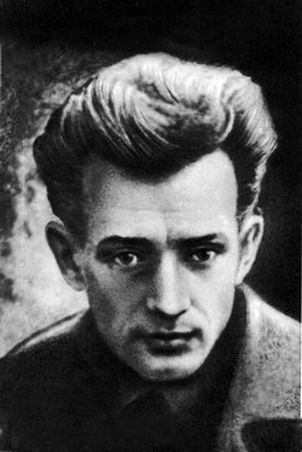
- Born: Dec 14 [O.S. Dec 26] 1898; Kantemirovka, Voronezh Governorate, Russian Empire
- Died: February 2, 1936 (aged 37); Solovki, RSFSR, USSR
- Resting place: Baikove Cemetery (nominal grave)
- Citizenship: Russian Empire→UPR→USSR
- Occupations: poet, playwright and translator
- Partner: Halyna Kovalenko (1923–1936)
- Writing career
- Pen name: Кантемирянин (tr. Kantemyrianyn 'a human from Kantemirovka')
- Language: Ukrainian
- Years active: 1924–1936

Yevhen Pavlovych Pluzhnyk (Ukrainian: Плужник Євген Павлович; 26 December [O.S. 14 December] 1898, Kantemirovka, Voronezh Governorate, Russian Empire — 2 February 1936, Solovki, USSR) was a Ukrainian poet, playwright and translator.

== Biography ==
Pluzhnyk was born in sloboda Kantemirovka located in the historical region of Sloboda Ukraine. His father was from Poltava.

Pluzhnyk was studying at Voronezh gymnasium for several years until he was ejected from it because of his participating in illegal circles. After that he continued to study in Rostov-on-Don and Bobrov. In 1918 his family moved to Poltava region, where Pluzhnyk worked as a teacher of language and literature.

He studied at Kyiv Zootechic Institute, where his sister's husband worked. Then he stopped studying to become an actor. From 1921 Pluzhnyk studied at a Kyiv musical-dramatic institute named after Mykola Lysenko, where famous professor Volodymyr Sladkopevtsev taught. Despite success in studying, Pluzhnyk had to leave it due to tuberculosis. From 1924 he actively participated in the literature organization «Lanka» (Link).

In 1926 Pluzhnyk's disease worsened, but the writer survived. He was under medical treatment in Vorzel; also he continued rehabilitation in Crimea or the Caucasus two times a year. From 1923 Pluzhnyk worked as a translator at desks, continuing self-education and writing poems in the evenings.

On 4 December 1934 Pluzhnyk was arrested by NKVD and charged with participating in a nationalistic terror organization. In March 1935 offsite Military Collegium of the Supreme Court of the Soviet Union sentenced Pluzhnyk, Epik, Kulish, Pidmohylny, and others to be shot. Then this sentence was replaced by long-term incarceration on Solovki, where the poet died due to tuberculosis. His last words were «Я вмиюся, пригадаю Дніпро і вмру» ("I will wash, will remember Dnipro and will die.") Yevhen Pluzhnyk was buried in a camp cemetery, his grave is not saved.

Pluzhnyk was rehabilitated in August 1956. His nominal grave is in Baikove Cemetery, part No.9.

== Literature activity ==
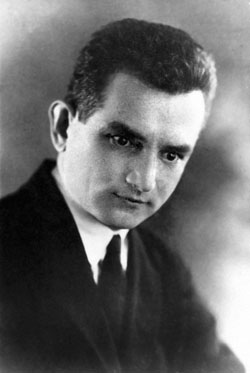
Yevhen Pluzhnyk in the 1920s

Yevhen Pluzhnyk started writing at the beginning of the 1920s. His first works were published in 1924. He became a literator due to Yuriy Mezhenko, whose estimate of the poet's talent and joined him in a session of Aspys. Pluzhyk's poetry was highly evaluated by M. Rylsky, M. Zerov, and M. Bazhan.

Pluzhnyk printed his works in magazines Hlobus (The Globe), Nova Hromada (The New Community), Chervony Shliakh (The Red Route), «Zhyttia y Revoliutsia» (The Life and the Revolution). In the mid-1920s he published his first poetic albums Dni (Days, 1926) and Rannia Osin (The Early Autumn, 1927).

Pluzhnyk's poetry is characterised by the lyricism and dramatism of feelings, as well as masterful poetic language.

Yevhen Pluzhnyk took part in «Aspys» (1923–1924) and «Lanka» (from 1926 — «MARS»). In «Lanka» he opposed Todos Osmachka, in the literature of that time Pluzhnyk was an opponent to Volodymyr Sosiura.

Pluzhnyk with V. Atamaniuk and F. Yakubosky worked at Anthology of Ukrainian Poetry (1930–1932).

He translated into Ukrainian Gogol's Nevsky Prospekt and Marriage, Chekhov's Flatterers and Thief, Sholokhov's And Quiet Flows the Don, Tolstoi's Childhood and Boyhood, Gorky's The Artamonov Business.

Pluzhnyk is author of poetic album Rivnovaha («Equilibrium», 1933; published in 1948 in Augsburg and in 1966 in Ukraine), novel Neduha(«Illness», 1928; the alternative name — Siayvo «Shining»), plays Professor Sukhorab (1929), On the Yard of Suburb (1929), Bog (text is unknown). Also, he created a play in verses A Plot in Kyiv (other names — Saboteurs, Brothers), which had been put on by Ivan Franko Theatre (producer Kost Koshevsky) and Les Kurbas' «Berezil».

Also, Pluzhnyk created a poem for Pidmohulny's story The Third Revolution. He wrote some scripts for VUFKU, but they were not accepted. Their destiny is unknown.

Yehen Pluzhnyk and Valerian Pidmohylny created a dictionary Phraseology of Business Language (1926, 1927).

== Family ==
In 1923 Yevhen Pluzhnyk married with Halyna Kovalenko. In 1943 she moved to Lviv, then to Germany and last time – to the United States. Kovalenko had written memoir about poet. Her sisters Mariia Yurkova and Taiisia Kovalenko was saving remembrance about Yevhen Pluzhnyk, promote of his rehabilitation and republication of his works.

== Remembrance about Yevhen Pluzhnyk ==
- From 1992 Central District Library of Shevchenkivskyi District of city of Kyiv was named after Yevhen Pluzhnyk.
- There is commemorative plaque on the house on Prorizna Str., 18/1 (Shevchenkivskyi District, Kiyv), where Yevhen Pluzhnyk was living in 1923–1934 (sculptor – O. I. Chobotar, architect – O. K. Stukalov).

== Literature and sources ==
- Г. П. Герасимова. Плужник Євген Павлович// Енциклопедія історії України : у 10 т. / редкол.: В. А. Смолій (голова) та ін.; Інститут історії України НАН України. — К. : Наук. думка, 2011. — Т. 8 : Па — Прик. — С. 278. — ISBN 978-966-00-1142-7.(in Ukrainian)

=== Literature ===
- ЕУ — Т. 6. — С. 2111.
- В. В. Оліфіренко, С. М. Оліфіренко. Слобожанська хвиля. Навчальний посібник-хрестоматія з української літератури Північної Слобожанщини. Донецьк: Східний видавничий дім, 2005. — 280 с.
- Борис Антоненко-Давидович. Здалека й зблизька. «Недоспівана пісня ранньої осені». Київ, 1969. С.158–173. (Нарис про Євгена Плужника).
- Ігор Роздобудько. Євген Плужник, та його вшанування на Східній Слобожанщині. // Східна Слобожанщина. Українці навколо України.(in Ukrainian)
