= Hryhorii Kosynka =

Ukrainian writer (1899–1934)

- Григорій Косинка
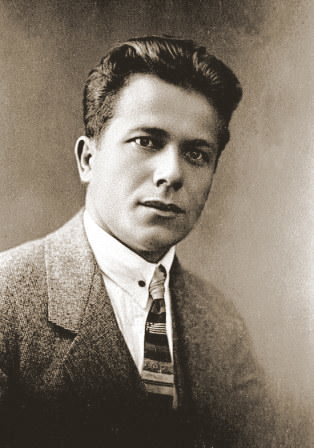
- Born: Григорій Михайлович Стрілець; Hryhorii Mykhailovych Strilets; 29 November 1899; Shcherbanivka, Kiev uezd, Kiev Governorate, Russian Empire (now Ukraine)
- Died: 15 December 1934 (aged 35); Kyiv, Ukrainian SSR, USSR
- Spouse: Tamara Moroz-Strilets (m. 1924)

Hryhorii Mykhailovych Kosynka (né Strilets; Ukrainian: Григорій Михайлович Косинка; 29 November 1899 – 15 December 1934) was a Ukrainian and Soviet writer and translator. Executed by the Soviet authorities, Kosynka is considered part of the Executed Renaissance.

== Biography ==
Hryhorii Strelets was born in 1899 in the selo of Shcherbanivka, Kiev uezd (Present-day, Obukhiv Raion, Kyiv Oblast) to a peasant family. He completed a two-year school, and moved to Kiev in 1914. There, taking various jobs to get subsistence, he graduated from a six-year school. Eventually, Strelets started writing short prose. He first used the pseudonym Hryhorii Kosynka in 1919.

During the Russian Civil War, he first fought with the Green Ataman and then with the army of the Ukrainian People's Republic. Both were fighting against the Bolsheviks, and Kosynka was even briefly jailed when the Bolsheviks won, but then released.

Between 1919 and 1922 Kosynka studied at the Institute of National Education. At the same time, he was writing for various newspapers and magazines in Kyiv, as well as speaking on radio and collaborating with the film studio. Kosynka was appointed the director of Kharkiv and Kiev radio committees.

Between 1922 and 1933, Kosynka published seven books of prose. He also made a number of translations from Russian. He was one of the founders of the writers association Lanka, which in 1926 was renamed to The Workshop of Revolutionary Literature. He wrote in Ukrainian.

4 November 1934 Kosynka was arrested and charged with counterrevolutionary activity. He was sentenced to death penalty and executed together with a group of Ukrainian writers which included Dmytro Falkivskyi. In 1957, he was posthumously rehabilitated.

== Personal life ==
In 1924, Kosynka married Tamara Moroz-Strilets (née Moroz).

== Books ==
- Na Zolotykh Bogiv (На Золотих Богів, 1922)
- Za vorotmi (За воротьми, 1925)
- V zhytakh (В житах,1926)
- Polityka (Політика, 1927)
- Vybrani opovdannia (Вибрані оповідання, 1928)
- Tsyrkul (Циркуль, 1930)
- Sertse (Серце, 1933).
