= Valerian Pidmohylny =

Ukrainian novelist

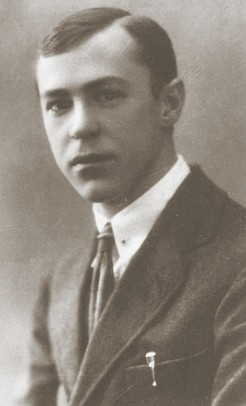
- Born: 2 February 1901; Chapli, Russian Empire
- Died: 3 November 1937 (aged 36); Sandarmokh, Karelian ASSR, USSR
- Occupations: Novelist, short story writer, translator, literary critic
- Writing career
- Notable works: The City, A Little Touch of Drama

Valerian Petrovych Pidmohylny (Ukrainian: Валер'ян Петрович Підмогильний, Ukrainian pronunciation: [ʋɐlerˈjɑn petˈrɔwɪt͡ʃ pʲidmoˈɦɪlʲnɪi̯]; 2 February 1901 - 3 November 1937) was a Ukrainian modernist, most famous for his novel The City (Ukrainian: Місто, romanized: Misto). Like a number of Ukrainian writers, he flourished in the 1920s Ukraine, but in the 1930s, he was constrained and eventually arrested by the NKVD on fabricated charges of terrorism. He was executed in Sandarmokh in 1937, during the Great Purge. He is one of the leading figures of the Executed Renaissance.

1929 edition of Misto

== Biography ==
Pidmohylny was born in Ekaterinoslav Governorate (now Dnipropetrovsk Oblast, Ukraine). His father was a manager for a large landowner. He learned French as a child and continued his efforts, eventually becoming a major translator of French literature into Ukrainian, in particular the works of Anatole France and Guy de Maupassant.

His early adult life is sketchy, but there is a slight indication that he was a supporter of Symon Petliura, the military commander of the short-lived independent Ukraine created after the Soviet Revolution.

A year after Pidmohylnyi's debut, he moved to the town of Vorzel, next to Kyiv, where he started work as a teacher and an interpreter. This allowed him to earn money for a living since, all of a sudden, he faced problems with the publication of his texts. Living in Kyiv but having difficulty publishing some of his stories in 1923, he was able to secure publication in the anti-Soviet émigré journal Nova Ukraina. This created disagreements with other Ukrainian writers, including Mykola Khvylovy, one of the leading writers of the period.

Pidmohylny published a wide number of stories in the next several years after having been "exonerated" by the major Ukrainian journal Chervonyi shliakh. He also participated in the literary group Lanka tied to the journal Zhyttia i revoliutsiia. In addition to prose fiction and translations, he also published several critical essays, and is considered one of the pioneers of Freudian criticism in Ukraine.

The period of 1924-1930 became Pidmohylnyi's time to write himself into the story. He was occupied with editorial work, translation, and research of Ukrainian authors Ivan Nechuy-Levytsky and Maksym Rylsky. Most importantly, the power of community gave him fresh strength for writing new works. As a result, he released a new collection of stories, “The Problem of Bread,” in 1927.

In 1927, at the age of 26, Pidmohylny won recognition as a major author with the publication of his novel Misto (The City), which was also translated into Russian.

In 1929, the writer continued to work on translations. He was removed as the Editor of “Life and Revolution” and, afterward, barely got a chance to join the Kyiv Writers Committee. No, not as a writer, editor, or translator, but as a co-leader of a sports club in The Kyiv City House Of Culture.

As harsh Stalinism solidified in Ukraine, Pidmohylny had increasing difficulty publishing his work, especially magnified because of questions about his commitment to the Soviet system. In 1934, he was arrested. Valerian Pidmohylnyi was accused of affiliation with a counterrevolutionary organization that planned assassination attempts on the Сommunist Party leaders. The case was used against 17 other writers, including Hryhoriy Epik, who testified that Pidmohylnyi planned to personally kill one of the organizers of 1932-1933 Holodomor, Pavlo Postyshev. Epik and Pidmohylnyi testified against each other during an organized confrontation. Pidmohylnyi denied all the accusations made against him.

After being tortured and forced to sign absurd confessions, he was sentenced to the Solovki prison camp and shot in Sandarmokh, Karelia.

In 1956, the wife of Valerian Pidmohynlyi, Kateryna Chervinska, sent a request to the KGB to inform her whether her husband was still alive. The last letter from him was dated 1937. Kateryna received Valerian Pidmohylnyi's death certificate with the date and reason of his death — liver cancer, 1941. In reality, the writer was executed in 1937 according to a repeated sentence of NKVD.

After Stalin's death, Pidmohylny was partially rehabilitated in 1956.

Misto and some other stories were republished in Ukraine in 1989. A selection of stories, including some previously never published, appeared in 1991 as Istoriia pani Ïvhy (The Story of Mrs Ivha).

== Major works ==
=== The City ===
The novel Misto is the story of a young man thrust into the violent sights and smells of an urban environment and has been translated into English.

=== A Little Touch of Drama ===
The novel A Little Touch of Drama (Ukrainian: Невеличка драма, romanized: Nevelychka drama), originally only published in serialization, describes the character types of a number of men who compete for the love of one woman. One of her primary admirers is a scientist, and a major theme is the tension between the administration of reason-based science and human emotional life. It is available in English translation.

== English translations ==
- A Little Touch of Drama, translated by George S. N. Luckyj and Moira Luckyj. Ukrainian Academic Press (Libraries Unlimited). Littleton, Colorado, 1972, ISBN 0872870510.
- "Vania" / M.T. Journal of Ukrainian Studies. 10.2 (Winter 1985): 49–51, Toronto. Translated by Maxim Tarnawsky.
- "In the Infirmary". In Before the Storm: Soviet Ukrainian Fiction of the 1920s. Translated by Yuri Tkacz, edited by George S. N. Luckyj. Ann Arbor: Ardis, 1986, ISBN 0882335219.
- "The Haydamaka", "The Military Pilot" and "The Third Revolution". In Conflict and Chaos: Ukrainian Male Authors 1905-1933. Edited by Paul Cipywnyk. Language Lanterns, Toronto, 2010. ISBN 0973598298.
- The City, translated with introduction by Maxim Tarnawsky. Harvard University Press, Harvard Library of Ukrainian Literature, 2024, ISBN 9780674291119.

== See also ==
- The City (novel)
- List of Ukrainian-language writers
- Ukrainian literature
