= Vsesvit =

Vsesvit Всесвіт
- "Vsesvit": Journal of Foreign Literature
- Editor: Dmytro Drozdovskyi
- Categories: World literature
- Frequency: 3 times a year
- Founder: Vasyl Ellan-Blakytny
- First issue: 1925
- Company: "Vsesvit" publishing house
- Country: Ukraine
- Based in: 6-А, Zolotovoritska St., Kyiv
- Language: Ukrainian
- Website: vsesvit-journal.com
- ISSN: 0320-8370

Vsesvit (Ukrainian: Всесвіт pronounced [ˈu̯sɛs⁽ʲ⁾wit] , lit. ''Universe'') is a Ukrainian periodical that publishes exclusive translations of world classics and contemporary works of literature, covers different aspects of cultural, artistic, social, and political life in all parts of the world.

Vsesvit monthly is the oldest and the most recognized Ukrainian literary journal. It was founded in 1925 by the prominent Ukrainian writers - Vasyl Ellan-Blakytny, Mykola Khvyliovyi and Alexander Dovzhenko. More than 500 novels, 1,000 poems, short stories, and plays as well as hundreds of essays, reviews, interviews with prominent writers from more than a hundred countries were translated from more than 84 different languages and published in Vsesvit during its existence.

== History ==
The importance of translating foreign works of literature into Ukrainian language was well understood already in the 19th century. After the Ems Decree of 1876 banned, among others, translations into "Little Russian dialect", authors from Dnieper Ukraine would publish their translations in Galician press. During that period members of the Pleiada literary group, among them Lesia Ukrainka, created a list of classical and modern literary works that needed to be translated into Ukrainian. The first chance to create a full-scale Ukrainian literary journal dedicated to translations of foreign literature, only emerged after the establishment of the Ukrainian People's Republic, but during its existence the idea was not realized. The first issue of the Vsesvit literary magazine was issued on 15 January 1925. Until 1934 it emerged two times per month as an illustrated journal. The magazine's covers were designed by Anatol Petrytsky, Ivan Padalka and other prominent artists. In 1930 the magazine's annual circulation reached 1,5 million copies. In October 1934 the publication was closed down, and many of its editors and authors became victims of political repressions.

The magazine was revived in 1958 as a publication exclusively dedicated to translations through the efforts of Maksym Rylsky. It appeared monthly and became known for opening world literature to the Ukrainian audience. Texts published in Ukrainian translation by the magazine included One Hundred Years of Solitude by Gabriel Garcia Marquez, The Godfather by Mario Puzo, The Passions of the Mind by Irving Stone, Animal Farm by George Orwell, as well as works by Franz Kafka, James Joyce, Stefan Zweig, Samuel Beckett, William Faulkner, Agatha Christie and Stephen King. In 1963 a series of translations by repressed neoclassicist Mykola Zerov appeared in the magazine with a foreword by Hryhorii Kochur. The magazine had subscribers around the Soviet Union, as some of its translations emerged earlier than Russian ones. During the peak of its popularity Vsesvit had a monthly circulation of more than 60,000 copies.

As a result of the magazine's success, which contradicted Soviet isolation policies, the magazine's chief editor Dmytro Pavlychko was forced to resign. In 1978 the publication was headed by Vitaly Korotich, a former poet from the Sixtiers generation. Under Korotich's management the magazine halved the number of its issues and limited the scope of translated works to lands of the Soviet bloc. After another change of management in 1986 Vsesvit once again started publishing texts on a wide range of topics. One notable work published during that time was Lady Chatterley's Lover by D. H. Lawrence, translated by Solomiia Pavlychko. In 1990 the yearly circulation reached 785,000 copies. However, starting from the 1990s the magazine suffered a crisis, and by 1997 its number of issues fell to a little more than 2,000. Currently the magazine is being published once every four months and also has an electronic version.

== Activities ==
Ars Translationis, a prestigious literary prize to commemorate famous Ukrainian translator Mykola Lukash, was established by the periodical in 1989. It has been conferred regularly on the best literary translators into the Ukrainian language.

Vsesvit has often been the first to introduce the best in global writing in Ukrainian translations. For a number of generations living in the Soviet Union the journal was a kind of opening and served as a regular link to the "outer world", a break through the iron curtain as it were. Vsesvit also gave rise to a school of Ukrainian translators and scholars known in Ukraine and abroad.

== See also ==
- List of magazines in Ukraine
