= Queer themes in Doctor Serafikus =

Themes in 1947 novel by Viktor Petrov

In the novel Doctor Serafikus, queer themes appear, which were generally uncharacteristic of Ukrainian literature at the time. The LGBT+ community lived "in the closet," and as a result such characters were almost never portrayed in literature, save for rare exceptions. V. Domontovych, whose novels came out in the 1920s, stands as a unique figure in Ukrainian queer literature. Solomiia Pavlychko, in The Discourse of Modernism in Ukrainian Literature, writes that "Petrov turned out to be the first (and so far the last) among male writers who, even if in disguised form, raised the question of love between two men in the Ukrainian context."

== Plot link ==
The plot revolves around the relationships of the main character, Komakha, with women, and as it develops the reader is introduced to Irtsia, Tasia and Ver; yet Serafikus's feelings toward women appear to be purely platonic. By nature the doctor is, as is known, withdrawn, deeply inhibited in matters of relationships and sexuality, and feels disgust whenever conversation turns to personal life. He has a pathological fear of women, avoids them and once he finally makes contact, has no idea how to behave. The protagonist's closest friend is Korvyn, an artist who once had a fiancée named Tania Berens. It is through Korvyn, and from his perspective, that the reader learns about the romantic relationship between him and the doctor. What emerges is a love triangle unusual for Ukrainian literature: two men and a woman, except that one of the men is in a state of bisexual infatuation in which Korvyn did not distinguish between the two objects of his affection. He loved his fiancée and Komakha equally, calling Komakha his fiancé as well. He dreamed of introducing Komakha and Tania, but the moment it happened, the romance vanished, along with the secret three-way love that the other two participants had never even suspected.

== The nature of the relationship ==
In conversation with Ver, Korvyn recalls his old "friendship" with the doctor, somewhere between youth and adulthood, which he describes more as "a touching infatuation, tenderness, devotion." It was difficult for him to tell everything to a woman, since, as one might guess, the topic felt forbidden and taboo. The question, in fact, is about the nature of the relationship: was this infatuation, for Serafikus, the same as infatuation with women? Pavlychko, who studied this question, stressed that "what matters is not the physical side, and not even whether or not a connection between two persons of the same sex took place, but the very possibility, the legalization of such a connection." The matter is debatable, however, because of the ambiguity of the vocabulary V. Domontovych uses to describe the relationships between men: "Doctor Serafikus did not call him; Korvyn came to him on his own, took his friendship, overcame the reluctance, resistance, unwillingness, withdrawal and lack of initiative. Wishing to give himself, Korvyn was forced to take." The quoted lines point directly to the sexual nature of the relationship between Korvyn and Komakha, though their bond was more than purely physical. Their "friendship" Korvyn called a shared life and a "spiritual marriage," while friends and acquaintances called the pair husband and wife. They went to parks, theaters, the university, exactly the things Komakha associated with relationships with women. "We get for the first time a relatively happy situation of love between two men described in writing", as Pavlychko concludes.

== The sexual orientation of the characters ==
Komakha comes across as a person who is almost agender and asocial, so certain deviations from the conventional ideal of sexuality are an organic part of his image. Given his history of relationships, it becomes clear that he is an asexual biromantic, capable of falling in love with a person of any gender, but uninterested in sexual relations. "I have no desire to meet anyone, man or woman, it makes no difference, except you," Serafikus tells Ver. Their relationship, as Pavlychko noted, was inorganic and artificial, perhaps because it did not suit his type of sexuality. Komakha's asexuality accounts for his aversion to relationships, and the fact that he fits the description of a biromantic fully accounts for his capacity to love. Korvyn, by contrast, is a bisexual who managed to form relationships with both a man and women.
