= Hryhorii Kochur =

Ukrainian writer, translator and human rights activist (1908–1994)

- Native name: Григорій Кочур
- Born: 17 November 1908 Feskovka, Russian Empire (now Feskivka, Ukraine)
- Died: 15 December 1994 (aged 86) Irpin, Ukraine
- Resting place: Baikove Cemetery
- Occupation: Poet; translator; human rights activist
- Period: c. 1914–1994
- Literary movement: Kyivan Neoclassicism
- Notable awards: Maksym Rylsky Prize (1989); Shevchenko National Prize (1995, posthumous)

Hryhorii Porfyrovch Kochur (Ukrainian: Григо́рій Порфи́рович Ко́чур; 17 November [O.S. 4 November] 1908 – 15 December 1994) was a Ukrainian writer, translator and human rights activist. A polyglot, Kochur was one of the most prolific translators in the history of the modern Ukrainian language, translating over 600 different works of poetry and different works of literature from 25 various countries over six decades. Kochur was an important figure in the Ukrainian cultural revival that took place during the 1960s, and he was arrested and sent to the Gulag by the Soviet government.

== Early life and career ==
Hryhorii Porfyrovych Kochur was born on 17 November 1908 in the village of Feskivka, in what was then the Russian Empire and is now in Ukraine's northern Chernihiv Oblast. His father, who taught him to read at the age of three, was a descendant of Zaporozhian Cossacks; the surname "Kochur" is descended from "koch" (коч), an antiquated term in Ukrainian for a boat. From an early age, Kochur frequently read the works of poet Taras Shevchenko. He additionally learned Old Church Slavonic from the Bible as a child, and had an interest in the Niva magazine.

Kochur's gymnasium education was conducted at the Polish Kalisz gymnasium. The gymnasium was based in the city of Mena (in modern-day Chernihiv Oblast, Ukraine), evacuating from German advances during World War I. In this period, he began to publish his first poems and translations (from Russian) in a local handwritten journal, known as The Local Star. Kochur later claimed that he received no encouragement from his peers, who were not translators, instead translating the works of Semyon Nadson into Ukrainian.

In 1928 Kochur began studying at the philological faculty of the Kyiv Institute of People's Education (now part of Taras Shevchenko National University of Kyiv) in 1928. Kochur was educated in translation by several leading members of the Neoclassicists, a literary movement during the 1920s. Among his teachers were Mykola Zerov, Maksym Rylsky, Pavlo Fylypovch, Yuriy Klen and Mykhailo Drai-Khmara. He was also an assistant to Ahatanhel Krymsky, a leading Ukrainian Orientalist at the time. Kochur's teachers began pushing him to publish his translations from his first year as a student, and invited him to write translations of French literature as part of a 1930 anthology.

From 1932 to 1936 Kochur taught foreign literature at the Tiraspol Pedagogical Institute (now the Shevchenko Transnistria State University). He later taught at Vinnytsia Pedagogical Institute from 1936 to 1941, heading the institute's department of literature. He continued to publish his translations from French in this period, with works being published in 1935 and 1938. At the same time Kochur was becoming increasingly accepted among the Neoclassicists, frequently meeting them at the flat of Stepan Savchenko in Kyiv and collaborating with them on works of poetry. At the time, he bonded with Klen over the writings of Rainer Maria Rilke; Kochur was a fan of Rilke, while Klen, an ethnic German, had translated Rilke's works into Ukrainian. Kochur later stated that this connection helped him to decide on translating as his life's work, saying in 1993, "They helped form me, helped me to become who I am. Their influence is undeniable. Without them, perhaps, it would have been harder for me to achieve this."

== Repression ==
Kochur had first protested against the Soviet state while still studying at the Kyiv Institute of People's Education, condemning the Union for the Freedom of Ukraine trial as a farce. As a result of this, he was deprived of the welfare payments he was entitled to as the son of a peasant. Later, Kochur narrowly avoided being caught up in the Great Purge in 1937. The 1932 anthology of translations that had included Kochur's works was banned by the Soviet government, and several Neoclassicists, Zerov among them, were arrested and executed. During this time, Kochur married Iryna Voronovych, the daughter of an exiled member of the Dumka capella. He worked at several cities throughout Ukraine and modern-day Moldova prior to Operation Barbarossa, including Tiraspol, Vinnytsia, Bălți and Poltava.

During Operation Barbarossa, Kochur's family was evacuated from Vinnytsia to Poltava, but the city was captured before they could flee further east into the Soviet Union. Kochur would continue to live under German occupation in Poltava until 1943, when the city was recaptured by the Soviets. Following the recapture of Poltava, Kochur was put on trial for "Ukrainian bourgeois nationalism" and alleged links to the Organisation of Ukrainian Nationalists. He recounted in 1993 that he had met some men from the western Ukrainian city of Lviv during the occupation, who had given him the works of Bohdan Ihor Antonych. He later discovered during his trial that these individuals had been members of the Organisation of Ukrainian Nationalists.

Kochur was sentenced to ten years of imprisonment in the Gulag, and he was sent to the city of Inta in the Komi Autonomous Soviet Socialist Republic. He worked at the Gulag as a miner, and continued to translate poetry from the Hungarian, Georgian and Latvian, all of which were languages commonly spoken at the Inta Gulag. Many of his translations were burned by guards and later rewritten from memory. He was released in 1953, as part of the Amnesty of 1953 following the death of Joseph Stalin.

Following his release from prison, Kochur returned to Ukraine and settled in the city of Irpin, near Kyiv. Rehabilitated during the Khrushchev Thaw, he soon rebuilt his links with surviving members of the interwar Ukrainian intelligentsia, including Rylsky, Pavlo Tychyna, Mykola Bazhan, Andriy and Oleksandr Biletsky, and Yevhen Drobiazko, among others. Simultaneously, Kochur was also discovered by a younger generation of Ukrainian writers, known as the Sixtiers. Myroslav Marynovych, a Ukrainian Soviet dissident, wrote in 2021 that Kochur was a "key figure in the 1960s Ukrainian cultural revival." Throughout the 1960s Kochur continued to write translations, including from English, German, and Czech. He also translated Quotations from Chairman Mao Tse-tung, having previously translated portions of Flowers in the Mirror during the Hundred Flowers Campaign in China. His translation of William Shakespeare's Hamlet, as well as the writings of Julian Tuwim, were particularly noted as the first translations of the original works into Ukrainian by George S. N. Luckyj.

== Later career ==
Kochur continued to be engaged in both literature and politics into the 1970s. He expressed opposition to Viacheslav Chornovil's 1971 formation of the Civic Committee for the Defence of Nina Strokata, which had been formed along the lines of committees for the legal defence of Angela Davis in the United States. He translated Dante Alighieri's La Vita Nuova in 1965, and wrote several monographs about writers from both Ukraine (such as Rylsky) and other countries of Europe (such as Shakespeare and Aesop) in the late 1960s and early 1970s. He supported Ukrainian dissidents as a witness for Yevhen Sverstiuk's defence during the 1972–1973 Ukrainian purge, as a result of which he was expelled from the Union of Writers of Ukraine. He further supported other dissidents, led by Marynovych, who publicly celebrated Koliada in 1977.

Kochur was admitted back into the Union of Writers in 1988. Following the dissolution of the Soviet Union, he was allowed to travel outside of the former Soviet Union for the first time in his life. He first travelled to Czechoslovakia, where he met Václav Havel, a Czech dissident leader who was a fan of Kochur's work. He later gave a lecture at the University of Illinois, and also visited Poland. He published his final anthology of translations, Second Echo, in 1991.

=== Death ===
Kochur died on 15 December 1994 in Irpin from kidney failure. In the days prior to his death, while he was on his deathbed, he continued to work, discussing Mykola Lukash's translation of Don Quixote and expressing consternation at the fact that he was unable to finish a foreword to a book by Vira Vovk. A year after his death, he was posthumously awarded the Shevchenko National Prize for Second Echo in 1995.
