= Mykhailo Drai-Khmara =

Ukrainian Neoclassiscist poet and Slavicist

- Михайло Драй-Хмара
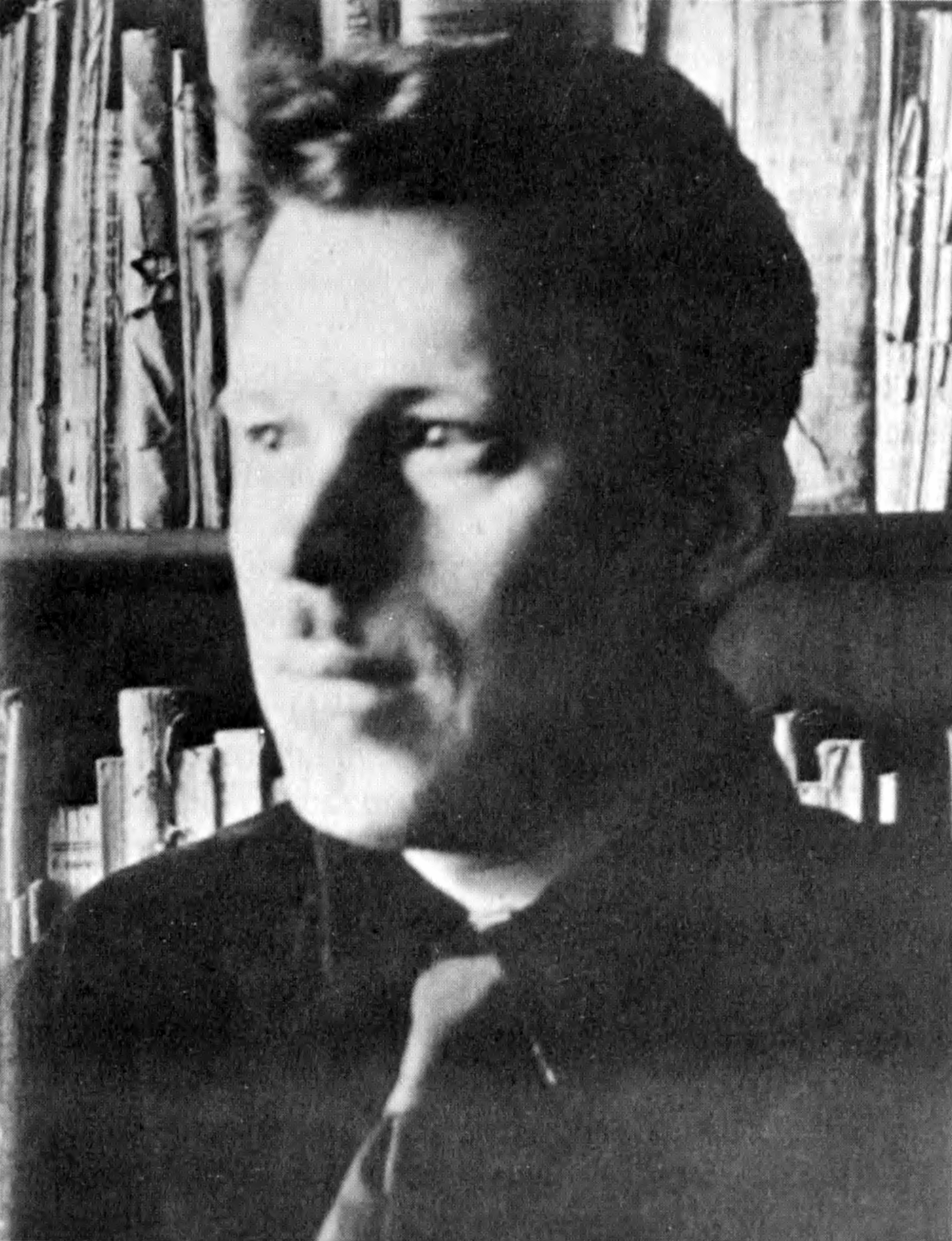
- Drai-Khmara in 1925
- Born: Mykhailo Opanasovych Drai; 10 October 1889; Mali Kanivtsi, Russian Empire (now Ukraine)
- Died: 19 January 1939 (aged 49); Kolyma, Soviet Union (now Russia)
- Education: Kyiv University
- Writing career
- Language: Ukrainian
- Period: 1920–1935
- Literary movement: Kyivan Neoclassicists

Signature
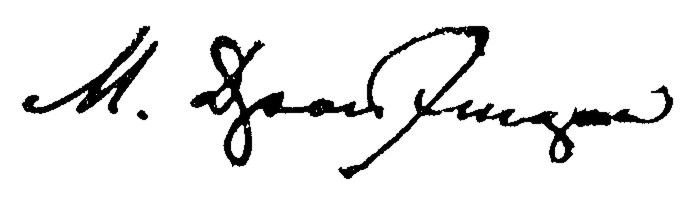

Mykhailo Opanasovych Drai-Khmara (né Drai; Ukrainian: Михайло Опанасович Драй-Хмара; 10 October 1889 – 19 January/April 1939) was a Ukrainian Neoclassicist poet and Slavicist. A polyglot, he was renowned for his literary and scientific work. Drai-Khmara became a victim of Soviet repression as part of the Executed Renaissance generation.

== Biography ==
A native of Cherkasy Oblast, Mykhailo stemmed from a Cossack family and originally bore the surname Drai. He added the second part of his name, "Khmara" (Ukrainian for "cloud") during his studies, as anti-German sentiment was rife at the time, and the surname Drai sounded identical to German word Drei ("three"). His father Panas Drai was a rich peasant from the village of Mali Kanivtsi and worked as a scribe and judicial counsellor. His mother was a descendant of the rich Brahynets Cossack family; she died when Mykhailo was four years old.

Supported by his father, Mykhailo finished a school in Zolotonosha and graduated from a gymnasium in Cherkasy. He then moved to Kyiv enrolling into the private Pavlo Galagan Collegium and later studying at the Historical-Philological Faculty of Kyiv University. After graduating, he started working at the university chair and went abroad to study Slavic languages and archives. As a philologist, Drai-Khmara specialized in Ukrainian and Serbian literatures, as well as histories of Belarusian and Serbian languages.

During the First World War Drai-Khmara enrolled at Saint-Petersburg University as a professoral stipendiate. In Saint-Petersburg he definitely adopted a Ukrainian national identity. Following the Bolshevik Revolution and start of the Ukrainian War of Independence, Drai-Khmara and his wife returned to Kyiv. Soon thereafter he was invited to teach as a professor in Kamianets-Podilskyi at the invitation of Ivan Ohienko. In Kamianets-Podilskyi Drai-Khmara began writing in Ukrainian language, issuing his first poetry collection, which was never published due to lack of paper.

Following the occupation of Ukraine by the Bolsheviks, Drai-Khmara was invited to join his emigre colleagues from the university in Prague, but refused and returned to Kyiv. There he taught at several higher schools and headed the department of Slavic studies at the Institute of Linguistics of the Ukrainian Academy of Sciences. In partnership with Ahatanhel Krymsky, Drai-Khmara conducted research of the Ukrainian scientific language. He also achieved prominence with his studies dedicated to the life and works of Lesia Ukrainka. In 1926 his only published poetry collection was issued in Kyiv.

During the Holodomor in Ukraine, Drai-Khmara housed a 15-year-old orphan whom he met in the streets of Kyiv, saving her life. After the arrest of Maksym Rylsky, he supported the poet's family, and after he had been freed from imprisonment lobbied for him to become his successor at the Institute of Linguistic Education. Drai-Khmara knew 19 languages, including Ancient Greek, Latin and Sanskrit. Among his works was an unfinished translation of Dante's Divine Comedy, which was destroyed among other manuscripts after his arrest.

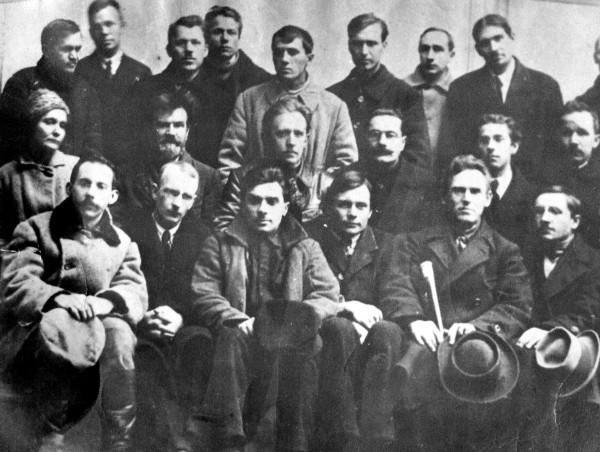
Drai-Khmara (third from left in upper row) with a group of Ukrainian authors in 1923

In Kyiv Drai-Khmara joined a group of Ukrainian Neoclassical authors, which involved Mykola Zerov, Maksym Rylsky, Oswald Burghardt and Pavlo Fylypovych. Drai-Khmara's poetry with its anti-proletarian undertones, irritated Soviet authorities, and in March 1933 he was arrested, but soon released due to lack of evidence. During his arrest the poet refused a proposal to become an NKVD informer. As a result, he lost his position at the university and was forced to do part-time jobs, but still devoted his time to poetry.

In 1935 Drai-Khmara finished his second poetry collection, which couldn't be published due the new arrest, which took place on 5 September of that year. Accused of "counterrevolutionary activity", he refused to provide evidence against a number of fellow Ukrainian poets, many of whom, in their turn, cooperated with NKVD and presented accusations against him. Sentenced to 5 years of labour camps in Kolyma, in May 1938 he was given an additional 10-year term for participating in an anti-Soviet organization and spreading anti-government propaganda.

In camps, Drai-Khmara was forced to work as a miner and carried heavy loads, with parcels sent to him by his family being confiscated. Emaciated prisoners unable to work would be regularly executed. According to a fellow camp inmate, Drai-Khmara died in April 1939, after being shot by a guard while attempting to save the life of another prisoner, a student from Kyiv, who was sentenced to death by prison authorities. An official notification sent to the poet's wife claimed that he died on 19 January 1939 of heart failure. In 1989 Drai-Khmara was posthumously rehabilitated.

== Personal life and family ==
Drai-Khmara enjoyed doing sports, including ice skating, volleyball, croquet, tennis, swimming and hiking. He had a sister Maria, whom he helped to receive higher education, and a daughter Oksana (married name Asher). Following Drai-Khmara's arrest, his wife and daughter were exiled to Bashkiria. Later they were able to emigrate to the United States.

== Works ==
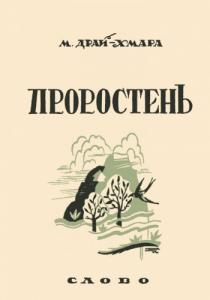
Cover of Drai-Khmara's 1926 collection Sprout (Проростень)

Drai-Khmara's poetry is characterized with symbolist elements, especially visible in his early works. In his later period he became closer in style to mainstream Kyiv classicists. Some of Drai-Khmara's earliest poems were published in 1920 in the Kamianets newspaper Nova Dumka, and during the later part of the 1920s his works saw the light in periodicals Zhyttia i Revolyutsiya and Chervonyi Shliakh. Most of his translations, which included works of French, West Slavic and Belarusian symbolists, were never published.

=== Poetry ===
- Young Spring (Молода весна, 1922) - poetry collection (unpublished)
- Sprout (Проростень, 1926) - poetry collection
- Sun Marches (Сонячні марші, 1935) - unpublished

=== Scientific publications ===
- Lesya Ukrainka. Life and Works (Леся Українка. Життя і творчість, 1926)
- Lesya Ukrainka's Poem "Vila Posestra" on the Background of Serbian and Ukrainian Epos (Поема Л. Українки «Віла Посестра» на тлі серб. та укр. епосу, 1929)
