= Maksym Strikha =

Ukrainian translator and writer (born 1961)

- Макси́м Стрі́ха
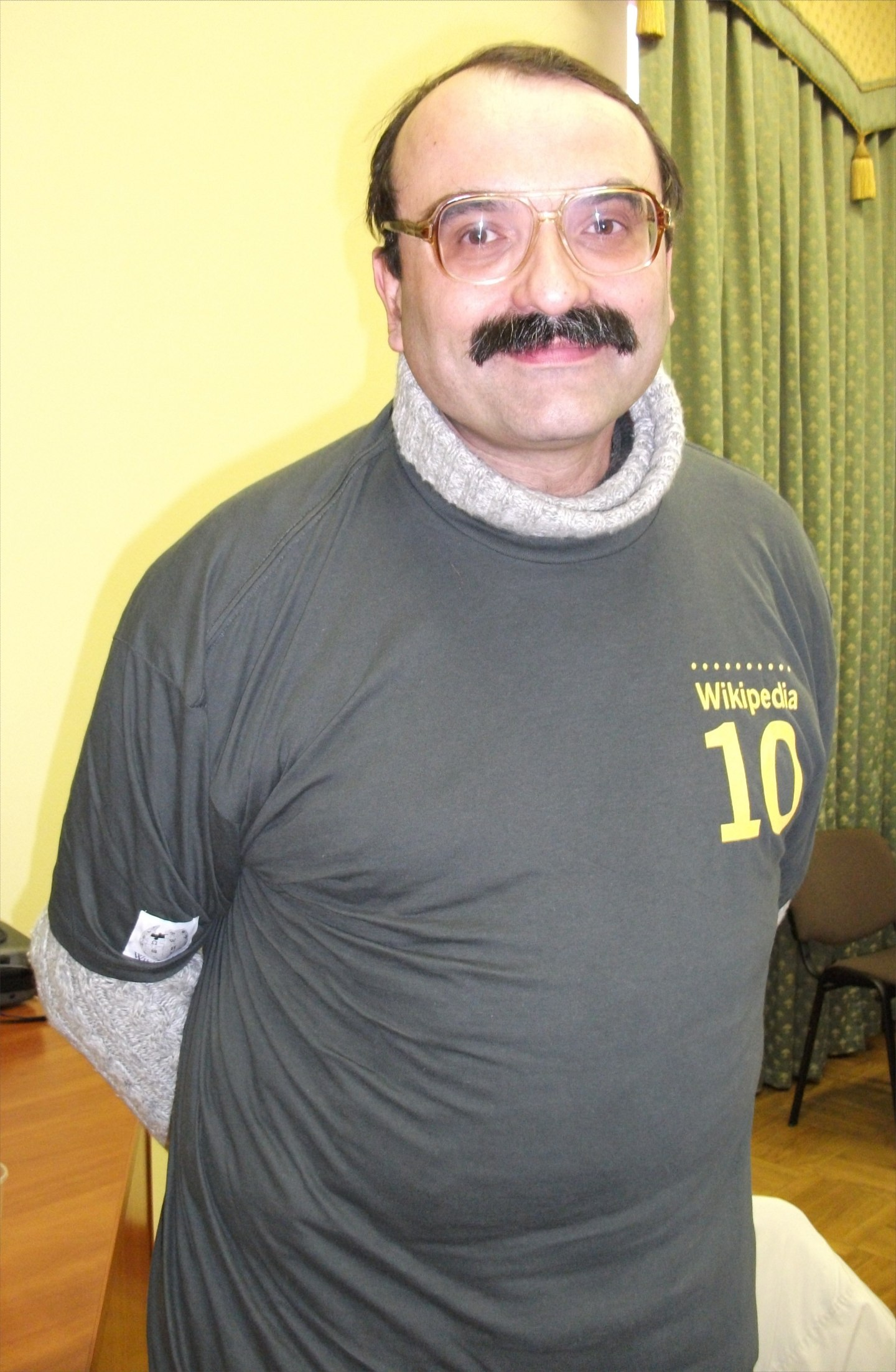
- Strikha in 2011

Deputy Ministry of Education and Science
- In office September 2014 – September 2019
- President: Petro Poroshenko; Volodymyr Zelenskyy
- Prime Minister: Arseniy Yatsenyuk; Volodymyr Groysman; Oleksiy Honcharuk
- Minister: Serhiy Kvit; Liliya Hrynevych; Hanna Novosad
- In office February 2008 – 16 June 2010
- President: Viktor Yushchenko
- Prime Minister: Yulia Tymoshenko
- Minister: Ivan Vakarchuk

Personal details
- Born: Maksym Vitaliyovych Strikha; 24 June 1961 (age 65) Kyiv, Ukrainian SSR, Soviet Union
- Party: NRU (1988–1989); URP (2005–2010)
- Spouse: Natalia Starchenko
- Children: Iaroslava Strikha
- Parents: Vitalii Strikha (father); Gula Maksymivna (mother)
- Education: University of Kyiv; Ioffe Institute (PhD)
- Occupation: Translator; writer
- Awards: Maksym Rylsky Prize

Maksym Vitaliyovych Strikha (Ukrainian: Макси́м Віта́лійович Стрі́ха; born 24 June 1961) is a Ukrainian physicist, writer, translator, publicist, and public figure. He was the Deputy Ministry of Education and Science from 2008 to 2010 and from 2014 to 2019. He was also the president of Ukrainian Physical Society, member of PEN Ukraine and National Writers' Union of Ukraine (NSPU).

== Early life and education ==
Strikha was born on 24 June 1961 in Kyiv into a family of scientists. His parents were Vitalii Strikha and Gula Maksymivna. He received his early education at Secondary School No. 58 in Kyiv. In 1983, he graduated from the Faculty of Radiophysics, Electronics and Computer Systems at the University of Kyiv (KNU). He later pursued postgraduate studies at the Ioffe Institute and completed his doctoral studies at the Lashkarev Institute of Semiconductor Physics of the National Academy of Sciences of Ukraine.

== Career ==
Strikha has been employed at the V. E. Lashkarev Institute of Semiconductor Physics of the National Academy of Sciences of Ukraine since 1983, where he developed a coherent theory of photonic and recombination processes in real semiconductors affected by defects, deformations, and compositional inhomogeneities. Beyond his scientific career, he has been active in the political and public spheres since the late 1980s. He contributed to the founding of the Society of Ukrainian Language and the People's Movement of Ukraine (NRU) in 1988–89. He also served as a member of the original audit committee of the Taras Shevchenko Ukrainian Language Society, elected in 1989, and was a deputy of the first democratic convocation of the Kyiv City Council from 1990 to 1994.

Strikha went on to serve as an advisor to Ivan Dziuba, then Minister of Culture, and in 1994 became a member of the NSPU, later acting as coordinator of its Kyiv branch. From 1995 to 2008, he also headed the laboratory for methodological problems of cultural policy at the Ukrainian Center for Cultural Studies. In 1997, he joined PEN Ukraine and was awarded the degree of Doctor of Physical and Mathematical Sciences on 1 January that year, specialising in the physics of semiconductors and dielectrics. In 1999, he began leading scientific programmes at the Institute of Open Politics.

From 2005 to 2010, Strikha served as deputy head of the Ukrainian Republican Party (URP). On 9 January 2007, he commented on the Russia–Belarus energy dispute, suggesting that the crisis might push Belarus toward closer ties with Ukraine. He proposed that this could revive the idea of the "Mezhmorye Union" as an alternative to Belarus becoming a subordinate region of Russia. In early February 2008, Strikha was appointed deputy minister of education and science of Ukraine. Later that year, he also became a professor at the Department of Physical Electronics at the KNU.

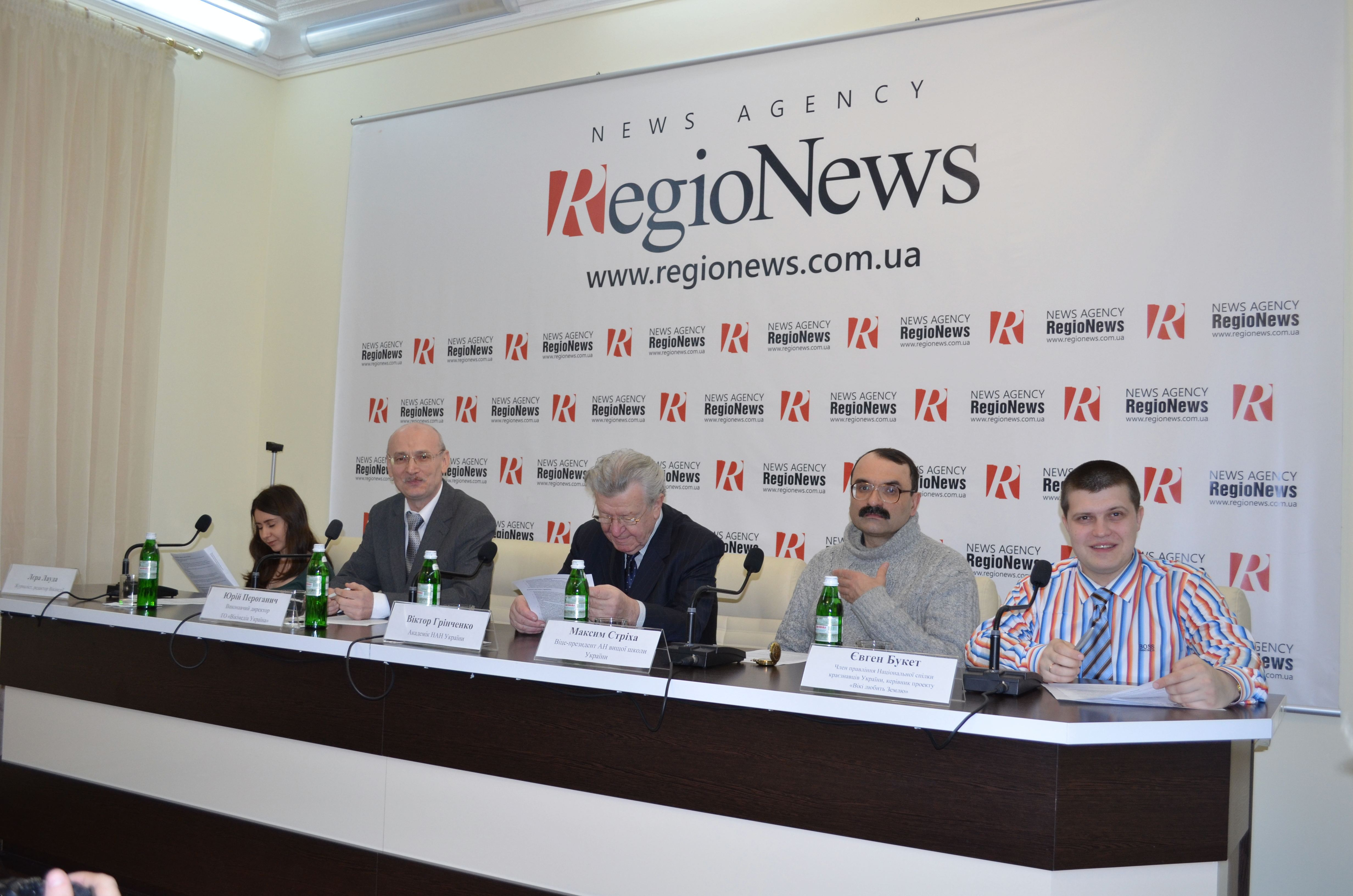
Strikha (seated second from the right) at the conference marking nine years of the Ukrainian Wikipedia in 2017

From 1 January 2010 to 1 January 2014, Strikha served as chief research fellow in the department of theoretical physics. Between 2010 and 2021, he held the position of first vice-president of the Academy of Sciences of Higher Education of Ukraine. Earlier, from 2005 to 2007, he was chief research fellow at the Institute of Encyclopaedic Research of the National Academy of Sciences of Ukraine on a part-time basis, as well as head of the translation department at Borys Grinchenko Kyiv Metropolitan University from 2010 to 2012, later becoming a professor there from 2012 to 2014, also part-time. From 2013 to 2016, he was president of the Ukrainian Physical Society. He led the working group responsible for drafting the Law of Ukraine "On Scientific and Scientific-Technical Activity" in 2015 and, in the same year, became a full member of the Shevchenko Scientific Society. Between 2015 and 2019, he co-chaired the National Commission on Orthography, whose work culminated in the approval of a new edition of the Ukrainian orthography.

Strikha has been actively addressing the challenges faced by scientists and students displaced by the war in Donbas. He noted that while most have found refuge within Ukraine, they are often in temporary positions and unable to continue their research due to limited resources. Strikha emphasised that the Ukrainian government, constrained by financial difficulties, can offer little support. He identified the greatest current need as equipping laboratories and refurbishing university facilities overwhelmed by the influx of displaced researchers. Despite the difficulties in June 2015, Strikha remains cautiously optimistic, saying, "The good news is we're holding on."

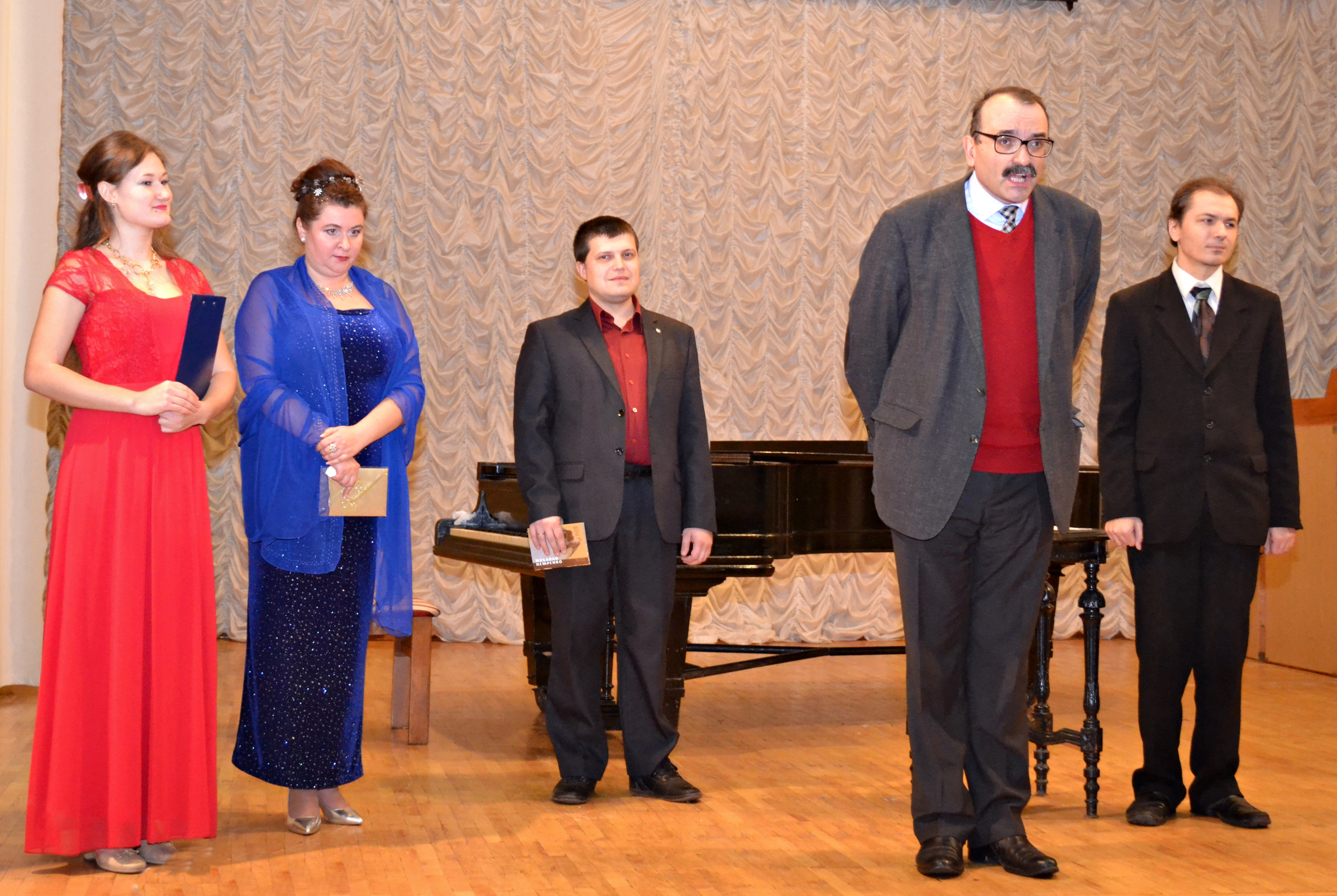
Strikha (standing second from the right) at the World Classic in Ukrainian contest 2017

On 1 January 2018, Strikha was awarded the academic title of professor. Later that year, on 23 August, he announced that new language regulations would be introduced with the aim of restoring Ukrainian spelling to its pre-1919 form, before Soviet-era "Russification" policies took effect. He argued that these changes would enhance the quality of the language and better reflect Ukrainian traditions. The reforms, which sought to reverse Soviet transliteration practices, were to be implemented through schools and media channels. The initiative, part of a broader effort to reinforce Ukrainian linguistic identity, drew criticism from commentators in Moscow. That same year, he joined other prominent figures in signing an appeal for a political boycott of the 2018 FIFA World Cup in Russia, condemning the persecution of Ukrainian political prisoners, including film director Oleh Sentsov, who had launched a hunger strike to demand their release.

In February 2019, Strikha and Ivan Malkovych resigned from PEN Ukraine in protest against a unilateral statement made by its new leadership. The statement supported a student from the National Academy of Visual Arts and Architecture who had mocked a veteran instructor from the Anti-Terrorist Operation (ATO), prompting outrage among some members. Later that year, on 17 October, Strikha had written another open letter to Maksym Tymoshenko, criticising the Ukrainian National Tchaikovsky Academy of Music's decision to ban Ukrainian-language performances in favour of original-language-only productions. On 25 November, Strikha joined a group of prominent Ukrainian scientists, writers, linguists, and cultural figures in sending an open letter to Minister of Culture, Youth and Sports Volodymyr Borodiansky. The letter voiced strong concern over the growing marginalisation of the Ukrainian language in national opera houses and music education.

== Literacy career ==
Strikha has been actively involved in literary translation since the early 1980s. His contributions include two literary monographs, a book of poems titled Sonnets and Octaves (1991), and numerous essays on literature and literary criticism. He developed and advocated for the concept of the nation-building role of translating Ukrainian literature within the field of translation studies.

Strikha’s translation of Geoffrey Chaucer's The Canterbury Tales into Ukrainian earned him the prestigious Hryhorii Kochur Award. This recognition highlighted the depth and quality of his work, which successfully captured the nuances, humour, and historical context of Chaucer's original. Strikha, who studied under Hryhorii Kochur and maintained a close relationship with him during the final decade of Kochur's life, frequently expressed his gratitude for the profound influence his mentor had on him. He has often praised Kochur, along with other prominent Ukrainian translators, for their vital role in shaping national identity through literature and preserving their intellectual legacy. Previously, Strikha was awarded the Maksym Rylsky Prize for his translation of Dante Alighieri's Divine Comedy and is the author of the monograph Ukrainian Translation and Translators: Between Literature and Nation-Building.

In addition to these works, Strikha has translated notable pieces such as Martin's Lie, the libretto of Gian Carlo Menotti's opera (2018), Francesca da Rimini, the libretto of Sergei Rachmaninoff's opera (2019), and Sophronia on the Fire (from Jerusalem Delivered), which became the basis for the libretto of Oksana Yevsyukova's opera (2023).

== Personal life ==
Strikha is married to Natalia Starchenko, a senior researcher at the Institute of History of Ukraine. They have a daughter, Iaroslava Strikha, who is a translator, literary critic, and a Doctor of Philosophy at Harvard University. He is multilingual, speaking English, Italian, Polish, Russian, and French.

== Awards ==
He has been bestowed upon the following awards and honours:

- Lauro Dantesco (2013)
- Maksym Rylsky Prize (2015)
- Officer of the Order of Academic Palms (2019)
- Hryhorii Kochur Award (2021)
- Order of Merit of the Italian Republic (2023)
- S.I. Pekar Prize (2024)
