= Mykola Lukash =

Ukrainian literary translator, theorist, and lexicographer

- Микола Олексійович Лукаш
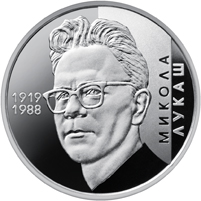
- Lukash on a 2019 Ukrainian commemorative coin
- Born: December 19, 1919; Krolevets, Chernigov Governorate, Russian Empire (now Ukraine)
- Died: 29 August 1988 (aged 68); Kyiv, Ukrainian SSR, Soviet Union (now Ukraine)
- Burial place: Baikove Cemetery
- Education: Kyiv University (1937-1939); H.S. Skovoroda Kharkiv National Pedagogical University (1945-1947)
- Occupations: Translator; Literary theorist Lexicographer
- Awards: Maksym Rylsky Prize (1988)

Mykola Oleksiyovych Lukash (Ukrainian: Микола Олексійович Лукаш; 19 December 1919 – 29 August 1988) was a well-known Ukrainian literary translator, theorist, and lexicographer who was born in Krolevets and died in Kyiv. He knew more than 20 languages. Many literary works were successfully translated from the majority of these languages and introduced to the Ukrainian literature by him.

A literary prize, Ars Translationis, was instituted by Vsesvit in 1989 to commemorate Lukash.

== Early life and education ==
Lukash was born on 19 December 1919 in the city of Krolevets, which was then part of the Chernigov Governorate in the Russian Empire. He was the son of Oleksiy Yakovych Lukash and Vasylyna Ivaniva (née Onykiienko). His father, Oleksiy, was a weaver from a line of shliakhta who had long lived in Left-bank Polissya, which was famous for its embroidered towels. Vasylyna, too, came from a family with noble roots. However, shortly after Mykola's birth, the family descended into poverty following Dekulakization (which targeted the so-called "kulaks") and the Lukash family was evicted from the area. Nevertheless, the family survived collectivization and the Holodomor and Lukash finished his secondary schooling. As a child, he was quick to learn the local languages, including Yiddish, the Romani language, French, German, and English. According to later biographies, he learned the additional languages after reading every book in the library of Krolevets that was available in Ukrainian, Russian, and Polish. He stated specifically to a Jewish friend that he learned Yiddish from looking at both the German and Yiddish versions of an entry in the Literary Encyclopedia. In the ninth grade during 1935 Lukash took part in the publication of the school's "Literary Newspaper" as a designer and also in the following year "LIASMO" - "Literary Association of the Young".

During this time, he continued to work on his first translation: that of Goethe's Faust (however, the work would later be lost following World War II). At the start of the war, he was not conscripted into the army due to his poor eyesight and having a damaged leg, but was still required to work on defensive structures in the area west of Kyiv. After the university was evacuated to Kharkiv, he attempted to follow through Krolevets on foot but was caught in the battle there, and he was severely injured and bedridden by fallen shrapnel following a German air raid. In occupied Krolevets, he was allowed to work as a translator for the Krolevets agricultural command center on the recommendation of his former schoolteachers. There is a rumor that during this time, he told the agricultural commandant, Brehm, to convert the district's farms into bases for Taraxacum kok-saghyz, which requires a large amount of additional labour to prevent peasants from being sent into slavery in Germany. In addition, according to his childhood friend, Vasyl Sukhomlyn, he was a contact liaison for units of the Ukrainian Insurgent Army (UPA) to organize escape routes out of Krolevets and helped the underground group in nearby Altynivka (Sumy Oblast). After the Germans fled Krolevets in September 1943, he reported to the draft and was mobilized in an airfield service battalion in Kharkiv, serving as a rifleman then as a clerk after his leg was crippled again when a group of soldiers attempted to cross the Dnipro. Following demobilization in November 1945, he decided not to return to Kyiv due to his temporary work as a translator under occupation, and went back to Kharkiv to the Faculty of French Philology at the H.S. Skovoroda Kharkiv National Pedagogical University to graduate there.

== Years in Kharkiv ==
In 1947 after graduating from the Institute of Foreign Languages in Kharkiv, Lukash worked as a teacher of foreign languages at his alma mater. He then worked as a translator at the Ukrainian Research Institute of Forestry for a year, as a teacher of English and German at the Kharkiv Agricultural Institute for two years, and finally as a teacher of French and German at Kharkiv State University. He did such brief tenures because of having been marked for living in the occupied territory during WWII, so he could not get a permanent staff position, and also because he did not hold a higher scientific degree. In an attempt to meet the requirements for a higher degree, during his off-time, he wrote a dissertation on the historical grammar of the French language, but he burned the prepared research after it was met with resistance from the departments he worked at - most likely because of Lukash's past, rather than the work. He also tried to become a university lecturer of Ukrainian studies around 1952 at the I. Fedorov Ukrainian Polygraphic Institute in Lviv, but this too did not pan out.

While working as a teacher, he completed the only complete translation in Ukrainian of the entire work of Faust in 1955, after starting from scratch following the war and the destruction of his original manuscript. He was celebrated for managing to recreate the hymns of the tragedy and the drunken banter throughout. He also used euphemisms for Gretchen and kept the original rhythm and rhyme scheme of the text. However, he was criticized by the Soviet press for his frequent use of archaisms and dialects. Notably, he was criticized by fellow Ukrainian translator Leonid Pervomayskiy, who remarked that the shadow of the travesty Eneida stood behind Lukash, thus implying the language was too peasant-like and folksy. Victor Koptilov also said Lukash should have listened to his editors.

== Move to Kyiv ==
He then became head of the Department of Poetry for Vsesvit. Lukash had linguistic talents, and a wide knowledge of foreign literature. He is considered to have been one of the most outstanding Ukrainian translators, translating literary works from 20 languages.

He was most prolific during the relatively favourable twenty-year period between 1953 and 1973, when he translated Goethe’s Faust, Flaubert’s Madame Bovary, the poetry of Schiller, Boccaccio’s Decameron and many other works. He was a member of the Union of Writers of Ukraine from 1956 and played an active role in Ukrainian literary life.

Lukash always gave moral support to writers who were being oppressed. Following the arrest of Ivan Dziuba, which was caused by the publication of his work Internationalism or Russification? in London, Lukash sent a letter to the Head of the Presidium of the Verkhovna Rada of the Ukrainian SSR, the Head of the Ukrainian Supreme Court and the General Prosecutor of the Ukrainian SSR with a copy to the Presidium of the Administration of the Union of Writers of Ukraine, in which he disagreed with the court ruling, calling it unjust, and protested against the expulsion of Ivan Dziuba from the Union. Lukash went as far as suggesting that he serve the sentence instead of Dziuba, who, unlike him, was an ill man and had a family to support.

This act cost Lukash dear. He was dismissed from the editorial board of Vsesvit and told that he would be forcibly treated in a special psychiatric hospital. Fortunately these threats were not carried out. On 12 June 1973 the Presidium of the Administration of the Union of Writers of Ukraine voted unanimously to expel Lukash from the Union.

For many years he was effectively under house arrest. He was persecuted in all possible ways and his works stopped being published, depriving him of means of existence. For a long time there was a police officer permanently stationed at the entry to his block who didn’t allow anyone to visit him.

Lukash was reinstated in the Union of Writers of Ukraine on the wave of Perestroika in 1987, when he was almost a dying man. In 1988 he became Laureate of the Maksym Rylsky Literary Prize. Within a few months, on 29 August 1988, Mykola Lukash died.

== Legacy ==
He did not live to see the publication of a large volume of his translations which came out under the title “From Boccaccio to Apollinaire” in 1990, and became a kind of monument to Lukash. The compiler of the volume, translator, and translation theorist Mykhailo Moskalenko said that “in Mykola Lukash Ukraine was sent a Mozartian genius in the truest and most exact meaning of the word”. His colleague, prominent Ukrainian translator Hryhoriy Kochur, described him by saying that “people like Lukash are probably born once in several centuries”.
