= Peredrij Ganna Romanivna =

Ukrainian writer, linguist, and educator (1925–2019)

- Born: 25 January 1925; Chudniv Raion
- Died: 16 September 2019 (aged 94)

Professor Peredrij Ganna Romanivna (25 January 1925 – 16 September 2019) was a Ukrainian writer, linguist and educator. She wrote more than 100 works, including school textbooks. She became professor Emeritus of Cherkasy National University, which was from the Cherkasy Pedagogical Institute (which she had led).

== Life ==
Romanivna was born in 1925 in Zhytomyr Oblast in northern Ukraine. She attended Taras Shevchenko National University of Kyiv and studied in the Faculty of Philology.

She taught Ukrainian language and literature at Berdichev Pedagogical School. The school existed until 1971. She was in the Department of Ukrainian Language within I. I. Mechnykov National University. She worked for more than 37 years advancing to be an Associate Professor and to lead the Department of the Cherkasy Pedagogical Institute.

Her department worked with the Research Institute of Pedagogy of the Academy of Pedagogical Sciences of Ukraine. In 1984 she began co-authoring Ukrainian language textbooks for grades 5, 6, 7. She was recognised for her work with awards from both the central authorities and more locally from the Cherkasy Pedagogical Institute. She became professor emeritus of the Bohdan Khmelnytsky National University of Cherkasy, she was received the award for "Excellent National Education" and the medal of AS Makarenko.

She died in 2019. Her husband was the zoologist Samarsky Sergey Levkovich and their son was the diplomat Samarsky Alexander Sergeevich.
