= Oleksandr Mokrovolskyi =

Ukrainian journalist and translator (1946–2023)

- Олекса́ндр Мокрово́льський
- Born: Oleksandr Mykolayovych Mokrovolskyi; 2 January 1946; Chernyshi, Ukrainian SSR, Soviet Union
- Died: 22 December 2023 (aged 77); Irpin, Kyiv Oblast, Ukraine
- Other name: Kor Abel
- Education: Cherkasy Pedagogical Institute
- Occupations: Journalist; translator; writer
- Awards: Maksym Rylsky Prize

Oleksandr Mykolayovych Mokrovolskyi (Ukrainian: Олекса́ндр Микола́йович Мокрово́льський; 2 January 1946 – 22 December 2023) was a Ukrainian journalist, translator, and writer. He became a member of the National Writers' Union of Ukraine (NSPU) in 1981. His expertise lay in poetry and the translation of both poetry and prose from several European languages into Ukrainian.

== Early life and education ==
Mokrovolskyi was born in the village of Chernyshi on 2 January 1946. From 1964 to 1968, he studied at the Faculty of English at the Cherkasy Pedagogical Institute, now known as Cherkasy National University.

== Career ==
From June 1968 to March 1971, Mokrovolskyi worked as an engineer-translator at the Cherkasy chemical plant. He then joined the Kyiv publishing houses Veselka and Dnipro, where he served as editor and senior editor from September 1971 to June 1982, and remained active in the publishing field until 1984. Despite being recognised as one of the final representatives of the "classical" Ukrainian translation school—led by Dmytro Pavlychko and rooted in the Vsesvitforeign literature journal in the 1970s—Mokrovolskyi was never employed by Vsesvit due to opposition from the KGB of the Ukrainian SSR, who deemed him "unreliable". From December 1984 to December 1992, he was engaged in creative work, and beginning in January 1993, he became editor of the Western European periodicals department at the newspaper Ukraina. Yevropa. Svit.

== Literary career ==
Novels Kolo idei (2016) and the sonnet Sonet proty impeReFii (2023), he authored several poetry collections, including Hlybokyi let (1983), Yavir i palma (1986), and Etnos soten yasnot (2012), the latter written under the pen name Kor Abel. His writing was distinguished by a reflective calm and an immersion in the spirit of language and the power of words.

Mokrovolskyi translated numerous books from English into Ukrainian, covering a wide range of literary works. These include poems such as John J. Plenty and Fiddler Dan by John Ciardi (1973) and The Butterfly's Ball, and the Grasshopper's Feast by William Roscoe (1988, 1990); collections like Book of Nonsense by Edward Lear (1980, 1989, 2017), poems by Percy Bysshe Shelley (1987), and selected works by W. B. Yeats (1990, 2004, co-translator). He also translated works by Charles Dickens, including Christmas Stories (2006) and A Christmas Tree (2010), as well as Sing-song by Christina Rossetti, selected works by Seamus Heaney (both 2008), and Mother Goose (2010). Among his notable contributions are The Hobbit (1985) (Note: In 1985, the publishing house Veselka released Mokrovolskyi's adaptation of The Hobbit, or Journey to the Misty Mountains for children—the first Ukrainian translation of a work by Tolkien. Mokrovolskyi was the first to introduce the word "hobbit" (spelled with a "g" in Ukrainian) into the language, a bold move that challenged the norms of the Soviet literary system. Although modern purists have criticised the translation for taking liberties and not preserving certain names, at the time it had a profound impact.) and a retelling of The Lord of the Rings (2002) by J. R. R. Tolkien. He translated English nursery rhymes under the title Charlie-Warlie (2001) and novels such as The Auctioneer by Joan Samson (1986), The Woman in White by Wilkie Collins (1989), and Ulysses by James Joyce (2015, co-translator). His work also includes stories like Dangerous Journeys by Richard Adams (1990), Artemis Fowl (2005), and The Arctic Incident (2006) by Eoin Colfer, as well as E. B. White's beloved children's books Charlotte's Web (2006), Stuart Little (2012), and The Trumpet of the Swan (2017). Additionally, he translated several instalments of The Sisters Grimm by Michael Buckley (2008, 2009, 2010).

From Spanish, Mokrovolskyi translated the novella In Search of the Black Seagull by D. Alonso (1976) and the novel Dazzling Blue Sky by Alfonso Grosso (1979). His translations from German include the novels A Wasted Semester by Jurij Brezan (1979) and Beringer and the Ancient Wrath by G. Fuchs (1980), the poem Mazepa by Bertolt Brecht (1997), and the novella They Call Me Anteater by C. Nöstlinger (2006). He also translated a range of influential scholarly works, such as Homo Ludens by Johan Huizinga (1993), The Constitution of the USA by David P. Currie (1993), The Idea of History by R. G. Collingwood (1995), and Truth and Method by Hans-Georg Gadamer (2000). His contributions include Pure Theory of Law (2004) and The Essence and Value of Democracy (2013) by Hans Kelsen, The Hero with a Thousand Faces by Joseph Campbell (1999), A History of the Jews by Paul Johnson (2000), The Metastases of Enjoyment by Slavoj Žižek (2000), Public Man, Private Woman by Jean Bethke Elshtain (2002), and Reflections on a Ravaged Century by Robert Conquest (2003). He also translated Political Liberalism (2000) and A Theory of Justice (2001) by John Rawls, as well as Legendary Ireland by Eithne Massey (2006).

Mokrovolskyi also deciphered and translated the book Shchek – Kyiu (2015; literary translation, 2017), along with selected works by a wide range of prominent authors, including William Shakespeare, Lord Byron, Bernard Shaw, Lewis Carroll, Edgar Allan Poe, Robert Louis Stevenson, Jean Wright, D. H. Lawrence, Johann Wolfgang von Goethe, Victor Hugo, Pierre-Jean de Béranger, Philippe Jaccottet, Tristan Tzara, Léopold Sédar Senghor, Torquato Tasso, Salvatore Quasimodo, Justinas Marcinkevičius, Eduardas Mieželaitis, Algimantas Baltakis, and others. Mokrovolskyi also contributed to several anthologies of world poetry intended for middle and senior school pupils, such as Spivets (1972), Svitanok (1978), Peredchuttia (1979), Poklyk (1984), and Zahrava (1989), as well as the German youth poetry collection Green Harz (1985). In his later years from 2002 to 2013, he has instructed students at the National University of Kyiv-Mohyla Academy in a professional translation course. (Note: As a translator, he was fluent in German, French, Italian, Spanish, and English.)

In November 2020, Mokrovolskyi had an exhibition at the Irpin Local History Museum called Coffee Odyssey from Mokrovolskyi. Photographs of images created in coffee grounds—a type of art known as coffee art—were on display. On the 130th anniversary of Tolkien's birth, celebrated on 11 January 2022, Mokrovolskyi participated in a conversation titled "John R.R. Tolkien in Ukrainian" organized by the Astrolabe publishing house and the Museum of Literature. Mokrovolskyi, who was the first to translate The Hobbit into Ukrainian, offered attendees a unique opportunity to obtain his autograph during the event.

== Death ==
News of Mokrovolskyi's death was reported on 22 December 2023 by his colleague, Oleksandr Bozhko, secretary of the NSPU. According to Bozhko, Mokrovolskyi was found dead that day in his room at the House of Writers' Creativity in Irpin, near Kyiv, where he had been living alone in recent years—particularly during the period of Russian occupation. Difficulties arose regarding his burial, as the NSPU did not have contact details for his daughter, who was then abroad.

== Personal life ==
Mokrovolskyi lived and worked in Kyiv and, since 2016, had resided at the House of Writers' Creativity in Irpin, not as a visitor, but due to personal circumstances. He noted that the on-site canteen was overpriced, leading most residents to avoid it, while he paid ₴1,450 a month for lodging, excluding meals. Although some maintenance work, such as trimming bushes, had been carried out, Mokrovolskyi observed that most of the cleaning and landscaping efforts were focused on the part of the property managed by the NSPU, not the area designated for a future public park. He expressed concern that once the writers' homes were renovated, the cost of lodging would rise, making it unaffordable.

== Awards ==
- Maksym Rylsky Prize (1999)
