= Neoclassicists (Ukraine) =

Ukrainian literary group during the 1920s, part of the Executed Renaissance

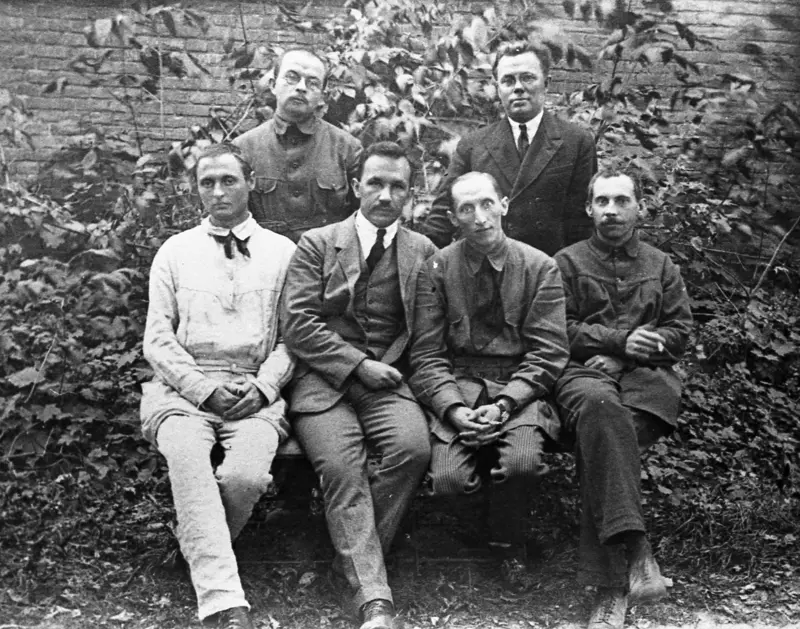
- The Neoclassicists in Baryshivka, late 1920s. From left to right, sitting: Yuriy Klen, Pavlo Fylypovych, Feliks Yakubovskyi, Maksym Rylsky. Standing: Viktor Petrov and Mykola Zerov.
- Years active: 1917–1935
- Location: Kyiv
- Major figures: Mykola Zerov, Maksym Rylsky, Pavlo Fylypovych, Mykhailo Drai-Khmara, Yuriy Klen
- Influences: Aestheticism, modernism

The Neoclassicists (Ukrainian: Неокласики, romanized: Neoklasyky or Неоклясики, romanized: neokliasyky), also referred to as the Academists, was a literary group based in Kyiv, Ukraine during the 1920s. Centred around the piatirne grono (lit. 'cluster of five') of Mykola Zerov, Maksym Rylsky, Pavlo Fylypovych, Mykhailo Drai-Khmara and Yuriy Klen, they were an informal group, so named by opponents during the 1925–1928 Literary Discussion debate for their evocation of themes and imagery associated with classical antiquity. The Neoclassicists opposed the "mass art" and proletarian literature that emerged following the Russian Revolution, favouring literary aesthetics over socialist ideology. The Neoclassicists ceased to exist during the early 1930s, when their members were largely either arrested or fled the Soviet Union. They were part of the Executed Renaissance.

== History and views ==
Following the Russian Revolution, the Ukrainian Academy of Sciences was established by the government of the newly-independent Ukrainian People's Republic in 1918. A group of poets and literary critics closely associated themselves with the academy, the most significant among them being Mykola Zerov, Maksym Rylsky, Pavlo Fylypovych, Mykhailo Drai-Khmara and Oswald Burghardt (writing under the pseudonym of Yuriy Klen). This early association with the Academy of Sciences gave rise to another name for the group, the Academists. From 1920 to 1923, the Neoclassicists increasingly isolated themselves in the village of Baryshivka, near Kyiv, remaining there until the joint debut of Zerov, Rylsky and Fylypovych on 29 June 1923. This, along with Viktor Petrov's report on neoclassicism in poetry to the Ukrainian Academy of Sciences the next day, led to the group's return to Kyiv and the height of their literary criticism, translation and poetry, lasting until early 1929.

The Neoclassicists idealised Parnassianism and sought to emulate it, bringing Ukrainian literature to an aesthetic level of abstract high culture in Ukrainian society. They were not the first such Ukrainian writers to emulate Parnassianism; Lesya Ukrainka had previously advocated for a Ukrainian form of Parnassianism in 1893.

The Neoclassicists were the smallest of three Ukrainian modernist groups opposed to proletarian literature following the Revolution, along with the Symbolists and Futurists. Unlike the Symbolists and Futurists, the Neoclassicists deliberately sought to continue as a small group, refraining from publishing a journal. Zerov, the leader of the group, strongly opposed the politically-charged, revolutionary rhetoric of proletarian literature, saying, "Our poets learn very little, and do not try to improve their command over words. They seize on vers libre like savages on glass jewelry [...] cutting off the roots of any further growth of a poetic style." The Neoclassicists also rejected collectivism, with Zerov believing that it was necessary to treat literature as a subjective field, saying that literary groups could not "have the sole criteria of truth".

The Neoclassicists viewed Ukrainian culture as a natural part of Western European culture and opposed Romantic and folkloric themes. They saw the three necessities of a writer as being knowledge of Ukrainian literature, knowledge of world literature and poetic skill. Much of the Neoclassicists' literature was set in Kyiv, depicting it as an urban, metropolitan location and using its themes. The works of Neoclassicist writer Viktor Petrov depicted the conflict between Neoclassicism and avant-garde literature and the former's self-image, showing Neoclassicism as rationalist, based on European literary traditions and sceptical of revolution, in contrast to their perception of the avant-garde as deeply concerned with social and religious change through revolution, rejection of literary history and interest in sexuality. Petrov noted, however, that there was general repudiation of pre-World War I Ukrainian modernism and populism by both the Neoclassicists and the avant-garde.

The Neoclassicists were given their most commonly-used name during the 1925–1928 Literary Discussion, a series of debates over the nature of Ukrainian literature under the Soviet Union and the broader cultural relationship between Ukraine and Russia. Following the Union for the Freedom of Ukraine trial, the Neoclassicists increasingly found themselves repressed by an increasingly-authoritarian Soviet government. Between 1930 and 1935, most of the group was arrested and imprisoned within the Gulag system, where they later died. Other Neoclassicists, like Burghardt, fled into exile, where they continued their work as part of the Ukrainian diaspora. They were later partially rehabilitated in the 1960s, followed by a movement to full rehabilitation in the 1980s.
