= Maksym Rylsky Museum =

Literary museum in Kyiv

Maxym Rylsky Museum
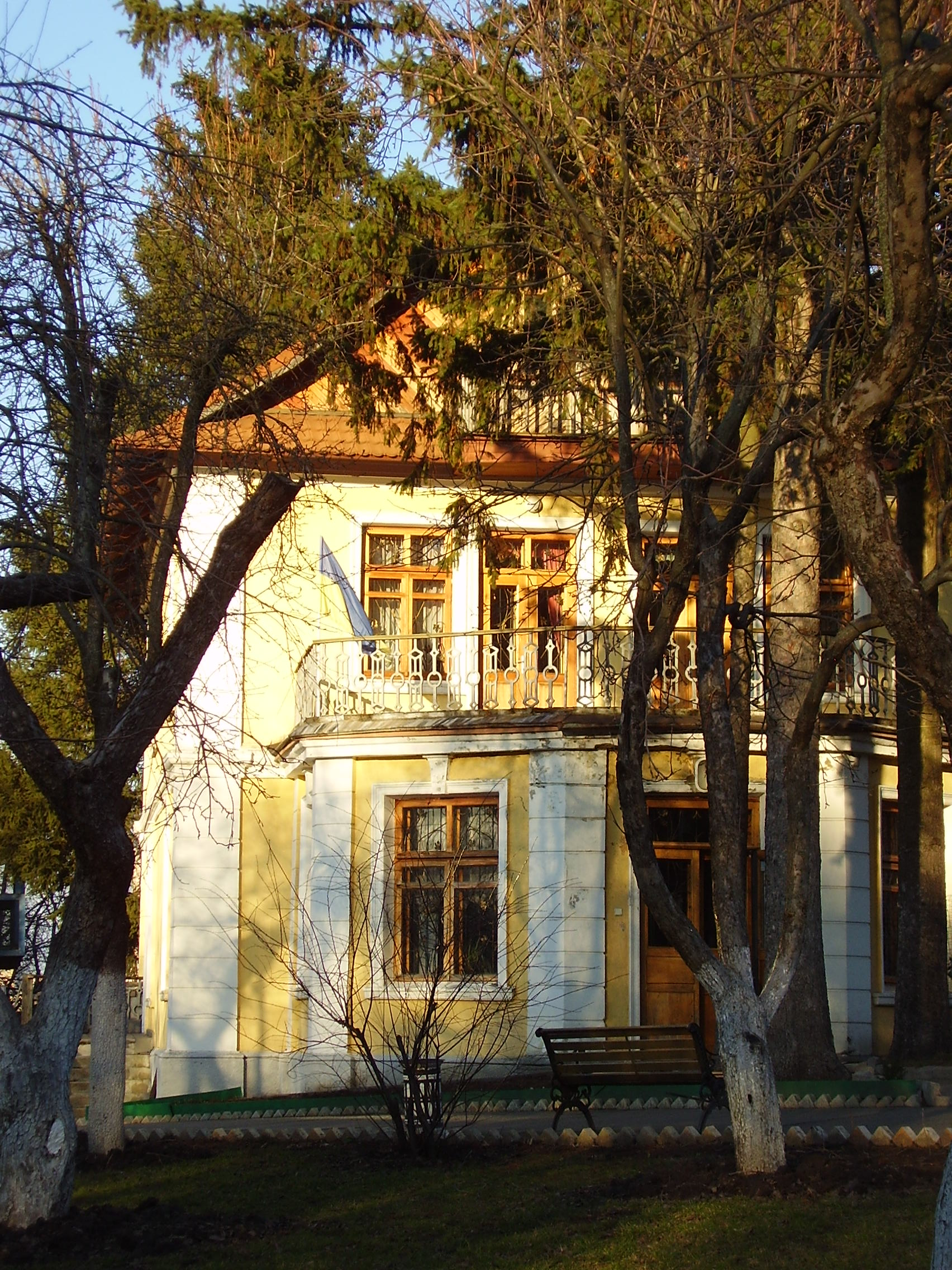
- Location: 7 Maxym Rylsky St, Kyiv, Ukraine
- Coordinates: 50°23′45″N 30°30′50″E

The Maksym Rylsky Museum (officially known as Kyiv Literary and Memorial Museum of Maksym Rylsky, Ukrainian: Київський літературно-меморіальний музей Максима Рильського) is one of the museums in Kyiv, Ukraine, dedicated to Ukrainian poet Maksym Rylsky.

It was founded on 4 May 1966 and opened to visitors two years later.

The museum is located in the house where the poet lived for the last 13 years of his life.

The exposition includes a collection of Rylsky's manuscripts, a memorial library of nearly 10,000 volumes, personal belongings, and art samples from 1940-1960s.

The museum underwent three reexpositions in 1968, 1985, and 2006.

== The exhibition ==
The Kyiv Literary-Memorial Museum of Maksym Rylsky houses items from the poet's lifetime, many manuscripts, and his personal library, including books signed by authors. Operating within Rylsky's former home, the museum combines memorial and biographical elements. The exhibition is displayed across eight museum halls.
