= Maksym Rylsky Prize =

Literary award

Maksym Rylsky prize
- Native name: Премія імені Максима Рильського
- Country: Ukraine
- Rewards: 20,000 Ukrainian hryvnia (per nomination, since 2019)
- Established: 1972 (as part of Ukrainian SSR)

Maksym Rylsky prize is given annually recognizing outstanding literary works of translation into Ukrainian language and translation of classical or contemporary literary works from Ukrainian to other languages. Named after Maksym Rylsky, Ukrainian poet and translator.

== History ==
Established in 1972 by the Council of Ministers of the Ukrainian SSR, the monetary equivalent of which was 1,000 Soviet rubles. After the USSR split, the award was administered by National Writers' Union of Ukraine. It was reintroduced in 2013 by the State Committee for Television and Radio-broadcasting and was awarded to one nominee. Since 2019 the prize is awarded in two nominations, each with 20 000 hryvnas award.

== Winners ==
1973: Mykola Tereshchenko for translations of French poetry

1974: Dimitr Metodiev for translation of Kobzar into Bulgarian

1975: Stepan Kovganyuk for translation of the works by Russian Soviet writer Mikhail Sholokhov and works on the theory and practice of translation

1976: Dmytro Bilous for translation of Bulgarian poetry

1977: Vasyl Mysyk for translation of world's poetry classics

1978: Evgeny Drobyazko for translation of Divine Comedy by Dante Alighieri

1979: Borys Ten for translation of Odyssey and Iliad by Homer

1980: Diodor Bobir for translations novel My Dagestan by Rasul Gamzatov and poetry collection

1981: Maya Kashel for translations from Vietnamese

1982: Maria Komissarova for translations into Russian of the works of Taras Shevchenko, Lesya Ukrainka and some Ukrainian Soviet poets

1983: Yuriy Shkrobinets for translations from Hungarian works by Sándor Petőfi, János Arany, Endre Ady, anthologies of Hungarian classical and modern poetry

1984:

- Abbas Abdulla for the translations into Azerbaijani works of Ukrainian writers
- Abram Katsnelson for the translations into Ukrainian collection of translations Jewish Soviet Poetry

1985: Dmytro Pavlychko for translations of José Martí, Hristo Botev, Nikola Vaptsarov and the anthology World Sonnet

1986: Andrii Sodomora for translations of Horace, Ovid, Catullus poetry

1987: Raul Chilachava for translations into Georgian works by Taras Shevchenko, Hryhoriy Skovoroda, Lesya Ukrainka, Pavlo Tychyna, Maksym Rylskyi, Volodymyr Sosiura and contemporary Ukrainian poets

1988: Mykola Lukash for translations into Ukrainian of Faust, Decameron, Imre Madách's Human Tragedies, works of Lope de Vega, Guillaume Apollinaire, Lorka, Friedrich Schiller, Robert Burns and other

1989: Hryhoriy Kochur for translations of classics of European poetry

1990: Dmytro Palamarchuk for translations of classics of European literature

1991: Yuriy Lisnyak for the interpretation into Ukrainian Heinrich Mann's novels Die Jugend des Königs Henri Quatre, Herman Melville's Moby Dick, Honoré de Balzac's La Peau de chagrin

1992: Yevhen Popovych for translations from the German

1993:

- Vil Hrymych for the interpretations of the works by Slavic languages writers
- Rostyslav Dotsenko for the translation of Margaret Mitchell's novels Gone with the Wind and Charles Dickens's Great Expectations
- Yosyp Kobiv for translations of Plutarch and Plato works

1994:

- Igor Kaczurowskyj for numerous translations of poetry from Spanish and Latin American, French, Italian, German, and Chinese
- Oleksa Synychenko for translations from Georgian and German
- Dmytro Cherednychenko for translations of Lithuanian poetry into Ukrainian
- Olha Seniuk, translations from Swedish, Norwegian, Danish, Icelandic, and English

1995: Leontiy Kir (Kyryakov) for the translation into Greek and Romanian

1996:

- Dmytro Andruhiv for translations from Slavic languages
- Oleksandr Zavhorodniy for the translations into Ukrainian from Swedish and other
- Mykhailo Moskalenko for research in the field of translation and editing the anthology of poetic translation

1997: Mykhailo Lytvynets for translations from Spanish, French, Provençal, Basque, Italian, Polish and other languages

1998:

- Volodymyr Zhitnyk for translations from Czech
- Volodymyr Mitrofanov for the translations of classics of American literature
- Petro Tymochko for translations from the Polish and German

1999: Oleksandr Mokrovolskyi for translations of European literature classics

2000: Viktor Koptilov for the translation of Tristan and Iseult

2001: Evgenia Horeva for the translation from German "Radetsky's March" by Joseph Roth and the works of German and English children's writers

2002: Hryhoriy Filipchuk for the translation from French and Spanish works of Honore de Balzac, André Malraux, Robert Merle, Fernand Braudel, Augusto Ro Bastos, Jorge Isaacs and others

2003:

- Valentyn Tsipko for translations of the works of modern Azerbaijani writers
- Maria Hablevych for translations from the English works by William Shakespeare, John Updike, Jack Kerouac and others
- Stanislav Shevchenko for translations of Polish poetry

2004:

- Svitlana Zholob for poetic and prose translations from Spanish, Georgian, Lithuanian, German, Slavic and other languages
- Viktor Kochevskyi for translation of the Armenian folk epic Davyd Sasunskyi
- Boryslav Stepanyuk for translations of Kyrgyz poetry

2005:

- Ivan Dzyub for translations from Japanese
- Oleh Mykytenko for translations from Czech and Slovak
- Oleksandr Terech for translations from English

2006:

- Oleksiy Logvynenko for translations of novels and short stories by German and English speaking writers
- Roman Lubkivskyi for poetry translations from Slavic languages

2007:

- Galina Kirpa for the translations of the works of Scandinavian writers
- Mykola Miroshnychenko for the translation of the two volume Anthology of Azerbaijani Poetry

2008:

- Serhiy Borshchevskiy for highly artistic translations of the works of poets of Spain and Latin America
- Oleg Zhupansky for the translation from the French novel by Albert Camus "The First Man".

2009: Viktor Shovkun for translations from English, French, Spanish, Italian, Portuguese

2010: Natalya Trokhym for the translation of Midnight's Children by Salman Rushdie

2011: Yurii Popsuenko for the translation of the novel Bikini by Janusz Leon Wiśniewski and other

2012: Petro Tarashchuk for the translation of Antoine de Saint-Exupéry's books

2013:

- Anatoliy Cherdakli for the translation Travels with Herodotus by Ryszard Kapuściński
- Dmytro Сhystiak for the translation of Marguerite Yourcenar's book

2014: Gamada Roman for translations from Persian.

2015: Maksym Strikha for the translation of Divine Comedy by Dante Alighieri

2016: Ivan Riabchyi for Two Gentlemen of Brussels by Éric-Emmanuel Schmitt

2017: Vasyl Stepanenko for the translation from Greek of Erotokritos poem by of Vitsentzos Kornaros

2018: Nina Balykova for the literary translation from the ancient Japanese language of the collection of stories and legends of Yoshida Kenkō

2019: Yuliya Dzhugastryanska for the literary translation of Kim by Rudyard Kipling's

2020:

- Taras Luchuk for the translation collection of works "The First Poets. Code of Ancient Greek Women's Poetry" from the Ancient Greek language
- Valery Kior for the translation into Greek (Urumian) of Kobzar by of Taras Shevchenko

2021:

- Elena O'Lear for the translation into Ukrainian of The Secret Rose by William Butler Yeats
- Dmytro Сhystiak, Nicole Laurent-Katris for the translation from Ukrainian into French of Silver Blood by Pavel Movchan

2022:

- Ivan Megela for the translation of fairy tales by Hermann Hesse
- Raissa Gharagyozyan for the translation into Armenian of Kaidash's Family by Ivan Nechuy-Levytsky

2023:

- Dmytro Drozdovskyi and Andrew Sheppard in the category For the translation of works by Ukrainian classics and contemporary authors into the languages of the peoples of the world; they were recognized for the translation of the children’s anthology Irpin - My Home. This led to controversy throughout the Ukrainian literary community.

2024:

- There was no prize awarded in 2024 due to the 2023 controversy.
