= Dmytro Drozdovskyi =

Ukrainian writer and translator

Dmytro Drozdovskyi Дмитро Дроздовський
- Born: February 18, 1987 (age 39); Odesa, Odesa Oblast, Ukraine
- Occupations: critic, scientist, comparatist, essayist, poet, novelist
- Writing career
- Genre: Ukrainian literature
- Notable work: Meridian of Understanding (2011).

Dmytro Ihorovych Drozdovskyi (Ukrainian: Дмитро́ І́горович Дроздо́вський, born 18 February 1987, Odesa, Ukrainian SSR) is a Ukrainian scientist, literary critic, writer, editor, and translator. Since 2012, he has been working as managing editor-in-chief of the Ukrainian magazine of translations "Vsesvit". He is a PhD academic fellow of the Department of world literature of the Shevchenko Institute of Literature of the National Academy of Sciences of Ukraine. Drozdovskyi is a member of the Supreme Council of the Writer's Union of Ukraine. In 2013, he has competed his PhD dissertation "Reception of William Shakespeare in Ukrainian emigration literature process of 1940-1960-s". Drozdovskyi is a scholar whose academic goals are in the field of contemporary English and British literature, European studies, Shakespearean studies and cultural explanations of post-postmodernism which combines modern and postmodern aesthetics.

He was a participant of the XIX and XX-th Congresses of the International Association of Comparative Literature (Seoul 2010; Paris 2013) and the International Shakespearean Congress. Drozdovskyi also investigated the historical method of Mykhailo Hrushevskyi.

Drozdovskyi is a pro-European and pro-US thinker and critic in Ukraine. He was one of the first to struggle against Kivalov-Kolesnichenko anti-Ukrainian language law and he was in opposition to ex-Minister of Education and Science of Ukraine D. Tabachnyk regime.

Some of Drozdovskyi's poems were translated into French and published in anthologies.

Together with Rory Finnin he initiated the annual Cambridge Vsesvit Readings at the University of Cambridge.

== Education ==
Drozdovskyi belongs to alumni of the National University of Kyiv-Mohyla Academy. He finished his Master program of Arts and Humanities in 2010 (specialty Theory, history of literature and comparative studies). He has been working for 5 years as a press-secretary of the NaUKMA.

== Plagiarism ==
In September 2018, Tetiana Riazantseva accused Dmytro Drozdovskyi of plagiarism in his book 'Multiplicity of Reality in the English Postmodernist Novel,' intended for defense as a doctoral dissertation at the Institute of Literature, National Academy of Sciences of Ukraine. A group of literary scholars, including Riazantseva, Pavlo Mykhed, Oles Fedoruk, Mykhailo Nazarenko and Dmytro Yesypenko published their findings on September 26, revealing extensive plagiarism in ten sections of Drozdovskyi's thesis and partial plagiarism in four more, along with the introduction and conclusions. Drozdovskyi have translated and copied fragments of scholarly papers from Russian, English, and Spanish languages by various authors without proper attribution.

Following these allegations, Institute of Literature Commission was established on October 9, concluding on November 13 that Drozdovsky's monograph contained 64% plagiarism. Consequently, on November 15, the Academic Council of the Institute revoked the recommendation for the monograph's publication.

Scholars from the anti-plagiarism initiative 'Dysergate' supported the commission's findings and cautioned against relying solely on computer programs for detecting plagiarism. Drozdovskyi received 'Plagiarist of the Year' anti-award in 2018 and faced public scrutiny and criticism.

Svitlana Blahodietelieva-Vovk, a coordinator of the 'Dysergate' initiative, characterized Drozdovsky's claims as manipulative attacks. Serhiy Trymbach, a film critic and member of the Committee for the National Taras Shevchenko Award, praised those fighting plagiarism and criticized Drozdovsky's audacious behavior.

Subsequent revelations brought to light further unethical actions by Drozdovskyi, including non-cited borrowings in his book 'Code of the Future' (2006), plagiarized articles in academic journals, and allegations of deceit from illustrator Khrystyna Lukashchuk.

The controversy persisted with director Bohdan Tykholoz's claim in February 2022, asserting that 53% of Drozdovsky's article consisted of borrowed text from his work on Ukrainian writers of the 1960s. Tykholoz called for public condemnation, exclusion from academic committees, and scrutiny of Drozdovsky's other works' authenticity, intending to pursue legal action for copyright protection.

As of January 2024, the latest controversy involving Drozdovsky was the news of him and Andrew Sheppard being awarded the Cabinet of Ministers of Ukraine Maxym Rylskyi Prize. One of the committee members Maxym Strikha protested by resigning and highlighting the award's questionable basis. The controversy prompted concerns about the award's credibility and the potential use of machine translation or AI for the awarded translation. Poet and curator Bohdan-Oleh Horobchuk covered the scandal in detail, criticizing top officials and advocating for reevaluation of the committee's composition and award decisions.

== Works ==
- Code of the Future (Kyiv, 2006, supervisor of the book is Prof. Oxana Pachlovska)
- Meridian of Understanding (Kyiv, 2011)
- Between Demonic and Historiosophic: William Shakespeare in Modern and Post-Postmodern Outlines (Kyiv, 2014)

=== Articles ===
- Postmodern Literature: Ruined Aesthetics or New Frontiers? // Journal of Literature and Art Studies. — Vol. 1. Number 2. — August 2011. — Р. 132–143.
- The Life after the End: Dialogues with the Classics // The International Journal of the Humanities. — Vol.8, Number 12. — 2011. — P. 111–120.
