= Yuriy Klen =

Ukrainian writer (1891–1947)

- Юрій Клен
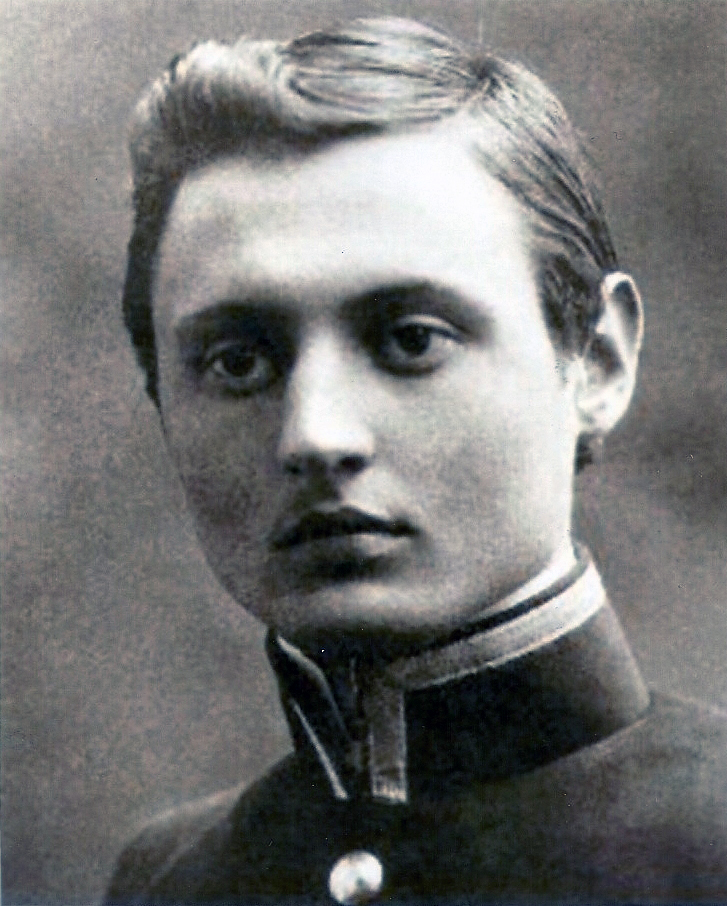
- Born: Oswald Burghardt; 22 October 1891; Serbyvnivtsi, Russian Empire
- Died: 30 October 1947 (aged 56); Augsburg, Germany
- Resting place: Westfriedhof, Munich
- Education: Kyiv University
- Writing career
- Language: Ukrainian
- Period: 1915–1947
- Genre: Modernism
- Literary movement: Kyivan Neoclassicists

Oswald Burghardt (Ukrainian: Освальд Бурґгардт, romanized: Osvald Burghardt), better known by the pen name of Yuriy Klen (Ukrainian: Юрій Клен; 22 October 1891 – 30 October 1947) was a Ukrainian poet, translator and literary critic affiliated with the Kyivan Neoclassicists, a group of modernist writers active in the 1920s.

== Biography ==
Born in 1891 in the region of Podolia in a family of German colonists, Burghardt studied philology at Kyiv University. Due to his German citizenship, he was exiled to Arkhangelsk Governorate during World War I. He started publishing in 1915 as a literary critic. After returning to Kyiv, Klen joined the Neoclassicists, a local group of modernist writers, and engaged in translations of prose and verse from German, French and English languages. After graduating in 1920, Klen taught German and French languages in Kyiv. In 1925 he published an anthology of German poetry in his own translation, called Iron Sonnets (Ukrainian: Залізні сонети). In the same year Klen published a treatise on the works of Percy Shelley, which was followed by studies on Lesya Ukrainka and Heinrich Heine. In 1927-1932 Klen published translations of works by Jack London into Ukrainian. His first authentic works saw the light in 1928.

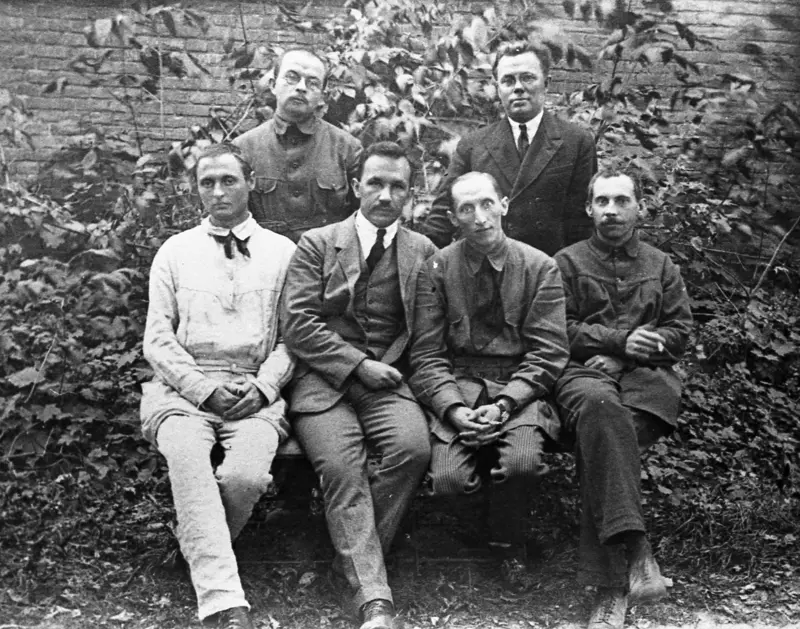
Klen with fellow neoclassicists Viktor Domontovych, Mykola Zerov, Pavlo Fylypovych, Felix Yakubovsky and Maksym Rylsky in Baryshivka, 1920s

In 1931 Klen emigrated to Germany, where he taught the Ukrainian and Russian languages at the University of Münster and a number of other universities. During that time he was also active as a poet and literary critic and co-operated with Dmytro Dontsov's Vistnyk. He also translated works by Shakespeare, Goethe, Rilke, Rimbaud, Paul Valéry and other authors. After the Second World War Klen also became known as a novelist. His poems had a big influence on authors from Western Ukraine and the Ukrainian diaspora, especially those belonging to nationalist circles. After the war Klen lived in Austria, where he edited the Litavry literary magazine. He died in 1947 in Augsburg.

== Literary style ==
Klen's poems are characterized with a broad range of topics and masterful use of neoclassical poetical technique. His works express the idea of work for the sake of fulfillment of national duties that were put on Ukraine by its history and its future.

== Legacy ==
A German-language anthology of works by Kyivan neoclassicists, which was finished by Klen in 1947, but for many years remained unpublished, was issued under the editorship of Ukrainian historian Andrii Portnov and literary critic Natalia Kotenko-Vusatiuk under the title Poetry of the Damned (German: Dichtung der Verdammten).

Klen's gravestone in Augsburg's Westfriedhof cemetery, designed by Ukrainian sculptor Jacques Hnizdovsky, was destroyed in summer 2024, but restored in its authentic form one year later.

== Notable works ==
- New Horizons in the Branch of Studies of Poetic Style (literary study, 1915)
- Lesia Ukrainka and Heine (literary study, 1927)
- Heine in Ukrainian Translations (literary study, 1930)
- Joan of Arc (Ukrainian: Жанна д'Арк, poem, 1936)
- Cursed Years (Ukrainian: Прокляті роки, poem, 1937)
- Caravellas (Ukrainian: Каравели, poetry collection, 1943)
- Ash of Empires (Ukrainian: Попіл імперій, poem, first volume in 1946, second published posthumously in 1957)
- Acacia (Ukrainian: Акація, novella)
- Apples (Ukrainian: Яблука, novella)
- Archangel Raphael (Ukrainian: Архангел Рафаїл, novella)
- Reminiscences about Neoclassicists (Ukrainian: Спогади про неокласиків, book of essays, 1946)
- Diabolic Parables (Ukrainian: Дияболічні параболи, in co-operation with L. Mosendz, 1947)
