= Doctor Seraphicus (book) =

1947 novel by Viktor Petrov

- Author: Viktor Petrov (pseudonym: V. Domontovych)
- Original title: Доктор Серафікус
- Language: Ukrainian
- Genre: Novel
- Publisher: Ukrainian Tribune (first edition)
- Publication date: 1947
- Media type: Print
- Pages: 175 (first edition)

Doctor Seraphicus (Ukrainian: «Доктор Серафікус») is a novel by the Ukrainian writer, philosopher and historian Viktor Petrov, who published it under the literary pseudonym V. Domontovych. The book was written around 1929 and first appeared in print in 1947 in Munich, Germany, in the émigré publishing house «Ukrainska Trybuna» (Ukrainian Tribune). In literary criticism it is often treated as the author’s last completed work of fiction, after which he largely withdrew from literature and concentrated on academic research.

== Plot ==
The plot centres on the relationships of an awkward, reclusive intellectual, Vasyl Khrysanfovych Komakha, nicknamed Doctor Seraphicus, with the small circle of people who make up his only social environment: the five‑year‑old girl Ircia, his long‑standing friend, the artist Volodymyr Korvyn, and the actress Ver Elsner. At a certain point in his life the asocial Seraphicus finds that the only person he speaks to during the day is the little girl Ircia, and his unacknowledged loneliness manifests itself in his desire to have a child, while he refuses even to consider any closer relationship with women.

Korvyn introduces Seraphicus to Ver, a gifted, eccentric and attractive actress who becomes fascinated by his unorthodox personality. Something like a relationship between them develops only slowly and largely through her persistent efforts, while Korvyn himself attempts to win Ver’s affection. Eventually Komakha experiences a feeling close to love for Ver, to the extent that his character and absorption in scholarship allow, but Ver becomes tired of the stalled situation and breaks off their connection.

Alongside the main storyline the novel includes a number of retrospective episodes that clarify the protagonists’ backgrounds, emotions and motives. These flashbacks include the long‑standing friendship between Korvyn and Komakha, the story of Korvyn’s former fiancée Tania Berens, and Seraphicus’s “imagined” romance with his neighbour Taiisiia Pavlivna.

== Characters and themes ==
=== Vasyl Komakha / Doctor Seraphicus ===
Like many of Domontovych’s protagonists, Vasyl Khrysanfovych Komakha is a marginal figure, clearly separated from the social mainstream and portrayed as an “ambivalent” type torn between intellect and life. He is an asocial intellectual and professor whose lifestyle and outlook reject the “natural” in favour of the “cultural”, concrete reality in favour of abstraction, and spontaneity in favour of artificial constructs; his life is subordinated to scholarly work and arranged with almost mechanical precision in an attempt to rationalise every aspect of existence for the sake of academic productivity. Ironically, his research is depicted as having rather modest scholarly value: by delving ever deeper into details, Seraphicus proves incapable of broader generalisations and at times of genuinely creative thinking.

His immersion in scholarship effectively removes Komakha from the real world: critics note that he justifies his isolation by “work”, using it as a slogan that legitimises his seclusion from everyday life. Ordinary social situations that others handle effortlessly become events of catastrophic magnitude for him, because even routine small talk forces him into intense and prolonged reflection. His reclusiveness also shapes his attitude toward love: Seraphicus rejects it as a phenomenon that does not fit into a rationally ordered existence and treats conventional narratives of romantic love as suspect or ironic.

He considers intimate relations unnecessary and irrational, which leads him to contemplate the possibility of fatherhood without the participation of a woman, an idea he attempts to rationalise by appeal to cultural and mythological narratives about miraculous conception. Physically, Komakha is described as a massive, heavy figure whose shaved, reddish face and clumsy movements emphasise his estrangement from the ordinary human world, a body that critics read as almost “unreal” or artificial.

=== Sexuality and androgyny ===
Within the plot Seraphicus is not entirely removed from the sphere of love, and one of the central configurations is a triangle involving Seraphicus, Korvyn and Ver that echoes an earlier triangle with Korvyn and his fiancée Tania Berens. A number of commentators have pointed to the special bond between Seraphicus and Korvyn and raised the question of the protagonist’s sexual orientation, noting that his possible homosexuality fits the “unnatural” and counter‑biological dimension of his character and further destabilises conventional gender roles in the text. In this reading the novel engages with queer themes unusual for Ukrainian literature of its period.

Critics have also drawn attention to the motif of androgyny in the novel and compared it with Honoré de Balzac’s Séraphîta, in which an angelic or semi‑divine figure unites masculine and feminine principles. While in Balzac androgyny is associated with human perfection and transcendence, in Doctor Seraphicus androgyny and asexuality become a source of irony and mark the protagonist’s problematic status in the human world.

=== Intertextuality and archetypal figures ===
Domontovych’s prose is repeatedly described as highly intertextual and self‑reflexive, with a strong tendency to embed subtexts and allusions into the narrative fabric. Literary scholars note an autobiographical parallel in the protagonist’s academic field: like Petrov himself, Komakha works in ethnography and folklore studies, and the figure of the odd, maladjusted “armchair scholar” has been read as one of the author’s self‑projections. Domontovych also lends Seraphicus concrete details from his own scholarly biography, including a focus on the Black Sea region and work with minor historical monuments.

The novel engages with several recurring figures from world literature. One such archetype is Don Juan, explicitly invoked in the text, but inverted: critics have described Komakha as a “Don Juan in reverse”, a man who would “possess everyone and renounce anyone”, showing no interest in conventional relations with women. Another archetype is that of Faust: Seraphicus belongs to the type of the bookish scholar who, in his desire to expand knowledge, separates himself from ordinary life and the wider world, a pattern that critics read as a modernist re‑working of the Faustian figure.

Scholars have also pointed to typological parallels between Doctor Seraphicus and the prose of Vladimir Nabokov, particularly in the motif of the intellectual’s relationship with a young girl and in Domontovych’s earlier work The Girl with the Bear; these have been read as prefiguring certain elements later made famous by Lolita (1955). In the context of Ukrainian modernism, Seraphicus’s musings about conception and childbearing without women have been interpreted as a satirical response to the anxieties of male protagonists in Volodymyr Vynnychenko’s prose, who struggle with the problem of paternity and sexual ethics.

== Psychoanalytic motifs ==
The prose of Victor Petrov‑Domontovych has been widely analysed through Freudian and psychoanalytic lenses. In Doctor Seraphicus the narrator explicitly reflects on dreams as a sphere in which repressed desires awaken at night, become real within dreams and reveal to a person dimensions of existence that might otherwise remain unknown. According to Vira Aheieva, the professor, constrained by rationalism and unaccustomed to analysing the full spectrum of his own emotions and bodily practices, would never have become aware of his repressed paternal instinct had he not dreamt of bathing a child; the dream transforms an unconscious desire into an already‑experienced event and forces him into uncomfortable self‑knowledge.

Another character linked to the theme of dreams is Ver Elsner, who is able to “tune herself” to particular dreams and plans to write a book about the dreams of lovers, which she believes are repetitive and built on recurring motifs.

== Publication history ==
- V. Domontovych. Doctor Seraphicus. Edited and with an introduction by Yurii Korybut; cover design by Yakiv Hnizdovskyi. Munich: «Ukrainska Trybuna», 1947. 175 pp.
- V. Domontovych. Prose in Three Volumes. New York: «Suchasnist», 1988–1989 (series "Biblioteka Prolohu i Suchasnosti"), ISBN 978-3-89278-011-3 (vols. I–III).
  - Vol. I: Apostles (short stories); The Girl with the Bear, Alina and Kostomarov, Doctor Seraphicus (novellas). Edited and with an accompanying essay by Yurii Shevelov; notes by Yurii Shevelov; dust jacket by Yaroslava Heruliak. New York: «Suchasnist», 1988. 519 pp. ISBN 978-3-89278-008-3
- V. Domontovych. Doctor Seraphicus. In: Berezil, 1996, nos. 5–6, pp. 32–115.
- V. Domontovych. Doctor Seraphicus; Without Ground. Introduction by Solomiia Pavlychko. Kyiv: «Krytyka», 1999. (series "Biblioteka XXI stolittia"). ISBN 978-966-7679-06-4
- V. Domontovych. Selected Works. Compiled and introduced by Vira Aheieva. Kyiv: «Knyha», 2008. (series "Works of the Ukrainian Diaspora"). ISBN 978-966-8314-44-5
- V. Domontovych. Doctor Seraphicus. Together with Osyp Turianskyi, Beyond Pain. Afterword and notes by A. V. Zemlianska; illustrations by A. V. Kisel. Kharkiv: «Folio», 2013. (series "School Library of Ukrainian and World Literature"). ISBN 978-966-03-6116-4
- V. Domontovych. The Girl with a Teddy Bear. Doctor Seraficus. Kyiv: Komora Publishing House, 2019. 288 pp. ISBN 978-617-7286-42-3
- Review: “«Доктор Серафікус»: відтепер — роман із продовженням” (Doctor Seraphicus: now a novel with a continuation), Ukrainian Journal, 2024, no. 7, pp. 66–71.
