= Cherkasy National University =

Public university in Cherkasy, Ukraine

Coordinates: 49.4551°N 32.0445°E

Bohdan Khmelnytsky National University of Cherkasy
- ДЗВО "Черкаський національний університет імені Богдана Хмельницького"
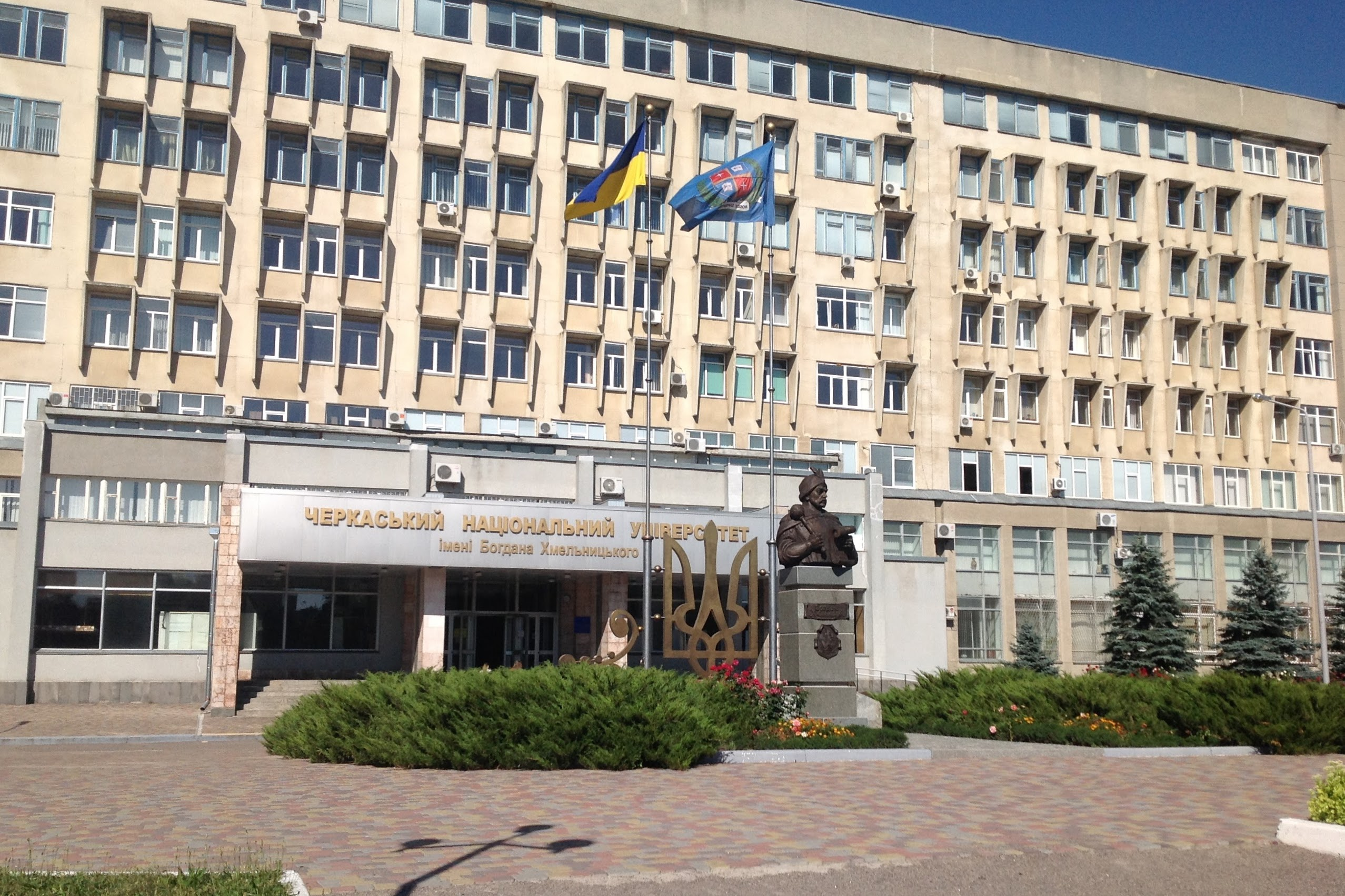
- Motto in English: Cherishing the traditions, Shaping the present, Advancing into the future
- Type: Public
- Established: 1921
- Affiliations: Ministry of Education and Science of Ukraine
- Rector: Olexandr Cherevko
- Administrative staff: 1,100
- Students: 6,000
- Location: Cherkasy, Ukraine
- Campus: urban
- Website: www.cdu.edu.ua/
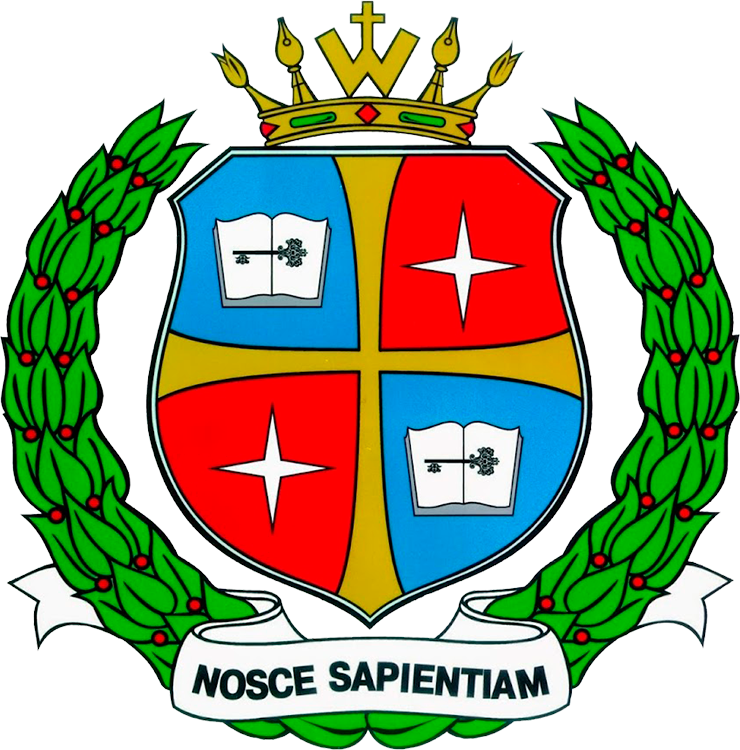

University rankings

Regional – Overall
- QS Emerging Europe and Central Asia: 241-250 (2022)

The Cherkasy National University (named after Bohdan Khmelnytsky, fully titled Bohdan Khmelnytsky National University of Cherkasy) is a state-sponsored university located in Cherkasy (Central Ukraine). It is one of the leading universities of Ukraine. More than 105 years old, it has more than 6,000 students that acquire 54 specialties (Philology, Pedagogical and Social Sciences, Arts, Economics, IT-technologies, Physics, Mathematics, and Natural Sciences). Currently, its structure consists of 8 institutes and two faculties (academic departments). The university was named after Ukrainian Hetman Bohdan Khmelnytsky who was born in Cherkasy region.

== History ==
It was founded in 1921 as the Cherkasy Institute of People's Education. In 1933, the name was changed to Cherkasy State Teacher-Training Institute. Its structure include History, Language and Literature, Physics and Mathematics and Natural Sciences departments. In 1995, the Institute was reorganized into the Bohdan Khmelnitsky State University of Cherkasy, before being granted a national university status in 2003 (Decree of the President of Ukraine dated 21.08.2003, No. 871/2003).

== Organisation and administration ==
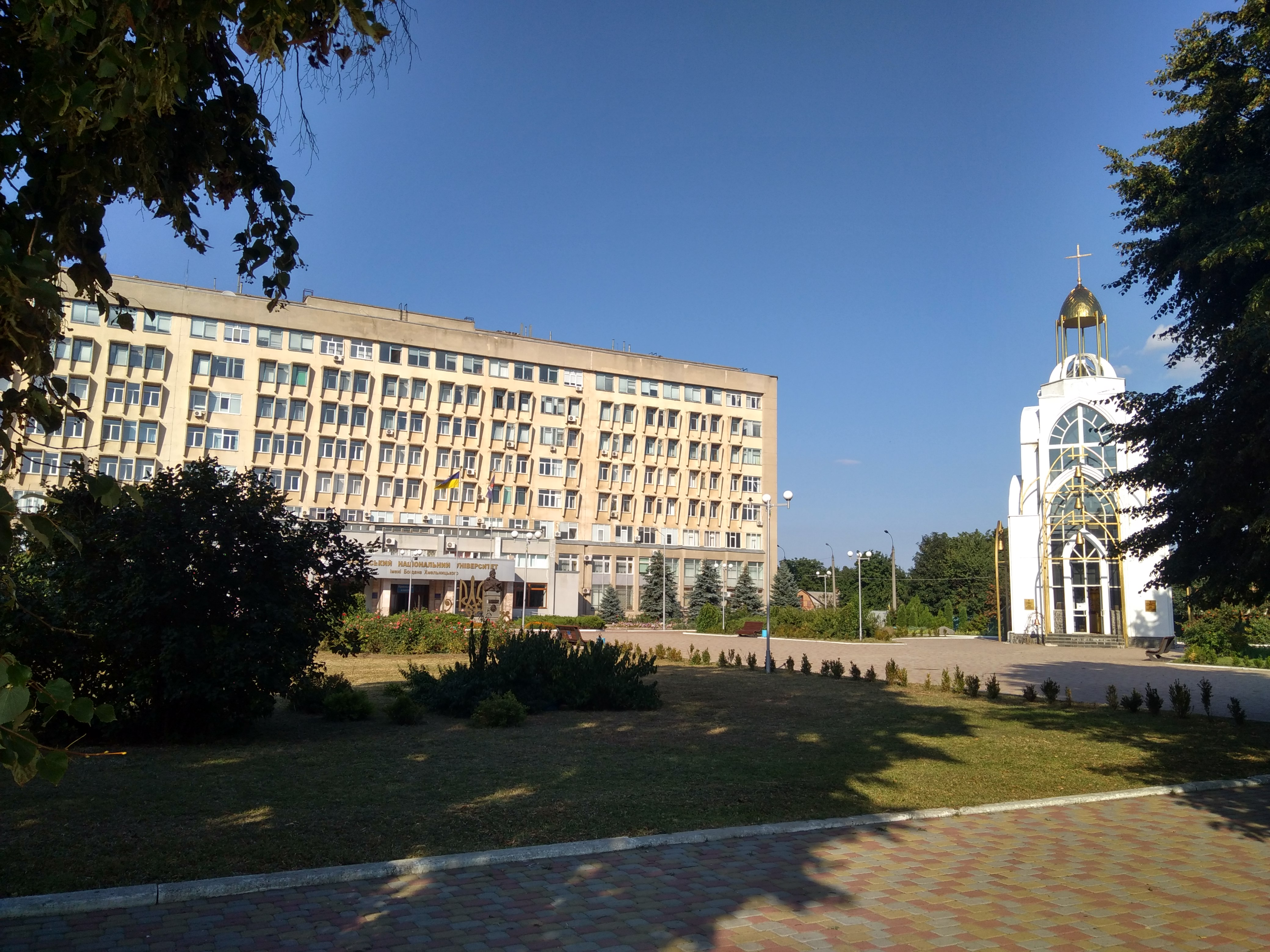
Cherkasy National University

These are the 8 education and research institutes and 2 faculties into which the university is divided:

- Institutes: Economics and Law; Foreign Languages; History and Philosophy; Pedagogical Education; Social Work and Art; Ukrainian Philology and Social Communications; Physics, Mathematics, and Computing and Information Systems; Natural and Agrarian Sciences; Physical Education, Sports, and Health.
- Faculties: Computer Science, Intelligent and Control Systems; Psychology.

Other institutes: Institute of International Education, Institute of Pre-University Training and Post-Graduate Education, Maksymovych Scientific Library, 7 research laboratories, Botanic garden.

Two campuses featuring: 5 academic buildings, the Maksymovych Scientific Library, 7 museums, 5 residence halls housing about 2,000 students on campus, 5 cafes and a dining Hall, 11 playgrounds and gyms, a stadium, a student leisure centre with a network of amateur talent groups and the university church.

== Staff ==
At present the total teaching staff at Cherkasy National University is about 500. Among them there are 65 professors and 322 Associate Professors.

== Courses and programs ==
A number of institutes and faculties offer 4-year Bachelor's and 1.5-year master's degree programs. The University offer 31 Bachelor's and 27 Master's degree programs, post-graduate education. The university is licensed to educate foreign students. There are 4 academic councils for the defense of PhD and Doctor of Science theses in 8 specialties.

== Science ==
There are many scientific laboratories and centres at the university. The main of them are:

- Scientific-and-Research Institute of Physics and Chemistry of Functional Materials,
- Mykhailo Bosyi Scientific-and-Research Institute of Physiology,
- Scientific-and-Research Institute of Peasantry.

There are 15 scientific schools, 5 of which are internationally recognized:

- Solid State Physics and Nanotechnologies – led by prof. Andrii Gusak;
- Quantum Chemistry and Molecular Electronics – led by prof. Boris Minaev;
- Onomasiology — led by prof. Olena Selivanova;
- Cognitive Linguistics — led by prof. Svetlana Zhabotynska;
- Physiology of Neurodynamic Functions of the Brain – led by prof. Volodymyr Lyzogub.

Prof. Andrii Gusak and prof. Boris Minaev are among the best 100 scientists of Ukraine according to Scopus.

Cherkasy National University publishes the scientific periodical journal Cherkasy University Bulletin. The journal is issued in the following series: Applied Mathematics and Informatics, Biological Sciences, Chemical Sciences, Economic Sciences, Historical Sciences, Pedagogical Sciences, Physical and Mathematical Sciences: Physics, Philological Sciences, Philosophy.

== Ranking ==
According to Scopus (2018), Cherkasy National University rates 15 among 128 universities of Ukraine. It has the highest research paper output than any other university in Cherkasy region.

According to Webometrics (2017), the university rates 21 among universities of Ukraine.

== International cooperation ==
More than 100 foreign higher educational establishments and scientific institutions confirmed long-term agreements on international cooperation.

Cherkasy National University joined the Eurasian Association of Universities and the Black Sea Universities Network.

== Notable alumni ==
- Andrey Khimich (born 1937) – Olympic sprint canoer
- Oleksandr Mokrovolskyi (1946–2023) – journalist and translator
- Aleksandr Motuzenko (born 1967) – Olympic sprint canoer
- Anton Skachkov (born 1979) – Paralympic athlete
- Grygorii Vovchynskyi (born 1988) – Paralympic athlete

== See also ==
List of universities in Ukraine
