= Viktor Petrov =

Ukrainian writer (1894–1969)

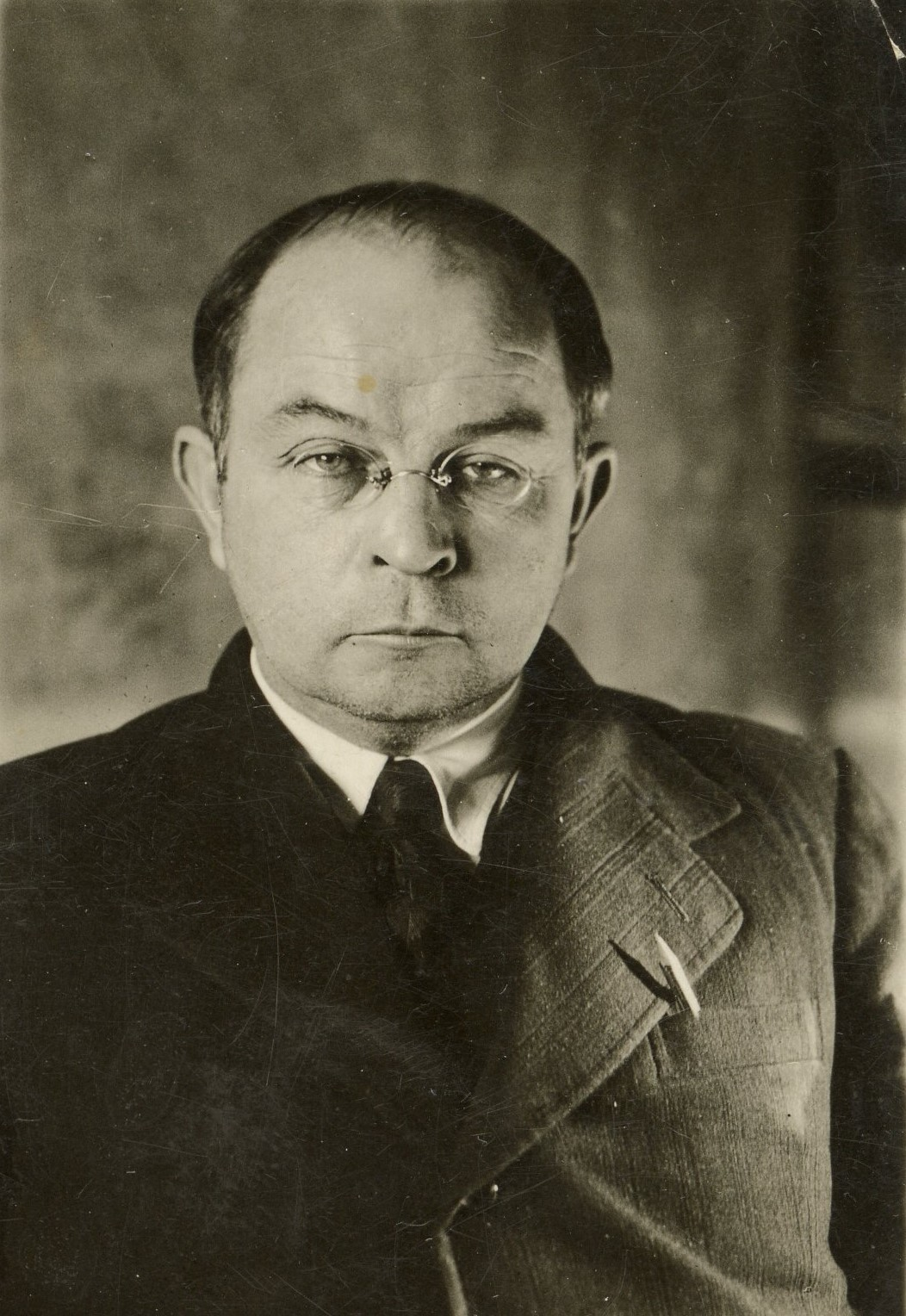
- Born: 10 October 1894; Yekaterinoslav, Ukraine, Russian Empire
- Died: 8 June 1969 (aged 74); Kyiv, Ukrainian SSR
- Occupations: novelist, literary critic, philosopher, archeologist
- Writing career
- Pen name: V. Domontovych, Viktor Ber
- Genre: Ukrainian literature
- Notable work: Doctor Seraficus

Viktor Platonovych Petrov (Ukrainian: Віктор Платонович Петров, pen names V. Domontovych (Ukrainian: В. Домонтович), Viktor Ber (Ukrainian: Віктор Бер); 10 October 1894 – 8 June 1969) was a prominent Ukrainian existentialist writer. Together with Valerian Pidmohylny, Petrov is considered to be the founder of the Ukrainian intellectual novel. Although Petrov is remembered as a writer today, during his life he was a scientist in the first place. He wrote papers on archaeology, anthropology, history, philosophy and literature. Despite having been implicated in co-operation with Soviet secret police later in his life, Petrov is simultaneously known as author of some of the most acute critical texts revealing the nature of the Soviet regime.

== Biography ==
=== Early life ===
Viktor Petrov was born on 10 October 1894 in Yekaterinoslav (today's Dnipro) into the family of Platon Petrov, an Eastern Orthodox theologian, who served as bishop of Uman and vicar of Kyiv, although in Soviet times the writer would claim that his father had been a simple teacher. In 1913 Petrov entered the Faculty of History and Philology at Saint Volodymyr University. After his graduation in 1918 he changed multiple jobs, working as a teacher in order to survive the hardships of civil war which engulfed the city. During the postwar famine in Ukraine he worked in a number of village schools, receiving "natural payment" in form of food, which was scarce in cities at the time.

During his stay in Baryshivka not far from Kyiv, Petrov became close to fellow authors working there, including Mykola Zerov and Yuriy Klen. Later he worked at the ethnographic committee of the Ukrainian Academy of Sciences and engaged in archaeological studies. Petrov's first novel was published in 1928, and by the end of the decade he had become prominent as an author (writing under the pseudonym Domontovych) and scientist. In 1930, he obtained his doctorate for a study titled "Panteleymon Kulish in the 50s. Life. Ideology. Creativity".

=== Arrest and emigration ===
In 1937, during the Soviet campaign of mass government repression against Ukrainian authors, Petrov was arrested, but released after two weeks of detention. It is likely, that around that time he was recruited as an agent by the NKVD. After the start of German-Soviet War the author stayed in the occupied territory worked in several Ukrainian magazines and newspapers. According to one version, he was tasked by Soviet authorities with infiltrating Nazi ranks by posing as a Ukrainian nationalist and entering the proposed German-controlled Ukrainian government. However, after the defeat of German armies at the Battle of Moscow the plans to create such a government were abandoned. Petrov also hinted, that during the war he had been tasked with organizing an assassination attempt on Adolf Hitler during the visit of the latter to Vinnytsia. It is also claimed that Petrov helped to save the Karaites, using his authority as ethographer to persuade the Nazis that they did not belong to the Jewish people.

After World War II Petrov stayed in emigration in Germany, working as a professor at the Ukrainian Free University in Munich. He was also one of the founding members of the Ukrainian artist movement, a literary organization of the Ukrainian intellectual diaspora. His articles published in emigration contained strong criticism of the Soviet regime, which he accused of destroying Ukrainian culture.

=== Disappearance and return to the Soviet Union ===
On 18 April 1949 Petrov went missing after leaving his flat in the Schwabing district of Munich. Despite appeals to the occupation authorities by the Shevchenko Scientific Society and the Ukrainian Free University, search attempts were unsuccessful, and it was widely believed that Petrov had been murdered by Soviet agents due to the anti-Communist contents of his articles. However, in 1955 his name was found published in a list of Soviet archaeologists (due to a reference to him in Aleksandr Mongait's survey book), and it became clear that he had returned to the Soviet Union and kept working at the Institute of Archaeology in Kyiv. Due to the closure of Soviet secret archives, the exact nature of Petrov's co-operation with Soviet secret services is still unknown, but according to Ukrainian emigrant writer and scientist George Shevelov, there is no proof that any information on the diaspora's activities had been transferred by him to Communist authorities. Petrov died in 1969 and was buried in Kyiv.

== Writings ==
=== Novels ===
- On Shaky Ground (Без ґрунту) (1942–1943)
- Girl with a Teddy Bear (Ukrainian: Дівчина з ведмедиком) (1928)
- Doctor Seraficus (Ukrainian: Доктор Серафікус) (1928–1929, published in 1947)
- Alina and Kostomarov (Ukrainian: Аліна й Костомаров) (1929)
- Kulish's romances (Ukrainian: Романи Куліша) (1930)
- Doctor Seraficus (English translation of excerpt), translated by Yuri Tkacz, in Before the Storm, Ardis Publishers USA

=== Scientific publications ===
- Origin of the Ukrainian Nation
- Scythians — language and ethnicity
- Ethnogenesis of Slavs
- [ Development of Ukrainian People]
- Ukrainian cultural activists - victims of repressions
