= Maksym Rylsky =

Soviet Ukrainian poet (1895–1964)

- Максим Тадейович Рильський
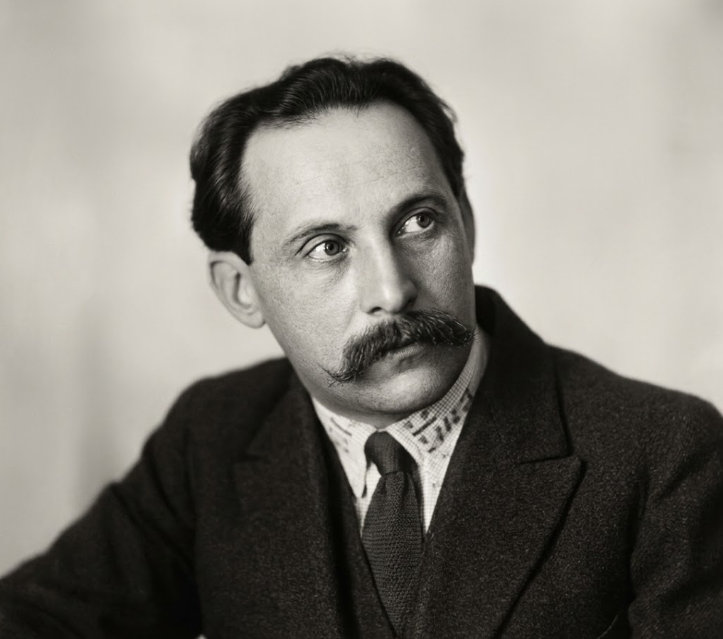
- Rylsky in 1928
- Born: 19 March 1895; Kiev, Russian Empire
- Died: 24 July 1964 (aged 69); Kyiv, Ukrainian SSR, Soviet Union
- Resting place: Baikove Cemetery, Kyiv
- Citizenship: Soviet Union
- Education: Kyiv University
- Occupation: Poet
- Spouse: Kateryna Mykolaivna Rylska
- Children: Bohdan Rylsky
- Writing career
- Years active: 1907–1964
- Genres: Neoclassicism, Social realism
- Notable works: "Troyandy j vynohrad" (Roses and grapes)
- Notable awards: Stalin prize Lenin Prize
- Movement: Kyivan Neoclassicism

Ostoja coat of arms

Maksym Tadeyovych Rylsky (Ukrainian: Максим Тадейович Рильський; 19 March [O.S. 7 March] 1895 – 24 July 1964) was a Soviet Ukrainian poet, translator, academician, and doctor of philological sciences.

== Biography ==
Rylsky was born in Kyiv in 1895 to Tadei Rozeslavovych Rylsky and Melania Fedorivna. His father was a public activist, ethnographer, publicist, and member of the Kyiv Stara Hromada (Old Community), while his mother was a peasant from the village of Romanivka, Zhytomyr Oblast. The Rylsky family was said to be descended from a Polish student of the Uniate academy in Uman, who studied Ruthenian (Ukrainian) and almost became a victim of the Koliivshchyna rebellion. He survived, but as an illegitimate child could only become a Uniate clergyman, not a Roman Catholic one. Eventually he became a landlord and an influential Polish nobleman.

Rylsky received his early education at home and attended school starting from third grade at the Kyiv Private Gymnasium of Volodymyr Naumenko in 1908. During his time in gymnasium, Rylsky became friends with the families of Mykola Lysenko and Oleksandr Rusov. From 1915 to 1917, he studied at the medical faculty of Kyiv University. When the Ukrainian People's University was established in October 1917, Rylsky transferred to its history and philology faculty.

Due to the Ukrainian-Soviet War, Rylsky left Kyiv in late 1917. He and his brother Ivan worked at the food administration in the city of Skvyra and later as rural teachers in nearby villages. In 1918, Bolshevik sympathizers in Romanivka forced Rylsky to flee his family home, robbed it, and destroyed his father's archive and library.

Rylsky did not return to Kyiv until 1923, where he initially worked as a teacher.

== Works ==
Rylsky began writing poetry at a young age. His debut poem was published in 1907 in the newspaper Rada, and his first collection, At White Isles (Ukrainian: На білих островах), was released in 1910. By 1918, his poems "Tsarevna" and "On the Edge of the Forest", as well as his collection Beneath Autumn Stars, demonstrated that his period of apprenticeship and imitating the voices of other poets had passed. His 1922 collection, Blue Distance, confirmed this.

Rylsky studied medicine, history and philosophy in Taras Shevchenko University of Kyiv.

Throughout the 1920s, Rylsky continued to write poetry. During this time, he published several collections of poetry, including Through Storm and Snow (1925), The 13th Spring (1926), Where Roads Meet, and Hum and Rumbling (both 1929). In the latter collection, Rylsky demonstrated his skill as a translator of world poetry, including works by Paul Verlaine, Stéphane Mallarmé, Valery Bryusov, Maurice Maeterlinck, and others. One notable translation was of Adam Mickiewicz's "Pan Tadeusz".

Rylskyi was arrested and imprisoned for several months in 1931.

A representative of the "pure art" doctrine, Rylsky was active during the years when the Stalinists adopted the official doctrine of "socialist realism". In 1937, he was involved in rewriting the libretto of Mykola Lysenko's opera Taras Bulba, and later returned to neo-classical forms. Rylsky is one of the most notable Ukrainian poets of the 20th century He was also a master of the modern sonnet and the long narrative poem. He was closely associated with the Neoclassicist group of Ukrainian poets. The group employed traditional poetic forms with rhyme and meter, wrote in a clear and accessible contemporary idiom, and often referenced Ancient Greek and Roman mythology, as well as the works of other authors from world literature, in their poetry.

During World War II, he and his family were evacuated from Kyiv to Ufa from 1941-44. During this period, he wrote two long poems that deviated from socialist realism: "Thirst" (1942) and "Journey to Youth" (1941–1944), for which he was again publicly chastised. In 1944, he became the director of the Institute of Fine Arts, Folklore, and Ethnography in Kyiv, a post he held until his death in 1964. The Institute now bears his name. He published about 30 collections of original poetry during his lifetime, as well as translations and scholarly works. By 1974, almost five million copies of his works, in the original or in translation, had been published in the USSR.

Rylsky became a member of the Communist Party in 1943 and was elected to the Supreme Soviet of the Soviet Union in 1946.

After Rylskyi's death, his house became an official museum; the street was renamed Maksym Rylskyi Street.

== Language skills and translation ==
Rylsky was a translator with knowledge of 13 languages and the ability to translate from 30 languages. He specialized in translating from French, German and Russian.

== Awards ==
- Order of the Red Banner of Labor to Rylsky in 1939
- Awarded the State Prize of Ukraine in 1943
- Stalin Prize, 1943 - for his collections of poems Slovo pro ridnu matir, Svitova zorya, Svitla zbroya, Mandrivka v molodist
- Stalin Prize, 1950 - translation into Ukrainian of the poem "Pan Tadeusz" by Adam Mickiewicz
- Lenin Prize, 1960 - for his collections of poems Daleki neboskhyly (1959) and Troyandy j vynohrad (1957)
- Elected a full member of the Academy of Sciences
- The Maksym Rylsky Prize for translation was established in 1972

== See also ==
- Rylsky Institute of Art Studies, Folklore and Ethnology
- Maxym Rylsky Museum
- Maksym Rylsky Prize
- List of Ukrainian-language poets
- List of Ukrainian literature translated into English
